= List of members of the National Assembly (South Korea), 1992–1996 =

The members of the fourteenth National Assembly of South Korea were elected on 24 March 1992. The Assembly sat from 30 May 1992 until 29 May 1996.

== Members ==
Province/City	Constituency	Member	Party	
Province/City	Constituency	Member	At election	At term's end
Seoul	Jongno	Lee Jong-chan	DLP	NCNP
Seoul	Jung	Chyung Dai-chul	Democratic	NCNP
Seoul	Yongsan	Suh Chung-hwa	DLP	NKP
Seoul	Seongdong A	Lee Sei-kee	DLP	NKP
Seoul	Seongdong B	Cho Se-hyung	Democratic	NCNP
Seoul	Seongdong C	Kang Soo-lim	Democratic	UDP
Seoul	Dongdaemun A	Ro Seung-woo	DLP	NKP
Seoul	Dongdaemun B	Kim Yung-koo	DLP	NKP
Seoul	Jungnang A	Lee Soon-jae	DLP	NKP
Seoul	Jungnang B	Kim Duk-kyu	Democratic	NCNP
Seoul	Seongbuk A	Lee Chul	Democratic	UDP
Seoul	Seongbuk B	Shin Geh-ryoon	Democratic	NCNP
Seoul	Dobong A	Yoo Ihn-tae	Democratic	UDP
Seoul	Dobong B	Kim Won-gil	Democratic	NCNP
Seoul	Dobong C	Chough Soon-hyung	Democratic	NCNP
Seoul	Nowon A	Paek Nam-chi	DLP	NKP
Seoul	Nowon B	Kim Yong-chae (Note: Kim Yong-chae was removed on 8 September 1992, after his election was invalidated.)	DLP	NKP
Seoul	Nowon B	Lim Chae-jung (Note: Lim Chae-heong was declared elected on 8 September 1992, after Kim Yong-chae's election was invalidated.)	Democratic	NCNP
Seoul	Eunpyeong A	Sonn Se-il	Democratic	NCNP
Seoul	Eunpyeong B	Lee Won-hyoung	Democratic	NCNP
Seoul	Seodaemun A	Kim Song-hyum	Democratic	NCNP
Seoul	Sodaemun B	Lim Choon-won	Democratic	UDP
Seoul	Mapo A	Park Myung-hwan	DLP	NKP
Seoul	Mapo B	Park Joo-cheon	DLP	NKP
Seoul	Yangcheon A	Park Bum-jin	DLP	NKP
Seoul	Yangcheon B	Kim Yung-bae	Democratic	NCNP
Seoul	Gangseo A	Park Gye-dong	Democratic	UDP
Seoul	Gangseo B	Choi Doo-hwan	Democratic	NCNP
Seoul	Guro A	Kim Ki-bae	DLP	NKP
Seoul	Guro B	Lee Kyung-jae	Democratic	NCNP
Seoul	Guro C	Kim Byung-o	Democratic	NCNP
Seoul	Yeongdeungpo A	Chang Suk-hwa	Democratic	NCNP
Seoul	Yeongdeungpo B	Rha Woong-bae	DLP	NKP
Seoul	Dongjak A	Suh Chung-won	DLP	NKP
Seoul	Dongjak B	Park Sil	Democratic	NCNP
Seoul	Gwanak A	Han Gwang-ok	Democratic	NCNP
Seoul	Gwanak B	Lee Hae-chan (Note: Lee Hae-chan resigned on 30 June 1995, upon being appointed as Deputy Mayor of Seoul.)	Democratic	Democratic
Seoul	Seocho A	Park Chan-jong (Note: Park Chan-jong resigned on 9 June 1995, to run in the 1995 Seoul mayoral election.)	NPRP	Independent
Seoul	Seocho B	Kim Deog-ryong	DLP	NKP
Seoul	Gangnam A	Kim Dong-gill	UNP	ULD
Seoul	Gangnam B	Hong Sa-duk	Democratic	Independent
Seoul	Songpa A	Cho Soon-hwan	UNP	ULD
Seoul	Songpa B	Kim Jong-wan	Democratic	UDP
Seoul	Gangdong A	Lee Bu-young (Note: Lee Bu-young was removed on 4 November 1995.)	Democratic	Democratic
Seoul	Gangdong B	Kim Zoong-wie	DLP	NKP
Busan	Jung	Chung Sang-chun	DLP	ULD
Busan	Seo	Kwak Jung-chul	DLP	Independent
Busan	Dong	Hur Sam-soo	DLP	Independent
Busan	Yeongdo	Kim Hyong-o	DLP	NKP
Busan	Busanjin A	Chung Jey-moon	DLP	NKP
Busan	Busanjin B	Kim Jeung-soo	DLP	NKP
Busan	Dongrae A	Park Kwan-yong (Note: Park Kwan-yong resigned on 27 February 1993, upon being appointed as Chief of Staff to the President.)	DLP	DLP
Busan	Dongrae A	Kang Kyong-shik (Note: Kang Kyong-shik was by-elected on 23 April 1993, to succeed Park Kwan-yong.)	DLP	NKP
Busan	Dongrae B	Choi Hyung-woo	DLP	NKP
Busan	Nam A	Hur Jae-hong	DLP	NKP
Busan	Nam B	Yoo Heung-soo	DLP	NKP
Busan	Buk A	Moon Jung-su (Note: Moon Jung-su resigned on 7 June 1995, to run in the 1995 Busan mayoral election.)	DLP	DLP
Busan	Buk B	Shin Sang-woo	DLP	NKP
Busan	Haeundae	Kim Woon-hwan	DLP	NKP
Busan	Saha	Seo Seok-jai (Note: Seo Seok-jai was removed on 29 January 1993.)	Independent	DLP
Busan	Saha	Park Jong-ung (Note: Park Jong-ung was by-elected on 23 April 1993, to succeed Seo Seok-jai.)	DLP	NKP
Busan	Geumjeong	Kim Jin-jae	DLP	NKP
Busan	Gangseo	Song Doo-ho	DLP	NKP
Daegu	Jung	Yoo Su-ho	DLP	ULD
Daegu	Dong A	Kim Bok-dong	DLP	ULD
Daegu	Dong B	Park Jyun-kyu (Note: Park Jyun-kyu resigned on 30 June 1993.)	DLP	DLP
Daegu	Dong B	Suh Hoon (Note: Suh Hoon was by-elected on 12 August 1993, to succeed Park Jyun-kyu.)	Independent	Independent
Daegu	Seo A	Chung Ho-yong	Independent	Independent
Daegu	Seo B	Kang Jae-sup	DLP	NKP
Daegu	Nam	Kim Hae-seok	UNP	NKP
Daegu	Buk	Kim Yong-tae	DLP	NKP
Daegu	Suseong A	Park Chul-un (Note: Park Chul-un was removed on 28 June 1994.)	DLP	UDP
Daegu	Suseong A	Hyun Kyung-ja (Note: Hyun Kyung-ja was by-elected on 2 August 1994, to succeed Park Chul-un.)	NDP	ULD
Daegu	Suseong B	Yun Yeong-tak	UNP	NKP
Daegu	Dalseo A	Kim Han-kyu	DLP	NKP
Daegu	Dalseo B	Choi Jae-wook	DLP	ULD
Incheon	Jung–Dong	Suh Jung-hwa	DLP	NKP
Incheon	Nam A	Shim Chung-ku	DLP	NKP
Incheon	Nam B	Ha Keun-soo	Democratic	NCNP
Incheon	Namdong	Kang Woo-hyuk (Note: Kang Woo-hyuk resigned on 9 June 1995, to run in the 1995 Incheon mayoral election.)	DLP	ULD
Incheon	Buk A	Cho Jin-hyeong	Independent	NKP
Incheon	Buk B	Lee Seung-yun	DLP	NKP
Incheon	Seo	Cho Young-jang	DLP	NKP
Gwangju	Dong	Shin Ki-ha	Democratic	NCNP
Gwangju	Seo A	Chung Sang-yong	Democratic	NCNP
Gwangju	Seo B	Lim Bok-jin	Democratic	NCNP
Gwangju	Buk A	Park Kwang-tae	Democratic	NCNP
Gwangju	Buk B	Lee Kil-jae	Democratic	NCNP
Gwangju	Gwangsan	Cho Hong-kyu	Democratic	NCNP
Daejeon	Dong A	Nam Jae-du	DLP	NKP
Daejeon	Dong B	Song Chun-young	Democratic	NKP
Daejeon	Jung	Kang Chang-hee	Independent	ULD
Daejeon	Seo–Yuseong	Lee Jae-hwan	Independent	NKP
Daejeon	Daedeok	Kim Won-wung	Democratic	UDP
Gyeonggi Province	Gwonseon A, Suwon	Kim In-young	DLP	NKP
Gyeonggi Province	Gwonseon B, Suwon	Nam Pyung-woo	DLP	NKP
Gyeonggi Province	Jangan, Suwon	Lee Ho-jong	UNP	NKP
Gyeonggi Province	Sujeong, Seongnam	Lee Yoon-soo	Democratic	NCNP
Gyeonggi Province	Jungwon–Bundang, Seongnam	Oh Se-eung	DLP	NKP
Gyeonggi Province	Uijeongbu	Moon Hee-sang	Democratic	NCNP
Gyeonggi Province	Anyang A	Rhee In-je (Note: Rhee In-je resigned on 9 June 1995, to run in the 1995 Gyeonggi gubernatorial election.)	DLP	NKP
Gyeonggi Province	Anyang B	Lee Seok-hyun	Democratic	NCNP
Gyeonggi Province	Jung A, Bucheon	An Dong-seon	Democratic	NCNP
Gyeonggi Province	Jung B, Bucheon	Won Hye-young	Democratic	UDP
Gyeonggi Province	Nam, Bucheon	Park Kyu-sik	Democratic	ULD
Gyeonggi Province	Gwangmyeong	Yoon Hang-yol (Note: Yoon Hang-yol died on 25 January 1993.)	UNP	UNP
Gyeonggi Province	Gwangmyeong	Sohn Hak-kyu (Note: Sohn Hak-kyu was by-elected on 23 April 1993, to succeed Yoon Hang-yol.)	DLP	NKP
Gyeonggi Province	Songtan–Pyeongtaek City	Kim Young-kwang	DLP	NKP
Gyeonggi Province	Dongducheon–Yangju	Im Sa-bin (Note: Im Sa-bin resigned on 9 June 1995, to run in the 1995 Gyeonggi gubernatorial election.)	DLP	Independent
Gyeonggi Province	Ansan–Ongjin	Chang Kyung-woo (Note: Chang Kyung-woo resigned on 9 June 1995, to run in the 1995 Gyeonggi gubernatorial election.)	DLP	Democratic
Gyeonggi Province	Gwacheon–Uiwang	Park Jea-sang	UNP	ULD
Gyeonggi Province	Siheung–Gunpo	Jei Jung-ku	Democratic	UDP
Gyeonggi Province	Guri	Chung Joo-il	UNP	NKP
Gyeonggi Province	Migeum–Namyangju	Lee Sung-ho	DLP	NKP
Gyeonggi Province	Yeoju	Rhee Q-taek	Democratic	UDP
Gyeonggi Province	Pyongtaek County	Lee Ja-hon	DLP	NKP
Gyeonggi Province	Osan–Hwaseong	Chung Jang-hyun	DLP	NKP
Gyeonggi Province	Paju	Park Myung-kun	DLP	NKP
Gyeonggi Province	Goyang	Lee Taek-seok	DLP	NKP
Gyeonggi Province	Hanam–Gwangju	Chung Young-hoon	DLP	NKP
Gyeonggi Province	Yeoncheon–Pocheon	Lee Han-dong	DLP	NKP
Gyeonggi Province	Gapyeong–Yangpyeong	Ahn Chan-hee	DLP	NKP
Gyeonggi Province	Icheon	Lee Young-moon	DLP	NKP
Gyeonggi Province	Yongin	Lee Woong-hee	Independent	Independent
Gyeonggi Province	Anseong	Lee Hae-koo	DLP	NKP
Gyeonggi Province	Gimpo–Ganghwa	Kim Doo-sup	UNP	NKP
Gangwon Province	Chuncheon	Son Sung-dack (Note: Son Sung-dack died on 22 May 1993.)	UNP	UNP
Gangwon Province	Chuncheon	Ryu Chong-su (Note: Ryu Chong-su was by-elected on 12 August 1993, to succeed Son Sung-dack.)	DLP	ULD
Gangwon Province	Wonju	Won Kwang-hoo	UNP	Independent
Gangwon Province	Gangneung	Choi Don-woung	Independent	NKP
Gangwon Province	Donghae	Kim Hyo-yung	UNP	NKP
Gangwon Province	Taebaek	Ryu Seung-kyu	DLP	Independent
Gangwon Province	Myeongju–Yangyang	Kim Moon-kee (Note: Kim Moon-kee resigned on 30 March 1993.)	DLP	DLP
Gangwon Province	Myeongju–Yangyang	Choi Wook-cheul (Note: Choi Wook-cheul was by-elected on 11 June 1993, to succeed Kim Moon-kee.)	Democratic	UDP
Gangwon Province	Samcheok City–Samcheok County	Kim Jung-nam	Independent	ULD
Gangwon Province	Hongcheon	Cho Il-hyun	UNP	ULD
Gangwon Province	Chunseong–Yanggu–Inje	Lee Min-sup	DLP	NKP
Gangwon Province	Wonju–Hoengseong	Park Kyung-soo	DLP	NKP
Gangwon Province	Yeongwol–Pyeongchang	Shim Myung-boo (Note: Shim Myung-boo died on 24 May 1994.)	DLP	DLP
Gangwon Province	Yeongwol–Pyeongchang	Kim Ki-soo (Note: Kim Ki-soo was by-elected on 2 August 1994, to succeed Shim Myung-boo.)	DLP	NKP
Gangwon Province	Jeongseon	Park Woo-byong	DLP	NKP
Gangwon Province	Sokcho–Goseong	Chung Jae-chull	DLP	NKP
Gangwon Province	Hwacheon–Cholwon	Kim Jae-soon (Note: Kim Jae-soon resigned on 30 March 1993.)	DLP	DLP
Gangwon Province	Hwacheon–Cholwon	Lee Yong-sam (Note: Lee Yong-sam was by-elected on 11 June 1993, to succeed Kim Jae-soon.)	DLP	NKP
North Chungcheong Province	Cheongju A	Kim Jin-yeong	UNP	ULD
North Chungcheong Province	Cheongju B	Cheong Ki-ho	Democratic	UDP
North Chungcheong Province	Chungju–Chungwon	Lee Jong-keun	DLP	ULD
North Chungcheong Province	Jecheon City	Lee Choon-koo	DLP	NKP
North Chungcheong Province	Cheongwon	Shin Kyung-sik	DLP	NKP
North Chungcheong Province	Boeun–Okcheon–Yeongdong	Park Jun-byung	DLP	ULD
North Chungcheong Province	Gwisan	Kim Chong-hoh	DLP	NKP
North Chungcheong Province	Jincheon–Eumseong	Min Tae-koo	DLP	NKP
North Chungcheong Province	Jecheon County–Danyang	Song Kwang-ho	UNP	NKP
South Chungcheong Province	Cheonan City	Sung Moo-yong	Independent	NKP
South Chungcheong Province	Gongju City–Gongju County	Lee Sang-jae	Independent	NKP
South Chungcheong Province	Daecheon–Boryeong	Kim Yong-hwan	DLP	ULD
South Chungcheong Province	Onyang–Asan	Hwang Myung-soo	DLP	NKP
South Chungcheong Province	Geumsan	Jung Tae-yong	UNP	ULD
South Chungcheong Province	Yeongi	Park Hee-boo	UNP	NKP
South Chungcheong Province	Nonsan	Kim Bum-myung	UNP	ULD
South Chungcheong Province	Buyeo	Kim Jong-pil	DLP	ULD
South Chungcheong Province	Seocheon	Lee Keung-kyu	DLP	ULD
South Chungcheong Province	Cheongyang–Hongseong	Cho Boo-young	DLP	ULD
South Chungcheong Province	Yesan	Oh Jang-seop	DLP	NKP
South Chungcheong Province	Seosan City–Seosan County–Taean	Han Young-soo	Democratic	ULD
South Chungcheong Province	Dangjin	Song Young-jin	UNP	NKP
South Chungcheong Province	Cheonan County	Ham Suk-jae	DLP	ULD
North Jeolla Province	Wansan, Jeonju	Chang Young-dal	Democratic	NCNP
North Jeolla Province	Deokjin, Jeonju	Oh Tan	Democratic	Independent
North Jeolla Province	Gunsan	Chae Young-suk	Democratic	NCNP
North Jeolla Province	Iri	Lee Hyup	Democratic	NCNP
North Jeolla Province	Jeongju–Jeongeup	Kim Won-ki	Democratic	UDP
North Jeolla Province	Namwon City–Namwon County	Yang Chang-sik	DLP	NKP
North Jeolla Province	Wanju	Kim Tai-shik	Democratic	NCNP
North Jeolla Province	Jinan–Muju–Jangsu	Hwang In-sung	DLP	NKP
North Jeolla Province	Imsil–Sunchang	Hong Young-kee	Democratic	UDP
North Jeolla Province	Gochang	Chung Kyun-hwan	Democratic	NCNP
North Jeolla Province	Buan	Lee Hee-chun	Democratic	NCNP
North Jeolla Province	Gimje City–Gimje County	Choi Rak-do	Democratic	Independent
North Jeolla Province	Okgu	Kang Chul-sun	Democratic	NCNP
North Jeolla Province	Iksan	Choi Jae-seung	Democratic	NCNP
South Jeolla Province	Mokpo	Kwon Roh-kap	Democratic	NCNP
South Jeolla Province	Yeosu	Kim Choong-joh	Democratic	NCNP
South Jeolla Province	Suncheon	Huh Kyung-man (Note: Huh Kyung-man resigned on 7 June 1995, to run in the 1995 South Jeolla gubernatorial election.)	Democratic	Democratic
South Jeolla Province	Naju City–Naju County	Kim Jang-kon	Democratic	NCNP
South Jeolla Province	Yeocheon City–Yeocheon County	Shin Soon-beom	Democratic	NCNP
South Jeolla Province	Damyang–Jangseong	Park Tae-young	Democratic	Independent
South Jeolla Province	Gokseong–Gurye	Hwang Ui-sung	Democratic	UDP
South Jeolla Province	Donggwangyang–Gwangyang	Kim Myung-kyu	Democratic	NCNP
South Jeolla Province	Seungju	Cho Soon-sung	Democratic	NCNP
South Jeolla Province	Goheung	Park Sang-cheon	Democratic	NCNP
South Jeolla Province	Boseong	Yoo Joon-sang	Democratic	Independent
South Jeolla Province	Hwasun	Hong Ki-hoon	Democratic	UDP
South Jeolla Province	Jangheung	Lee Young-kwon	Democratic	NCNP
South Jeolla Province	Gangjin–Wando	Kim Young-jin	Democratic	NCNP
South Jeolla Province	Haenam–Jindo	Kim Bong-ho	Democratic	NCNP
South Jeolla Province	Yeongam	Yoo In-hak	Democratic	NCNP
South Jeolla Province	Muan	Park Seok-moo	Democratic	UDP
South Jeolla Province	Hampyeong–Yeonggwang	Kim In-kon	Democratic	NCNP
South Jeolla Province	Sinan	Hahn Hwa-kap	Democratic	NCNP
North Gyeongsang Province	Buk, Pohang	Hur Hwa-pyung	Independent	Independent
North Gyeongsang Province	Gyeongju	Suh Soo-jong (Note: Suh Soo-jong died on 15 May 1994.)	DLP	DLP
North Gyeongsang Province	Gyeongju	Lee Sang-doo (Note: Lee Sang-doo was by-elected on 2 August 1994, to succeed Suh Soo-jong.)	Democratic	ULD
North Gyeongsang Province	Gimcheon–Geumneung	Park Chung-su	DLP	NCNP
North Gyeongsang Province	Andong City	Kim Kil-hong	Independent	NKP
North Gyeongsang Province	Gumi	Park Seh-jik	DLP	NKP
North Gyeongsang Province	Yeongju–Yeongpung	Kum Jin-ho	DLP	NKP
North Gyeongsang Province	Yeongcheon City–Yeongcheon County	Park Heon-ki	Independent	NKP
North Gyeongsang Province	Sangju City–Sangju County	Kim Sang-koo	Independent	Independent
North Gyeongsang Province	Jeomchun–Mungyeong	Lee Sung-moo	Independent	Independent
North Gyeongsang Province	Dalseong–Goryeong	Koo Ja-choon	DLP	ULD
North Gyeongsang Province	Gunwi–Seonsan	Kim Yoon-whan	DLP	NKP
North Gyeongsang Province	Uiseong	Kim Dong-kwon	DLP	Independent
North Gyeongsang Province	Andong County	Ryu Don-woo	DLP	NKP
North Gyeongsang Province	Cheongsong–Yeongdeok	Kim Chan-woo	UNP	NKP
North Gyeongsang Province	Yeongyang–Bonghwa	Kang Shin-joe	DLP	Independent
North Gyeongsang Province	Nam, Pohang–Ulleung	Lee Sang-deuk	DLP	NKP
North Gyeongsang Province	Gyeongju	Hwang Yoon-ki	DLP	NKP
North Gyeongsang Province	Gyeongsan City–Gyeongsan County–Cheongdo	Lee Young-chang	DLP	NKP
North Gyeongsang Province	Seongju–Chilgok	Chang Yung-chul	DLP	NKP
North Gyeongsang Province	Yecheon	Yoo Hak-seong (Note: Yoo Hak-seong resigned on 30 March 1993.)	DLP	DLP
North Gyeongsang Province	Yecheon	Ban Hyung-sik (Note: Ban Hyung-sik was by-elected on 11 June 1993, to succeed Yoo Hak-seong.)	DLP	NKP
North Gyeongsang Province	Uljin	Lee Hak-won	UNP	ULD
South Gyeongsang Province	Changwon A	Kim Jong-ha	DLP	NKP
South Gyeongsang Province	Changwon B	Hwang Nak-joo	DLP	NKP
South Gyeongsang Province	Jung, Ulsan City	Tchah Hwa-june	UNP	NKP
South Gyeongsang Province	Nam, Ulsan City	Cha Soo-myung	UNP	NKP
South Gyeongsang Province	Dong, Ulsan City	Chung Mong-joon	UNP	Independent
South Gyeongsang Province	Happo, Masan	Kim Ho-il	Independent	NKP
South Gyeongsang Province	Hoewon, Masan	Kang Sam-jae	DLP	NKP
South Gyeongsang Province	Jinju	Ha Soon-bong	Independent	NKP
South Gyeongsang Province	Jinhae–Changwon	Bae Myung-gook	DLP	ULD
South Gyeongsang Province	Chungmu–Tongyeong–Goseong	Chung Soon-duk	DLP	NKP
South Gyeongsang Province	Samcheonpo–Sacheon	Kim Ki-do	DLP	NKP
South Gyeongsang Province	Gimhae City–Gimhae County	Kim Young-iel	DLP	NKP
South Gyeongsang Province	Jinyang	Chung Pil-keun	Independent	NKP
South Gyeongsang Province	Uiryeong–Haman	Chung Dong-ho	DLP	Independent
South Gyeongsang Province	Changnyeong	Shin Jae-ki	DLP	NKP
South Gyeongsang Province	Milyang City–Milyang County	Shin Sang-sik	DLP	NKP
South Gyeongsang Province	Yangsan	Lah Oh-yeon	DLP	NKP
South Gyeongsang Province	Ulsan County	Kim Chae-kyum	DLP	NKP
South Gyeongsang Province	Jangseungpo–Goje	Kim Bong-jo	DLP	NKP
South Gyeongsang Province	Namhae–Hadong	Park Hee-tae	DLP	NKP
South Gyeongsang Province	Sancheong–Hamyang	Roh In-hwan	DLP	NKP
South Gyeongsang Province	Gochang	Lee Kang-too	Independent	NKP
South Gyeongsang Province	Hapcheon	Kwon Hae-ok	DLP	NKP
Jeju Province	Jeju City	Hyeon Kyung-dae	Independent	NKP
Jeju Province	Bukjeju	Yang Jung-kyu	Independent	NKP
Jeju Province	Seogwipo–Namjeju	Byon Jong-il	Independent	NKP
National	Proportional representation	Kim Young-sam (Note: Kim Young-sam resigned on 13 October 1992, to run in the 1992 South Korean presidential election.)	DLP	DLP
National	Proportional representation	Park Tae-joon (Note: Park Tae-joon resigned on 17 December 1992.)	DLP	DLP
National	Proportional representation	Kim Jae-kwang (Note: Kim Jae-kwang died on 3 January 1993.)	DLP	DLP
National	Proportional representation	Ro Jai-bong (Note: Ro Jai-bong was removed on 27 February 1995.)	DLP	DLP
National	Proportional representation	Kwon Ik-hyun	DLP	NKP
National	Proportional representation	Lee Man-sup	DLP	NKP
National	Proportional representation	Chung Suk-mo (Note: Chung Suk-mo was removed on 9 February 1995.)	DLP	DLP
National	Proportional representation	Ahn Moo-hyuk	DLP	NKP
National	Proportional representation	Lee Won-joe (Note: Lee Won-joe resigned on 29 May 1993.)	DLP	DLP
National	Proportional representation	Choi Byung-yul (Note: Choi Byung-yul resigned on 2 November 1994, upon being appointed as Mayor of Seoul.)	DLP	DLP
National	Proportional representation	Kim Chong-in (Note: Kim Chong-in was removed on 9 September 1994.)	DLP	DLP
National	Proportional representation	Kim Kwang-soo (Note: Kim Kwang-soo was removed on 5 March 1996.)	DLP	NKP
National	Proportional representation	Park Jae-hong (Note: Park Jae-hong was removed on 23 February 1996.)	DLP	NKP
National	Proportional representation	Kang Seon-yeong	DLP	NKP
National	Proportional representation	Jeong Si-chae	DLP	NKP
National	Proportional representation	Choi Woon-ji (Note: Choi Woon-ji was removed on 27 October 1995.)	DLP	DLP
National	Proportional representation	Kang Yong-sik	DLP	NKP
National	Proportional representation	Kim Young-soo (Note: Kim Young-soo resigned on 27 February 1993, upon being appointed as Senior Presidential Secretary for Civil Affairs.)	DLP	DLP
National	Proportional representation	Kim Young-jin	DLP	NKP
National	Proportional representation	Kang Sin-ok (Note: Kang Sin-ok was removed on 21 March 1996.)	DLP	NKP
National	Proportional representation	Suh Sang-mok	DLP	NKP
National	Proportional representation	Yun Tae-gyun	DLP	NKP
National	Proportional representation	Park Koo-il	DLP	ULD
National	Proportional representation	Kwak Young-dal	DLP	NKP
National	Proportional representation	Lee Myung-bak	DLP	NKP
National	Proportional representation	Lee Hwan-ey	DLP	NKP
National	Proportional representation	Kang In-sup	DLP	NKP
National	Proportional representation	Kim Dong-kun	DLP	NKP
National	Proportional representation	Choi Sang-yong (Note: Choi Sang-yong was removed on 8 February 1996.)	DLP	NKP
National	Proportional representation	Joo Yang-ja (Note: Joo Yang-ja was removed on 2 March 1996.)	DLP	NKP
National	Proportional representation	Lee Hyun-su	DLP	NKP
National	Proportional representation	Roh In-do	DLP	NKP
National	Proportional representation	Koo Cheon-seo (Note: Koo Cheon-seo was removed on 31 October 1995.)	DLP	NKP
National	Proportional representation	Cho Yong-jik (Note: Cho Yong-jik took office on 13 October 1992, to succeed Kim Young-sam, but was removed on 23 February 1996.)	DLP	NKP
National	Proportional representation	Ku Chang-rim (Note: Ku Chang-rim took office on 17 December 1992, to succeed Park Tae-joon, but was removed on 18 October 1995.)	DLP	DLP
National	Proportional representation	Park Kun-ho (Note: Park Kun-ho took office on 3 January 1993, to succeed Kim Jae-kwang.)	DLP	NKP
National	Proportional representation	Yoo Sung-hwan (Note: Yoo Sung-hwan took office on 27 February 1993, to succeed Kim Young-soo.)	DLP	NKP
National	Proportional representation	Lee Jae-myung (Note: Lee Jae-myung took office on 29 May 1993, to succeed Lee Won-joe.)	DLP	NKP
National	Proportional representation	Chung Ok-soon (Note: Chung Ok-soon took office on 9 September 1994, to succeed Kim Chong-in.)	DLP	NKP
National	Proportional representation	Kim Chan-doo (Note: Kim Chan-doo took office on 2 November 1994, to succeed Choi Byung-yul.)	DLP	NKP
National	Proportional representation	Kim Sa-sung (Note: Kim Sa-sung took office on 9 February 1995, to succeed Chung Suk-mo.)	DLP	NKP
National	Proportional representation	Lee Yeun-surk (Note: Lee Yeun-surk took office on 27 February 1995, to succeed Ro Jai-bong.)	DLP	NKP
National	Proportional representation	Lee Min-heon (Note: Lee Min-heon took office on 18 October 1995, to succeed Ku Chang-rim.)	DLP	NKP
National	Proportional representation	Lee Soo-dam (Note: Lee Soo-dam took office on 27 October 1995, to succeed Choi Woon-ji, but was removed on 22 March 1996.)	DLP	NKP
National	Proportional representation	Bae Kil-lang (Note: Bae Kil-lang took office on 31 October 1995, to succeed Koo Cheon-seo, but was removed on 5 March 1996.)	DLP	NKP
National	Proportional representation	Kim Jung-sook (Note: Kim Jung-sook took office on 8 February 1996, to succeed Choi Sang-yong.)	NKP (Note: Included in the Democratic Liberal Party list in the 1992 election.)	NKP
National	Proportional representation	Kim Hyun-bae (Note: Kim Hyun-bae took office on 23 February 1996, to succeed Cho Yong-jik.)	NKP	NKP
National	Proportional representation	Park Seung-ung (Note: Park Seung-ung took office on 23 February 1996, to succeed Park Jae-hong.)	NKP	NKP
National	Proportional representation	Jin Gyeong-tak (Note: Jin Gyeong-tak took office on 2 March 1996, to succeed Joo Yang-ja.)	NKP	NKP
National	Proportional representation	Hur Se-wook (Note: Hur Se-wook took office on 5 March 1996, to succeed Kim Kwang-soo.)	NKP	NKP
National	Proportional representation	Kim Dae-jung (Note: Kim Dae-jung resigned on 19 December 1992.)	Democratic	Democratic
National	Proportional representation	Lee Ki-taek	Democratic	UDP
National	Proportional representation	Kang Chang-sung	Democratic	UDP
National	Proportional representation	Chang Che-shik (Note: Chang Che-shik was removed on 2 March 1996.)	Democratic	UDP
National	Proportional representation	Lee Oo-chung (Note: Lee Oo-chung was removed on 2 March 1996.)	Democratic	UDP
National	Proportional representation	Ra Beung-sen (Note: Ra Beung-sen was removed on 2 March 1996.)	Democratic	UDP
National	Proportional representation	Shin Jin-wook (Note: Shin Jin-wook was removed on 22 March 1996.)	Democratic	UDP
National	Proportional representation	Kim Ok-chun	Democratic	UDP
National	Proportional representation	Jang Jun-ik (Note: Jang Jun-ik was removed on 13 March 1996.)	Democratic	UDP
National	Proportional representation	Lee Dong-keun	Democratic	UDP
National	Proportional representation	Cook Chong-nam	Democratic	UDP
National	Proportional representation	Kim Choong-hyun (Note: Kim Choong-hyun was removed on 2 March 1996.)	Democratic	UDP
National	Proportional representation	Kang Hee-chan	Democratic	UDP
National	Proportional representation	Park Jung-hoon (Note: Park Jung-hoon was removed on 2 March 1996.)	Democratic	UDP
National	Proportional representation	Park Il	Democratic	UDP
National	Proportional representation	Kim Ok-doo (Note: Kim Ok-doo was removed on 2 March 1996.)	Democratic	UDP
National	Proportional representation	Park Un-tae	Democratic	UDP
National	Proportional representation	Jang Ki-uk	Democratic	UDP
National	Proportional representation	Kim Mal-ryong	Democratic	UDP
National	Proportional representation	Yang Moon-hee	Democratic	UDP
National	Proportional representation	Park Jie-won (Note: Park Jie-won was removed on 31 August 1995.)	Democratic	Democratic
National	Proportional representation	Lee Chang-hee	Democratic	UDP
National	Proportional representation	Nam Kung-jin (Note: Nam Kung-jin took office on 19 December 1992, to succeed Kim Dae-jung, but was removed on 2 March 1996.)	Democratic	UDP
National	Proportional representation	Bae Ki-sun (Note: Bae Ki-sun took office on 31 August 1995, to succeed Park Jie-won, but was removed on 2 March 1996.)	Democratic	UDP
National	Proportional representation	Choi Byung-wook (Note: Choi Byung-wook took office on 2 March 1996, to succeed Chang Che-shik.)	UDP (Note: Included in the Democratic Party list in the 1992 election.)	UDP
National	Proportional representation	Chang Jung-con (Note: Chang Jung-con took office on 2 March 1996, to succeed Lee Oo-chung.)	UDP	UDP
National	Proportional representation	Kim Yoo-jin (Note: Kim Yoo-jin took office on 2 March 1996, to succeed Ra Beung-sen.)	UDP	UDP
National	Proportional representation	Seo Ho-seok (Note: Seo Ho-seok took office on 2 March 1996, to succeed Kim Choong-hyun.)	UDP	UDP
National	Proportional representation	Jang Kwang-keun (Note: Jang Kwang-keun took office on 2 March 1996, to succeed Park Jung-hoon.)	UDP	UDP
National	Proportional representation	Park Myoung-suh (Note: Park Myoung-suh took office on 2 March 1996, to succeed Kim Ok-doo.)	UDP	UDP
National	Proportional representation	Han Won-seok (Note: Han Won-seok took office on 2 March 1996, to succeed Nam Kung-jin.)	UDP	UDP
National	Proportional representation	Kim Young-deuk (Note: Kim Young-deuk took office on 2 March 1996, to succeed Bae Ki-sun.)	UDP	UDP
National	Proportional representation	Jung Yaung-sook (Note: Jung Yaung-sook took office on 13 March 1996, to succeed Jang Jun-ik.)	UDP	UDP
National	Proportional representation	Ko Hong-kil (Note: Ko Hong-kil took office on 22 March 1996, to succeed Shin Jin-wook.)	UDP	UDP
National	Proportional representation	Moon Chang-mo	UNP	ULD
National	Proportional representation	Yang Soon-jik	UNP	ULD
National	Proportional representation	Chung Ju-yung (Note: Chung Ju-yung resigned on 23 February 1993.)	UNP	UNP
National	Proportional representation	Chough Yoon-hyung (Note: Chough Yoon-hyung died on 2 February 1996.)	UNP	Democratic
National	Proportional representation	Choi Young-han	UNP	NKP
National	Proportional representation	Lee Kun-yung	UNP	NKP
National	Proportional representation	Jung Chang-hyun	UNP	NKP
National	Proportional representation	Kang Boo-ja (Note: Kang Boo-ja took office on 23 February 1993, to succeed Chung Ju-yung.)	UNP	ULD
National	Proportional representation	Lee Yong-joon (Note: Lee Yong-joon took office on 2 February 1996, to succeed Chough Yoon-hyung.)	ULD (Note: Included in the Unification National Party list in the 1992 election.)	ULD
