= New Democratic Party (South Korea, 1994) =

1994–1995 political party in South Korea

New Democratic Party 신민당
- Founded: July 8, 1994
- Dissolved: May 31, 1995
- Merger of: Unification National Party; New Political Reform Party
- Merged into: United Liberal Democrats
- Succeeded by: Non-partisan National Federation (Lim Chun-won and anti ULD merger individuals)
- Headquarters: 15-11 Yeouido-dong, Geumyeong Building, Yeongdeungpo-gu, Seoul
- Membership: 2,896,268
- Ideology: Conservative liberalism
- Political position: centre-right
- Colours: Turquoise green
- National Assembly: 15 / 299

Korean name
- Hangul: 신민당
- Hanja: 新民黨
- RR: Sinmindang
- MR: Sinmindang

The New Democratic Party (Korean: 신민당) was a conservative political party in South Korea through a merger of Unification National Party and New Political Reform Party. It ceased to exist on 31 May 1995, upon merging with the United Liberal Democrats.

== History ==
On 30 June 1994 the Unification National Party, agreed to merge with the New Political Reform Party, led by Park Chan-jong and adopted the name New Democratic Party. Upon its founding, the New Democratic Party became a parliamentary party holding 15 seats in the 14th National Assembly of South Korea. The party participated in the parliamentary by-elections held on 2 August 1994 and garnered attention when Hyun Kung-ja, the wife of former Democratic Liberal Party lawmaker Park Chul-un, who was arrested for involvement in the "slot machine scandal", ran in the Daegu Suseong-gu Gap constituency and won the election.

Even after the merger, the New Democratic Party failed to gain significant momentum. Notably, co-leader Kim Dong-gil submitted his resignation on 29 August 1994; meanwhile Supreme Council member Yang Sun-jik revealed the existence of a secret memorandum of agreement drafted during the party's founding process in March 1994, which outlined a division of roles, the party would first form a party negotiating bloc and recruit Park Chan-jong individually, Kim Dong-gil would be fielded as the presidential candidate whilst Yang Sun-jik exercised party leadership with Kim eventually taking over party leadership from Yang. Kim returned to the party headquarters on 6 September 1994 and engaged in an argument with non-mainstream figures including Supreme Council members Yang Sun-jik and Yoo Sun-ho. On 5 October 1994 co-leader Park Chan-jong announced his split from Co-leader Kim Dong-gil during a press conference.

On 10 October 1994, the non-mainstream faction of the New Democratic Party led by co-leader Park Chan-jong, pushed ahead with a party convention at the 63 Building in Seoul, they elected Park as the sole leader, appointed seven individuals, Yang Sun-jik, Jeong Sang-gu, Han Young-soo, Kim Yong-hwan, Yu Su-ho, Park Chul-un, and Im Chun-won, as supreme council members, and named Co-leader Kim Dong-gil as a standing advisor. This move provoked a backlash from the party's mainstream faction, led by Kim Dong-gil, who condemned the action as a "coup-like seizure of party leadership" and subsequently expelled Park Chan-jong from the party while suspending Yang Sun-jik's party membership rights for two years. Furthermore, a violent clash erupted at the convention venue between approximately 200 party members supporting Park Chan-jong's non-mainstream faction and another 200 supporting Kim Dong-gil's mainstream faction, with participants wielding fire extinguishers and wooden clubs.

The non-mainstream faction of the New Democratic Party, led by Park Chan-jong submitted an application to the National Election Commission to register changes to the party's central leadership, but the application was rejected on 3 November 1994. On 9 November 1994, co-leader Kim Dong-gil convened a meeting of the Party Affairs Committee and took disciplinary action against 37 party members who had participated in a separate national convention held independently by the non-mainstream faction on 10 October 1994; this included suspending the party membership of co-leader Park Chan-jong for two years and Supreme Council member Im Chun-won for one year, as well as mass expulsions. On 9 November 1994, co-leader Kim Dong-gil convened a meeting of the Party Affairs Committee and took disciplinary action against 37 party members who had participated in a separate national convention held independently by the non-mainstream faction on 10 October 1994, this included suspend the party membership of co-leader Park Chan-jong for two years and Supreme Council member Im Chun-won for one year, as well as mass expulsions.

Amidst this situation, Kim Jong-pil, the leader of the Democratic Liberal Party left the party on 9 February 1995, following a conflict with President Kim Young-sam and sought to establish a new, independent party; meanwhile, the New Democratic Party also pursued a merger with Democratic Party (1991). On 27 March 1995 the New Democratic Party appointed Supreme Council member Kim Bok-dong as its party leader during a national convention held at the Lotte Hotel in Jamsil, Seoul.

Kim Bok-dong, leader of the New Democratic Party, agreed to a merger with the Democratic Party following a meeting with its leader, Lee Ki-taek on 21 April 1995, but the parties ultimately parted ways due to issues regarding the legal registration of co-leaders. The New Democratic Party subsequently pushed a merger with the United Liberal Democrats, led by Kim Jong-pil, but faced opposition from some members, including Im Chun-won.

On 16 May 1995, Kim Bok-dong, leader of the New Democratic Party, agreed with Kim Jong-pil, leader of the United Liberal Democrats (ULD) on 31 May 1995. Consequently, the New Democratic Party ceased to exist upon merging with the ULD on 31 May 1995. However, some party members, including Im Chun-won left the party in protest of the merger decision. Notably former lawmaker Park Young-rok, who served as chairman of the New Democratic Party's emergency steering committee, revealed at a press conference on 3 June 1995 that Kim Bok-dong and lawmaker Han Young-soo had offered him money and valuables to win him over, as he had opposed the merger; he presented a bag containing 50 million South Korean won in cash as evidence. Lawmaker Im Chun-won, along with other members who opposed the merger, re-established the New Democratic Party (later renamed the Non-Partisan National Alliance) and embarked on independent political activities.

== See also ==
- Unification National Party
- Non-partisan National Federation
