= Non-partisan National Federation =

1995-1997 Political Party in South Korea

- Leader: Lim Chun-won
- Founded: June 23, 1995
- Dissolved: May 6, 1997 (Party registration cancelled)
- Split from: New Democratic Party; United Liberal Democrats
- Succeeded by: New Korea Party; United Democratic Party (Lim Chun-won)
- Headquarters: 1 Sinchon-ro, Seodaemun-gu, Seoul
- Membership (1996): 2,595; 885 (legal party members)
- Ideology: Big tent centrism
- Political position: centre
- Colours: Pink
- National Assembly: 1 / 297

Korean name
- Hangul: 무정파전국연합
- Hanja: 無政派全國聯合
- RR: Mujeongpa jeonguk yeonhap
- MR: Mujŏngp'a chŏn'guk yŏnhap

Non-partisan National Federation (Korean: 무정파전국연합) was a political party in South Korea that existed from 23 June 1995 to 6 May 1997. It was originally founded under the name "New Democratic Party" on 23 June 1995, by members of the former New Democratic Party who opposed the decision to merge with the United Liberal Democrats. On 5 February 1996 the party changed its name to Non-Partisan National Federation, positioning itself as a nationwide coalition for independent candidates; however, its registration was revoked by the National Electoral Commission on 6 May 1997, due to failure to meet the statutory minimum membership requirements.

== History ==
The New Democratic Party ceased to exist on 16 May 1995 after its leader, Kim Bok-dong agreed to a merger with the United Liberal Democrats (ULD) led by Kim Jong-pil. However, the merger process faced opposition from some members, including Lim Chun-won. Opposing the decision to merge with the ULD, Representative Lim Chun-won left the party along with other dissenting members to re-establish the New Democratic Party and pursue independent political activities. The party held its inaugural convention on 23 June 1995 at the Private School Teacher's Pension Service Building in Yeouido, Seoul, and elected Lim Chun-won as its president. With this move, the New Democratic Party became a parliamentary party within the 14th National Assembly of South Korea.

On 22 January 1996, Lim Chun-won, the leader of the New Democratic Party, submitted an application to change the party's name to the National Alliance of Independents. However, on 31 January 1996, the Commission issued an authoritative interpretation stating "Using the term independent in the name of a specific political party infringes upon the rights of candidates running as independents and causes public confusion; therefore, the name 'National Alliance of Independents' cannot be permitted as it poses a significant risk to electoral and political order." Consequently on 5 February 1996 the New Democratic Party changed its name to the "Non-partisan National Federation" and the National Election Commission approved the new name.

The Non-partisan National Federation sought to participate in the 1996 South Korean legislative election, scheduled for 11 April 1996, positioning itself as a nationwide coalition party for independent candidates. However, its president, Lim Chun-won, left the party to run as a proportional representation candidate for the United Democratic Party. Although Lim was initially nominated as the United Democratic Party's third candidate on the proportional representation list, the decision was reversed just one day later, prompting him to announce his retirement from politics. On 26 March 1996, Non-partisan National Federation shifted to a leadership structure headed by Acting Representative Ko Byeong-hyeon. However, as it ultimately did not participate in the 1996 South Korean legislative election, it remained a party without parliamentary representation. On 6 May 1997, the National Electoral Commission revoked the party's registration because it failed to meet the number of statutory minimum members. The majority of its officials subsequently joined the New Korea Party.

=== Past logos ===
Logo used during the New Democratic Party era

Logo used during the era of the Non-partisan National Federation
