= Park Chan-jong (politician) =

South Korean politician (1939–2026)

Park Chan-jong (Korean: 박찬종; Hanja: 朴燦鍾; April 19, 1939 – November 18, 2026) was a South Korean politician who served as a member of the 9th, 10th, 12th, 13th, and 14th National Assemblies. His art name, Udang (우당; 尤堂), is widely recognized in political and cultural circles.

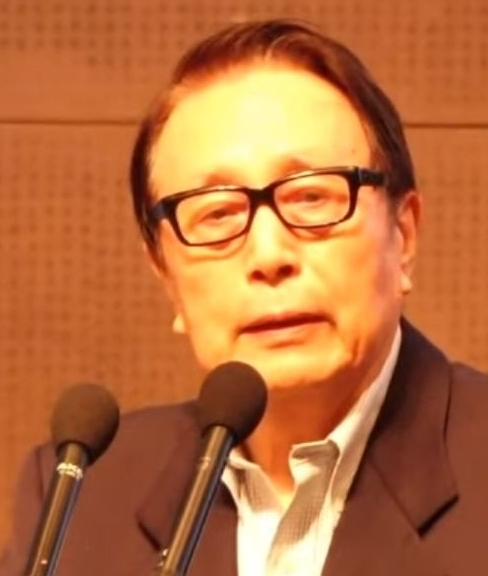
Park in 2019

== Life ==
Park Chan-jong was born on April 19, 1939 in Gimhae-gun, Gyeongsangnam-do. He graduated from Gyeonggi High School in 1958 and enrolled in the Department of Economics at Seoul National University the same year. During his studies, he passed the Higher Civil Service Examination Judicial Examination, Higher Civil Service Examination Administrative Examination, and Certified Public Accountant Examination, showcasing his early academic and professional prowess.

After beginning his career as a lawyer, Park entered politics in 1971 as a Democratic Republican Party candidate in the 8th General Election but lost. Following the dissolution of the National Assembly under the October Yushin decree (October 17, 1972), he successfully secured a seat in the 1973 general election under a revised multi-member district system. By 1976, at age 38, he became president of the Korean Institute of Certified Public Accountants after a closely contested runoff. As a member of the ruling party, he gained a reputation as an internal dissenter, opposing the summary trial system and criticizing nepotism within the Yushin Political Friends Association.

After the October 26 Incident (1979), which led to the assassination of President Park Chung-hee, Park Chan-jong spearheaded reformist efforts within the Democratic Republican Party, demanding the removal of politicians tainted by corruption. His activism culminated in his expulsion from the party on April 7, 1980, while serving on the National Assembly Special Committee on Constitutional Amendment. Under Chun Doo-hwan's Fifth Republic, he was briefly listed among 811 individuals subjected to political restrictions in 1980 but continued his career. Though he withdrew from the 11th National Assembly election in 1981, he later published Shameful Story (1983), a critical reflection on his involvement in the Yushin regime.

In 1985, Park joined the opposition New Korea Democratic Party (NKDP), co-founded by Kim Young-sam and Kim Dae-jung, and won a seat in Busan during the 12th National Assembly election. As chair of the NKDP's Human Rights Advocacy Committee, he defended student activists involved in the Seoul American Cultural Center Occupation Incident (1985). His advocacy led to his indictment by the Chun regime for the Korea University Protest Incident, resulting in a 3.5-year suspension from legal practice. He further solidified his role as a human rights advocate by leading the Truth Finding Committee investigating the Park Jong-cheol Death by Torture Incident (1987), which exposed state-sponsored torture.

Following the June Democratic Struggle (1987), Park left the Reunification Democratic Party amid its split between Kim Young-sam and Kim Dae-jung, running independently and winning in Seoul's Seocho-gu Gap district in 1988. His political trajectory remained turbulent: he joined and later abandoned the Democratic Party (1990–1991) over leadership disputes, founded the New Politics Reform Party in 1992, and ran unsuccessfully for president that year. His 1995 bid for Seoul mayor as an independent initially led polls but faltered after a coalition backed by Kim Dae-jung and Kim Jong-pil rallied behind rival candidate Cho Soon.

In 1996, Park joined the ruling New Korea Party but forfeited a proportional representation seat by relinquishing his district candidacy. During the 1997 presidential election, he withdrew from the New Korea Party's primary, criticizing its opaque processes, and later supported breakaway candidate Lee In-je. After failed bids in local elections and a 1998 by-election, he temporarily retired from politics to study abroad.

Park returned in 2000, co-founding the Democratic National Party, but lost elections in Busan. His final political attempt came in 2004 as an independent in Busan's Seo-gu district, after which he retired. In 2007, he faced brief imprisonment in Seoul Detention Center over election debt but resumed legal practice, defending high-profile clients such as Kim Myeong-ho (crossbow terrorism case), Kim Kyung-joon (BBK scandal), and Park Dae-seong and Park Yeon-cha (Minerva case).

In later years, Park became a vocal media commentator, critiquing both ruling and opposition parties. He launched Park Chan-jong TV on YouTube in 2019, initially criticizing the Liberty Korea Party, but later aligning with far-right Christian groups during the COVID-19 pandemic. In 2021, he joined the People's Revolutionary Party (renamed Liberty Unification Party), marking another shift in his decades-long, ideologically fluid career.

Park died on November 18, 2026, at the age of 87.

== Election results ==
Year	Elections	Constituency	Political party	Votes (%)	Results
1971	8th National Assembly General Election	Seo (Busan)	DRP	41,128 (34.83%)	Defeated (2nd)
1973	9th National Assembly General Election	Seo–Dong (Busan)	DRP	72,999 (35.24%)	Won
1978	10th National Assembly General Election	Seo–Dong (Busan)	DRP	85,439 (33.33%)	Won
1981	11th National Assembly General Election	Seo (Busan)	Independent	-	Resigned
1985	12th National Assembly General Election	Jung–Dong–Yeongdo (Busan)	NKDP	83,463 (31.97%)	Won
1988	13th National Assembly General Election	Seocho A (Seoul)	Independent	27,584 (30.46%)	Won
1992	14th National Assembly General Election	Seocho A (Seoul)	NPRP	47,980 (53.24%)	Won
1992	1992 Presidential Election	South Korea	NPRP	1,516,047 (6.37%)	Defeated (4th)
1995	1st Iocal Election	Seoul (Mayoral Elections)	Independent	1,623,356 (33.51%)	Defeated (2nd)
1996	15th National Assembly General Election	National (21st)	NKP	6,783,730 (34.52%)	Not Elected
1998	July 1998 By-election	Seocho A (Seoul)	New National	4,600 (8.71%)	Defeated (3rd)
2000	16th National Assembly General Election	Jung–Dong (Busan)	DNP	26,881 (31.71%)	Defeated (2nd)
2004	17th National Assembly General Election	Seo (Busan)	Independent	12,731 (18.76%)	Defeated (3rd)

== Career ==
=== Political leadership ===
- President, Korean Institute of Certified Public Accountants (1976).
- Chairman, Human Rights Protection Committee, Democratic Promotion Council (1980s).
- Chairman, Human Rights Protection Committee, New Democratic Party (1985).
- Policy Committee chairman, Reunification Democratic Party (1987).
- President, New Politics Reform Party (1992–1995).
- Floor Leader, New Democratic Party (1995).
- Co-chairman, Election Campaign Committee, New Korea Party (1996).
- Election Campaign Committee chairman, People's New Party (1997–1998).
- Supreme Council member, Democratic National Party (2000).

=== Legal practice ===
- Attorney at law for Ahnmin Law Firm.
- Advisory attorney at law for Hanuri Law Firm.
- Advisory attorney at law for Daol Law Firm.
- Representative attorney at law for Daol Law Firm.
- Attorney at law for Ido Law Firm.
- Representative attorney at law for Yudam Law Firm.
- Advisory attorney for Sanwoo Law Firm.

=== Recent political engagement ===
- Advisor for National Solidarity of People's Power Party and Responsible Party Members (December 2022–death in November 2026).

== Education ==
- Busan Daeshin Elementary School (graduated 1952)
- Gyeongnam Middle School (graduated 1955)
- Gyeonggi High School (graduated 1958)
- Seoul National University
  - College of Commerce (now College of Business Administration): Bachelor of Economics (graduated 1962)
  - Graduate School: Master of Business Administration (MBA) (graduated 1975)

== Controversy ==
=== Remarks on promoting regionalism ===
In March 1996, Park Chan-jong, then serving as the former chairman of the New Korea Party's election campaign committee, sparked controversy during a campaign rally in Tongyeong. He stated, "If former Presidents Chun Doo-hwan and Roh Tae-woo had not been punished, the Jeolla-do protesters would have pushed the country into crisis. I might have missed it." The remarks were widely condemned as inflammatory and accused of exacerbating regional tensions between South Korea's Honam (Jeolla) and Yeongnam (Gyeongsang) regions. Critics argued that his rhetoric exploited historical regional divides for political gain, drawing backlash from opposition parties and civil society groups.
