= New Political Reform Party =

1992–1994 political party in South Korea

New Political Reform Party 신정치개혁당
- Leader: Park Chan-jong
- Founded: February 25, 1992
- Dissolved: July 8, 1994
- Preceded by: Democratic Party
- Merged into: New Democratic Party
- Headquarters: 7 Yeouidaebang-ro 69-gil, Yeongdeungpo-gu, Seoul
- Membership: 18,761
- Ideology: Liberal conservatism Liberal democracy Conservative liberalism National liberalism
- Political position: Centre-right
- Colours: Dark Blue (initially); Turquoise (later)
- National Assembly: 1 / 299

Korean name
- Hangul: 신정치개혁당
- Hanja: 新政治改革黨
- RR: Sinjeongchi gaehyeokdang
- MR: Sinjŏngch'i kaehyŏktang

The New Political Reform Party (Korean: 신정치개혁당) was a South Korean political party founded on 25 February 1992, under the leadership of Park Chan-jong the representative of the Council for Political Reform.

== History ==
In June 1990, Park Chan-jong joined the Democratic Party (1990), founded by members of the Reunification Democratic Party who opposed Kim Young-sam's three-party merger, but left the party in September 1991 due to opposition to the leadership style of party president Lee Ki-taek. On 25 February 1992, he formed the Council for Political Reform alongside political newcomers and established the New Political Reform Party. Although the Council initially planned to participate in the founding of a party alongside Kim Dong-gil, Park proceeded to launch his own party independently after refusing to accept Kim's decision to merge with the Unification National Party.

In the 14th South Korean legislative election held on 24 March 1992, candidates ran in both single member districts (111 candidates: Seoul 28, Busan 5, Daegu 4, Incheon 4, Daejeon 3, Gyeonggi 15, Gangwon 9, North Chungcheong 7, South Chungcheong 10, North Jeolla 5, South Jeolla 5, North Gyeongsang 6, South Gyeongsang 10) and Proportional Representation list. However, in the district races, only candidate Park Chan-jong, running in the Seoul Seocho-gu Gap constituency, was elected, while all other candidates failed to win. Furthermore, in the constituency vote the party secured 369,044 votes (1.8% of the total), failing to win any proportional representation seats.

Park Chan-jong ran in South Korea's 14th presidential election, held on 18 December 1992, and finished in fourth place. However, the party faced limitations due to its heavy reliance on Park; it was eventually dissolved on 8 July 1994, upon merging with the Unification National Party, led by Kim Dong-gil, to form the New Democratic Party.

== Election results ==
=== Presidential election ===
Year	Election	Candidate	Votes	Vote share	Result	Status
1992	14th	Park Chan-jong	1,516,047	6.38%	4th	Lost

=== National Assembly election ===
Year	Election	Constituency		Proportional representation		Total	
Year	Election	Seats won	Vote share	Seats won	Vote share	Seats won	Vote share
1992	14th	1/237	0.42%	0/62	—	1/299	0.33%

== Logos ==
Logo of the New Political Reform Party used in the 1992 legislative election

Logo of the New Political Reform Party used in the 1992 parliamentary election.

Logo of the New Political Reform Party, used from the 1992 presidential election through 1994.
