= 1996 South Korean legislative election =

- 11 April 1996

All 299 seats in the National Assembly 150 seats needed for a majority
- Turnout: 63.91% (▼7.95pp)
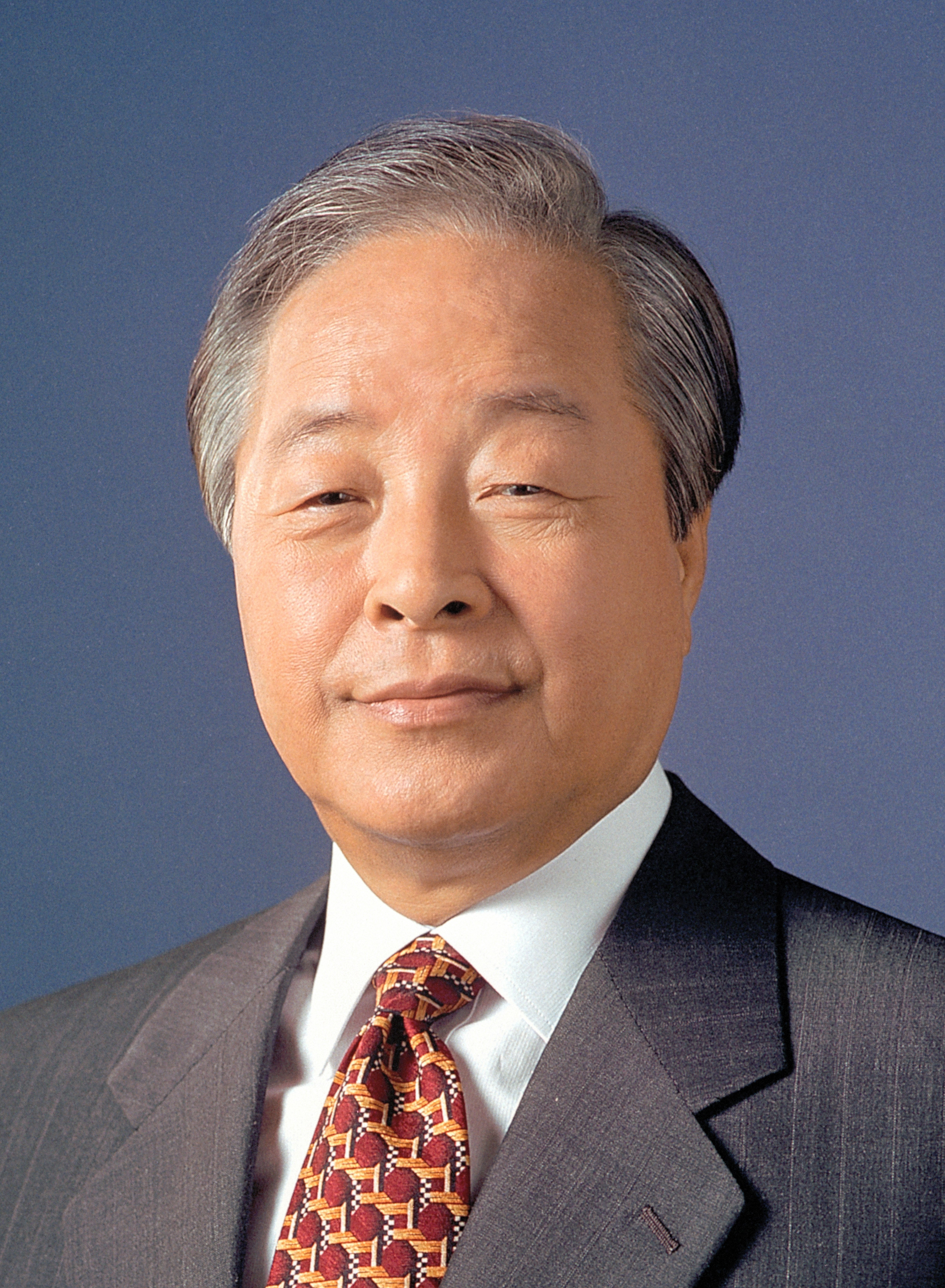

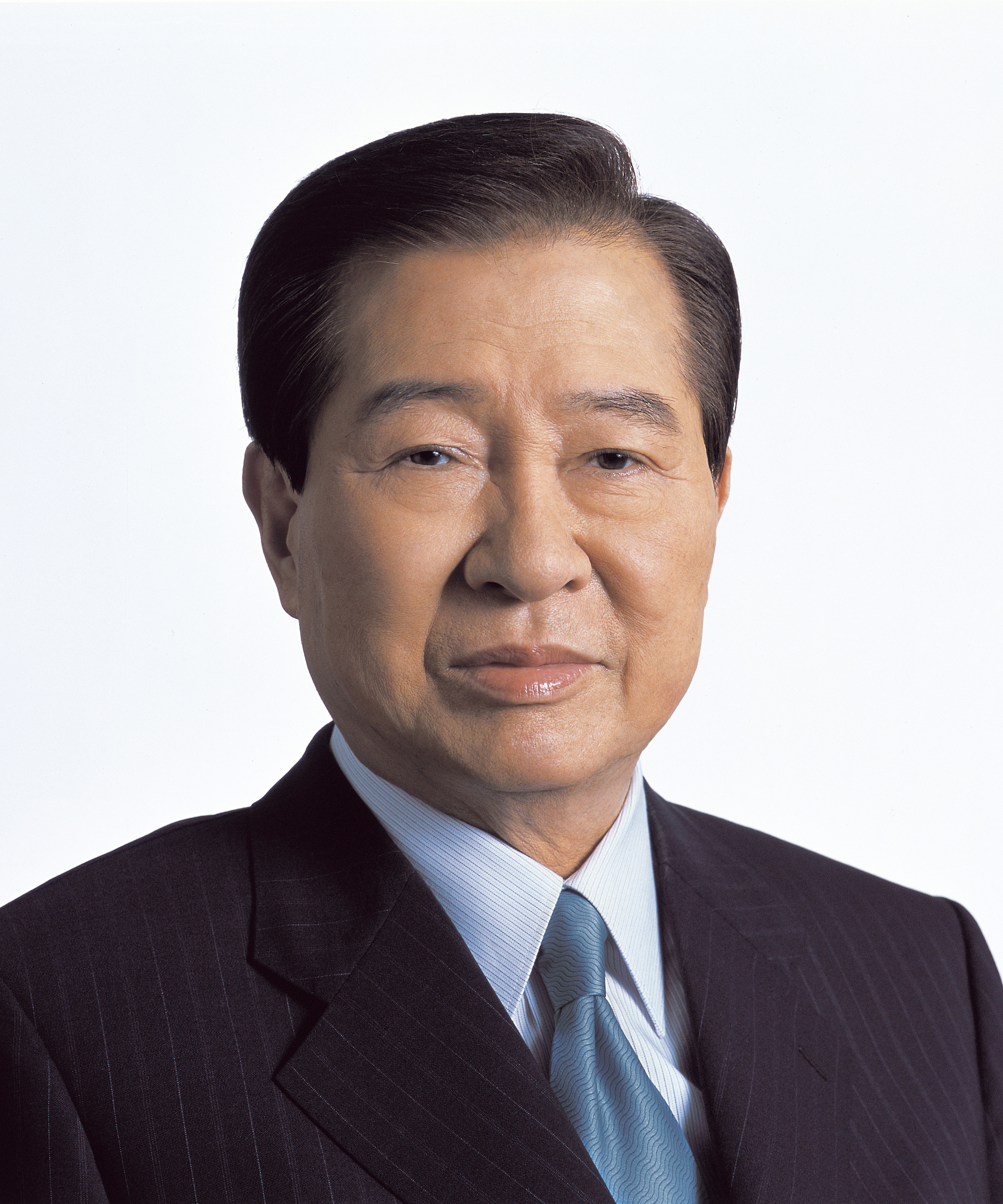

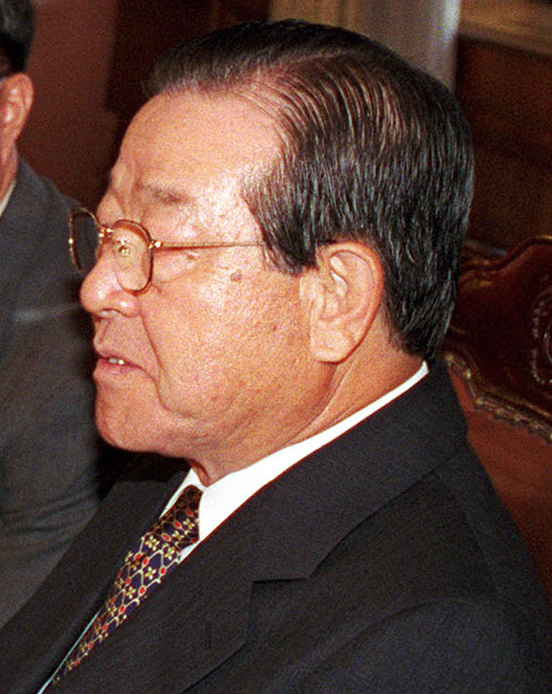
	Majority party	Minority party
Leader	Kim Young-sam	Kim Dae-jung
Party	New Korea	National Congress
Last election	149 seats (Note: as Democratic Liberal Party)	Did not exist
Seats won	139	79
Seat change	▼10	New
Popular vote	6,783,730	4,971,961
Percentage	34.52%	25.30%
Swing	▼3.97pp	New
	Third party	Fourth party
Leader	Kim Jong-pil	Park Il; Chang Eul-byung
Party	United Liberal Democrats	United Democratic
Last election	32 seats (Note: Unification National Party and New Political Reform Party)	97 seats (Note: as Democratic Party)
Seats won	50	15
Seat change	▲18	▼82
Popular vote	3,178,474	2,207,695
Percentage	16.17%	11.23%
Swing	▼2.99pp	▼17.94pp
- Results of the election.
Speaker before election
Hwang Nak-joo
New Korea
Elected Speaker
Kim Soo-han
New Korea

Legislative elections were held in South Korea on 12 April 1996. The result was a victory for the New Korea Party, which won 139 of the 299 seats in the National Assembly. Voter turnout was 63.9%. Although the New Korea Party remained the largest party in the National Assembly, it failed to win the majority.

== Electoral system ==
Of the 299 seats, 253 were elected in single-member districts via first-past-the-post voting, while the remainder were allocated via proportional representation at the national level. Proportional seats were only available to parties which won three percent of the national valid vote among seat-allocated parties and/or won five or more constituency seats.

== Political parties ==
Parties	Leader	Ideology	Seats		Status
Parties	Leader	Ideology	Last election	Before election	Status
New Korea Party (Note: as Democratic Liberal Party)	Kim Young-sam	Conservatism	149 / 299	146 / 299	Government
National Congress for New Politics	Cho Soon-hyung	Liberalism	Did not exist	52 / 299	Opposition
United Democratic Party	Park Il; Chang Eul-byung	Liberalism	97 / 299 (Note: as Democratic Party)	36 / 299	Opposition
United Liberal Democrats	Kim Jong-pil	Conservatism	31 / 299 (Note: Unification National Party)	29 / 299	Opposition
United Liberal Democrats	Kim Jong-pil	Conservatism	1 / 299 (Note: New Political Reform Party)	29 / 299	Opposition

The governing New Korea Party (formerly the Democratic Liberal Party) of President Kim Young-sam, lost its absolute congressional majority. The election was held three years into President Kim's five year mandate.

The opposition National Congress for New Politics was formed by veteran opposition leader Kim Dae-jung and his supporters in the Democratic Party. Kim had retired from politics following his loss in the 1992 Presidential election but formed the new party after his return in 1995.

The right-wing United Liberal Democrats was led by former Prime Minister of South Korea Kim Jong-pil, a former ally of President Kim. He had been a member of the former ruling Democratic Liberal Party but broke with it after Kim's victory in 1992. It joined with Kim Dae Jung's opposition and formed coalition.

The United Democratic Party had once been the premier opposition party. It supported Kim Dae-jung's unsuccessful Presidential campaign in 1992 and was the largest opposition party in the outgoing National Assembly. However, following the defection of Kim and his supporters, the party was reduced to a minor force. It later merged to Kim Young-sam's party.

== Results ==
Graph of the party split among 299 seats.
Party	Votes	%	Seats			
Party	Votes	%	FPTP	PR	Total	+/–
New Korea Party	6,783,730	34.52	121	18	139	–10
National Congress for New Politics	4,971,961	25.30	66	13	79	New
United Liberal Democrats	3,178,474	16.17	41	9	50	+18
United Democratic Party	2,207,695	11.23	9	6	15	–82
Unified People of Non-faction Party	177,050	0.90	0	0	0	New
Great Korean Democratic Party	3,114	0.02	0	0	0	New
21st Century Korean Independence Party	1,693	0.01	0	0	0	New
Chinmin Party	571	0.00	0	0	0	New
Independents	2,328,785	11.85	16	0	16	–5
Total	19,653,073	100.00	253	46	299	0
Valid votes	19,653,073	97.67				
Invalid/blank votes	469,726	2.33				
Total votes	20,122,799	100.00				
Registered voters/turnout	31,488,294	63.91				
Source: Nohlen et al.

=== By city/province ===
Results by city/provinces
Region	NKP		NCNP		ULD		UDP		Ind.		Total seats
Region	Seats	%	Seats	%	Seats	%	Seats	%	Seats	%	Total seats
Seoul	27	36.5	18	35.2	0	11.3	1	13.5	1	3.1	47
Busan	21	55.8	0	6.4	0	5.5	0	18.8	0	11.7	21
Daegu	2	24.5	0	1.4	8	35.8	0	4.0	3	11.7	13
Incheon	9	38.2	2	29.5	0	14.5	0	11.0	0	5.9	11
Gwangju	0	7.5	6	86.2	0	0.8	0	2.0	0	3.4	6
Daejeon	0	21.4	0	11.4	7	49.8	0	12.6	0	4.1	7
Gyeonggi	18	33.2	10	27.4	5	18.6	3	13.9	2	6.6	38
Gangwon	9	37.3	0	6.7	2	23.6	2	14.5	0	17.7	13
North Chungcheong	2	31.5	0	8.9	5	39.4	0	8.9	1	10.9	8
South Chungcheong	1	28.9	0	6.1	12	51.2	0	7.9	0	5.5	13
North Jeolla	1	23.4	13	63.7	0	0.5	0	5.8	0	5.7	14
South Jeolla	0	17.7	17	71.0	0	0.8	0	1.3	0	9.3	17
North Gyeongsang	11	34.9	0	1.6	2	20.6	1	6.9	5	33.3	19
South Gyeongsang	17	46.5	0	4.2	0	4.7	2	14.7	4	18.7	23
Jeju	3	37.2	0	29.4	0	1.2	0	2.0	0	30.2	3
Constituency total	121	34.5	66	25.3	41	16.2	9	11.2	16	11.8	253
PR seats	18		13		9		6		–		46
Total seats	139		79		50		15		16		299
