= Lee Ki-taek =

Lee Ki-taek may refer to:

- Lee Ki-taek (politician)
- Lee Ki-taek (actor)
