= 1992 South Korean legislative election =

- 24 March 1992

All 299 seats in the National Assembly 150 seats needed for a majority
- Turnout: 71.86% (▼3.91pp)
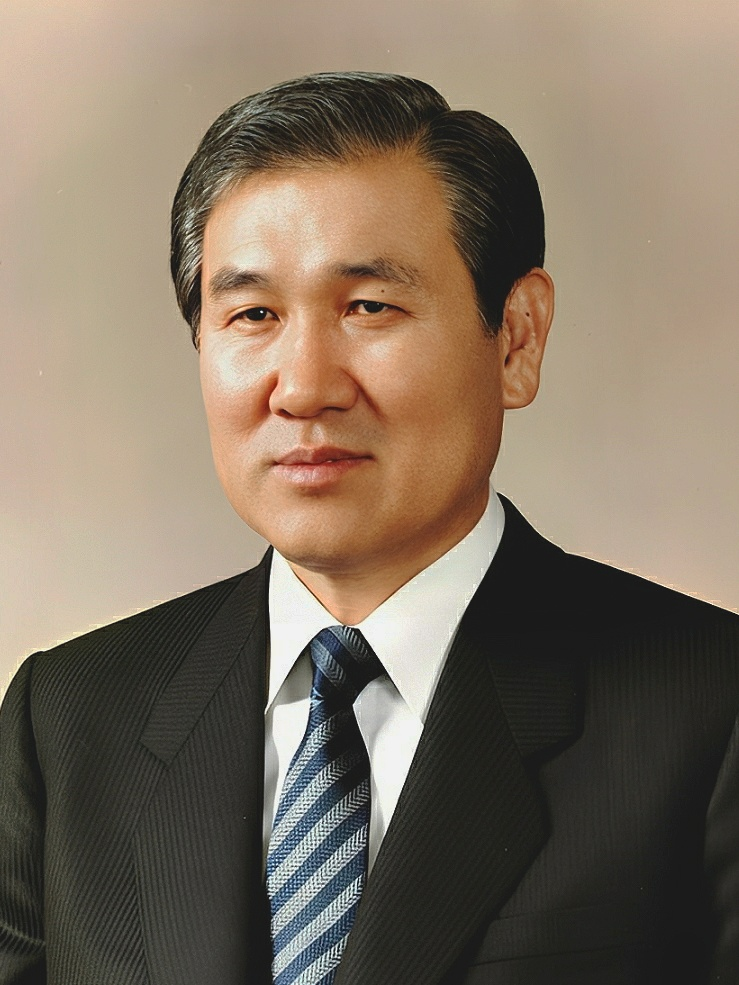

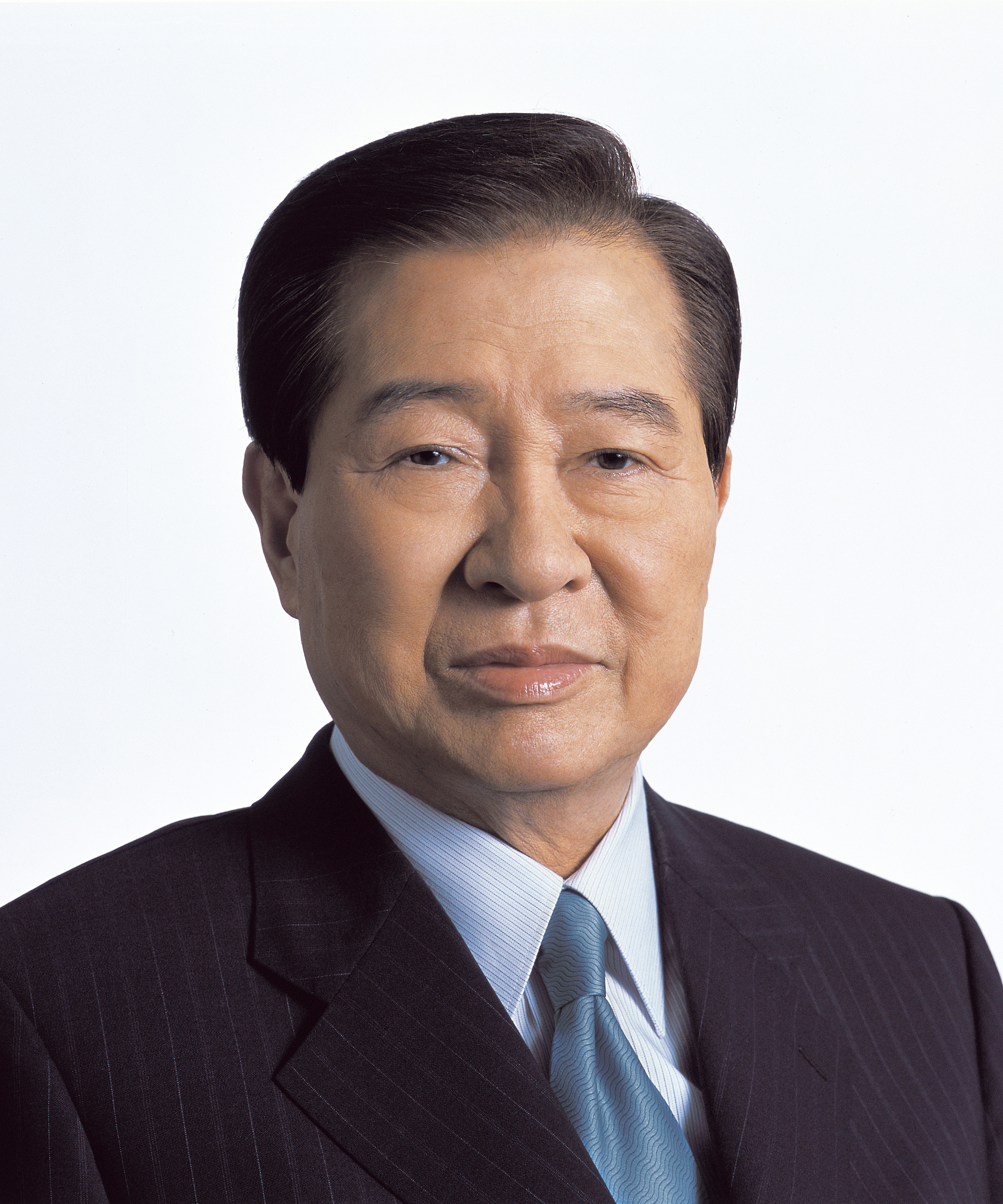

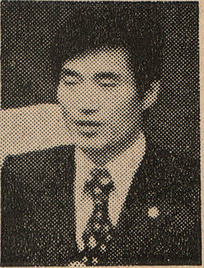

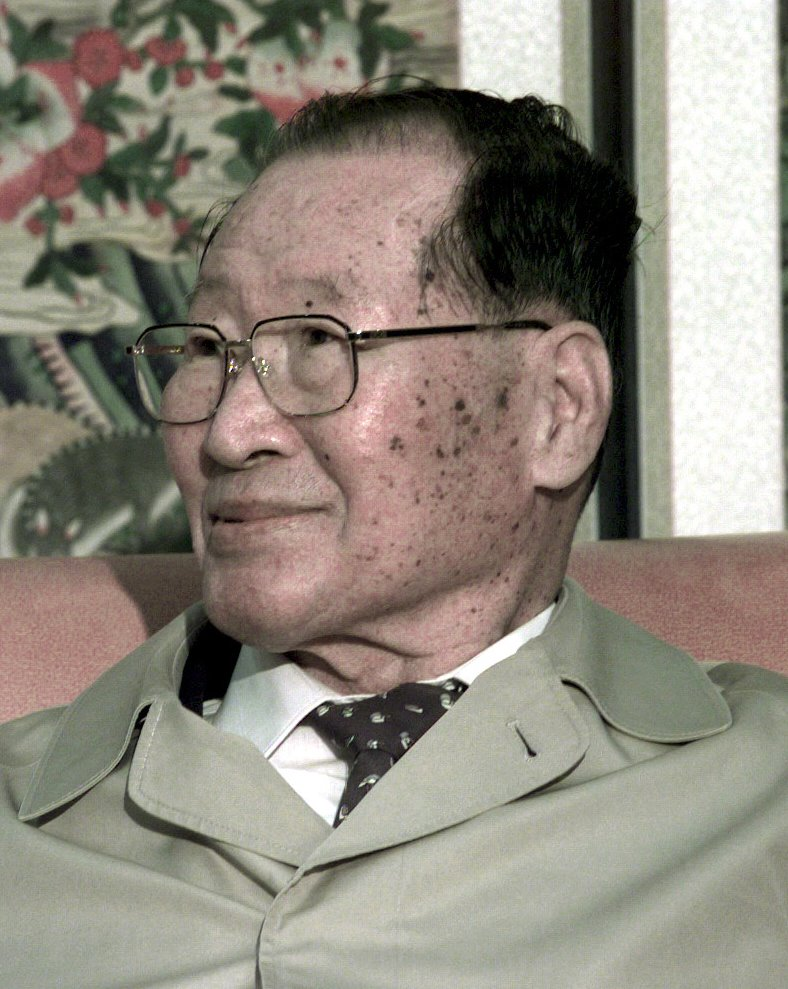
	Majority party	Minority party	Third party
Leader	Roh Tae-woo	Kim Dae-jung; Lee Ki-taek	Chung Ju-yung
Party	Democratic Liberal	Democratic	Unification National
Last election	219 seats (Note: Democratic Justice Party, Reunification Democratic Party and New Democratic Republican Party)	70 seats (Note: as Peace Democratic Party)	Did not exist
Seats won	149	97	31
Seat change	▼70	▲27	New
Popular vote	7,923,718	6,004,578	3,574,419
Percentage	38.49%	29.17%	17.37%
Swing	▼34.89pp	▲9.91pp	New
- Results of the election.
Speaker before election
Park Jyun-kyu
Democratic Liberal
Elected Speaker
Park Jyun-kyu
Democratic Liberal

Legislative elections were held in South Korea on 25 March 1992. The result was a victory for the Democratic Liberal Party, which won 149 of the 299 seats in the National Assembly. However, DLP's seats shortened from 218 to 149 seats, less than 150 needed for majority, so this regarded as retreat. Voter turnout was 72%.

== Electoral system ==
Of the 299 seats, 237 were elected in single-member districts via first-past-the-post voting, while the remainder were allocated via modified proportional representation at the national level among parties that won seven or more seats in constituencies based on the number of constituency seats won.

== Political parties ==
Parties	Leader	Ideology	Seats		Status
Parties	Leader	Ideology	Last election	Before election	Status
Democratic Liberal Party	Roh Tae-woo	Conservatism	125 / 276 (Note: Democratic Justice Party)	194 / 276	Government
Democratic Liberal Party	Roh Tae-woo	Conservatism	59 / 276 (Note: Reunification Democratic Party)	194 / 276	Government
Democratic Liberal Party	Roh Tae-woo	Conservatism	35 / 276 (Note: New Democratic Republican Party)	194 / 276	Government
Democratic Party	Park Young-sook	Liberalism	70 / 276 (Note: as Peace Democratic Party)	64 / 276	Opposition
Hankyoreh Democratic Party	Ye Chun-ho	Progressivism	1 / 276	Dissolved	Opposition
Unification National Party	Chung Ju-yung	Conservatism	Did not exist	7 / 276	Opposition
New Political Reform Party	Park Chan-jong	Conservatism	Did not exist	4 / 276	Opposition

The ruling Democratic Liberal Party was formed in 1990 through the merger of the former ruling Democratic Justice Party along with two opposition parties, the Reunification Democratic Party (RDP) and the New Democratic Republican Party (NDRP). The merger resulted in DLP having a congressional supermajority of 218 seats, which was more than 2/3 of whole seats. The party supported President Roh Tae-woo and included among its members former opposition leader Kim Young-sam and former Prime Minister Kim Jong-pil.

The leading opposition party was the Democratic Party. It was formed in 1991 through the merger of the New Democratic Allied Party (called Peace Democratic Party in previous election) led by Kim Dae-jung and former members of the RDP with the minor Democratic Party. The party was co-led by Kim and Lee Ki-taek. DP won 97 seats, which was less than 100 seats, one third of the whole seats, needed to prevent DLP's attempt to revise the constitution.

The Unification National Party was a conservative, centrist, developmentalist, pro-business party led by Hyundai founder Chung Ju-yung. The party campaigned heavily on the issue of the economy and the poor record of President Roh's government. The RNP won 31 seats, which was more than 10% of the seats, with 17.4% of popular vote, and joined the opposition.

These major three parties competed in presidential elections on 19 December, which ended with DLP nominee Kim Young-sam's victory.

== Results ==
Graph of the party split among 299 seats.
Party	Votes	%	Seats			
Party	Votes	%	FPTP	PR	Total	+/–
Democratic Liberal Party	7,923,719	38.49	116	33	149	–70
Democratic Party	6,004,577	29.17	75	22	97	+27
Unification National Party	3,574,419	17.37	24	7	31	New
New Political Reform Party	369,044	1.79	1	0	1	New
Popular Party	319,041	1.55	0	0	0	New
Fairness People's Party	21,007	0.10	0	0	0	New
Independents	2,372,005	11.52	21	0	21	+12
Total	20,583,812	100.00	237	62	299	0
Valid votes	20,583,812	98.75				
Invalid/blank votes	259,670	1.25				
Total votes	20,843,482	100.00				
Registered voters/turnout	29,003,828	71.86				
Source: Nohlen et al.

=== By city/province ===
Results by city/provinces
Region	DLP		DP		UNP		NPRP		Ind.		Total seats
Region	Seats	%	Seats	%	Seats	%	Seats	%	Seats	%	Total seats
Seoul	16	34.8	25	37.2	2	19.1	1	2.8	0	4.2	44
Busan	15	51.8	0	19.4	0	10.2	0	1.3	1	15.2	16
Daegu	8	46.9	0	11.8	2	28.6	0	3.0	1	8.8	11
Incheon	5	34.3	1	30.7	0	20.4	0	1.5	1	7.5	7
Gwangju	0	9.1	6	76.4	0	3.9	–		0	9.1	6
Daejeon	1	27.6	2	25.5	0	21.3	0	1.3	2	23.8	5
Gyeonggi	18	37.1	8	31.8	5	19.6	0	1.6	0	7.8	31
Gangwon	8	38.8	0	11.7	4	31.9	0	1.3	2	14.0	14
North Chungcheong	6	44.6	1	23.8	2	21.5	0	2.6	0	6.5	9
South Chungcheong	7	43.4	1	20.1	4	16.0	0	3.0	2	17.5	14
North Jeolla	2	31.8	12	55.0	0	4.8	0	0.6	0	7.1	14
South Jeolla	0	25.2	19	61.6	0	5.0	0	0.7	0	7.4	19
North Gyeongsang	14	49.0	0	6.8	2	17.7	0	0.7	5	24.0	21
South Gyeongsang	16	45.6	0	8.7	3	20.4	0	1.1	5	22.6	23
Jeju	0	34.1	0	19.9	–		–		3	46.0	3
Constituency total	116	38.5	75	29.2	24	17.4	1	1.7	21	11.6	237
PR seats	33		22		7		0		–		62
Total seats	149		97		31		1		21		299
