= Kim Dong-gil =

South Korean politician (1928–2022)

Member of the National Assembly of South Korea
- In office 30 May 1992 – 29 May 1996
- Preceded by: Hwang Byeong-tae; Lee Tae-seop
- Succeeded by: Seo Sang-mok; Hong Sa-deok
- Constituency: Gangnam A (constituency)

Personal details
- Born: 2 October 1928 Maengsan County, Korea, Empire of Japan
- Died: 4 October 2022 (aged 94) Seodaemun District, South Korea
- Party: Unification National Party; United Liberal Democrats
- Education: Yonsei University; Boston University
- Occupation: Poet

Kim Dong-gil (Korean: 김동길; 2 October 1928 – 4 October 2022) was a South Korean poet and politician. A member of the Unification National Party and later the United Liberal Democrats, he served in the National Assembly from 1992 to 1996.

Kim died in Seodaemun District on 4 October 2022, at the age of 94 from post COVID-19 complications.
