= Song Young-jin =

South Korean politician (1947–2022)

Member of the National Assembly of South Korea
- In office 30 May 2000 – 29 May 2004
- Preceded by: Kim Hyun-wook
- Succeeded by: Kim Nak-seong
- Constituency: Dangjin-gun
- In office 30 May 1992 – 29 May 1996
- Preceded by: Kim Hyun-wook
- Succeeded by: Kim Hyun-wook
- Constituency: Danjin-gun

Personal details
- Born: 16 August 1947 Dangjin, United States-occupied Korea
- Died: 16 December 2022 (aged 75)
- Party: Unification National Party; DP

Song Young-jin (Korean: 송영진; 16 August 1947 – 16 December 2022) was a South Korean politician. A member of the Unification National Party and later the Democratic Party, he served in the National Assembly from 1992 to 1996 and again from 2000 to 2004.

Song died on 16 December 2022, at the age of 75.
