= New Reform Party (South Korea, 1995) =

1995 political party in South Korea

- Leader: Hong Sung-woo
- Founded: November 29, 1995
- Dissolved: December 21, 1995
- Split from: Democratic Party; Popular Party; Progressive Political Alliance
- Merged into: United Democratic Party
- Ideology: Liberalism
- Political position: Centre-left
- Colors: Turquoise
- National Assembly: 0 / 299
- Metropolitan Mayors and Governors: 0 / 16
- Municipal Mayors: 0 / 234
- Provincial and Metropolitan Councillors: 0 / 933
- Municipal Councillors: 0 / 3,034

Korean name
- Hangul: 개혁신당
- Hanja: 改革新党
- RR: Gaehyeok sindang
- MR: Kaehyŏk sindang

The New Reform Party (Korean: 개혁신당) was a liberal party founded in 1995. The party was led by Hong Sung-woo and Chang Eul-byung, and modelled after the Reunification Democratic Party. It ceased to exist after merging with the Democratic Party to form the United Democratic Party.

== List of presidents ==
No.	President	Position	Term
1	Chang Eul-byung	President	29 November 1995 – 21 December 1995
1	Hong Sung-woo	President	29 November 1995 – 21 December 1995

== See also ==
- Reunification Democratic Party
- Democratic Party (South Korea, 1991)
- Democratic Party (South Korea, 1995)
- Popular Party
- Progressive Political Alliance
