= Kim Jae-soon =

South Korean politician

Kim Jae-soon (Korean: 김채순; November 30, 1923 – May 17, 2016) was a South Korean politician who served as the Speaker of the National Assembly from 1988 until 1990.

== Early life and career ==
Kim Jae-soon was born in 1923 in Pyongyang in Japanese-ruled Korea.

He was first elected to the National Assembly of South Korea in 1960. Kim, who represented Cheorwon and Hwacheon in Gangwon Province, was elected to the National Assembly in seven consecutive elections. He served as the Speaker of the National Assembly from 1988 to 1990. He retired from the National Assembly, and politics, in 1993. He later worked as an advisor and consultant to "Samtoh," a monthly magazine featuring collections of essays.

== Death ==
Kim Jae-soon died from natural causes on May 17, 2016, at the age of 93.
