= Lee Ki-taek (politician) =

South Korean politician (1937–2016)

- 이기택
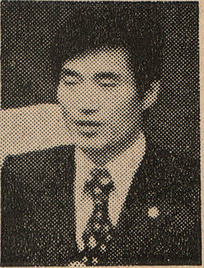
- Lee Ki-taek in October 1974

Chairman of Grand National Party (Acting)
- In office 5 August 1998 – 30 August 1998
- Preceded by: Cho Soon
- Succeeded by: Lee Hoi-chang

Chairman of United Democratic Party
- In office 4 June 1996 – 10 September 1997
- Preceded by: Park Il; Chang Eul-byung
- Succeeded by: Cho Soon

President of Democratic Party
- In office 16 September 1991 – 28 August 1995 serving with Kim Dae-jung until 18 December 1992
- Preceded by: Position established
- Succeeded by: Hong Young-ki; Park Il

Chairman of Democratic Party
- In office 3 February 1991 – 16 September 1991
- Preceded by: Kim Hyun-kyu acting
- Succeeded by: Position abolished
- In office 15 June 1990 – 16 November 1990
- Preceded by: Position established
- Succeeded by: Kim Hyun-kyu acting

Member of the National Assembly
- In office 30 May 1992 – 29 May 1996
- Constituency: Proportional
- In office 30 May 1988 – 29 May 1992
- Preceded by: Himself (along with Yoo Heung-soo, as South & Haeundae)
- Succeeded by: Kim Woon-hwan
- Constituency: Haeundae District
- In office 11 April 1985 – 29 May 1988 serving with Yoo Heung-soo
- Preceded by: Lee Heung-soo; Kim Seung-mok
- Succeeded by: Heo Jae-hong (South 1st); Chung Sang-koo (South 2nd); Himself (South 3rd)
- Constituency: South & Haeundae District
- In office 12 March 1973 – 27 December 1980 serving with Yang Chan-woo
- Preceded by: Yang Chan-woo (1st); Himself (2nd)
- Succeeded by: Park Kwan-yong; Kim Jin-jae
- Constituency: Dongnae District
- In office 1 July 1971 – 27 October 1972
- Preceded by: Lim Kap-soo
- Succeeded by: Yang Chan-woo; Himself
- Constituency: Dongnae District 2nd
- In office 1 July 1967 – 30 June 1971
- Constituency: Proportional

Personal details
- Born: 25 July 1937 Youngil County, Keishōhoku Province, Korea, Empire of Japan
- Died: 20 February 2016 (aged 78) St. Mary's Hospital, Seoul, South Korea
- Citizenship: South Korean
- Party: New Democratic Party (1967–1980); New Korea and Democratic Party (1985–1987); United Democratic Party (1987–1990); Democratic Party (L) (1990–1991); Democratic Party (1991–1995); United Democratic Party (1995–1997); Grand National Party (1997–2000;2007–2012); Democratic National Party (2000); Saenuri Party (2012–2016)
- Spouse: Lee Kyung-ui
- Children: Lee Sung-ho; Lee Woo-in; Lee Ji-in; Lee Se-in
- Education: Korea University
- Occupation: Politician

Lee Ki-taek (Korean: 이기택; 25 July 1937 – 20 February 2016) was a South Korean politician and parliamentarian.

Started as a youth politician of New Democratic Party in 1967, he served as the Chairman of Democratic Party, a splinter group of United Democratic Party known as "Little Democrats", from 1990 to 1991, and also as a co-president of newly formed Democratic Party along with Kim Dae-jung from 1991 to 1992, and solely from 1992 to 1995. He also served as the chairman for United Democratic Party from 1996 to 1997, and temporarily for Grand National Party in 1998. He was also a long-term Member of the National Assembly between the period of 1967 to 1996.

== Early life ==
Lee Ki-taek was born in Youngil County, Keishōhoku Province, Korea, Empire of Japan (now in Pohang, South Korea) on 25 July 1937. He had to move to Busan with his family in 1950 due to the Korean War. He was educated at Busan Commercial High School (now Kaesong High School), and earned a bachelor's degree in commerce, and also a master's degree in business administration from Korea University, where he used to be the President of Student Council and led a protest against election fraud of the President Syngman Rhee and his Freedom Party, which occurred the fall of the government. In 1961, he became the Division Chief in South Gyeongsang Province of Democratic Youth Committee.

== Political career ==
=== Early years ===
Prior to the 1967 election, Lee was brought to New Democratic Party (NDP) by its chairman, Yoo Jin-oh. He then ran 14th in the NDP list and elected as the youngest MP in South Korean history. He formed Pan-Youth Resistance Committee within the party, and led a protest against constitutional amendment proposed by Park Chung Hee, President of the Republic, and his ruling Democratic Republican Party. (Note: Park Chung Hee and Democratic Republican Party proposed a constitutional amendment, which allows the maximum 3 terms of the President (originally only up to 2 terms).) In 1971 election, he switched to Dongnae District 2nd constituency (also known as Busan 3rd constituency) and won. He was continuously elected to newly formed Dongnae District constituency in 1973 and 1978 election.

Lee was also a critic for Kim Young-sam, who was elected as the party's Chairman in 1974. He endorsed Lee Cheol-seung (CS) in 1976 leadership election, and CS could be elected as the new President of NDP, defeating Kim. Lee was then appointed as secretary-general by CS, but soon after, both were estranged from each other.

Lee ran for the chairmanship in 1979 leadership election. He received 17.8%, came to 3rd behind of Lee Cheol-seung and Kim Young-sam, and was eliminated from the 1st round. In the 2nd round, he endorsed Kim, who narrowly beat CS. Kim then appointed Lee as deputy chairman, which made him as the youngest person to hold the position in South Korea.

=== 1980s ===
Lee was banned from politics by New Military of Chun Doo-hwan in 1980, therefore unable to run in 1981 election. His constituency was then taken over by Park Kwan-yong, Lee's secretary, and Kim Jin-jae. He then moved to the United States and worked as a visiting professor in University of Pennsylvania.

After his political ban was lifted in 1984, Lee subsequently joined New Korea and Democratic Party (NKDP), along with Kim Young-sam and Kim Dae-jung. Originally, he was intended to run for Dongnae District, where he used to be an MP of, in 1985 election. However, the constituency was already taken over by Park Kwan-young, who was elected under the banner of Democratic Korea Party in 1981 and switched to NKDP in 1984. He then decided to run for Haeundae and South District constituency, and successfully returned as MP.

Lee served as Deputy Chairman under Lee Min-woo, who was elected for the chairmanship in 1985 leadership election. Soon, the party faced an internal conflicts, after Lee Min-woo announced his own plan (known as "Lee Min-woo Plan") that supported parliamentary system. This was strongly objected by Kim Young-sam (YS) and Kim Dae-jung (DJ), who advocated to maintain the incumbent presidential system but sought for direct election of the President. Both YS, DJ, and their followers left NKDP and founded United Democratic Party (UDP) on 21 April 1987. Lee was also one of them, but did not join UDP till the 29 June Declaration.

In 1988 election, Lee ran for Haeundae District and re-elected. He served as the Deputy Chairman of UDP from 1987 to 1989, and also the parliamentary leader, replacing Seo Seok-jae, in 1989. He was also the President of Special Investigative Committee established to investigate the corruptions regarding with the ruling Democratic Justice Party.

=== 1990s ===
On 22 January 1990, Kim Young-sam (YS), Chairman of UDP, declared to the party's merger with Democratic Justice Party and New Democratic Republican Party, in order to form Democratic Liberal Party (DLP). Lee, who led the party's dissidents, refused to join and formed Democratic Party, commonly known as "Little Democrats". He subsequently became the party's Chairman, but then decided to merge with Kim Dae-jung (DJ)'s New Democratic Unionist Party (NDUP) after the serious defeat in 1991 local elections.

On 16 September 1991, both NDUP and Little Democrats was combined altogether and re-founded as Democratic Party. Both DJ and Lee was elected as co-presidents. In 1992 election, he switched to proportional and won as 2nd.

Prior to the presidential election in 1992, Lee ran for the presidential primary on 26 May, but defeated with a large margin to DJ. Nevertheless, DJ was widely criticised for his controversial remarks, which called rural voters as "pro-DLP", and/or "pro-Roh Tae-woo". DJ lost to YS, and declared his retirement from politics. Lee solely became the party's president, and was re-elected in 1993.

The Democratic Party then absorbed New Korea Party of Lee Jong-chan in the early 1995, and won the local elections in 1995. However, shortly after, DJ officially returned to politics, and conflicts were sparked. The party's pro-DJ factions, not excluding DJ himself, left and founded a new party, named National Congress for New Politics (NCNP). Lee, who was in charge of this incident, had to resign his presidency. His party, was re-built as United Democratic Party (UDP) on 21 December.

Lee ran for Haeundae & Gijang 1st constituency in 1996 election, but lost to the ruling New Korea Party (NKP)'s Kim Woon-hwan, which ended his MP career for almost 30 years. Shortly after the defeat, he was elected as the Chairman of UDP. He kept trying to return as MP, and in 1997 by-elections, he ran for North District of Pohang, where he was born, but defeated to Park Tae-joon, who soon became a crucial figure of Alliance of DJP. He resigned his chairmanship on 11 September, and was replaced by Cho Soon, ex-Mayor of Seoul.

Under the leadership of Cho, UDP decided to merge with the ruling NKP, in order to overcome its minority position. Both were merged into Grand National Party (GNP), and most of members including Lee automatically joined to the new party, despite some dissidents who refused to join e.g. Roh Moo-hyun. Cho then became the chairman of newly formed GNP. Since GNP was de facto the ruling party, this was the first time that Lee became a ruling politician. (Note: President Kim Young-sam was expelled from NKP before the formation of GNP, therefore GNP was de jure an opposition.) Nevertheless, GNP's presidential candidate, Lee Hoi-chang, lost to NCNP's Kim Dae-jung, and Lee became again as an opposition politician.

After GNP lost to Alliance of DJP in 1998 local elections, Cho resigned his chairmanship. Lee was the acting chairman, till Lee Hoi-chang was newly elected.

=== 2000s and after ===
Prior to 2000 election, GNP faced a conflicts regarding with preselections. The party's dissidents, including Lee, left and established Democratic National Party (DNP). He was preselected as MP candidate for Yeonje District, but lost to GNP's Kwon Tae-mang.

During the presidential election in 2002, he supported Roh Moo-hyun, the presidential candidate of Millennium Democratic Party. Roh was then elected as the President of the Republic, but Lee subsequently declined his endorsement towards Roh due to the ideological conflicts. He did not run as MP from 2004 election.

In 2007 presidential election, Lee Ki-taek endorsed GNP's candidate Lee Myung-bak (MB). He then re-joined GNP, and was appointed to National Unification Advisory Council on 1 September 2008. After that, he was also involved in various organisations.

== Death and legacy ==
Lee died on 20 February 2016, in St. Mary's Hospital of Seoul, aged 78. The day before he died, he completed his reminiscences named The Way of a Cow (우행). This was released on 15 September 2017.

Several politicians put comments regarding with him.

He always acted if he needed a belief and impetuousness.

— Chung Se-kyun, former Speaker of the National Assembly (2016–2018)

His leadership was represented as gentleness. The "leadership of listening", which broke the stubbornness but also fulfilled the willingness, was absolutely impressive.

— Moon Hee-sang, Speaker of the National Assembly (2018-)

He led a student movement, which led to the April Revolution. I, as one of his juniors, can now learn the history of South Korean politics deeper by reading his reminiscences.

— Park Won-soon, Mayor of Seoul (2011-)

== Personal life ==
Lee Ki-taek married to Lee Kyung-ui, and had a son (Lee Sung-ho) and 3 daughters ― Lee Woo-in, Lee Ji-in, and Lee Se-in.

Lee's other family members were also key members of Taekwang Industry.

== Election results ==
Year	Constituency	Political party	Votes (%)	Remarks
1967	Proportional (14th)	NDP	3,554,224 (32.70%)	Won
1971	Dongnae (2nd)	NDP	34,471 (65.89%)	Won
1973	Dongnae	NDP	57,757 (39.23%)	Won
1978	Dongnae	NDP	117,216 (40.14%)	Won
1985	South & Haeundae	NKDP	159,127 (43.00%)	Won
1988	Haeundae	UDP	54,223 (58.30%)	Won
1992	Proportional (2nd)	Democratic	6,004,578 (29.20%)	Won
1996	Haeundae & Gijang	UDP	55,163 (47.65%)	Lost
1997	Pohang North	UDP	35,137 (28.33%)	Lost
2000	Yeonje	DNP	26,060 (26.53%)	Lost
