= 1992 South Korean presidential election =

- 18 December 1992
- Registered: 29,422,658
- Turnout: 81.89% (▼7.26pp)
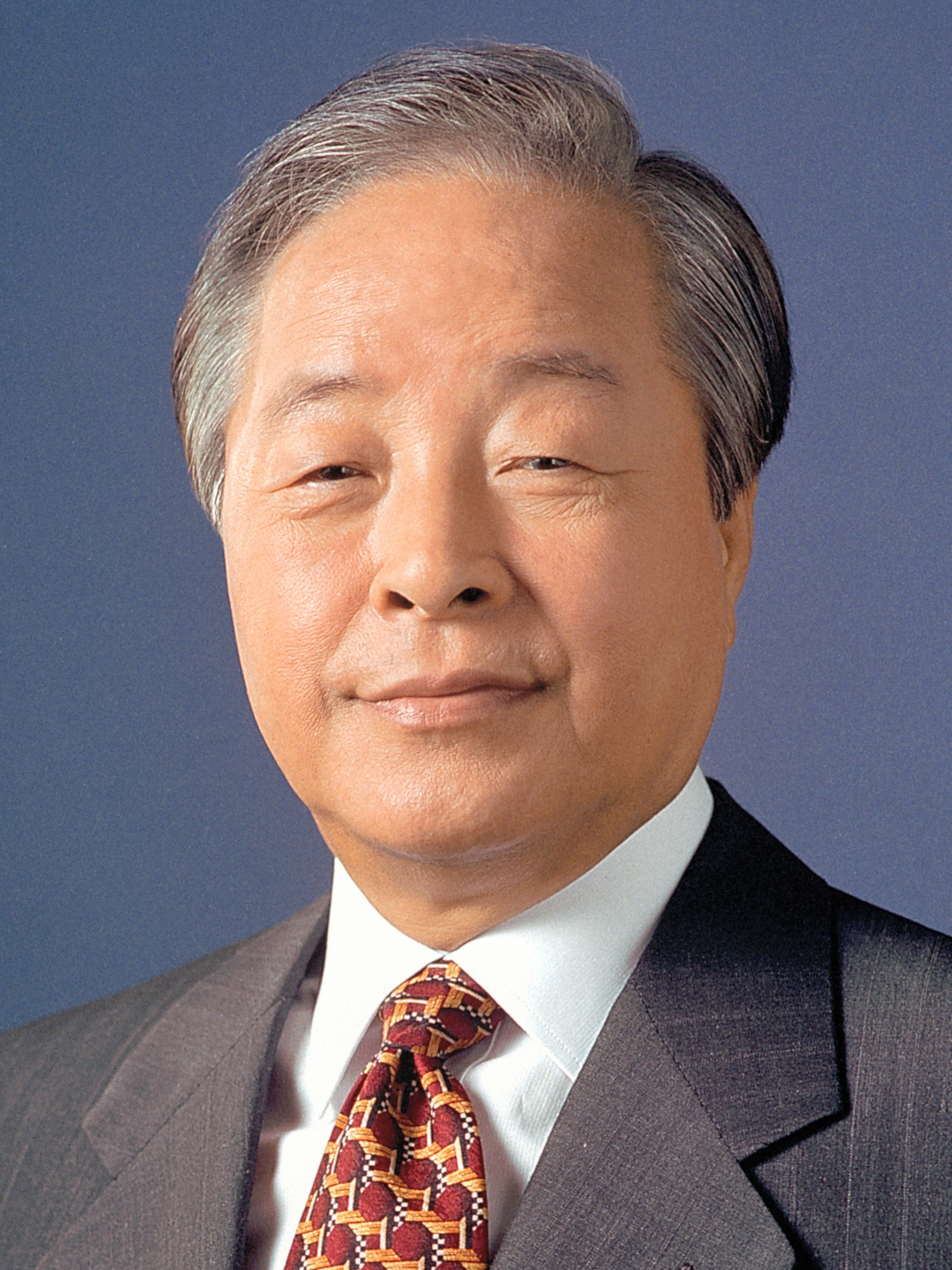

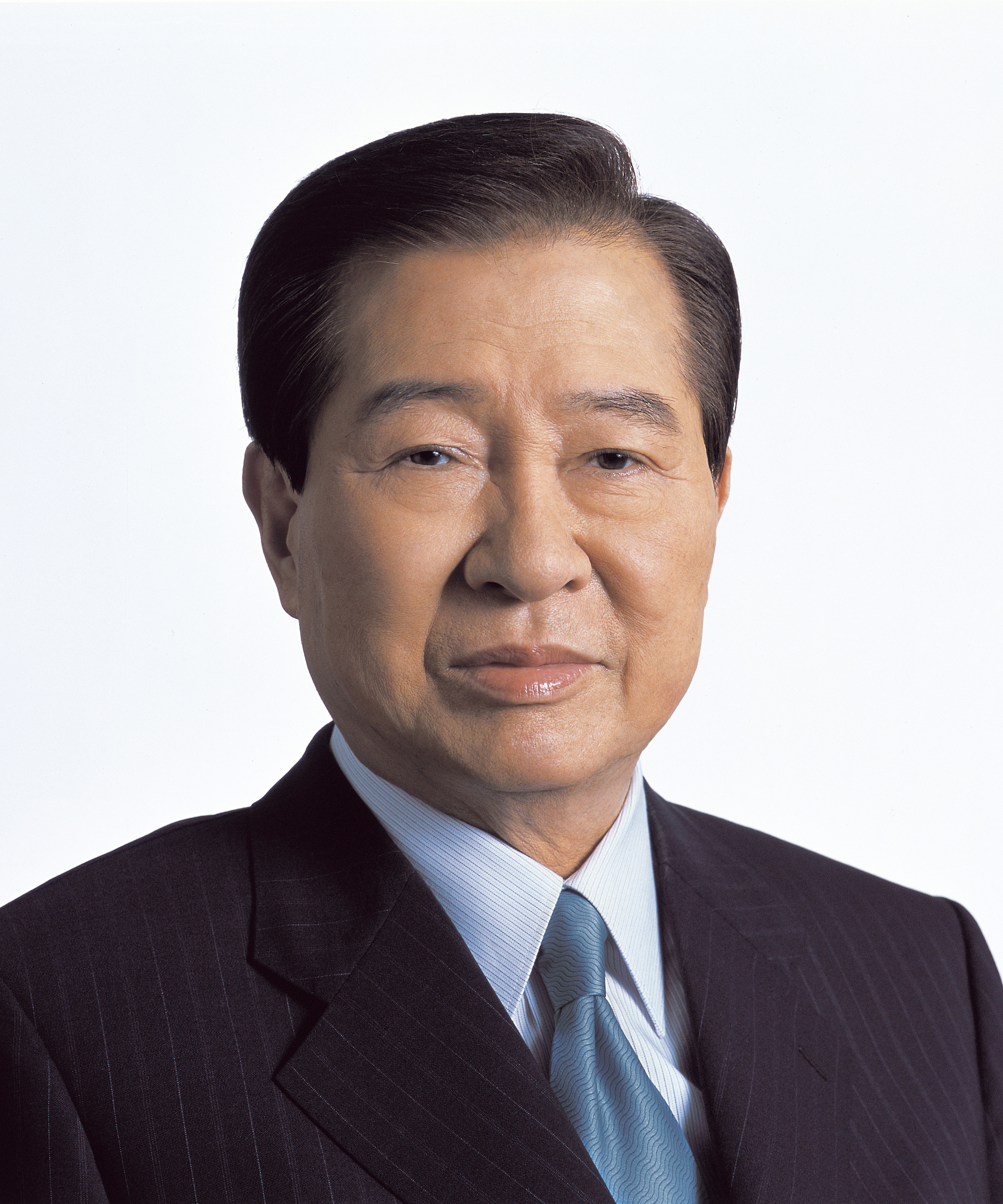

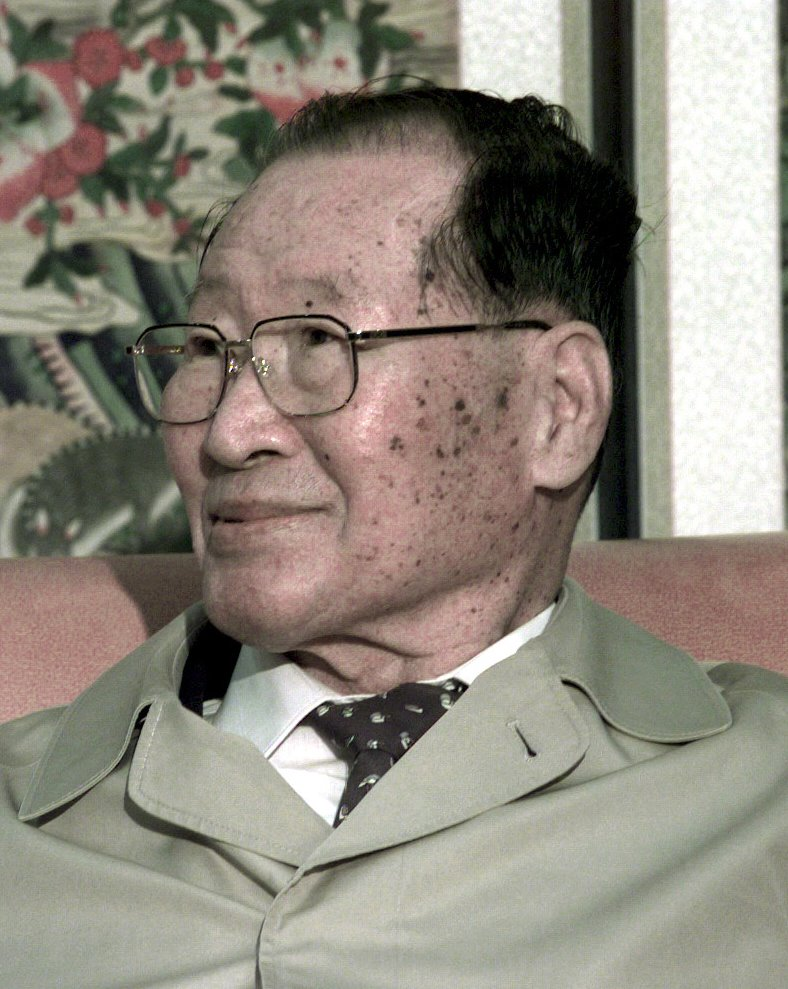

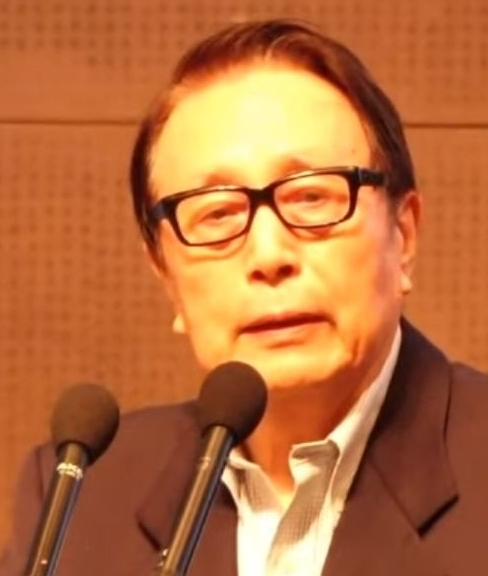
| Nominee | Kim Young-sam | Kim Dae-jung |
| Party | Democratic Liberal | Democratic |
| Popular vote | 9,977,332 | 8,041,284 |
| Percentage | 41.96% | 33.82% |
| Nominee | Chung Ju-yung | Park Chan-jong |
| Party | Unification National | New Political Reform |
| Popular vote | 3,880,067 | 1,516,047 |
| Percentage | 16.32% | 6.38% |
President before election
Roh Tae-woo
Independent
Elected President
Kim Young-sam
Democratic Liberal

Presidential elections were held in South Korea on 18 December 1992, the second democratic presidential elections since the end of military rule in 1987. Voter turnout was 81.9%.

In the first regular presidential election with no military candidates since 1960, Kim Young-sam of the ruling Democratic Liberal Party won with 42 percent of the vote.

== Background ==
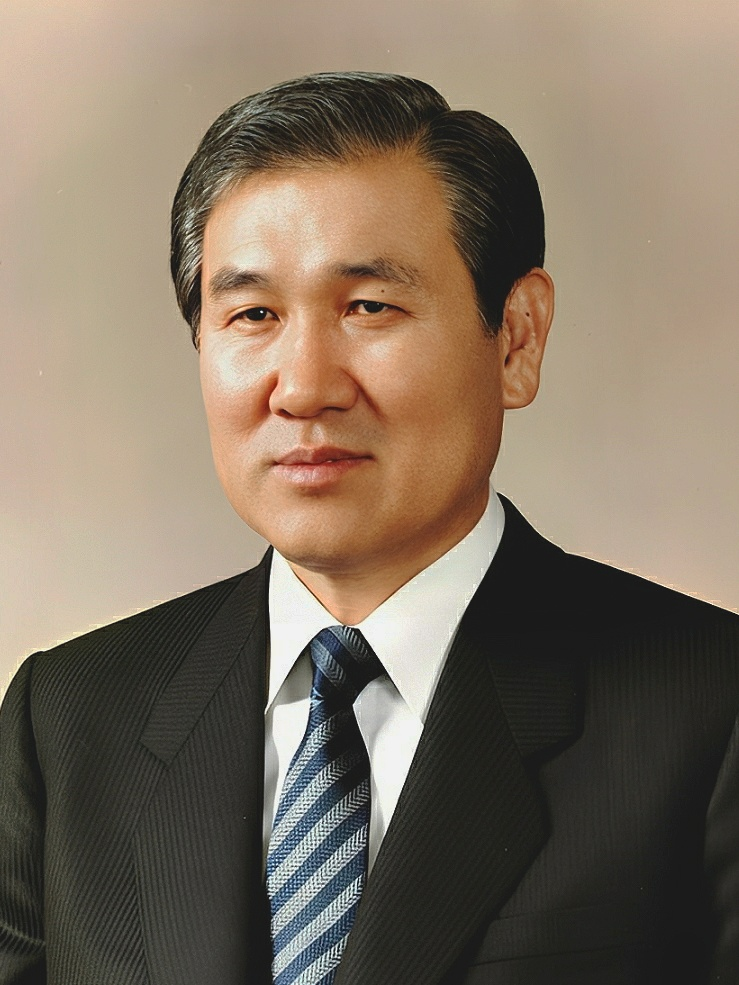
The incumbent in 1992, Roh Tae-woo. His term expired on 25 February 1993.

On 22 January 1990 two opposition leaders Kim Young-sam and Kim Jong-pil merged their parties into the ruling party Democratic Justice Party to form the Democratic Liberal Party, led by President Roh Tae-woo. Before they merged, Roh's party did not have a majority in the National Assembly. After they merged, they had over a two-thirds majority, which could pass bills without any obstruction from the opposition. Roh could not run for re-election due to the constitution limiting the president to a single five-year term.

Kim Dae-jung, an opponent in the 1987 election who finished third behind Kim Young-sam and Roh Tae-woo ran again in 1992. Hyundai businessman Chung Ju-yung also ran in the election.

== Nominations ==
=== Democratic Liberal Party ===
The Democratic Liberal Party national convention was held on 19 May at the Olympic Gymnastics Arena. Nine-term lawmaker from Busan Kim Young-sam won the nomination, defeating four-term lawmaker from Seoul Lee Jong-chan, who did not concede and ran as a third-party candidate. Lee Jong-chan withdrew his campaign and endorsed RNP nominee Chung Ju-yung in December.

| Candidate | Votes | % |
|---|---|---|
| Kim Young-sam | 4,418 | 66.62 |
| Lee Jong-chan | 2,214 | 33.38 |
| Total | 6,632 | 100.00 |
| Valid votes | 6,632 | 99.58 |
| Invalid/blank votes | 28 | 0.42 |
| Total votes | 6,660 | 100.00 |
| Registered voters/turnout | 6,882 | 96.77 |

=== Democratic Party ===
The Democratic National Convention was held from 25 to 26 May at the Olympic Fencing Gymnasium. At the convention, Kim Dae-jung, 6-term lawmaker from South Jeolla, defeated Lee Ki-taek, 7-term lawmaker from Busan, and won the nomination.

Of 2,426 delegates present at the convention, 1,443 had been from Kim's faction and only 983 from Lee's, so Kim was thought as the presumptive nominee even before the convention began.

| Candidate | Votes | % |
|---|---|---|
| Kim Dae-jung | 1,413 | 60.44 |
| Lee Ki-taek | 925 | 39.56 |
| Total | 2,338 | 100.00 |
| Valid votes | 2,338 | 99.15 |
| Invalid/blank votes | 20 | 0.85 |
| Total votes | 2,358 | 100.00 |

=== Unification National Party ===
At the UNP National Convention held on 15 May at the KOEX in Seoul, Chung Ju-yung was nominated for president by a yay-nay rising vote.

| Candidate | Votes | % |
|---|---|---|
| Chung Ju-yung | 1,727 | 99.60 |
| Against | 7 | 0.40 |
| Total | 1,734 | 100.00 |
| Valid votes | 1,734 | 100.00 |
| Invalid/blank votes | 0 | 0.00 |
| Total votes | 1,734 | 100.00 |
| Registered voters/turnout | 1,738 | 99.77 |

== Results ==
The right-wing conservative Democratic Liberal Party presidential candidate Kim Young-Sam won the presidential election, defeating opposition Democratic Party leader Kim Dae-Jung, marking the third time he had lost a presidential election. Kim later announced his retirement from politics.

The conservative ruling party won the election continued to govern until 1997 when Kim Dae-Jung won the next presidential election.

| Candidate | Party | Votes | % |
|---|---|---|---|
| Kim Young-sam | Democratic Liberal Party | 9,977,332 | 41.96 |
| Kim Dae-jung | Democratic Party | 8,041,284 | 33.82 |
| Chung Ju-yung | Unification National Party | 3,880,067 | 16.32 |
| Park Chan-jong | New Political Reform Party | 1,516,047 | 6.38 |
| Baek Gi-Wan | Independent | 238,648 | 1.00 |
| Kim Ok-sun | Independent | 86,292 | 0.36 |
| Lee Byeong-ho | Korean Justice Party | 35,739 | 0.15 |
| Total | | 23,775,409 | 100.00 |
| Valid votes | | 23,775,409 | 98.67 |
| Invalid/blank votes | | 319,761 | 1.33 |
| Total votes | | 24,095,170 | 100.00 |
| Registered voters/turnout | | 29,422,658 | 81.89 |
Source: Nohlen et al.

=== By province and city ===
| Province/City | Kim Young-sam | | Kim Dae-jung | | Chung Ju-yung | | Park Chan-jong | | Baek Gi-wan | | Kim Ok-sun | | Lee Byeong-ho | |
| Province/City | Votes | % | Votes | % | Votes | % | Votes | % | Votes | % | Votes | % | Votes | % |
|---|---|---|---|---|---|---|---|---|---|---|---|---|---|---|
| Seoul | 2,167,298 | 36.41 | 2,246,636 | 37.75 | 1,070,629 | 17.99 | 381,535 | 6.41 | 67,784 | 1.14 | 13,098 | 0.22 | 4,797 | 0.08 |
| Busan | 1,551,473 | 73.34 | 265,055 | 12.53 | 133,907 | 6.33 | 139,004 | 6.57 | 21,736 | 1.03 | 3,236 | 0.15 | 978 | 0.05 |
| Daegu | 690,245 | 59.60 | 90,641 | 7.83 | 224,642 | 19.40 | 136,037 | 11.75 | 12,772 | 1.10 | 2,753 | 0.24 | 1,103 | 0.10 |
| Incheon | 397,361 | 37.27 | 338,538 | 31.75 | 228,505 | 21.43 | 84,211 | 7.90 | 12,455 | 1.17 | 3,867 | 0.36 | 1,351 | 0.13 |
| Gwangju | 14,504 | 2.13 | 652,337 | 95.85 | 8,085 | 1.19 | 2,827 | 0.42 | 1,565 | 0.23 | 1,149 | 0.17 | 133 | 0.02 |
| Daejeon | 202,137 | 35.19 | 165,067 | 28.74 | 133,646 | 23.27 | 64,526 | 11.23 | 5,772 | 1.00 | 2,294 | 0.40 | 961 | 0.17 |
| Gyeonggi | 1,254,025 | 36.33 | 1,103,498 | 31.97 | 798,356 | 23.13 | 239,140 | 6.93 | 36,392 | 1.05 | 13,685 | 0.40 | 6,299 | 0.18 |
| Gangwon | 340,528 | 41.51 | 127,265 | 15.52 | 279,610 | 34.09 | 56,199 | 6.85 | 9,599 | 1.17 | 4,007 | 0.49 | 3,047 | 0.37 |
| North Chungcheong | 281,678 | 38.26 | 191,743 | 26.05 | 175,767 | 23.88 | 68,900 | 9.36 | 8,671 | 1.18 | 4,568 | 0.62 | 4,844 | 0.66 |
| South Chungcheong | 351,789 | 36.94 | 271,921 | 28.55 | 240,400 | 25.24 | 64,117 | 6.73 | 10,185 | 1.07 | 9,899 | 1.04 | 4,143 | 0.43 |
| North Jeolla | 63,175 | 5.68 | 991,483 | 89.13 | 35,923 | 3.23 | 9,320 | 0.84 | 4,232 | 0.38 | 7,130 | 0.64 | 1,087 | 0.10 |
| South Jeolla | 53,360 | 4.20 | 1,170,398 | 92.16 | 26,686 | 2.10 | 7,210 | 0.57 | 3,311 | 0.26 | 8,010 | 0.63 | 1,048 | 0.08 |
| North Gyeongsang | 991,424 | 64.73 | 147,440 | 9.63 | 240,646 | 15.71 | 124,858 | 8.15 | 17,664 | 1.15 | 6,240 | 0.41 | 3,365 | 0.22 |
| South Gyeongsang | 1,514,043 | 72.32 | 193,373 | 9.24 | 241,135 | 11.52 | 115,086 | 5.50 | 22,863 | 1.09 | 5,070 | 0.24 | 2,020 | 0.10 |
| Jeju | 104,292 | 39.98 | 85,889 | 32.92 | 42,130 | 16.15 | 23,077 | 8.85 | 3,647 | 1.40 | 1,286 | 0.49 | 563 | 0.22 |
| Total | 9,977,332 | 41.96 | 8,041,284 | 33.82 | 3,880,067 | 16.32 | 1,516,047 | 6.38 | 238,648 | 1.00 | 86,292 | 0.36 | 35,729 | 0.15 |
Source: National Election Committee
