= Democratic Party (South Korea, 1995) =

1995–1997 political party in South Korea

Democratic Party 통합민주당
- Abbreviation: DP
- Founded: December 21, 1995
- Dissolved: November 21, 1997
- Merger of: Democratic; New Reform
- Merged into: Grand National
- Succeeded by: National Congress for New Politics factions, including Roh Moo-hyun
- Ideology: Liberalism (South Korean); Centrist reformism
- Political position: Centre to centre-left
- Colours: Green

The Democratic Party (DP; Korean: 민주당; Hanja: 民主黨; RR: Minjudang) was a political party of South Korea from 1995 to 1997. Formerly named United Democratic Party (DP; 통합민주당; 統合民主黨; tonghamminjudang), it was renamed in 1996.

== History ==
The party was formed by the merger of Democratic Party and New Reform Party. Originally, Democratic Party won the local elections in 1995. However, shortly after, Kim Dae-jung (DJ), former Co-President of the party, officially returned to politics, and conflicts were sparked. The party's pro-DJ factions, not excluding DJ himself, left and founded a new party, named National Congress for New Politics (NCNP). The remained Democratic Party merged itself with a minor party named New Reform Party, and newly formed United Democratic Party on 21 December.

The party faced a huge defeat in 1996 election, due to the oppositions votes splits under the FPTP systems with few PRs. On 4 June 1996, shortly after the election defeat, the party held a leadership election, and elected Lee Ki-taek, former President of the Democratic Party, as its Chairman, and also removed "united" from its name. The party was kept declining due to some MPs joining the ruling New Korea Party (NKP).

In the leadership election on 11 September 1997, Cho Soon was elected as the new Chairman, and also the presidential candidate for upcoming presidential election. Shortly before the leadership election, Cho was the 3rd-most preferred President, according to an opinion polls. However, his popularity kept declining till 4.7%, made him almost unable to manage his campaign. After 2 main opposition parties ― National Congress for New Politics (NCNP), and United Liberal Democrats (ULD) had agreed to put a sole candidate named Kim Dae-jung of NCNP, the ruling NKP's Lee Hoi-chang was struggling with his low popularity. Both NKP and Democratic Party agreed to merge each other and put Lee as their sole candidate. Both were combined and re-founded as Grand National Party, but dissidents including Roh Moo-hyun disagreed with it and joined to NCNP.

== Party leadership ==
=== Chairmen ===
No.	President(s)	Period
1	Park Il; Chang Eul-byung	21 December 1995 – 3 June 1996
2	Lee Ki-taek	4 June 1996 – 10 September 1997
3	Cho Soon	11 September 1997 – 20 November 1997

== Election results ==
Election	Leader	Votes	%	Seats			Position	Status
Election	Leader	Votes	%	Constituency	Party list	Total	Position	Status
1996	Park Il; Chang Eul-byung	2,207,695	11.2	9 / 253	6 / 46	15 / 299	4th	Governing coalition
