= Democratic Party (South Korea, 1991) =

1991–1995 political party in South Korea

Democratic Party 민주당 民主黨
- Abbreviation: DP
- President: Kim Dae-jung (1991–1992); Lee Ki-taek
- Founded: 16 September 1991
- Dissolved: 21 December 1995
- Merger of: New United Democratic; Democratic; New Korea (1995)
- Merged into: United Democratic Party
- Succeeded by: National Congress for New Politics pro-Kim Dae-jung faction
- Ideology: Liberalism (South Korean); Centrist reformism
- Political position: Centre to centre-left
- Colours: Red; Green

The Democratic Party (Korean: 민주당; Hanja: 民主黨; RR: Minjudang; DP) was a political party of South Korea from 1991 to 1995.

== History ==
The party was formed by the merger of New Democratic Unionist Party (NDUP) of Kim Dae-jung, and Democratic Party of Lee Ki-taek (aka Little Democrats), as a part of the opposition union. During that time, NDUP, the main opposition, faced a difficulties after they lost in 1991 local elections. Little Democratic Party, a splinter group formed by the dissidents of Kim Young-sam's Reunification Democratic Party, was struggling with its few seats.

On 16 September 1991, both parties declared to be combined and re-founded as Democratic Party. Both Kim Dae-jung (DJ; Chairman of NDUP) and Lee Ki-taek (KT; Chairman of Little Democrats), was elected as the Co-Presidents of the new party.

Prior to the presidential election in 1992, DJ defeated Lee and elected as the party's presidential candidate. He was widely criticised for calling rural voters as "pro-Democratic Liberal Party (DLP; the then ruling party)" and/or "pro-Roh Tae-woo", and lost to DLP's Kim Young-sam. DJ subsequently resigned his party presidency and retired from the politics. KT then solely elected as the new president on 11 March 1993.

The party then absorbed New Korea Party of Lee Jong-chan in the early 1995, and won the local elections in 1995. However, shortly after, DJ officially returned to politics, and conflicts were sparked. The party's pro-DJ factions, not excluding DJ himself, left and founded a new party, named National Congress for New Politics (NCNP). On 21 December, the party merged with New Reform Party, and re-built as United Democratic Party, who then became one of the predecessor of the incumbent People Power Party.

== Leadership ==
=== Party Presidents ===
No.	President(s)	Period
1	Kim Dae-jung; Lee Ki-taek	16 September 1991 – 11 March 1993 (Note: Kim Dae-jung resigned on 18 December 1992 due to the election defeats.)
2	Lee Ki-taek	11 March 1993 – 28 August 1995
3	Hong Young-ki; Park Il	29 August 1995 – 14 December 1995

== Election results ==
=== President ===
Election	Candidate	Votes	%	Result
1992	Kim Dae-jung	8,041,284	29.17	Not elected

=== Legislature ===
Election	Leader	Votes	%	Seats			Position	Status
Election	Leader	Votes	%	Constituency	Party list	Total	Position	Status
1992	Kim Dae-jung; Lee Ki-taek	6,004,578	29.2	75 / 237	22 / 62	97 / 299	2nd	Opposition

=== Local ===
Election	Leader	Metropolitan mayor/Governor	Provincial legislature	Municipal mayor
1995	Lee Ki-taek	4 / 15	390 / 970	84 / 230
