= United Liberal Democrats =

1995–2006 political party in South Korea

United Liberal Democrats 자유민주연합
- Abbreviation: ULD
- Founder: Kim Jong-pil
- Founded: March 30, 1995
- Dissolved: April 7, 2006
- Merger of: New Democratic
- Split from: New Korea
- Headquarters: Seoul, South Korea
- Ideology: Conservatism (South Korean); Chungcheong regionalism
- Political position: Right-wing
- Colors: Green

Party flag

- United Liberal Democrats
- Hangul: 자유민주연합
- Hanja: 自由民主聯合
- Lit.: Liberal Democratic Union
- RR: Jayu minju yeonhap
- MR: Chayu minju yŏnhap

The United Liberal Democrats (ULD; Korean: 자유민주연합) was a right-wing conservative political party in South Korea, whose support mostly came from the North Chungcheong Province and South Chungcheong Province regions. The short Korean name is Jaminryeon (Korean: 자민련, lit. 'Liberal Union'; ULD).

The Party was in a government coalition with Kim Dae-jung's Democratic Party from 1998 to 2001.

In the 2004 parliamentary election, it gained only 4 seats in the National Assembly, and its president Kim Jong-pil announced his retirement from politics after his bid for a 10th term in the National Assembly failed. Subsequently, most lawmakers from the party chose to defect from the party to form a new party, People First Party.

== Election results ==
=== Legislature ===
Election	Leader	Constituency				Party list				Seats		Position	Status
Election	Leader	Votes	%	Seats	+/-	Votes	%	Seats	+/-	No.	+/–	Position	Status
1996	Kim Jong-pil	3,178,474	16.17	41 / 253	new			9 / 46	new	50 / 299	new	3rd	Governing coalition
2000	Lee Han-dong	1,859,331	9.84	12 / 227	▼29			5 / 46	▼4	17 / 273	▼33	3rd	Opposition
2004	Kim Jong-pil	569,083	2.67	4 / 243	▼8	600,462	2.82	0 / 56	▼5	4 / 299	▼13	5th	Opposition

=== Local ===
Election	Leader	Metropolitan mayor/Governor	Provincial legislature	Municipal mayor
1995	Kim Jong-pil	4 / 15	94 / 970	23 / 230
1998	Park Tae-joon	4 / 16	95 / 690	29 / 232
2002	Kim Jong-pil	1 / 16	33 / 682	16 / 227
