= Unification National Party =

1992–1994 political party in South Korea

Unification National Party 통일국민당
- Leader: Chung Ju-yung
- Founded: 3 January 1992
- Dissolved: 8 July 1994
- Merged into: New Democratic Party
- Ideology: Moderate conservatism
- Political position: Centre-right
- Colours: Green

Party flag

- Unification National Party
- Hangul: 통일국민당
- Hanja: 統一國民黨
- RR: Tongil gungmindang
- MR: T'ongil kungmindang

The Unification National Party (Korean: 통일국민당) was a political party which was founded in 1992 by Chung Ju-yung, founder of Hyundai Group.

== History ==
The party was founded in January 1992 ahead of the 1992 legislative election in March, for which Chung announced his candidacy. The use of the word "unification" in the party's name reflects a common theme in earlier South Korean politics to consider Korean reunification an important issue, something which has become less common today. Nonetheless, Chung and his party formed primarily in reaction to the government's strict attempts to regulate chaebol conglomerates and called for economic deregulation and liberalisation. The party also criticised the nascent Gyeongbu high-speed railway as a government fundraising project for the upcoming election. The party succeeded in winning 31 seats, which was the main reason for the ruling Democratic Justice Party's loss of an outright majority.

In the 1992 presidential election held in December, the UNP ran on a primarily economic agenda, criticising both the Democratic Liberal Party (DLP) of Kim Young-sam for falling behind on economic growth as well as Kim Dae-jung for being too "radical." It was speculated at the time that Chung would seek to primarily win over moderately conservative voters from the DLP, particularly the upper-middle class, but his performance was below expectations, obtaining only 16.1% of the popular vote and ending up in third place behind both Kims. After the election defeat, many members of the UNP defected in favour of the ruling DLP.

Sometime after the election, Chung was subjected to financial investigations and, in February 1993, resigned from the National Assembly and left the party while these investigations were ongoing. Chung was eventually sentenced to three years in prison for violating the Election Act and the Aggravated Punishment of Specific Economic Crimes Act. He was found guilty of diverting $62.8 million from Hyundai Group to his political campaigns, although he was not jailed due to his age.

In 1994, the New Political Reform Party merged with the Unification National Party in order to form the New Democratic Party.

== Leadership ==
No.	Leader	Tenure
1	Chung Ju-yung	8 February 1992 – 10 February 1993
Acting	Park Young-rok	11 February 1993 – 19 February 1993
2	Kim Dong-gil	20 February 1993 – 24 February 1993

== Electoral results ==
=== President ===
Election	Candidate	Votes	%	Result
1992	Chung Ju-yung	3,880,067	16.32	Not elected

=== Legislature ===
Election	Leader	Votes	%	Seats			Position	Status
Election	Leader	Votes	%	Constituency	Party list	Total	Position	Status
1992	Chung Ju-yung	3,574,419	17.37	24 / 237	7 / 62	31 / 299	3rd	Opposition
