= Kim Jong-pil =

Prime Minister of South Korea (1971–1975, 1998–2000)

His Excellency Kim Jong-pil
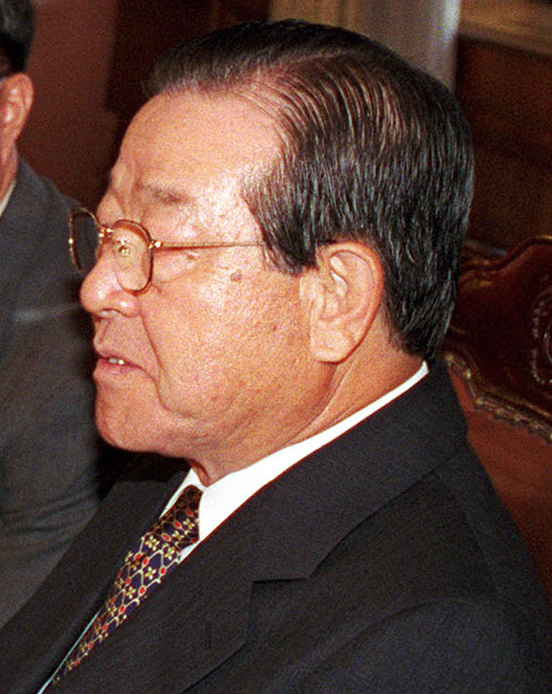
- Kim in 1999

11th & 31st Prime Minister of South Korea
- In office August 18, 1998 – January 12, 2000
- President: Kim Dae-jung
- Preceded by: Himself
- Succeeded by: Park Tae-joon
- In office March 3, 1998 – August 17, 1998 (acting)
- President: Kim Dae-jung
- Deputy: Lim Chang-yeol
- Preceded by: Goh Kun
- Succeeded by: Himself
- In office June 4, 1971 – December 18, 1975
- President: Park Chung Hee
- Deputy: Kim Hak-ryul; Tae Wan-seon; Nam Duck-woo
- Preceded by: Paik Too-chin
- Succeeded by: Choi Kyu-hah

Personal details
- Born: January 7, 1926 Buyeo County, Chūseinan Province, Korea, Empire of Japan
- Died: June 23, 2018 (aged 92) Seoul, South Korea
- Party: Independent
- Other political affiliations: Independent (2012–2018); Saenuri (2012); Grand National (2007–2012); Independent (2004–2007); United Liberal Democrats (1995–2004); Democratic Liberal (1990–1995); New Democratic Republican (1987–1990); Independent (1980–1987); Yushin Constitution (1973–1978); Democratic Republican (1963–1968, 1969–1973, 1978–1980); Reconstruction (1963); Independent (1960–1963, 1968–1969)
- Spouse: Park Young-ok (m. 1951; died 2015)
- Children: 2
- Education: Korean Military Academy
- Nickname: JP

Military service
- Allegiance: South Korea
- Branch/service: Republic of Korea Army
- Years of service: 1949–1961
- Rank: Brigadier General
- Battles/wars: Korean War

Korean name
- Hangul: 김종필
- Hanja: 金鍾泌
- RR: Gim Jongpil
- MR: Kim Chongp'il

Art name
- Hangul: 운정
- Hanja: 雲庭
- RR: Unjeong
- MR: Unjŏng

Kim Jong-pil (Korean: 김종필; pronounced [kimdʑoŋpʰil]; January 7, 1926 – June 23, 2018), also known colloquially as JP, was a South Korean politician and military intelligence officer who was the founder and first director of the Korean Central Intelligence Agency. He served as the prime minister twice, from 1971 to 1975 during the presidency of Park Chung Hee and from 1998 to 2000 during the presidency of Kim Dae-jung. He was a nine-term National Assembly member.

== Early life ==
Kim Jong-pil was born in Buyeo County, Chūseinan Province, Korea, Empire of Japan. He initially attended Seoul National University's College of Education but graduated from the Korea Military Academy (KMA) in 1949 (8th graduating class). From September 1951 to March 1952, he studied at the U.S. Infantry School at Fort Benning, Georgia. He participated in the Korean War as an intelligence officer of the Republic of Korea Army. He retired as a brigadier general.

== Political career ==
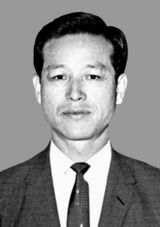
Kim in 1962

After the April Revolution, a citizens' and students' uprising against the Syngman Rhee dictatorship and election fraud in 1960, he engineered the May 16 coup, led by Major General Park Chung Hee in 1961 with his fellow Korea Military Academy (8th graduating class) classmates. He served in several high-profile offices, including chairman of the ruling Democratic Republican Party during Park's eighteen year presidency until his assassination in 1979.

Immediately following the successful coup that placed Park in power, Kim Jong-pil established the Korean Central Intelligence Agency (KCIA), becoming its first director. The KCIA wielded unlimited and unchecked power in support of Park's authoritarian rule, arbitrarily arresting, torturing, and persecuting Park's political opponents.

Thereafter, Kim spearheaded the effort to establish official diplomatic relations with Japan. In 1962, he traveled to Tokyo, where he met with Japanese Prime Minister Ikeda Hayato and urged the immediate normalization of relations between the two nations, although Ikeda replied that more preparation was needed. Normalization was eventually achieved in 1965. According to the "Kim-Ohira Memo" exchanged between Japanese Foreign Minister Masayoshi Ohira and Kim Jong-pil at that time, South Korea agreed to waive any further compensation for Korean victims of Japanese war crimes in exchange for $300 million US dollars in grants and $500 million in other economic assistance.

In 1963, Kim founded the Democratic Republican Party which helped President Park Chung Hee strengthen his power and maintain a legislative supermajority during his presidency. From 1971 to 1975, he served as Prime Minister of South Korea. He assumed the same position from 1998 to 2000 during Kim Dae-jung's presidency as part of the Alliance DJP.

In 1987, Kim Jong-pil staged a political comeback by creating a new political party known as the New Democratic Republican Party (NDRP). Most of the key party members and backers were conservatives who had served with him under the Park Chung Hee administration. Key members included Choi Gak-kyu, Kim Dong Kun (김동근 (1930)), Koo Ja-choon, Lee Hee-il, Kim Yong-tae, Cho Yong-jik, Kim Yong-hwan, Kim Moon-won, etc. As chairman of the NDRP, he ran for president and lost to Roh Tae-woo of the ruling Democratic Justice Party (DJP). In the 13th National Assembly legislative elections held in April 1988, the NDRP won 35 seats out of the 299-seat National Assembly.

In January 1990, Kim Jong-pil led the merger of his party with the ruling DJP and opposition party, Kim Young-sam's Reunification Democratic Party (RDP) to create the Democratic Liberal Party (DLP). Jong-pil became the Executive Chairman of the newly formed DLP and Kim Young-sam became the party's presidential nominee in the 1992 South Korea presidential elections, which he won.

The outline of Kim Jong-pil's positions hardly describes the skills of the politician in navigating the complexities of South Korean politics. Scholars note that he mastered the art of political coalitions. This is demonstrated in the way he was able to reemerge politically stronger after suffering various political setbacks. For instance, by October 1997, Kim Jong-pil's popularity had fluctuated, hovering between 2.9 percent and 4.6 percent, which was attributed to his reputation as being an integral member of the authoritarian rule of Park Chung Hee. part. This was further aggravated by the conservative party's image problem, which was identified with old politicians who have ethical flaws. Also, his main regional power base, the Chungcheon province, lacks the intense and unwavering loyalty to its political 'leaders' that is often found among those from neighbouring regions such as Chollado or Gyeongsangdo provinces.

Through political maneuvering, however, Kim Jong-pil struck a power-sharing deal with Kim Dae-jung's National Congress for New Politics, known as the DJP Alliance, which allowed him to choose half of the cabinet members of the Kim Dae-Jung administration. The deal also included his appointment as prime minister in March 1998 during Kim Dae-jung's presidency (1998–2003) for the second time.

In 2004, he announced his retirement from politics after his bid for a tenth term in the National Assembly failed and his party, the United Liberal Democrats, was unable to gain a sizable number of seats in the 2004 legislative election. The party later merged into the Grand National Party.

Kim Jong Pil was the last of the "Three Kims", which refers to himself, Kim Young-sam, and Kim Dae-jung, who dominated South Korea's politics for decades. Fate saw the presidency barely elude him on several occasions, earning him the title "the perennial no. 2 man". Chungcheong province, JP's main regional power base, lacks the intense and unwavering loyalty to its political leaders that is often found among those from neighboring regions, such as Jeolla Province and Gyeongsang Provinces.

== Scouting ==
He served as Korea Scout Association President until June 6, 1969. In 1967 he received the highest distinction of the Scout Association of Japan, the Golden Pheasant Award.

== Ancestry ==
He is the 12th generation descendant of Kim Ye-jik, (Note: 김예직; 金禮直) a military officer who served at Injo Coup in 1623 during the early Joseon period, and a younger brother of Royal Noble Consort Gongbin. Both are children of Kim Hui-Cheol, (Note: 김희철; 金希哲) known as Internal Prince Haeryeong, (Note: 해령부원군; 海寧府院君) the Musin who was killed during the Imjin War in 1592. Hui-Cheol is great-grandson of Kim Young-jeong, (Note: 김영정; 金永貞) both of them were civil ministers also during early Joseon period. Kim Young-Jeong is the 7th generation descendant of Kim Mok-kyung, (Note: 김목경; 金牧卿) the ancestor of the Gyeong branch of Gimhae Kim clan and the Samjungdaegwang during the reign of King Chunghye of Goryeo. Their lineage can be traced back to Kim Sam-kwang (Note: 김삼광; 金三光) who was the son of Kim Yu-sin. This makes him a descendant of the royal family of Geumgwan Gaya.

This fact is also revealed in the 2001 sentimental letter written to Bhimlendra Mohan Pratap Mishra, a king of erstwhile Ayodhya state with a history of 200 years old, Kim talked about his March 2001 visit to India. He mentioned it "remained very meaningful to me" as it "fulfilled his desire to visit Ayodhya, a princess of which became the queen of King Suro of Gaya and Heo Hwang-ok. I am the 72nd generation descendant of the King Kim Suro of the Garak Kingdom."

Kim was amongst more than a hundred historians and government representatives, including the North Korean ambassador to India, and an 18-member delegation from South Korea – led by former Gimhae Mayor Song Eun-bok – composed of prominent industrialists who inaugurated a memorial to their royal ancestor, Queen Hwang Huh on the west bank of the River Sarayu. The monument was built using a three-metre high stone weighing 7,500 kg, specially shipped from South Korea.

== Private life ==
On February 15, 1951, Kim married Park Young-ok (October 30, 1929 – February 21, 2015), who was President Park Chung Hee's niece. This made Park his uncle by marriage.

In 2008, Kim was hospitalized at Soonchunhyang Hospital in Seoul when he suffered a severe stroke while staying at his Seoul home, Then, in August 2009, Kim was unable to attend the state funeral of former President Kim Dae-jung due to illness. He spent four years in seclusion in his home. in April 2013, Kim attended the KBS Symphony Orchestra which was held at the Sejong Center in Seoul.

Kim died on June 23, 2018, at Sindang-dong, Seoul at the age of 92. His state funeral was held on June 24, 2018, and he was buried alongside his wife.

== Quotes ==
His words:

Politics are Heo-up (허업: futile works). The business men are Silup-ga (실업가), who takes his work fruits. But, Politician is Heop ga(허업가), whose fruit must be given to people. Fruits of politics were given to citizens. If it's taken by politicians, Politician's destiny is in jail.

Human being's death is truth. But, Everybody does not prepare their death even though they prepare for winter. (for preparing his tombstone monument inscription after his wife's death in 2015. Contents Soee budap (Just smile, No response) poem in his hometown of Buyeo, The Baekje kingdom capital.

Jawuiban Tawuiban (자의반 타의반): half my will Half others will.

== See also ==
- Politics of South Korea

== Election results ==
Year	Elections	Constituency	Political party	Votes (%)	Results
1963	6th National Assembly General Election	Buyeo (South Chungcheong)	DRP	45,999 (68.15%)	Won
1967	7th National Assembly General Election	Buyeo (South Chungcheong)	DRP	69,961 (91.06%)	Won
1971	8th National Assembly General Election	National (1st)	DRP	5,460,581 (48.77%)	Elected
1973	9th National Assembly General Election	National	Yushin	-	Elected
1978	10th National Assembly General Election	Buyeo–Seocheon–Boryeong (South Chungcheong)	DRP	134,513 (66.63%)	Won
1987	1987 Presidential Election	South Korea	NDRP	1,823,067 (8.06%)	Defeated (4th)
1988	13th National Assembly General Election	Buyeo (South Chungcheong)	NDRP	53,967 (81.88%)	Won
1992	14th National Assembly General Election	Buyeo (South Chungcheong)	DLP	42,358 (72.53%)	Won
1996	15th National Assembly General Election	Buyeo (South Chungcheong)	ULD	35,292 (66.35%)	Won
2000	16th National Assembly General Election	Proportional representation (1st)	ULD	1,859,331 (9.83%)	Elected
2004	17th National Assembly General Election	Proportional representation (1st)	ULD	600,462 (2.82%)	Not Elected

== Notes ==
Political offices
Preceded by Paik Too-chin	Prime Minister of South Korea; June 4 1971 – December 18 1975	Succeeded by Choi Kyu-ha
Preceded by Goh Kun	Prime Minister of South Korea (Acting); 3 March 1998 – 17 August 1998	Succeeded by Kim Jong-pil
Preceded by Goh Kun; Kim Jong-pil (Acting)	Prime Minister of South Korea; August 18 1998 – January 12 2000	Succeeded by Park Tae-joon
Preceded by position established	Director of the Korean Central Intelligence Agency; 20 May 1961 – 6 January 1963	Succeeded by Kim Yong-soon
National Assembly of the Republic of Korea
Preceded by Lee Seok-ki (Buyeo County A, South Chungcheong); Lee Jong-soon (Buyeo County B, South Chungcheong)	Member of the National Assembly from Buyeo County (South Chungcheong); 17 December 1963 – 30 June 1971	Succeeded by Kim Jong-lnk
Preceded by	Member of the National Assembly from National (1st, Democratic Republican Party); 1 July 1971 – 17 October 1972	Succeeded by
Preceded by	Member of the National Assembly from National (Yushin); 12 March 1973 – 11 March 1979	Succeeded by
Preceded by Kim Jong-lnk, Kim Ok-sun	Member of the National Assembly from Buyeo County–Seocheon County–Boryeong County (South Chungcheong); 12 March 1979 – 4 August 1980	Succeeded by Lee Sang-lnk, Cho joong-yeon
Preceded by Lee Sang-lnk, Kim Ok-sun (Buyeo County–Seocheon County–Boryeong County, South Chungcheong)	Member of the National Assembly from Buyeo County (South Chungcheong); 30 May 1988 – 29 May 2000	Succeeded by Kim Hak-won
Preceded by	Member of the National Assembly from Proportional representation (1st, United Liberal Democrats); 30 May 2000 – 29 May 2004	Succeeded by
Party political offices
Preceded by Yun Chi-young	Chairman of the Democratic Republican Party; 2 December 1963 – 5 June 1964	Succeeded by Jeong Gu-young
Preceded by Jeong Gu-young	Chairman of the Democratic Republican Party; 27 December 1965 – 30 May 1968	Succeeded by Yun Chi-young
Preceded by Park Chung Hee; Park Jun-kyu (Acting)	President of the Democratic Republican Party; 12 November 1979 – 3 July 1980	Succeeded by Chung Rae-hyuk (Acting) (Office abolished)
Preceded by Park Jun-kyu	Acting Chairman of the Democratic Republican Party; 14 November 1979 – 31 March 1980	Succeeded by Jeon Yae-yong
Preceded by New Office	President of the New Democratic Republican Party; 30 October 1987 – 5 February 1990	Succeeded by Office abolished
Preceded by Kim Young-sam	Chairman of the Democratic Liberal Party; 28 August 1992 – 20 January 1995	Succeeded by Lee Choon-koo
Preceded by New Office	President of the United Liberal Democrats; 30 March 1995 – 13 November 1997	Succeeded by Kim Bok-dong (Acting); Park Tae-joon
Preceded by Lee Han-dong; Kim Chong-hoh (Acting)	President of the United Liberal Democrats; 9 October 2001 – 16 April 2004	Succeeded by Lee In-je (Acting); Cho Bu-young (Acting); Kim Hak-won (Chairman of the United Liberal Democrats)
Preceded by Kim Chong-chul (Korean National Party nominee President South Korea)	New Democratic Republican Party nominee for President of South Korea; 1987	Succeeded by Office abolished
Preceded by New Office	United Liberal Democrats nominee for President of South Korea; 1997	Succeeded by Office abolished
