= New Korea Party =

1990–1997 political party in South Korea

New Korea Party 신한국당 新韓國黨
- Founded: 22 January 1990 (as Democratic Liberal Party); 6 December 1995 (as New Korea Party)
- Dissolved: 21 November 1997
- Merger of: Democratic Justice Party; Reunification Democratic Party (Note: Young-sam faction); New Democratic Republican Party
- Merged into: Grand National Party
- Headquarters: Seoul
- Ideology: Conservatism (South Korean); Neoliberalism; Liberal conservatism
- Political position: Centre-right to right-wing
- International affiliation: International Democrat Union
- Colors: Blue

- New Korea Party
- Hangul: 신한국당
- Hanja: 新韓國黨
- Revised Romanization: Sinhangukdang
- McCune–Reischauer: Sinhan'guktang

Democratic Liberal Party
- Hangul: 민주자유당
- Hanja: 民主自由黨
- Revised Romanization: Minjujayudang
- McCune–Reischauer: Minjujayudang

The New Korea Party (NKP; Korean: 신한국당; RR: Sinhangukdang) was founded by the merging of Roh Tae-woo's Democratic Justice Party, Kim Young-sam's Reunification Democratic Party and Kim Jong-pil's New Democratic Republican Party to form the Democratic Liberal Party (DLP; 민주자유당). It was renamed to New Korea Party in 1995.

In 1997, the NKP merged with the Democratic Party to form the Grand National Party.

== Election results ==
=== President ===
Election	Candidate	Votes	%	Result
1992	Kim Young-sam	9,977,332	41.96	Elected

=== Legislature ===
Election	Leader	Votes	%	Seats				Position	Status
Election	Leader	Votes	%	Constituency	Party list	Total	+/–	Position	Status
1992	Roh Tae-woo	7,923,719	38.49	116 / 237	33 / 62	149 / 299	new	1st	Government
1996	Kim Young-sam	6,783,730	34.52	121 / 253	18 / 46	139 / 299	▼10	1st	Opposition

=== Local ===
Election	Metropolitan mayor/Governor	Provincial legislature	Municipal mayor
1995	5 / 15	335 / 875	70 / 230

== Logos ==
Democratic Liberal Party (1990–1995)

Democratic Liberal Party (1995 local elections)
