= List of members of the National Assembly (South Korea), 1996–2000 =

The members of the fifteenth National Assembly of South Korea were elected on 11 April 1996. The Assembly sat from 30 May 1996 until 29 May 2000.

== Members ==
Province/city	Constituency	Member	Party	
Province/city	Constituency	Member	At election	At term's end
Seoul	Jongno	Lee Myung-bak (Note: Lee Myung-bak resigned on 21 February 1998.)	NKP	GNP
Seoul	Jongno	Roh Moo-hyun (Note: Roh Moo-hyun was by-elected on 21 July 1998, to succeed Lee Myung-bak.)	NCNP	MDP
Seoul	Jung	Park Sung-vum	NKP	GNP
Seoul	Yongsan	Suh Chung-hwa	NKP	GNP
Seoul	Seongdong A	Lee Sei-kee	NKP	GNP
Seoul	Seongdong B	Kim Hak-won	NKP	ULD
Seoul	Kwangjin A	Kim Sang-woo	NCNP	MDP
Seoul	Kwangjin B	Choo Mi-ae	NCNP	MDP
Seoul	Dongdaemun A	Ro Seung-woo	NKP	ULD
Seoul	Dongdaemun B	Kim Yung-koo	NKP	GNP
Seoul	Jungnang A	Lee Sang-soo	NCNP	MDP
Seoul	Jungnang B	Kim Choong-il	NKP	MDP
Seoul	Seongbuk A	Yoo Jay-kun	NCNP	MDP
Seoul	Seongbuk B	Kang Sung-jae	NKP	GNP
Seoul	Gangbuk A	Kim Won-gil	NCNP	MDP
Seoul	Gangbuk B	Chough Soon-hyung	NCNP	MDP
Seoul	Dobong A	Kim Geun-tae	NCNP	MDP
Seoul	Dobong B	Sul Hoon	NCNP	MDP
Seoul	Nowon A	Paek Nam-chi	NKP	ULD
Seoul	Nowon B	Lim Chae-jung	NCNP	MDP
Seoul	Eunpyeong A	Sonn Se-il	NCNP	MDP
Seoul	Eunpyeong B	Lee Jae-oh	NKP	GNP
Seoul	Seodaemun A	Kim Song-hyum	NCNP	DPP
Seoul	Seodaemun B	Chang Che-shik	NCNP	MDP
Seoul	Mapo A	Park Myung-hwan	NKP	GNP
Seoul	Mapo B	Park Joo-cheon	NKP	GNP
Seoul	Yangcheon A	Park Bum-jin	NKP	MDP
Seoul	Yangcheon B	Kim Yung-bae	NCNP	MDP
Seoul	Gangseo A	Shin Ki-nam	NCNP	MDP
Seoul	Gangseo B	Lee Shin-bom	NKP	GNP
Seoul	Guro A	Chung Han-young	NCNP	ULD
Seoul	Guro B	Lee Shin-haeng (Note: Lee Shin-haeng was removed on 22 December 1998, after his election was invalidated.)	NKP	GNP
Seoul	Guro B	Han Gwang-ok (Note: Han Gwang-ok was by-elected on 30 March 1999, to succeed Lee Shin-haeng.)	NCNP	NCNP
Seoul	Geumcheon	Lee Woo-jae	NKP	GNP
Seoul	Yeongdeungpo A	Kim Myung-sup	NKP	MDP
Seoul	Yeongdeungpo B	Kim Min-seok	NCNP	MDP
Seoul	Dongjak A	Suh Chung-won	NKP	GNP
Seoul	Dongjak B	Yoo Yong-tae	NKP	MDP
Seoul	Gwanak A	Lee Sang-hyun	NKP	ULD
Seoul	Gwanak B	Lee Hae-chan	NCNP	MDP
Seoul	Seocho A	Choe Byung-yul (Note: Choe Byung-yul resigned on 29 April 1998, to run in the 1998 Seoul mayoral election.)	NKP	GNP
Seoul	Seocho A	Park Won-hong (Note: Park Won-hong was by-elected on 21 July 1998, to succeed Choe Byung-yul.)	GNP	GNP
Seoul	Seocho B	Kim Deog-ryong	NKP	GNP
Seoul	Gangnam A	Suh Sang-mok (Note: Suh Sang-mok resigned on 6 September 1999.)	NKP	GNP
Seoul	Gangnam B	Hong Sa-duk	Independent	GNP
Seoul	Songpa A	Hong Jun-pyo (Note: Hong Jun-pyo was removed on 3 June 1999, after his election was invalidated.)	NKP	GNP
Seoul	Songpa A	Lee Hoi-chang (Note: Lee Hoi-chang was by-elected on 3 June 1999, to succeed Hong Jun-pyo.)	GNP	GNP
Seoul	Songpa B	Maeng Hyung-kyu	NKP	GNP
Seoul	Songpa C	Kim Byong-tae	NCNP	MDP
Seoul	Gangdong A	Lee Bu-young	UDP	GNP
Seoul	Gangdong B	Kim Zoong-wie	NKP	GNP
Busan	Jung–Dong	Chung Ui-hwa	NKP	GNP
Busan	Seo	Hong In-kil (Note: Hong In-kil was removed on 26 December 1997.)	NKP	GNP
Busan	Seo	Chung Moon-hwa (Note: Chung Moon-hwa was by-elected on 2 April 1998, to succeed Hong In-kil.)	GNP	GNP
Busan	Yeongdo	Kim Hyong-o	NKP	GNP
Busan	Busanjin A	Chung Jey-moon	NKP	GNP
Busan	Busanjin B	Kim Jeung-soo	NKP	GNP
Busan	Dongrae A	Park Kwan-yong	NKP	GNP
Busan	Dongrae B	Kang Kyong-shik	NKP	Independent
Busan	Nam A	Rhee Shang-hi	NKP	GNP
Busan	Nam B	Kim Moo-sung	NKP	GNP
Busan	Buk–Gangseo A	Chung Hyung-keun	NKP	GNP
Busan	Buk–Gangseo B	Han Lee-hun	NKP	Independent
Busan	Haeundae–Gijang A	Kim Woon-hwan	NKP	MDP
Busan	Haeundae–Gijang B	Kim Ki-jai (Note: Kim Ki-jai resigned on 6 April 1998, to run in the 1998 Busan mayoral election.)	NKP	GNP
Busan	Haeundae–Gijang B	Kim Dong-joo (Note: Kim Dong-joo was by-elected on 21 July 1998, to succeed Kim Ki-jai.)	ULD	DPP
Busan	Saha A	Seo Seok-jai	NKP	Independent
Busan	Saha B	Park Chong-ung	NKP	GNP
Busan	Geumjeong A	Kim Jin-jae	NKP	GNP
Busan	Geumjeong B	Kim Do-eon	NKP	GNP
Busan	Yeonje	Choi Hyung-woo	NKP	GNP
Busan	Suyeong	Yoo Heung-soo	NKP	GNP
Busan	Sasang A	Kwon Chul-hyun	NKP	GNP
Busan	Sasang B	Shin Sang-woo	NKP	DPP
Daegu	Jung	Park Jyun-kyu	ULD	Independent
Daegu	Dong A	Kim Bok-dong (Note: Kim Bok-dong died on 19 April 2000.)	ULD	ULD
Daegu	Dong B	Suh Hoon	Independent	DPP
Daegu	Seo A	Baek Seung-hong	Independent	GNP
Daegu	Seo B	Kang Jae-sup	NKP	GNP
Daegu	Nam	Lee Jung-moo	ULD	ULD
Daegu	Buk A	Rhee Yeui-yick (Note: Rhee Yeui-yick resigned on 2 May 1998, to run in the 1998 Daegu mayoral election.)	ULD	GNP
Daegu	Buk A	Park Sung-kook (Note: Park Sung-kook was by-elected on 21 July 1998, to succeed Rhee Yeui-yick.)	GNP	GNP
Daegu	Buk B	Ahn Taek-soo	ULD	GNP
Daegu	Suseong A	Park Chul-un	ULD	ULD
Daegu	Suseong B	Park Koo-il	ULD	ULD
Daegu	Dalseo A	Park Jong-keun	ULD	GNP
Daegu	Dalseo B	Lee Hae-bong	Independent	GNP
Daegu	Dalseong	Kim Suk-won (Note: Kim Suk-won resigned on 17 February 1998.)	NKP	GNP
Daegu	Dalseong	Park Geun-hye (Note: Park Geun-hye was by-elected on 2 April 1998, to succeed Kim Suk-won.)	GNP	GNP
Incheon	Jung–Dong–Ongjin	Suh Jung-hwa	NKP	MDP
Incheon	Nam A	Shim Chung-ku	NKP	GNP
Incheon	Nam B	Lee Kang-hee	NKP	MDP
Incheon	Yeonsu	Suh Han-saem	NKP	MDP
Incheon	Namdong A	Lee Yoon-sung	NKP	GNP
Incheon	Namdong B	Lee Weon-bok	NKP	GNP
Incheon	Bupyeong A	Cho Jin-hyeong	NKP	GNP
Incheon	Bupyeong B	Lee Jae-myung	NKP	MDP
Incheon	Gyeyang–Ganghwa A	Lee Ki-moon (Note: Lee Ki-moon was removed on 12 March 1999, after his election was invalidated.)	NCNP	NCNP
Incheon	Gyeyang–Ganghwa A	Ahn Sang-soo (Note: Ahn Sang-soo was by-elected on 3 June 1999, to succeed Lee Ki-moon.)	GNP	GNP
Incheon	Gyeyang–Ganghwa B	Lee Kyeong-jae	NKP	GNP
Incheon	Seo	Joh Cheol-koo (Note: Joh Cheol-koo died on 30 December 1996.)	NCNP	NCNP
Incheon	Seo	Cho Han-chun (Note: Cho Han-chun was by-elected on 5 March 1997, to succeed Joh Cheol-koo.)	NCNP	MDP
Gwangju	Dong	Shin Ki-ha (Note: Shin Ki-ha died in the Korean Air Flight 801 crash on 6 August 1997.)	NCNP	NCNP
Gwangju	Dong	Lee Young-il (Note: Lee Young-il was by-elected on 18 December 1997, to succeed Shin Ki-ha.)	NCNP	MDP
Gwangju	Seo	Chung Dong-chae	NCNP	MDP
Gwangju	Nam	Lim Bok-jin	NCNP	MDP
Gwangju	Buk A	Park Kwang-tae	NCNP	MDP
Gwangju	Buk B	Lee Kil-jae	NCNP	MDP
Gwangju	Gwangsan	Cho Hong-kyu	NCNP	MDP
Daejeon	Dong A	Kim Chil-hwan	ULD	GNP
Daejeon	Dong B	Lee Yang-hee	ULD	ULD
Daejeon	Jung	Kang Chang-hee	ULD	ULD
Daejeon	Seo A	Lee Won-bum	ULD	ULD
Daejeon	Seo B	Lee Jae-sun	ULD	ULD
Daejeon	Yuseong	Cho Young-jae	ULD	GNP
Daejeon	Daedeok	Lee In-koo	ULD	Independent
Gyeonggi Province	Jangan, Suwon	Lee Byeong-heui (Note: Lee Byeong-heui died on 13 January 1997.)	ULD	ULD
Gyeonggi Province	Jangan, Suwon	Lee Tae-sup (Note: Lee Tae-sup was by-elected on 5 March 1997, to succeed Lee Byeong-heui.)	ULD	ULD
Gyeonggi Province	Gwonseon, Suwon	Kim In-young	NKP	MDP
Gyeonggi Province	Paldal, Suwon	Nam Pyeong-woo (Note: Nam Pyeong-woo died on 13 March 1998.)	NKP	GNP
Gyeonggi Province	Paldal, Suwon	Nam Kyung-pil (Note: Nam Kyung-pil was by-elected on 21 July 1998, to succeed Nam Pyeong-woo.)	GNP	GNP
Gyeonggi Province	Sujeong, Seongnam	Lee Yoon-soo	NCNP	MDP
Gyeonggi Province	Jungwon, Seongnam	Cho Sung-joon	NCNP	MDP
Gyeonggi Province	Bundang, Seongnam	Oh Se-eung	NKP	ULD
Gyeonggi Province	Uijeongbu	Hong Moon-jong	NKP	Independent
Gyeonggi Province	Manan, Anyang	Kwon Soo-chang (Note: Kwon Soo-chang died on 18 July 1997.)	ULD	ULD
Gyeonggi Province	Manan, Anyang	Kim Il-joo (Note: Kim Il-joo was by-elected on 4 September 1997, to succeed Kwon Soo-chang.)	ULD	ULD
Gyeonggi Province	Dongan A, Anyang	Choi Hee-joon	NCNP	MDP
Gyeonggi Province	Dongan B, Anyang	Lee Seok-hyun	NCNP	MDP
Gyeonggi Province	Wonmi A, Bucheon	An Dong-seon	NCNP	MDP
Gyeonggi Province	Wonmi B, Bucheon	Lee Sa-churl	NKP	GNP
Gyeonggi Province	Sosa, Bucheon	Kim Moon-soo	NKP	GNP
Gyeonggi Province	Ojeong, Bucheon	Choi Seon-young	NCNP	MDP
Gyeonggi Province	Gwangmyeong A	Nam Kung-jin	NCNP	MDP
Gyeonggi Province	Gwangmyeong	Sohn Hak-kyu (Note: Sohn Hak-kyu resigned on 6 April 1998, to run in the 1998 Gyeonggi gubernatorial election.)	NKP	GNP
Gyeonggi Province	Gwangmyeong	Cho Se-hyung (Note: Cho Se-hyung was by-elected on 21 July 1998, to succeed Sohn Hak-kyu.)	NCNP	MDP
Gyeonggi Province	Pyeongtaek City A	Won Yoo-chul	Independent	MDP
Gyeonggi Province	Pyeongtaek City B	Huh Nam-hoon	ULD	ULD
Gyeonggi Province	Dongducheon–Yangju	Mok Yo-sang	NKP	GNP
Gyeonggi Province	Ansan A	Kim Young-hwan	NCNP	MDP
Gyeonggi Province	Ansan B	Chun Jung-bae	NCNP	MDP
Gyeonggi Province	Deokyang, Goyang	Lee Kook-hun	NKP	GNP
Gyeonggi Province	Ilsan, Goyang	Lee Taek-seok	NKP	ULD
Gyeonggi Province	Gwacheon–Uiwang	Ahn Sang-soo	NKP	GNP
Gyeonggi Province	Guri	Jun Yong-won	NKP	GNP
Gyeonggi Province	Namyangju	Lee Sung-ho	NKP	MDP
Gyeonggi Province	Osan–Hwaseong	Park Shin-won	ULD	ULD
Gyeonggi Province	Siheung	Jei Jung-ku (Note: Jei Jung-ku died on 9 February 1999.)	UDP	GNP
Gyeonggi Province	Siheung	Kim Uei-jae (Note: Kim Uei-jae was by-elected on 30 March 1999, to succeed Jei Jung-ku.)	ULD	ULD
Gyeonggi Province	Gunpo	Yu Seon-ho	NCNP	MDP
Gyeonggi Province	Hanam–Gwangju	Jeong Yeong-hun	NKP	MDP
Gyeonggi Province	Yeoju	Rhee Q-taek	UDP	GNP
Gyeonggi Province	Paju	Lee Jai-chang	ULD	GNP
Gyeonggi Province	Yeoncheon–Pocheon	Lee Han-dong	NKP	ULD
Gyeonggi Province	Gapyeong–Yangpyeong	Kim Kil-hwan	NKP	MDP
Gyeonggi Province	Icheon	Hwang Kyu-sun	UDP	GNP
Gyeonggi Province	Yongin	Lee Woong-hee	NKP	Independent
Gyeonggi Province	Anseong	Lee Hae-koo	NKP	GNP
Gyeonggi Province	Gimpo	Park Chong-woo	Independent	MDP
Gangwon Province	Chuncheon A	Han Seung-soo	NKP	DPP
Gangwon Province	Chuncheon B	Ryu Chong-su	ULD	GNP
Gangwon Province	Wonju A	Hahm Jong-han	NKP	GNP
Gangwon Province	Wonju B	Kim Young-jin	NKP	ULD
Gangwon Province	Gangneung A	Hwang Hak-soo	ULD	Independent
Gangwon Province	Gangneung B	Choi Wook-cheul (Note: Choi Wook-cheul was removed on 24 March 1998, after his election was invalidated.)	UDP	GNP
Gangwon Province	Gangneung B	Cho Soon (Note: Cho Soon was by-elected on 21 July 1998, to succeed Choi Wook-cheul.)	GNP	DPP
Gangwon Province	Donghae	Choi Yeon-hee	NKP	GNP
Gangwon Province	Taebaek–Jeongseon	Park Woo-byeong	NKP	GNP
Gangwon Province	Sokcho–Goseong–Yangyang–Inje	Song Hun-suk	NKP	MDP
Gangwon Province	Samcheok	Chang Eul-byung	UDP	MDP
Gangwon Province	Hongcheon–Hoengseong	Lee Eung-sun	NKP	GNP
Gangwon Province	Yeongwol–Pyeongchang	Kim Ki-soo	NKP	ULD
Gangwon Province	Cheolwon–Hwacheon–Yanggu	Lee Yong-sam	NKP	MDP
North Chungcheong Province	Sangdang, Cheongju	Koo Cheon-seo	ULD	ULD
North Chungcheong Province	Heungdeok, Cheongju	Oh Yong-woon	ULD	ULD
North Chungcheong Province	Chungju	Kim Sun-kil	ULD	ULD
North Chungcheong Province	Jecheon–Danyang	Kim Young-jun	Independent	GNP
North Chungcheong Province	Cheongwon	Shin Kyung-shik	NKP	GNP
North Chungcheong Province	Boeun–Okcheon–Yeongdong	Auh June-sun	ULD	Independent
North Chungcheong Province	Jincheon–Eumseong	Chung Woo-taik	ULD	ULD
North Chungcheong Province	Gwisan	Kim Chong-hoh	NKP	ULD
South Chungcheong Province	Cheonan A	Jeong Ill-young	ULD	ULD
South Chungcheong Province	Cheonan B	Ham Suk-jae	ULD	ULD
South Chungcheong Province	Gongju	Chung Seok-mo	ULD	ULD
South Chungcheong Province	Boryeong	Kim Yong-hwan	ULD	NKPH
South Chungcheong Province	Asan	Lee Sang-man	ULD	NKPH
South Chungcheong Province	Seosan–Taean	Byun Ung-jun	ULD	ULD
South Chungcheong Province	Nonsan–Geumsan	Kim Bum-myung	ULD	ULD
South Chungcheong Province	Yeongi	Kim Ko-sung	ULD	NKPH
South Chungcheong Province	Buyeo	Kim Jong-pil	ULD	ULD
South Chungcheong Province	Seocheon	Lee Keung-kyu	ULD	ULD
South Chungcheong Province	Cheongyang–Hongseong	Lee One-ku	NKP	ULD
South Chungcheong Province	Yesan	Cho Jong-souk (Note: Cho Jong-souk was removed on 11 April 1997, after his election was invalidated.)	ULD	ULD
South Chungcheong Province	Yesan	Oh Jang-seop (Note: Oh Jang-seop was by-elected on 24 July 1997, to succeed Cho Jong-souk.)	NKP	ULD
South Chungcheong Province	Dangjin	Kim Hyun-uk	ULD	ULD
North Jeolla Province	Wansan, Jeonju	Chang Young-dal	NCNP	MDP
North Jeolla Province	Deokjin, Jeonju	Chung Dong-young	NCNP	MDP
North Jeolla Province	Gunsan A	Chae Young-suk	NCNP	MDP
North Jeolla Province	Gunsan B	Kang Hyun-wook	NKP	MDP
North Jeolla Province	Iksan A	Choi Jae-sung	NCNP	MDP
North Jeolla Province	Iksan B	Lee Hyup	NCNP	MDP
North Jeolla Province	Jeongeup	Yoon Chul-san	NCNP	MDP
North Jeolla Province	Namwon	Cho Chan-hyoung	NCNP	MDP
North Jeolla Province	Gimje City	Chang Sung-won	NCNP	MDP
North Jeolla Province	Wanju	Kim Tai-shik	NCNP	MDP
North Jeolla Province	Jinan–Muju–Jangsu	Chung Sye-kyun	NCNP	MDP
North Jeolla Province	Imsil–Sunchang	Park Jung-hoon	NCNP	DPP
North Jeolla Province	Gochang	Chung Kyun-hwan	NCNP	MDP
North Jeolla Province	Buan	Kim Jin-bae	NCNP	MDP
South Jeolla Province	Mokpo–Sinan A	Kim Hong-il	NCNP	MDP
South Jeolla Province	Mokpo–Sinan B	Hahn Hwa-kap	NCNP	MDP
South Jeolla Province	Yeosu	Kim Choong-joh	NCNP	MDP
South Jeolla Province	Suncheon A	Kim Kyung-jae	NCNP	MDP
South Jeolla Province	Suncheon B	Cho Soon-sung	NCNP	MDP
South Jeolla Province	Naju	Chung Ho-sun	NCNP	MDP
South Jeolla Province	Yeocheon City–Yeocheon County	Kim Sung-gon	NCNP	MDP
South Jeolla Province	Gwangyang	Kim Myung-kyu	NCNP	MDP
South Jeolla Province	Damyang–Jangseong	Kook Chang-keun	NCNP	MDP
South Jeolla Province	Gokseong–Gurye	Yang Sung-chul	NCNP	MDP
South Jeolla Province	Goheung	Park Sang-cheon	NCNP	MDP
South Jeolla Province	Boseong–Hwasun	Bahk Chan-ju	NCNP	MDP
South Jeolla Province	Jangheung–Yeongam	Kim Ok-doo	NCNP	MDP
South Jeolla Province	Gangjin–Wando	Kim Young-jin	NCNP	MDP
South Jeolla Province	Haenam–Jindo	Kim Bong-ho	NCNP	MDP
South Jeolla Province	Muan	Bae Chong-moo	NCNP	MDP
South Jeolla Province	Hampyeong–Yeonggwang	Kim In-kon	NCNP	MDP
North Gyeongsang Province	Buk, Pohang	Hur Hwa-pyung (Note: Hur Hwa-pyung was removed on 17 April 1997.)	Independent	Independent
North Gyeongsang Province	Buk, Pohang	Park Tae-joon (Note: Park Tae-joon was by-elected on 24 July 1997, to succeed Hur Hwa-pyung.)	Independent	ULD
North Gyeongsang Province	Nam, Pohang–Ulleung	Lee Sang-deuk	NKP	Independent
North Gyeongsang Province	Gyeongju A	Kim Il-yun	Independent	ULD
North Gyeongsang Province	Gyeongju B	Lim Jin-chool	Independent	GNP
North Gyeongsang Province	Gimcheon	Rim In-bae	NKP	GNP
North Gyeongsang Province	Andong A	Kwon Oh-eul	UDP	GNP
North Gyeongsang Province	Andong B	Kwon Jong-dal	Independent	MDP
North Gyeongsang Province	Gumi A	Park Seh-jik	NKP	ULD
North Gyeongsang Province	Gumi B	Kim Yoon-whan	NKP	DPP
North Gyeongsang Province	Yeongju	Park Si-kyun	Independent	GNP
North Gyeongsang Province	Yeongcheon	Park Heon-ki	NKP	GNP
North Gyeongsang Province	Sangju	Lee Sang-bae	NKP	GNP
North Gyeongsang Province	Mungyeong–Yecheon	Hwang Byung-tai (Note: Hwang Byung-tai was removed on 26 December 1997.)	NKP	GNP
North Gyeongsang Province	Mungyeong–Yecheon	Shin Yung-kook (Note: Shin Yung-kook was by-elected on 2 April 1998, to succeed Hwang Byung-tai.)	GNP	GNP
North Gyeongsang Province	Gyeongsan–Cheongdo	Kim Jong-hak	ULD	ULD
North Gyeongsang Province	Goryeong–Seongju	Choo Jin-woo	NKP	GNP
North Gyeongsang Province	Gunwi–Chilgok	Chang Yung-chul	NKP	MDP
North Gyeongsang Province	Uiseong	Kim Hwa-nam (Note: Kim Hwa-nam was removed on 26 December 1997, after his election was invalidated.)	ULD	Independent
North Gyeongsang Province	Uiseong	Chung Chang-wha (Note: Chung Chang-wha was by-elected on 2 April 1998, to succeed Kim Hwa-nam.)	GNP	GNP
North Gyeongsang Province	Cheongsong–Yeongdeok	Kim Chan-woo	NKP	GNP
North Gyeongsang Province	Yeongyang–Bonghwa–Uljin	Kim Kwang-won	NKP	GNP
South Gyeongsang Province	Changwon A	Kim Jong-ha	NKP	GNP
South Gyeongsang Province	Changwon B	Hwang Nak-joo	NKP	GNP
South Gyeongsang Province	Jung, Ulsan	Kim Tae-ho	NKP	GNP
South Gyeongsang Province	Nam, Ulsan A	Cha Soo-myung	NKP	ULD
South Gyeongsang Province	Nam, Ulsan B	Lee Kyu-jeong	UDP	MDP
South Gyeongsang Province	Dong, Ulsan	Chung Mong-joon	Independent	Independent
South Gyeongsang Province	Ulju, Ulsan	Kwon Ki-sool	UDP	GNP
South Gyeongsang Province	Hampo, Masan	Kim Ho-il	NKP	GNP
South Gyeongsang Province	Hoewon, Masan	Kang Sam-jae	NKP	GNP
South Gyeongsang Province	Jinju A	Kim Jae-chun	Independent	Independent
South Gyeongsang Province	Jinju B	Ha Soon-bong	NKP	GNP
South Gyeongsang Province	Jinhae	Hur Dae-bom	NKP	GNP
South Gyeongsang Province	Tongyeong–Goseong	Kim Dong-wook	NKP	GNP
South Gyeongsang Province	Sacheon	Hwang Seong-gyun	Independent	GNP
South Gyeongsang Province	Gimhae	Kim Young-iel	NKP	GNP
South Gyeongsang Province	Milyang	Kim Yong-kap	Independent	GNP
South Gyeongsang Province	Geoje	Kim Ki-choon	NKP	GNP
South Gyeongsang Province	Uiryeong–Haman	Yun Han-doo	NKP	GNP
South Gyeongsang Province	Changnyeong	Roh Ki-tae	NKP	Independent
South Gyeongsang Province	Yangsan	Lah Oh-yeon	NKP	GNP
South Gyeongsang Province	Namhae–Hadong	Park Hee-tae	NKP	GNP
South Gyeongsang Province	Sancheong–Hamyang	Kwon Ik-hyun	NKP	GNP
South Gyeongsang Province	Geochang–Hamcheon	Lee Kang-too	NKP	GNP
Jeju Province	Jeju	Hyun Kyung-dae	NKP	GNP
Jeju Province	Bukjeju	Yang Jung-kyu	NKP	GNP
Jeju Province	Seogwipo–Namjeju	Byon Jong-il	NKP	GNP
National	Proportional representation	Lee Hoi-chang (Note: Lee Hoi-chang resigned on 26 November 1997, to run in the 1997 South Korean presidential election.)	NKP	GNP
National	Proportional representation	Lee Hong-koo (Note: Lee Hong-koo was removed on 14 April 1998.)	NKP	GNP
National	Proportional representation	Lee Man-sup (Note: Lee Man-sup was removed on 28 October 1997.)	NKP	NKP
National	Proportional representation	Kim Myung-yoon	NKP	GNP
National	Proportional representation	Kwon Young-ja	NKP	GNP
National	Proportional representation	Kim Soo-han	NKP	GNP
National	Proportional representation	Kim Deok	NKP	GNP
National	Proportional representation	Shin Young-kyun	NKP	GNP
National	Proportional representation	Park Se-hawn	NKP	GNP
National	Proportional representation	Chung Jae-chull (Note: Chung Jae-chull was removed on 26 December 1997.)	NKP	GNP
National	Proportional representation	Jun Suk-hong	NKP	GNP
National	Proportional representation	Cho Woong-kyu	NKP	GNP
National	Proportional representation	Oh Yang-soon	NKP	GNP
National	Proportional representation	Kim Chull (Note: Kim Chull was removed on 22 February 2000.)	NKP	GNP
National	Proportional representation	Hwang Woo-yea	NKP	GNP
National	Proportional representation	Kim Young-sun	NKP	GNP
National	Proportional representation	Yoon Won-joong (Note: Yoon Won-joong was removed on 8 March 2000.)	NKP	GNP
National	Proportional representation	Kang Yong-sik	NKP	GNP
National	Proportional representation	Kim Chan-jin (Note: Kim Chan-jin took office on 28 October 1997, to succeed Lee Man-sup.)	NKP	GNP
National	Proportional representation	Lee Chan-jin (Note: Lee Chan-jin took office on 26 November 1997, to succeed Lee Hoi-chang, but resigned on 19 May 1998.)	GNP (Note: Included in the New Korea Party list in the 1996 election.)	GNP
National	Proportional representation	Kim Jung-sook (Note: Kim Jung-sook took office on 26 December 1997, to succeed Chung Jae-chull.)	GNP	GNP
National	Proportional representation	Cho Ik-hyon (Note: Cho Ik-hyon took office on 14 April 1998, to succeed Lee Hong-koo.)	GNP	GNP
National	Proportional representation	Ahn Jae-hong (Note: Ahn Jae-hong took office on 19 May 1998, to succeed Lee Chan-jin.)	GNP	GNP
National	Proportional representation	Hwan Seung-min (Note: Hwan Seung-min took office on 22 February 2000, to succeed Kim Chull.)	GNP	GNP
National	Proportional representation	Park Chang-dal (Note: Park Chang-dal took office on 8 March 2000, to succeed Yoon Won-joong.)	GNP	GNP
National	Proportional representation	Chung Hee-kyung	NCNP	MDP
National	Proportional representation	Park Sang-gyu	NCNP	MDP
National	Proportional representation	Lee Seung-jae	NCNP	MDP
National	Proportional representation	Kil Soong-hoom	NCNP	MDP
National	Proportional representation	Park Chung-soo	NCNP	MDP
National	Proportional representation	Kim Han-gil (Note: Kim Han-gil resigned on 3 March 1999, upon being appointed as Senior Presidential Secretary for Policy.)	NCNP	NCNP
National	Proportional representation	Lee Tong-won	NCNP	MDP
National	Proportional representation	Shin Nak-yun	NCNP	MDP
National	Proportional representation	Kwon Roh-kap (Note: Kwon Roh-kap was removed on 26 December 1997.)	NCNP	NCNP
National	Proportional representation	Chun Yong-taek (Note: Chun Yong-taek resigned on 25 May 1999, upon being appointed as director of the National Intelligence Service.)	NCNP	NCNP
National	Proportional representation	Han Young-ae	NCNP	MDP
National	Proportional representation	Bang Young-seok	NCNP	MDP
National	Proportional representation	Kim Jong-bae	NCNP	MDP
National	Proportional representation	Song Hyun-sup (Note: Song Hyun-sup took office on 26 December 1997, to succeed Kwon Roh-kap.)	NCNP	MDP
National	Proportional representation	Lee Hoon-pyung (Note: Lee Hoon-pyung took office on 3 March 1999, to succeed Kim Han-gil.)	NCNP	MDP
National	Proportional representation	Kim Tae-rang (Note: Kim Tae-rang took office on 25 May 1999, to succeed Chun Yong-taek.)	NCNP	MDP
National	Proportional representation	Chung Sang-koo	ULD	ULD
National	Proportional representation	Han Young-soo	ULD	ULD
National	Proportional representation	Lee Kun-kae	ULD	ULD
National	Proportional representation	Kim Hur-nam	ULD	ULD
National	Proportional representation	Kim Kwang-soo	ULD	ULD
National	Proportional representation	Chi Dae-sup (Note: Chi Dae-sup was removed on 7 February 2000.)	ULD	ULD
National	Proportional representation	Chung Sang-chun (Note: Chung Sang-chun resigned on 31 March 1999, upon being appointed as Minister of Oceans and Fisheries.)	ULD	ULD
National	Proportional representation	Lee Dong-bok	ULD	ULD
National	Proportional representation	Han Ho-sun (Note: Han Ho-sun resigned on 6 March 1998, to run in the 1998 Gangwon Province gubernatorial election.)	ULD	ULD
National	Proportional representation	Kang Jong-hee (Note: Kang Jong-hee took office on 6 March 1998, to succeed Han Ho-sun.)	ULD	ULD
National	Proportional representation	Song Eop-gyo (Note: Song Eop-gyo took office on 31 March 1999, to succeed Chung Sang-chun, but was removed on 15 February 2000.)	ULD	ULD
National	Proportional representation	Joo Yang-ja (Note: Joo Yang-ja took office on 7 February 2000, to succeed Chi Dae-sup.)	ULD	ULD
National	Proportional representation	Park Sang-bok (Note: Park Sang-bok took office on 15 February 2000, to succeed Song Eop-gyo.)	ULD	ULD
National	Proportional representation	Lee Choong-jae	UDP	GNP
National	Proportional representation	Lee Mi-kyung	UDP	MDP
National	Proportional representation	Lee Soo-in	UDP	Independent
National	Proportional representation	Kim Hong-shin	UDP	GNP
National	Proportional representation	Cho Chung-youn (Note: Cho Chung-youn died on 17 November 1998.)	UDP	GNP
National	Proportional representation	Har Kyoung-kun	UDP	GNP
National	Proportional representation	Lee Hyoung-bae (Note: Lee Hyoung-bae took office on 17 November 1998, to succeed Cho Chung-youn.)	GNP (Note: Included in the United Democratic Party list in the 1996 election.)	GNP
