= List of members of the National Assembly (South Korea), 2000–2004 =

The members of the sixteenth National Assembly of South Korea were elected on 13 April 2000. The Assembly sat from 30 May 2000 until 29 May 2004.

== Members ==
Province/city	Constituency	Member	Party	
Province/city	Constituency	Member	At election	At term's end
Seoul	Jongno	Chung In-bong (Note: Chung In-bong was removed on 25 June 2002, after his election was invalidated.)	GNP	GNP
Seoul	Jongno	Park Jin (Note: Park Jin was by-elected on 8 August 2002, to succeed Chung In-bong.)	GNP	GNP
Seoul	Jung	Chyung Dai-chul	MDP	Uri
Seoul	Yongsan	Seol Song-woong	MDP	Uri
Seoul	Seongdong	Im Jong-seok	MDP	Uri
Seoul	Gwangjin A	Kim Young-choon	GNP	Uri
Seoul	Gwangjin B	Choo Mi-ae	MDP	MDP
Seoul	Dongdaemun A	Kim Hee-sun	MDP	Uri
Seoul	Dongdaemun B	Kim Yung-koo (Note: Kim Yung-koo was removed on 1 June 2001, after his election was invalidated.)	GNP	GNP
Seoul	Dongdaemun B	Hong Joon-pyo (Note: Hong Joon-pyo was by-elected on 25 October 2001, to succeed Kim Yung-koo.)	GNP	GNP
Seoul	Jungnang A	Lee Sang-soo	MDP	Uri
Seoul	Jungnang B	Kim Duk-kyu	MDP	Uri
Seoul	Seongbuk A	Yoo Jay-kun	MDP	Uri
Seoul	Seongbuk B	Shin Geh-ryoon	MDP	Uri
Seoul	Gangbuk A	Kim Won-gil	MDP	GNP
Seoul	Gangbuk B	Chough Soon-hyung	MDP	MDP
Seoul	Dobong A	Kim Geun-tae	MDP	Uri
Seoul	Dobong B	Sul Hoon	MDP	MDP
Seoul	Nowon A	Ham Seung-heui	MDP	MDP
Seoul	Nowon B	Lim Chae-jung	MDP	Uri
Seoul	Eunpyeong A	Kang In-sup	GNP	GNP
Seoul	Eunpyeong B	Lee Jae-oh	GNP	GNP
Seoul	Seodaemun A	Lee Sung-hun	GNP	GNP
Seoul	Seodaemun B	Chang Che-shik	MDP	MDP
Seoul	Mapo A	Park Myung-hwan	GNP	GNP
Seoul	Mapo B	Park Joo-cheon	GNP	Independent
Seoul	Yangcheon A	Won Hee-ryong	GNP	GNP
Seoul	Yangcheon B	Kim Yung-bae (Note: Kim Yung-bae was removed on 28 March 2003, after his election was invalidated.)	MDP	MDP
Seoul	Yangcheon B	O Gyeong-hun (Note: O Gyeong-hun was by-elected on 24 April 2003, to succeed Kim Yung-bae.)	GNP	GNP
Seoul	Gangseo A	Shin Ki-nam	MDP	Uri
Seoul	Gangseo B	Kim Seong-ho	MDP	Uri
Seoul	Guro A	Kim Ki-bae	GNP	Independent
Seoul	Guro B	Chang Young-shin (Note: Chang Young-shin was removed on 13 July 2001, after her election was invalidated.)	MDP	MDP
Seoul	Guro B	Lee Seung-chul (Note: Lee Seung-chul was by-elected on 25 October 2001, to succeed Chang Young-shin.)	GNP	GNP
Seoul	Geumcheon	Jang Sung-min (Note: Jang Sung-min was removed on 22 January 2002, after his election was invalidated.)	MDP	MDP
Seoul	Geumcheon	Lee Woo-jae (Note: Lee Woo-jae was by-elected on 8 August 2002, to succeed Jang Sung-min.)	GNP	Uri
Seoul	Yeongdeungpo A	Kim Myung-sup	MDP	Uri
Seoul	Yeongdeungpo B	Kim Min-seok (Note: Kim Min-seok was removed on 27 May 2002, after his election was invalidated.)	MDP	MDP
Seoul	Yeongdeungpo B	Kwon Young-se (Note: Kwon Young-se was by-elected on 8 August 2002, to succeed Kim Min-seok.)	GNP	GNP
Seoul	Dongjak A	Suh Chung-won	GNP	Independent
Seoul	Dongjak B	Yoo Yong-tae	MDP	MDP
Seoul	Gwanak A	Lee Hoon-pyung	MDP	MDP
Seoul	Gwanak B	Lee Hae-chan	MDP	Uri
Seoul	Seocho A	Park Won-hong	GNP	Independent
Seoul	Seocho B	Kim Deog-ryong	GNP	GNP
Seoul	Gangnam A	Choe Byung-yul	GNP	GNP
Seoul	Gangnam B	Oh Se-hoon	GNP	GNP
Seoul	Songpa A	Maeng Hyung-kyu	GNP	GNP
Seoul	Songpa B	Kim Sung-soon	MDP	MDP
Seoul	Gangdong A	Lee Bu-young	GNP	Uri
Seoul	Gangdong B	Shim Jae-kwon	MDP	MDP
Busan	Jung–Dong	Chung Ui-hwa	GNP	GNP
Busan	Seo	Chung Moon-hwa	GNP	GNP
Busan	Yeongdo	Kim Hyong-o	GNP	GNP
Busan	Busanjin A	Chung Jey-moon (Note: Chung Jey-moon was removed on 28 June 2002, after his election was invalidated.)	GNP	GNP
Busan	Busanjin A	Kim Byung-ho (Note: Kim Byung-ho was by-elected on 8 August 2002, to succeed Chung Jey-moon.)	GNP	GNP
Busan	Busanjin B	Do Jong-yee	GNP	GNP
Busan	Dongrae	Park Kwan-yong	GNP	Independent
Busan	Nam	Kim Moo-sung	GNP	GNP
Busan	Buk–Gangseo A	Chung Hyung-keun	GNP	GNP
Busan	Buk–Gangseo B	Huh Tae-yeol	GNP	GNP
Busan	Haeundae–Gijang A	Shon Tae-in (Note: Shon Tae-in died on 5 January 2002.)	GNP	GNP
Busan	Haeundae–Gijang A	Suh Byung-soo (Note: Suh Byung-soo was by-elected on 8 August 2002, to succeed Shon Tae-in.)	GNP	GNP
Busan	Haeundae–Gijang B	An Kyung-ryul	GNP	GNP
Busan	Saha A	Eom Ho-sung	GNP	GNP
Busan	Saha B	Park Chong-ung	GNP	Independent
Busan	Geumjeong	Kim Jin-jae	GNP	GNP
Busan	Yeonje	Kwon Tae-mang	GNP	Independent
Busan	Suyeong	Yoo Heung-soo	GNP	GNP
Busan	Sasang	Kwon Chul-hyun	GNP	GNP
Daegu	Jung	Baek Seung-hong	GNP	Independent
Daegu	Dong	Kang Shin-sung-yill	GNP	GNP
Daegu	Seo	Kang Jae-sup	GNP	GNP
Daegu	Nam	Hyun Sung-il	GNP	GNP
Daegu	Buk A	Park Sung-kook	GNP	Uri
Daegu	Buk B	Ahn Taek-soo	GNP	GNP
Daegu	Suseong A	Kim Mahn-je	GNP	GNP
Daegu	Suseong B	Yun Young-tak	GNP	GNP
Daegu	Dalseo A	Park Jong-keun	GNP	GNP
Daegu	Dalseo B	Lee Hae-bong	GNP	GNP
Daegu	Dalseong	Park Geun-hye	GNP	GNP
Incheon	Jung–Dong–Ongjin	Suh Sang-suhp	GNP	GNP
Incheon	Nam A	Min Bong-gi	GNP	Independent
Incheon	Nam B	Ahn Young-keun	GNP	Uri
Incheon	Yeonsu	Hwang Woo-yea	GNP	GNP
Incheon	Namdong A	Lee Yoon-sung	GNP	GNP
Incheon	Namdong B	Lee Ho-woong	MDP	Uri
Incheon	Bupyeong A	Park Sang-kyu	MDP	GNP
Incheon	Bupyeong B	Choi Yong-gyu	MDP	Uri
Incheon	Gyeyang	Song Young-gil	MDP	Uri
Incheon	Seo–Ganghwa A	Cho Han-chun	MDP	MDP
Incheon	Seo–Ganghwa B	Park Yong-ho (Note: Park Yong-ho was removed on 14 June 2002, after his election was invalidated.)	MDP	MDP
Incheon	Seo–Ganghwa B	Lee Kyeong-jae (Note: Lee Kyeong-jae was by-elected on 8 August 2002, to succeed Park Yong-ho.)	GNP	GNP
Gwangju	Dong	Kim Kyung-cheon	MDP	MDP
Gwangju	Seo	Chung Dong-chae	MDP	Uri
Gwangju	Nam	Kang Woon-tae	Independent	MDP
Gwangju	Buk A	Park Kwang-tae (Note: Park Kwang-tae resigned on 29 May 2002, to run in the 2002 Gwangju mayoral election.)	MDP	MDP
Gwangju	Buk A	Kim Song-hyum (Note: Kim Song-hyum was by-elected on 8 August 2002, to succeed Park Kwang-tae.)	MDP	MDP
Gwangju	Buk B	Kim Tae-hong	MDP	Uri
Gwangju	Gwangsan	Jeon Kab-kil	MDP	MDP
Daejeon	Dong	Lee Yang-hee	ULD	GNP
Daejeon	Jung	Kang Chang-hee	ULD	GNP
Daejeon	Seo A	Park Byeong-seug	MDP	Uri
Daejeon	Seo B	Lee Jae-sun	ULD	GNP
Daejeon	Yuseong	Song Sok-chan	MDP	Uri
Daejeon	Daedeok	Kim Won-wung	GNP	Uri
Ulsan	Jung	Kim Tae-ho (Note: Kim Tae-ho died on 10 July 2002.)	GNP	GNP
Ulsan	Jung	Jeong Kab-yoon (Note: Jeong Kab-yoon was by-elected on 19 December 2002, to succeed Kim Tae-ho.)	GNP	GNP
Ulsan	Nam	Choi Byung-gook	GNP	GNP
Ulsan	Dong	Chung Mong-joon	Independent	NI21
Ulsan	Buk	Yoon Doo-hwan	GNP	GNP
Ulsan	Ulju	Kwon Ki-sool	GNP	GNP
Gyeonggi Province	Jangan, Suwon	Park Jong-hee	GNP	GNP
Gyeonggi Province	Gwonseon, Suwon	Shin Hyun-tae	GNP	GNP
Gyeonggi Province	Paldal, Suwon	Nam Kyung-pil	GNP	GNP
Gyeonggi Province	Sujeong, Seongnam	Lee Yoon-soo	MDP	MDP
Gyeonggi Province	Jungwon, Seongnam	Cho Sung-joon	MDP	Uri
Gyeonggi Province	Bundang A, Seongnam	Ko Heung-kil	GNP	GNP
Gyeonggi Province	Bundang B, Seongnam	Yim Tae-hee	GNP	GNP
Gyeonggi Province	Uijeongbu	Moon Hee-sang (Note: Moon Hee-sang resigned on 7 March 2003, upon being appointed as Chief of Staff to the President.)	MDP	MDP
Gyeonggi Province	Uijeongbu	Hong Moon-jong (Note: Hong Moon-jong was by-elected on 24 April 2003, to succeed Moon Hee-sang.)	GNP	GNP
Gyeonggi Province	Manan, Anyang	Lee Jong-kul	MDP	Uri
Gyeonggi Province	Dongan, Anyang	Shim Jae-chul	GNP	GNP
Gyeonggi Province	Wonmi A, Bucheon	An Dong-seon	MDP	MDP
Gyeonggi Province	Wonmi B, Bucheon	Bae Ki-sun	MDP	Uri
Gyeonggi Province	Sosa, Bucheon	Kim Moon-soo	GNP	GNP
Gyeonggi Province	Ojeong, Bucheon	Choi Seon-young	MDP	MDP
Gyeonggi Province	Gwangmyeong	Sohn Hak-kyu (Note: Sohn Hak-kyu resigned on 27 May 2002, to run in the 2002 Gyeonggi gubernatorial election.)	GNP	GNP
Gyeonggi Province	Gwangmyeong	Jeon Jae-hee (Note: Jeon Jae-hee was by-elected on 8 August 2002, to succeed Sohn Hak-kyu.)	GNP	GNP
Gyeonggi Province	Pyeongtaek A	Won Yoo-chul	MDP	GNP
Gyeonggi Province	Pyeongtaek B	Jung Jang-seon	MDP	Uri
Gyeonggi Province	Dongducheon–Yangju	Mok Yo-sang	GNP	GNP
Gyeonggi Province	Ansan A	Kim Young-hwan	MDP	MDP
Gyeonggi Province	Ansan B	Chun Jung-bae	MDP	Uri
Gyeonggi Province	Deokyang A, Goyang	Kwack Chi-young (Note: Kwack Chi-young was removed on 26 November 2002, after his election was invalidated.)	MDP	MDP
Gyeonggi Province	Deokyang A, Goyang	Rhyu Si-min (Note: Rhyu Si-min was by-elected on 24 April 2003, to succeed Kwack Chi-young.)	PPR	Uri
Gyeonggi Province	Deokyang B, Goyang	Lee Keun-jin	MDP	GNP
Gyeonggi Province	Ilsan A, Goyang	Jong Bum-goo	MDP	Independent
Gyeonggi Province	Ilsan B, Goyang	Kim Deok-bae	MDP	Uri
Gyeonggi Province	Gwacheon–Uiwang	Ahn Sang-soo	GNP	GNP
Gyeonggi Province	Guri	Jun Yong-won	GNP	GNP
Gyeonggi Province	Namyangju	Cho Jung-moo	GNP	GNP
Gyeonggi Province	Osan–Hwaseong	Kang Sung-koo	MDP	GNP
Gyeonggi Province	Siheung	Park Byung-yoon	MDP	MDP
Gyeonggi Province	Gunpo	Kim Boo-kyum	GNP	Uri
Gyeonggi Province	Hanam	You Sung-keun (Note: You Sung-keun was removed on 24 May 2002, after his election was invalidated.)	GNP	GNP
Gyeonggi Province	Hanam	Kim Hwang-sik (Note: Kim Hwang-sik was by-elected on 8 August 2002, to succeed You Sung-keun.)	GNP	Independent
Gyeonggi Province	Paju	Lee Jai-chang	GNP	GNP
Gyeonggi Province	Icheon	Lee Hee-kyu	MDP	MDP
Gyeonggi Province	Yongin A	Namgoong Seuk	MDP	Uri
Gyeonggi Province	Yongin B	Kim Yun-seek	MDP	GNP
Gyeonggi Province	Anseong	Sim Kyu-sub (Note: Sim Kyu-sub died on 27 January 2002.)	MDP	MDP
Gyeonggi Province	Anseong	Lee Hae-koo (Note: Lee Hae-koo was by-elected on 8 August 2002, to succeed Sim Kyu-sub.)	GNP	GNP
Gyeonggi Province	Gimpo	Park Chong-woo	MDP	MDP
Gyeonggi Province	Yeoju	Rhee Q-taek	GNP	GNP
Gyeonggi Province	Gwangju County	Park Hyuk-kyu	GNP	GNP
Gyeonggi Province	Yeoncheon–Pocheon	Lee Han-dong	ULD	ULD
Gyeonggi Province	Gapyeong–Yangpyeong	Choung Byoung-gug	GNP	GNP
Gangwon Province	Chuncheon	Han Seung-soo	DPP	GNP
Gangwon Province	Wonju	Lee Chang-bok	MDP	Uri
Gangwon Province	Gangneung	Choi Don-woung (Note: Choi Don-woung resigned on 3 September 2001, but returned by being by-elected on 25 October 2001.)	GNP	GNP
Gangwon Province	Donghae–Samcheok	Choi Yeon-hee	GNP	GNP
Gangwon Province	Taebaek–Jeongseon	Kim Taek-kee	MDP	Uri
Gangwon Province	Sokcho–Goseong–Yangyang–Inje	Song Hun-suk	MDP	MDP
Gangwon Province	Hongcheon–Hoengseong	Yu Jae-kyu	MDP	MDP
Gangwon Province	Yeongwol–Pyeongchang	Kim Yong-hak	GNP	GNP
Gangwon Province	Cheolwon–Hwacheon–Yanggu	Lee Yong-sam	MDP	MDP
North Chungcheong Province	Sangdang, Cheongju	Hong Jae-hyong	MDP	Uri
North Chungcheong Province	Heungdeok, Cheongju	Yoon Kyeong-sig	GNP	GNP
North Chungcheong Province	Chungju	Lee Won-sung	MDP	Uri
North Chungcheong Province	Jecheon–Danyang	Song Kwang-ho	ULD	GNP
North Chungcheong Province	Cheongwon	Shin Kyung-shik	GNP	GNP
North Chungcheong Province	Boeun–Okcheon–Yeongdong	Shim Kyu-cheol	GNP	GNP
North Chungcheong Province	Jincheon–Gwisan–Eumseong	Chung Woo-taik	ULD	Independent
South Chungcheong Province	Cheonan A	Jeon Yong-hak	MDP	GNP
South Chungcheong Province	Cheonan B	Ham Suk-jae	ULD	GNP
South Chungcheong Province	Gongju–Yeongi	Chung Jin-suk	ULD	ULD
South Chungcheong Province	Boryeong–Seocheon	Kim Yong-hwan	NKPH	GNP
South Chungcheong Province	Asan	Won Churll-hee	ULD	ULD
South Chungcheong Province	Seosan–Taean	Moon Seok-ho	MDP	Uri
South Chungcheong Province	Nonsan–Geumsan	Rhee In-je	MDP	ULD
South Chungcheong Province	Buyeo	Kim Hak-won	ULD	ULD
South Chungcheong Province	Cheongyang–Hongseong	Lee One-ku	ULD	GNP
South Chungcheong Province	Yesan	Oh Jang-seop	ULD	Independent
South Chungcheong Province	Dangjin	Song Young-jin	MDP	Independent
North Jeolla Province	Wansan, Jeonju	Chang Young-dal	MDP	Uri
North Jeolla Province	Deokjin, Jeonju	Chung Dong-young	MDP	Uri
North Jeolla Province	Gunsan	Kang Hyun-wook (Note: Kang Hyun-wook resigned on 27 May 2002, to run in the 2002 North Jeolla gubernatorial election.)	MDP	MDP
North Jeolla Province	Gunsan	Kang Bong-kyun (Note: Kang Bong-kyun was by-elected on 8 August 2002, to succeed Kang Hyun-wook.)	MDP	Uri
North Jeolla Province	Iksan	Lee Hyup	MDP	MDP
North Jeolla Province	Jeongeup	Kim Won-ki	MDP	Uri
North Jeolla Province	Namwon–Sunchang	Lee Kang-rae	Independent	Uri
North Jeolla Province	Gimje	Chang Sung-won	MDP	MDP
North Jeolla Province	Wanju–Imsil	Kim Tai-shik	MDP	MDP
North Jeolla Province	Jinan–Muju–Jangsu	Chung Sye-kyun	MDP	Uri
North Jeolla Province	Gochang–Buan	Chung Kyun-hwan	MDP	MDP
South Jeolla Province	Mokpo	Kim Hong-il	MDP	MDP
South Jeolla Province	Yeosu	Kim Choong-joh	MDP	MDP
South Jeolla Province	Suncheon	Kim Kyung-jae	MDP	MDP
South Jeolla Province	Naju	Bae Ki-woon	MDP	MDP
South Jeolla Province	Gwangyang–Gurye	Chung Chul-ki	MDP	MDP
South Jeolla Province	Damyang–Gokseong–Jangseong	Kim Hyo-seuk	MDP	MDP
South Jeolla Province	Goheung	Park Sang-cheon	MDP	MDP
South Jeolla Province	Boseong–Hwasun	Park Joo-sun	Independent	Independent
South Jeolla Province	Jangheung–Yeongam	Kim Ok-doo	MDP	MDP
South Jeolla Province	Gangjin–Wando	Chun Yong-taek	MDP	Uri
South Jeolla Province	Haenam–Jindo	Lee Jung-il	Independent	MDP
South Jeolla Province	Muan–Sinan	Hahn Hwa-kap	MDP	MDP
South Jeolla Province	Hampyeong–Yeonggwang	Lee Nak-yon	MDP	MDP
North Gyeongsang Province	Buk, Pohang	Lee Byung-suk	GNP	GNP
North Gyeongsang Province	Nam, Pohang–Ulleung	Lee Sang-deuk	GNP	GNP
North Gyeongsang Province	Gyeongju	Kim Il-yun	GNP	Independent
North Gyeongsang Province	Gimcheon	Rim In-bae	GNP	GNP
North Gyeongsang Province	Andong	Kwon Oh-eul	GNP	GNP
North Gyeongsang Province	Gumi	Kim Seong-jo	GNP	GNP
North Gyeongsang Province	Yeongju	Park Si-kyun	GNP	Independent
North Gyeongsang Province	Yeongcheon	Park Heon-ki	GNP	GNP
North Gyeongsang Province	Sangju	Lee Sang-bae	GNP	GNP
North Gyeongsang Province	Mungyeong–Yecheon	Shin Yung-kook	GNP	GNP
North Gyeongsang Province	Gyeongsan–Cheongdo	Park Jae-wook	GNP	GNP
North Gyeongsang Province	Goryeong–Seongju	Choo Jin-woo	GNP	GNP
North Gyeongsang Province	Gunwi–Uiseong	Chung Chang-wha	GNP	GNP
North Gyeongsang Province	Chilgok	Lee In-ki	GNP	GNP
North Gyeongsang Province	Cheongsong–Yongyang–Yeongdeok	Kim Chan-woo	GNP	GNP
North Gyeongsang Province	Bonghwa–Uljin	Kim Kwang-won	GNP	GNP
South Gyeongsang Province	Changwon A	Kim Jong-ha	GNP	GNP
South Gyeongsang Province	Changwon B	Lee Ju-young	GNP	GNP
South Gyeongsang Province	Hampo, Masan	Kim Ho-il (Note: Kim Ho-il was removed on 21 February 2002, after his election was invalidated.)	GNP	GNP
South Gyeongsang Province	Hampo, Masan	Kim Jung-boo (Note: Kim Jung-boo was by-elected on 8 August 2002, to succeed Kim Ho-il.)	GNP	GNP
South Gyeongsang Province	Hoewon, Masan	Kang Sam-jae	GNP	GNP
South Gyeongsang Province	Jinju	Ha Soon-bong	GNP	Independent
South Gyeongsang Province	Jinhae	Kim Hak-song	GNP	GNP
South Gyeongsang Province	Tongyeong–Goseong	Kim Dong-wook	GNP	GNP
South Gyeongsang Province	Sacheon	Lee Bang-ho	GNP	GNP
South Gyeongsang Province	Gimhae	Kim Young-iel	GNP	GNP
South Gyeongsang Province	Milyang–Changnyeong	Kim Yong-kap	GNP	GNP
South Gyeongsang Province	Geoje	Kim Ki-choon	GNP	GNP
South Gyeongsang Province	Yangsan	Lah Oh-yeon	GNP	Independent
South Gyeongsang Province	Uiryeong–Haman	Yun Han-doo	GNP	GNP
South Gyeongsang Province	Namhae–Hadong	Park Hee-tae	GNP	GNP
South Gyeongsang Province	Sancheong–Hapcheon	Kim Yong-kyun	GNP	GNP
South Gyeongsang Province	Hamyang–Geochang	Lee Kang-too	GNP	GNP
Jeju Province	Jeju City	Hyun Kyung-dae	GNP	GNP
Jeju Province	Bukjeju	Jang Jung-un (Note: Jang Jung-un was removed on 28 June 2002, after his election was invalidated.)	MDP	MDP
Jeju Province	Bukjeju	Yang Jung-kyu (Note: Yang Jung-kyu was by-elected on 8 August 2002, to succeed Jang Jung-un.)	GNP	GNP
Jeju Province	Seogwipo–Namjeju	Ko Jin-boo	MDP	MDP
National	Proportional representation	Lee Hoi-chang (Note: Lee Hoi-chang resigned on 26 November 2002, to run in the 2002 South Korean presidential election.)	GNP	GNP
National	Proportional representation	Hong Sa-duk	GNP	GNP
National	Proportional representation	Lee Yun-sook	GNP	GNP
National	Proportional representation	Kang Chang-sung	GNP	GNP
National	Proportional representation	Shin Young-kyun	GNP	GNP
National	Proportional representation	Suh Chung-hwa	GNP	GNP
National	Proportional representation	Rhee Shang-hi (Note: Rhee Shang-hi was removed on 1 February 2004.)	GNP	GNP
National	Proportional representation	Park Se-hawn	GNP	GNP
National	Proportional representation	Jeon Jae-hee (Note: Jeon Jae-hee resigned on 22 July 2002, to run in the 2002 Gwangmyeong, Gyeonggi Province by-election.)	GNP	GNP
National	Proportional representation	Cho Woong-kyu (Note: Cho Woong-kyu was removed on 25 March 2004.)	GNP	GNP
National	Proportional representation	Yoon Yeo-joon	GNP	GNP
National	Proportional representation	Lee Hahn-koo	GNP	GNP
National	Proportional representation	Kim Jung-sook	GNP	GNP
National	Proportional representation	Kim Rak-ki	GNP	GNP
National	Proportional representation	Park Chang-dal	GNP	GNP
National	Proportional representation	Kim Hong-shin (Note: Kim Hong-shin was removed on 9 December 2003.)	GNP	GNP
National	Proportional representation	Lee Won-chang	GNP	GNP
National	Proportional representation	Hwang Seung-min (Note: Hwang Seung-min died on 6 February 2003.)	GNP	GNP
National	Proportional representation	Lim Jin-chool (Note: Lim Jin-chool was removed on 29 March 2004.)	GNP	GNP
National	Proportional representation	Lee Won-hyung	GNP	GNP
National	Proportional representation	Son Hi-jung	GNP	GNP
National	Proportional representation	Kim Young-sun (Note: Kim Young-sun took office on 22 July 2002, to succeed Jeon Jae-hee.)	GNP	GNP
National	Proportional representation	Yoo Han-yul (Note: Yoo Han-yul took office on 26 November 2002, to succeed Lee Hoi-chang.)	GNP	GNP
National	Proportional representation	Jang Kwang-keun (Note: Jang Kwang-keun took office on 6 February 2003, to succeed Hwang Seung-min.)	GNP	GNP
National	Proportional representation	Song Byeong-dae (Note: Song Byeong-dae took office on 9 December 2003, to succeed Kim Hong-shin.)	GNP	GNP
National	Proportional representation	Kim Young-gu (Note: Kim Young-gu took office on 1 February 2004, to succeed Rhee Shang-hi.)	GNP	GNP
National	Proportional representation	Park Kyung-sub (Note: Park Kyung-sub took office on 25 March 2004, to succeed Cho Woong-kyu.)	GNP	GNP
National	Proportional representation	Lee Man-jae (Note: Lee Man-jae took office on 29 March 2004, to succeed Lim Jin-chool.)	GNP	GNP
National	Proportional representation	Suh Young-hoon (Note: Suh Young-hoon was removed on 28 December 2000.)	MDP	MDP
National	Proportional representation	Choi Young-hee	MDP	MDP
National	Proportional representation	Jang Tae-wan	MDP	MDP
National	Proportional representation	Lee Man-sup	MDP	MDP
National	Proportional representation	Han Myeong-sook (Note: Han Myeong-sook resigned on 28 January 2001, upon being appointed as Minister of Gender Equality.)	MDP	MDP
National	Proportional representation	Kim Un-yong	MDP	MDP
National	Proportional representation	Park In-sang (Note: Park In-sang was removed on 31 March 2004.)	MDP	MDP
National	Proportional representation	Lee Mi-kyung (Note: Lee Mi-kyung was removed on 21 October 2003.)	MDP	MDP
National	Proportional representation	Park Sang-hee	MDP	MDP
National	Proportional representation	Lee Jae-joung (Note: Lee Jae-joung was removed on 21 October 2003.)	MDP	MDP
National	Proportional representation	Huh Un-na (Note: Huh Un-na was removed on 21 October 2003.)	MDP	MDP
National	Proportional representation	Choi Jae-seung	MDP	MDP
National	Proportional representation	Kim Han-gil (Note: Kim Han-gil resigned on 20 September 2000, upon being appointed as Ministry of Culture and Tourism.)	MDP	MDP
National	Proportional representation	Kim Bang-rim	MDP	MDP
National	Proportional representation	Kim Ki-jai	MDP	MDP
National	Proportional representation	Kim Young-jin (Note: Kim Young-jin resigned on 4 March 2003, upon being appointed as Minister of Agriculture.)	MDP	MDP
National	Proportional representation	Yoon Chul-sang	MDP	MDP
National	Proportional representation	Cho Jae-hwan	MDP	MDP
National	Proportional representation	Yu Sam-nam (Note: Yu Sam-nam resigned on 7 September 2001, upon being appointed as Minister of Oceans and Fisheries.)	MDP	MDP
National	Proportional representation	Kim Hwa-joong (Note: Kim Hwa-joong took office on 20 September 2000, to succeed Kim Han-gil, but resigned on 4 March 2003, upon being appointed as Minister of Health and Welfare.)	MDP	MDP
National	Proportional representation	Choi Myun-hun (Note: Choi Myun-hun took office on 28 December 2000, to succeed Suh Young-hoon.)	MDP	MDP
National	Proportional representation	Park Yang-soo (Note: Park Yang-soo took office on 28 January 2001, to succeed Han Myeong-sook, but was removed on 21 October 2003.)	MDP	MDP
National	Proportional representation	Cho Bae-sook (Note: Cho Bae-sook took office on 7 September 2001, to succeed Yu Sam-nam, but was removed on 12 December 2003.)	MDP	MDP
National	Proportional representation	Koo Jong-tae (Note: Koo Jong-tae took office on 4 March 2003, to succeed Kim Hwa-joong.)	MDP	MDP
National	Proportional representation	Oh Young-sik (Note: Oh Young-sik took office on 4 March 2003, to succeed Kim Young-jin, but was removed on 21 October 2003.)	MDP	MDP
National	Proportional representation	An Sang-hyun (Note: An Sang-hyun took office on 21 October 2003, to succeed Lee Mi-kyung.)	MDP	MDP
National	Proportional representation	Hwang Chang-joo (Note: Hwang Chang-joo took office on 21 October 2003, to succeed Lee Jae-joung.)	MDP	MDP
National	Proportional representation	Park Jeong-when (Note: Park Jeong-when took office on 21 October 2003, to succeed Huh Un-na, but was removed on 21 May 2004.)	MDP	MDP
National	Proportional representation	Han Chung-su (Note: Han Chung-su took office on 21 October 2003, to succeed Park Yang-soo.)	MDP	MDP
National	Proportional representation	Yang Seung-boo (Note: Yang Seung-boo took office on 21 October 2003, to succeed Oh Young-sik.)	MDP	MDP
National	Proportional representation	Park Kum-ja (Note: Park Kum-ja took office on 12 December 2003, to succeed Cho Bae-sook.)	MDP	MDP
National	Proportional representation	Lee Jong-sung (Note: Lee Jong-sung took office on 31 March 2004, to succeed Park In-sang.)	MDP	MDP
National	Proportional representation	An Hi-ok (Note: An Hi-ok took office on 21 May 2004, to succeed Park Jeong-when.)	MDP	MDP
National	Proportional representation	Kim Jong-pil	ULD	ULD
National	Proportional representation	Cho Hee-wook	ULD	ULD
National	Proportional representation	Kim Chong-hoh (Note: Kim Chong-hoh was removed on 22 March 2004.)	ULD	ULD
National	Proportional representation	Cho Boo-young	ULD	ULD
National	Proportional representation	Ahn Dae-ryun	ULD	ULD
National	Proportional representation	Byun Ung-jun (Note: Byun Ung-jun took office on 22 March 2004, to succeed Kim Chong-hoh.)	ULD	ULD
National	Proportional representation	Kang Sook-ja	DPP	Independent
