= Legislative elections in South Korea =

The composition of the National Assembly of South Korea is determined by elections every four years.

Any South Korean citizen over the age of 18 is eligible to stand for election. And, under the terms of the Public Official Election Act, the active electoral right, that is, the right to vote is vested in every South Korean citizen who has reached the age of 18. There are certain restrictions, which are mostly the same for both the active and passive electoral rights. The only difference is that to be eligible to stand for election, a person who has been convicted of a crime must have their convictions expunged.

== Procedure ==
Since the promulgation of the March 1988 electoral law, the assembly has been elected every four years through a Supplementary Member system, meaning that some of the members are elected from constituencies according to the system of first past the post, while others are elected at a national level through proportional representation.

In 2001, the Constitutional Court held that allocation of seats for the ‘party’ legislators under the mixed-member proportional representation system was unconstitutional as it distorted democratic will. The impugned electoral system was considered to have perpetuated the ‘oligopoly of political parties, and hinder[ed] a new party from making its appearance in the National Assembly’. As a result, the Court required the National Assembly to introduce electoral reform and allow each voter to have two votes since 2004.

As of 2016, 253 members represent constituencies, while 47 were elected from PR lists. In contrast to elections to the Assembly, presidential elections occur once every five years, and this has led to frequent situations of minority government and legislative deadlock.

=== Election campaign ===
The election campaign period, as set by the Election Law, is short – 14 days. According to the book Internet Election Campaigns in the United States, Japan, South Korea, and Taiwan, the election campaign periods in Korea (23 days for presidential elections and 14 days for National Assembly elections) were made intentionally short in order to "prevent excessive campaign spending for long-running election campaigns and harmful effects from overheated elections", but, on the downside, "this works against new candidates who are not well known".

== Summary of past legislative elections ==
- 1946 South Korean legislative election

=== National Assembly elections ===
1. 1948 South Korean Constitutional Assembly election
2. 1950 South Korean legislative election
3. 1954 South Korean legislative election
4. 1958 South Korean legislative election
5. 1960 South Korean legislative election
6. 1963 South Korean legislative election
7. 1967 South Korean legislative election
8. 1971 South Korean legislative election
9. 1973 South Korean legislative election
10. 1976 South Korean legislative election
11. 1978 South Korean legislative election
12. 1981 South Korean legislative election
13. 1985 South Korean legislative election
14. 1988 South Korean legislative election

Winning party: Conservative · Liberal

1946 – 1948 – 1950 – 1954 – 1958 – 1960 – 1963 – 1967 – 1971 – 1973 – 1978 – 1981 – 1985 – 1988

#	Year	First party	Seat composition	Popular vote	Parties (in order of seats)
14	1992	Democratic Liberal			Democratic Liberal (149); Democratic (97); United People's (31); New Political (1); Independents (21)
15	1996	New Korea			New Korea (139); National Congress (79); United Liberal Democrats (50); United Democratic (15); Independents (5)
16	2000	Grand National			Grand National (133); Millennium Democratic (115); United Liberal Democrats (17); Democratic People's (2); New Korea (1); Independents (5)
17	2004	Uri			Uri (152); Grand National (121); Democratic Labor (10); Millennium Democratic (9); United Liberal Democrats (4); National Alliance 21 (1); Independents (2)
18	2008	Grand National			Grand National (153); United Democratic (81); Liberty Forward (18); Pro-Park (14); Democratic Labor (5); Creative Korea (3); Independents (25)
19	2012	Saenuri			Saenuri (152); Democratic United (127); Unified Progressive (13); Liberty Forward (5); Independents (3)
20	2016	Democratic			Democratic (123); Saenuri (122); People (38); Justice (6); Independents (11)
21	2020	Democratic/ Platform			Democratic/Platform (180); United Future/Future Korea (103); Justice (6); People (3); Open Democratic (3); Independents (5)
22	2024	Democratic/ Democratic Alliance			Democratic/Democratic Alliance (176); People Power/People Future (108); Rebuilding Korea (12); New Reform (3); New Future (1)

== See also ==
- Elections in South Korea
