= Jang Tae-wan =

South Korean general (1931–2010)

- 장태완

Personal details
- Born: 13 September 1931 Korea, Empire of Japan
- Died: 26 July 2010 (aged 79) South Korea
- Party: Independent
- Other political affiliations: Democratic (2000–2004)

Military service
- Allegiance: South Korea
- Branch/service: Republic of Korea Army
- Rank: Major General
- Commands: Capital Garrison Command

Korean name
- Hangul: 장태완
- Hanja: 張泰玩
- RR: Jang Taewan
- MR: Chang T'aewan

Jang Tae-wan (Korean: 장태완; Hanja: 張泰玩, 13 September 1931 – 26 July 2010) was an army general and politician of South Korea.

== Military career ==
Jang was the commander of the Capital Garrison Command (now Capital Defense Command) during the Coup d'état of December Twelfth. The Hanahoe, the group of South Korean military officers who were the instigators of the coup d'état, tried to appease Jang. However, the staunch Jang rejected it. Instead, Jang cursed and swore at them strongly, "You god damn rebels! Do not move and stay there! I will drive a tank right now and blow your heads away!"(Korean: 야, 이 반란군 놈의 새끼들아. 너희들 거기 꼼짝말고 있어. 내가 지금 전차를 몰고가서 네 놈들의 머리통을 다날려버리겠어!), and fought against the rebel troops. However he was defeated, being betrayed by his subordinates.

Jang was imprisoned under de facto house arrest and tortured for the next six months. While his son, a student of Korea's Top Ranked Seoul National University, died in January 1982 under suspicious circumstances and was reputedly murdered by government agents; Jang's father starved himself to death.

In 1982, he served as the President of Korea Securities & Computer Corporation (Koscom), and in 1994, he was elected as President of Korean Veterans Association in a free election and led the veterans' association for six years.

== Political career ==
He entered politics in March 2000 by joining the Democratic Party, and in the same year, he served as a member of the 16th National Assembly for Proportional Representation constituency as a Standing Advisor and Party Affairs Committee member. Later, he served as a member of the ruling party's leadership, and in 2002, he served as a special adviser to presidential candidate Roh Moo-hyun.

Jang Tae-Wan died of lung cancer on July 26, 2010 at the age of 78 and was buried with full honors in the Generals' section of Daejeon National Cemetery. Many Korean people value him as a symbol of a true soldier, who had stood against coup d´état.

== In popular culture ==
The 2023 South Korean movie 12.12: The Day features Lee Tae-shin, a fictional commander modeled after Jang Tae-wan, who fights against the coup attempt in 1979.

== Election results ==
Year	Elections	Constituency	Political party	Votes (%)	Results
2000	16th National Assembly General Election	Proportional representation (3rd)	MDP	6,780,625 (35.87%)	Elected

== See also ==
- Chun Doo-hwan
- Roh Tae-woo
- Jeong Seung-hwa
