= Kim Young-jin (politician, born 1947) =

South Korean activist and politician

- 김영진

Member of the National Assembly
- In office 30 May 2008 – 29 May 2012
- Constituency: Seo B (Gwangju)

Minister of Agriculture and Forestry
- In office 27 February 2003 – 21 July 2003
- President: Roh Moo-hyun
- Prime Minister: Goh Kun
- Preceded by: Kim Dong-tae
- Succeeded by: Heo Sang-man

Member of the National Assembly
- In office 30 May 2000 – 4 March 2003 (resigned)
- Constituency: Proportional
- In office 30 May 1996 – 29 May 2000
- Constituency: Gangjin–Wando (South Jeolla)
- In office 30 May 1992 – 29 May 1996
- Constituency: Gangjin–Wando (South Jeolla)
- In office 30 May 1988 – 29 May 1992
- Constituency: Gangjin–Wando (South Jeolla)

Personal details
- Born: November 17, 1947 (age 78) Gangjin, South Jeolla, United States Army Military Government in Korea
- Party: Independent (since 2012)
- Spouse: Yoon Soon-nam (died 2025)
- Children: 3

Korean name
- Hangul: 김영진
- Hanja: 金泳鎮
- RR: Gim Yeongjin
- MR: Kim Yŏngjin

Kim Young-jin (Korean: 김영진; Hanja: 金泳鎮, born 17 November 1947) is a South Korean activist and former politician. He was a five-term National Assembly member, and briefly served as the Minister of Agriculture in 2003.

== Early history ==
Kim was born in Gangjin, South Jeolla, United States Army Military Government in Korea on 17 November 1947, where he was raised by a family of farmers. He graduated from Gangjin Agricultural High School.

During the Fourth Republic of Korea, he was imprisoned for participating in anti-Yushin protests and the Gwangju Uprising.

== Political career ==
=== National Assembly (1988–2003) ===
Under the Sixth Republic of Korea, he was elected to the 13th, 14th, 15th, and 16th National Assembly.

In 1993, Kim traveled to Geneva, Switzerland with Cho Il-hyeon, where the two shaved their heads and attempted to lead a hunger strike on 9 December 1993 to protest the Uruguay Round negotiations to open up South Korea's rice market for the United States.

In 2001, Kim traveled to Tokyo, Japan and led a six-day hunger strike to protest the controversial revisionist changes within the New History Textbook, outside of the National Diet Building, from 11–16 April 2001. During this protest, Kim held a sign that read "nihon wa hansei shiru" (日本は反省しる), demanding Japan to reflect on their actions. However, this sign had a typo as shiru (しる) was meant to be shiro (しろ), which caused the typo to become an internet meme amongst 2channel users.

=== Minister of Agriculture and Forestry (2003) ===
In 2003, Kim resigned from his fourth term in the National Assembly, upon being appointed as the 53rd Minister of Agriculture and Forestry by President Roh Moo-hyun on 27 February 2003, where he was first tasked with handling a free trade agreement between Chile and South Korea. Later that year, Kim submitted his resignation on 21 July 2003 as a response to the Seoul Administrative Court halting the contentious Saemangeum Reclamation Project.

Kim would attempt to campaign for the 17th National Assembly in 2004, but was defeated by the Uri Party candidate Chung Dong-chae.

=== National Assembly (2008–2012) ===
Kim was re-elected to the 18th National Assembly in 2008. During his tenure, Kim played a key role in having the Gwangju Uprising added to UNESCO's Memory of the World Programme.

In 2012, Kim was eliminated from Democratic United Party nomination before the general election. Kim briefly considered running as an independent, criticizing the process, but refused to spoil the vote and retired from politics.

== Electoral history ==
Year	Elections	Constituency	Political party	No. of votes	%	Results
1988	13th National Assembly General Election	Gangjin–Wando (South Jeolla)	Peace Democratic Party	35,065	40.46%	Won
1992	14th National Assembly General Election	Gangjin–Wando (South Jeolla)	Democratic Party	33,685	45.70%	Won
1996	15th National Assembly General Election	Gangjin–Wando (South Jeolla)	National Congress for New Politics	33,765	51.48%	Won
2000	16th National Assembly General Election	Proportional	Millennium Democratic Party	6,780,359	35.87%	Won
2004	17th National Assembly General Election	Seo B (Gwangju)	Millennium Democratic Party	24,729	35.61%	Defeated
2008	18th National Assembly General Election	Seo B (Gwangju)	Unified Democratic Party	34,891	72.52%	Won

== Bibliography ==
- Operation Chungjeong and Gwangju Uprising (충정작전과 광주항쟁)
- Korean Agriculture's Diagnosis and Reform Tasks (한국농업의 진단과 개혁과제) ISBN 9788981630447
- May Sky (오월의 하늘) ISBN 9788959229321
- Dreams Blooming Amidst Adversity (역경 속에 핀 꿈) ISBN 9788965622390

== Personal life ==
Kim was married to Yoon Soon-nam. They had a son and two daughters together.

Kim is a follower of the Presbyterian Church in the Republic of Korea.
