= Cho Bae-sook =

South Korean politician (born 1956)

- 조배숙
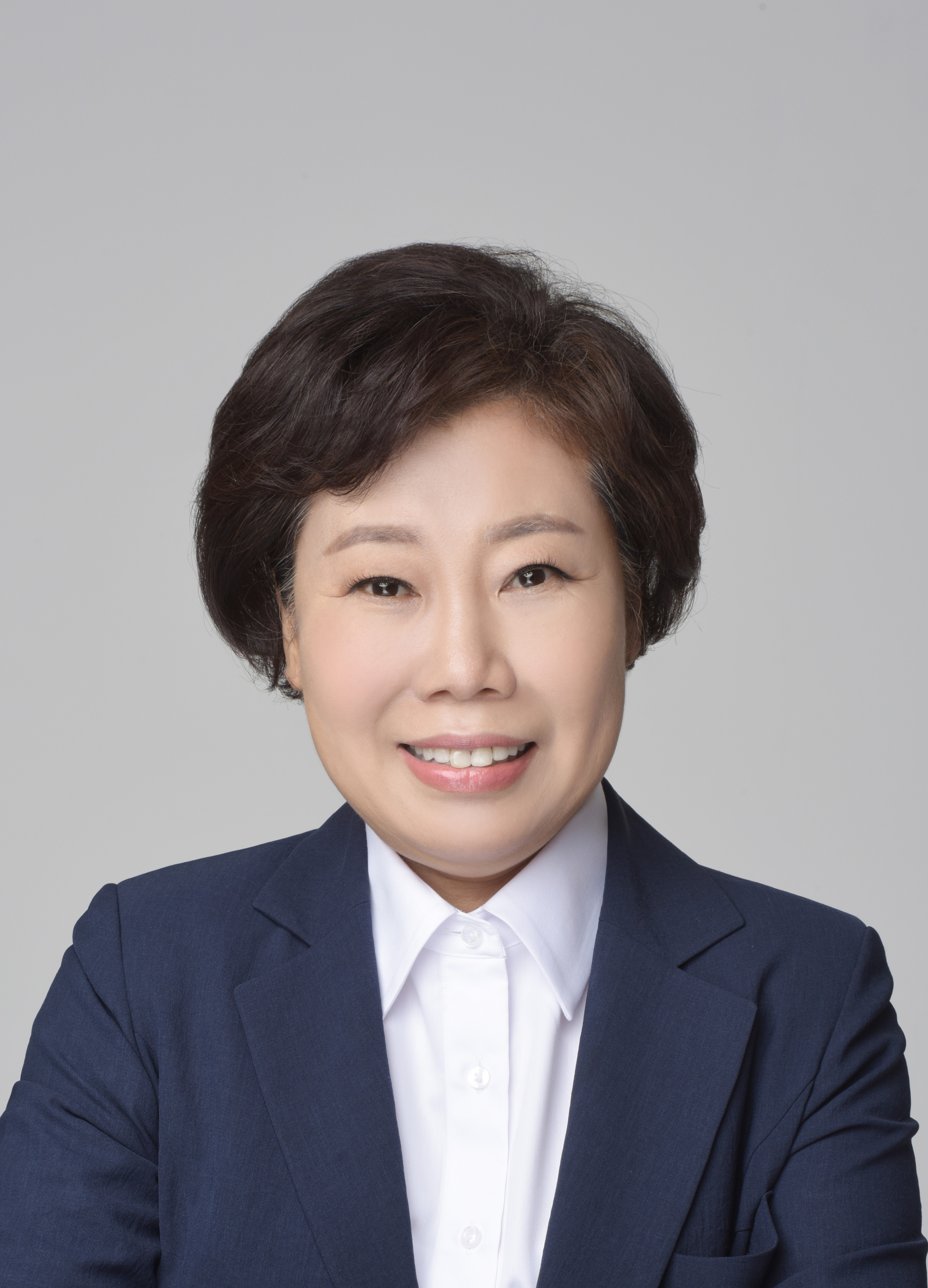

Leader of the Party for Democracy and Peace
- In office 6 February 2018 – 5 August 2018
- Preceded by: Party established
- Succeeded by: Chung Dong-young

Personal details
- Born: 10 September 1956 (age 70) Iksan, South Korea
- Party: People Power
- Education: Seoul National University

Cho Bae-sook (Korean: 조배숙; born 10 September 1956) is a South Korean politician and legislator, serving as the Chairwoman of the liberal Party for Democracy and Peace, a party that split from the People's Party following Ahn Cheol-soo's decision to merge with the Bareun Party to form the Bareunmirae Party. Cho is one of three women leading prominent South Korean liberal parties, along with Choo Mi-ae of the Minjoo Party and Lee Jeong-mi of the Justice Party.

== Biography ==
Cho studied at Seoul National University and received a Bachelor's and master's degree in law. She worked as a prosecutor and eventually served as a Judge in the Seoul District Court of Civil Affairs, and the Seoul Appellate Court. Cho was also elected to the National Assembly.

== Election results ==
=== General elections ===
Year	Elections	Constituency	Political party	Votes (%)	Results
2000	16th National Assembly General Election	Proportional representation (23rd)	MDP	6,780,359 (35.87%)	Not Elected→Elected
2004	17th National Assembly General Election	Iksan B (North Jeolla)	Uri	46,078 (66.82%)	Won
2008	18th National Assembly General Election	Iksan B (North Jeolla)	UDP	28,459 (54.91%)	Won
2012	19th National Assembly General Election	Iksan B (North Jeolla)	Independent	18,511 (28.35%)	Defeated (2nd)
2016	20th National Assembly General Election	Iksan B (North Jeolla)	People's	34,201 (46.10%)	Won
2020	21st National Assembly General Election	Iksan B (North Jeolla)	Minsaeng	12,302 (15.60%)	Defeated (2nd)
2024	22nd National Assembly General Election	Proportional representation (13rd)	PFP	10,395,264 (36.67%)	Elected

=== Local elections ===
==== Governor of North Jeolla ====
Year	Elections	Constituency	Political party	Votes (%)	Remarks
2022	8th Iocal Election	North Jeolla (Governoral Elections)	PPP	128,828 (17.88%)	Defeated (2nd)
