= 16th National Assembly =

16th National Assembly may refer to:

- 16th National Assembly of France
- 16th National Assembly of South Korea
