= Alliance of DJP =

1997–2001 political party in South Korea

Alliance of DJP DJP연합
- Abbreviation: DJP (unofficial)
- Leader: Kim Dae-jung
- Founded: 3 November 1997
- Dissolved: 3 September 2001
- Political position: Big tent
- Member parties: National Congress for New Politics (until 2000); Millennium Democratic Party (from 2000); United Liberal Democrats; Democratic People's Party (from 2001)

The Alliance of DJP (Korean: DJP연합) was a big tent political alliance formed by the National Congress for New Politics (NCNP) (Millennium Democratic Party since 2000) and the United Liberal Democrats (ULD). It was named after the initials of the Chairmen of both parties ― Kim Dae-jung (DJ) of the NCNP and Kim Jong-pil (JP) of the ULD. It is rarely called as Alliance of DJT (DJT연합) including Park Tae-joon (TJ) who also joined the alliance. In 2001, the Democratic People's Party (DPP) joined the Alliance.

== History ==
The alliance was formed after the NCNP's huge defeat during the general election in 1996, where the party only gained 76 out of 299 seats, and most of the seats were at Honam. Since the general election was around 1 year before the presidential election, Kim Dae-jung faced a serious crisis. His political advisor, Lee Kang-tae, suggested him about forming an alliance with ULD in order to win the presidential election.

Meanwhile, ULD was declared as one of the "winner" of the general election, almost all seats (50/299) were at Hoseo. In addition with lower approval ratings of Kim Jong-pil, he also faced the alternatives.

While the idea was just a "suggestion", Park Tae-joon joined ULD and endorsed DJ in August 1997. It boosted the formation, and in 3 November, both DJ and JP agreed to form a political alliance. Under the alliance, DJ would run for president but in case of his win, JP would be the Prime Minister. They also agreed for constitutional amendment from presidential to parliamentary system.

The alliance led DJ to win the election, and not only at Honam but also at Hoseo. They also won with a huge margin during the local election in 1998. However, conflicts were sparked and for the general election in 2000, they faced dissidents issue. This led the alliance losing the election, whereas the main opposition, Grand National Party (GNP), won but minority.

The defeat was more serious for ULD, which only gained 17 out of 273, and was unable to be a parliamentary that required minimum 20. In order to settle this problem, 3 MPs of MDP shifted to ULD. However, the alliance was still not enough to form a majority government, therefore they formed a coalition between Democratic People's Party (DPP). Nevertheless, the alliance did not last long, as ULD supported the oppositions' motion of no-confidence for Lim Dong-won, the Minister of Unification, on 3 September 2001. The alliance was then disbanded on that day.

== Election results ==
=== Presidential ===
Election	Candidate	Votes	%	Outcome
1997	Kim Dae-jung	10,326,275	40.27	Elected

=== Legislature ===
Election	Leader	Votes	%	Seats			Position	Status
Election	Leader	Votes	%	Constituency	Party list	Total	Position	Status
2000	Kim Dae-jung	8,639,956	45.71	108 / 227	24 / 46	132 / 273	2nd	Minority gov't (2000–2001)
2000	Kim Dae-jung	8,639,956	45.71	108 / 227	24 / 46	132 / 273	2nd	DJP-DPP coalition (2001)

=== Local ===
Election	Metropolitan mayor/Governor	Provincial legislature	Municipal mayor	Municipal legislature
1998	Kim Dae-jung	10 / 16	398 / 690	113 / 232
