= Yun-Tae Kim =

South Korean academic and politician (born 1965)

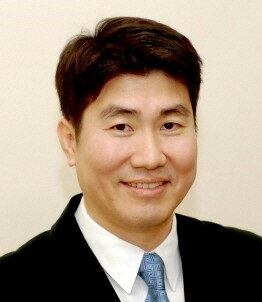

Personal details
- Party: Minjoo Party of Korea
- Occupation: professor

Kim Yun-Tae (Korean: 김윤태; born 3 July 1965) is a South Korean academic and politician. He is a member of the Minjoo Party of Korea, and is currently a professor, Department of Sociology, and Department of Social Welfare, Korea University. A sociologist, Kim is an active social welfare advocate. He has written academic and popular works regarding social issues, welfare, and politics in Korea. In 1986, Kim, as a president of student association in Korea University, contributed to university students' democratic movement and served a prison sentence of two years and six months.

He studied at University of Cambridge and later received PhD from London School of Economics and Political Science (LSE). Following the creation of the Millennium Democratic Party, Kim served as a vice-chair of policy committee. He later served as the 13th Speaker of the National Assembly Library of the Republic of Korea under President Kim Dae-jung. In March 2016, Kim announced his candidacy for the National Assembly in Gunsan, but was ultimately unsuccessful in the April parliamentary election.

== Education ==
- London School of Economics and Political Science (LSE). PhD in Sociology
- University of Cambridge, Development studies, Diploma in Development Studies
- Korea University, BA in Sociology

== Career ==
- Professor, Department of Sociology and Department of Social Welfare, Korea University
- Director of Social Policy Research Center in the Public Policy Research Institute, Korea University
- Vice-chair of Policy Committee, the Minjoo Party of Korea
- The 13th Librarian of the National Assembly Library of the Republic of Korea
- Vice-president of Korean Association of Social Welfare Policy
- Advisor of Social welfare in People's Solidarity for Participatory Democracy (Non-profit organisation)
- Director of Korea Society Opinion Institute National Assembly Policy Research Associate
- Vice-chair of policy committee, Millennium Democratic Party
- President of Student Association, Korea University (democratisation movement activist in prison for 30 months)

== Publications ==
- Human and societal collapse (2015) ISBN 9788961472135
- Korean politics: Where is it heading? (2014) (Co-author) ISBN 9788946056916
- Poverty: How to Fight (2013) ISBN 9788946055599
- Introduction to Sociology for New Generation (2012) ISBN 9788958624608
- A Happier Society for My Children (2012) – Co-author ISBN 9788996877738
- Korean Chaebol and a Developing Country (2012) ISBN 9788946046290
- Sociology for Everyone (2011) ISBN 9788958624417
- Welfare State (2010) Co-author ISBN 8946053135
- A New Way of the Progress (2009), Co-author ISBN 9788946051232
- Eleven thoughts about Creativity (2009), Co-author ISBN 9788976416919
- Bureaucrats and Entrepreneurs: The State and the Chaebol in Korea (2008) ISBN 9788988095324
- The Social Economy and Social Enterprises: Korean Seek Social Work and Social Services (2007) Co-author ISBN 9788944803031
- Beyond the Free Market (2007) ISBN 8946038152
- World History for the Educated Citizen (2007) ISBN 9788991221871
- In an Era of Soft Power (2003) ISBN 8981202451
- Wind of Change (2001), ISBN 8981201897, 9788981201890
- Chaebol and Power (2000), ISBN 8981201617, 9788981201616
- The Third Way: Tony Blair and the Britain's Choice, (1999), ISBN 8981201501
- Globalization and the Nation State: The Case of South Korea International Area Studies Review September 1999 2:3–21, doi:10.1177/223386599900200201
- Neoliberalism and the decline of the developmental state (1999): Journal of Contemporary Asia, volume 29, Issue 4, 441–461, doi:10.1080/00472339980000231
