= 15th National Assembly =

15th National Assembly may refer to:

- 15th National Assembly of France
- 15th National Assembly of Pakistan
- 15th National Assembly of South Korea
- 15th National Assembly of Vietnam
