= Kim Hyong-o =

South Korean writer and politician (born 1947)

The Right Honourable Kim Hyong-o
- 김형오
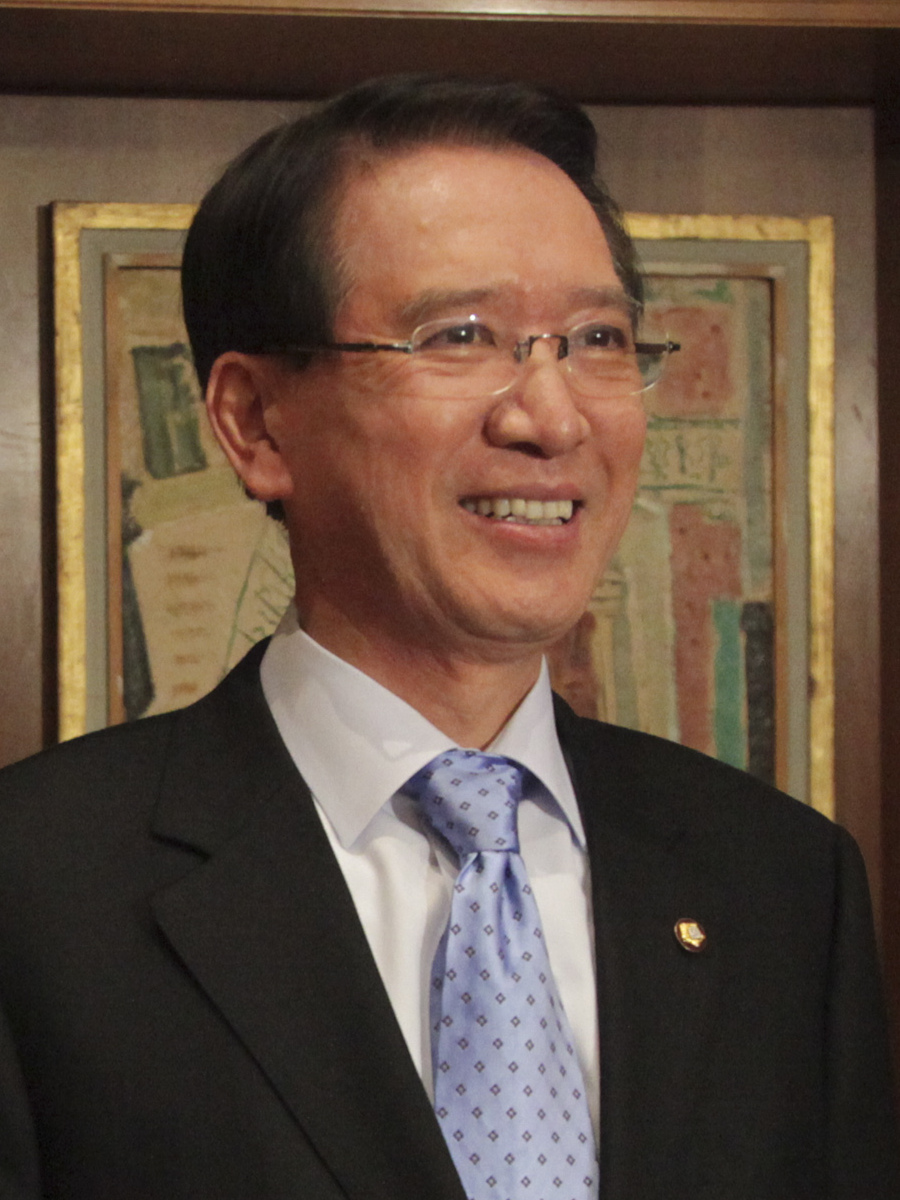
- Kim in 2010

Speaker of the National Assembly
- In office 10 July 2008 – 29 May 2010
- Deputy: Lee Yun-seong; Moon Hee-sang
- Preceded by: Lim Chae-jung
- Succeeded by: Park Hee-tae

Member of the National Assembly
- In office 30 May 1992 – 29 May 2012
- Preceded by: Kim Jung-gil
- Succeeded by: Lee Jae-kyoon
- Constituency: Busan Yeongdo

Personal details
- Born: 30 November 1947 (age 78) Sunam-ri, Goseong-eup, Goseong County, South Gyeongsang, southern Korea
- Party: People Power
- Other political affiliations: DJP (1982); Independent (1982–1990); DLP (1990–1995); NKP (1995–1997); GNP (1997–2012) (Note: Party membership was suspended from 2008 to 2010 as the Speaker is not allowed to be affiliate with any parties.); Saenuri (2012–2017); LKP (2017-2020); UFP (2020)
- Spouse: Chi In-kyung
- Children: 2
- Education: Seoul National University; Kyungnam University
- Occupation: Writer, politician

Korean name
- Hangul: 김형오
- Hanja: 金炯旿
- RR: Gim Hyeongo
- MR: Kim Hyŏngo

Kim Hyong-o (Korean: 김형오, born 30 November 1947) is a South Korean writer and politician. He was a long-term Member of the National Assembly for Yeongdo from 1992 to 2012. During the parliamentary career, he served as the Speaker of the National Assembly from 2008 to 2010.

== Early life and education ==
Born in Sunam-ri, Goseong-eup, Kim attended Goseong Primary School and Kyungnam High School. He had obtained a bachelor's degree in diplomacy and a master's degree in political science at Seoul National University. He furthered his studies at Kyungnam University and graduated with a doctorate in political science.

== Career ==
Following the graduation, Kim worked at The Dong-A Ilbo, one of the country's main conservative newspapers. Then, he worked as a researcher at the Diplomacy and National Security Academy from 1978 to 1982 and so on. Other than political career, he has written various essays and novels, such as A Stone Wall House and the Wave Roar (돌담집 파도소리) in 1999, Sultan and Emperor (술탄과 황제) in 2012 and so on.

Kim was also the chair-professor at Pusan National University. is the incumbent President of the Association of Commemorative Services for Patriot Kim Koo, a non-governmental organisation honouring the late Kim Ku.

== Political career ==
Kim started his political career as the Executive Officer of the Office of the President under the President Chun Doo-hwan from 1982 to 1986. Soon, he was appointed the Secretary to the Prime Minister for Political Affairs from 1986 to 1990 and to the President in 1990 under Roh Tae-woo. He then was brought to the then-ruling Democratic Liberal Party (DLP) and served as the Head of Yeongdo DLP Division.

Kim was elected to the National Assembly for Yeongdo constituency in 1992 election. He was re-elected in 1996, 2000, 2004 and 2008. In 1998, while he was the Chairman of the Information and Communications Commission of the Grand National Party (GNP), he revealed a controversy that the Agency for National Security Planning (ANSP; now the National Intelligence Service) was continuously tapping via mobile phone, which was later proved as true. In 2004, he served as the Secretary-General of the GNP and helped the party president Park Geun-hye to revive its support which declined due to the impeachment of the then-President of the Republic Roh Moo-hyun.

Following the victory of the GNP in 2008 election, Kim was nominated as the Speaker of the National Assembly, defeating Ahn Sang-soo. He was the youngest person serving the position. After doing his duty for 2 years, he did not stand in 2012 election and retired from politics. He then served as an executive advisor of the Saenuri Party but withdrew from the party shortly before the 2016 election.

Prior to the 2020 election, the Liberty Korea Party (LKP) brought him in order to manage the candidate preselection and nomination issue. He continued his duty after the party was re-established as the United Future Party (UFP). He was favourably reviewed for eliminating candidates accused of hate speeches or close to the former President Park Geun-hye. Nevertheless, his controversial decision to eliminate 2 key figures of the party — Hong Jun-pyo and Kim Tae-ho, provoked criticisms in which both of them complained and announced to run as independent candidates. Following the incident of nominating Kim Mi-kyoon for Gangnam 3rd constituency who had frequently expressed his support of the President Moon Jae-in, he finally resigned from that position.

== Public image ==
Kim is widely regarded as a rationalist and a reformist in South Korean society. Hwang Kyo-ahn, the President of the UFP, described him as "innovative and reformative". His image is described as a "soft compromiser" rather than a "harsh shouter". He is also well known as a factionless politician, despite a close relationship with the former President Lee Myung-bak. While a parliamentarian, he was depicted as "a politician who worked for the entire country, not just for a region".

== Personal life ==
Kim is married to Chi In-kyung and has 2 daughters. He is a Protestant, affiliated with Presbyterian Church.

== Works ==
- Eavesdroppers (1999)
- A Stone Wall House and the Wave Roar (1999)
- Hope Letter Flied on the Road (2009)
- This Beautiful Country I Have To Love (2010)
- Sultan and Emperor
- Whom Is This Country For? (2016)
- Sultan and Emperor (Rewritten) (2016)

== Election results ==
Year	Elections	Constituency	Political party	Votes (%)	Remarks
1992	14th National Assembly General Election	Busan Yeongdo	DLP	41,922 (41.34%)	Won
1996	15th National Assembly General Election	Busan Yeongdo	NKP	39,849 (42.13%)	Won
2000	16th National Assembly General Election	Busan Yeongdo	GNP	46,562 (53.42%)	Won
2004	17th National Assembly General Election	Busan Yeongdo	GNP	39,235 (48.37%)	Won
2008	18th National Assembly General Election	Busan Yeongdo	GNP	24,426 (43.46%)	Won
