= Lee Sang-deuk =

South Korean politician and businessman (1935–2024)

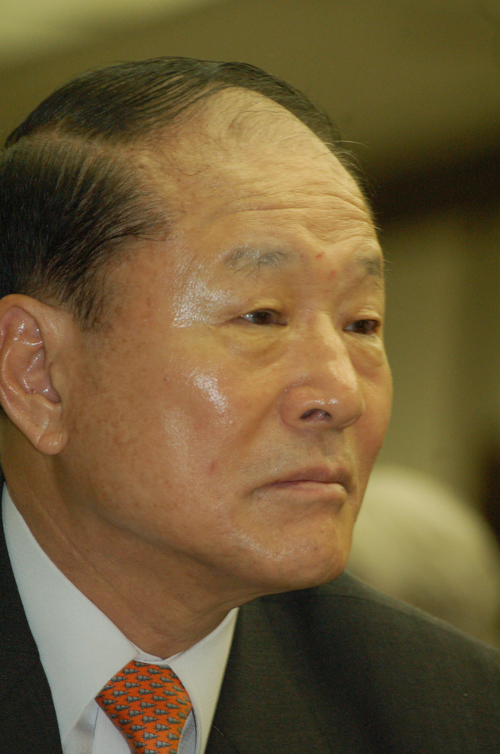
- Lee in 2009

Korean name
- Hangul: 이상득
- Hanja: 李相得
- RR: I Sangdeuk
- MR: I Sangdŭk

Lee Sang-deuk (Korean: 이상득; 29 November 1935 – 23 October 2024) was a South Korean politician and businessman. He was well known as the older brother of the former South Korean president, Lee Myung-bak. He was a member of the conservative Saenuri Party in the National Assembly. He was convicted of bribery in 2013, and sentenced to a prison sentence of one year and two months.

Lee died on 23 October 2024, at the age of 88.

== Controversies ==
- He is alleged to be the ringleader of the illegal political-level investigation towards civilian institutions and individuals by the ruling party, the Grand National Party.
- During the controversial passing of the year 2011 budget bill, he is alleged to obtain an unusually enormous funding for his representative area, Pohang. Political critics call this act a capitalization of "big brother" budget due to his close kinship ties with Lee Myung-bak. Democratic Party assembly leader, Park Ji-weon, criticized this act as contributing to the unbalanced and unfair budget distribution all across South Korea.
- He was criticized for making a jingoistic suggestion about marking the Taegeuk symbol on the food supplies for the 2011 Tōhoku earthquake and tsunami victims.
- He possessed a piece of land in secret between 1995 and 2003 under secret deal with Samho, a Korean company, and the National Intelligence Service.

== Allegations of bribery ==
- A personal aide of Lee Sang-deuk was arrested for receiving briberies that involved Lee Kuk-chul, chairman of the shipbuilding company, SLS Group.
- Lee later declared that the 700 million won in secretary's bank account is officially under his ownership.

== Election results ==
Year	Elections	Constituency	Political party	Votes (%)	Results
1988	13th National Assembly General Election	Yongil–Ulleung (North Gyeongsang)	DJP	47,795 (51.67%)	Won
1992	14th National Assembly General Election	Yongil–Ulleung (North Gyeongsang)	DLP	50,435 (52.89%)	Won
1996	15th National Assembly General Election	Pohang Nam–Ulleung (North Gyeongsang)	NKP	55,105 (48.77%)	Won
2000	16th National Assembly General Election	Pohang Nam–Ulleung (North Gyeongsang)	GNP	64,067 (53.45%)	Won
2004	17th National Assembly General Election	Pohang Nam–Ulleung (North Gyeongsang)	GNP	59,370 (50.10%)	Won
2008	18th National Assembly General Election	Pohang Nam–Ulleung (North Gyeongsang)	GNP	68,392 (69.62%)	Won
