= Koscom =

Korean financial IT company

- Company type: Public
- Industry: Financial IT Service
- Founded: 1977; 49 years ago as Korea Securities Computing Corporation
- Headquarters: Seoul, South Korea
- Key people: Woo, Joo Ha, CEO and Chairman
- Revenue: ₩203,862,168,098 KRW $209 million USD (2007)
- Number of employees: 507 full-time (2007)
- Parent: Financial Services Commission
- Website: www.koscom.co.kr

The Korea Securities Computing Corporation (Koscom; Korean: 코스콤) is a Korean financial IT company that provides the IT infrastructure to the Korean financial securities and futures markets. It also provides a trading platform, market data and other financial systems for the Korean market.

It was launched by the Ministry of Finance (MOSF) and the Korea Exchange (KRX) in 1977.

It has five corporate divisions with providing IT infrastructure to the Korean financial securities and futures market. Koscom also offers online stock trading systems that enable users to access to financial database and place trades by Home Trading System or using a customized terminal for professional traders in securities as well as other electronic financial services.

Major Korean financial firms typically have subscription to the Koscom's online trading services, including market news, price quotes and financial market data.

== History ==
Koscom was established in 1977 by the Ministry of Finance and the Korea Exchange. In the 1980s, a synthesized electronic financial system for operating the entire capital market was required due to a rapid growth of the Korean stock market. In order to provide customers with a stable environment for making safe, easy and speedy stock trading with every financial services company, Koscom launched electronic financial services by building automated trading systems for securities firms, insurance companies, government agencies and banks.

The Korea Exchange is the largest shareholder of Koscom and a quarter of its shares split into several securities firms. Since South Korea has opened its financial market to foreign investors in 1992, Koscom has been developing an integrated online financial system that would be utilized by the financial community to accurately monitor and analyze the entire capital flow of the Korean financial market. In 1988, Koscom initially introduced automated trading systems for financial markets. Koscom developed a data search tool and began to install terminals, including the latest service called CHECKExpert for professional investors or brokers. The system also provides market activity news and information on securities firms or information businesses as well as real-time financial market data movement to its users. The company launched STOCK-NET(1991), CRS2000(1999), SignKorea(2000) and ISAC(2003) services.

== Milestones ==
=== Foundation and early years ===
- Founded in September 1977
- Computer implementation and operation systems for Korea Exchange initiated in April 1978
- Stock Quotation Bulletin Board system initiated in July 1979
- Automated stock trading system launched in March 1988
- Foreign Investors’ Investment Limit Management System launched in July 1994
- CHECKExpert (A terminal for professional investors) Service launched in December 1995
- ISO 9001, Tick IT acquisition in March 1998

=== 1998–2005 ===
- Launched Home Trading System (On-line Trading Service) for securities companies in 1998
- Certificate authority entitled in February 2000
- SignKorea (Digital Certificate) Service launched in April 2000
- CMS (Consolidated Security Management) Center opened in January 2001
- CMMI Level 4 achieved (CMMI: Capability Maturity Model Integration) in November 2005

=== 2007 - present ===
- PowerBase (Total solution for securities firms) launched in February 2007
- Asia PKI Best Practice Award received in March 2007
- The 30th Anniversary of Establishment celebrated in September 2007
- Build Bond Trading System for Malaysia Exchange in February 2008
- Operated pork futures trading system in Jul. 2008
- Build Trading Platform for Lao Securities Exchange(LSX) in January 2011
- Build Derivatives Clearing & Settlement System for Bursa Malaysia in February 2012
- Build Trading Platform for Cambodia Securities Exchange(CSX) in April 2012

== Services and products ==
All listed companies on the Korea Exchange can be traded on Koscom systems, where they are automatically executed by the order matching system. The system also allows the processing of orders to trade matching, reporting and settlement. The Korea Exchange (KRX) Trading System is categorized into three sections:

- KRX Futures and Options Market Trading System
- KRX KOSDAQ Market Trading System
- KRX Stock Market Trading System (Stocks, bonds, etc.)

The unlisted securities which are not listed on the Korea Exchange or KOSDAQ are traded on the Korea Securities Dealers Association (KSDA) FreeBoard. Koscom implements and operates electronic systems for the FreeBoard and OTC Bonds trading.
