= Cho Il-hyeon =

South Korean politician (1955–2026)

- 조일현

Member of the National Assembly of South Korea
- In office 30 May 2004 – 29 May 2008
- In office 30 May 1992 – 29 May 1996

Personal details
- Born: 15 July 1955 Hongcheon County, South Korea
- Died: 17 May 2026 (aged 70)
- Party: UNP; Uri
- Education: Sangji University (BA); Hanyang University (MA); Peking University (PhD); Kyonggi University (PhD)
- Occupation: Academic

Cho Il-hyeon (Korean: 조일현; 15 July 1955 – 17 May 2026) was a South Korean politician. A member of the Unification National Party and the Uri Party, he served in the National Assembly from 1992 to 1996 and again from 2004 to 2008.

Cho died on 17 May 2026, at the age of 70.
