= Shin Ki-ha =

South Korean politician (1941–1997)

- Born: April 27, 1941; Hamupyon-gun, Zenranan-dō, Korea, Empire of Japan
- Died: August 6, 1997 (aged 56); Asan, Guam, U.S.
- Education: Chonnam National University
- Occupation: Politician
- Political party: National Congress for New Politics

Shin Ki-ha (Korean: 신기하; Hanja: 辛基夏; RR: Sin Giha; MR: Sin Kiha; April 27, 1941 – August 6, 1997), was a South Korean politician. A four-term lawmaker, he was a former parliamentary leader of the South Korean political party National Congress for New Politics.

== Early life and education ==
Shin was born in April 1941 in Hamupyon-gun, Zenranan-dō, Korea, Empire of Japan (now Hampyeong County, South Jeolla Province, South Korea). He attended Chonnam National University.

== Death ==
On August 6, 1997 Shin, his wife, and around 20 to 24 party members boarded Korean Air Flight 801 from Seoul to Guam. On August 6, 1997 the aircraft hit the ground and crashed while attempting a landing at Antonio B. Won Pat International Airport. Shin, dozens of members of his political party, and his wife, all died in the crash.
