= Shin Nak-yun =

South Korean politician (born 1941)

Shin Nak-gyun
- 신낙균

Personal details
- Born: February 1, 1941 (age 84); Keiki Province, Korea, Empire of Japan
- Citizenship: South Korea
- Political party: Independent
- Education: George Washington University Graduate School
- Profession: Professor
- Religion: Protestant

Korean name
- Hangul: 신낙균
- Hanja: 申樂均
- RR: Sin Nakgyun
- MR: Sin Nakkyun

Shin Nak-gyun (Korean: 신낙균, born February 1, 1941) is a South Korean activist, politician, and professor. She was the 5th Minister of Culture and Tourism, being appointed in 1998, and served in the 15th and 18th National Assembly.
