= National Integration 21 =

2002–2004 political party in South Korea

National Integration 21 국민통합21
- Leader: Lee In-won (acting) (Note: At time of dissolution.)
- Founder: Chung Mong-joon
- Founded: November 11, 2002
- Dissolved: September 13, 2004
- Headquarters: Jungang, 70-gil, Gukhoe-daero, Yeongdeungpo-gu, Seoul
- Membership: 48,397
- Ideology: Conservative liberalism Economic liberalism
- Political position: Centre-right
- Colours: Navy Blue; Blue Gray
- National Assembly: 1 / 299
- Metropolitan Mayors and Governors: 0 / 16
- Municipal Mayors: 0 / 234
- Provincial and Metropolitan Councillors: 0 / 933
- Municipal Councillors: 0 / 3,034

Party flag

Korean name
- Hangul: 국민통합21
- Hanja: 國民統合21
- RR: Gungmin tonghap 21
- MR: Kungmin t'onghap 21

National Integration 21 (Korean: 국민통합21) was a South Korean political party founded on 11 November 2002 by independent lawmaker Chung Mong-joon.

== History ==
Representative Chung Mong-joon who served as the President of the Korea Football Association for the 2002 FIFA World Cup, was mentioned as a leading presidential contender in the 16th South Korean Presidential Election held in 2002, following the successful hosting of the 2002 Fifa World Cup, co-hosted by South Korea and Japan, and the South Korea national football team's advancement to the semifinails. Consequently, Chung Mong-joon founded the National Integration 21.

Chung Mong-joon competed with Roh Moo-hyun, the candidate for the Millennium Democratic Party, over the issue of unifying their candidacies, eventually agreeing on a method based on public opinion polls. On 24 November 2002, the Millennium Democratic Party and National Integration 21 released the results of a poll conducted by Research & Research, showing Roh Moo-hyun at 46.8% and Chung Mong-joon at 42.2%; consequently, Chung decided to unify his candidacy with Roh's. However, on the night of 18 December 2002, just seven hours before the presidential election, Kim Haeng the spokesperson for National Integration 21, held an emergency press conference to announce that Chung was dissolving his alliance with Roh and withdrawing his support. Chung took issue with comments Roh made at a rally in Myeong-dong, Seoul where Roh stated "If the United States and North Korea fight, we will step in to mediate", and mentioned Supreme Council members Chung Dong-young and Choo Mi-ae as potential future presidential contenders for the Millenium Democratic Party. Upon hearing the news, Roh visited Chung's home in an attempt to persuade him but the meeting did not take place. In the aftermath, a large number of party officials affiliated with National Integration 21 left the party between 19 December and 20 December. Chung Mong-joon also stepped down as the leader of National Integration 21 on 26 June 2003.

In the 2004 South Korean legislative election, the party fielded three constituency candidates (one in Seoul and two in Ulsan) and four proportional representation candidates (Lee In-won, Park Won-kyung, Lee Sook-ja, and Kim Moon-il); however, only Chung Mong-joon, running in Ulsan Dong-gu, was elected, while all the other candidates failed to win seats. In the proportional representation vote, the party secured 119,746 votes (0.6% of the total), failing to win any proportional representation seats. The party was subsequently dissolved after the National Election Commission revoked its resignation on 13 September 2004; this action followed the expiration of a 180-day grace period granted after the party failed to meet the requirements of the Political Parties Act, amended in March 2004, which mandated that a political party maintain at least 1,000 members in each of five or more city or provincial districts nationwide. Most of the party's members subsequently joined the Grand National Party.

== Past leaders ==
- 1st: Chung Mong-joon (11 November 2002 - 26 June 2003)
- 2nd: Shin Nak-kyun
- Acting: Lee In-won

== See also ==
- 2002 South Korean presidential election
- Chung Mong-joon
