= Kim Chong-hoh =

South Korean politician

- Born: November 30, 1935
- Died: March 3, 2018 (aged 82)
- Known for: President of the World Scout Parliamentary Union

Korean name
- Hangul: 김종호
- Hanja: 金宗鎬
- RR: Gim Jongho
- MR: Kim Chongho

Kim Chong-hoh (November 30, 1935 – March 3, 2018) was a South Korean parliamentarian and Home Affairs Committee chairman.

== Career ==
Kim served as the founding President of the World Scout Parliamentary Union, and as a parliamentarian, he was instrumental in the creation of a group of former Scouts elected to representative positions in Korea, in 1983.

== Awards ==
In 1998, Kim was awarded the 265th Bronze Wolf, the only distinction of the World Organization of the Scout Movement, awarded by the World Scout Committee for exceptional services to world Scouting, at the 1999 World Scout Conference.
