= Democratic People's Party (South Korea) =

2000–2004 political party in South Korea

Democratic People's Party 민주국민당
- Abbreviation: DPP
- Founded: March 8, 2000
- Dissolved: April 18, 2004
- Ideology: Conservative (South Korean)
- Political position: Centre-right
- Colours: Blue; Red
- National Assembly: 2 / 271

- Democratic People's Party
- Hangul: 민주국민당
- Hanja: 民主國民黨
- RR: Minju gungmindang
- MR: Minju kungmindang

The Democratic People's Party (Korean: 민주국민당) is a minor conservative political party of South Korea. It was formed on 25 February 2000 at the National Assembly and officially launched on March 8 2000 by disaffected members of the Grand National Party. In the 2000 election, two members were elected to the National Assembly.

A political party by the same name existed during the 1950s, during the First Republic of South Korea.

== Electoral results ==
Election	Leader	Constituency				Party list				Seats		Position	Status
Election	Leader	Votes	%	Seats	+/-	Votes	%	Seats	+/-	No.	+/–	Position	Status
2000		695,423	3.68	1 / 227	new			1 / 46	new	2 / 273	new	4th	Opposition (2000–2001)
2000		695,423	3.68	1 / 227	new			1 / 46	new	2 / 273	new	4th	DJP-DNP coalition (2001)
2004		4,347	0.02	0 / 243	▼1					0 / 299	▼2	15th	Extra-parliamentary

== See also ==
- Politics of South Korea
