= National Congress for New Politics =

1995–2000 political party in South Korea

National Congress for New Politics 새정치국민회의 새政治國民會議
- Leader: Kim Dae-jung
- Founded: 5 September 1995
- Dissolved: 20 January 2000
- Merger of: New National (Note: 28 September, 1998) (majority)
- Split from: Democratic (Note: Pro-Dae-jung faction)
- Merged into: Millennium Democratic
- Headquarters: 25-4, Yeouido-dong, Yeongdeungpo-gu, Seoul
- Ideology: Liberalism (South Korean); Centrist reformism
- Political position: Centre to centre-left
- National affiliation: Alliance of DJP
- Colours: Green; Blue

- National Congress for New Politics
- Hangul: 새정치국민회의
- Hanja: 새政治國民會議
- Revised Romanization: Saejeongchigungminhoeui
- McCune–Reischauer: Saejŏngch'igungminhoeŭi

The National Congress for New Politics (NCNP; Korean: 새정치국민회의; RR: Saejeongchigungminhoeui; lit. 'New Politics National Conference') was a political party of South Korea.

== History ==
The party was formed in 1995 as the National Congress for New Politics after Kim Dae-jung returned to active politics following his retirement in 1992. The majority of the party's early supporters were former members of the opposition Democratic Party, formed in 1991.

In the 1996 Parliamentary election the party managed to come a strong second, winning 79 seats. Later Kim's Democratic Party merged with the party. In the 1997 Presidential election, the party formed Alliance of DJP along with Alliance of Liberal Democrats, and Kim won the Presidency with 40% of the vote.

Dozens of members of the party, including Shin Ki-ha, were killed in the crash of Korean Air Flight 801 in August 1997.

In 2000, the party merged with the smaller New People Party, led by Lee In-je, and a number of conservative politicians to create the Millennium Democratic Party.

== Ideology ==
The party was once for Third Way, and neoliberalism, whilst espousing a neo-developmental state.

== Presidential election primary ==
=== Candidates ===
This is a list of official pre-registered candidates that declared their 2007 presidential bid.

Name	Occupation	Results	Notes
Cho Sun-hyeong(조순형)	Member for Seongbuk-gu-eul		led the impeachment of Roh Moo-hyun in 2004
Kim Min-seok(김민석)	Former Assembly member		Former Seoul mayoral candidate in 2002 local body election (when Lee Myung Bak was elected that position)
Lee In-je(이인제)	Member for Nonsan, Geumsan and Gyeryung		Presidential candidate of election 1997
Shin Guk-hwan(신국환)	Member for Munkyeong and Yecheon		Former Minister of Commerce, Industry and Energy of Roh's Administration
Jang Sang(장 상)	Former leader of Democratic party		Former president of Ewha Womans University

- Kim Yeong-hwan(김영환), former Assembly member and also former Minister of Science and Technology of the Kim Dae-jung Administration has been declared not to run in its presidential primary on August 31, 2007

== Election results ==
=== President ===
Election	Candidate	Votes	%	Result
1997	Kim Dae-jung	10,326,275	40.27	Elected

=== Legislature ===
Election	Leader	Votes	%	Seats			Position	Status
Election	Leader	Votes	%	Constituency	Party list	Total	Position	Status
1996	Kim Dae-jung	4,971,961	25.30	66 / 253	13 / 46	79 / 299	2nd	Governing coalition

=== Local ===
Election	Metropolitan mayor/Governor	Provincial legislature	Municipal mayor	Municipal legislature
1998	6 / 16	271 / 616	84 / 232	

== See also ==
- List of political parties in South Korea
- Politics of South Korea
- Elections in South Korea
- Liberalism in South Korea
