= 2004 South Korean legislative election =

- 15 April 2004

All 299 seats in the National Assembly 150 seats needed for a majority
- Turnout: 60.63% (▲3.38pp; Const. votes); 60.63% (New; PR votes)
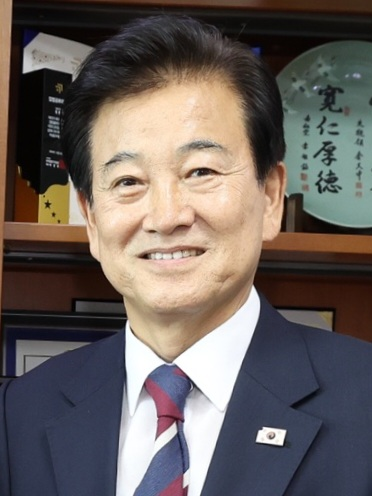

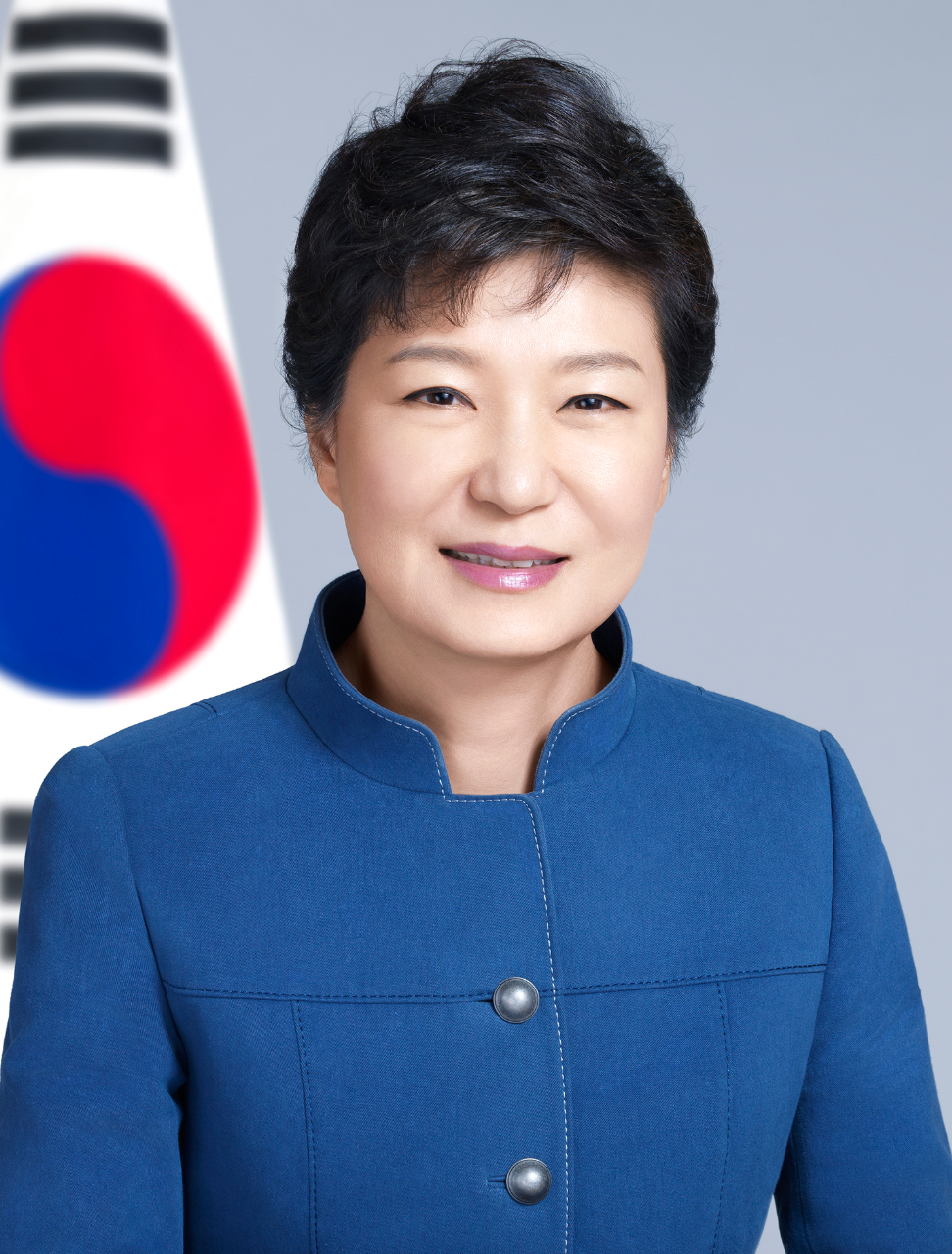

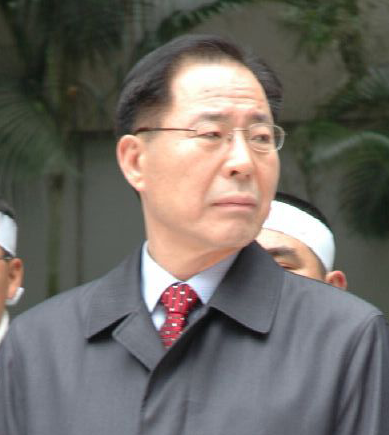

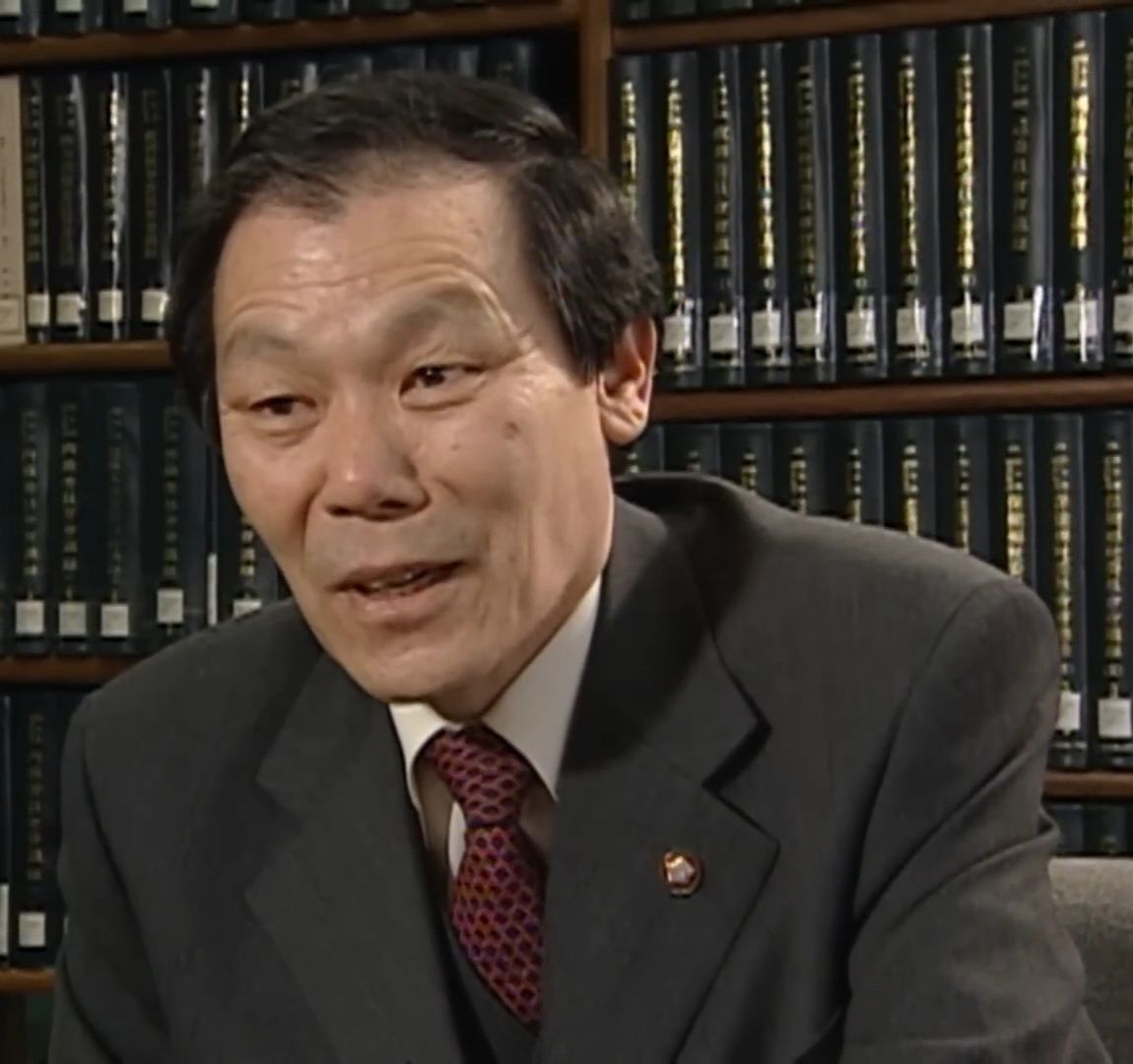
	Majority party	Minority party
Leader	Chung Dong-young	Park Geun-hye
Party	Uri	Grand National
Last election	Did not exist	133 seats
Seats won	152	121
Seat change	New	▼12
Constituency vote	8,957,665	8,083,609
% and swing	41.99% (New)	37.90% (▼1.06pp)
Regional vote	8,145,824	7,613,660
% and swing	38.27% (New)	35.77% (New)
	Third party	Fourth party
Leader	Kwon Young-ghil	Cho Soon-hyung
Party	Democratic Labor	Millennium Democratic
Last election	0 seats	115 seats
Seats won	10	9
Seat change	▲10	▼106
Constituency vote	920,229	1,698,368
% and swing	4.31% (▼3.13pp)	7.09% (▼28.78pp)
Regional vote	2,774,061	2,774,061
% and swing	13.03% (New)	7.96% (New)
- Results of the election.
Speaker before election
Park Kwan-yong
Grand National
Elected Speaker
Kim Won-ki
Uri

Legislative elections were held in South Korea on 15 April 2004. In the 17th election for the National Assembly, voters elected 299 members of the legislature. The newly formed Uri Party and other parties supporting President Roh Moo-hyun, who was impeached by the outgoing National Assembly, won a majority of seats. This was the first time a centre-left liberal party won a majority in the National Assembly since 1960.

== Electoral system ==
The election was held under parallel voting, with 243 members elected in single-member constituencies via first-past-the-post voting and the remainder elected via proportional representation. Proportional seats were only available to parties which won three percent of the national valid vote among seat-allocated parties and/or won five or more constituency seats.

== Political parties ==
Parties	Leader	Ideology	Seats		Status
Parties	Leader	Ideology	Last election	Before election	Status
Grand National Party	Park Geun-hye	Conservatism	133 / 273	139 / 273	Opposition
Millennium Democratic Party	Cho Soon-hyung	Liberalism	115 / 273	59 / 273	Government (2000–2003)
Millennium Democratic Party	Cho Soon-hyung	Liberalism	115 / 273	59 / 273	Opposition (2003–2004)
Millennium Democratic Party	Cho Soon-hyung	Liberalism	115 / 273	49 / 273 (Note: Uri Party)	Government (2003–2004)
United Liberal Democrats	Kim Jong-pil	Conservatism	17 / 273	10 / 273	Governing coalition (2000–2001)
United Liberal Democrats	Kim Jong-pil	Conservatism	17 / 273	10 / 273	Opposition (2001–2004)
Democratic People's Party		Conservatism	2 / 273	1 / 273	Opposition
New Korea Party of Hope		Conservatism	1 / 273	Dissolved	Opposition

The newly formed liberal Uri Party (Uri-dang or Our Party) gained support through its opposition to the impeachment of President Roh. It won 32 out of 49 seats in Seoul, 44 out of 62 in Incheon and Gyeonggi, confirming that a majority of voters supported the President Roh.

The conservative Grand National Party, which supported the impeachment of President Roh, suffered a loss of support, but won a majority in North Gyeongsang and South Gyeongsang regions and retained the 100 seats necessary to block constitutional changes.

The progressive, socialist Democratic Labor Party got 13.03% of vote share, but won only 10 out of 299 seats due to the FPTP system. However this was considered as a great triumph within political landscape of South Korea which is traditionally anti-communist and against left-wing policies. DLP also won two FPTP seats in Ulsan and Changwon based on labor movement.

The Millennium Democratic Party, formerly the major liberal party, was the second-largest party prior to the election but sustained the biggest loss in the backlash following its leading role in the impeachment of Roh, as much of its support shifted to the Uri Party.

The United Liberal Democrats, a conservative regional party based on North Chungcheong and South Chungcheong regions, lost support since its leader, Kim Jong-pil, did not contest the last presidential election.

== Results ==
Graph of the party split among 299 seats.
Party	Proportional			Constituency			Total seats	+/–
Party	Votes	%	Seats	Votes	%	Seats	Total seats	+/–
Uri Party	8,145,824	38.27	23	8,957,665	41.99	129	152	New
Grand National Party	7,613,660	35.77	21	8,083,609	37.90	100	121	–12
Democratic Labor Party	2,774,061	13.03	8	920,229	4.31	2	10	+10
Millennium Democratic Party	1,510,178	7.09	4	1,698,368	7.96	5	9	−106
United Liberal Democrats	600,462	2.82	0	569,083	2.67	4	4	−13
Christian Party	228,837	1.08	0	8,267	0.04	0	0	New
National Integration 21	119,746	0.56	0	63,989	0.30	1	1	New
Green Social Democratic Party	103,845	0.49	0	37,789	0.18	0	0	New
Socialist Party	47,311	0.22	0	8,004	0.04	0	0	0
Democratic Unity	39,785	0.19	0				0	New
Labor Party	37,084	0.17	0	2,582	0.01	0	0	New
Hope2080	31,501	0.15	0	1,253	0.01	0	0	New
Democratic Republican Party	24,360	0.11	0	2,405	0.01	0	0	0
Confederation of Nations	9,330	0.04	0	226	0.00	0	0	New
Democratic People's Party				4,347	0.02	0	0	–2
Independents				972,954	4.56	2	2	–3
Total	21,285,984	100.00	56	21,330,770	100.00	243	299	+26
Valid votes	21,285,984	98.63		21,330,770	98.84			
Invalid/blank votes	295,566	1.37		250,174	1.16			
Total votes	21,581,550	100.00		21,580,944	100.00			
Registered voters/turnout	35,596,497	60.63		35,596,497	60.63			
Source: NEC, IPU, CLEA

=== By city/province ===
Constituency results by city/provinces
Region	Uri		GNP		DLP		MDP		ULD		NI21		Ind.		Total seats
Region	Seats	%	Seats	%	Seats	%	Seats	%	Seats	%	Seats	%	Seats	%	Total seats
Seoul	32	42.9	16	41.3	0	3.5	0	9.8	0	0.8	0	0.1	0	1.4	48
Busan	1	38.9	17	52.5	0	2.9	0	0.8	0	0.3			0	4.4	18
Daegu	0	26.8	12	62.4	0	2.6	0	1.8	0	0.4			0	5.8	12
Incheon	9	44.7	3	39.0	0	7.6	0	5.2	0	0.5			0	2.5	12
Gwangju	7	54.0	0	0.1	0	5.6	0	36.4	0	0.4			0	3.4	7
Daejeon	6	45.8	0	22.4	0	1.5	0	3.2	0	22.1			0	4.7	6
Ulsan	1	28.1	3	36.3	1	18.0	0	0.6	0	0.8	1	13.3	0	0.5	6
Gyeonggi	35	45.7	14	40.7	0	4.1	0	6.7	0	0.7			0	1.8	49
Gangwon	2	38.8	6	43.4	0	4.1	0	6.4	0	0.2			0	6.7	8
North Chungcheong	8	50.5	0	32.6	0	3.3	0	1.0	0	9.2			0	3.0	8
South Chungcheong	5	38.8	1	15.8	0	2.2	0	3.6	4	33.7			0	5.5	10
North Jeolla	11	64.6	0	0.1	0	4.6	0	18.7	0	0.1			0	11.8	11
South Jeolla	7	46.9	0	0.8	0	2.6	5	38.4	0	0.6			1	10.5	13
North Gyeongsang	0	25.8	14	54.6	0	3.4	0	0.4	0	0.6			1	15.1	15
South Gyeongsang	2	34.4	14	47.7	1	8.4	0	0.6	0	0.6			0	8.1	17
Jeju	3	49.4	0	40.2	0	3.4	0	3.8	0	0.6			0	2.7	3
Total	129	42.0	100	37.9	2	4.3	5	8.0	4	2.7	1	0.3	2	4.6	243

Party list vote results by city/provinces
Region	Uri	GNP	DLP	MDP	ULD	Other
Seoul	37.7	36.7	12.6	8.4	2.1	2.5
Busan	33.7	49.4	12.0	1.9	0.7	2.3
Daegu	22.3	62.1	11.6	1.1	0.8	2.2
Incheon	39.5	34.6	15.3	5.4	2.1	3.0
Gwangju	51.6	1.8	13.1	31.1	0.3	2.0
Daejeon	43.8	24.3	11.8	3.1	14.5	2.4
Ulsan	31.2	36.4	21.9	1.5	0.8	8.2
Gyeonggi	40.2	35.4	13.5	6.1	2.0	2.8
Gangwon	38.1	40.6	12.8	3.5	1.3	3.6
North Chungcheong	44.7	30.3	13.1	2.2	6.3	3.5
South Chungcheong	38.0	21.2	10.5	2.8	23.8	3.7
North Jeolla	67.3	3.4	11.1	13.6	1.0	3.6
South Jeolla	46.7	2.9	11.2	33.8	1.0	4.4
North Gyeongsang	23.0	58.3	12.0	1.4	1.2	4.1
South Gyeongsang	31.7	47.3	15.8	1.4	0.8	3.0
Jeju	46.0	30.8	14.1	5.1	1.1	2.9
Overall total	38.3	35.8	13.0	7.1	2.8	3.0
Seat allocation	23	21	8	4	0	0
