= New Korea Party of Hope =

2000–2001 political party in South Korea

- Leader: Kim Yong-hwan
- Founded: February 15, 2000
- Dissolved: October 20, 2001
- Headquarters: 2nd Floor, Donga Building, 10 Mapo-daero 14ga-gil, Mapo-gu, Seoul (Gongdeok-dong)
- Ideology: Conservatism
- Political position: Centre-right
- Colors: Navy blue Red
- National Assembly: 1 / 270

Korean name
- Hangul: 희망의한국신당
- Hanja: 希望의韓國新黨
- RR: Huimangui Hanguk sindang
- MR: Hŭimangŭi Han'guk sindang

New Korea Party of Hope (NKPH; Korean: 희망의한국신당) was a small political party in South Korea founded on 15 February 2000 and dissolved on 20 October 2001. It participated in the 2000 elections in South Korea, winning one seat. It has been described as conservative.

== History ==
Instead of appointing a party president, the party established rules mandating a Central Executive Committee composed of up to seven members, with the eldest member serving as chairperson. The party was officially registered with the National Election Commission on 21 February 2000.

In the 2000 South Korean Legislative Election held on the 13 April 2000 the party fielded 21 candidates for single-member districts and one candidate for proportional representation, securing one district seat. The party's sole successful candidate was Kim Yong-hwan, a former lawmaker from the United Liberal Democrats who had served as the Central Executive Committee chairperson and party representative. The party ceased to exist on 20 October 2001 after Kim Yong-hwan, its only lawmaker and representative announced the party's dissolution and joined the Grand National Party.

== Electoral results ==
Election	Leader	Votes	%	Seats			Position	Status
Election	Leader	Votes	%	Constituency	Party list	Total	Position	Status
2000		77,498	0.41	1 / 227	0 / 46	1 / 273	7th	Opposition

== See also ==
- Politics of South Korea
