= 2000 South Korean legislative election =

- 13 April 2000

All 273 seats in the National Assembly 137 seats needed for a majority
- Turnout: 57.22% (▼6.69pp)
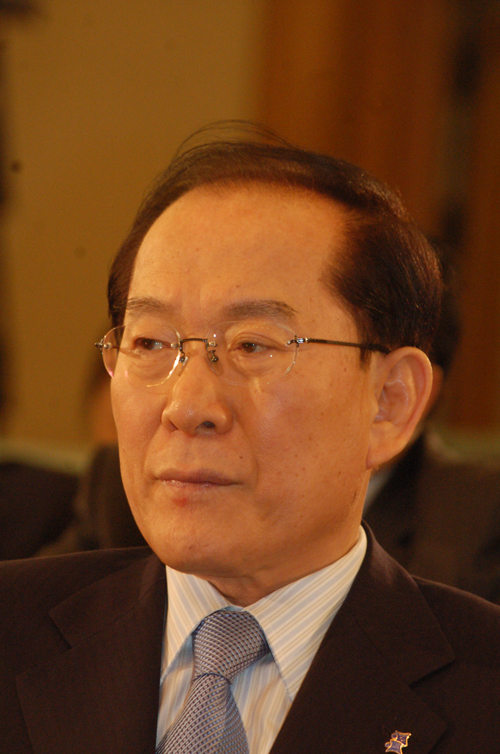

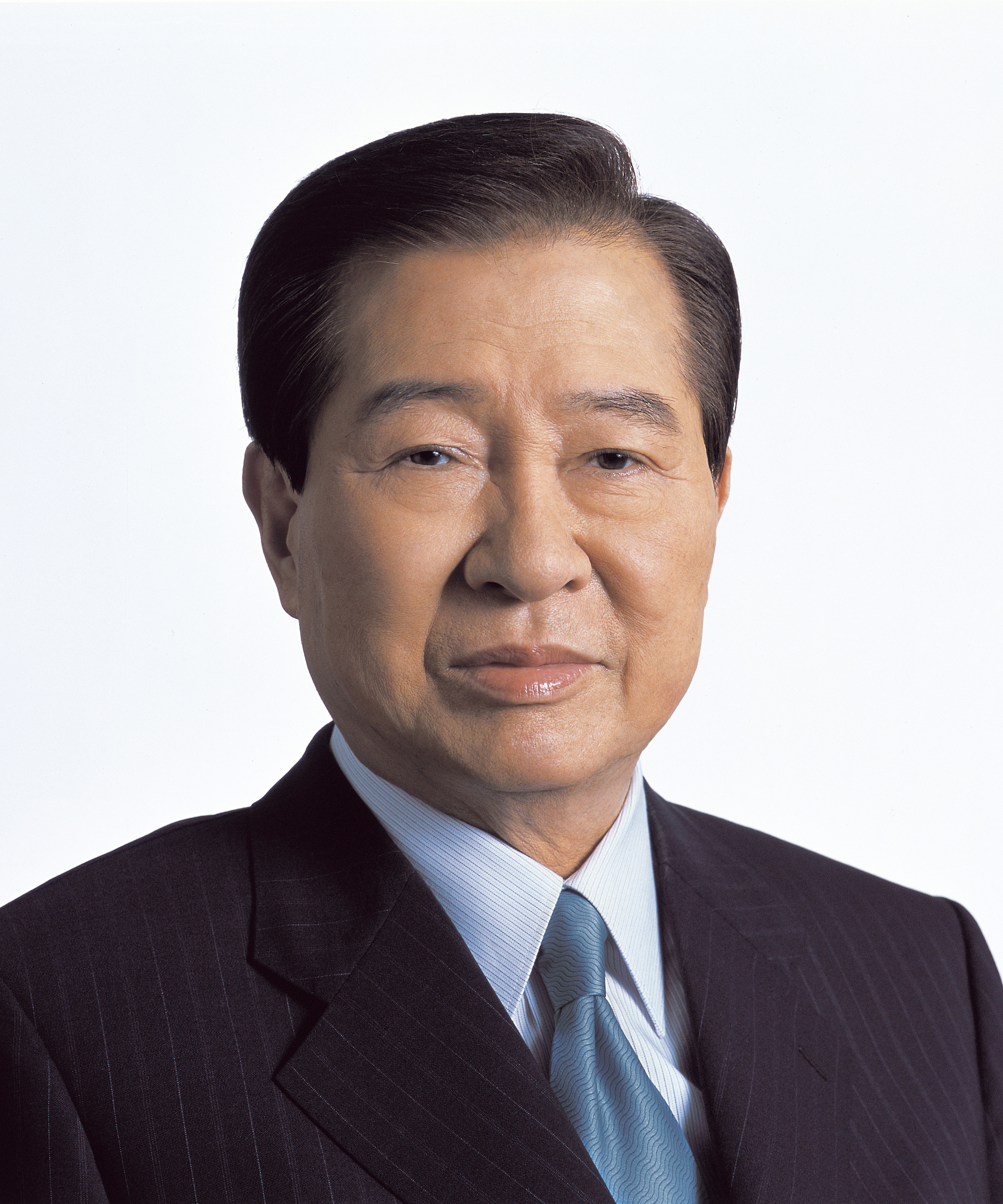

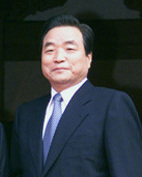
	Majority party	Minority party	Third party
Leader	Lee Hoi-chang	Kim Dae-jung	Lee Han-dong
Party	Grand National	Millennium Democratic	United Liberal Democrats
Alliance		Alliance of DJP	Alliance of DJP
Last election	140 seats (Note: New Korea Party and 1 Democratic Party representative)	79 seats (Note: as National Congress for New Politics)	50 seats
Seats won	133	115	17
Seat change	▼7	▲36	▼33
Popular vote	7,365,359	6,780,625	1,859,331
Percentage	38.96%	35.87%	9.84%
Swing	▼6.79pp	▲10.57pp	▼6.33pp
- Results of the election.
Speaker before election
Park Jyun-kyu
United Liberal Democrats
Elected Speaker
Lee Man-sup
Millennium Democratic

Legislative elections were held in South Korea on 13 April 2000 to elect the 273 members of the National Assembly. Opinion polls suggested that the ruling Millennium Democratic Party (MDP) would win the most seats, but the conservative Grand National Party (GNP) emerged as the largest party, winning 133 of the 273 seats. The MDP won 115 seats, while the United Liberal Democrats (ULD) won 17 seats.

As no party won the 137 seats required for a majority, the election resulted in a hung National Assembly.

Following the election, the Millennium Democratic Party, the United Liberal Democrats and the Democratic People's Party (DPP) formed a coalition to gain a majority. The coalition ended in 2001 when the ULD withdrew its support and joined the conservative opposition. Seven ULD lawmakers later defected to the Grand National Party, giving it a majority.

== Electoral system ==
Of the 273 seats, 227 were elected in single-member districts via first-past-the-post voting, while the remainder were allocated via proportional representation at the national level. Proportional seats were only available to parties which won three percent of the national valid vote among seat-allocated parties and/or won five or more constituency seats.

== Political parties ==
Parties	Leader	Ideology	Seats		Status
Parties	Leader	Ideology	Last election	Before election	Status
Grand National Party	Lee Hoi-chang	Conservatism	139 / 299 (Note: New Korea Party)	128 / 299	Opposition
Grand National Party	Lee Hoi-chang	Conservatism	15 / 299 (Note: United Democratic Party)	128 / 299	Opposition
Millennium Democratic Party	Cho Soon-hyung	Liberalism	79 / 299 (Note: as National Congress for New Politics)	98 / 299	Government
United Liberal Democrats	Kim Jong-pil	Conservatism	50 / 299	52 / 299	Government
Democratic People's Party	Cho Soon	Conservatism	Did not exist	8 / 299	Opposition
New Korea Party of Hope	Kim Yong-hwan; Heo Hwa-pyeong	Conservatism	Did not exist	3 / 299	Opposition

== Results ==
Graph of the party split among 273 seats.
Party or alliance		Votes	%	Seats			
Party or alliance		Votes	%	FPTP	PR	Total	+/–
Grand National Party		7,365,359	38.96	112	21	133	–21
Alliance of DJP	Millennium Democratic Party	6,780,625	35.87	96	19	115	+36
Alliance of DJP	United Liberal Democrats	1,859,331	9.84	12	5	17	–33
Alliance of DJP	Total	8,639,956	45.70	108	24	132	New
Democratic People's Party		695,423	3.68	1	1	2	New
Democratic Labor Party		223,261	1.18	0	0	0	New
Young Progressive Party		125,082	0.66	0	0	0	New
New Korea Party of Hope		77,498	0.41	1	0	1	New
Democratic Republican Party		3,950	0.02	0	0	0	New
Independents		1,774,211	9.39	5	0	5	–11
Total		18,904,740	100.00	227	46	273	–26
Valid votes		18,904,740	98.68				
Invalid/blank votes		252,384	1.32				
Total votes		19,157,124	100.00				
Registered voters/turnout		33,482,387	57.22				
Source: Nohlen et al.

=== By city/province ===
Results by city/provinces
Region	GNP		MDP		ULD		DPP		DLP		YPP		NKPH		Ind.		Total seats
Region	Seats	%	Seats	%	Seats	%	Seats	%	Seats	%	Seats	%	Seats	%	Seats	%	Total seats
Seoul	17	43.3	28	45.1	0	4.7	0	1.3	0	1.0	0	3.0	0	0.1	0	1.6	45
Busan	17	60.3	0	15.0	0	1.6	0	14.9	0	0.5			0	0.1	0	7.5	17
Daegu	11	62.9	0	10.9	0	10.2	0	6.2	0	0.5			0	0.0	0	9.2	11
Incheon	5	41.7	6	40.6	0	12.1	0	1.2	0	0.8	0	0.4			0	3.2	11
Gwangju	0	3.3	5	69.9	0	0.3	0	0.4							1	26.1	6
Daejeon	1	23.3	2	28.4	3	34.3	0	0.9	0	2.2			0	0.9	0	9.9	6
Ulsan	4	41.7	0	9.6	0	3.1	0	3.9	0	17.3					1	24.4	5
Gyeonggi	18	39.1	22	40.9	1	12.4	0	1.6	0	1.2			0	0.0	0	4.7	41
Gangwon	3	38.6	5	36.5	0	10.2	1	6.5					0	0.2	0	8.1	9
North Chungcheong	3	30.6	2	31.3	2	29.5	0	0.7					0	0.8	0	7.1	7
South Chungcheong	0	17.4	4	30.0	6	39.2	0	1.1	0	0.9			1	6.5	0	4.9	11
North Jeolla	0	3.6	9	65.4	0	3.4	0	0.2							1	27.4	10
South Jeolla	0	4.1	11	66.4	0	1.6	0	0.5							2	27.5	13
North Gyeongsang	16	52.5	0	14.7	0	14.0	0	10.1					0	0.3	0	8.4	16
South Gyeongsang	16	53.7	0	11.8	0	3.3	0	6.2	0	2.8			0	0.2	0	21.9	16
Jeju	1	44.2	2	49.4	0	0.6	0	0.4							0	5.3	3
Constituency total	112	39.0	96	35.9	12	9.8	1	3.7	0	1.2	0	0.7	1	0.4	5	9.4	227
PR seats	21		19		5		1		0		0		0		–		46
Total seats	133		115		17		2		0		0		1		5		273
