= Democratic Party (South Korea, 2000) =

2000–2007 political party in South Korea

- Abbreviation: MDP
- President: Kim Dae-jung (until 2002)
- Founded: 20 January 2000 (Note: as Millennium Democratic Party); 6 May 2005 (Note: as Democratic Party)
- Dissolved: 27 June 2007
- Merger of: National Congress for New Politics; New People Party
- Merged into: Democratic Party (2007)
- Headquarters: 25-4, Yeouido-dong, Yeongdeungpo District, Seoul, South Korea
- Ideology: Liberalism (South Korean); Centrist reformism
- Political position: Centre to centre-left
- National affiliation: Alliance of DJP (2000–2001)
- Colours: Blue green (Note: as Democratic Party); Turquoise (Note: as Millennium Democratic Party)

- Democratic Party
- Hangul: 민주당
- Hanja: 民主黨
- RR: Minjudang
- MR: Minjudang

Millennium Democratic Party
- Hangul: 새천년민주당
- Hanja: 새千年民主黨
- RR: Saecheonnyeon minjudang
- MR: Saech'ŏnnyŏn minjudang

Logo of the Millennium Democratic Party (2000–2005)

The Democratic Party (DP; Korean: 민주당) was a political party in South Korea. Formerly named Millennium Democratic Party (새천년민주당; MDP), it was renamed on 6 May 2005. After its dissolution, its members joined the Uri Party or the successor Democratic Party.

== History ==
In 2000, the party officially was founded, after it merged with National Congress for New Politics and New People Party led by Lee In-je and a number of conservative minded politicians joined it. In the 2000 Parliamentary election the party came second winning 115 seats.

Roh Moo-hyun was elected as president in 2002, but he subsequently left the party after he was inaugurated as president and his supporters formed the Uri Party in 2003.

The MDP lost majority when Roh was impeached in March 2004 by the National Assembly for illegal electioneering and incompetence charges with support from the Grand National Party, losing 53 seats to a total of only 9 seats in the 2004 parliamentary election. Roh Moo-hyun was later reinstated by the Constitutional Court, and served as president until the end of his term.

By June 2007, much of the party joined the Uri Party, while the New People faction merged the party with the Central Reform United New Party to form a new Democratic Party.

== Presidential election primary ==
=== Candidates ===
This is a list of official pre-registered candidates that declared their 2007 presidential bid.

| Name | Occupation | Results | Notes |
|---|---|---|---|
| Cho Sun-hyeong (조순형) | Member for Seoul Seongbuk B | | led the impeachment of Roh Moo-hyun in 2004 |
| Kim Min-seok (김민석) | Former Assembly member Seoul Yeongdeungpo B | | Former Seoul mayoral candidate in 2002 local body election (when Lee Myung Bak was elected that position) |
| Lee In-je (이인제) | Member for South Chungcheong Nonsan-Gyeryong-Geumsan | | Presidential candidate of election 1997 |
| Shin Guk-hwan (신국환) | Member for North Gyeongsang Munkyeong-Yeocheon | | Former Minister of Commerce, Industry and Energy of Roh's Administration |
| Jang Sang (장상) | Former leader of Democratic party | | Former president of Ewha Womans University |

- Kim Young-hwan (김영환), former Assembly member and also former Minister of Science and Technology of the Kim Dae-jung Administration has been declared not to run in its presidential primary on 31 August 2007

== Election results ==
=== President ===
| Election | Candidate | Votes | % | Result |
|---|---|---|---|---|
| 2002 | Roh Moo-hyun | 12,014,277 | 48.9 | Elected |

=== Legislature ===
| Election | Leader | Constituency | | | | Party list | | | | Seats | | Position | Status |
| Election | Leader | Votes | % | Seats | +/- | Votes | % | Seats | +/- | No. | +/– | Position | Status |
|---|---|---|---|---|---|---|---|---|---|---|---|---|---|
| 2000 | Kim Dae-jung | 6,780,625 | 35.87 | 96 / 227 | new | | | 19 / 46 | new | 115 / 273 | new | 2nd | Government |
| 2004 | Cho Soon-hyung | 1,698,368 | 7.96 | 5 / 243 | ▼91 | 1,510,178 | 7.09 | 4 / 56 | ▼15 | 9 / 299 | ▼106 | 4th | Opposition |

=== Local ===
| Election | Metropolitan mayor/Governor | Provincial legislature | Municipal mayor | Municipal legislature |
|---|---|---|---|---|
| 2002 | 4 / 16 | 143 / 682 | 44 / 227 | |
| 2006 | 2 / 16 | 80 / 733 | 20 / 230 | 276 / 2,888 |

== See also ==
- List of political parties in South Korea
- Centrist reformism
- Politics of South Korea
- Elections in South Korea
- Liberalism in South Korea
