= 2025 People Power Party presidential primary =

South Korean party election

- 22 April – 3 May 2025

100% of party members voting 50% membership votes needed to win
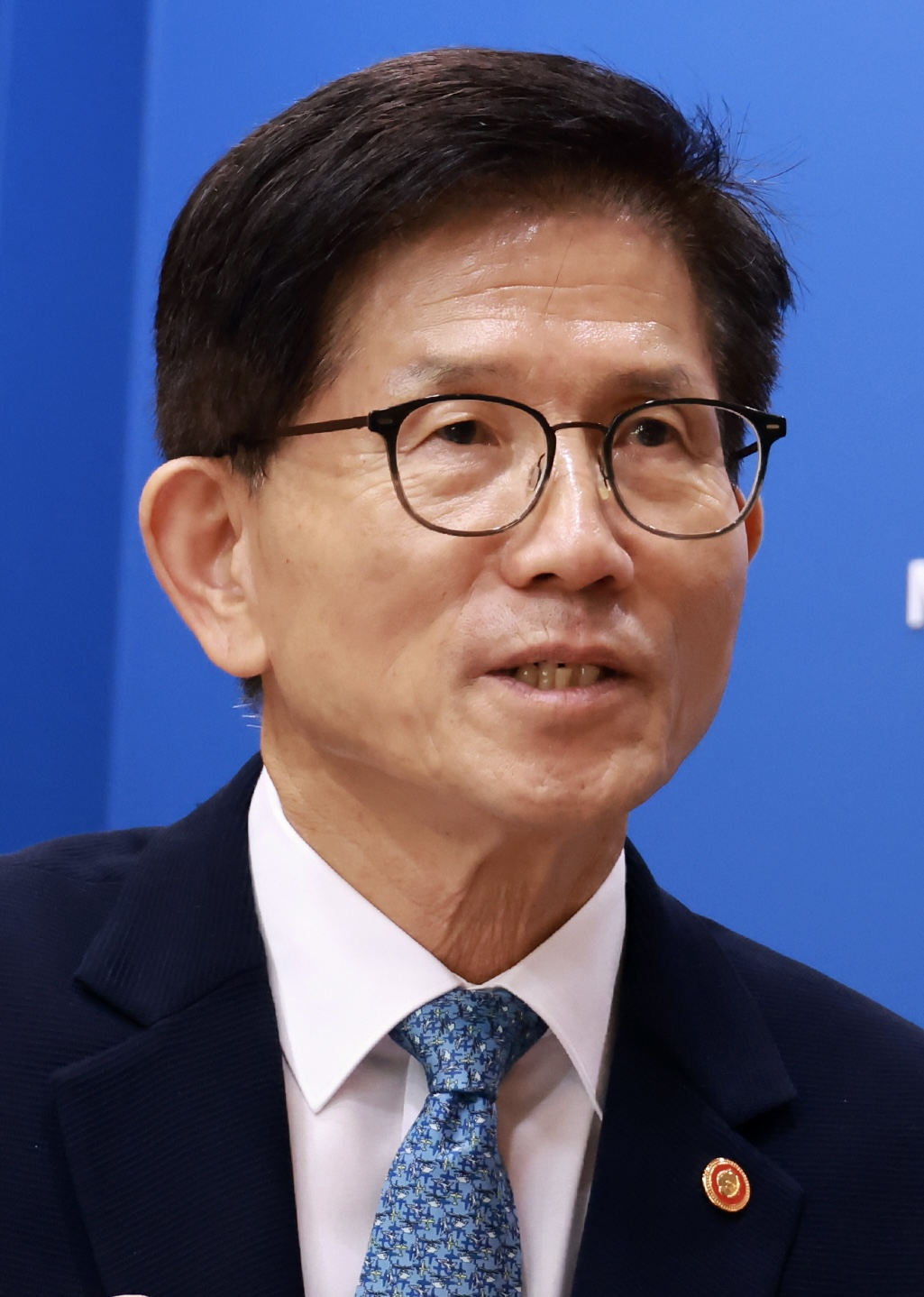

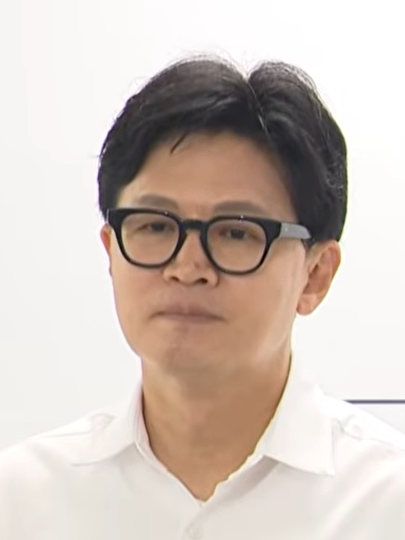

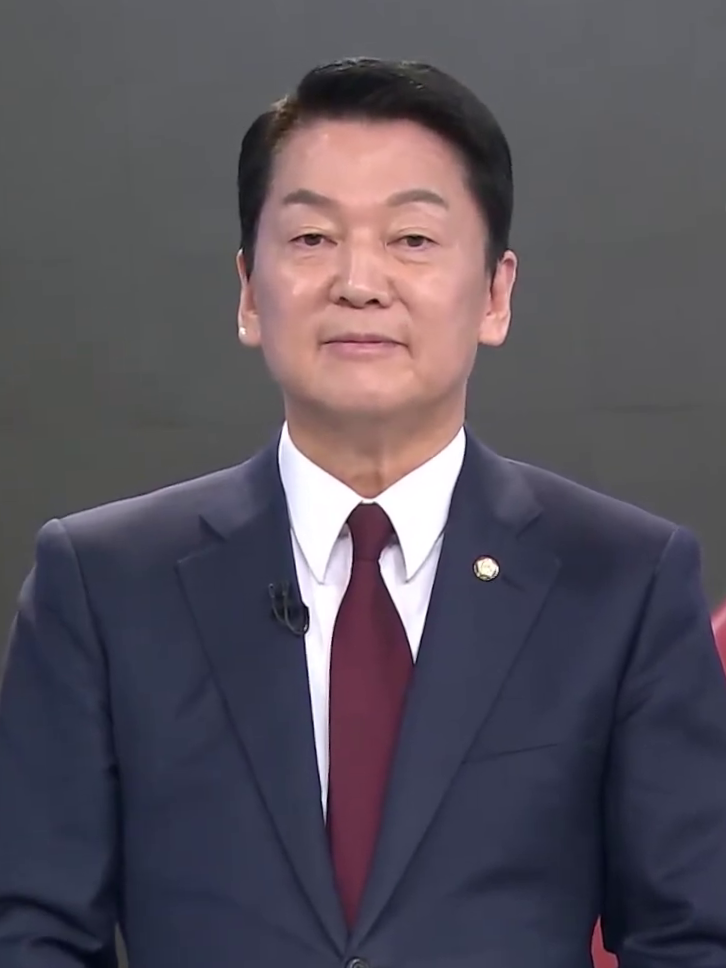

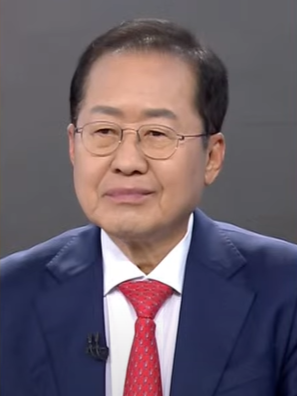
Candidate	Kim Moon-soo	Han Dong-hoon
Second round	N/A	N/A
Final round	455,044 (56.53%)	349,916 (43.47%)
Candidate	Ahn Cheol-soo	Hong Joon-pyo
Second round	N/A	N/A
Final round	Eliminated	Eliminated
Previous Presidential nominee
Yoon Suk Yeol
Presidential nominee
Kim Moon-soo

A presidential primary was held from 22 April to 3 May 2025 by the People Power Party (PPP) to select the party's nominee for the snap 2025 South Korean presidential election, which was held on 3 June 2025. The primary was held in the wake of the removal of 2022 PPP nominee Yoon Suk Yeol as President of South Korea in April 2025, following his impeachment by the National Assembly in December that was prompted by his declaration of martial law. Immediately after Yoon was removed from office, several candidates began to declare their candidacies for the party's presidential nomination. The party announced on 9 April that it would conduct a multi-stage primary system involving the use of polls, public surveys, and party membership votes, culminating in the official selection of the party's nominee on 3 May. The primary was held concurrently with the primary of the opposition Democratic Party.

At the party's National Convention held at Korea International Exhibition Center in Goyang, Gyeonggi on 3 May, Kim Moon-soo was announced as the winner of the primary, winning 56.53% of the final vote.

== Background ==
=== 2022 election and Yoon Suk Yeol's presidency ===
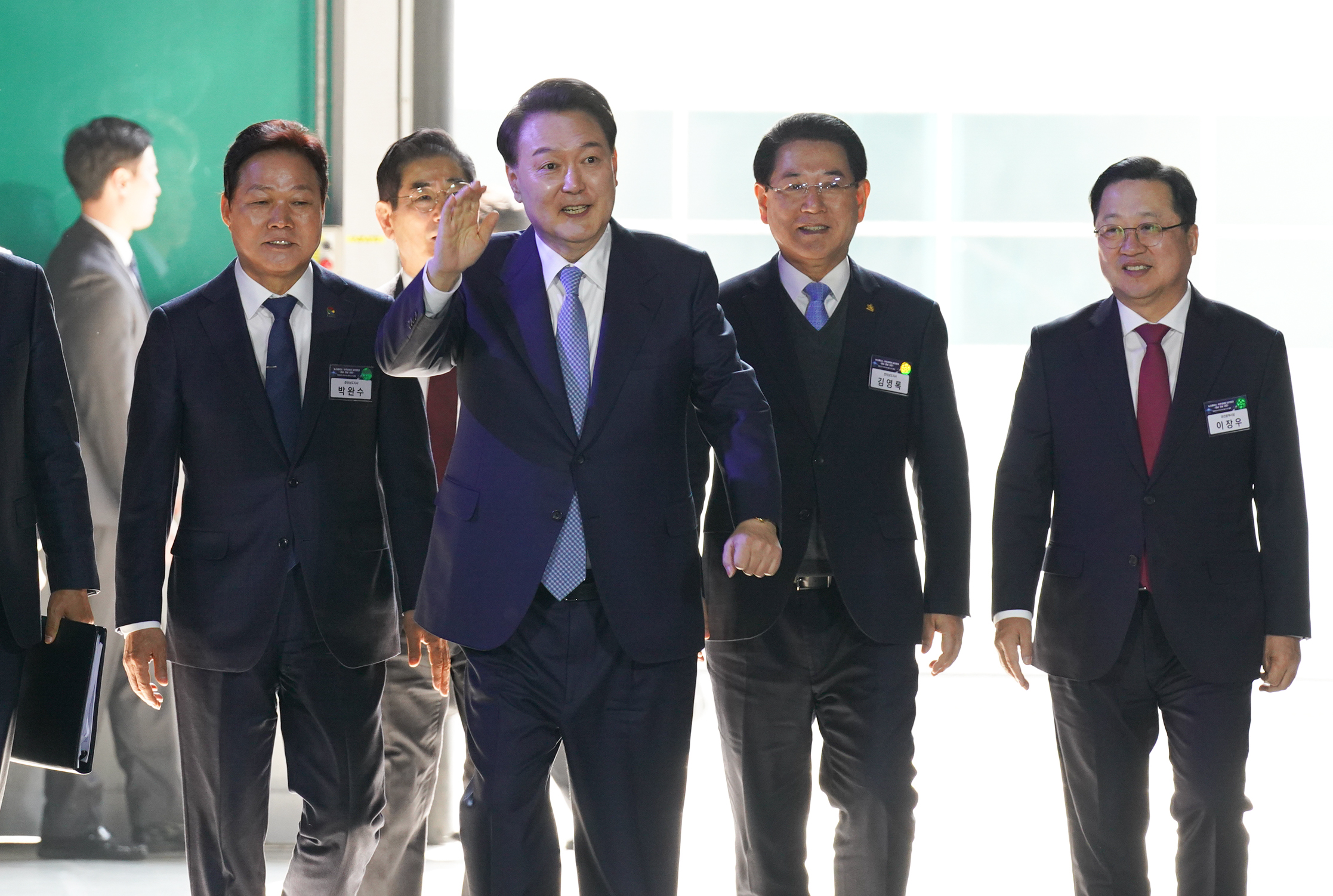
Yoon Suk Yeol (pictured in March 2024) was impeached and removed from office as President of South Korea.

Yoon Suk Yeol was selected as the party's nominee for the 2022 presidential election after winning the primary in November 2021, defeating three other candidates. Yoon won the primary with less than 50% of the vote, only winning a plurality of 48%. Yoon would go on to win the presidential election, defeating Democratic Party nominee Lee Jae-myung by a margin of less than 1%, again failing to secure an overall majority.

During Yoon's tenure, he suffered from several domestic crises, such as the 2024 doctors strike, and scandals involving his wife, First Lady Kim Keon-hee.

In the 2024 legislative election, the Democratic-led opposition won a landslide victory and maintained their majority in the National Assembly, while the PPP obtained 108 seats in the 22nd Assembly. Yoon became a "lame duck" President following the defeat. Chairman of the PPP Emergency Committee, Han Dong-hoon, resigned following the defeat.

=== Martial law crisis and impeachment ===
On 3 December 2024 Yoon declared martial law, creating a political crisis. The National Assembly voted to impeach him on 14 December 2024, with 204 of 300 lawmakers in support, including PPP lawmakers. On 4 April 2025, the Constitutional Court of Korea upheld his impeachment, and removed Yoon from office, creating a vacating in the presidency. On 8 April, acting president Han Duck-soo announced that the election would be held on 3 June 2025.

== Organization and process ==
The People Power Party announced on 9 April 2025 that it would hold a party convention in May to select its nominee for the presidential election. The PPP's election committee confirmed the date during a meeting; party spokesman Ho Jun-seok stated that "We plan to select our candidate through the party convention the day before on May 3." To ensure fairness, the party implemented new rules that required every campaign to report their planned polls in advance to the party's planning and coordination office. The PPP also confirmed that the rule that requires officials to resign at least 18 months before election day in this primary would not be applied, which allowed former PPP leader Han Dong-hoon to enter the race. Candidate registration took place on 14 and 15 April.

By 16 April, the PPP had selected eight official candidates; 11 candidates had originally registered. The party announced it would conduct a public survey and use opinion polls to shorten the roster down to four candidates on 22 April . A combination of opinion polls and a membership vote will be conducted on 29 April to determine two finalists; the results based on a combination of party member votes and public opinion polling, both weighted at 50 percent. The party’s nominee will be confirmed after a membership vote at the party's convention on 3 May.

== Candidates ==
=== Nominee ===

People Power Party Ticket
Kim Moon-soo
for President
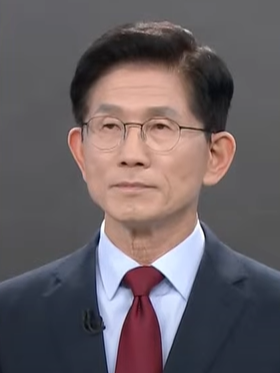
Minister of Employment and Labor
(2024–2025)

=== Finalists ===
Candidates for the 2025 People Power presidential primary
Name	Born	Experience	Announced	References
Kim Moon-soo	27 August 1951 (age 73); Yeongcheon	Minister of Employment and Labor (2024–2025); Governor of Gyeonggi Province (2006–2014); Member of the National Assembly (1996–2006)	9 April 2025	
Han Dong-hoon	9 April 1973 (age 52); Seoul	Leader of the People Power Party (2024–2024); Minister of Justice (2022–2023)	10 April 2025	

=== Eliminated in second round ===
Candidates for the 2025 People Power presidential primary eliminated in second round
Name	Born	Experience	Announced	Eliminated	References
Ahn Cheol-soo	26 February 1962 (age 64); Miryang	Member of the National Assembly (2013–2017, 2022–present); Chairman of AhnLab (1995–2012)	8 April 2025	29 April 2025	
Hong Joon-pyo	20 November 1953 (age 71); Changnyeong	Mayor of Daegu (2022–2025); Governor of South Gyeongsang Province (2012–2017); Member of the National Assembly (1996–1999, 2001–2012, 2020–2022)	14 April 2025	29 April 2025 (retired from politics, left the party)	

=== Eliminated in first round ===
Candidates for the 2025 People Power presidential primary eliminated in first round
Name	Born	Experience	Announced	Eliminated	References
Na Kyung-won	6 December 1963 (age 61); Seoul	Member of the National Assembly (2004–2008, 2008–2011, 2014–2020, 2024–present)	11 April 2025	22 April 2025	
Yoo Jeong-bok	17 June 1957 (age 67); Incheon	Mayor of Incheon (2014–2018, 2022–present); Member of the National Assembly (2004–2014); Minister of Security and Public Administration (2013–2014); Minister for Food, Agriculture, Forestry and Fisheries (2010–2011)	15 April 2025	22 April 2025	
Lee Cheol-woo	15 August 1955 (age 69); Gimcheon	Governor of North Gyeongsang (2018–present); Member of the National Assembly (2008–2018)	15 April 2025	22 April 2025	
Yang Hyang-ja	4 April 1967 (age 57); Hwasun County	Member of the National Assembly (2020–2024); President of National Human Resource Management Institute (2018–2019)	16 April 2025	22 April 2025 (endorsed Han)	

=== Declined ===
- Oh Se-hoon (Mayor of Seoul) (endorsed Ahn)
- Yoo Seong-min (former Member of the National Assembly)

== Campaign ==
=== Candidate announcements ===
Opinion polls showed that MOEL minister Kim Moon-soo had an early lead from Yoon's declaration of martial law onwards. Kim, a conservative and Yoon loyalist, is a fierce critic of impeachment measures taken against Yoon for his declaration of martial law. On 8 April, Kim announced his bid for the presidency.

A mix of other candidates were prominent in conversation as well. Mayor of Seoul Oh Se-hoon was considered a figure from the moderate conservative wing of the party. After briefly launching a run, he quickly backstepped, and declined to enter the field on April 12th. Yoo Seong-min, a prominent moderate and former candidate under the Bareun Party in 2017, also declined on the 13th to try a bid. He stated he was "furious that the PPP was focusing on vested interests rather than winning. The behavior of shrinking instead of expanding leaves me speechless."

Ahn Cheol-soo, one of just a handful of PPP assembly members who voted to impeach Yoon, was the first to confirm he was running on April 8th. He asserted that Yoon must leave the party and that the PPP must move beyond Yoon, also calling himself the candidate of scientists. Former party chair and Minister of Justice Han Dong-hoon announced his bid on April 10th. Han had shifted from the conservative to moderate tent of the party due to his anti martial law stance, and rumors he would have been indefinitely held in prison had Yoon succeeded. This came after rumored clashes with the Yoon government as chairman of the PPP.

A handful of other more conservative members entered to challenge Kim as well. Hong Joon-pyo, a former several time presidential candidate and Mayor of Daegu, announced he would run on the 14th, saying that he "considered it the final mission of my 30-year political career." Far-right assembly member Na Kyung-won, basing her support heavily on the extreme conservative and strict Yoon loyalist wings of the party, launched a bid on the 11th.

=== First round ===
Round 1 candidate vision conference, 18 April 2025.

The first round was conducted using exclusively opinion polls. The results were determined using surveys conducted by five polling agencies, with a combined total of 4,000 respondents, according to party's election commission. According to the BBC, each polling agency conducted a survey on 800 people.

Han criticized Hong for leaving party in 2020, while Hong attacked Han’s alleged misuse of party funds and what Hong considered to be an overemphasis on “image politics” on the part of Han.

Ahn and Na frequently clashed over Yoon’s impeachment; Ahn believed Yoon’s martial law order violated the constitution and hurt the party’s reputation, while Na defended Yoon’s actions and considered the impeachment unnecessary. The two were competing for fourth place in opinion polls that would allow the top four candidates to advance to the next round. Ahn also criticized Kim Moon-soo and Hong Joon-pyo for their anti-impeachment stance, visiting Daegu on 21 April. The day before, Ahn urged Yoon to leave the party.

Kim Moon-soo pledged to expand the nation's high-speed commuter rail network, while Hong Joon-pyo announced welfare reforms. Han Dong-hoon visited Gyeongju as Ahn Cheol-soo and Na Kyung-won traveled to Hong's native Daegu, a conservative stronghold. Ahn also promised to appoint businesspeople and entrepreneurs to his cabinet, if elected.

On 22 April, the party's election commission announced four candidates had been eliminates in the first round: Na Kyung-won, Yoo Jeong-bok, Lee Cheol-woo, and Yang Hyang-ja. Ahn had beaten Na for fourth place, advancing to the second round along with Kim, Han, and Hong. In accordance with the Public Official Election Act, the party refused to announce the ranking of votes in the first round results, instead listing the names in alphabetical order. In response to advancing to the next round Ahn stated, "I think what brought me to the semifinals is the public's expectation and hope to win this presidential election." Ahn also speculated that his diverse career experience may have helped him advance. Political commentator Lee Jong-hoon believed the result signaled a possible shift within the party towards moderate conservatism. Fellow commentator Choi Soo-young agreed with Lee, stating that Ahn making it to the second round showed the party might seek to move past Yoon and his impeachment, and towards a more centrist or center-right platform.

=== Second round ===
The second round will be held between 27 and 28 April, and will be conducted with the use of both opinion polls and a membership vote, both formats being weighted at 50% each. The final results of this round will be announced by the party on 29 April.

Han and Ahn continued to be labeled as "pro-impeachment", while Kim and Hong were considered "anti-impeachment" regarding Yoon Suk Yeol's removal from office. Ahn continued to style himself as 'the only candidate who can beat Lee Jae-myung'. Hong labeled Han as a "traitor" over his support for Yoon's impeachment after being supported "by former President Yoon Suk Yeol for 20 years". Han said he considered Yoon's martial law as illegal and continued to express no regrets about supporting the impeachment. In contrast, Kim remained very critical of impeachment itself, stating it was not in the national interest, and labeling the Constitutional Court's ruling as a 'hasty and political'. Hong meanwhile said he considered both the martial law order and the impeachment to be wrong. Ahn encouraged his fellow candidates and the party to issue an official apology over Yoon's actions.

Kim announced plans for a half-price monthly rent zone in university districts, expansion of supply of apartments and public housing, and distribution of co-existence housing for separated households. Han meanwhile said he would solve the problem of high urban density and concentration in the Seoul metropolitan area by constructing five new cities, creating a "Megalopolis" based around Seoul; both Kim and Hong said the plan was unrealistic. Ahn said he would move the capital to Sejong via a constitutional amendment. Hong promised to work with the medical community after Yoon's largely ineffectual handling of the ongoing medical crisis.

By 23 April, various lawmakers began joining the camps of various candidates, most notably that of Kim Moon-soo, whose support base consists mainly of former Yoon supporters. Han and Hong also attracted some lawmakers to their respective campaigns. Ahn's campaign meanwhile is being run primarily by political aides.

Four debates between two candidates, with one more four way debate on April 26, were scheduled. Attention focused heavily on Yoon and his legacy, with the April 25th debate devolving into mudslinging between Hong and Han. Hong continuously questioned why Han remained as head of the PPP after Yoon asked him to step down in January 2024, blaming the large defeat of the PPP in 2024 and, by proxy, martial law on Han. Hong stated that if he were leader of the PPP at the time, the "martial law and impeachment" would not have happened. Han shot back that "Someone like Han, who shows Yoon continued flattery, holds responsibility for the martial law." Ahn also accused Hong of not doing enough to not further reform within the party. Kim focused much of campaign on economic policy, vowing to boost exports and train 100,000 export specialists to help overcome the burden of tariffs imposed by the Trump administration in the United States. Hong also made pledges related to economic and fiscal conservatives, saying he would to seek significantly revise inheritance tax and minimum wage laws as President. Ahn said he would invest 5% of GDP in science and technology sectors, work to avert the risk of brain drain, and invest 10 million won in a national childcare fund to respond to low birthrates. Han dedicated a part of his platform to defense issues, unveiling plans for a nuclear submarine program and for establishing a "Korean-style four-axis system".

In the debate between Kim and Han on April 25th, Kim said he intended to ask if it was Han's fault that impeachment occurred and that the party now had to go through another election. In response, Han stated that, while he never doubted Kim's patriotism, the party cannot avoid the responsibility of martial law that it must face. Meanwhile, Ahn continued to call for the PPP to issue an apology to the public over martial law so the party can move on from the issue; he also clashed with Han over the issue of experience. He later had lunch with 200 Chungbuk National University students who opposed Yoon's impeachment, but supported Ahn in order to defeat Lee Jae-myung, who by then had become the official nominee of the Democratic Party. Han sought to achieve more than 50% of the vote share in the second round, so as to avoid a runoff vote and to give himself and the party more time to campaign against Lee and the Democratic Party.

=== Final round ===
Kim and Han advanced to the final round. According to Chosun, political analysts believed that the results of the second round indicated an attempt at consolidating "demands from the strong conservative and moderate factions around the candidate who demonstrated ‘clarity’".

== Debates ==
The first round of debates began on 19 April, following a candidate vision presentation the previous day. For the first set of debates, candidates were divided into two groups of four. Policy presentations and introductory forums were also held on 16 and 18 April.

=== Round 1 ===
The round 1 debates were criticized for including too many 'entertainment elements', which were subsequently removed for the round 2 debates.

==== Group A ====
Date	P Participant I Invited N Not invited A Absent E Eliminated				Link	Source
Date	Ahn	Kim	Yoo	Yang	Link	Source
April 19, 2025	P	P	P	P		

==== Group B ====
Date	P Participant I Invited N Not invited A Absent E Eliminated				Link	Source
Date	Han	Na	Hong	Lee	Link	Source
April 20, 2025	P	P	P	P		

=== Round 2 ===
Full second round debate, 26 April 2025.

Another policy presentation took place on 23 April, featuring Ahn, Kim, Han, and Hong. A total of four one-on-one debates were held on 24 and 25 April, preceding a debate featuring all four candidates that was held on 26 April. Each candidate chose who they were going to debate for the one-on-one sessions during the 23 April media day; Hong and Han both chose each other, so two back-to-back debates between both of them were held on the same day.

Date	P Participant I Invited N Not invited A Absent E Eliminated				Link	Source
Date	Ahn	Kim	Han	Hong	Link	Source
April 24, 2025	N	P	P	N		
April 24, 2025	P	P	N	N		
April 25, 2025	N	N	P	P		
April 25, 2025	N	N	P	P		
April 26, 2025	P	P	P	P		

=== Round 3 ===
Date	P Participant I Invited N Not invited A Absent E Eliminated		Link	Source
Date	Kim	Han	Link	Source
April 30, 2025	P	P		

== Results ==
The final round results saw Kim Moon-soo winning both the membership vote and in the opinion polls, for a combined total of 56.53%.

Candidate	1st Round: 22 April 2025 (Note: Conducted using exclusively opinion polls and surveys overseen by five polling agencies, with 4,000 respondents.)	2nd Round: 29 April 2025 (Note: Conducted using both opinion polls managed by five polling agencies that targeted 6,000 People Power Party supporters, and a membership vote consisting of 394,000 party members, each being weighted at 50 percent. The candidates’ voting rates and rankings were not announced.)		Final Round: 3 May 2025 (Note: Will be conducted using both opinion polls and a membership vote, each being weighted at 50 percent.)				
Candidate	Opinion Polls	Membership Votes	%	Opinion Poll	%	Membership Votes	%	Total points (%)
Kim Moon-soo	Advanced	n/a	n/a	TBD	51.81%	TBD	61.25%	56.53%
Han Dong-hoon	Advanced	n/a	n/a	TBD	48.19%	TBD	38.75%	43.47%
Ahn Cheol-soo	Advanced	n/a	n/a		Eliminated			
Hong Joon-pyo	Advanced	n/a	n/a		Eliminated			
Na Kyung-won	Eliminated							
Yoo Jeong-bok	Eliminated							
Lee Cheol-woo	Eliminated							
Yang Hyang-ja	Eliminated							
Votes cast		n/a	100.0		100.0	TBD	100.0	

== Emergency convention ==
On 10 May, Kim Moon-soo's nomination was cancelled and he was replaced by former acting president and prime minister Han Duck-soo, but was later reinstated as the party's nominee.

== See also ==
- 2025 South Korean presidential election
- Impeachment of Yoon Suk Yeol
