= Kim Young-hoon =

Kim Young-hoon may refer to:

- Kim Young-hoon (actor) (born 1978), South Korean actor
- Kim Young-hoon (politician) (born 1968), South Korean politician
