= Kim Moon-soo =

South Korean politician (born 1951)

- 김문수
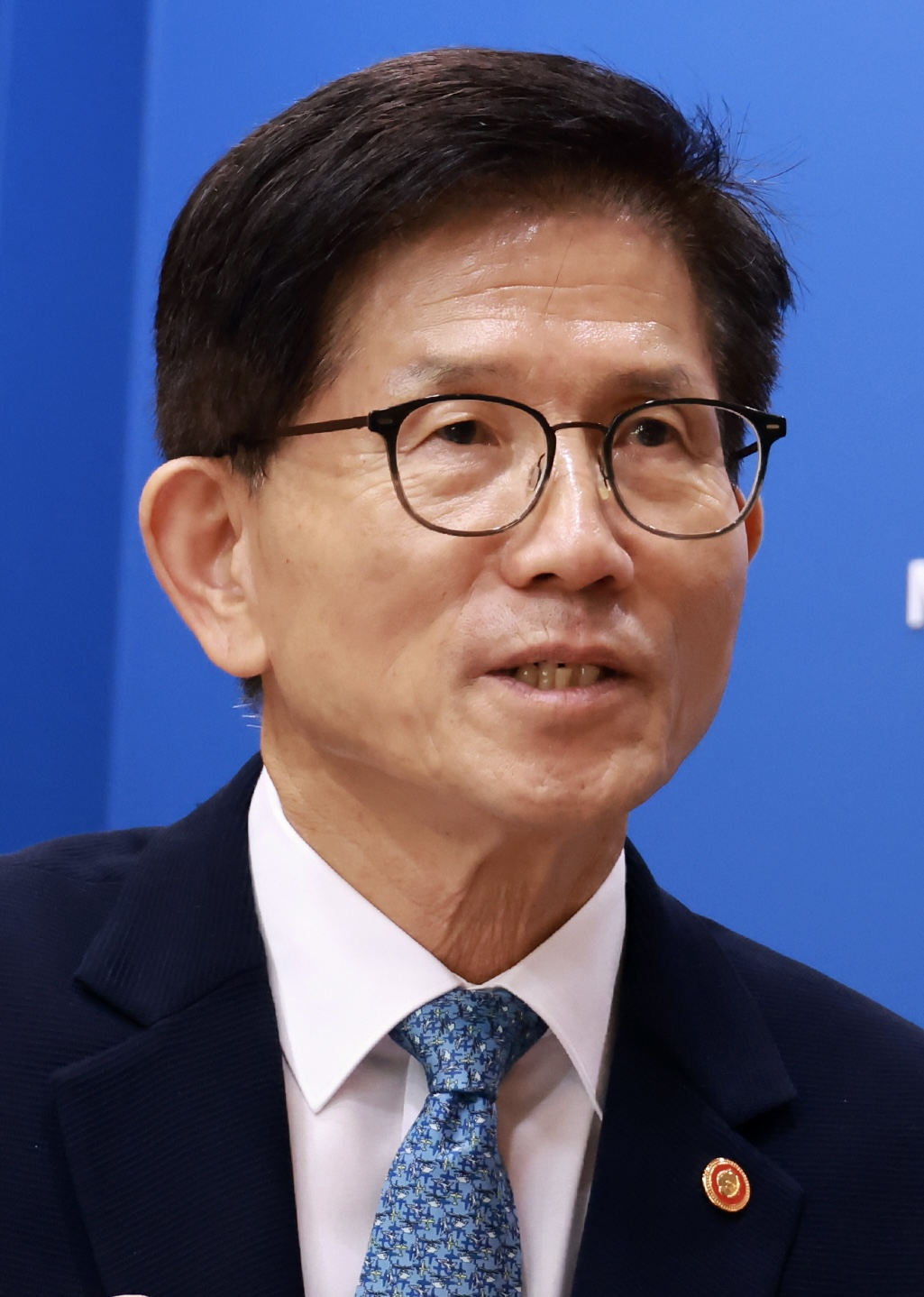
- Kim in 2024

Minister of Employment and Labour
- In office 30 August 2024 – 8 April 2025
- President: Yoon Suk Yeol; Han Duck-soo (acting); Choi Sang-mok (acting); Han Duck-soo (acting)
- Prime Minister: Han Duck-soo; Choi Sang-mok (acting); Han Duck-soo (acting)
- Preceded by: Lee Jung-sik
- Succeeded by: Kim Min-seok (acting); Kwon Chang-joon (acting); Kim Young-hoon

Governor of Gyeonggi Province
- In office 1 July 2006 – 30 June 2014
- Preceded by: Sohn Hak-kyu
- Succeeded by: Nam Kyung-pil

Member of the National Assembly
- In office 30 May 1996 – 24 April 2006
- Preceded by: Park Kyu-sik (Bucheon Nam, Gyeonggi)
- Succeeded by: Cha Myong-jin
- Constituency: Bucheon Sosa (Gyeonggi)

Personal details
- Born: 27 August 1951 (age 75) Yeongcheon, South Korea
- Party: People Power
- Other political affiliations: Liberty Unification Party (2020); Liberty Korea (until 2020); New Korea Party (1995–1997); Democratic Liberal Party (1994–1995); Popular Party (1990–1992)
- Spouse: Seol Nan-young (m. 1981)
- Education: Seoul National University (BA)

Korean name
- Hangul: 김문수
- Hanja: 金文洙
- RR: Gim Munsu
- MR: Kim Munsu
- Kim Moon-soo's voice Kim Moon-soo on expanding platforms between overseas communities Recorded 16 May 2025

Kim Moon-soo (Korean: 김문수; born 27 August 1951) is a South Korean politician and former labor activist who served as the governor of Gyeonggi Province from 2006 to 2014 and as the minister of employment and labor from 2024 to 2025. A member of the People Power Party, he was the party's nominee in the 2025 presidential election, losing to DPK nominee Lee Jae Myung.

Born in Yeongcheon, Kim graduated from Seoul National University in 1994, a degree he earned 25 years after first enrolling, having been expelled twice for participating in student protests against the government. He was arrested and tortured by the dictatorial government in 1980, but his indictment was later suspended. In 1986, Kim was arrested on charges of leading the Incheon 3 May direct election constitutional amendment struggle as a member of the Seoul Confederation of Labor Movement, was tortured, and served 2 years in prison. A former labor activist, he began his career in politics when he participated in the foundation of the People's Party in 1990.

In 1996, Kim was elected to the 15th National Assembly at Sosa District, Bucheon, as a candidate for the New Korea Party. After continuing to serve as a member of the assembly for another two terms, he became elected by popular vote in 2006 Gyeonggi gubernatorial election and consequently served as the governor of Gyeonggi Province from 2006 to 2014.

Following the impeachment of Yoon Suk Yeol, Kim launched his campaign for the PPP nomination in early April 2025. He defeated his closest rival, former party leader Han Dong-hoon, in the final round. On 10 May, Kim's nomination was cancelled and he was replaced by former acting president and prime minister Han Duck-soo, but was later reinstated as the party's nominee. He lost the general election to the DPK's Lee Jae Myung.

== Early life and education ==
Kim was born on August 27, 1951, in Yeongcheon, North Gyeongsang Province, as the sixth child of four sons and three daughters. After graduating from Yeongcheon Elementary School in North Gyeongsang Province, he moved to Daegu without his family, where he attended Gyeongbuk Middle School and Gyeongbuk High School.

In 1970, Kim entered the Department of Business Administration at Seoul National University but was expelled in 1974 due to his involvement in the National Democratic Youth and Students Union case. After that, he worked as a disguised worker at Guro Industrial Complex in Guro District, Seoul with Kim Geun-tae. He later graduated from Seoul National University in 1994, 25 years after his initial acceptance.

== Labor movements ==
In 1974, Kim served as the assistant cloth cutter at a fabric plant in Cheonggyecheon, acquiring national engineer's licenses for environmental management and safety management in 1977. He was elected as the Dorco Labor Union Leader of the Federation of Korean Metal Workers Trade Unions in 1978. He was arrested and tortured by the dictatorial government in 1980, but his indictment was suspended so that he could serve for Dorco again. In 1981, Kim married Seol Nan-young, a former female labor activist and former union leader of Sejin Electronics in Guro 2nd Industrial Complex, who had once provided shelter while he was on the run.

Kim served as the secretary of the Jeon Tae-il Memorial Society in 1985 and was arrested again for participating in the Incheon 3 May Protest for Constitutional Amendment for Direct Election System in 1986 when he served as a member of the direction committee for Seoul Confederation of Labor Movement. He was tortured and was imprisoned for two and a half years. In 1986, Kim was arrested on charges of leading the Incheon 3 May direct election constitutional amendment struggle as a member of the Seoul Confederation of Labor Movement, was tortured, and served two years in prison.

== Early political career ==
=== National Assembly (1996–2006) ===
In 1990, Kim Moon-Soo participated in the foundation of the Popular Party and served as chair of the Labor Relations Committee. That same year, he ran in the 1992 legislative election but was defeated. After joining the Democratic Liberal Party in 1994, he ran for as a candidate for New Korea Party in 1996, and was elected.

Following his election, Kim served as a member of the legislature, focusing on labor and environmental issues, as well as on transportation in the Seoul metropolitan area and childcare. Re-elected to the 16th and the 17th National Assemblies, Kim served for three consecutive terms as a member of the National Assembly. He served as the deputy floor leader for the Grand National Party.

Kim received the Green Politician Award in 1996, the National Assembly Environment and Labor Committee Best Legislative Activity Award in 1998 from the Korean Voters' Movement Association, and a plaque of merit in 1999 for legislative activities to help starving children and a plaque of appreciation from the National Association of Childcare Facilities.

== Governor of Gyeonggi Province (2006–2014) ==
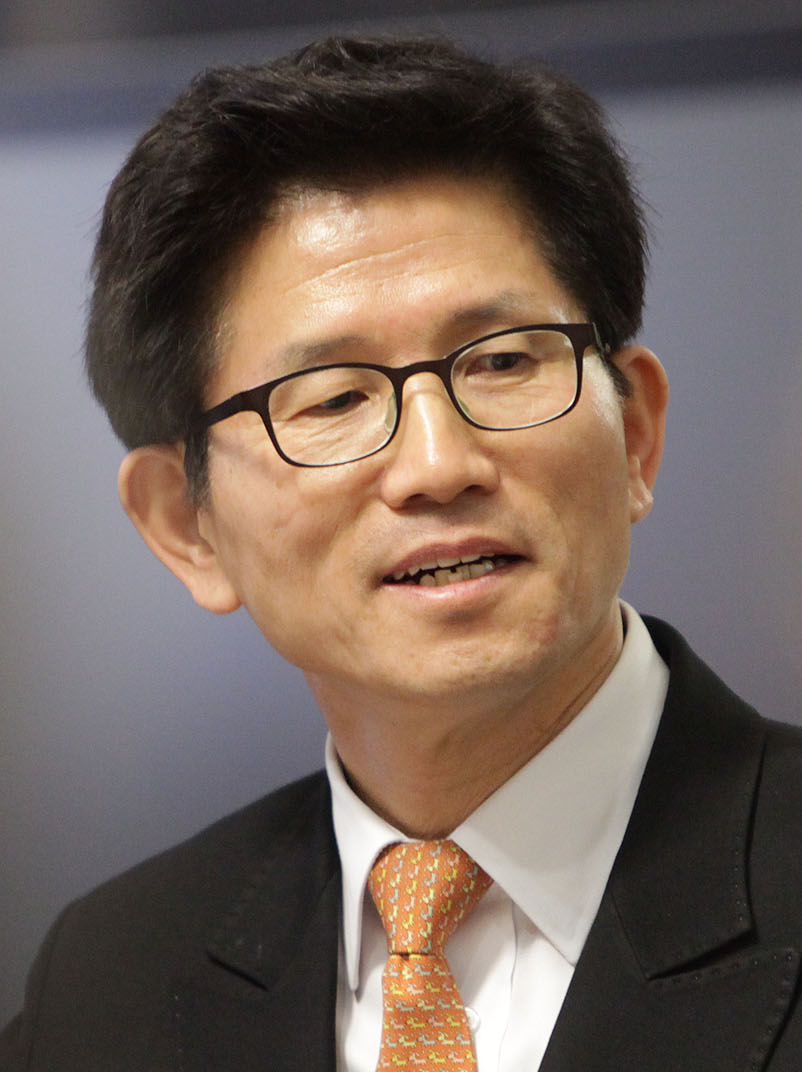
- Governorship of Kim Moon-soo; July 1, 2006 – July 1, 2014
- Governor: Kim Moon-soo
- Party: Grand National
- Election: 2006; 2010

After retiring from the National Assembly in 2006 to run for local government, Kim was elected Governor of Gyeonggi Province, taking office as the 4th Governor elected by public vote in July 2006.

In April 2012, Kim declared his presidential candidacy in the primary election of the Saenuri Party. In announcing his candidacy, Kim asserted that the nomination of Park Geun-hye should not be viewed as axiomatic, despite a decade of preparation for the campaign on her part.

== Activities before the Yoon administration (2014–2022) ==
He ran as the Liberty Korea Party's candidate for mayor of Seoul in the election in 2018. As a result of the election, Park Won-soon of the Democratic Party was elected, and Kim Moon-soo came in second with 23.34% of the votes. Ahn Cheol-soo of the Bareunmirae Party came in third. Afterwards, Kim frequently participated in a protest against president Moon Jae-in in 2019 when the Cho Kuk scandal broke out.

He founded the short-lived Liberty Unification Party on 31 January 2020, and began his activities as the party's representative for the legislative election. It was expected that the Gwanghwamun rally forces will be consolidated, and liberal right-wing values would be put forward in preparation for the general election.

On 18 March 2021, along with Kim Moo-sung and Lee Jae-oh, Kim demanded the unification of the opposition candidates for the Seoul mayoral by-election and the resignation of Kim Chong-in, the emergency response committee chairman of the People Power Party.

== Yoon administration (2022–2025) ==
In September 2022, Kim was appointed as the chairman of the Economic, Social, and Labor Council by President Yoon Suk Yeol. In August 2024, despite opposition from labor groups and the Democratic Party, Kim was appointed as Minister of Employment and Labor. During the 2024 South Korean martial law crisis, Kim disagreed with Yoon's decision to declare martial law, but refused to join other members of the cabinet in making a public apology after it was revoked by the National Assembly and opposed Yoon's impeachment.

== 2025 presidential election ==
Kim announced his candidacy for the 2025 South Korean presidential election on 9 April, five days after the Yoon's impeachment was upheld on 4 April, saying, "I am the right candidate for Lee Jae Myung's opponent." On 3 May, Kim was confirmed as the PPP's official candidate for President after winning the final round of primaries. He garnered 56.5 percent of the vote, beating out former Party Leader Han Dong-hoon. Kim stated in his victory speech: "I'll form a strong alliance with anyone to prevent a rule by Lee Jae Myung and his Democratic Party forces. I'll push for that in a procedure and method that our people and party members accept, and I'll ultimately win."

On 6 May, Kim suspended his campaign activities and accused his People Power Party of failing to support him. He then engaged in talks with independent candidate Han Duck-soo on fielding a common conservative candidate for the election on 7 May, which were inconclusive. Kim has claimed that the PPP and its chair, Kwon Young-se, has moved unilaterally to unify candidacies without consulting him. The PPP confirmed early on 10 May that they would outright cancel the nomination of Kim and instead nominate Han at an emergency convention the same day. Kim hinted at countermeasures, stating that "party democracy is dead" and that he would seek legal action against the party. Later that day, members of the PPP rejected a resolution designating Han as the party's candidate following an all-party vote, resulting in Kim's nomination being reinstated.

During the campaign, Kim issued a formal apology for Yoon's martial law declaration, saying that it was an inappropriate decision that triggered nationwide turmoil and that he would have advised Yoon against it had he known of the plan earlier. He also pledged to relocate the National Assembly, reduce the number of MPs by 10%, and establish a second presidential office in Sejong City. On 17 May 2025, Kim received the endorsement of Yoon Suk Yeol. He lost the election to Democratic Party candidate Lee Jae Myung.

== Election results ==
=== General elections ===
Year	Elections	Constituency	Political party	Votes (%)	Remarks
1992	14th National Assembly General Election	National (3rd)	Popular	319,041 (1.55%)	Not Elected
1996	15th National Assembly General Election	Bucheon Sosa (Gyeonggi)	New Korea	33,446 (39.19%)	Won
2000	16th National Assembly General Election	Bucheon Sosa (Gyeonggi)	Grand National	47,101 (61.62%)	Won
2004	17th National Assembly General Election	Bucheon Sosa (Gyeonggi)	Grand National	50,418 (52.94%)	Won
2016	20th National Assembly General Election	Suseong A (Daegu)	Saenuri	51,375 (37.69%)	Defeated (2nd)

=== Local elections ===
Year	Elections	Constituency	Political party	Votes (%)	Remarks
2006	4th Local Election	Gyeonggi (Governoral Elections)	Grand National	2,181,677 (59.68%)	Won
2010	5th Local Election	Gyeonggi (Governoral Elections)	Grand National	2,271,492 (52.20%)	Won
2018	7th Local Election	Seoul (Mayoral Elections)	Liberty Korea	1,158,487 (23.34%)	Defeated (2nd)

=== Presidential elections ===
2025 South Korean presidential election
Party	Candidate	Votes	%
Democratic	Lee Jae Myung	17,287,513	49.42
People Power	Kim Moon-soo	14,395,639	41.15
Reform	Lee Jun-seok	2,917,523	8.34
Justice	Kwon Yeong-guk	344,150	0.98
Independent	Song Jin-ho	35,791	0.10
Total votes		35,236,497	100.00
Democratic gain from People Power			

National Assembly of the Republic of Korea
Preceded by Park Kyu-sik (Bucheon City Nam District, Gyeonggi)	Member of the National Assembly from Bucheon City Sosa District (Gyeonggi); 30 May 1996–24 April 2006	Succeeded by Cha Myong-jin
Political offices
Preceded by Sohn Hak-kyu	Governor of Gyeonggi Province; 1 July 2006–30 June 2014	Succeeded by Nam Kyung-pil
Preceded by Moon Sung-hyun	Chairman of the Economic, Social and Labor Council; 30 September 2022–4 August 2024	Succeeded by Kwon Gi-seob
Preceded by Lee Jung-sik	Minister of Employment and Labour; 4 August 2024–9 April 2025	Succeeded by Kim Min-seok (Acting); Kwon Chang-joon (Acting); Kim Young-hoon
Party political offices
Preceded by Yoon Suk Yeol	People Power Party nominee for President of South Korea; 2025	Most recent
