= 2025 Democratic Party of Korea presidential primary =

South Korean party election

2025 Democratic Party presidential primary
- 10 – 27 April 2025

100% of party members voting 50% membership votes needed to win
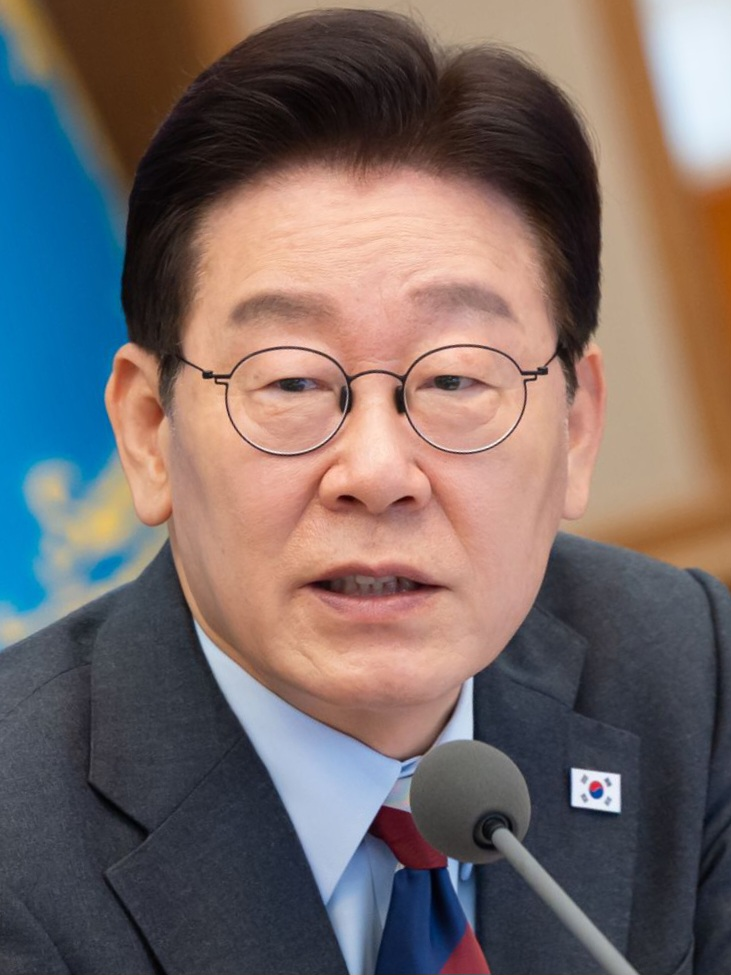

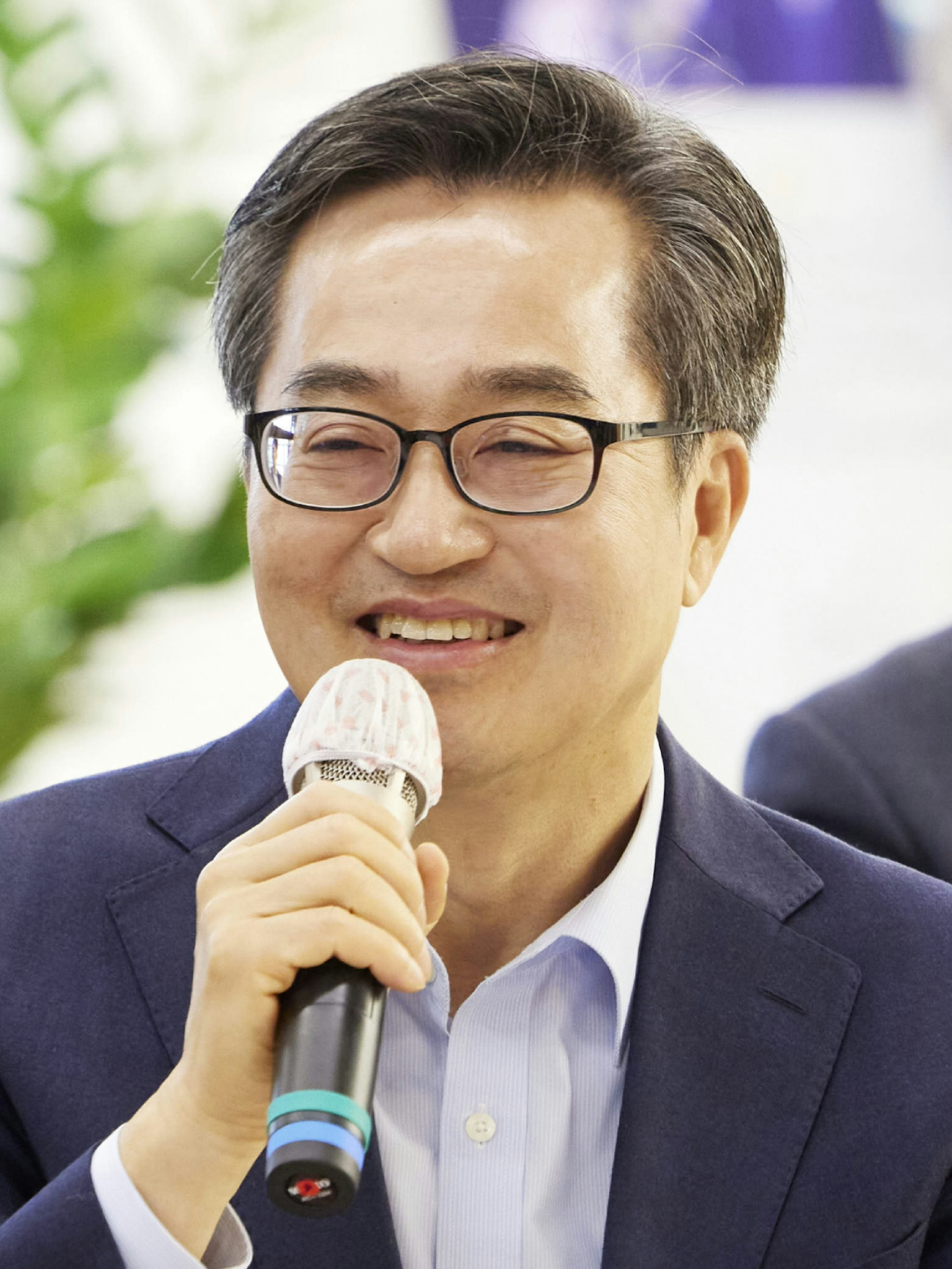

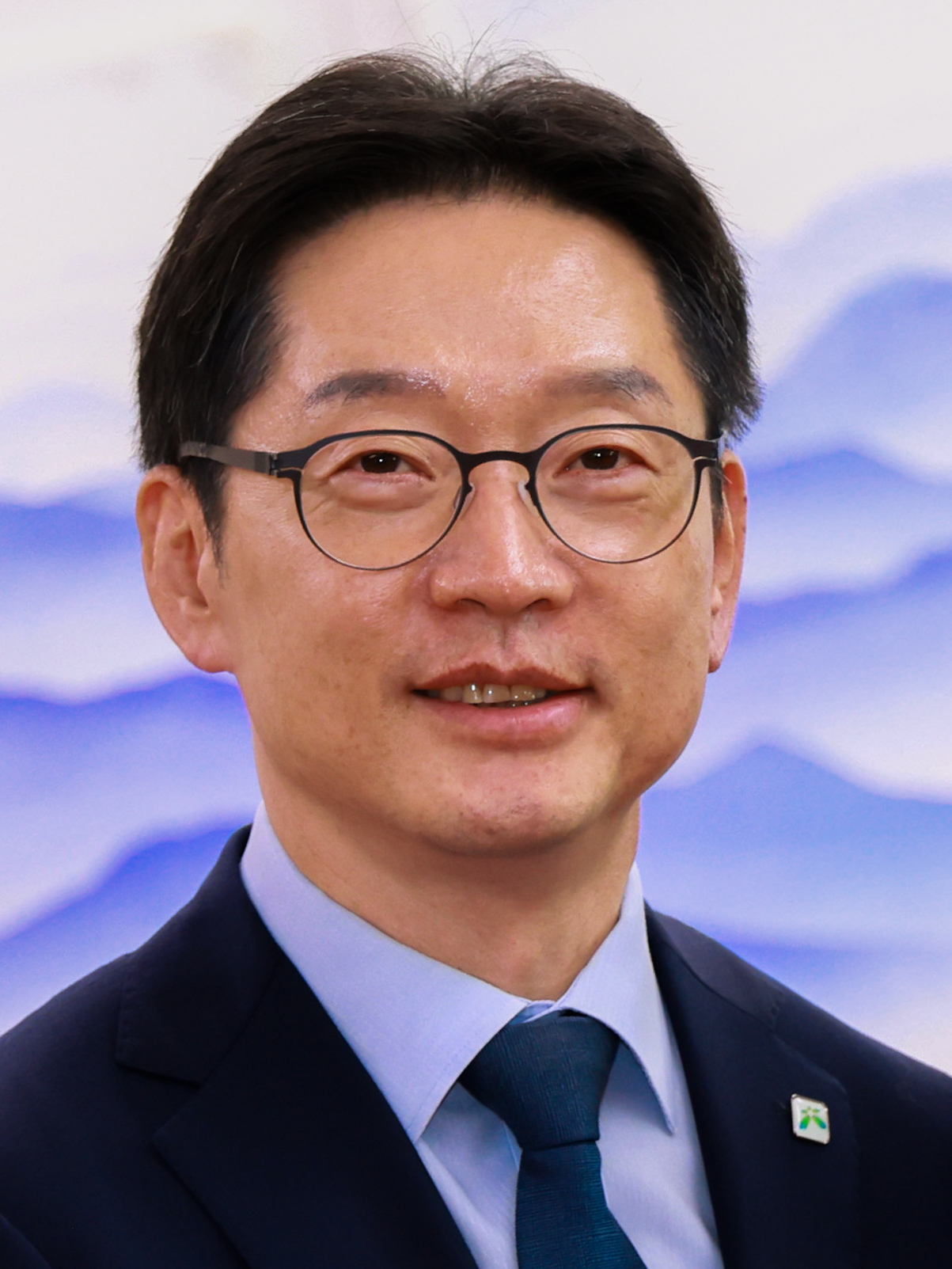
| Candidate | Lee Jae Myung | Kim Dong-yeon | Kim Kyoung-soo |
| Popular vote | 623,695 | 41,307 | 25,512 |
| Percentage | 89.77% | 6.87% | 3.36% |
Previous Presidential nominee
Lee Jae Myung
Presidential nominee
Lee Jae Myung

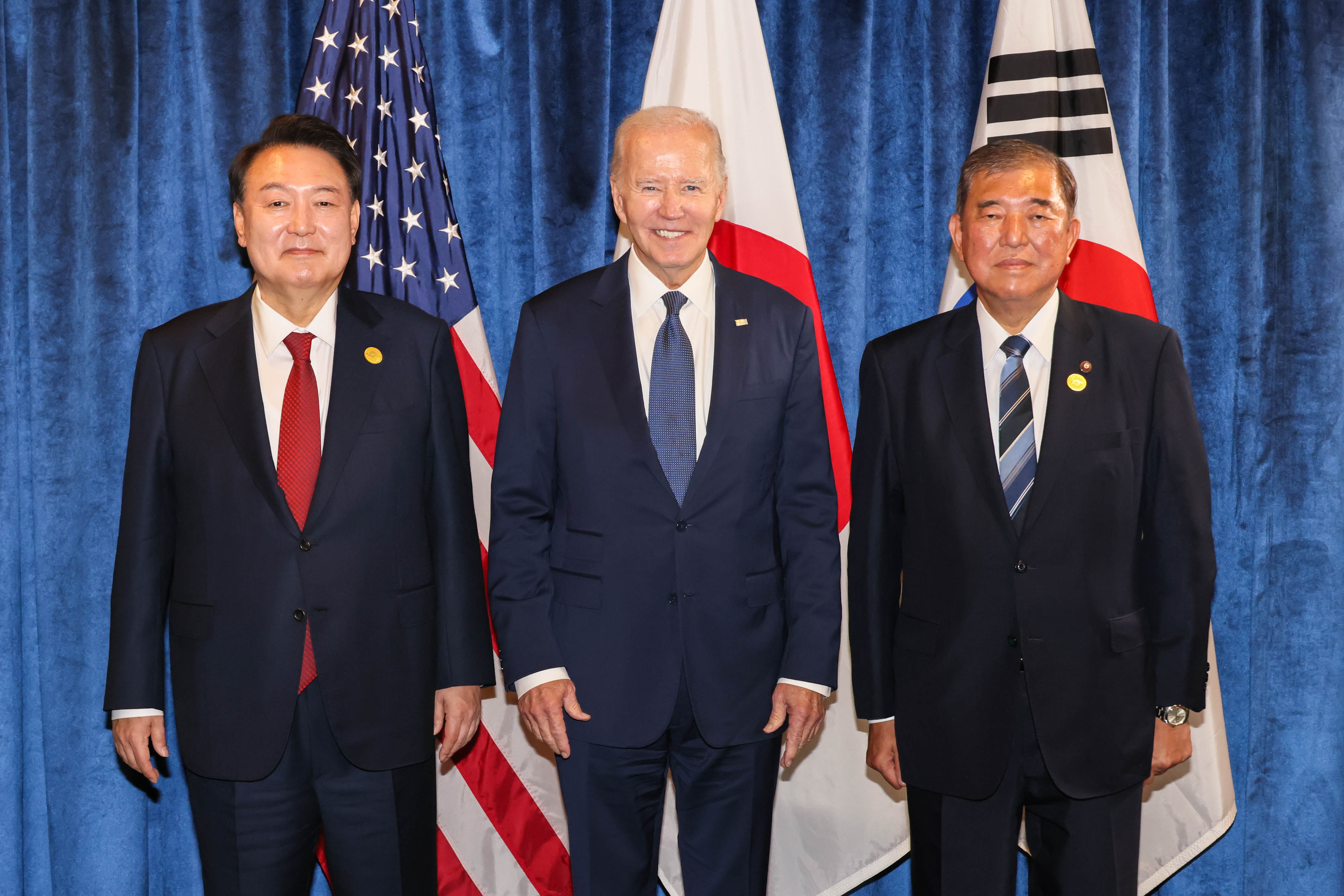
Yoon Suk Yeol (left, pictured in November 2024) declared martial law and was removed from office on 4 April 2025.

Presidential primaries were held by the Democratic Party of Korea from 10 – 27 April 2025 to select the party's nominee for the snap 2025 South Korean presidential election, which was held on 3 June. The primary was held after President Yoon Suk Yeol was impeached and removed from office on 4 April, immediately requiring a snap election to determine the country's 14th president. After Yoon's impeachment, three candidates declared their candidacy for the DPK nomination. The primary was held concurrently with the primary of the opposition People Power Party.

On 27 April, the party nominated former DPK leader Lee Jae Myung after a landslide victory in the primaries.

== Background ==
=== 2022 election and opposition status ===
On 10 October 2021, Gyeonggi governor Lee Jae Myung won the nomination for president, defeating three other candidates. Lee won a majority with 50.2% of the vote. In the closest South Korean presidential election in the country's history, Lee was defeated with 47.8% to 48.6%, losing by a margin less than 1%. Although defeated, Lee led the DPK to a strong victory in the 2024 parliamentary elections obtaining a total of 173 seats, while the PPP obtained 108 seats.

=== 2024 martial law crisis and impeachment of Yoon ===
Yoon declared martial law on 3 December 2024, leading to a political crisis. On 14 December, Yoon was impeached after the National Assembly voted 204–85, with 11 boycotting the vote. On 4 April 2025, Yoon's impeachment was upheld, terminating his presidency, and leaving a vacancy in the office. Acting president Han Duck-soo announced on 8 April that the election would be held on 3 June.

== Primary schedule and process ==
On 12 April 2025, the Democratic Party of Korea announced that its presidential primary would equally weight between votes by dues-paying members and a public poll conducted by two polling companies that would survey one million people. The final decision would be released on 27 April, following a full party vote on 14 April and an online vote by its central committee on 15 April.

By 18 April, there were three candidates; leader Lee, Gyeonggi governor Kim Dong-yeon, and former South Gyeongsang governor Kim Kyoung-soo, who was originally sentenced to prison in July 2021 and disqualified from running for public office until April 2028, but was pardoned in August 2024, disqualifying this rule.

== Candidates ==

Democratic Party Nominee
Lee Jae Myung
for President
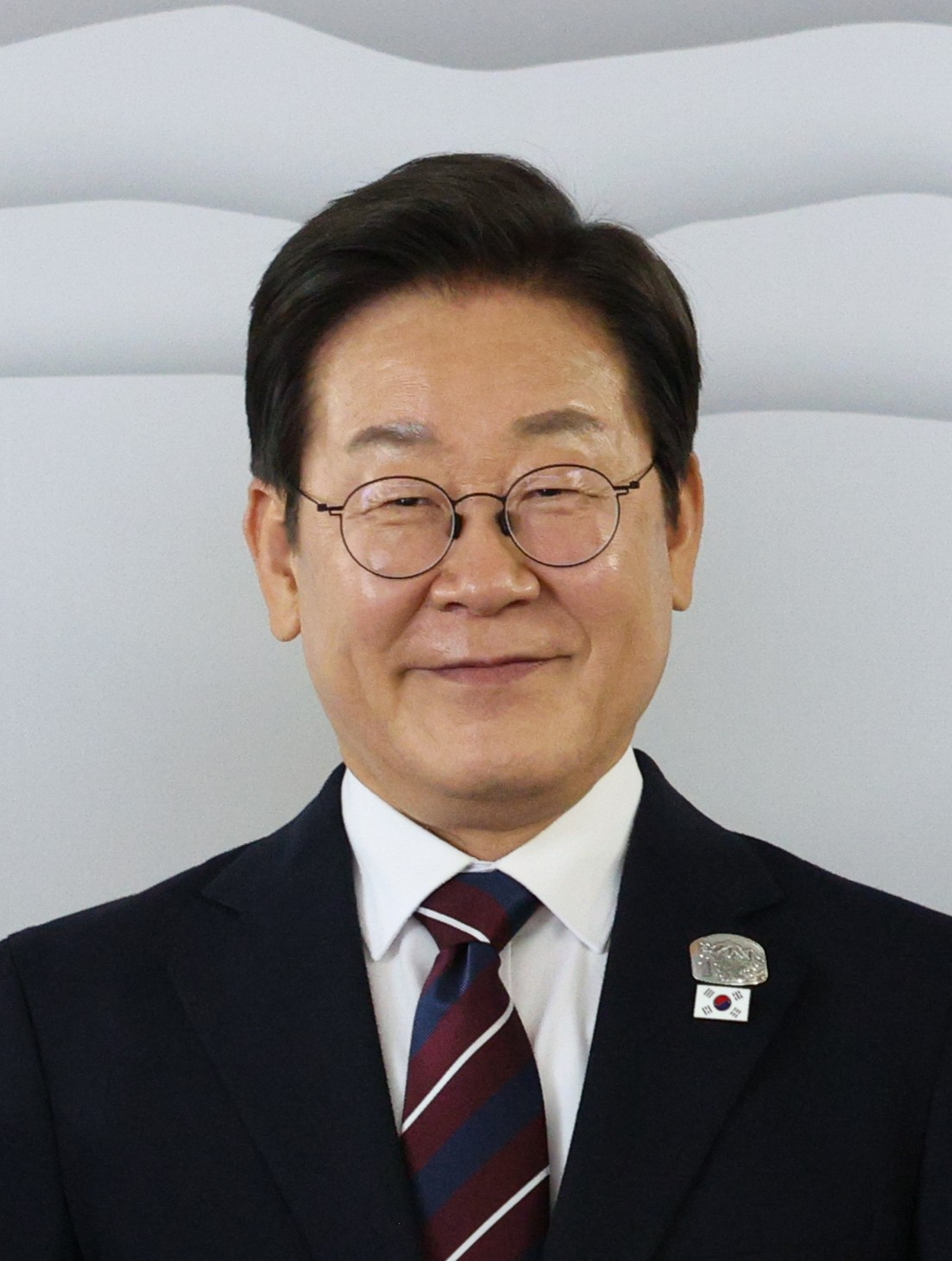
Leader of the Democratic Party

(2022–2025)

DPK leader (2022–2025) and Assemblyman Lee Jae Myung, resigned from DPK leadership on 9 April, announced his presidential bid on 10 April, and won the nomination on 27 April.

Candidates for the 2025 Democratic Party presidential primary
| Name | Born | Experience | Announced | References |
|---|---|---|---|---|
| Lee Jae Myung | c. 8 December 1963 (age 61) (Note: It is believed that Lee was born around this date; Lee's father registered his birth date late. Lee's legal birth date is 22 December 1964, but this was arbitrarily selected by his father.) Andong | Leader of the Democratic Party (2022–2025) Member of the National Assembly (2022–2025) Governor of Gyeonggi Province (2018–2021) Mayor of Seongnam (2010–2018) | 10 April 2025 | |
| Kim Dong-yeon | 28 January 1957 (age 68) Eumseong | Governor of Gyeonggi Province (2022–present) Deputy Prime Minister and Minister of Economy and Finance (2017–2018) Minister for Government Policy Coordination (2013–2014) | 9 April 2025 | |
| Kim Kyoung-soo | 1 December 1967 (age 57) Goseong | Governor of South Gyeongsang Province (2018–2021) Member of the National Assembly (2016–2018) | 10 April 2025 | |

Candidates who withdrew from the 2025 Democratic Party presidential primary
| Kim Doo-kwan | 10 April 1959 (age 66) Namhae | Member of the National Assembly (2016–2024) Governor of South Gyeongsang Province (2010–2012) Minister of the Interior (2003) | 5 April 2025 |

== Debates ==
=== First debate ===
On 18 April, the first debate began, which was televised.

| Date | P Participant I Invited N Not invited A Absent E Eliminated | | | Source |
| Date | Kim | Lee | Kim | Source |
|---|---|---|---|---|
| April 18, 2025 | P | P | P | |

=== Second debate ===
On 23 April, the party held its second televised debate. During the debate, the three candidates discussed constitutional amendments to either shorten presidential terms or allow multiple terms, and when the changes would take effect.

| Date | P Participant I Invited N Not invited A Absent E Eliminated | | | Source |
| Date | Kim | Lee | Kim | Source |
|---|---|---|---|---|
| April 23, 2025 | P | P | P | |

== Results ==
The results saw Lee Jae Myung win the nomination in a landslide, with 89.77% of the vote.

| Candidate | Votes | % |
|---|---|---|
| Lee Jae Myung | 623,695 | 89.77% |
| Kim Dong-yeon | 41,307 | 6.87% |
| Kim Kyoung-soo | 25,512 | 3.36% |
