= Yonam College =

South Korea private agricultural college

- Type: Private
- Established: 1974
- President: Kyoung-deok Seo
- Location: Cheonan, South Chungcheong, South Korea; 36.94699°N 127.15545°E
- Website: http://www.yonam.ac.kr/

- Yonam College
- Hangul: 연암대학교
- Hanja: 蓮庵大學敎
- RR: Yeonam daehakgyo
- MR: Yŏnam taehakkyo

Yonam College is a private agricultural college in South Korea. Its campus is in a rural area of Cheonan City, in South Chungcheong province. The current president is Kyoung-deok Seo. The entering class of 2003 numbered 520 students.

== Academics ==
The school's offerings are centered on agriculture and allied fields. The majors are divided among the divisions of Animal Care and Animal Husbandry, and the departments of Horticulture, Landscape Architecture, Floral and Plant Design, and Foodservice Industry.

== History ==
The school was established by the LG Yonam Educational Foundation, which is also the parent of the Yonam Institute of Digital Technology. It opened as Yonam High Technology School of Animal Husbandry in 1974. The school became Yonam College of Agriculture in 1998. The current name was adopted on September 1, 2003, exactly six months after Seo assumed the presidency.

== See also ==
- List of colleges and universities in South Korea
- Education in South Korea
