= Cheonan Ssangyong High School =

Korean name
- Hangul: 천안쌍용고등학교
- Hanja: 天安雙龍高等學校
- RR: Cheonan ssangyong godeunghakgyo
- MR: Ch'ŏnan ssangyong kodŭnghakkyo
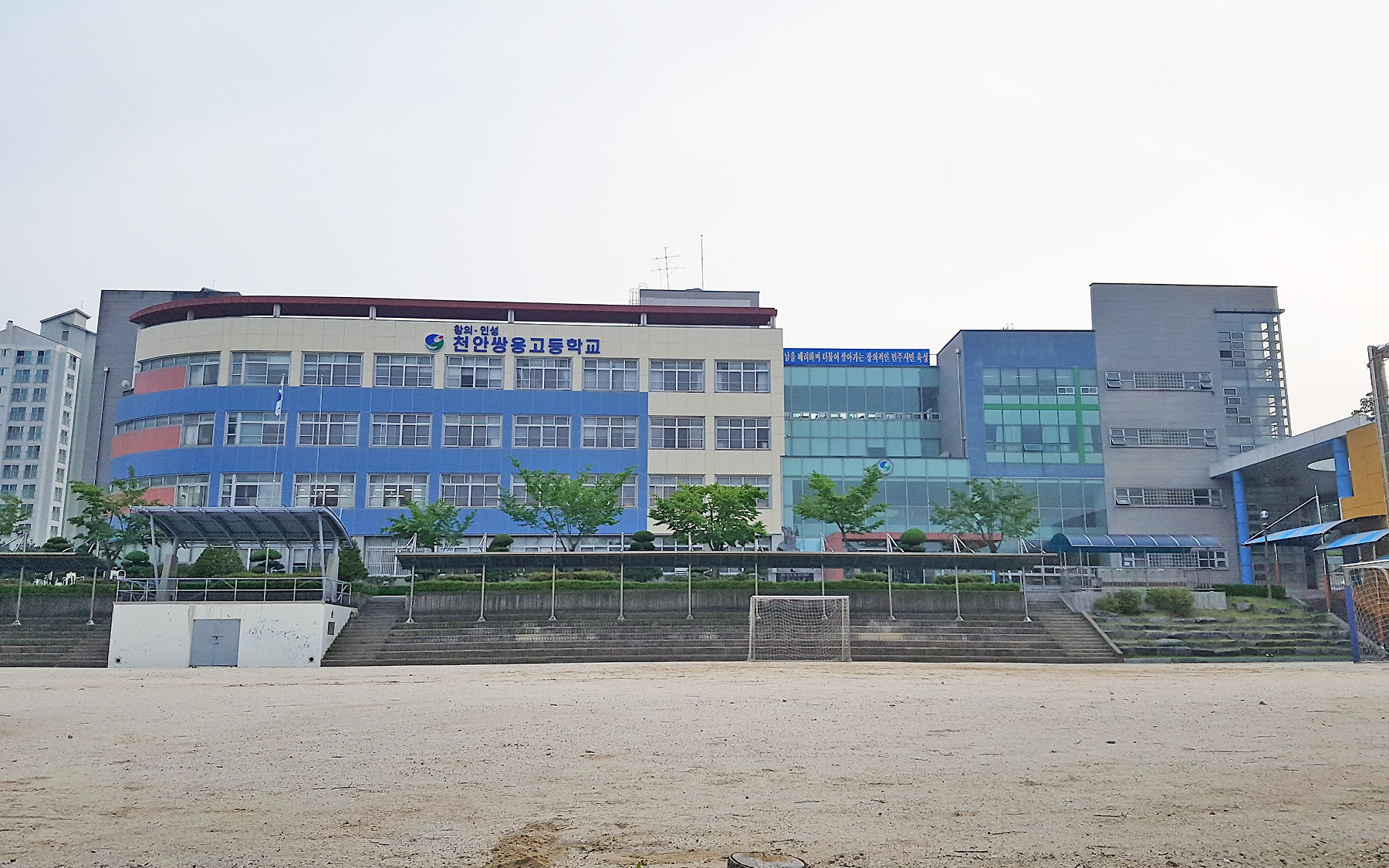

Location
- 10, Wolbong 7-gil, Seobuk-gu, Cheonan-si, Chungcheongnam-do, Korea; Cheonan, Chungcheongnam-do; Korea
- Coordinates: 36°47′17″N 127°06′50″E

Information
- Type: Public
- Established: 2004
- Faculty: 107
- Enrollment: 1540
- Website: http://www.sy.caehs.kr/

Cheonan Ssangyong High School (Korean: 천안쌍용고등학교) is a public high school located in Cheonan, South Korea.
