= Korea University of Technology and Education =

University in Cheonan, South Korea

Coordinates: 36°45′49.5″N 127°16′53.8″E

- Type: Private (Government supported)
- Established: 1991
- Faculty: 300
- Undergraduates: 3,600
- Postgraduates: 550
- Location: Cheonan, Chungnam Province, South Korea
- Website: www.koreatech.ac.kr

Korean name
- Hangul: 한국기술교육대학교
- Hanja: 韓國技術敎育大學校
- RR: Hanguk gisul gyoyuk daehakgyo
- MR: Han'guk kisul kyoyuk taehakkyo

Korea University of Technology and Education (KOREATECH, Korean: 한국기술교육대학교), is a 4-year university which was established by the Korean government (Ministry of Employment and Labor) in 1991 to foster practical engineers and HRD specialists and TVET (Technical Vocational Education & Training) teachers based on the educational philosophy of "Seeking truth from facts". KOREATECH offers 6 engineering and 1 industrial management courses. With the field-based learning activities, it has been ranked as one of the top tier universities among 4-year engineering universities in Korea (2017) and No1. in education-oriented universities for 9 years.

== History ==
History
2016	Mar	Opened the College of Work and Study in Parallel
2015	Apr	Founded IPP Hub Center – IPP Concurrent Work + Study System
2015	Apr	Founded Korean Skills Quality Authority
2014	Oct	Founded Online Lifelong Education Institute
2014	Aug	Achieved No. 1 Job Placement Rate nationwide at 85.9% (Ministry of Education)
2014	May	Sponsored 17.6 billion won over 5 year for CK-1 project
2012	Mar	Selected in LINC by Ministry of Education
2011	Nov	Promulgated English Brand ‘KOREATECH’ in commemoration of 20th Anniversary
2010	Mar	Founded Global Education Center (GEC)
2009	Jun	Won in Nationwide Economic Region Leading Industry HRD Project by Ministry of Education

- 2009
  - Ranked 1st in 'Education-centered university rankings in the 2009 JoongAng Ilbo Korean University Rankings '
  - Authorization obtained to operate the Remote Education and Training Center by the Ministry of Education, Science and Technology
  - Selected for 'the educational competency reinforcement project' by the Ministry of Education, Science and Technology for 2 consecutive years
  - Labor Administration Training Center established at the Third Campus
- 2008
  - "Engineering Education Certification" acquired for 13 majors from the Accreditation Board for Engineering Education of Korea (ABEEK)
  - Ranked 1st in 'the job placement rate for 2 consecutive years in the 2008 JoongAng Ilbo Korean University Rankings'
  - Selected for 'the educational competency reinforcement project' by the Ministry of Education, Science and Technology
  - Dr. Un-Ki Jeon appointed as the 6th president of KOREATECH
- 2007
  - Ranked 5th in 'the 2007 JoongAng Ilbo Korean University Rankings' (1st in job placement)
  - Selected as 'top tier university in the field of Computer and Electrical, Electronics & Communication Engineering' by KCUE (Korea Council for University Education)
  - 'KOREATECH-SAMSUNG Electronics Advanced Technology Education Center' established
- 2006
  - Second Campus opened to specializing in "industry-university cooperation"
  - Selected by the government to establish a master's degree program for Management of Technology (MOT)
  - Dr. Byung-Suk Chung appointed as the 5th president of KOREATECH
- 2004
  - Selected as 'the top tier university' by KCUE (Korea Council for University Education)
  - Intelligent Systems major in School of Mechanical Engineering established
- 2003
  - Graduate School of Techno HRD and the Graduate School of Industrial Technology established
  - School of Internet-Media Engineering and the Information Protection Engineering major in the Graduate School established
- 2002
  - Dr. Hyung-Nam Moon appointed as the 4th president of KOREATECH
- 2001
  - Selected as 'top 20 universities' in the 2001 JoongAng Ilbo Korean University Rankings
  - Three departments in the Graduate School (Architectural Engineering, Materials Engineering, Applied Chemical Engineering) established
  - Selected as 'the 2000 top tier university group in the field of Electrical, Electronics & Communication'
- 2000
  - Selected for 'TRITAS (Triangle of Technology Assistance for SMEs) Project' by SMBA (Small and Medium Business Administration)
  - Dr. Wok-Ki Kwon begins 2nd term as president of KOREATECH
  - School-Department system reorganized (4 departments and 1 school -> 5 schools & 5 departments)
  - Selected as 'the top tier university' by KCUE (Korea Council for University Education)
- 1999
  - 'the Business Incubator' launched by SMBA (Small and Medium Business Administration)
  - Selected as 'Excellent regional University' for the BK21 Project
  - Global Education Center launched
  - School of Industrial Management established
- 1998
  - Human Resources Development Institute (HRDI) established
- 1997
  - Five engineering departments offered (Mechanical Molding, Computers, Architecture, Mechanical·Materials, Applied Chemicals)
  - Library (the Dasan Information Center) opened
  - Construction of the auditorium completed
  - Master's Programs in Department of Mechanical Engineering and Department of Electrical and Electronics established
- 1996
  - Dr. Won-Ki Kwon appointed as 2nd president of KOREATECH
  - First Commencement Ceremony
- 1992
  - Dr. Nak-Joo Lee appointed as the 1st president of KOREATECH
  - First Matriculation Ceremony (240 undergraduate students)
- 1991
  - Ministry of Education approves project to establish Korea University of Technology and Education (240 students in 8 departments)

from https://www.koreatech.ac.kr/eng/sub01_03_02.do

== Campuses ==
=== Campus I ===
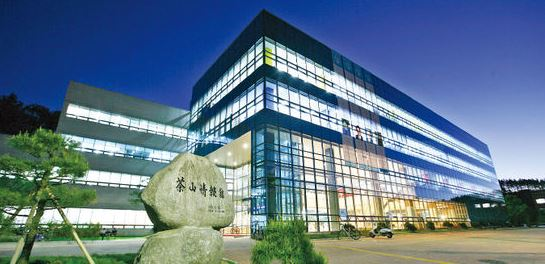

- Undergraduate School : 4,560
- New admissions 901 in 2015
- Graduate school 286(M.A., Ph.D.)
- Total faculty 300
- New admissions 115 in 2015
- Ratio of incumbent full-time professor ratio: 72%<
- Student-faculty ratio 28.8 to 1

Schools (Dept.)	BA	MA	Ph.D.
Mechanical Engineering	O	O	O
Mechatronics Engineering	O	O	O
Electric, Electronics & Communication Engineering	O	O	O
Computer Engineering	O	O	O
Industrial Design•Architectural Engineering	O	O	O
Energy•Materials•Chemical Engineering	O	O	O
Industrial Management	O	O	O
Human Resources Development		O	O

=== Campus II ===
Human Resources Development Institute Built in Budae-dong, Cheonan-si in 2006, the 2nd Campus (land area: 33,781m², floor area: 20,826m²) was the first in the nation to fulfill the function of industry-university cooperation.

- Training for Vocational Training Instructors
- Training for Professional Engineers & Technicians
- KOREATECH-SAMSUNG Electronics Advanced Technology Education Center
- Engineer Training for SAMSUNG and its partner companies

Human Resources Development Institute

Industry-University Cooperation Foundation

Founded in 2003, as one of the university's affiliated institutes, under the Law of Industrial Training and Industry-University Cooperation Promotion, the Foundation carries out comprehensive industry-university cooperative projects based on its dedication to specialized OJT-oriented employee education system, which KOREATECH is unique in offering.

- Operates lifelong competence development programs for industry and university employees
- Launches new industry-university cooperation projects
- Enhances employment opportunity through field-based trainings for students

Advanced Technology Education Center

Jointly founded with Samsung Electronics and Samsung SDI in 2006.

=== Campus III ===
Employment & Labor Training Institute. The former Korea Labor Training Institute was merged with KOREATECH. The Employment & Labor Training Institute was founded on 1 March 2009 as a specialty public sector training institute for providing employment and labor training to civil service and public institution employees, and teachers. It promotes the correct understanding and problem-solving capacity in regard to labor problems through methodical and professional education programs in the fields of HR and employment-labor administration.

=== Campus IV ===
Korean Skills Quality Authority(KSQA). Korean Skills Quality Authority (KSQA) is a regulatory organization in the Vocational Education Training (VET) sector, established on 1 April 2015 under the Ministry of Employment and Labor. The successful cases and systems of Australian Skills Quality Authority (ASQA) provided a benchmark for reforming the Korean VET system. With the foundation of KSQA, the functions of training endorsement, regulation, quality control and so forth formerly carried by three different organizations have been streamlined and dissolved into KSQA. KSQA, therefore, now plays an important role in the VET sector by regulating Registered Training Organizations (RTOs) and conducting quality control services in a national scale. KSQA operates five centers: Center for Training Organization Assessment, Center for Collective Training Evaluation, Center for Distance Training Evaluation, Center for Training Performance Assessment and Center for Illegal Training Administration.

- Review and evaluation of Vocational Training Institutes

Center for Training Organization Assessment

Center for Training Organization Assessment (CTOA) controls and determines the access to the VET market by assessing the reliability, operation capability, and trainees' satisfaction of training organizations and also conducts consistent policy researches in order to suggest ideas in policy making and ultimately improve the performance of RTOs.

Center for Collective Training Evaluation

Center for Collective Training Evaluation (CCTE) reviews over 100,000 applications for course registration submitted by RTOs every year. CCTE is also responsible for distinguishing exemplary training courses developed on National Competency Standards (NCS) so as to encourage RTOs to be responsive to the local and industry needs and ensure their inclusion to the realization of NCS based industry.

Center for Distance Training Evaluation

Center for Distance Training Evaluation (CDTE) is responsible for implementing and introducing new training methods in order to improve the flexibility of RTOs in course developing. CDTE also reviews over 20,000 applications for the registration of distance training courses every year and conducts consistent researches in order to encourage various ways of trainings to be implemented.

Center for Training Performance Assessment

Center for Training Performance Assessment(CTPA) is responsible for ensuring the constant improvement of VET programs and quality trainings by reviewing the performance of RTOs and trainee who have completed National Competency Standards (NCS) based training courses. CTPA also reviews the performance of central government bodies in charge of VET development and provides feedbacks and policy direction.

Center for Illegal Training Administration

Center for Illegal Training Administration(CITA), with statistical analysis system, monitors and analyses trainings and assessments delivered by RTOs. CITA also conducts post-registration audits in places where corruption is suspected. CITA is responsible for promoting the ethical atmosphere in the VET sector by preventing corruptions and unethical incidents. KSQA, with these five core functions, is determined to take the initiative in structuring the integrated system of the VET sector and aims to improve the quality of VET system with the vision of building a competency-based society. competence development training project and joint supervisory counseling on irregular training centers.

=== Post-graduation employment ===
KOREATECH’s post-graduation job placement was 85.9% in 2014 according to a recent survey conducted by the Ministry of Education.

=== Student life ===
Most KOREATECH students (nearly 70%) live in campus dormitories. There are amenities on campus such as a bank, a coffee shop, convenience stores, and fitness centers. All labs and lecture rooms are open to students 24 hours a day. There are two major student events: the "Han-Maek" Festival (Spring semester), and the Graduation Exhibition (Fall semester). During those times, the university is open to the public.
