= Joo Yang-ja =

South Korean politician (1931–2025)

- 주양자

Minister of Health and Welfare
- In office March 3, 1998 – April 30, 1998
- President: Kim Dae-jung
- Preceded by: Choi Kwang
- Succeeded by: Kim Mo-im

Member of the National Assembly
- In office February 7, 2000 – May 29, 2000
- Constituency: Proportional representation
- In office May 30, 1992 – March 2, 1996
- Constituency: Proportional representation

Personal details
- Born: January 1, 1931 Daegu, Keishōhoku Province, Korea, Empire of Japan
- Died: February 4, 2025 (aged 94)
- Citizenship: South Korea
- Party: United Liberal Democrats
- Other political affiliations: New Korea Party (until 1996)
- Profession: Doctor
- Religion: Buddhism

Joo Yang-ja (Korean: 주양자; Hanja: 朱良子; January 1, 1931 – February 4, 2025) was a South Korean politician and medical doctor. She served as the 25th Minister of Health and Welfare of the Republic of Korea and in the 14th and 15th National Assembly.

Joo was elected to the National Assembly in the 1992 election as a list candidate for the Democratic Liberal Party. She lost her seat on March 2, 1996, when she left the party to join the United Liberal Democrats, and was replaced by Jin Gyeong-tak. Joo was ranked 12th on the party list for the 1996 election and initially did not win a seat. She was appointed Minister of Health and Welfare in 1998. On February 7, 2000, she would return to the National Assembly, succeeding Chi Dae-sup as a proportional member when he left the United Liberal Democrats. Joo died on February 4, 2025, at the age of 94.
