= Cheonan =

City in South Chungcheong, South Korea

- Specific city
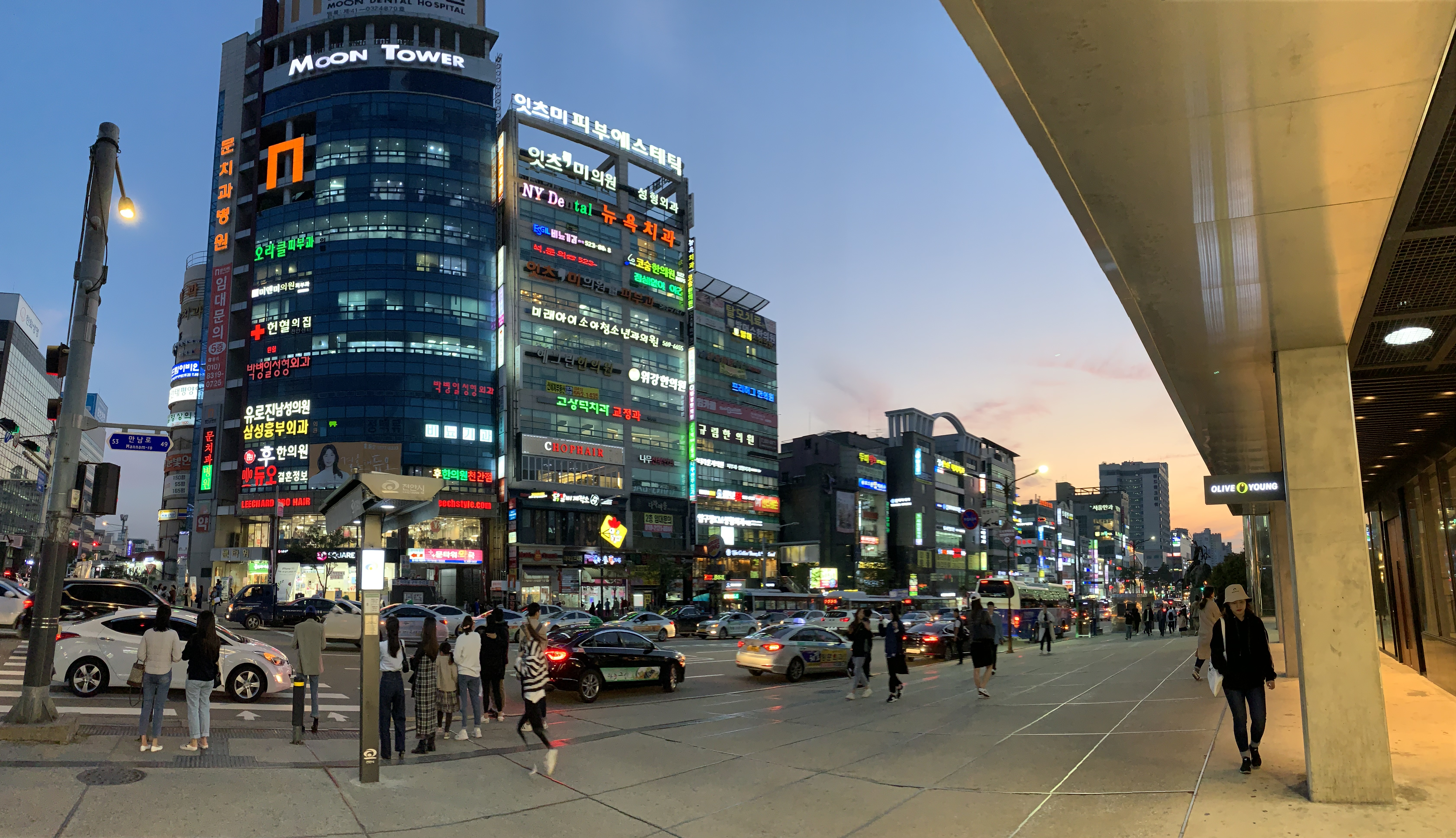
- Sinbu-dong

- Flag Emblem of Cheonan
- Interactive map of Cheonan
- Coordinates: 36°48′36″N 127°08′51″E
- Country: South Korea
- Region: Hoseo
- Administrative divisions: 2 gu, 16 legal dong, 4 eup, 8 myeon

Government
  - Mayor: Park Sang-don (박상돈)

Area
  - Total: 636.25 km^{2} (245.66 sq mi)
- Elevation: 22 m (72 ft)

Population (September 2024)
  - Total: 658,831
  - Density: 1,035.31/km^{2} (2,681.4/sq mi)
  - Dialect: Chungcheong
- Time zone: UTC+9 (Korea Standard Time)
- Website: www.cheonan.go.kr

Korean name
- Hangul: 천안시
- Hanja: 天安市
- RR: Cheonan-si
- MR: Ch'ŏnan-si

Cheonan (Korean: 천안; Korean pronunciation: [tɕʰʌ.nan]) is the largest and most densely populated city of South Chungcheong Province, South Korea, and the third largest city in the Hoseo region after Daejeon and Cheongju. Cheonan borders Gyeonggi Province (Pyeongtaek and Anseong) in the north, North Chungcheong Province (Jincheon County and Cheongju) to the east and southeast, Sejong to the south and Asan and Gongju to the west and southwest.

Cheonan has been called "the core city of [the] nation" due to its location 83.6 km (51.9 mi) south of the national capital, Seoul, in the northeast corner of South Chungcheong, serving as a transportation hub to the Seoul Capital Area and surrounding regions. Cheonan is connected to various freeways and railways including the National Highways 1 and 21, the Expressways 1-Gyeongbu and 25-Honam, and the city's Korail station serves the Gyeongbu Line and the Janghang Line, with services of the KTX. Cheonan is one of the furthest places from Seoul connected to the Seoul Subway Line 1.

== History ==
Cheonan has always been a major transportation hub of Korea because of its proximity to Seoul and its location near a gap in the eastern mountain range (Charyeong Range) that allows passage through to the major southeast centers of Daegu and Busan. Cheonan's Samgeori (meaning "3-way intersection") park has been noted as a strategic point of transportation and a place where culture has spread for a long time. It is the place where Samnamdaero, which starts in Seoul, parts, leading one branch of the road through to the south-eastern Yeongnam region (which includes Gimcheon, Daegu, Gyeongju and Dongnae), and leading the other through Gongju and Nonsan to the Honam region (which includes Jeonju, Gwangju, Suncheon, and Yeosu).

Due to its strategic location, Cheonan has also been an important postal center where early communications from the south converged before heading to Seoul, or where messages from the capital diverged into the southern regions. More formal and structured mail services later emerged with the construction of the city's first postal outlets, and the entire history of mail service in Cheonan (and in South Korea in general since 1883) is now on display in the country's largest postal museum in Yang-ji-mal in eastern Cheonan.

Cheonan was a relatively small town for much of the early half of the 20th century. As a transportation center, it was the site of an early engagement in the Korean War, the Battle of Cheonan. Then, in 1963 three municipal districts in the area that were growing in size were merged and promoted to the category of si, meaning city, by order of Law No 1176. Thus the City of Cheonan was born, comprising the populations of Cheonan-gun, Cheonan-eup and Hwanseong-myeon. Over the next two decades, the city grew in size by incorporating neighboring populations, including that of Byeongcheon-myeon in 1973. In 1975 the city renamed 10 branch offices to 10 dongs, representing the major administrative regions of the city. The city continued to expand, absorbing neighboring ri, myeon, and eup, including Pungse-myeon and Guryong-ri in the early 80s. Throughout this time, new neighborhoods to the southwest that were collectively known as Cheonan-gun, such as Ssangbong-dong, also grew in population, and in 1995 Cheonan-gun and Cheonan-si were merged into one large Cheonan-si. Larger dong that comprised the city were subsequently separated into smaller factions, such as Ssangbong-dong into Bongmyong-dong and Ssangyong, which itself was later separated into Ssangyong 1(il)-dong and Ssangyong 2(i)-dong (and then again into Ssangyong 2(i)-dong and Ssangyong 3-dong in 2003). In 2002 a city ordinance promoted the northern fringe village of Jiksan-myeon and the southern fringe village of Mokcheon-myeon into Jiksan-eup and Mokcheon-eup. This extended the boundaries of the city to a span of approximately 16 kilometers from north (at Jiksan) to south (at Mokcheon), and about 12 kilometers from Sunmoon University in the west to Mount Taejo on the eastern fringe. Including all of its administrative regions (see below), the city now covers a total area of 636.25 km^{2}.

== Geography ==
The city is flanked to the east by the Charyeong Mountains, and spills out over plains and rolling hills to the west. Some of the mountains in the city's vicinity include Malloesan (611m), Seonggeosan (579m), Taejosan (422m), Heukseongsan (519m), Gwangdeoksan (699m), and Manggyeongsan (600m). The city itself is generally flat, with only a few areas, such as Anseon-dong, that are built up on hilly terrain.

To the west is the city of Asan, to the north are the cities of Anseong and Pyeongtaek in Gyeonggi Province, to the south is the county of Sejong and the city of Gongju, and to the east of the city are the counties of Jincheon and Cheongwon in North Chungcheong Province.

Cheonan is growing as a gateway to Chungcheongnam-do and a city behind the Seoul metropolitan area, located 83.6 kilometers south of Seoul on the highway. Gyeongbu Line connects north and south, and Janghang Line connects to the southwest. Land routes connect to Seoul, Daejeon, Sejong, Gongju, Asan, Jincheon, Pyeongtaek, and Anseong.

=== Climate ===
Cheonan has a humid continental climate (Köppen: Dwa), but can be considered a borderline humid subtropical climate (Köppen: Cwa) using the −3 °C (27 °F) isotherm. The climate is similar to that of neighboring Seoul, Suwon, or Daejeon, and is considered temperate Eastern margin with periods of monsoon. Cheonan experiences a four-season weather cycle, with moderately high summer temperatures and moderately low temperatures and snowfall in winter.

Climate data for Cheonan (1991–2020 normals, extremes 1972–present)
| Month | Jan | Feb | Mar | Apr | May | Jun | Jul | Aug | Sep | Oct | Nov | Dec | Year |
|---|---|---|---|---|---|---|---|---|---|---|---|---|---|
| Record high °C (°F) | 16.5 (61.7) | 22.2 (72.0) | 26.9 (80.4) | 31.2 (88.2) | 33.9 (93.0) | 34.8 (94.6) | 37.7 (99.9) | 37.8 (100.0) | 34.1 (93.4) | 28.7 (83.7) | 25.3 (77.5) | 18.5 (65.3) | 37.8 (100.0) |
| Mean daily maximum °C (°F) | 3.0 (37.4) | 5.8 (42.4) | 11.8 (53.2) | 18.7 (65.7) | 24.1 (75.4) | 27.5 (81.5) | 29.5 (85.1) | 30.2 (86.4) | 26.1 (79.0) | 20.4 (68.7) | 12.8 (55.0) | 5.2 (41.4) | 17.9 (64.2) |
| Daily mean °C (°F) | −2.4 (27.7) | 0.0 (32.0) | 5.3 (41.5) | 11.7 (53.1) | 17.5 (63.5) | 21.8 (71.2) | 24.9 (76.8) | 25.2 (77.4) | 20.2 (68.4) | 13.4 (56.1) | 6.5 (43.7) | −0.2 (31.6) | 12.0 (53.6) |
| Mean daily minimum °C (°F) | −7.5 (18.5) | −5.4 (22.3) | −0.8 (30.6) | 4.9 (40.8) | 11.4 (52.5) | 16.8 (62.2) | 21.2 (70.2) | 21.3 (70.3) | 15.2 (59.4) | 7.4 (45.3) | 1.0 (33.8) | −5.1 (22.8) | 6.7 (44.1) |
| Record low °C (°F) | −23.9 (−11.0) | −19.9 (−3.8) | −10.4 (13.3) | −5.2 (22.6) | 2.0 (35.6) | 6.9 (44.4) | 12.5 (54.5) | 12.1 (53.8) | 3.0 (37.4) | −4.3 (24.3) | −10.4 (13.3) | −18.7 (−1.7) | −23.9 (−11.0) |
| Average precipitation mm (inches) | 19.0 (0.75) | 27.0 (1.06) | 38.3 (1.51) | 67.5 (2.66) | 78.7 (3.10) | 127.0 (5.00) | 284.1 (11.19) | 299.7 (11.80) | 146.4 (5.76) | 55.5 (2.19) | 47.6 (1.87) | 27.9 (1.10) | 1,218.7 (47.98) |
| Average precipitation days (≥ 0.1 mm) | 7.4 | 6.2 | 7.4 | 7.9 | 7.6 | 8.5 | 14.1 | 13.7 | 8.8 | 6.0 | 9.1 | 9.6 | 106.3 |
| Average snowy days | 8.7 | 5.3 | 2.1 | 0.1 | 0.0 | 0.0 | 0.0 | 0.0 | 0.0 | 0.1 | 2.4 | 7.2 | 25.9 |
| Average relative humidity (%) | 68.5 | 63.8 | 61.1 | 58.2 | 62.3 | 69.1 | 77.2 | 76.7 | 74.0 | 71.2 | 70.0 | 69.5 | 68.5 |
| Mean monthly sunshine hours | 167.2 | 178.4 | 211.6 | 221.5 | 241.5 | 207.3 | 160.5 | 184.0 | 179.8 | 204.8 | 159.2 | 155.5 | 2,271.3 |
| Percentage possible sunshine | 55.6 | 60.0 | 58.5 | 59.2 | 56.9 | 50.4 | 41.3 | 49.3 | 53.3 | 61.5 | 53.4 | 53.3 | 54.2 |
Source: Korea Meteorological Administration (snow and percent sunshine 1981–2010)

The average temperature in the city is 12.5 °C, with a recorded high of 34.2 °C and a low of -13.4 °C.

== Symbols ==
- City Tree: Weeping willow
- City Flower: Golden bell flower
- City Bird: Dove
- City Animal: Dragon

== Education ==
The city has been designated the high tech headquarters for Korea. A number of colleges and universities are located there, including:

- Baekseok Culture University (formerly Cheonan College of Foreign Studies)
- Baekseok University (formerly Cheonan University)
- Cheonan Yonam College
- Dankook University (satellite campus)
- Hoseo University (satellite campus)
- Kongju National University's Cheonan campus - College of Engineering (formerly Cheonan National Technical College)
- Korea Nazarene University
- Korea University of Technology and Education
- Namseoul University
- Sangmyung University (satellite campus)
- Sun Moon University (satellite campus)
- Soonchunhyang University

=== High schools ===
- Cheonan Ssangyong High School
- Bokja Girl's High School
- Cheonan Wolbong High School

== Cultural infrastructure ==
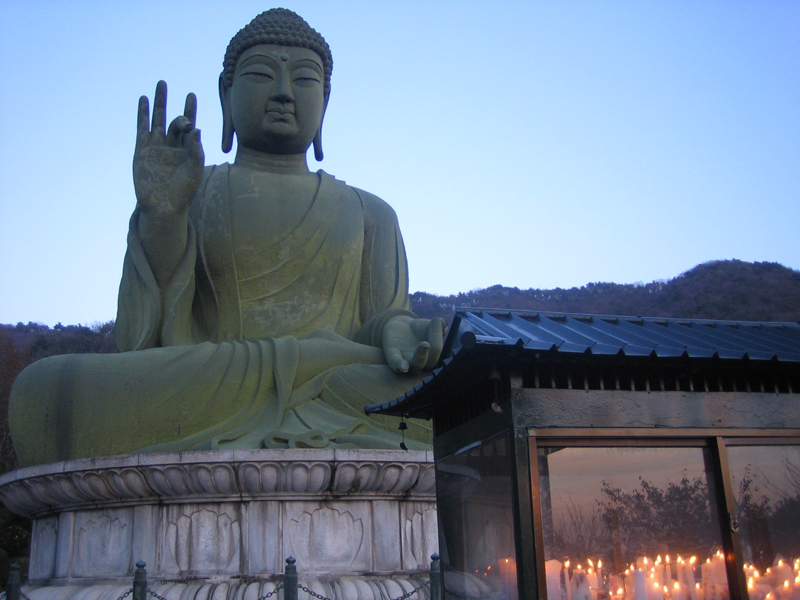
Joabulsang bronzed Buddha.

=== Museums ===
The Independence Hall of Korea is a visual history of the struggle for independence in Korea. Opened on August 15, 1987 and made possible by private donations, it is a meant both as a reminder of Korea's colonial past and as a means of building nationalist spirit. The hall stands on 980 acres (4.0 km^{2}) of landscaped grounds. As well as the exhibits, visitors can see the Grand Hall of the Nation, the Monument to the Nation, and the Unification Bell.

Cheonan's Postal Museum displays postal artifacts and material dating back to 1884, when the first postal services began. The entire history of the Korean postal service is on display, complete with photographs and letter carrying paraphernalia. The museum was not constructed here, but rather moved from Seoul in February 2004 to its current home in the Ministry of Information and Communication Officials Training Institute in Cheonan.

=== Temples ===
Gagwonsa Buddhist temple is located on Mt. Taejosan. Located on the temple grounds is a large bronze sitting Buddha, which is 15m high, 30m in circumference, and weighs over 60 tonnes. The Buddha sits with the peak of Mt. Taejosan directly behind it, and faces west out over the city and valley. Worshippers and tourists alike climb the steep stairs from the base of the mountain.

Mt. Taejosan is also home to the smaller Seong-bul-sa temple.

In the southwest of the city, near the city's border with neighboring Asan, sits Hyeonchung-sa Temple, a large complex that houses a main temple and an elaborate garden. The temple was built by Confucian scholars and is a shrine to Admiral Yi Sun-sin (his grave is located on the grounds). The temple and grounds also house a number of National Treasures.

=== Parks ===
Samgeori park has been a strategic point of transportation and a place where culture has spread for a long time. The Samnamdaero, which starts in Seoul, parts here. One branch of the road leads to the Yeongnam region. The other branch leads to the Honam region.

Haneulgeori is a resting area for the animal residents of Cheonan Samgeori Park, and it provides scenery for visitors with its willow trees and small pond.

Taejosan Park is located at Mt. Taejosan. The park covers an area of over 327,000 square meters. Visitors there may find a sculpture park, six camp sites, a grass field, tennis courts, and an outdoor performance area. There are many facilities for youths and families, and residents use the area for rest and relaxation. For hikers and day-walkers, there is also a very extensive trail network. The park also encompasses the Joabulsang Bronze Buddha statue and the Gagwonsa Buddhist Temple.

=== Galleries ===
Arario Gallery, reopened in 2002, is an addition to a revitalized Shinbu-dong area, which has become the central business district of Cheonan. The gallery itself showcases contemporary art from Korean and international artists. Organic works, including those painted with raw materials or organic substances (like fruit and vegetables) are the norm. The gallery's stated mission is to provide a special place for people of all ages and background to easily view and learn about art. There is also an installation of Damien Hirst's "Hymn" in a glass box constructed as a part of the building.

=== Sports ===
The city is home to association football club Cheonan FC of the National League. They play at the Cheonan Football Center. There are basketball courts, especially in the Ssangyong-dong area, as well as public tennis courts, and plenty of driving ranges for golf enthusiasts.

Cheonan is also home to a 26,000 capacity stadium called the Cheonan Baekseok Stadium. It hosted the South Korea national football team vs. Mali in October 2013.

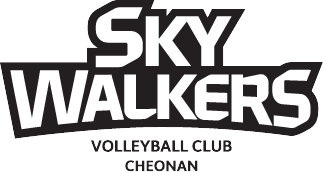
Hyundai skywalkers

Cheonan is home to volleyball club Cheonan Hyundai Capital Skywalkers. Cheonan Yu-gwansun Stadium is their home ground. Now Cheonan is called "Volleyball metropolitan city" because of their popularity.

=== Food ===
Cheonan is known for small walnut-shaped and flavored cakes, or hodugwaja, which are produced in the area. It is common when leaving from or passing through Cheonan Station by train to see many merchants selling hodugwaja.

Cheonan is also known for several agricultural products including melons, grapes and ya pears.

=== Festivals ===
Cheonan's most well-known festival is Heungtaryeong Festival (흥타령 축제). 흥 means pleasure and joy in the Korean language, and usually refers to Korean music.

The dancing festival is the essence of the events from B-boy to traditional dances from India, Africa, Australia, Ukraine. Many teams also participate in the festival from 17 other nations such as China and Japan.

The festival started in 2003 and it received the position of "prepared" and "promising" in 2006 and 2007, respectively. As of 26 December 2007, the festival was promoted to the degree of "excellent festival" or "우수축제."

To mark the historic March 1 Independence Movement, characterized in Cheonan by Yu Gwansun, each year a re-enactment of independence protests is staged at Aunae Marketplace. The popular movement began with the lighting of 24 beacons at Mt. Maebongsan and other mountains on March 31, 1919. The following day, 3,000 people gathered at Aunae Marketplace and protested for independence. Japanese security forces arrived and 19 people were shot dead on the spot, including Yu Gwansun's parents, with dozens more injured. These days people gather peacefully together in remembrance. Then a torch parade, symbolizing the lit beacons, slowly creeps from Aunae Market place through Byeongcheon and on to the Yu Gwansun Memorial.

On the eighth day of the fourth month of the Lunar Calendar each year, Buddhists celebrate the first coming of Buddha. In Cheonan, local temples decorate their buildings and grounds with illuminated paper lanterns, and much of the city centre is closed to traffic for a parade followed by musical acts and a traditional drumming show. Koreans often dress in their Hanboks, a traditional Korean costume, and spend the day with friends and family wandering through the pedestrian-friendly streets and lanes on the city core.

== Transportation ==
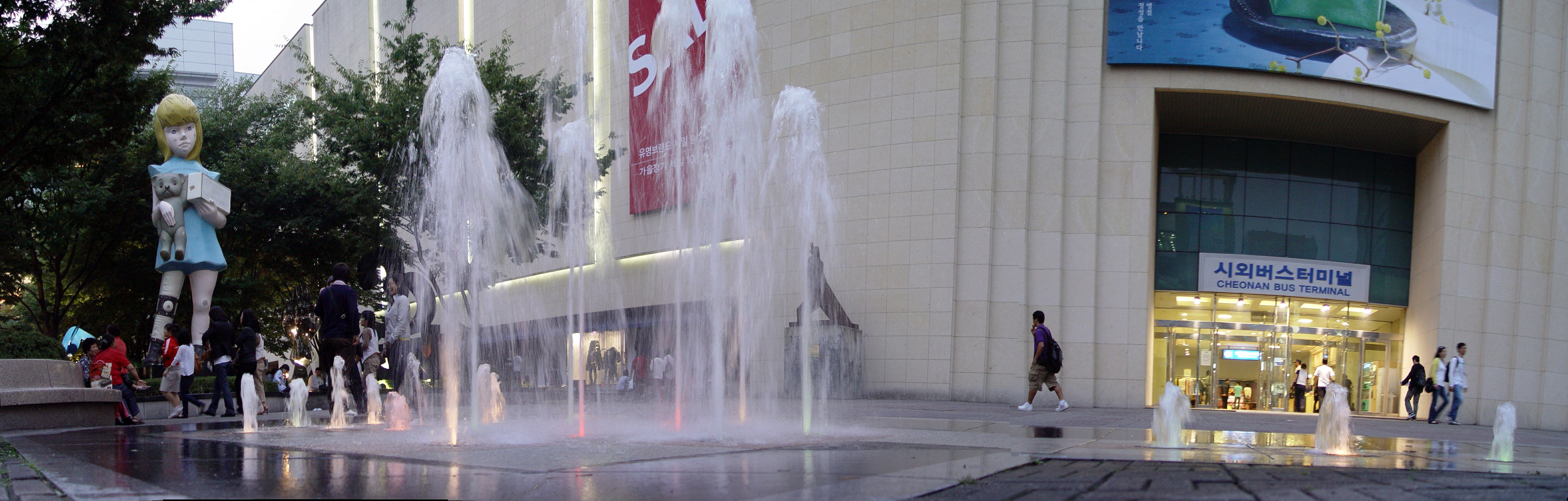
Cheonan Bus Terminal

The city is very well-connected to Seoul by road but also by train through two train stations. The first is Cheonan Station and the second, (served by the KTX high speed railway) is Cheonan-Asan Station. Different areas in Cheonan are also served by Seoul Subway Line 1.

== Economy ==
The local economy is fuelled to a great extent by tech sector companies in the area. Large national corporations such as Samsung, LG Group, Corning Inc., and several technology companies all have operations in Cheonan. The large number of universities also contributes to an influx of spending, as students from around Korea flock here for eight months of the year.

== Administrative districts and divisions ==
Cheonan is divided into 2 gu, and 16 administrative dong (subdivided into 30 distinct legal dong), 4 eup and 8 myeon.

The divisions of Dongnam District (Southeast) and Seobuk District (Northwest) are shown here:

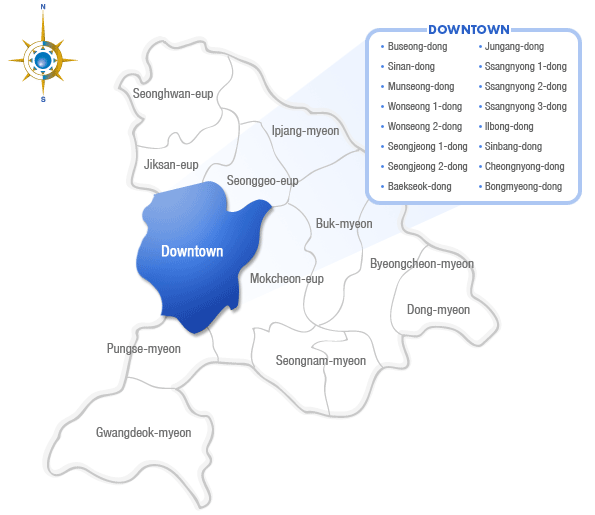
Cheonan Districts

Dongnam District

- Mokcheon-eup (목천읍)
- Pungse-myeon (풍세면)
- Gwangdeok-myeon (광덕면)
- Buk-myeon (북면)
- Seongnam-myeon (성남면)
- Susin-myeon (수신면)
- Byeongcheon-myeon (병천면)
- Dong-myeon (동면)
- Jungang-dong (중앙동) (4 legal dong)
- Munseok-dong (문성동) (2 legal dong)
- Weonseong-1-dong (원성1동) (2 legal dong)
- Weonseong-2-dong (원성2동)
- Bongmyeong-dong (봉명동) (2 legal dong)
- Ilbong-dong (일봉동) (2 legal dong)
- Sinbang-dong (신방동) (2 legal dong)
- Cheonglyong-dong (청룡동) (5 legal dong)
- Sinan-dong (신안동) (2 legal dong)

Seobuk District

- Seonghwan-eup (성환읍)
- Seonggeo-eup (성거읍)
- Jiksan-eup (직산읍)
- Ipjang-myeon (입장면)
- Seongjeong-1-dong (성정1동) (2 legal dong)
- Seongjeong-2-dong (성정2동)
- Ssangyong-1-dong (쌍용1동)
- Ssangyong-2-dong (쌍용2동)
- Ssangyong-3-dong (쌍용3동)
- Baekseok-dong (백석동)
- Buldang-dong (불당동)
- Buseong-1-dong (부성1동) (4 legal dong)
- Buseong-2-dong (부성2동) (3 legal dong)

== Population diversity ==
Even with scores of Korean students graduating from the many tech programs at local universities, the demand for tech sector employees is still very high, and much of that demand is filled by foreign employees. The city is now home to a large foreign population, which has tripled over the past 5 years. There are more than 9,000 foreigners residing in the Cheonan area.

In addition, Cheonan is the site of the prison exclusively intended for foreign prisoners, with more than 1,000 foreign inmates.

== Twin towns – sister cities ==
Cheonan is twinned with:

- Beaverton, Oregon, United States
- Büyükçekmece, Turkey
- Vinh, Vietnam
- Shijiazhuang, China
- Wendeng, Weihai, China
- Wilmington, Delaware, United States

== Notable people from Cheonan ==
- Kim San-ho, South Korean actor
- Elly (Real Name: Ahn Hyo-jin, 안효진), singer, rapper, dancer, songwriter, producer, model and K-pop idol, member of K-pop girlgroup EXID
- Sung Han-bin, K-pop idol, member of K-pop boygroup Zerobaseone
- Kim Tae-rae, K-pop idol, member of K-pop boygroup Zerobaseone
- B.I (Name: Kim Han-bin,김한빈), K-pop artist, singer and rapper, former member of iKon
- Yu Gwan-sun, Korea independence activist against Japanese rule
- Chul Ho Lee, South Korean chef and entrepreneur

== See also ==
- List of cities in South Korea
- Geography of South Korea
- Stele of Bongseon Honggyeongsa, a National Treasure located in Cheonan
