= Nam Kyung-pil =

South Korean politician (born 1965)

The Honourable Nam Kyung-pil
- 남경필
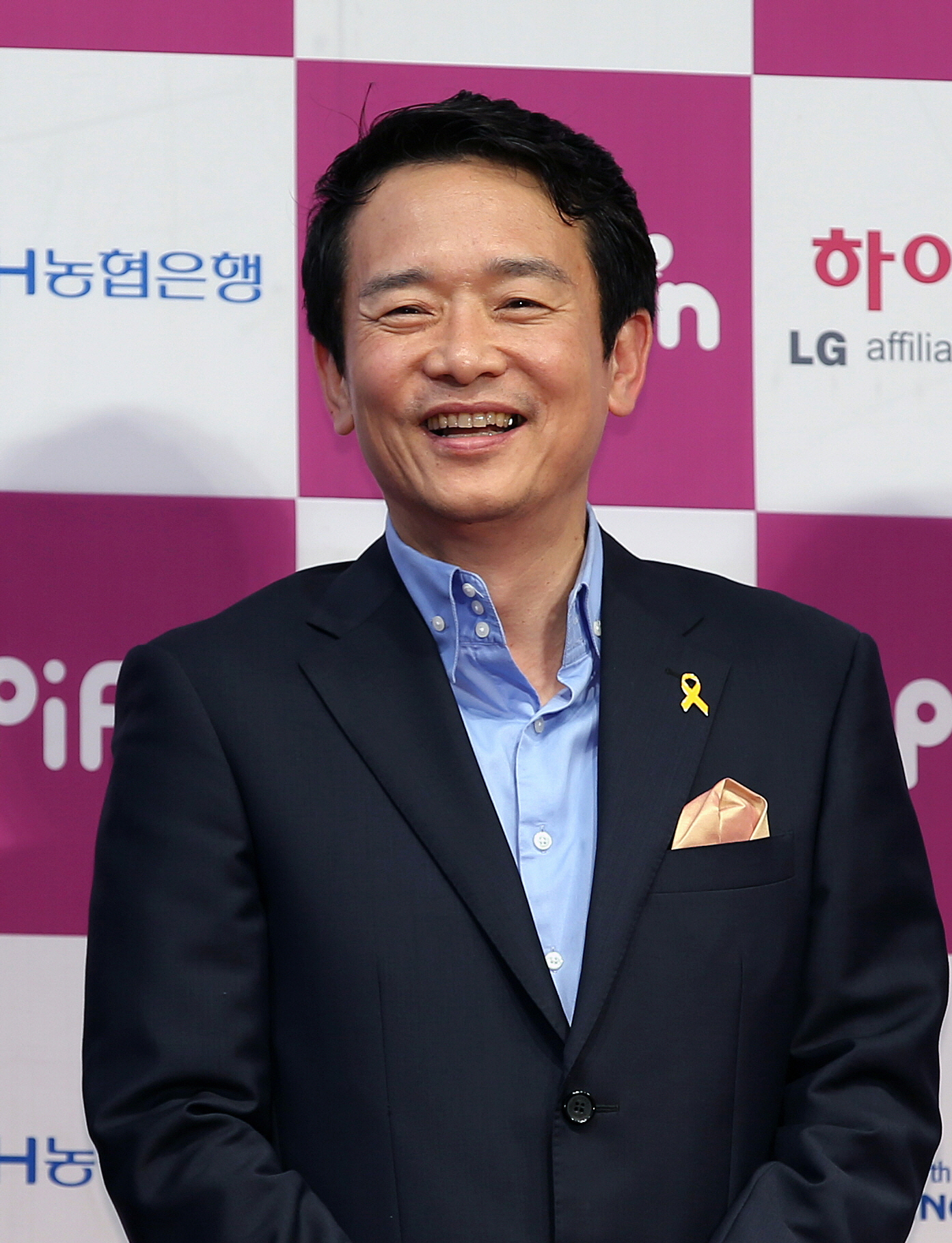
- Nam in 2014

Governor of Gyeonggi Province
- In office 1 July 2014 – 30 June 2018
- Preceded by: Kim Moon-soo
- Succeeded by: Lee Jae Myung

Member of the National Assembly
- In office 21 July 1998 – 15 May 2014
- Preceded by: Nam Pyeong-woo
- Succeeded by: Kim Yong-nam
- Constituency: Suwon Paldal (Gyeonggi, 1998-2012); Suwon C (Gyeonggi, 2012-2014)

Personal details
- Born: 20 January 1965 (age 61) Yongin, South Korea
- Party: People Power
- Other political affiliations: Grand National (1998–2012); Saenuri (2012–2016); Independent (2016–2017, 2018); Bareun (2017–2018); Liberty Korea (2018–2020); United Future (2020)
- Education: Yale School of Management; Yonsei University

Korean name
- Hangul: 남경필
- Hanja: 南景弼
- RR: Nam Gyeongpil
- MR: Nam Kyŏngp'il

Nam Kyung-pil (Korean: 남경필; born 20 January 1965) is a South Korean politician who served as the 34th governor of Gyeonggi Province from 2014 to 2018. Before his election, he had been a member of the National Assembly since 1998, representing Paldal District. In 2016, he left the Saenuri Party because of President Park Geun-hye's scandal. He helped establish the new Bareun Party with other conservative politicians who left Saenuri.

== National Assembly ==
On 21 July 1998, there was a by-election in Paldal District to replace former member, who was also his father, Nam Pyeong-woo, who died on 13 March 1998. Nam won the by-election with 21,356 votes. He had represented Paldal District until 15 May 2014, weeks before the gubernatorial election.

== 2017 presidential election ==
On 25 January 2017, Nam declared that he would run for the president of South Korea in 2017. Nam's major commitment was to change South Korea's military conscription service to volunteer military system. He was defeated in his party's primary by his sole opponent, Yoo Seong-min MP.

== Election results ==
=== General elections ===
Year	Elections	Constituency	Political party	Votes (%)	Results
1998	July 1998 By-election	Suwon Paldal (Gyeonggi)	GNP	19,112 (44.28%)	Won
2000	16th National Assembly General Election	Suwon Paldal (Gyeonggi)	GNP	51,893 (48.93%)	Won
2004	17th National Assembly General Election	Suwon Paldal (Gyeonggi)	GNP	44,287 (49.01%)	Won
2008	18th National Assembly General Election	Suwon Paldal (Gyeonggi)	GNP	41,025 (64.08%)	Won
2012	19th National Assembly General Election	Suwon C (Gyeonggi)	Saenuri	50,011 (50.34%)	Won

=== Local elections ===
==== Governor of Gyeonggi ====
Year	Elections	Constituency	Political party	Votes (%)	Remarks
2014	6th Iocal Election	Gyeonggi (Governoral Elections)	Saenuri	2,524,981 (50.43%)	Won
2018	7th Iocal Election	Gyeonggi (Governoral Elections)	LKP	2,122,433 (35.51%)	Defeated (2nd)

National Assembly of the Republic of Korea
Preceded by Nam Pyeong-woo	Member of the National Assembly for Suwon Paldal (Gyeonggi); 22 July 1998–29 May 2012	Succeeded by Himself (Suwon C, Gyeonggi)
Preceded by Jung Mi-gyeong (Suwon Gwonseon, Gyeonggi); Himself (Suwon Paldal, Gyeonggi)	Member of the National Assembly for Suwon C (Gyeonggi); 30 May 2012–15 May 2014	Succeeded by Kim Yong-nam
Political offices
Preceded by Kim Moon-soo	Governor of Gyeonggi Province; 1 July 2014–30 June 2018	Succeeded by Lee Jae Myung
