= Yonam Institute of Technology =

Private technical college in Jinju, South Gyeongsang province, South Korea

Coordinates: 35.164°N 128.102°E

- Hangul: 연암공과대학교
- Hanja: 蓮庵工科大學校
- RR: Yeonam gonggwa daehakgyo
- MR: Yŏnam kongkwa taehakkyo

Yonam Institute of Technology, also Yonam Engineering College, is a private technical college located in Jinju, South Gyeongsang province, South Korea. It offers courses in computer electronics, hardware design, industrial information design, and related fields.

== Sister colleges ==
Within South Korea, the Yonam Institute maintains sisterhood relationships with Cheonan Yonam College, which was also established by the Yonam Educational Foundation. Internationally, it has relations with seven schools in seven countries: Canberra Institute of Technology in Australia, Changchun Institute of Technology in China, the Fachhochschule Augsburg in Germany, Nippon Bunri University in Japan, Northumbria University in the United Kingdom, St. John's and St. Mary's Institute of Technology in Taiwan, and Laguardia Community College in the United States.

== See also ==
- List of colleges and universities in South Korea
- Education in South Korea
