= Choi Kwang (economist) =

South Korean economist (born 1947)

- 최광

Minister of Health and Welfare
- In office 6 August 1997 – 2 March 1998
- President: Kim Young-sam
- Preceded by: Sohn Hak-kyu
- Succeeded by: Joo Yang-ja

Personal details
- Born: 1 September 1947 (age 79) Namhae County, South Gyeongsang Province, South Korea
- Education: Seoul National University; University of Wisconsin–Madison; University of Maryland
- Occupation: Professor

- Choi Kwang
- Hangul: 최광
- Hanja: 崔洸
- RR: Choe Gwang
- MR: Ch'oe Kwang

Choi Kwang (Korean: 최광; Hanja: 崔洸; born September 1, 1947) is a South Korean economist who specialises in public sector economics. He served as the Minister of Health and Welfare during the presidency of Kim Young-sam.

== Early life ==
Choi was born in Namhae, South Gyeongsang Province. He received his B.A. in Business Administration from Seoul National University before moving to the United States, where he earned an M.A. in Public Policy at the University of Wisconsin–Madison and a Ph.D. in economics at the University of Maryland.

== Career ==
Choi served as an economics professor at the University of Wyoming in the United States and at the Hankuk University of Foreign Studies, as the President of the Korea Institute of Public Finance, and as Chief of National Assembly Budget Office.

In May 2013, Choi was named chairman and chief executive officer of South Korea's National Pension Service (NPS). The NPS has ₩420 trillion (US$400 billion) in assets under management, making it one of the world's top four pension funds in terms of total assets.

Political offices
Preceded by Sohn Hak-kyu	Minister of Health and Welfare; 1997–1998	Succeeded by Joo Yang-ja
