= Sohn Hak-kyu =

South Korean politician (born 1947)

- 손학규
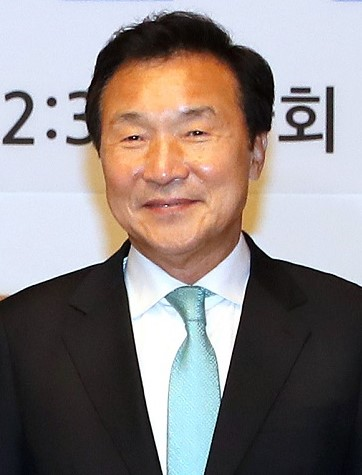
- Sohn in 2019

Leader of the Bareunmirae Party
- In office 2 September 2018 – 24 February 2020
- Preceded by: Yoo Seong-min, Park Joo-sun; Kim Dong-cheol (Interim)
- Succeeded by: Party dissolved

Member of the National Assembly
- In office 28 April 2011 – 29 May 2012
- Preceded by: Yim Tae-hee
- Succeeded by: Jhun Ha-jin
- Constituency: Seongnam Bundang B (Gyeonggi)
- In office 30 May 2000 – 27 May 2002
- Preceded by: Cho Se-hyung
- Succeeded by: Jeon Jae-hee
- Constituency: Gwangmyeong (Gyeonggi)
- In office 24 April 1993 – 6 April 1998
- Preceded by: Yoon Hang-youl
- Succeeded by: Cho Se-hyung
- Constituency: Gwangmyeong (Gyeonggi, 1993–1996); Gwangmyeong B (Gyeonggi, 1996–1998)

Chairman of the Democratic Party
- In office 3 October 2010 – 22 December 2011
- Preceded by: Chung Sye-kyun; Park Jie-won (acting)
- Succeeded by: Position abolished
- In office 17 February 2008 – 6 July 2008 Serving with Park Sang-chun
- Preceded by: Position established
- Succeeded by: Chung Sye-kyun

Governor of Gyeonggi Province
- In office 1 July 2002 – 30 June 2006
- Preceded by: Lim Chang-yeol
- Succeeded by: Kim Moon-soo

Minister of Health and Welfare
- In office 13 November 1996 – 5 August 1997
- President: Kim Young-sam
- Prime Minister: Lee Soo-sung; Goh Kun
- Preceded by: Lee Sung-ho
- Succeeded by: Choi Kwang

Personal details
- Born: 22 November 1947 (age 78) Siheung County, southern Korea
- Party: Independent
- Other political affiliations: Minsaeng Party (2020–2021); Bareunmirae Party (2018–2020); People's Party (2017–2018); Democratic Party of Korea (2007–2016); Grand National Party (1997-2007); Democratic Liberal Party·New Korea Party (1993-1997)
- Education: Seoul National University; University of Oxford
- Website: http://www.hq.or.kr/

Korean name
- Hangul: 손학규
- Hanja: 孫鶴圭
- RR: Son Hakgyu
- MR: Son Hakkyu

Sohn Hak-kyu (Korean: 손학규; born 22 November 1947) is a South Korean politician who served as the Governor of Gyeonggi Province from 2002 to 2006. He was the leader of the liberal Democratic Party. Sohn announced he was running in the 2022 presidential election as an independent candidate, but subsequently withdrew his candidacy.

A Kyunggi High School and Seoul National University graduate, he received his Ph.D. from the University of Oxford.

His daughter, Sohn Won-pyung, is a novelist.

== Election results ==
=== General elections ===
Year	Elections	Constituency	Political party	Votes (%)	Results
1993	April 1993 By-election	Gwangmyeong (Gyeonggi)	DLP	41,683 (44.94%)	Won
1996	15th National Assembly General Election	Gwangmyeong B (Gyeonggi)	NKP	38,795 (42.65%)	Won
2000	16th National Assembly General Election	Gwangmyeong (Gyeonggi)	GNP	65,887 (47.35%)	Won
2008	18th National Assembly General Election	Jongno (Seoul)	UDP	31,530 (44.76%)	Defeated (2nd)
2011	2011 By-election	Seongnam Bundang B (Gyeonggi)	Democratic	41,570 (51.00%)	Won
2014	2014 By-election	Suwon C (Gyeonggi)	NPAD	27,979 (45.04%)	Defeated (2nd)
2020	21st National Assembly General Election	Proportional representation (14th)	Minsaeng	758,778 (2.71%)	Not Elected

=== Local elections ===
==== Governor of Gyeonggi ====
Year	Elections	Constituency	Political party	Votes (%)	Remarks
1998	2nd Iocal Election	Gyeonggi (Governoral Elections)	GNP	1,303,340 (45.69%)	Defeated (2nd)
2002	3rd Iocal Election	Gyeonggi (Governoral Elections)	GNP	1,744,291 (58.37%)	Won

National Assembly of the Republic of Korea
Preceded by Yoon Hang-ryol	Member of the National Assembly from Gwangmyeong (Gyeonggi); 24 April 1993–29 May 1996	Succeeded by Namgoong-jin (Gwangmyeong A, Gyeonggi); Himself (Gwangmyeong B, Gyeonggi)
Preceded by Himself (Gwangmyeong, Gyeonggi)	Member of the National Assembly from Gwangmyeong B (Gyeonggi); 30 May 1996–6 April 1998	Succeeded by Cho Se-hyung
Preceded by Namgoong-jin (Gwangmyeong A, Gyeonggi); Cho Se-hyung (Gwangmyeong B, Gyeonggi)	Member of the National Assembly from Gwangmyeong (Gyeonggi); 30 May 2000–27 May 2002	Succeeded by Jeon Jae-hee
Preceded by Yim Tae-hee	Member of the National Assembly from Seongnam Bundang B (Gyeonggi); 28 April 2011–29 May 2012	Succeeded by Jhun Ha-jin
Political offices
Preceded by Lee Sung-ho	Minister of Health and Welfare; 13 November 1996–5 August 1997	Succeeded by Choi Kwang
Preceded by Lim Chang-yeol	Governor of Gyeonggi; 1 July 2002–30 June 2006	Succeeded by Kim Moon-soo
Party political offices
Preceded by Oh Chung-il	Chairman of the Grand Unified Democratic New Party; 11 January 2008–17 February 2008	Succeeded by Office abolished
Preceded by New Office	Co-Chairman United Democratic Party (with Park Sang-chun); 17 February 2008–6 July 2008	Succeeded by Chung Sye-kyun
Preceded by Chung Sye-kyun; Park Jie-won (Interim)	Chairman of the Democratic Party; 3 October 2010–22 December 2011	Succeeded by Office abolished
Preceded by Yoo Seong-min, Park Joo-sun (Co-Leader); Kim Dong-cheol (Interim)	Leader of the Bareunmirae Party; 2 September 2018–24 February 2020	Succeeded by Office abolished
