= Kim Young-hoon (politician) =

South Korean politician (born 1968)

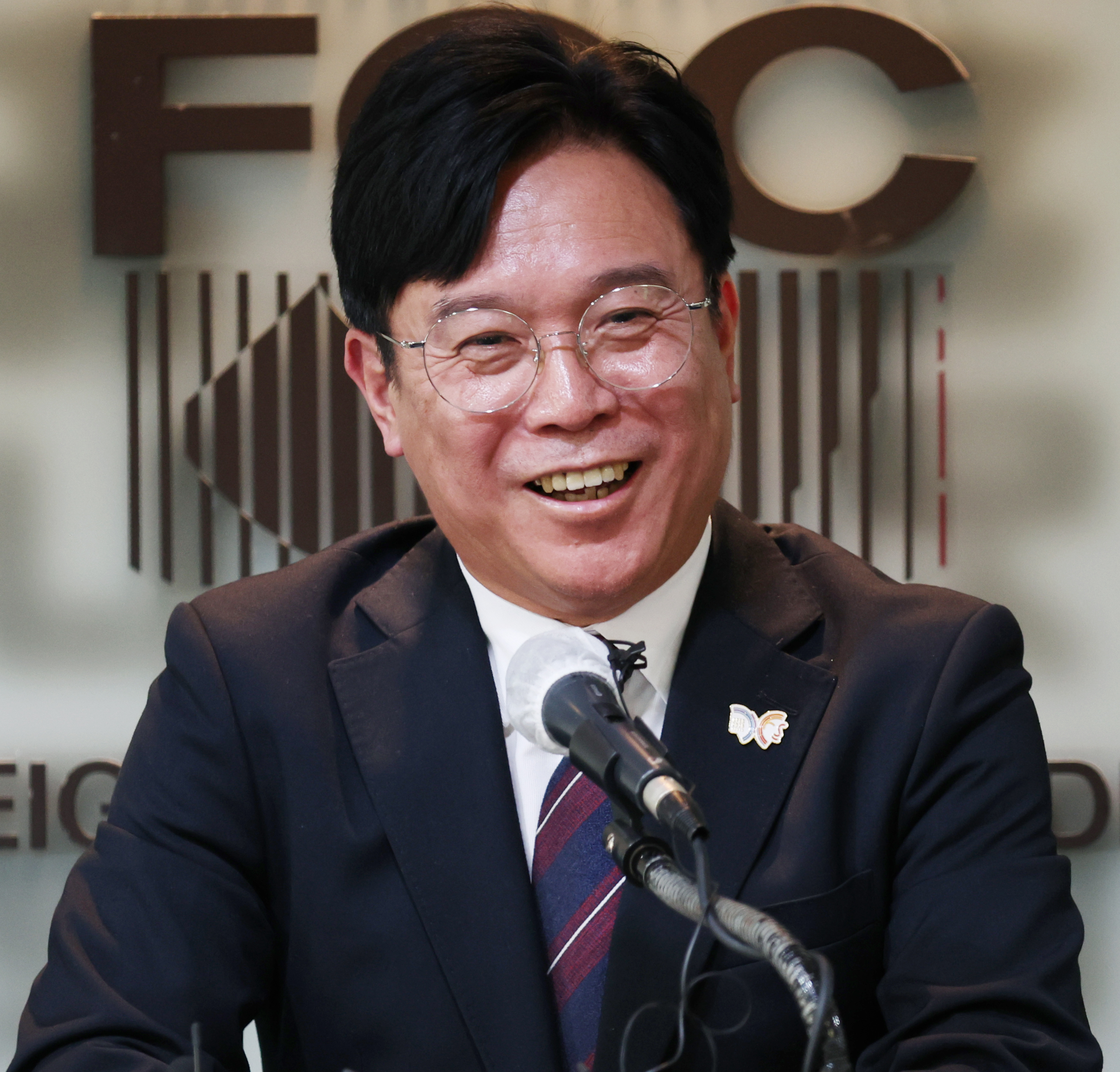
- Kim Young-hoon in 2025

Minister of Employment and Labor
- Incumbent
- Assumed office 21 July 2025
- President: Lee Jae Myung
- Prime Minister: Kim Min-seok; Han Seong-sook
- Preceded by: Kim Moon-soo; Kim Min-seok (acting); Kwon Chang-joon (acting)

Personal details
- Born: 1968 (age 57–58) Busan, South Korea
- Party: Democratic Party
- Other political affiliations: Justice Party; Democratic Alliance of Korea (formerly)
- Education: Dong-A University (BS); Sungkonghoe University (MA)

Korean name
- Hangul: 김영훈
- RR: Gim Yeonghun
- MR: Kim Yŏnghun

Kim Young-hoon (Korean: 김영훈; born 1968) is a South Korean labor activist and politician who has served as the country's minister of employment and labor since July 2025.

== Early life and education ==
Kim was born in 1968 in Busan, South Korea. He graduated from Masan Central High School and studied Bachelor of Science (B.S.) in Animal Science at Dong-A University. He later took Master of Arts (M.A.) in Political Science at the Graduate School of NGO Studies at Sungkonghoe University.

== Career ==
He began his career as a railroad engineer in 1992 at the Korea Railroad Corporation (KORAIL). There, he came to serve as the head of the Busan branch of the railroad union in 2000 and as national Chairperson in 2004. He held the position of Chairperson of the Korean Confederation of Trade Unions (KCTU) from 2010 to 2012.

Kim entered politics by joining the Justice Party in 2017. He assisted President Lee Jae Myung in presidential elections. In April 2024, he received the 20th proportional representation seat from the Democratic Party's satellite party, the Democratic Alliance.

In 2025, the presidential office designated the candidate, saying, "We expect him to play a role in strengthening the rights of workers through reducing industrial accidents, amending the yellow envelope law, and implementing a 4.5-day workweek."
