= Governor of Gyeonggi Province =

South Korean provincial official

- 경기도지사
- Seal of Gyeonggi

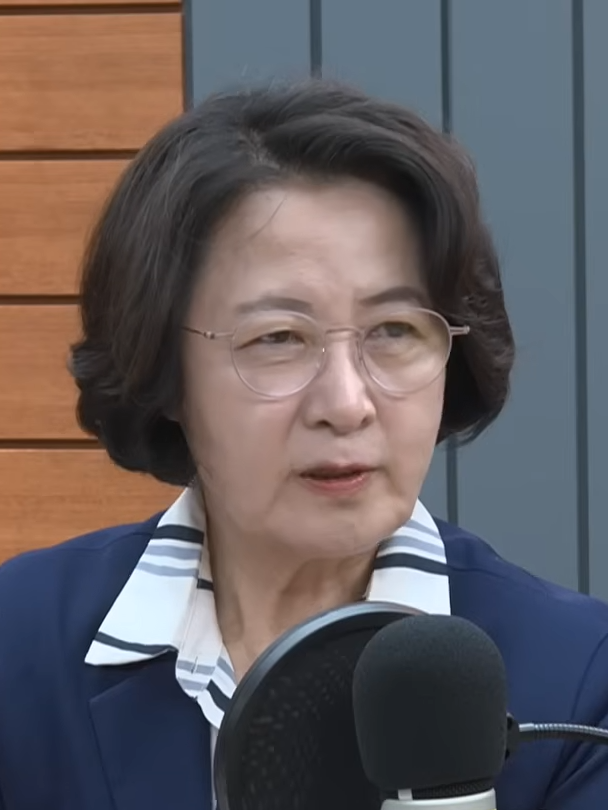
- Incumbent; Choo Mi-ae since 1 July 2026
- Term length: Four years
- Inaugural holder: Koo Ja-ok
- Formation: 15 February 1946; 80 years ago
- Deputy: 3 Vice Governors
- Website: governor.gg.go.kr

The Governor of Gyeonggi Province (Korean: 경기도지사; Hanja: 京畿道知事) is the head of the local government of Gyeonggi Province, South Korea, who is elected to a four-year term.

== List of governors ==
=== Appointed governors (before 1995) ===
From 1946 to 1995, the Governor of Gyeonggi Province was appointed by the President of the Republic of Korea.

=== Directly elected governors (1995–present) ===
Since 1995, under provisions of the revised Local Government Act, the Governor of Gyeonggi Province is elected by direct election.

Political parties
Conservative
Liberal
Independent
Status
Denotes acting governor

Term	Portrait	Name (Birth–Death)	Term of office			Political party	Elected
Term	Portrait	Name (Birth–Death)	Took office	Left office	Time in office	Political party	Elected
1st		Lee In-je 이인제 李仁濟 (born 1948)	1 July 1995	18 September 1997	2 years, 80 days	Democratic Liberal → New Korea	1995
1st		Lim Su-bok 임수복 林秀福 (born 1943); Acting	19 September 1997	30 June 1998	285 days	Independent	—
2nd		Lim Chang-yeol 임창열 林昌烈 (born 1944)	1 July 1998	30 June 2002	4 years, 0 days	National Congress	1998
3rd		Sohn Hak-kyu 손학규 孫鶴圭 (born 1948)	1 July 2002	30 June 2006	4 years, 0 days	Grand National	2002
4th		Kim Moon-soo 김문수 金文洙 (born 1951)	1 July 2006	30 June 2014	8 years, 0 days	Grand National → Saenuri	2006
5th		Kim Moon-soo 김문수 金文洙 (born 1951)	1 July 2006	30 June 2014	8 years, 0 days	Grand National → Saenuri	2010
6th		Nam Kyung-pil 남경필 南景弼 (born 1965)	1 July 2014	30 June 2018	4 years, 0 days	Saenuri → Bareun → Liberty Korea	2014
7th		Lee Jae Myung 이재명 李在明 (born 1963)	1 July 2018	25 October 2021	3 years, 117 days	Democratic	2018
7th		Oh Byeong-kwon 오병권 吳秉權 (born 1971); Acting	26 October 2021	30 June 2022	248 days	Independent	—
8th		Kim Dong-yeon 김동연 金東兗 (born 1957)	1 July 2022	1 July 2026	4 years, 0 days	Democratic	2022
9th		Choo Mi-ae 추미애 秋美愛 (born 1958)	1 July 2026	incumbent	69 days	Democratic	2026

== Elections ==
=== 1995 ===
1995 Gyeonggi gubernatorial election
Party	#	Candidate	Votes	Percentage
Democratic Liberal	1	Lee In-je	1,264,914	40.56%
Democratic	2	Chang Kyoung-woo	923,069	29.60%
Independent	4	Im Sa-bin	613,624	19.67%
United Liberal Democrats	3	Kim Moon-won	316,637	10.15%
Total			3,118,244	100.00%
Voter turnout			63.23%	

=== 1998 ===
1998 Gyeonggi gubernatorial election
Party	#	Candidate	Votes	Percentage
National Congress	2	Lim Chang-yeol	1,549,189	54.30%
Grand National	1	Sohn Hak-kyu	1,303,340	45.69%
Total			2,852,529	100.00%
Voter turnout			50.00%	

=== 2002 ===
2002 Gyeonggi gubernatorial election
Party	#	Candidate	Votes	Percentage
Grand National	1	Sohn Hak-kyu	1,744,291	58.37%
Millennium Democratic	2	Jin Nyum	1,075,243	35.98%
Democratic Labor	3	Kim Joon-ki	168,357	5.63%
Total			2,987,891	100.00%
Voter turnout			44.63%	

=== 2006 ===
2006 Gyeonggi gubernatorial election
Party	#	Candidate	Votes	Percentage
Grand National	2	Kim Moon-soo	2,181,677	59.68%
Uri	1	Jin Dae-je	1,124,317	30.75%
Democratic Labor	4	Kim Yong-han	201,106	5.50%
Democratic	3	Park Jung-il	148,409	4.05%
Total			3,655,509	100.00%
Voter turnout			46.67%	

=== 2010 ===
2010 Gyeonggi gubernatorial election
Party	#	Candidate	Votes	Percentage
Grand National	1	Kim Moon-soo	2,271,492	52.20%
Participation	8	Rhyu Si-min	2,079,892	47.79%
Total			4,351,384	100.00%
Voter turnout			51.76%	

=== 2014 ===
2014 Gyeonggi gubernatorial election
Party	#	Candidate	Votes	Percentage
Saenuri	1	Nam Kyung-pil	2,524,981	50.43%
NPAD	2	Kim Jin-pyo	2,481,824	49.56%
Total			5,006,805	100.00%
Voter turnout			53.28%	

=== 2018 ===
2018 Gyeonggi gubernatorial election
Party	#	Candidate	Votes	Percentage
Democratic	1	Lee Jae Myung	3,370,621	56.40%
Liberty Korea	2	Nam Kyung-pil	2,122,433	35.51%
Bareunmirae	3	Kim Young-hwan	287,504	4.81%
Justice	5	Lee Hong-woo	151,871	2.54%
Minjung	6	Kim Young-hwan	43,098	0.72%
Total			5,975,527	100.00%
Voter turnout			57.77%	

=== 2022 ===
2022 Gyeonggi gubernatorial election
Party	#	Candidate	Votes	Percentage
Democratic	1	Kim Dong-yeon	2,827,593	49.06%
People Power	2	Kim Eun-hye	2,818,680	48.91%
Independent	6	Kang Yongseok	54,758	0.95%
Justice	3	Hwang Sun-sik	38,525	0.66%
Progressive	5	Song Young-ju	13,939	0.24%
Basic Income	4	Seo Tae-seong	9,314	0.16%
Total			5,762,809	100.00%
Voter turnout			50.63%	

=== 2026 ===
Candidate	Party	Votes	%
Choo Mi-ae	Democratic Party	3,760,080	55.04
Yang Hyang-ja	People Power Party	2,689,879	39.38
Cho Eung-chun	Reform Party	295,232	4.32
Hong Seong-kyu	Progressive Party	46,677	0.68
Kim Hyeon-uk	People Union	39,360	0.58
Total		6,831,228	100.00
Valid votes		6,831,228	98.55
Invalid/blank votes		100,800	1.45
Total votes		6,932,028	100.00
Registered voters/turnout		11,878,997	58.36
Democratic hold			

== See also ==
- Government of South Korea
- Politics of South Korea
