= Ministry of Employment and Labor =

Government ministry of South Korea

- 고용노동부

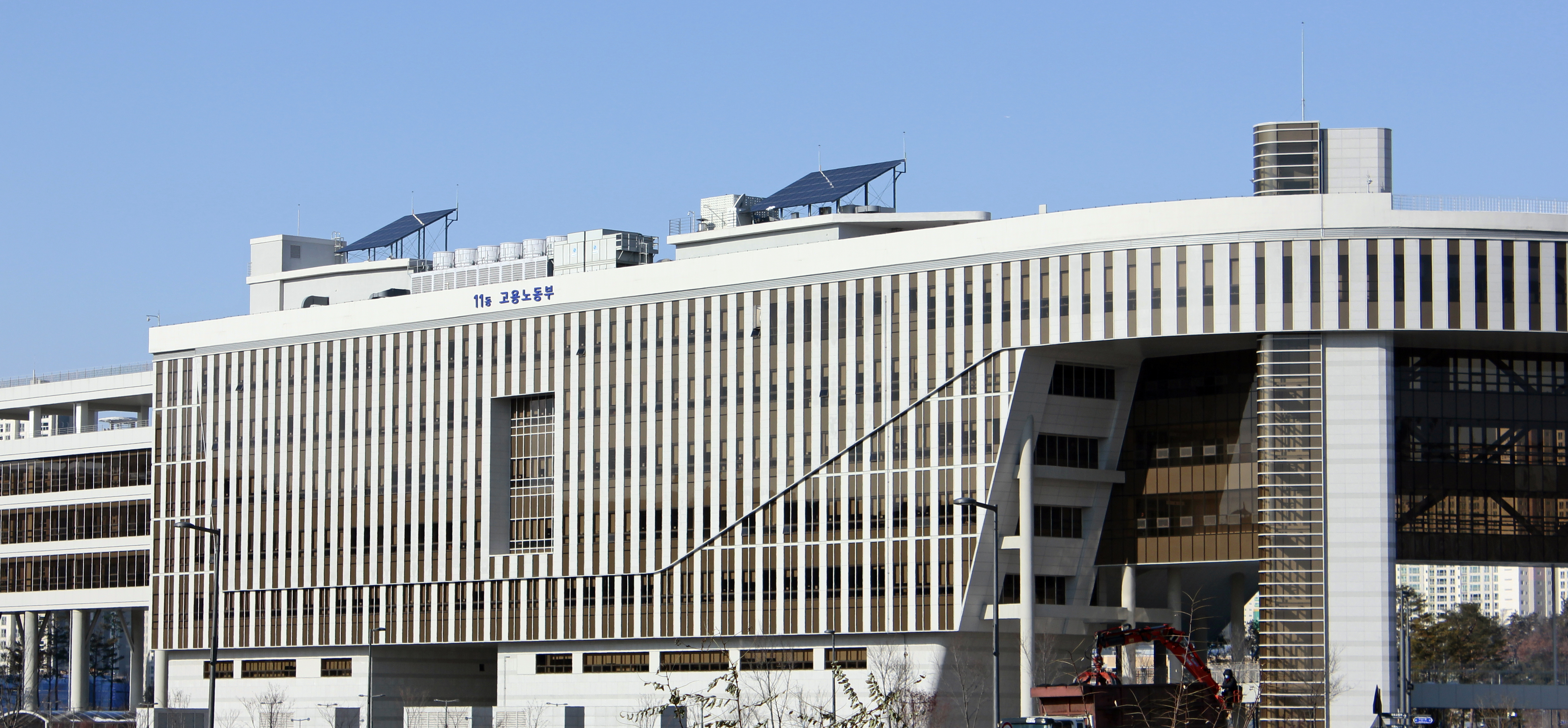
- MOEL headquarters in Sejong

Agency overview
- Formed: July 5, 2010
- Preceding agencies: Division of Labor, Ministry of Social Affairs (1948-1963); Labor Administration (1963-1981); Ministry of Labor (1981-2010)
- Jurisdiction: Government of South Korea
- Headquarters: 422, Hanuridae-ro, Sejong, South Korea
- Minister responsible: Kim Young-hoon
- Deputy Minister responsible: Kwon Chang-joon
- Website: www.moel.go.kr/english

Korean name
- Hangul: 고용노동부
- Hanja: 雇傭勞動部
- RR: Goyong nodongbu
- MR: Koyong nodongbu

Ministry of Employment and Labor (MOEL; Korean: 고용노동부) is a cabinet-level ministry of the government of South Korea that oversees labor-related affairs. Its predecessor agency, the Division of Labor, was established under the direction of the Minister of Social Affairs (사회부장관) on 11 November 1948. It was upgraded to a cabinet ministry on 8 April 1981.

The headquarters are located in Building #11 of the Sejong Government Complex in Sejong City. Previously the headquarters were located in Buildings 1 and 3 of the Government Complex II in Gwacheon, Gyeonggi Province.

== Mission ==
1. Establish a solid foundation for protecting vulnerable groups and revitalizing the labor market
2. Build the groundwork for creating quality jobs by strengthening the private sector's capacity to generate employment and by reinforcing employment services and safety net.
3. Provide tailored job support based on gender and age.
4. Enhance vocational skills development to equip workers for the demands of the future labor market.
5. Achieve a significant reduction in serious industrial accidents by implementing site-focused occupational safety and health administration.

== Logo ==
1948~1999

1999~2009

2009~2010

2010~2016

2016~present

== Ministers ==
	Image	Name	Name (Korean)	Took office	Left office	Cabinet
6			김영주	2017년 8월 14일	2018년 9월 21일	Cabinet of Moon Jae-in
7			이재갑	2018년 9월 21일	2021년 5월 6일	Cabinet of Moon Jae-in
8			안경덕	2021년 5월 7일	2022년 5월 9일	Cabinet of Moon Jae-in
9			이정식	2022년 5월 10일	2024년 8월 29일	Cabinet of Yoon Suk Yeol
10			김문수	2024년 8월 30일	2025년 4월 8일	Cabinet of Yoon Suk Yeol
11		Kim Young Hoon	김영훈	10 May 2022	29 December 2023	Cabinet of Lee Jae Myung

== Work ==
Major tasks include the establishment of policies related to employment, the establishment and management of policies related to industrial insurance, the establishment of policies related to occupational capacity development, employment equality with work and family compatibility, and the establishment of policies related to labor conditions.

== See also ==
- Unemployment in South Korea
- Trade unions in South Korea
- Korea University of Technology and Education
- Korea Polytechnics
