= List of political parties in South Korea =

This article lists political parties in South Korea.

South Korea has a weakly institutionalized multi-party system, characterized by frequent changes in party arrangements. It has sometimes been described as having characteristics of a two-party system. At least one of the many political parties has a chance of gaining power alone.

== Current parties ==
=== Parties represented in the National Assembly ===
Party	Abbr.	Leader	Ideology	Political position	North Korea policy	National Assembly	Governors
Democratic Party; 더불어민주당	DPK	Kim Min-seok	Liberalism	Centre to centre-left	Pro–Sunshine Policy	161 / 300	12 / 16
People Power Party; 국민의힘	PPP	Jang Dong-hyeok	Conservatism; Right-wing populism	Right-wing to far-right (Note: Attributed to multiple sources:)	Against dialogue	109 / 300	4 / 16
Rebuilding Korea Party; 조국혁신당	RKP	Shin Jang-sik	Progressivism; Liberalism	Centre-left	Pro–Sunshine Policy	12 / 300	0 / 17
Progressive Party; 진보당	PP	Kim Jong-hoon	Progressivism; Left-wing populism	Left-wing to far-left	Pro–Sunshine Policy	4 / 300	0 / 17
Reform Party; 개혁신당	RP	Chun Ha-ram (acting)	Conservatism; Libertarian conservatism	Centre-right to right-wing	Against dialogue	3 / 300	0 / 17
Basic Income Party; 기본소득당	BIP	Oh Jun-ho	Universal basic income	Single-issue	None	1 / 300	0 / 17
Social Democratic Party; 사회민주당	SDP	Han Chang-min	Social democracy	Centre-left	None	1 / 300	0 / 17

=== Extra-parliamentary parties ===
==== Conservative parties ====
- Republican Party of South Korea (공화당)
- Our Republican Party (우리공화당)
- Korean National Party (2015) (한국국민당)
- Saenuri Party (2017) (새누리당)
- Hannara Party (2014) (한나라당)
- All Citizen's Participatory Party (가가국민참여신당)
- Korea Party (가나반공정당코리아)
- The Christian Party (기독당)
- Korean Independence Party (한국독립당)
- Every House Public Election Grand Party (가가호호공명선거대한당)
- Liberal Democratic Party (South Korea) (자유민주당)
- People Union (국민연합)
- Korean People's Party (대한국민당)
- People's Grand United Party (국민대통합당)
- National Solidarity for National Unity (국민통합연대)
- Future Korean Peninsula Party (한반도미래당)
- Liberal Unification Party (자유통일당) (Note: Has an elected local district councilor in Seoul.)
- Freedom & Innovation Party (자유와혁신)

==== Centrist (or conservative liberal) parties ====
- Hongik Party (홍익당)
- Elders' Welfare Party (노인복지당)
- Party for Democracy and Peace (민주평화당)
- People's Policy Party (국민정책당)
- Popular Democratic Party (대중민주당)
- Centre Innovation Party (중도혁신당)

==== Liberal parties ====
- Republic of Korea Party (대한민국당)
- Open Democratic Party (열린민주당), a recreation of the now-dissolved Open Democratic Party, which merged with the Democratic Party.
- Korea's Farmer and Fisherman's Party (한국농어민당)
- New Future Democratic Party (새로운미래)

==== Progressive parties ====
- Labor Party (노동당)
- Justice Party (정의당) (Note: Has elected local city councilors around the country.)
- Green Party (녹색당) (Note: has an elected city councilor in Andong City.)
- Our Future (미래당)
- National Sovereignty Party (국민주권당)

==== Single-issue parties ====
- Women's Party (여성의당)
- People's Democracy Party (민중민주당)
- Garak (party) (가락당), aimed at eliminating the special privilege of sitting lawmakers not being able to be tried for crimes while serving as lawmaker.
- Korea Business Party (대한상공인당)
- Korean Wave Union Party (한류연합당)

==== Unknown stances, third position, or syncretic parties ====
- National Revolutionary Party (국가혁명당)
- Unification Korea Party (통일한국당), Samgyun-ist party, where republican and nationalist political thought merge.
- Towards Tomorrow, Towards the Future (내일로미래로), an electoral alliance party of 10 minor conservative parties. Formerly known as the Chungcheong's Future Party. (2020–2023)
- Taegeun (태건당), a pseudo-religious party created on the basis of the religious cult of the Dragon Empire.

=== Parties in formation ===
These parties are not legal acting political parties yet, but are in the process of gathering petition signatures to become formal political parties.

Party name	Registration date	Party leader	Petitioning deadline	Notes
Small Business Party 소상공인당	18 March 2024	Kim Jae-heum	18 September 2024	A single-issue moderate reformist party for protecting small business owners and the middle class.
Nuclear Nation Party 핵나라당	14 May 2024	Jeong Hui-won	14 November 2024	A Hitlerite party that has submitted its attempted registration for the 8th time
Every House Public Election's Party 가가호호공명선거당	27 May 2024	Min Hyeong-wook	17 November 2024	Single-issue party meant to reform the election management system.

== Defunct parties ==
Timeline of all mainstream political parties from 1945 to 2014

=== Conservative parties ===
==== Mainstream parties ====
- National Association (1946–1960)
- Liberal Party (1951–1970)
- Democratic Republican Party (1963–1980)
- Democratic Justice Party (1981–1990)
- Democratic Liberal Party → New Korea Party (1990–1997)
- Grand National Party → Saenuri Party → Liberty Korea Party (1997–2020)
- People Future Party (국민의미래), a satellite party of the ruling People Power. (2024)

==== Minor parties ====
- Korea Independence Party (1928–1970)
- Korean Women's National Party (1945–1961)
- Federation Korean National Independence (1947–1951)
- Korea National Party (1947–1958)
- Reconstruction Party (1963)
- Yusinjeonguhoe (1973–1980)
- Korean National Party (1981–1988)
- New Democratic Republican Party (1987–1990)
- United People's Party → Democratic Party (1992–1995)
- New Political Reform Party (1992–1994)
- New Korea Party (1992–1995)
- New Democratic Party (1994–1995)
- Non-partisan National Federation (1995–1997)
- New National Party (1997–1998)
- United Liberal Democrats (1995–2006)
- New Korea Party of Hope (2000–2001)
- Hanaro National Union (2002–2004)
- National Integration 21 (2002–2004)
- Korean Coalition for the Future (2002)
- People First Party (2005–2008)
- Liberty Forward Party → Advancement Unification Party (2008–2012)
- Let's Go! People-Centered Party (2011–2012)
- Great Korea Party (2012)
- Evergreen Korea Party (2017–2018)
- Grand National United Party (2017–2018)
- Bareun Party (2017–2018)
- Bareunmirae Party (2018–2020)
- New Conservative Party (2020)
- Republican Party (공화당) (2014–2020), merged with Christian Liberal Unification Party (기독자유통일당) to form National Revolutionary Party (국민혁명당).
- Cosmic Logic (2020)
- Free Korea 21 (2016–2021), formerly Korea Economic Party.
- Ahn Cheol-soo's People's Party (2020–2022), merged with the People Power.
- Pro-Park Coalition (친박연대) (2012–2022)
- Future Korean Peninsula Union (한반도미래연합) (2016–2022)
- Liberal Party (자유당) (2020–2024)
- Revolution 21 (혁명21당) (2021–2024)
- Dawn of Liberty (자유의새벽당) (2019–2024)
- Pro-Park New Party (친박신당) (2020–2024), merged with the People Power Party.

=== Liberal parties ===
==== Mainstream parties ====
- Korea Democratic Party (1945–1949)
- Democratic Nationalist Party (1949–1955)
- Democratic Party (1955–1961)
- Civil Rule Party (1963–1965)
- Democratic Party (1963–1965)
- People's Party → New Democratic Party (1965–1980, banned)
- Democratic Korea Party (1981–1988)
- New Korea and Democratic Party (1984–1988)
- Reunification Democratic Party (1987–1990)
- Peace Democratic Party (1987–1991)
- Democratic Party (1991–1995)
- National Congress for New Politics (1995–2000)
- Millennium Democratic Party → Democratic Party (2000–2008)
- Uri Party (2002–2007)
- Grand Unified Democratic New Party (2007–2008)
- United Democratic Party → Democratic Party (2008–2011)
- Democratic United Party → Democratic Party (2011–2014)
- Platform Party (2020), a satellite party of the Democratic Party, Basic Income Party and Transition Korea.
- Democratic Alliance of Korea (국민의미래), a satellite party of the Democratic Party, Progressive Party and Basic Income Party. (2024)

==== Minor parties ====
- Democratic Party (1963–1965)
- Democratic Unification Party (1973–1980)
- Democratic Party (1990–1991)
- Democratic Party (1995–1997)
- The Participation Party (2010–2011)
- Citizens Unity Party (2011)
- New Political Vision Party (2014)
- Democratic Party (2014–2016)
- People's Party (2016–2018)
- Party for Democracy and Peace (2018–2020)
- New Alternatives (2019–2020)
- Alliance for Political Reform (2020) attempted satellite party, including Democratic Party, Minjung Party, Justice Party, Green Party Korea, Mirae Party and he Minsaeng Party but broke down before election.
- Future Democratic Party (2020)
- Open Democratic Party (2020–2022)
- Kim Dong-yeon's New Wave (새로운물결 - 오징어당) (2021–2022)
- Transition Korea (2020–2023), merged into conservative People Power.
- Hope of Korea (2023–2024), merged into Lee Jun-seok's New Reform Party.
- Awakened Citizens Solidarity Party (깨어있는시민연대당) (Note: Disbanded 24 March 2024 after not registering candidates for the 2024 Parliament election)
- K-Political Innovation Union Party (K정치혁신연합당) (2022–2024) (Note: Self-dissolved after coming second-to-last in the 2024 South Korean legislative election)
- New Choice (새로운선택) (2023-2024), merged into Lee Jun-seok's New Reform Party.
- Pine Tree Party (소나무당), (2024-2026) merged into Democratic Party.

=== Progressive parties ===
- Preparatory Committee for National Construction → People's Party of Korea → People's Labor Party (1945–1950)
- Workers' Party of South Korea (1946–1949)
- Korean Social Democratic Party (조선사회민주당, banned)
- Socialist Party (1951–1953)
- Progressive Party (1956–1958, banned)
- New Reform Party (1995)
- United Socialist Party of Korea (1961–1967, banned)
- Revolutionary Party for Reunification → National Democratic Front of South Korea → Anti-Imperialist National Democratic Front (1969–2005, banned)
- Hankyoreh Democratic Party (1988–1991)
- People's Party (1988)
- Popular Party (1990–1992)
- Progressive Political Alliance (1997)
- Construction National Victory 21 (1997–1999)
- Democratic Labor Party (2000–2011)
- People's Party for Reform (2002–2004)
- Social Democratic Party of Korea (2002–2004)
- Youth Progressive Party → Socialist Party → Korea Socialist Party → Socialist Party (1998–2012)
- New Progressive Party (2008–2012)
- Solidarity for New Progressive Integration (2011)
- Unified Progressive Party (2011–2014, banned)
- Youth Party (2012)
- People's United Party (2016–2017)
- New People's Party (2017)
- Socialist Revolutionary Workers' Party, (Note: an unregistered left-wing to far-left political party. It is unable to register due to a ban on openly socialist or communist parties under the National Security Act.) merged with Labor Party. (2016–2022)
- Let's Go! Peace and Human Rights Party (가자!평화인권당) (2020–2024) (Note: Dissolved by the National Elections Commission in 2024 for not participating in an election for 4 years)

=== Green parties ===
- Green Peace Party (2002–2004)
- Green Social Democratic Party (2004)
- Korea Greens (2004–2008)
- Let's go! Green Party (가자환경당; 2020–2024) (Note: Dissolved by the National Elections Commission in 2024 for not participating in an election for 4 years)

=== Unknown or syncretic parties ===
- New Han People's Peninsula Peace Party (신한반도체제평화당), pan-Korean nationalism and Cheondoism, claims to support the unification of not only the Korean Peninsula, but of lands where Koreans are located in China, Russia, and Japan as well. Merged with Chungcheong's Future Party to create Towards Tomorrow, Towards the Future. (2021–2023)
- Functional Self-Employment Party (직능자영업당), (single-issue) merged into Towards Tomorrow, Towards the Future. (2020–2024)
- Small and Medium-sized Businesses and Self-employed Peoples' Party (중소자영업당) (2020–2024) (Note: Dissolved by the National Elections Commission in 2024 for not participating in an election for 4 years)

== Religious parties ==
- Universal Peace and Unification Family Party (천주평화통일가정당)
- Family Party for Peace and Unity (평화통일가정당)

== Banned political movements ==
- General Association of Korean Residents in Japan "Chongryon" (총련)
- South Korean National Liberation Front Preparation Committee (남조선민족해방전선준비위원회)

== See also ==
- List of ruling political parties by country
- Politics of South Korea
- Conservatism in South Korea
- Liberalism in South Korea
- Progressivism in South Korea
