= Alliance for Political Reform =

2020 political party in South Korea

- Leader: Ryu Jong-yeol; Jo Seong-woo; Shin Pil-gyun
- Founded: March 15, 2020
- Dissolved: April 7, 2020
- Headquarters: 4th Floor, 169 Dasan-ro, Jung-gu, Seoul
- Ideology: Progressivism
- Colours: Yellow; Green; Blue; Miraedang Blue

Korean name
- Hangul: 정치개혁연합
- Hanja: 政治改革聯合
- RR: Jeongchi gaehyeok yeonhap
- MR: Chŏngch'i kaehyŏk yŏnhap

The Alliance for Political Reform (Korean: 정치개혁연합) was a South Korean political party formed through a coalition of various parties for proportional representation in preparation for the 2020 South Korean legislative election.

This party was originally founded through a coalition of the Democratic Party of Korea, Minsaeng Party, Justice Party, Minjung Party, Green Party, and Our Future Party to contest proportional representation seats under the newly adopted mixed-member proportional (MMP) system ahead of the general election; however, the project collapsed after the Democratic Party of Korea decided to join the Platform Party instead.
