= Youth Party (South Korea) =

2012 political party in South Korea

- Leader: Kang Joo-hee; Kwon Wan-soo
- Founded: March 19, 2012
- Dissolved: April 12, 2012
- Succeeded by: Mirae Party; New Political Vision Party
- Headquarters: 392-6, Hapjeong-dong, Mapo-gu, Seoul, South Korea
- Ideology: Ecology; Grassroots democracy
- Political position: Centre-left
- Colours: Orange
- National Assembly: 0 / 300

Korean name
- Hangul: 청년당
- RR: Cheongnyeondang
- MR: Ch'ŏngnyŏndang

The Youth Party (Korean: 청년당) was a political party in South Korea that existed from 19 March 2012 to 12 April 2012.

== History ==
The party was founded on 19 March 2012, centred around young people who participated in Ahn Cheol-soo's Youth Concert. At the time of its founding, as Ahn Cheol-soo was known as a progressive politician, the Youth Party also put forward youth self-reliance, national happiness and political reform as its guiding principles. In the 2012 South Korean legislative election held on 11 April 2012, three constituency candidates and four proportional representation candidates ran, but all candidates were defeated in the constituency vote, and the party failed to enter the National Assembly after recording a vote share of 0.34% in the proportional representation vote. On 12 April 2012, its registration was revoked by the National Election Commission due to failing to meet the party vote share requirement.

Following the dissolution of the Youth Party, figures including Oh Tae-yang, Woo In-cheol, Kang Joo-hee and Kim So-hee, who held a critical view of Ahn Cheol-soo or have previously held progressive youth political and New Left tendencies joined the Mirae Party (formerly known as Our Future), which was founded in 2017. On the other hand figures associated with Ahn, including Kang Yeon-jae, joined the New Political Vision Party founded in 2012 and later the People Party founded in 2016.

== See also ==
- People Party (South Korea, 2016)
- New Political Vision Party (South Korea)
- Mirae Party
