= Green Peace Party =

2002–2004 political party in South Korea

- Leader: Park Chang-hwa; Im Sam-jin; Jeong Hae-hoon
- Founded: May 20, 2002
- Dissolved: February 22, 2004
- Merged into: Green Social Democratic Party
- Ideology: Progressivism center left
- Political position: Centre-left
- Colours: Green

Korean name
- Hangul: 녹색평화당
- Hanja: 綠色平和黨
- RR: Noksaek pyeonghwadang
- MR: Noksaek p'yŏnghwadang

The Green Peace Party (Korean: 녹색평화당) was a South Korean political party, advocating for progressivism and green politics, that was founded on 20 May 2002, centring on the environmental organisations Green Korea United and the Korean Federation for Environmental Movements. Figures such as Im Sam-jin, Choi Byeong-ok and Park Chang-hwa participated in the party's founding process and served as co-representatives.

The Green Peace Party put forward "environmentalism, respect for life, grassroots democracy, decentralisation, the realisation of social justice, gender equality, a commitment to peace and non-violence, transparency, respect for diversity, global justice, and the realisation of a sustainable society" as its core policies. In the 2002 South Korean local elections held on 13 June 2002, candidates ran for the offices of city/provincial governor, head of a district and member of a city council as well as for proportional representation seats in metropolitan/provincial councils, but none of them secured a seat.

At the time of its founding, the party was led by co-representatives Park Chang-hwa, Im Sam-jin and Jeong Hae-hoon. On 27 September 2002, co-representative Im Sam-jin left the party, along with Lee Jang-hu and Park Cheol-min citing the impossibility of realising green politics through the party.

On 5 February 2004, Park Chang-hwa and Jeong Hae-hun announced a merger with the Social Democratic Party of Korea to form the Green Social Democratic Party to "eradicate corrupt politics, overcome the economic crisis, preserve the green environment, and establish social welfare." The Green Social Democratic Party founded through a merger convention held at the Weightlifting Gymnasium in Seoul Olympic Park on 22 February 2004.
