= Choi Young-hee =

South Korean politician (1921–2006)

- 최영희
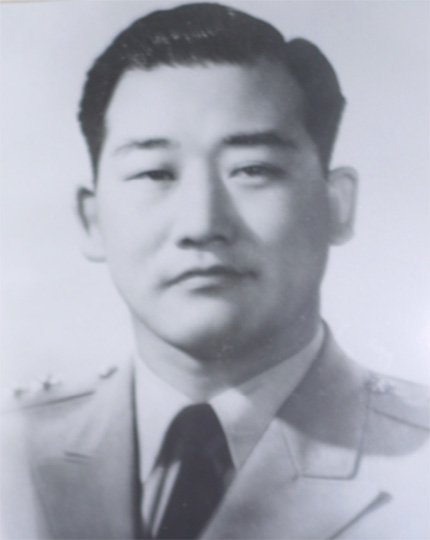

Minister of National Defense
- In office 28 February 1968 – 5 August 1968
- President: Park Chung Hee
- Preceded by: Kim Seong-eun
- Succeeded by: Im Chung-sik

Chairman of the Joint Chiefs of Staff
- In office 29 August 1960 – 8 October 1960
- Preceded by: Yu Jae-Hyung
- Succeeded by: Kim Jong-oh

Member of the National Assembly
- In office 1967–1980

Personal details
- Born: 1 March 1921 Keijō, Korea, Empire of Japan
- Died: 11 January 2006 (aged 84) Seoul, South Korea
- Resting place: Daejeon National Cemetery
- Citizenship: South Korean
- Party: Democratic Republican Party; Yushin Political Fraternity
- Other political affiliations: Korean National Party; New Democratic Republican Party; United Liberal Democrats
- Education: Senshu University; George Washington University; Military English School

Military service
- Allegiance: South Korea
- Branch/service: Republic of Korea Army
- Rank: Lieutenant general
- Commands: Republic of Korea Armed Forces
- Battles/wars: Korean War

Choi Young-hee (Korean: 최영희; March 1, 1921 – January 11, 2006) was a South Korean military officer turned politician. He served as a member of the National Assembly for four terms (7th, 8th, 9th, and 10th) and as the Minister of National Defense.

== Biography ==
He served as the Chief of Staff of the Republic of Korea Army and Chairman of the Joint Chiefs of Staff, holding the rank of Lieutenant general in the Republic of Korea Army. He first entered the National Assembly as a proportional representation member for the Democratic Republican Party during the 7th term and went on to serve four consecutive terms up to the 10th, representing both the Democratic Republican Party and the Yushin Political Fraternity.

His clan seat is Suseong, and his pen name is Byeokpa. He was born in Gyeongseong-bu (present-day Seoul).

Former professor Kim Sang-woo, who served as a member of the 15th National Assembly, is one of his sons-in-law.

He was a classmate of Yu Jae-hung, a retired ROK Army Lieutenant General at Gyeongseong Sampan Elementary School (currently Seoul Samgwang Elementary School). Later, the two were commissioned together as classmates from the Military English School and remained comrades-in-arms in the ROK military until both retired with the rank of Lieutenant General.

He passed away on January 11, 2006. His funeral was conducted as an ROK Army funeral, and he was laid to rest in the Generals' Section of the Daejeon National Cemetery.
