= Great Korea Party =

2012 political party in South Korea

- Leader: Bong Tae-hong
- Founded: March 13, 2012
- Dissolved: April 12, 2012
- Headquarters: 115-8 Mapo-daero, Mapo-gu, Seoul Room 508 on the 5th floor
- Ideology: Conservatism
- Political position: Far-right
- Colours: Blue

Korean name
- Hangul: 대한국당
- Hanja: 大韓國黨
- RR: Daehangukdang
- MR: Taehan'guktang

The Great Korea Party (Korean: 대한국당) was a far-right political party in South Korea. It was founded on 13 March 2012, centred around approximately 500 conservative organisations, with Bong Tae-hong serving as party leader.

In the 2012 South Korean legislative election, the party fielded one candidate for a constituency seat and one for a proportional representation seat. However, failing to secure a single victory and falling short of the required vote share, the party had its registration revoked by the National Election Commission.

== Election results ==
Year	Election	Constituencies		Proportional representation		Total	
		Seats won	Win rate	Seats won	Vote share	Seats won	Win rate
2012	19th National Assembly election	0/246	0%	0/54	0.06%	0/300	0%
