= Green Social Democratic Party =

2004 political party in South Korea

- Leader: Chang Ki-pyo
- Founded: February 22, 2004
- Dissolved: April 18, 2004
- Merger of: Green Peace Party; Social Democratic Party of Korea
- Ideology: Social democracy Progressivism; Green politics
- Political position: Centre-left
- Colours: Light green

Korean name
- Hangul: 녹색사민당
- Hanja: 綠色社民黨
- RR: Noksaek samindang
- MR: Noksaek samindang

Green Social Democratic Party (Korean: 녹색사민당) was a South Korean political party advocating for social democracy, progressivism and green politics that existed from 22 February 2004 to 18 April 2004. It was founded through the merger of the Green Peace Party and Korean Social Democratic Party. Although it participated in the 2004 South Korean legislative election held on 15 April 2004, its party registration was revoked by the National Election Commission on 18 April 2004, due to failing to meet the required vote share threshold.

== History ==
On 5 February 2004 Park Chang-hwa and Jeong Hae-hun (co-leaders of the Green Peace Party) and Chang Ki-pyo (leader of the Korean Social Democratic Party), announced the merger of their two parties with the aim of "eradicating corrupt politics, overcoming the economic crisis, preserving the green environment, and establishing social welfare." They subsequently founded the Green Social Democratic Party at a merger convention held on 22 February 2004, at the Weightlifting Gymnasium in Seoul's Olympic Park. The Green Social Democratic Party identified itself as a social democratic party and put forward "realising green politics, environmental preservation, anti-war peace, a gender-equal society, and an advanced welfare society" as its core policies. Park Chang-hwa, Jeong Hae-hun, Park Young-ho, Kang Seong-cheon, and Lee Byung-kyun served as supreme council members.

For the 2004 South Korean Legislative Election the party nominated 28 constituency candidates and six proportional representation candidates. However, all constituency candidates lost their races, and in the proportional representation vote the party secured 103,845 votes, 0.49% of the vote share, resulting in no candidates being elected and the party failing to enter the National Assembly. Consequently, on 18 April 2004, the National Election Commission revoked the party's registration because it failed to reach the 2% valid vote threshold required in the election.
