= Choi Bae-geun =

South Korean economist (born 1959)

- 최배근
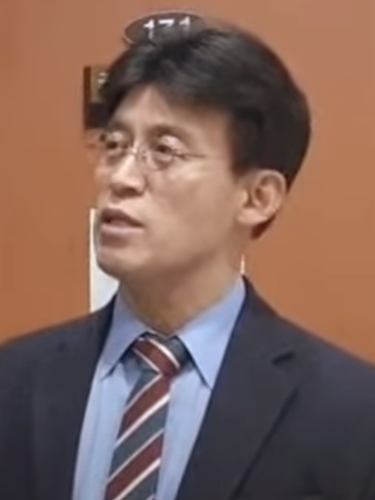

President of the Platform Party
- In office 8 March 2020 – 16 April 2020; Serving with Woo Hee-jong
- Preceded by: Position established
- Succeeded by: Vacant

Personal details
- Born: 12 April 1959 (age 67) Seoul, South Korea
- Party: Democratic
- Other political affiliations: Our Future (-2020); Platform (2020)
- Education: Konkuk University; University of Georgia
- Occupation: Educator, economist, politician

Korean name
- Hangul: 최배근
- RR: Choe Baegeun
- MR: Ch'oe Paegŭn

Choi Bae-geun (Korean: 최배근, born 12 April 1959) is a South Korean economist, educator and politician who served as the president of the Platform Party, along with Woo Hee-jong.

== Career ==
He studied economics at Konkuk University and University of Georgia. He has been lecturing at Konkuk University since 1990. He has been involved in various organisations, including People's Solidarity for Participatory Democracy, Munhwa Broadcasting Corporation and so on. In 2004, he was briefly a columnist of Hankyoreh.

In 2007, he became one of the co-Presidents of the Onward Korea, a political organisation that never became an official political party. He later joined the Our Future (now Future Party) but quit later. In 2020, he founded a new political party, named the For the Citizens (soon renamed as Platform Party), along with Woo Hee-jong. He resigned on 16 April, whereas Woo remained till the party was merged into the Democratic Party on 13 May.

== Ideology ==
Choi is very critical towards the economic policies of the Moon Jae-in cabinet. In December 2018, he cited that Moon, who called himself as a "pro-labour" was forwarding a failed labour reforms. As an example, he added Moon's original manifesto to increase the minimum wage was not fulfilled. He also denounced that Moon's policies were more right-wing than Lee Myung-bak and Park Geun-hye due to the several projects i.e. privatisation.

In 2019, he harshly criticised Japan under Shinzo Abe, citing that Shinzo wants to establish a pro-Japan government in South Korea.

== Criticisms ==
In 2019, Choi joined protests supporting Cho Kuk as the Minister of Justice, shortly after the minister had resigned following the controversies. Choi then shouted in front of people, "Dear Cho Kuk, you're our eternal Justice Minister!" Shortly before this, he condemned the prosecutor and anti-government medias for infringing the former Justice Minister, like what they had done to the ex-President Roh Moo-hyun 10 years ago. When Choi founded the Platform Party, Kim Jin-tae, a United Future MP denounced the party as a "pro-Cho Kuk party", citing a Choi's remarks (calling the ex-Minister as the "eternal") in October 2019.
