= Jeon Han-gil =

South Korean political appointee (born 1964)

- 전한길
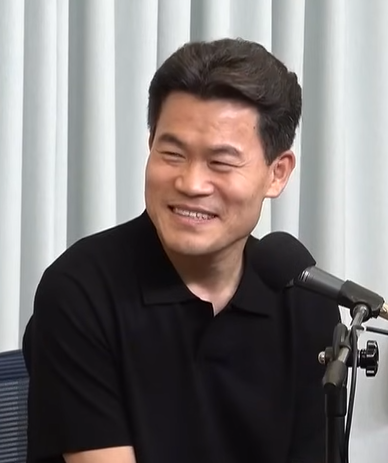
- Jeon in 2023
- Born: Jeon Yu-kwan; August 21, 1970 (age 56); North Gyeongsang Province, South Korea
- Occupations: Teacher, instructor

Jeon Yu-kwan (Korean: 전유관; born August 21, 1970), known professionally as Jeon Han-gil (전한길), is a South Korean history lecturer and far-right political activist. He has taught at various educational institutions, including Megastudy for the CSAT, EBS Educational Broadcasting, Willbes Academy for civil service exams, and Gongdangi. He taught Korean history at MegaGongmuwon until his retirement on May 14, 2025.

== 2024 South Korean martial law crisis ==
On January 19, 2025, on his YouTube channel Flower than Jeon Han-gil, he sparked controversy by claiming that the root cause of the 2024 South Korean martial law crisis was election fraud by the National Election Commission. Although he claimed not to be far-right, after posting about election fraud conspiracy theories, he has been regarded as a speaker for the far-right. He attended various anti-impeachment rallies as a main speaker and had a significant influence.

== 2026 South Korean local election rerun protests ==
Following the 2026 local elections, Jeon Han-gil alleged electoral fraud in connection with ballot shortages reported at some polling stations. He participated in rallies calling for the annulment of the election results and the holding of a new election.
