= Awakened Citizens Solidarity Party =

2020–2024 political party in South Korea

Awakened Citizens' Solidarity Party
- Leader: Lee Min-gu
- Founded: March 24, 2020
- Dissolved: April 16, 2024
- Split from: Democratic Party
- Succeeded by: New Future Party
- Headquarters: 3 Eunhaeng-ro, Yeongdeungpo District, Seoul
- Ideology: Liberalism; Pro-Moon Jae-in
- Political position: Centre-left
- Colors: Navy Blue

Website
- awakecitizen.kr archived

Korean name
- Hangul: 깨어있는시민연대당
- Hanja: 깨어있는市民連帶黨
- RR: Kkaeeo inneun simin yeondaedang
- MR: Kkaeŏ innŭn simin yŏndaedang

The Awakened Citizens' Solidarity Party (Korean: 깨어있는시민연대당) was a South Korean political party founded in 2020 primarily by supporters of Moon Jae-in, the 19th President of South Korea.

It declared its support for People Power Party candidate Yoon Suk Yeol in the 20th Presidential election held in 2022. Subsequently, in 2024, its registration was revoked under the Political Parties Act because it failed to meet maintenance requirements, having participated in none of the elections, including those for the National Assembly, heads of local governments, and members of city and provincial councils, held upon the expiration of four-year terms.

The party styled itself as anti-Lee Jae Myung.

== Elections ==
=== National Assembly elections ===
Year	Election	Constituencies		Proportional representation		Total seats	
Year	Election	Seats won	Seat share	Seats won	Vote share	Seats won	Seat share
2020	21st	0/253	0%	0/47	0.05%	0/300	0%

=== Local elections ===
Year	Election	Metropolitan and provincial executive		Municipal and district executive		Metropolitan and provincial councils		Municipal and district councils	
Year	Election	Seats won	Seat share	Seats won	Seat share	Seats won	Seat share	Seats won	Seat share
2022	8th	0/17	0%	0/226	0%	0/872	0%	0/2,988	0%
