= Lee Han-dong =

South Korean politician (1934–2021)

His Excellency Lee Han-dong
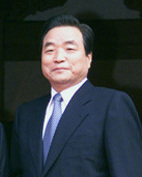

33rd Prime Minister of South Korea
- In office 23 May 2000 – 26 June 2000 (acting)
- President: Kim Dae-jung
- Preceded by: Park Tae-joon
- Succeeded by: Himself
- In office 26 June 2000 – 10 July 2002
- President: Kim Dae-jung
- Deputy: Jin Nyum; Han Wan-sang; Lee Sang-joo
- Preceded by: Himself
- Succeeded by: Chang Sang (acting); Jeon Yun-churl (acting); Chang Dae-whan (acting); Kim Suk-soo

Personal details
- Born: 5 December 1934 Keiki Province, Korea, Empire of Japan
- Died: 8 May 2021 (aged 86) Pocheon, Gyeonggi Province, South Korea
- Education: Seoul National University

Korean name
- Hangul: 이한동
- Hanja: 李漢東
- RR: I Handong
- MR: I Handong

Lee Han-dong (Korean: 이한동; 5 December 1934 – 8 May 2021) was a South Korean politician who served as the Prime minister of South Korea from May 2000 to July 2002.

== Early life ==
Born in Bucheon, Gyeonggi Province on 5 December 1934, he graduated from Kyungbuk High School and entered the Faculty of Law at Seoul National University.

== Career ==
He served as a member of parliament from 1981 to 2000. He served as Prime Minister from 2000 to 2002 under then President Kim Dae-jung In 2002 Vowing to eradicate regionalism and corruption in 2004, he was indicted without jail on charges of embezzling 200 million won (US$170,000) in illegal political funds from SK Group during the presidential election. The Seoul Central District Court sentenced him to two years in prison suspended and ordered him to pay 200 million won in compensation.

== Election results ==
Year	Elections	Constituency	Political party	Votes (%)	Results
1981	11th National Assembly General Election	Yeoncheon–Pocheon–Gapyeong (Gyeonggi)	DJP	48,877 (43.33%)	Won
1985	12th National Assembly General Election	Yeoncheon–Pocheon–Gapyeong (Gyeonggi)	DJP	68,793 (54.95%)	Won
1988	13th National Assembly General Election	Yeoncheon–Pocheon (Gyeonggi)	DJP	57,531 (64.51%)	Won
1992	14th National Assembly General Election	Yeoncheon–Pocheon (Gyeonggi)	DUP	51,920 (57.92%)	Won
1996	15th National Assembly General Election	Yeoncheon–Pocheon (Gyeonggi)	NKP	52,048 (62.50%)	Won
2000	16th National Assembly General Election	Yeoncheon–Pocheon (Gyeonggi)	ULD	42,678 (52.96%)	Won
2002	2002 Presidential Election	South Korea	OPU	74,027 (0.30%)	Defeated (4th)
