= Korean Coalition for the Future =

2002 political party in South Korea

Korean Coalition for the Future 한국미래연합
- Leader: Park Geun-hye
- Founded: May 17, 2002
- Dissolved: November 19, 2002
- Split from: Grand National Party
- Merged into: Grand National Party
- Membership: 8,220
- Ideology: Conservatism; Pro-Park
- Political position: Right wing
- Colours: Orange (#FB4B00)
- National Assembly: 1 / 272
- Metropolitan Mayors and Governors: 0 / 16
- Head of local government: 0 / 332
- Provincial and Metropolitan Councillors: 2 / 682

Website
- www.miraeyonhap.or.kr (archived)

Korean name
- Hangul: 한국미래연합
- Hanja: 韓國未來聯合
- RR: Hanguk mirae yeonhap
- MR: Han'guk mirae yŏnhap

Korean Coalition for the Future (Korean: 한국미래연합) was a political party founded on 17 May 2002. It was established by Park Geun-hye after she left the Grand National Party. Its abbreviated name was the Future Coalition. In the 2002 South Korean local elections after its founding, the party secured seats in metropolitan and provincial councils. It held one seat in the National Assembly, occupied by Park Geun-hye. On 19 November 2002, ahead of the 2002 South Korean presidential election, the party merged back into the Grand National Party.

== Election results ==
=== Local election results ===
Year	Election	Metropolitan mayor/governor		Municipal head		Metropolitan council		Municipal council	
Year	Election	Elected	Share	Elected	Share	Elected	Share	Elected	Share
2002	3rd	0/16	0%	0/227	0%	2/682	0.29%	—	—

== See also ==
- Park Geun-hye
- Grand National
