= Let's go! Peace and Human Rights Party =

2016–2024 political party in South Korea

Let's Go! Peace and Human Rights Party
- Abbreviation: Peace and Human Rights Party
- Leader: Choi Yong-sang; Lee Jeong-hee
- Founded: March 21, 2016
- Dissolved: April 16, 2024
- Headquarters: Saemunan-ro 5-ga-gil, Jongno-gu, Seoul
- Membership (2023): 6,481
- Ideology: Progressivism; Youth politics Multiculturalism; Pacifism; Participatory democracy
- Political position: Centre to centre-left
- Colours: Green
- National Assembly: 0 / 300
- Metropolitan Mayors and Governors: 0 / 17
- Municipal Mayors: 0 / 227
- Provincial and Metropolitan Councillors: 0 / 933
- Municipal Councillors: 0 / 3,034

Korean name
- Hangul: 가자!평화인권당
- Hanja: 가자!平和人權黨
- RR: Gaja! pyeonghwa ingwondang
- MR: Kaja! p'yŏnghwa inkwŏndang

Let's Go! Peace and Human Rights Party (Korean: 가자!평화인권당) was a South Korean political party founded for the purpose of protecting the human rights of the Japanese military "comfort women" and other victims of forced mobilisation.

== History ==
On 21 March 2016, the party was founded as the Japanese Imperial Forced Mobilisation Victims Japanese Military Comfort Women Human Rights Party (abbreviated as Japanese Imperial, Comfort Women, Human Rights Party), and three days later, on 24 March, it changed its name to the Japanese Imperial Forced Mobilisation Victims and Japanese Military Comfort Women Human Rights Party.

On 6 February 2017, the name was changed to the Human Rights Party, and on 10 February 2020, the Preparatory Committee for the Peace and Unification Party joined, and the name was changed again to Let's Go! Peace and Human Rights Party.

It was dissolved on 16 April 2024 in accordance with the Political Parties Act, as it had not participated in any elections for four years since the 2020 South Korean legislative election.

== Controversy ==
=== Claim of elimination based on Park Geun-hye's photo ===
The Let Go! Peace and Human Rights Party protested the exclusion of Choi Yong-sang from the Platform Party's proportional representation list, saying "the Democratic Party is worse than Abe". He claimed that he was eliminated because he took a photo with Park Geun-hye.

== Major election results ==
=== National Assembly election ===
Year	Election	Single-member districts		Proportional representation		Total seats	
		Seats won	Vote share	Seats won	Vote share	Seats won	Vote share
2016	20th	0/253	0%	0/47	0.10%	0/300	0%
2020	21st	0/253	0%	0/47	0.03%	0/300	0%
