= Park Byung-kwon =

South Korean military personnel (1920–2005)

- 박병권
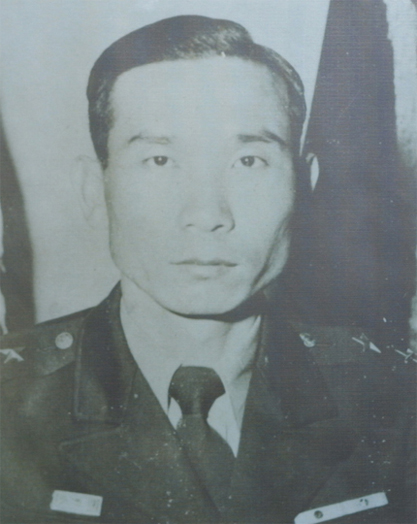

Minister of National Defense
- In office 10 July 1961 – 16 March 1963
- President: Yun Po-sun; Park Chung Hee
- Preceded by: Song Yo-chan
- Succeeded by: Kim Seong-eun

Personal details
- Born: 8 January 1920 Keijō, Korea, Empire of Japan
- Died: 20 September 2005 (aged 85) Seoul, South Korea
- Resting place: Daejeon National Cemetery
- Citizenship: South Korean
- Party: Independent
- Education: Yonhi College; Korea Military Academy

Military service
- Allegiance: South Korea
- Branch/service: Republic of Korea Army
- Rank: Lieutenant general
- Unit: 5th Infantry Division
- Commands: 9th Infantry Division
- Battles/wars: Korean War

Park Byung-kwon (Korean: 박병권; January 8, 1920 – September 20, 2005) was a South Korean military officer and politician who served as the 14th Minister of National Defense of South Korea.

He was a member of the Miryang Park clan and was born in Nonsan-gun, South Chungcheong Province.

== Biography ==
Born on January 8, 1920, in Nonsan, South Chungcheong Province, he entered the Department of Liberal Arts at Yonhi College in 1940 and obtained his bachelor's degree in 1944; that same year, he was forcibly conscripted as a student soldier.

Following Korea's liberation, he initially joined and was active in the Joseon Student Soldier League. However, he later withdrew—along with figures such as Min Ki-sik and Choi Seok to join the Student Soldier Corps and oppose the League. When the United States Army Military Government in Korea established the Military English School on December 5, 1945, he applied and passed the first round of admissions on January 5, 1946.

After being commissioned as an Army second lieutenant, he participated in the founding of the Korean Constabulary Defense. Following his service with Company A of the 1st Regiment in Seoul, he traveled to Busan, where he was involved in conducting recruitment activities.

He was promoted to Army major in February 1947 and served as the regiment's third commander starting in December of that year. On July 25, 1948, he was transferred to the Department of National Defense (the predecessor to the current Ministry of National Defense). He served as an aide-de-camp to the first Minister of National Defense, Lee Beom-seok, before being appointed in January 1949 as the Chief of Academic Affairs and a battalion commander within the Korea Military Academy's cadet corps. Subsequently, in October 1949, he was promoted to Army Colonel and assumed command of the cadet corps regiment.

When the Korean War broke out in 1950, he conducted delaying operations as the Chief of Staff of the 5th Infantry Division. Four months later, in October 1950, he was promoted to Deputy Commander of the 5th Infantry Division and led operations to suppress communist guerrillas in areas such as Jirisan, Gimcheon, and Yeongju. The following year, in February 1951, he participated in the Battle of Hongcheon, and in March, he was transferred to serve as Deputy Commander of the 2nd Infantry Division. On June 30, he was promoted to Brigadier General and led operations including the Battle of Omisan in Yeongyang, North Gyeongsang Province, and the advance on Sachang-ri.

On August 15, 1951, he assumed command of the 9th Infantry Division. He reorganized and trained the division—which was under the direct control of Army Headquarters—before moving it to Cheorwon, Gangwon Province; from November to December, he commanded the division during the Battle of Arrowhead Hill and Battle of White Horse Hill.

In May 1952, he was dispatched to the United States Army Command and General Staff College in Kansas, and while stationed there, he was promoted to Major General in May 1953. In June 1953, after a year abroad, he returned to active duty in Korea and assumed command of the 5th Infantry Division. Following the armistice, he served primarily in the field of military education, holding successive appointments as superintendent of the Korea Military Academy in March 1954 and Deputy Commandant of the National Defense College in August 1955. After serving as Commander of the 1st Military District (October 1955) and Commander of the 6th Military District (August 1958), he was appointed Commander of the 2nd Training Center under the Army Training Command (currently the Army Nonsan Training Center) in March 1959. He became Commander of the III Corps in 1960, and was subsequently appointed Assistant Chief of Staff for Personnel at Army Headquarters in August 1960 and Commander of the Combat Arms Training Command in November of the same year. He was promoted to Lieutenant General on July 8, 1961, and retired from active duty the following day, July 9, 1961.

Immediately after his retirement, on July 10, 1961, he was appointed the 14th Minister of National Defense, following the May 16 coup and accompanied Park Chung Hee, Chairman of the Supreme Council for National Reconstruction, on a visit to the United States. During the transition to civilian rule in 1962, he argued against Park Chung-hee's participation in the new government; when Park attempted to declare martial law, he as the responsible Minister of National Defense vehemently opposed the move. Consequently, he was abducted and subsequently released, after which he resigned from his post effective March 16, 1963.

On July 31, 1965, he participated in the launch of the National Council for the Defense of the Fatherland, comprising retired generals, religious figures and academic representatives, and signed a statement opposing the Korea-Japan Treaty. He joined the nationwide movement to block the ratification of the treaty; he was arrested on August 29 but was released on bail on October 25.

On July 8, 1966, he announced his entry into the Minjung Party but withdrew and left the party just two days later, on July 10; the following year, on March 8, 1967, he joined the Democratic Republican Party. After leaving the Democratic Republican Party on August 21, 1969, he was appointed president of the state-run Korea Tungsten Mining Company in 1970, a position he held until February 1977. In December 1987, he was named chairman of the National Unity Subcommittee under the Committee for the Promotion of Democratic Harmony. He later served as an advisor to Korea Line Corporation and passed away on September 20, 2005. His honors include the Order of Military Merit and the Order of Service Merit (First Class).

He earned a bachelor's degree from Yeonhui College (now Yonsei University) in 1944 and was conscripted into the Japanese military as a student soldier that same year. In 1946, he graduated from the Military English School and embarked on a military career, serving as a division commander during the Korean War. After the Korean Armistice Agreement, he held positions such as superintendent of the Korea Military Academy, Commander of the Army's 2nd Training Center (now the Nonsan Army Training Center), and Corps Commander; following his tenure as president of Korea Tungsten Mining Company, he was appointed Minister of National Defense after the May 16 military coup.

Prior to the military coup, Park Byung-kwon was a general of such integrity that he was considered—alongside Park Chung-hee—as a potential leader among the reform-minded field-grade officers. He earned great respect among junior officers for rooting out corruption during his tenures as a training center commander and corps commander; notably, while serving as the commander of the Second Training Center, he personally inspected the length of bean sprouts and the quality of the meat soup served to the troops.

Kim Hyong-uk, the former Director of the Korean Central Intelligence Agency, wrote in his autobiography that witnessing Park Byung-kwon logically refute Park Chung-hee's plan for martial law confirmed his stature as a truly great figure—proving that public acclaim is rarely unfounded—and expressed regret that he had not been able to bring Park Byung-kwon into Park Chung Hee's inner circle.
