= Hanaro National Union =

2002–2004 political party in South Korea

- Abbreviation: One National People Unite
- Leader: Lee Han-dong
- Founder: Lee Han-dong
- Founded: November 15, 2002
- Split from: United Liberal Democrats
- Succeeded by: United Liberal Democrats
- Headquarters: central company 3, Eunhaeng-ro, Yeongdeungpo-gu, Seoul
- Membership (2004): 7,418
- Ideology: Centrism; Conservatism; Reformism
- Political position: Centre-right
- Colours: Blue
- National Assembly: 1 / 273

Korean name
- Hangul: 하나로국민연합
- Hanja: 하나로國民聯合
- RR: Hanaro gungmin yeonhap
- MR: Hanaro kungmin yŏnhap

The Hanaro National Union (Korean: 하나로국민연합), name sometimes translated as One National People Unite, was a conservative political party in South Korea that was founded on 15 November 2002, by former Prime Minister Lee Han-dong, who left the United Liberal Democrats and was dissolved on 19 February 2004.

== History ==
Lee Han-dong was elected to the 16th National Assembly of South Korea as a candidate for the United Liberal Democrats (ULD) and served as the party's senior vice president. At the time, the ULD was part of a coalition government with President Kim Dae-jung, known as the "DJP alliance", leading to Lee's appointment as Prime Minister on 29 June 2000. However, he was expelled from the ULD on 7 September 2001, after his decision to remain in the premiership following the collapse of the DJP alliance sparked controversy, he subsequently remained as an independent politician for some time after stepping down as Prime Minister on 10 July 2002.

During the 2002 South Korean presidential election, Lee Han-dong rejected a unification agreement with Roh Moo-hyun and Chung Mong-joon, who were also being discussed as presidential contenders, instead pursued an independent path, pushing for the creation of a new centrist reformist party. The Hanaro National Union held its inaugural convention at the Jamsil Students' Gymnasium in Seoul on 15 November 2002, and nominated Lee Han-dong as both party leader and its candidate for the 2002 South Korean Presidential Election.

The Hanaro National Union attempted to form a parliamentary negotiating bloc in collaboration with lawmakers who had defected from the Millennium Democratic Party and United Liberal Democrats, but the effort was unsuccessful. Lee Han-dong ran in the 2002 South Korean Presidential election held on the 19 December 2002 but was defeated, finishing fourth with 74,027 votes (0.3% of the total). The party voluntarily dissolved on 19 February 2004, after Lee Han-dong rejoined the United Liberal Democrats.

== Key election results ==
=== Presidential election ===
Year	Election	Candidate	Votes	Vote share	Result	Outcome
2002	16th	Lee Han-dong	74,027	0.3%	4th	Lost
