= 2002 South Korean presidential election =

- 19 December 2002
- Registered: 34,991,529
- Turnout: 70.83% (▼9.82pp)
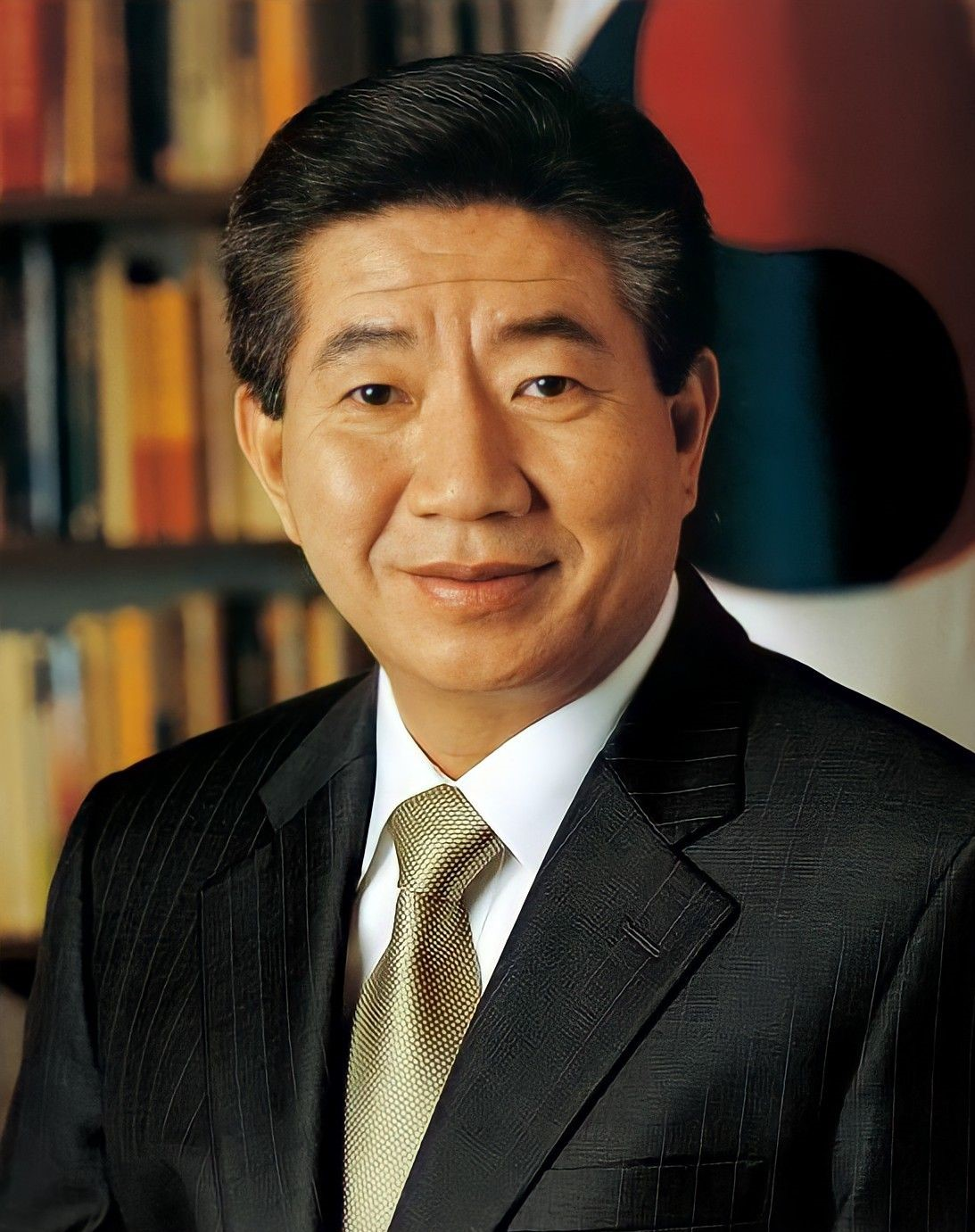

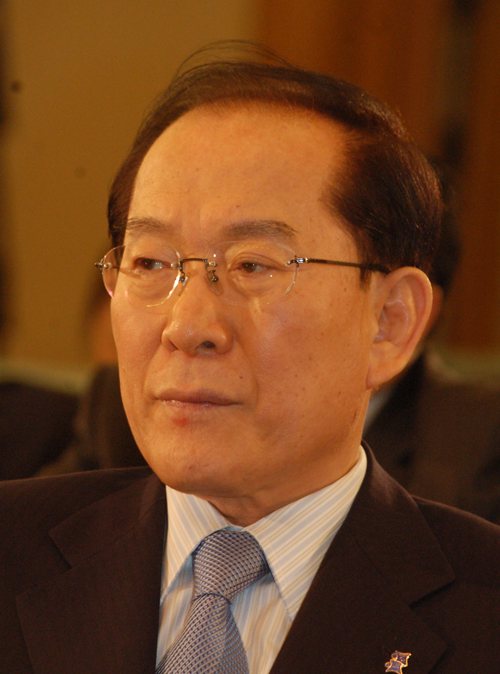
Nominee	Roh Moo-hyun	Lee Hoi-chang
Party	Millennium Democratic	Grand National
Popular vote	12,014,277	11,443,297
Percentage	48.91%	46.59%
President before election
Kim Dae-jung
Independent
Elected President
Roh Moo-hyun
Millennium Democratic

Presidential elections were held in South Korea on 19 December 2002. The result was a victory for Roh Moo-Hyun of the ruling Millennium Democratic Party, who defeated Lee Hoi-chang of the Grand National Party by just over half a million votes.

== Background ==
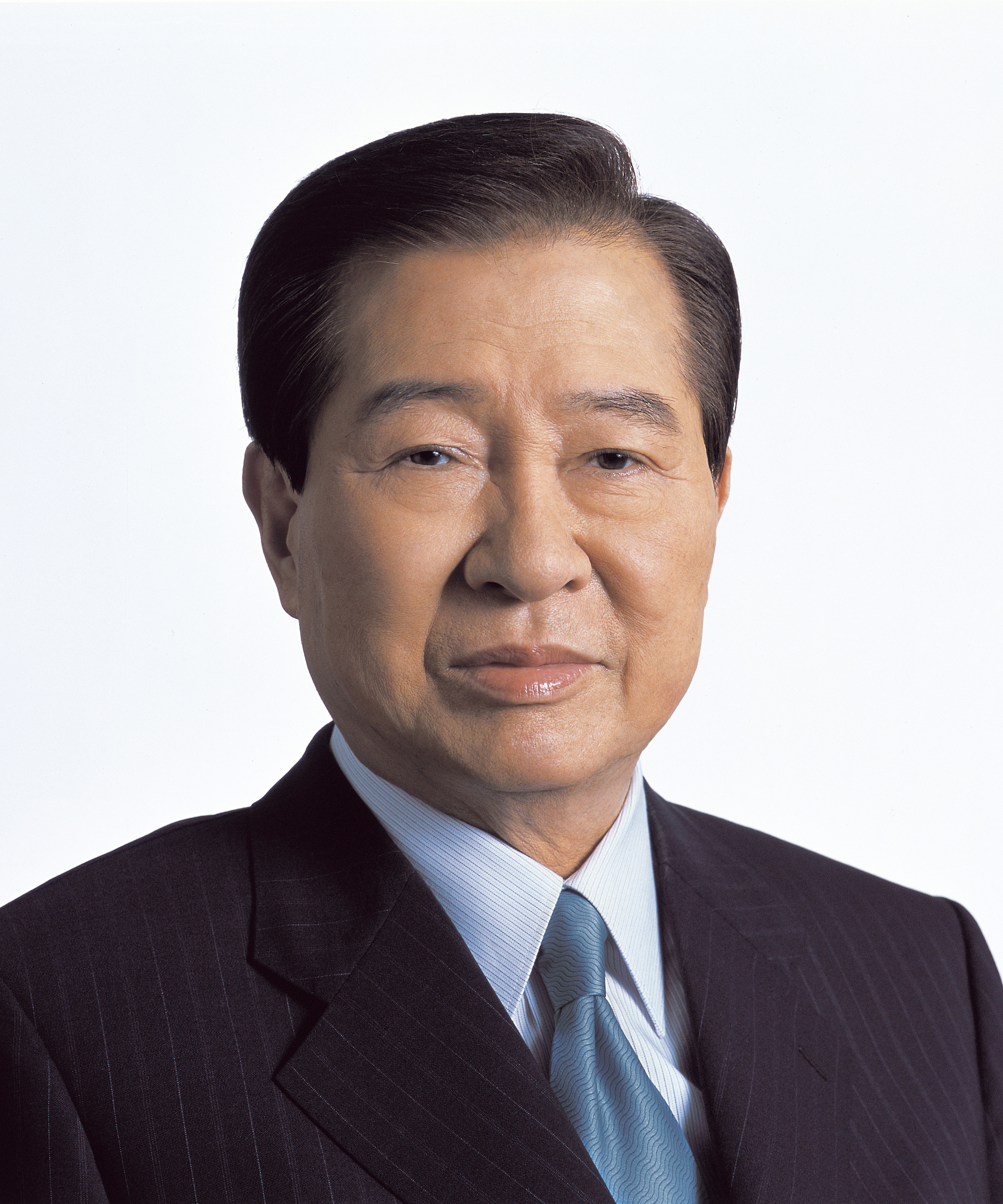
The incumbent in 2002, Kim Dae-jung. His term expired on 25 February 2003.

President Kim Dae-jung's National Congress for New Politics (NCNP) re-branded itself to Millennium Democratic Party (MDP) in 2000, but was struggling as it had been defeated by the Grand National Party (GNP) in both the 2000 legislative election and the 2002 local elections. GNP's then leader and probable presidential nominee Lee Hoi-chang was polling higher than any MDP candidates.

== Primaries ==
=== Millennium Democratic Party ===
For the first time in South Korean history, the Democratic Party nominated its presidential candidate through open primaries.

At the beginning of the primaries, Rhee In-je, the 3-term congressman who ran against President Kim Dae-jung in 1997 but afterwards joined the ruling party, led the other candidates by a considerable margin in every poll. However, fringe candidate Roh Moo-hyun rose to prominence after winning the Gwangju contest, eventually winning his party's nomination and then the presidential election.

==== Candidates ====
- Roh Moo-hyun, former Member of National Assembly from Busan Dong, Seoul Jongno, former Minister of Oceans and Fisheries
- Lee In-je, Member of National Assembly from South Chungcheong Nonsan–Geumsan, former Governor of Gyeonggi, former Minister of Labor
- Chung Dong-young, Member of National Assembly from North Jeolla Jeonju Deokjin
- Kim Joong-kwon, former Member of National Assembly from North Gyeongsang Uljin, former Chief of Staff to the President
- Han Hwa-gap, former Member of National Assembly from South Jeolla Muan–Sinan
- Yu Jong-geun, Governor of North Jeolla
- Kim Geun-tae, Member of National Assembly from Seoul Dobong A

==== Results ====
Contest	Roh Moo-hyun		Chung Dong-young		Lee In-je		Kim Joong-kwon		Han Hwa-gap		Yu Jong-geun		Kim Geun-tae	
Contest	Votes	%	Votes	%	Votes	%	Votes	%	Votes	%	Votes	%	Votes	%
Jeju; 9 March	125	18.6	110	16.4	172	25.6	55	8.2	175	26.1	18	2.7	16	2.4
Ulsan; 10 March	298	29.4	65	6.4	222	21.9	281	27.8	116	11.5	20	2.0	10	1.0
Gwangju; 16 March	595	37.9	54	3.4	491	31.3	148	9.4	280	17.9	–	–	–	–
Daejeon; 17 March	219	16.5	54	4.1	894	67.5	81	6.1	77	5.8	–	–	–	–
South Chungcheong; 23 March	277	14.2	39	2.0	1,432	73.7	196	10.1	–	–	–	–	–	–
Gangwon; 24 March	630	42.5	71	4.8	623	42.0	159	10.7	–	–	–	–	–	–
South Gyeongsang; 30 March	1,713	72.2	191	8.1	468	19.7	–	–	–	–	–	–	–	–
North Jeolla; 31 March	756	34.3	738	33.5	710	32.2	–	–	–	–	–	–	–	–
Daegu; 5 April	1,137	62.3	181	9.9	506	27.7	–	–	–	–	–	–	–	–
Incheon; 6 April	1,022	51.9	131	6.7	816	41.4	–	–	–	–	–	–	–	–
North Gyeongsang; 7 April	1,246	59.4	183	8.7	668	31.9	–	–	–	–	–	–	–	–
North Chungcheong; 13 April	387	32.1	83	6.9	734	61.0	–	–	–	–	–	–	–	–
South Jeolla; 14 April	1,297	62.0	340	16.3	454	21.7	–	–	–	–	–	–	–	–
Busan; 20 April	1,328	62.5	796	37.5	–	–	–	–	–	–	–	–	–	–
Gyeonggi; 21 April	1,191	45.5	1,426	54.5	–	–	–	–	–	–	–	–	–	–
Internet voting 26 April	1,423	81.3	327	18.7	–	–	–	–	–	–	–	–	–	–
Seoul; 27 April	3,924	66.5	1,978	33.5	–	–	–	–	–	–	–	–	–	–
Total	17,577	72.2	6,767	27.8	Withdrew		Withdrew		Withdrew		Withdrew		Withdrew	

=== Grand National Party ===
==== Candidates ====
- Lee Hoi-chang, Member of the National Assembly from Proportional Representation, former Prime Minister, former Chairman of the National Election Commission, former head the Board of Audit and Inspection
- Choi Byung-ryeol, Member of the National Assembly from Seoul Gangnam A, former Mayor of Seoul, former Minister of Labor
- Lee Boo-young, Member of the National Assembly from Seoul Gangdong A
- Lee Sang-hee, Member of the National Assembly from Proportional Representation, former Minister of Science and Technology

==== Results ====
Contest	Lee Hoi-chang		Choi Byung-ryeol		Lee Boo-young		Lee Sang-hee	
Contest	Votes	%	Votes	%	Votes	%	Votes	%
Incheon; 13 April	1,111	79.3	79	5.6	201	14.3	10	0.7
Ulsan; 18 April	446	59.0	206	27.2	73	9.7	31	4.1
Jeju; 20 April	361	73.4	65	13.2	48	12.1	18	2.2
Gangwon; 23 April	891	80.5	101	9.1	71	6.4	44	4.0
North Gyeongsang and Daegu; 24 April	3,143	83.7	427	11.4	133	3.5	54	1.4
North Jeolla; 27 April	505	54.2	117	12.6	278	29.9	31	3.3
South Gyeongsang and Busan; 28 April	2,895	70.1	934	22.6	197	4.8	103	2.5
South Chungcheong and Daejeon; 30 April	1,643	83.6	153	7.8	124	6.3	45	2.3
South Jeolla and Gwangju; 2 May	1,112	54.0	368	17.9	512	24.9	67	3.3
Gyeonggi; 4 May	2,461	71.3	424	12.3	486	14.1	81	2.3
North Chungcheong; 7 May	592	72.3	152	18.6	60	7.3	15	1.8
Seoul; 9 May	2,321	47.9	1,668	34.5	743	15.3	109	2.3
Total	17,481	69.0	4,694	18.3	2,926	11.4	608	2.4

=== Democratic Labor Party ===
Labor activist Kwon Young-ghil of the Democratic Labor Party was nominated for president.

Candidate	Votes	%
Kwon Young-ghil	7,297	90.85
Against	735	9.15
Total	8,032	100.00
Registered voters/turnout	12,877	–

== Campaign ==
Although corruption scandals marred the incumbent government, Lee Hoi-chang's campaign suffered from the wave of Anti-American sentiment in Korea generated by the Yangju highway incident. Public opinion of Lee, who was widely seen as being both pro-U.S. and the preferred candidate of the George W. Bush administration in Washington, D.C., suffered. After losing to Roh by 2% in the December 2002 elections, Lee subsequently announced his retirement from politics.

=== Roh-Chung coalition ===
Chung Mong-joon, the 3-term independent congressman from Ulsan and son of Hyundai founder Chung Ju-yung, became so popular that he began appearing on polls for presidential election after he, as the president of the Korean Football Association, was credited for winning the right to host 2002 FIFA World Cup in Korea.

Chung officially launched his presidential campaign in September, and in many polls beat Roh and came close to beating Lee. Many Democratic politicians that weren't happy with Roh's nomination joined Chung's campaign. However, when it seemed clear that if both Roh and Chung ran, Lee would win easily. The two sides decided to combine forces, instead of competing against each other.

The two sides agreed on conducting two polls, each by different polling companies, where the winner would run as the unified candidate. The winner had to win both polls, or a second round had to occur.

So the two poll was conducted on 24 November, but only one validated. The other one was invalidated, as the two sides had agreed that any poll with Lee Hoi-chang polling less than 30.4% must be invalidated, since there could be a chance that Lee's supporters were attempting to manipulate the results by responding with an untrue answer.

The only poll that was validated was the one conducted by the Research and Research, and it was won by Roh.

Consequently, Chung withdrew his candidacy and endorsed Roh.

24 November 2002
Candidate	Research and Research Poll	# of polls won
Roh	46.8%	1
Chung	42.2%	0
Lee	32.1%	-

However, Chung later broke his pledge on the night before the election, when he felt that Roh broke the promise to include Chung in for policy decisions and surrounded himself only with Democrats. Chung announced less than eight hours before the election that he was withdrawing his support for Roh and urged people to vote their conscience, but Roh won anyway.

== Results ==
Candidate	Party	Votes	%
Roh Moo-hyun	Millennium Democratic Party	12,014,277	48.91
Lee Hoi-chang	Grand National Party	11,443,297	46.59
Kwon Young-ghil	Democratic Labor Party	957,148	3.90
Lee Han-dong	One National People Unite	74,027	0.30
Kim Gil-soo	Fatherland Defenders Party	51,104	0.21
Kim Yeong-gyu	Socialist Party	22,063	0.09
Jang Se-dong	Independent		
Total		24,561,916	100.00
Valid votes		24,561,916	99.10
Invalid/blank votes		223,047	0.90
Total votes		24,784,963	100.00
Registered voters/turnout		34,991,529	70.83

=== By province and city ===
Province/City	Roh Moo-hyun		Lee Hoi-chang		Kwon Young-ghil		Lee Han-dong		Kim Gil-soo		Kim Yeong-gyu	
Province/City	Votes	%	Votes	%	Votes	%	Votes	%	Votes	%	Votes	%
Seoul	2,792,957	51.30	2,447,376	44.96	179,790	3.30	12,724	0.23	6,437	0.12	4,706	0.09
Busan	587,946	29.86	1,314,274	66.75	61,281	3.11	2,148	0.11	2,064	0.10	1,380	0.07
Daegu	240,745	18.68	1,002,164	77.75	42,174	3.27	1,699	0.13	1,317	0.10	810	0.06
Incheon	611,766	49.83	547,205	44.57	61,655	5.02	3,600	0.29	1,978	0.16	1,612	0.13
Gwangju	715,182	95.18	26,869	3.58	7,243	0.96	803	0.11	1,014	0.13	305	0.04
Daejeon	369,046	55.18	266,760	39.88	29,728	4.44	1,157	0.17	1,408	0.21	747	0.11
Ulsan	178,584	35.27	267,737	52.88	57,786	11.41	997	0.20	716	0.14	502	0.10
Gyeonggi	2,430,193	50.65	2,120,191	44.19	209,346	4.36	26,072	0.54	8,085	0.17	4,119	0.09
Gangwon	316,722	41.51	400,405	52.48	38,722	5.08	3,406	0.45	2,713	0.36	969	0.13
North Chungcheong	365,623	50.42	311,044	42.89	41,731	5.75	3,205	0.44	2,610	0.36	949	0.13
South Chungcheong	474,531	52.16	375,110	41.23	49,579	5.45	4,973	0.55	4,322	0.48	1,303	0.14
North Jeolla	966,053	91.59	65,334	6.19	14,904	1.41	2,505	0.24	5,187	0.49	817	0.08
South Jeolla	1,070,506	93.39	53,074	4.63	12,215	1.07	2,830	0.25	6,707	0.59	988	0.09
North Gyeongsang	311,358	21.65	1,056,446	73.47	62,522	4.35	3,332	0.23	2,936	0.20	1,344	0.09
South Gyeongsang	434,642	27.08	1,083,564	67.52	79,853	4.98	2,832	0.18	2,629	0.16	1,224	0.08
Jeju	148,423	56.05	105,744	39.93	8,619	3.25	744	0.28	981	0.37	288	0.11
Total	12,014,277	48.91	11,443,297	46.59	957,148	3.90	74,027	0.30	51,104	0.21	22,063	0.09
Source: National Election Commission
