= Kim Seong-eun (politician) =

South Korean military officer (1924–2007)

- 김성은
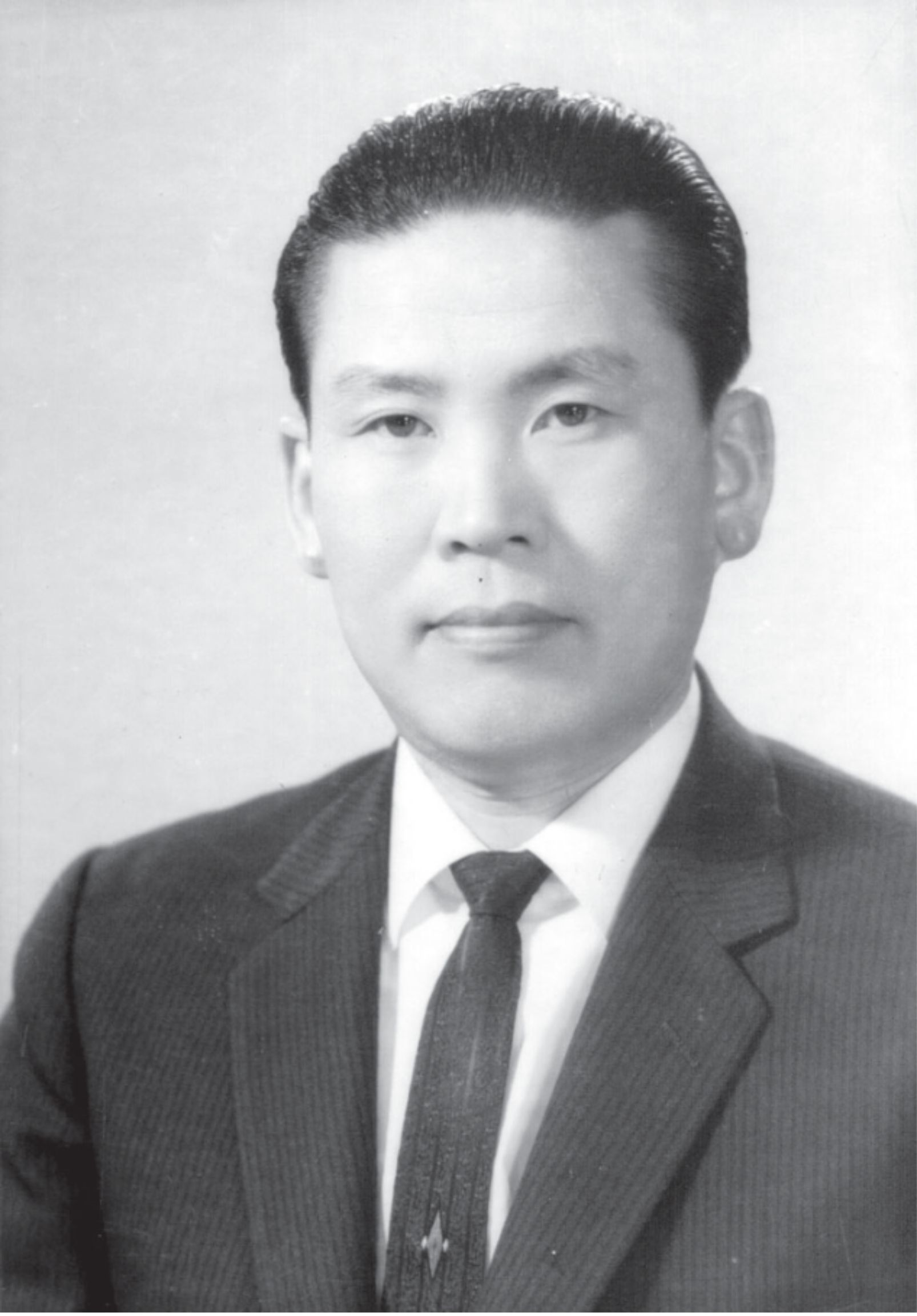

Minister of National Defense
- In office 16 March 1963 – 27 February 1968
- President: Park Chung-hee
- Preceded by: Park Byung-kwon
- Succeeded by: Choi Young-hee

Personal details
- Born: 20 December 1924 Seoul,
- Died: 15 May 2007 (aged 82) Seoul, South Korea
- Resting place: Daejeon National Cemetery
- Citizenship: South Korean
- Party: New Korea Party; United Liberal Democrats
- Education: Korea Naval Academy

Military service
- Allegiance: South Korea
- Branch/service: Republic of Korea Navy
- Rank: Lieutenant general
- Commands: Republic of Korea Marine Corps
- Battles/wars: Korean War

Kim Seong-eun (Korean: 김성은; December 20, 1924 – May 15, 2007) was a South Korean military officer and politician. He served as the 15th Minister of National Defense and as the 4th Commandant of the Republic of Korea Marine Corps.

== Biography ==
Born in Gaeumjeong-ri, Sangnam-myeon, Changwon-gun, South Gyeongsang Province (present-day Gaeumjeong-dong, Seongsan District, Changwon-si), he was commissioned as an ensign (equivalent to the current rank of second lieutenant) in the Republic of Korea Navy in 1946 and joined the Republic of Korea Marine Corps upon its founding in 1949. During the Korean War, he commanded the Battle of Tongyeong—the South Korean military's first independent amphibious operation—a battle credited with giving rise to the Marine Corps' famous nickname, "Ghost-Catching Marines".

Because he neither participated in nor supported the May 16 military coup of 1961, he was ordered to report to Army Headquarters the following day and narrowly escaped assassination alongside the Chiefs of Staff of the Navy and Air Force. He subsequently served as a member of the Military Revolutionary Committee and the Supreme Council for National Reconstruction. He served as the 10th President of the Republic of Korea Veterans Association for eight months (July 18, 1962 – March 4, 1963) and as the 15th Minister of National Defense for five years (March 16, 1963 – February 27, 1968). Notably, he holds the record for the longest tenure of any South Korean Defense Minister and remains the only minister to have come from the Marine Corps. He resigned as Defense Minister, taking responsibility for the January 21 Blue House raid in 1968.

A devout Presbyterian (Tonghap), he attended Shinil Church in Sindang-dong, Seoul, after retiring from the military. During the Roh Moo-hyun administration, he campaigned against the push to transfer wartime operational control led by his later successor, Defense Minister Yoon Kwang-ung. He passed away on May 15, 2007, at Severance Hospital in Sinchon-dong, Seodaemun-gu, Seoul, and was laid to rest in the Generals' Section of the Daejeon National Cemetery.

Kim Seong-eun Hall, an auditorium completed in 2008 within the Republic of Korea Marine Corps Education and Training Group in Pohang, was named in his honor.

== Awards and Honors ==
He was awarded the Taegeuk Order of Military Merit for his contributions during the 1951 Tongyeong Landing Operation and received numerous other decorations, including the Ulji Order of Military Merit (twice), Chungmu Order of Military Merit (twice), the Order of Military Merit (Hwarang), the Order of National Security Merit (Gukseon), and the Order of National Security Merit (Tongil). His international honors include the U.S. Silver Star, the U.S. Legion of Merit (Commander), the U.S. Bronze Star, the U.S. Legion of Merit (twice), as well as the highest orders of merit from Taiwan, Thailand, South Vietnam, and Malaysia.
