= Woo Hee-jong =

South Korean veterinarian and politician (born 1958)

- 우희종
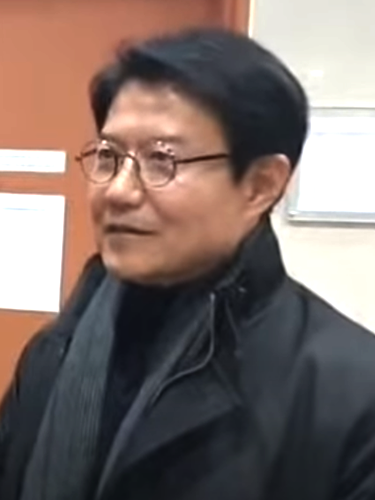

President of the Platform Party
- In office 8 March 2020 – 13 May 2020; Serving with Choi Bae-geun until 16 April 2020
- Preceded by: Position established
- Succeeded by: Position abolished

Personal details
- Born: 21 January 1958 (age 68) Seoul, South Korea
- Party: Democratic
- Other political affiliations: Platform (2020)
- Education: Seoul National University
- Occupation: Educator, politician

Korean name
- Hangul: 우희종
- Hanja: 禹希宗
- RR: U Huijong
- MR: U Hŭijong

Woo Hee-jong (Korean: 우희종, born 21 January 1958) is a South Korean educator and politician. He has been a professor of veterinary science at Seoul National University since 1992. He was one of the co-Presidents of the Platform Party, along with Choi Bae-geun.

Born in Seoul, Woo earned a bachelor's degree in veterinary science at Seoul National University in 1981. He then continued his postgraduate studies at University of Tokyo. Following the graduation, he worked as a lecturer at University of Pennsylvania, Harvard University and Boston University. In 2020, he established a new party, For the Citizens, in which was later renamed as the Platform Party.

Woo harshly criticised the-then President Lee Myung-bak for importing American beef to South Korea, which was related to mad cow disease. Critics denounced him for exaggerating the disease.
