= Korea Business Party =

Political party in South Korea

- Abbreviation: Person of Commerce
- Leader: Chung Jae-hoon
- Founded: March 8, 2024
- Registered: March 18, 2024
- Headquarters: 55, Changsin-gil, Jongno-gu, Seoul
- Membership: 5,796
- Ideology: pro-Small business
- Political position: Single issue
- Colors: Dark Purple; Magenta
- National Assembly: 0 / 300
- Metropolitan Mayors and Governors: 0 / 16
- Municipal Mayors: 0 / 227
- Provincial and Metropolitan Councillors: 0 / 933
- Municipal Councillors: 0 / 3,034

Website
- kbizparty.com

Korean name
- Hangul: 대한상공인당
- Hanja: 大韓商工人黨
- RR: Daehan sanggongindang
- MR: Taehan sanggongindang

The Korea Business Party (Korean: 대한상공인당), also known as the Korea Chamber of Commerce and Industry Party, is a South Korean political party founded in 2024.

== Party platform ==
The Korea Business Party represents the rights and interests of 18.5 million merchants in Korea, including small business owners, small and medium-sized enterprises, and startups; and seeks to improve the status of economically and socially vulnerable groups who require community care, such as the elderly, youth, people with disabilities, victims of consumer fraud, North Korean defectors, recipients of basic livelihood support, legal aid recipients, multicultural families, and workers in vulnerable sectors.

The party supports creating a fair world where everyone lives together in harmony, by striving to protect the rights and interests of small merchants and self-employed individuals in traditional and local markets who are economically weaker than large corporations or large-scale capital, as well as employees of small and medium-sized enterprises and startups in industries such as mining, manufacturing, construction, and transportation. The party aims to do this through the implementation of economic democratisation pursuant to Article 119 of the Constitution and the movement for the protection of small and medium-sized enterprises and consumers pursuant to Articles 123 and 124 of the Constitution.

In addition, the party seeks to realise human dignity and value, the right to pursue happiness, and basic human rights under Article 10 of the Constitution and to secure the right to a decent life under Article 34 of the Constitution.

== Major election results ==
=== National Assembly election ===
Year	Election	Constituency		Proportional representation		Total seats	
		Seats won	Share	Seats won	Vote share	Seats won	Share
2024	22nd	0/254	0%	0/46	0.01%	0/300	0%
