= Shin Ji-ye =

South Korean politician (born 1990)

- 신지예

Co-chair of the Green Party
- In office 2018–2020 Serving with Ha Seung-soo
- Preceded by: Kim Ju-on and Choi Hyeok-bong
- Succeeded by: Sung Mi-sun

Personal details
- Born: June 20, 1990 (age 36)
- Party: Independent (2011–2012; 2020–)
- Other political affiliations: Democratic Labor Party (2011); Green Party (2012–2020); People Power Party (2020–2021) (Note: Joined Yoon Suk-yeol campaign camp but did not join the party)

Shin Ji-ye (Korean: 신지예, born 20 June 1990) is a South Korean politician.

== Biography ==
Shin served as leader of the Korea Youth Association from 2004 to 2005.

In 2018, she ran for Seoul Mayor as the Green Party candidate in the 2018 South Korean local elections. She adopted "Feminist Mayor" as a slogan and championed the necessity of feminist politics. The campaign garnered significant support while simultaneously facing numerous setbacks, including the repeated defacement of campaign posters. Running on a feminist platform, she secured 82,874 votes, finishing fourth (with 1.7% of the vote). During the local elections, campaign posters for Candidate Shin were damaged. According to Candidate Shin’s camp on 6 June 2018, a total of 27 posters were defaced after the official campaign period began on 31 May, when the posters were put up: 21 in Gangnam-gu, and one each in Dongdaemun-gu, Nowon-gu, Guro-gu, Yeongdeungpo-gu, Seodaemun-gu, and Gangdong-gu.

On 22 January 2020, she resigned as co-chair of the Green Party. Subsequently, she ran as an independent candidate in the Seodaemun A district, finishing third with 3.23 percent of the vote.

Also in 2020, Shin went public with the fact that she had been sexually assaulted by a Green Party official. In 2021, the former Green Party official was sentenced to three and a half years in prison and taken into court custody.

In the 2021 Mayor of Seoul by election, Shin ran as an independent candidate and finished sixth with 18,039 votes.

=== Yoon Suk-yeol presidential campaign ===
In December 2021, Shin joined the presidential campaign of Yoon Suk-yeol becoming a senior vice chair of the New Generation Policy Committee. She said she accepted the position because "(Yoon) pledged to resolve violence against women, address the climate crisis and create a Republic of Korea that overcomes (the division of) left and right and moves forward, so I decided to take part." However, following a reshuffle, she resigned from the campaign in 2022.

== Controversy ==
A dispute arose with Lee Jun-seok, a Supreme Council member of the Bareunmirae Party, regarding the "Isu Station assault case," which involved a physical altercation between two women and three men. Shin Ji-ye’s side argued that it was a hate crime against women, maintaining that the women were indeed assaulted regardless of whether any verbal abuse had occurred; conversely, Lee Jun-seok contended that the women were the aggressors, as the female group had directed sexual harassment at the men. Regarding the incident, the Dongjak Police Station announced during a briefing on 16 November 2018 that investigations revealed violence had been committed by both parties, noting that it was one of the women who initiated physical contact.
