= Platform Party =

2020 political party in South Korea

Platform Party 더불어시민당
- Abbreviation: PP
- Founders: Woo Hee-jong; Choi Bae-geun
- Founded: 8 March 2020
- Registered: 16 March 2020
- Dissolved: 13 May 2020
- Succeeded by: Democratic Alliance of Korea (de facto)
- Headquarters: Gukhoe-daero, Yeouido-dong, Yeongdeungpo, Seoul
- Ideology: Liberalism (South Korean)
- National affiliation: Democratic Party; Basic Income Party; Transition Korea
- Colours: Blue

Website
- platformparty.kr

Korean name
- Hangul: 더불어시민당
- Hanja: 더불어市民黨 (Note: 共同市民黨, 共に市民党 or other variants are translated names in Chinese and Japanese.)
- RR: Deobureo simindang
- MR: Tŏburŏ simindang

The Platform Party (Korean: 더불어시민당), also known as Citizen's Party of Korea, was an electoral alliance and political party in South Korea formed in order to run for party-list proportional representation in 2020 South Korean legislative election.

== History ==
The party was originally established by Woo Hee-jong and Choi Bae-geun as For the Citizens (시민을위하여) on 2 March 2020, while condemning the United Future Party for forming its own satellite party, the Future Korea Party, in order to obtain compensatory seats after the passage of a new electoral law. It held its founding congress on 8 March and elected Woo and Choi as its co-Presidents.

For the upcoming general election, the party signed a cooperation agreement with the ruling Democratic Party of Korea, as well as the other minor parties such as the Basic Income Party, Transition Korea, Let's go! Green Party and the Let's Go! Party for Peace and Human Rights. The next day, it changed its name to the current one.

Nearly 75% of members of the Green Party Korea agreed to join the Democrat-led For the Citizens electoral alliance. However, they quickly left as soon as they joined. The Green Party left the electoral alliance after the Democratic Party's Secretary-General Yoon Ho-joong made sexist and transphobic remarks about sexual minorities. Two of the five National Assembly candidates for the Green Party Korea belong to the LGBT Community.

On 25 March, the Democratic Party confirmed that they would send 7 MPs to this party.

Following the 2020 elections, a process was launched to merge or absorb the Platform Party back into the Democratic Party of Korea by 15 May 2020, as its original task of obtaining new compensatory proportional seats in the election was complete. On 13 May, the party declared its merge into the Democratic Party.

== Ideology ==
The party is described as "pro-Moon Jae-in" and/or "pro-Cho Kuk", supporting Cho Kuk as the Minister of Justice. During the cooperation agreement, several left-of-centre parties including the Minjung Party refused to join as they did not want to join an electoral alliance led by pro-Moon figures.

The party's position towards same-sex marriage was not clear, as the Democratic Party did not want to include explicitly pro-LGBT parties in their alliance.

== Election results ==
Election	Leader	Constituency			Party list			Seats	Position	Status
Election	Leader	Votes	%	Seats	Votes	%	Seats	Seats	Position	Status
2020	Woo Hee-jong; Choi Bae-geun				9,307,112	33.36	17 / 47	17 / 300	2nd	Government
