= 2026 South Korean local election rerun protests =

2026 South Korean Local Election Re-run Protests
- Part of Aftermath of the 2026 South Korean local elections
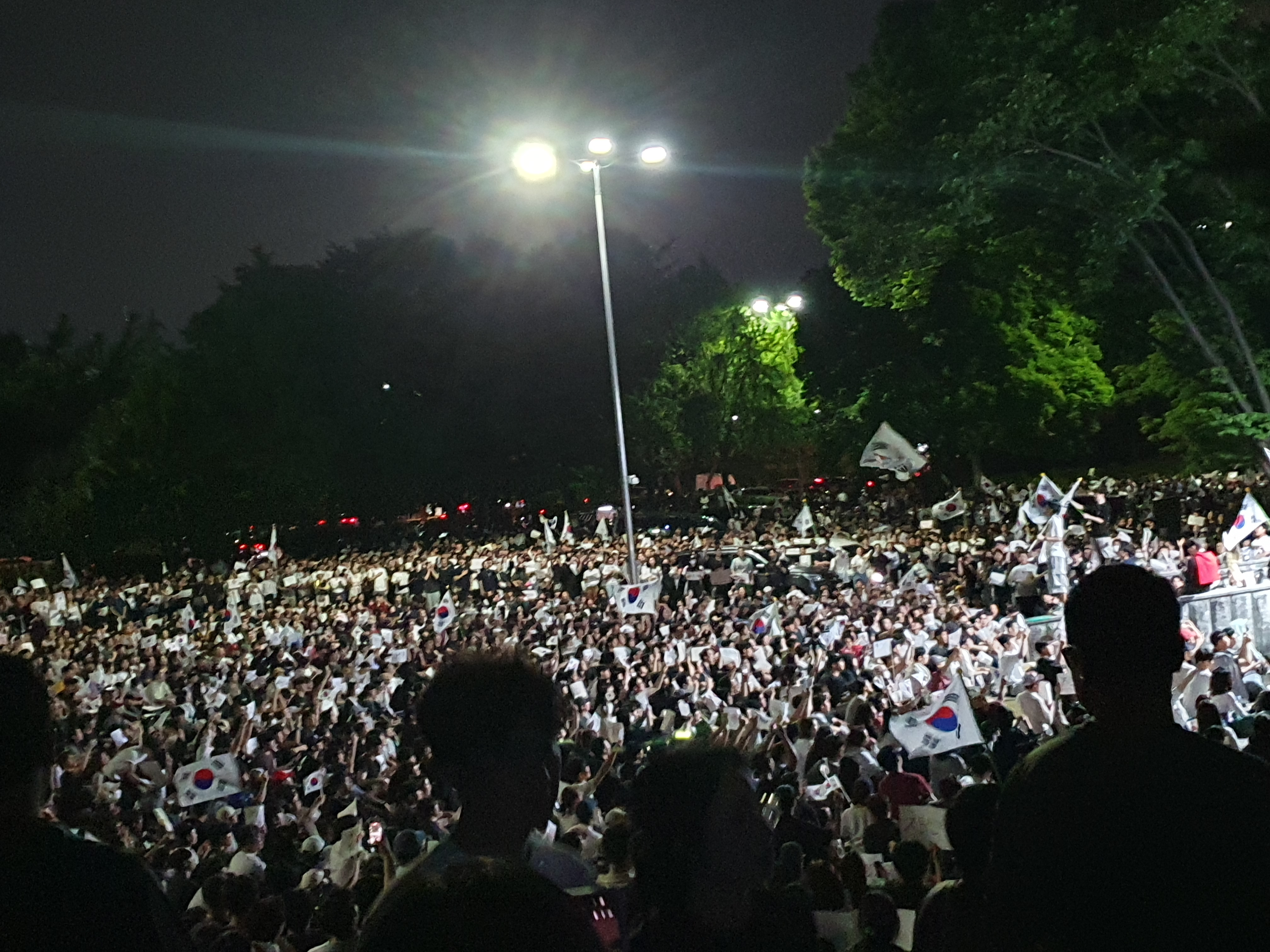
- Protesters at Seoul Olympic Stadium
- Date: June 3, 2026 – present
- Location: Various locations across South Korea, primarily at Seoul Olympic Stadium (Ticketlink Live Arena), Seoul
- Caused by: Ballot paper shortages in the 2026 South Korean local elections
- Goals: Re-run of the local elections; Investigation into election administration failures and alleged electoral fraud; Abolition of early voting
- Methods: demonstrations, rallies, and sit-ins
- Status: ongoing

The 2026 South Korean local election rerun protests are a series of public demonstrations that began on June 3, 2026, following ballot shortages that disrupted voting during the 2026 South Korean local elections. The disruptions have raised concerns about voter disenfranchisement, voter suppression, and election mismanagement. Protesters called for a rerun of the election and investigation into alleged electoral fraud.

Initial demonstrations took place at a polling station in Jamsil and later at the National Election Commission (NEC) headquarters in Gwacheon. The largest demonstration was held at the Jamsil Livelink Arena in Olympic Park from June 5 to October 31, 2026. Smaller demonstrations continue to take place in various cities across South Korea, including Busan, Daegu, and Gwangju.

Protesters demanded a new election and questioned the integrity of the electoral process. The NEC confirmed the ballot shortages and issued a public apology. Protesters argued that the disruptions prevented some voters from casting their ballots and undermined citizens' constitutional right to vote.

The ballot shortages and allegations of corruption within the NEC are currently under investigation by the special counsel investigation team led by Special Counsel Lee Tae-han.

== Background ==
On June 3, 2026, the 2026 South Korean local elections were held across the country to elect mayors, governors, local council members and other local officials. During voting, out of approximately 14,300 polling stations, 140 polling stations ran out of ballot papers, and voting was suspended at 26 stations because replacement ballots did not arrive on time. Songpa District was one of the most affected districts for two reasons. First, several polling stations in the district experienced significant delays during the voting process, and voters were asked to wait for hours for their turn. Second, polling stations closed at the scheduled time, and some voters who were still waiting outside were unable to vote. On June 5, 2026, National Election Commission chairman Roh Tae-ak announced his resignation, accepting responsibility for the ballot shortage controversy.

== Protests ==
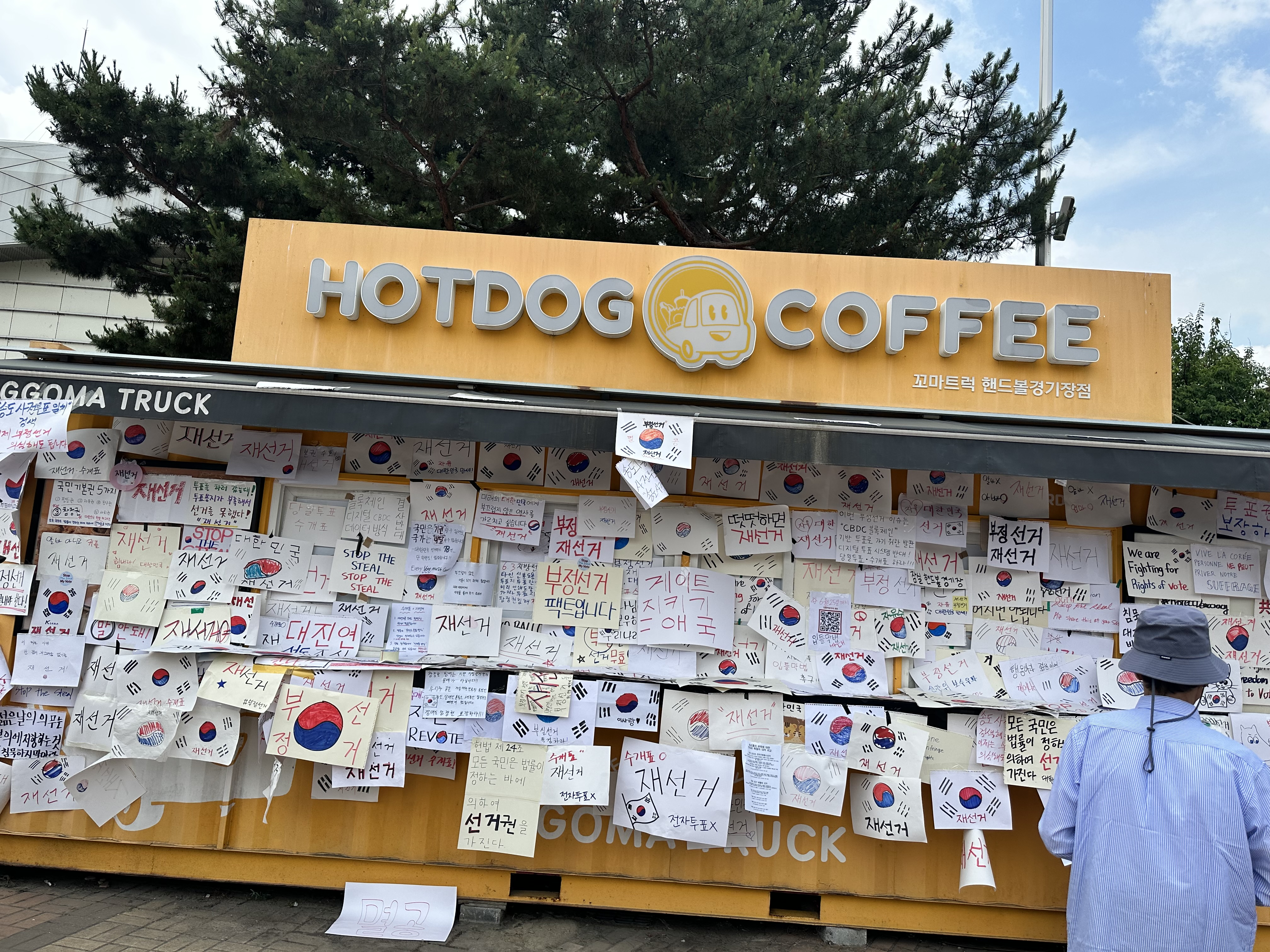
Handwritten posters displayed on a board, featuring messages such as "Election Fraud" and "Same-Day Voting & Hand Ballot Counting"

=== Jamsil 7-dong Protest ===
During the June 3, 2026, South Korean local elections, some voters were unable to cast their ballots due to ballot shortages. Jamsil 7-dong was one of the areas where ballot shortages were reported early in the day. By the end of the day, approximately 200 voters who had been unable to vote began to demonstrate, chanting slogans such as "Re-election" ("재선거"), "Dissolve the NEC" ("선관위 해체"), and "Election Fraud" ("부정선거"), while some attempted to prevent election officials from removing the ballot boxes for counting. The protest was the first demonstration prompted by issues related to the 2026 local elections and continued at the site until June 5. During the demonstration, approximately 1,000 police officers were deployed to ensure the safe transport of the ballot boxes from the polling station to the ballot-counting facility at Olympic Park. According to reports, six people sustained minor injuries during the operation.

=== NEC Headquarters protest ===
While a demonstration was taking place at the Jamsil 7-dong ballot office, some protesters decided to go to the NEC headquarters to express their concerns regarding the ballot shortage issue. According to media reports, on June 4, 2026, approximately 500 protesters gathered outside the headquarters of the National Election Commission in Gwacheon, Gyeonggi Province. The protesters requested that the vote-counting process be halted and the local elections be canceled. Many participants carried South Korean and American flags. Korean history instructor Jeon Han-gil also attended the demonstration along with several YouTubers and journalists. Reports indicated that the number of protesters later increased to approximately 1,000. On June 5, 2026, when ballot boxes were transported to Ticketlink Live Arena at the Olympic Handball Gymnasium for counting, the protesters moved to the venue to continue their demonstration.

=== Jamsil Olympic Park Election Rerun Protest ===
On June 5, 2026, election officials transported the ballot boxes to a ballot-counting facility at Ticketlink Live Arena in Seoul's Olympic Park. Some demonstrators who had been protesting in Jamsil 7-dong and at NEC headquarters moved to Olympic Park. Other concerned citizens who wished to express their views on election-related issues also began to gather at the site. The demonstration grew out of spontaneous citizen participation.

The protest has been referred to by several names, including the "Ol-park protest" (올공 집회, a Korean abbreviation referring to Olympic Park), the "Jamsil Freedom and Democracy Movement" (잠실 자유민주화 운동), and the "Protest for the Protection of Voting Rights" (참정권 수호집회). Some media outlets described the event as the "Jamsil counting center blockade protest" (잠실 개표소 봉쇄 시위) because some demonstrators blocked several entrances to the arena, preventing election officials from entering the facility to count the ballots. According to media reports, approximately 380 ballot boxes containing 2.5 million ballots were stored inside Ticketlink Live Arena.

The protest conveyed two main messages to the government and election officials. First, demonstrators argued that voting rights had been violated and that the 2026 local elections were therefore invalid. Second, they argued that the election process was unreliable, particularly due to NEC's involvement, and called for a lawful and transparent investigation, along with appropriate changes to the election process. To express these messages, participants chanted slogans such as "election fraud" (부정선거), "re-election" (재선거), "same-day voting" (당일투표), and "hand counting" (수개표), while waving South Korean flags and holding handwritten signs.

Media outlets reported that weekend evenings had the highest number of participants, while weekend mornings and weekdays saw lower citizen participation. For example, approximately 19,000 people reportedly participated in the protest on Saturday afternoon, June 13, 2026, and approximately 8,000 participants were present on Sunday afternoon, June 14. By comparison, approximately 700 participants were reported in the early morning of June 13, a smaller group than during the weekend afternoons.

On June 18, 2026, politicians from both liberal and conservative parties formed a special parliamentary committee to ensure a transparent and accurate investigation into the ballot shortages and alleged corruption within the National Election Commission (NEC). It was named the National Election Commission Special Committee for Parliamentary Investigation (Korean: 선관위 국조특위). On July 2, 2026, the committee visited the Olympic Park facility where the uncounted ballots were being stored to assess the security and storage conditions. Members expressed concerns about the lack of security and the overall suitability of the storage area, as the ballots were being kept in the arena's shower facilities. The inspection lasted approximately 35 minutes, and around 1,500 police officers were deployed to the site.

Since July 2026, mainstream media outlets paid less attention to the size of the protest, focusing instead on related social and political issues and developments in investigations into alleged corruption involving the NEC. Updates on the ongoing protests were reported primarily through YouTube channels and independent online news outlets.

On October 12, 2026, the police commissioner expressed concern about the prolonged protest and stated that deploying police to end it was a possible option. On October 28, 2026, a special counsel team led by Lee Tae-han entered the arena at Olympic Park to examine the approximately 2.5 million ballots that had been stored at the site since June. On October 29, it was announced that ballots with no identified issues had been transported to a designated location selected by the NEC, while ballots requiring further investigation would be retained by the special counsel team investigating election-related matters. Special Counsel Lee Tae-han also noted that the examination of the ballots was unrelated to the election results or ballot counting and that its purpose was to support the investigation. People Power Party (PPP) leader Jang Dong-hyeok and Lee Jin-sook, a member of the National Assembly, opposed the transfer of the ballots to another location due to concerns about possible evidence contamination, as did some protesters at the site. More than 450 police officers were deployed to the site for the operation, and no injuries were reported.

After all ballots had been removed from Ticketlink Arena at Olympic Park, the demonstration at Jamsil Olympic Park ended on October 31, 2026. Investigations into alleged election fraud and corruption within the NEC remain ongoing.

== Controversies and Disputes ==
=== Dispute over removal of sports equipment ===
The prolonged protest at Olympic Park created difficulties for the sports industry. According to reports, sports equipment and sports-related documents were stored inside the arena, but athletes and other personnel were unable to retrieve the equipment due to the protest. On June 15, 2026, Korean Sport & Olympic Committee President Ryu Seung-min filed a public complaint about the situation and requested police assistance. On June 16, People Power Party leader Jang Dong-hyeok visited the site and attempted to mediate to allow athletes to retrieve their equipment, but the attempt was unsuccessful due to opposition from protesters. The issue was resolved on September 9, 2026, when approximately 1,800 police officers were deployed, allowing athletes to retrieve their equipment in preparation for the 2026 Aichi-Nagoya Games. No injuries or clashes were reported.

=== Controversy over police conduct ===
==== Police officers' attire and identification ====
On June 22, 2026, some protesters filed complaints regarding the attire and identification of police officers. In response to the ongoing protest at Olympic Park, the police department had deployed several officers to the site to ensure public safety. However, some officers were wearing face masks and sunglasses, making it difficult for protesters to identify them. It was also revealed that some police officers were carrying identification badges belonging to other officers while on duty. Amid the complaints, the police department issued internal guidelines instructing officers to dress appropriately and carry their own identification. Kim Eun-hye, a member of the People Power Party, expressed concern over the issue and stressed the need for greater transparency in police operations.

==== Controversy over remarks by a senior police official ====
On July 2, 2026, media outlets reported that some protesters had filed complaints against Park Jeong-bo, chief of the Seoul Metropolitan Police Agency, over remarks he made to participants at Olympic park on June 15, 2026. According to the reports, Park said, "If you continue to participate in illegal activities such as this one, your entire family will be ruined" (in Korean: "불법행위에 동조하면 패가망신한다"). The protesters considered the remark intimidating and inappropriate. Park was questioned about his remarks during a parliamentary hearing and stated that he did not intend to interfere with anyone's freedom of speech.

=== Controversy over police deployment and response ===
According to media reports, some protesters expressed concerns about the large number of police officers deployed ahead of the National Election Commission Special Committee for Parliamentary Investigation's arrival at Olympic Park on July 2, 2026, to inspect the uncounted ballots. Although no injuries were reported, some physical altercations were reported to have occurred. Some protesters criticized the police response, describing it as overly aggressive and intimidating toward citizens.

== University joint declaration ==
On June 10, 2026, student councils from 18 universities across South Korea issued a joint declaration condemning the ballot shortages that occurred during the 2026 South Korean local elections. In their statement, they expressed concern about violations of voting rights and called for a thorough investigation into the incident and alleged corruption within the NEC.

== Government response ==
=== President's response ===
On June 4, 2026, President Lee Jae Myung expressed deep regret over the ballot shortages, describing the incident as an "incomprehensible loophole" in election administration. He called for a thorough investigation into its causes and stated that all relevant government agencies were responsible for protecting citizens' voting rights. He also urged authorities to take measures to prevent similar incidents in future elections.

On June 7, 2026, President Lee Jae Myung ordered the formation of a joint investigation team comprising prosecutors and police investigators. The Police-Prosecutor Joint Investigation Headquarters (Korean: 검경 합동수사본부) was established on June 9. Lee also called on politicians from both parties to establish a parliamentary fact-finding committee to investigate the matter. In response, the National Election Commission Special Committee for Parliamentary Investigation (Korean: 선관위 국조특위) was launched on June 18.

On June 8, 2026, during a press conference marking the first anniversary of his inauguration, Lee described the ballot shortage crisis as "shocking" and said that the incident had seriously damaged South Korea's reputation as a democratic country. However, he rejected allegations of nationwide electoral fraud. On the same day, Lee met with senior government officials to discuss the ballot shortage crisis and possible reforms to the National Election Commission (NEC). NEC Chairman Roh Tae-ak was absent from the meeting following his announcement that he would step down.

=== NEC's response ===
On June 5, NEC chairman Roh Tae-ak announced his resignation, accepting responsibility for the ballot shortage crisis. Roh expressed deep regret over the administrative failures that had undermined public trust in the electoral system. The NEC also issued a public apology for the ballot shortages but rejected calls for an election rerun and dismissed allegations of election fraud.

=== DPK's response ===
Shortly after the protests began on June 3, 2026, Cho Seung-rae, the chief election campaign director of the Democratic Party of Korea (DKP), stated that "a public apology is not enough" and that the incident requires a thorough investigation, with those responsible being held accountable. However, he also stated that the citizens' demands to halt the vote counting or hold a re-election were "not even worth considering."

=== PPP's response ===
Leaders of the conservative People Power Party (PPP) criticized the ballot shortage crisis, describing it as a violation of voting rights. Jang Dong-hyeok, leader of the PPP, supported the Jamsil Olympic Park protest, which continued until the end of October 2026. He frequently participated in demonstrations, sometimes as a private citizen and at other times in his capacity as a politician. On June 13, 2026, he was seen writing slogans such as "Freedom to speak about election fraud! Freedom of expression!" and "Restoration of voting rights."

On June 6, 2026, Seoul Mayor Oh Se-hoon criticized the National Election Commission (NEC) over the ballot shortage crisis and called for a comprehensive investigation into the matter. Other conservative leaders, including Na Kyung-won and Lee Jin-sook, visited the Olympic Park protest site on June 14, 2026, where they joined citizens in drawing the Taegeukgi, the South Korean flag, and taking photographs with them.

On November 2, 2026, Jang Dong-hyeok gave an interview to MBN, in which he stated that the "ballot shortage crisis itself is enough to call it election fraud" and that "regardless of the election results, in a case like this there should be a re-election." He also referred to the special counsel investigation team's searches and seizures of NEC servers, stating that "the court has acknowledged criminal charges regarding computer manipulation to some extent."

== Inquiry and investigation ==
In response to requests from citizens and calls from politicians of both parties for a thorough investigation into the crisis, the government established a joint police-prosecution investigation team on June 9, 2026. Officially named the Police-Prosecutor Joint Investigation Headquarters (검경합동수사본부), it was headquartered at the Seoul Central District Prosecutors' Office.

The investigation had three main objectives: to investigate alleged corruption within the National Election Commission (NEC), determine the cause of the ballot shortages, and examine whether illegal activities had occurred during the election in connection with allegations of election fraud. On June 13, 2026, the investigation team conducted search and seizure operations targeting the NEC's servers and analyzed the collected materials. On July 20, 2026, the team announced that it was investigating allegations of embezzlement involving NEC employees. On August 7, 2026, the Police-Prosecutor Joint Investigation Headquarters conducted additional search and seizure operations at nine locations, including the National Election Commission, three regional election commissions (Seoul, Gyeonggi, and Chungbuk), and five district election commissions (Gimpo, Uiwang, Jincheon, Seocho, and Gangnam), in connection with allegations of vote-count manipulation. The Joint Investigation Headquarters stated that it had identified signs of vote-count manipulation in several cities.

Following the discovery of multiple suspected cases of vote-count manipulation and lengthy investigations into alleged illegal activities involving NEC employees, the government decided to establish a special counsel team to expand the investigation. On September 7, 2026, a special counsel team led by Lee Tae-han was launched. The team announced that it would investigate 12 allegations, including the ballot shortage crisis. It received all investigation records and seized materials from the Police-Prosecutor Joint Investigation Headquarters. On October 29, the team also took possession of approximately 2.5 million uncounted ballots that had been stored at a facility in Jamsil Olympic Park.

On November 18, 2026, the special counsel team requested arrest warrants for 8 NEC employees on charges including forgery of public records, alteration and use of official documents, and abuse of authority. The investigation remains ongoing.

== See also ==
- 2026 South Korean local elections
- National Election Commission (South Korea)
