= New Political Vision Party (South Korea) =

2014 political organisation in South Korea

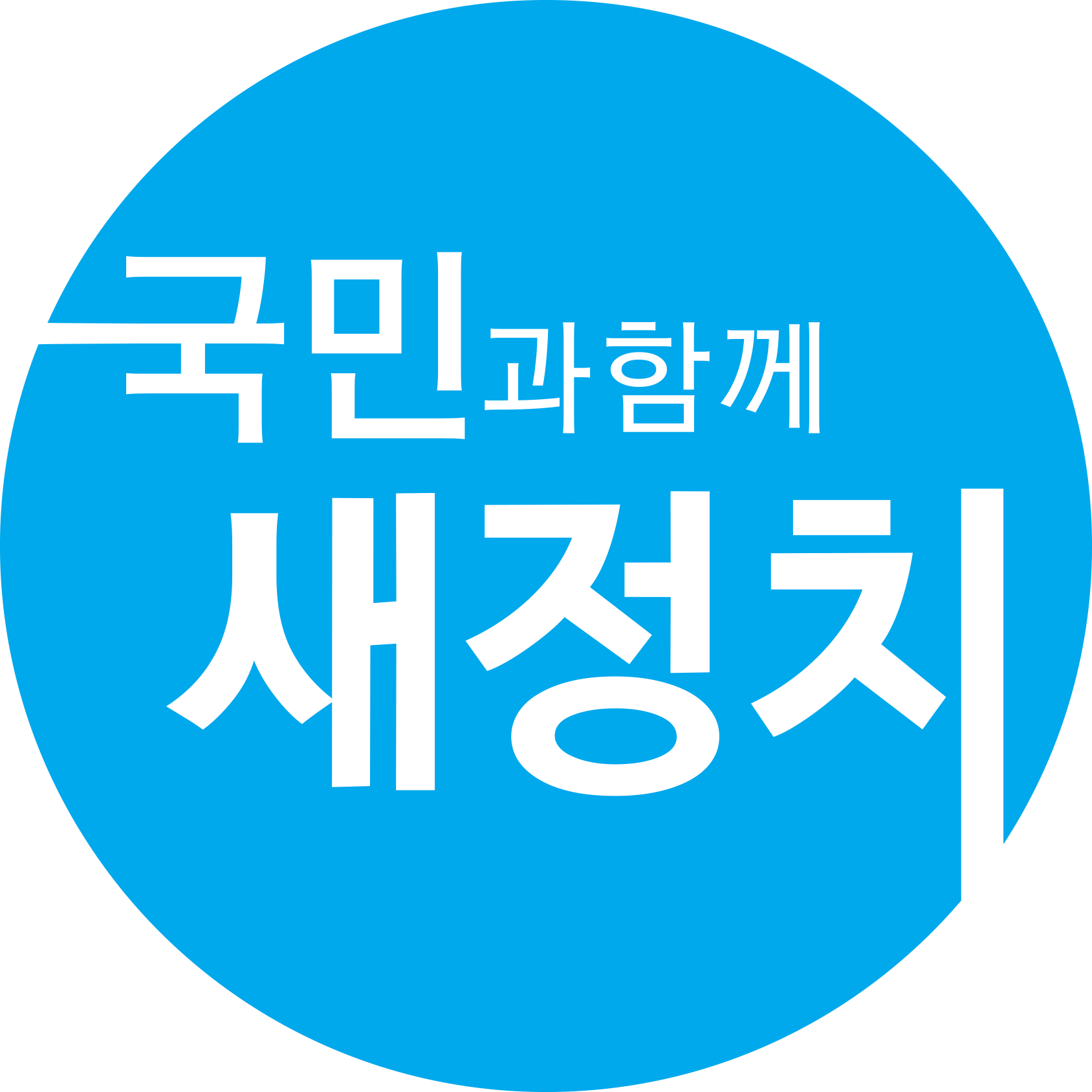
- Chairperson: Yoon Yeo-joon; Park Ho-gun; Yoon Jang-hyun; Kim Hyo-seok; Lee Gye-an; Kim Seong-sik; Hong Geun-myeong
- Founder: Ahn Cheol-soo
- Founded: February 17, 2014 (as Preparatory Committee for Party Founding)
- Dissolved: March 25, 2014
- Merged into: New Politics Alliance for Democracy
- Ideology: Liberalism; Centrist reformism pro-Ahn Cheol-soo
- Political position: Centre
- Colors: Sky Blue

Korean name
- Hangul: 새정치연합
- Hanja: 새政治聯合
- RR: Sae jeongchi yeonhap
- MR: Sae chŏngch'i yŏnhap

The New Political Vision Party (a.k.a New Politics Alliance; Korean: 새정치연합) was a political party that Ahn Cheol-soo, who was a member of the 19th National Assembly at the time, attempted to found.

Since 2011, the opposition bloc had sought to recruit Ahn Cheol-soo, who commanded broad support among voters in their 20s, 30s and 40s. However, Ahn consistently declined these offers, citing various reasons. On 17 February 2014, he launched the New Political Vision Party as an organisation to prepare the founding of a new political party. This party was being established with Ahn at the centre. Although it reached the stage of a preparatory committee, the process was halted when a decision was made to merge with the Democratic Party, to form the New Politics Alliance for Democracy (NPAD). On 25 March 2014, one day before the launch of the NPAD, the preparatory committee for the New Political Vision Party dissolved following a resolution by its central steering committee. This initiative subsequently led to the formation of the People Party.

== History ==
In November 2013, Ahn Cheol-soo established a political organisation named the "Committee for a New Politics with the People" with the goal of founding a new political party. Holding a press conference at the National Assembly, he announced that the committee's objective was to launch a new party, targeting the 2014 South Korean local elections. In the inaugural declaration, Ahn emphasised politics focused on the public's livelihood and daily life, starting, "We intend to respond to these earnest demands of the people with a politics that fosters a meaningful life." Prior to this, on 10 November, the names of the executive committee members were revealed. The regional breakdown was as follows: Seoul (113), Gyeonggi (72), Incheon (28), Daejeon (32), South Chungcheong (16), North Chungcheong (14), Gwangju-Jeonnam (80), Jeonbuk (61), Busan-Gyeongnam (41), and Jeju (9). Including the 68 executive committee members from the Honam region announced previously, a total of 534 members were named.

On 8 December, Ahn Cheol-soo announced the appointments of the steering committee's co-chairs and other officials. Independent lawmaker Song Ho-chang, a close aide to Ahn, was appointed as the committee's communications chair, while lawyer Keum Tae-sup was named spokesperson. The committee held its inaugural meeting on 9 December, during which Ahn outlined the direction for the new party to be established, stating "We must pursue a rational reformism that is unbiased and prioritises the interests of the people above all else."

On 1 January 2014, to mark the New Year, members visited gravesites of former Presidents Kim Dae-jung, Park Chung Hee and Syngman Rhee at the Seoul National Cemetery. Key figures, including Ahn Cheol-soo and Song Ho-chang, were in attendance. When the visit to Park Chung-hee's gravesite sparked controversy within some segments of the progressive reformist camp, co-chairman Kim Hyo-seok rebutted the criticism on 2 January stating, "It was an act of courtesy toward a former president," and adding, "Paying our respects does not mean we intend to emulate that figure's [Park Chung-hee's] leadership style."

On 21 January, Ahn Cheol-soo announced plans to found a new party by the end of March, and the committee selected New Political Vision Party as the provisional name.

On 16 February 2014, the party name New Political Vision Party was finalised following a public contest, and the inaugural promoters' meeting was held on the following day. At the meeting, lawmaker Ahn Cheol-soo was unanimously appointed as the legal representative and Central Steering Committee Chair of the party's preparatory committee.

For the party color, the sky blue previously used by the committee was adopted on a temporary basis.

However, on 2 March 2014, Representative Ahn Cheol-soo held a joint press conference with Democratic Party Representative Kim Han-gil and made a surprise announcement that they would found a new party in the "third zone", centred on the decision not to nominate candidates for local-level elections, which was later named the New Politics Alliance for Democracy (NPAD). Consequently, the existing process of founding the New Political Vision Party was completely suspended, and the preparatory committee for the party was officially dissolved on 25 March, just one day before NPAD was set to be launched.

Meanwhile, it was agreed that the name "New Politics Alliance" would serve as the abbreviation for the NPAD during the latter's founding process. However, because a preparatory committee for a separate "New Politics Alliance" still existed at the time the preparatory committee for the "New Politics Alliance for Democracy" was registered, it was impossible to immediately register "New Politics Alliance" as the abbreviation for the "New Politics Alliance for Democracy." Consequently, "New Politics Alliance" was registered as the abbreviation only after the preparatory committee was dissolved and the NPAD was officially founded.

== Party name ==
Concerns were raised that the term "New Politics", which Ahn Cheol-soo intended to include in his party name, was too similar to that of the "New Politics National Party" (abbreviated as the "New Politics Party"). Due to the similarity between the provisional name and the already established party, the National Election Commission of South Korea sent an official notice of caution to Ahn.

According to Ahn Cheol-soo's camp the Election Commission stated that a name containing the phrase "New Politics" was permissible. However, there are still many criticisms that the name is too similar to existing ones, potentially violating the Political Parties Act. Saenuri Party lawmaker Lee No-geun argued that "New Political Alliance" is confusingly similar to "New Politics Party", the abbreviated name of the "New Politics National Party". The National Election Commission held a review to determine whether the names are too similar. The New Politics National Party issued an initial warning to the New Politics Alliance.

There is no official abbreviation for the party. Regarding the name, spokesperson Keum Tae-sup explained that the final candidates included "New Politics Future Alliance," "New Politics Action Solidarity," "New Politics Solidarity," and "New Politics Together Party," noting, "We chose alliance over solidarity to convey a sense of stronger unity." Lawmaker Ahn Cheol-soo once jokingly remarked, "They say that if a party name includes the word new, it wins the presidential election." Indeed, parties such as the National Congress for New Politics (1995), the Millennium Democratic Party (2000), and the Saenuri Party (2012) all went on to become the ruling party.

== Leadership ==
- Chairperson of the Central Steering Committee: Ahn Cheol-soo (Independent lawmaker)
- Co-Chairpersons: Yoon Yeo-joon (Chair of the Committee for New Politics Promotion; former Minister of Environment), Park Ho-gun (President of Handok Media University; former Minister of Science and Technology), Yoon Jang-hyun (Chairman of Gwangju Vision 21), Kim Hyo-seok (former Democratic Party lawmaker), Lee Gye-an (former Democratic Party lawmaker), Kim Seong-sik (former Grand National Party lawmaker), Hong Geun-myeong (former Representative of Ulsan Citizens' Solidarity)
- Chairperson of the Communication Committee: Song Ho-chang (Independent lawmaker)
- Spokesperson: Keum Tae-sup (lawyer)
