= Let's go! Green Party =

2020–2024 political party in South Korea

- Leader: Kwon Gi-jae
- Founded: February 20, 2020
- Dissolved: April 16, 2024
- Headquarters: 726 Suseo-dong, Gangnam District, Seoul, South Korea
- Membership: 7,477
- Ideology: Ecology; Progressivism
- Political position: Centre-left to Left
- Colours: Sky blue
- National Assembly: 0 / 297
- Metropolitan Mayors and Governors: 0 / 17
- Municipal Mayors: 0 / 226
- Provincial and Metropolitan Councillors: 0 / 872

Website
- letsgogreenparty.kr (archived)

Korean name
- Hangul: 가자환경당
- Hanja: 가자環境黨
- RR: Gaja hwangyeongdang
- MR: Kaja hwan'gyŏngdang

The Let's go! Green Party (Korean: 가자환경당) was a progressive political party in South Korea that claimed to focus on environmental protection but lacked support from other environmental organisations.

The party was founded in 2020; it participated in the 2020 South Korean legislative election held that same year; however, as it did not participate in any subsequent elections, it was dissolved in 2024 in accordance with the Political Parties Act.

== Key election results ==
=== National Assembly elections ===
Year	Election	Constituency		Proportional representation		Total seats	
Year	Election	Won	Share	Won	Vote share	Won	Share
2020	21st	0/253	0%	0/47	0.03%	0/300	0%
