= New Korea Party (South Korea, 1992) =

1992-1995 South Korean Political Party

New Korea Party 새한국당
- Leader: Lee Jongchan
- Founded: October 19, 1992
- Dissolved: March 7, 1995
- Split from: Democratic Liberal Party
- Merged into: Democratic Party
- Ideology: Conservativism Liberalism Centrism
- Political position: Centre to Right-wing
- Colors: Navy

Korean name
- Hangul: 새한국당
- Hanja: 새韓國黨
- RR: Sae Hangukdang
- MR: Sae Han'guktang

The New Korea Party (Korean: 새한국당) was a political party in South Korea that existed from 1992 to 1995.

== History ==
In October 1992, Lee Jong-chan, a presidential hopeful from the Democratic Liberal Party, founded a new party alongside supporters (including Kim Hyun-wook, Park Chul-un, Lee Young-il and Jang Kyung-woo) after losing the Presidential nomination race to Kim Young-sam.

Subsequently, Lee Jong-chan was nominated as the candidate for the 1992 South Korean presidential election. However, ultimately, Lee Jong-chan himself declared his support for Unification Democratic Party candidate Chung Ju-yung on 13 December.

Subsequently, amidst a support decrease in which it failed to win a single seat in the by-elections, the party merged with the Democratic Party led by Lee Ki-taek in March 1995 and ceased to exist.
