= Social Democratic Party of Korea (South Korea, 2002) =

2002–2004 political party in South Korea

- Abbreviation: Civil Party
- Leader: Lee Nam-soon
- Founded: November 18, 2002
- Dissolved: February 22, 2004
- Merged into: Green Social Democratic Party
- Ideology: Progressivism; Social democracy
- Political position: Centre-left
- Colours: Blue

Korean name
- Hangul: 한국사회민주당
- Hanja: 社會民主黨
- RR: Hanguk sahoe minjudang
- MR: Han'guk sahoe minjudang

The Social Democratic Party of Korea (Korean: 민주사회당) was a South Korean social democratic and progressive political party that was founded on 18 November 2002, centring on the Federation of Korean Trade Unions (FKTU).

Lee Nam-soon, Chairman of the Federation of Korean Trade Unions, served as the chair of the advisory board for the party, which was originally founded under the name Democratic Socialist Party. On 27 March 2003, the party changed its name to the Social Democratic Party of Korea during its regular national convention and appointed Jang Ki-pyo, who had recently joined the party, as its leader.

The Social Democratic Party of Korea outlined its core policies as follows: realising a democratic welfare society based on social democratic ideals; harmonising labor and capital; establishing a balanced society free from privilege and discrimination; resolving the chronic economic crises, public discord, and social instability plaguing Korean society; and building a new world characterised by public welfare social peace and national advancement. Additionally, the party issued a statement criticising the 2003 US-led invasion of Iraq, describing it as a "shameful war of aggression serving the interests of the United States and capital."

On 5 February 2004, Park Chang-hwa and Jeong Hae-hun (co-representatives of the Green Peace Party), Jang Ki-pyo (representative of the Social Democratic Party of Korea) announced a merger with the Green Peace Party, aiming to "eradicate corrupt politics, overcome the economic crisis, preserve the green environment and establish social welfare." The parties merged to found the Green Social Democratic Party at the Weightlifting Gymnasium in Seoul Olympic Park on 22 February 2004.

== Logos ==
Logo of the Democratic Socialist Party

Logo of the Social Democratic Party of Korea
