= Korea Greens =

2004–2008 political party in South Korea

- Founded: June 2004
- Dissolved: July 2008
- Merged into: Green Party Korea
- Ideology: Green Politics
- International affiliation: Global Greens, Asia-Pacific Green Network

Website
- www.koreagreens.org/

- Korea Greens
- Hangul: 초록정치연대
- Hanja: 草綠政治連帶
- RR: Chorok jeongchi yeondae
- MR: Ch'orok chŏngch'i yŏndae

The Korea Greens (Korean: 초록정치연대) was a political group in South Korea. It was established on June 10, 2004, following initial discussions in 2003. They were a member of the Global Greens and the Asia-Pacific Green Network. It was dissolved on July 12, 2008.

== See also ==
- Green Party Korea
