= Yusinjeonguhoe =

1973-1980 political organisation in South Korea

- Abbreviation: Yujeonghoe
- Leader: Tae Wan-sun
- Founded: 10 March 1973
- Dissolved: 27 October 1980
- Headquarters: 457 Samil-daero, Jongno-gu, Seoul
- Ideology: Yushin Constitution; Authoritarianism; Anti-communism; Korean style democracy
- Political position: Far-right
- Colours: Yellow

Korean name
- Hangul: 유신정우회
- Hanja: 維新政友會
- RR: Yusin jeonguhoe
- MR: Yusin chŏnguhoe

The Yusinjeonguhoe (Korean: 유신정우회) was a parliamentary negotiating group and quasi-political organisation formed by members of the National Assembly representing the national constituency following the launch of the Fourth Republic of Korea under the October Yushin reforms in 1972. It was headquartered 457 Samil-daero, Jongno-gu, Seoul.

Under the Yushin Constitution, members of the National Assembly representing the national constituency, comprising one third of the total number of lawmakers, were elected through a yes or no vote on candidates nominated by the President; this process was overseen by the National Conference for Unification, the body responsible for presidential elections. Their term of office was three years, half the length of the term served by regular National Assembly members.

The 73 national constituency lawmakers elected on 10 March 1973, under the constitution via a vote by the National Conference for Unification following nomination by President Park Chung-hee, did not join the Democratic Republican Party but instead formed a separate parliamentary negotiating group. They established an organisational structure comprising a general meeting of lawmakers, a floor leadership team, and a spokesperson thereby functioning much like a political party.

It was formed on 10 March 1973, with Paik Too-chin appointed as its chairman, and underwent reorganisation in 1976 and 1979 following the election of new lawmakers for the subsequent terms. Effectively an organisation established to ensure Park Chung-hee's sole control over the legislature and serving as a satellite party to the Democratic Republican Party, the Yusinjeonguhoe ceased operations after the Assassination of Park Chung Hee on 26 October 1979 and was dissolved, along with the National Conference for Unification, upon the promulgation of the Fifth Republic Constitution in 1980.

== See also ==
- October Restoration
- Democratic Republican Party
- United Liberal Democrats
- Park Chung Hee
