= Green Party Korea =

Green Party 녹색당
- Leaders: Lee Sang-hyeon; Kim Chan-hwi
- Founded: 2 April 2012 (Green Party); 13 October 2012 (Greens Plus); 19 April 2014 (Green Party)
- Headquarters: Seoul
- Youth wing: 청년녹색당 (Youth Green Party)
- Membership (2016): 10,085
- Ideology: Green politics; Feminism (South Korean); Progressivism (South Korean); Faction: Eco-socialism
- Political position: Left-wing
- National affiliation: Green Justice Party (2024)
- Regional affiliation: Asia Pacific Greens Federation
- International affiliation: Global Greens
- Colours: Green
- National Assembly: 0 / 300
- Metropolitan mayors and governors: 0 / 16
- Municipal mayors: 0 / 227
- Provincial and metropolitan councillors: 0 / 933
- Municipal councillors: 1 / 3,034

Website
- kgreens.org

- Green Party Korea
- Hangul: 녹색당
- Hanja: 綠色黨
- RR: Noksaekdang
- MR: Noksaektang

Green Party Korea (Korean: 녹색당) is a political party in South Korea. The party was established in March 2012. It is a continuation of the Korea Greens, created following initial discussions in 2011. The party was established in response to the Fukushima nuclear crisis of Japan. Green Party Korea is a member of the Global Greens and the Asia Pacific Greens Federation.

== History ==
As a result of the party only getting 0.48% in the 19th national parliamentary election in April 2012, the party was disbanded by the National Election Administration Office. However, the paragraph 4 of article 41 and the subparagraph 3 of paragraph 1 of article 44 of the Political Parties Act, which had revoked registration of parties and banned use of the titles of the parties whose obtained numbers of votes had been less than 2% of the total number of effective votes, were ruled unconstitutional by the Constitutional Court of Korea on 28 January 2014. As a result, Green Party Korea recovered its title.

Green Party Korea, together with the Basic Income Youth Network, began a two-week tour on 6 July 2015 to discover the opinions citizens in South Korea have about basic income, and to introduce the concept of basic income to the community. The party has also adopted basic income as part of their party platform. The party joined an electoral alliance with social-democratic Justice Party to participate in 2024 South Korean legislative election. Due to South Korean electoral law, which doesn't allow electoral alliances officially, the Justice Party changed its name to the Green Justice Party, and candidates of the Green Party individually joined the Green Justice Party.

Logo of the Green-Justice Party (2024)

Since 2025, the Green Party has been working in solidarity with the Justice Party and Labor Party, creating Korea's version of a left-wing traffic light coalition. The Labor Party announced in early 2025 that they would join the alliance, forming the traffic light coalition. When the impeachment of President Yoon Suk-yeol triggered a presidential election, the three progressive parties fielded a joint candidate.

== Membership demographics ==
The party has more females than males. About 38.2% of party members are in their 40s. 24.8% of party members are 50 years of age or older.

== Leadership ==
1. Lee Hyun-joo and Ha Seung-soo (co-serving; 2012–2014)
2. Lee You-jin and Ha Seung-soo (co-serving; 2014–2016)
3. Kim Ju-on and Choi Hyeok-bong (co-serving; 2016–2018)
4. Ha Seung-soo and Shin Ji-ye (co-serving; 2018–2020)
5. Sung Mi-sun (2020–2021)
6. Kim Ye-won and Lee Jae-hyeok (co-serving; 2021)
7. Kim Ye-won and Kim Chan-hwi (co-serving; 2021–2023)
8. Kim Chan-hwi (2023–2024)
9. Kim Soon-ae and Lee Chi-seon (co-serving; 2024–2025)
10. Lee Sang-hyeon and Kim Chan-hwi (co-serving; 2025–present)

== Election results ==
=== Legislature ===
Election	Leader	Constituency				Party list				Seats		Position	Status
Election	Leader	Votes	%	Seats	+/-	Votes	%	Seats	+/-	No.	+/–	Position	Status
2012	Lee Hyeon-ju; Ha Seung-soo	4,843	0.02	0 / 300	new	103,842	0.48	0 / 300	new	0 / 300	new	10th	Extra-parliamentary
2016	Lee Yoo-jin; Ha Seung-soo	31,491	0.13	0 / 300	Steady	182,301	0.77	0 / 300	Steady	0 / 300	Steady	7th	Extra-parliamentary
2020	Seong Mi-seon					58,948	0.21	0 / 300	Steady	0 / 300	Steady	17th	Extra-parliamentary
2024	Charnie Kim with Justice Party	107,029	0.37	0 / 300	Steady	609,313	2.15	0 / 300	Steady	0 / 300	Steady	6th	Extra-parliamentary

=== Local ===
Election	Candidate	Votes	%
Seoul, 2018	Shin Ji-ye	82,874	1.67
Jeju, 2018	Ko Eun-young	12,188	3.53
Jeju, 2022	Bu Soon-jeong	5,750	1.94

== Logos ==
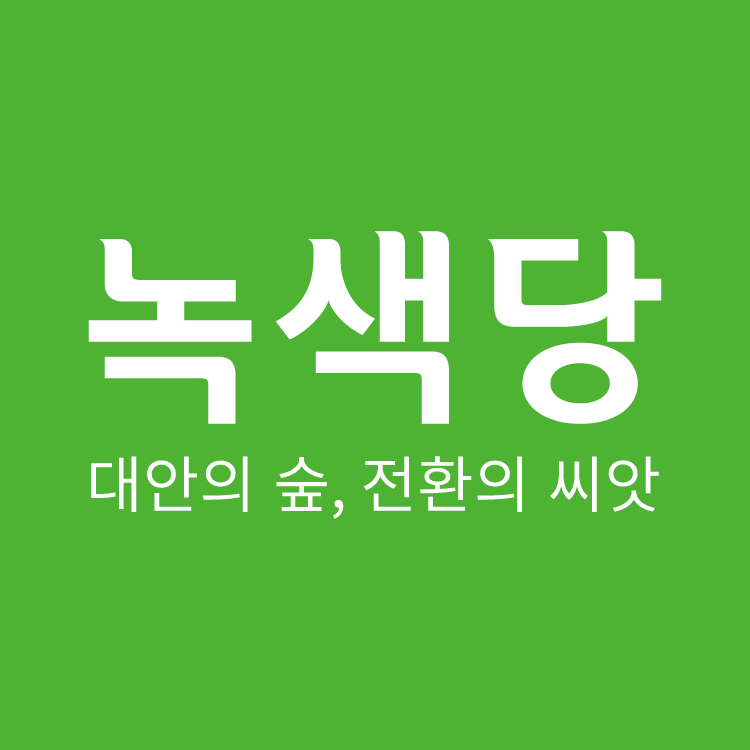

== See also ==
- Air pollution in South Korea
- Energy in South Korea
- Environment of South Korea
- List of environmental organizations
- Pollution in Korea
