= Mirae Party =

Future Party 미래당
- Leader: Oh Tae-yang
- Secretary-General: Park Jun-sung
- Founded: March 20, 2017
- Preceded by: Youth Party
- Ideology: Progressivism; Youth politics Grassroots democracy
- Colours: Indigo
- Seats in the National Assembly: 0 / 300
- Metropolitan mayors and governors: 0 / 16
- Municipal Mayors: 0 / 227
- Seats within local government: 0 / 3,034

Website
- https://makeourfuture.kr/

The Mirae Party (Korean: 미래당; Hanja: 未來黨; RR: Miraedang; lit. 'Future Party') is a youth-oriented political party centered on the rising generation of South Korea. They criticize the nation's major political parties for not properly representing the voices of young people, citing youth politics as their main ideology.

The party initially used the name Our Future (Korean: 우리미래; Hanja: 우리未來; RR: Urimirae), but changed it to its current name on 17 February 2020.

== Political orientation ==
Logo of Our Future

The party is putting forward "living politics" for women and young people and calling for active improvement in the educational and labor environment of young people, as well as ensuring the youth's "right to play". The party also calls for granting voting rights from the age of 16, and passive suffrage from the age of 20. In addition, Mirae Party is active in promoting LGBT rights.

== External political exchanges ==
Our Future has exchanged with Taiwan's New Power Party on various political issues, including youth issues.

== See also ==
- Age of candidacy
- Voting age
- Youth activism
- Youth empowerment
- Youth suffrage
- Youth voice
