= National Election Commission (South Korea) =

Election commission of South Korea

- 중앙선거관리위원회
- Emblem of NEC

- Official logo of NEC

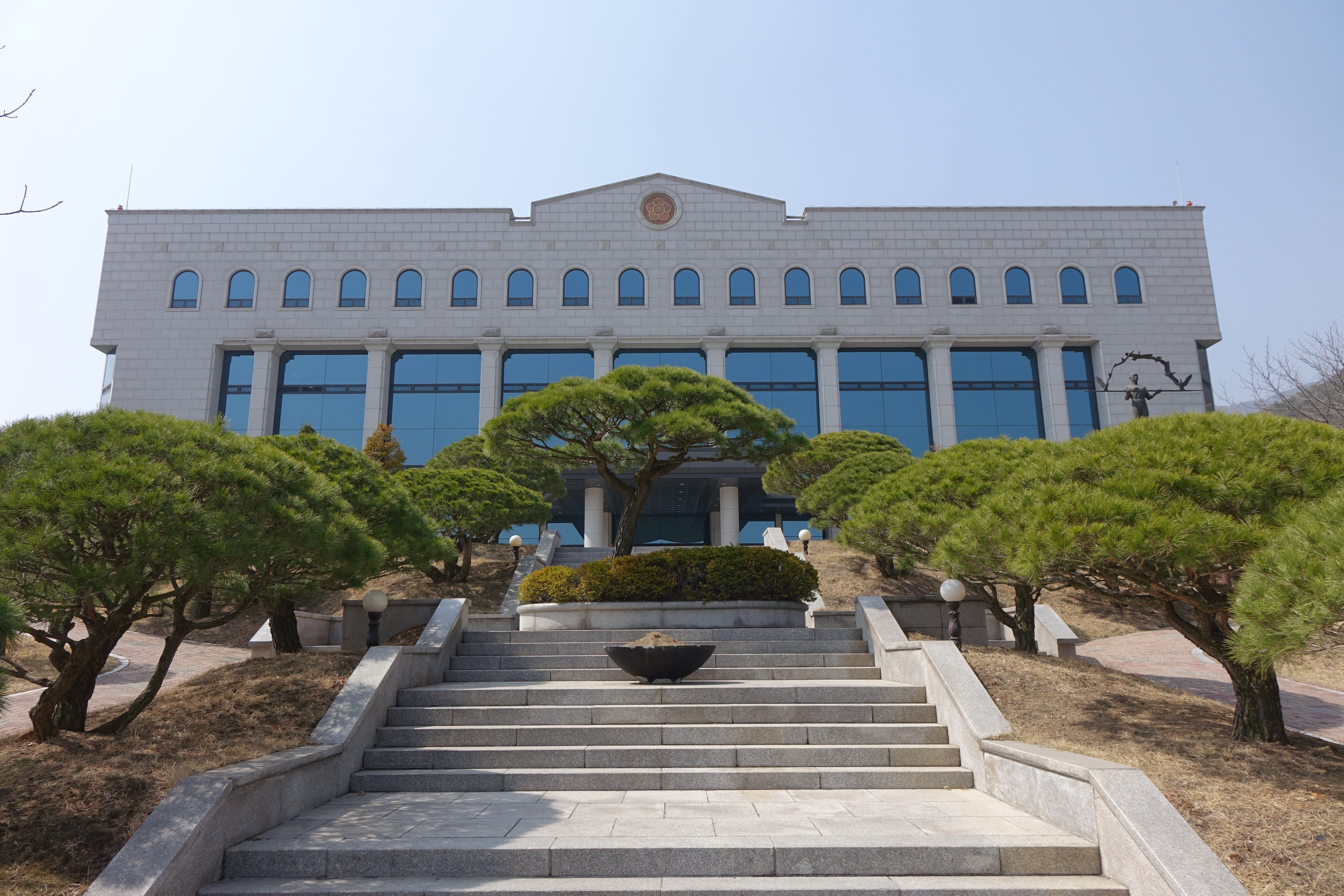
- NEC headquarters in Gwacheon

Agency overview
- Formed: 21 January 1963
- Jurisdiction: Republic of Korea
- Headquarters: Gwacheon-si, Gyeonggi-do
- Agency executive: Vacant, Chairperson
- Website: nec.go.kr

Korean name
- Hangul: 중앙선거관리위원회
- Hanja: 中央選擧管理委員會
- RR: Jungang seongeo gwalli wiwonhoe
- MR: Chungang sŏn'gŏ kwalli wiwŏnhoe

The National Election Commission (NEC; Korean: 중앙선거관리위원회) is an independent constitutional institution in South Korea, established to manage free and fair elections, national referendums and other administrative affairs concerning political parties and funds. The agency was established in accordance with Article 114 of the Constitution of South Korea. The NEC has equal status as highest constitutional institution as National Assembly, the Executive Ministries, the Supreme Court and the Constitutional Court. This highly independent status of NEC reflects national will to overcome past histories such as election rigging of South Korea in 1960.

During the period of the 2024 South Korean martial law, troops were sent to raid the commission headquarters.

== Organization ==
The Election Commission (NEC) has a four-stage organizational structure, consisting of the National Election Commission, 17 Si(metropolitan city)/Do(province) Election Commissions, 250 Gu(district or ward)/Si(city)/Gun(county) Election Commissions and 3,481 Eup/Myeon/Dong(township) Election Commissions.

The term of office of the members of the commission shall be six years. No member of the commission shall be expelled from office except by impeachment or a sentence of imprisonment without prison labor or heavier punishment. The members of the commission shall not join political parties, nor shall they participate in political activities.

Overseas Election Commission shall be operated for Korean citizens overseas where embassies and consulate-generals located, 180 days before and until 30 days after each presidential election and the National Assembly elections conducted following the termination of office.

1. National Election Commission

Composition
The National Election Commission is an independent constitutional agency composed of 9 members. 3 members are appointed by the President, 3 elected by the National Assembly, and 3 nominated by the Chief Justice of the Supreme Court. The chairperson and the vice-chairperson are elected from among the commissioners and as the custom, the Justice of the Supreme Court is elected as the chairperson. The vice-chairperson of State Minister level is a full-time position unlike the chairperson and supports the chairperson as well as oversees the Secretariat as directed by the chairperson. The 6-year term of office is guaranteed by the constitution.
The Secretariat, the Internet Election News Deliberation Commission, and the Election Debate Broadcasting Commission are the NEC’s affiliated institutions.

Secretariat
The Secretariat is composed of the Secretary-General of State Minister level and the Deputy Secretary-General of Vice Minister level in addition to two offices, twenty-five divisions and one training institute.

2. Si/Do Election Commission

Composition
Si/Do Election Commissions are composed of the chairperson, the vice-chairperson and commissioners. Each political party that has a negotiating group in the National Assembly recommends one person (who has a voting right and is not a member of any political party) as a commissioner. Three members including two judges are recommended by the Chief Justice of a Local District Court and another three members are nominated from a pool of scholars and individuals known for high academic and ethical standards. The chairperson of the commission is elected from among the members and customarily the Chief Justice of a District Court is elected the chairperson. The vice-chairperson is nominated by the National Election Commission and serves full-time. Under each Si/Do Election Commission are a secretariat and the Election Broadcasting Debates Commission.

Secretariat
The Secretariat consists of the vice-chairperson, the secretary-general and four divisions.

3. Gu/Si/Gun Election Commission

Composition
Gu/Si/Gun Election Commissions are composed of the chairperson, the deputy chairperson, and commissioners. Each Gu/Si/Gun Election Commission currently has two members endorsed by the political parties having a negotiation body in the National Assembly and six members commissioned by the Si/Do Election Commission from among judges, educators, or persons are known for their high academic and ethical standards.
The chairperson and the deputy chairperson are elected from among the commissioners and as the custom, the Judge is elected as the chairperson. No commissioner holds a full-time position. The Gu/Si/Gun Election Commission has the Secretariat and the Election Debate Broadcasting Commission within the organization.

Secretariat
The Gu/Si/Gun Election Commission that manages the National Assembly constituencies has an Executive Bureau, otherwise, an Executive Division within the organization. An Executive Bureau/Executive Division consists of the fourth grade (fifth grade) Director General of Secretariat and two divisions.

4. Eup/Myeon/Dong Election Commissions

Composition
Eup/Myeon/Dong Election Commissions are composed of the chairperson, the vice-chairperson and commissioners.
Political parties that can constitute a negotiation body in the National Assembly endorse two members among those who reside in the Eup/Myeon/Dong and have the right to vote for members of the National Assembly but who are not members of any political party. The Gu/Si/Gun Election Commission appoints four members among the persons of learning and high moral repute. The chairperson and the vice-chairperson are elected from among the commissioners. No commissioner holds a full-time position.

Executive Organs
The Eup/Myeon/Dong Election Commission elects secretaries and clerks among local government officials to provide administrative support to the Election Commission. In addition, returning officers selected from among public officials or faculties are assigned to constituencies, where they are required to manage administrative duties pertaining to voting.

== Current commissioners of NEC ==
The current members of the NEC are:

- Rho Tae-ak, chairperson
- Kim Pil-gon, vice chairperson

(The vice chairperson is the only full-time position within the commission, who oversees the Commission Secretariat.)

- Kim Chang-bo, commissioner
- Lee Seung-taek, commissioner
- Chung Eun-sook, commissioner
- Cho Byoung-hyun, commissioner
- Cho Seong-dae, commissioner
- Park Soon-young, commissioner
- Nam Rae-jin, commissioner

== Duties and responsibilities ==
The National Election Commission manages elections for public office, including elections for President, National Assembly members, local council members and heads of the local government. The commission also manages entrusted elections for heads of the Agricultural, Fisheries, Livestock and Forestry Cooperatives and for candidates of presidents of National Universities.

The commission administers the registration, change, performance and dismissal of political parties and supports their activities on the basis of the constitution and the Political Parties Act, provides national subsidies for political parties, oversees the establishment and performance of supporters associations, collects and distributes political funds and monitors how the political funds are spent to guarantee smooth fundraising and transparency according to the Political Funds Act.

Manage elections for public offices
The Election Commission (EC) manages the presidential election and elections for National Assembly Members, Local Council Members and heads of the local government as prescribed by the ‘Public Official Election Act'.
Election management includes registering preliminary candidates during a certain time period before the election, making and overseeing an electoral register, registering candidates, managing election campaign as well as voting and counting to finally determine elected candidates.

Prevent, oversee and control election law violations
The EC strictly oversees and controls activities that do damage to fairness in election as well as takes preventive actions against election law violations to ensure an equal opportunity for political parties and candidates and to hold elections in a fair way while the election processes are complied with.

Investigate into the incomes and expenses of election-related funds
The EC verifies and investigates information on incomes and expenses of election-related funds reported by parties and candidates. In case of any violation such as providing false information, the EC brings a formal charge or requests an investigation against the violations.

Manage entrusted elections
The EC manages elections for the head of the Agricultural, Fisheries, Livestock and Forestry Cooperatives and the president of national universities to realize fair elections under the Election Commission Act and other relevant laws and regulations. The process of those entrusted elections is similar in nature to that of the elections for public offices.

Manage national referendums
The EC conducts and manages referendums based on the constitution to hear public opinions on important policies that affect national security such as foreign policy, national defense, unification and revision of the constitution.

Manage residents' referendums
The EC manages residents' referendums to determine important matters which will be formulated into ordinances of local governments and which also relate to national policies and impose a heavy burden on or affect the public. The process of residents' referendums is similar to that of referendums.

Manage residents' recall votes
The EC manages residents' recall votes through which the public decide to remove a head of local government or a local council member from his/her office before his/her office term is terminated in such cases as parliamentary democracy is damaged due to the elected head of local government or local council member violating the law, performing wrongdoings or neglecting his/her duty.

Manage political party duties
The EC administers the registration, change, performance and dismissal of political parties and supports their activities on the basis of the constitution and the Political Parties Act to guarantee freedom of forming a political party and of doing political activities so that the parties will be developed into ‘Policy-oriented’ parties.

Manage affairs in relation to political funds
The National Election Commission provides national subsidies for political parties, oversees the establishment and performance of supporters associations, collects and distributes political funds and monitors how the political funds are spent to guarantee smooth fundraising and transparency according to the Political Funds Act.

== 2026 South Korean local election ballot shortage incident ==
The 2026 South Korean local election ballot shortage incident refers to a ballot shortage that occurred during the 2026 South Korean local elections on June 3, 2026, preventing some voters from casting their ballots and causing voting to be temporarily suspended at several polling stations. Among approximately 14,300 polling stations nationwide, ballots were exhausted at 140 polling stations, including those in the Seoul districts of Songpa, Seocho, Gangnam, Gwangjin, and Dongjak. At 26 of those polling stations, replacement ballots were not delivered in time, resulting in the temporary suspension of voting.

The incident sparked public controversy. Some voters and participants in subsequent demonstrations called for an investigation into alleged infringement of voting rights and allegation of election fraud, accountability measure against the Nation Election Commission, disciplinary action against responsible officials, the dissolution of the Commission, and a rerun of the local elections. On June 5, 2026, NEC Chair Rho Tae-ak announced his resignation. Demonstrations began on the evening of June 3 in Jamil 7-dong, Songpa District, Seoul, followed by protests outside the NEC headquarters on June 4. On June 5, the 2026 South Korean local election rerun protests began at Olympic Park in Seoul, calling for the local elections to be rerun.

On June 9, 2026, the government established a joint investigation team composed of the police and prosecutors to investigate the incident and the National Election Commissions.

== Symbols ==
Emblem used until 2018

Flag used until 2018

Emblem from 2018

Flag from 2018

Logo used between 2000–2013
