= Chung Woon-chun =

South Korean businessman and politician (born 1954)

The Honourable Chung Woon-chun MP
- 정운천

President of the New Conservative Party
- In office 5 January 2020 – 14 February 2020; Serving with: Ha Tae-keung; Oh Shin-hwan; Yoo Ui-dong; Ji Sang-wook
- Preceded by: Position established
- Succeeded by: Position abolished

Member of the National Assembly
- In office 30 May 2020 – 29 May 2024
- Constituency: Proportional (16th)
- In office 30 May 2016 – 29 May 2020
- Preceded by: Lee Sang-jik (as Jeonju Wansan B, North Jeolla)
- Succeeded by: Lee Sang-jik
- Constituency: Jeonju B (North Jeolla)

Minister of Agriculture, Fishery, and Food
- In office 29 February 2008 – 6 August 2008
- Preceded by: Lim Sang-kyu (as the Minister of Agriculture)
- Succeeded by: Chang Tae-pyung

Personal details
- Born: 10 April 1954 (age 72) Gochang, North Jeolla, South Korea
- Party: PPP
- Other political affiliations: GNP (2010–2012); Saenuri (2012–2016); Bareun (2017–2018); Bareunmirae (2018–2020); NCP (2020); FKP (2020); UFP (2020)
- Spouse: Choi Kyung-sun
- Children: Chung Yong-hoon; Chung Da-eun
- Education: Korea University
- Occupation: Farmer, businessman, politician

Chung Woon-chun (Korean: 정운천, born 10 April 1954) is a South Korean farmer, businessman and politician who served as one of co-Presidents of the defunct New Conservative Party. He was also a Member of National Assembly for Jeonju 2nd constituency from 2016 to 2020. He was one of rare conservative MPs in Honam. Prior to his MP career, he briefly served as the Minister of Agriculture, Fishery, and Food under the President Lee Myung-bak.

== Career ==
Born in Gochang, Chung moved to Iksan and attended to Namsung High School. After he earned a bachelor's degree in agricultural economics from Korea University, he built polytunnels in Haenam to cultivate New Zealand kiwis. He named the kiwis as Chamdarae, and the business was successful, despite several crises — Typhoon Thelma in 1987, market liberalisation in 1989, and warehouse fire in 1999. This career gave him a nickname, "Lee Kun-hee of agricultural industry". Though his success was later even mentioned in several textbooks, a former Democratic Labour MP Kang Ki-kap criticised that Chung's business was operated with government grants.

== Political career ==
In 2005, Chung shortly worked under the President Roh Moo-hyun. Shortly after Lee Myung-bak was elected as the new President, Chung was appointed as the Minister of Agriculture, Fishery, and Food. He took a key role of the US beef imports, which sparked several controversies. 3 opposition parties — the United Democratic Party (UDP), the Democratic Labour Party (DLP), and the Party for Freedom and Advancement (PFA), suggested a motion of no-confidence against him. He barely survived, but shortly after a nationwide protest was sparked, in which led him to be sacked from the position.

Following his dismissal, Chung wrote a book Tangy (撲鼻香, named after a poem of Huangbo Xiyun) which talks about a hardship during his ministership. Then, he was invited to the ruling Grand National Party (GNP) prior to the 2010 local elections. He unsuccessfully ran as the Governor of North Jeolla, but gained 18.2%, which became a sensation in South Korean society.

In the 2012 election, Chung was nominated as the Saenuri MP candidate for Jeonju Wansan 2nd constituency (the "Wansan" was removed from its name in 2016). He led in several opinion polls in which focused by some media, but in the end he received 35.8% and lost to the DUP's Lee Sang-jik.

Chung was selected again as the Saenuri candidate for Wansan 2nd constituency in the 2016 election. He faced Choi Hyung-jae, the Democratic candidate who lost to Lee Sang-jik in DUP preselection in 2012. He narrowly beat Lee with a majority of 111 votes, made him to be the 2nd conservative MP of Jeonju after Kang Hyun-wook who was elected under New Korea Party (predecessor of the Saenuri Party) banner in 1996. Along with Lee Jung-hyun, he was the only two MPs elected in Honam.

On 26 December 2016, shortly after the political scandal, Chung resigned from the Saenuri Party (Liberty Korea Party since February 2017), along with the party's dissidents, citing that he is no more able to represent people under the Saenuri banner. He then became a founding member of the Bareun Party, however, on 2 May 2017, sources reported that he was considering about either returning to the Liberty Korea Party or being as an independent. Two days later, he decided to remain as a Bareun MP.

On 14 June 2017, Chung announced his bid for the party presidency. On 26 June, he received 17.6% and came behind to Lee Hye-hoon and Ha Tae-keung (only Kim Young-woo was behind of Chung), in which elected Lee as the President while the others as Vice Presidents. Following the resignation of Lee, he launched his another bid for the snap leadership election, but also came to 3rd and lost to Yoo Seong-min, and therefore remained as a Vice President.

After the Bareun Party was merged into the Bareunmirae Party, Chung announced his another bid for the party presidency. On 2 September, he came to forth and failed to be elected as neither the President nor Vice Presidents.

On 3 January 2020, Chung quit from the Bareunmirae Party along with the other dissidents. Two days later, he was elected as the co-Presidents of the newly-formed New Conservative Party, along with Ha Tae-keung, Oh Shin-hwan, Yoo Ui-dong, and Ji Sang-wook. On 14 February, he joined the Future Korea Party (FKP).

== Personal life ==
Chung married to Choi Kyung-sun, a retired school teacher in Seoul. Both has a son (Chung Yong-hoon) and a daughter (Chung Da-eun). His mother died in 1996.

== Election results ==
=== General elections ===
Year	Elections	Constituency	Political party	Votes (%)	Remarks
2012	19th National Assembly General Election	Jeonju Wansan B (North Jeolla)	Saenuri	30,406 (35.79%)	Defeated (2nd)
2016	20th National Assembly General Election	Jeonju B (North Jeolla)	Saenuri	40,982 (37.53%)	Won
2020	21st National Assembly General Election	PR (16th)	FKP	9,441,520 (33.84%)	Elected
2024	22nd National Assembly General Election	Jeonju B (North Jeolla)	PPP	23,014 (20.63%)	Defeated (2nd)

=== Local elections ===
==== Governor of North Jeolla ====
Year	Elections	constituency	Political party	Votes (%)	Remarks
2010	5th Iocal Election	North Jeolla (Governoral Elections)	GNP	151,064 (18.20%)	Defeated (2nd)
