= Oh Shin-hwan =

South Korean actor and politician

The Honourable Oh Shin-hwan
- 오신환
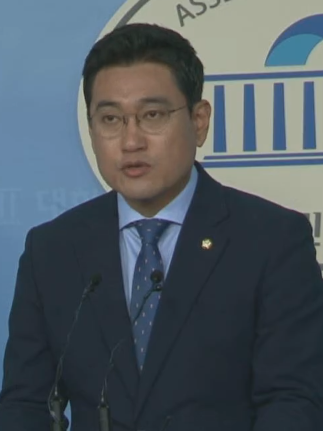
- Oh in 2019 National Assembly press conference

President of the New Conservative Party
- In office Serving with: Ha Tae-keung; Yu Eui-dong; Chung Woon-chun; Ji Sang-wook; 5 January 2020 – 17 February 2020
- Preceded by: Position established
- Succeeded by: Position abolished

Member of the National Assembly
- In office 30 April 2015 – 29 May 2020
- Preceded by: Lee Sang-kyu
- Succeeded by: Jung Tae-ho
- Constituency: Gwanak B (Seoul)

Personal details
- Born: 7 February 1971 (age 55) Sillim-dong, Yeongdeungpo District, Seoul, South Korea
- Party: People Power
- Other political affiliations: GNP (2006–2012); Saenuri (2012–2016); Bareun (2017–2018); Bareunmirae (2018–2020); NCP (2020)
- Spouse: Yoo Jung-mi
- Children: Oh Se-yoon; Oh Se-hyun
- Education: Korea National University of Arts
- Occupation: Actor; politician

Oh Shin-hwan (Korean: 오신환, born 7 February 1971) is a South Korean former actor and conservative politician. Starting his career as an obscure actor in 1990s, he was elected as a Member of National Assembly for Gwanak B constituency at the 2015 by-election, making him as the first conservative MP of the liberal-leaning constituency since its creation in 1988.

== Early life and education ==
Oh was born in Sillim-dong, Yeongdeungpo District (now in Gwanak District) in Seoul in 1971. He is the youngest son of Lee Sung-im and Oh Yoo-geun, the former Deputy Speaker of the Seoul Metropolitan Council.

He attended to Danggok Primary School and Danggok Secondary School, then graduated from Danggok High School in 1989. Following the graduation, he studied civil engineering at Konkuk University but dropped out. He was then admitted to Korea National University of Arts (K-ARTS) and earned a bachelor's degree in theatre, as well as a master's degree in public policy from Korea University and a doctorate in urban sociology from University of Seoul. He graduated from K-ARTS in 1998 along with several notable actors, such as Jang Dong-gun and Lee Sun-kyun.

== Acting career ==
Oh had been acting in some university plays since 1989, while he was studying at Konkuk University. He joined Yeonwoo Stage in 1991, then subsequently appeared to Ride Together (동승), which was adapted from a drama of Ham Se-dŏk. After his admission to K-ARTS in 1994, he continued his acting in Marionette Show (꼭두각시 놀음), The Story of Park Ki-hong (박기홍 이야기), Mud (진흙) and so on. During this period, he worked with Song Kang-ho; a source reported that both used to share a house. Other than plays, Oh played supporting roles in independent films, including Yellow Flower (둘 하나 섹스) and A Woman Off Her Uniform (남산에 오르다).

Before admitting to politics, Oh served as the director of Seoul Foundation for Arts and Culture.

== Political career ==
Oh joined the Grand National Party (GNP; later Saenuri Party then Liberty Korea Party) in 2006, and ran as a Seoul Metropolitan Council member for Gwanak 1st constituency at the local elections. He received 43.75% and won, making him as the youngest person holds the position. In 2010, he was chosen as the GNP candidate for Mayor of Gwanak but lost to Yoo Jong-pil. In 2012, he was the Saenuri's MP candidate for Gwanak 2nd constituency but defeated by the opposition alliance (DUP-UPP) candidate Lee Sang-kyu. Following the defeat, he worked for Park Geun-hye, the Saenuri's presidential candidate who won in the same year, as well as the party's youth wing.

The election of Lee Sang-kyu was annulled due to the UPP's ban in December 2014, which brought a by-election in 2015. Oh won the Saenuri preselection, defeating the former candidate Kim Cheol-soo. On 29 April, he gained 43.89% and defeated Chung Tae-ho (NPAD) and Chung Dong-young (Independent). The result became a sensation, as the constituency was known as liberal-leaning where conservatives did not win since the creation in 1988. Nevertheless, some analyses showed that he could lose if non-conservatives put a unity candidate.

Oh was re-elected in 2016, where his party faced a shock defeat. He was then appointed as the party's deputy parliamentary leader, but left the party after the political scandal in October. He then joined Bareun Party, the splinter group formed by Saenuri's dissidents. On 22 December 2017, he was elected as the party's parliamentary leader and held the position till the party was merged into Bareunmirae Party in 2018.

After Sohn Hak-kyu was elected as the Bareunmirae's President, Oh was appointed as the Secretary-General. Soon, the party was split due to the conflicts regarding the electoral reform and the installation of the Office of Crime Investigation for Senior Public Officials. This occurred the resignation of Kim Kwan-young, the party's parliamentary leader who faced public criticisms. Oh succeeded the position on 15 May, defeating Kim Sung-sick. Analyses showed that Kim failed to get supports from the former People's Party (PP) MPs, though Kim has a background of PP.

Following the long conflicts with Sohn, Oh joined the party's dissident group, Emergency Action for Change and Innovation (later New Conservative Party), led by the party's ex-co-President Yoo Seong-min. However, Yoo stood down as the group leader due to the controversy, made Oh to replace the presidency. All group members were later suspended from the party, as well as Oh, who was also sacked from the parliamentary leader.

In 2023, under mayor Oh Se-hoon, Oh was appointed Seoul's Deputy Mayor for Political Affairs. He later resigned on 16 May, to prepare for the upcoming National Assembly elections in 2024.

== Controversy ==
During the 2015 by-election, it was reported that Oh's master's degree from Korea University was revoked due to the thesis plagiarism, which he forgot to write the references. He mentioned that his degree was not revoked; he voluntarily returned it for parliamentary career.

== Personal life ==
Oh married to Yoo Jung-mi and has 2 sons — Oh Se-yoon and Oh Se-hyun. He is a Protestant.

== Filmography ==
=== Theatre ===
- Ride Together (1991)
- Marionette Show
- The Story of Park Ki-hong
- Mud
- Kiss (1998)

=== Film ===
- Yellow Flower (1998)
- A Woman Off Her Uniform (2001)

=== Entertainment ===
- Children, The Life's Greatest Blessing (2015)

== Election results ==
=== General elections ===
Year	Elections	Constituency	Political party	Votes (%)	Remarks
2012	19th National Assembly General Election	Gwanak B (Seoul)	Saenuri	37,559 (33.28%)	Defeated
2015	2015 By-election	Gwanak B (Seoul)	Saenuri	33,913 (43.89%)	Won
2016	20th National Assembly General Election	Gwanak B (Seoul)	Saenuri	45,454 (37.05%)	Won
2020	21st National Assembly General Election	Gwanak B (Seoul)	UFP	56,130 (41.71%)	Defeated
2024	22nd National Assembly General Election	Gwangjin B (Seoul)	PPP	49,347 (47.60%)	Defeated

=== Local elections ===
==== Seoul Metropolitan Council ====
Year	Elections	Constituency	Political party	Votes (%)	Remarks
2006	4th Iocal Election	Seoul Gwanak 1st	GNP	21,656 (43.75%)	Won

==== Mayor of Seoul Gwanak ====
Year	Elections	Constituency	Political party	Votes (%)	Remarks
2010	5th Iocal Election	Mayor of Seoul Gwanak	GNP	82,899 (35.29%)	Defeated
