= Yu Eui-dong =

South Korean politician (born 1971)

The Honourable Yu Eui-dong MP
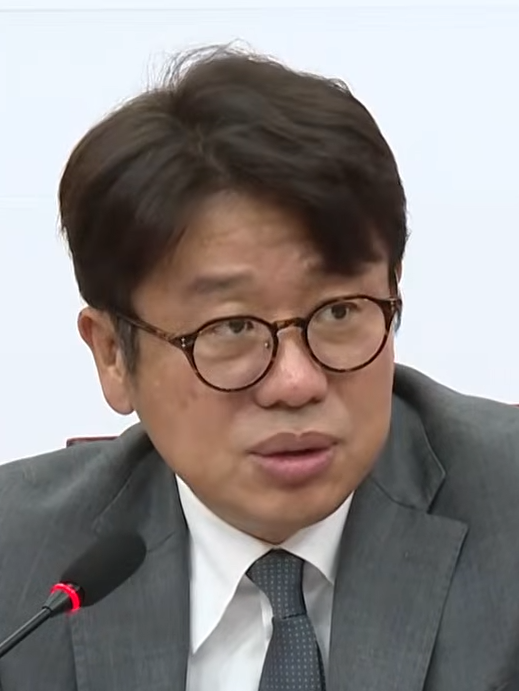
- Yu in 2026

Chair of the People Power Party Policy Planning Committee
- In office 16 October 2023 – 11 April 2024
- Preceded by: Park Dae-chul
- Succeeded by: Sung Il-jong

President of the New Conservative Party
- In office 5 January 2020 – 17 February 2020; Serving with: Ha Tae-keung; Oh Shin-hwan; Chung Woon-chun; Ji Sang-wook
- Preceded by: Position established
- Succeeded by: Position abolished

Member of the National Assembly
- In office 31 July 2014 – 29 May 2024
- Preceded by: Lee Jae-young
- Succeeded by: Lee Byung-jin (Pyeongtaek B, Gyeonggi); Kim Hyun-jung (Pyeongtaek C, Gyeonggi)
- Constituency: Pyeongtaek B (Gyeonggi)
- Incumbent
- Assumed office 4 June 2026
- Preceded by: Lee Byung-jin
- Constituency: Pyeongtaek B (Gyeonggi)

Personal details
- Born: 23 June 1971 (age 55) Pyeongtaek Gyeonggi, South Korea
- Party: People Power
- Other political affiliations: Saenuri (2012–2016); Independent (2016–2017, 2020); Bareun (2017–2018); Bareunmirae (2018–2020); NCP (2020); UFP (2020)
- Spouse: Kim Yoon-jung
- Education: Hankuk University of Foreign Studies; University of California, San Diego
- Occupation: Politician
- Religion: Roman Catholic (Christian name: Andrew Kim Taegon)

Korean name
- Hangul: 유의동
- RR: Yu Uidong
- MR: Yu Ŭidong

Yu Eui-dong (Korean: 유의동, born 23 June 1971) is a South Korean conservative politician who is a Member of National Assembly for the Gyeonggi Pyeongtaek B constituency from 2014 and 2024, since 2026.

== Early career ==
Prior to his political career, Yu studied Thai language at Hankuk University of Foreign Studies. He holds a master's degree in international relations from University of California, San Diego. Following the graduation, he worked as a secretary for the ex-Prime Minister Lee Han-dong, as well as an aide for a former MP Ryu Ji-young.

== Political career ==
Yu was elected as the MP for Pyeongtaek 2nd constituency at the 2014 by-election, after the election of Lee Jae-young was nullified. He gained 52.05% and defeated Chung Jang-sun of New Politics Alliance for Democracy.

Few months after his re-election in 2016, he left Saenuri Party (then Liberty Korea Party) and joined Bareun Party. When Yoo Seong-min was elected as the party's president in November 2017, Yu was appointed as the chief spokesperson and served till the party was merged into Bareunmirae Party.

On 18 May 2017, 10 Bareun and Liberty Korea MPs including Yu proposed an amendment, which prohibits governmental researchers to be involved in politics, in order to reinforce political neutrality. The proposed amendment includes the prohibition of endorsing any political party or its candidates.

On 15 July 2019, Yu and Paek Seung-joo, Liberty Korea MP for Gumi 1st constituency, submitted a motion to the National Assembly to dismiss the Minister of National Defence, Jeong Kyeong-doo.

On 1 December, Yu's Bareunmirae membership was suspended, as a member of the dissident group, Emergency Action for Change and Innovation. The group, later renamed as New Conservative Party, became a new political party, but was soon merged into the United Future Party (UFP; now People Power Party).

== Election results ==
Year	Elections	Constituency	Political party	Votes (%)	Results
2014	2014 By-election	Pyeongtaek B (Gyeonggi)	Saenuri	31,230 (52.05%)	Won
2016	20th National Assembly General Election	Pyeongtaek B (Gyeonggi)	Saenuri	45,365 (40.54%)	Won
2020	21st National Assembly General Election	Pyeongtaek B (Gyeonggi)	UFP	59,491 (47.67%)	Won
2024	22nd National Assembly General Election	Pyeongtaek C (Gyeonggi)	PPP	45,977 (43.48%)	Defeated (2nd)
2026	2026 By-election	Pyeongtaek B (Gyeonggi)	PPP	33,536 (34.83%)	Won

== Personal life ==
Yu is a son of Yu Kwang, a former Gyeonggi Provincial Assembly member who died in 2017.
