= Ji Sang-wook =

South Korean academic and politician

- 지상욱
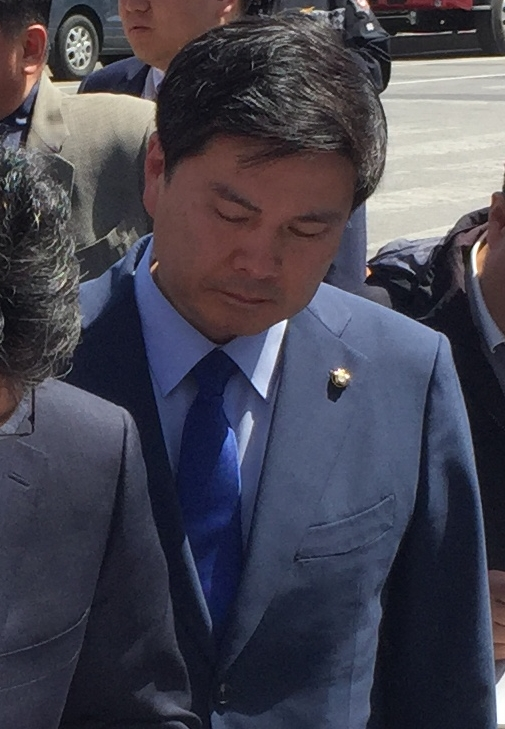

President of the New Conservative Party
- In office 5 January 2020 – 17 February 2020 Serving with Ha Tae-keung; Oh Shin-hwan; Yu Eui-dong; Chung Woon-chun
- Preceded by: Position established
- Succeeded by: Position abolished

Member of the National Assembly
- In office 30 May 2016 – 29 May 2024
- Preceded by: Chung Ho-jun (Jung, Seoul); Choi Jae-cheon (Seongdong A, Seoul)
- Succeeded by: Park Sung-joon
- Constituency: Seoul Jung–Seongdong B

Personal details
- Born: 16 May 1965 (age 61) Seoul, South Korea
- Party: People Power
- Other political affiliations: New Conservative Party (2020)
- Education: Yonsei University; Stanford University; University of Tokyo

- Ji Sang-wook
- Hangul: 지상욱
- Hanja: 池尙昱
- RR: Ji Sanguk
- MR: Chi Sanguk

Ji Sang-wook (Korean: 지상욱; born 16 May 1965) is a South Korean academic and politician in the conservative Bareun Party. He is currently a member of the National Assembly for Jung District and Seongdong District, Seoul, and was previously head of the party's district organization in Jung-gu.

Before joining the Saenuri Party, Ji was formerly a spokesman for the Liberty Forward Party, and ran as that party's candidate for Mayor of Seoul in 2010. He was nominated again for the post in 2011 but withdrew before the election took place.

Prior to his entry into politics, Ji was a professor at Yonsei University's Graduate School of International Studies. He studied civil engineering as an undergraduate at Yonsei before earning a masters at Stanford University and a doctorate from the University of Tokyo. He met LFP chairman Lee Hoi-chang in the United States after Lee's defeat in the 2002 presidential election, and subsequently served as a close aide to him.

Ji is married to the actress Shim Eun-ha, who has supported him in elections.

== Election results ==
=== General elections ===
Year	Elections	Constituency	Political party	Votes (%)	Results
2016	20th National Assembly General Election	Jung–Seongdong B (Seoul)	Saenuri	37,981 (38.03%)	Won
2020	21st National Assembly General Election	Jung–Seongdong B (Seoul)	UFP	58,300 (47.27%)	Defeated (2nd)

=== Local elections ===
==== Mayor of Seoul ====
Year	Elections	Constituency	Political party	Votes (%)	Remarks
2010	5th Iocal Election	Seoul (Mayoral Elections)	LFP	90,032 (2.04%)	Defeated (4th)

== Works ==
- 2011: Good Society 굿 소사이어티 (in Korean). Yeji. ISBN 9788989797777.
