= Opinion polling for the 2017 South Korean presidential election =

This article is a list of opinion polls taken for the 2017 South Korean presidential election. It is divided into polls for intended candidates, and then for the presidential election itself. Two-way polls are used to demonstrate the popularity of one candidate with respect to another, but the election itself was held using first-past-the-post voting and had no runoff round. The polls are ordered by date, with the newest at the top. For more information, visit the National Election Survey Deliberation Committee of Korea.

== Graphical summary ==
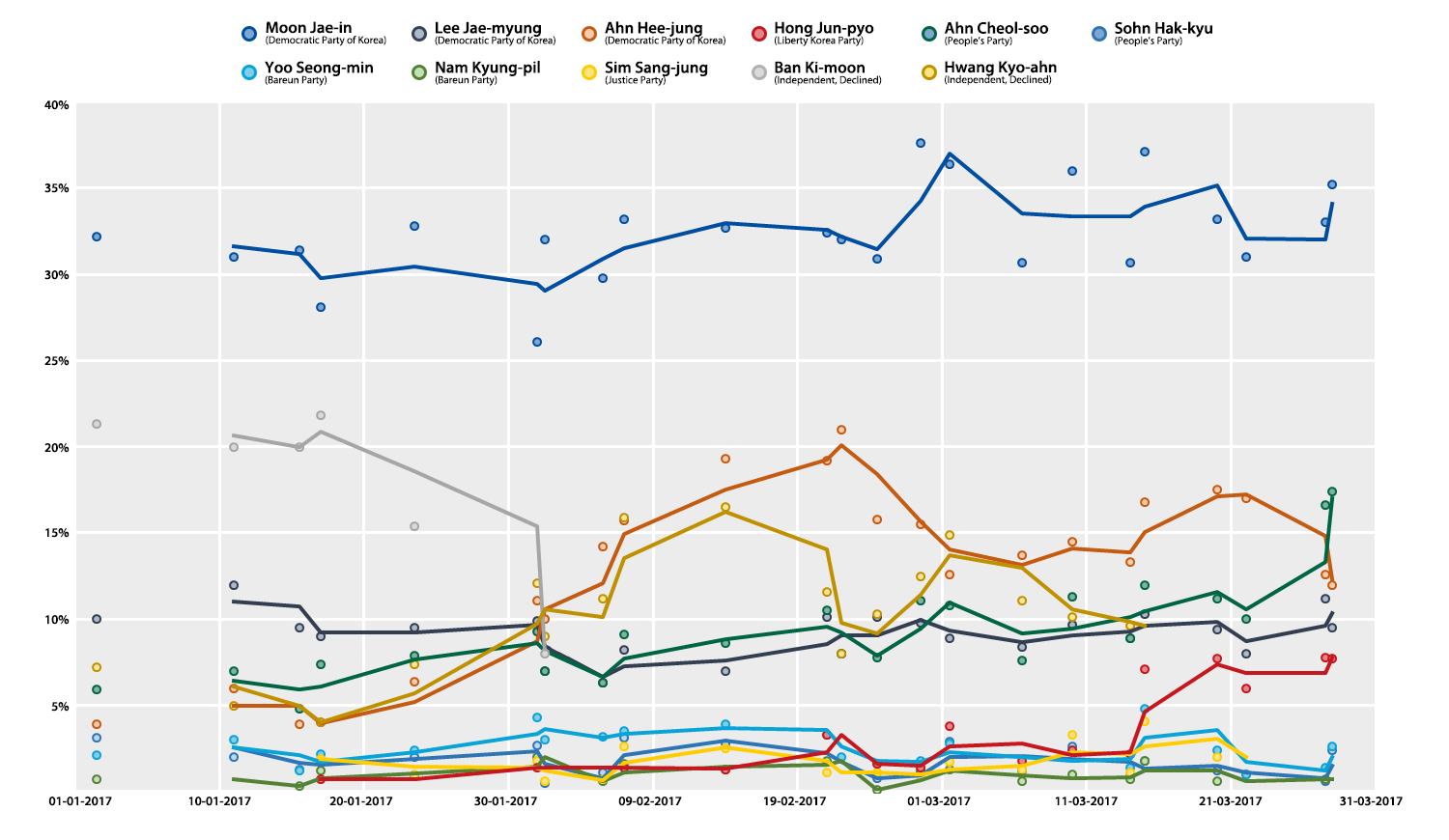
Opinion polling January–March 2017 (before candidates finalised)

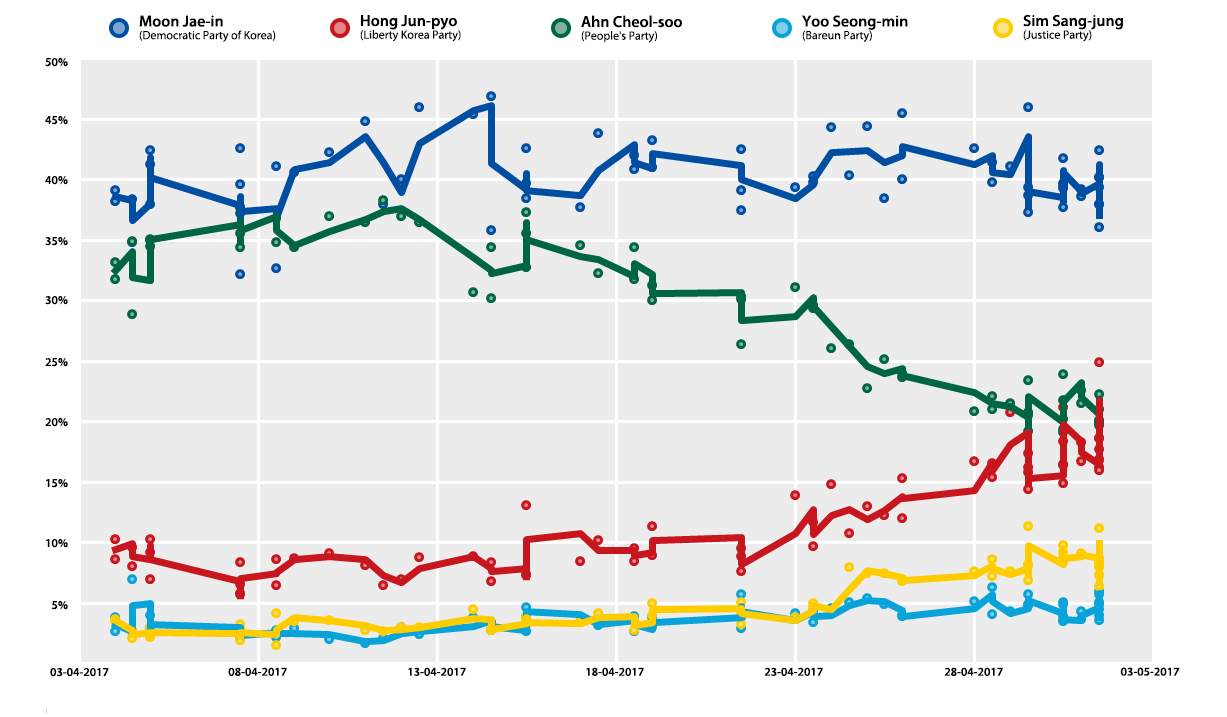
Opinion polling April–May 2017 (after candidates finalised)

== Opinion polling ==
=== 2017 ===
==== Polling after nominees finalised ====
Fieldwork date	Sample size	Margin of error	Polling firm	DPK	LKP	People	Bareun	Justice	Saenuri	Other/none/undecided	Lead
Fieldwork date	Sample size	Margin of error	Polling firm	Moon Jae-in	Hong Joon-pyo	Ahn Cheol-soo	Yoo Seong-min	Sim Sang-jung	Cho Won-jin	Other/none/undecided	Lead
9 May	32,672,175	Election result		41.09	24.04	21.42	6.76	6.17	0.13	0.39	17.05
9 May	~99,000	±0.8	KBS/MBC/SBS (exit poll)	41.4	23.3	21.8	7.1	5.9	—N/a	0.5	18.1
3 May	Polling blackout begins.										
2 May	Sixth debate takes place.										
2 May	2,058	±2.2	Embrain	40.6	19.6	17.8	4.2	7.2	0.8	10.6	21.0
1–2 May	1,015	±3.1	Gallup Korea	38	16	20	6	8	0.3	12	18
1–2 May	1,016	±3.1	Realmeter	42.4	18.6	18.6	4.9	7.3	—N/a	8.2	23.8
1 May	1,018	±3.1	Embrain	38.6	18.3	22.6	3.7	9.0	0.4	7.8	16.0
30 Apr–1 May	1,046	±3.0	Jowon C&I	39.5	18.4	23.9	3.5	8.7	—N/a	6.1	15.6
30 Apr–1 May	1,961	±2.2	R&Search	41.8	21.2	19.4	3.9	8.7	—N/a	5.0	20.6
28–29 Apr	1,010	±3.1	KSOI	43.1	17.4	23.0	4.9	8.2	—N/a	3.4	20.1
27–29 Apr	1,523	±2.5	Realmeter	42.6	16.7	20.9	5.2	7.6	1.2	7.0	21.6
28 Apr	Fifth debate takes place.										
25–27 Apr	1,418	±2.6	Research View	45.5	15.3	23.7	3.9	6.8	1.0	4.8	21.8
25–27 Apr	1,006	±3.1	Gallup Korea	40	12	24	4	7	1	13	16
26 Apr	1,000	±3.1	Korea Research	36.2	12.6	24.7	5.5	8.6	—N/a	12.4	11.5
24–26 Apr	1,520	±2.5	Realmeter	44.4	13.0	22.8	5.4	7.5	1.1	4.9	21.6
25 Apr	Fourth debate takes place.										
25 Apr	1,000	±3.1	Korea Research	40.1	12.2	25.2	4.6	5.5	—N/a	12.4	14.9
23–25 Apr	1,772	±2.3	R&Search	44.3	14.8	26.1	4.6	4.3	—N/a	5.9	18.2
24–25 Apr	1,000	±3.1	Korea Research	40.4	10.8	26.4	5.1	8.0	—N/a	9.3	14.0
23–24 Apr	1,500	±2.53	Metrix	40.3	9.7	29.6	3.4	4.7	—N/a	12.3	10.7
23–24 Apr	2,000	±2.2	JoongAng Ilbo	39.8	11.7	29.4	4.4	5.0	—N/a	9.7	10.4
22–24 Apr	1,010	±3.1	Jowon C&I	39.4	13.9	31.1	4.2	3.8	—N/a	7.6	8.3
23 Apr	Third debate takes place.										
21–22 Apr	1,030	±3.1	Kantar Public	37.5	7.6	26.4	2.9	3.3	—N/a	22.3	11.1
21–22 Apr	1,514	±2.5	Research & Research	39.1	9.5	30.1	3.8	3.1	—N/a	14.4	9.0
21–22 Apr	1,021	±3.1	KSOI	44.4	8.4	32.5	5.0	5.3	—N/a	4.4	11.9
19–21 Apr	1,530	±2.5	Realmeter	46.7	10.5	28.4	4.9	4.6	1.3	4.9	18.3
18–20 Apr	1,004	±3.1	Gallup Korea	41	9	30	3	4	0.2	12	11
18–20 Apr	2,004	±2.2	Research View	43.3	11.4	31.3	3.8	5.0	1.4	5.2	12.0
19 Apr	Second debate takes place.										
18–19 Apr	~1,000	±3.1	Research & Research	40.0	10.2	30.1	2.5	4.7	—N/a	12.5	9.9
18–19 Apr	1,054	±3.1	Embrain	40.9	9.5	34.4	2.7	2.8	—N/a	9.7	6.5
18–19 Apr	1,200	±2.8	Korea Research	42.0	8.5	31.8	3.9	3.6	—N/a	10.2	10.2
17–18 Apr	1,012	±3.1	Realmeter	43.8	10.2	32.3	3.2	4.2	—N/a	6.3	10.5
16–18 Apr	2,045	±2.2	R&Search	46.0	10.2	31.3	3.9	3.5	—N/a	5.1	14.7
15–17 Apr	1,008	±3.1	Jowon C&I	41.0	12.0	34.3	4.3	3.3	—N/a	5.1	6.7
17 Apr	1,049	±3.1	Embrain	37.7	8.5	34.6	3.4	3.5	—N/a	12.3	3.1
15–16 Apr	1,000	±3.1	Korea Research	42.6	7.3	35.6	2.7	3.9	—N/a	7.9	7.0
15–16 Apr	2,000	±2.2	JoongAng Ilbo	38.5	7.4	37.3	3.9	3.7	—N/a	9.2	1.2
14–15 Apr	1,015	±3.1	KSOI	46.9	6.8	34.4	3.4	2.9	—N/a	5.8	12.5
14–15 Apr	1,058	±3.1	Kantar Public	36.3	7.2	31.0	2.1	2.7	—N/a	20.7	5.3
14–15 Apr	1,039	±3.0	Kantar Public	35.8	8.4	30.2	2.8	2.8	—N/a	20.0	5.6
13–14 Apr	1,021	±3.1	Realmeter	44.8	10.3	31.3	3.2	3.5	—N/a	6.9	13.5
10–14 Apr	2,546	±1.9	Realmeter	44.8	9.0	34.4	2.3	3.1	—N/a	6.4	10.4
13 Apr	First debate takes place.										
12–13 Apr	1,253	±2.8	Research View	46.0	8.8	36.5	2.4	3.0	—N/a	3.3	9.5
11–13 Apr	1,010	±3.1	Gallup Korea	40	7	37	3	3	0.3	10	3
11–12 Apr	1,023	±3.1	Kantar Public	37.5	7.0	37.2	2.6	3.2	—N/a	12.5	0.3
11–12 Apr	1,000	±3.1	Korea Research	38.0	6.5	38.3	2.1	2.7	—N/a	12.4	0.3
10–12 Apr	1,525	±2.5	Realmeter	44.8	8.1	36.5	2.8	1.7	—N/a	6.1	8.3
9–11 Apr	1,997	±2.2	R&Search	42.3	9.1	37.0	2.0	3.6	—N/a	6.2 (Note: Including 1.0% for Kim Jong-in (independent).)	5.3
8–10 Apr	1,046	±3.1	Jowon C&I	40.6	8.7	34.4	2.9	3.5	—N/a	9.9	6.2
8–9 Apr	1,018	±3.1	Realmeter	41.1	8.6	34.8	2.2	4.2	—N/a	9.1 (Note: Including 0.4% for Lee Jae-oh (Evergreen Korea Party).)	6.3
8–9 Apr	2,011	±2.2	Korea Research	32.7	6.5	36.8	1.5	2.8	—N/a	19.8	4.1
7–8 Apr	1,000	±3.1	Korea Research	37.7	6.7	37.0	3.0	3.6	—N/a	7.5	0.7
7–8 Apr	2,300	±2.0	Kantar Public	35.7	7.2	37.5	2.6	2.6	—N/a	14.4	1.8
7–8 Apr	1,500	±2.5	Research & Research	35.2	7.4	34.5	2.8	3.2	—N/a	16.9	0.7
7–8 Apr	1,023	±3.1	Research Plus	37.7	6.6	37.7	2.1	2.0	—N/a	13.9 (Note: Including 0.4% for Kim Jong-in (independent).)	Tie
3–7 Apr	2,533	±1.9	Realmeter	42.2	8.9	34.1	3.2	3.6	—N/a	8.0	8.1
4–6 Apr	1,012	±3.1	Research View	42.4	10.3	35.1	2.5	2.2	—N/a	7.5	7.3
4–6 Apr	1,005	±3.1	Gallup Korea	38	7	35	4	3	—N/a	13	3
4–5 Apr	1,500	±2.5	JoongAng Ilbo	38.4	9.6	34.9	2.7	2.1	—N/a	12.3	3.5
4 Apr	1,042	±3.1	Embrain	38.0	10.4	34.4	2.1	3.6	—N/a	12.5	3.6
4 Apr	1,000	±3.1	Realmeter	41.3	9.2	34.5	3.0	2.5	—N/a	9.5	6.8
4 Apr	1,000	±3.1	Korea Research	39.1	8.6	31.8	3.8	3.7	—N/a	13.0	7.3
3–4 Apr	1,708	±2.4	R&Search	40.8	12.6	30.9	2.8	3.8	—N/a	9.1	9.9

==== Polling before nominees finalised ====
Fieldwork date	Sample size	Margin of error	Polling firm	DPK				LKP (Note: Before 13 February: Saenuri Party.)		People		Bareun		Justice	Ind.		Other/none/undecided	Lead
Fieldwork date	Sample size	Margin of error	Polling firm	Moon Jae-in	Ahn Hee-jung	Lee Jae-myung	Park Won-soon	Hong Joon-pyo	Kim Jin-tae	Ahn Cheol-soo	Sohn Hak-kyu	Yoo Seong-min	Nam Kyung-pil	Sim Sang-jung	Ban Ki-moon	Hwang Kyo-ahn	Other/none/undecided	Lead
4 Apr	Ahn Cheol-soo wins the People Party primary.																	
3 Apr	Moon Jae-in wins the Democratic primary.																	
1–3 Apr	1,031	±3.1	Jowon C&I	35.3	—N/a	—N/a	—N/a	13.6	—N/a	21.6	1.4	3.2	—N/a	1.7	—N/a	—N/a	23.2	13.7
31 Mar	Hong Joon-pyo wins the Liberty Korea primary.																	
28–30 Mar	1,010	±3.1	Gallup Korea	31	14	8	—N/a	4	—N/a	19	—N/a	2	—N/a	1	—N/a	—N/a	21	12
27–31 Mar	2,550	±1.9	Realmeter	34.9	12.1	10.0	—N/a	2.9	—N/a	18.7	1.7	2.9	—N/a	2.9	—N/a	—N/a	13.9	16.2
27–29 Mar	1,525	±2.5	Realmeter	35.2	12.0	9.5	—N/a	7.7	5.3	17.4	2.4	2.6	—N/a	3.4	—N/a	—N/a	4.5	17.8
27–29 Mar	1,525	±2.5	Realmeter	43.9	—N/a	—N/a	—N/a	11.1	—N/a	21.0	—N/a	3.0	—N/a	4.8	—N/a	—N/a	16.2	22.9
28 Mar	Yoo Seong-min wins the Bareun primary.																	
27–28 Mar	1,080	±3.0	R&Search	33.0	12.6	11.2	—N/a	7.8	6.1	16.6	0.6	1.4	0.7	2.0	—N/a	—N/a	8.5	16.4
25–27 Mar	1,026	±3.1	Jowon C&I	33.2	13.5	9.9	—N/a	12.5	—N/a	13.1	1.4	3.7	—N/a	2.6	—N/a	—N/a	3.8	19.7
26 Mar	Liberty Korea primary begins.																	
23–25 Mar	1,772	±2.3	R&Search	33.2	17.5	9.4	—N/a	7.7	?	11.2	1.2	2.4	?	2.0	—N/a	—N/a	?	15.7
25 Mar	People Party primary begins.																	
20–24 Mar	2,553	±1.9	Realmeter	34.4	17.1	10.2	—N/a	9.5	5.0	12.6	2.2	2.2	1.0	2.9	—N/a	—N/a	2.9	17.3
21–23 Mar	1,007	±3.1	Gallup Korea	31	17	8	—N/a	6	—N/a	10	1	1	—N/a	2	—N/a	—N/a	24	14
22 Mar	Democratic primary begins.																	
19–21 Mar	1,589	±2.5	R&Search	33.2	17.5	9.4	—N/a	7.7	—N/a	11.2	1.2	2.4	0.6	2.0	—N/a	—N/a	14.8	15.7
18–20 Mar	1,062	±3.1	Jowon C&I	36.2	14.1	9.8	—N/a	10.1	—N/a	14.0	1.4	2.7	—N/a	1.5	—N/a	—N/a	3.0	22.1
15–17 Mar	2,025	±2.2	Realmeter	36.6	15.6	10.8	—N/a	9.8	—N/a	12.0	1.8	3.8	—N/a	3.9	—N/a	—N/a	5.7	21.0
14–16 Mar	1,004	±3.1	Realmeter	33	18	8	—N/a	2	—N/a	10	0.3	0.4	—N/a	1	—N/a	7	20.3	15
15 Mar	1,015	±3.1	Realmeter	37.1	16.8	10.3	—N/a	7.1	—N/a	12.0	1.8	4.8	1.8	4.1	—N/a	—N/a	4.2	20.3
15 Mar	1,029	±3.1	Embrain	42.6	—N/a	—N/a	—N/a	10.4	—N/a	18.4	—N/a	5.3	—N/a	4.1	—N/a	—N/a	17.5	24.6
15 Mar	1,029	±3.1	Embrain	41.7	—N/a	—N/a	—N/a	—N/a	—N/a	17.1	—N/a	5.0	—N/a	4.1	—N/a	16.2	15.9	24.2
15 Mar	Hwang Kyo-ahn (independent) declares he will not run for president.																	
14 Mar	1,000	±3.1	Korea Research	30.7	13.3	8.9	—N/a	2.2	—N/a	8.9	0.9	1.4	0.7	1.1	—N/a	9.6	22.3	7.4
12–14 Mar	1,360	±2.7	R&Search	34.5	15.3	9.6	—N/a	3.3	—N/a	11.3	1.6	3.0	—N/a	1.7	—N/a	10.2	9.5	
10 Mar	1,008	±3.1	Realmeter	36.0	14.5	9.7	—N/a	2.4	—N/a	11.3	2.6	2.4	1.0	3.3	—N/a	10.1	6.7	21.5
10 Mar	The impeachment of Park Geun-hye (Liberty Korea) is upheld by the Constitutional Court.																	
6–10 Mar	2,544	?	Realmeter	35.1	14.1	10.3	—N/a	3.6	—N/a	10.2	2.1	3.1	—N/a	2.0	—N/a	13.5	6.0	21.0
7–9 Mar	?	?	Gallup Korea	32	17	8	—N/a	1	—N/a	9	—N/a	1	—N/a	1	—N/a	9	22	15
6–7 Mar	1,000	±3.1	Korea Research	30.7	13.7	8.4	—N/a	1.8	—N/a	7.6	1.2	1.2	0.6	1.3	—N/a	11.1	22.4	17.0
6–7 Mar	1,252	±2.8	R&Search	35.3	13.3	9.3	—N/a	2.9	—N/a	8.2	1.8	2.7	—N/a	1.5	—N/a	13.8	11.2	21.5
27 Feb–3 Mar	2,025	±2.2	Realmeter	36.4	12.6	8.9	—N/a	3.8	—N/a	10.8	2.9	2.8	—N/a	1.7	—N/a	14.9	5.2	21.5
28 Feb–2 Mar	1,010	±3.1	Gallup Korea	34	15	8	—N/a	0.3	—N/a	9	—N/a	1	—N/a	0.3	—N/a	8	24.4	19
27–28 Feb	1,111	?	R&Search	37.6	15.5	9.8	—N/a	1.4	—N/a	11.1	1.1	1.8	1.2	0.9	—N/a	12.5	8.3	22.1
25–27 Feb	1,017	±3.1	Jowon C&I	35.2	16.1	8.9	—N/a	—N/a	—N/a	11.0	1.7	3.0	—N/a	2.0	—N/a	14.8	7.3	19.1
24–25 Feb	1,000	±3.1	Korea Research	30.9	15.8	10.1	—N/a	1.6	—N/a	7.8	0.8	1.6	0.1	1.1	—N/a	10.3	19.9	15.1
20–24 Feb	2,516	±2.0	Realmeter	33.5	18.9	10.1	—N/a	3.6	—N/a	10.1	2.2	3.5	—N/a	1.3	—N/a	10.9	5.9	14.6
21–23 Feb	1,006	±3.1	Gallup Korea	32	21	8	—N/a	—N/a	—N/a	8	—N/a	2	—N/a	—N/a	—N/a	8	21	11
20–22 Feb	1,508	±2.5	Realmeter	32.4	19.2	10.1	—N/a	3.3	—N/a	10.5	1.7	3.3	1.8	1.1	—N/a	11.6	5.0	13.2
20–21 Feb	1,209	±2.8	R&Search	34.1	20.7	9.0	—N/a	1.0	—N/a	9.6	2.0	3.6	—N/a	0.5	—N/a	11.1	8.4	13.4
18–20 Feb	1,052	±3.1	Jowon C&I	35.6	21.6	7.1	—N/a	—N/a	—N/a	8.5	2.2	4.5	—N/a	1.3	—N/a	14.2	5.0	14.0
13–17 Feb	1,521	±2.0	Realmeter	32.5	20.4	8.1	—N/a	1.8	—N/a	8.8	2.6	3.9	—N/a	2.1	—N/a	14.8	5.0	12.1
16 Feb	Sim Sang-jung wins the Justice primary.																	
13 Feb	Saenuri rebrands to Liberty Korea.																	
14–16 Feb	1,003	±3.1	Gallup Korea	33	22	5	—N/a	—N/a	—N/a	9	1	2	—N/a	—N/a	—N/a	9	19	11
13–15 Feb	1,515	±2.5	Realmeter	32.7	19.3	7.0	—N/a	1.3	—N/a	8.6	2.8	3.9	1.3	2.5	—N/a	16.5	4.1	13.4
14 Feb	1,082	±3.0	R&Search	36.2	19.2	6.8	—N/a	—N/a	—N/a	8.6	1.7	2.7	—N/a	0.7	—N/a	13.2	10.9	17.0
6–10 Feb	2,511	±2.0	Realmeter	32.9	16.7	7.8	—N/a	1.8	—N/a	9.5	3.2	3.9	—N/a	2.3	—N/a	15.3	6.6	16.2
7–9 Feb	1,007	±3.1	Gallup Korea	29	19	8	—N/a	—N/a	—N/a	7	1	3	—N/a	—N/a	—N/a	11	22	10
6–8 Feb	1,508	±2.5	Realmeter	33.2	15.7	8.2	—N/a	1.4	—N/a	9.1	3.1	3.5	1.9	2.6	—N/a	15.9	5.4	17.5
5–6 Feb	2,016	±2.2	Korea Research	29.8	14.2	6.3	—N/a	—N/a	—N/a	6.3	1.1	3.2	0.6	0.7	—N/a	11.2	26.6	15.6
1–3 Feb	1,519	±2.5	Realmeter	31.2	13.0	8.6	—N/a	1.5	—N/a	10.9	2.3	4.9	—N/a	1.1	—N/a	12.4	14.1	18.2
1–2 Feb	1,003	±3.1	Embrain	33.1	12.3	8.9	—N/a	—N/a	—N/a	9.2	1.7	4.6	0.8	1.3	—N/a	11.8	16.3 (Note: Including 0.7% for Kim Boo-kyum (DPK) and 0.7% for Kim Moon-soo (LKP).)	20.8
1–2 Feb	?	?	Kantar Public	29.8	13.0	8.9	—N/a	—N/a	—N/a	9.2	1.5	2.7	<1	<1	—N/a	9.4	25.5 (Note: Including <1% for Kim Boo-kyum (DPK) and <1% for Kim Moon-soo (LKP).)	16.8
1–2 Feb	1,003	±3.1	Gallup Korea	32	10	7	—N/a	—N/a	—N/a	7	0.5	3	—N/a	0.6	8	9	22.9	22
1 Feb	1,009	±3.1	Realmeter	26.1	11.1	9.9	—N/a	—N/a	—N/a	9.3	—N/a	4.3	—N/a	—N/a	—N/a	12.1	27.2	14.0
1 Feb	1,009	±3.1	Realmeter	26.1	11.1	9.9	—N/a	1.4	—N/a	9.3	2.7	4.3	2.0	1.8	—N/a	12.1	19.3	14.0
1 Feb	1,000	±3.1	Realmeter	25.4	11.2	9.6	—N/a	—N/a	—N/a	9.0	—N/a	4.9	—N/a	—N/a	—N/a	10.5	29.4	14.2
31 Jan–1 Feb	1,021	±3.1	Embrain	33.9	8.2	9.0	—N/a	—N/a	—N/a	8.1	1.6	3.4	0.9	0.8	13.0	7.8	13.3 (Note: Including 0.3% for Kim Boo-kyum (DPK) and 0.2% for Kim Moon-soo (LKP).)	20.6
1 Feb	Ban Ki-moon (independent) declares he will not run for president.																	
30 Jan	1,011	±3.1	Research & Research	32.8	9.1	10.5	—N/a	0.3	—N/a	7.6	0.7	2.8	1.6	—N/a	13.1	8.3	13.5 (Note: Including 0.6% for Kim Boo-kyum (DPK).)	19.7
28–30 Jan	1,096	±3.0	Jowon C&I	32.0	8.4	9.3	—N/a	—N/a	—N/a	9.1	—N/a	—N/a	—N/a	—N/a	—N/a	8.2	33.0 (Note: Including unknown support for Ban Ki-moon (independent).)	22.7
26 Jan	Park Won-soon (DPK) declares he will not run for president.																	
23–26 Jan	2,019	±2.2	Realmeter	28.4	6.8	9.6	—N/a	0.3	—N/a	8.5	2.1	2.4	—N/a	1.2	16.5	5.5	18.7	11.9
23–24 Jan	1,000	±3.1	Embrain	31.2	7.4	10.7	2.1	—N/a	—N/a	7.4	1.6	1.8	0.4	0.4	16.0	7.9	12.0 (Note: Including 0.9% for Kim Boo-kyum (DPK).)	11.9
23–24 Jan	1,004	±3.1	Realmeter	32.8	6.4	9.5	—N/a	—N/a	—N/a	7.9	2.0	2.4	0.9	1.0	15.4	7.4	14.3	17.4
22–23 Jan	1,124	±2.9	R&Search	34.8	5.8	9.3	2.0	—N/a	—N/a	6.3	2.3	2.3	—N/a	1.7	18.0	7.0	10.5	16.8
16–20 Jan	2,520	±2.0	Realmeter	29.1	4.7	10.1	3.4	0.9	—N/a	7.4	1.8	2.2	—N/a	1.6	19.8	4.6	14.4	9.3
16–18 Jan	1,507	±2.5	Realmeter	28.1	4.0	9.0	—N/a	0.7	—N/a	4.0	7.4	1.8	—N/a	1.9	21.8	4.0	17.3	6.3
15–16 Jan	1,00	±3.1	Korea Reaearch	31.4	3.9	9.5	—N/a	—N/a	—N/a	4.8	1.3	1.2	—N/a	—N/a	20.0	—N/a	27.9	11.4
15–16 Jan	1,165	±2.9	R&Search	32.0	4.4	9.5	2.8	2.8	—N/a	6.2	1.8	1.5	—N/a	—N/a	24.0	4.7	13.1	8.0
10–12 Jan	1,007	±3.1	Gallup Korea	31	6	12	—N/a	—N/a	—N/a	7	2	3	—N/a	—N/a	20	5	14	11
9–13 Jan	2,526	±1.9	Realmeter	26.1	4.9	11.7	4.4	1.3	—N/a	7.0	2.3	2.2	—N/a	2.2	22.2	—N/a	15.7	3.9
8–9 Jan	1,065	±3.0	R&Search	32.5	3.3	10.5	3.3	—N/a	—N/a	6.0	2.0	1.3	—N/a	—N/a	21.3	5.6	14.2	11.2
2–6 Jan	2,525	±2.0	Realmeter	26.8	5.0	12.0	4.3	1.0	—N/a	6.5	3.0	3.4	—N/a	—N/a	21.5	—N/a	16.5	5.3
1–2 Jan	1,153	±2.9	R&Search	32.2	3.9	10.0	3.3	—N/a	—N/a	5.9	3.1	2.1	—N/a	—N/a	21.3	7.2	11.0	10.9
1–2 Jan	1,004	±3.1	Gallup Korea	29	3	10	—N/a	—N/a	—N/a	5	1.4	1.3	—N/a	0.2	18	3	29.1	11

=== Hypothetical polling ===
==== Four-way race ====
Fieldwork date	Sample size	Margin of error	Polling firm	DPK	LKP	People	Bareun	Justice	Other/none/undecided	Lead
Fieldwork date	Sample size	Margin of error	Polling firm	Moon Jae-in	Hong Joon-pyo	Ahn Cheol-soo	Yoo Seong-min	Sim Sang-jung	Other/none/undecided	Lead
28–29 Apr	1,010	±3.1	KSOI	42.0	19.2	24.8	—N/a (Note: Yoo endorses Hong.)	10.7	3.3	17.2
28–29 Apr	1,010	±3.1	KSOI	41.6	16.1	28.3	—N/a (Note: Yoo endorses Ahn.)	10.6	3.4	13.3
23–24 Apr	1,500	±2.53	Metrix	39.8	9.8	31.3	—N/a	5.0	14.1	8.5
18–19 Apr	1,054	±3.1	Embrain	43.1	10.6	34.2	—N/a	3.0	9.1	8.9
18–19 Apr	1,054	±3.1	Embrain	42.3	—N/a	39.2	3.7	2.8	12.0	3.1
17 Apr	1,049	±3.1	Embrain	38.6	—N/a	39.3	5.0	?	?	0.7
17 Apr	1,049	±3.1	Embrain	39.2	9.0	35.4	—N/a	?	?	3.8
14–15 Apr	1,015	±3.1	KSOI	44.1	9.1	36.9	—N/a	4.0	5.9	7.2
14–15 Apr	1,015	±3.1	KSOI	45.0	7.0	38.4	—N/a	3.8	5.8	6.6
8–9 Apr	2,011	±2.2	Korea Research	32.8	9.4	37.1	—N/a	2.9	17.8	4.3
8–9 Apr	2,011	±2.2	Korea Research	32.3	—N/a (Note: Hong endorses Yoo.)	39.1	5.7	2.8	20.1	6.8
8–9 Apr	2,011	±2.2	Korea Research	33.6	7.4	40.4	—N/a	2.9	15.7	6.8
7–8 Apr	2,300	±2.0	Kantar Public	36.3	8.2	40.1	—N/a	2.7	12.6	3.8
7–8 Apr	2,300	±2.0	Kantar Public	36.2	—N/a	43.8	4.6	2.6	12.9	7.6
7–8 Apr	1,500	±2.5	Research & Research	35.2	?	36.8	—N/a	?	?	1.6
7–8 Apr	1,500	±2.5	Research & Research	36.7	?	40.5	—N/a	?	?	3.8
7–8 Apr	1,023	±3.1	Research Plus	35.8	10.5	37.4	—N/a	2.6	13.7	2.6
7–8 Apr	1,023	±3.1	Research Plus	37.2	7.9	42.3	—N/a	2.5	10.1	5.1
4 Apr	1,042	±3.1	Embrain	39.0	—N/a	41.0	4.0	?	?	2.0
4 Apr	1,042	±3.1	Embrain	38.8	11.4	36.2	—N/a	?	?	2.6

==== Three-way race ====
Fieldwork date	Sample size	Margin of error	Polling firm	DPK	LKP	People	Bareun	Justice	Other/none/undecided	Lead
Fieldwork date	Sample size	Margin of error	Polling firm	Moon Jae-in	Hong Joon-pyo	Ahn Cheol-soo	Yoo Seong-min	Sim Sang-jung	Other/none/undecided	Lead
23–24 Apr	1,500	±2.53	Metrix	43.2	10.5	33.6	—N/a	—N/a	12.7	9.6
23–24 Apr	2,000	±2.2	JoongAng Ilbo	44.3	12.7	35.3	—N/a	—N/a	7.7	9.0
23–24 Apr	2,000	±2.2	JoongAng Ilbo	43.0	—N/a	37.0	10.3	—N/a	9.7	6.0
18–19 Apr	1,054	±3.1	Embrain	42.5	—N/a	41.1	—N/a	3.6	12.8	1.4
15–16 Apr	2,000	±2.2	JoongAng Ilbo	43.5	9.6	42.9	—N/a	—N/a	4.0	0.6
12–13 Apr	1,253	±2.8	Research View	49.8	9.0	39.4	—N/a	—N/a	1.8	10.4
12–13 Apr	1,253	±2.8	Research View	48.2	—N/a	39.0	9.1	—N/a	3.7	9.2
10–12 Apr	1,525	±2.5	Realmeter	47.0	8.8	37.2	—N/a	—N/a	7.0	9.8
7–8 Apr	1,023	±3.1	Research Plus	38.5	—N/a	47.4	—N/a	2.7	11.4	8.9
4–6 Apr	1,012	±3.1	Research View	44.9	11.5	38.9	—N/a	—N/a	4.7	6.0
4–6 Apr	1,012	±3.1	Research View	45.2	—N/a	36.3	10.4	—N/a	8.1	8.9
4–5 Apr	1,500	±2.5	JoongAng Ilbo	41.9	12.2	40.8	—N/a	—N/a	5.1	1.1
4–5 Apr	1,500	±2.5	JoongAng Ilbo	41.4	—N/a	45.0	7.4	—N/a	6.2	3.6
4 Apr	1,042	±3.1	Embrain	39.4	—N/a	43.7	—N/a	4.2	12.7	4.3
15 Mar	1,029	±3.1	Embrain	46.0	—N/a	23.8	9.4	—N/a	20.8	22.2
15 Mar	1,029	±3.1	Embrain	46.7	12.4	23.2	—N/a	—N/a	17.7	23.5

==== Two-way race ====
Fieldwork date	Sample size	Margin of error	Polling firm	DPK	LKP	People	Other/none/undecided	Lead
Fieldwork date	Sample size	Margin of error	Polling firm	Moon Jae-in	Hong Joon-pyo	Ahn Cheol-soo	Other/none/undecided	Lead
28–29 Apr	1,010	±3.1	KSOI	53.0	—N/a	41.2	5.8	11.8
21–22 Apr	1,030	±3.1	Kantar Public	41.4	—N/a	41.0	17.6	0.4
15–17 Apr	1,008	±3.1	Jowon C&I	44.8	—N/a	44.9	10.3	0.1
15–16 Apr	2,000	±2.2	JoongAng Ilbo	44.4	—N/a	50.2	5.4	5.8
14–15 Apr	1,015	±3.1	KSOI	50.3	—N/a	42.7	7.0	7.6
14–15 Apr	1,058	±3.1	Kantar Public	40.3	—N/a	42.6	17.1	2.3
10–12 Apr	1,525	±2.5	Realmeter	49.0	—N/a	41.1	9.9	7.9
10–12 Apr	1,525	±2.5	Realmeter	56.3	22.7	—N/a	21.0	33.6
8–9 Apr	2,011	±2.2	Korea Research	36.2	—N/a	49.4	14.4	13.2
7–8 Apr	2,300	±2.0	Kantar Public	38.3	—N/a	51.4	10.4	13.1
7–8 Apr	1,500	±2.5	Research & Research	39.2	—N/a	48.4	12.4	9.2
7–8 Apr	1,023	±3.1	Research Plus	41.8	—N/a	48.2	10.0	6.4
4–5 Apr	1,500	±2.5	JoongAng Ilbo	42.7	—N/a	50.7	6.6	8.0
4 Apr	1,042	±3.1	Embrain	40.8	—N/a	47.0	12.2	6.2
4 Apr	1,042	±3.1	Embrain	58.5	22.4	—N/a	19.1	36.1
1–3 Apr	1,031	±3.1	Jowon C&I	43.7	—N/a	48.1	8.2	4.4
2 Apr	1,000	±3.1	Naeil Shinmun/The Opinion	36.4	—N/a	43.6	20.0	7.2

Fieldwork date	Sample size	Margin of error	Polling firm	DPK			Ind	People	Other/none/undecided	Lead
Fieldwork date	Sample size	Margin of error	Polling firm	Moon Jae-in	Ahn Hee-jung	Lee Jae-myung	Ban Ki-moon	Ahn Cheol-soo	Other/none/undecided	Lead
15 Mar	1,029	±3.1	Embrain	46.8	—N/a	—N/a	—N/a	31.8	21.4	15.0
15 Mar	1,029	±3.1	Embrain	—N/a	50.5	—N/a	—N/a	28.3	21.2	22.2
31 Jan–1 Feb	1,032	±3.1	Research & Research	42.7	—N/a	—N/a	—N/a	31.6	25.7	11.1
30 Jan	1,011	±3.1	Research & Research	52.6	—N/a	—N/a	25.6	—N/a	21.8	27.0
23–24 Jan	1,000	±3.1	Embrain	55.6	—N/a	—N/a	32.3	—N/a	12.1	23.3
23–24 Jan	1,000	±3.1	Embrain	—N/a	52.5	—N/a	31.3	—N/a	16.2	21.2
23–24 Jan	1,000	±3.1	Embrain	—N/a	—N/a	51.6	33.5	—N/a	14.9	18.1
23–24 Jan	1,000	±3.1	Embrain	50.3	—N/a	—N/a	—N/a	32.5	17.2	17.8

== 2016 ==
Fieldwork date	Sample size	Margin of error	Polling firm	DPK				Saenuri			People		Ind.	Other/none/undecided	Lead
Fieldwork date	Sample size	Margin of error	Polling firm	Moon Jae-in	Ahn Hee-jung	Lee Jae-myung	Park Won-soon	Kim Moo-sung	Oh Se-hoon	Yoo Seong-min	Ahn Cheol-soo	Sohn Hak-kyu	Ban Ki-moon	Other/none/undecided	Lead
26–30 Dec	2,531	±2.9	Realmeter	23.0	4.2	11.2	3.9	—N/a	4.1	2.4	7.5	3.5	23.5	16.7	0.5
27–29 Dec	1,000	±3.1	Korea Research	25.6	5.1	12.0	3.5	—N/a	1.8	1.9	4.8	3.1	17.4	27.9 (Note: Including 1.1% for Kim Moon-soo (Saenuri), 0.8% for Kim Boo-kyum (DPK), 0.4% for Nam Kyung-pil (CNPR), and 0.3% for Chun Jung-bae (People).)	8.2
19–23 Dec	2,528	±1.9	Realmeter	23.1	4.9	12.3	3.9	—N/a	3.8	2.5	8.2	3.5	23.3	14.5	0.2
19–21 Dec	1,519	±2.5	Realmeter	22.2	4.7	11.9	4.4	—N/a	?	?	8.6	?	23.1	?	0.9
21 December	Ban Ki-moon (independent) officially declares his candidacy for president.														
12–16 Dec	2,528	±1.9	Realmeter	23.7	4.3	14.9	4.2	—N/a	2.9	2.2	8.3	3.4	20.5	15.6	3.2
12 Dec	1,009	±3.1	Time Research	26.2	—N/a	18.5	5.4	—N/a	3.5	4.3	7.6	4.0	19.1	11.5	7.1
9 December	President Park Geun-hye (Saenuri) is impeached by the National Assembly.														
5–9 Dec	2,517	±1.9	Realmeter	23.1	3.6	16.2	4.5	—N/a	3.3	2.2	8.0	3.8	18.8	16.5	4.3
6–8 Dec	1,012	±3.1	Gallup Korea	20	5	18	3	—N/a	—N/a	3	8	3	20	20	Tie
28 Nov–2 Dec	2,528	±1.9	Realmeter	20.8	4.1	14.7	4.3	—N/a	3.7	2.7	9.8	4.4	18.9	16.6	1.9
21–25 Nov	2,532	±1.9	Realmeter	21.0	3.9	11.9	5.4	—N/a	2.8	3.1	11.8	4.0	17.7	18.4	3.3
14–18 Nov	2,543	±1.9	Realmeter	20.4	3.6	10.0	5.6	3.2	3.5	2.9	12.0	3.7	18.1	17.0	2.3
7–11 Nov	2,531	±1.9	Realmeter	21.4	3.7	9.0	5.3	3.6	4.1	3.6	10.2	4.0	17.2	17.9	4.2
8–10 Nov	1,003	±3.1	Gallup Korea	19	—N/a	8	6	2	—N/a	4	10	6	21	24	2
30 Oct–4 Nov	2,528	±1.9	Realmeter	20.9	4.3	9.1	5.9	2.9	4.2	4.1	10.7	3.9	17.1	16.9	3.8
25 October	The Choi Soon-sil scandal breaks.														
24–28 Oct	2,545	±1.9	Realmeter	20.3	4.2	5.9	6.1	2.7	4.5	3.4	10.5	3.2	20.9	18.3	0.6
17–21 Oct	2,543	±1.9	Realmeter	18.9	3.8	5.3	6.4	3.8	5.4	3.0	9.3	3.4	22.2	18.5	3.3
10–14 Oct	2,522	±2.0	Realmeter	20.1	3.9	4.6	6.0	4.0	4.8	2.6	9.6	3.0	24.0	17.4	3.9
11–13 Oct	1,026	±3.1	Gallup Korea	18	4	5	6	3	—N/a	4	9	—N/a	27	24	9
4–7 Oct	2,032	±2.2	Realmeter	17.9	4.4	5.1	4.9	3.6	5.4	2.3	10.4	3.3	23.5	19.2	5.6
26–30 Sep	2,525	±2.0	Realmeter	18.4	4.8	3.8	4.9	3.5	4.7	3.1	9.7	3.1	26.8	17.2	8.4
19–23 Sep	2,530	±1.9	Realmeter	18.5	3.6	5.1	6.0	3.8	3.7	2.8	10.3	3.8	23.7	18.7	5.2
12–13 Sep	1,017	±3.1	Realmeter	19.0	3.1	5.1	6.2	3.8	3.5	3.7	10.0	3.3	25.7	16.6	6.7
5–9 Sep	2,528	±1.9	Realmeter	18.0	3.2	3.7	5.9	4.3	4.3	3.1	10.4	4.2	22.8	20.1	4.8
6–8 Sep	1,009	±3.1	Gallup Korea	18	—N/a	4	6	3	5	—N/a	8	3	27	26	9
29 Aug–2 Sep	2,526	±1.9	Realmeter	19.0	—N/a	3.6	6.9	3.5	5.4	3.1	10.5	4.3	21.8	21.9	2.8
22–26 Aug	2,529	±1.9	Realmeter	17.9	—N/a	3.9	6.7	4.4	4.9	2.4	10.4	3.5	23.5	22.1	5.6
16–19 Aug	2,018	±2.2	Realmeter	19.2	—N/a	3.9	5.8	4.0	5.4	3.3	9.7	4.1	24.8	19.8	5.6
8–12 Aug	2,531	±1.9	Realmeter	19.2	—N/a	3.6	6.4	5.3	4.8	2.9	8.5	3.8	23.8	21.7	4.6
9–11 Aug	1,004	±3.1	Gallup Korea	16	—N/a	2	6	3	5	—N/a	8	4	28	28	12
1–5 Aug	2,529	±1.9	Realmeter	19.0	—N/a	3.9	6.0	5.9	5.8	3.8	9.0	4.5	21.3	20.8	2.3
25–29 Jul	2,530	±1.9	Realmeter	20.5	—N/a	3.9	6.4	4.8	5.9	2.8	10.1	4.3	20.4	20.9	0.1
18–22 Jul	2,523	±2.0	Realmeter	19.9	—N/a	3.4	6.5	4.8	6.2	4.3	11.5	3.9	20.2	19.3	0.3
11–15 Jul	2,526	±1.9	Realmeter	18.9	3.2	2.9	6.2	4.9	4.9	4.5	12.1	—N/a	21.5	20.9	2.6
12–14 Jul	1,004	±3.1	Gallup Korea	16	—N/a	2	6	3	—N/a	4	11	4	27	27	11
4–8 Jul	2,528	±1.9	Realmeter	19.5	3.4	3.2	7.0	4.1	6.0	3.5	11.6	—N/a	23.0	18.7	3.5
27 Jun–1 Jul	2,542	±1.9	Realmeter	19.3	3.8	3.8	6.9	4.3	5.7	4.1	12.8	—N/a	23.4	15.9	4.1
20–24 Jun	2,539	±1.9	Realmeter	21.4	3.5	3.7	6.2	4.0	5.3	5.0	11.5	—N/a	23.2	16.2	1.8
13–17 Jun	2,536	±1.9	Realmeter	21.9	3.1	4.4	5.8	4.6	5.3	4.2	12.3	—N/a	22.4	16.0	0.5
7–10 Jun	2,035	±2.2	Realmeter	24.1	2.9	3.5	5.6	4.2	5.9	3.0	12.4	—N/a	25.0	13.4	0.9
6–9 Jun	1,002	±3.1	Gallup Korea	16	—N/a	—N/a	6	2	4	3	10	3	26	30	10
30 May–3 Jun	3,031	±1.8	Realmeter	23.2	4.2	4.0	6.7	4.1	5.0	3.3	11.9	—N/a	24.1	13.5	0.9
23–27 May	2,532	±1.9	Realmeter	21.5	4.0	3.3	7.9	6.6	10.4	4.5	16.1	—N/a	—N/a	25.7	5.4
16–20 May	2,531	±1.9	Realmeter	24.2	3.2	3.0	7.6	6.5	9.9	4.6	17.9	—N/a	—N/a	23.1	6.3
9–13 May	2,526	±1.9	Realmeter	25.7	2.8	3.1	5.7	6.7	11.9	4.3	17.5	—N/a	—N/a	22.3	8.2
10–12 May	1,005	±3.1	Gallup Korea	18	—N/a	2	6	5	9	3	20	—N/a	—N/a	33	2
2–6 May	2,028	±2.2	Realmeter	27.1	2.6	2.8	5.7	7.4	12.1	2.9	17.2	—N/a	—N/a	22.2	9.9
25–29 Apr	2,533	±1.9	Realmeter	25.2	2.0	2.4	6.3	7.6	10.4	4.1	19.1	—N/a	—N/a	22.9	6.1
26–28 Apr	1,001	±3.1	Gallup Korea	17	2	—N/a	6	3	7	4	21	—N/a	—N/a	31	4
18–22 Apr	2,536	±1.9	Realmeter	27.0	2.6	3.4	5.4	7.8	9.6	3.7	18.4	—N/a	—N/a	22.1	8.6
14–15 Apr	1,012	±3.1	Realmeter	24.7	2.6	2.5	6.9	8.7	10.1	5.0	18.9	—N/a	—N/a	20.6	5.8
13 April	The 2016 legislative election takes place.														
~8 Apr	?	?	Realmeter	20.1	2.6	4.0	6.7	13.9	14.9	4.8	14.2	—N/a	—N/a	18.8	5.2
28 Mar–1 Apr	2,528	±1.9	Realmeter	20.7	2.7	4.7	5.9	12.9	15.4	6.4	10.0	—N/a	—N/a	21.3	5.3
21–25 Mar	2,522	±2.0	Realmeter	21.4	2.0	4.2	6.9	14.4	13.8	6.1	9.6	—N/a	—N/a	21.6	7.0
14–18 Mar	2,524	±2.0	Realmeter	21.5	2.1	3.9	8.1	16.6	12.0	4.9	10.6	—N/a	—N/a	20.3	4.9
7–11 Mar	2,526	±1.9	Realmeter	21.2	2.4	3.9	8.0	17.6	11.4	3.9	10.0	—N/a	—N/a	21.6	3.6
8–10 Mar	1,005	±3.1	Gallup Korea	16	—N/a	2	9	11	9	3	10	—N/a	—N/a	34	5
29 Feb/2–4 Mar	?	±2.2	Realmeter	21.3	4.1	—N/a	7.4	17.8	11.1	5.6	9.9	—N/a	—N/a	22.8	3.5
22–26 Feb	2,529	±1.9	Realmeter	19.6	4.1	—N/a	9.8	16.5	9.8	3.4	11.1	—N/a	—N/a	25.7	3.1
15–19 Feb	2,512	±2.0	Realmeter	22.2	2.8	—N/a	8.2	18.5	8.6	3.9	11.6	—N/a	—N/a	24.2	3.7
11–12 Feb	~1,000	±3.1	Korea Research	17.9	—N/a	—N/a	10.5	8.6	7.9	—N/a	7.8	3.5	28.3	15.5 (Note: Including 2.5% for Kim Moon-soo (Saenuri).)	10.4
10–12 Feb	1,515	±2.5	Realmeter	20.3	3.0	—N/a	10.3	16.4	8.6	3.5	11.7	—N/a	—N/a	26.2	3.9
1–5 Feb	2,527	±2.0	Realmeter	20.5	2.4	—N/a	8.2	17.6	7.2	4.1	13.6	—N/a	—N/a	26.4	2.9
2–4 Feb	1,003	±3.1	Gallup Korea	15	—N/a	2	9	10	8	—N/a	12	—N/a	—N/a	36	3
25–29 Jan	2,532	±1.9	Realmeter	18.8	3.2	—N/a	9.1	16.8	8.9	3.1	13.2	—N/a	—N/a	26.9	2.0
18–22 Jan	2,524	±2.0	Realmeter	20.8	2.9	—N/a	7.3	18.1	9.1	3.1	14.6	—N/a	—N/a	24.1	2.7
11–15 Jan	2,532	±2.0	Realmeter	18.9	2.6	—N/a	7.2	17.7	8.0	3.4	17.8	—N/a	—N/a	24.4	1.1
12–14 Jan	1,005	±3.1	Gallup Korea	16	—N/a	2	8	12	7	2	13	—N/a	—N/a	31	3
~8 Jan	2,518	±2.0	Realmeter	18.0	3.3	—N/a	7.5	18.3	6.1	3.1	18.1	—N/a	—N/a	25.6	0.2

=== Hypothetical polling ===
Fieldwork date	Sample size	Margin of error	Polling firm	DPK	Ind.	Saenuri	People	Bareun	Justice	Other/none/undecided	Lead
Fieldwork date	Sample size	Margin of error	Polling firm	Moon Jae-in	Ban Ki-moon	Hwang Kyo-ahn	Ahn Cheol-soo	Yoo Seong-min	Sim Sang-jung	Other/none/undecided	Lead
26–30 Dec	2,531	±2.9	Realmeter	28.9	21.3	9.0	8.8	4.9	1.2	25.9	7.6

Fieldwork date	Sample size	Margin of error	Polling firm	DPK	Ind.	People	Saenuri	Other/none/undecided	Lead
Fieldwork date	Sample size	Margin of error	Polling firm	Moon Jae-in	Ban Ki-moon	Ahn Cheol-soo	Kim Moo-sung	Other/none/undecided	Lead
12 Dec	1,009	±3.1	Time Research	41.3	24.3	13.1	—N/a	21.2	17.0
12 Dec	1,009	±3.1	Time Research	47.0	28.2	—N/a	8.0 (Note: Unspecified pro-Park Saenuri candidate.)	16.8	18.8
14–15 Nov	1,019	±3.1	Realmeter	32.7	31.5	22.8	—N/a	13.0	1.2
14–15 Nov	1,019	±3.1	Realmeter	46.2	37.6	—N/a	—N/a	16.2	8.6
14–15 Nov	1,019	±3.1	Realmeter	—N/a	37.2	39.9	—N/a	22.9	2.7
19–20 Sep	1,024	±3.1	Realmeter	30.6	38.5	18.0	—N/a	12.9	7.9
19–20 Sep	1,024	±3.1	Realmeter	38.4	46.7	—N/a	—N/a	14.9	8.3
19–20 Sep	1,024	±3.1	Realmeter	—N/a	46.3	32.5	—N/a	21.2	13.8
13–14 Jun	1,113	±2.9	Realmeter	34.9	36.5	19.0	—N/a	9.6	1.6
13–14 Jun	1,113	±2.9	Realmeter	44.9	44.2	—N/a	—N/a	10.9	0.7
13–14 Jun	1,113	±2.9	Realmeter	—N/a	40.9	33.7	—N/a	25.4	7.2
18–19 Apr	1,012	±3.1	Realmeter	42.8	42.3	—N/a	—N/a	14.9	0.5
18–19 Apr	1,012	±3.1	Realmeter	—N/a	41.0	32.3	—N/a	26.7	8.7
14–15 Mar	1,012	±3.1	Realmeter	44.0	—N/a	—N/a	45.0	11.0	1.0
14–15 Mar	1,012	±3.1	Realmeter	—N/a	—N/a	37.2	44.2	18.6	7.0
17–19 Feb	1,014	±3.1	Realmeter	44.3	—N/a	—N/a	45.0	10.7	0.7
17–19 Feb	1,014	±3.1	Realmeter	—N/a	—N/a	37.7	43.8	18.5	6.1
11–13 Jan	1,022	±3.1	Realmeter	41.0	—N/a	—N/a	46.0	13.0	5.0
11–13 Jan	1,022	±3.1	Realmeter	—N/a	—N/a	41.8	41.0	17.2	0.8

== 2015 ==
Fieldwork date	Sample size	Margin of error	Polling firm	NPAD					Saenuri									Justice	Other/none/undecided	Lead
Fieldwork date	Sample size	Margin of error	Polling firm	Moon Jae-in	Ahn Cheol-soo	Park Won-soon	Ahn Hee-jung	Lee Jae-myung	Kim Moo-sung	Oh Se-hoon	Yoo Seong-min	Hong Joon-pyo	Kim Moon-soo	Chung Mong-joon	Nam Kyung-pil	Lee Wan-koo	Won Hee-ryong	Sim Sang-jung	Other/none/undecided	Lead
28–30 Dec	1,634	±2.4	Realmeter	20.2	14.6	9.7	3.1	—N/a	19.4	6.5	4.3	3.0	2.3	2.3	1.8	—N/a	—N/a	1.6	11.2	0.8
28 Dec	NPAD rebrands to the Democratic Party.																			
21–24 Dec	2,050	±2.2	Realmeter	17.6	16.5	9.1	4.2	—N/a	17.1	6.6	3.4	2.9	3.7	2.7	—N/a	—N/a	—N/a	—N/a	16.2	0.5
21–23 Dec	1,535	±2.5	Realmeter	16.6	16.3	9.3	5.0	—N/a	17.6	6.6	2.9	3.0	3.5	2.7	2.0	—N/a	—N/a	3.4	11.1	1.0
15–16 Dec	995	±3.1	Realmeter	19.1	13.5	10.9	3.5	—N/a	20.3	6.1	3.1	2.8	3.6	2.9	1.9	—N/a	—N/a	1.5	10.8	1.2
14–16 Dec	1,682	±2.4	Realmeter	19.4	14.2	10.9	—N/a	—N/a	19.6	6.3	—N/a	—N/a	—N/a	—N/a	—N/a	—N/a	—N/a	—N/a	29.6	0.2
13 Dec	Ahn Cheol-soo leaves the NPAD.																			
7–11 Dec	2,587	±1.9	Realmeter	18.5	10.1	12.1	3.6	—N/a	21.8	5.6	3.0	3.3	3.7	3.1	—N/a	—N/a	—N/a	—N/a	15.2	3.3
8–10 Dec	1,009	±3.1	Gallup Korea	15	10	12	—N/a	2	15	6	3	—N/a	3	—N/a	—N/a	—N/a	—N/a	—N/a	34	Tie
7–9 Dec	1,548	±2.5	Realmeter	16.1	11.1	12.5	3.5	—N/a	22.5	4.8	3.4	3.6	3.1	3.8	2.3	—N/a	—N/a	1.9	11.4	6.4
30 Nov–4 Dec	2,638	±1.9	Realmeter	18.6	8.3	12.3	2.7	—N/a	20.6	7.3	3.8	3.3	5.1	3.3	2.6	—N/a	—N/a	2.1	10.0	2.0
30 Nov–2 Dec	1,571	±2.5	Realmeter	18.8	8.6	12.9	2.1	—N/a	20.4	7.5	3.7	3.0	4.3	3.8	2.1	—N/a	—N/a	2.1	10.7	1.6
23–27 Nov	2,582	±1.9	Realmeter	17.8	8.2	13.5	3.5	—N/a	19.8	7.4	4.5	2.6	3.7	3.0	1.8	—N/a	—N/a	2.8	11.3	2.0
23–25 Nov	1,520	±2.5	Realmeter	18.2	8.7	13.4	3.5	—N/a	20.1	7.9	4.4	2.6	3.8	2.9	1.2	—N/a	—N/a	2.8	10.5	1.9
16–20 Nov	2,634	±1.9	Realmeter	15.6	5.5	14.3	4.1	—N/a	20.7	8.4	4.6	2.7	3.7	3.1	2.4	—N/a	—N/a	2.4	12.5	5.1
16–18 Nov	1,606	±2.4	Realmeter	15.7	5.4	15.4	3.8	—N/a	22.2	8.2	4.3	2.6	3.2	3.7	1.9	—N/a	—N/a	2.1	11.5	6.5
9–13 Nov	2,617	±1.9	Realmeter	17.1	7.3	12.4	3.0	—N/a	21.8	7.9	3.7	2.6	3.6	3.9	1.7	—N/a	—N/a	2.5	12.5	4.7
10–12 Nov	1,012	±3.1	Gallup Korea	12	8	13	—N/a	2	13	8	3	—N/a	2	—N/a	—N/a	—N/a	—N/a	—N/a	38	Tie
9–11 Nov	1,568	±2.5	Realmeter	15.9	7.0	12.7	2.8	—N/a	22.7	7.5	4.0	2.5	3.3	3.6	1.5	—N/a	—N/a	2.8	13.7	6.8
2–6 Nov	2,561	±1.9	Realmeter	18.2	6.8	13.2	3.7	—N/a	20.8	7.1	4.1	2.5	3.2	2.5	2.4	—N/a	—N/a	2.1	13.4	2.6
2–4 Nov	1,533	±2.5	Realmeter	17.6	6.6	13.5	3.3	—N/a	21.5	6.8	4.4	2.6	3.9	3.0	2.6	—N/a	—N/a	2.0	12.2	3.9
26–30 Oct	2,644	±1.9	Realmeter	19.0	6.2	15.8	3.8	—N/a	22.5	6.3	3.7	3.0	3.8	2.5	1.5	—N/a	—N/a	1.2	10.7	3.5
26–28 Oct	1,559	±2.5	Realmeter	19.6	6.2	15.3	3.6	—N/a	23.7	6.0	3.9	2.3	3.9	2.6	1.2	—N/a	—N/a	1.2	10.5	4.1
19–23 Oct	2,584	±1.9	Realmeter	17.8	7.5	12.6	3.5	—N/a	20.9	6.9	4.5	2.8	3.8	3.2	2.3	—N/a	—N/a	2.3	11.9	3.1
19–21 Oct	1,553	±2.5	Realmeter	17.0	7.9	11.6	3.3	—N/a	21.2	7.3	—N/a	2.6	4.1	2.7	2.1	—N/a	—N/a	2.3	13.0	4.2
12–16 Oct	2,755	±1.9	Realmeter	18.6	7.8	12.4	2.9	—N/a	19.9	6.3	3.8	3.8	4.7	—N/a	2.6	—N/a	—N/a	1.6	12.5	1.3
13–15 Oct	1,003	±3.1	Gallup Korea	11	8	14	—N/a	2	13	8	3	—N/a	3	—N/a	—N/a	—N/a	—N/a	—N/a	37	1
12–14 Oct	1,500	±2.5	Realmeter	19.6	8.9	11.6	2.8	—N/a	19.9	6.0	4.2	4.2	4.2	3.2	2.4	—N/a	—N/a	1.6	11.4	0.3
5–8 Oct	2,000	±2.2	Realmeter	16.9	7.8	13.7	3.4	—N/a	18.8	6.4	3.4	3.0	4.0	2.7	2.9	—N/a	—N/a	2.0	15.0	1.9
5–7 Oct	1,500	±2.5	Realmeter	16.2	6.5	14.8	3.6	—N/a	18.3	6.5	3.2	2.6	4.3	2.5	2.8	—N/a	—N/a	2.5	16.2	2.1
29 Sep–2 Oct	2,000	±2.2	Realmeter	17.5	7.7	12.8	3.6	—N/a	21.0	4.7	3.0	2.6	5.6	2.9	2.1	—N/a	—N/a	2.9	13.6	3.5
21–24 Sep	2,000	±2.2	Realmeter	19.5	7.5	13.4	3.8	—N/a	21.5	5.3	3.6	2.7	4.7	3.5	2.0	—N/a	—N/a	1.9	10.5	2.0
14–18 Sep	2,500	±2.0	Realmeter	17.9	9.9	14.8	3.0	—N/a	19.9	6.5	3.3	2.3	5.1	3.5	2.4	—N/a	—N/a	1.1	10.3	2.0
7–11 Sep	2,500	±2.0	Realmeter	13.9	7.7	16.7	3.2	—N/a	22.1	6.3	4.6	3.0	4.1	4.3	2.7	—N/a	—N/a	1.2	10.3	5.4
8–10 Sep	1,011	±3.1	Gallup Korea	12	9	15	—N/a	3	15	6	4	—N/a	2	—N/a	—N/a	—N/a	—N/a	—N/a	34	Tie
31 Aug–4 Sep	2,500	±2.0	Realmeter	14.5	8.5	14.9	4.1	—N/a	24.1	4.5	3.2	3.3	4.9	3.9	1.9	—N/a	—N/a	1.3	11.0	9.2
24–28 Aug	2,500	±2.0	Realmeter	13.5	7.7	15.9	3.8	—N/a	24.7	5.1	3.2	3.1	5.3	3.6	2.4	—N/a	—N/a	1.0	10.7	8.8
17–21 Aug	2,500	±2.0	Realmeter	14.4	6.7	17.3	3.6	—N/a	21.8	6.6	5.0	3.1	4.0	3.0	—N/a	—N/a	—N/a	—N/a	14.5	4.5
11–13 Aug	1,005	±3.1	Gallup Korea	12	9	16	—N/a	4	15	6	2	—N/a	4	—N/a	—N/a	—N/a	—N/a	—N/a	32	1
10–13 Aug	2,000	±2.2	Realmeter	12.9	7.2	17.2	4.2	—N/a	21.8	5.3	4.5	2.2	5.0	3.1	—N/a	—N/a	—N/a	—N/a	16.6	4.6
3–7 Aug	2,500	±2.0	Realmeter	14.4	6.8	15.8	2.6	—N/a	24.2	5.9	5.4	2.3	4.3	—N/a	2.6	—N/a	—N/a	—N/a	15.8	8.4
27–31 Jul	2,500	±2.0	Realmeter	15.0	7.4	18.4	4.2	—N/a	21.2	4.6	5.4	3.0	3.7	—N/a	2.4	—N/a	—N/a	—N/a	14.9	2.8
20–24 Jul	2,500	±2.0	Realmeter	13.6	8.6	15.8	3.2	—N/a	24.0	—N/a	5.7	4.3	4.0	4.6	2.8	—N/a	—N/a	—N/a	13.4	8.2
13–17 Jul	2,500	±2.0	Realmeter	14.9	7.5	18.4	3.5	—N/a	22.9	—N/a	6.3	2.6	3.8	4.0	2.3	—N/a	—N/a	—N/a	13.7	4.5
6–10 Jul	2,500	±2.0	Realmeter	17.4	7.5	18.4	4.0	—N/a	20.8	—N/a	—N/a	3.1	5.2	5.2	3.0	—N/a	—N/a	—N/a	15.4	2.4
7–9 Jul	1,001	±3.1	Gallup Korea	12	9	17	—N/a	3	13	8	—N/a	—N/a	3	4	—N/a	—N/a	—N/a	—N/a	29	4
29 Jun–3 Jul	2,500	±2.0	Realmeter	15.5	6.9	19.6	4.0	—N/a	21.3	—N/a	—N/a	3.4	4.9	3.8	3.1	—N/a	—N/a	—N/a	17.5	1.7
22–26 Jun	2,500	±2.0	Realmeter	15.6	6.6	22.1	4.2	—N/a	20.9	—N/a	—N/a	4.0	4.8	3.8	2.9	—N/a	—N/a	—N/a	15.1	1.2
18 Jun	Hwang Kyo-ahn (independent) is appointed Prime Minister.																			
15–19 Jun	2,500	±2.0	Realmeter	15.6	7.6	22.5	3.8	—N/a	20.1	—N/a	—N/a	2.9	4.4	3.7	3.0	—N/a	—N/a	—N/a	16.4	2.4
8–12 Jun	2,500	±2.0	Realmeter	17.5	8.0	19.9	4.2	—N/a	19.5	—N/a	—N/a	3.2	5.2	4.0	3.0	—N/a	—N/a	—N/a	15.6	0.4
9–11 Jun	1,002	±3.1	Gallup Korea	13	8	17	—N/a	2	13	6	—N/a	—N/a	4	4	—N/a	—N/a	—N/a	—N/a	33	4
1–5 Jun	2,500	±2.0	Realmeter	18.3	7.9	13.8	4.0	—N/a	23.3	—N/a	—N/a	3.1	5.8	3.0	2.1	—N/a	—N/a	—N/a	18.8	5.0
26–29 May	2,000	±2.2	Realmeter	18.3	7.7	13.4	4.4	—N/a	24.2	—N/a	—N/a	4.1	6.8	4.1	3.7	—N/a	—N/a	—N/a	13.3	5.9
18–22 May	2,500	±2.0	Realmeter	19.5	6.3	14.6	3.6	—N/a	22.2	—N/a	—N/a	3.5	6.7	4.5	2.8	—N/a	—N/a	—N/a	16.1	2.7
11–15 May	2,500	±2.0	Realmeter	19.6	7.9	12.9	4.3	—N/a	21.2	—N/a	—N/a	3.1	6.5	4.6	3.3	—N/a	—N/a	—N/a	16.6	1.6
12–14 May	1,001	±3.1	Gallup Korea	15	10	11	—N/a	—N/a	12	7	—N/a	—N/a	6	4	—N/a	—N/a	—N/a	—N/a	37 (Note: Including 4% for Sohn Hak-kyu (NPAD).)	3
4–8 May	2,000	±2.2	Realmeter	22.5	7.8	10.3	3.0	—N/a	22.6	—N/a	—N/a	3.8	4.5	3.5	2.5	1.9	1.3	—N/a	16.2	0.1
27 Apr–1 May	2,500	±2.0	Realmeter	24.8	6.9	10.8	3.2	—N/a	19.2	—N/a	—N/a	4.6	5.4	3.2	2.7	2.6	1.1	—N/a	15.4	5.6
29 Apr	Four by-elections are held for the National Assembly.																			
27 Apr	Lee Wan-koo (Saenuri) resigns as Prime Minister.																			
20–24 Apr	2,500	±2.0	Realmeter	26.7	7.4	10.7	4.7	—N/a	13.5	—N/a	—N/a	3.4	5.4	4.6	3.0	2.6	1.7	—N/a	16.3	13.2
13–17 Apr	2,500	±2.0	Realmeter	27.9	5.6	9.9	3.9	—N/a	13.2	—N/a	—N/a	4.0	4.6	5.5	3.8	3.7	1.3	—N/a	16.5	14.7
6–10 Apr	2,500	±2.0	Realmeter	27.5	6.4	11.3	3.8	—N/a	10.7	—N/a	—N/a	5.4	4.4	3.6	3.2	7.0	1.6	—N/a	15.0	16.2
7–9 Apr	1,006	±3.1	Gallup Korea	22	11	12	—N/a	1	9	—N/a	—N/a	5	4	—N/a	—N/a	4	—N/a	—N/a	32	10
30 Mar–3 Apr	2,500	±2.0	Realmeter	23.8	7.4	9.0	4.2	—N/a	12.7	—N/a	—N/a	5.8	5.6	5.1	3.6	7.1	—N/a	—N/a	15.7	11.1
23–27 Mar	2,500	±2.0	Realmeter	25.3	7.7	9.9	4.2	—N/a	11.9	—N/a	—N/a	5.3	4.7	5.0	3.5	7.7	—N/a	—N/a	14.6	13.4
16–20 Mar	2,500	±2.0	Realmeter	24.9	6.8	11.5	3.6	—N/a	11.8	—N/a	—N/a	6.0	5.3	4.8	3.0	7.9	—N/a	—N/a	14.4	13.1
9–13 Mar	2,500	±2.0	Realmeter	24.0	7.4	10.3	3.7	—N/a	10.8	—N/a	—N/a	5.7	6.3	6.6	3.9	8.0	—N/a	—N/a	13.3	13.2
10–12 Mar	1,005	±3.1	Gallup Korea	24	8	12	—N/a	—N/a	8	7	—N/a	—N/a	5	—N/a	—N/a	—N/a	—N/a	—N/a	36	12
2–6 Mar	2,500	±2.0	Realmeter	24.5	7.2	10.9	3.2	—N/a	13.1	—N/a	—N/a	4.5	6.4	6.5	3.0	6.7	—N/a	—N/a	14.0	11.4
23–27 Feb	2,500	±2.0	Realmeter	27.0	6.8	11.6	4.1	—N/a	11.8	—N/a	—N/a	3.8	4.9	6.2	2.7	6.4	—N/a	—N/a	14.7	15.2
17 Feb	Lee Wan-koo (Saenuri) is appointed Prime Minister.																			
16–17 Feb	1,000	±3.1	Realmeter	27.5	8.2	11.2	4.6	—N/a	9.0	—N/a	—N/a	4.1	6.0	6.1	2.3	5.7	—N/a	—N/a	15.5	16.3
9–13 Feb	2,500	±2.0	Realmeter	25.2	7.3	12.9	3.7	—N/a	11.6	—N/a	—N/a	5.1	6.0	6.4	4.2	4.9	—N/a	—N/a	12.7	12.3
10–12 Feb	1,010	±3.1	Gallup Korea	25	11	11	—N/a	—N/a	10	—N/a	—N/a	—N/a	5	—N/a	—N/a	3	—N/a	—N/a	35	14
8 February	Moon Jae-in is elected leader of the NPAD.																			
2–6 Feb	2,500	±2.0	Realmeter	18.5	7.4	13.3	3.7	—N/a	11.2	—N/a	—N/a	4.7	6.6	6.3	3.7	7.5	—N/a	—N/a	17.2	5.2
26–30 Jan	2,500	±2.0	Realmeter	17.5	9.2	14.6	4.6	—N/a	9.7	—N/a	—N/a	4.5	4.9	6.3	3.8	7.9	—N/a	—N/a	16.9	2.9
19–23 Jan	2,500	±2.0	Realmeter	16.7	8.1	16.0	5.7	—N/a	13.2	—N/a	—N/a	6.4	5.8	6.1	3.7	—N/a	—N/a	—N/a	18.4	0.7
12–16 Jan	2,500	±2.0	Realmeter	15.5	8.0	14.4	5.8	—N/a	11.5	—N/a	—N/a	7.4	6.5	5.6	3.1	—N/a	—N/a	—N/a	22.3	1.1
13–15 Jan	1,002	±3.1	Gallup Korea	15	12	14	—N/a	—N/a	9	—N/a	—N/a	—N/a	5	5	—N/a	—N/a	—N/a	—N/a	40	1
5–9 Jan	2,500	±2.0	Realmeter	15.0	8.8	15.0	4.1	—N/a	11.2	—N/a	—N/a	6.9	8.0	6.2	3.7	—N/a	—N/a	—N/a	21.1	Tie
29 Dec–2 Jan	2,000	±2.2	Realmeter	16.2	6.4	18.1	4.4	—N/a	12.2	—N/a	—N/a	7.4	7.1	4.3	3.8	—N/a	—N/a	—N/a	19.9	1.9

== 2014 ==
Fieldwork date	Sample size	Margin of error	Polling firm	NPAD						Saenuri						Other/none/undecided	Lead
Fieldwork date	Sample size	Margin of error	Polling firm	Moon Jae-in	Park Won-soon	Ahn Cheol-soo	Ahn Hee-jung	Park Young-sun	Sohn Hak-kyu	Kim Moo-sung	Kim Moon-soo	Hong Joon-pyo	Chung Mong-joon	Nam Kyung-pil	Oh Se-hoon	Other/none/undecided	Lead
22–26 Dec	2,000	±2.2	Realmeter	16.3	14.6	7.7	3.6	—N/a	—N/a	12.7	7.6	7.5	5.0	4.0	—N/a	21.0	1.7
15–19 Dec	2,500	±2.0	Realmeter	14.8	17.8	8.4	4.8	—N/a	—N/a	12.0	7.3	6.3	5.6	3.5	—N/a	19.5	3.0
8–12 Dec	2,500	±2.0	Realmeter	15.4	15.5	8.4	5.8	—N/a	—N/a	12.5	7.7	5.7	6.1	3.6	—N/a	19.3	0.1
9–11 Dec	1,005	±3.1	Gallup Korea	13	18	7	3	—N/a	—N/a	7	6	4	6	—N/a	—N/a	35	5
1–5 Dec	2,500	±2.0	Realmeter	13.9	18.1	7.4	4.3	—N/a	—N/a	12.1	7.6	7.4	6.3	4.8	—N/a	18.1	4.2
24–28 Nov	2,500	±2.0	Realmeter	14.4	17.9	6.7	4.0	—N/a	—N/a	13.0	8.3	7.6	5.5	3.0	—N/a	19.3	3.5
17–21 Nov	2,500	±2.0	Realmeter	13.6	17.0	7.2	4.4	—N/a	—N/a	12.2	8.4	4.8	7.8	3.3	—N/a	21.3	3.4
10–14 Nov	2,500	±2.0	Realmeter	13.9	18.3	6.3	5.1	—N/a	—N/a	13.5	7.9	7.4	6.1	3.0	—N/a	18.4	4.4
11–13 Nov	1,002	±3.1	Gallup Korea	13	17	7	3	—N/a	—N/a	8	5	—N/a	6	—N/a	—N/a	41 (Note: Including 2% for Lee Wan-koo (Saenuri).)	4
3–7 Nov	2,500	±2.0	Realmeter	12.1	17.5	7.8	4.0	—N/a	—N/a	12.7	7.4	6.4	6.7	3.6	—N/a	21.8	4.8
27–31 Oct	2,500	±2.0	Realmeter	11.5	20.0	7.9	4.3	—N/a	—N/a	12.7	8.0	5.0	6.8	3.9	—N/a	20.0	7.3
20–24 Oct	2,500	±2.0	Realmeter	11.4	20.6	8.0	3.9	—N/a	—N/a	12.8	7.9	4.5	6.7	4.3	—N/a	19.9	7.8
13–17 Oct	2,500	±2.0	Realmeter	13.2	18.1	7.5	4.9	—N/a	—N/a	15.7	7.7	4.9	7.1	2.6	—N/a	17.5	2.4
14–16 Oct	1,021	±3.1	Gallup Korea	13	19	8	2	—N/a	—N/a	10	6	—N/a	6	—N/a	—N/a	36 (Note: Including 1% for Lee Wan-koo (Saenuri).)	6
6–10 Oct	2,000	±2.2	Realmeter	12.6	20.1	6.4	3.4	—N/a	—N/a	16.7	8.5	4.2	6.8	3.5	—N/a	17.8	3.4
29 Sep–2 Oct	2,000	±2.2	Realmeter	12.9	16.4	6.3	3.2	—N/a	—N/a	18.5	7.9	4.0	7.7	3.1	—N/a	20.0	2.1
22–26 Sep	2,500	±2.0	Realmeter	12.1	19.3	8.6	2.5	—N/a	—N/a	15.9	8.5	4.0	7.8	2.3	—N/a	19.0	3.4
15–19 Sep	2,500	±2.0	Realmeter	13.0	20.1	7.9	2.8	—N/a	—N/a	15.8	7.3	4.1	8.4	2.7	—N/a	18.1	4.3
16–18 Sep	1,002	±3.1	Gallup Korea	13	22	8	3	—N/a	—N/a	10	5	4	6	—N/a	—N/a	29	9
10–12 Sep	1,500	±2.5	Realmeter	14.8	18.9	7.6	3.0	1.5	—N/a	18.6	7.7	—N/a	9.9	2.9	—N/a	15.2	0.3
1–5 Sep	2,500	±2.0	Realmeter	14.3	18.6	5.7	3.7	1.7	—N/a	17.7	6.5	—N/a	9.6	2.9	—N/a	19.4	0.9
25–29 Aug	2,500	±2.0	Realmeter	15.3	16.7	7.0	3.2	1.8	—N/a	17.6	7.8	—N/a	9.7	3.0	—N/a	17.9	0.9
18–22 Aug	2,500	±2.0	Realmeter	13.7	17.7	7.7	3.3	2.1	—N/a	16.8	7.7	—N/a	8.9	2.6	—N/a	19.5	0.9
19–21 Aug	1,002	±3.1	Gallup Korea	14	17	9	2	—N/a	—N/a	13	6	—N/a	6	—N/a	—N/a	33	3
11–15 Aug	2,500	±2.0	Realmeter	13.8	18.4	8.0	4.0	1.7	—N/a	16.3	6.7	—N/a	9.1	4.6	—N/a	17.4	2.1
4–8 Aug	2,500	±2.0	Realmeter	15.3	15.4	8.6	3.9	1.4	—N/a	16.2	7.2	—N/a	9.3	4.2	—N/a	18.5	0.8
31 Jul	NPAD co-leaders Ahn Cheol-soo and Kim Han-gil resign following by-election losses.																
30 Jul	Fifteen by-elections are held for the National Assembly.																
28 Jul–1 Aug	2,500	±2.0	Realmeter	14.0	16.2	10.4	3.5	—N/a	3.9	14.5	6.9	—N/a	9.7	5.6	—N/a	19.2	1.7
21–25 Jul	2,500	±2.0	Realmeter	15.5	15.2	10.7	3.6	—N/a	2.8	13.4	7.1	—N/a	10.3	4.7	—N/a	16.7	0.3
14–18 Jul	2,500	±2.0	Realmeter	12.8	17.5	9.8	3.2	—N/a	3.3	11.9	8.3	—N/a	11.1	4.8	—N/a	17.3	4.7
14 Jul	Kim Moo-sung is elected leader of the Saenuri Party.																
7–11 Jul	2,500	±2.0	Realmeter	13.3	17.1	11.8	3.9	—N/a	3.6	7.0	8.4	—N/a	11.6	4.8	—N/a	18.5	3.8
30 Jun–4 Jul	2,500	±2.0	Realmeter	15.5	16.2	11.0	2.9	—N/a	3.3	7.8	9.1	—N/a	12.3	5.4	—N/a	16.5	0.7
23–27 Jun	2,500	±2.0	Realmeter	15.8	18.5	10.9	3.1	—N/a	3.4	7.7	7.3	—N/a	11.6	6.0	—N/a	15.7	2.7
16–20 Jun	2,500	±2.0	Realmeter	16.7	17.5	11.6	4.4	—N/a	3.6	7.2	6.4	—N/a	10.9	6.6	—N/a	15.1	0.8
9–13 Jun	2,500	±2.0	Realmeter	15.9	18.7	11.2	4.4	—N/a	2.9	7.9	6.1	—N/a	12.5	6.6	—N/a	13.8	2.8
4 Jun	The 2014 local elections take place.																
26–30 May	2,549	±1.9	Realmeter	15.7	12.7	11.6	—N/a	—N/a	4.0	7.5	5.5	—N/a	17.8	—N/a	3.7	21.5	2.1
19–23 May	2,565	±1.9	Realmeter	15.3	14.0	11.5	—N/a	—N/a	4.3	6.0	4.9	—N/a	18.6	—N/a	3.3	22.1	3.3
12–16 May	2,535	±1.9	Realmeter	14.2	11.7	12.3	—N/a	—N/a	4.1	5.6	3.5	—N/a	21.1	—N/a	4.3	23.2	6.9
7–9 May	1,506	±2.5	Realmeter	15.0	12.1	15.4	—N/a	—N/a	3.9	5.4	5.4	—N/a	15.9	—N/a	3.7	23.2	0.5
28 Apr–2 May	2,027	±2.2	Realmeter	12.6	8.6	16.0	—N/a	—N/a	4.2	6.4	3.5	—N/a	18.4	—N/a	3.3	27.0	2.4
21–25 Apr	2,520	±2.0	Realmeter	11.8	9.0	12.8	—N/a	—N/a	4.3	7.2	3.4	—N/a	22.3	—N/a	4.0	25.2	9.5
14–18 Apr	2,500	±2.0	Realmeter	10.3	8.2	14.6	—N/a	—N/a	3.9	7.8	4.8	—N/a	24.2	—N/a	—N/a	26.2	9.6
7–11 Apr	2,500	±2.0	Realmeter	10.4	8.0	14.9	—N/a	—N/a	—N/a	7.4	5.1	—N/a	23.2	—N/a	4.9	26.1	8.3
31 Mar–1 Apr	2,500	±2.0	Realmeter	11.6	8.0	15.7	—N/a	—N/a	—N/a	7.5	4.7	—N/a	21.8	—N/a	4.2	26.5	6.1
24–28 Mar	2,500	±2.0	Realmeter	12.6	8.4	14.8	—N/a	—N/a	4.3	7.3	6.3	—N/a	22.0	—N/a	—N/a	24.3	7.2
26 Mar	The Democratic Party and Ahn Cheol-soo's New Political Vision committee merge to form the NPAD.																

Fieldwork date	Sample size	Margin of error	Polling firm	NPAD			Saenuri			Ind.	Other/none/undecided	Lead
Fieldwork date	Sample size	Margin of error	Polling firm	Moon Jae-in	Park Won-soon	Sohn Hak-kyu	Chung Mong-joon	Kim Moo-sung	Kim Moon-soo	Ahn Cheol-soo	Other/none/undecided	Lead
17–21 Mar	2,500	±2.0	Realmeter	11.2	8.4	4.2	20.5	7.9	5.1	17.3	25.4	3.2
10–14 Mar	2,500	±2.0	Realmeter	11.4	8.9	3.8	18.8	8.0	4.7	17.1	27.3	1.7
