= 2018 Bareunmirae Party leadership election =

Party election in South Korea

- 2 September 2018
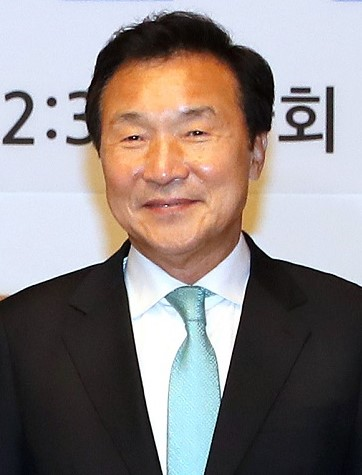

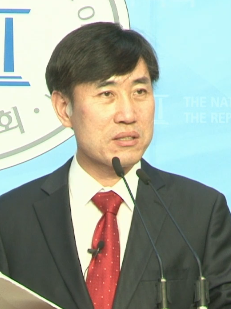

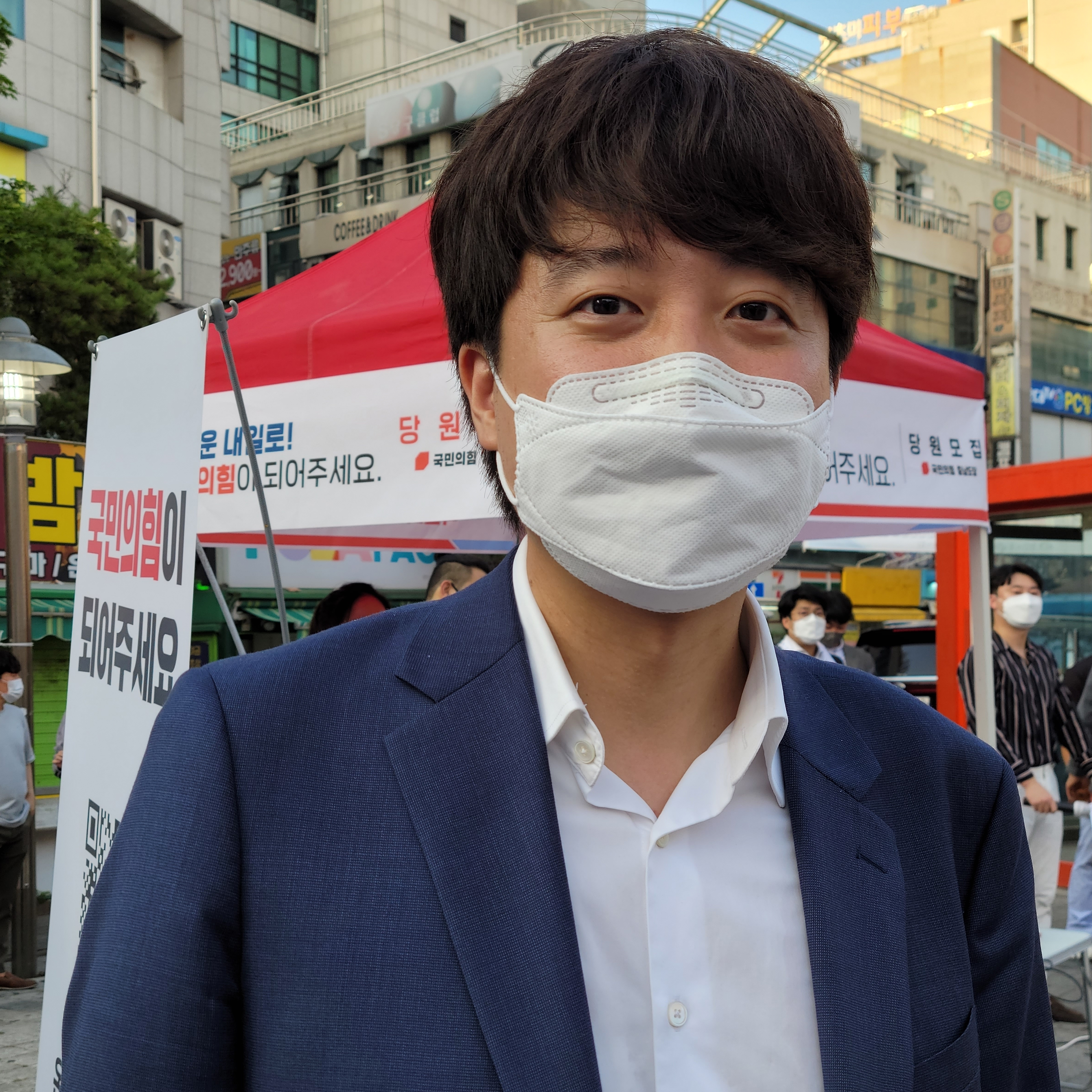
| Candidate | Sohn Hak-kyu | Ha Tae-keung | Lee Jun-seok |
| Delegate count | 53.74% | 45.36% | 39.00% |
| Opinion poll | 57.50% | 45.28% | 38.24% |
| Total | 54.04% | 45.72% | 36.92% |
President before election
Kim Dong-cheol (Interim)
Elected President
Sohn Hak-kyu

On 2 September 2018, Bareunmirae Party held a leadership election.

== Background ==
This was a snap election called after the resignation of both Yoo Seong-min and Park Joo-sun due to the serious defeat in local elections in 2018. Until the new leadership election, the party's presidency was temporarily taken by Kim Dong-cheol, party's parliamentary leader.

== Candidates ==
=== Official candidates ===
- Ha Tae-keung
- Chung Woon-cheon
- Kim Young-hwan
- Sohn Hak-kyu
- Lee Jun-seok
- Kwon Eun-hui

=== Withdrawn candidates ===
Below are candidates lost in primary on 11 August.

- Shin Yong-hyun
- Chang Song-min
- Chang Song-chol
- Lee Su-bong

== Results ==
| No. | Candidate | Votes | Opinion polls | Total results | Position |
|---|---|---|---|---|---|
| 04 | Sohn Hak-kyu | 24,605 (53.74%) | 57.50% | 54.04% | President |
| 01 | Ha Tae-keung | 20,285 (45.36%) | 45.28% | 45.72% | Vice President |
| 05 | Lee Jun-seok | 17,538 (39.00%) | 38.24% | 36.92% | Vice President |
| 02 | Chung Woon-cheon | 11,237 (24.41%) | 24.90% | 24.26% | |
| 03 | Kim Young-hwan | 10,320 (23.47%) | 22.22% | 23.62% | |
| 06 | Kwon Eun-hui | 6,611 (14.04%) | 14.22% | 13.70% | Vice President |

Sohn Hak-kyu, former Governor of Gyeonggi Province, won as the President. Incumbent MP Ha Tae-keung and entrepreneur Lee Jun-seok that came behind of Sohn, became Vice Presidents. Kwon Eun-hui, despite ended as the 6th and the last, automatically took vice presidency specialised for women.

Other than that, Kim Soo-min, an incumbent MP, was elected as the party's Youth Chief.
