= Jung Tae-ho =

South Korean politician

- 정태호

Chair of Strategy and Planning Committee of the Democratic Party
- In office 9 September 2020 – May 2021
- Leader: Lee Nak-yon
- Preceded by: Jin Sung-joon

Member of the National Assembly
- Incumbent
- Assumed office 30 May 2020
- Preceded by: Oh Shin-hwan
- Constituency: Seoul Gwanak B

Senior Secretary to the President for Job Creation
- In office 27 June 2018 – 26 July 2019
- President: Moon Jae-in
- Preceded by: Bahn Jahng-shick
- Succeeded by: Hwang Duk-soon

Secretary to the President for Policy Planning
- In office 29 May 2017 – 26 July 2018
- President: Moon Jae-in
- Preceded by: Position established

Personal details
- Born: 23 January 1964 (age 62)
- Party: Democratic
- Education: Seoul National University; University at Albany, SUNY

Jung Tae-ho (Korean: 정태호; Hanja: 鄭泰浩;born 23 January 1964) is a South Korean politician representing Gwanak District of Seoul at the National Assembly from 2020 and previously served as a secretary and later a senior secretary to President Moon Jae-in from 2017 to 2019.

== Early political career ==
During his undergraduate studies, he led his university branch of student-organised group calling for the U.S. to stop providing legitimacy to authoritarian Chun Doo-hwan regime as its deputy head. After spending over two years in jail for this, he was pardoned. However, he later spent another year in jail for organising labour activism movement.

== Political career ==
Jung first entered politics in 1990 when he was employed as one of secretaries to then-parliamentarian Lee Hae-chan. He continued working for Lee when Lee became the Deputy Mayor of Seoul in 1995. In 1997 he joined transition team of then-President-elect Kim Dae-jung as one of administrators. In 2001 he mapped 150 campaign policy promises of Kim's successor, Roh Moo-hyun. After working at Roh's transition team in 2003, he continued working for Roh til 2007 during which he took numerous roles such as his secretary for planning political affairs, policy coordination, planning and coordination and political affairs. He shortly served as his spokesperson in 2006.

In 2015 he stood for the constituency previously held by Lee Hae-chan from its creation in 1988 to 2008 and liberal politician from 2008. However, Chung Dong-young joined the race effectively splitting the votes among liberal voters resulted in electing Oh Shin-hwan from the opposition party. In 2016 general election, Jung lost to Oh again for the similar reason as Lee Haeng-ja (Korean: 이행자) from People's Party Chung co-founded joined the race.

In 2017 Jung joined then-presidential candidate Moon Jae-in's campaign as his director of policy situation room responsible of mapping Moon's 100 campaign policy promises. After Moon was elected, Jung was appointed as his Secretary for Policy Planning, one of three secretary-level positions in the Office of the President considered as comparable to Senior Presidential Secretaries. He coordinated socio-economic issues with three senior secretaries at the office of Chief Presidential Secretary for Policy. Jung previously took similar role under President Roh Moo-hyun.

A year later, he was promoted to vice-ministerial-level Senior Presidential Secretary for Jobs Creation. His major achievement includes "Gwangju and Gumi models" which he mediated with local governments, trade union representatives, Hyundai Motors and LG Chem. These models resemble Auto 5000 as they secure the manufacturing jobs in the country by providing their workers benefits and social infrastructure for reduced wages.

Another year later, he resigned for the upcoming general election. In 2020 general election where two major parties absolutely dominated constituency races all across the country, Jung was elected receiving the majority of votes cast. In June 2020 Jung was appointed by then-party leader Lee Hae-chan as a standing deputy chair of its Policy Planning Committee and a month later a director of the planning team of its K-New Deal Committee. In September 2020 newly elected leader of his party, Lee Nak-yon, appointed him to the same post in K-New Deal Committee and as the chair of Strategy and Planning Committee.

== Education ==
Jung holds two degrees - a bachelor in social welfare from Seoul National University and a Master of Public Administration and Policy from University at Albany, SUNY.

== Electoral history ==
Election	Year	District	Party affiliation	Votes	Percentage of votes	Results
2015 By-election	2015	Seoul Gwanak B	New Politics Alliance for Democracy	26,427	34.20%	Lost (2nd)
20th National Assembly General Election	2016	Seoul Gwanak B	Democratic Party of Korea	44,593	36.35%	Lost (2nd)
21st National Assembly General Election	2020	Seoul Gwanak B	Democratic Party of Korea	72,531	53.90%	Won
22nd National Assembly General Election	2024	Seoul Gwanak B	Democratic Party of Korea	73,771	57.97%	Won
