= Yu Seung-min =

Yu Seung-min, Yu Sŭng-min (유승민), Ryu Seung-min, or Ryu Sŭng-min (류승민) may refer to:

- Yoo Seong-min (born 1958), South Korean politician
- Ryu Seung-min (born 1982), South Korean table tennis player
