= Park Joo-sun =

South Korean politician (born 1949)

- 박주선
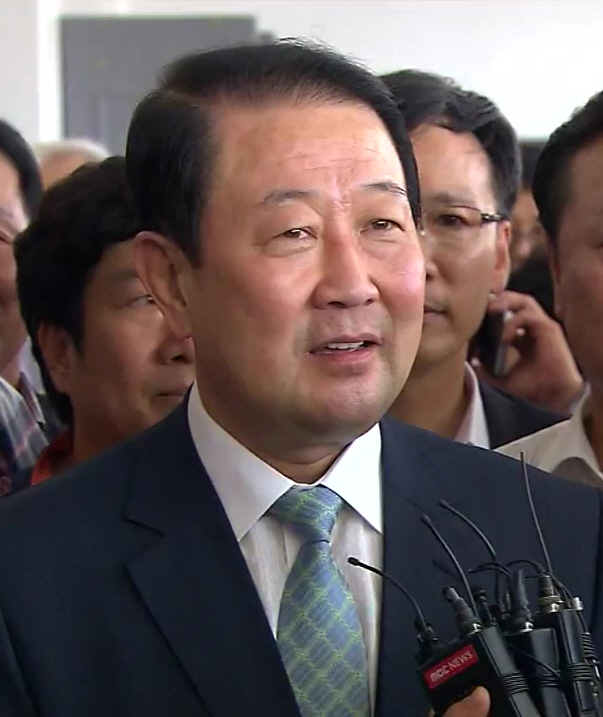

Leader of the Bareunmirae Party
- In office 13 February 2018 – 15 June 2018 Serving with Yoo Seong-min (until 14 June 2018)
- Preceded by: Position established
- Succeeded by: Kim Dong-cheol (Interim); Sohn Hak-kyu

Personal details
- Born: 23 July 1949 (age 77) South Korea
- Party: Independent

Korean name
- Hangul: 박주선
- RR: Bak Juseon
- MR: Pak Chusŏn

Park Joo-sun (Korean: 박주선, born 23 July 1949) is a South Korean politician in Bareunmirae Party who was the president of the party along with Yoo Seong-min, and the Second Deputy Speaker of the National Assembly.

== Biography ==
Born at Boseong County, South Jeolla Province. Before he entered to politics, he worked as a prosecutor.

== Political life ==
His political career was started by ex-president Kim Dae-jung, in 1998. He was willing to run as one of the parliament members of Millennium Democratic Party in 2000, however, failed at the primary, so he ran as independent and finally won.

In 2016, he joined for newly-formed People's Party and also won at the new parliamentary election. As People's Party became the 3rd party, he was elected as the Second Deputy Speaker of the Parliament, whereas Shim Jae-chul as the First.

On 14 March 2017, just 4 days after the president Park Geun-hye was impeached from the office, he declared to run for the president. He became one of the candidates for the party's primary, but defeated by Ahn Cheol-soo.

In 2018, he was elected as the president of newly-formed Bareunmirae Party, along with Yoo Seong-min. He was formerly categorised as pro-DJ but not really, although he was expected to join for Party for Democracy and Peace. On the other hand, his choice was Bareunmirae Party and left from pro-DJs.

== Election results ==
| Year | Elections | Constituency | Political party | Votes (%) | Results |
|---|---|---|---|---|---|
| 2000 | 16th National Assembly General Election | Boseong–Hwasun (South Jeolla) | Independent | 46,484 (59.92%) | Won |
| 2004 | 17th National Assembly General Election | Goheung–Boseong (South Jeolla) | Independent | 23,876 (29.73%) | Defeated (3rd) |
| 2008 | 18th National Assembly General Election | Dong (Gwangju) | UDP | 34,625 (88.74%) | Won |
| 2012 | 19th National Assembly General Election | Dong (Gwangju) | Independent | 15,372 (31.55%) | Won |
| 2016 | 20th National Assembly General Election | Dong–Nam B (Gwangju) | People's | 43,190 (54.70%) | Won |
| 2020 | 21st National Assembly General Election | Dong–Nam B (Gwangju) | Minsaeng | 8,613 (10.10%) | Defeated (3rd) |

=== Local elections ===
==== Mayor of Seoul ====
| Year | Elections | Constituency | Political party | Votes (%) | Remarks |
|---|---|---|---|---|---|
| 2006 | 4th Iocal Election | Seoul (Mayoral Elections) | Democratic | 304,565 (7.71%) | Defeated (3rd) |
