= Wansan District =

Coordinates: 35.812166°N 127.119781°E

- Non-autonomous District
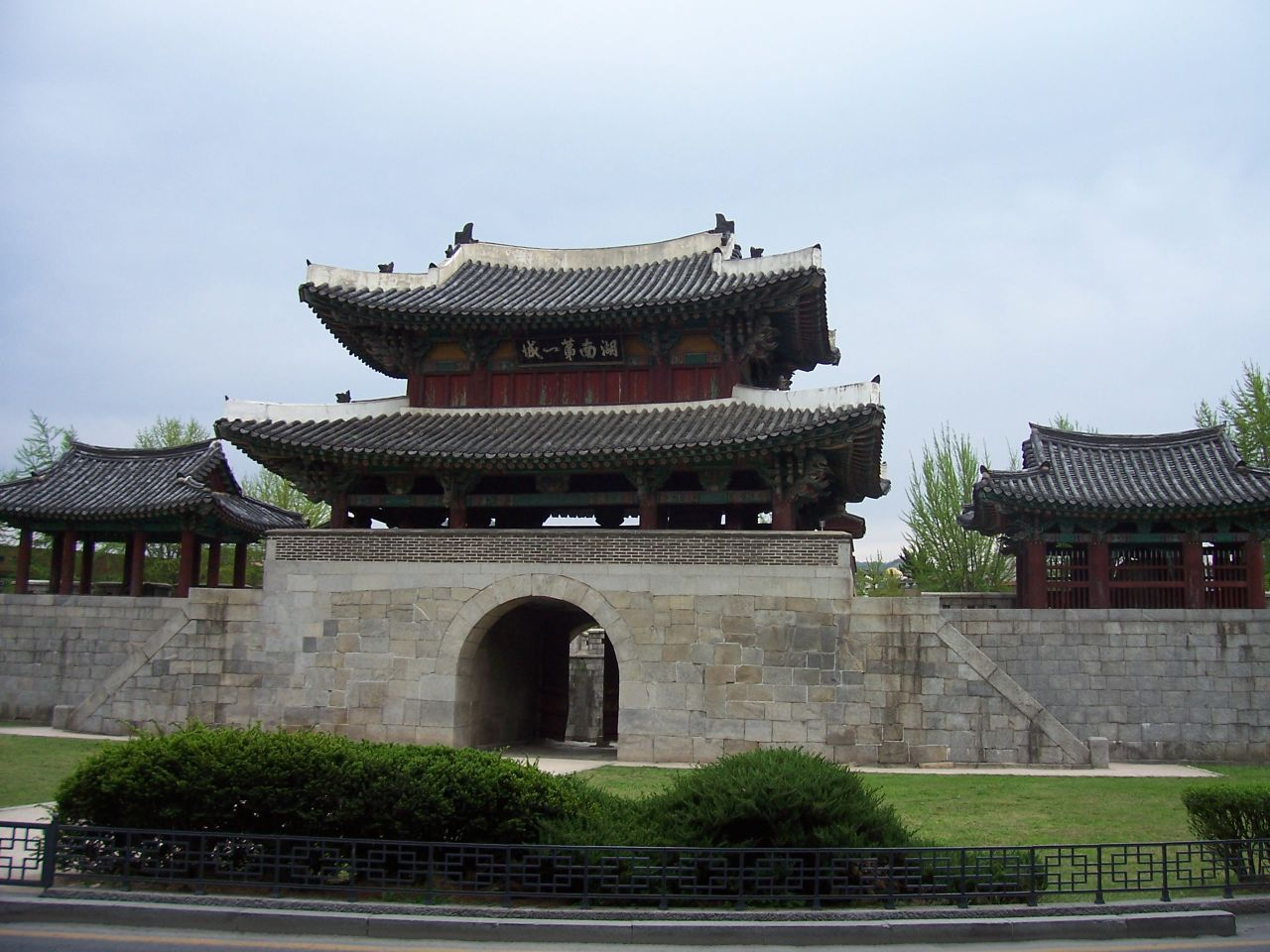
- Pungnammun

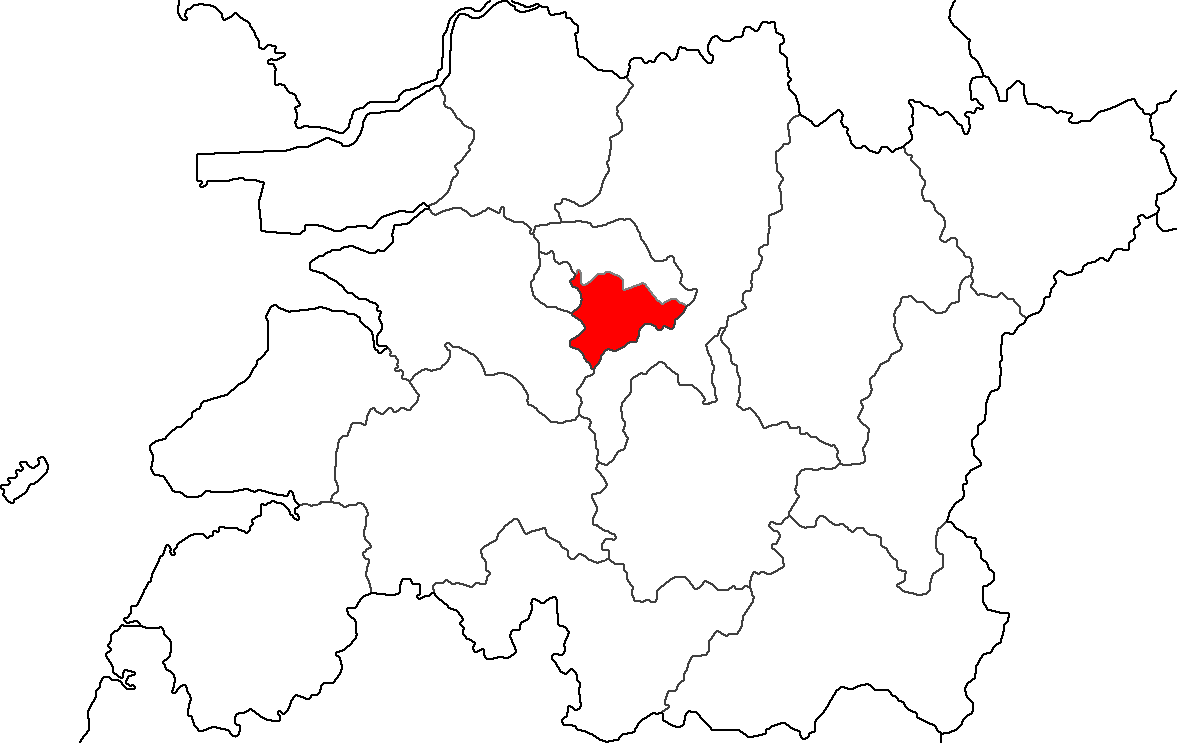
- Country: South Korea
- State: Jeonbuk
- City: Jeonju
- Administrative divisions: 18 dong

Area
  - Total: 95.1 km^{2} (36.7 sq mi)

Population (2012.12)
  - Total: 363,986
  - Density: 3,827/km^{2} (9,910/sq mi)
  - Dialect: Jeolla
- Website: Wansan-gu Office

Korean name
- Hangul: 완산구
- Hanja: 完山區
- RR: Wansan-gu
- MR: Wansan-gu

Wansan District (Korean: 완산구) is a non-autonomous district of Jeonju, North Jeolla Province, South Korea.

== Administrative divisions ==
Wansan District is divided into 18 neighbourhoods (dong).

	Hangul	Hanja
Jungang-dong	중앙동	中央洞
Pungnam-dong	풍남동	豊南洞
Nosong-dong	노송동	老松洞
Wansan-dong	완산동	完山洞
Dongseohak-dong	동서학동	東棲鶴洞
Seoseohak-dong	서서학동	西棲鶴洞
Junghwasan-dong	중화산1동	中華山洞
Junghwasan-dong	중화산2동	中華山洞
Seosin-dong	서신동	西新洞
Pyeonghwa-dong	평화1동	平和洞
Pyeonghwa-dong	평화2동	平和洞
Samcheon-dong	삼천1동	三川洞
Samcheon-dong	삼천2동	三川洞
Samcheon-dong	삼천3동	三川洞
Hyoja-dong	효자1동	孝子洞
Hyoja-dong	효자2동	孝子洞
Hyoja-dong	효자3동	孝子洞
Hyoja-dong	효자4동	孝子洞

== See also ==
- Deokjin District
