= Auto 5000 =

Defunct German vehicle manufacturer

Auto 5000 GmbH was a German vehicle manufacturing company set up inside the Volkswagen complex in Wolfsburg.

The company was set up as a lower cost model with the aim of keeping manufacturing jobs in Germany at a time when production was moving to other areas. Key reductions in cost were a lower weekly rate of pay and more flexible working hours. The trade union IG Metall agreed the terms for newly employed staff who were either unemployed, about to be made redundant or looking to have more flexible working hours.

== Origin of the name Auto 5000 ==
The initial monthly rate of pay was 5000 Deutsche Marks and the initial number of employees was 5000 (3500 in Wolfsburg and 1500 additional jobs at Hanover) hence the company name.

== Products ==
The company manufactured the Touran (Dec 2002 to 2008) and Tiguan (2007 to 2008).

== End of project ==
In 2008 Volkswagen announced that it would end the project and from 1 January 2009 the remaining staff were transferred to the standard Volkswagen contract.
