= Ha Tae-keung =

South Korean politician (born 1968)

Ha Tae-keung MP
- 하태경
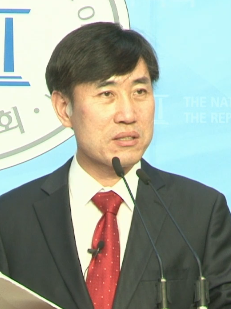
- Ha in 2020

Member of the National Assembly
- In office 30 May 2016 – 29 May 2024
- Preceded by: Bae Deok-kwang (Haeundae–Gijang A, Busan) himself (Haeundae–Gijang B, Busan)
- Succeeded by: Joo Jin-woo
- Constituency: Haeundae A (Busan)
- In office 30 May 2012 – 29 May 2016
- Preceded by: Ahn Kyung-ryul
- Succeeded by: himself (Haeundae A, Busan); Yoon Sang-jick (Gijang, Busan)
- Constituency: Haeundae–Gijang B (Busan)

President of the New Conservative Party
- In office 5 January 2020 – 17 February 2020
- Preceded by: Position established
- Succeeded by: Position abolished

Personal details
- Born: 26 April 1968 (age 58) East District, Busan, South Korea
- Citizenship: South Korean
- Party: United Future/People Power (2020-present)
- Other political affiliations: Grand National (2011–2012); Saenuri (2012–2016); Bareun (2017–2018); Bareunmirae (2018–2020); New Conservative (2020)
- Education: Jilin University
- Occupation: Activist, politician

Ha Tae-keung (Korean: 하태경, born 26 April 1968) is a South Korean activist and politician who is currently a member of National Assembly representing the 1st constituency of Haeundae District, Busan. He has served as Vice President of the Bareun Party, a Vice President of the Bareunmirae Party, and one of the co-Presidents of the New Conservative Party.

== Biography ==
Ha Tae-keung was born in Busan in 1968. During the military dictatorship of Chun Doo-hwan, Ha was a pro-democracy activist. During the early 1990s, he was a member of the National University Students Association (NUSA), which also included members Lim Soo-kyung and Im Jong-seok. Ha was detained in 1991 on charges of breaching the National Security Act. He returned to his activist career after released in 1993.

During the 2000s, Ha was interested in North Korean human rights, which he often did activism for. In 2011, Ha received Human Rights Award of Korea.

== Political career ==
In 2011, Ha joined the conservative Grand National Party (GNP), and was elected as a National Assembly representative for the party, then known as the Saenuri Party, in the 2012 South Korean legislative election. He was re-elected in 2016.

During the political scandal in 2016, Ha left the Saenuri Party and became one of the founders of the Bareun Party along with other defectors from the Saenuri Party. He ran for president of the Bareun Party in May 2017, but lost to Lee Hye-hoon. Instead, he was elected to the vice presidency. After Kim Se-yeon left the party, Ha became the party's sole Busan MP.

In 2018, the Bareun Party merged with the People Party to become the Bareunmirae Party. Ha ran for president of the Bareunmirae Party during the September 2018 leadership election, coming in 2nd place and losing to Sohn Hak-kyu. Ha instead became one of several Vice Presidents of the Bareunmirae Party.

On 5 January 2020, Ha joined seven other representatives in defecting from the Bareunmirae Party to join the New Conservative Party. Upon his defection, Ha became one of the co-Presidents of the New Conservative Party until dissolved upon its unification with the Liberty Korea Party to form the United Future Party on 17 February 2020.

In 2020, Ha was re-elected as representative of the 1st constituency of Haeundae District, Busan, as a member of the United Future Party. The party changed its name to the People Power Party later in 2020.

On 11 June 2021, Ha announced his candidacy in the 2022 South Korean presidential election as a member of the People Power Party.

== Political positions ==
Ha is politically "centre-right" who opposes extremist politics of both the far-left and the far-right. After the 2017 presidential election, he spoke in favor of the dissolving the "far-right" Liberty Korea Party (LKP) a similar manner to the 2014 banning of the "far-left" Unified Progressive Party (UPP). Ha also condemned Bareun Party representatives who returned to the LKP.

Ha is an opponent of anti-Japanese sentiment in Korea, and criticized the anti-Japanese 2019 boycott of Japanese products in South Korea.

Ha has received criticism for actions and remarks appearing to be populist, such as remarks made in 2014 defending Ilbe Storehouse.

== Election results ==
Year	Elections	Constituency	Political party	Votes (%)	Result
2012	19th National Assembly General Election	Haeundae–Gijang B (Busan)	Saenuri	42,426 (44.84%)	Won
2016	20th National Assembly General Election	Haeundae A (Busan)	Saenuri	51,197 (51.75%)	Won
2020	21st National Assembly General Election	Haeundae A (Busan)	UFP	78,971 (59.47%)	Won
