= New Conservative Party (South Korea) =

2019–2020 political party in South Korea

New Conservative Party 새로운보수당
- Leader: Yoo Seong-min
- Founded: September 30, 2019 (as Emergency Action for Change and Innovation); December 12, 2019 (as New Conservative Party)
- Dissolved: February 17, 2020
- Split from: Bareunmirae Party
- Merged into: United Future Party
- Ideology: Conservatism (South Korean)
- Political position: Centre-right to right-wing
- Colours: Sky blue

Party flag

Website
- www.newbosu.com

The New Conservative Party (Korean: 새로운보수당; Hanja: 새로운保守黨) was a South Korean conservative political party officially founded in 2020.

== History ==
The New Conservative Party was originally formed as the Emergency Action for Change and Innovation (변화와 혁신을 위한 비상행동) on 30 September 2019. The group, organized within the Bareunmirae Party, was made up of 15 lawmakers who were critical toward the leadership of Sohn Hak-kyu. Yoo Seong-min, the former co-chairman of the Bareunmirae Party, was chosen as the organizational leader.

On 4 December, the name was shortened to Change and Innovation (변화와 혁신), and then adopted the incumbent name on 12 December. However, six lawmakers were dropped, mainly pro-Ahn Cheol-soo lawmakers, since their head did not express a strong intention to join. Some pro-Ahn lawmakers also criticized the organization's decision to use "Conservative" in its name, adding that it ignores centrism.

On 5 January 2020, the New Conservative Party held an official formation convention.

== Ideology ==
The leader Ha Tae-keung said that the party seeks to be the "Youth conservative, moderate conservative, conservative overcomes the impeachment, fair conservative, and new and big conservative". The party also seeks to deal with social issues i.e. unfairness, future reform, eco-friendly development, and polarization.
