= Bareunmirae Party =

2018–2020 political party in South Korea

Bareunmirae Party 바른미래당
- Leader: Sohn Hak-kyu
- Floor leader: Lee Dong-seop (Acting)
- Secretary General: Hwang Han-woong
- Chair of the Policy Planning Committee: Lee Hae-sung
- Founded: 13 February 2018
- Dissolved: 24 February 2020
- Merger of: People's Party; Bareun Party
- Merged into: Minsaeng Party
- Ideology: Liberal conservatism; Factions: Conservatism; Regionalism; Centrist reformism; Pragmatism; Right-wing populism
- Political position: Centre-right; Factions: Centre to right-wing

Party flag

Website
- bareunmirae.kr

- Bareunmirae Party
- Hangul: 바른미래당
- Hanja: 바른未來黨
- Lit.: Righteous Future Party
- RR: Bareun miraedang
- MR: Parŭn miraedang

The Bareunmirae Party (Korean: 바른미래당), also known as the Bareun Mirae Party and Bareun Future Party, was a South Korean liberal-conservative political party. It was founded in 2018 by merger of the centrist liberal People's Party and the conservative Bareun Party.

== History ==
=== Founding ===
In January 2018, leaders of the party's predecessors announced their plan to merge, in an effort to form a centrist bloc and consolidate their parliamentary standings before local elections.

The merger was noted to be a bold political experiment, as People's Party is rooted in the Jeolla Provinces, while Bareun Party is rooted in the Gyeongsang Provinces.

The party was formally established on 13 February 2018.

The merger was commented as being "hasty", as it was announced before the two respective parties underwent due process to confirm the union, and was seen as an attempt to consolidate the plan amidst opposition. The merger plan faced opposition from members of both parties, citing concerns over differences in ideology and policy, particularly over differing stances on dealing with North Korea.

=== Internal split-off ===
The plan to form the Bareunmirae Party faced opposition from the faction of the People's Party associated with the provinces of North and South Jeolla (both of which are noted to be liberal-leaning provinces). Opposition within the People's Party led to 16 of its lawmakers, including Park Jie-won and Chung Dong-young, to announce plans for a new party. The lawmakers were noted to having belonged to a faction that was closely associated with late former President Kim Dae-jung. The new party, named Party for Democracy and Peace, was launched on 6 February 2018 alongside Bareunmirae, with the merging of the People's Party and Bareun Party.

== List of leaders ==
=== Chairpersons ===
No.	Name	Term of office	
No.	Name	Took office	Left office
1	Co-leadership: Park Joo-sun / Yoo Seong-min	13 February 2018	15 June 2018
—	Kim Dong-cheol	15 June 2018	2 September 2018
2	Sohn Hak-kyu	2 September 2018	23 February 2020

=== Assembly leaders (Floor leaders) ===
No.	Name	Term of office	
No.	Name	Took office	Left office
1	Kim Dong-cheol	13 February 2018	25 June 2018
2	Kim Kwan-young	25 June 2018	15 May 2019
2	Oh Shin-hwan	15 May 2019	23 February 2020

== Election results ==
Election	Leader	Metropolitan mayor/Governor	Provincial legislature	Municipal mayor	Municipal legislature
2018	Yoo Seong-min; Park Joo-sun	0 / 17	5 / 824	0 / 226	21 / 2,927

== See also ==
- Conservatism in South Korea
- Liberalism in South Korea
- Centrist reformism
