= Bareun Party =

2016–2018 political party in South Korea

Bareun Party 바른정당
- Leader: Yoo Seong-min
- Floor leader: Oh Sin-hwan
- Secretary General: Kim Sung-dong
- Chairman of the Policy Planning Committee: Ji Sang-wook
- Founded: 27 December 2016 (as a parliamentary group); 25 January 2017 (as a political party)
- Dissolved: 13 February 2018
- Split from: Saenuri Party
- Merged into: Bareunmirae Party
- Ideology: Conservatism (South Korean)
- Political position: Centre-right; Faction: Right wing
- Colors: Sky Blue

Party flag

Website
- bareun.party

- Bareun Party
- Hangul: 바른정당
- Hanja: 바른政黨
- RR: Bareun jeongdang
- MR: Parŭn chŏngdang

Conservative New Party for Reform
- Hangul: 개혁보수신당
- Hanja: 改革保守新黨
- RR: Gaehyeok bosu sindang
- MR: Kaehyŏk posu sindang

The Bareun Party (Korean: 바른정당; lit. 'Righteous Political Party') was a conservative political party in South Korea, announced on 27 December 2016 with the defection of 29 anti-Park Saenuri Party lawmakers. It was known as the Conservative New Party for Reform until 8 January 2017.

== History ==
The party was formed amidst a faction feud in the Liberty Korea Party (then Saenuri Party) involving pro and anti-Park Geun-hye forces. The party began as a parliamentary negotiation body that split from the Saenuri Party in December 2016, and became a party in January 2017.

=== Merger ===
In January 2018, the party's leader, along with the People's Party leader Ahn Cheol-soo, announced their plans to merge the two parties, in an effort to bolster the two party's parliamentary standing ahead of local elections in June.

The merger faces opposition from members of both parties, citing concerns over differences in ideology and policy, particularly over differing stances on dealing with North Korea. Nevertheless, the party approved the merger plans on 5 February 2018. The merger is expected to be finalized on February 13.

== Defections ==
During its existence, the party suffered from a spate of defections.

=== 2017 ===
By April 2017, the party had already lost 14 lawmakers.

In May, a week before the presidential election, 13 lawmakers affiliated with the party announced their decision to defect and return to the LKP. The decision came after the party's presidential candidate, Yoo Seong-min, declined to join forces with LKP's Hong Joon-pyo and PP's Ahn Cheol-soo and field a single presidential candidate. The defection left the party with just 19 seats in the National Assembly, one short of the 20 required for a political party to be recognized as a negotiating body.

Ahead of a leadership contest in November 2017, an additional eight lawmakers defected, and rejoined the LKP. The eight lawmakers were later joined by the party's floor leader, Joo Ho-young.

=== 2018 ===
On 9 January 2018, lawmaker Kim Se-yeon, Gyeonggi Province Governor Nam Kyung-pil, and lawmaker Park In-sook defected from the party, all of whom rejoined the LKP.

== Electoral results ==
| Election | Candidate | Votes | % | Result |
|---|---|---|---|---|
| 2017 | Yoo Seong-min | 2,208,771 | 6.76 | Not elected |

== See also ==
- Impeachment of Park Geun-hye
