= Yoo Seong-min =

South Korean economist and politician

The Honourable Yoo Seong-min
- 유승민
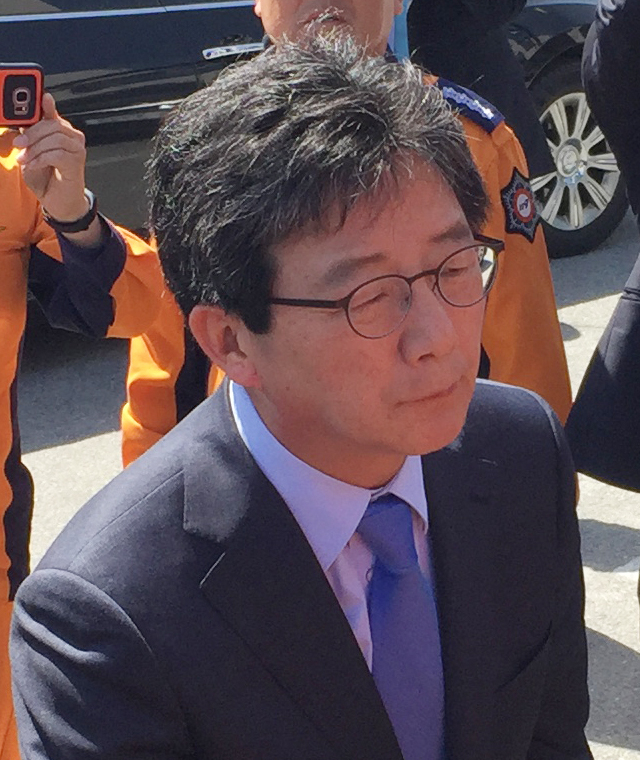
- Yoo in 2017

Member of the National Assembly
- In office 27 October 2005 – 29 May 2020
- Preceded by: Park Chang-dal
- Succeeded by: Kang Dae-sik
- Constituency: Dong B (Daegu)
- In office 30 May 2004 – 5 October 2005
- Constituency: Proportional representation

Leader of the Bareunmirae Party
- In office 13 February 2018 – 14 June 2018 Serving with Park Joo-sun
- Preceded by: Position established
- Succeeded by: Kim Dong-cheol (interim); Sohn Hak-kyu

Leader of the Bareun Party
- In office 13 November 2017 – 13 February 2018
- Preceded by: Lee Hye-hoon; Joo Ho-young (Acting)
- Succeeded by: Position abolished

Personal details
- Born: 7 January 1958 (age 68) Daegu, South Korea
- Party: People Power (since 2020)
- Other political affiliations: Grand National·Saenuri (2000–2016; 2016); Independent (2016; 2016–2017; 2020); Bareun (2017–2018); Bareunmirae (2018–2020); New Conservative (2020); United Future (2020)
- Education: Seoul National University (BA); University of Wisconsin–Madison (PhD)
- Occupation: Politician, economist

Military service
- Allegiance: South Korea
- Branch/service: Republic of Korea Army
- Years of service: 1979–1981
- Rank: Byeongjang (Sergeant)

Korean name
- Hangul: 유승민
- Hanja: 劉承旼
- RR: Yu Seungmin
- MR: Yu Sŭngmin
- IPA: ju.sɯŋ.min

Yoo Seong-min (Korean: 유승민; born 7 January 1958), also known as Yoo Seung-min, is a South Korean economist and politician. Yoo is a former member of the National Assembly and was the Bareun Party's presidential nominee in the 2017 South Korean presidential election. He is the son of late Daegu court chief, attorney and Member of Parliament, Yoo Soo-ho for Junggu of Daegu.

== Early life ==
Yoo was born in Daegu, and was the youngest child. His father was a farmer, but then became a judge and had been in politics for 8 years between 1985 and 1993. Yoo obtained his B.A. in Economics from Seoul National University in 1982, and his Ph.D. in Economics from the University of Wisconsin–Madison in 1987. His focus was in industrial organization with a minor in economic theory and mathematical economics/econometrics. Yoo's Ph.D. dissertation is titled "Entry Into a Foreign Market: Theory and Evidence" and was supervised under Rachel McCulloch.

After graduation Yoo worked as an economist at the Korea Development Institute (KDI) from 1987 to 2000. He then worked as President of the Youido Institute, a think-tank for then Hannara (now Liberty Korea) Party from 2000 to 2003.

== Hannara/Saenuri Party ==
=== Early political career ===
He was first elected as member of the National Assembly in 2004 as a member of the conservative Hannara Party as part of the proportional representation ticket. Yoo also served as Chief of Staff to future President and then-lawmaker/Chairman of the Hannara Party Park Geun-hye in 2005. He was considered her close aide. He went onto be elected three more times representing parts of Daegu.

Yoo was the floor leader for the Saenuri Party (renamed from Hannara) in the National Assembly, resigning from the position in July 2015.

=== Anti-Park faction ===
Yoo and Park Geun-hye reportedly grew apart following Park's loss in the presidential nomination process to Lee Myung-bak in the primary of the 2007 presidential election.

Following greater separation from Park in 2007, as well as his open critical comments of President Park's policies such as opposing the President's promise to expand welfare without increasing taxes, Yoo was deselected from his party's nomination process in for the 2016 general election. President Park called Yoo to be engaging in a "politics of betrayal." He stood as an independent in the 2016 election and managed to win with nearly three quarters of the vote. He stated after the election in interview that he would return to the Saenuri Party and did so.

Yoo was a notable member of the party for his previously close support for Park Geun-hye but later split from the pro-Park faction of the party. This contributed to his eventually founding of the splinter conservative party Bareun Party during President Park's political scandal.

== Bareun Party ==
Yoo went onto help form, and joined, the political group New Conservative Party for Reform (later permanently renamed the Bareun Party) during the 2016 South Korean political scandal. Bareun Party had enough defectors to become the fourth largest party in the National Assembly, with Yoo subsequently presented as "Candidate #4" in the 2017 presidential election.

=== 2017 presidential campaign ===
==== Party nomination ====
Yoo had run for the 2017 South Korean presidential election. Yoo faced a primary challenge against Nam Kyung-pil to be his party's nominee, but went onto win the presidential nomination of the Bareun Party on March 28, 2017.

==== Campaign platform ====
His campaign platform has been conservative on foreign policy (안보는 보수 - "maintaining national security") while calling for reforms on the South Korean economy (경제는 개혁 - "reforming the economy"). Yoo emphasizes "warm conservatism," which calls for reforms in the economy to provide what he brands himself to be true conservatism. This is in contrast to pro-Park Geun-hye faction in Korean conservative policies, which was the faction the Bareun Party split itself from and is currently known as the Liberty Korea Party.

==== Defection of Bareun Party members ====
About a week prior to the presidential election, 13 members of the Bareun party announced they would be defecting back to the Liberty Korea Party reasoning they should back one conservative candidate in the five-candidate field. One lawmaker, Hwang Young-cheul, reversed his decision the next day. The result of this defection helped boost Yoo's polling numbers.

==== Results ====
Yoo finished fourth in the election, with his best results in his home area of Daegu.

== Personal life ==
He has an elder brother and an elder sister. He and his wife have two adult children, a son (born 1982) and a daughter (born 1994).

== Political philosophy ==
He is considered one of the leading politicians who advocate moderate conservative factors.

In a lecture at Sungkyunkwan University on the theme of "economic crisis and the role of politics," Yoo said a "conservative revolution" aimed at warm, just conservatism based on Republican ideology is needed in an era of despair.

On republicanism, Yoo defined it as "a political order in which citizens enjoy freedom and practice civil virtue without subjugation to other citizens within the control of the law that guarantees public good." It also stressed aspects of public interests that the state and its citizens should pursue, saying that "the most important value in the republic is justice."

== Election results ==
Year	Elections	Constituency	Political party	Votes (%)	Results
2004	17th National Assembly General Election	Proportional representation (14th)	GNP	7,613,660 (35.76%)	Elected
2005	2005 By-election	Dong B (Daegu)	GNP	36,316 (52.03%)	Won
2008	18th National Assembly General Election	Dong B (Daegu)	GNP	55,394 (84.43%)	Won
2012	19th National Assembly General Election	Dong B (Daegu)	Saenuri	57,556 (67.41%)	Won
2016	20th National Assembly General Election	Dong B (Daegu)	Independent	61,429 (75.74%)	Won
2017	2017 Presidential Election	South Korea	Bareun	2,208,771 (6.76%)	Defeated (4th)

== Notes ==
National Assembly of the Republic of Korea
Preceded by	Member of the National Assembly from Proportional representation (14th, Grand National Party); 30 May 2004–5 October 2005	Succeeded by
Preceded by Park Chang-dal	Member of the National Assembly from Dong District B (Daegu); 28 October 2005–29 May 2020	Succeeded by Kang Dae-sik
Party political offices
Preceded by Lee Wan-koo	Floor Leader of the Sanuri Party; 2 February 2015–8 July 2015	Succeeded by Won Yoo-chul
Preceded by Lee Hye-hoon; Joo Ho-young (Acting)	Leader of the Bareun Party; 13 November 2017–13 February 2018	Succeeded by Office abolished
Preceded by New Office	Co-Leader of the Bareunmirae Party (With Park Joo-sun); 13 February 2018–14 June 2018	Succeeded by Kim Dong-cheol (Interim); Sohn Hak-kyu
Preceded by New Office	Bareun Party nominee for President of South Korea; 2017	Succeeded by Office abolished
