= List of members of the National Assembly (South Korea), 2016–2020 =

20th National Assembly of South Korea
←	19th	21st	→

Overview
- Jurisdiction: South Korea
- Election: 2016 South Korean legislative election

The 20th session of the National Assembly of South Korea first convened on 30 May 2016 and was seated until 29 May 2020. Its members were first elected in the 2016 legislative election held on 13 April 2016. It was preceded by the 19th National Assembly of South Korea and succeeded by the 21st National Assembly of South Korea.

== Composition ==
In the 2016 South Korean legislative election, four political parties were elected to the Assembly. As of 2017, three additional parties were newly established.

Party	Original elected seats			Closing seats		
Party	Con.	PR	Total	±	Total	%
Democratic Party	110	13	123	-3	120	41.38%
United Future Party	105	17	122	-30	92	31.72%
People Party	25	13	38	—N/a	—N/a	
Minsaeng Party	—N/a	—N/a	—N/a	—N/a	20	6.90%
Future Korea Party	—N/a	—N/a	—N/a	—N/a	20	6.90%
Platform Party	—N/a	—N/a	—N/a	—N/a	8	2.76%
Justice Party	2	4	6	0	6	2.07%
Our Republican Party	—N/a	—N/a	—N/a	—N/a	2	0.69%
Open Democratic Party	—N/a	—N/a	—N/a	—N/a	1	0.3%
Minjung Party	—N/a	—N/a	—N/a	—N/a	1	0.3%
Korean Economic Party	—N/a	—N/a	—N/a	—N/a	1	0.3%
People Party	—N/a	—N/a	—N/a	—N/a	1	0.3%
Pro-Park New Party	—N/a	—N/a	—N/a	—N/a	1	0.3%
Independent	11	—N/a	11	+6	17	5.86%
Totals	253	47	300	-10	290	100.0%

== Members ==
The following are the National Assembly members from 2016 until 2020.

Province/city	Constituency	Member	Party	
Province/city	Constituency	Member	At election	At term's end
Seoul	Jongno	Chung Sye-kyun	Democratic	Democratic
Seoul	Jung–Seongdong A	Hong Ihk-pyo	Democratic	Democratic
Seoul	Jung–Seongdong B	Ji Sang-wook	Saenuri	UFP
Seoul	Yongsan	Chin Young	Democratic	Democratic
Seoul	Gwangjin A	Jeon Hye-sook	Democratic	Democratic
Seoul	Gwangjin B	Choo Mi-ae	Democratic	Democratic
Seoul	Dongdaemun A	Ahn Gyu-back	Democratic	Democratic
Seoul	Dongdaemun B	Min Byung-doo	Democratic	Independent
Seoul	Jungnang A	Seo Young-kyo	Democratic	Democratic
Seoul	Jungnang B	Park Hong-keun	Democratic	Democratic
Seoul	Seongbuk A	You Seung-hee	Democratic	Democratic
Seoul	Seongbuk B	Ki Dong-min	Democratic	Democratic
Seoul	Gangbuk A	Cheong Yang-seog	Saenuri	UFP
Seoul	Gangbuk B	Park Yong-jin	Democratic	Democratic
Seoul	Dobong A	In Jae-keun	Democratic	Democratic
Seoul	Dobong B	Kim Seon-dong	Saenuri	UFP
Seoul	Nowon A	Koh Yong-jin	Democratic	Democratic
Seoul	Nowon B	Woo Won-shik	Democratic	Democratic
Seoul	Nowon C	Ahn Cheol-soo (Note: Ahn Cheol-soo resigned on 17 April 2017, to run in the 2017 South Korean presidential election.)	People	People
Seoul	Nowon C	Kim Seong-hwan (Note: Kim Seong-hwan was by-elected on 13 June 2018, to succeed Ahn Cheol-soo.)	Democratic	Democratic
Seoul	Eunpyeong A	Park Joo-min	Democratic	Democratic
Seoul	Eunpyeong B	Kang Byung-won	Democratic	Democratic
Seoul	Seodaemun A	Woo Sang-ho	Democratic	Democratic
Seoul	Seodaemun B	Kim Yeong-ho	Democratic	Democratic
Seoul	Mapo A	Noh Woong-rae	Democratic	Democratic
Seoul	Mapo B	Sohn Hye-won	Democratic	Democratic
Seoul	Yangcheon A	Hwang Hee	Democratic	Democratic
Seoul	Yangcheon B	Kim Yong-tae	Saenuri	UFP
Seoul	Gangseo A	Geum Tae-seop	Democratic	Democratic
Seoul	Gangseo B	Kim Sung-tae	Saenuri	UFP
Seoul	Gangseo C	Han Jeoung-ae	Democratic	Democratic
Seoul	Guro A	Lee In-young	Democratic	Democratic
Seoul	Guro B	Park Young-sun	Democratic	Democratic
Seoul	Geumcheon	Lee Hoon	Democratic	Democratic
Seoul	Yeongdeungpo A	Kim Young-joo	Democratic	Democratic
Seoul	Yeongdeungpo B	Shin Kyoung-min	Democratic	Democratic
Seoul	Dongjak A	Kim Byung-kee	Democratic	Democratic
Seoul	Dongjak B	Na Kyung-won	Saenuri	UFP
Seoul	Gwanak A	Kim Sung-shik	People	Independent
Seoul	Gwanak B	Oh Shin-hwan	Saenuri	UFP
Seoul	Seocho A	Lee Hye-hoon	Saenuri	UFP
Seoul	Seocho B	Park Seong-joong	Saenuri	UFP
Seoul	Gangnam A	Lee Jong-gu	Saenuri	UFP
Seoul	Gangnam B	Jun Hyeon-hee	Democratic	Democratic
Seoul	Gangnam C	Lee Eun-jae	Saenuri	Independent
Seoul	Songpa A	Park In-sook	Saenuri	UFP
Seoul	Songpa B	Choi Myeong-gil (Note: Choi Myeong-gil was removed on 5 December 2017.)	Democratic	People
Seoul	Songpa B	Choi Jae-seong (Note: Choi Jae-seong was by-elected on 13 June 2018, to succeed Choi Myeong-gil.)	Democratic	Democratic
Seoul	Songpa C	Nam In-soon	Democratic	Democratic
Seoul	Gangdong A	Jin Sun-mee	Democratic	Democratic
Seoul	Gangdong B	Shim Jae-kwon	Democratic	Democratic
Busan	Jung–Yeongdo	Kim Moo-sung	Saenuri	UFP
Busan	Seo–Dong	Yoo Ki-june	Saenuri	UFP
Busan	Busanjin A	Kim Young-choon	Democratic	Democratic
Busan	Busanjin B	Lee Hun-seung	Saenuri	UFP
Busan	Dongnae	Lee Jin-bok	Saenuri	UFP
Busan	Nam A	Kim Jung-hoon	Saenuri	UFP
Busan	Nam B	Park Jae-ho	Democratic	Democratic
Busan	Buk–Gangseo A	Chun Jae-soo	Democratic	Democratic
Busan	Buk–Gangseo B	Kim Do-eup	Saenuri	UFP
Busan	Haeundae A	Ha Tae-keung	Saenuri	UFP
Busan	Haeundae B	Bae Duk-kwang (Note: Bae Duk-kwang resigned on 23 January 2018.)	Saenuri	LKP
Busan	Haeundae B	Yun Jun-ho (Note: Yun Jun-ho was by-elected on 13 June 2018, to succeed Bae Duk-kwang.)	Democratic	Democratic
Busan	Saha A	Choi In-ho	Democratic	Democratic
Busan	Saha B	Cho Kyoung-tae	Saenuri	UFP
Busan	Geumjeong	Kim Se-yeon	Saenuri	UFP
Busan	Yeonje	Kim Hae-young	Democratic	Democratic
Busan	Suyeong	Yoo Jae-jung	Saenuri	UFP
Busan	Sasang	Chang Jae-won	Independent	UFP
Busan	Gijang	Yoon Sang-jik	Saenuri	UFP
Daegu	Jung–Nam	Kwak Sang-do	Saenuri	UFP
Daegu	Dong A	Chong Jong-sup	Saenuri	UFP
Daegu	Dong B	Yoo Seong-min	Independent	UFP
Daegu	Seo	Kim Sang-hoon	Saenuri	UFP
Daegu	Buk A	Jeong Tae-ok	Saenuri	Independent
Daegu	Buk B	Hong Eui-rak	Independent	Democratic
Daegu	Suseong A	Kim Boo-kyum	Democratic	Democratic
Daegu	Suseong B	Joo Ho-young	Independent	UFP
Daegu	Dalseo A	Kwak Dae-hoon	Saenuri	Independent
Daegu	Dalseo B	Yoon Jae-ok	Saenuri	UFP
Daegu	Dalseo C	Cho Won-jin	Saenuri	ORP
Daegu	Dalseong	Choo Kyung-ho	Saenuri	UFP
Incheon	Jung–Dong–Ganghwa–Ongjin	Ahn Sang-soo	Independent	UFP
Incheon	Nam A	Hong Il-pyo	Saenuri	UFP
Incheon	Nam B	Yoon Sang-hyun	Independent	Independent
Incheon	Yeonsu A	Park Chan-dae	Democratic	Democratic
Incheon	Yeonsu B	Min Kyung-wook	Saenuri	UFP
Incheon	Namdong A	Park Nam-choon (Note: Park Nam-choon resigned on 14 May 2018, to run in the 2018 Incheon mayoral election.)	Democratic	Democratic
Incheon	Namdong A	Maeng Sung-kyu (Note: Maeng Sung-kyu was by-elected on 13 June 2018, to succeed Park Nam-choon.)	Democratic	Democratic
Incheon	Namdong B	Youn Kwan-suk	Democratic	Democratic
Incheon	Bupyeong A	Jung Yu-seok	Saenuri	UFP
Incheon	Bupyeong B	Hong Young-pyo	Democratic	Democratic
Incheon	Gyeyang A	Yu Dong-su	Democratic	Democratic
Incheon	Gyeyang B	Song Young-gil	Democratic	Democratic
Incheon	Seo A	Lee Hag-jae	Saenuri	UFP
Incheon	Seo B	Shin Dong-kun	Democratic	Democratic
Gwangju	Dong–Nam A	Chang Byoung-wan	People	Minsaeng
Gwangju	Dong–Nam B	Park Joo-sun	People	Minsaeng
Gwangju	Seo A	Song Gi-seok (Note: Song Gi-seok was removed on 8 February 2018.)	People	People
Gwangju	Seo A	Song Gap-seok (Note: Song Gap-seok was by-elected on 13 June 2018, to succeed Song Gi-seok.)	Democratic	Democratic
Gwangju	Seo B	Chun Jung-bae	People	Minsaeng
Gwangju	Buk A	Kim Gyeong-jin	People	Independent
Gwangju	Buk B	Choi Gyeong-hwan	People	Minsaeng
Gwangju	Gwangsan A	Kim Dong-cheol	People	Minsaeng
Gwangju	Gwangsan B	Gwon Eun-hui	People	PP
Daejeon	Dong	Lee Jang-woo	Saenuri	UFP
Daejeon	Jung	Lee Eun-gwon	Saenuri	UFP
Daejeon	Seo A	Park Byeong-seug	Democratic	Democratic
Daejeon	Seo B	Park Beom-kye	Democratic	Democratic
Daejeon	Yuseong	Jo Seung-rae	Democratic	Democratic
Daejeon	Yuseong B	Lee Sang-min	Democratic	Democratic
Daejeon	Daedeok	Jeong Yong-ki	Saenuri	UFP
Ulsan	Jung	Jeong Kab-yoon	Saenuri	UFP
Ulsan	Nam A	Lee Chae-ik	Saenuri	UFP
Ulsan	Nam B	Park Maeng-woo	Saenuri	UFP
Ulsan	Dong	Kim Jong-hoon	Independent	Minjung
Ulsan	Buk	Yoon Jong-oh (Note: Yoon Jong-oh was removed on 22 December 2017.)	Independent	Minjung
Ulsan	Buk	Lee Sang-hoon (Note: Lee Sang-hoon was by-elected on 13 June 2018, to succeed Yoon Jong-oh.)	Democratic	Democratic
Ulsan	Ulju	Kang Ghil-boo	Independent	Independent
Sejong		Lee Hae-chan	Independent	Democratic
Gyeonggi Province	Suwon A	Lee Chan-yeol	Democratic	UFP
Gyeonggi Province	Suwon B	Baek Hye-ryun	Democratic	Democratic
Gyeonggi Province	Suwon C	Kim Yeong-jin	Democratic	Democratic
Gyeonggi Province	Suwon D	Park Kwang-on	Democratic	Democratic
Gyeonggi Province	Suwon E	Kim Jin-pyo	Democratic	Democratic
Gyeonggi Province	Sujeong, Seongnam	Kim Tae-nyeon	Democratic	Democratic
Gyeonggi Province	Jungwon, Seongnam	Shin Sang-jin	Saenuri	UFP
Gyeonggi Province	Bundang A, Seongnam	Kim Byung-gwan	Democratic	Democratic
Gyeonggi Province	Bundang B, Seongnam	Kim Byung-uk	Democratic	Democratic
Gyeonggi Province	Uijeongbu A	Moon Hee-sang	Democratic	Independent
Gyeonggi Province	Uijeongbu B	Hong Mun-jong	Saenuri	PNP
Gyeonggi Province	Manan, Anyang	Lee Jong-kul	Democratic	Democratic
Gyeonggi Province	Dongan A, Anyang	Lee Seok-hyun	Democratic	Democratic
Gyeonggi Province	Dongan B, Anyang	Shim Jae-chul	Saenuri	UFP
Gyeonggi Province	Wonmi A, Bucheon	Kim Gyeong-hyeop	Democratic	Democratic
Gyeonggi Province	Wonmi B, Bucheon	Sul Hoon	Democratic	Democratic
Gyeonggi Province	Sosa, Bucheon	Kim Sang-hee	Democratic	Democratic
Gyeonggi Province	Ojeong, Bucheon	Won Hye-young	Democratic	Democratic
Gyeonggi Province	Gwangmyeong A	Baek Jae-hyun	Democratic	Democratic
Gyeonggi Province	Gwangmyeong B	Lee Un-ju	Democratic	UFP
Gyeonggi Province	Pyeongtaek A	Won Yoo-chul	Saenuri	UFP
Gyeonggi Province	Pyeongtaek B	Yoo Ui-dong	Saenuri	UFP
Gyeonggi Province	Dongducheon–Yeoncheon	Kim Seong-won	Saenuri	UFP
Gyeonggi Province	Sangnok A, Ansan	Jeon Hae-cheol	Democratic	Democratic
Gyeonggi Province	Sangnok B, Ansan	Kim Cheol-min	Democratic	Democratic
Gyeonggi Province	Danwon A, Ansan	Kim Myung-yeon	Saenuri	UFP
Gyeonggi Province	Danwon B, Ansan	Park Sun-ja	Saenuri	UFP
Gyeonggi Province	Goyang A	Sim Sang-jung	Justice	Justice
Gyeonggi Province	Goyang B	Jung Jae-ho	Democratic	Democratic
Gyeonggi Province	Goyang C	Yoo Eun-hae	Democratic	Democratic
Gyeonggi Province	Goyang D	Kim Hyun-mee	Democratic	Democratic
Gyeonggi Province	Uiwang–Gwacheon	Sim Chang-hyeon	Democratic	Democratic
Gyeonggi Province	Guri	Yun Ho-jung	Democratic	Democratic
Gyeonggi Province	Namyangju A	Cho Eung-chun	Democratic	Democratic
Gyeonggi Province	Namyangju B	Kim Han-jeong	Democratic	Democratic
Gyeonggi Province	Namyangju C	Joo Kwang-deok	Saenuri	UFP
Gyeonggi Province	Osan	An Min-suk	Democratic	Democratic
Gyeonggi Province	Siheung A	Ham Jin-kyu	Saenuri	UFP
Gyeonggi Province	Siheung B	Cho Jeong-sik	Democratic	Democratic
Gyeonggi Province	Gunpo A	Kim Jeong-woo	Democratic	Democratic
Gyeonggi Province	Gunpo B	Lee Hak-yeong	Democratic	Democratic
Gyeonggi Province	Hanam	Lee Hyun-jae	Saenuri	Independent
Gyeonggi Province	Yongin A	Lee Woo-hyun (Note: Lee Woo-hyun was removed on 30 May 2019.)	Saenuri	LKP
Gyeonggi Province	Yongin B	Kim Min-gi	Democratic	Democratic
Gyeonggi Province	Yongin C	Han Sun-kyo	Saenuri	UFP
Gyeonggi Province	Yongin D	Pyo Chang-won	Democratic	Democratic
Gyeonggi Province	Paju A	Yoon Hu-duk	Democratic	Democratic
Gyeonggi Province	Paju B	Park Jeong	Democratic	Democratic
Gyeonggi Province	Icheon	Song Seok-jun	Saenuri	UFP
Gyeonggi Province	Anseong	Kim Hak-yong	Saenuri	UFP
Gyeonggi Province	Gimpo A	Kim Doo-kwan	Democratic	Democratic
Gyeonggi Province	Gimpo B	Hong Chul-ho	Saenuri	UFP
Gyeonggi Province	Hwaseong A	Seo Chung-won	Saenuri	ORP
Gyeonggi Province	Hwaseong B	Lee Won-uk	Democratic	Democratic
Gyeonggi Province	Hwaseong C	Kwon Chil-seung	Democratic	Democratic
Gyeonggi Province	Gwangju A	So Byeong-hun	Democratic	Democratic
Gyeonggi Province	Gwangju B	Im Jong-seong	Democratic	Democratic
Gyeonggi Province	Yangju	Chung Seong-ho	Democratic	Democratic
Gyeonggi Province	Pocheon–Gapyeong	Kim Young-woo	Saenuri	UFP
Gyeonggi Province	Yeoju–Yangpyeong	Choung Byoung-gug	Saenuri	UFP
Gangwon Province	Chuncheon	Kim Jin-tae	Saenuri	UFP
Gangwon Province	Wonju A	Kim Ki-sun	Saenuri	UFP
Gangwon Province	Wonju B	Song Ki-hun	Democratic	Democratic
Gangwon Province	Gangneung	Kweon Seong-dong	Saenuri	Independent
Gangwon Province	Donghae–Samcheok	Lee Chul-gyu	Independent	UFP
Gangwon Province	Taebaek–Hoengseong–Yeongwol–Pyeongchang–Jeongseon	Yeom Dong-yeol	Saenuri	UFP
Gangwon Province	Sokcho–Goseong–Yangyang	Lee Yang-su	Saenuri	UFP
Gangwon Province	Hongcheon–Cheorwon–Hwacheon–Yanggu–Inje	Hwang Young-cheul (Note: Hwang Young-cheul was removed on 31 October 2019.)	Saenuri	LKP
North Chungcheong Province	Sangdang, Cheongju	Chung Woo-taik	Saenuri	UFP
North Chungcheong Province	Seowon, Cheongju	Oh Jae-sae	Democratic	Democratic
North Chungcheong Province	Heungdeok, Cheongju	Do Jong-hwan	Democratic	Democratic
North Chungcheong Province	Cheongwon, Cheongju	Byun Jae-ill	Democratic	Democratic
North Chungcheong Province	Chungju	Lee Jong-bae	Saenuri	UFP
North Chungcheong Province	Jecheon–Danyang	Gwon Seok-chang (Note: Gwon Seok-chang was removed on 11 May 2018.)	Saenuri	LKP
North Chungcheong Province	Jecheon–Danyang	Lee Hu-sam (Note: Lee Hu-sam was by-elected on 13 June 2018, to succeed Gwon Seok-chang.)	Democratic	Democratic
North Chungcheong Province	Boeun–Okcheon–Yeongdong–Goesan	Park Deok-hyum	Saenuri	UFP
North Chungcheong Province	Jeungpyeong–Jincheon–Eumseong	Kyung Dae-soo	Saenuri	UFP
South Chungcheong Province	Cheonan A	Park Chan-woo (Note: Park Chan-woo was removed on 13 February 2018.)	Saenuri	LKP
South Chungcheong Province	Cheonan A	Lee Gyu-hee (Note: Lee Gyu-hee was by-elected on 13 June 2018, to succeed Park Chan-woo.)	Democratic	Democratic
South Chungcheong Province	Cheonan B	Park Wan-ju	Democratic	Democratic
South Chungcheong Province	Cheonan C	Yang Seoung-jo (Note: Yang Seoung-jo resigned on 14 May 2018, to run in the 2018 South Chungcheong gubernatorial election.)	Democratic	Democratic
South Chungcheong Province	Cheonan C	Yun Il-gyu (Note: Yun Il-gyu was by-elected on 13 June 2018, to succeed Yang Seoung-jo.)	Democratic	Democratic
South Chungcheong Province	Gongju–Buyeo–Cheongyang	Chung Jin-suk	Saenuri	UFP
South Chungcheong Province	Boryeong–Seocheon	Kim Tae-heum	Saenuri	UFP
South Chungcheong Province	Asan A	Lee Myoung-su	Saenuri	UFP
South Chungcheong Province	Asan B	Kang Hun-sik	Democratic	Democratic
South Chungcheong Province	Seosan–Taean	Sung Il-jong	Saenuri	UFP
South Chungcheong Province	Nonsan–Gyeryong–Geumsan	Kim Jong-min	Democratic	Democratic
South Chungcheong Province	Dangjin	Eo Ki-kyu	Democratic	Democratic
South Chungcheong Province	Hongseong–Yesan	Hong Moon-pyo	Saenuri	UFP
North Jeolla Province	Jeonju A	Kim Gwang-su	People	Independent
North Jeolla Province	Jeonju B	Chung Woon-chun	Saenuri	UFP
North Jeolla Province	Jeonju C	Chung Dong-young	People	Minsaeng
North Jeolla Province	Gunsan	Kim Kwan-young	People	Independent
North Jeolla Province	Iksan A	Lee Choon-suak	Democratic	Democratic
North Jeolla Province	Iksan B	Cho Bae-sook	People	Minsaeng
North Jeolla Province	Jeongeup–Gochang	Yu Sung-yup	People	Minsaeng
North Jeolla Province	Namwon–Imsil–Sunchang	Lee Yong-ho	People	Independent
North Jeolla Province	Gimje–Buan	Kim Jong-hee	People	Independent
North Jeolla Province	Wanju–Jinan–Muju–Jangsu	An Ho-young	Democratic	Democratic
South Jeolla Province	Mokpo	Park Jie-won	People	Minsaeng
South Jeolla Province	Yeosu A	Lee Yong-ju	People	Independent
South Jeolla Province	Yeosu B	Joo Seung-yong	People	Minsaeng
South Jeolla Province	Suncheon	Lee Jung-hyun	Saenuri	Independent
South Jeolla Province	Naju–Hwasun	Son Kum-ju	People	Democratic
South Jeolla Province	Gwangyang–Gokseong–Gurye	Jeong In-hwa	People	Independent
South Jeolla Province	Damyang–Hwapyeong–Yeonggwang–Jangseong	Lee Kai-ho	Democratic	Democratic
South Jeolla Province	Goheung–Boseong–Jangheung–Gangjin	Hwang Ju-hong	People	Minsaeng
South Jeolla Province	Haenam–Wando–Jindo	Yoon Young-il	People	Minsaeng
South Jeolla Province	Yeongam–Muan–Sinan	Park Jun-yeong (Note: Park Jun-yeong was removed on 8 February 2018.)	People	PDP
South Jeolla Province	Yeongam–Muan–Sinan	Seo Sam-seok (Note: Seo Sam-seok was by-elected on 13 June 2018, to succeed Park Jun-yeong.)	Democratic	Democratic
North Gyeongsang Province	Buk, Pohang	Kim Jeong-jae	Saenuri	UFP
North Gyeongsang Province	Nam, Pohang–Ulleung	Park Myung-jae	Saenuri	UFP
North Gyeongsang Province	Gyeongju	Kim Seok-ki	Saenuri	UFP
North Gyeongsang Province	Gimcheon	Lee Cheol-woo (Note: Lee Cheol-woo resigned on 14 May 2018, to run in the 2018 North Gyeongsang gubernatorial election.)	Saenuri	LKP
North Gyeongsang Province	Gimcheon	Song Eon-seok (Note: Song Eon-seok was by-elected on 13 June 2018, to succeed Lee Cheol-woo.)	LKP	UFP
North Gyeongsang Province	Andong	Kim Kwang-lim	Saenuri	UFP
North Gyeongsang Province	Gumi A	Baek Seung-joo	Saenuri	UFP
North Gyeongsang Province	Gumi B	Chang Seok-chun	Saenuri	UFP
North Gyeongsang Province	Yeongju–Mungyeong–Yecheon	Choi Gyo-il	Saenuri	UFP
North Gyeongsang Province	Yeongcheon–Cheongdo	Lee Man-hee	Saenuri	UFP
North Gyeongsang Province	Sangju–Gunwi–Uiseong–Cheongsong	Kim Jong-tae (Note: Kim Jong-tae was removed on 9 February 2017.)	Saenuri	Saenuri
North Gyeongsang Province	Sangju–Gunwi–Uiseong–Cheongsong	Kim Jae-won (Note: Seo Gi-ho was by-elected on 13 April 2017, to succeed Kim Jong-tae.)	LKP	UFP
North Gyeongsang Province	Gyeongsan	Choi Kyoung-hwan (Note: Choi Kyoung-hwan was removed on 11 July 2019.)	Saenuri	LKP
North Gyeongsang Province	Yeongyang–Yeongdeok–Bonghwa–Uljin	Kang Seok-ho	Saenuri	UFP
North Gyeongsang Province	Goryeong–Seongju–Chilgok	Yi Wan-young (Note: Yi Wan-young was removed on 13 June 2019.)	Saenuri	LKP
South Gyeongsang Province	Uichang, Changwon	Park Wan-su	Saenuri	UFP
South Gyeongsang Province	Seongsan, Changwon	Roh Hoe-chan (Note: Roh Hoe-chan died on 23 July 2018.)	Justice	Justice
South Gyeongsang Province	Seongsan, Changwon	Yeo Yeong-gug (Note: Yeo Yeong-gug was by-elected on 3 April 2019, to succeed Roh Hoe-chan.)	Justice	Justice
South Gyeongsang Province	Masanhappo, Changwon	Lee Ju-young	Saenuri	UFP
South Gyeongsang Province	Masanhoewon, Changwon	Yoon Han-hong	Saenuri	UFP
South Gyeongsang Province	Jinhae, Changwon	Kim Sung-chan	Saenuri	UFP
South Gyeongsang Province	Jinju A	Park Dae-chul	Saenuri	UFP
South Gyeongsang Province	Jinju B	Kim Jae-kyung	Saenuri	UFP
South Gyeongsang Province	Tongyeong–Goseong	Lee Gun-hyeon (Note: Lee Gun-hyeon was removed on 27 December 2018.)	Saenuri	LKP
South Gyeongsang Province	Tongyeong–Goseong	Jeong Jeom-sig (Note: Jeong Jeom-sig was by-elected on 3 April 2019, to succeed Lee Gun-hyeon.)	LKP	UFP
South Gyeongsang Province	Sacheon–Namhae–Hadong	Yeo Sang-gyu	Saenuri	UFP
South Gyeongsang Province	Gimhae A	Min Hong-chul	Democratic	Democratic
South Gyeongsang Province	Gimhae B	Kim Kyung-soo (Note: Kim Kyung-soo resigned on 14 May 2018, to run in the 2018 South Gyeongsang gubernatorial election.)	Democratic	Democratic
South Gyeongsang Province	Gimhae B	Kim Jeong-ho (Note: Kim Jeong-ho was by-elected on 13 June 2018, to succeed Kim Kyung-soo.)	Democratic	Democratic
South Gyeongsang Province	Miryang–Uiryeong–Haman–Changnyeong	Um Yong-su (Note: Um Yong-su was removed on 15 November 2019.)	Saenuri	LKP
South Gyeongsang Province	Geoje	Kim Han-pyo	Saenuri	UFP
South Gyeongsang Province	Yangsan A	Yoon Young-suk	Saenuri	UFP
South Gyeongsang Province	Yangsan B	Seo Hyung-soo	Democratic	Democratic
South Gyeongsang Province	Sancheong–Hamyang–Geochang–Hapcheon	Kang Seok-jin	Saenuri	UFP
Jeju Province	Jeju City A	Kang Chang-il	Democratic	Democratic
Jeju Province	Jeju City B	Oh Young-hun	Democratic	Democratic
Jeju Province	Seogwipo	Wi Seong-gon	Democratic	Democratic
National	Proportional representation	Song Hee-kyung	Saenuri	UFP
National	Proportional representation	Lee Jong-myung	Saenuri	UFP
National	Proportional representation	Lim Lee-ja	Saenuri	UFP
National	Proportional representation	Moon Jin-guk	Saenuri	UFP
National	Proportional representation	Choi Yeon-hye	Saenuri	UFP
National	Proportional representation	Kim Gyu-hwan	Saenuri	UFP
National	Proportional representation	Shin Bo-ra	Saenuri	UFP
National	Proportional representation	Kim Sung-tae	Saenuri	UFP
National	Proportional representation	Jeon Hee-gyeong	Saenuri	UFP
National	Proportional representation	Kim Jong-suk	Saenuri	UFP
National	Proportional representation	Kim Seung-hee	Saenuri	UFP
National	Proportional representation	Yoo Min-bong	Saenuri	UFP
National	Proportional representation	Yun Jong-pil	Saenuri	UFP
National	Proportional representation	Cho Hoon-hyun	Saenuri	UFP
National	Proportional representation	Kim Sun-rye	Saenuri	UFP
National	Proportional representation	Kang Hyo-sang	Saenuri	UFP
National	Proportional representation	Kim Hyun-ah	Saenuri	UFP
National	Proportional representation	Shin Yong-hyeon	People	Minsaeng
National	Proportional representation	Oh Se-jung (Note: Oh Se-jung resigned on 1 October 2018, to run in the election of the president of the Seoul National University.)	People	Bareunmirae
National	Proportional representation	Park Joo-hyun	People	Minsaeng
National	Proportional representation	Lee Sang-don	People	Minsaeng
National	Proportional representation	Park Sun-sook	People	Minsaeng
National	Proportional representation	Chae Yi-bae	People	Minsaeng
National	Proportional representation	Kim Su-min (Note: Kim Su-min was removed on 19 March 2020.)	People	Minsaeng
National	Proportional representation	Lee Tae-gyu	People	Minsaeng
National	Proportional representation	Kim Sam-hwa (Note: Kim Sam-hwa was removed on 19 March 2020.)	People	Minsaeng
National	Proportional representation	Kim Jung-ro (Note: Kim Jung-ro was removed on 19 March 2020.)	People	Minsaeng
National	Proportional representation	Chang Jeong-suk	People	Minsaeng
National	Proportional representation	Lee Dong-seop (Note: Lee Dong-seop was removed on 19 March 2020.)	People	Minsaeng
National	Proportional representation	Choi Do-ja	People	Minsaeng
National	Proportional representation	Lim Jae-hoon (Note: Lim Jae-hoon took office on 2 October 2018, to succeed Oh Se-jung.)	Bareunmirae (Note: Included in the People Party list in the 2016 election.)	Minsaeng
National	Proportional representation	Park Kyung-mi	Democratic	Democratic
National	Proportional representation	Kim Chong-in (Note: Kim Chong-in was removed on 8 March 2017.)	Democratic	Democratic
National	Proportional representation	Song Ok-ju	Democratic	Democratic
National	Proportional representation	Choi Woon-yeol	Democratic	Democratic
National	Proportional representation	Lee Jae-jeong	Democratic	Democratic
National	Proportional representation	Kim Hyun-kwon	Democratic	Democratic
National	Proportional representation	Mun Mi-ock (Note: Mun Mi-ock resigned on 20 June 2017, upon being appointed as Advisor to the President for Science and Technology.)	Democratic	Democratic
National	Proportional representation	Lee Chul-hee	Democratic	Democratic
National	Proportional representation	Je Youn-kyung	Democratic	Democratic
National	Proportional representation	Kim Sung-soo (Note: Kim Sung-soo resigned on 30 January 2020, upon being appointed as Chief of Staff of the Prime Minister's Secretariat.)	Democratic	Democratic
National	Proportional representation	Kwon Mi-hyuk	Democratic	Democratic
National	Proportional representation	Lee Yong-deuk	Democratic	Democratic
National	Proportional representation	Jung Choun-sook	Democratic	Democratic
National	Proportional representation	Shim Gi-jun (Note: Shim Gi-jun took office on 14 March 2017, to succeed Kim Chong-in.)	Democratic	Democratic
National	Proportional representation	Lee Su-hyeok (Note: Lee Su-hyeok took office on 22 June 2017, to succeed Mun Mi-ock, but resigned on 10 October 2019, upon being appointed as ambassador of South Korea to the United States.)	Democratic	Democratic
National	Proportional representation	Jung Eun-hye (Note: Jung Eun-hye took office on 11 October 2019, to succeed Lee Su-hyeok.)	Democratic	Democratic
National	Proportional representation	Huh Yoon-jung (Note: Huh Yoon-jung took office on 31 January 2020, to succeed Kim Sung-soo.)	Democratic	Democratic
National	Proportional representation	Lee Jung-mi	Justice	Justice
National	Proportional representation	Kim Jong-dae	Justice	Justice
National	Proportional representation	Choo Hye-seon	Justice	Justice
National	Proportional representation	Yun So-ha	Justice	Justice

== See also ==
- Lists of members of the National Assembly (South Korea)

Preceded by 2012–16	Members of the National Assembly	Succeeded by 2020–24
