= The Yeouido Institute =

Policy research institute in South Korea

The Yeouido Research Institute
- 여의도연구원

- Founded: February 1995
- Location: 4F, 19, Gukhoe-daero 74-gil, Yeongdeungpo-gu, Seoul, South Korea (Yeouido-dong, Dongwoo International Building)
- Chairman: Jang Dong-hyuk
- Director of Research: Cho Seung-hwan
- Affiliations: People Power Party
- Website: ydi.org.kr
- Formerly called: Yeouido Research Institute

The Yeouido Research Institute (Korean: 여의도연구원) is the think tank of the People Power Party and South Korea's first political party policy research institute. It was established by the Democratic Liberal Party in 1995.

After the "Yeouido Research Institute Innovation Plan" was approved by the Saenuri Party's Supreme Council in 2013, the party's Standing National Committee convened on 2 October 2013 and passed an amendment to the party rules. Consequently, the Yeouido Institute was renamed the Yeouido Research Institute, and the party leader assumed the role of its board chairman.

Since its launch on 1 September 2020, the People Power Party has emphasised strengthening its policy-oriented role and contributing to national development. The institute conducts research on long-term national visions and strategies, including “Promise for Everyone’s Tomorrow,” “Our Beliefs,” and “Basic Policies,” and communicates with the public through education. The party focuses on developing diverse politics based on several core values, including national integration, innovation and reform, opportunity and fairness, respect for labor, support for vulnerable groups, and a foreign and security policy oriented toward peaceful unification.

In 2020, a "Citizen's Hope Vision," comprising 150 policy initiatives across 17 sectors such as real estate, welfare, education, and transportation, was presented to the People Power Party. The "Citizen's Hope Vision" incorporated the views of citizens in Seoul and Busan to support candidates running in the 2021 by-elections.

== Past Chairpersons and Directors ==
=== Past Chairpersons of the Board ===
==== Chairman of the Yeouido Institute ====
No.	Name	Term	Party	Notes
1	Kim Deok-ryong	February 1995 – July 1995	Democratic Liberal Party	
2	Kim Yun-hwan	July 1995 – November 1995	Democratic Liberal Party	
3	Kang Sam-jae	November 1995 – March 1997	Democratic Liberal Party (1995); New Korea Party (1995–1997)	
4	Park Gwan-yong	March 1997 – August 1997	New Korea Party	
5	Kang Jae-seop	August 1997 – October 1997	New Korea Party	
6	Kim Tae-ho	October 1997 – February 1998	New Korea Party (1997); Grand National Party (1997–1998)	
7	Seo Cheong-won	February 1998 – December 1998	Grand National Party	
8	Lee Hoi-chang	December 1998 – January 1999	Grand National Party	
9	Choe Byeong-ryeol	October 2003 – May 2004	Grand National Party	
10	Park Geun-hye	May 2004 – June 2006	Grand National Party	
11	Kim Young-sun	June 2006 – July 2006	Grand National Party	
12	Kang Jae-seop	July 2006 – October 2007	Grand National Party	
13	Ahn Byeong-jik	October 2007 – May 2008	Grand National Party	
14	Hong Joon-pyo	May 2008 – May 2008	Grand National Party	
15	Jeon Seok-hong	May 2008 – October 2013	Grand National Party (2008–2012); Saenuri Party (2012–2013)	

==== Chairman of the Yeouido Research Institute ====
No.	Name	Term	Party	Notes
1	Hwang Woo-yeo	October 2013 – May 2014	Saenuri Party	
2	Lee Wan-koo	May 2014 – July 2014	Saenuri Party	
3	Kim Moo-sung	July 2014 – August 2016	Saenuri Party	
4	Lee Jung-hyun	August 2016 – January 2017	Saenuri Party	
5	In Myung-jin	January 2017 – July 2017	Saenuri Party (2017); Liberty Korea Party (2017)	
6	Hong Joon-pyo	July 2017 – June 2018	Liberty Korea Party	Resigned following the party's defeat in the 7th nationwide local elections
7	Kim Sung-tae	July 2018	Liberty Korea Party	
8	Kim Byung-joon	July 2018 – February 2019	Liberty Korea Party	
9	Hwang Kyo-ahn	February 2019 – April 2020	Liberty Korea Party (2019–2020); United Future Party(2020)	Resigned following the party's defeat in the 21st National Assembly election
10	Kim Jong-in	May 2020 – April 2021	United Future Party (2020); People Power Party (2020–2021)	
11	Joo Ho-young	April 2021	People Power Party	
12	Kim Gi-hyeon	April 2021 – June 2021	People Power Party	
13	Lee Jun-seok	June 2021 – July 2022	People Power Party	Removed from office following disciplinary action
14	Kwon Seong-dong	July 2022 – September 2022	People Power Party	
15	Joo Ho-young	August 2022	People Power Party	
16	Jung Jin-suk	September 2022 – March 2023	People Power Party	
17	Kim Gi-hyeon	March 2023 – December 2023	People Power Party	
18	Yoon Jae-ok	December 2023	People Power Party	
19	Han Dong-hoon	December 2023 – April 2024	People Power Party	
20	Yoon Jae-ok	April 2024 – July 2024	People Power Party	
21	Hwang Woo-yeo	July 2024 – December 2024	People Power Party	
22	Kwon Young-se	December 2024 – December 2024	People Power Party	
23	Kwon Young-se	December 2024 – May 2025	People Power Party	
24	Kim Yong-tae	May 2025 – May 2025	People Power Party	
25	Kim Yong-tae	May 2025 – June 2025	People Power Party	
26	Song Eon-seok	June 2025 – August 2025	People Power Party	
27	Jang Dong-hyuk	August 2025 – present	People Power Party	

=== Past Directors ===
==== Director of the Yeouido Institute ====
No.	Name	Term	Party	Notes
1	Lee Hyeong-taek	February 1995 – February 1996	Democratic Liberal Party (1995); New Korea Party (1995–1996)	
2	Yoon Yeong-ho	February 1996 – May 1998	New Korea Party (1996–1997); Grand National Party (1997–1998)	
3	Seok Jong-hyeon	May 1998 – December 1998	Grand National Party	
4	Yoon Yeong-gwan	December 1998 – February 2000	Grand National Party	
5	Yoon Seung-min	February 2002 – September 2003	Grand National Party	
6	Yoon Deok-jun	September 2003 – August 2004	Grand National Party	
7	Park Se-il	August 2004 – January 2005	Grand National Party	
8	Yoon Geon-young	January 2005 – July 2005	Grand National Party	
9	Kim Gi-chun	July 2005 – June 2006	Grand National Party	
10	Im Tae-hee	July 2006 – September 2007	Grand National Party	
11	Seo Byeong-su	September 2007 – August 2008	Grand National Party	
12	Kim Seok-jun	August 2008 – June 2009	Grand National Party	
13	Jin Soo-hee	June 2009 – July 2010	Grand National Party	
14	Joo Ho-young	July 2010 – July 2011	Grand National Party	
15	Jeong Du-eon	July 2011 – December 2011	Grand National Party	
16	Kim Gwang-rim	December 2011 – May 2013	Grand National Party (2011–2012); Saenuri Party (2012–2013)	

==== Director of the Yeouido Research Institute ====
No.	Name	Term in office	Party	Notes
1	Lee Ju-young	May 2013 – June 2015	Saenuri Party	
2	Kim Jong-hoon	June 2015 – November 2016	Saenuri Party	Resigned over the Park Geun-hye–Choi Soon-sil scandal
3	Choo Kyung-ho	November 2016 – July 2017	Saenuri Party	
4	Kim Dae-sik	July 2017 – July 2018	Liberty Korea Party	
5	Kim Seon-dong	July 2018 – March 2019	Liberty Korea Party	
6	Kim Se-yeon	March 2019 – December 2019	Liberty Korea Party	
7	Sung Dong-kyu	December 2019 – April 2020	Liberty Korea Party (2019–2020); United Future Party (2020)	Resigned following the party's defeat in the 21st National Assembly election
8	Ji Sang-wook	April 2020 – September 2022	United Future Party (2020); People Power Party (2020–)	
9	Kim Yong-tae	September 2022 – March 2023	People Power Party	
10	Park Soo-young	March 2023 – October 2023	People Power Party	
11	Kim Seong-won	October 2023 – December 2023	People Power Party	
12	Hong Young-pyo	December 2023 – August 2024	People Power Party	
13	Yoo Eui-dong	August 2024 – January 2025	People Power Party	
14	Yoon Hee-sook	January 2025 – August 2025	People Power Party	
15	Cho Seung-hwan	September 2025 – present	People Power Party	

== See also ==
- Democratic Liberal Party
- New Korea Party
- Grand National Party
- Saenuri Party
- Liberty Korea Party
- United Future Party
- People Power Party
- International Democracy Union
- The Institute for Democracy
