= Kim Jae-ho =

Kim Jae-ho may refer to:

- Kim Jae-ho (judge) (born 1963), South Korean judge
- Kim Jae-ho (baseball) (born 1985), South Korean baseball player
