= Yeom Dong-yeol =

South Korean politician (born 1961)

- 염동열

Member of the National Assembly
- In office 30 May 2016 – 29 May 2020
- Preceded by: Hwang Young-cheul (Hoengseong-gun)
- Constituency: Gangwon Taebaek; Hoengseong-gun; Yeongwol-gun; Pyeongchang-gun; Jeongseon-gun
- In office 30 May 2012 – 29 May 2016
- Preceded by: Choi Jong-won
- Succeeded by: Himself (partially)
- Constituency: Gangwon Taebaek Yeongwol-gun; Pyeongchang-gun Jeongseon-gun

Secretary-General of the Future Korea Party
- In office 21 March 2020 – 29 May 2020
- Preceded by: Cho Hun-hyun
- Succeeded by: Party dissolved

Secretary-General of the Liberty Korea Party
- In office 7 June 2017 – 6 July 2017
- Preceded by: Park Maeng-woo
- Succeeded by: Hong Moon-pyo

Personal details
- Born: February 28, 1961 (age 65) Doam-myeon, Pyeongchang-gun, Gangwon, South Korea
- Party: Future Korea
- Other political affiliations: United Future Party (2020) Liberty Korea Party (2017–2020); Saenuri Party (2017–2012); Grand National Party Democratic Party
- Spouse: Han In-suk (m. 2003)
- Children: 2
- Education: Catholic Kwandong University

Korean name
- Hangul: 염동열
- Hanja: 廉東烈
- RR: Yeom Dongyeol
- MR: Yŏm Tongyŏl

Yeom Dong-yeol (Korean: 염동열; Hanja: 廉東烈; born 28 February 1961) is a South Korean politician and a current member of the National Assembly.

== Early life and education ==
Yeom was born in Doam-myeon, Pyeongchang County, Gangwon, South Korea on February 28, 1961. He graduated from Catholic Kwandong University with a degree in business administration.

== Political career ==
Yeom ran for representative of Gangwon Pyeongchang County and Yeongwol County in 2000 as a member of the Democratic Party, but lost to Kim Yong-hak of the Grand National Party.

Yeom ran for the same district in 2010 during by-elections but lost to Choi Jong-won of the Democratic Party.

In 2012, Yeom ran for the same district once again and was elected with 56.61% of the vote. He was pro-Park Geun-hye.

In 2016, Yeom's constituency was reorganized, despite that he won his constituency again in the 2016 South Korean legislative election.

He assumed the position of Secretary-General of the Liberty Korea Party on June 7, 2017.

He has announced that he will not be running in the 2020 South Korean legislative election.

On March 19, 2020, he and three other United Future Party members including Won Yoo-chul defected to the Future Korea Party.

He became the second Secretary-General of the Future Korea Party on March 21, 2020; succeeding Cho Hun-hyun.

== Personal life ==
Yeom married his wife, Han In-sook in 2003. They have two sons.
