= Lee Su-jin (politician, born November 1969) =

South Korean politician

- 이수진
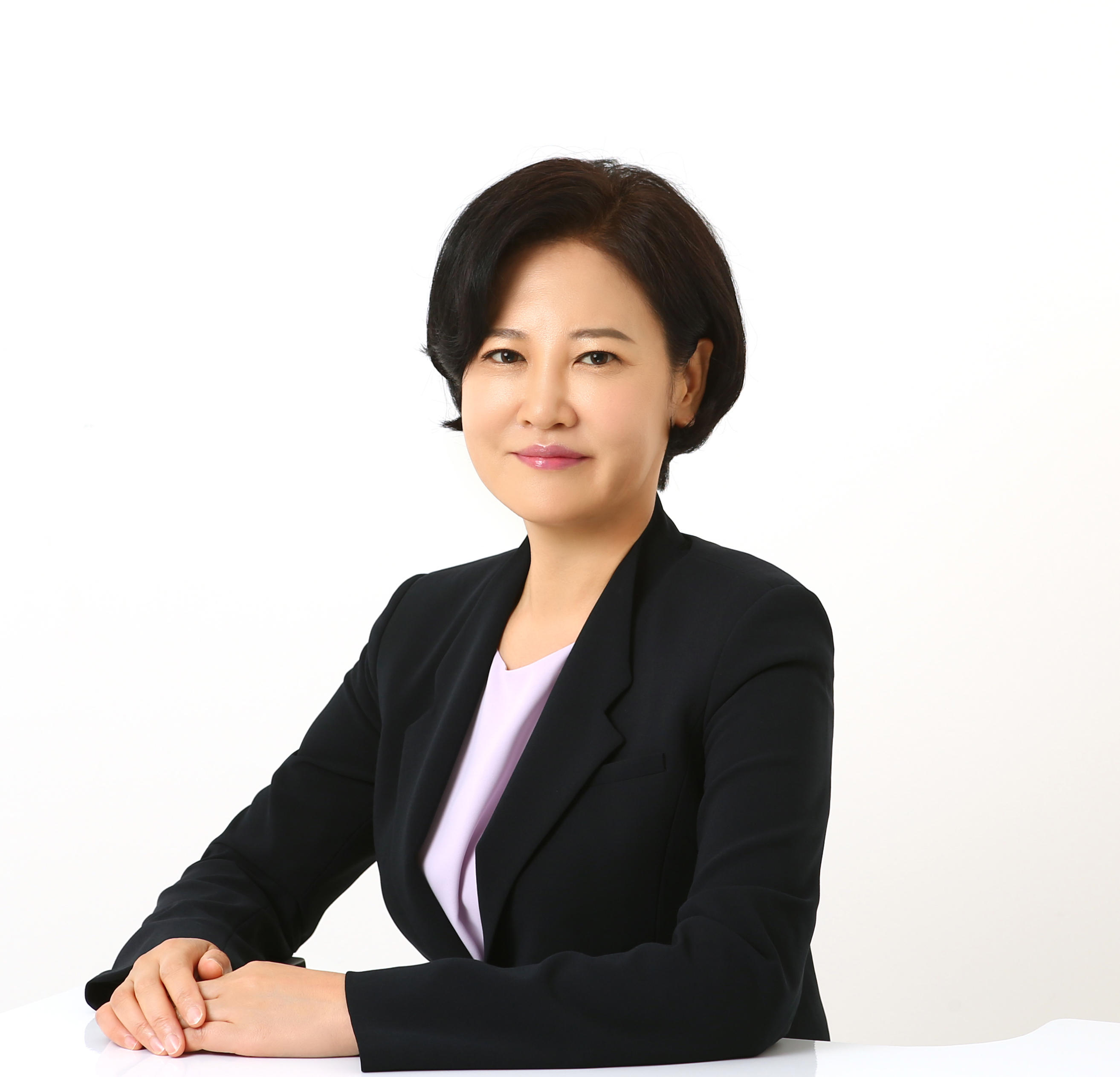
- Lee in 2020

Member of the National Assembly
- In office 30 May 2020 – 29 May 2024
- Preceded by: Na Kyung-won
- Succeeded by: Na Kyung-won
- Constituency: Seoul Dongjak B

Personal details
- Born: 3 November 1969 (age 56) Jeonju, North Jeolla, South Korea
- Party: Democratic (2020–2024); Independent (2024–)
- Education: Seoul National University
- Occupation: Judge, politician

Korean name
- Hangul: 이수진
- Hanja: 李秀眞
- RR: I Sujin
- MR: I Sujin

Lee Su-jin (Korean: 이수진, born 3 November 1969) is a South Korean judge and politician.

== Early life ==
Lee was born in Jeonju, North Jeolla in 1969. Her birthplace was usually rumoured as Nonsan. She grew up with a poor family, where she used to share a single room with 4 siblings. She lost her father when she was 11 years old. One day, her mother, who earned a living as a socks seller, slipped on an ice and underwent a hip osteonecrosis. Lee, who often cried for this, described her mum's problem on her diary. This story was reported by her primary school teachers to North Jeolla Daily. She later attended Jeonju Sungsim Girls' High School and earned a bachelor's degree in economics at Seoul National University in 1996.

== Legal career ==
After qualifying for the bar in 1998, Lee graduated from the Judicial Research and Training Institute in 2002. She began her career at Incheon District Court, then at Seoul High Court, Seoul Central District Court and Seoul Southern District Court. In 2011, she co-founded the Institute of International Human Rights Law.

She drew a public attention when she was in charge of the Cho Doo-soon Case in 2008. The 8-year-old victim was seriously injured and therefore had to wear a stoma bag. The prosecution was harshly criticised because of forcing the victim to summon and repeat her testimony. Her parents finally filed a lawsuit against the prosecution and Lee, as the judge in charge, ordered the prosecution to pay the victim 13 million won (≒ 13,000 US$) in damages.

== Political career ==
On 27 January 2020, Lee was brought to the ruling Democratic Party of Korea (DPK). From the interview, she expressed her advocation to jucial reform, as well as proposing bills to enrich people's livelihoods.

Prior to the 2020 election, Lee was a potential candidate for Dongjak 2nd constituency, where the incumbent MP is Na Kyung-won of the United Future Party (UFP). However, some other sources reported that perhaps the ruling party would put the ex-judge to Uiwang-Gwacheon constituency, where held by Shin Chang-hyun who lost at preselection. On 4 March, the Democratic Party has confirmed to nominate Lee as the official candidate for Dongjak 2nd, formally giving her way to contest with the UFP MP. Do Jong-hwan, who led the nomination, praised her as "a judge who really understand the minorities hardworking for fair judgements".

On 15 April, Lee successfully defeated the incumbent MP with a narrow margin.

== Controversies ==
=== Political neutrality ===
On 2 January 2020, shortly before quitting as a judge, Lee showed her intention to run for the upcoming general election should there is any chance while interviewing with JoongAng Ilbo. Her remark was criticised for breaching political neutrality and politicising the judiciary. It was reported she had submitted a resignation letter to the Supreme Court on 31 December 2019. Some of her colleagues also mentioned they were shocked when she made such decision.

=== Yang Sung-tae blacklist ===
On 27 January 2020, Lee disclosed that she was blacklisted by the former Chief Justice Yang Sung-tae. However, some sources reported her name was not on the list. Though she revealed she was demoted due to conflicts with the former Chief Justice, some other colleagues disclosed that she was incompetent and therefore not suitable to say "demoted".

Yang Hong-seok, a lawyer from People's Solidarity for Participatory Democracy, urged, "Please tell people how you were victimised by him. You're not explaining properly. This is same as you're treating people like a dog. I don't think you're actually victimised."

On 8 April, Lee was sued by her competitor, Na Kyung-won, for the publication of false information. Lee reacted, "Aren't you busy? Only people know the truth."

== Election results ==
=== General elections ===
Year	Elections	Constituency	Political party	Votes (%)	Remarks
2020	21st National Assembly General Election	Dongjak B (Seoul)	Democratic	61,407 (52.10%)	Won
