= Ki Dong-min =

South Korean politician

- 기동민

Member of the National Assembly
- In office 30 May 2016 – 24 May 2024
- Preceded by: Shin Gye-ryoon
- Succeeded by: Kim Nam-geun
- Constituency: Seongbuk B (Seoul)

Personal details
- Born: 23 February 1966 (age 60) Jangseong, South Jeolla, South Korea
- Citizenship: South Korean
- Party: Minjoo Party of Korea
- Education: Sungkyunkwan University

- Ki Dong-min
- Hangul: 기동민
- Hanja: 奇東旻
- RR: Gi Dongmin
- MR: Ki Tongmin

Ki Dong-min (Korean: 기동민; born 23 February 1966) is a South Korean politician in the liberal Minjoo Party of Korea, and since the April 2016 parliamentary election member-elect of the National Assembly for Seongbuk, Seoul.

Born in Jangseong County in South Jeolla, Ki studied journalism at Sungkyunkwan University, and was involved in the South Korean democratization movement as a student. He served as a parliamentary aide and policy advisor in the Ministry of Health and Welfare, before becoming deputy spokesman for the Democratic Party. Mayor Park Won-soon of Seoul appointed Ki his senior secretary for political affairs in 2011, then Vice Mayor for Political Affairs in 2012.

In the 2014 parliamentary by-elections, Ki was controversially nominated by the New Politics Alliance for Democracy, the Minjoo Party's predecessor, for the Dongjak B constituency in preference to his own friend and fellow democracy activist, Heo Dong-joon. Ki's selection provoked a widely publicized dispute between the two men, with Heo holding a week-long sit-in protest at the office of the party chairman in response. Despite being the frontrunner in opinion polling, Ki subsequently withdrew from the election to support Roh Hoe-chan of the Justice Party as a left-wing unity candidate. The by-election, held on July 30, was ultimately won by Na Kyung-won of the conservative Saenuri Party.

As a former aide, Ki is seen as close to Park Won-soon: during his candidature for the 2016 parliamentary elections, he was described as a "Park Won-soon man". His selection in the 2014 by-election was also widely ascribed to Park, though other commentators associated his nomination with then–party co-leader Kim Han-gil.

== Election results ==
Year	Elections	Constituency	Political party	Votes (%)	Results
2014	2014 By-election	Dongjak B (Seoul)	NPAD	-	Resigned
2016	20th National Assembly General Election	Seongbuk B (Seoul)	Democratic	40,834 (39.34%)	Won
2020	21st National Assembly General Election	Seongbuk B (Seoul)	Democratic	70,740 (59.35%)	Won
