= Seongbuk B =

Constituency in Seoul, South Korea

- Single-member constituency for the National Assembly
- Location of the constituency
- District(s): Seongbuk District (part)
- Region: Seoul
- Electorate: 180,743 (2020)

Current constituency
- Created: 1988
- Seats: 1
- Party: Democratic Party
- Member: Kim Nam-geun
- Created from: Seongbuk

Seongbuk B (Korean: 성북구 을) is a constituency of the National Assembly of South Korea. The constituency consists of portions of Seongbuk District, Seoul. As of 2020, 180,743 eligible voters were registered in the constituency. The constituency was created in 1988 from the Seongbuk constituency.

== History ==
Throughout its history, Seongbuk B has consistently elected members of centre-left, liberal parties to represent the constituency except for in the 1996 and 2008 South Korean legislative election, thus it is widely considered a safe district for the Democratic Party. Cho Yoon-hyung of the centrist-liberal Peace Democratic Party was the first member to represent the constituency. He was succeeded by Shin Gye-ryun of the centre-left Democratic Party, who won the constituency in the 1992 election. Shin's re-election bid in 1996 was unsuccessful, as he lost to Kang Sung-jae of the conservative New Korea Party. In the subsequent legislative election held in 2000, Shin won the constituency as a member of the liberal Millennium Democratic Party, beating out incumbent Kang Sung-jae in a return match. Shin left the Millennium Democratic Party in 2003 to join the Uri Party led by then President Roh Moo-hyun.

Prior to the 2004 legislative election, Shin had been under investigation for by South Korea's Supreme Prosecutor's Office for allegedly receiving illegal political campaign funds amounting to 300 million won. Despite the ongoing investigation, he successfully won re-election. However, Shin lost his seat in the National Assembly on February 10, 2006, for being sentenced to eight months in prison and two years of probation after he was found guilty of receiving illegal campaign funds. A by-election for the constituency was held on July 26, 2006, with Cho Soon-hyung of the liberal Democratic Party winning the election.

Kim Hyo-jae of the Grand National Party won the constituency in 2008, marking the last time a conservative, centre-right party won in Seongbuk B. The constituency's former member Shin Gye-ryun ran as an independent and came in second place, garnering 29% of the vote. In the following election held in 2012, Shin Gye-ryun ran as a member of the liberal Democratic United Party and won the election with 53.98% of the vote; returning as member of the National Assembly for Seongbuk B. However, in 2015, Shin was subject to another political scandal regarding legislation lobbying for the Seoul Arts College.

The Democratic Party nominated former Deputy Mayor of Seoul Ki Dong-min for the constituency in the 2016 legislative election. In the general election, Ki defeated former member for Seongbuk B Kim Hyo-jae of the Saenuri Party. Ki won re-election in 2020, defeating Jung Tae-geun of the United Future Party by more than twenty points.

== Boundaries ==
The constituency encompasses the neighborhoods of Donam 1-dong, Gireum 2-dong, Jongam-dong, Jangwi-dong, Hawolgok-dong, and Sangwolgok-dong.

== List of members of the National Assembly ==
Election	Member	Party	Dates	Notes
1988	Cho Yoon-hyung	Peace Democratic	1988–1992	Deputy Speaker of the National Assembly (1990–1992)
1992	Shin Gye-ryun	Democratic	1992–1996	
1996	Kang Sung-jae	New Korea	1996–2000	
2000	Shin Gye-ryun	Millennium Democratic	2000–2006 (Note: lost seat on February 10, 2006 after being found guilty of receiving illegal political campaign funds)	Deputy Mayor of Seoul (1998–1999) Lost seat on February 10, 2006, for receiving illegal political campaign funds
2004	Shin Gye-ryun	Uri	2000–2006	Deputy Mayor of Seoul (1998–1999) Lost seat on February 10, 2006, for receiving illegal political campaign funds
2006 by-election	Cho Soon-hyung	Democratic (Note: left the Democratic Party and joined the Liberty Forward Party on February 11, 2008)	2006–2008	
2008	Kim Hyo-jae	Grand National	2008–2012	
2012	Shin Gye-ryun	Democratic United	2012–2016	
2016	Ki Dong-min	Democratic	2016–2024	Deputy Mayor for Political Affairs Seoul (2012–2014)
2020	Ki Dong-min	Democratic	2016–2024	Deputy Mayor for Political Affairs Seoul (2012–2014)
2024	Kim Nam-geun	Democratic	2024–present	

== Election results ==
=== 2024 ===
Legislative Election 2024: Seongbuk B
Party	Candidate	Votes	%	±%
Democratic	Kim Nam-geun	68,872	56.82	▼2.53
People Power	Lee Sang-kyu	52,328	43.17	▲4.96
Rejected ballots		2,039	–	
Turnout		123,239	68.97	▲2.27
Registered electors		178,667		
Democratic hold		Swing		

=== 2020 ===
Legislative Election 2020: Seongbuk B
Party	Candidate	Votes	%	±%
Democratic	Ki Dong-min	70,740	59.35	▲20.01
United Future	Jung Tae-geun	45,543	38.21	▲5.76
Minjung	Pyun Jae-seung	2,060	1.72	new
National Revolutionary	Lim Kyung-ho	829	0.69	new
Rejected ballots		1,434	–	
Turnout		120,606	66.7	▲9.2
Registered electors		180,743		
Democratic hold		Swing		

=== 2016 ===
Legislative Election 2016: Seongbuk B
Party	Candidate	Votes	%	±%
Democratic	Ki Dong-min	40,934	39.34	▼14.64
Saenuri	Kim Hyo-jae	33,681	32.45	▼13.56
People	Kim In-won	22,392	21.57	new
Independent	Lee Kyung-ae	3,434	3.30	new
Justice	Park Chang-wan	2,218	2.13	new
Independent	Yang Gyu-hyeon	1,234	1.18	new
Rejected ballots		1,027	–	
Turnout		104,820	57.5	▲3.72
Registered electors		182,174		
Democratic hold		Swing		

=== 2012 ===
Legislative Election 2012: Seongbuk B
Party	Candidate	Votes	%	±%
Democratic United	Shin Gye-ryun	56,177	53.98	▲7.29
Saenuri	Suh Chan-kyo	47,879	46.01	▼1.24
Rejected ballots		1,183	–	
Turnout		105,239	53.78	▲9.55
Registered electors		195,678		
Democratic United gain from Saenuri				

=== 2008 ===
Legislative Election 2008: Seongbuk B
Party	Candidate	Votes	%	±%
Grand National	Kim Hyo-jae	38,322	47.25	▲7.18
Independent	Shin Gye-ryun	23,577	29.07	new
United Democratic	Park Chan-hee	14,293	17.62	▼26.68
New Progressive	Park Chang-wan	4,266	5.26	new
Family Party for Peace and Unity	Chung Jong-soo	638	0.78	new
Rejected ballots		896	–	
Turnout		81,992	44.23	▲15.34
Registered electors		185,356		
Grand National gain from Liberty Forward				

=== 2006 by-election ===
2006 by-election: Seongbuk B
Party	Candidate	Votes	%	±%
Democratic	Cho Soon-hyung	23,282	44.30	▲34.35
Grand National	Choi Soo-young	21,149	40.07	▲1.02
Uri	Cho Jae-hee	5,276	10.00	▼40.99
Democratic Labor	Park Chang-wan	2,975	5.64	new
Rejected ballots		141	–	
Turnout		52,923	28.89	▼31.03
Registered electors		183,174		
Democratic gain from Uri		Swing		

=== 2004 ===
Legislative Election 2004: Seongbuk B
Party	Candidate	Votes	%	±%
Uri	Shin Gye-ryun	54,979	50.99	new
Grand National	Choi Soo-young	42,101	39.05	▼0.97
Millennium Democratic	Park Chan-hee	10,728	9.95	▼42.26
Rejected ballots		1,460	–	
Turnout		109,268	59.92	▲4.40
Registered electors		182,346		
Uri hold		Swing		

=== 2000 ===
Legislative Election 2000: Seongbuk B
Party	Candidate	Votes	%	±%
Millennium Democratic	Shin Gye-ryun	50,644	52.21	new
Grand National Party	Kang Sung-jae	38,818	40.02	new
Youth Progressive	Mok Ji-young	4,198	4.32	new
United Liberal Democrats	Kim Ji-woon	3,335	3.43	▼8.09
Rejected ballots		831	–	
Turnout		97,826	55.52	▼4.22
Registered electors		176,192		
Millennium Democratic gain from Grand National		Swing		

=== 1996 ===
Legislative Election 1996: Seongbuk B
Party	Candidate	Votes	%	±%
New Korea	Kang Sung-jae	45,025	42.50	▲7.08
National Congress	Shin Gye-ryun	41,487	39.16	new
United Liberal Democrats	Choi Kap-su	12,209	11.52	new
Democratic	Hwang Ho-san	7,211	6.80	new
Rejected ballots		1,485	–	
Turnout		107,417	59.74	▼8.74
Registered electors		179,811		
New Korea gain from National Congress		Swing		

=== 1992 ===
Legislative Election 1992: Seongbuk B
Party	Candidate	Votes	%	±%
Democratic	Shin Gye-ryun	52,935	41.67	new
Democratic Liberal	Kang Sung-jae	44,999	35.42	new
Unification National	Lee Pil-sun	25,661	20.02	new
New Democratic Republican	Kim Yoo	16,833	12.90	new
New Political Reform	Song Soo-gang	3,423	2.69	new
Rejected ballots		1,468	–	
Turnout		128,486	68.48	▼0.66
Registered electors		187,639		
Democratic hold		Swing		

=== 1988 ===
Legislative Election 1988: Seongbuk B
Party	Candidate	Votes	%	±%
Peace Democratic	Cho Yoon-hyung	50,310	38.57	–
Democratic Justice	Kang Sung-jae	30,771	23.59	–
Reunification Democratic	Hyun Seung-il	30,600	23.46	–
New Democratic Republican	Kim Yoo	16,833	12.90	–
Hankyoreh Democratic	Lim Tae-baek	1,904	1.45	–
Rejected ballots		947	–	
Turnout		131,365	69.14	–
Registered electors		190,003		
Peace Democratic win (new seat)				

== See also ==
- List of constituencies of the National Assembly of South Korea
