= Jae-ho =

- Hangul: 재호
- RR: Jaeho
- MR: Chaeho

Jae-ho is a Korean given name.

People with this name include:

- Song Jae-ho (born 1937), South Korean actor
- Kim Jae-ho (judge) (born 1963), South Korean judge
- Hong Jae-ho (born 1968), South Korean rower
- Chun Jae-ho (born 1979), South Korean footballer
- Choiza (born Choi Jae-ho, 1980), South Korean rapper
- Kim Jae-ho (baseball) (born 1985), South Korean baseball player
- Jang Jae-ho (born 1986), South Korean professional gamer

== See also ==
- List of Korean given names
