= Park Sil =

South Korean politician (1939–2022)

Member of the National Assembly of South Korea
- In office 11 April 1985 – 29 May 1996
- Preceded by: Jo Jong-ho
- Succeeded by: Yoo Yong-tae
- Constituency: Dongjak (Seoul, 1985–1988); Dongjak B (Seoul, 1988–1996)

Personal details
- Born: 8 October 1939
- Died: 29 October 2022 (aged 83)
- Party: New Korean Democratic Party; Peace Democratic Party; Democratic Party; National Congress for New Politics
- Education: Seoul National University; University of Georgia
- Occupation: Journalist

Park Sil (Korean: 박실; 8 October 1939 – 29 October 2022) was a South Korean journalist and politician. A member of the New Korean Democratic Party, the Peace Democratic Party, the Democratic Party, and the National Congress for New Politics, he served in the National Assembly from 1985 to 1996.

Park died on 29 October 2022, at the age of 83.

== Election results ==
Year	Elections	Constituency	Political party	Votes (%)	Results
1985	12th National Assembly General Election	Dongjak (Seoul)	NKDP	89,665 (42.42%)	Won
1988	13th National Assembly General Election	Dongjak B (Seoul)	PDP	37,247 (40.81%)	Won
1992	14th National Assembly General Election	Dongjak B (Seoul)	Democratic	41,869 (40.73%)	Won
1996	15th National Assembly General Election	Dongjak B (Seoul)	NCNP	35,031 (36.65%)	Defeated (2nd)
