= Dongjak B =

Constituency in Seoul, South Korea

- Single-member constituency for the National Assembly
- Location of the constituency
- District(s): Dongjak District (part)
- Region: Seoul
- Electorate: 161,781 (2016)

Current constituency
- Created: 1988
- Seats: 1
- Party: People Power Party
- Member: Na Kyung-won
- Created from: Dongjak

Dongjak B (Korean: 동작구 을) is a constituency of the National Assembly of South Korea. The constituency consists of part of Dongjak District, Seoul. As of 2016, 161,781 eligible voters were registered in the constituency.

== List of members of the National Assembly ==
Election	Member	Party	Dates	Notes
1988	Park Sil	Peace Democratic	1988–1996	Secretary-General of the National Assembly (1998–2000)
1992	Park Sil	Democratic	1988–1996	Secretary-General of the National Assembly (1998–2000)
1996	Yoo Yong-tae	New Korea	1996–2004	Minister of Labor (2001–2002); Chief Secretary to the Millennium Democratic Party (2002); Floor leader of the Millennium Democratic Party (2003–2004)
2000	Yoo Yong-tae	Millennium Democratic	1996–2004	Minister of Labor (2001–2002); Chief Secretary to the Millennium Democratic Party (2002); Floor leader of the Millennium Democratic Party (2003–2004)
2004	Lee Kye-ahn	Uri	2004–2008	President and CEO of the Hyundai Motor Company (former); Chairman of Hyundai Capital (former); Chairman of Hyundai Card (former)
2008	Chung Mong-joon	Grand National	2008–2014	Chairman of Hyundai Heavy Industries (former); President of the Korea Football Association (1993–2009); Vice President of the FIFA (1994–2011); Chairman of the Grand National Party (2009–2010)
2012	Chung Mong-joon	Saenuri	2008–2014	Chairman of Hyundai Heavy Industries (former); President of the Korea Football Association (1993–2009); Vice President of the FIFA (1994–2011); Chairman of the Grand National Party (2009–2010)
2014	Na Kyung-won	Saenuri	2014–2020	Floor leader of the Liberty Korea Party (2018–2019)
2016	Na Kyung-won	Saenuri	2014–2020	Floor leader of the Liberty Korea Party (2018–2019)
2020	Lee Su-jin	Democratic	2020–2024	Left the Democratic Party on 22 February 2024
2024	Na Kyung-won	People Power	2024–present	

== Recent election results ==
=== 2024 ===
Legislative Election 2024: Dongjak B
Party	Candidate	Votes	%	±%
People Power	Na Kyung-won	62,720	54.01	▲8.97
Democratic	Ryu Sam-young	53,395	45.98	▼6.18
Rejected ballots		1,519	–	
Turnout		117,634	74.18	▲0.75
Registered electors		158,571		
People Power gain from Independent		Swing		

=== 2020 ===
Legislative Election 2020: Dongjak B
Party	Candidate	Votes	%	±%
Democratic	Lee Su-jin	61,407	52.2	+20.7
United Future	Na Kyung-won	53,026	45.0	+1.6
Justice Party	Lee Ho-yeong	2,334	2.0	new
Minjung Party	Choi Seo-hyeon	614	0.5	−0.1
National Revolutionary Dividends	Lee Ju-yang	345	0.3	new
Rejected ballots		1,274	–	–
Turnout		119,000	73.4	–
Registered electors		162,038		
Democratic gain from United Future		Swing		

=== 2016 ===
Legislative Election 2016: Dongjak B
Party	Candidate	Votes	%	±%
Saenuri	Na Kyung-won	44,457	43.4	−6.5
Democratic	Heo Dong-joon	32,212	31.5	new
People	Chang Jin-young	25,133	24.5	new
People's United	Lee Sang-hyun	610	0.6	new
Rejected ballots		1,789	–	–
Turnout		104,201	64.4	+17.6
Registered electors		161,781		
Saenuri hold		Swing		

=== 2014 (by-election) ===
By-election 2014: Dongjak B
Party	Candidate	Votes	%	±%
Saenuri	Na Kyung-won	38,311	49.9	−0.9
Justice	Roh Hoe-chan	37,382	48.7	new
Labor	Kim Jong-chul	1,076	1.4	−3.7
Rejected ballots		1,403	–	–
Turnout		78,172	46.8	−12.6
Registered electors		167,020		
Saenuri hold		Swing		

=== 2012 ===
Legislative Election 2012: Dongjak B
Party	Candidate	Votes	%	±%
Saenuri	Chung Mong-joon	46,480	50.8	−3.6
Democratic United	Lee Kye-ahn	40,293	44.0	+2.5
New Progressive	Kim Jong-chul	4,708	5.1	+3.1
Rejected ballots		500	–	–
Turnout		91,981	59.4	+2.6
Registered electors		154,966		
Saenuri hold		Swing		

=== 2008 ===
Legislative Election 2008: Dongjak B
Party	Candidate	Votes	%	±%
Grand National	Chung Mong-joon	47,521	54.4	+17.9
Democratic	Chung Dong-young	36,251	41.5	new
New Progressive	Kim Jong-chul	1,758	2.0	new
Democratic Labor	Kim Ji-hee	1,060	1.2	−4.5
Christian	Na Yong-jip	400	0.5	new
Family Federation	Ok Yoon-ho	291	0.3	new
Unification	Chung Youn-joong	51	0.1	new
Rejected ballots		461	–	–
Turnout		87,793	56.8	−7.2
Registered electors		154,470		
Grand National gain from Democratic		Swing		

== See also ==
- List of constituencies of the National Assembly of South Korea
