= Choo Hye-seon =

South Korean politician (born 1971)

- 추혜선

Member of the National Assembly
- In office 30 May 2016 – 30 May 2020
- Constituency: Proportional representation

Personal details
- Born: 15 January 1971 (age 55)
- Party: Democratic Party of Korea
- Other political affiliations: Justice Party (2012–2025); Unified Progressive Party (2011–2012); Solidarity for New Progressive Integration (2011); New Progressive Party (2008–2011)

Korean name
- Hangul: 추혜선
- RR: Chu Hyeseon
- MR: Ch'u Hyesŏn

Choo Hye-seon (Korean: 추혜선, born 15 January 1971) is a South Korean journalist and politician. She served as a member of the 20th National Assembly, having been elected via proportional representation for the Justice Party in the 2016 South Korean legislative election. Prior to her parliamentary service, she held positions including Director of External Relations for the SBS branch of the National Union of Mediaworkers, Secretary-General of the Citizens' Coalition for Media Reform, policy advisor to the Korea Communications Commission, and head of the Justice Party's Media Reform Committee.

== Career ==
She began her career in the media activism sector while working as a factory laborer, an official for the Korea Federation of Artists & Performers Organisations, a union official at KBS Gwangju, and a reporter for the Sokcho Shinmun. She became a union official at SBS, on the recommendation of Choi Moon-soon, who was serving as the chairman of the Federation of Media Unions at the time. Later, she served as the Secretary-General of the Citizens' Coalition for Media Reform and as a policy advisor to the Korea Communications Commission; she was subsequently recruited into the Justice Party by Sim Sang-jung to lead the party's media reform committee. She ran in the Justice Party's proportional representation primary, securing the number three position, and was elected to the 20th National Assembly in April 2016.

== Political history ==
Between September 2016 and April 2018, she served as a member of the Science, ICT, Broadcasting and Communications Committee. She was appointed in April 2018 as committee secretary for the Peace and Justice parliamentary negotiating group for the Science, ICT, Broadcasting and Communications Committee and the Gender Equality and Family Committee.

Between May 2016 and July 2017 she served as a spokesperson for the Justice Party and in July 2017 became the party's chief spokesperson.

On 2 September 2017 she was appointed Chairperson of the Committee on Small and Medium Business and Self-Employed. In July 2018 she was appointed as Head of the Fair Economy and People's Livelihood Headquarters. In September 2018, she became Senior Deputy Floor Leader of the Justice Party and she left the role in May 2020.

In 2019 she became Anyang Dongan-eul Regional Committee (Gyeonggi Province Chapter) chairperson.

In the 2020 South Korean legislative election, she ran as the Justice Party candidate for Anyang Dongan-eul. However, she was not elected.

On 22 January 2025, she, alongside Bae Jin-gyo and Yoon So-ha, joined the Democratic Party.

On 17 February 2025, Lee Jae-myung appointed Choo as a special advisor on people's livelihoods.

In June 2025, Choo was appointed as a member of the Social Affairs Subcommittee II of the State Affairs Planning Committee. The committee completed its work on the 14 August 2025.

== Election history ==
Year	Election	Assembly	Position	Constituency	Party	Votes	Vote share	Rank	Result	Notes
2016	General election	20th	Member of the National Assembly	Proportional representation	Justice Party	1,719,891	7.23%	3rd on party list	Elected	First term
2020	General election	21st	Member of the National Assembly	Anyang Dongan B (Gyeonggi)	Justice Party	2,980	3.24%	3rd	Not elected	

== See also ==
- List of members of the National Assembly (South Korea), 2016–2020
- Justice Party
- 2016 South Korean legislative election
- 2020 South Korean legislative election
