= Jang Dong-hyeok =

South Korean politician (born 1969)

- 장동혁
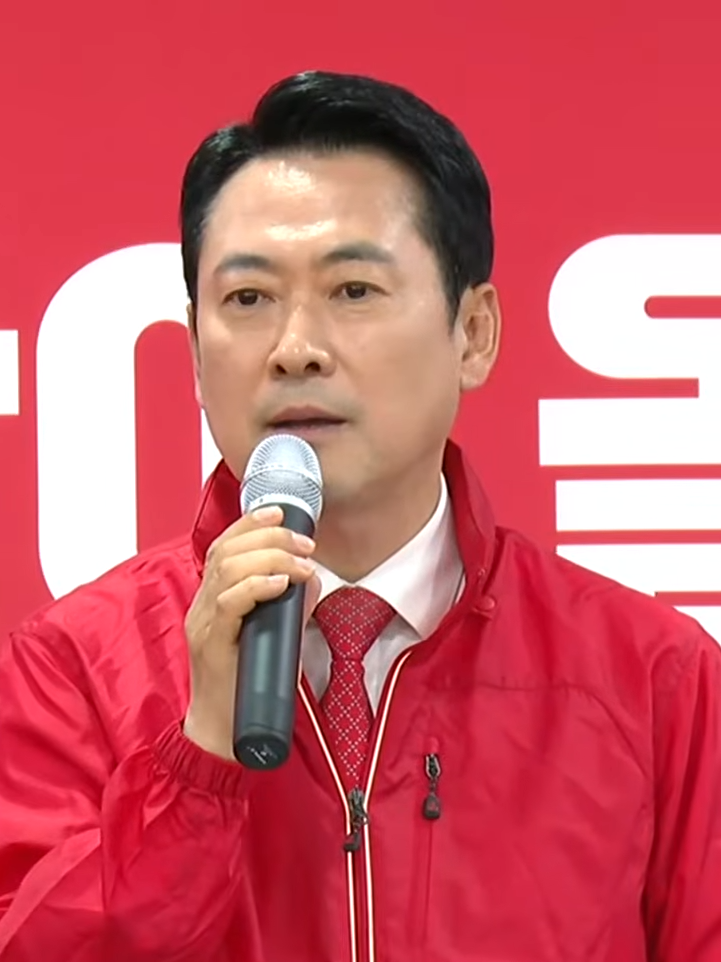
- Jang in 2026

Leader of the People Power Party
- Incumbent
- Assumed office 26 August 2025
- Preceded by: Song Eon-seok (ERC)

Member of the National Assembly
- Incumbent
- Assumed office 2 June 2022
- Constituency: Boryeong–Seocheon (South Chungcheong)

Personal details
- Born: 2 June 1969 (age 57)
- Party: People Power
- Education: Seoul National University (BA); UCLouvain (LLM)

Jang Dong-hyeok (Korean: 장동혁; Hanja: 張東赫; born 2 June 1969) is a South Korean politician who has served as the leader of the People Power Party since 2025. He has served as a member of the National Assembly since 2020, representing Boryeong–Seocheon.

He was once considered 'Pro-Han', which means he advocated for Han Dong-hoon. During the 2024 South Korean martial law crisis and impeachment of Yoon Suk Yeol, however, he opposed the impeachment of Yoon.

In August 2025, he was elected as the 4th leader of the People Power Party and simultaneously assumed the position of chairman of the Yeouido Institute. Under his leadership, the party suffered major losses in the 2026 local elections, but maintained control of Seoul.

== Election results ==
Year	Elections	Constituency	Political party	Votes (%)	Results
2020	21st National Assembly General Election	Yuseong A (Daejeon)	UFP	39,588 (40.34%)	Defeated (2nd)
2022	June 2022 By-election	Boryeong–Seocheon (South Chungcheong)	PPP	39,960 (51.01%)	Won
2024	22nd National Assembly General Election	Boryeong–Seocheon (South Chungcheong)	PPP	46,505 (51.50%)	Won
