= Kim Seong-hwan =

South Korean artist and cartoonist (1932–2019)

- Born: October 8, 1932; Kaesong, South Korea
- Died: September 9, 2019 (aged 86); Busan, South Korea
- Education: Kyung Hee University

Korean name
- Hangul: 김성환
- Hanja: 金星煥
- RR: Gim Seonghwan
- MR: Kim Sŏnghwan

Art name
- Hangul: 고바우
- RR: Gobau
- MR: Kobau

Kim Seong-hwan (8 October 1932 – 9 September 2019) was a South Korean artist and cartoonist, notable for having created and perpetuated the longest-running comic strip in Korea. Kim is also known by his pen name, which is Gobau ("strong rock"). The pseudonym dates from the summer of 1950 when he was trying to avoid getting into trouble with North Korea troops in Seoul.

== War artist ==
In 1950, Kim was an 18-year-old student and a part-time magazine illustrator. When North Korean forces surged south, his drawings recorded the events which were happening around him. Kim sketched refugees and soldiers who were fleeing the onslaught of North Korean troops.

This sketch by war artist Kim Seong-hwan, titled Near Donam Bridge, depicts refugees fleeing Seoul in June 1950 during early days of the Korean War.

His artwork is a visual account of the lives of civilians swept up in the periphery of the Korean War.

After Seoul was liberated in September 1950, Kim was employed as a war artist by the South Korean Ministry of Defense.

== Comic strip ==
Kim Seong-hwan worked for various publications during the Korean war; and his career flourished in the decades which followed.

Kim's most notable creation was the character "Gobau", who first appeared in Dong-A Ilbo in 1955. This comic figure is old man with round eyes, big nose, mustache and with a single tuft of hair on top of his head. The adventures of this irrepressible and laconic old man appeared in 14,139 episodes across the span of 50 years. This became the longest-running Korean comic strip.

Kim's sense of humor was sometimes provocative. For example, the comic strip caused an uproar when he drew prime-minister Jang Taek-sang bitten by a dog. Another time in 1958, Kim was imprisoned by Syngman Rhee's regime for a satirical comic he drew regarding the presidential Blue House, showing people carrying buckets of manure out of the building. Afterwards, Rhee's second-in-command Lee Ki-poong attempted to make peace with Kim, and requested that Kim draw Rhee's life story. However, Kim rejected that request.
