= Jeong Jeom-sig =

South Korean politician (born 1965)

- 정점식
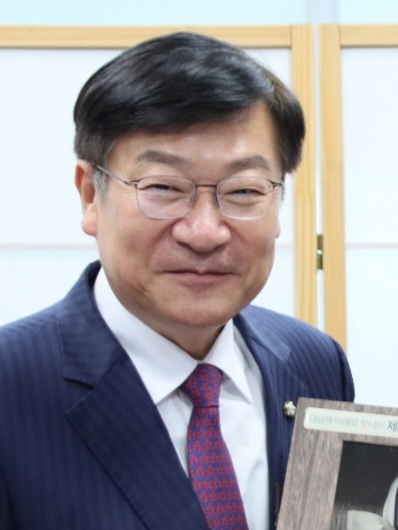

Floor Leader of the People Power Party
- Incumbent
- Assumed office 10 June 2026
- Preceded by: Song Eon-seok

Member of the National Assembly
- Incumbent
- Assumed office 4 April 2019
- Preceded by: Lee Gun-hyeon
- Constituency: Tongyeong–Goseong (South Gyeongsang)

Personal details
- Born: 15 July 1965 (age 61) Goseong County, South Gyeongsang, South Korea
- Party: People Power
- Education: Seoul National University
- Occupation: Prosecutor; Lawyer

Korean name
- Hangul: 정점식
- Hanja: 鄭点植
- RR: Jeong Jeomsik
- MR: Chŏng Chŏmsik

Jeong Jeom-sig (Korean: 정점식; born 15 July 1965) is a South Korean politician and former prosecutor who has served as the floor leader of the People Power Party since 2026. He has represented Tongyeong–Goseong in the National Assembly since 2019.

== Life ==
Jeong was born in Goseong County, South Gyeongsang Province. He passed the 30th judicial examination in 1986. He later served as a high-level prosecutor at the prosecution office before retiring in June 2017. He later opened as a lawyer.

In 2019, he ran in the Tongyeong-Goseong by-election with the Liberty Korea Party's nomination.

== Election results ==
Year	Elections	Constituency	Political party	Votes (%)	Results
2019	2019 By-Election	Tongyeong–Goseong (South Gyeongsang)	LKP	47,082 (59.47%)	Won
2020	21st National Assembly General Election	Tongyeong–Goseong (South Gyeongsang)	UFP	60,314 (58.34%)	Won
2024	22nd National Assembly General Election	Tongyeong–Goseong (South Gyeongsang)	PPP	61,251 (61.45%)	Won
