= Mun Mi-ock =

South Korean politician (born 1968)

- 문미옥

1st Vice Minister of Science and ICT
- In office 14 December 2018 – 18 December 2019
- President: Moon Jae-in
- Prime Minister: Lee Nak-yeon
- Minister: Yoo Yeong-min; Choi Ki-young
- Preceded by: Lee Jin-kyu
- Succeeded by: Jeong Byun-sun

Advisor to the President for Science and Technology
- In office 20 June 2017 – 13 December 2018
- President: Moon Jae-in
- Preceded by: Position established
- Succeeded by: Lee Kong-joo

Member of the National Assembly
- In office 30 May 2016 – 20 June 2017
- Constituency: Proportional representation

Personal details
- Born: 20 December 1968 (age 57)
- Party: Rebuilding Korea
- Education: POSTECH

Mun Mi-ock (Korean: 문미옥; Hanja: 文美玉; born 20 December 1968) is a former South Korean research professor at Yonsei University and Ewha Womans University serving as the President of Science and Technology Policy Institute from January 2021. Mun previously served as President Moon Jae-in's first Science and Technology Advisor and his second Vice Minister of Science and ICT - the first woman to assume both posts respectively.

Before entering politics and after leaving academia, Mun had led Planning and Policy Division of Center for Women in Science, Engineering, and Technology (WISET) from 2011 and Science Engineering Technology Cooperative (SETCOOP) from 2013 - both policy instruments of the Ministry to support Korean scientists and innovations.

Mun was the last person recruited by then-party leader Moon Jae-in for the 2016 general election. Mun received the number 7 on her party's proportional representation list.

In 2017 Mun was appointed to the newly created post, an advisor to the president for science and technology, automatically losing her seat at the parliament which was taken by Lee Soo Hyuck, now-South Korean ambassador to the United States. In 2018 she was reshuffled to Moon's second vice minister of science and ICT.

After leaving the Ministry in 2019, Mun then applied to become her party's candidate for Songpa A constituency for upcoming 2020 general election but lost. In January 2021 Mun was brought back to lead one of government-funded research institutes, the Science and Technology Policy Institute.

Mun holds three degrees in physics from a bachelor to a doctorate from POSTECH. She also completed postdoctoral research programmes in physics at Ewha Womans University and Yonsei University both at which she later worked as research professor.

== Electoral history ==
Election	Year	District	Party affiliation	Votes	Percentage of votes	Results
20th National Assembly General Election	2016	Proportional representation (7th)	Democratic Party	6,069,744	25.54%	Elected
