= Kim Yong-tae (politician) =

South Korean politician (born 1990)

- 김용태
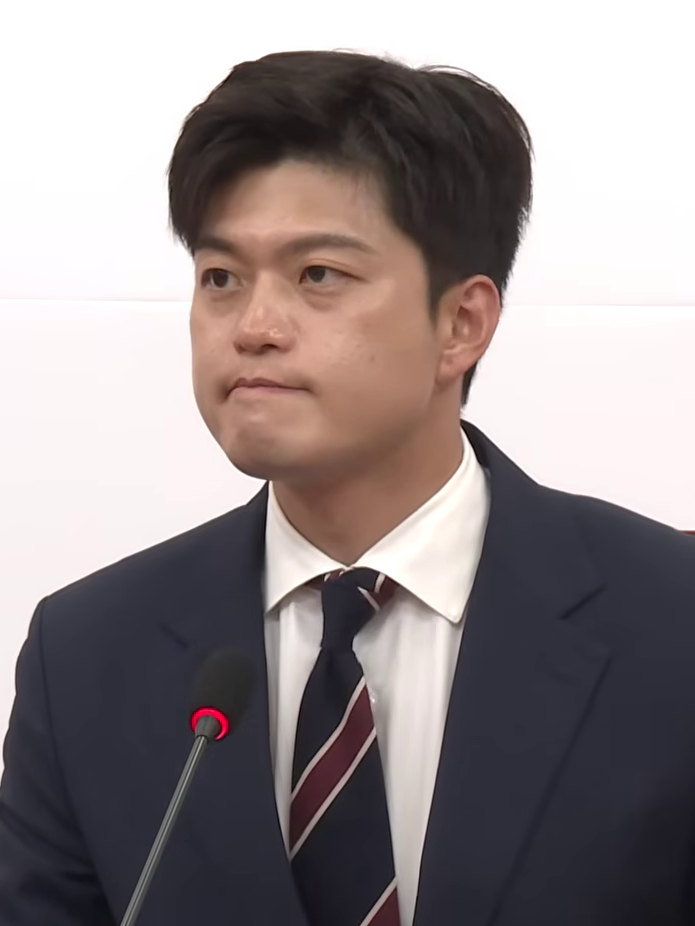
- Kim in 2025

Member of the National Assembly
- Incumbent
- Assumed office 30 May 2024

Acting Leader of the People Power
- In office 15 May 2025 – 30 June 2025
- Preceded by: Kwon Young-se; Kweon Seong-dong (ERC)
- Succeeded by: Song Eon-seok (ERC)

Personal details
- Born: 21 October 1990 (age 36)
- Party: People Power (since 2020)

Kim Yong-tae (Korean: 김용태; born 21 October 1990) is a South Korean politician serving as a member of the National Assembly since 2024. He served as the acting leader of the People Power Party from May to June 2025.

== Election results ==
Year	Elections	Constituency	Political party	Votes (%)	Results
2020	21st National Assembly General Election	Gwangmyeong B (Gyeonggi)	UFP	29,671 (30.51%)	Defeated (2nd)
2024	22nd National Assembly General Election	Pocheon–Gapyeong (Gyeonggi)	PPP	3,121 (50.47%)	Won

=== Local elections ===
==== Seoul Songpa Council ====
Year	Elections	Constituency	Political party	Votes (%)	Remarks
2018	7th Iocal Election	Seoul Songpa 5th	Independent	437,583 (8.82%)	Defeated
