= Song Eon-seok =

South Korean politician

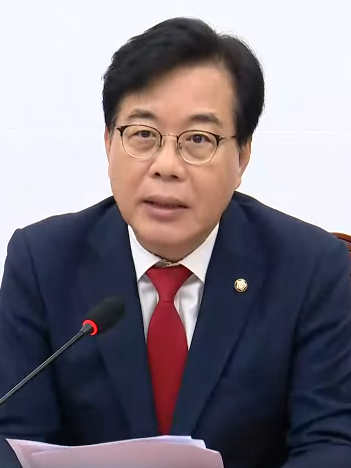
- Song in 2025

Chairman of the People Power Party Emergency Response Committee
- In office 30 June 2025 – 26 August 2025
- Preceded by: Kim Yong-tae (acting)
- Succeeded by: Jang Dong-hyeok

Floor Leader of the People Power Party
- In office 16 June 2025 – 10 June 2026
- Preceded by: Park Hyeong-su (acting)
- Succeeded by: Jeong Jeom-sig

Member of the National Assembly
- Incumbent
- Assumed office 13 June 2018

Personal details
- Born: 16 May 1963 (age 63) Gimcheon, South Korea
- Party: People Power
- Education: Seoul National University (BA, MD); State University of New York (PhD)

Korean name
- Hangul: 송언석
- RR: Song Eonseok
- MR: Song Ŏnsŏk

Song Eon-seok (Korean: 송언석) is a South Korean politician who has served as a member of the National Assembly since 2018. A member of the People Power Party, he served as the party's floor leader from June 2025 to June 2026.

== Biography ==
Song was born on 16 May 1963, in Gimcheon, North Gyeongsang Province. Song got a bachelor's degree in law and a master's degree from Seoul National University. He also got a doctoral degree in economics from the State University of New York. Sung was formerly the Vice Minister of Finance.

Song was first elected to the National Assembly in the 20th general election, and he has served 3 terms since then. In June 2025, Song was elected Floor Leader of the People Power Party. In the Floor Leader election, Sung received 60 of the 106 votes. Song was the interim chairman of the People Power Party Emergency Committee from June 2025 to the 2025 People Power Party National Convention.

== Election results ==
Year	Elections	Constituency	Political party	Votes (%)	Results
2018	2018 By-Election	Gimcheon (North Gyeongsang)	LKP	39,323 (50.32%)	Won
2020	21st National Assembly General Election	Gimcheon (North Gyeongsang)	UFP	59,993 (75.42%)	Won
2024	22nd National Assembly General Election	Gimcheon (North Gyeongsang)	PPP	51,208 (65.78%)	Won
