= Na Kyung-won =

South Korean judge and politician

- 나경원
- Na in 2016

Member of the National Assembly
- Incumbent
- Assumed office 30 May 2024
- Preceded by: Lee Su-jin
- Constituency: Seoul Dongjak B
- In office 31 July 2014 – 29 May 2020
- Preceded by: Chung Mong-joon
- Succeeded by: Lee Soo-jin
- Constituency: Seoul Dongjak B
- In office 30 May 2008 – 28 September 2011
- Preceded by: Park Seong-beom
- Succeeded by: Jeong Ho-jun
- Constituency: Seoul Jung
- In office 30 May 2004 – 29 May 2008
- Constituency: Proportional representation

Personal details
- Born: 6 December 1963 (age 62) Seoul, South Korea
- Party: People Power
- Other political affiliations: GNP/LKP
- Education: Seoul National University
- Religion: Catholicism

Korean name
- Hangul: 나경원
- Hanja: 羅景垣
- RR: Na Gyeongwon
- MR: Na Kyŏngwŏn

Na Kyung-won (Korean: 나경원, born 6 December 1963) is a South Korean judge and politician. She is a member of the conservative People Power Party. She has been a member of the National Assembly since 2004. From December 2018 to December 2019 she was the parliamentary leader of the Liberty Korea Party, the first woman to hold the position.

== Early life and education ==
Na was born on December 6, 1963, in Seoul, South Korea. She graduated from Seoul National University with a bachelor's and a master's degree in law, and completed a doctoral program in international law at the same university.

== Career ==
In 1995, Na became a judge for administrative courts of South Korea. She started her political career as a special aide for women's affairs to Lee Hoi-chang for the 2002 presidential election. She was one of two candidates of the October 2011 Seoul mayoral by-election after Oh Se-hoon resigned his position as mayor, but lost the election to Park Won-soon.

Na did not run in the 2012 legislative election due to allegations that her husband Kim Jae-ho was involved in a clandestine deal with a prosecutor from the Supreme Prosecutors' Office. She subsequently ran as a candidate for Dongjak B in a July 2014 by-election, and beat the Justice Party's Roh Hoe-chan by 929 votes.

Outside of politics, Na began working in sports in 2005. She became the president of Special Olympics Korea in 2005 and the Korean Wheelchair Rugby Association in 2006. In 2009, Na was selected to the Korean Paralympic Committee and elected vice president of the KPC in 2013. Also in 2013, Na was named onto the International Paralympic Committee and reelected in 2017.

In December 2018, Na was elected parliamentary floor leader of the main opposition party., the first woman in the country to hold this position. In February 2019, she warned that if the US could not get North Korea to denuclearize, Seoul would probably order more nuclear weaponry to level up to its northern counterpart.

She lost her Dongjak B seat to Lee Su-jin in the 2020 legislative election. On 13 January 2021, she announced to run for Mayor of Seoul in the 2021 South Korean by-elections but lost to Oh Se-hoon in the primaries.

In 2025, Na declared her candidacy for the 2025 South Korean presidential election, but lost in the primaries held by the People Power Party.

== Controversies ==
On September 26, 2011, Na Kyung-won visited a facility related to the severely disabled and was criticized socially for taking off the clothes of a severely disabled teenager and bathing naked in front of reporters. Human rights groups for the disabled also criticized Na Kyung-won.

On 15 April 2019, during a protest, progressive college students occupied the office of Na Kyung-won.

In September 2019, it was reported by local media that Na's son had allegedly received preferential treatment while in high school after he was listed as the first author in a paper's research summary. The paper was subsequently presented at a medical engineering conference at Seoul National University. Na stated that she finds the allegations "regrettable" and that her son "conducted the experiments himself and wrote about it."

== Personal life ==
Na Kyung-won is married to judge Kim Jae-ho and they have two children. Their daughter has Down syndrome.

== Election results ==
Year	Elections	Constituency	Political party	Votes (%)	Results
2004	17th National Assembly General Election	Proportional representation (11st)	GNP	7,613,660 (35.76%)	Elected
2008	18th National Assembly General Election	Jung (Seoul)	GNP	23,609 (47.60%)	Won
2014	2014 By-election	Dongjak B (Seoul)	Saenuri	38,311 (49.90%)	Won
2016	20th National Assembly General Election	Dongjak B (Seoul)	Saenuri	44,457 (43.40%)	Won
2020	21st National Assembly General Election	Dongjak B (Seoul)	UFP	53,026 (45.04%)	Defeated (2nd)
2024	22nd National Assembly General Election	Dongjak B (Seoul)	PPP	62,720 (54.01%)	Won

=== Local elections ===
==== Mayor of Seoul ====
Year	Elections	Constituency	Political party	Votes (%)	Remarks
2011	2011 By-election	Seoul (Mayoral Elections)	GNP	1,867,880 (46.21%)	Defeated (2nd)
