= Hwang Young-cheul =

South Korean politician (born 1965)

Hwang Young-cheul (Korean: 황영철, born 13 July 1965) is a politician of South Korea and currently one of the member of parliament of Hongcheon County, Cheorwon County, Hwacheon County, Yanggu County and Inje County.

== Biography ==
Born at Hongcheon County, Gangwon Province. He started his political career in 1995, by elected as one of the member of state council of Gangwon-do. He was re-elected in 1998.

In 2000, he ran for the member of parliament for Hongcheon-Hwaengsung, but defeated. His challenge was repeated in 2004, but the result was same. However, when he ran again in 2008, he was finally elected and also in 2012.

In 2016, he was elected again with the new constituency - Hongcheon-Cheorwon-Hwacheon-Yanggu-Inje.

During the period of the impeachment of the president Park Geun-hye, he was one of the member for hearings, along with Chang Je-won and Kwon Sung-dong. And he left Saenuri Party and joined for Bareun Party, on 23 December 2016.

== Controversy ==
=== Corruption scandal ===
When he was elected as a member of parliament in 2016, he was arrested due to a corruption scandal. At the first trial, he was sentenced a penalty for 700,000 won. He then, was appealed for high court by the attorney, although the result was same. On the other hand, as those who're sentenced less than 1 million won can continue their positions, he had no problem to keep his membership.

=== Leaving from Bareun Party ===
On 2 May 2017, 14 members of the Bareun Party declared that they would return to Liberty Korea Party (formerly Saenuri Party) and support Hong Joon-pyo as the future president, rather than Yoo Seong-min. Hwang was one of them, however, suddenly cancelled the returning. The reason was that the returning of them was strongly opposed by pro-Parks in LKP.

However, later than, he spoke up to combine Bareun with LKP, and finally returned to LKP on the November of the year.

== Election results ==
=== General elections ===
Year	Elections	Constituency	Political party	Votes (%)	Results
2000	16th National Assembly General Election	Hongcheon–Hoengseong (Gangwon)	GNP	18,898 (31.50%)	Defeated (2nd)
2004	17th National Assembly General Election	Hongcheon–Hoengseong (Gangwon)	GNP	23,532 (41.95%)	Defeated (2nd)
2008	18th National Assembly General Election	Hongcheon–Hoengseong (Gangwon)	GNP	26,021 (49.23%)	Won
2012	19th National Assembly General Election	Hongcheon–Hoengseong (Gangwon)	Saenuri	29,942 (51.80%)	Won
2016	20th National Assembly General Election	Hongcheon–Cheorwon–Hwacheon–Yanggu–Inje (Gangwon)	Saenuri	50,733 (50.39%)	Won

=== Local elections ===
==== Gangwon Province Council ====
Year	Elections	Constituency	Political party	Votes (%)	Remarks
1995	1st Iocal Election	Gangwon Hongcheon 1st	DLP	-	Not Vote Won
1998	2nd Iocal Election	Gangwon Hongcheon 1st	GNP	10,126 (61.35%)	Won

==== Gangwon Hongcheon County Council ====
Year	Elections	Constituency	Political party	Votes (%)	Remarks
1991	1991 Iocal Election	Gangwon Hongcheon Hongcheon-eup	Independent	4,031 (32.73%)	Won
