= Kim Jae-ho (judge) =

South Korean judge (born 1963)

- Born: December 4, 1963 (age 61); Seoul, South Korea
- Occupation: Judge
- Spouse: Na Kyung-won
- Children: 2

- Kim Jae-ho
- Hangul: 김재호
- RR: Gim Jaeho
- MR: Kim Chaeho

Kim Jae-ho (born 1963) is a South Korean judge who is the husband of Na Kyung-won, a conservative politician. He graduated from Seoul National University. Kim was admitted to the judicial exam in 1989 and became a judge in 1992. Since 2025, Kim has been serving as the Chief Judge of the Chuncheon District Court in Gangwon Province

== Prosecution Dispute ==
Kim was involved in unjustifiably indicting a blogger who criticized his wife, Na Kyung-won. Na Kyung-won had initially denied any allegation.
