= People Power Party =

Conservative political party in South Korea

People Power Party 국민의힘
- Abbreviation: PPP
- Leader: Jang Dong-hyeok
- Founded: 17 February 2020; 6 years ago (as the United Future Party); 31 August 2020; 6 years ago (current form)
- Merger of: Liberty Korea Party; New Conservative Party; Onward for Future 4.0... and others: Future Korea Party (merged on 29 May 2020); People Party (merged on 18 April 2022); Transition Korea (merged on 9 November 2023); People Future Party (merged on 26 April 2024)
- Headquarters: 12, Gukhoe-Daero 74 Street, Yeouido-dong, Yeongdeungpo-gu, Seoul
- Think tank: The Yeouido Research Institute
- Youth wing: 청년의힘 (Youth Power)
- Membership (2023): ▲4,449,281
- Ideology: Conservatism (South Korean) (Note: Attributed to multiple sources:); South Korean nationalism; Right-wing populism; Factions: Authoritarian conservatism
- Political position: Right-wing (Note: Attributed to multiple sources:) to far-right (Note: Attributed to multiple sources:)
- Regional affiliation: Asia Pacific Democracy Union
- International affiliation: International Democracy Union
- Satellite party: Future Korea Party (2020); People Future Party (2024)
- Colours: Red (Note: Historically (pink) as the United Future Party)
- National Assembly: 109 / 300
- Metropolitan Mayors and Governors: 4 / 16
- Municipal Mayors: 94 / 227
- Provincial and Metropolitan Councillors: 328 / 933
- Municipal Councillors: 1,276 / 3,034

Party flag

Website
- peoplepowerparty.kr

- People Power Party
- Hangul: 국민의힘
- Hanja: 國民의힘
- RR: Gungminui him
- MR: Kungminŭi him

United Future Party
- Hangul: 미래통합당
- Hanja: 未來統合黨
- RR: Mirae tonghapdang
- MR: Mirae t'onghaptang

The People Power Party (PPP; Korean: 국민의힘; lit. 'Power of Nationals') is a conservative and right-wing populist political party in South Korea. It is the second-largest party in the National Assembly. The PPP, along with its historic rival the Democratic Party, make up the two largest political parties in South Korea.

The PPP was founded as the United Future Party (UFP) on 17 February 2020 through the merger of the Liberty Korea Party, New Conservative Party, and Onward for Future 4.0, as well as several minor parties and political organizations. It contested the 2020 legislative election together with its satellite party, the Future Korea Party; the alliance achieved the worst conservative result since 1960. The party renamed to the People Power Party on 31 August 2020. It achieved electoral success in the 2021 by-elections. In 2022, PPP presidential candidate Yoon Suk Yeol was elected as the president of South Korea, followed by PPP victories in the 2022 local elections. Due to the unpopularity of the Yoon administration, the party lost the 2024 legislative election. Yoon declared martial law in December 2024, prompting his impeachment. In 2025, PPP candidate Kim Moon-soo lost the presidential election to Democratic Party candidate Lee Jae Myung, returning PPP to the opposition.

The PPP is generally seen as right-wing and conservative. It supports economic liberalism and fiscal conservatism, and has been described as socially conservative, hostile towards feminism and communism. It favors strengthening South Korea's alliance with the United States, as well as improving relations with Japan. The PPP takes a hawkish stance towards North Korea, as well as an ambiguous stance on relations with China.

== History ==
=== Background ===
Due to the political scandal in 2016, President Park Geun-hye was impeached, and several members of parliament (MPs) quit the then-ruling Liberty Korea Party (LKP) to form the Bareun Party. Following the impeachment of Park on 10 March 2017, the LKP de jure lost its ruling party position. After the Democratic presidential candidate Moon Jae-in was elected on 9 May, the LKP officially became the main opposition. Although several Bareun MPs returned to the LKP, the party did not fully recover, losing ground in the 2018 local elections. The LKP president, Hong Joon-pyo, resigned to take responsibility for the defeat. The Bareunmirae Party, formed from a merger between the Bareun Party and the smaller, centrist People's Party, also faced a defeat in the 2018 local elections.

The two conservative parties held snap leadership elections. On 2 September 2018, the Bareunmirae Party elected Sohn Hak-kyu as its new president. On 27 February 2019, the Liberty Korea Party elected former Prime Minister Hwang Kyo-ahn as its new leader. Lee Un-ju, a Bareunmirae MP, quit her party and was widely expected to join the LKP, but formed a new party named Onward for Future 4.0. With the exit of the Bareunmirae Party's President Sohn, other former Bareunmirae MPs faced conflicts and founded the New Conservative Party. As a "conservative union", the Liberty Korea Party, Onward for Future 4.0, and the New Conservative Party agreed to merge and establish a new party.

The new party's name was initially set as the Grand Unified New Party (대통합신당), but soon changed to United Future Party (미래통합당). Park Heong-joon, who led the merger and re-foundation, explained that the name shows support for youths and political solidarity.

=== Founding congress ===
Following the merger and re-foundation of the three conservative parties into the United Future Party (UFP) on 17 February 2020, it elected the Liberty Korea Party's President Hwang Kyo-ahn as the president. Though much of the UFP's leadership resembles that of the LKP, Vice Presidents Won Hee-ryong and Kim Young-hwan are not from the LKP.

Logo of the United Future Party (February 2020 – September 2020)

South Korean President Moon Jae-in and the Democratic Party Leader Lee Hae-chan congratulated the new party's founding, but the move was not welcomed by other members. Some sources reported that the party was planning to file a lawsuit against Moon. Yoo Seong-min, the former Bareunmirae president, did not attend the founding congress. Yoo Young-ha, who is in support of Park Geun-hye, exited the LKP before the formation of the new party.

=== 2020–2021 ===
The party contested the 2020 elections with its sister satellite party, the Future Korea Party (FKP). However, some UFP candidates, such as Cha Myong-jin and Kim Dae-ho, provoked controversies for defamatory remarks. The party was defeated in the election with some of the worst results historically for a conservative party in South Korea. The UFP won 103 out of 300 seats in the National Assembly, slightly over one-third of the seats. The party lost several key figures, including Oh Se-hoon, Na Kyung-won, Shim Jae-chul, and Kim Jin-tae. Party Leader Hwang Kyo-ahn, who contested for Jongno, was defeated by former Prime Minister Lee Nak-yeon.

After the election, Hwang announced that he would stand down as the party president. Following Hwang's resignation, it was reported that the party would temporarily establish the Emergency Planning Committee, led by Kim Chong-in. Several members, such as Kim Young-woo, disagreed with the establishment of the committee. Hong Jun-pyo, who showed an intention to return to the UFP, also opposed the proposal and revealed Kim's past corruption allegations.

On 8 May, Joo Ho-young was elected the UFP's Floor Leader, automatically becoming the party's interim Leader. On 22 May, the party held an election to nominate Kim Chong-in as the interim President until the next by-elections on 7 April 2021, which he accepted. The same day, the FKP announced its merger by 29 May. On 28 May, both the UFP and FKP officially declared their merger as the unified UFP.

On 13 August, Realmeter had revealed an opinion poll showing that the party has gained more supporters than the ruling Democratic Party (UFP: 36.5%–DP: 33.4%). This was the first time that a conservative party gained more support than a liberal party since the political scandal of regarding President Park Geun-hye in October 2016.

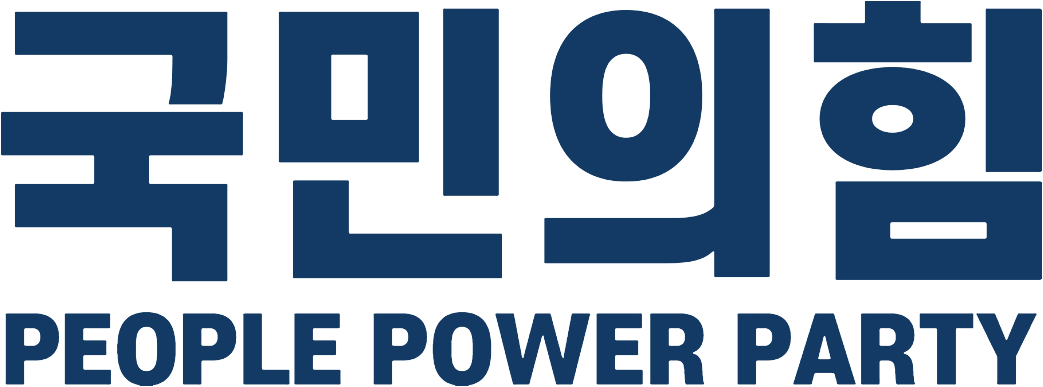
Alternate logo of the People Power Party

On 31 August, the party decided to change its name to the People Power (국민의힘; the "Party" was added later). The party requested that the name be changed to the National Election Commission. It has been argued that the new proposed name was similar to the minor centrist People Party of Ahn Cheol-soo. There were speculations that the party was willing to form an electoral alliance with the People Party in the 2021 by-elections. Jung Chung-rae, an MP of the Democratic Party, criticised the name for being too similar to a civic organisation established in 2003, where he used to serve as the first co-president.

On 2 September, the party officially changed its name to the People Power Party, its current name. The PPP declared that it would be a centrist and pragmatic party. On 14 September, the party revealed its logo and its 3 colors—red, yellow, and blue, based on temporary decisions. These colors were officially confirmed on 23 September, although yellow was replaced with white.

On 17 September, Kweon Seong-dong, the MP for Gangneung, officially returned to the PPP, leading the party to have 104 seats. He left the party before the 2020 elections, where he ran as an independent candidate. The PPP's total seats were reverted to 103 after Park Duk-hyum, the MP for Boeun-Okcheon-Yeongdong-Goesan, quit the party on 23 September following corruption allegations. He denied all allegations related to him and his family. On 22 December, Jeon Bong-min, the MP for Suyeong, quit the party following corruption allegations against himself and his father. On 7 January 2021, Kim Byong-wook, the MP for Pohang South-Ulleung, withdrew from the PPP due to a controversy related to sexual harassment. The same day, Kim Tae-ho, the former Governor of South Gyeongsang and the incumbent MP for Sancheong-Hamyang-Geochang-Hapcheon, officially rejoined the party.

=== 2021 by-elections ===
Before the 2021 by-elections, the party elected the former Mayor of Seoul Oh Se-hoon as its Seoul mayoral candidate, as well as the former MP for Suyeong, Park Heong-joon as its Busan mayoral candidate on 4 March 2021. In the by-elections on 7 April, the party achieved an outright victory due the Moon government's low popularity, with both Oh and Park being elected by a large margin. Oh Se-hoon, who formerly stepped down as the Mayor of Seoul in 2011, defeated the Democratic candidate Park Young-sun and successfully came back to the position. Park Hyung-joon also defeated the Democratic candidate Kim Young-choon and was elected the Mayor of Busan, despite his several controversies, such as Haeundae LCT The Sharp. The same day, the MP for Gimcheon Song Eon-seok, faced public backlash after it was reported that he was cursing and assaulting office workers. He quit the party on 14 April.

=== Opposition (2021–2022) ===
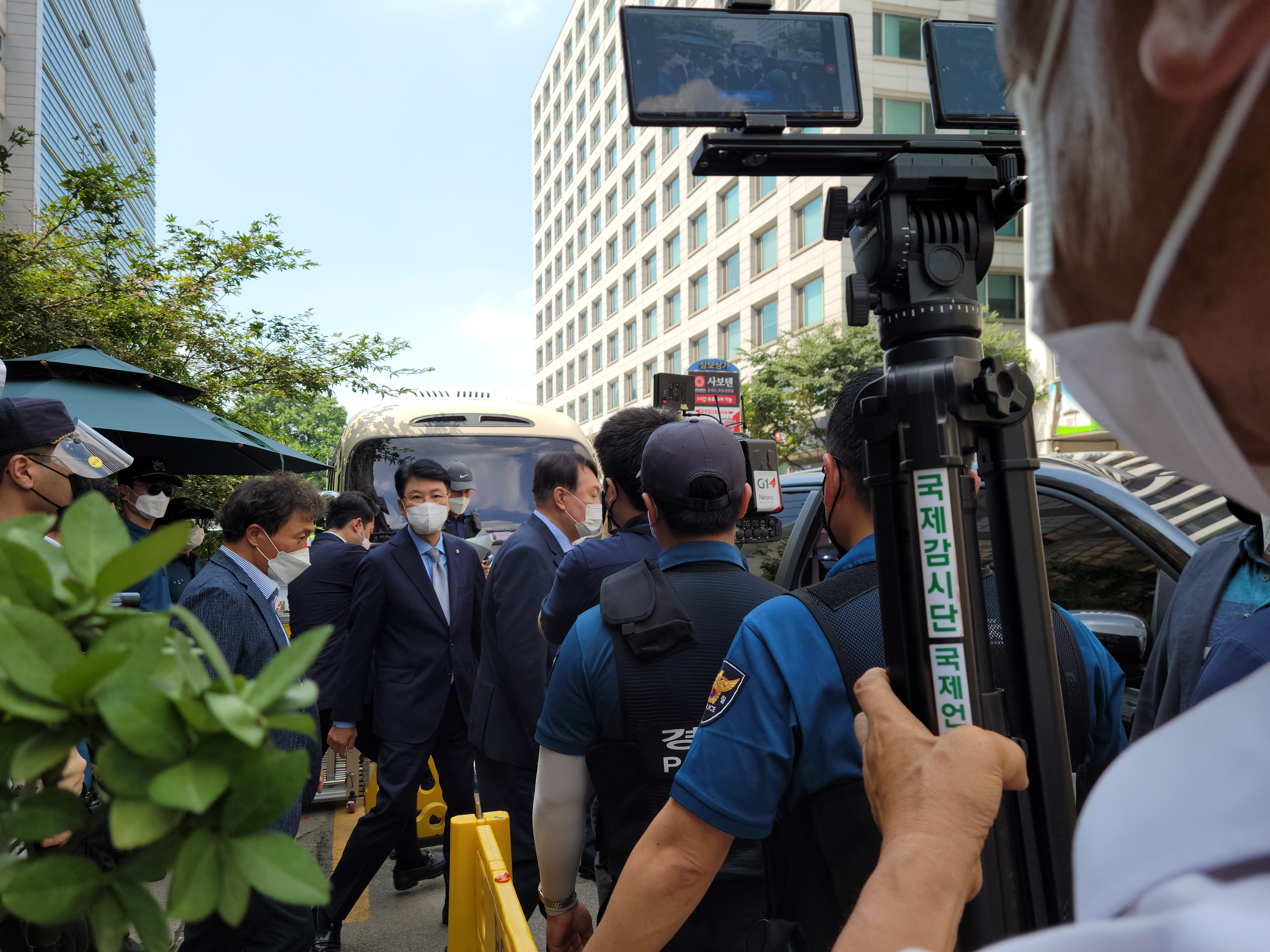
Yoon Seok-yeol leaving the PPP headquarters shortly after he joined the party on 30 July 2021

On 8 April 2021, Joo Ho-young returned as the interim President of the party. He announced his intention to resign as the parliamentary leader on 16 April, adding that he would not serve until his term finishes on 29 May, but instead, until a new person is elected. The same day, the party declared that they will continue the processes to merge the minor People Party. On 30 April, the former Mayor of Ulsan Kim Gi-hyeon was elected the new parliamentary leader of the party, defeating Kim Tae-heum, Kweon Seong-dong, and Yu Eui-dong. He served as the acting party President until the leadership election that was held on 11 June.

On 21 May, Kim Byong-wook, who quit the party in January following a sexual harassment controversy, officially returned to the PPP. On 11 June, Lee Jun-seok was elected the new President of the party, defeating Na Kyung-won and others. On 24 June, the party approved an independent MP Hong Joon-pyo's bid to rejoin. On 15 July, Choi Jae-hyung, one of the potential candidate for the 2022 presidential election, officially joined the party. On 30 July, the former Prosecutor General Yoon Suk Yeol, who was also the most favourable candidate for the 2020 presidential election, officially joined the party. On 5 August, Yoon Sang-hyun, the MP for Incheon East-Michuhol 2nd, rejoined the party, and therefore all 4 PPP-friendly independent MPs successfully returned.

=== 2022 presidential election and by-elections ===
On 5 November 2021, Yoon Suk Yeol won the PPP presidential primary, defeating Hong Joon-pyo. In the presidential election on 9 March 2022, Yoon was elected President of South Korea, defeating Lee Jae Myung by a margin of 0.73%. The party also had significant wins at the March 2022 by-elections that was held along with the presidential election; the party regained 4 out of 5 National Assembly constituencies. Although the party did not contest for Daegu Central-South, Lim Byung-hun, a pro-PPP independent candidate, was elected. This increased the total number of the PPP MPs, from 106 to 110.

On 8 April, Kweon Seong-dong was elected parliamentary leader of the People Power Party, defeating Cho Hae-jin. On 18 April 2022, the minor People Party led by Ahn Cheol-soo merged into the PPP.

=== In government (2022–2025) ===
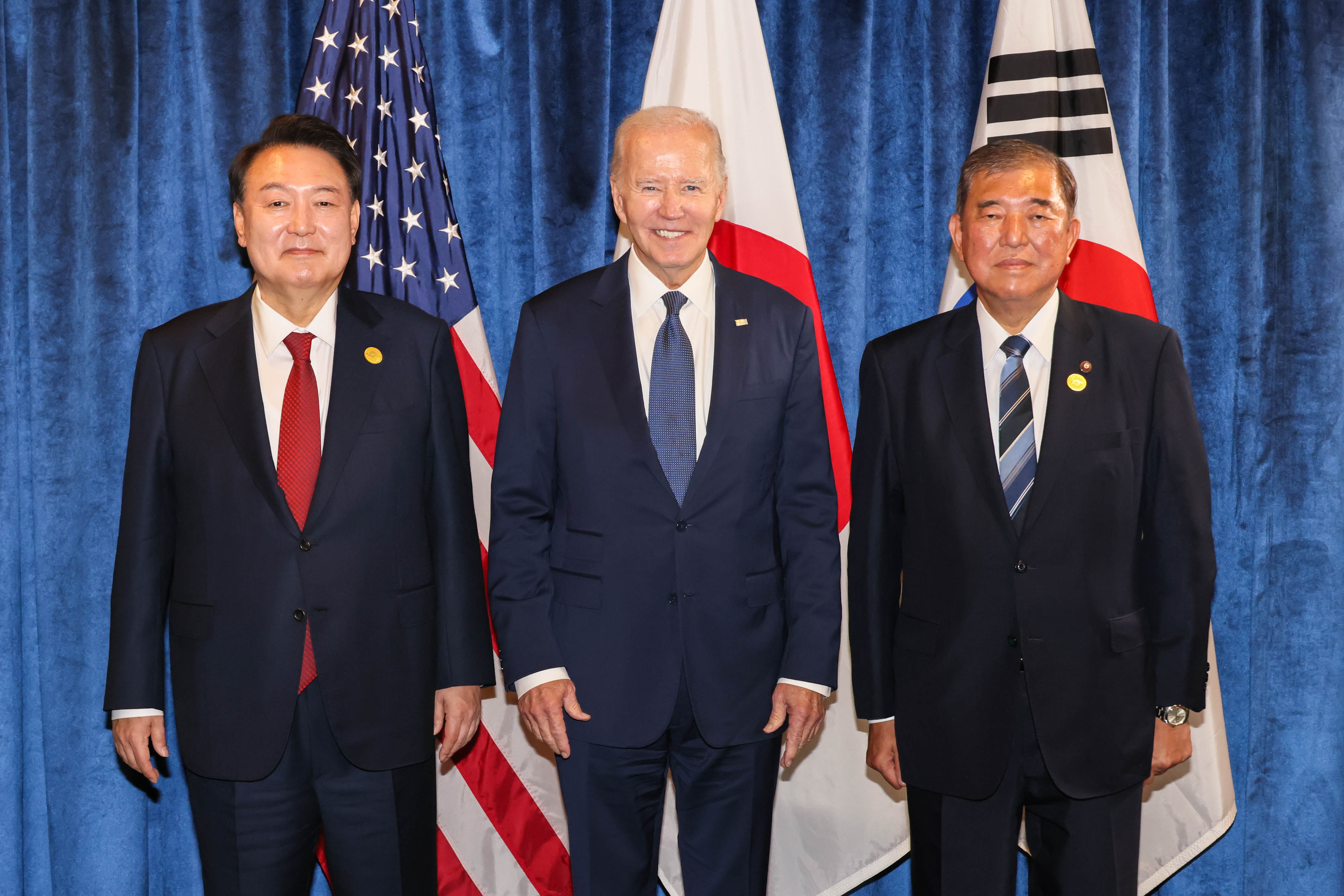
South Korean President Yoon Suk Yeol with U.S. President Joe Biden and Japanese Prime Minister Shigeru Ishiba in November 2024

Following Yoon's inauguration as the President on 9 May, the PPP achieved an outright victory in the local elections on 1 June.

In August 2022, the party leader Lee Jun-seok, who took a critical stance towards Yoon, was removed from his position. The rules of the party convention were limited to 100% of the party member vote, excluding public opinion polls. Yoo Seong-min, a moderate candidate who ranked first in public opinion polls, criticised the change as a way to discredit him. After the Hanbyeon rule change, a number of far-right politicians who insisted on conspiracy theories about fraudulent elections ran for the PPP primary.

Yoon was criticised for attempting to influence the primary in the party leadership race. The rule account for 100% party vote to prevent the election of a candidate critical of the president was also made after the president addressed party lawmakers. Na Kyung-won, who wanted to run for the primary, declared that she would not run. Yoo Seong-min, who was judged to have no chance of winning due to the rule change, also gave up running for the primary. Criticisms were raised in various media outlets that the president intervened excessively in the primary by not maintaining neutrality and excessively pushing certain candidates.

After Na Kyung-won resigned from her candidacy in favour of Kim Gi-hyeon, the election turned into a two-way race between Ahn Cheol-soo and Kim. In this situation, the presidential office sent a friendly message to Kim and called Ahn an "enemy". In addition, members of the "pro-Yoon" faction who supported Kim argued that Ahn took a friendly stance toward progressive intellectuals in the past, saying that he was "a person who respects communists" and "pro-North Korea leftists". The final four candidates for the primary party presidency elections were Cheon Ah-ram, Hwang Kyo-ahn, Kim Gi-hyeon, and Ahn Cheol-soo. On 8 March 2023, Kim Gi-hyeon was elected President of the party. In the primary for the supreme council, all five out of five pro-Yoon candidates were elected. Non-Yoon candidates inside the party criticised that the primary was conducted very unfairly.

On 7 April, Yoon Jae-ok, the MP for Dalseo B, was elected parliamentary leader of the party, defeating Kim Hack-yong. The party brought in the Ihn Yo-han Innovation Committee after losing in the by-election for Gangseo-gu mayor. Party leader Kim Gi-hyeon said he would hand over full authority to the innovation committee chairman. Due to the unpopularity of the Yoon administration, the party lost the 2024 legislative election, with prime minister Han Duck-soo heading a minority government.

==== Martial law crisis ====
After President Yoon declared martial law on 4 December 2024, six opposition parties proposed an impeachment bill against President Yoon. However, the PPP opposed the impeachment of President Yoon and adopted this as its party line. The impeachment bill was submitted to a vote in the National Assembly on 7 December 2024. Due to the PPP boycotting the vote, the impeachment motion failed as it could not be voted on due to a failed quorum of 200 members. Amid public anger over the motion's failure, several PPP lawmakers' offices were vandalized, while others received funeral wreaths with messages such as "insurrection accomplices" written. A box cutter was also found at the residence of MP Kim Jae-sub. A petition filed at the National Assembly website calling for the PPP's dissolution garnered more than 171,000 signatures, exceeding the 50,000 needed to have the proposal submitted to the relevant standing committee.

On 14 December 2024, a second impeachment motion against Yoon passed in the National Assembly with 204 out of 300 lawmakers in favour. This time, 12 of its members supported the measure. As a result, all five members of the PPP's Supreme Council resigned, prompting the formation of an emergency response committee system to lead the party in accordance with its regulations. This was followed by the resignation of PPP leader Han Dong-hoon on 16 December. Kweon Seong-dong became acting party leader. On 24 December, the party nominated Kwon Young-se to head its emergency committee.

Following the termination of Yoon's presidency by the Constitutional Court of Korea, Kim Moon-soo was nominated as the party's candidate in the general election in 2025. On 10 May, Kim's nomination was cancelled and he was replaced by former acting president and prime minister Han Duck-soo, but was later reinstated as the party's nominee. Former PPP leader Hwang Kyo-ahn initially ran as an Independent, but withdrew shortly before election day, endorsing Kim. Ahead of South Korea's 2025 presidential election, Yoon Suk Yeol called for unity among conservatives. However, his appeal drew criticism from reformist members, including Han Dong-hoon and Cho Kyoung-tae, who argue that his past actions have deepened internal divisions and hindered the party's electoral prospects. Kim lost the election to former DPK leader Lee Jae Myung, with former PPP leader and Reform Party candidate Lee Jun-seok splitting many conservative-leaning votes.

=== Opposition (2025–present) ===
The PPP did not fully reject Yoon in the aftermath of the martial law crisis, and its popularity has declined among the public due to its association with the martial law. In August 2025, the PPP elected Jang Dong-hyeok, who had previously opposed the impeachment of Yoon Suk Yeol. The PPP Supreme Council also continued to be dominated by pro-Yoon politicians.

Both the PPP and the Democratic Party (DPK) are embroiled in a political scandal involving allegations of receiving illegal political funds and donations from the Unification Church (sometimes informally called Moonies). On 11 September 2025, the National Assembly approved a motion to arrest former PPP floor leader Kweon Seong-dong on charges of bribery from the Unification Church.

On 7 January 2026, party leader Jang Dong-hyeok publicly apologized for the martial law crisis for the first time and announced that the party would undergo a name change.

The party suffered major losses in the 2026 local elections, but maintained control of Seoul.

== Factions ==
While the PPP does not officially have any organized factions, there exists loosely organized, informal factions within the party. As of January 2026, the party is mainly divided into big-tent pro-Yoon and anti-Yoon factions, while non-aligned members form a minority.

=== Pro-Yoon ===
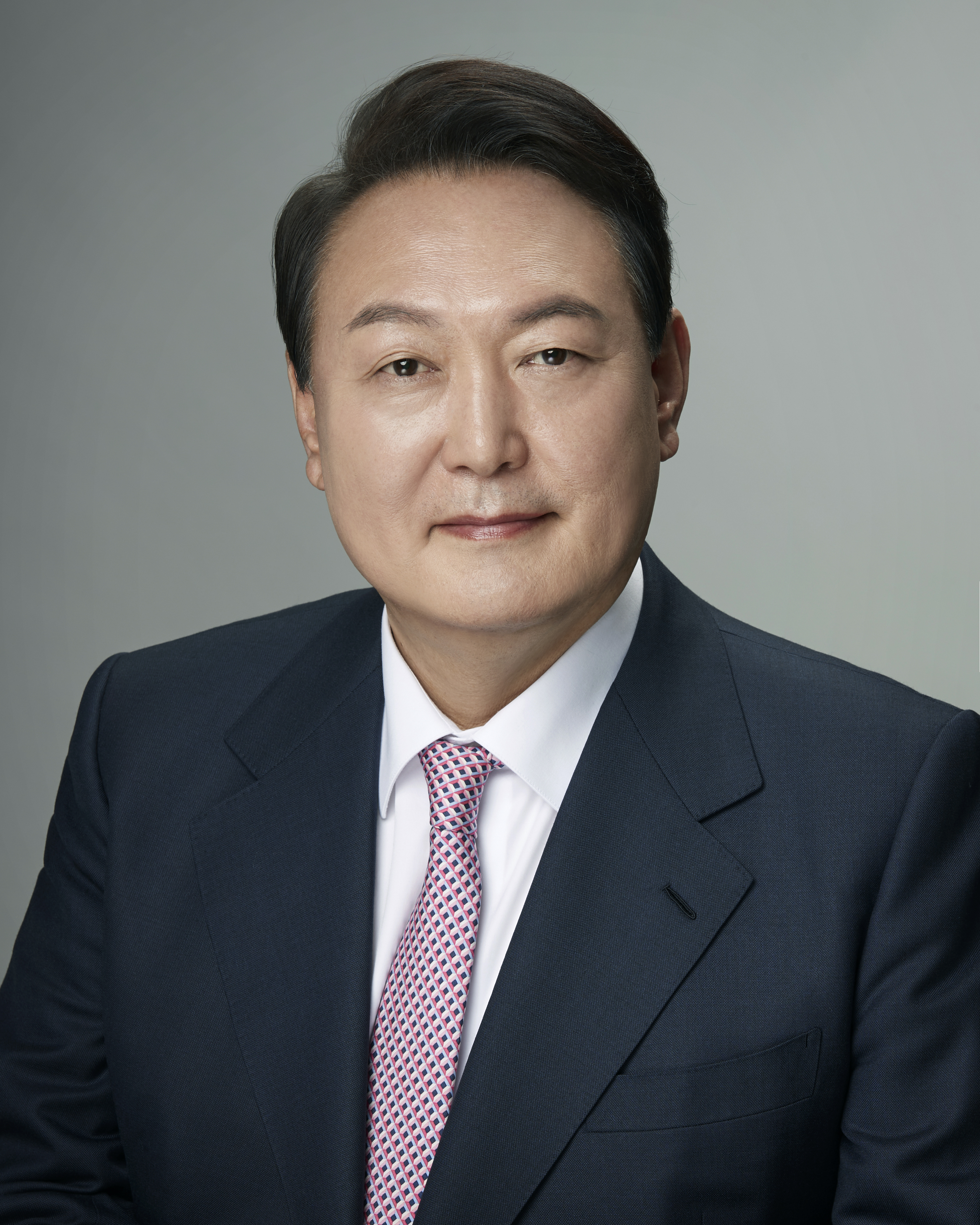
Yoon Suk Yeol, Former President of South Korea

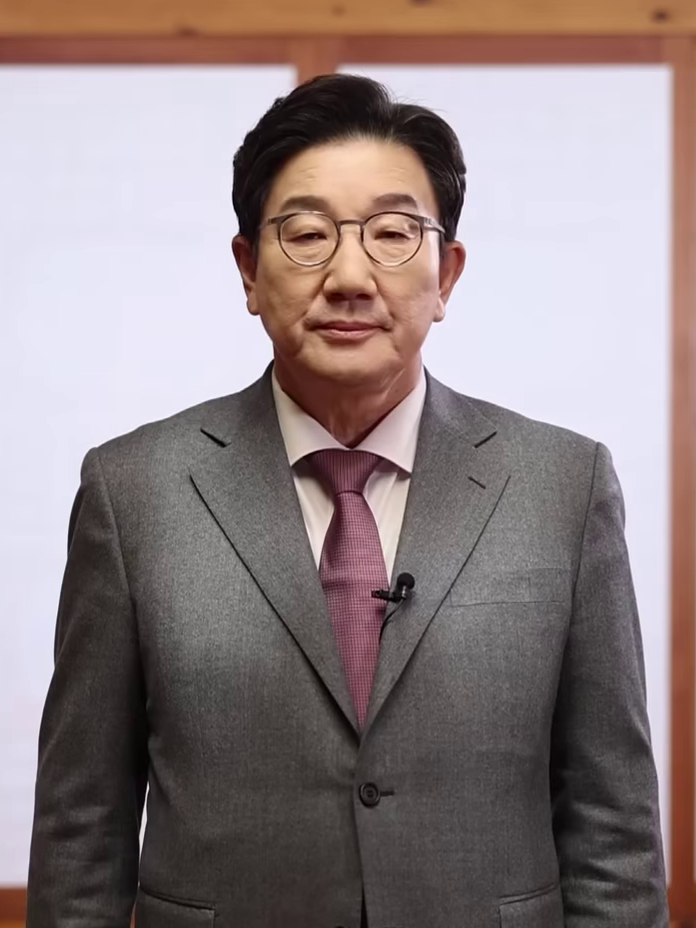
Kweon Seong-dong, Member of Parliament for Gangneung

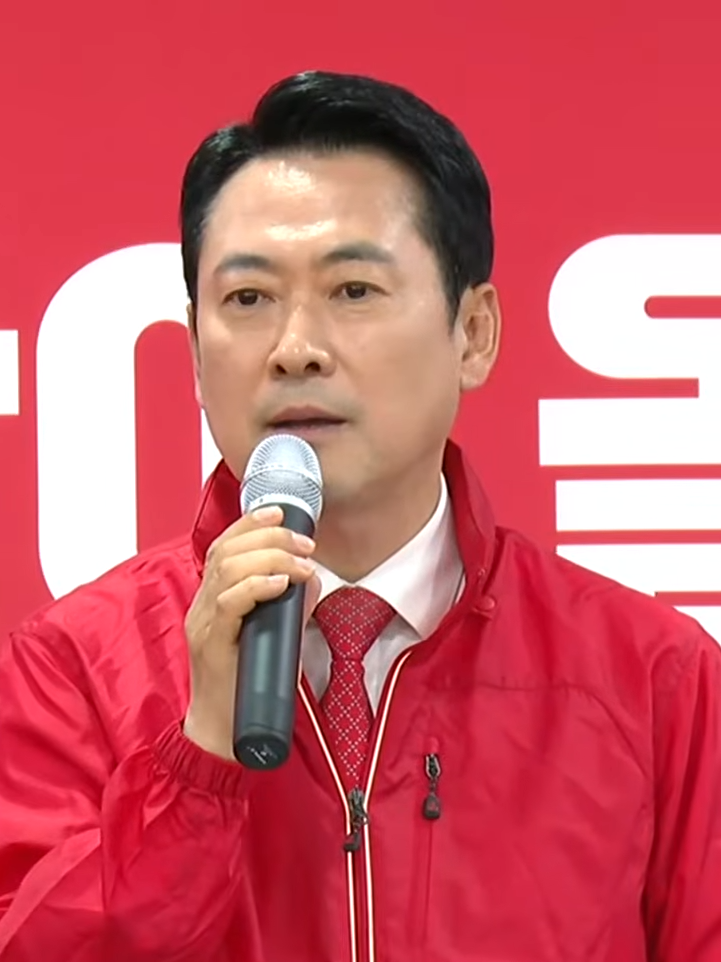
Jang Dong-hyeok, leader of the PPP (2025-present)

"Chin-Yoon" (친윤; lit. ''pro-Yoon'') is the dominant faction of the PPP, often described as being on the party's far-right that supports former President Yoon Suk Yeol. In the aftermath of the South Korean martial law crisis, many members of the pro-Yoon faction refused to condemn Yoon nor his declaration of martial law, instead advocating for his reinstatement prior to and after his impeachment by supporting the "Yoon Again" campaign. Key figures of the Pro-Yoon circle are often referred to as "Yoon haek-gwan" (윤핵관). Supporters of the Pro-Yoon faction generally hold ultraconservative and anti-communist views, with some being especially hostile toward China and North Korea. These views have been accompanied by baseless election fraud claims regarding the 2025 presidential election, with some far-right Pro-Yoon YouTubers such as Jeon Han-gil alleging Chinese involvement.

Top figures within the party such as former presidential candidate Kim Moon-soo and current party leader Jang Dong-hyeok have both been referred to as part of the pro-Yoon faction.

=== Anti-Yoon ===
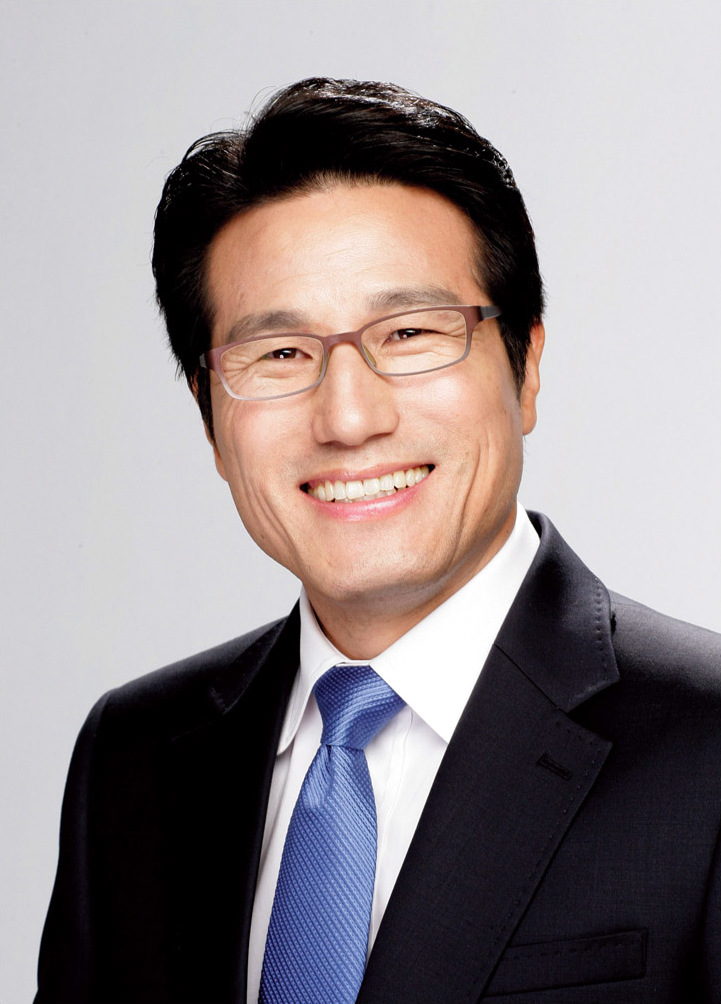
Choung Byoung-gug, former Minister of Culture, Sports and Tourism

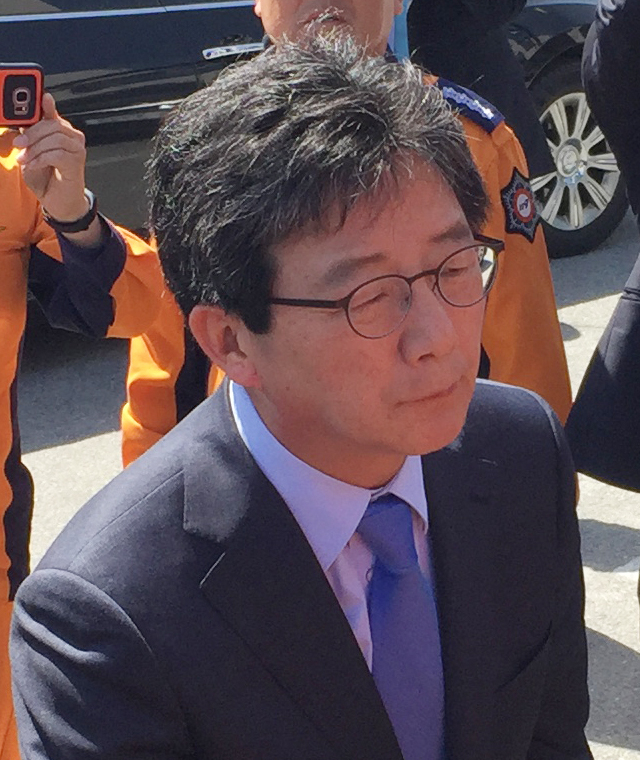
Yoo Seung-min, former member of the National Assembly

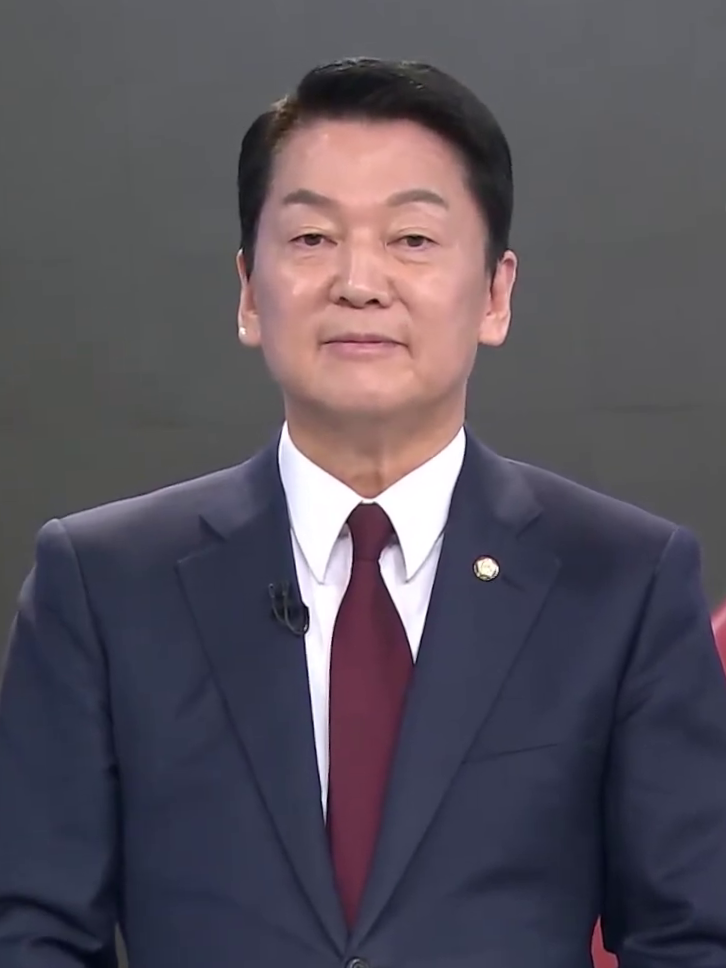
Ahn Cheol-soo, member of the National Assembly

"Ban-Yoon" (반윤; lit. 'anti-Yoon') is a right-wing big-tent faction of the PPP consisting of members who are critical of Yoon Suk Yeol. There exists several sub factions within the anti-Yoon faction, with the most prominent being the pro-Han Dong-hoon faction which voted in favour of lifting Yoon's martial law. Since the martial law crisis, the pro-Han faction has been defined by its opposition to Yoon Suk Yeol and support for moderate conservatism. Other anti-Yoon PPP politicians such as Ahn Cheol-soo and Yoo Seong-min are defined by their economically liberal and paternalistic conservative ideologies.

== Ideology and political positions ==
The People Power Party is a big tent conservative political party. The PPP is broadly considered to be conservative, national-conservative, South Korean nationalist and anti-communist, though political spectrums inside it range from moderate conservative to ultraconservative. The People's Power Party is mainly described as right-wing. The party has also been described as far-right, especially since the 2024 martial law crisis.

=== Economic policies ===
In the past, conservative political parties in South Korea supported economic interventionism due to the historical influence of Park Chung Hee. However, the PPP is now more economically liberal, pro-business, and supportive of fiscal conservatism.

=== Social policies ===
The PPP is socially conservative, advocating traditional family values and national patriotism. PPP and its politicians have taken a hostile stance against feminism. Some young right-wing politicians in the PPP also support Idaenam.

PPP has voiced opposition to the Democratic Party's policy of attempting to regulate dog meat consumption. Yang Joon-woo, a spokesman for PPP, said in 2021 that the "state does not have the right to regulate individual tastes or eating habits". However, in 2023, PPP announced their plans to introduce a bill that would ban dog meat consumption by 2027, with the bill is enacted by the end of 2023. The PPP advocates for the abolishment of the "Korean age" and the standardisation of age counting in South Korea. Lee Yong-ho, the chief of Yoon's transition committee, said the different age counting methods in the country creates "persistent confusion" and "unnecessary social and economic costs".

As South Korea's birthrate continued dropping, key politicians in the PPP have started moving away from the conservative immigration policies of the past and have begun to support a more liberal approach. The Yoon administration supported the creation of "Korea Border and Immigration Agency" (이민청); proposals regarding the agency were discussed and failed during the past liberal Kim Dae-jung government. On the other hand, the party's position on foreign voting rights is more restrictive, arguing that "foreigners from countries that do not grant voting rights to South Koreans living abroad should be deprived of all voting rights."

=== Foreign policy ===
PPP has generally taken a friendly stance towards the United States. PPP's conservative wing is generally more pro-United States. President Yoon has taken an overwhelmingly pro-American policy compared to previous presidents by moving high-tech supply chains and production to the United States, as well as signing military agreements with the US.

PPP's position on China is ambiguous, but sometimes critical. However, conservatives in South Korea place more importance on economic pragmatism than liberals, meaning they try to avoid friction with China. PPP has stated that it views China and North Korea separately; after Yoon wrote an Instagram caption signalling "myeolkong", meaning "destroy communists". However, the PPP has politically exploited anti-Chinese sentiment for political gains, including by spreading conspiracy theories about Chinese nationals, which has led to an increase to hate speech and violence against Chinese people. PPP officials have also supported restrictions on Chinese nationals and opposed an increase in Chinese tourists, as well as opposing measures to give Chinese tourists visa-free access.

In regards to Japan, the PPP has a more conciliatory approach compared to the more hawkish Democratic Party. The PPP does not seek direct compensation or apology from the Japanese government and companies for victims of forced labor, a war crime committed by the Empire of Japan and Japanese companies during World War II, instead supporting receiving voluntary donations from South Korean companies through a foundation. The PPP is fiercely anti-communist and advocates a hawkish policy against North Korea. This has led them to usually perform well electorally in constituencies that border the Korean Demilitarized Zone. Many PPP politicians support South Korea having nuclear weapons on its own in order to counter North Korea's nuclear weapons.

== Leadership ==
=== Leaders ===
- Note: ^{ERC} – as head of Emergency Response Committee

| No. | Name | Photo | Term of office | | ᅠElection resultsᅠ |
| No. | Name | Photo | Took office | Left office | ᅠElection resultsᅠ |
|---|---|---|---|---|---|
| 1 | Hwang Kyo-ahn (resigned) | | 17 February 2020 | 15 April 2020 | No election |
| — | Shim Jae-chul (acting) | | 16 April 2020 | 8 May 2020 | Succeeded |
| — | Joo Ho-young (acting) | | 8 May 2020 | 27 May 2020 | Succeeded |
| — | Kim Chong-in (ERC) | | 27 May 2020 | 8 April 2021 | Appointed |
| — | Joo Ho-young (acting) | | 8 April 2021 | 30 April 2021 | Succeeded |
| — | Kim Gi-hyeon (acting) | | 30 April 2021 | 11 June 2021 | Succeeded |
| 2 | Lee Jun-seok | | 11 June 2021 | 9 August 2022 | 2021 Lee Jun-seok – 43.81% Na Kyung-won – 37.13% Joo Ho-young – 14.02% Cho Kyoung-tae – 2.80% Hong Moon-pyo – 2.21% |
| — | Kweon Seong-dong (acting) | | 8 July 2022 | 9 August 2022 | Succeeded |
| — | Joo Ho-young (ERC) | | 9 August 2022 | 26 August 2022 | Appointed |
| — | Kweon Seong-dong (acting) | | 26 August 2022 | 8 September 2022 | Succeeded |
| — | Chung Jin-suk (ERC) | | 8 September 2022 | 8 March 2023 | Appointed |
| 3 | Kim Gi-hyeon | | 8 March 2023 | 13 December 2023 | 2023 Kim Gi-hyeon – 52.93% Ahn Cheol-soo – 23.37% Chun Ha-ram – 14.98% Hwang Kyo-ahn – 8.72% |
| — | Yoon Jae-ok (acting) | | 13 December 2023 | 26 December 2023 | Succeeded |
| — | Han Dong-hoon (ERC) | | 26 December 2023 | 11 April 2024 | Appointed |
| – | Yoon Jae-ok (acting) | | 11 April 2024 | 2 May 2024 | Succeeded |
| – | Hwang Woo-yea (ERC) | | 2 May 2024 | 23 July 2024 | Appointed |
| 4 | Han Dong-hoon | | 23 July 2024 | 16 December 2024 | 2024 Han Dong-hoon – 62.84% Won Hee-ryong – 18.85% Na Kyung-won – 14.58% Yoon Sang-hyun – 3.73% |
| — | Kweon Seong-dong (acting) | | 16 December 2024 | 30 December 2024 | Succeeded |
| — | Kwon Young-se (ERC) | | 30 December 2024 | 10 May 2025 | Appointed |
| — | Kweon Seong-dong (acting) | | 11 May 2025 | 15 May 2025 | Succeeded |
| — | Kim Yong-tae (ERC) | | 15 May 2025 | 30 June 2025 | Appointed |
| — | Song Eon-seok (ERC) | | 30 June 2025 | 26 August 2025 | Appointed |
| 5 | Jang Dong-hyeok | | 26 August 2025 | Incumbent | 2025 Jang Dong-hyeok – 50.27% Kim Moon-soo – 49.73% |

=== Floor Leaders ===
| No. | Name | Photo | Term of office | |
| No. | Name | Photo | Took office | Left office |
|---|---|---|---|---|
| 1 | Shim Jae-chul (resigned) | | 17 February 2020 | 8 May 2020 |
| 2 | Joo Ho-young | | 8 May 2020 | 30 April 2021 |
| 3 | Kim Gi-hyeon | | 30 April 2021 | 8 April 2022 |
| 4 | Kweon Seong-dong | | 8 April 2022 | 19 September 2022 |
| 5 | Joo Ho-young | | 19 September 2022 | 7 April 2023 |
| 6 | Yoon Jae-ok | | 7 April 2023 | 9 May 2024 |
| 7 | Choo Kyung-ho | | 9 May 2024 | 24 June 2024 |
| - | Bae Joon-young (acting) | | 24 June 2024 | 29 June 2024 |
| 7 | Choo Kyung-ho | | 29 June 2024 | 7 December 2024 |
| - | Bae Joon-young (acting) | | 7 December 2024 | 12 December 2024 |
| 8 | Kweon Seong-dong | | 12 December 2024 | 5 June 2025 |
| — | Park Hyeong-su (acting) | | 5 June 2025 | 16 June 2025 |
| 9 | Song Eon-seok | | 16 June 2025 | 10 June 2026 |
| 10 | Jeong Jeom-sig | | 10 June 2025 | Incumbent |

=== Secretary-General ===
| No. | Name | Photo | Term of office | |
| No. | Name | Photo | Took office | Left office |
|---|---|---|---|---|
| 1 | Park Wan-su | | 17 February 2020 | 28 May 2020 |
| 2 | Kim Seon-dong | | 28 May 2020 | 14 October 2020 |
| 3 | Cheong Yang-seog | | 19 October 2020 | 11 June 2021 |
| 4 | Han Ki-ho | | 17 June 2021 | 17 November 2021 |
| 5 | Kweon Seong-dong | | 18 November 2021 | 5 January 2022 |
| 6 | Kwon Young-se | | 6 January 2022 | 10 March 2022 |
| 7 | Han Ki-ho | | 10 March 2022 | 8 August 2022 |
| 8 | Kim Seok-ki | | 18 August 2022 | 10 March 2023 |
| 9 | Lee Chul-gyu | | 13 March 2023 | 16 October 2023 |
| 10 | Lee Man-hee | | 16 October 2023 | 29 December 2023 |
| 11 | Jang Dong-hyeok | | 29 December 2023 | 15 April 2024 |
| — | Bae Joon-young (acting) | | 15 April 2024 | 2 May 2024 |
| 12 | Bae Joon-young | | 2 May 2024 | 13 May 2024 |
| 13 | Sung Il-jong | | 13 May 2024 | 29 July 2024 |
| 14 | Seo Beom-soo | | 29 July 2024 | 16 December 2024 |
| 15 | Lee Yang-soo | | 30 December 2024 | 15 May 2025 |
| 16 | Park Dae-chul | | 15 May 2025 | 3 July 2025 |
| 17 | Jeong Jeom-sig | | 3 July 2025 | 1 September 2025 |
| 18 | Jeong Hui-yong | | 1 September 2025 | Incumbent |

== Election results ==
=== President ===
| Election | Candidate | Votes | % | Result |
|---|---|---|---|---|
| 2022 | Yoon Suk Yeol | 16,394,815 | 48.56 | Elected |
| 2025 | Kim Moon-soo | 14,395,639 | 41.15 | Lost |

=== Legislature ===
| Election | Leader | Constituency | | | | Party list | | | | Seats | | Position | Status |
| Election | Leader | Votes | % | Seats | ± | Votes | % | Seats | ± | No. | +/– | Position | Status |
|---|---|---|---|---|---|---|---|---|---|---|---|---|---|
| 2020 | Hwang Kyo-ahn | 11,915,277 | 41.46 | 84 / 253 | new | | | | | 103 / 300 (Note: Including 19 seats from Future Korea Party) | new | 2nd | Opposition (2020) |
| 2024 | Han Dong-hoon (Interim) | 13,179,769 | 45.73 | 90 / 254 | ▲6 | | | | | 108 / 300 (Note: Including 18 seats from People Future Party) | ▲5 | 2nd | Government (2022–2025) |
| 2024 | Han Dong-hoon (Interim) | 13,179,769 | 45.73 | 90 / 254 | ▲6 | | | | | 108 / 300 | ▲5 | 2nd | Opposition (2025–present) |

=== Local ===
| Election | Leader | Metropolitan Mayors and Governors | Provincial and Metropolitan Councillors | Municipal mayors | Municipal councillors |
|---|---|---|---|---|---|
| 2022 | Lee Jun-seok | 12 / 17 | 540 / 872 | 145 / 226 | 1,435 / 2,987 |
| 2026 | Jang Dong-hyeok | 4 / 16 | 327 / 933 | 95 / 227 | 1,277 / 3,035 |
