= Kim Young-choon =

South Korean politician (born 1962)

The Honourable Kim Young-choon
- 김영춘
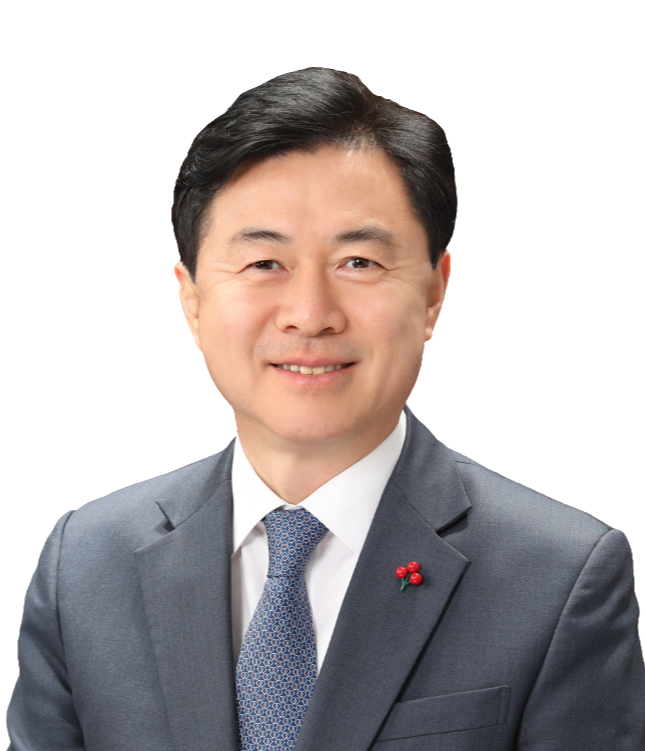
- Kim in 2020

Secretary-General of the National Assembly
- In office 29 June 2020 – 28 December 2020
- Preceded by: Yoo In-tae
- Succeeded by: Chun Sang-soo (acting); Lee Choon-suak

Minister of Oceans and Fisheries
- In office 16 June 2017 – 2 April 2019
- President: Moon Jae-in
- Prime Minister: Lee Nak-yon
- Preceded by: Kim Young-suk
- Succeeded by: Moon Seong-hyeok

Member of the National Assembly
- In office 30 May 2016 – 29 May 2020
- Preceded by: Na Sung-lin
- Succeeded by: Suh Byung-soo
- Constituency: Busanjin A (Busan)
- In office 30 May 2000 – 29 May 2008
- Preceded by: Kim Sang-woo
- Succeeded by: Kwon Taek-ki
- Constituency: Gwangjin A (Seoul)

Personal details
- Born: 5 February 1962 (age 64) Busanjin, Busan, South Korea
- Party: Democratic
- Other political affiliations: UDP (1987–1990); DLP (1992–1995); NKP (1995–1997); GNP (1997–2003); Uri (2003–2007); Democratic (2010–2011); DUP (2011–2013); Democratic (2013–2014); NPAD (2014–2015)
- Spouse: Shim Yeon-ok
- Children: Kim Joon-hyun
- Education: Korea University
- Occupation: Activist, politician

Kim Young-choon (Korean: 김영춘, born 5 February 1962) is a South Korean former politician serving as the Secretary-General of the National Assembly from June 2020. He was previously President Moon Jae-in's first Minister of Oceans and Fisheries and a three-term parliamentarian. Prior to entering politics, he was an activist at Korea University, where he served as the president of its student union.

== Education ==
Kim Young-choon was educated at Sungji Primary School (1969–74), Busan Kaesong Secondary School (1975–77) and Busan East High School (1978–80). He enrolled for undergraduate studies in English language at Korea University as a top student in 1981. Following his graduation in 1988, he continued to postgraduate studies in diplomacy and completed in 1990.

== Career ==
=== Activist career ===
In 1984, while attending at Korea University, Kim was elected the President of the Student Council. He was briefly detained for occupying the-then ruling Democratic Justice Party (DJP) headquarter. Following the 1985 election, he was released and joined labour movements.

=== Early political career ===
Kim joined the Council for the Promotion of Democracy in the late 1980s, where he met the-then Chairman of the United Democratic Party (UDP) Kim Young-sam. In 1987, he became the secretary to the party chairman. He was appointed the Secretary to the President for Political Affairs of the Blue House following the victory of the ex-UDP Chairman in 1992 presidential election.

Prior to the 1996 election, Kim contested NKP preselection for Gwangjin 1st constituency. He defeated the former Deputy Minister of Culture and Sports Kim Do-hyun, but lost to the NCNP candidate Kim Sang-woo. He was elected to the National Assembly under the Grand National Party (GNP) banner at the 2000 election.

In July 2003, following the election of Roh Moo-hyun Kim withdrew from the GNP, criticising the GNP for "returning back to the DJP". He then joined the newly formed ruling Uri Party and was re-elected in 2004 election. On the other hand, he subsequently became critical to the Roh's government. In 2007, he declared to not seek for re-election in the upcoming general election. For the presidential election in December he endorsed Moon Kook-hyun.

Following the general election, Kim briefly took a rest and did not hold any party memberships. He returned to politics by joining the Democratic Party after being nominated Vice President by the party president Sohn Hak-kyu. In 2012 election, he unsuccessfully ran for Busanjin 1st constituency.

On 26 February 2014, Kim launched his bid for Busan mayorship prior to the 2014 local elections. He was confirmed as the NPAD candidate but abandoned his candidacy and endorsed the independent candidate Oh Keo-don in order to beat the ruling Saenuri's Suh Byung-soo. Oh, however, narrowly lost to the Saenuri candidate.

In the 2016 election, Kim was again selected as the MP candidate for Busanjin 1st constituency. At the beginning, he was not expected to win as he came behind to the Saenuri candidate Na Sung-lin. However, on the election day, he received approximately 49.6% and defeated Na with a majority of 2,853 votes.

=== Minister of Oceans and Fisheries ===
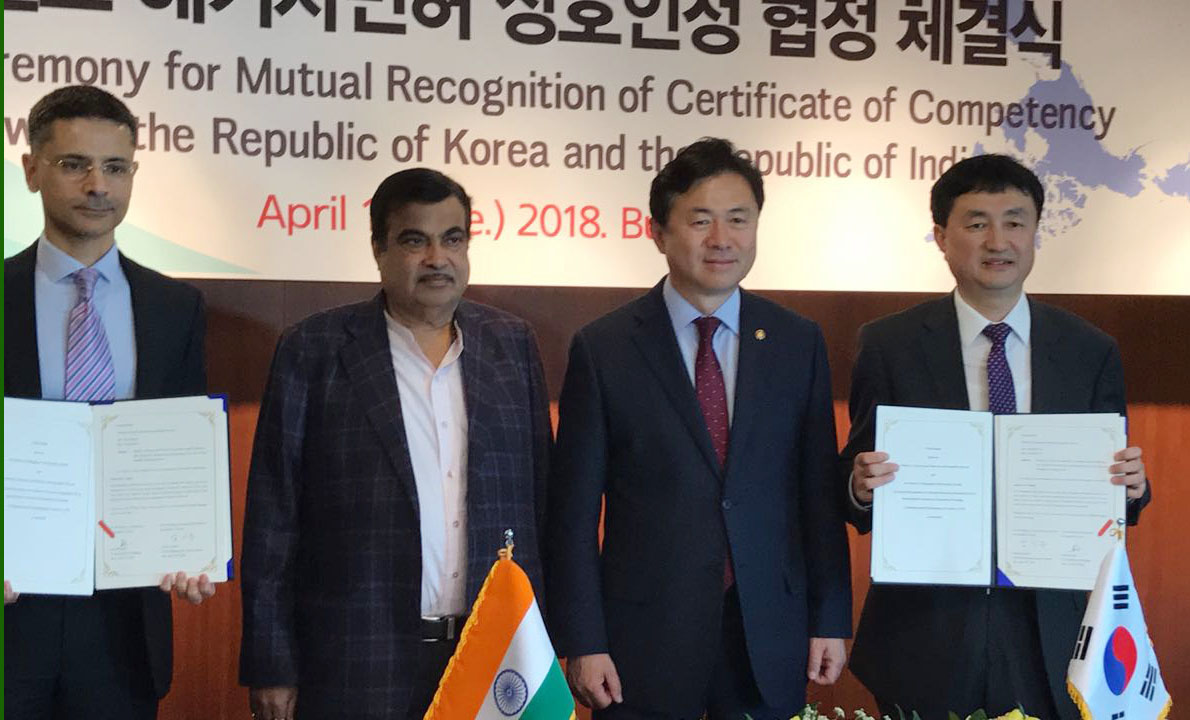
Kim Young-choon with Nitin Gadkari, the Minister of Micro, Small and Medium Enterprises and the Minister of Road Transport and Highways of India.

On 30 May 2017, Kim was nominated the Minister of Oceans and Fisheries by the newly elected President Moon Jae-in. He was officially appointed to the position on 16 June.

On 17 June, the next day of his appointment, Kim visited Mokpo New Port for inspect the MV Sewol in order to recover uncollected bodies and settle unsolved issues. He met some bereaved families and promised to solve the problem as soon as possible.

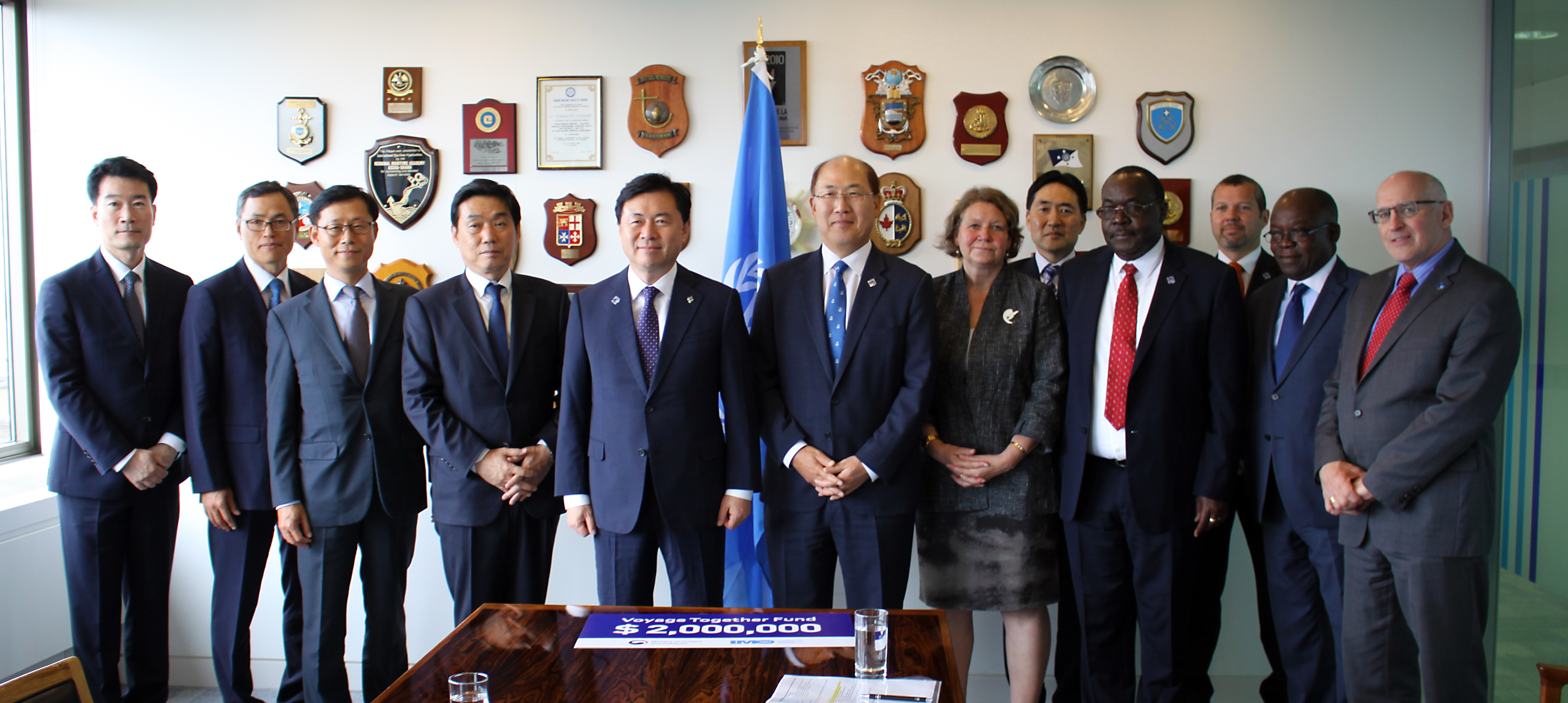
Kim Young-choon with Kitack Lim, the Secretary-General of the International Maritime Organization (IMO) at the IMO headquarter in London.

The Coast Guard, abolished following the MV Sewol tragedy, was re-established under the new government. Kim praised the Government's decision and urged the cooperation between the Ministry and the Coast Guard.

Prior to the 2018 local elections, Kim was a potential candidate for Busan mayorship. However, he confirmed he would not run, letting Oh Keo-don to be the governmental candidate.

On 8 May 2018, approximately a year later the inauguration of the President Moon, Kim was chosen as the best minister of the Government. A week later, the Ministry announced they would bring a plan to build marine solar plants.

Kim was replaced by Moon Seong-hyeok on 3 April 2019. Serving for a year and 9 months, he was the longest-serving Minister of Oceans and Fisheries.

=== Post-ministership ===
On 26 November 2019, Kim showed his intention to run for the 2022 presidential election, citing an example of the former Oceans and Fisheries Minister Roh Moo-hyun who later became the President.

Prior to the 2020 election, Kim was again nominated as the Democratic candidate for Busanjin A constituency. Though he was neck-to-neck with the UFP candidate Suh Byung-soo, he led at early polls. He, however, lost to the former Busan Mayor.

In June 2020, he was appointed as the 33rd Secretary-General of the National Assembly responsible for its administration by the newly elected Speaker Park Byeong-seug.

=== 2021 Busan mayoral election ===
The resignation of the Mayor of Busan Oh Keo-don on 23 April 2020 following the allegations of sexual harassment has provoked the by-election in 2021. Since then, Kim has been considered again as the potential candidate of the Democratic Party.

On 17 December, Kim mentioned that he will definitely run for the election if the ruling Democratic Party is willing to build the new airport (replacing the incumbent Gimhae International Airport) in Gadeokdo. On 28 December, he officially resigned from the Secretary-General of the National Assembly; this was described by several media as "de facto confirmation to contest in the election."

On 12 January 2021, Kim officially launched his bid for Busan mayorship at Nameless Diary, a complex cultural space in Yeongdo. Firstly, he apologised for Oh's sexual harassment controversy as he came from the same party with the ex-Mayor. Then, he suggested "3 Dreams", they are:

- Dream for Global Economic City: Making Busan as "Singapore of Northeast Asia" through inviting 20 of medium and large businesses, as well as creating 250,000 new jobs
- Dream for Green City: Developing eco-friendly renewable energy through hydrogen or electric vehicles, providing green spaces and establishing the local police force to protect citizens
- Dream for International Cultural City: Inviting Art Basel, as well as establishing the Female Parliament

Following are the manifestos he has promised:

- Completing the new airport in Gadeokdo by 2029, in order to host Expo 2030
- In a relation with the new airport:
  - Developing an airport city
  - Build a semi-high speed rail connected to the new airport
  - Inviting international distribution companies i.e. Amazon, Alibaba, DHL and FedEx in West Busan

On 6 March 2021, Kim won Democratic preselection by obtaining 67.74%, defeating the former Deputy Mayor Byeon Sung-wan (25.12%) and the former Speaker of the Busan Metropolitan Council Park In-young (7.14%).

Nevertheless, various polls indicated that Kim came behind of the PPP candidate Park Hyung-joon.

The exit poll released shortly after the election on 7 April showed that Kim could only secure 33.0%, compared to Park who was expected to obtain 64.0%. He subsequently conceded his defeat, although the official result had not been announced yet. At 02:30 KST 8 April, the ballot counting was finished, and Kim received 528,135 votes (34.42%).

=== Retirement ===
On 21 March 2022, Kim made an announcement to retire from politics on his Facebook. He also added that he would not contest for Busan mayorship at the June local elections.

== Personal life ==
Kang married to Shim Yeon-ok whom he met at university. During an interview, he revealed that she was a younger sister of his senior. Being in a relationship with her for 6 years, both finally married in 1988. He has a son named Kim Joon-hyun.

== Electoral history ==
=== General elections ===
Election	Year	Constituency	Political party	Votes (%)	Remarks
15th National Assembly General Election	1996	Seoul Gwangjin A	NKP	22,309 (27.93%)	Lost (2nd)
16th National Assembly General Election	2000	Seoul Gwangjin A	GNP	37,446 (50.79%)	Won
17th National Assembly General Election	2004	Seoul Gwangjin A	Uri	44,519 (50.73%)	Won
19th National Assembly General Election	2012	Busan Busanjin A	DUP	34,238 (35.76%)	Lost (2nd)
20th National Assembly General Election	2016	Busan Busanjin A	Democratic	45,706 (49.58%)	Won
21st National Assembly General Election	2020	Busan Busanjin A	Democratic	48,287 (45.02%)	Lost (2nd)

=== Local elections ===
==== Mayor of Busan ====
Elections	Year	Constituency	Political party	Votes (%)	Remarks
2021 By-election	2021	Busan (Mayoral Elections)	Democratic	528,135 (34.42%)	Lost (2nd)

National Assembly of the Republic of Korea
Preceded by Kim Sang-woo	Member of the National Assembly for Gwangjin A (Seoul); 30 May 2000–29 May 2008	Succeeded by Kwon Tak-ki
Preceded by Na Sung-lin	Member of the National Assembly for Busanjin A (Busan); 30 May 2016–29 May 2020	Succeeded by Suh Byung-soo
Political offices
Preceded by Kim Young-suk	Minister of Oceans and Fisheries; 16 June 2017–2 April 2019	Succeeded by Moon Seong-hyeok
Preceded by Yoo In-tae	Secretary-General of the National Assembly; 29 June 2020–28 December 2020	Succeeded by Lee Choon-suak
