= Lee Un-ju =

South Korean politician

- 이언주
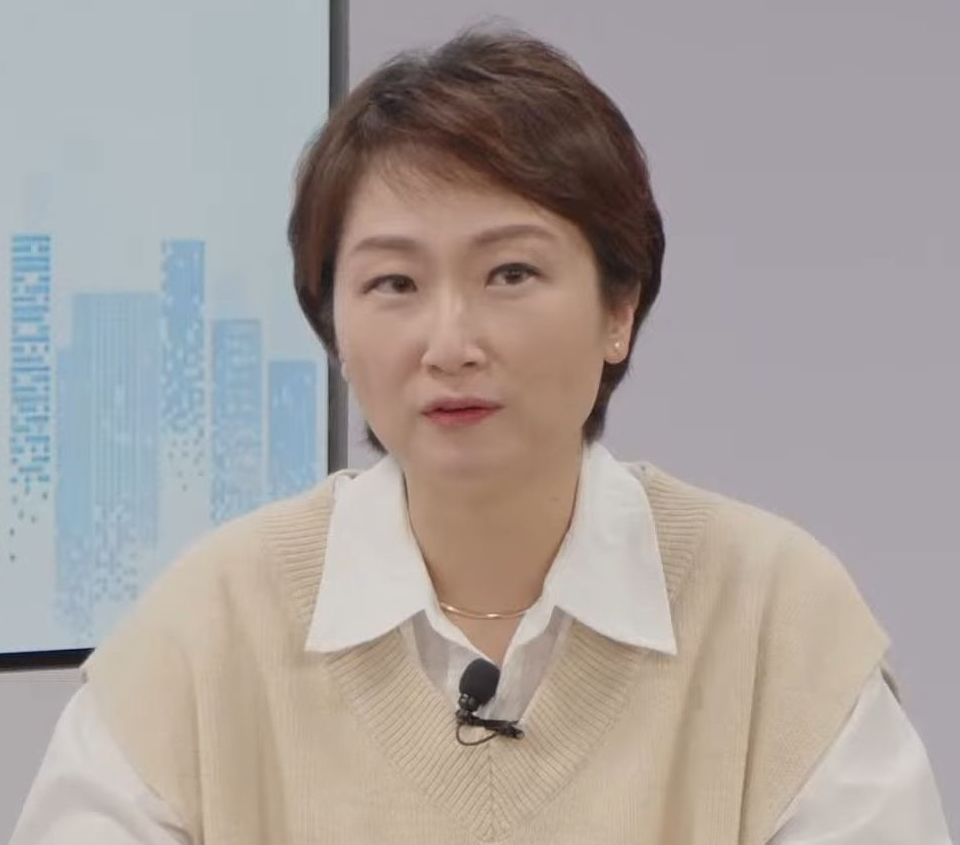

Member of the National Assembly
- In office 30 May 2012 – 29 May 2020
- Preceded by: Chun Jae-hui
- Succeeded by: Yang Ki-dae
- Constituency: Gwangmyeong B (Gyeonggi)

Member of the National Assembly
- Incumbent
- Assumed office 30 May 2024
- Preceded by: Lee Tan-hi
- Constituency: Yongin D (Gyeonggi)

Personal details
- Born: 8 November 1972 (age 54) Yeongdo, Busan, South Korea
- Party: Democratic
- Other political affiliations: Democratic Unionist Party (2012–2013); Democratic Party (2013–2014); New Politics Alliance for Democracy (2014–2015); Democratic Party of Korea (2015–2017, 2024–); Independent (2017, 2019–2020, 2023–2024); People's Party (2017–2018); Bareunmirae (2018–2019); Onward for Future 4.0 (2020); United Future (2020); People Power (2020–2023)
- Spouse: Choi Won-jae
- Children: 1 son
- Education: Seoul National University
- Occupation: Lawyer, politician

Korean name
- Hangul: 이언주
- Hanja: 李彦周
- RR: I Eonju
- MR: I Ŏnju

Lee Un-ju (Korean: 이언주; born 8 November 1972) is a South Korean lawyer and politician who served as the Member of the National Assembly for Gyeonggi Gwangmyeong B constituency from 2012 to 2020, Gyeonggi Yongin D constituency since 2024. She formerly served as the deputy parliamentary leader of the Democratic Unionist Party in 2012 and the People's Party in 2017.

== Biography ==
Born in Yeongdo, Busan, Lee grew up in Singapore. She has a degree in French at Seoul National University, and passed the judicial examination in 1997. She was involved in several part-time jobs after her father's business went bankrupt during the economic crisis in 1997. Her mother died in 2011.

During the 2000s, Lee worked as an entrepreneur at S-Oil and Renault Samsung Motors.

== Political career ==
In early 2012, Lee was brought into the Democratic Unionist Party (then the Democratic Party) by its president, Han Myung-sook. She was nominated as an MP candidate for Gwangmyeong 2nd constituency, and defeated the incumbent Chun Jae-hui of the Saenuri Party. She was re-elected to the same constituency in 2016.

During the 2017 presidential election, Lee criticised Moon Jae-in, the presidential candidate for Democratic Party. On 6 April, she shifted to the People's Party and endorsed its candidate, Ahn Cheol-soo. At that time, the approval rate of Ahn was as high as Moon, after her endorsement by several anti-Moon politicians. Meanwhile, Ahn's approving then dropped and finished as 3rd (21.41%), approximately half of Moon.

Lee unsuccessfully ran for the party president on 27 August. She supported the party's merger with the Bareun Party, and joined the Bareunmirae Party in the early 2018. In November 2018, sources reported that she would join the Liberty Korea Party.

On 23 April 2019, Lee left Bareunmirae.

In the 2020 election, Lee was nominated as the United Future candidate for Busan South 2nd constituency. However, she lost to the Democratic candidate and incumbent MP Park Jae-ho.

=== 2021 Busan mayoral election ===
The resignation of the Mayor of Busan Oh Keo-don on 23 April 2020 following the allegations of sexual harassment has provoked the by-election in 2021.

On 17 December 2020, Lee announced her intention to run for the Busan mayorship at Convention Hall of Busan Exhibition and Convention Centre (BEXCO). She cited a sexual harassment controversy related to the former Mayor Oh and indicated that the by-elections must be the "base" of the regime change. The following was her manifesto included in her declaration:

- To combat the COVID-19 pandemic:
  - 1 million won (£640.50) monthly income per person
  - Free self-test kits
- Building a new airport (replacing the incumbent Gimhae International Airport) in Gadeokdo
- Establishing a 'happy city for mothers and families'
- Developing Busan as a maritime city
- Administrative, social and cultural innovation

Lee contested PPP preselection on 4 March 2021, but lost to the former MP for Suyeong Park Hyung-joon and the former Deputy Mayor Park Seong-hun.

== Public orientation ==
Formerly, Lee positioned herself as a centrist. She is now considered part of the Korean far-right, supporting a market economy, a stronger security policy, and holding a conservative outlook on issues such as immigration. However, she considers herself as centre-right liberal.

=== Economy ===
Lee is a capitalist who supports market economy and opposes the increase of minimum wages and pro-labour policies. She criticised President Moon's economic policy as socialism, and stated that "the US is enjoying prosperity due to capitalism". She does not oppose economic democracy but says that "leftists have ruined its original meaning".

Lee was widely criticised after she called school canteen cooks "cooking moms".

=== Immigration ===
Lee denounced the Yemeni refugees on Jeju Island as "impostors seeking jobs and money" and opposes them. She said, "South Korean conservatives must ensure the view towards immigration policy". She wants to reduce the number of foreign workers and mentioned that the government should prioritise locals. Lee also advocates for harsher policy for illegal immigrants.

== Personal life ==
Lee is married to Choi Won-jae, a professor at Kyung Hee University. She gave birth to a son in 2009.

== Election results ==
=== General elections ===
Year	Election	Constituency	Political party	Votes (%)	Remarks
2012	19th National Assembly General Election	Gwangmyeong B (Gyeonggi)	DUP	43,441 (50.09%)	Won
2016	20th National Assembly General Election	Gwangmyeong B (Gyeonggi)	Democratic	50,195 (52.18%)	Won
2020	21st National Assembly General Election	Nam B (Busan)	UFP	39,575 (48.74%)	Defeated (2nd)
2024	22nd National Assembly General Election	Yongin D (Gyeonggi)	Democratic	82,156 (51.06%)	Won
