= Byeon Sung-wan =

South Korean politician

- 변성완
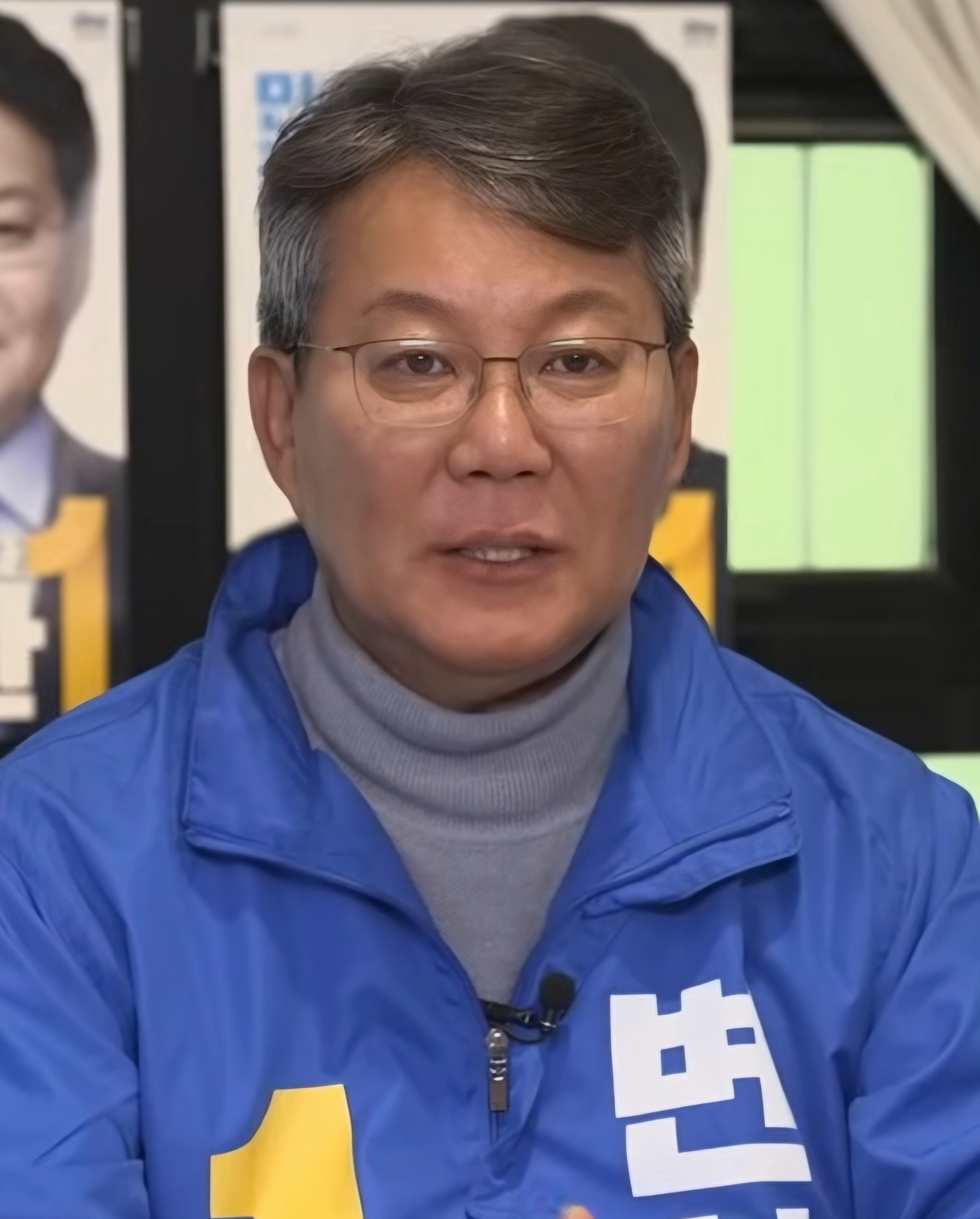
- Byeon in 2024

Mayor of Busan
- Acting
- In office 23 April 2020 – 26 January 2021
- Preceded by: Oh Keo-don
- Succeeded by: Kim Sun-jo (acting); Lee Byung-jin (acting); Park Heong-joon

Vice Mayor of Busan for Administrative Affairs
- In office 30 January 2019 – 26 January 2021
- Preceded by: Jeong Hyun-min
- Succeeded by: Kim Sun-jo

Personal details
- Born: 5 September 1965 (age 61) Busan, South Korea
- Party: Democratic
- Education: Korea University

Byeon Sung-wan (Korean: 변성완; Hanja: 邊城完; born 5 September 1965) is a South Korean politician served as the acting mayor of Busan from 2020 to 2021.

After passing the state exam in 1994, Byeon has dedicated his career in public service - mostly at now-Ministry of the Interior and Safety and Busan City government.

Byeon served as the last administrator for protocol to President Roh Moo-hyun. After working at the Interior Ministry's department for local government taxation and its Office for Planning and Coordination, he served as the head of Planning & Coordination Office of Busan City government under conservative Mayor Suh Byung-soo. Byeon then went back to the Ministry where he served as its spokesperson. In January 2019 Byeon was appointed as the second Vice Mayor of Busan under liberal Mayor Oh Keo-don. After Oh resigned due to his sexual harassment, Byeon led the city government as its Acting Mayor.

In January 2021, Byeon resigned from acting mayor of Busan and announced his campaign for Busan Mayor in its upcoming by-election in April. He joined the Democratic Party and is expected to run against Kim Young-choon at party primary.

Byeon's spouse, Cho Kyu-young, is also a democratic politician served as a member of Seoul Metropolitan Council from 2006 to 2018 and its deputy speaker from 2016 to 2018.

Byeon holds a bachelor's degree in administration from Korea University.

== Election results ==
=== General elections ===
Year	Elections	Constituency	Political party	Votes (%)	Results
2024	22nd National Assembly General Election	Gangseo (Busan)	Democratic	33,645 (44.41%)	Defeated (2nd)

=== Local elections ===
==== Mayor of Busan ====
Year	Elections	Constituency	Political party	Votes (%)	Remarks
2022	8th Iocal Election	Busan (Mayoral Elections)	Democratic	455,901 (32.23%)	Defeated (2nd)
