= Bae Deok-kwang =

South Korean politician (1948–2023)

Member of the National Assembly of South Korea
- In office 31 July 2014 – 29 January 2018
- Preceded by: Suh Byung-soo
- Succeeded by: Yun June-ho
- Constituency: Haeundae–Gijang A, Busan (2014–2016); Haeundae B, Busan (2016–2018)

Personal details
- Born: 22 June 1948 Changwon, United States Army Military Government in Korea
- Died: 24 February 2023 (aged 74) Busan, South Korea
- Party: People Power Party
- Education: Dong-a University; Pusan National University; Kyungsung University
- Occupation: Accountant

Bae Deok-kwang (Korean: 배덕광; 22 June 1948 – 24 February 2023) was a South Korean accountant and politician. A member of the Saenuri Party, he served in the National Assembly from 2014 to 2018.

Bae died in Busan on 24 February 2023, at the age of 74.

== Election results ==
=== General elections ===
Year	Elections	Constituency	Political party	Votes (%)	Results
2014	2014 By-election	Haeundae–Gijang A (Busan)	Saenuri	37,012 (65.60%)	Won
2016	20th National Assembly General Election	Haeundae B (Busan)	Saenuri	40,905 (49.65%)	Won

=== Local elections ===
==== Mayor of Busan Haeundae ====
Year	Elections	Constituency	Political party	Votes (%)	Remarks
2004	2004 By-election	Mayor of Busan Haeundae	GNP	59,648 (63.79%)	Won
2004	4th Iocal Election	Mayor of Busan Haeundae	GNP	101,390 (70.80%)	Won
2010	5th Iocal Election	Mayor of Haeundae	GNP	78,743 (51.81%)	Won
