= War of Words =

War of Words may refer to:

- War of Words (Fight album), 1993
- War of Words (Singers & Players album)
- War of Words (TV program), a JTBC TV show
