= Ahn Sang-yeong =

South Korean politician (1938–2004)

Mayor of Busan
- In office May 20, 1988 – December 27, 1990
- Preceded by: Kang Tae-hong
- Succeeded by: Kim Young-hwan
- In office July 1, 1998 – October 24, 2003
- Preceded by: Moon Jung-soo
- Succeeded by: Hur Nam-sik

Personal details
- Born: November 18, 1938 Gwangyang County, Zenranan Province (South Jeolla Province), Korea, Empire of Japan
- Died: February 4, 2004 (aged 65) Busan, South Korea
- Education: Seoul National University

- Ahn Sang-yeong
- Hangul: 안상영
- Hanja: 安相英
- RR: An Sangyeong
- MR: An Sangyŏng

Ahn Sang-yeong (Korean: 안상영; November 18, 1938 – February 4, 2004) was a South Korean politician who served as the mayor of Busan from 1988 to 1990 and from 1998 to 2003.

Ahn was educated at Busan High School, and graduated from Seoul National University with a degree in Civil Engineering in 1963.

Ahn was implicated in a bribery scandal involving the Jinheung company, and killed himself on February 4, 2004.

== Election results ==
=== Local elections ===
==== Mayor of Busan ====
Year	Elections	Constituency	Political party	Votes (%)	Results
1998	2nd Iocal Election	Busan (Mayoral Elections)	GNP	558,909 (45.14%)	Won
2002	3rd Iocal Election	Busan (Mayoral Elections)	GNP	729,589 (63.76%)	Won
