= 2014 South Korean local elections =

- 4 June 2014

17 regional heads 789 regional councilors 226 municipal mayors 2,898 municipal councilors
- Registered: 41,296,228
- Turnout: 23,462,336; 56.8% (▲2.3pp)
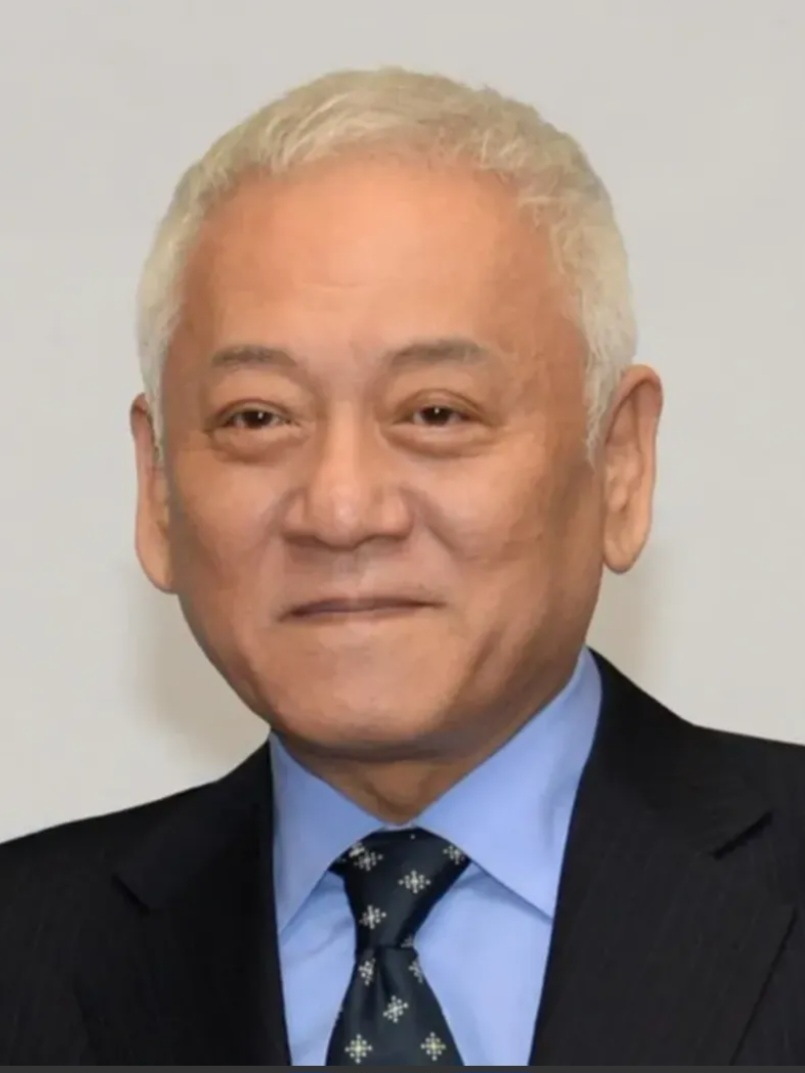

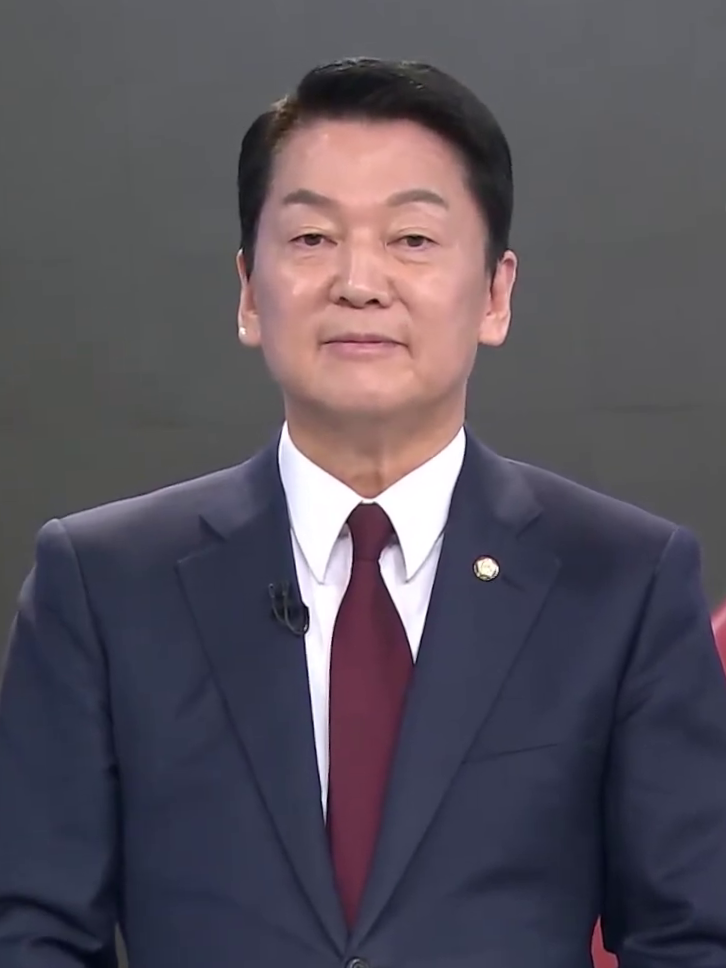

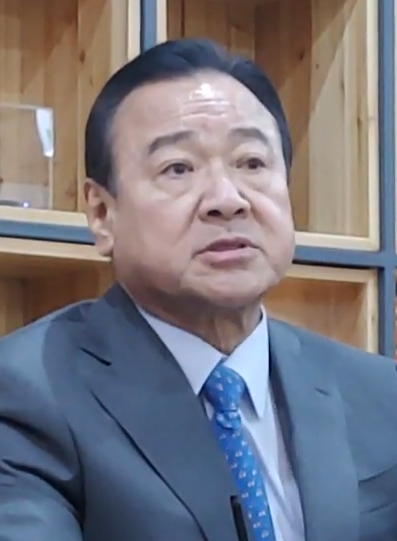
| | First party | Second party |
|---|---|---|
| Leader | Kim Han-gil; Ahn Cheol-soo | Lee Wan-koo |
| Party | NPAD | Saenuri |
| Regional seats last election | 7 heads 360 councilors | 7 heads 332 councilors |
| Municipal seats last election | 92 mayors 1,025 councilors | 95 mayors 1,383 councilors |
| Regional seats won | 9 heads 349 councilors | 8 heads 416 councilors |
| Regional seat change | ▲2 heads ▼11 councilors | ▲1 head ▲84 councilors |
| Municipal seats won | 80 mayors 1,157 councilors | 117 mayors 1,413 councilors |
| Municipal seat change | ▼12 mayors ▲132 councilors | ▲22 mayors ▲30 councilors |

The 6th local elections were held in South Korea on 4 June 2014.

== Regional head elections ==
| Party | Votes | % | Seats | +/– |
|---|---|---|---|---|
| Saenuri Party | 10,735,126 | 46.89 | 8 | +1 |
| New Politics Alliance for Democracy | 10,384,406 | 45.36 | 9 | +2 |
| Unified Progressive Party | 456,606 | 1.99 | 0 | 0 |
| Justice Party | 207,613 | 0.91 | 0 | New |
| Labor Party | 44,892 | 0.20 | 0 | New |
| New Politics Party | 21,240 | 0.09 | 0 | New |
| Independents | 1,044,118 | 4.56 | 0 | 0 |
| Total | 22,894,001 | 100.00 | 17 | +1 |
| Valid votes | 22,894,001 | 97.58 | | |
| Invalid/blank votes | 568,335 | 2.42 | | |
| Total votes | 23,462,336 | 100.00 | | |
| Registered voters/turnout | 41,296,228 | 56.81 | | |
Source: National Election Commission

=== Summary ===
| Province/City | Head | Incumbent | Party | Elected | Party |
|---|---|---|---|---|---|
| Seoul | Mayor | Park Won-soon | NPAD | Park Won-soon | NPAD |
| Busan | Mayor | Hur Nam-sik | Saenuri | Suh Byung-soo | Saenuri |
| Daegu | Mayor | Kim Bum-il | Saenuri | Kwon Young-jin | Saenuri |
| Incheon | Mayor | Song Young-gil | NPAD | Yoo Jeong-bok | Saenuri |
| Gwangju | Mayor | Kang Woon-tae | NPAD | Yoon Jang-hyun | NPAD |
| Daejeon | Mayor | Yeom Hong-cheol | Saenuri | Kwon Sun-taek | NPAD |
| Ulsan | Mayor | Park Sung-hwan (acting) | Independent | Kim Gi-hyeon | Saenuri |
| Sejong | Mayor | Yoo Han-sik | Saenuri | Lee Choon-hee | NPAD |
| Gyeonggi | Governor | Kim Moon-soo | Saenuri | Nam Kyung-pil | Saenuri |
| Gangwon | Governor | Choi Moon-soon | NPAD | Choi Moon-soon | NPAD |
| North Chungcheong | Governor | Lee Si-jong | NPAD | Lee Si-jong | NPAD |
| South Chungcheong | Governor | Ahn Hee-jung | NPAD | Ahn Hee-jung | NPAD |
| North Jeolla | Governor | Kim Wan-ju | NPAD | Song Ha-jin | NPAD |
| South Jeolla | Governor | Park Jun-young | NPAD | Lee Nak-yon | NPAD |
| North Gyeongsang | Governor | Kim Kwan-yong | Saenuri | Kim Kwan-yong | Saenuri |
| South Gyeongsang | Governor | Hong Joon-pyo | Saenuri | Hong Joon-pyo | Saenuri |
| Jeju | Governor | Woo Geun-min | Saenuri | Won Hee-ryong | Saenuri |

=== Seoul ===
| Candidate | Party | Votes | % |
|---|---|---|---|
| Park Won-soon (incumbent) | New Politics Alliance for Democracy | 2,752,171 | 56.13 |
| Chung Mong-joon | Saenuri Party | 2,109,869 | 43.03 |
| Chung Tae-heung | Unified Progressive Party | 23,638 | 0.48 |
| Hong Jung-shik | New Politics Party | 17,603 | 0.36 |
| Total | | 4,903,281 | 100.00 |
| Valid votes | | 4,903,281 | 99.08 |
| Invalid/blank votes | | 45,616 | 0.92 |
| Total votes | | 4,948,897 | 100.00 |
| Registered voters/turnout | | 8,441,594 | 58.63 |
| NPAD hold | | | |
Source: National Election Commission

=== Busan ===
| Candidate | Party | Votes | % |
|---|---|---|---|
| Suh Byung-soo | Saenuri Party | 797,926 | 50.66 |
| Oh Keo-don | Independent | 777,225 | 49.34 |
| Total | | 1,575,151 | 100.00 |
| Valid votes | | 1,575,151 | 96.68 |
| Invalid/blank votes | | 54,016 | 3.32 |
| Total votes | | 1,629,167 | 100.00 |
| Registered voters/turnout | | 2,932,179 | 55.56 |
| Saenuri hold | | | |
Source: National Election Commission

=== Daegu ===
| Candidate | Party | Votes | % |
|---|---|---|---|
| Kwon Young-jin | Saenuri Party | 581,175 | 55.96 |
| Kim Boo-kyum | New Politics Alliance for Democracy | 418,891 | 40.33 |
| Lee Jung-sook | Independent | 14,774 | 1.42 |
| Lee Won-joon | Justice Party | 12,922 | 1.24 |
| Song Young-woo | Unified Progressive Party | 10,857 | 1.05 |
| Total | | 1,038,619 | 100.00 |
| Valid votes | | 1,038,619 | 98.67 |
| Invalid/blank votes | | 14,019 | 1.33 |
| Total votes | | 1,052,638 | 100.00 |
| Registered voters/turnout | | 2,012,579 | 52.30 |
| Saenuri hold | | | |
Source: National Election Commission

=== Incheon ===
| Candidate | Party | Votes | % |
|---|---|---|---|
| Yoo Jeong-bok | Saenuri Party | 615,077 | 49.95 |
| Song Young-gil (incumbent) | New Politics Alliance for Democracy | 593,555 | 48.21 |
| Shin Chang-hyun | Unified Progressive Party | 22,651 | 1.84 |
| Total | | 1,231,283 | 100.00 |
| Valid votes | | 1,231,283 | 98.94 |
| Invalid/blank votes | | 13,219 | 1.06 |
| Total votes | | 1,244,502 | 100.00 |
| Registered voters/turnout | | 2,319,198 | 53.66 |
| Saenuri gain from NPAD | | | |
Source: National Election Commission

=== Gwangju ===
| Candidate | Party | Votes | % |
|---|---|---|---|
| Yoon Jang-hyun | New Politics Alliance for Democracy | 367,203 | 57.85 |
| Kang Woon-tae (incumbent) | Independent | 201,666 | 31.77 |
| Lee Jung-jae | Saenuri Party | 21,614 | 3.41 |
| Yoon Min-ho | Unified Progressive Party | 21,200 | 3.34 |
| Lee Byung-wan | Independent | 16,249 | 2.56 |
| Lee Byung-hoon | Labor Party | 6,785 | 1.07 |
| Total | | 634,717 | 100.00 |
| Valid votes | | 634,717 | 97.65 |
| Invalid/blank votes | | 15,291 | 2.35 |
| Total votes | | 650,008 | 100.00 |
| Registered voters/turnout | | 1,138,418 | 57.10 |
| NPAD gain from Independent | | | |
Source: National Election Commission

=== Daejeon ===
| Candidate | Party | Votes | % |
|---|---|---|---|
| Kwon Sun-taek | New Politics Alliance for Democracy | 322,762 | 50.08 |
| Park Sung-hyo | Saenuri Party | 301,389 | 46.76 |
| Han Chang-min | Justice Party | 11,346 | 1.76 |
| Kim Chang-geun | Unified Progressive Party | 9,009 | 1.40 |
| Total | | 644,506 | 100.00 |
| Valid votes | | 644,506 | 98.75 |
| Invalid/blank votes | | 8,165 | 1.25 |
| Total votes | | 652,671 | 100.00 |
| Registered voters/turnout | | 1,207,972 | 54.03 |
| NPAD gain from Saenuri | | | |
Source: National Election Commission

=== Ulsan ===
| Candidate | Party | Votes | % |
|---|---|---|---|
| Kim Gi-hyeon | Saenuri Party | 306,311 | 65.43 |
| Cho Seung-soo | Justice Party | 123,736 | 26.43 |
| Lee Gap-yong | Labor Party | 38,107 | 8.14 |
| Total | | 468,154 | 100.00 |
| Valid votes | | 468,154 | 91.46 |
| Invalid/blank votes | | 43,727 | 8.54 |
| Total votes | | 511,881 | 100.00 |
| Registered voters/turnout | | 912,325 | 56.11 |
| Saenuri gain | | | |
Source: National Election Commission

=== Sejong ===
| Candidate | Party | Votes | % |
|---|---|---|---|
| Lee Choon-hee | New Politics Alliance for Democracy | 36,203 | 57.78 |
| Yoo Han-sik (incumbent) | Saenuri Party | 26,451 | 42.22 |
| Total | | 62,654 | 100.00 |
| Valid votes | | 62,654 | 98.47 |
| Invalid/blank votes | | 975 | 1.53 |
| Total votes | | 63,629 | 100.00 |
| Registered voters/turnout | | 101,559 | 62.65 |
| NPAD gain from Saenuri | | | |
Source: National Election Commission

=== Gyeonggi ===
| Candidate | Party | Votes | % |
|---|---|---|---|
| Nam Kyung-pil | Saenuri Party | 2,524,981 | 50.43 |
| Kim Jin-pyo | New Politics Alliance for Democracy | 2,481,824 | 49.57 |
| Total | | 5,006,805 | 100.00 |
| Valid votes | | 5,006,805 | 97.09 |
| Invalid/blank votes | | 149,886 | 2.91 |
| Total votes | | 5,156,691 | 100.00 |
| Registered voters/turnout | | 9,679,317 | 53.28 |
| Saenuri hold | | | |
Source: National Election Commission

=== Gangwon ===
| Candidate | Party | Votes | % |
|---|---|---|---|
| Choi Moon-soon (incumbent) | New Politics Alliance for Democracy | 381,338 | 49.76 |
| Choi Heung-jip | Saenuri Party | 369,201 | 48.18 |
| Lee Seung-jae | Unified Progressive Party | 15,774 | 2.06 |
| Total | | 766,313 | 100.00 |
| Valid votes | | 766,313 | 98.07 |
| Invalid/blank votes | | 15,046 | 1.93 |
| Total votes | | 781,359 | 100.00 |
| Registered voters/turnout | | 1,255,469 | 62.24 |
| NPAD hold | | | |
Source: National Election Commission

=== North Chungcheong ===
| Candidate | Party | Votes | % |
|---|---|---|---|
| Lee Si-jong (incumbent) | New Politics Alliance for Democracy | 361,115 | 49.75 |
| Yoon Jin-sik | Saenuri Party | 346,152 | 47.69 |
| Shin Jang-ho | Unified Progressive Party | 18,590 | 2.56 |
| Total | | 725,857 | 100.00 |
| Valid votes | | 725,857 | 97.95 |
| Invalid/blank votes | | 15,192 | 2.05 |
| Total votes | | 741,049 | 100.00 |
| Registered voters/turnout | | 1,261,119 | 58.76 |
| NPAD hold | | | |
Source: National Election Commission

=== South Chungcheong ===
| Candidate | Party | Votes | % |
|---|---|---|---|
| Ahn Hee-jung (incumbent) | New Politics Alliance for Democracy | 465,994 | 52.21 |
| Chung Jin-suk | Saenuri Party | 392,315 | 43.96 |
| Kim Ki-moon | Independent | 34,204 | 3.83 |
| Total | | 892,513 | 100.00 |
| Valid votes | | 892,513 | 97.41 |
| Invalid/blank votes | | 23,693 | 2.59 |
| Total votes | | 916,206 | 100.00 |
| Registered voters/turnout | | 1,644,554 | 55.71 |
| NPAD hold | | | |
Source: National Election Commission

=== North Jeolla ===
| Candidate | Party | Votes | % |
|---|---|---|---|
| Song Ha-jin | New Politics Alliance for Democracy | 599,654 | 69.23 |
| Park Chul-gon | Saenuri Party | 177,172 | 20.45 |
| Lee Kwang-seok | Unified Progressive Party | 89,337 | 10.31 |
| Total | | 866,163 | 100.00 |
| Valid votes | | 866,163 | 96.24 |
| Invalid/blank votes | | 33,866 | 3.76 |
| Total votes | | 900,029 | 100.00 |
| Registered voters/turnout | | 1,503,242 | 59.87 |
| NPAD hold | | | |
Source: National Election Commission

=== South Jeolla ===
| Candidate | Party | Votes | % |
|---|---|---|---|
| Lee Nak-yon | New Politics Alliance for Democracy | 755,233 | 77.97 |
| Lee Sung-soo | Unified Progressive Party | 120,868 | 12.48 |
| Lee Joong-hyo | Saenuri Party | 92,549 | 9.55 |
| Total | | 968,650 | 100.00 |
| Valid votes | | 968,650 | 95.37 |
| Invalid/blank votes | | 47,038 | 4.63 |
| Total votes | | 1,015,688 | 100.00 |
| Registered voters/turnout | | 1,549,440 | 65.55 |
| NPAD hold | | | |
Source: National Election Commission

=== North Gyeongsang ===
| Candidate | Party | Votes | % |
|---|---|---|---|
| Kim Kwan-yong (incumbent) | Saenuri Party | 986,989 | 77.74 |
| Oh Joong-gi | New Politics Alliance for Democracy | 189,603 | 14.93 |
| Park Chang-ho | Justice Party | 59,609 | 4.69 |
| Yoon Byung-tae | Unified Progressive Party | 33,458 | 2.64 |
| Total | | 1,269,659 | 100.00 |
| Valid votes | | 1,269,659 | 96.56 |
| Invalid/blank votes | | 45,266 | 3.44 |
| Total votes | | 1,314,925 | 100.00 |
| Registered voters/turnout | | 2,211,734 | 59.45 |
| Saenuri hold | | | |
Source: National Election Commission

=== South Gyeongsang ===
| Candidate | Party | Votes | % |
|---|---|---|---|
| Hong Joon-pyo (incumbent) | Saenuri Party | 913,162 | 58.86 |
| Kim Kyoung-soo | New Politics Alliance for Democracy | 559,367 | 36.05 |
| Kang Byung-ki | Unified Progressive Party | 79,015 | 5.09 |
| Total | | 1,551,544 | 100.00 |
| Valid votes | | 1,551,544 | 97.60 |
| Invalid/blank votes | | 38,129 | 2.40 |
| Total votes | | 1,589,673 | 100.00 |
| Registered voters/turnout | | 2,658,347 | 59.80 |
| Saenuri hold | | | |
Source: National Election Commission

=== Jeju ===
| Candidate | Party | Votes | % |
|---|---|---|---|
| Won Hee-ryong | Saenuri Party | 172,793 | 59.97 |
| Shin Koo-bum | New Politics Alliance for Democracy | 99,493 | 34.53 |
| Goh Seung-wan | Unified Progressive Party | 12,209 | 4.24 |
| Joo Jong-geun | New Politics Party | 3,637 | 1.26 |
| Total | | 288,132 | 100.00 |
| Valid votes | | 288,132 | 98.23 |
| Invalid/blank votes | | 5,191 | 1.77 |
| Total votes | | 293,323 | 100.00 |
| Registered voters/turnout | | 467,182 | 62.79 |
| Saenuri hold | | | |
Source: National Election Commission

== Regional council elections ==
| Party | Proportional | | | Constituency | | | Total seats | +/– |
| Party | Votes | % | Seats | Votes | % | Seats | Total seats | +/– |
|---|---|---|---|---|---|---|---|---|
| Saenuri Party | 11,063,916 | 48.47 | 41 | 9,903,211 | 45.95 | 375 | 416 | +84 |
| New Politics Alliance for Democracy | 9,411,492 | 41.23 | 40 | 8,529,490 | 39.57 | 309 | 349 | –11 |
| Unified Progressive Party | 973,225 | 4.26 | 3 | 536,220 | 2.49 | 0 | 3 | –26 |
| Justice Party | 823,785 | 3.61 | 0 | 103,224 | 0.48 | 0 | 0 | New |
| Labor Party | 267,055 | 1.17 | 0 | 214,115 | 0.99 | 1 | 1 | New |
| Green Party Korea | 170,768 | 0.75 | 0 | 7,739 | 0.04 | 0 | 0 | New |
| New Politics Party | 64,053 | 0.28 | 0 | 13,320 | 0.06 | 0 | 0 | New |
| Hannara Party | 35,488 | 0.16 | 0 | | | | 0 | New |
| Republican Party | 8,578 | 0.04 | 0 | | | | 0 | New |
| International Green Party | 6,795 | 0.03 | 0 | | | | 0 | 0 |
| Independents | | | | 2,246,544 | 10.42 | 20 | 20 | –16 |
| Total | 22,825,155 | 100.00 | 84 | 21,553,863 | 100.00 | 705 | 789 | +28 |
| Valid votes | 22,825,155 | 97.32 | | 21,553,863 | 97.35 | | | |
| Invalid/blank votes | 628,225 | 2.68 | | 587,150 | 2.65 | | | |
| Total votes | 23,453,380 | 100.00 | | 22,141,013 | 100.00 | | | |
| Registered voters/turnout | 41,296,228 | 56.79 | | 39,032,462 | 56.72 | | | |
Source: National Election Commission

=== Results by province or city ===
| Province/City | Seats | Saenuri | NPAD | UPP | LP | IND |
|---|---|---|---|---|---|---|
| Seoul | 106 | 29 | 77 | | | |
| Busan | 47 | 45 | 2 | | | |
| Daegu | 30 | 29 | 1 | | | |
| Incheon | 35 | 23 | 12 | | | |
| Gwangju | 22 | | 21 | 1 | | |
| Daejeon | 22 | 6 | 16 | | | |
| Ulsan | 22 | 21 | 1 | | | |
| Sejong | 15 | 5 | 9 | | | 1 |
| Gyeonggi | 128 | 50 | 78 | | | |
| Gangwon | 44 | 36 | 6 | | | 2 |
| North Chungcheong | 31 | 21 | 10 | | | |
| South Chungcheong | 40 | 30 | 10 | | | |
| North Jeolla | 38 | 1 | 34 | 1 | | 2 |
| South Jeolla | 58 | 1 | 52 | 1 | | 4 |
| North Gyeongsang | 60 | 52 | 2 | | | 6 |
| South Gyeongsang | 55 | 50 | 2 | | 1 | 2 |
| Jeju | 36 | 17 | 16 | | | 3 |
| Total | 789 | 416 | 349 | 3 | 1 | 20 |
Source: National Election Commission

=== Constituency seats ===
| Province/City | Seats | Saenuri | NPAD | LP | IND |
|---|---|---|---|---|---|
| Seoul | 96 | 24 | 72 | | |
| Busan | 42 | 42 | | | |
| Daegu | 27 | 27 | | | |
| Incheon | 31 | 21 | 10 | | |
| Gwangju | 19 | | 19 | | |
| Daejeon | 19 | 5 | 14 | | |
| Ulsan | 19 | 19 | | | |
| Sejong | 13 | 4 | 8 | | 1 |
| Gyeonggi | 116 | 44 | 72 | | |
| Gangwon | 40 | 34 | 4 | | 2 |
| North Chungcheong | 28 | 19 | 9 | | |
| South Chungcheong | 36 | 28 | 8 | | |
| North Jeolla | 34 | | 32 | | 2 |
| South Jeolla | 52 | | 48 | | 4 |
| North Gyeongsang | 54 | 48 | | | 6 |
| South Gyeongsang | 50 | 47 | | 1 | 2 |
| Jeju | 29 | 13 | 13 | | 3 |
| Total | 705 | 375 | 309 | 1 | 20 |
Source: National Election Commission

=== Proportional representation seats ===
| Province/City | Seats | Saenuri | NPAD | UPP |
|---|---|---|---|---|
| Seoul | 10 | 5 | 5 | |
| Busan | 5 | 3 | 2 | |
| Daegu | 3 | 2 | 1 | |
| Incheon | 4 | 2 | 2 | |
| Gwangju | 3 | | 2 | 1 |
| Daejeon | 3 | 1 | 2 | |
| Ulsan | 3 | 2 | 1 | |
| Sejong | 2 | 1 | 1 | |
| Gyeonggi | 12 | 6 | 6 | |
| Gangwon | 4 | 2 | 2 | |
| North Chungcheong | 3 | 2 | 1 | |
| South Chungcheong | 4 | 2 | 2 | |
| North Jeolla | 4 | 1 | 2 | 1 |
| South Jeolla | 6 | 1 | 4 | 1 |
| North Gyeongsang | 6 | 4 | 2 | |
| South Gyeongsang | 5 | 3 | 2 | |
| Jeju | 7 | 4 | 3 | |
| Total | 84 | 41 | 40 | 3 |
Source: National Election Commission

== Municipal mayoral elections ==
| Party | Votes | % | Seats | +/– |
|---|---|---|---|---|
| Saenuri Party | 9,863,138 | 43.97 | 117 | +22 |
| New Politics Alliance for Democracy | 8,829,609 | 39.36 | 80 | –12 |
| Unified Progressive Party | 427,874 | 1.91 | 0 | –3 |
| Justice Party | 146,346 | 0.65 | 0 | New |
| New Politics Party | 26,006 | 0.12 | 0 | New |
| Green Party Korea | 7,121 | 0.03 | 0 | New |
| Labor Party | 4,386 | 0.02 | 0 | New |
| Corea Global Community Party | 2,652 | 0.01 | 0 | New |
| Republican Party | 398 | 0.00 | 0 | New |
| Independents | 3,124,341 | 13.93 | 29 | –7 |
| Total | 22,431,871 | 100.00 | 226 | –2 |
| Valid votes | 22,431,871 | 97.87 | | |
| Invalid/blank votes | 489,046 | 2.13 | | |
| Total votes | 22,920,917 | 100.00 | | |
| Registered voters/turnout | 40,380,237 | 56.76 | | |
Source: National Election Commission

=== Results by province or city ===
| Province/City | Mayors | Saenuri | NPAD | IND |
|---|---|---|---|---|
| Seoul | 25 | 5 | 20 | |
| Busan | 16 | 15 | | 1 |
| Daegu | 8 | 8 | | |
| Incheon | 10 | 6 | 3 | 1 |
| Gwangju | 5 | | 5 | |
| Daejeon | 5 | 1 | 4 | |
| Ulsan | 5 | 5 | | |
| Gyeonggi | 31 | 13 | 17 | 1 |
| Gangwon | 18 | 15 | 1 | 2 |
| North Chungcheong | 11 | 6 | 3 | 2 |
| South Chungcheong | 15 | 9 | 5 | 1 |
| North Jeolla | 14 | | 7 | 7 |
| South Jeolla | 22 | | 14 | 8 |
| North Gyeongsang | 23 | 20 | | 3 |
| South Gyeongsang | 18 | 14 | 1 | 3 |
| Total | 226 | 117 | 80 | 29 |
Source: National Election Commission

== Municipal council elections ==
| Party | Proportional | | | Constituency | | | Total seats | +/– |
| Party | Votes | % | Seats | Votes | % | Seats | Total seats | +/– |
|---|---|---|---|---|---|---|---|---|
| Saenuri Party | 9,602,401 | 49.01 | 207 | 10,014,175 | 46.11 | 1,206 | 1,413 | +30 |
| New Politics Alliance for Democracy | 9,040,141 | 46.14 | 168 | 7,658,369 | 35.26 | 989 | 1,157 | +132 |
| Unified Progressive Party | 673,525 | 3.44 | 3 | 634,931 | 2.92 | 31 | 34 | –105 |
| Justice Party | 225,409 | 1.15 | 1 | 268,701 | 1.24 | 10 | 11 | New |
| Labor Party | 31,834 | 0.16 | 0 | 75,788 | 0.35 | 6 | 6 | New |
| New Politics Party | 16,849 | 0.09 | 0 | 7,619 | 0.04 | 0 | 0 | New |
| Republican Party | 1,172 | 0.01 | 0 | | | | 0 | New |
| Green Party Korea | | | | 15,354 | 0.07 | 0 | 0 | New |
| Hannara Party | | | | 260 | 0.00 | 0 | 0 | New |
| Independents | | | | 3,041,433 | 14.01 | 277 | 277 | –16 |
| Total | 19,591,331 | 100.00 | 379 | 21,716,630 | 100.00 | 2,519 | 2,898 | +10 |
| Valid votes | 19,591,331 | 96.92 | | 21,716,630 | 96.30 | | | |
| Invalid/blank votes | 622,557 | 3.08 | | 835,461 | 3.70 | | | |
| Total votes | 20,213,888 | 100.00 | | 22,552,091 | 100.00 | | | |
| Registered voters/turnout | 35,965,453 | 56.20 | | 39,777,060 | 56.70 | | | |
Source: National Election Commission

=== Results by province and city ===
| Province/City | Seats | Saenuri | NPAD | UPP | JP | LP | IND |
|---|---|---|---|---|---|---|---|
| Seoul | 419 | 196 | 219 | | | 1 | 3 |
| Busan | 182 | 108 | 66 | 1 | | | 7 |
| Daegu | 116 | 87 | 13 | | 2 | 1 | 13 |
| Incheon | 116 | 63 | 49 | | 2 | 1 | 1 |
| Gwangju | 68 | 1 | 56 | 9 | | | 2 |
| Daejeon | 63 | 30 | 33 | | | | |
| Ulsan | 50 | 35 | 4 | 9 | | 1 | 1 |
| Gyeonggi | 431 | 214 | 207 | 1 | 2 | | 7 |
| Gangwon | 169 | 105 | 48 | | | | 16 |
| North Chungcheong | 131 | 79 | 42 | 1 | | | 9 |
| South Chungcheong | 169 | 99 | 59 | | | | 11 |
| North Jeolla | 197 | 4 | 139 | | 2 | | 52 |
| South Jeolla | 243 | | 183 | 7 | 2 | | 51 |
| North Gyeongsang | 284 | 219 | 5 | | 1 | | 59 |
| South Gyeongsang | 260 | 173 | 34 | 6 | | 2 | 45 |
| Total | 2,898 | 1,413 | 1,157 | 34 | 11 | 6 | 277 |
Source: National Election Commission

=== Constituency seats ===
| Province/City | Seats | Saenuri | NPAD | UPP | JP | LP | IND |
|---|---|---|---|---|---|---|---|
| Seoul | 366 | 171 | 191 | | | 1 | 3 |
| Busan | 158 | 92 | 58 | 1 | | | 7 |
| Daegu | 102 | 77 | 9 | | 2 | 1 | 13 |
| Incheon | 101 | 53 | 44 | | 2 | 1 | 1 |
| Gwangju | 59 | 1 | 47 | 9 | | | 2 |
| Daejeon | 54 | 26 | 28 | | | | |
| Ulsan | 43 | 30 | 2 | 9 | | 1 | 1 |
| Gyeonggi | 376 | 184 | 182 | 1 | 2 | | 7 |
| Gangwon | 146 | 86 | 44 | | | | 16 |
| North Chungcheong | 114 | 66 | 38 | 1 | | | 9 |
| South Chungcheong | 144 | 84 | 49 | | | | 11 |
| North Jeolla | 173 | | 119 | | 2 | | 52 |
| South Jeolla | 211 | | 155 | 4 | 1 | | 51 |
| North Gyeongsang | 247 | 185 | 2 | | 1 | | 59 |
| South Gyeongsang | 225 | 151 | 21 | 6 | | 2 | 45 |
| Total | 2,519 | 1,206 | 989 | 31 | 10 | 6 | 277 |
Source: National Election Commission

=== Proportional representation seats ===
| Province/City | Seats | Saenuri | NPAD | UPP | JP |
|---|---|---|---|---|---|
| Seoul | 53 | 25 | 28 | | |
| Busan | 24 | 16 | 8 | | |
| Daegu | 14 | 10 | 4 | | |
| Incheon | 15 | 10 | 5 | | |
| Gwangju | 9 | | 9 | | |
| Daejeon | 9 | 4 | 5 | | |
| Ulsan | 7 | 5 | 2 | | |
| Gyeonggi | 55 | 30 | 25 | | |
| Gangwon | 23 | 19 | 4 | | |
| North Chungcheong | 17 | 13 | 4 | | |
| South Chungcheong | 25 | 15 | 10 | | |
| North Jeolla | 24 | 4 | 20 | | |
| South Jeolla | 32 | | 28 | 3 | 1 |
| North Gyeongsang | 37 | 34 | 3 | | |
| South Gyeongsang | 35 | 22 | 13 | | |
| Total | 379 | 207 | 168 | 3 | 1 |
Source: National Election Commission
