= Park Heong-joon =

South Korean politician (born 1960)

The Honourable Park Heong-joon
- 박형준
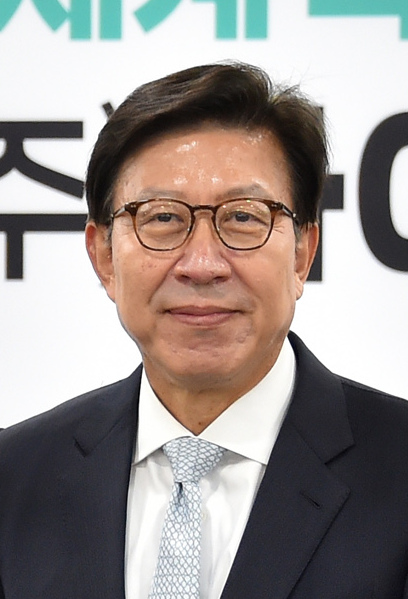

Mayor of Busan
- In office 8 April 2021 – 30 June 2026
- Preceded by: Oh Keo-don; Byeon Sung-wan (acting); Kim Sun-jo (acting); Lee Byung-jin (acting)
- Succeeded by: Chun Jae-soo

Secretary-General of the National Assembly
- In office 1 September 2014 – 20 June 2016
- Preceded by: Chung Jin-suk
- Succeeded by: Woo Yoon-keun

Senior Secretary to the President for Political Affairs
- In office 1 September 2009 – 16 July 2010
- President: Lee Myung-bak
- Preceded by: Maeng Hyung-kyu
- Succeeded by: Chung Jin-suk

Member of the National Assembly
- In office 30 May 2004 – 29 May 2008
- Preceded by: Yoo Heung-soo
- Succeeded by: Yoo Jae-jung
- Constituency: Suyeong (Busan)

Personal details
- Born: 19 January 1960 (age 66) East District, Busan, South Korea
- Party: People Power
- Other political affiliations: Popular (1990–1992); DLP (1994–1995); NKP (1995–1997); GNP (1997–2012); Saenuri (2012); Independent (2012–2020; 2020); UFP (2020)
- Spouse: Cho Hyun
- Children: 4 (including 2 with Cho)
- Education: Korea University (BA, MA, PhD)
- Occupation: Educator, journalist, politician

Korean name
- Hangul: 박형준
- Hanja: 朴亨埈
- RR: Bak Hyeongjun
- MR: Pak Hyŏngjun

Park Heong-joon (Korean: 박형준; born 19 January 1960) is a South Korean journalist, educator, and politician who served as the mayor of Busan from 2021 to 2026. A member of the People Power Party, he was a professor of the Sociology Department and Graduate School of International Studies at Dong-A University from 1991 to 2021.

Park represented the Grand National Party (GNP) in the National Assembly as the Member for Suyeong from 2004 until in 2008, when he was defeated by the Independent candidate Yoo Jae-jung, who later returned to the GNP. Though he lost again to Yoo in 2012, he served as the Secretary-General of the National Assembly from 2014 to 2016. He also served as the Senior Secretary to the President for Political Affairs from 2009 to 2010 under President Lee Myung-bak.

Park ran for Mayor of Busan in the 2021 by-election following the resignation of Oh Keo-don due to allegations of sexual harassment. He successfully defeated the Democratic candidate Kim Young-choon by a large margin. Park won reelection in 2022, defeating former Acting Mayor of Busan Byeon Sung-wan. In the 2026 South Korean local elections, he sought a third term, winning the nomination of the People Power Party but losing in the mayoral election to Democratic Party of Korea nominee Chun Jae-soo.

Prior to his political career, Park worked as a journalist of JoongAng Ilbo and Monthly Mal. Since the 2010s, he has been a commentator in various programmes such as Battle of Tongues, Powerful Opponents, Let's Be Politicians and so on.

== Early life and education ==
Park Heong-joon was born in Choryang-dong, East District, Busan, in 1960. His father was a doctor, whom he described as "an iron hand in a velvet glove". Little is known of his early family life, as he prefers to not talk about it.

Park was educated at Daeil High School and Korea University. While studying sociology at Korea University in 1980, he worked as an editor of the school magazine titled KU Culture (고대문화), along with joining anti-government protests. During a protest on 13 May, he ran away from the venue after he found the riot police firing tear gas, which later hit the wall of Plaza Hotel. One of the shrapnels injured his right eye and he was soon found collapsed on the road. Due to this, his legs were burnt, and his right eye was also injured which made him unable to see properly even after wearing spectacles; as a result he was later exempted from the national service. He then continued postgraduate studies and following the graduation, he was hired at JoongAng Ilbo in 1983 and worked for 2 years.

During the 1980s, Park was interested with left-wing ideologies such as Marxism. Along with studying those ideologies, he worked at left-leaning magazines, for example, Creation and Criticism and Reality and Science. In June 1991, he was briefly an editor of Monthly Mal, along with Jung Tae-in, who later joined the Justice Party and became a progressive economist.

== Political career ==
In the early 1990s, Park was a founding member of the Popular Party; others are Kim Moon-soo, Cha Myong-jin and Lee Jae-oh; all of them are now notable conservative figures. The party, however, won no seats in the 1992 election and was deregistered.

In 1993, Park was hired by Park Se-il, who was later appointed the Senior Secretary to the President for Policy Planning to the then President Kim Young-sam, to write and help the government's projects and policies. He completed The Plan and Strategy of Globalisation (세계화 구상과 전략) announced by the President Kim.

From 1995, he hosted important television debates in Busan. He was an emcee for the debate for the 1997 and the 2002 presidential elections. He also organised civic movements in Busan, such as establishing the New Thinking Forum, Cultural City — Busan Creation Network and Movement for Decentralisation of Busan.

Park joined the main opposition Grand National Party (GNP) instead of the de facto ruling Uri Party. Despite public criticism, he later revealed that the reason was to not just "rebuild" the GNP but also running under the GNP banner was more likely to win in right-leaning Busan. However, from what Sisa Journal reported was that he could not trust the leadership of the then President Roh Moo-hyun. He was nominated as the GNP candidate for Suyeong in the 2004 election and competed against the ruling candidate Huh Jin-ho. Though he came behind to Huh at early polls, he was elected to the National Assembly.

On 26 August 2006, while he was a member of the Culture and Tourism Committee of the National Assembly, several sources reported that Park, along with Kim Jae-hong, an MP of the Uri Party, had visited an arcade game exhibition held in Los Angeles, United States from 13 to 15 September 2005, using the money from game industry associations. Amid criticisms, he said that it was an official visit suggested by the committee. On 5 September, the Uri Party sued both Park and Kim to the Ethics Committee. On 13 December, he was summoned by the prosecution for receiving 100 million won (£63,000) from the CEO of Andamiro and a gift voucher association. However, he was cleared of wrongdoing on 23 February 2007.

During the 2007 presidential election, Park was one of the key figures helping the GNP presidential candidate Lee Myung-bak to be elected the country's president. Prior to the GNP presidential primary, he chose Lee instead of Park Geun-hye or Sohn Hak-kyu (quit the GNP before the primary) as he perceived that Lee is an "individualistic conservative" compared to Park who is a "nationalistic conservative". He also emphasised that South Korea needs a good Machiavellist, which could be acquired via Lee. Serving as the Spokesman to Lee, he accused the Blue House's of their decision to sue Lee. In the election on 19 December, Lee was officially elected the President of the Republic.

Despite his contributions, Park failed to get re-elected in the 2008 election. During the election, he contested against a pro-Park Geun-hye independent candidate Yoo Jae-jung. At first, he was widely expected to get re-elected. However, amid anti-campaigns from the Parksamo (a fan club to Park Geun-hye), he only received 27,940 votes (41.96%), compared to Yoo who had received 36,577 votes (54.93%). In this election, other pro-Lee Myung-bak figures such as Lee Jae-oh, Lee Bang-ho and Kim Hee-jung, also lost.

Following the election, Park was appointed the Chief Spokesperson of the Blue House on 23 June. On 31 August 2009, he became the Senior Secretary to the President for Political Affairs.

In the 2012 election, Park was set to contest under the banner of the then ruling Saenuri (successor of the GNP) banner. This time, he faced a challenge from Yoo, who had already returned to the GNP (then Saenuri) following his election in 2008, at the preselection. The party, however, suddenly changed the preselection methods, which was strongly objected by Park. Park subsequently left the party and contested as an independent candidate. He received 24,630 votes (29.59%) and was again defeated by Yoo.

== Post-political career ==
On 1 September 2014, Park was appointed the new Secretary-General of the National Assembly. On 4 December 2015, he announced he would not contest for Suyeong in the 2016 election. His term as the Secretary-General of the National Assembly ended on 21 June 2016.

Following the election lost in 2012, he has been involved in various programmes, such as Battle of Tongues, Powerful Opponents, Let's Be Politicians and so on. In 2017, he became the commentator of the conservative panel of the Battle of Tongues, replacing the incumbent Jun Won-tchack who became a newsreader of TV Chosun.

On 18 July 2017, at Battle of Tongues, Park harshly accused the main opposition Liberty Korea Party (LKP) for not learning from its past mistakes such as the 2016 political scandal. He also added that the party is only targeting far-right and elderly voters.

== Return to politics ==
On 9 January 2020, Park was appointed the Chairman of the Advance Committee for Innovation and Unity, an organisation seeking the unity of centrist and conservative parties including the then Liberty Korea Party (LKP) and the New Conservative Party (NCP). As a result, major conservative parties including both the LKP and the NCP was merged into the newly formed United Future Party (UFP).

On 9 March, prior to the 2020 election, Park applied to nominate himself as a candidate for the Future Korea Party (FKP), the satellite party to the UFP. He, however, retracted the decision within 2 hours following the public backlash of his decision. He later apologised for the issue.

In the general election, the UFP-FKP alliance only secured 103 out of 300 seats, the worst result as a major conservative party since 1988. The party president, Hwang Kyo-ahn, who contested for Jongno, was also defeated by the former Prime Minister Lee Nak-yon. Park cited that the party lost about 30 seats due to hate speeches and defamatory remarks of its several candidates. The party renamed itself to the People Power Party (PPP).

On 29 October, Park officially rejoined the PPP, the same day when the former President Lee Myung-bak was sentenced to 17 years in jail.

=== 2021 Busan mayoral election ===
The resignation of the Mayor of Busan Oh Keo-don on 23 April 2020 following the allegations of sexual harassment has provoked a by-election in 2021.

Prior to the election, Park was considered to be one of the potential candidates of the UFP (then PPP), along with an ex-MP Lee Un-ju, the former Mayor Suh Byung-soo, the former Dongnae Mayor Lee Jin-bok and so on. On 31 August, The Kookje Daily News had reported that Park was considering to run for the election.

On 15 December, Park officially launched his bid for Busan mayorship at Busan Port International Exhibition & Convention Centre. In his manifesto, he declared the following:

- Building the new airport (replacing the incumbent Gimhae International Airport) in Gadeokdo
- Developing the Port of Busan
- Artificial intelligence education for primary and secondary students

On 4 March 2021, Park won PPP preselection with obtaining 54.40%, defeating the former Deputy Mayor of Busan Park Seong-hun and the former MP for Gwangmyeong 2nd constituency Lee Un-ju.

From November 2020 to March 2020, various polls indicated that he had been the most favourable candidate. (Note: see the following:)

On 12 March 2021, Park posted on his Facebook that he had quit being a professor of Dong-a University where he had been working from 1 September 1991. He indicated that he would permanently quit as a scholar but become a full-time politician. Nevertheless, on 25 March, The Hankyoreh reported that his withdrawal from Dong-a University was shortly after he opened courses for a new semester. According to the newspaper, Park had opened 2 courses (1 for postgraduate and 1 other for doctorate) in February and the course selection period was from 15 to 25 February, while he was contesting PPP preselection for Busan mayorship. As the first class was on 4 March, the same day he was officially nominated as the candidate, the lecturer-in-charge for the doctorate course was immediately replaced to another person while the postgraduate course was abolished. This movement provoked a public uproar; one professor who used to work together with Park condemned that "the students' rights to learn were trampled". On the other hand, Park's election campaign revealed that Park had already resigned on 28 February, but there were some issues with the resignation letter, and could only be submitted on 2 March (accepted a week later). They also indicated that the postgraduate course was abolished due to the lack of students.

The exit poll released shortly after the election on 7 April showed that Park was expected to obtain 64.0%, while the Democratic candidate Kim Young-choon could only receive 33.0%. He expressed his gratitude to his supporters after he was confirmed to be elected. At 02:30 KST on 8 April, the ballot counting was finished, and Park received 961,576 votes (62.67%).

== Mayor of Busan ==
Park took the oath of office at 11:00 KST 8 April 2021 after he received a certificate of election from the Busan Election Commission. His first term ended on 30 June 2022 as he was elected in a by-election; he served the remaining term of Oh Keo-don. He was re-elected in the 8th local elections, and will serve his second term as mayor until 30 June 2026.

=== Inauguration ===
Park paid a visit to Chungnyeolsa at 8:30 KST 8 April, and then subsequently headed to the City Election Commission, where he received a certificate of election. His inauguration ceremony at the Busan Metropolitan City Hall proceeded with an online format due to social distancing in order to curb the COVID-19 pandemic.

== Political orientation ==
Formerly a left-wing Marxist, Park's political stance moved to centre-right. In 2007, he also declared himself as a "centre-right". During the administration of Lee Myung-bak, he set the government's stance as centrist pragmatism.

Nowadays, Park is critical towards left-wing ideology. He criticised South Korean leftists as "being too nationalistic in front of reunification issues". He also calls the Moon Jae-in government's policy to increase the minimum wage to 10,000 won (£6.7) as a "populist policy".

== Personal life ==
Park has been married to Cho Hyun, a businesswoman who has been operating Cho Hyun Gallery (World Gallery before 2008) since 1990. Her mother died in 2009. Both have a son and a daughter. On 17 March 2021, he revealed through his Facebook that Cho Hyun is his second wife. JoongAng Ilbo reported 2 days later that Cho had already been having a daughter and a son with her ex-husband and then remarried Park in December 1999.

== Works ==
=== Television ===
Year	Title	Network
2013–2019	Battle of Tongues	JTBC
2013	The Last Power	SBS
2014–2018	Issue Talk — We Will Tell You Issues	MBC
2019–2020	Let's Be Politicians	KBS
2019-	Powerful Opponents	TV Chosun

=== Books ===
- Modern Society and Ethics (1990)
- Modern Labour Process Theory (1991)
- Modern Society and Ideology (1992)
- Frontier of the 21st Century (1994)
- Digitisation — The Meaning in the History of Civilisation and the Way of National Strategy (1996)
- Understanding the 21st Century (1997)
- Reflective Civil Society and Citizens' Movement (2001)
- A Study on the Application of Regulatory Negotiations (2007)
- Korean Society — What and How to Change (2014)
- Reconstitution of Conservatism (2019)

== Election results ==
=== General elections ===
Year	Elections	Constituency	Political party	Votes (%)	Remarks
2004	17th Assembly General Election	Suyeong (Busan)	GNP	50,803 (58.80%)	Won
2008	18th National Assembly General Election	Suyeong (Busan)	GNP	27,940 (41.96%)	Defeated (2nd)
2012	19th National Assembly General Election	Suyeong (Busan)	Independent	24,630 (29.59%)	Defeated (2nd)

=== Local elections ===
==== Mayor of Busan ====
Year	Elections	Constituency	Political party	Votes (%)	Remarks
2021	2021 By-election	Busan (Mayoral Elections)	PPP	961,576 (62.67%)	Won
2022	8th Iocal Election	Busan (Mayoral Elections)	PPP	938,601 (66.36%)	Won
2026	9th Iocal Election	Busan (Mayoral Elections)	PPP	839,667 (47.90%)	Defeated (2nd)

== Notes ==
National Assembly of the Republic of Korea
Preceded by Yoo Heung-soo	Member of the National Assembly for Suyeong (Busan); 30 May 2004–29 May 2008	Succeeded by Yoo Jae-jung
Political offices
Preceded by Oh Keo-don; Byeon Sung-wan (Acting); Kim Sun-jo (Acting); Lee Byung-jin (Acting)	Mayor of Busan; 8 April 2021–30 June 2026	Succeeded by Chun Jae-soo
Preceded by Maeng Hyung-kyu	Senior Secretary to the President for Political Affairs; 1 September 2009–16 July 2010	Succeeded by Chung Jin-suk
Preceded by Chung Jin-suk	Secretary-General of the National Assembly; 1 September 2014–20 June 2016	Succeeded by Woo Yoon-keun
