= Moon Seong-hyeok =

South Korean politician

- 문성혁
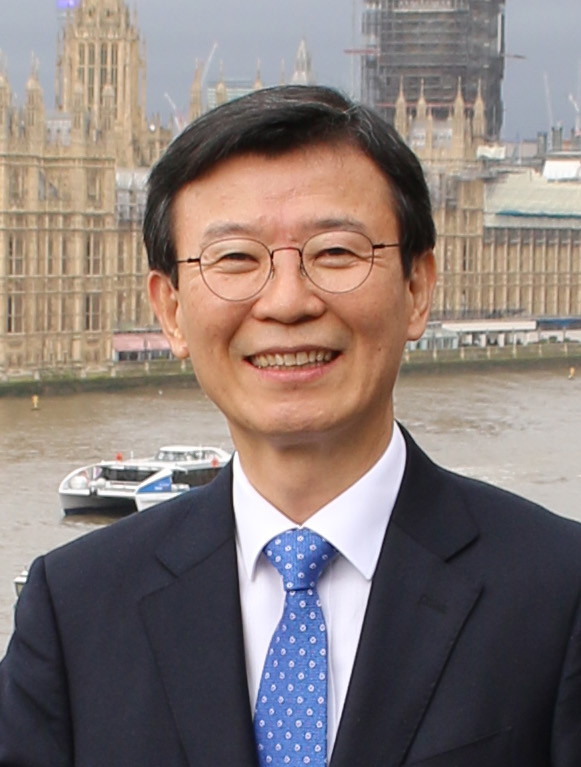
- Moon Seong-hyeok in 2019

Minister of Oceans and Fisheries
- In office 3 April 2019 – 9 May 2022
- President: Moon Jae-in
- Prime Minister: Lee Nak-yeon; Chung Sye-kyun; Kim Boo-kyum
- Preceded by: Kim Young-choon
- Succeeded by: Cho Seung-hwan

Personal details
- Born: 1958 (age 67–68) Busan, South Korea
- Party: Independent
- Education: Korea Maritime and Ocean University; Cardiff University

- Moon Seong-hyeok
- Hangul: 문성혁
- Hanja: 文成赫
- RR: Mun Seonghyeok
- MR: Mun Sŏnghyŏk

Moon Seong-hyeok (Korean: 문성혁; also known as Daniel Seong-hyeok Moon; born 1958) is a South Korean professor at World Maritime University served as the Minister of Oceans and Fisheries under President Moon Jae-in from 2019 to 2022.

Before appointed as minister, Moon served at WMU for over 11 years from 2008 as the INMARSAT Professorial Chair, Associate Academic Dean, and Head of Port Management specialization. He previously worked at Korea Maritime and Ocean University from 1984 to 2013 as its professor, project manager and senior leadership member. Before joining academia, he worked as a first officer at now HMM.

He holds three degrees - a bachelor in navigation science and master's in port transport from Korea Maritime and Ocean University and a doctorate in port economics from Cardiff University.
