= Battle of Tongues =

- Promotional poster
- Genre: Talk show
- Starring: Kim Gura, Park Hyung-joon, Rhee Cheolhee
- Country of origin: South Korea
- Original language: Korean
- No. of episodes: 307

Production
- Production location: South Korea
- Running time: 70 minutes

Original release
- Network: JTBC
- Release: 21 February 2013 – 17 March 2019

Battle of Tongues (Korean: 썰전) is a 2013 South Korean television program starring Kim Gura, Rhyu Si-min. It aired on JTBC on Thursdays at 22:50 beginning 21 February 2013.

== Host ==
- Kim Gura
- Park Hyung-joon
- Rhee Cheolhee

Former

- Lee Yoon-Seok
- Park Ji-yoon
- Choi Hee
- Roh Hoe-chan
- Hong Seok-cheon
- Kim Hee-chul
- Heo Ji-woong
- Kang Yong-suk
- Lee Jun-seok
- Seo Jang-hoon
- Jang Do-Youn
- Choi Jingi
- Jun Won-tchack
- Rhyu Si-min

== Awards and nominations ==
Year	Award	Category	Recipients	Result
2016	53rd Baeksang Arts Awards	Best Educational Program	Battle of Tongues	Won
