= Hur Nam-sik =

South Korean politician (born 1949)

Hur Nam-sik 허남식 許南植

Mayor of Busan
- In office June 6, 2004 – June 30, 2014
- Preceded by: Ahn Sang-yeong
- Succeeded by: Suh Byung-soo

Personal details
- Born: 14 March 1949 (age 77) Uiryeong, South Gyeongsang Province, South Korea
- Party: People Power
- Spouse: Lee Mi-ja
- Education: Korea University, Seoul National University, Kyungsung University, Bukyung University, Donga University, Pusan National University

- Hur Nam-sik
- Hangul: 허남식
- Hanja: 許南植
- RR: Heo Namsik
- MR: Hŏ Namsik

Hur Nam-sik (Korean: 허남식; born March 14, 1949) is a South Korean politician who served as the mayor of Busan from 2004 to 2014. He was born in Uiryeong, South Gyeongsang Province, South Korea.

== Careers ==
- The 19th Higher Civil Service Examination (1976)
- Director of Transportation Planning, Busan
- Director of Personnel Management, Busan
- Planning Director of Busan (1994)
- Mayor of Yeongdo District, Busan
- Director-General of Preparatory Bureau for the Asian Games, Busan
- Director-General of Home Affairs, Busan
- Director of Waterworks, Busan (1995)
- Chief of Busan Metropolitan Council Bureau
- Director of Planning and Management, Busan (November 2000 – January 2003)
- Deputy Mayor for Political Affairs of Busan (2003)
- Mayor of Busan (June 2004 – June 2014)
- President of Governors Association of Korea (October 2008)

== Election results ==
=== Local elections ===
==== Mayor of Busan ====
| Year | Elections | Constituency | Political party | Votes (%) | Results |
|---|---|---|---|---|---|
| 2004 | 2004 By-election | Busan (Mayoral Elections) | GNP | 556,700 (62.29%) | Won |
| 2006 | 4th Iocal Election | Busan (Mayoral Elections) | GNP | 895,214 (65.24%) | Won |
| 2010 | 5th Iocal Election | Busan (Mayoral Elections) | GNP | 770,507 (55.42%) | Won |
