= Mayor of Busan =

Local government official in South Korea

- 부산광역시장
- Seal of Busan

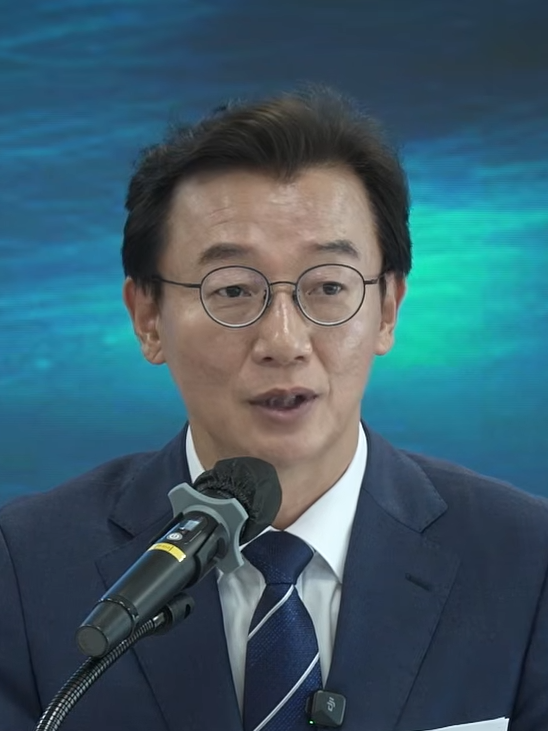
- Incumbent; Chun Jae-soo since 1 July 2026
- Term length: Four years
- Inaugural holder: Yang Seong-bong
- Formation: 24 January 1946; 80 years ago

The mayor of Busan (Korean: 부산광역시장; Hanja: 釜山廣域市長) is the head of the local government of Busan who is elected to a four-year term.

== List of mayors ==
=== Appointed mayors (before 1995) ===
From 1946 to 1995, the Mayor of Busan was appointed by the President of the Republic of Korea.

=== Directly elected mayors (1995–present) ===
Since 1995, under provisions of the revised Local Government Act, the Mayor of Busan is elected by direct election.

Political parties
Conservative
Liberal
Independent
Status
Denotes acting mayor

Term	Portrait	Name (Birth–Death)	Term of office			Political party	Elected
Term	Portrait	Name (Birth–Death)	Took office	Left office	Time in office	Political party	Elected
1st		Moon Jung-soo 문정수 文正秀 (born 1939)	1 July 1995	30 June 1998	3 years, 0 days	Democratic Liberal → New Korea → Grand National	1995
2nd		Ahn Sang-yeong 안상영 安相英 (1938–2004)	1 July 1998	24 October 2003	5 years, 116 days	Grand National	1998
3rd		Ahn Sang-yeong 안상영 安相英 (1938–2004)	1 July 1998	24 October 2003	5 years, 116 days	Grand National	2002
3rd		Oh Keo-don 오거돈 吳巨敦 (born 1948); Acting	25 October 2003	13 May 2004	202 days	Independent	—
3rd		Ahn Joon-tae 안준태 安準泰 (born 1952); Acting	14 May 2004	5 June 2004	23 days	Independent	—
3rd		Hur Nam-sik 허남식 許南植 (born 1949)	6 June 2004	30 June 2014	10 years, 25 days	Grand National → Saenuri	2004 (by-el.)
4th		Hur Nam-sik 허남식 許南植 (born 1949)	6 June 2004	30 June 2014	10 years, 25 days	Grand National → Saenuri	2006
5th		Hur Nam-sik 허남식 許南植 (born 1949)	6 June 2004	30 June 2014	10 years, 25 days	Grand National → Saenuri	2010
6th		Suh Byung-soo 서병수 徐秉洙 (born 1952)	1 July 2014	30 June 2018	4 years, 0 days	Saenuri → Liberty Korea	2014
7th		Oh Keo-don 오거돈 吳巨敦 (born 1948)	1 July 2018	23 April 2020	1 year, 298 days	Democratic	2018
7th		Byeon Sung-wan 변성완 邊城完 (born 1965); Acting	23 April 2020	26 January 2021	279 days	Independent	—
7th		Kim Sun-jo 김선조 金善照 (born 1967); Acting	26 January 2021	28 January 2021	3 days	Independent	—
7th		Lee Byeong-jin 이병진 李炳振 (born 1964); Acting	29 January 2021	7 April 2021	69 days	Independent	—
7th		Park Heong-joon 박형준 朴亨埈 (born 1960)	8 April 2021	30 June 2026	5 years, 84 days	People Power	2021 (by-el.)
8th		Park Heong-joon 박형준 朴亨埈 (born 1960)	8 April 2021	30 June 2026	5 years, 84 days	People Power	2022
9th		Chun Jae-soo 전재수 (born 1971)	1 July 2026	Incumbent	98 days	Democratic	2026

== Elections ==
=== 1995 ===
1995 Busan mayoral election
Party	#	Candidate	Votes	Percentage
Democratic Liberal	1	Moon Jung-soo	885,433	51.40%
Democratic	2	Roh Moo-hyun	647,297	37.58%
Independent	3	Kim Hyun-ok	169,652	9.84%
Independent	4	Bae Sang-han	20,008	1.16%
Total			1,722,390	100.00%
Voter turnout			66.23%	

=== 1998 ===
1998 Busan mayoral election
Party	#	Candidate	Votes	Percentage
Grand National	1	Ahn Sang-yeong	558,909	45.14%
Independent	4	Kim Ki-jae	537,983	43.45%
National Congress	2	Ha Il-min	141,172	11.40%
Total			1,238,064	100.00%
Voter turnout			46.66%	

=== 2002 ===
2002 Busan mayoral election
Party	#	Candidate	Votes	Percentage
Grand National	1	Ahn Sang-yeong	729,589	63.76%
Millennium Democratic	2	Han Ih-heon	221,938	19.39%
Democratic Labor	3	Kim Seok-joon	192,594	16.83%
Total			1,144,121	100.00%
Voter turnout			41.77%	

=== 2004 (by-election) ===
2004 Busan mayoral by-election
Party	#	Candidate	Votes	Percentage
Grand National	2	Hur Nam-sik	566,700	62.29%
Uri	1	Oh Keo-don	343,110	37.71%
Total			909,810	100.00%
Voter turnout			32.98%	

=== 2006 ===
2006 Busan mayoral election
Party	#	Candidate	Votes	Percentage
Grand National	2	Hur Nam-sik	895,214	65.54%
Uri	1	Oh Keo-don	329,470	24.12%
Democratic Labor	4	Kim Seok-joon	141,061	10.32%
Total			1,365,745	100.00%
Voter turnout			48.46%	

=== 2010 ===
2010 Busan mayoral election
Party	#	Candidate	Votes	Percentage
Grand National	1	Hur Nam-sik	770,507	55.42%
Democratic	2	Kim Jeong-gil	619,565	44.57%
Total			1,390,072	100.00%
Voter turnout			49.48%	

=== 2014 ===
2014 Busan mayoral election
Party	#	Candidate	Votes	Percentage
Saenuri	1	Suh Byung-soo	797,926	50.65%
Independent	4	Oh Keo-don	777,225	49.34%
Total			1,575,151	100.00%
Voter turnout			55.56%	

=== 2018 ===
2018 Busan mayoral election
Party	#	Candidate	Votes	Percentage
Democratic	1	Oh Keo-don	940,469	55.23%
Liberty Korea	2	Suh Byung-soo	632,806	37.16%
Bareunmirae	3	Lee Sung-guen	67,502	3.96%
Justice	5	Park Joo-mi	35,299	2.07%
Independent	6	Lee Jong-hyuk	26,720	1.56%
Total			1,702,796	100.00%
Voter turnout			58.78%	

=== 2021 (by-election) ===
2021 Busan mayoral by-election
Party	#	Candidate	Votes	Percentage
People Power	2	Park Heong-joon	961,576	62.67%
Democratic	1	Kim Young-choon	528,135	34.42%
Freedom and Democracy	8	Jeong Kyu-jae	16,380	1.06%
Progressive	9	Roh Jeong-hyeon	13,054	0.85%
Mirae	6	Son Sang-woo	7,933	0.51%
Minsaeng	7	Bae Jun-hyeon	7,251	0.47%
Total			1,534,329	100.00%
Voter turnout			52.65%	

=== 2022 ===
2022 Busan mayoral election
Party	#	Candidate	Votes	Percentage
People Power	2	Park Heong-joon	938,601	66.36%
Democratic	1	Byeon Sung-wan	455,901	32.23%
Justice	3	Kim Young-jin	19,733	1.39%
Total			1,414,235	100.00%
Voter turnout			49.10%	

=== 2026 ===
Candidate	Party	Votes	%
Chun Jae-soo	Democratic Party	885,608	50.53
Park Heong-joon (incumbent)	People Power Party	839,667	47.91
Jeong Ihan	Reform Party	27,418	1.56
Total		1,752,693	100.00
Valid votes		1,752,693	98.71
Invalid/blank votes		22,981	1.29
Total votes		1,775,674	100.00
Registered voters/turnout		2,857,335	62.14
Democratic gain from People Power			

== See also ==
- Government of South Korea
- Politics of South Korea
