= Suh Byung-soo =

South Korean politician

The Honourable Suh Byung-soo MP
- 서병수
- Suh Byung-soo in 2017

Mayor of Busan
- In office 1 July 2014 – 30 June 2018
- Preceded by: Hur Nam-sik
- Succeeded by: Oh Keo-don

Secretary-General of the Saenuri Party
- In office 21 May 2012 – 13 May 2013
- President: Hwang Woo-yea
- Preceded by: Kwon Young-se
- Succeeded by: Hong Moon-jong

Mayor of Haeundae
- In office 26 January 2000 – 8 February 2002
- Preceded by: Shin Joong-bock
- Succeeded by: Chung Young-seok (acting); Huh Ok-kyung

Member of the National Assembly
- In office 30 May 2020 – 29 May 2024
- Preceded by: Kim Young-choon
- Succeeded by: Jung Sung-kook
- Constituency: Busanjin A (Busan)
- In office 9 August 2002 – 15 May 2014
- Preceded by: Sohn Tae-in
- Succeeded by: Bae Deok-kwang
- Constituency: Haeundae-Gijang A (Busan)

Personal details
- Born: 9 January 1952 (age 74) Daun, Ulsan, South Korea
- Party: Independent
- Other political affiliations: NKP (1996–1997); GNP (1997–2012); Saenuri (2012–2017); LKP (2017–2020); UFP (2020); PPP (2020-2026)
- Spouse: Kwon Soon-jin
- Children: 2
- Education: Sogang University; Northern Illinois University

Suh Byung-soo (Korean: 서병수; born 9 January 1952) is a South Korean politician who served as the mayor of Busan from 2014 to 2018. He previously served as the Member of the National Assembly for Haeundae-Gijang A constituency from 2002 to 2014 and the as the mayor of Haeundae from 2000 to 2002.

A member of the conservative People Power Party, Suh was elected the Mayor of Busan on 4 June 2014, defeating the independent candidate Oh Keo-don. In 2018, he ran for re-election but lost to Oh, who ran under the Democratic banner.

== Early life ==
Suh Byung-soo was born in 1952, in the town of Daun, Ulsan, South Gyeongsang (now Daun-dong, Central District, Ulsan), to the son of Suh Seok-in (died in 2020), the founder of Woojin Service who had served as the Member of the Busan Metropolican Council from 1991 to 1995 and the Mayor of Haeundae from 1995 to 1998. His mom died in February 1997. He is the eldest among 4 sons and a daughter to the ex-Haeundae Mayor; he is the brother to Suh Ha-soo, Suh Hyun-soo and Suh Bum-soo. Although he was born in Ulsan, he grew up in Yeongdo, Busan.

He went to 3 different schools — Yeongdo Primary School, Busan Secondary School and Kyungnam High School. He later attended Sogang University and received a bachelor's and a master's degree in economics. Then, he fled to the United States and received a doctorate in economics from Northern Illinois University in 1987. Following the graduation, he briefly worked at Ford Motor Company before he returned to South Korea and continued his career at Korea Institute of Machinery and Materials and Presidential Advisory Council on Science and Technology. In 1990s, he was the CEO of Woojin Service, succeeding his father who had resigned in order to run for the 1991 local elections. He served till the end of 1997, however, in 2000, some sources reported that he was still serving the position at that time. This time, he was also an adjunct professor at Dong-Pusan College.

== Political career ==
In the 2000 by-elections, Suh ran as the Grand National Party (GNP)'s nominee for the Mayor of Haeundae and was elected, defeating 2 independent candidates (the then-ruling Millennium Democratic Party aka MDP did not put a candidate). He succeeded the predecessor Shin Joong-bock, whose election was annulled for violating the election law in 1999. He promised to attract both foreign and private capitals and make the district as a logistic hub for information and tourism. Under his mayorship, he had successfully fixed hawker stalls at Hoan Road and built Moontan Road.

He resigned on 7 February 2002 in order to run for the MP for Haeundae-Gijang 1st constituency at the by-election called due to the death of Sohn Tae-in. He won with 27,961 votes, defeating the MDP candidate Choi In-ho. In the 2004 election, he again contested with Choi In-ho who ran under the Uri Party banner in this time. Despite coming behind in exit polls, he successfully beat his rival. Shortly after the re-election in 2008, he served as the Chairman of the Strategy and Finance Committee, for this time, he suggested an amendment of the Tax Law and Bank of Korea Act, including tax reduction. In 2010, he was elected as a Vice President of the GNP.

In the 2012 election, Suh contested under the Saenuri banner and defeated the DFP-UFP unity candidate, Goh Chang-kwon, with a majority of 18,705 votes. He was a potential candidate for the Saenuri parliamentary leader, but some media suggested he could be "nominated" the position under the interim President Park Geun-hye. Known as the "Nominee List", on 25 April, he finally declared to not seek for the position. On 21 May, under the new President Hwang Woo-yea, he was appointed the party's Secretary-General. As the Secretary-General, he contributed its presidential candidate Park Geun-hye to be elected to the position in December.

== Mayor of Busan ==
=== 2014 mayoral election ===
On 26 February 2014, Suh officially launched his bid for Busan mayorship at Daehang Saebaji Harbour, Gadeokdo. Following are the manifestos included in his declaration:

- Building the new airport (replacing the incumbent Gimhae International Airport) in Gadeokdo
- Developing West Busan as a rich riverside city with future high-tech industries and cultural infrastructures
- Creating 200,000 of new jobs, including 50,000 of stable jobs
- Redeveloping:
  - industrial complexes in North, Sasang and Saha District
  - North Port
  - 55 Supply Depot and railway sites

He contested with the former Sasang MP and the ex-ambassador to Japan Kwon Chul-hyun and the then North-Gangseo MP Park Min-shik at the Saenuri preselection. On 3 April, he relinquished his parliamentary membership in order to focus on his campaign. On 30 April, he gained 36.9% and defeated 2 ex-MPs.

Though he led at the beginning, he was expected to lose after the NPAD candidate Kim Young-choon abandoned his campaign and endorsed the independent candidate Oh Keo-don, the former Minister of Oceans and Fisheries who had ever been run for 2 times before. On 4 June, he narrowly beat the former Oceans and Fisheries Minister by a margin of approximately 2%.

=== Mayoralty ===
Suh was sworn into office on 1 July 2014, approximately a month after the election. He promised "Citizens First" policies and the "Nakdong River Era". Prior to the inauguration, he put a slogan "Happy Citizens, Healthy Busan".

Since before the election, he pledged to build the new airport (replacing the incumbent Gimhae International Airport) in Gadeokdo and to resign should the manifesto would not be fulfilled. On 21 June 2016, the Government of Park Geun-hye had brought a decision in which they would expand the incumbent Gimhae Airport, instead of replacing it in either Gadeokdo or Miryang, recommended by the ADP Ingénierie. The Government's determination was criticised as "breaking a promise" from the opposition parties, including the Democratic Party and the People's Party, despite the reactions from the Blue House. There were earlier prognoses that Suh would stand down for taking responsibilities; in fact, a day before the governmental determination, he ensured "no alternatives except at Gadeokdo". On 27 June, however, he confirmed he would accept the Government's decision and would not step down as Mayor.

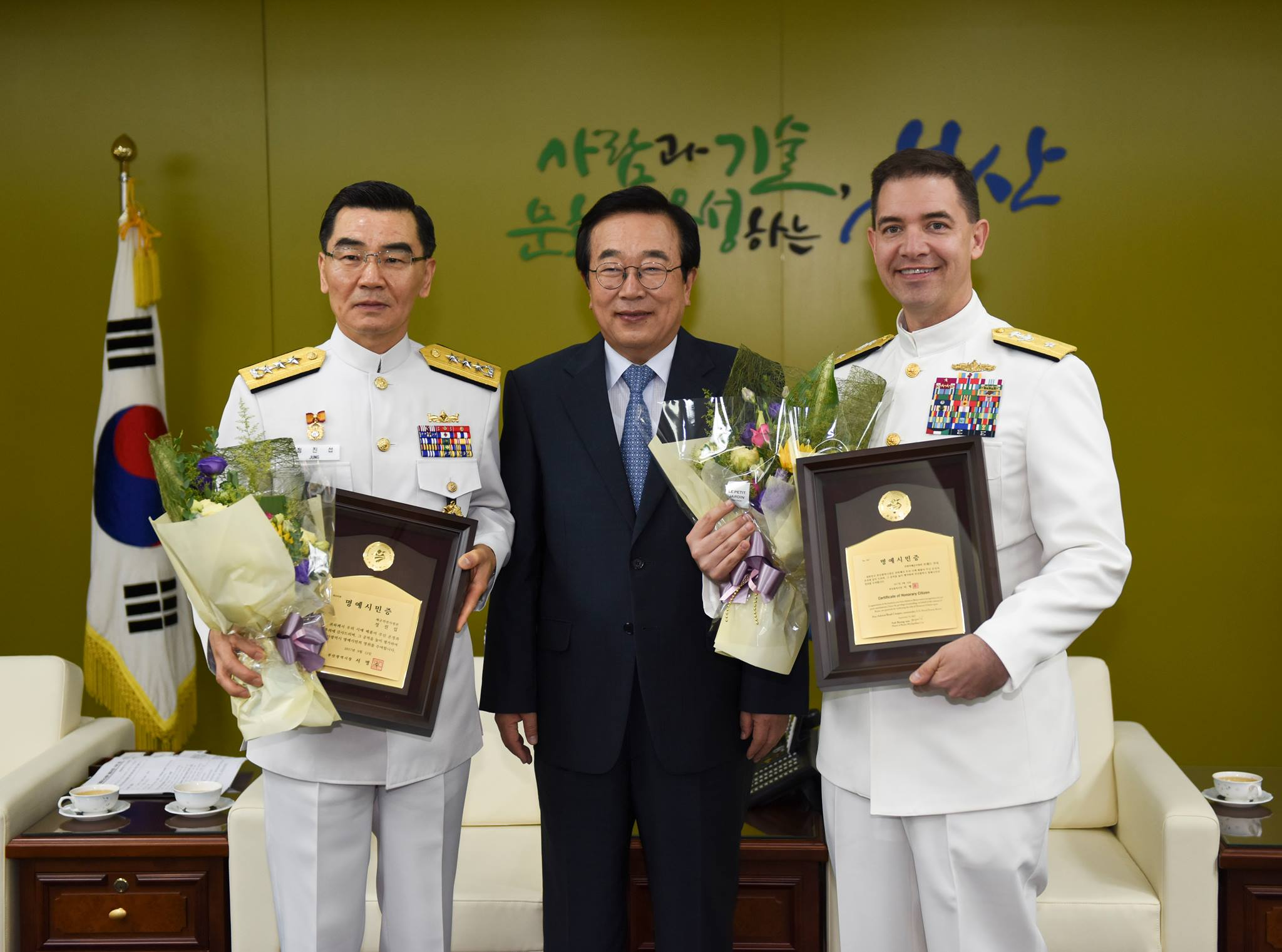
Suh Byung-soo with Jung Jin-sup

On 16 August 2017, Lotte Corporation had donated 100 billion won (≒ 100 million US$) to Busan for the Opera House development at North Port. Suh emphasised that the Opera House would not just be a cultural complex for citizens, but also become a tourist attraction and a new workplaces. The construction was begun on 22 May 2018.

On 21 September, the Busan City Government announced perhaps they would purchase 100 billion won to build a landmark, which is the Statue of Liberty, as a part of the North Harbour Redevelopment. The location was not confirmed yet, but probably nearby Shinseondae Quay, Yongdang-dong, South District. According to the plan, the construction would begin in 2020 and be completed by 2022. There were criticisms that whether the city is possible to proceed with the project despite having too many debts. The City Government reacted they have not made any decisions yet.

=== 2018 mayoral election ===
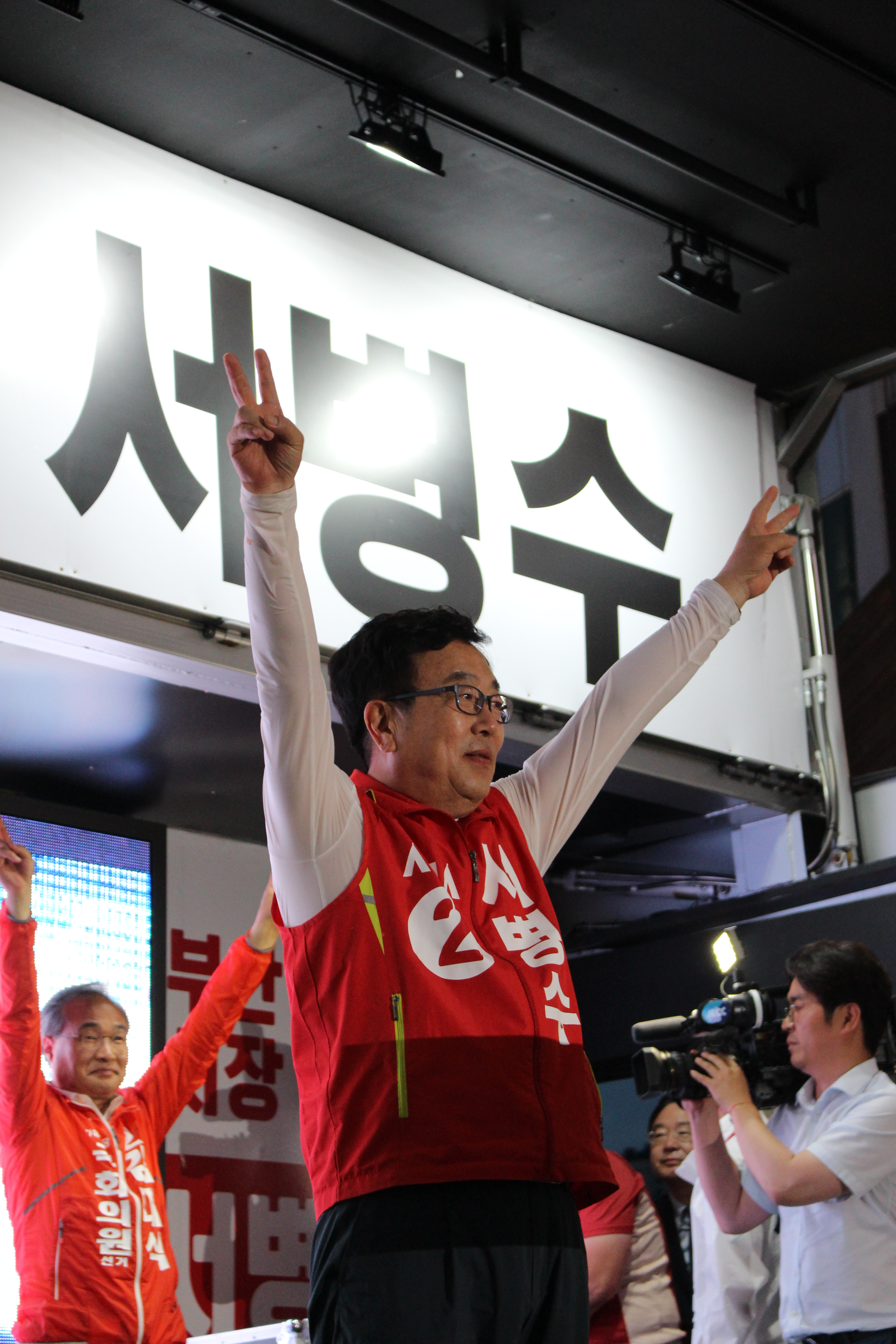
Suh Byung-soo campaigning at Gwangbok Street, Central District in June 2018

Prior to the 2018 local elections, the Liberty Korea Party (LKP) was agonising over preselection for Busan mayorship. On 16 March 2018, the LKP confirmed the party had nominated Suh as its candidate, instead of holding a preselection. Lee Jong-hyuk, one of potential rival close to the party president Hong Jun-pyo, announced his departure from the party due to his objection towards the decision. Lee, then, launched his bid to run as an independent candidate.

On 3 April, the Democratic Party confirmed they would nominate Oh Keo-don, who had unsuccessfully stood 4 years ago, as its candidate. Therefore, Suh faced the 2nd competition with Oh.

However, according to the opinion polls of Realmeter on 5 May, Suh came far behind Oh (Oh: 57.7%, Suh: 27.1%). As of June, he failed to narrow the interval between the Democratic candidate. On 13 June, he only received 37.16% and was finally defeated to Oh. The LKP also lost many of its district mayors and metropolitan council members to the Democratic Party.

== Post-mayorship ==
On 5 March 2020, Suh was selected the MP candidate for Busanjin 1st constituency at the 2020 election. Many polls showed neck and neck with the Democratic candidate Kim Young-choon, but Suh successfully defeated Kim.

Shortly after his comeback to the National Assembly, Oh Keo-don resigned as the Mayor of Busan on 23 April following the allegations of sexual harassment has provoked the by-election in 2021. As the incident provoked a by-election in 2021, Suh became one of the potential candidate to the position, and he also indicated that he was considering to run. Nevertheless, on 21 December, he announced not to contest the election. Several sources reported that he was backing the former Deputy Mayor Park Seong-hun at the PPP preselection, and on 23 February 2021, he left some positive comments about the former Deputy Mayor.

On the other hand, Park Seong-hun lost to the former MP for Suyeong Park Hyung-joon, whom Suh criticised as "incapable" to the position, at the PPP preselection on 4 March.

== Election results ==
=== General elections ===
Year	Elections	Constituency	Political party	Votes (%)	Remarks
2002	2002 By-election	Haeundae–Gijang A (Busan)	GNP	27,961 (69.60%)	Won
2004	17th National Assembly General Election	Haeundae–Gijang A (Busan)	GNP	71,913 (55.55%)	Won
2008	18th National Assembly General Election	Haeundae–Gijang A (Busan)	GNP	57,968 (64.98%)	Won
2012	19th National Assembly General Election	Haeundae–Gijang A (Busan)	Saenuri	68,136 (55.52%)	Won
2020	21st National Assembly General Election	Busanjin A (Busan)	UFP	52,037 (48.52%)	Won
2024	22nd National Assembly General Election	Buk A (Busan)	PPP	38,850 (46.67%)	Defeated (2nd)

=== Local elections ===
==== Mayor of Busan Haeundae ====
Year	Elections	Constituency	Political party	Votes (%)	Remarks
2000	January 2000 By-election	Mayor of Busan Haeundae	GNP	15,793 (55.70%)	Won

==== Mayor of Busan ====
Year	Elections	Constituency	Political party	Votes (%)	Remarks
2014	6th Iocal Election	Busan (Mayoral Elections)	Saenuri	797,926 (50.65%)	Won
2018	7th Iocal Election	Busan (Mayoral Elections)	LKP	632,806 (37.16%)	Defeated (2nd)
