= 2006 South Korean local elections =

- 31 May 2006

16 regional heads 733 regional councilors 230 municipal mayors 2,888 municipal councilors
- Registered: 37,064,282
- Turnout: 19,118,177; 51.6% (▲2.7pp)
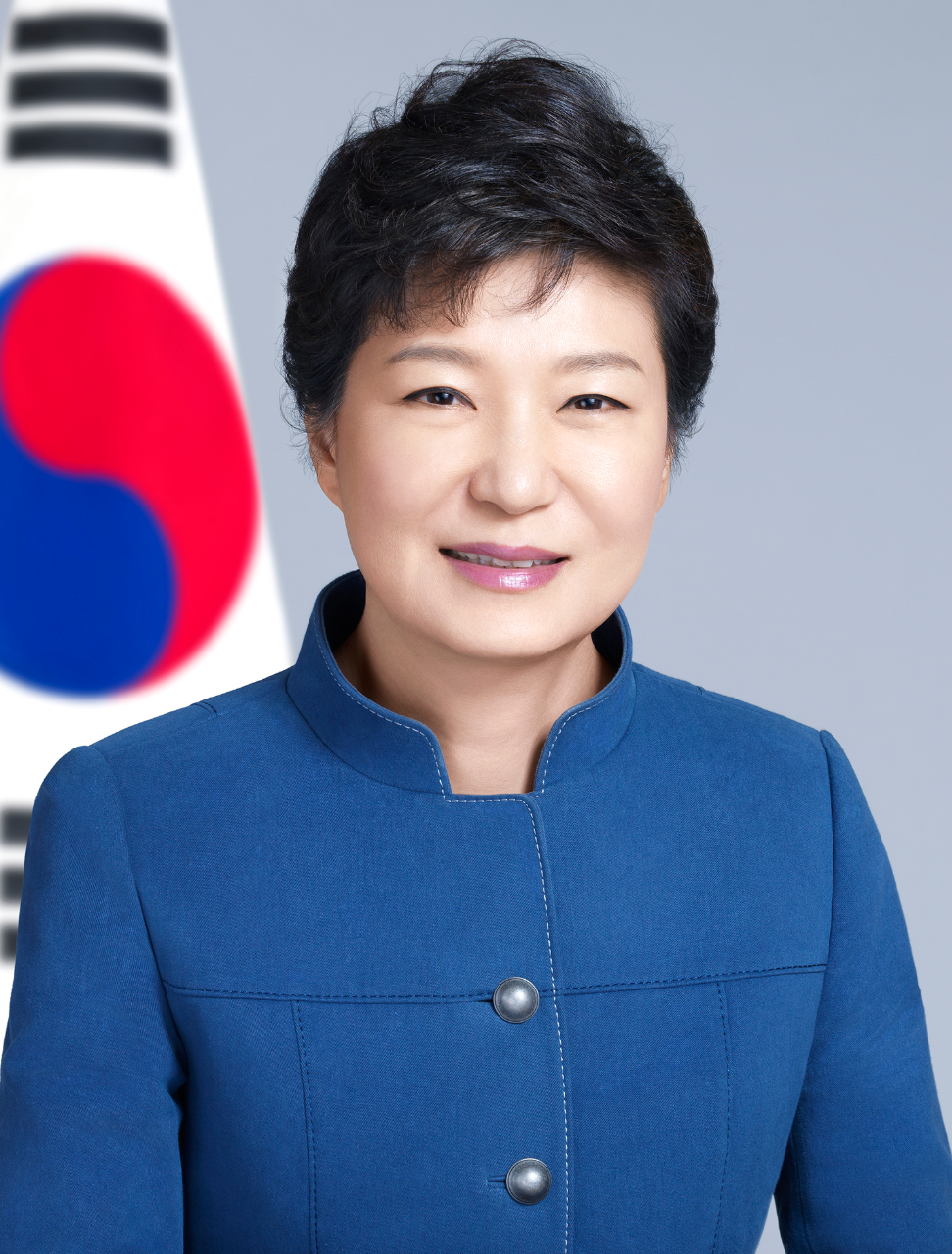

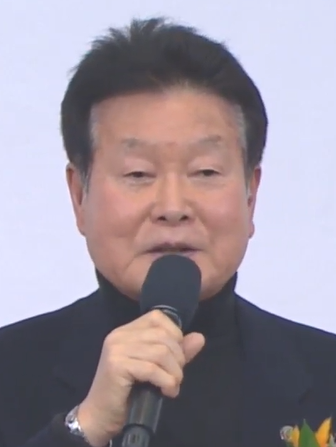

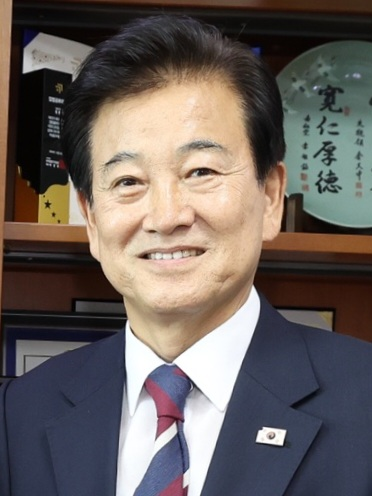
	First party	Second party	Third party
Leader	Park Geun-hye	Han Hwa-gap	Chung Dong-young
Party	Grand National	Democratic	Uri
Regional seats last election	11 heads 467 councilors	4 heads 143 councilors	Did not exist
Municipal seats last election	140 mayors	44 mayors	Did not exist
Regional seats won	12 heads 557 councilors	2 heads 80 councilors	1 head 52 councilors
Regional seat change	▲1 head ▲90 councilors	▼3 heads ▼63 councilors	New
Municipal seats won	155 mayors 1,621 councilors	20 mayors 276 councilors	19 mayors 630 councilors
Municipal seat change	▲15 mayors	▼24 mayors	New

- Municipal mayors ■ Grand National Party ■ Democratic Party ■ Yeollin Uri Party ■ People First Party ■ Independent

The 4th Local Elections were held in South Korea on 31 May 2006. It was the first local elections in South Korea to have political parties nominating candidates for Municipal Councillors. The ruling Uri Party proved its declining popularity since the 2004 general elections while the main opposition party, Grand National Party managed to clinch back lost grounds, using the opportunity for the presidential election the following year.

== Regional head elections ==
Party	Votes	%	Seats	+/–
Grand National Party	10,418,021	55.25	12	+1
Uri Party	5,106,984	27.08	1	New
Democratic Party	1,709,452	9.07	2	–3
Democratic Labor Party	1,099,592	5.83	0	0
People First Party	345,295	1.83	0	New
Hanmijun	7,188	0.04	0	New
Citizens' Party	4,790	0.03	0	New
Independents	166,284	0.88	1	+1
Total	18,857,606	100.00	16	0
Valid votes	18,857,606	98.64		
Invalid/blank votes	260,571	1.36		
Total votes	19,118,177	100.00		
Registered voters/turnout	37,064,282	51.58		
Source: National Election Commission

=== Summary ===
Province/City	Head	Incumbent	Party	Elected	Party
Seoul	Mayor	Lee Myung-bak	Grand National	Oh Se-hoon	Grand National
Busan	Mayor	Hur Nam-sik	Grand National	Hur Nam-sik	Grand National
Daegu	Mayor	Cho Hae-nyung	Grand National	Kim Bum-il	Grand National
Incheon	Mayor	Ahn Sang-soo	Grand National	Ahn Sang-soo	Grand National
Gwangju	Mayor	Park Gwang-tae	Democratic	Park Gwang-tae	Democratic
Daejeon	Mayor	Yeom Hong-cheol	Uri	Park Sung-hyo	Grand National
Ulsan	Mayor	Park Maeng-woo	Grand National	Park Maeng-woo	Grand National
Gyeonggi	Governor	Sohn Hak-kyu	Grand National	Kim Moon-soo	Grand National
Gangwon	Governor	Kim Jin-sun	Grand National	Kim Jin-sun	Grand National
North Chungcheong	Governor	Lee Won-jong	Grand National	Chung Woo-taik	Grand National
South Chungcheong	Governor	Yoo Deok-joon (acting)	Independent	Lee Wan-koo	Grand National
North Jeolla	Governor	Kang Hyun-wook	Millennium Democratic	Kim Wan-ju	Uri
South Jeolla	Governor	Park Jun-young	Democratic	Park Jun-young	Democratic
North Gyeongsang	Governor	Lee Eui-geun	Grand National	Kim Kwan-yong	Grand National
South Gyeongsang	Governor	Kim Chae-yong (acting)	Independent	Kim Tae-ho	Grand National
Jeju	Governor	Kim Han-wook (acting)	Independent	Kim Tae-hwan	Independent

=== Seoul ===
Candidate	Party	Votes	%
Oh Se-hoon	Grand National Party	2,409,760	61.06
Kang Kum-sil	Uri Party	1,077,890	27.31
Park Joo-sun	Democratic Party	304,565	7.72
Kim Jong-chul	Democratic Labor Party	117,421	2.98
Lim Woong-kyun	People First Party	14,111	0.36
Baek Seung-won	Independent	13,808	0.35
Lee Gwi-sun	Citizens' Party	4,790	0.12
Lee Tae-hee	Hanmijun	4,481	0.11
Total		3,946,826	100.00
Valid votes		3,946,826	99.22
Invalid/blank votes		31,016	0.78
Total votes		3,977,842	100.00
Registered voters/turnout		7,983,648	49.82
Grand National hold			
Source: National Election Commission

=== Busan ===
Candidate	Party	Votes	%
Hur Nam-sik (incumbent)	Grand National Party	895,214	65.55
Oh Keo-don	Uri Party	329,470	24.12
Kim Seok-joon	Democratic Labor	141,061	10.33
Total		1,365,745	100.00
Valid votes		1,365,745	99.07
Invalid/blank votes		12,873	0.93
Total votes		1,378,618	100.00
Registered voters/turnout		2,845,104	48.46
Grand National hold			
Source: National Election Commission

=== Daegu ===
Candidate	Party	Votes	%
Kim Bum-il	Grand National Party	636,057	70.15
Lee Jae-yong	Uri Party	191,131	21.08
Lee Youn-jae	Democratic Labor Party	35,497	3.92
Paik Seung-hong	Independent	35,232	3.89
Park Seung-gook	People First Party	8,764	0.97
Total		906,681	100.00
Valid votes		906,681	99.08
Invalid/blank votes		8,379	0.92
Total votes		915,060	100.00
Registered voters/turnout		1,885,043	48.54
Grand National hold			
Source: National Election Commission

=== Incheon ===
Candidate	Party	Votes	%
Ahn Sang-soo (incumbent)	Grand National Party	526,932	61.93
Choi Ki-sun	Uri Party	200,650	23.58
Kim Sung-jin	Democratic Labor Party	78,898	9.27
Shin Kyung-cheol	Democratic Party	44,339	5.21
Total		850,819	100.00
Valid votes		850,819	98.99
Invalid/blank votes		8,687	1.01
Total votes		859,506	100.00
Registered voters/turnout		1,940,403	44.30
Grand National hold			
Source: National Election Commission

=== Gwangju ===
Candidate	Party	Votes	%
Park Gwang-tae (incumbent)	Democratic Party	239,884	51.62
Cho Young-taek	Uri Party	157,756	33.95
Oh Byung-yoon	Democratic Labor Party	48,617	10.46
Han Young	Grand National Party	18,461	3.97
Total		464,718	100.00
Valid votes		464,718	99.02
Invalid/blank votes		4,598	0.98
Total votes		469,316	100.00
Registered voters/turnout		1,014,620	46.26
Democratic hold			
Source: National Election Commission

=== Daejeon ===
Candidate	Party	Votes	%
Park Sung-hyo	Grand National Party	231,489	43.84
Yeom Hong-cheol (incumbent)	Uri Party	217,273	41.15
Nam Choong-hee	People First Party	55,231	10.46
Park Choon-ho	Democratic Labor Party	14,899	2.82
Choi Ki-bok	Democratic Party	6,442	1.22
Koh Nak-jung	Hanmijun	2,707	0.51
Total		528,041	100.00
Valid votes		528,041	99.15
Invalid/blank votes		4,527	0.85
Total votes		532,568	100.00
Registered voters/turnout		1,077,468	49.43
Grand National gain from Uri			
Source: National Election Commission

=== Ulsan ===
Candidate	Party	Votes	%
Park Maeng-woo (incumbent)	Grand National Party	261,361	63.23
Noh Ok-hee	Democratic Labor Party	104,384	25.25
Sim Kyu-myung	Uri Party	47,579	11.51
Total		413,324	100.00
Valid votes		413,324	99.07
Invalid/blank votes		3,876	0.93
Total votes		417,200	100.00
Registered voters/turnout		790,289	52.79
Grand National hold			
Source: National Election Commission

=== Gyeonggi ===
Candidate	Party	Votes	%
Kim Moon-soo	Grand National Party	2,181,677	59.68
Jin Dae-je	Uri Party	1,124,317	30.76
Kim Yong-han	Democratic Labor Party	201,106	5.50
Park Jung-il	Democratic Party	148,409	4.06
Total		3,655,509	100.00
Valid votes		3,655,509	98.92
Invalid/blank votes		40,043	1.08
Total votes		3,695,552	100.00
Registered voters/turnout		7,918,828	46.67
Grand National hold			
Source: National Election Commission

=== Gangwon ===
Candidate	Party	Votes	%
Kim Jin-sun (incumbent)	Grand National Party	471,613	70.57
Lee Chang-bok	Uri Party	148,302	22.19
Yoo Jae-gyu	Democratic Party	29,028	4.34
Yoo Seung-gyu	People First Party	19,383	2.90
Total		668,326	100.00
Valid votes		668,326	98.05
Invalid/blank votes		13,307	1.95
Total votes		681,633	100.00
Registered voters/turnout		1,160,977	58.71
Grand National hold			
Source: National Election Commission

=== North Chungcheong ===
Candidate	Party	Votes	%
Chung Woo-taik	Grand National Party	361,157	59.66
Han Beom-deok	Uri Party	185,426	30.63
Bae Chang-ho	Democratic Labor Party	39,095	6.46
Cho Byung-se	People First Party	19,646	3.25
Total		605,324	100.00
Valid votes		605,324	98.26
Invalid/blank votes		10,729	1.74
Total votes		616,053	100.00
Registered voters/turnout		1,126,282	54.70
Grand National hold			
Source: National Election Commission

=== South Chungcheong ===
Candidate	Party	Votes	%
Lee Wan-koo	Grand National Party	379,420	46.31
Lee Myung-soo	People First	209,254	25.54
Oh Young-kyo	Uri Party	178,169	21.75
Lee Yong-gil	Democratic Labor Party	52,417	6.40
Total		819,260	100.00
Valid votes		819,260	97.71
Invalid/blank votes		19,202	2.29
Total votes		838,462	100.00
Registered voters/turnout		1,126,282	74.45
Grand National gain			
Source: National Election Commission

=== North Jeolla ===
Candidate	Party	Votes	%
Kim Wan-ju	Uri Party	389,436	48.08
Chung Kyun-hwan	Democratic Party	295,891	36.53
Moon Yong-ju	Grand National Party	62,922	7.77
Yeom Kyung-suk	Democratic Labor Party	61,672	7.61
Total		809,921	100.00
Valid votes		809,921	97.89
Invalid/blank votes		17,466	2.11
Total votes		827,387	100.00
Registered voters/turnout		1,429,632	57.87
Uri gain from Democratic			
Source: National Election Commission

=== South Jeolla ===
Candidate	Party	Votes	%
Park Jun-young	Democratic Party	640,894	67.69
Seo Beom-seok	Uri Party	181,756	19.20
Park Woong-doo	Democratic Labor Party	68,702	7.26
Park Jae-soon	Grand National Party	55,444	5.86
Total		946,796	100.00
Valid votes		946,796	97.22
Invalid/blank votes		27,024	2.78
Total votes		973,820	100.00
Registered voters/turnout		1,513,912	64.32
Democratic hold			
Source: National Election Commission

=== North Gyeongsang ===
Candidate	Party	Votes	%
Kim Kwan-yong	Grand National Party	961,363	76.80
Park Myung-jae	Uri Party	290,358	23.20
Total		1,251,721	100.00
Valid votes		1,251,721	97.46
Invalid/blank votes		32,621	2.54
Total votes		1,284,342	100.00
Registered voters/turnout		2,087,709	61.52
Grand National hold			
Source: National Election Commission

=== South Gyeongsang ===
Candidate	Party	Votes	%
Kim Tae-ho	Grand National Party	852,377	63.13
Kim Doo-kwan	Uri Party	343,137	25.41
Moon Sung-hyun	Democratic Labor Party	135,823	10.06
Kim Jae-ju	People First Party	18,906	1.40
Total		1,350,243	100.00
Valid votes		1,350,243	98.28
Invalid/blank votes		23,572	1.72
Total votes		1,373,815	100.00
Registered voters/turnout		2,375,265	57.84
Grand National hold			
Source: National Election Commission

=== Jeju ===
Candidate	Party	Votes	%
Kim Tae-hwan	Independent	117,244	42.73
Hyun Myung-gwan	Grand National Party	112,774	41.11
Jin Chul-hoon	Uri Party	44,334	16.16
Total		274,352	100.00
Valid votes		274,352	99.04
Invalid/blank votes		2,651	0.96
Total votes		277,003	100.00
Registered voters/turnout		411,862	67.26
Independent gain			
Source: National Election Commission

== Regional council elections ==
Party	Proportional			Constituency			Total seats	+/–
Party	Votes	%	Seats	Votes	%	Seats	Total seats	+/–
Grand National Party	10,086,354	53.76	38	9,291,686	50.81	519	557	+90
Uri Party	4,056,367	21.62	19	4,329,794	23.67	33	52	New
Democratic Labor Party	2,263,051	12.06	10	507,157	2.77	5	15	+4
Democratic Party	1,863,239	9.93	9	1,602,034	8.76	71	80	–63
People First Party	436,774	2.33	2	408,610	2.23	13	15	New
Hope Socialist Party	44,598	0.24	0	6,039	0.03	0	0	New
Citizens' Party	7,583	0.04	0				0	New
Hanmijun	5,112	0.03	0				0	New
Independents				2,143,480	11.72	14	14	–12
Total	18,763,078	100.00	78	18,288,800	100.00	655	733	+51
Valid votes	18,763,078	98.15		18,288,800	97.91			
Invalid/blank votes	354,516	1.85		389,807	2.09			
Total votes	19,117,594	100.00		18,678,607	100.00			
Registered voters/turnout	37,064,282	51.58		36,207,648	51.59			
Source: National Election Commission

=== Results by province or city ===
Province/City	Seats	GNP	DP	Uri	DLP	PFP	IND
Seoul	106	102	1	2	1		
Busan	47	45		1	1		
Daegu	29	28		1			
Incheon	33	32		1			
Gwangju	19		18	1			
Daejeon	19	17		1		1	
Ulsan	19	15			4		
Gyeonggi	119	115	1	2	1		
Gangwon	40	36		2	1		1
North Chungcheong	31	27		2			2
South Chungcheong	38	21		3		14	
North Jeolla	38		13	22	1		2
South Jeolla	51		46	3	1		1
North Gyeongsang	55	50		1	1		3
South Gyeongsang	53	47		1	2		3
Jeju	36	22	1	9	2		2
Total	733	557	80	52	15	15	14
Source: National Election Commission

=== Constituency seats ===
Province/City	Seats	GNP	DP	Uri	PFP	DLP	IND
Seoul	96	96					
Busan	42	42					
Daegu	26	26					
Incheon	30	30					
Gwangju	16		16				
Daejeon	16	16					
Ulsan	16	13				3	
Gyeonggi	108	108					
Gangwon	36	34		1			1
North Chungcheong	28	25		1			2
South Chungcheong	34	19		2	13		
North Jeolla	34		12	20			2
South Jeolla	46		43	2			1
North Gyeongsang	50	47					3
South Gyeongsang	48	44				1	3
Jeju	29	19		7		1	2
Total	655	519	71	33	13	5	14
Source: National Election Commission

=== Proportional representation seats ===
Province/City	Seats	GNP	Uri	DLP	DP	PFP
Seoul	10	6	2	1	1	
Busan	5	3	1	1		
Daegu	3	2	1			
Incheon	3	2	1			
Gwangju	3		1		2	
Daejeon	3	1	1			1
Ulsan	3	2		1		
Gyeonggi	11	7	2	1	1	
Gangwon	4	2	1	1		
North Chungcheong	3	2	1			
South Chungcheong	4	2	1			1
North Jeolla	4		2	1	1	
South Jeolla	5		1	1	3	
North Gyeongsang	5	3	1	1		
South Gyeongsang	5	3	1	1		
Jeju	7	3	2	1	1	
Total	78	38	19	10	9	2
Source: National Election Commission

== Municipal mayoral elections ==
Party	Votes	%	Seats	+/–
Grand National Party	9,396,305	50.76	155	+15
Uri Party	4,277,001	23.11	19	New
Democratic Party	1,530,908	8.27	20	–24
Democratic Labor Party	648,353	3.50	0	–2
People First Party	403,464	2.18	7	New
Hanmijun	4,176	0.02	0	New
Citizens' Paarty	482	0.00	–	New
Independents	2,250,127	12.16	29	–1
Total	18,510,816	100.00	230	–2
Source: National Election Commission

=== Results by province or city ===
Province/City	Mayors	GNP	DP	Uri	PFP	IND
Seoul	25	25				
Busan	16	15				1
Daegu	8	8				
Incheon	10	9				1
Gwangju	5		5			
Daejeon	5	5				
Ulsan	5	4				1
Gyeonggi	31	27		1		3
Gangwon	18	18				
North Chungcheong	12	5		4		3
South Chungcheong	16	6		3	7	
North Jeolla	14		5	4		5
South Jeolla	22		10	5		7
North Gyeongsang	23	19				4
South Gyeongsang	20	14		2		4
Total	230	155	20	19	7	29
Source: National Election Commission

== Municipal council elections ==
Party	Proportional			Constituency			Total seats	+/–
Party	Votes	%	Seats	Votes	%	Seats	Total seats	+/–
Grand National Party	9,422,971	54.02	220	8,317,356	45.41	1,401	1,621	New
Uri Party	4,196,455	24.06	87	3,544,024	19.35	543	630	New
Democratic Party	1,792,908	10.28	43	1,575,921	8.60	233	276	New
Democratic Labor Party	1,655,305	9.49	14	1,072,826	5.86	52	66	New
People First Party	376,675	2.16	11	390,755	2.13	56	67	New
Hanmijun				2,708	0.01	0	0	New
Hope Socialist Party				2,189	0.01	0	0	New
Citizens' Party				455	0.00	0	0	New
Independents				3,410,937	18.62	228	228	–3231
Total	17,444,314	100.00	375	18,317,171	100.00	2,513	2,888	–571
Source: National Election Commission

=== Results by province or city ===
Province/City	Seats	GNP	Uri	DP	PFP	DLP	IND
Seoul	419	261	142	12		2	2
Busan	182	154	26				2
Daegu	116	112	3				1
Incheon	112	71	36	1		2	2
Gwangju	68		20	39		8	1
Daejeon	63	35	24		4		
Ulsan	50	30	2			13	5
Gyeonggi	417	283	116	1		9	8
Gangwon	169	113	34				22
North Chungcheong	131	74	43			1	13
South Chungcheong	178	79	24		63	1	11
North Jeolla	197		96	62		9	30
South Jeolla	243		40	161		3	39
North Gyeongsang	284	217	7			3	57
South Gyeongsang	259	192	17			15	35
Total	2,888	1,621	630	276	67	66	228
Source: National Election Commission

=== Constituency seats ===
Province/City	Seats	GNP	Uri	DP	PFP	DLP	IND
Seoul	366	233	119	10		2	2
Busan	158	137	19				2
Daegu	102	99	2				1
Incheon	97	61	31	1		2	2
Gwangju	59		16	34		8	1
Daejeon	55	30	21		4		
Ulsan	43	25	2			11	5
Gyeonggi	364	245	103	1		7	8
Gangwon	146	92	32				22
North Chungcheong	114	61	39			1	13
South Chungcheong	152	66	22		52	1	11
North Jeolla	173		85	52		6	30
South Jeolla	211		34	135		3	39
North Gyeongsang	247	183	5			2	57
South Gyeongsang	226	169	13			9	35
Total	2,513	1,401	543	233	56	52	228
Source: National Election Commission>

=== Proportional representation seats ===
Province/City	Seats	GNP	Uri	DP	DLP	PFP
Seoul	53	28	23	2		
Busan	24	17	7			
Daegu	14	13	1			
Incheon	15	10	5			
Gwangju	9		4	5		
Daejeon	8	5	3			
Ulsan	7	5			2	
Gyeonggi	53	38	13		2	
Gangwon	23	21	2			
North Chungcheong	17	13	4			
South Chungcheong	26	13	2			11
North Jeolla	24		11	10	3	
South Jeolla	32		6	26		
North Gyeongsang	37	34	2		1	
South Gyeongsang	33	23	4		6	
Total	375	220	87	43	14	11
Source: National Election Commission
