= Oh Keo-don =

South Korean politician

- 오거돈
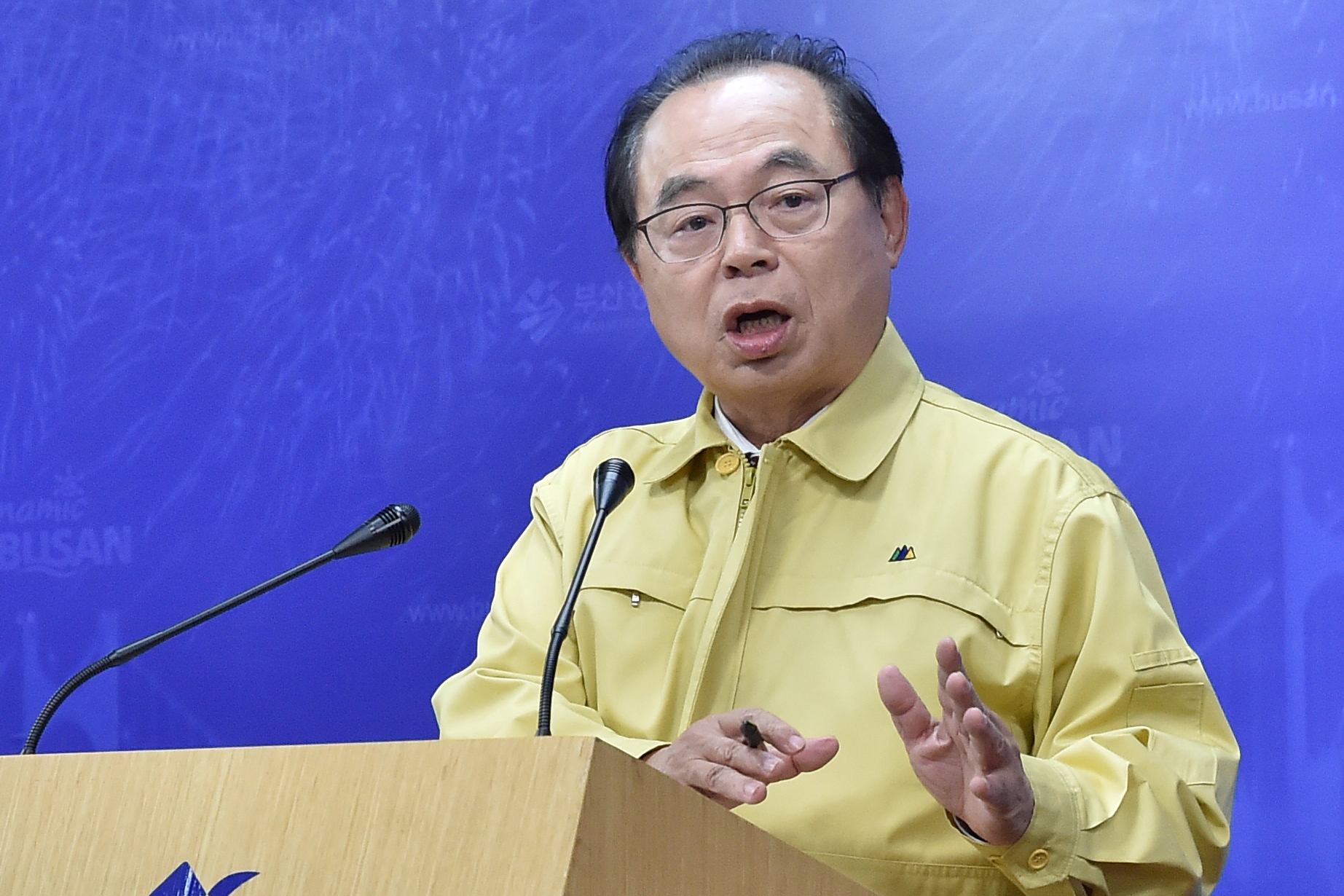
- Press briefing, 2019–20 coronavirus outbreak in Busan

Mayor of Busan
- In office 1 July 2018 – 23 April 2020
- Preceded by: Suh Byung-soo
- Succeeded by: Byeon Sung-wan (Acting); Kim Sun-jo (Acting); Lee Byung-jin (Acting); Park Heong-joon

Minister of Oceans and Fisheries
- In office 5 January 2005 – 26 March 2006
- President: Roh Moo-hyun
- Prime Minister: Lee Hae-chan; Han Duck-soo (Acting)
- Preceded by: Jang Seung-woo
- Succeeded by: Kim Sung-jin

Personal details
- Born: 28 October 1948 (age 78) Jung District, Busan, South Korea
- Party: Independent
- Other political affiliations: Democratic (-2020)
- Education: Seoul National University; Dong-a University
- Website: Oh Keo-don's Blog

Korean name
- Hangul: 오거돈
- Hanja: 吳巨敦
- RR: O Geodon
- MR: O Kŏdon

Oh Keo-don (Korean: 오거돈; born 28 October 1948) is a South Korean politician who served as the mayor of Busan from 2018 until his resignation in 2020.

== Early life ==
Oh Keo-don was born in Jung District, Busan in 1948. He passed the Public Administration and Public Administration Examination in 1973.

== Career ==
Oh served as Minister of Oceans and Fisheries from 2005 to 2006. On June 13, 2018, he was elected mayor of Busan, beating Suh Byung-soo of the Liberty Korea Party in the election.

== Election results ==
=== Local elections ===
==== Mayor of Busan ====
Year	Elections	Constituency	Political party	Votes (%)	Results
2004	2004 By-election	Busan (Mayoral Elections)	Uri	343,110 (37.70%)	Defeated (2nd)
2006	4th Iocal Election	Busan (Mayoral Elections)	Uri	329,470 (24.12%)	Defeated (2nd)
2014	6th Iocal Election	Busan (Mayoral Elections)	Independent	777,225 (49.34%)	Defeated (2nd)
2018	7th Iocal Election	Busan (Mayoral Elections)	Democratic	940,469 (55.23%)	Won

== Sexual harassment conviction ==
Oh Keo-don sexually harassed a female aide during a meeting on April 7, 2020.

However, it is a separate case from the #MeToo allegation claimed by Hover Lab. And when the victim demanded Oh Keo-don's resignation as mayor, he pledged to resign by the end of April and was notarized.

On April 23, 2020, he resigned as mayor that he had sexually harassed a female aide.

Immediately after Oh Keo-don announced his intention to resign, the victim expressed regret through the Korea Sexual Violence Counseling Center and did not report it to the police, even though he said that it was a punishable crime. The victim said, "I was summoned by Oh's secretary for the first time during work hours early this month, and I hurriedly went to the office to be sexually harassed by the words of business calls," adding, "I realized that I could be recognized as a forced molestation, regardless of the seriousness, I am afraid that I would be seen as an unusual person," adding, "There was no political pressure and no conciliation."

The next day, the leaders of the Democratic Party of Korea held an ethics committee meeting to decide to expel Oh Keo-don, but lacked a quorum. They unanimously decided to expel him on April 27, 2020.

On June 29, 2021 Oh was sentenced to three years in prison by Busan District Court for sexually assaulting and injuring two female employees as mayor. The court rejected his claims that his crimes could be excused due to his alleged dementia and cognitive problems.
