= Kim Hack-yong =

South Korean politician (born 1961)

Kim Hack-Yong
- 김학용

Member of the National Assembly
- In office 30 May 2008 – 29 May 2020
- In office 10 March 2022 – 29 May 2024

Personal details
- Born: 10 December 1961 (age 64)

Kim Hack-Yong (Korean: 김학용; Hanja: 金學容; born 10 December 1961) is a South Korean politician who is a member of the National Assembly.

He was elected in 2012. He had served on the National Defense Committee. In June 2019, he led a delegation to Vietnam to talk about businesses. In 2020, he was defeated for re-election. In March 2022, he was re-elected in a by-election with 54 percent of the vote.

== Election results ==
=== General elections ===
Year	Elections	Constituency	Political party	Votes (%)	Results
2008	18th National Assembly General Election	Anseong (Gyeonggi)	GNP	30,196 (58.93%)	Won
2012	19th National Assembly General Election	Anseong (Gyeonggi)	Saenuri	37,955 (55.36%)	Won
2016	20th National Assembly General Election	Anseong (Gyeonggi)	Saenuri	38,611 (50.22%)	Won
2020	21st National Assembly General Election	Anseong (Gyeonggi)	UFP	45,554 (47.13%)	Defeated
2022	March 2022 By-election	Anseong (Gyeonggi)	PPP	61,445 (54.18%)	Won
2024	22nd National Assembly General Election	Anseong (Gyeonggi)	PPP	49,049 (47.36%)	Defeated

=== Local elections ===
==== Gyeonggido Assembly ====
Year	Elections	Constituency	Political party	Votes (%)	Remarks
1995	1st Iocal Election	Anseong 3rd	DLP	10,980 (53.76%)	Won
1998	2nd Iocal Election	Anseong 1st	GNP	14,505 (57.67%)	Won
2002	3rd Iocal Election	Anseong 1st	GNP	18,637 (67.93%)	Won
