= Ryu Kwang-ji =

South Korean businessman (born 1966)

- 류광지
- Born: May 25, 1966 (age 59); Gunwi County, North Gyeongsang Province, South Korea
- Education: Korea University School of Law
- Occupation: Businessman
- Employer: Kumyang

Korean name
- Hangul: 류광지
- RR: Ryu Gwangji
- MR: Ryu Kwangji

Ryu Kwang-ji (Korean: 류광지; born May 25, 1966) is a South Korean businessman. The chairman of industrial chemical company Kumyang, he is among the richest people in South Korea. In April 2024, Forbes estimated Ryu's net worth to be US$1.22 billion and ranked him 28th richest in the country.

== Biography ==
He was born on May 25, 1966 in Gunwi County, North Gyeongsang Province, South Korea. He graduated from Neungin High School in 1985, and graduated from Korea University School of Law in 1990.

In 1994, he worked in mergers and acquisitions in Seoul Securities (서울증권). In 1998, he began working at Kumyang, initially in financial management. By 1999, he became head of the financial planning department. In 2001, he became the president of Kunming Jin Yang Chemical Industrial Co., Ltd in China (a factory of Kumyang in China). In November 2001, he became CEO of Kumyang; he has held this post since. As of March 2024, he was the largest shareholder in the company, holding 39.58% of the total company stock. A number of his relatives also each hold <1% of stock.

The company has reportedly made a profit in almost every year since 2003. Its salaries have reportedly increased around 10% every year since 2009. The company was reportedly obscure until around mid-2022, when it began moving into the electric vehicle battery industry. Afterwards, the company jumped around 2,000% amongst investor interest in the industry. Despite this, Kumyang then made most of its money from manufacturing blowing agents used in plastic foam in sneakers and other consumer products.
