= Shin Se-won =

South Korean painter

Shin Sewon (Sewon Shin/ Korean: 신세원, Hanja: 申世圓) is a South Korean artist. He is the founder of Trans-Art (Transcendental Art).

His art provided a basis for the reformation of the Korean religious foundation known as Hanol-gyo.

== Career ==
- Grand prize in the 28th Korean National Youth Art competition
- Georgetown Preparatory school, MD., USA
- Oxford University, Politics Philosophy and Economics (PPE) B.A., M.A.
- (Former) CEO of HI&T Inc.
- (Former) Chairman of Hanon Group
- (Former) Chairman of Hanol foundation
- Honorary Consul of Iraq in Korea
- Founder of Trans-Art

== Early exhibitions ==
Sewon Shin studied in the United States as a reward of winning 1st prize in the 28th Korean National Youth Art competition at the age of 13. (At that time, Korea was under a strict military regime and studying abroad was prohibited).

He held two solo exhibitions in Seoul and Tokyo while he was in high school.

- First Solo Exhibition in Seoul, Korea at the age of 17
  - Sponsor: Seoul Kyung-in Gallery, Monthly Art World
  - Support: The Chosun Daily Newspaper
- Second Solo Exhibition in Tokyo, Japan at the age of 19
  - Sponsor: Tokyo Odakyu Gallery, The Korean-Japanese Cultural Exchange Association
  - Cooperation: The Sankei Newspaper

At the Tokyo exhibition, he introduced a new concept of art called 'Super-individualism art (i.e. Trans-Ego art)'. In conveying Super-Individualism Art, he combined music, scent, optical illusion and time & space factors, and proposed the use of an orchestra, a train and train station and even a whole mountain in the performance of his art.

== Business ==
After his attempt to use Seoul Namsan Tower to perform his new concept of installation art failed (due to city regulations), he decided to refrain from his art. After graduating from Georgetown Prep school, instead of pursuing art, he majored in Politics, Philosophy and Economics at Oxford University.

However, Sewon's father had a stroke while he was attending his son's graduation at Oxford (he was hospitalized in Radcliffe Infirmary), and died a year after he was transferred to Korea.

His father was the founder of Hanol religious foundation, as well as a politician (the Presidential Candidate of the Unified Korea Party who ran for the Presidency of South Korea twice), and an entrepreneur (the Chairman of the Hanon Group).

After the founder died, as a legal descendant, Sewon inevitably took on his father’s entire responsibility and restructured the foundation.

As a deputy Chairman of the Hanon Group and CEO of HI&T (a holding company), he restructured most of its subsidiary companies and finalized his father’s major business initiatives, including an agreement to develop one of the largest crude oil mines in Iraq (a consortium with Samsung, SK, Korean National Oil Development Corporation, where HI&T was the Managing Partner & Directing Initiator). He also acquired an official agreement to develop internet-telecommunication systems for the Iraqi government. (unexecuted due to the Iraq war)

His business and diplomatic contributions were recognized by both the Korean and Iraqi governments: On the request of the Iraqi National Assembly and the Ministry of Foreign Affairs, and after the approval of Korean Ministry of Foreign Affairs and Trade (Minister’s approval), he was appointed to the Honorary Consul in 2000. He was very dedicated to humanitarian activities for children suffering from the war in Iraq. He supplied them with medicine and his brother, Se-Yong Shin established UHIC (United Help for International Children), an organization which is very active in helping suffering children all over the world.

In 2001, he was selected as one of ‘21 young power leaders of Korea of the 21st century' by the Seoul Economy - Financial Daily.

== Spiritual art ==
After stabilizing the Hanon group, Sewon was obliged to restructure the Hanol religious foundation. He attempted to integrate ‘art’ with ‘Spirituality’ in order to transform Hanol-gyo into a more liberal, flexible and innovative organization. His art provided a basis for the reformation of Hanol-gyo.

In accordance with the founder’s last will, he succeeded in persuading the board and the Hanol spiritual committee to officially approve ‘Spiritual Acceptance’ which makes religious conversion unnecessary and constitutionalized religious multiplicity to allow its participants from diverse backgrounds to practice other religions as well.

According to the guidance to Hanol-gyo, he expressed the essence of the transcendental teachings on enlightenment and awakening - the self-liberation of consciousness.

"Illuminating the uncontaminated lights of Enlightenment Art could represent the quintessence of the Hanol Spirit better than a thousand books about its analysis or explanation."
— Hanol-gyo official website, Hanol Innovation

He officially proclaimed that the symbolic function of the regional chapels of HANOL could be replaced by the “Art of Enlightenment”, and allowed particular traditional ceremonies and the formality of rituals to be substituted by a simple contemplation on the Spiritual Art or meditation on self-awareness. He attempted to transform the existing belief system by integrating ‘Art and Spirituality’. Sewon introduced the concept of 'Spiritual Audience' instead of the traditional notion of religious followers.

After Sewon Shin reformed the Hanol-gyo foundation, he resigned from all of his duties and returned to his art in order to introduce a new form of art called Trans-art.

== Trans-Art ==
Trans-Art (also known as Trans-form Art or Transcendental Art) can be considered as the re-establishment of the 'Art of Enlightenment and Awakening’ in a fine art form (non-religious form) and the elaboration of "Super-Individual art (i.e. Trans-ego art)” which he introduced at the Tokyo exhibition.

In Part 1: Optical Awakening, the artist expresses spiritual transcendence by using the multi-dimensional perspectives that he acquired from his own personal experience of spiritual awakening.

In Part 2: Tasting Art (Taste of Awakening), he integrates Art with Taste in order to express a glimpse of awakening by providing an extraordinary tasting experience.

In Part 3: Mobile Art, he combines Technology with Art; the audience can participate in art directly, experiencing their collective sentiment using a smart-phone devices.

According to the official website, "Trans-Art is ‘art’ that transcends the conventional form of art: the Trans-artist attempts to express the ‘Enlightenment and Awakening’, which is beyond ‘Form’, by using the ‘multi-dimensional expression method’ that he acquired from his own experience of the ‘enlightening and awakening’ process."

According to the guidance to Trans-Art, Trans Art Part 1, the multi-dimensional expression of "Enlightenment and Awakening", can be perceived and experienced as an indirect experience of ‘Spiritual Transcendence’ and a ‘Glimpse of Awakening’ in the form of art – “the preview of the Ego dis-identification which entails the separation of Mind (Ego) & Consciousness (True Nature)”.

In his major work, the ‘Optical Awakening series’, the artist shows the consecutive stages of the ‘Enlightenment and Awakening’ process based on his own experience. The series comprises 'Awakening Dimensions', ‘Initiation of Awakening’, ‘Awakening True-Nature’, ‘Flash of Enlightening’, ‘Trans-Perceiving Ego’, ‘Dark-side of Ego’, ‘Trans-Quantum Physics of Mind’, ‘Trans-Perceiving Mental Synapse’, ‘Self-Liberation’, ‘Breaking Free’, ‘Quest for Immortality’, and ‘Trans-Perception’.

== Hanol Spiritual and Cultural Movement of Art ==
Hanol Spiritual and Cultural Movement of Art refers to a new type of religious endeavor through which anyone can experience the “Hanol philosophy” through art, without religious obligation or participation.

In commemoration of the 50th anniversary re-establishment, Hanol-gyo general assembly officially agreed upon reformation and endorsed the Hanol Spiritual & Cultural Movement of Art.

At the official request of Hanol-gyo, the artist provided his artworks for the Hanol Spiritual & Cultural Movement of Art which enabled the audience to experience the philosophy of “Spiritual Acceptance” of diverse spiritual culture without any conventional religious activity.

His art provided the basis for the 1st and the 2nd reformation of Hanol-gyo. It presented a new possibility for the “Spiritual Acceptance” of diverse culture and structural evolution of religion by expanding the religious boundaries to include a wider perspective.

== The Gates ==
"The Gates", the signature artwork of Optical Awakening, is inspired by la Porte de I'Enfer -The Gates of Hell, the unfinished masterpiece by Rodin.

The Artist reinterpreted The Gates of Hell and re-established it as the ‘Gates of Heaven(Nirvana)’ by using a mirror that symbolizes the reflection of the perceiver's inner state.

While The Gates of Hell symbolizes the beginning of indefinite suffering from one side, it could also symbolize the end of suffering from the other side if one could extricate oneself from hell through the gates.

He reconciles the Western religious definition of Hell (The beginning of endless suffering or the punishment of God) with the Eastern Buddhist terminology of Nirvana (The end of suffering).

The Gates series were developed into different forms such as sculpture, painting, lenticular and online art.

== Tasting-Art ==
Trans-Art Part 2 Tasting Art, is to express and experience a glimpse of your ‘True Nature : your inner quality which allows you to recognize beauty in the first place’ by providing an extraordinary tasting experience.

The artist uses ‘taste’ as a means to express a glimpse of awakening by providing a 'once in a lifetime tasting exhibition' for an audience to experience the moment of speechless and mindless state of consciousness.

His first Tasting Art exhibition was held at the UE restaurant and cultural space, Samsungdong, Kangnamgu, Seoul, Korea, introducing opus 1 ‘Tasting Blossom’, opus 2 ‘Korean Suicide Stopper’ and opus 3 ’The Cho’.

== Evolving Art ==
The Korean Trans-Artist Team (KTAT, Phase 3) introduced a new form of art called “Evolving Art”, as its 3rd major project.

The Evolving Art is an online art project that literally evolves indefinitely as long as its number of participants increases. The Evolving Art, namely <Super O>, is designed to expand its features using either the macro scale expansion method or the micro-quantum scale expansion method in which it continues to evolve indefinitely without limitations of time and space through an algorithm that expands in either macro scale or micro scales.

The circular O-shape of <Super O> symbolizes the common denominator of L”O”VE, H”O”PE, and “O”NENESS. It also represents the necessity of mutual co-existence of the human race, which aspires to transcend all barriers such as the conflicts and confrontations between ideologies, religions, states, races, genders, and cultures through this new type of art movement.

== See also ==
- Trans-Art
- Hanol-gyo
- Shin Jeong Yil
