= Kim Gi-hyeon =

South Korean politician (born 1959)

Kim Gi-hyeon MP
- 김기현
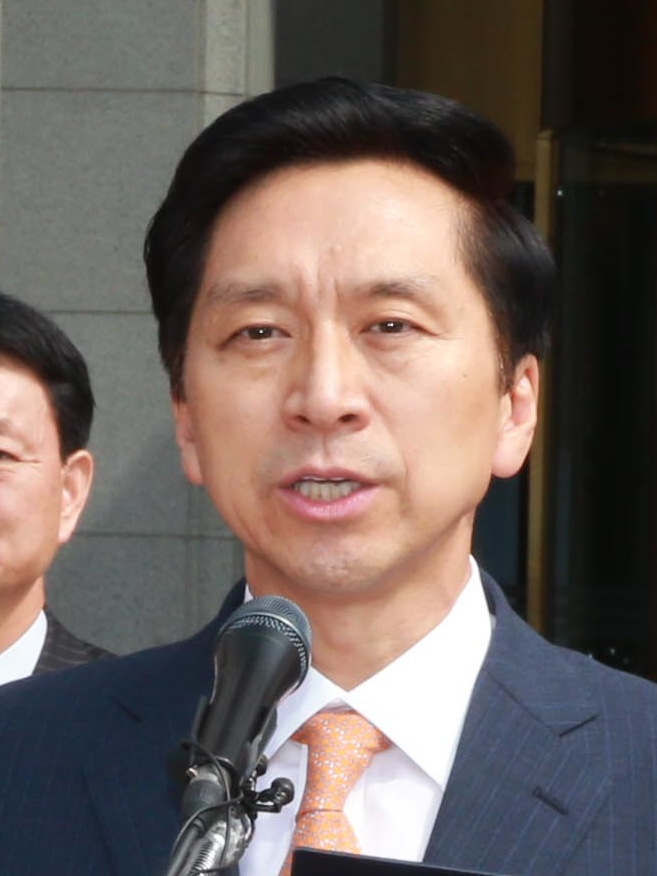

Leader of the People Power Party
- In office 8 March 2023 – 13 December 2023
- Preceded by: Lee Jun-seok; Kweon Seong-dong (acting); Joo Ho-young (acting); Kweon Seong-dong (acting); Chung Jin-suk (interim)
- Succeeded by: Yun Jae-ok (acting); Han Dong-hoon (interim); Yun Jae-ok (acting); Hwang Woo-yea (interim); Han Dong-hoon
- Interim; 30 April 2021 – 11 June 2021
- Preceded by: Joo Ho-young (acting)
- Succeeded by: Lee Jun-seok

Floor Leader of the People Power Party
- In office 30 April 2021 – 8 April 2022
- Preceded by: Joo Ho-young
- Succeeded by: Kweon Seong-dong

Mayor of Ulsan
- In office 1 July 2014 – 30 June 2018
- Preceded by: Park Maeng-woo; Park Sung-hwan (acting)
- Succeeded by: Song Cheol-ho

Member of the National Assembly
- Incumbent
- Assumed office 30 May 2020
- Preceded by: Park Maeng-woo
- Constituency: Ulsan Nam B
- In office 30 May 2004 – 15 May 2014
- Preceded by: Choi Byung-kook (as Nam, Ulsan)
- Succeeded by: Park Maeng-woo
- Constituency: Ulsan Nam B

Personal details
- Born: 21 February 1959 (age 67) Sanha-ri, Gangdong-myeon, Ulju, South Gyeongsang, South Korea
- Party: People Power
- Other political affiliations: GNP (2003–2012); Saenuri (2012–2017); LKP (2017–2020); UFP (2020)
- Spouse: Lee Sun-ae
- Children: 3
- Parent: Kim Byung-geuk
- Education: Seoul National University
- Occupation: Lawyer, politician

Kim Gi-hyeon (Korean: 김기현, born 21 February 1959) is a South Korean lawyer and politician who served as the Mayor of Ulsan from 2014 to 2018. He was the acting leader of the People Power Party from April to June 2021.

== Career ==
Kim Gi-hyeon was born in Sanha-ri, Gangdong-myeon, Ulju, South Gyeongsang (now Gangdong-dong, North District, Ulsan) in 1959. He is the 4th of 6 children of Kim Byung-geuk, the former Member of the South Gyeongsang Legislative Assembly from 1960 to 1961.

He attended to Busan East High School before studying law at Seoul National University. After qualifying for the bar in 1983, he worked in various non-governmental organisations i.e. Director of YMCA in Ulsan.

He was appointed the deputy spokesperson of the Grand National Party (GNP) in 2003. In 2004, he ran for Nam B constituency and was elected. He was re-elected in 2008 and 2012. On 12 April 2014, he contested Saenuri preselection for Ulsan mayorship and defeated Kang Ghil-boo. He resigned his parliamentary membership on 5 May in order to register his candidacy. On 4 June, he received 65.42% and defeated the Justice candidate Jo Seung-soo.

Following the election, Kim showed his intention to run for the 2017 election, comparing an example of Bill Clinton, the former Governor of Arkansas who was elected the President of the United States. Following the political scandal in 2016, he was expected to leave his party, but confirmed to remain.

In 2018, Kim was again nominated the Ulsan Mayor candidate for the 2018 local elections. Initially, he led on some polls due to his high popularity. Nevertheless, he then came behind to the Democratic candidate Song Cheol-ho. On 13 June, he finally lost to the Democratic candidate.

On 29 January 2020, Kim launched his bid for the 2020 election. He contested UFP preselection for Nam B constituency and defeated Park Maeng-woo.

On 30 April 2021, Kim was elected the new parliamentary leader of the People Power Party (PPP), defeating Kim Tae-heum, Kweon Seong-dong and Yu Eui-dong. He also served as the acting party President until Lee Jun-seok was elected the new president on 11 June. He resigned as the parliamentary leader on 3 January 2022, but returned to the position 3 days later. On 29 March, he made his resignation without coming back to the position, in order to refurbish the party leadership.

== Ideology ==
Kim's political position is described as conservative within the context of South Korean politics. While serving as an MP, he was a member of South Korean centrist groups within the Grand National Party (GNP). He is pro-Lee Myung-bak. He is critical of the welfare system.

== Personal life ==
Kim is married to Lee Sun-ae and has a son and a daughter.

== Election results ==
=== General elections ===
| Year | Elections | Constituency | Political party | Votes (%) | Remarks |
|---|---|---|---|---|---|
| 2004 | 17th National Assembly General Election | Nan B (Ulsan) | GNP | 29,347 (45.56%) | Won |
| 2008 | 18th National Assembly General Election | Nam B (Ulsan) | GNP | 30,077 (62.00%) | Won |
| 2012 | 19th National Assembly General Election | Nam B (Ulsan) | Saenuri | 38,054 (56.57%) | Won |
| 2020 | 21st National Assembly General Election | Nam B (Ulsan) | UFP | 48,933 (58.48%) | Won |
| 2024 | 22nd National Assembly General Election | Nam B (Ulsan) | PPP | 44,502 (56.22%) | Won |

=== Local elections ===
==== Mayor of Ulsan ====
| Year | Elections | Constituency | Political party | Votes (%) | Remarks |
|---|---|---|---|---|---|
| 2014 | 6th Iocal Election | Ulsan (Mayoral Elections) | Saenuri | 306,311 (65.42%) | Won |
| 2018 | 7th Iocal Election | Ulsan (Mayoral Elections) | LKP | 240,475 (40.07%) | Defeated (2nd) |
