= Kim Sang-wook (politician) =

South Korean politician (born 1980)

- 김상욱
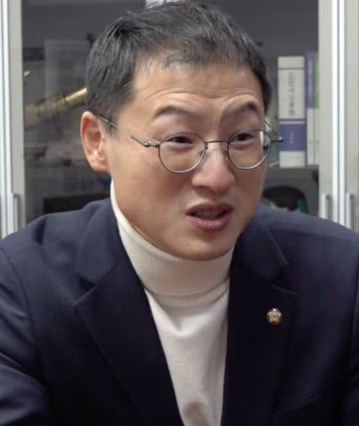
- Kim in 2025

Mayor of Ulsan
- Incumbent
- Assumed office 1 July 2026
- Preceded by: Kim Doo-gyeom

Member of the National Assembly
- In office 30 May 2024 – 29 April 2026
- Preceded by: Lee Chae-ik
- Succeeded by: Kim Tae-kyu
- Constituency: Ulsan Nam A

Personal details
- Born: 1 January 1980 (age 46) Uiseong County, North Gyeongsang, South Korea
- Party: Democratic (2025–present)
- Other political affiliations: People Power (2021–2025); Independent (2025)
- Children: 2
- Education: Korea University School of Law; Pusan National University; Jagiellonian University
- Occupation: Lawyer, politician

Kim Sang-wook (Korean: 김상욱; born 1 January 1980) is a South Korean lawyer and politician who has served as the mayor of Ulsan since 2026. He has been a member of the Democratic Party of Korea (DPK) since 18 May 2025. Kim was formerly a member of the People Power Party but left due to his support of the impeachment of Yoon Suk Yeol.

== Early life and career ==
Born on 1 January 1980 in Uiseong County, North Gyeongsang Province, he spent his childhood in Daegu. After graduated from Daedong Elementary School, Daegu Buk Middle School, and Yeungjin High School in Daegu, he entered the Korea University School of Law in Seoul. He was served at Jeju Provincial Police Agency as conscripted police from 27 January 2000 to 26 March 2002.

After graduating from Korea University School of Law in 2006, he worked at Hyundai Marine & Fire Insurance and Woori Bank until the end of 2008, and entered the first class of Pusan National University School of Law in 2009. He passed the first bar exam in 2012. After that, he worked as a lawyer in Ulsan Metropolitan City Mayor Office, where he had no relationship with the city before.

His first place of work was the office of Song Cheol-ho, a lawyer at the Jungwoo Law Firm, a stronghold of the previous incarnation of Democratic Party at the time, and he was attacked a lot during People Power Party's nomination candidate due to his controversy for supporting the 2012 presidential candidate Moon Jae-in. After that, he went to the law firm Woodeok, the largest law firm in Ulsan at the time, and founded and operated J&S Law Firm in 2014 and The Jung Sung Law Firm in 2017.

=== Political career ===
In 2021, he joined People Power Party and registered as a preliminary candidate for the 21st legislative election in late January 2024. On 15 March 2024, he was nominated throughout the national recommendation system as the only candidate for Ulsan Nam District A constituency. After clashing with lawmakers of his own party over the 2024 South Korean martial law crisis, Kim left the People Power Party May 2025 and switched to the Democratic Party. On April 30, 2026, Kim resigned his seat in order to run for Mayor of Ulsan. He won the mayoral election on 3 June, defeating incumbent mayor Kim Doo-gyeom of the PPP.

== Election results ==
=== General elections ===
Year	Elections	Constituency	Political party	Votes (%)	Remarks
2024	22nd National Assembly General Election	Nam A (Ulsan)	People Power	50,066 (53.86%)	Won

=== Local elections ===
==== Mayor of Ulsan ====
Year	Elections	Constituency	Political party	Votes (%)	Remarks
2026	9th Iocal Election	Ulsan (Mayor Elections)	Democratic	285,294 (48.73%)	Won
