= KU Law =

KU Law may refer to:

- Korea University Law School, a law school in the Republic of Korea.
- University of Kansas School of Law, a public law school in the U.S. State of Kansas.
