= Kim Sang-wook =

Kim Sang-wook may refer to:

- Kim Sang-wook (fencer) (born 1964), South Korean fencer
- Kim Sang-wook (ice hockey) (born 1988), South Korean ice hockey player
- Kim Sang-wook (politician) (born 1980), South Korean politician
