= Park Maeng-woo =

South Korean politician (born 1951)

- 박맹우

Secretary General of the Liberty Korea Party
- In office 11 May 2017 – 5 June 2017

Mayor of Ulsan
- In office 1 July 2002 – 31 March 2014
- Preceded by: Shim Wan-koo
- Succeeded by: Park Sung-hwan (acting); Kim Gi-hyeon

Member of the National Assembly
- In office 31 July 2014 – 29 May 2020
- Preceded by: Kim Gi-hyeon
- Succeeded by: Kim Gi-hyeon
- Constituency: Nam B (Ulsan)

Personal details
- Born: 6 December 1951 (age 74) Ulsan, South Korea
- Party: Independent
- Children: 2

Military service
- Branch/service: Army
- Rank: Lance corporal

Korean name
- Hangul: 박맹우
- Hanja: 朴孟雨
- RR: Bak Maengu
- MR: Pak Maengu

Park Maeng-woo (Korean: 박맹우; born 6 December 1951) is a South Korean politician who formerly served as Mayor of Ulsan from 2002 to 2014.

== Education ==
- 1980: Graduated from Kookmin University with a degree in political science
- 2001: Graduated from the Political Science Graduate School at Kyungnam University, receiving a master's degree in political science
- 2006: Graduated from Dong-eui University, receiving a PhD in political science

== Election results ==
=== General elections ===
Year	Elections	Constituency	Political party	Votes (%)	Results
2014	2014 By-election	Nam B (Ulsan)	Saenuri	20,686 (55.81%)	Won
2016	20th National Assembly General Election	Nam B (Ulsan)	Saenuri	29,838 (42.97%)	Won

=== Local elections ===
==== Mayor of Ulsan ====
Year	Elections	Constituency	Political party	Votes (%)	Remarks
2002	3rd Iocal Election	Ulsan (Mayoral Elections)	GNP	197,772 (53.07%)	Won
2006	4th Iocal Election	Ulsan (Mayoral Elections)	GNP	261,361 (63.23%)	Won
2010	5th Iocal Election	Ulsan (Mayoral Elections)	GNP	279,421 (61.26%)	Won
2026	9th Iocal Election	Ulsan (Mayoral Elections)	Independent	32,363 (5.52%)	Defeated (3rd)
