= 2002 South Korean local elections =

- 13 June 2002

16 regional heads 682 regional councilors 232 municipal mayors 3,485 municipal councilors
- Registered: 34,744,232
- Turnout: 16,973,662; 48.9% (▼3.8pp)
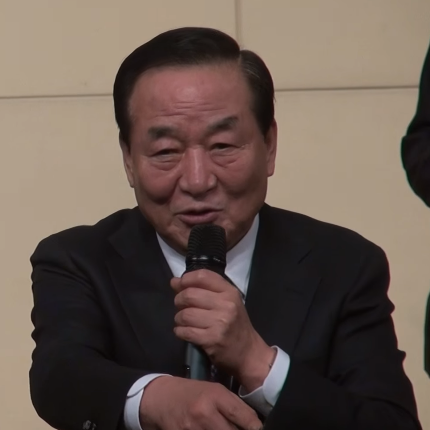

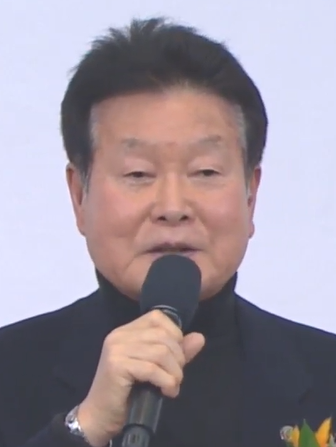

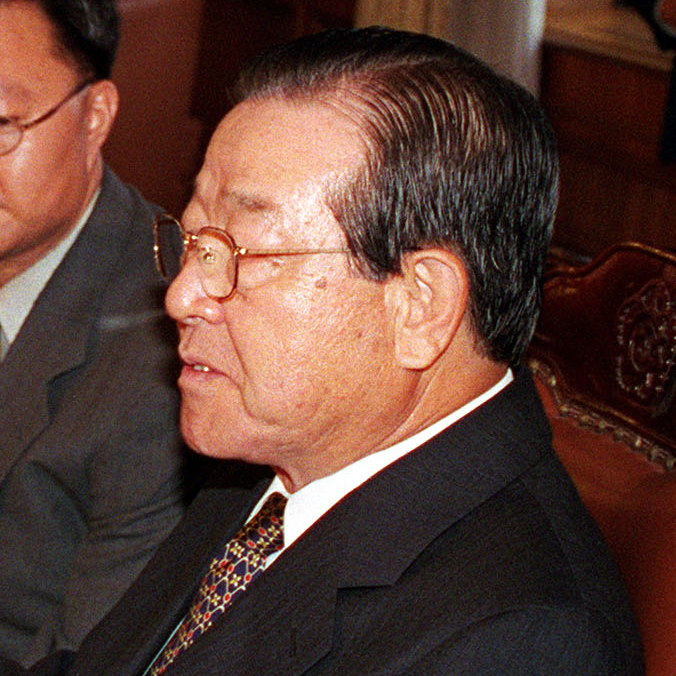
| | First party | Second party | Third party |
|---|---|---|---|
| Leader | Suh Chung-won | Han Hwa-gap | Kim Jong-pil |
| Party | Grand National | Millennium Democratic | ULD |
| Regional seats last election | 6 heads 253 councilors | 6 heads 303 councilors | 4 heads 95 councilors |
| Municipal seats last election | 74 mayors | 84 mayors | 29 mayors |
| Regional seats won | 11 heads 467 councilors | 4 heads 143 councilors | 1 head 33 councilors |
| Regional seat change | ▲5 heads ▲214 councilors | ▼2 heads ▼160 councilors | ▼3 heads ▼62 councilors |
| Municipal seats won | 140 mayors | 44 mayors | 16 mayors |
| Municipal seat change | ▲66 mayors | ▼40 mayors | ▼13 mayors |

- Municipal Leaders ■ Grand National Party ■ Millennium Democratic Party ■ United Liberal Democrats ■ Independent ■ Democratic Labor Party

The 3rd Local Elections were held in South Korea on 13 June 2002. The ruling Millennium Democratic Party was defeated by the opposition Grand National Party, only controlled Gwangju, Jeolla and Jeju.

== Regional head elections ==
=== Summary ===
| Province/City | Head | Incumbent | Party | Elected | Party |
|---|---|---|---|---|---|
| Seoul | Mayor | Goh Kun | Millennium Democratic | Lee Myung-bak | Grand National |
| Busan | Mayor | Ahn Sang-yeong | Grand National | Ahn Sang-yeong | Grand National |
| Daegu | Mayor | Moon Hee-gap | Grand National | Cho Hae-nyung | Grand National |
| Incheon | Mayor | Choi Ki-sun | Independent | Ahn Sang-soo | Grand National |
| Gwangju | Mayor | Goh Jae-yu | Millennium Democratic | Park Gwang-tae | Millennium Democratic |
| Daejeon | Mayor | Hong Sun-ki | ULD | Yeom Hong-cheol | Grand National |
| Ulsan | Mayor | Shim Wan-koo | Millennium Democratic | Park Maeng-woo | Grand National |
| Gyeonggi | Governor | Lim Chang-yeol | Millennium Democratic | Sohn Hak-kyu | Grand National |
| Gangwon | Governor | Kim Jin-sun | Grand National | Kim Jin-sun | Grand National |
| North Chungcheong | Governor | Lee Won-jong | Grand National | Lee Won-jong | Grand National |
| South Chungcheong | Governor | Sim Dae-pyung | ULD | Sim Dae-pyung | ULD |
| North Jeolla | Governor | Yu Jong-geun | Millennium Democratic | Kang Hyun-wook | Millennium Democratic |
| South Jeolla | Governor | Heo Kyeong-man | Millennium Democratic | Park Tae-young | Millennium Democratic |
| North Gyeongsang | Governor | Lee Eui-geun | Grand National | Lee Eui-geun | Grand National |
| South Gyeongsang | Governor | Kim Hyuk-ku | Grand National | Kim Hyuk-ku | Grand National |
| Jeju | Governor | Woo Geun-min | Millennium Democratic | Woo Geun-min | Millennium Democratic |

=== Seoul ===
| Candidate | Party | Votes | % |
|---|---|---|---|
| Lee Myung-bak | Grand National Party | 1,819,057 | 52.29 |
| Kim Min-seok | Millennium Democratic Party | 1,496,754 | 43.02 |
| Lee Moon-ok | Democratic Labor Party | 87,965 | 2.53 |
| Lee Kyung-hee | Independent | 34,313 | 0.99 |
| Lim Sam-jin | Green Peace Party | 28,034 | 0.81 |
| Won Yong-soo | Socialist Party | 12,982 | 0.37 |
| Total | | 3,479,105 | 100.00 |
| Valid votes | | 3,479,105 | 99.09 |
| Invalid/blank votes | | 31,793 | 0.91 |
| Total votes | | 3,510,898 | 100.00 |
| Registered voters/turnout | | 7,665,343 | 45.80 |
| Grand National gain from Millennium Democratic | | | |
Source: National Election Commission

=== Busan ===
| Candidate | Party | Votes | % |
|---|---|---|---|
| Ahn Sang-yeong (incumbent) | Grand National Party | 729,589 | 63.77 |
| Han Ih-heon | Millennium Democratic Party | 221,938 | 19.40 |
| Kim Seok-joon | Democratic Labor Party | 192,594 | 16.83 |
| Total | | 1,144,121 | 100.00 |
| Valid votes | | 1,144,121 | 98.37 |
| Invalid/blank votes | | 18,919 | 1.63 |
| Total votes | | 1,163,040 | 100.00 |
| Registered voters/turnout | | 2,784,721 | 41.77 |
| Grand National hold | | | |
Source: National Election Commission

=== Daegu ===
| Candidate | Party | Votes | % |
|---|---|---|---|
| Cho Hae-nyung | Grand National Party | 452,943 | 61.18 |
| Lee Jae-yong | Independent | 287,396 | 38.82 |
| Total | | 740,339 | 100.00 |
| Valid votes | | 740,339 | 98.45 |
| Invalid/blank votes | | 11,655 | 1.55 |
| Total votes | | 751,994 | 100.00 |
| Registered voters/turnout | | 1,814,278 | 41.45 |
| Grand National hold | | | |
Source: National Election Commission

=== Incheon ===
| Candidate | Party | Votes | % |
|---|---|---|---|
| Ahn Sang-soo | Grand National Party | 393,932 | 56.18 |
| Park Sang-eun | Millennium Democratic Party | 225,210 | 32.12 |
| Kim Chang-han | Democratic Labor Party | 35,234 | 5.02 |
| Shin Maeng-soon | Green Peace Party | 29,473 | 4.20 |
| Kim Young-kyu | Socialist Party | 17,404 | 2.48 |
| Total | | 701,253 | 100.00 |
| Valid votes | | 701,253 | 98.55 |
| Invalid/blank votes | | 10,349 | 1.45 |
| Total votes | | 711,602 | 100.00 |
| Registered voters/turnout | | 1,809,907 | 39.32 |
| Grand National gain from Independent | | | |
Source: National Election Commission

=== Gwangju ===
| Candidate | Party | Votes | % |
|---|---|---|---|
| Park Gwang-tae | Millennium Democratic Party | 185,938 | 46.82 |
| Chung Dong-nyun | Independent | 107,415 | 27.05 |
| Lee Hwan-eui | Grand National Party | 43,695 | 11.00 |
| Park Jong-hyun | Democratic Labor Party | 29,427 | 7.41 |
| Chung Ho-sun | Independent | 20,796 | 5.24 |
| Chung Koo-sun | Independent | 9,877 | 2.49 |
| Total | | 397,148 | 100.00 |
| Valid votes | | 397,148 | 98.35 |
| Invalid/blank votes | | 6,673 | 1.65 |
| Total votes | | 403,821 | 100.00 |
| Registered voters/turnout | | 954,481 | 42.31 |
| Millenium Democratic hold | | | |
Source: National Election Commission

=== Daejeon ===
| Candidate | Party | Votes | % |
|---|---|---|---|
| Yeom Hong-cheol | Grand National Party | 191,832 | 46.62 |
| Hong Sun-ki (incumbent) | United Liberal Democrats | 165,426 | 40.20 |
| Chung Ha-yong | Independent | 38,445 | 9.34 |
| Kim Heon-tae | Independent | 15,780 | 3.83 |
| Total | | 411,483 | 100.00 |
| Valid votes | | 411,483 | 98.49 |
| Invalid/blank votes | | 6,326 | 1.51 |
| Total votes | | 417,809 | 100.00 |
| Registered voters/turnout | | 987,180 | 42.32 |
| Grand National gain from United Liberal Democrats | | | |
Source: National Election Commission

=== Ulsan ===
| Candidate | Party | Votes | % |
|---|---|---|---|
| Park Maeng-woo | Grand National Party | 197,772 | 53.07 |
| Song Cheol-ho | Democratic Labor Party | 162,546 | 43.62 |
| Ahn Seung-chun | Socialist Party | 12,329 | 3.31 |
| Total | | 372,647 | 100.00 |
| Valid votes | | 372,647 | 98.55 |
| Invalid/blank votes | | 5,474 | 1.45 |
| Total votes | | 378,121 | 100.00 |
| Registered voters/turnout | | 722,806 | 52.31 |
| Grand National gain from Millennium Democratic | | | |
Source: National Election Commission

=== Gyeonggi ===
| Candidate | Party | Votes | % |
|---|---|---|---|
| Sohn Hak-kyu | Grand National Party | 1,744,291 | 58.38 |
| Jin Nyum | Millennium Democratic Party | 1,075,243 | 35.99 |
| Kim Joon-ki | Democratic Labor Party | 168,357 | 5.63 |
| Total | | 2,987,891 | 100.00 |
| Valid votes | | 2,987,891 | 98.78 |
| Invalid/blank votes | | 36,953 | 1.22 |
| Total votes | | 3,024,844 | 100.00 |
| Registered voters/turnout | | 6,777,575 | 44.63 |
| Grand National gain from Millennium Democratic | | | |
Source: National Election Commission

=== Gangwon ===
| Candidate | Party | Votes | % |
|---|---|---|---|
| Kim Jin-sun (incumbent) | Grand National Party | 468,987 | 71.12 |
| Nam Dong-woo | Millennium Democratic Party | 190,451 | 28.88 |
| Total | | 659,438 | 100.00 |
| Valid votes | | 659,438 | 98.24 |
| Invalid/blank votes | | 11,804 | 1.76 |
| Total votes | | 671,242 | 100.00 |
| Registered voters/turnout | | 1,129,859 | 59.41 |
| Grand National hold | | | |
Source: National Election Commission

=== North Chungcheong ===
| Candidate | Party | Votes | % |
|---|---|---|---|
| Lee Won-jong (incumbent) | Grand National Party | 343,546 | 58.60 |
| Koo Chun-suh | United Liberal Democrats | 196,253 | 33.48 |
| Chang Han-ryang | Independent | 46,459 | 7.92 |
| Total | | 586,258 | 100.00 |
| Valid votes | | 586,258 | 97.62 |
| Invalid/blank votes | | 14,292 | 2.38 |
| Total votes | | 600,550 | 100.00 |
| Registered voters/turnout | | 1,076,451 | 55.79 |
| Grand National hold | | | |
Source: National Election Commission

=== South Chungcheong ===
| Candidate | Party | Votes | % |
|---|---|---|---|
| Sim Dae-pyung (incumbent) | United Liberal Democrats | 508,796 | 66.96 |
| Park Tae-kwon | Grand National Party | 251,005 | 33.04 |
| Total | | 759,801 | 100.00 |
| Valid votes | | 759,801 | 96.70 |
| Invalid/blank votes | | 25,941 | 3.30 |
| Total votes | | 785,742 | 100.00 |
| Registered voters/turnout | | 1,397,105 | 56.24 |
| United Liberal Democrats hold | | | |
Source: National Election Commission

=== North Jeolla ===
| Candidate | Party | Votes | % |
|---|---|---|---|
| Kang Hyun-wook | Millennium Democratic Party | 571,650 | 74.57 |
| Son Ju-hang | Independent | 131,320 | 17.13 |
| Ra Kyung-kyun | Grand National Party | 63,661 | 8.30 |
| Total | | 766,631 | 100.00 |
| Valid votes | | 766,631 | 97.40 |
| Invalid/blank votes | | 20,504 | 2.60 |
| Total votes | | 787,135 | 100.00 |
| Registered voters/turnout | | 1,431,722 | 54.98 |
| Millennium Democratic hold | | | |
Source: National Election Commission

=== South Jeolla ===
| Candidate | Party | Votes | % |
|---|---|---|---|
| Park Tae-young | Millennium Democratic Party | 563,545 | 57.77 |
| Song Jae-gu | Independent | 236,558 | 24.25 |
| Song Ha-sung | Independent | 89,487 | 9.17 |
| Hwang Soo-youn | Grand National Party | 51,504 | 5.28 |
| Ahn Su-won | Independent | 34,439 | 3.53 |
| Total | | 975,533 | 100.00 |
| Valid votes | | 975,533 | 96.96 |
| Invalid/blank votes | | 30,615 | 3.04 |
| Total votes | | 1,006,148 | 100.00 |
| Registered voters/turnout | | 1,533,059 | 65.63 |
| Millennium Democratic hold | | | |
Source: National Election Commission

=== North Gyeongsang ===
| Candidate | Party | Votes | % |
|---|---|---|---|
| Lee Eui-geun (incumbent) | Grand National Party | 1,028,080 | 85.49 |
| Cho Young-gun | Independent | 174,472 | 14.51 |
| Total | | 1,202,552 | 100.00 |
| Valid votes | | 1,202,552 | 97.44 |
| Invalid/blank votes | | 31,543 | 2.56 |
| Total votes | | 1,234,095 | 100.00 |
| Registered voters/turnout | | 2,044,215 | 60.37 |
| Grand National hold | | | |
Source: National Election Commission

=== South Gyeongsang ===
| Candidate | Party | Votes | % |
|---|---|---|---|
| Kim Hyuk-kyu (incumbent) | Grand National Party | 920,706 | 74.51 |
| Kim Doo-kwan | Millennium Democratic Party | 208,641 | 16.88 |
| Lim Su-tae | Democratic Labor Party | 106,367 | 8.61 |
| Total | | 1,235,714 | 100.00 |
| Valid votes | | 1,235,714 | 98.14 |
| Invalid/blank votes | | 23,428 | 1.86 |
| Total votes | | 1,259,142 | 100.00 |
| Registered voters/turnout | | 2,227,548 | 56.53 |
| Grand National hold | | | |
Source: National Election Commission

=== Jeju ===
| Candidate | Party | Votes | % |
|---|---|---|---|
| Woo Geun-min (incumbent) | Millennium Democratic Party | 135,283 | 51.41 |
| Shin Koo-bum | Grand National Party | 119,502 | 45.41 |
| Shin Doo-wan | Democratic People's Party | 8,373 | 3.18 |
| Total | | 263,158 | 100.00 |
| Valid votes | | 263,158 | 98.38 |
| Invalid/blank votes | | 4,321 | 1.62 |
| Total votes | | 267,479 | 100.00 |
| Registered voters/turnout | | 387,982 | 68.94 |
| Millennium Democratic hold | | | |
Source: National Election Commission

== Regional council elections ==
| Party | Proportional | | | Constituency | | | Total seats | +/– |
| Party | Votes | % | Seats | Votes | % | Seats | Total seats | +/– |
|---|---|---|---|---|---|---|---|---|
| Grand National Party | 8,595,174 | 52.15 | 36 | 7,361,170 | 47.58 | 431 | 467 | +214 |
| Millennium Democratic Party | 4,796,391 | 29.10 | 22 | 4,695,425 | 30.35 | 121 | 143 | –160 |
| United Liberal Democrats | 1,340,376 | 8.13 | 4 | 393,188 | 2.54 | 29 | 33 | –62 |
| Democratic Labor Party | 1,072,782 | 6.51 | 9 | 563,877 | 3.64 | 2 | 11 | New |
| Korean Coalition for the Future | 184,261 | 1.12 | 2 | 46,491 | 0.30 | 0 | 2 | New |
| Other parties | 493,575 | 2.99 | 0 | 38,399 | 0.25 | 0 | 0 | – |
| Independents | | | | 2,372,965 | 15.34 | 26 | 26 | –13 |
| Total | 16,482,559 | 100.00 | 73 | 15,471,515 | 100.00 | 609 | 682 | –8 |
Source: NEC, CLAIR

=== Results by province or city ===
| Province/City | Seats | GNP | MDP | ULD | DLP | KCF | IND |
|---|---|---|---|---|---|---|---|
| Seoul | 102 | 87 | 14 | | 1 | | |
| Busan | 44 | 42 | 1 | | 1 | | |
| Daegu | 27 | 26 | | | | 1 | |
| Incheon | 29 | 25 | 3 | | | | 1 |
| Gwangju | 19 | | 18 | | 1 | | |
| Daejeon | 19 | 9 | 1 | 9 | | | |
| Ulsan | 19 | 15 | | | 3 | | 1 |
| Gyeonggi | 104 | 90 | 10 | | 1 | | 3 |
| Gangwon | 43 | 33 | 7 | | 1 | | 2 |
| North Chungcheong | 27 | 21 | 1 | 3 | | | 2 |
| South Chungcheong | 36 | 8 | 4 | 21 | | | 3 |
| North Jeolla | 36 | 1 | 29 | | 1 | | 5 |
| South Jeolla | 51 | 1 | 47 | | 1 | | 2 |
| North Gyeongsang | 57 | 51 | 1 | | | 1 | 4 |
| South Gyeongsang | 50 | 47 | 1 | | 1 | | 1 |
| Jeju | 19 | 11 | 6 | | | | 2 |
| Total | 682 | 467 | 143 | 33 | 11 | 2 | 26 |
Source: NEC, CLAIR

=== Constituency seats ===
| Province/City | Seats | GNP | MDP | ULD | DLP | IND |
|---|---|---|---|---|---|---|
| Seoul | 92 | 82 | 10 | | | |
| Busan | 40 | 40 | | | | |
| Daegu | 24 | 24 | | | | |
| Incheon | 26 | 23 | 2 | | | 1 |
| Gwangju | 16 | | 16 | | | |
| Daejeon | 16 | 8 | | 8 | | |
| Ulsan | 16 | 13 | | | 2 | 1 |
| Gyeonggi | 94 | 84 | 7 | | | 3 |
| Gangwon | 39 | 31 | 6 | | | 2 |
| North Chungcheong | 24 | 19 | 1 | 2 | | 2 |
| South Chungcheong | 32 | 7 | 3 | 19 | | 3 |
| North Jeolla | 32 | | 27 | | | 5 |
| South Jeolla | 46 | | 44 | | | 2 |
| North Gyeongsang | 51 | 47 | | | | 4 |
| South Gyeongsang | 45 | 44 | | | | 1 |
| Jeju | 16 | 9 | 5 | | | 2 |
| Total | 609 | 431 | 121 | 29 | 2 | 26 |
Source: NEC, CLAIR

=== Proportional representation seats ===
| Province/City | Seats | GNP | MDP | DLP | ULD | KCF |
|---|---|---|---|---|---|---|
| Seoul | 10 | 5 | 4 | 1 | | |
| Busan | 4 | 2 | 1 | 1 | | |
| Daegu | 3 | 2 | | | | 1 |
| Incheon | 3 | 2 | 1 | | | |
| Gwangju | 3 | | 2 | 1 | | |
| Daejeon | 3 | 1 | 1 | | 1 | |
| Ulsan | 3 | 2 | | 1 | | |
| Gyeonggi | 10 | 6 | 3 | 1 | | |
| Gangwon | 4 | 2 | 1 | 1 | | |
| North Chungcheong | 3 | 2 | | | 1 | |
| South Chungcheong | 4 | 1 | 1 | | 2 | |
| North Jeolla | 4 | 1 | 2 | 1 | | |
| South Jeolla | 5 | 1 | 3 | 1 | | |
| North Gyeongsang | 6 | 4 | 1 | | | 1 |
| South Gyeongsang | 5 | 3 | 1 | 1 | | |
| Jeju | 3 | 2 | 1 | | | |
| Total | 73 | 36 | 22 | 9 | 4 | 2 |
Source: NEC, CLAIR

== Municipal mayoral elections ==
=== Summary ===
| Party | Seats | +/– |
|---|---|---|
| Grand National Party | 140 | +66 |
| Millennium Democratic Party | 44 | –40 |
| United Liberal Democrats | 16 | –13 |
| Democratic Labor Party | 2 | New |
| Independents | 30 | –14 |
| Total | 232 | 0 |
Source: NEC, CLAIR

=== Results by province or city ===
| Province/City | Mayors | GNP | MDP | ULD | DLP | IND |
|---|---|---|---|---|---|---|
| Seoul | 25 | 22 | 3 | | | |
| Busan | 16 | 13 | | | | 3 |
| Daegu | 8 | 8 | | | | |
| Incheon | 10 | 8 | 2 | | | |
| Gwangju | 5 | | 4 | | | 1 |
| Daejeon | 5 | | | 5 | | |
| Ulsan | 5 | 3 | | | 2 | |
| Gyeonggi | 31 | 24 | 4 | 1 | | 2 |
| Gangwon | 18 | 15 | 2 | | | 1 |
| North Chungcheong | 11 | 5 | 1 | 3 | | 2 |
| South Chungcheong | 15 | 4 | 2 | 7 | | 2 |
| North Jeolla | 14 | | 9 | | | 5 |
| South Jeolla | 22 | | 16 | | | 6 |
| North Gyeongsang | 23 | 21 | | | | 2 |
| South Gyeongsang | 20 | 16 | | | | 4 |
| Jeju | 4 | 1 | 1 | | | 2 |
| Total | 232 | 140 | 44 | 16 | 2 | 30 |
Source: NEC, CLAIR

== Municipal council elections ==
3,459 seats in municipal councils were contested by candidates running as independents.

=== Seats by province or city ===
| Province/City | Seats |
|---|---|
| Seoul | 513 |
| Busan | 215 |
| Daegu | 140 |
| Incheon | 131 |
| Gwangju | 84 |
| Daejeon | 75 |
| Ulsan | 59 |
| Gyeonggi | 500 |
| Gangwon | 190 |
| North Chungcheong | 150 |
| South Chungcheong | 209 |
| North Jeolla | 237 |
| South Jeolla | 291 |
| North Gyeongsang | 339 |
| South Gyeongsang | 314 |
| Jeju | 38 |
| Total | 3,485 |
Source: National Election Commission
