= 1997 South Korean presidential election =

- 18 December 1997
- Registered: 32,290,416
- Turnout: 80.65% (▼1.24pp)
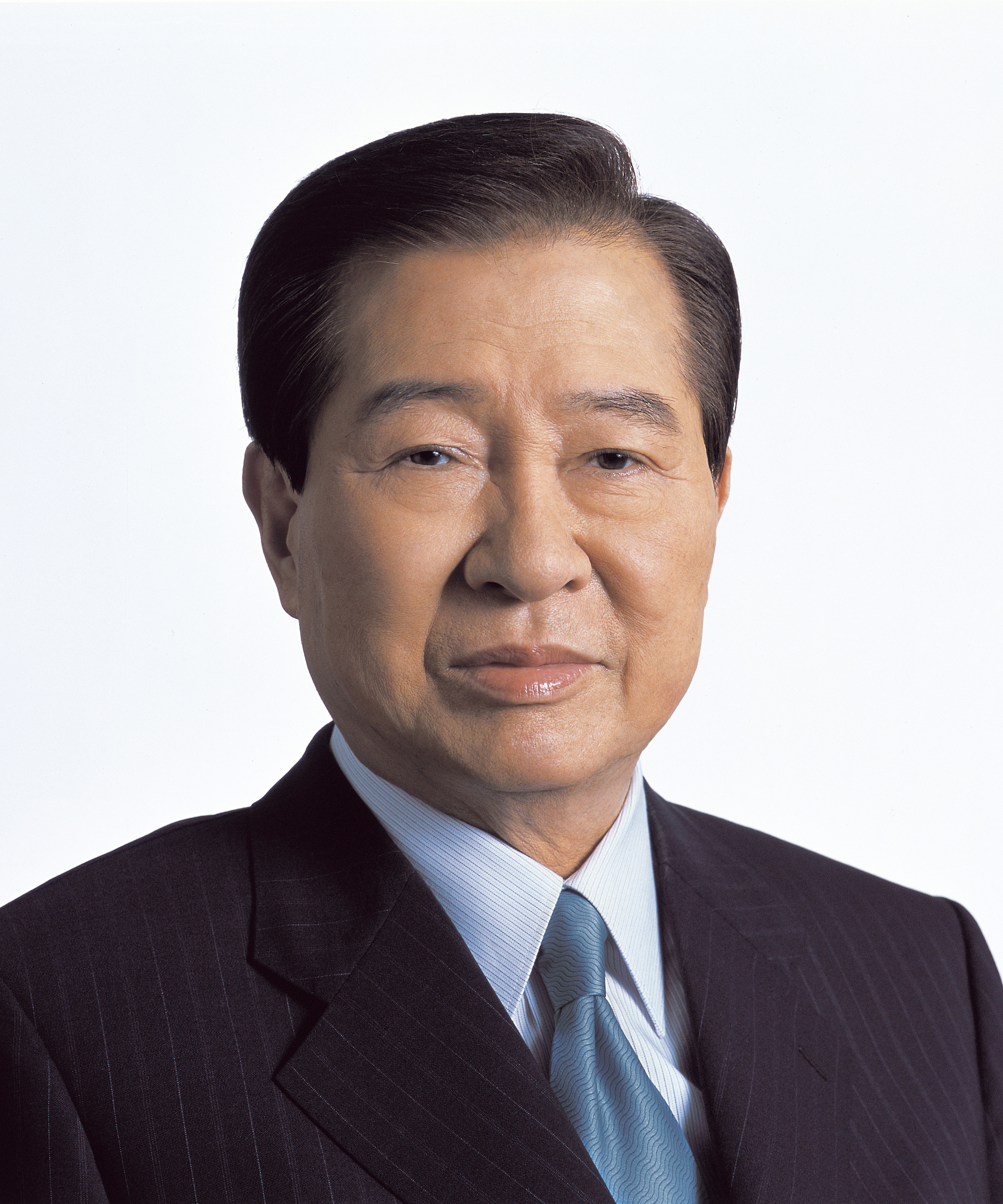

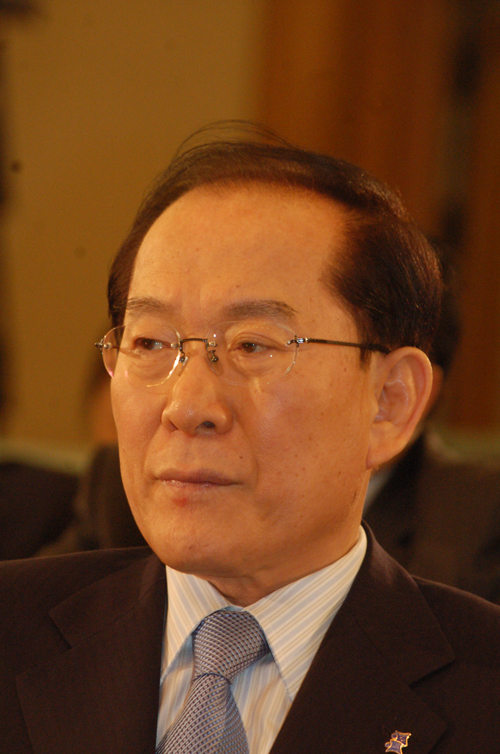

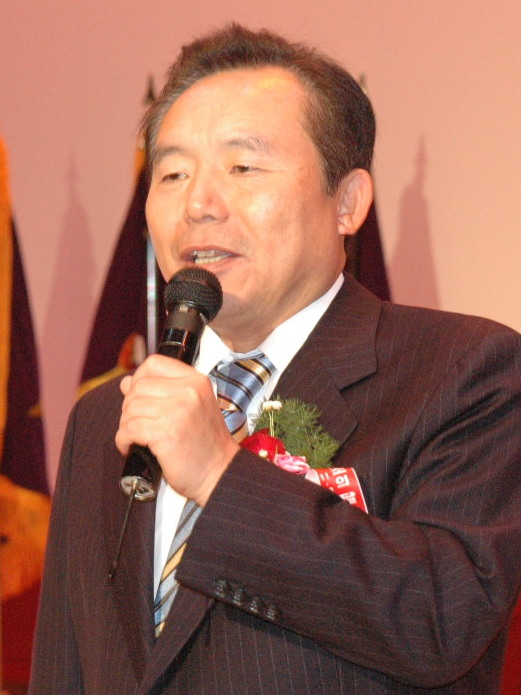
Nominee	Kim Dae-jung	Lee Hoi-chang	Lee In-je
Party	National Congress	Grand National	New National
Popular vote	10,326,275	9,935,718	4,925,591
Percentage	40.27%	38.75%	19.21%
President before election
Kim Young-sam
Independent
Elected President
Kim Dae-jung
National Congress

Presidential elections were held in South Korea on 18 December 1997. The result was a victory for opposition candidate Kim Dae-jung, who won with 40% of the vote. When he took office in 1998, it marked the first time in Korean history that the ruling party peacefully transferred power to the opposition party.

== Nominations ==
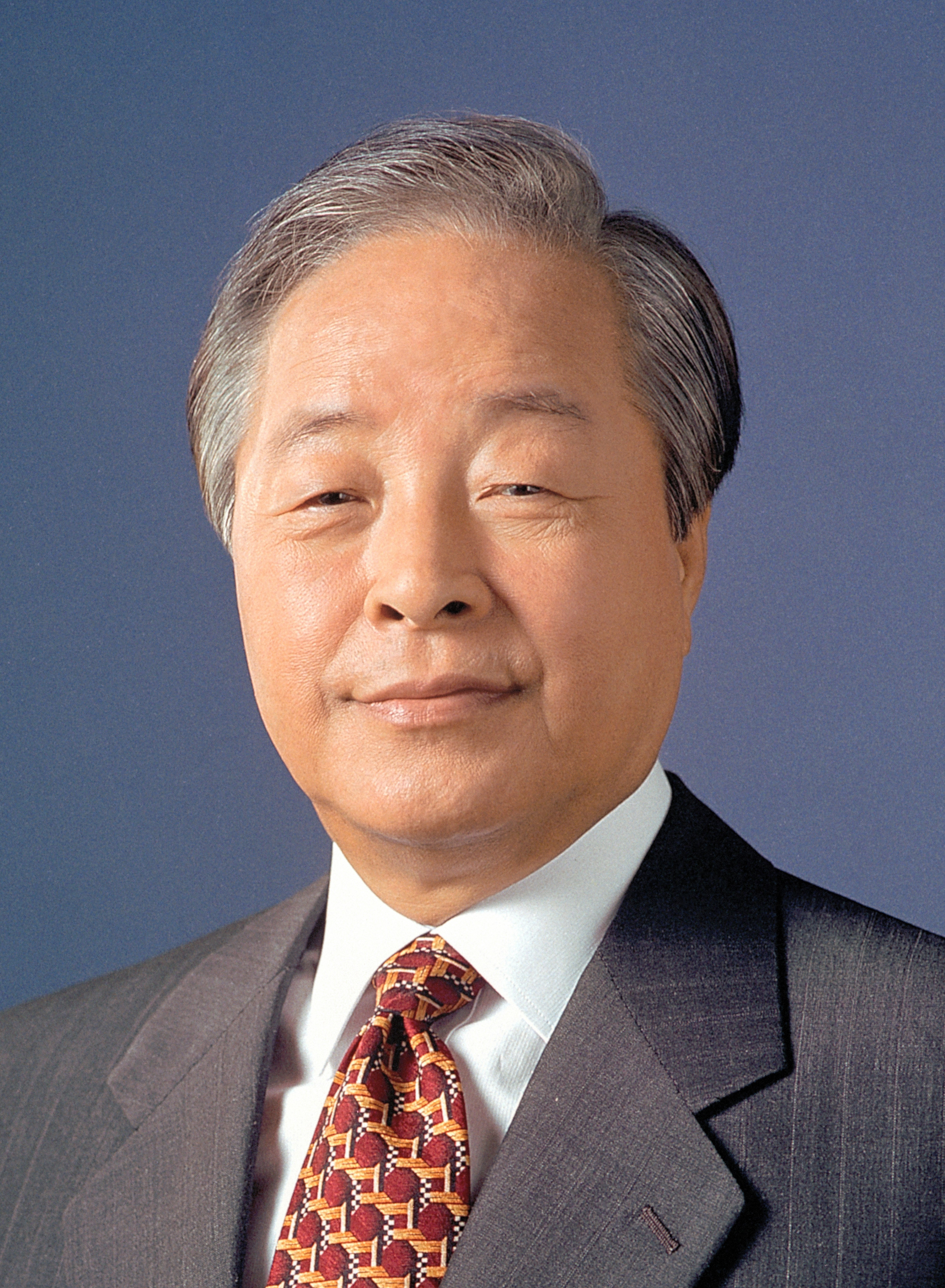
The incumbent in 1997, Kim Young-sam. His term expired on 25 February 1998.

=== National Congress for New Politics ===
The NCNP National Convention was held on 19 May at Olympic Gymnastics Arena. Kim Dae-jung, a former 6-term lawmaker from South Jeolla, was nominated for president, defeating Chyung Dai-chul, a former four-term lawmaker from Seoul.

Candidate	Delegates	%
Kim Dae-jung	3,223	78.04
Chyung Dai-chul	907	21.96
Total	4,130	100.00
Valid votes	4,130	99.35
Invalid/blank votes	27	0.65
Total votes	4,157	100.00

=== New Korea Party ===
The ruling New Korea Party's presidential nominating convention took place on 21 July at Olympic Gymnastics Arena, during which former Prime Minister Lee Hoi-chang defeated former Governor of Gyeonggi Lee In-je after two rounds of voting and became the party's nominee.

Candidate	First round		Second round	
Candidate	Delegates	%	Delegates	%
Lee Hoi-chang	4,963	41.13	6,922	59.96
Lee In-je	1,776	14.72	4,622	40.04
Lee Han-dong	1,771	14.68		
Kim Deok-ryong	1,674	13.87		
Lee Soo-sung	1,648	13.66		
Choi Byung-ryeol	236	1.96		
Total	12,068	100.00	11,544	100.00

=== United Liberal Democrats ===
The ULD National Convention held on 24 June at Olympic Gymnastics Arena overwhelmingly nominated 8-term lawmaker Kim Jong-pil from South Chungcheong for president.

Candidate	Delegates	%
Kim Jong-pil	2,575	82.29
Han Young-soo	554	17.71
Total	3,129	100.00

=== Democratic Party ===
On 11 September, the Democratic Party, once the premier opposition to the New Koreans but a fringe party ever since the defection of Kim Dae-jung's faction in 1995, nominated former Mayor of Seoul Cho Soon for president.

=== New National Party ===
On 4 November, former NKP politicians unhappy with Lee Hoi-chang founded the New National Party and nominated Lee In-je for president. This was after the scandal regarding Lee Hoi-chang's sons being excused from the military service hit the news cycle and brought Lee's popularity down.

== Campaign ==
Early polls showed Lee Hoi-chang leading Kim Dae-jung by as much as 30 percentage points.

Lee Hoi-chang's lead was lost when press reports emerged that Lee's two sons had evaded military conscription by shedding weight before their physical examinations. The South Korean public tends to be intolerant towards men who attempt to evade mandatory military service or receive special treatment. Lee In-je then launched his own bid for the presidency, claiming that Lee Hoi-chang could not win the election and stood for a generational shift in South Korean politics as he was 20 years younger than any candidate in the race. These developments led to Kim leading in the polls by a slender margin.

The election also took place in the context of the IMF crisis where South Korea was forced to accept an IMF bailout on 3 December amidst an economic crash.

=== Kim Dae-jung and Kim Jong-pil form an alliance ===
Kim Dae-jung, or "D.J." and Kim Jong-pil, or "J.P." agreed on 3 November to form an alliance against their common enemy, Lee Hoi-chang. In this agreement, JP announced to withdraw his bid for president to endorse DJ, and in turn DJ would appoint JP as the prime minister once elected president. The two Kims also agreed to revise the Constitution after the election from presidential system to parliamentary system, and the NCNP and ULD would cooperate on different issues as a coalition government. Kim Dae-jung shocked his supporters by joining ticket with Kim Jong-pil, a prominent figure within Park Chung-hee’s authoritarian regime during the 1960s and 70s. The Park regime had targeted Kim Dae-jung as a political dissident with assassination attempts and imprisonment.

=== Anti-Kim Coalition: the Grand National Party ===
On the other hand, needing a breakthrough as Kim Dae-jung's popularity soared, Lee Hoi-chang and Cho Soon also agreed to combine forces. On 21 November, the New Korea Party and Democratic Party merged into one party, and was founded as the Grand National Party. Cho Soon was made the chairman of the party, and Lee Hoi-chang the candidate for president.

The election was also the first to feature election debates between the candidates.

== Results ==
With a winning margin of 1.52%, the 1997 presidential elections were the closest until the 2022 presidential elections.

Candidate	Party	Votes	%
Kim Dae-jung	National Congress for New Politics	10,326,275	40.27
Lee Hoi-chang	Grand National Party	9,935,718	38.75
Lee In-je	New National Party	4,925,591	19.21
Kwon Young-ghil	People's Victory for 21st Century	306,026	1.19
Shin Jeong Yil	Unified Korea Party	61,056	0.24
Kim Han-sik	Honest Politics Unite	48,717	0.19
Huh Kyung-young	Republican Party	39,055	0.15
Total		25,642,438	100.00
Valid votes		25,642,438	98.46
Invalid/blank votes		400,195	1.54
Total votes		26,042,633	100.00
Registered voters/turnout		32,290,416	80.65
Source: Nohlen et al.

=== By province and city ===
Province/City	Kim Dae-jung		Lee Hoi-chang		Lee In-je		Kwon Young-ghil		Shin Jeong-yil		Kim Han-sik		Huh Kyung-young	
Province/City	Votes	%	Votes	%	Votes	%	Votes	%	Votes	%	Votes	%	Votes	%
Seoul	2,627,308	44.87	2,394,309	40.89	747,856	12.77	65,656	1.12	5,234	0.09	8,978	0.15	5,432	0.09
Busan	320,178	15.29	1,117,069	53.34	623,756	29.78	25,581	1.22	3,359	0.16	2,211	0.11	2,252	0.11
Daegu	166,576	12.53	965,607	72.65	173,649	13.07	16,258	1.22	4,108	0.31	1,229	0.09	1,661	0.12
Incheon	497,839	38.51	470,560	36.40	297,739	23.03	20,340	1.57	1,862	0.14	2,356	0.18	1,915	0.15
Gwangju	754,159	97.29	13,294	1.71	5,181	0.67	1,478	0.19	273	0.04	660	0.09	154	0.02
Daejeon	307,493	45.03	199,266	29.18	164,374	24.07	8,444	1.24	936	0.14	1,352	0.20	1,028	0.15
Ulsan	80,751	15.42	268,998	51.36	139,824	26.70	32,145	6.14	991	0.19	427	0.08	627	0.12
Gyeonggi	1,781,577	39.28	1,612,108	35.54	1,071,704	23.63	47,608	1.05	7,415	0.16	8,035	0.18	7,077	0.16
Gangwon	197,438	23.76	358,921	43.19	257,140	30.95	8,231	0.99	4,161	0.50	1,851	0.22	3,201	0.39
North Chungcheong	295,666	37.43	243,210	30.79	232,254	29.41	10,232	1.30	3,357	0.43	2,313	0.29	2,784	0.35
South Chungcheong	483,093	48.25	235,457	23.52	261,802	26.15	9,604	0.96	4,122	0.41	4,109	0.41	3,011	0.30
North Jeolla	1,078,957	92.28	53,114	4.54	25,037	2.14	4,189	0.36	1,968	0.17	4,981	0.43	943	0.08
South Jeolla	1,231,726	94.61	41,534	3.19	18,305	1.41	2,199	0.17	2,255	0.17	4,790	0.37	1,027	0.08
North Gyeongsang	210,403	13.67	953,360	61.92	335,087	21.76	22,382	1.45	11,723	0.76	2,476	0.16	4,177	0.27
South Gyeongsang	182,102	11.05	908,808	55.15	515,869	31.30	27,823	1.69	8,047	0.49	2,150	0.13	3,215	0.20
Jeju	111,009	40.58	100,103	36.59	56,014	20.47	3,856	1.41	1,245	0.46	799	0.29	551	0.20
Total	10,326,275	40.27	9,935,718	38.75	4,925,591	19.21	306,026	1.19	61,056	0.24	48,717	0.19	39,055	0.15

== See also ==
- X-file scandal
