= New National Party (South Korea) =

1997–1998 political party in South Korea

New National Party 국민신당
- Leader: Lee Man-seop
- Founder: Lee Man-seop; Lee In-je
- Founded: November 4, 1997
- Dissolved: September 28, 1998
- Split from: New Korea Party; Democratic Party
- Merged into: National Congress for New Politics
- Succeeded by: United Liberal Democrats (Kim Hak-won and others); Democratic People's Party (Park Chan-jong)
- Headquarters: Yeouido, Yeongdeungpo-gu, Seoul
- Membership: 108,573
- Ideology: Neoliberalism
- Political position: Centre-right to right-wing
- Colours: Turquoise; Blue
- National Assembly: 7 / 299
- Metropolitan Mayors and Governors: 0 / 16
- Head of local government: 1 / 232

Korean name
- Hangul: 국민신당
- Hanja: 國民新黨
- RR: Gungmin sindang
- MR: Kungmin sindang

The New National Party (Korean: 국민신당) was a neoliberal party in South Korea that existed from 4 November 1997 to 28 September 1998.

Led by Lee In-je, who had lost the New Korea Party's presidential nomination race to Lee Hoi-chang, the party was founded on 4 November 1997, with Lee Man-seop as party president and Lee In-je as its presidential candidate; figures such as Seo Seok-jae, Won Yoo-chul and Park Chan-jong, who had defected from the New Korea Party, joined the new party. However, Lee In-je finished third in the 1997 South Korean presidential election. In the 1998 South Korean local elections, Jeon Il-sun was elected as mayor of Nonsan, but he lost his office in 2000 due to a violation of election laws.

The New National Party merged with the National Congress for New Politics on 28 September 1998. At this time, Lee Man-seop, Lee In-je, Seo Seok-jae and Won Yoo-chul joined the party, while Kim Hak-won and others joined the United Liberal Democrats individually.

== History ==
When the New National Party was being founded, the party name was selected through a public contest conducted via channels. Although other names were proposed, they were deemed either cliche or too similar to the National Congress for New Politics, the party led by Kim Dae-jung at the time. Ultimately, however, the name decided upon was "New National Party".

== Former leaders ==
No.	Former representative	Position	Term
1	Lee Man-seop	Chairman	4 November 1997 – 28 September 1998

== Election results ==
=== Presidential election ===
Year	Election	Candidate	Votes	Vote share	Result	Status
1997	15th	Lee In-je	4,925,591	19.20%	3rd	Lost

=== Local election ===
Year	Election	Metropolitan mayor/governor		Municipal head		Metropolitan council		Municipal council	
Year	Election	Elected	Seat share	Elected	Seat share	Elected	Seat share	Elected	Seat share
1998	2nd	0/16	0%	1/232	0.43%	0/616	0%	—	—

== Past national convention ==
=== Party Founding Convention ===
At its inaugural convention on 4 November 1997, the New National Party elected Lee Man-seop as its president and former Governor of Gyeonggi Province Lee In-je as its presidential candidate for the 1997 Presidential Election.

=== 1998 Extraordinary National Convention ===
The New National Party, having announced its merger with the National Congress for New Politics on 22 June 1998, held an extraordinary national convention on 28 June and resolved to dissolve the party effective 28 September 1998.

== See also ==
- Lee In-je
- List of political parties in South Korea
- Politics of South Korea
- New Korea Party
- Democratic Party (South Korea, 1995)
- Grand National Party
- National Congress for New Politics
- 1997 South Korean presidential election
- 1998 South Korean local elections
