= Joo Ho-young =

South Korean politician

The Honourable Joo Ho-young MP
- 주호영
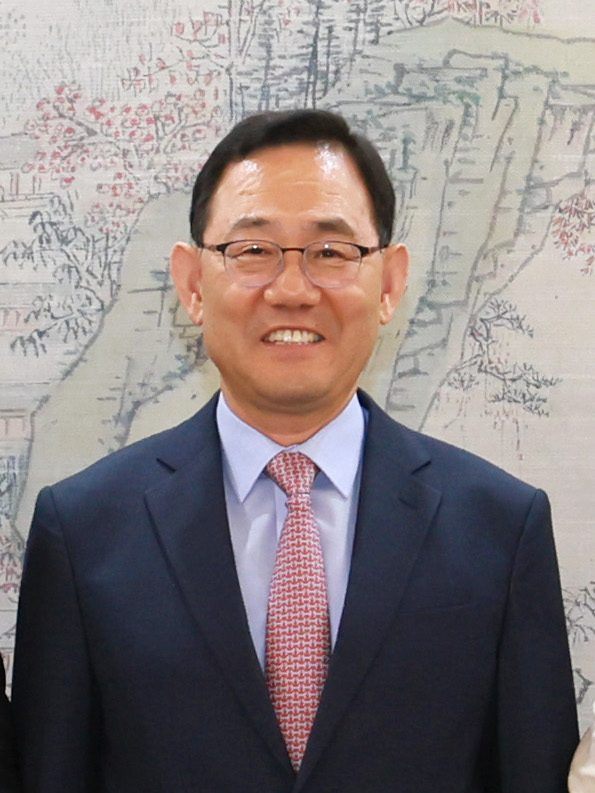
- Joo in 2024

Deputy Speaker of the National Assembly
- In office 27 June 2024 – 29 May 2026 Serving with Lee Hack-young
- Speaker: Woo Won-shik
- Preceded by: Chung Woo-taik
- Succeeded by: Park Duk-hyum

Member of the National Assembly
- Incumbent
- Assumed office 30 May 2020
- Preceded by: Kim Boo-kyum
- Constituency: Suseong A (Daegu)
- In office 30 May 2004 – 29 May 2020
- Preceded by: Yoon Young-tak
- Succeeded by: Hong Joon-pyo
- Constituency: Suseong B (Daegu)
Party leadership offices
Acting Leader of the People Power Party
In office 8 May 2020 – 22 May 2020
Preceded by	Shim Jae-chul (acting)
Succeeded by	Kim Chong-in (acting)
In office 8 April 2021 – 30 April 2021
Preceded by	Kim Chong-in (acting)
Succeeded by	Kim Gi-hyeon (acting)
In office 9 August 2022 – 26 August 2022
Preceded by	Kweon Seong-dong (acting)
Succeeded by	Kweon Seong-dong (acting)
Floor Leader of the People Power Party
In office 19 September 2022 – 7 April 2023
Preceded by	Kweon Seong-dong
Succeeded by	Yoon Jae-ok
In office 8 May 2020 – 30 April 2021
Preceded by	Shim Jae-chul
Succeeded by	Kim Gi-hyeon
Acting Leader of the Bareun Party
In office 10 March 2017 – 25 June 2017
Preceded by	Choung Byoung-gug
Succeeded by	Lee Hye-hoon
In office 7 September 2017 – 13 November 2017
Preceded by	Lee Hye-hoon
Succeeded by	Yoo Seong-min

Minister of Special Affairs
- In office 30 September 2009 – 30 August 2010
- President: Lee Myung-bak
- Succeeded by: Lee Jae-oh

Personal details
- Born: 8 January 1960 (age 66) Uljin, North Gyeongsang, South Korea
- Party: People Power
- Other political affiliations: LKP (2004–2016, 2017–2020); Bareun (2017)
- Spouse: Kim Sun-hui
- Children: 2
- Parent: Joo Koo-won (d. 2020)
- Occupation: Judge, politician

Joo Ho-young (Korean: 주호영, born 8 January 1960) is a South Korean judge and politician who served as the Deputy Speaker of the National Assembly from 2024 to 2026. A member of the People Power Party (PPP), he has been a member of the National Assembly since 2004, representing Daegu Suseong B from 2004 to 2020 and Daegu Suseong A since 2020.

Before entering party leadership, Joo worked as a judge in the South Korean court system. He entered politics with his election to the National Assembly in 2004 and later served in the cabinet of President Lee Myung-bak as the minister of special affairs from 2009 to 2010.

Throughout his legislative career, Joo has held a variety of leadership roles across the conservative block. He served as the acting leader of the Bareun Party during two intervals in 2017. Within the PPP, Joo served as the floor leader from 2020 to 2021 and again from 2022 to 2023. He was also the party's acting leader on three separate occasions in 2020, 2021, and 2022.

== Early life and education ==
Born in Uljin, Joo attended to Neungin High School. He studied law in Yeungnam University.

== Career ==
After qualifying for the bar in 1982, Joo worked as a judge for 19 years. In 1992, when he was a judge, in the Korean Air Flight 376 gear-up landing case, which occurred in 1991, he said in a trial ruling held in January of the following year, "The heavy responsibility of punishment under the criminal law is inevitable that defendants who are tasked with safe transportation of passengers did not follow basic air operation rules and caused an accident that could kill all 120 passengers."

He was firstly elected to the National Assembly in 2004 election. He served as the parliamentary leader of the Grand National Party (GNP) from 2006 to 2007. Following his re-election in 2008 election, he was appointed the Minister for Special Affairs.

On 18 July 2016, Joo announced he would run as the party chairperson for the upcoming leadership election. He lost to Lee Jung-hyun.

Following the political scandal, Joo left the Saenuri Party along with other dissidents. He was elected the parliamentary leader of the newly formed Bareun Party but in November 2017, he announced his departure in order to join the Liberty Korea Party (LKP) along with other 8 MPs. He, however, remained till his term as a parliamentary leader ended.

In the 2020 election, Joo switched to Suseong 1st constituency, where the incumbent is Kim Boo-kyum (Democratic Party). He defeated the Democratic candidate and the former Minister of the Interior and Safety. He is now considered as a potential candidate for the President of the United Future Party (UFP), following the resignation of Hwang Kyo-ahn due to the election suffer.

On 4 May 2020, Joo launched his bid for the UFP's parliamentary leader. 4 days later, he was elected the parliamentary leader of the UFP, as well as the party's interim President where the position has been vacant since 15 April.

On 15 June, Joo announced his resignation as the UFP parliamentary leader following the Democratic Party's decision to take 6 parliamentary committees without dividing with opposition parties. He harshly criticised that the ruling Democratic Party is going to the one-party dictatorship. However, sources reported that almost all UFP MPs oppose his resignation.

Following the party's landslide victory in the 2021 by-elections, Joo returned as the party President. He has announced his intention to resign as the parliamentary leader on 16 April, adding that he would not serve until his term finishes on 29 May, but until the new person is elected.

On 10 May 2021, Joo announced his bid for the June 2021 leadership election. He would lose the election to Lee Jun-seok.

== Personal life ==
He is married to Kim Sun-hui and has 2 sons. He is a Buddhist.

His father, Joo Koo-won, died on 9 May 2020, the day after his election as the UFP parliamentary leader.

On 13 March 1998, Joo suffered a skull fracture from a traffic collision. He barely survived following a 13-hour surgery.

== Election results ==
Year	Elections	Constituency	Political party	Votes (%)	Remarks
2004	17th National Assembly General Election	Suseong B (Daegu)	GNP	62,627 (66.49%)	Won
2008	18th National Assembly General Election	Suseong B (Daegu)	GNP	46,131 (65.35%)	Won
2012	19th National Assembly General Election	Suseong B (Daegu)	Saenuri	50,953 (64.22%)	Won
2016	20th National Assembly General Election	Suseong B (Daegu)	Independent	42,386 (46.82%)	Won
2020	21st National Assembly General Election	Suseong A (Daegu)	UFP	92,018 (59.81%)	Won
2024	22nd National Assembly General Election	Suseong A (Daegu)	PPP	89,440 (65.63%)	Won
