= Mayor of Ulsan =

- 울산광역시장
- Seal of Ulsan

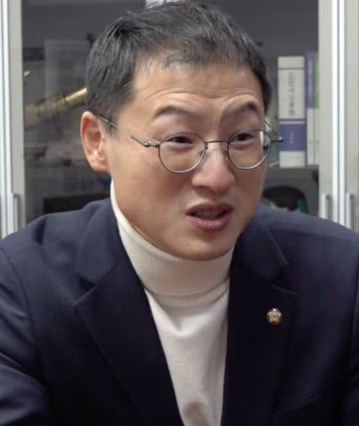
- Incumbent; King Sang-wook since 1 July 2026
- Term length: Four years
- Inaugural holder: Choi Dong-yong
- Formation: 24 October 1945; 80 years ago

The Mayor of Ulsan (Korean: 울산광역시장; Hanja: 蔚山廣域市長) is the head of the local government of Ulsan who is elected to a four-year term.

== List of mayors ==
=== Appointed mayors (before 1995) ===
From 1945 to 1995, the Mayor of Ulsan was appointed by the President of the Republic of Korea.

=== Directly elected mayors (1995–present) ===
Since 1995, under provisions of the revised Local Government Act, the Mayor of Ulsan is elected by direct election.

Political parties
Conservative
Liberal
Independent
Status
Denotes acting mayor

Term	Portrait	Name (Birth–Death)	Term of office			Political party	Elected
Term	Portrait	Name (Birth–Death)	Took office	Left office	Time in office	Political party	Elected
Ulsan, South Gyeongsang Province (1995–1997)
1st		Shim Wan-koo 심완구 沈完求 (1938–2020)	1 July 1995	14 July 1997	2 years, 14 days	Democratic Liberal → New Korea	1995
Ulsan (1997–present)
(1st)		Shim Wan-koo 심완구 沈完求 (1938–2020)	15 July 1997	26 June 2002	4 years, 347 days	New Korea → Grand National → National Congress → Millennium Democratic	(1995)
2nd		Shim Wan-koo 심완구 沈完求 (1938–2020)	15 July 1997	26 June 2002	4 years, 347 days	New Korea → Grand National → National Congress → Millennium Democratic	1998
3rd		Park Maeng-woo 박맹우 朴孟雨 (born 1951)	1 July 2002	31 March 2014	11 years, 274 days	Grand National → Saenuri	2002
4th		Park Maeng-woo 박맹우 朴孟雨 (born 1951)	1 July 2002	31 March 2014	11 years, 274 days	Grand National → Saenuri	2006
5th		Park Maeng-woo 박맹우 朴孟雨 (born 1951)	1 July 2002	31 March 2014	11 years, 274 days	Grand National → Saenuri	2010
5th		Park Sung-hwan 박성환 朴成換 (born 1956); Acting	1 April 2014	30 June 2014	91 days	Independent	—
6th		Kim Gi-hyeon 김기현 金起炫 (born 1959)	1 July 2014	30 June 2018	4 years, 0 days	Saenuri → Liberty Korea	2014
7th		Song Cheol-ho 송철호 宋哲鎬 (born 1949)	1 July 2018	30 June 2022	4 years, 0 days	Democratic	2018
8th		Kim Doo-gyum 김두겸 金斗謙 (born 1958)	1 July 2022	30 June 2026	4 years, 0 days	People Power	2022
9th		King Sang-wook 김상욱 金相旭 (born 1980)	1 July 2026	Incumbent	69 days	Democratic	2026

== Elections ==
=== 1995 (municipal) ===
1995 Ulsan mayoral election
Party	#	Candidate	Votes	Percentage
Democratic Liberal	1	Shim Wan-koo	122,326	30.43%
Democratic	2	Lee Kyu-chung	87,690	21.81%
Independent	4	Koh Won-joon	85,250	21.21%
Independent	5	Kim Myung-kyu	67,483	16.79%
Independent	3	Kang Chung-ho	27,259	6.78%
Independent	6	Kim Young-hae	7,719	1.92%
Independent	7	Yoon Byung-yi	4,165	1.03%
Total			401,892	100.00%
Voter turnout			67.58%	

=== 1998 ===
1998 Ulsan mayoral election
Party	#	Candidate	Votes	Percentage
Grand National	1	Shim Wan-koo	160,491	42.74%
Independent	5	Song Cheol-ho	148,126	39.44%
New National	4	Kang Chung-ho	37,139	9.89%
United Liberal Democrats	3	Cha Hwa-joon	29,725	7.91%
Total			375,481	100.00%
Voter turnout			57.58%	

=== 2002 ===
2002 Ulsan mayoral election
Party	#	Candidate	Votes	Percentage
Grand National	1	Park Maeng-woo	197,772	53.07%
Democratic Labor	3	Song Cheol-ho	162,546	43.61%
Socialist	4	Ahn Seung-chun	12,329	3.30%
Total			372,647	100.00%
Voter turnout			52.31%	

=== 2006 ===
2006 Ulsan mayoral election
Party	#	Candidate	Votes	Percentage
Grand National	2	Park Maeng-woo	261,361	63.23%
Democratic Labor	4	Noh Ok-hee	104,384	25.25%
Uri	1	Sim Kyu-myung	47,579	11.51%
Total			413,324	100.00%
Voter turnout			52.79%	

=== 2010 ===
2010 Ulsan mayoral election
Party	#	Candidate	Votes	Percentage
Grand National	1	Park Maeng-woo	279,421	61.26%
Democratic Labor	5	Kim Chang-hyun	133,437	29.25%
New Progressive	7	Noh Ok-hee	43,256	9.48%
Total			456,114	100.00%
Voter turnout			55.09%	

=== 2014 ===
2014 Ulsan mayoral election
Party	#	Candidate	Votes	Percentage
Saenuri	1	Kim Gi-hyeon	306,311	65.42%
Justice	4	Cho Seung-soo	123,736	26.43%
Labor	5	Lee Gap-yong	38,107	8.13%
Total			468,154	100.00%
Voter turnout			56.11%	

=== 2018 ===
2018 Ulsan mayoral election
Party	#	Candidate	Votes	Percentage
Democratic	1	Song Cheol-ho	317,341	52.88%
Liberty Korea	2	Kim Gi-hyeon	240,475	40.07%
Minjung	6	Kim Chang-hyun	28,621	4.76%
Bareunmirae	3	Lee Young-hee	13,589	2.26%
Total			600,026	100.00%
Voter turnout			64.79%	

=== 2022 ===
2022 Ulsan mayoral election
Party	#	Candidate	Votes	Percentage
People Power	2	Kim Doo-gyum	290,563	59.78%
Democratic	1	Song Cheol-ho	195,430	40.21%
Total			485,993	100.00%
Voter turnout			52.26%	

=== 2026 ===
Candidate	Party	Votes	%
Kim Sang-wook	Democratic Party	285,294	48.73
Kim Doo-gyeom (incumbent)	People Power Party	267,789	45.74
Park Maeng-woo	Independent	32,363	5.53
Total		585,446	100.00
Valid votes		585,446	97.59
Invalid/blank votes		14,444	2.41
Total votes		599,890	100.00
Registered voters/turnout		936,171	64.08
Democratic gain from People Power			

== See also ==
- Government of South Korea
- Politics of South Korea
