= 1998 South Korean local elections =

- 4 June 1998

16 regional heads 690 regional councilors 232 municipal mayors 3,490 municipal councilors
- Registered: 32,537,815
- Turnout: 17,155,577; 52.7% (▼15.7pp)
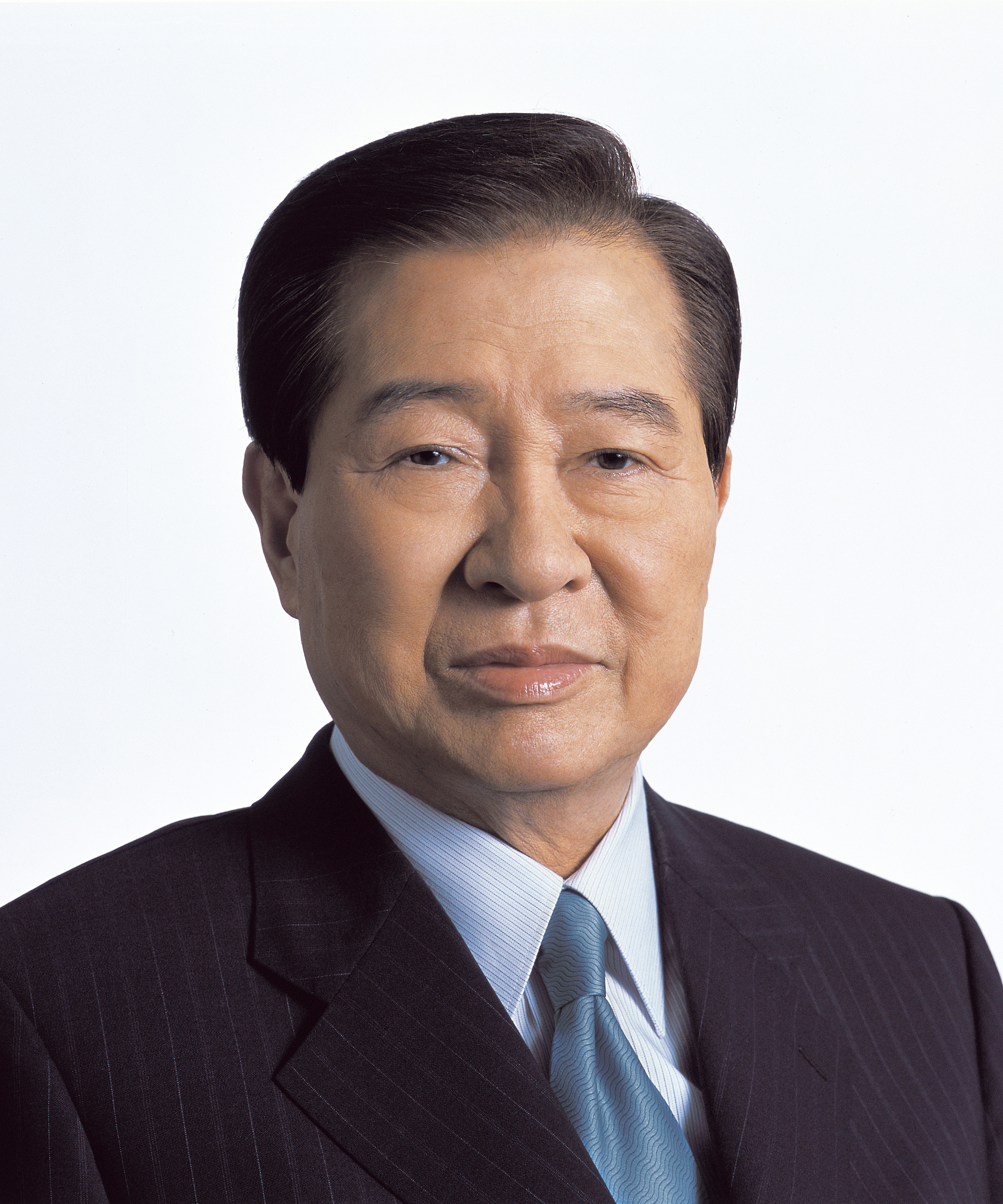

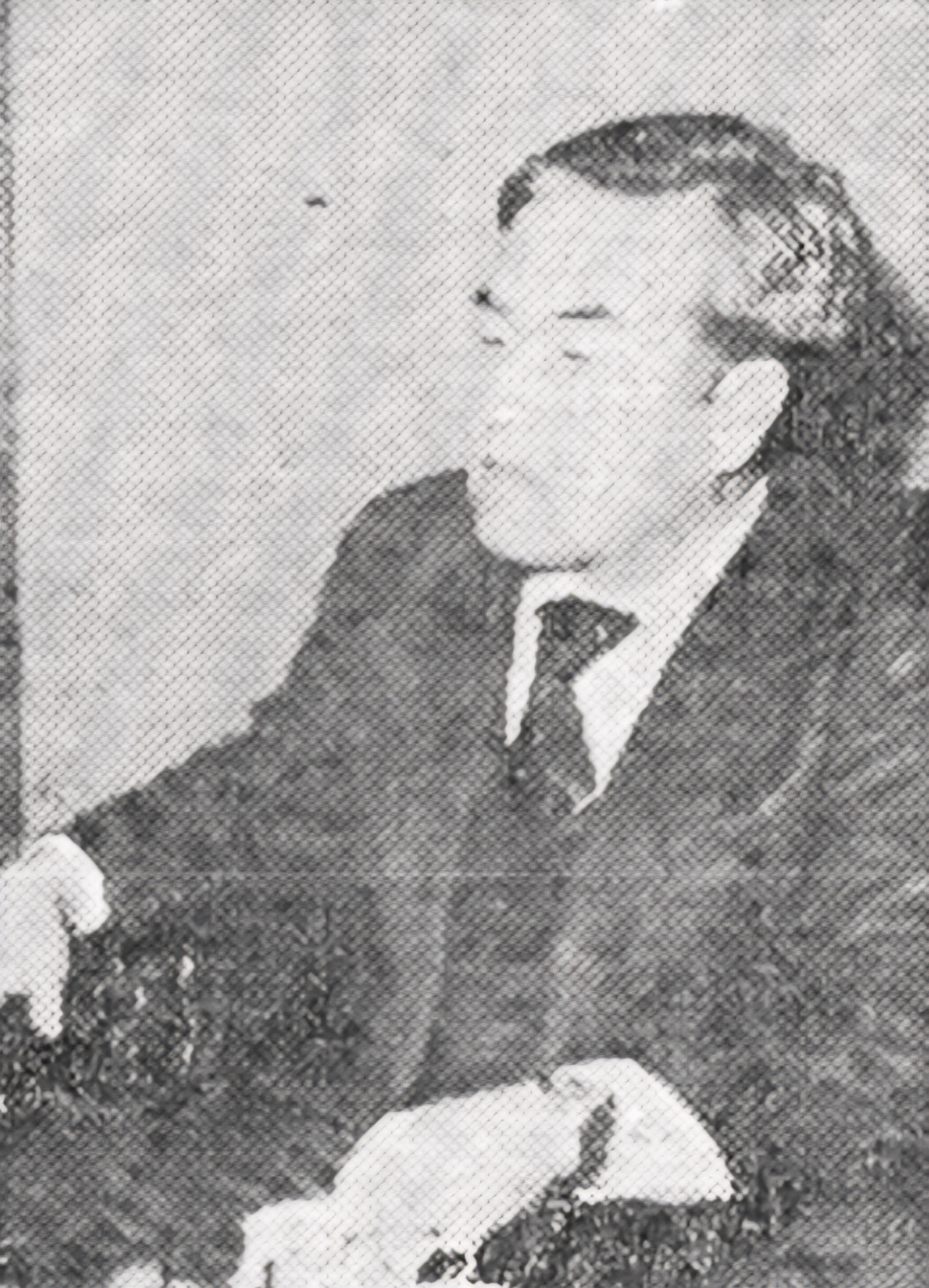

	First party	Second party	Third party
Leader	Kim Dae-jung	Cho Soon	Park Tae-joon
Party	National Congress	Grand National	ULD
Regional seats last election	Did not exist	9 heads 725 councilors	4 heads 94 councllors
Municipal seats last election	Did not exist	154 mayors	23 mayors
Regional seats won	6 heads 303 councilors	6 heads 253 councilors	4 heads 95 councilors
Regional seat change	New	▼3 heads ▼472 councilors	0 heads ▲1 councilor
Municipal seats won	84 mayors	74 mayors	29 mayors
Municipal seat change	New	▼80 mayors	▲6 mayors

The 2nd Local Elections were held in South Korea on 4 June 1998. A total of seven metropolitan city mayors, nine provincial governors, 680 regional councilors, 232 municipal mayors and 3,490 municipal councilors were elected.

== Regional head elections ==
=== Summary ===
Province/City	Head	Incumbent	Party	Elected	Party
Seoul	Mayor	Kang Deok-ki (acting)	Independent	Goh Kun	National Congress
Busan	Mayor	Moon Jung-soo	Grand National	Ahn Sang-yeong	Grand National
Daegu	Mayor	Moon Hee-gap	Grand National	Moon Hee-gap	Grand National
Incheon	Mayor	Choi Ki-sun	ULD	Choi Ki-sun	ULD
Gwangju	Mayor	Song Un-jong	National Congress	Goh Jae-yu	National Congress
Daejeon	Mayor	Hong Sun-ki	ULD	Hong Sun-ki	ULD
Ulsan	Mayor	Shim Wan-koo	Grand National	Shim Wan-koo	Grand National
Gyeonggi	Governor	Lim Su-bok (acting)	Independent	Lim Chang-yeol	National Congress
Gangwon	Governor	Choi Guk-gyu	Independent	Kim Jin-sun	Grand National
North Chungcheong	Governor	Ju Byeong-dok	Grand National	Lee Won-jong	ULD
South Chungcheong	Governor	Sim Dae-pyung	ULD	Sim Dae-pyung	ULD
North Jeolla	Governor	Yu Jong-geun	National Congress	Yu Jong-geun	National Congress
South Jeolla	Governor	Heo Kyeong-man	National Congress	Heo Kyeong-man	National Congress
North Gyeongsang	Governor	Lee Eui-geun	Grand National	Lee Eui-geun	Grand National
South Gyeongsang	Governor	Kim Hyuk-ku	Grand National	Kim Hyuk-ku	Grand National
Jeju	Governor	Shin Koo-bum	Independent	Woo Geun-min	National Congress

=== Seoul ===
Candidate	Party	Votes	%
Goh Kun	National Congress for New Politics	1,838,348	53.46
Choi Byung-ryul	Grand National Party	1,512,854	43.99
Lee Byung-ho	Independent	87,495	2.54
Total		3,438,697	100.00
Valid votes		3,438,697	98.90
Invalid/blank votes		38,408	1.10
Total votes		3,477,105	100.00
Registered voters/turnout		7,377,751	47.13
National Congress gain			
Source: National Election Commission

=== Busan ===
Candidate	Party	Votes	%
Ahn Sang-yeong	Grand National Party	558,909	45.14
Kim Ki-jae	Independent	537,983	43.45
Ha Il-min	National Congress for New Politics	141,172	11.40
Total		1,238,064	100.00
Valid votes		1,238,064	98.30
Invalid/blank votes		21,413	1.70
Total votes		1,259,477	100.00
Registered voters/turnout		2,699,499	46.66
Grand National hold			
Source: National Election Commission

=== Daegu ===
Candidate	Party	Votes	%
Moon Hee-gap (incumbent)	Grand National Party	570,167	71.99
Lee Eui-ik	United Liberal Democrats	163,653	20.66
Yoo Sung-hwan	New National Party	58,243	7.35
Total		792,063	100.00
Valid votes		792,063	98.59
Invalid/blank votes		11,300	1.41
Total votes		803,363	100.00
Registered voters/turnout		1,716,312	46.81
Grand National hold			
Source: National Election Commission

=== Incheon ===
Candidate	Party	Votes	%
Choi Ki-sun (incumbent)	United Liberal Democrats	375,051	53.50
Ahn Sang-soo	Grand National Party	238,708	34.05
Kim Yong-mo	New National Party	87,327	12.46
Total		701,086	100.00
Valid votes		701,086	97.79
Invalid/blank votes		15,837	2.21
Total votes		716,923	100.00
Registered voters/turnout		1,659,977	43.19
ULD hold			
Source: National Election Commission

=== Gwangju ===
Candidate	Party	Votes	%
Goh Jae-yu	National Congress for New Politics	261,578	67.21
Lee Seung-chae	Independent	127,626	32.79
Total		389,204	100.00
Valid votes		389,204	98.38
Invalid/blank votes		6,425	1.62
Total votes		395,629	100.00
Registered voters/turnout		877,868	45.07
National Congress hold			
Source: National Election Commission

=== Daejeon ===
Candidate	Party	Votes	%
Hong Sun-ki (incumbent)	United Liberal Democrats	286,255	73.69
Song Chun-young	New National Party	70,414	18.13
Cho Myung-hyun	Independent	31,796	8.19
Total		388,465	100.00
Valid votes		388,465	98.31
Invalid/blank votes		6,659	1.69
Total votes		395,124	100.00
Registered voters/turnout		888,968	44.45
ULD hold			
Source: National Election Commission

=== Ulsan ===
Candidate	Party	Votes	%
Shim Wan-koo (incumbent)	Grand National Party	160,491	42.74
Song Cheol-ho	Independent	148,126	39.45
Kang Chung-ho	New National Party	37,139	9.89
Cha Hwa-joon	United Liberal Democrats	29,725	7.92
Total		375,481	100.00
Valid votes		375,481	98.81
Invalid/blank votes		4,538	1.19
Total votes		380,019	100.00
Registered voters/turnout		659,965	57.58
Grand National hold			
Source: National Election Commission

=== Gyeonggi ===
Candidate	Party	Votes	%
Lim Chang-yeol	National Congress for New Politics	1,549,189	54.31
Sohn Hak-kyu	Grand National Party	1,303,340	45.69
Total		2,852,529	100.00
Valid votes		2,852,529	98.36
Invalid/blank votes		47,673	1.64
Total votes		2,900,202	100.00
Registered voters/turnout		5,800,425	50.00
National Congress gain			
Source: National Election Commission

=== Gangwon ===
Candidate	Party	Votes	%
Kim Jin-sun	Grand National Party	268,559	39.28
Han Ho-sun	United Liberal Democrats	231,376	33.84
Lee Sang-ryong	Independent	183,775	26.88
Total		683,710	100.00
Valid votes		683,710	97.85
Invalid/blank votes		14,995	2.15
Total votes		698,705	100.00
Registered voters/turnout		1,087,113	64.27
Grand National gain from Independent			
Source: National Election Commission

=== North Chungcheong ===
Candidate	Party	Votes	%
Lee Won-jong	United Liberal Democrats	451,533	74.14
Ju Byeong-deok (incumbent)	Grand National Party	157,459	25.86
Total		608,992	100.00
Valid votes		608,992	97.55
Invalid/blank votes		15,306	2.45
Total votes		624,298	100.00
Registered voters/turnout		1,025,022	60.91
ULD gain from Grand National			
Source: National Election Commission

=== South Chungcheong ===
Candidate	Party	Votes	%
Sim Dae-pyung (incumbent)	United Liberal Democrats	656,795	84.64
Han Chung-soo	Grand National Party	119,216	15.36
Total		776,011	100.00
Valid votes		776,011	97.08
Invalid/blank votes		23,303	2.92
Total votes		799,314	100.00
Registered voters/turnout		1,343,633	59.49
ULD hold			
Source: National Election Commission

=== North Jeolla ===
Candidate	Party	Votes	%
Yu Jong-geun (incumbent)	National Congress for New Politics	758,141	100.00
Total		758,141	100.00
Valid votes		758,141	93.69
Invalid/blank votes		51,026	6.31
Total votes		809,167	100.00
Registered voters/turnout		1,400,419	57.78
National Congress hold			
Source: National Election Commission

=== South Jeolla ===
Candidate	Party	Votes	%
Heo Kyeong-man (incumbent)	National Congress for New Politics	918,300	100.00
Total		918,300	100.00
Valid votes		918,300	88.13
Invalid/blank votes		123,705	11.87
Total votes		1,042,005	100.00
Registered voters/turnout		1,527,489	68.22
National Congress hold			
Source: National Election Commission

=== North Gyeongsang ===
Candidate	Party	Votes	%
Lee Eui-geun (incumbent)	Grand National Party	911,728	71.97
Lee Pan-suk	United Liberal Democrats	355,149	28.03
Total		1,266,877	100.00
Valid votes		1,266,877	97.67
Invalid/blank votes		30,214	2.33
Total votes		1,297,091	100.00
Registered voters/turnout		1,999,195	64.88
Grand National hold			
Source: National Election Commission

=== South Gyeongsang ===
Candidate	Party	Votes	%
Kim Hyuk-kyu (incumbent)	Grand National Party	939,358	74.65
Kang Shin-hwa	National Congress	161,703	12.85
Heo Moon-doh	Independent	157,337	12.50
Total		1,258,398	100.00
Valid votes		1,258,398	97.69
Invalid/blank votes		29,773	2.31
Total votes		1,288,171	100.00
Registered voters/turnout		2,109,058	61.08
Grand National hold			
Source: National Election Commission

=== Jeju ===
Candidate	Party	Votes	%
Woo Geun-min	National Congress	139,695	52.77
Shin Koo-bum (incumbent)	Independent	81,491	30.78
Hyun Im-jong	Grand National Party	43,559	16.45
Total		264,745	100.00
Valid votes		264,745	98.42
Invalid/blank votes		4,239	1.58
Total votes		268,984	100.00
Registered voters/turnout		365,121	73.67
National Congress gain from Independent			
Source: National Election Commission

== Regional council elections ==
Party	Seats			
Party	FPTP	PR	Total	+/–
National Congress for New Politics	271	32	303	New
Grand National Party	224	29	253	–472
United Liberal Democrats	82	13	95	+1
Independents	39	–	39	–112
Total	616	74	690	–280
Source: NEC, CLAIR

=== Results by province or city ===
Province/City	Seats	NCNP	GNP	ULD	IND
Seoul	104	83	20	1	
Busan	49	2	46	1	
Daegu	29		28	1	
Incheon	29	21	5	2	1
Gwangju	17	16		1	
Daejeon	17	1		16	
Ulsan	17	1	11		5
Gyeonggi	97	66	21	10	
Gangwon	47	14	23	4	6
North Chungcheong	27	4		19	4
South Chungcheong	36	3		32	1
North Jeolla	38	34	1	1	2
South Jeolla	55	45	2	1	7
North Gyeongsang	60	1	48	6	5
South Gyeongsang	51	2	44		5
Jeju	17	10	4		3
Total	690	303	253	95	39
Source: NEC, CLAIR

=== Constituency seats ===
Province/City	Seats	NCNP	GNP	ULD	IND
Seoul	94	78	15	1	
Busan	44		43	1	
Daegu	26		26		
Incheon	26	20	4	1	1
Gwangju	14	14			
Daejeon	14			14	
Ulsan	14		9		5
Gyeonggi	88	61	18	9	
Gangwon	42	12	21	3	6
North Chungcheong	24	3		17	4
South Chungcheong	32	1		30	1
North Jeolla	34	32			2
South Jeolla	50	42		1	7
North Gyeongsang	54		44	5	5
South Gyeongsang	46		41		5
Jeju	14	8	3		3
Total	616	271	224	82	39
Source: NEC, CLAIR

=== Proportional representation seats ===
Province/City	Seats	NCNP	GNP	ULD
Seoul	10	5	5	
Busan	5	2	3	
Daegu	3		2	1
Incheon	3	1	1	1
Gwangju	3	2		1
Daejeon	3	1		2
Ulsan	3	1	2	
Gyeonggi	9	5	3	1
Gangwon	5	2	2	1
North Chungcheong	3	1		2
South Chungcheong	4	2		2
North Jeolla	4	2	1	1
South Jeolla	5	3	2	
North Gyeongsang	6	1	4	1
South Gyeongsang	5	2	3	
Jeju	3	2	1	
Total	74	32	29	13
Source: NEC, CLAIR

== Municipal mayoral elections ==
=== Summary ===
Party	Seats	+/–
National Congress for New Politics	84	New
Grand National Party	74	–80
United Liberal Democrats	29	+6
New National Party	1	New
Independents	44	–9
Total	232	+2
Source: NEC, CLAIR

=== Results by province or city ===
Province/City	Mayors	NCNP	GNP	ULD	NPP	Ind.
Seoul	25	19	5	1		
Busan	16		11			5
Daegu	8		7			1
Incheon	10	9		1		
Gwangju	5	5				
Daejeon	5	1		4		
Ulsan	5		3			2
Gyeonggi	31	20	6	2		3
Gangwon	18	1	13	2		2
North Chungcheong	11	2		6		3
South Chungcheong	15			11	1	3
North Jeolla	14	9				5
South Jeolla	22	15				7
North Gyeongsang	23	1	14	2		6
South Gyeongsang	20		14			6
Jeju	4	2	1			1
Total	232	84	74	29	1	44
Source: NEC, CLAIR

== Municipal council elections ==
3,490 seats in municipal councils were contested by candidates running as independents.

=== Seats by province or city ===
Province/City	Seats
Seoul	520
Busan	225
Daegu	146
Incheon	135
Gwangju	81
Daejeon	75
Ulsan	59
Gyeonggi	466
Gangwon	195
North Chungcheong	146
South Chungcheong	206
North Jeolla	249
South Jeolla	295
North Gyeongsang	342
South Gyeongsang	309
Jeju	41
Total	3,490
Source: National Election Commission
