= Kweon Seong-dong =

South Korean politician and lawyer (born 1960)

- 권성동
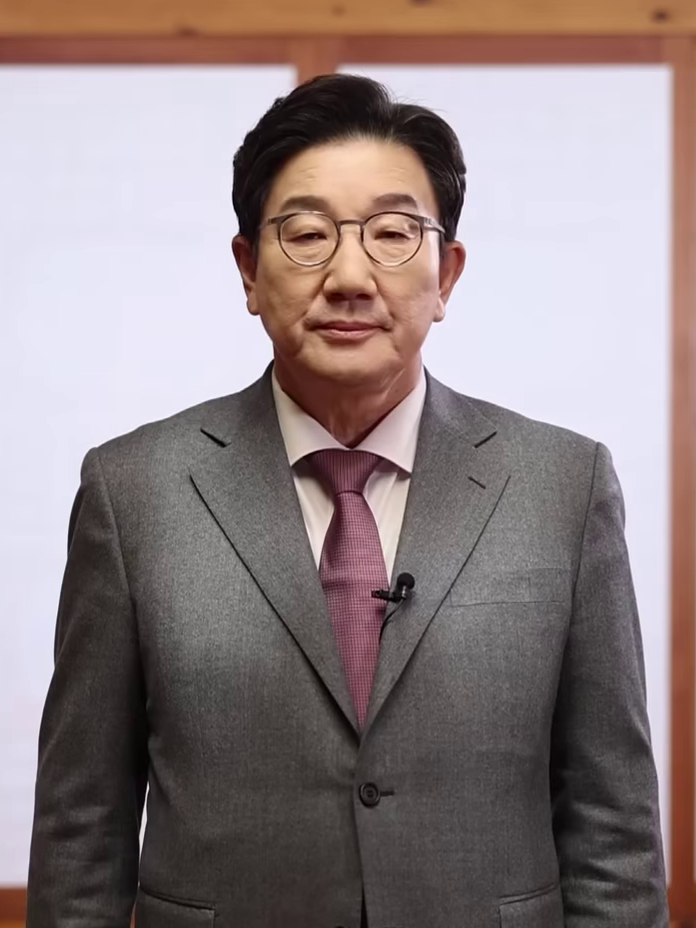
- Kweon in 2025

Member of the National Assembly for Gangneung (Gangwon)
- In office 29 October 2009 – 16 July 2026
- Preceded by: Choi Wook-chul
Party leadership offices
Leader of the People Power Party
Acting; 11 May 2025 – 15 May 2025
Preceded by	Kwon Young-se
Succeeded by	Kim Yong-tae
Acting; 16 December 2024 – 30 December 2024
Preceded by	Han Dong-hoon
Succeeded by	Kwon Young-se
Acting; 26 August 2022 – 8 September 2022
Preceded by	Joo Ho-young (ERC)
Succeeded by	Chung Jin-suk (ERC)
Acting; 8 July 2022 – 9 August 2022
Preceded by	Lee Jun-seok
Succeeded by	Joo Ho-young (ERC)
Floor Leader of the People Power Party
In office 8 April 2022 – 19 September 2022
Preceded by	Kim Gi-hyeon
Succeeded by	Joo Ho-young
In office 12 December 2024 – 5 June 2025
Preceded by	Choo Kyung-ho
Succeeded by	Park Hyeong-su (acting)
Secretary-General of the People Power Party
In office 18 November 2021 – 5 January 2022
President	Lee Jun-seok
Preceded by	Han Ki-ho
Succeeded by	Kwon Yeong-se
Secretary-General of the Saenuri Party
In office 2 June 2016 – 23 June 2016
Preceded by	Hwang Jin-ha; Hong Moon-pyo (acting)
Succeeded by	Park Myung-jae

Personal details
- Born: 29 April 1960 (age 66) Gangneung, South Korea
- Party: Independent (since 2026)
- Other political affiliations: GNP (2009–2012); Saenuri (2012–2016); Independent (2016–2017); Bareun (2017); Independent (2017); Liberty Korea (2017–2020); UFP (2020); Independent (2020); People Power (2020–2026)
- Spouse: Kim Jin-hee
- Children: 2
- Parent: Kweon Seung-ohk
- Education: Chung-Ang University
- Occupation: Lawyer, politician

Korean name
- Hangul: 권성동
- RR: Gwon Seongdong
- MR: Kwŏn Sŏngdong

Kweon Seong-dong (Korean: 권성동; born 29 April 1960) is a South Korean lawyer and politician. A member of the People Power Party, he served as the member of the National Assembly for Gangwon Gangneung from 2009 to 2026.

Before entering politics, Kweon worked as a prosecutor and lawyer at various prosecution offices and the Ministry of Justice. He made his political debut at the 2009 Gangneung by-election which he won with about 51% of popular votes. He made himself known through his role at the 2016 political scandal, which led to the impeachment of Park Geun-hye.

Kweon has held several high-ranking leadership positions within his party. He served as the floor leader of the People Power Party in 2022 and again from 2024 to 2025. Additionally, he has stepped in as the party's acting leader on four separate occasions: twice in 2022, once in December 2024, and most recently in May 2025. He also previously served as the secretary-general for both the People Power Party and its predecessor, the Saenuri Party.

In January 2026, Kweon was convicted of taking bribes from the Unification Church and sentenced to two years in prison. On July 16, 2026, the Supreme Court upheld the conviction, which resulted in his removal from political office.

== Early life and education ==
Kweon was born in Gangneung, Gangwon Province, South Korea in 1960. He is the eldest of the three sons and a daughter of a housewife and Kweon Seung-ohk (died in 2022), was an educator and the former Director of Gangneung Myeongnyun Institution. He attended Gangneung Myeongnyun High School before joining Chung-Ang University, where he studied law.

== Career ==
Although Kweon participated in anti-dictatorship movements in 1980, he chose to prepare for the bar instead of continuing his activism as he did not agree with "radical changes". He was qualified for the bar in 1985.

Shortly after completing national service, he began his prosecutor career at Suwon District Prosecutor's Office in March 1991, where he worked till transferred to Gangneung branch of Chuncheon District Public Prosecutors Office in September 1993. He then moved to Seoul, where he worked at Seoul Central District Prosecutors' Office, the Ministry of Justice, Seoul Eastern District Prosecutors' Offices, and the Supreme Prosecutors' Office, between 1994 and 2000, and again between 2003 and 2005. His prosecutor career came to the end at Gwangju High Prosecutor's Office in 2006. He then briefly worked as a lawyer at Sojong Partners.

While he was working at the Ministry of Justice in 1999, Kweon made a draft of the National Human Rights Commission Act that was later submitted to the National Assembly. The bill was, however, scrapped by the then ruling party, Millennium Democratic Party (MDP), who instead established the National Human Rights Commission based on the demand of left-leaning non-governmental organisations (NGO). This made him to join politics.

=== Politics ===
In the 2008 election, Kweon made an unsuccessful attempt to contest for Gangneung under the Grand National Party (GNP) banner.

On 8 April 2022, Kweon was elected parliamentary leader of the People Power Party, defeating Cho Hae-jin.

On 7 May 2025, Kweon went on a hunger strike as part of efforts to pressure the PPP into committing to a common candidate for the 2025 South Korean presidential election. This followed inconclusive negotiations between PPP candidate Kim Moon-soo and independent candidate Han Duck-soo. On 11 September 2025, the National Assembly approved a motion to arrest Kweon on charges of bribery from the Unification Church. On 17 September, the Seoul Central District Court issued an arrest warrant against him.

In January 2026, Kweon was convicted of taking bribes from the Unification Church. The conviction was upheld by the Seoul High Court and the Supreme Court. He was given a two-year jail term and ordered to forfeit the sum he received. His conviction resulted in his removal from political office.

== Election results ==
Year	Elections	Constituency	Political party	Votes (%)	Remarks
2009	2009 By-election	Gangneung (Gangwon)	GNP	34,834 (50.90%)	Won
2012	19th National Assembly General Election	Gangneung (Gangwon)	Saenuri	57,444 (60.78%)	Won
2016	20th National Assembly General Election	Gangneung (Gangwon)	Saenuri	54,359 (57.15%)	Won
2020	21st National Assembly General Election	Gangneung (Gangwon)	Independent	49,618 (40.84%)	Won
2024	22nd National Assembly General Election	Gangneung (Gangwon)	PPP	64,743 (54.24%)	Won
