= Hanol-gyo =

Korean spiritual foundation

Hanol-gyo (Korean: 한얼교, also referred to as Hanol gyo or Hanolgyo) is a Korean spiritual foundation established by Shin Jeong Yil who was also a presidential Candidate of the Unified Korea Party and the Chairman of the Hanol Group. The innovative nature of Hanol-gyo can be particularly characterized as the initiator of Hanol Spiritual and Cultural Movement of Art. It is a re-invigorated practice after the effects of land-based colonization.

== History and Its principle ==
In the historical record of Hanol-gyo(한얼교), Shin Jeong Yil (신정일) the Founder, achieved spiritual awakening in 1965, and spread the teachings on Hanol. "The conversion of 800,000 people to the Hanol Spiritual movement laid a foundation for the creation of the Hanol-gyo, which was approved by the Korean Government as a legitimate religion in 1967." The Governmental recognition led to the rapid development of its branches throughout the country.

Hanol spiritual foundation was established based on "Hanol principle" which is the teachings on enlightenment and awakening; it pursues self-liberation of consciousness rather than the traditional ways of religious worship. Its founding dictum is to "unite and benefit all in existence-홍익인간 Hongick Ingan”.

According to its doctrine of Spiritual Acceptance, Hanol-gyo is open to multi-culture as it allows its participants from various cultures to practice their religions as well. It regards all enlightened beings (Dangun, Buddha, Jesus, Lao-tzu, Confucius, etc.) as teachers of enlightenment and awakening, and other religions as the pursuit of True Spirituality in different ways. Its main aim is to overcome all forms of separations (e.g. Religion, Race, Ideology and so on).

The founder's Doctrine "Na-Ol is Han-Ol" means “My spiritual essence is the spiritual essence of Han”. It can be interpreted as “My essence is one with the Essence of Totality” or ”Everyone shares the same existential nature”.

"Hanol-gyo helps to find one's true nature (Na-Ol) which is one with the nature of all (Han-Ol), and fulfill one's true nature by practicing love, wisdom and devotion — the will of Absolute Benevolence."

In Hanol-gyo, there are no figures to worship: instead there is an "Empty Chair" that symbolizes the invisible and silent nature of one's true essence beyond one's physical form of self and mental form of ego — the Na-Ol. The invisibility and stillness also reflect the essence of Hanol, which is ultimately one with Na-Ol.

In 1999, Shin Jeong Yil passed away and unprecedented number of holy crystals of sari (sacred matter found among the cremated remains of enlightened monks and Buddha) were recovered. According to the news record, "The sari was opened to the public and well known celebrities, including the spiritual leaders of other religions, paid a visit to witness the sari: Hanol-gyo has been exhibiting the sari at the Commemoration Ceremonies of the Founder."

Before he was deceased, Shin published the Hanol Scriptures, the compilation of 36 books containing the profound teachings of the 'Hanol principles' and its applications on philosophy, epistemology, metaphysics, science, economics, politics, society, nature, culture and religion.

After he was deceased, the independent committee called the Board of Hanol-gyo was organized to assume collective leadership. The Board refrained from the traditional concepts of ritual and transformed Hanol-gyo into a more liberal, flexible organization. Also, the Board officially made religious conversion unnecessary and constitutionalized the spiritual acceptance of multi-culture and religious multiplicity so that the adherents of Hanol-gyo could participate in other religions as they wish.

Hanolgyo introduced the ”Art of Enlightenment and Awakening” which is the expression of the Hanol spirit in the form of art and architecture. It was integration of art and spirituality. The “Art of Enlightenment” replaced the symbolic function of the regional chapels of Hanol, and permitted that traditional ceremonies and the formality of rituals to be substituted by simple contemplation on the “Enlightenment Art” or meditation on self-awareness.

== Hanol Spiritual and Cultural Movement of Art ==
In commemoration of the 50th anniversary general assembly, the entire foundation members of Hanol-gyo officially agreed upon endorsing religious innovation called Hanol Spiritual & Cultural Movement of Art.

The Hanol Spiritual and Cultural Movement of Art is a new way of experiencing religious philosophy without religious obligation by using On-line participation as a main way of religious practice instead of the traditional ways.

It presented a new possibility for the development of religious multi-culture and structural evolution of religion by expanding the religious boundaries in a wider perspective.

== Written/publications ==
- 1966 The Path: the Meditation on Transcendence (묘도경)
- 1967 The Theories on Form, Formlessness and Transcendence of Form (진공묘유론), The Book on Truth and Nature (정연장서)
- 1968 The Incredibility of Truth (바른 모습의 신비), The principles of Unification: Truth Movement (정일운동요람), Transcendentalization (정화)
- 1969 The Book on the Reflection of Truth (정학경서)
- 1970 The Introduction to the Theory of Truth (정학입문)
- 1972 The Philosophy on Transcendentalization (정화이념)
- 1973 The Emergence of Unified Religion (통합종교의 출현)
- 1975 The Enlightened and Awakened Progenitor, DANGUN
- 1976 Spirit Truth Happiness (얼.바름.행복)
- 1978 The Sacred Book on Human-race, Humanity, HANOL (민족성전, 인류성전, 한얼경서)
- 1980 The Concept of HANOL Spirit (한사상), HANOL-GYO (한얼교)
- 1981 The Quintessence of HANOL Spirit (한사상의 본질)
- 1982 The First Principle of HANOL Spirit (한사상의 원론)
- 1984 Shin Jeong Yil, The Founder of Hanol-gyo (한얼교 창교주 신정일)
- 1985 The Quantum Physics of HAN (한과학론)
- 1986 The Political Theory of HANOL and its applications (한주의온얼사상론)
- 1987 The Reflection of HAN (한경), The proposal to Constitutional Reform on Presidential Election (대통령직선제 개헌을 제의한다)
- 1988 The Texts of 13th Presidential Candidate Speech (제13대 대통령 후보 연설문집), The HANOL Scripture (한얼말씀(한얼성서)), The Technology of Trans-Spirit (첨단정신 기술학개론)
- 1989 The Path (나의 길), HANOL Political Philosophy (한주의 정치 철학)
- 1990 The Peaceful Unification of Korean peninsula(한반도 통일)
- 1991 The Trinity of Possibility (가능성의 삼위일체), The Equilibrium of Korean Unification (한반도 통일을 향한 중도 노선)
- 1993 The Theoretical Approaches on HAN: Mathematics and Science (온울과학 성격수학 개론)
- 1994 The Text book on HANON theory (신정일 정신한온학)
- 1995 The Guidance to Enlightenment and Awakening (한얼교 육대원리 교리서)
- 1996 The Sacred Doctrine of 10,000 years (한님의 만년교리)
- 1998 The HANOL (36books) (한얼말씀 36권)

=== Publications after year 2000 ===
- The Scriptures of HANOL (Edited from 36 books of original version into 1) (한얼의 서)
- The Sacred Book of 10,000 years (만년성서)
- The Book of NAOL (The textbook of Formless & Infinite possibility) (나얼의 서)
- The Textbook of Enlightenment (광명의 서)
- Scripture of ONOL (온얼 광명의 서)
- Intellectual Revolution: Spiritual Democracy (지적혁명)
- The Book of Will Power (정념의 서)
- The letters of NAOL Dictums: The Teachings of HANOL principles (훈법지)
- The Daily Imperatives (실생활법문)
- The Essays on HANOL (전법교육에세이)

== See also ==
- Shin Jeong Yil
