= Shim Wan-koo =

South Korean politician (1938–2020)

- 심완구

Mayor of Ulsan
- In office 15 July 1997 – 30 June 2002
- Preceded by: Position established
- Succeeded by: Park Maeng-woo

Member of the National Assembly
- In office 30 May 1988 – 29 May 1992
- Constituency: Ulsan Nam-gu
- In office 13 May 1985 – 29 May 1988
- Preceded by: Ko Won-jun; Lee Kyu-jung
- Constituency: Ulsan; Ulju County

Personal details
- Born: 1 July 1938 Daehyeon-myeon, Ulsan-gun, Korea, Empire of Japan
- Died: 8 June 2020 (aged 81) Seocho, Seoul, South Korea
- Other political affiliations: Grand National Party Democratic Liberal Party; Reunification Democratic Party Democratic Korea Party

Korean name
- Hangul: 심완구
- Hanja: 沈完求
- RR: Sim Wangu
- MR: Sim Wan'gu

Shim Wan-koo (Korean: 심완구; 1 July 1938 – 8 June 2020) was a South Korean politician who served as the first elected Mayor of Ulsan. He was a member of the National Assembly from 1985 to 1992.

== Early life and education ==
Shim was born in Songho Village, Yaum-ri, Daehyeon-myeon, Ulsan-gun, Keishōnan Province (South Gyeongsang Province), Korea, Empire of Japan on July 1, 1938. He graduated from Sungkyunkwan University; majoring in economics.

== Political career ==
=== Member of the National Assembly and Mayor of Ulsan (1985–2002) ===
Shim ran for the Ulsan-Ulju County electoral district in the 1981 South Korean legislative election and but came in third place with only 18.44% of the vote. He ran for the same electoral district in the 1985 South Korean legislative election and was elected along with Kim Tae-ho of the ruling Democratic Justice Party. He ran under the Reunification Democratic Party for the Ulsan Nam-gu electoral district in the 1988 South Korean legislative election and was elected for a four-year term. He ran for the same district in the 1992 South Korean legislative election, but lost to Cha Soo-myung.

Shim was elected as Mayor of Ulsan in 1995, however as Ulsan took its current form as a metropolitan city on July 15, 1997; making Shim's official term start from July 15, 1997.

He left the conservative Grand National Party on September 14, 1998, and joined the more liberal National Congress for New Politics that was led by Kim Dae-jung. He was sentenced to jail in 2002 for accepting bribery from a construction company, but all charges against him were dropped and he was later pardoned by Roh Moo-hyun.

=== After serving as Mayor of Ulsan (2002–2020) ===
While Shim supported conservative candidate Lee Myung-bak during the 2007 South Korean presidential election, he supported liberal candidate Moon Jae-in during the 2012 South Korean presidential election. He supported Song Cheol-ho's campaign for Mayor of Ulsan in 2018.
