= Neungin High School =

- 능인고등학교
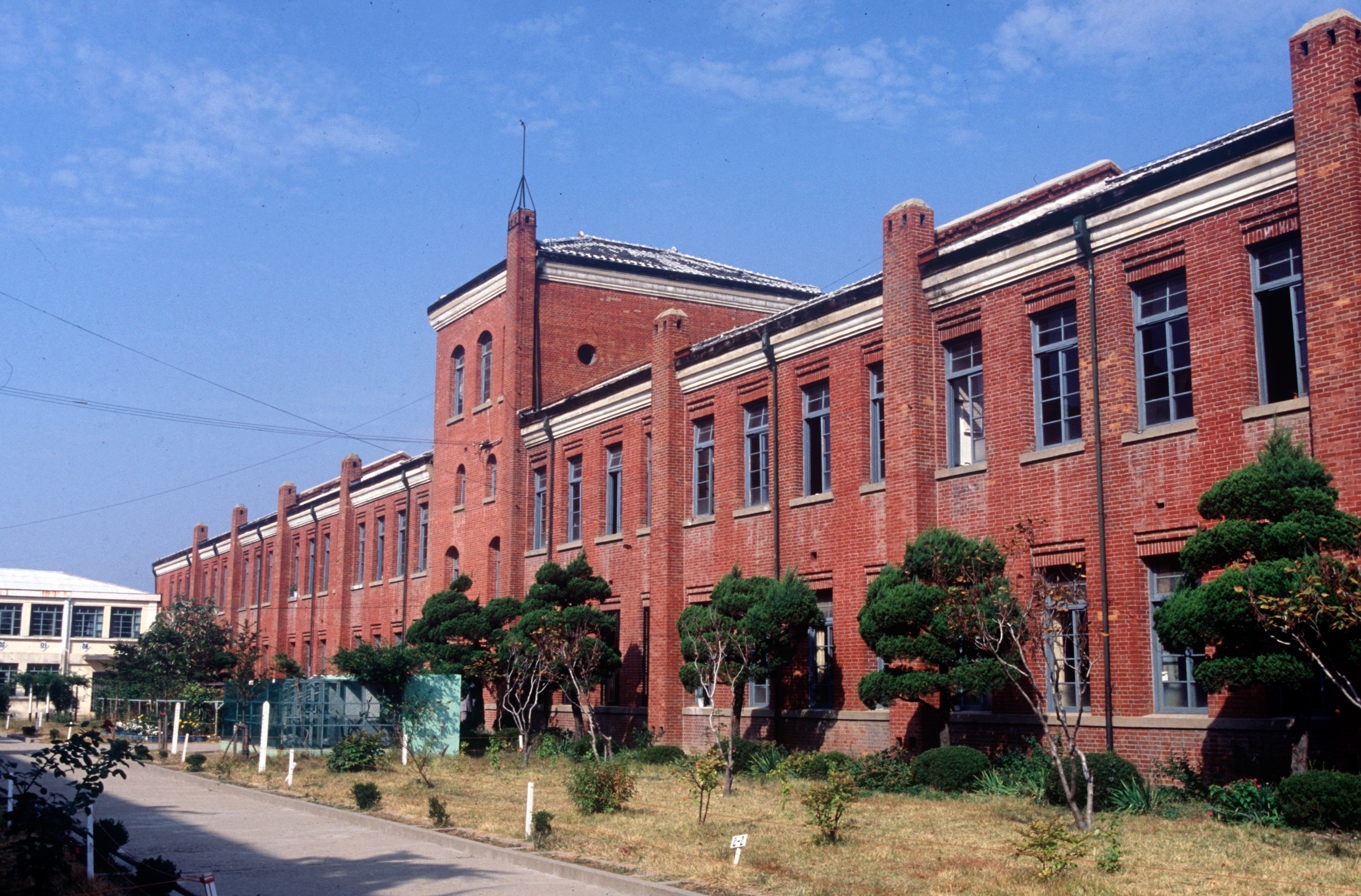
- Daegu; South Korea

Information
- Motto: 밝게 알고 올바르게 행하자 (Know bright and act right)
- Religious affiliation: Jogye Order
- Established: October 9, 1939
- Authority: Daegu Metropolitan Office of Education
- Website: neungin.dge.hs.kr

Neungin High School (능인고등학교) is a private boy's high school in Suseong District, Daegu, South Korea affiliated with the Jogye Order. It was established in 1939. As of 2026, there are 776 students enrolled. Its motto is "know bright and act right" (밝게 알고 올바르게 행하자) inspired from the Noble Eightfold Path.

== History ==
In October 1939, the school was established under the name Osan Buddhist School (오산불교학교) on the grounds of Eunhaesa in Yeongcheon to "revive the fading national spirit" through teaching Korean history and language. When the school opened, 125 students enrolled and Kim Dong-hwa was appointed as the first principal. The school originally offered a five-year program.

In 1944, student admissions were halted under the Japanese empire's School Wartime Emergency Measures Act (학교전시비상조치법). After the liberation of Korea, the school was reorganized to Osan Agricultural and Forestry Practical School (오산농림실수학교). In 1946, it received approval of establishment as Neungin Middle School and offered a four-year program. It moved to Icheon-dong in 1950. In 1951, it was separated into a middle school and high school and Neungin High School was established.

Following President Syngman Rhee’s resignation after the 1960 April Revolution, students from Neungin High School and other high schools in Daegu held a demonstration on May 3 demanding the dissolution of the existing National Assembly and calling for a new assembly to be elected before pursuing constitutional amendments. In 1986, it relocated to Suseong District, Daegu.

== Notable alumni ==
- Joo Ho-young: South Korean politician
