= Shin Jeong-yil =

South Korean politician (1938–1999)

- Hangul: 신정일
- Hanja: 申正一
- RR: Sin Jeongil
- MR: Sin Chŏngil

Shin Jeong Yil (Shin Jeongyil, Korean: 신정일; Hanja: 申正一, 1938–1999) was the founder of Hanol-gyo (Korean spiritual foundation), a politician (the founder of Unified Korea party) and an entrepreneur(the founder of Hanon Group).

== Hanol-gyo ==
Hanol-gyo was established based on Hanol principle which is the teachings on enlightenment and awakening; it pursues self-liberation of consciousness rather than the traditional ways of religious worship.

According to its doctrine of Spiritual Acceptance, Hanol-gyo is open to multi-culture as it allows its participants from various cultures to practice their religion as well. It regards all enlightened beings (Dangun, Buddha, Jesus, Lao-tzu, Confucius, etc.) as teachers of enlightenment and awakening, and various religions as the pursuit of True Spirituality in different ways. Its aim is to overcome all forms of separations (e.g., religion, race, ideology and so on).

The Founder's Doctrine is "Naol is Hanol", which means "My true spiritual nature is one with the spiritual nature of All."

"The conversion of 800,000 people to the Hanol Spiritual movement laid a foundation for the creation of the Hanol Spiritual Foundation, which was approved by the Korean Government as a legitimate religion in 1967. The Governmental recognition led to the rapid development of its branches throughout the country and the followers of Hanol-gyo reached 2 million members at its peak. According to the «Encyclopedia of Korean Culture», there were 2 million followers during its heyday. Another survey of the «Current status of religious groups» published by the Ministry of Culture and Public Information shows that there were 520,000 followers in 1982, and approximately 410,000 followers in 1997, with 186 branches located throughout the country including the main temples in the major cities of Seoul, Busan and Daegu." — Hanol-gyo, Encyclopedia of Korean Culture

== Other activities ==
As a politician, Shin formed the Unified Korea Political Party and ran for the South Korean presidency twice, in the 13th election in 1987 and 15th election in 1997.

As the founder and chairman of the Hanon Group, Shin acquired the right to develop one of the largest crude oil mines in Iraq. He protested against the war in Iraq and supplied medicine for the children suffering from the war. As recognition of his humanitarian and diplomatic efforts, he was appointed to the Honorary Consul by both the Iraqi and South Korean governments.

== Later years ==
Shin died in 1999. According to the press, "unprecedented number of sari (sacred crystals found among the cremated remains of enlightened monks and Buddha) were found and witnessed by many people including clerics and monks of other religions. Hanol-gyo has been exhibiting the sari at the Commemoration Ceremonies of the Founder."

== Timeline ==
- 1965 Established the Foundation of Hanol
- 1967 Established the Jeong-Yil Association Inc.
- 1971 Established <Junghwhasa> publications
- 1973 President of the National Association of Dangun, the Progenitor of Korea
- 1978 Founder of the Central Association of Hanol-gyo
- 1979 Premier Representative of Hanol-gyo Inc.
- 1980 Head of the Research Institute of Hanol Philosophy
- 1980 Public Proclamation of 'The Declaration of Hanol'
- 1981 Chairman of the National Committee of the Spiritual Enhancement Organization
- 1981 President of the Korean Club of the International Kendo Federation
- 1984 Honorary Chairman of the Labor and Agrarian Political Party
- 1985 Standing member of the Advisory Council for the Democratic and Peaceful Unification Policy
- 1987 Member of the founding committee of the Unified Korea Political Party/ Advisor to the Research Institute of the Unified Korea Party
- 1987 Unified Korea Party 13th Korean Presidential Candidate
- 1989 Chairman of the Board, Institute of Korean Diplomacy and Defense
- 1989 President of the Association of Korean Technology and Development
- 1991 Presenter of the "Political Theory on the Peaceful Unification of Korea" at the John F. Kennedy School of Government, Harvard Institute of Politics
- 1992 Chairman of the Hanon Group
- 1996 Honorary Consul of Iraq in South Korea
- 1997 Harris Manchester College Foundation Fellow, Oxford University
- 1997 Unified Korea Party candidate in the 15th South Korean presidential election
- 1998 The fifth Chairman of the Korea Wushu Federation
- [Former] Member of the Korean Olympic Committee (KOC)

== Publications ==
- 1966 The Path: the Meditation on Transcendence (묘도경)
- 1967 The Theories on Form, Formlessness and Transcendence of Form (진공묘유론), The Book on Truth and Nature (정연장서)
- 1968 The Incredibility of Truth (바른 모습의 신비), The principles of Unification: Truth Movement (정일운동요람), Transcendentalization (정화)
- 1969 The Book on the Reflection of Truth (정학경서)
- 1970 The Introduction to the Theory of Truth (정학입문)
- 1972 The Philosophy on Transcendentalization (정화이념)
- 1973 The Emergence of Unified Religion (통합종교의 출현)
- 1975 The Enlightened and Awakened Progenitor, Dangun
- 1976 Spirit Truth Happiness (얼.바름.행복)
- 1978 The Sacred Book on Human-race, Humanity, Hanol (민족성전, 인류성전, 한얼경서)
- 1980 The Concept of Hanol Spirit (한사상), Hanol-Gyo (한얼교)
- 1981 The Quintessence of Hanol Spirit (한사상의 본질)
- 1982 The First Principle of Hanol Spirit (한사상의 원론)
- 1984 Shin Jeong Yil, The Founder of Hanol-gyo (한얼교 창교주 신정일)
- 1985 The Quantum Physics of Han (한과학론)
- 1986 The Political Theory of Hanol and its applications (한주의온얼사상론)
- 1987 The Reflection of Han (한경), The proposal to Constitutional Reform on Presidential Election (대통령직선제 개헌을 제의한다)
- 1988 The Texts of 13th Presidential Candidate Speech (제13대 대통령 후보 연설문집), The Hanol Scripture (한얼말씀(한얼성서)), The Technology of Trans-Spirit (첨단정신 기술학개론)
- 1989 The Path (나의 길), Hanol Political Philosophy (한주의 정치 철학)
- 1990 The Peaceful Unification of Korean peninsula(한반도 통일)
- 1991 The Trinity of Possibility (가능성의 삼위일체), The Equilibrium of Korean Unification (한반도 통일을 향한 중도 노선)
- 1993 The Theoretical Approaches on Han: Mathematics and Science (온울과학 성격수학 개론)
- 1994 The Text book on Hanon theory (신정일 정신한온학)
- 1995 The Guidance to Enlightenment and Awakening (한얼교 육대원리 교리서)
- 1996 The Sacred Doctrine of 10,000 years (한님의 만년교리)
- 1998 The Hanol (36books) (한얼말씀 36권)

== See also ==
- Hanol-gyo
