= 1960 South Korean local elections =

Local elections were held in South Korea in December 1960. Elections for special city and provincial councilors were held on 12 December, city, town and township councilors on 19 December, city, town and township mayors on 26 December and special city mayor and provincial governors on 29 December. One special city mayor, nine provincial governors, 26 city mayors, 82 town mayors, 1,359 township mayors, 54 special city councilors, 433 provincial councilors, 420 city councilors, 1,055 town councilors and 15,376 township councilors were elected.

== Special city and provincial elections ==
=== Councilors ===
Elections for special city and provincial councilors were held on 12 December 1960.

Party	Seats					
Party	Votes	%	Special city	Provinces	Total	+/–
Democratic Party			19	176	195	+97
New Democratic Party			17	53	70	New
Socialist Mass Party			0	2	2	New
Other parties			1	3	4	+4
Independents			17	199	216	+133
Invalid/blank votes		–	–	–	–	–
Total		100	54	433	487	+50
Registered voters/turnout	11,263,445	67.4	–	–	–	–
Source: National Election Commission

=== Special city mayor and provincial governors ===
Elections for special city mayor and provincial governors were held on 29 December 1960.

Special city/ province	Voter turnout	Elected mayor/ governor	Party
Seoul	36.4%	Kim Sang-don	Democratic Party
Gyeonggi	32.8%	Shin Kwang-kyun	Democratic Party
Gangwon	47.8%	Park Yeong-rok	Democratic Party
North Chungcheong	44.5%	Jo Dae-yeon	Democratic Party
South Chungcheong	39.8%	Lee Gi-se	New Democratic Party
North Jeolla	42.7%	Kim Sang-sul	Democratic Party
South Jeolla	44.2%	Min Young-nam	New Democratic Party
North Gyeongsang	35.8%	Lee Ho-geun	Democratic Party
South Gyeongsang	33.2%	Lee Gi-ju	New Democratic Party
Jeju	62.2%	Kang Seong-ik	Independent

== City, town and township elections ==
=== Councilors ===
Elections for city, town and township councilors were held on 19 December 1960.

Party	City				Town				Township			
Party	Votes	%	Seats	+/–	Votes	%	Seats	+/–	Votes	%	Seats	+/–
Democratic Party			129	+75			142	+85			2,510	+2,279
New Democratic Party			45	New			39	New			241	New
Socialist Mass Party			0	New			0	New			3	New
Other parties			8	–2			2	+1			44	+11
Independents			238	+61			872	+481			12,578	+8,294
Invalid/blank votes		–	–	–		–	–	–		–	–	
Total		100	420	+4		100	1,055	+65		100	15,376	–172
Registered voters/turnout	1,995,994	67.45	–	–	989,574	77.5	–	–	7,128,216	83.7	–	–
Source: National Election Commission

=== Mayors ===
Elections for city, town and township mayors were held on 26 December 1960.

Party	City				Town				Township			
Party	Votes	%	Mayors	+/–	Votes	%	Mayors	+/–	Votes	%	Mayors	+/–
Democratic Party			12	+12			23	+22			297	+288
New Democratic Party			5	New			3	New			13	New
Other parties			0	–			0	–			4	+3
Independents			9	+5			56	+36			1,045	+802
Invalid/blank votes		–	–	–		–	–	–		–	–	–
Total		100	26	+20		100	82	+52		100	1,359	+815
Registered voters/turnout	2,035,429	54.6	–	–	1,021,388	72.7	–	–	7,228,937	81.6	–	–
Source: National Election Commission
