= Song Cheol-ho =

South Korean politician (born 1949)

- 송철호

Mayor of Ulsan
- In office 1 July 2018 – 30 June 2022
- Preceded by: Kim Gi-hyeon
- Succeeded by: Kim Doo-gyum

Personal details
- Born: 26 May 1949 (age 77) Bosu-dong, Jung District, Busan, South Korea
- Party: Democratic
- Education: Korea University; University of Ulsan
- Religion: Roman Catholic(Christian Name : Thomas More)
- Website: Official Website

Korean name
- Hangul: 송철호
- Hanja: 宋哲鎬
- RR: Song Cheolho
- MR: Song Ch'ŏrho

Song Cheol-ho (Korean: 송철호; born 26 May 1949) is a South Korean lawyer and politician and served as the mayor of Ulsan from 2018 to 2022.

== Life ==
Song Cheol-ho was born in Bosu-dong, Jung District, Busan in 1949 and he grew up in Iksan, North Jeolla Province, where his father was born.

Song passed the bar exam in 1982 and became a lawyer.

His brother is Song Jung-ho, who served as justice minister in 2002. Like his brother, he joined the government in 2005.

Song was although he lost eight elections, he was elected mayor of Ulsan in 2018.

In 2023, Song was convicted along with then-Ulsan police chief Hwang Un-ha for election interference over a conspiracy to engineer an investigation against a rival during the 2018 election, but was acquitted on appeal in 2025.

== Election results ==
=== General elections ===
Year	Elections	Constituency	Political party	Votes (%)	Results
1992	14th National Assembly General Election	Ulsan Jung (South Gyeongsang)	Democratic	19,685 (15.42%)	Defeated (3rd)
1996	15th National Assembly General Election	Ulsan Jung (South Gyeongsang)	United Democratic	39,743 (35.73%)	Defeated (2nd)
2000	16th National Assembly General Election	Jung (Ulsan)	Independent	33,548 (38.16%)	Defeated (2nd)
2012	19th National Assembly General Election	Jung (Ulsan)	DUP	37,412 (37.51%)	Defeated (2nd)
2014	2014 By-election	Nam B (Ulsan)	Independent	16,379 (44.18%)	Defeated (2nd)
2016	20th National Assembly General Election	Nam B (Ulsan)	Independent	28,216 (40.64%)	Defeated (2nd)

=== Local elections ===
==== Mayor of Ulsan ====
Year	Elections	Constituency	Political party	Votes (%)	Remarks
1998	2nd Iocal Election	Ulsan (Mayoral Elections)	Independent	148,126 (39.44%)	Defeated (2nd)
2002	3rd Iocal Election	Ulsan (Mayoral Elections)	DLP	162,546 (43.61%)	Defeated (2nd)
2018	7th Iocal Election	Ulsan (Mayoral Elections)	Democratic	317,341 (52.88%)	Won
2022	8th Iocal Election	Ulsan (Mayoral Elections)	Democratic	195,430 (40.21%)	Defeated (2nd)
