= Korea University School of Law =

South Korean law school

- 고려대학교 법학전문대학원
- Type: Private
- Postgraduates: 360 (J.D.)
- Location: Seoul, South Korea
- Website: lawschool.korea.ac.kr

Korea University School of Law, located in Seoul, South Korea, is the law school of Korea University, a member of the SKY universities. The Law School is widely considered to be one of the most prestigious law schools in South Korea, as it has produced many of the nation's most influential lawyers, prosecutors, judges, and politicians.

== History ==
For over a century, Korea University Law School has been a pioneer of legal education in South Korea. As South Korea's oldest law school, Korea University Law School can be traced back to the Law Department of Bosung College, founded in 1905. The College's Law Department was the first private institution in Korea to provide a legal education in the early 20th century. It played an important role in shaping the modern legal education system in South Korea. The school's success as a leading institution for legal education in South Korea has been bolstered by being ranked first in passing the bar exam.

== International rankings ==
In the 2013 QS World University Rankings, the law program at Korea University was ranked 51~100 in the world. Its rival, Yonsei University, was ranked 101-150 worldwide.

== Notable alumni ==
- Oh Se-hoon: 34th Mayor of Seoul
- Hong Joon-pyo: Presiding speaker of the ruling Grand National Party
- Jeong Se-kyun: Presiding speaker of the ruling Democratic Party
- Lim Chae-Jung: Speaker of the 17th National Assembly of South Korea
