= Lim Chae-jung =

South Korean politician (born 1941)

- 임채정
- Born: July 27, 1941 (age 85); Naju South Jeolla, South Korea
- Education: Korea University (LL.B.); Chonnam National University (Hon. Ph.D.)
- Occupation: Politician
- Office: Speaker of the National Assembly
- Predecessor: Kim Won-ki
- Successor: Kim Hyong-o
- Political party: Democratic Party of Korea

Korean name
- Hangul: 임채정
- RR: Im Chaejeong
- MR: Im Ch'aejŏng

Lim Chae-jung (Korean: 임채정; born July 27, 1941) is a South Korean politician.

== Early life and education ==
Lim Chae-jung was born on July 27, 1941, in Ulsan, South Korea. He earned a Bachelor of Laws from Korea University. In recognition of his long-standing contributions to national governance and legal development, he was awarded an Honorary Doctorate in Law from Chonnam National University in 2008.

== Political career ==
Lim is a prominent four-term member of the National Assembly, serving in the 14th, 15th, 16th, and 17th assemblies. He played a pivotal role in the transition of political power in South Korea, notably serving as the Chairman of the Presidential Transition Committee for President Roh Moo-hyun in 2002.

In June 2006, he was elected as the Speaker of the 17th National Assembly. During his speakership, he was noted for promoting a "policy-oriented parliament" and actively supporting inter-Korean economic cooperation.

== Later years ==
Following his tenure as Speaker, Lim has continued to serve as a senior advisor to the Democratic Party of Korea. He remains an active elder statesman, providing counsel on national affairs and major legislative issues.

== Election results ==
Year	Elections	Constituency	Political party	Votes (%)	Results
1988	13th National Assembly General Election	Nowon B (Seoul)	PDP	30,346 (29.99%)	Defeated (2nd)
1992	17th National Assembly General Election	Nowon B (Seoul)	Democratic	40,601 (32.96%)	Won
1996	15th National Assembly General Election	Nowon B (Seoul)	NCNP	41,615 (33.25%)	Won
2000	16th National Assembly General Election	Nowon B (Seoul)	MDP	47,815 (41.11%)	Won
2004	17th National Assembly General Election	Nowon C (Seoul)	Uri	44,923 (45.21%)	Won

== Honours ==
- (South Korea) Grand Order of Mugunghwa (2008)

Political offices
Preceded by Kim Won-ki	Speaker of the National Assembly of South Korea; 19 June 2006–29 May 2008	Succeeded by Kim Hyong-o
National Assembly of the Republic of Korea
Preceded by Kim Yong-chae	Member of the National Assembly from Nowon B (Seoul); 8 September 1992–29 May 2004	Succeeded by Woo Won-shik (Nowon B, Seoul); Himself (Nowon C, Seoul)
Preceded by Ham Seung-hee (Nowon A, Seoul); Himself (Nowon B, Seoul)	Member of the National Assembly from Nowon C (Seoul); 30 May 2004–29 May 2008	Succeeded by Hong Jung-wook
Party political offices
Preceded by Lee Boo-young	Interim Chairman of the Uri Party; 5 January 2005–2 April 2005	Succeeded by Moon Hee-sang
