= List of current South Korean mayors and governors =

Current ruling parties in South Korea DPK (12) PPP (4)

The high-level local governments of South Korea consist of one Special City, six Metropolitan Cities, one Special Self-Governing City, eight Provinces, and two Special Self-Governing Province, totalling up to 17 governing councils. The head of the city is referred as the mayor and that of the province as the governor. These Local government heads are elected by direct popular vote for a four-year term. The head of the local government can also be re-elected for up to three terms.

Currently, the Democratic Party of Korea holds 12 local governments out of 16, six mayors and six governors. The other four local governments are headed by the People Power Party, being two mayors and two governors.

== Current office-holders ==
Colour key for parties
People Power Party
Democratic Party of Korea

City/Province (Past)	Name		Portrait	Took office (tenure length)	Position	Party	Ref.
City/Province (Past)	English	Hangul	Portrait	Took office (tenure length)	Position	Party	Ref.
Special City
Seoul (List)	Oh Se-hoon	오세훈		8 April 2021 (5 years, 117 days)	Mayor	People Power	
Special Metropolitan City
Jeonnam-Gwangju (List)	Min Hyung-bae	민형배		1 July 2026 (33 days)	Mayor	Democratic	
Metropolitan Cities
Busan (List)	Chun Jae-soo	전재수		1 July 2026 (33 days)	Mayor	Democratic	
Daegu (List)	Choo Kyung-ho	추경호		1 July 2026 (33 days)	Mayor	People Power	
Incheon (List)	Park Chan-dae	박찬대		1 July 2026 (33 days)	Mayor	Democratic	
Daejeon (List)	Heo Tae-jeong	허태정		1 July 2026 (33 days)	Mayor	Democratic	
Ulsan (List)	Kim Sang-wook	김상욱		1 July 2026 (33 days)	Mayor	Democratic	
Special Self-Governing City					Mayor		
Sejong (List)	Cho Sang-ho	조상호		1 July 2026 (33 days)	Mayor	Democratic	
Provinces
Gyeonggi (List)	Choo Mi-ae	추미애		1 July 2026 (33 days)	Governor	Democratic	
North Chungcheong (List)	Shin Yong-han	신용한		1 July 2026 (33 days)	Governor	Democratic	
South Chungcheong (List)	Park Soo-hyun	박수현		1 July 2026 (33 days)	Governor	Democratic	
North Gyeongsang (List)	Lee Cheol-woo	이철우		1 July 2018 (8 years, 33 days)	Governor	People Power	
South Gyeongsang (List)	Park Wan-su	박완수		1 July 2022 (4 years, 33 days)	Governor	People Power	
Special Self-Governing Province					Governor		
Jeju (List)	Wi Seong-gon	위성곤		1 July 2026 (33 days)	Governor	Democratic	
Gangwon (List)	Woo Sang-ho	우상호		1 July 2026 (33 days)	Governor	Democratic	
North Jeolla (List)	Lee Won-taeg	이원택		1 July 2026 (33 days)	Governor	Democratic	

== See also ==
- Administrative divisions of South Korea
- Elections in South Korea
