= Nowon C =

Constituency in Seoul, South Korea, 2004–2024

- Former Single-member constituency for the National Assembly
- Location of the constituency
- District(s): Nowon District (part)
- Region: Seoul
- Electorate: 151,435 (2020)

Former constituency
- Created: 2004
- Abolished: 2024
- Seats: 1
- Party: Democratic Party
- Member: Kim Sung-whan (last)
- Council constituency: Nowon 5th district
- Created from: Nowon B
- Replaced by: Nowon B

Nowon C (Korean: 노원구 병) was a constituency of the National Assembly of South Korea that existed from 2004 to 2024. The constituency consisted of part of Nowon District, Seoul. As of 2020, 151,435 eligible voters were registered in the constituency.

== List of members of the National Assembly ==
Election	Member	Party	Dates	Notes
2004	Lim Chae-jung	Uri	2004–2008	Acting Chairman of the Uri Party (2005); Speaker of the National Assembly (2006–2008)
2008	Hong Jung-wook	Grand National	2008–2012	
2012	Roh Hoe-chan	Unified Progressive	2012–2013	Floor leader of the Justice Party (2016–2018)
2013 by-election	Ahn Cheol-soo	Independent	2013–2017	Co-leader of the New Politics Alliance for Democracy (2014); Co-leader of the People's Party (2016) (2016); Leader of the People's Party (2016) (2017–2018); Leader of the People's Party (2020) (2020–2022)
2016	Ahn Cheol-soo	People	2013–2017	Co-leader of the New Politics Alliance for Democracy (2014); Co-leader of the People's Party (2016) (2016); Leader of the People's Party (2016) (2017–2018); Leader of the People's Party (2020) (2020–2022)
2018 by-election	Kim Sung-whan	Democratic	2018–2024	Mayor of Nowon (2010–2018); Minister of Climate, Energy and Environment (2025–)
2020	Kim Sung-whan	Democratic	2018–2024	Mayor of Nowon (2010–2018); Minister of Climate, Energy and Environment (2025–)
2024	constituency abolished			

== Election results ==
=== 2020 ===
Legislative Election 2020: Nowon C
Party	Candidate	Votes	%	±%
Democratic	Kim Sung-whan	55,556	53.15	−3.28
United Future	Lee Jun-seok	46,373	44.36	+2.65
Justice	Lee Nam-soo	1,645	1.57	new
Minjung	Kim Seon-gyeong	551	0.52	new
National Revolutionary	Kim Gwang-cheol	400	0.38	new
Rejected ballots		890	–	–
Turnout		105,415	69.61	+7.99
Registered electors		151,435		
Democratic hold		Swing		

=== 2018 (by-election) ===
By-election 2018: Nowon C
Party	Candidate	Votes	%	±%
Democratic	Kim Sung-whan	51,817	56.4	+42.5
Bareunmirae	Lee Jun-seok	25,001	27.2	−4.1
Liberty Korea	Kang Youn-jae	13,297	14.5	−16.8
Independent	Choi Chang-woo	1,075	1.2	new
Democracy and Peace	Kim Yoon-ho	622	0.7	new
Rejected ballots		2,092	–	–
Turnout		93,904	61.6	−3.3
Registered electors		152,393		
Democratic gain from Bareunmirae		Swing		

=== 2016 ===
Legislative Election 2016: Nowon C
Party	Candidate	Votes	%	±%
People	Ahn Cheol-soo	53,930	52.3	−8.2
Saenuri	Lee Jun-seok	32,285	31.3	−1.5
Democratic	Hwang Chang-hwa	14,370	13.9	new
Justice	Joo Hee-joon	1,911	1.9	−3.8
People's United	Chung Tae-heung	294	0.3	−0.5
Republic of Korea Party	Na Ki-hwan	265	0.3	+0.1
Rejected ballots		656	–	–
Turnout		103,711	64.9	+21.4
Registered electors		159,717		
People hold		Swing		

=== 2013 (by-election) ===
By-election 2013: Nowon C
Party	Candidate	Votes	%	±%
Independent	Ahn Cheol-soo	42,581	60.5	new
Saenuri	Heo Jun-young	23,090	32.8	−6.8
Justice	Kim Ji-sun	4,036	5.7	new
Unified Progressive	Chung Tae-heung	553	0.8	−56.4
Independent	Na Ki-hwan	161	0.2	new
Rejected ballots		110	–	–
Turnout		70,531	43.5	−13.1
Registered electors		162,182		
Independent gain from Justice		Swing		

=== 2012 ===
Legislative Election 2012: Nowon C
Party	Candidate	Votes	%	±%
Unified Progressive	Roh Hoe-chan	52,270	57.2	+17.1
Saenuri	Heo Jun-young	36,201	39.6	−3.5
Korea Vision	Joo Joon-hee	2,889	3.2	new
Rejected ballots		756	–	–
Turnout		92,116	56.6	+5.6
Registered electors		162,890		
Unified Progressive gain from Saenuri		Swing		

=== 2008 ===
Legislative Election 2008: Nowon C
Party	Candidate	Votes	%	±%
Grand National	Hong Jung-wook	34,554	43.1	+6.1
New Progressive	Roh Hoe-chan	32,111	40.1	new
United Democratic	Kim Sung-whan	13,036	16.3	new
Rejected ballots		–	–	–
Turnout		80,170	51.0	−12.2
Registered electors		158,354		
Grand National gain from Democratic		Swing		

=== 2004 ===
Legislative Election 2004: Nowon C
Party	Candidate	Votes	%	±%
Uri	Lim Chae-jung	44,923	45.2	new
Grand National	Kim Jung-ki	36,738	37.0	new
Millennium Democratic	Lee Dong-sup	9,894	10.0	new
Democratic Labor	Jin Sang-woo	6,795	6.8	new
United Liberal Democrats	Song Jae-ho	999	1.0	new
Rejected ballots		717	–	–
Turnout		100,066	63.2	
Registered electors		158,338		
Uri win (new seat)				

== See also ==
- List of constituencies of the National Assembly of South Korea
