= Woo Won-shik =

South Korean politician (born 1957)

The Right Honourable Woo Won-shik
- 우원식
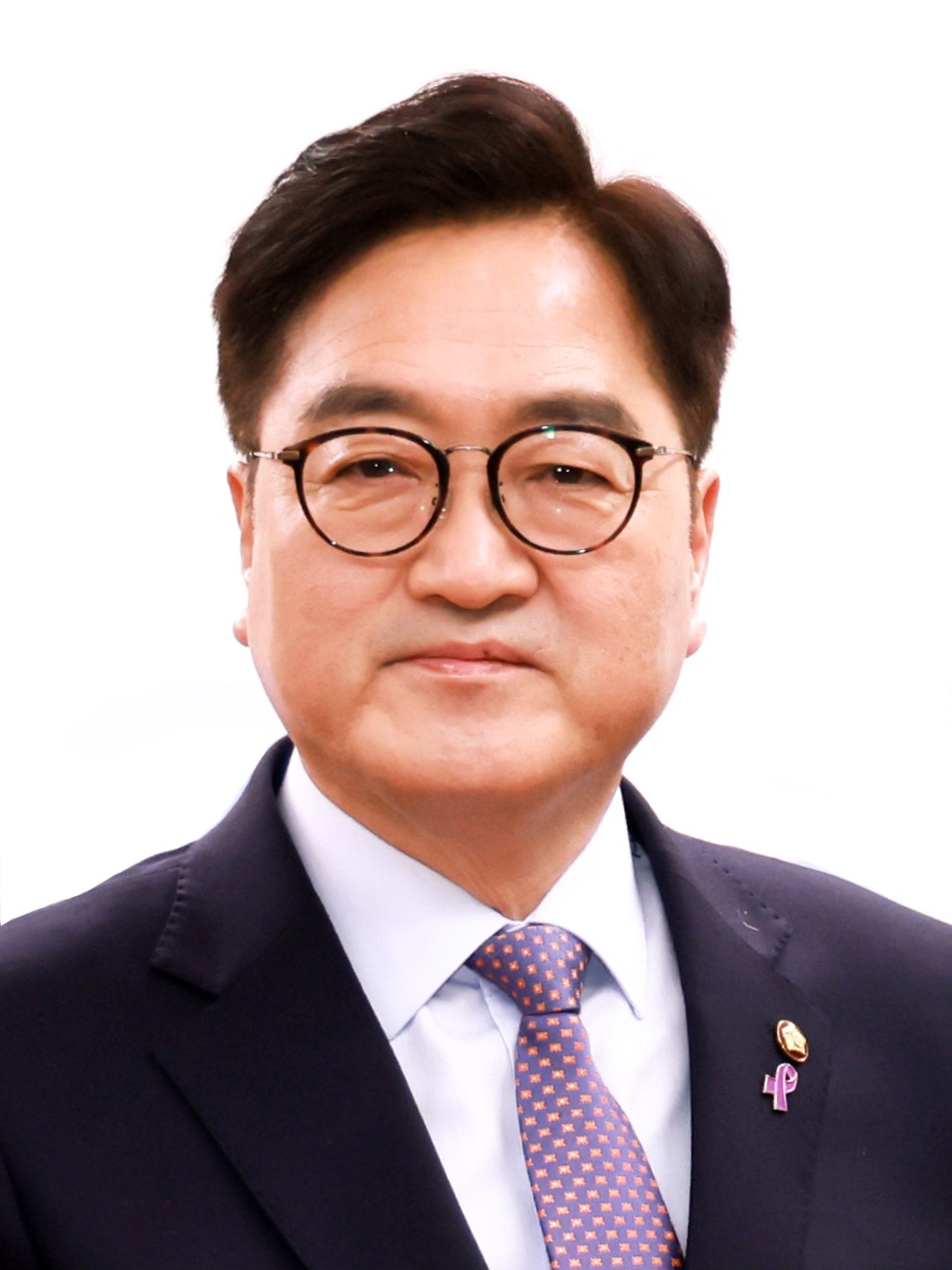
- Woo in 2025

Speaker of the National Assembly
- In office 5 June 2024 – 29 May 2026
- Deputy: Lee Hack-young; Joo Ho-young
- Preceded by: Kim Jin-pyo
- Succeeded by: Cho Jeong-sik

Member of the National Assembly
- Incumbent
- Assumed office 30 May 2012
- Preceded by: Kwon Young-jin
- Constituency: Nowon B (Seoul, 2012–2024); Nowon A (Seoul, 2024–present)
- In office 30 May 2004 – 29 May 2008
- Preceded by: Lim Chae-jung
- Succeeded by: Kwon Young-jin
- Constituency: Nowon B (Seoul)

Personal details
- Born: 18 September 1957 (age 69) Seongdong, Seoul, South Korea
- Party: Democratic (2015)
- Other political affiliations: See list: PDP (1988–1991); NUDP (1991); Democratic (1991) (1991–1995); Independent (1995); NCNP (1995–2000); Democratic (2000–2003); Independent (2003); Uri (2003–2007); GUDNP (2007–2008); UDP (2008); Democratic (2008) (2008–2011); DUP (2011–2013); Democratic (2013) (2013–2014); NPAD (2014–2015); Democratic (2015) (2015–2024); Independent (2024–2026)
- Education: Yonsei University (BS, MS); Chonnam National University (Hon. Ph.D. in Philosophy, 2025)
- Website: 우원식.kr

Korean name
- Hangul: 우원식
- Hanja: 禹元植
- RR: U Wonsik
- MR: U Wŏnsik
- Woo Won-shik's voice Woo Won-shik announcing the rejection of the first impeachment motion of President Yoon Suk Yeol; Recorded 7 December 2024

Woo Won-shik (Korean: 우원식; born 18 September 1957) is a South Korean politician who served as the speaker of the 22nd National Assembly of South Korea from June 2024 to May 2026. He was a member of the National Assembly for Nowon, Seoul from 2004 to 2008 and returned to office in 2012. He was a member of Democratic Party of Korea prior to his election as speaker in 2024. As speaker, he led the National Assembly's response to the martial law crisis and the subsequent impeachments of President Yoon Suk Yeol and Acting President Han Duck-soo.

== Early life and education ==
Woo was born in Seoul in 1957 and studied civil engineering at Yonsei University, later receiving a master's degree in environmental studies from the same university. He was arrested in 1981 and sentenced to three years of penal labor under the Chun Doo-hwan regime for taking part in protests demanding Chun's resignation, then released in 1984.

== Election results ==
Year	Elections	Constituency	Political party	Votes (%)	Results
1991	1991 Local Election	Seoul Nowon 4th (Seoul Metropolitan Council)	NUDP	8,503 (36.71%)	Defeated (2nd)
1995	1st Local Election	Seoul Nowon 3rd (Seoul Metropolitan Council)	Democratic (1991)	17,037 (55.44%)	Won
2004	17th National Assembly General Election	Nowon B (Seoul)	Uri	44,720 (41.51%)	Won
2008	18th National Assembly General Election	Nowon B (Seoul)	UDP	38,104 (44.05%)	Defeated (2nd)
2012	19th National Assembly General Election	Nowon B (Seoul)	DUP	50,844 (49.72%)	Won
2016	20th National Assembly General Election	Nowon B (Seoul)	Democratic (2015)	55,687 (51.95%)	Won
2020	21st National Assembly General Election	Nowon B (Seoul)	Democratic (2015)	71,708 (62.67%)	Won
2024	22nd National Assembly General Election	Nowon A (Seoul)	Democratic (2015)	91,986 (58.99%)	Won

== Career ==
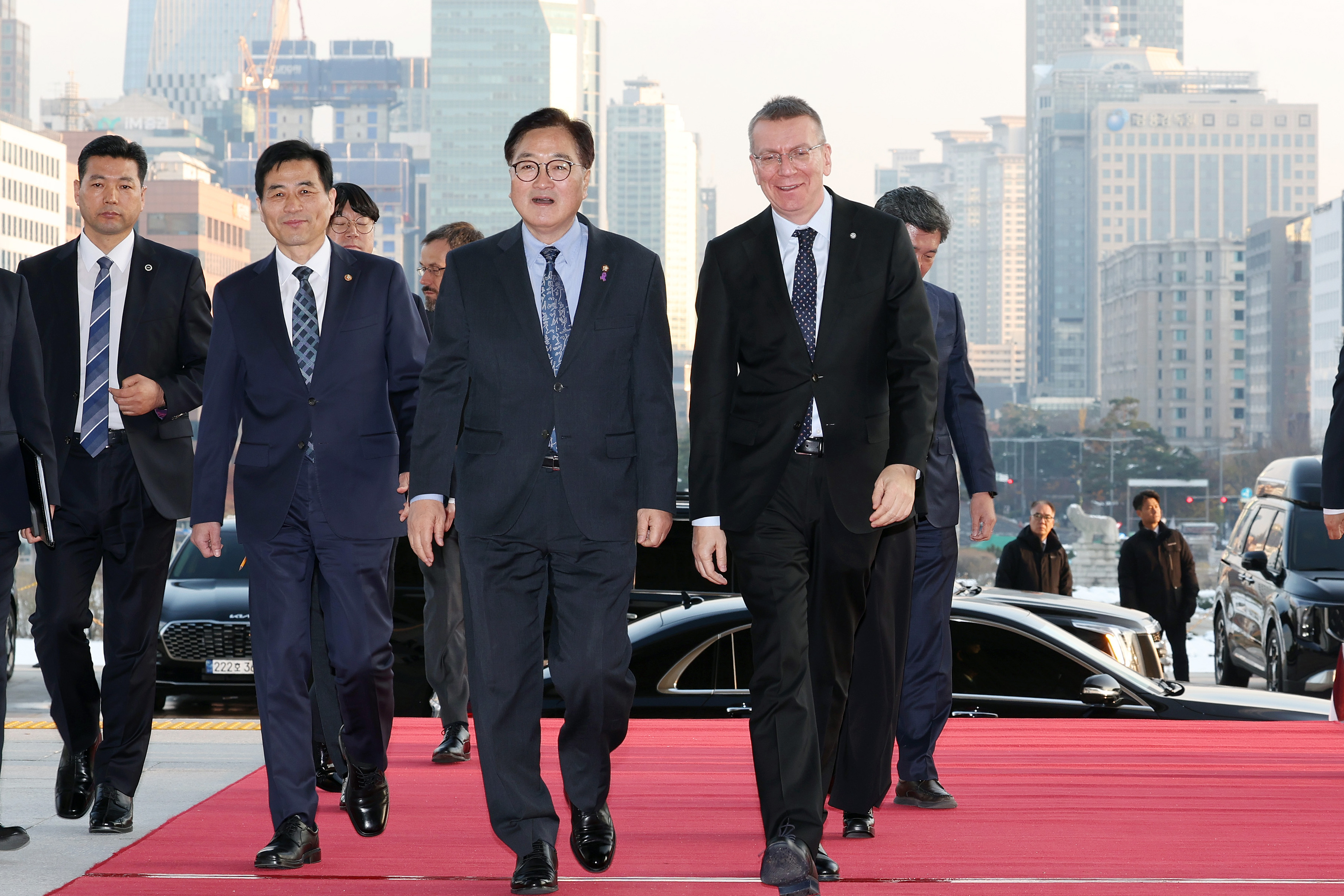
Woo and Latvian President Edgars Rinkēvičs in Seoul, November 2024

Woo was elected to the National Assembly in 2004 as an Uri Party candidate in the Nowon B constituency in Seoul. Early in his Assembly career, Woo pressed for the abolition of South Korea's National Security Law, and attacked the Supreme Court in 2004 for backing the permanence of the law. Later, in 2007, he criticized the U.S. armed forces in Korea for the poor environmental conditions on American military bases. He ran unsuccessfully for chairman of the United New Democratic Party in the leadership election on 9 January 2008, losing to Sohn Hak-kyu. He lost his seat in the 2008 elections, but stood successfully in the next elections in 2012.

As an assemblyman, Woo has been active in promoting labor rights. He is a member of the Assembly's Environment and Labor Committee. In 2007, he presided over the unanimous approval of a bill to allow academics at private universities to organize unions. Following his re-entry to the Assembly, in 2013 he established the Committee for Improving the Standing of the Have-Nots or "Euljiro Committee", a group that mediates industrial disputes and works to protect workers' rights. He has served as the Committee's chairman since its founding.

Woo has served in a number of important positions in the Democratic Party and its predecessors, including deputy floor leader and deputy secretary general. He is seen as independent of the party's pro–Roh Moo-hyun and Jeolla Province factions. Woo also acted as opposition administrator of the special hearing committee to vet the appointment of Hwang Kyo-ahn as Prime Minister in May–June 2015, with The Dong-A Ilbo describing him at this time as having a "strong, steely character".

Woo is notable for leading anti-Japanese campaigns, and has been described by rivals as a "Japan hawk." One notable campaign was a two-week hunger strike he undertook in July 2023 in protest of Japan's plan to discard wastewater from the quake-wrecked Fukushima nuclear power plant. He also opposed the International Atomic Energy Agency's verdict which found that Japan's plan was safe.

On 16 May 2024, Woo was elected Speaker of the 22nd South Korean National Assembly. He formally assumed the position after being officially elected on 5 June 2024.

Woo announcing the National Assembly voted 190–0 to end martial law

As speaker, Woo has presided over several important occasions such as the revocation by the National Assembly of the declaration of martial law by President Yoon Suk Yeol on 4 December 2024, during which he climbed a fence to get inside the National Assembly Proceeding Hall and refused to forgo standard procedures despite soldiers threatening to enter the session hall, and the passage of the impeachment motion against Yoon on 14 December. Opinion polling held by Gallup at the time also found him emerging as the most trusted politician in South Korea for his actions during martial law and the subsequent impeachment, with a rating of 56%.

On the eve of the impeachment of acting president Han Duck-soo, Woo ruled that Han can be impeached by a simple majority due to his status as a cabinet minister, paving the way for Han to be impeached by 192 MPs. Woo was overruled by South Korea's constitutional court three months later, who re-instated Han as acting president.

Woo considers pro-democracy activist and former Democratic United Party senior adviser Kim Geun-tae as his political mentor and is known to wear a lime-green tie given to him by Kim on matters of important significance.

In September 2025, Woo visited China and attended the 2025 China Victory Day Parade in Beijing, during which he said he briefly exchanged greetings and shook hands with North Korean General Secretary Kim Jong Un.

His term as Speaker ended on 29 May 2026, rejoining the Democratic Party the next day.

Political offices
Preceded by Kim Jin-pyo	Speaker of the National Assembly of South Korea; 5 June 2024–29 May 2026	Succeeded by Cho Jeong-sik
National Assembly of the Republic of Korea
Preceded by Ham Seung-hee (Nowon A, Seoul); Lim Chae-jung (Nowon B, Seoul)	Member of the National Assembly for Nowon B (Seoul); 30 May 2004–29 May 2008	Succeeded by Kwon Young-jin
Preceded by Kwon Young-jin	Member of the National Assembly for Nowon B (Seoul); 30 May 2012–29 May 2024	Succeeded by Himself (Nowon A, Seoul); Kim Sung-whan (Nowon B, Seoul)
Preceded by Koh Yong-jin (Nowon A, Seoul); Himself (Nowon B, Seoul)	Member of the National Assembly for Nowon A (Seoul); 29 May 2024–	Incumbent
Party political offices
Preceded by Woo Sang-ho	Floor Leader for Democratic Party; 16 May 2017–11 May 2018	Succeeded by Hong Young-pyo
