= Yeomposan =

Mountain in Ulsan, South Korea

Highest point
- Elevation: 203 m (666 ft)
- Coordinates: 35°31′16″N 129°24′32″E

Geography
- Location: Ulsan, South Korea

Korean name
- Hangul: 염포산
- Hanja: 鹽浦山
- RR: Yeomposan
- MR: Yŏmp'osan

Yeomposan is a mountain in Buk District, Ulsan, South Korea. It has an elevation of 203 m (666 ft).

== See also ==
- Geography of South Korea
- List of mountains in Korea
- List of mountains by elevation
