= Chung Bong-ju =

South Korean politician (born 1960)

- 정봉주(鄭鳳柱)
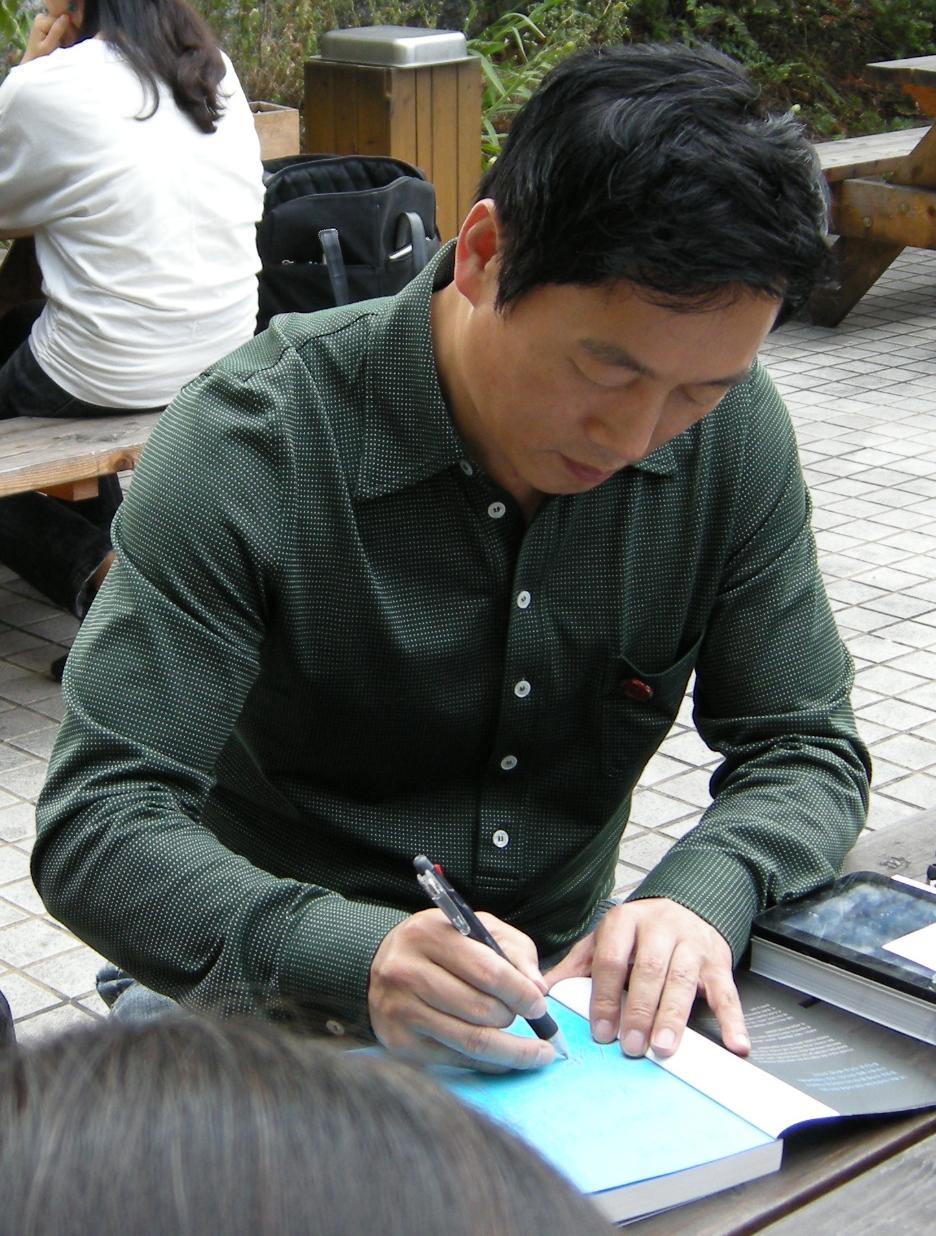
- Chung Bong-ju in 2011

Member of the National Assembly
- In office 30 May 2004 – 29 May 2008
- Preceded by: Ham Seung-hee
- Succeeded by: Hyun Kyung-byung
- Constituency: Nowon A (Seoul)

Personal details
- Born: 2 July 1960 (age 66) Nohae-myeon, Yangju County, South Korea
- Party: Independent
- Other political affiliations: NUDP (1991); Democratic (1991) (1991–1995); Independent (1995, 2003, 2012–2019); National Congress (1995–2000); Millennium Democratic (2000–2003); Uri (2003–2007); UNDP (2007–2008); UDP (2008); Democratic (2008) (2008–2011); DUP (2011–2012); Democratic (2015) (2019–2020, 2022–2026); ODP (2020–2022)
- Spouse: Song Ji-young
- Children: 2
- Education: Yonsei University; University of California, Riverside
- Occupation: Broadcaster, politician

Chung Bong-ju (Korean: 정봉주, born 2 July 1960) is a South Korean politician and the former Member of the National Assembly for Seoul Nowon A constituency from 2004 to 2008.

Chung is widely known as a "sniper" against the former President Lee Myung-bak, for harshly criticising him regarding the controversies. Due to this, he was charged for slandering and jailed for a year in 2011. He returned to politics after pardoned by the new President Moon Jae-in in December 2017. He soon planned to join the Democratic Party before launching his bid for Seoul mayorship; the party rejected his bid due to the controversies related to sexual harassment.

== Early life and family ==
Chung Bong-ju was born in Nohae-myeon, Yangju, Gyeonggi (now Gongneung-dong, Nowon District, Seoul) in 1960. His father, Chung Jang-duck (died in 1991), was a policeman. One of his cousin is currently in North Korea, whom he met in Mount Kumgang in 2009. He is a descendant of Chŏng Tojŏn.

He married Song Ji-young. Both has a son and a daughter.

== Education ==
Chung studied English at Hankuk University of Foreign Studies. He also attained a master's degree in education from Yonsei University. He also studied at Reserve Officers' Training Corps (ROTC), advised by his father, but was suspended from the institution for organising a demonstration in 1983. As he was jailed for 1.5 years, he was only able to complete his university life in 1985.

In 1989, Chung moved to the United States and acquired a TESOL from University of California, Riverside.

== Career ==
Following the graduation, Chung briefly worked at Monthly Mal, the magazine of the Citizens' Coalition for Democratic Media. During this time, he used the pseudonym, Chung Shi-jin (정시진). In 1991, he ran as a Member of the Seoul Metropolitan Council under the banner of the New Democratic Unionist Party but lost. After the defeat, he operated an English language institute named Hankuk University of Foreign Studies Language Institute, till he was elected to the National Assembly in 2004 election.

Chung withdrew from the Uri Party in 2007 to endorse Sohn Hak-kyu as the government presidential candidate for upcoming presidential election. When the party was re-founded as the United New Democratic Party, he joined the party but at the presidential preselection, Sohn lost to Chung Dong-young.

=== "Sniper" against Lee Myung-bak ===
During the presidential election in 2007, Chung criticised Lee Myung-bak, the presidential candidate of the main opposition Grand National Party (now United Future Party) who was later elected, bringing up controversies, mainly BBK stock price manipulation incident. This gave him a nickname "Sniper against Lee Myung-bak" (이명박 저격수) or "Sniper against BBK" (BBK 저격수).

His activities were condemned by the GNP, who proposed to file a lawsuit against him. Following the election, the GNP finally took actions against him for slandering, in which he was sentenced for a year of imprisonment. He appealed for 2 times, but on 22 December 2011, the Supreme Court confirmed 1-year imprisonment for him. As he was jailed, he was banned from politics for 10 years from the time of the final sentence. At that time, he was preparing to run for 2012 election.

At prison, he was put in solitary confinement, which he described as "too small" till unable to stretch his two arms, as well as only left 30 centimetres from head and feet when he laid down to sleep. He also added his wife frequently visited him, around 2 to 3 days per week. In those days, he exercised to build muscles and later wrote several books talking about it.

He was released on 25 December 2012, shortly after the presidential election. Despite consecutive defeats for the Democratic Unionist Party at the general and presidential elections, he urged his supporters to not be frustrated.

=== Return to politics ===
On 29 December 2017, Chung was officially pardoned by the newly elected President Moon Jae-in. He expressed his gratitude to his supporters and the President on Twitter.

Finally being pardoned!~
Will there be a day like today? I can't still realise it.
I would like to say thank you for all citizens who brightened the Plaza last winter, as well as those who concerned me.
Thank you so much, Mr. President.

On 7 February 2018, Chung announced to join the Democratic Party to launch his bid for Seoul mayorship at the upcoming local elections. The source also reported that he had set up an office in Yeouido to prepare for his plan. He scheduled to officially declare on 7 March at Gyeongui Line Forest Park, but on that day, he postponed it following a report of Pressian that he molested a female university student. On 19 March, his request to join the Democratic Party was officially rejected. 9 days later, he officially withdrew his bid and declared to retire from politics.

On the other hand, on 6 December 2019, Yonhap News reported that the Democratic Party had already approved his application request on 28 November. Regarding the party's controversial "secret" decision, Chung mentioned that it was in order to not burden the party. He soon launched his bid to run for Seoul Gangseo 1st constituency for 2020 election but was disqualified by the party due to controversies.

On 28 February 2020, Chung announced he would form a new party named Open Democratic Party. He denounced the current Democratic Party as "not the real Democrats" for adopting conservative approaches and not properly reacting against the oppositions. While the party was criticised as the "satellite party" to the Democratic Party, he denied it. He also added he would not stand for upcoming general election.

== Controversy ==
On 6 March 2018, Pressian interviewed a female journalist who revealed that she was sexually harassed by Chung while she was a university student on 23 December 2011, 3 days before Chung was jailed. According to her, both of them met at his speech on 1 November when she approached him to take a photo together. Both shared their contact numbers and soon, their relationship became closer. However, she continued that he then persistently sent messages, till she and her friends felt so uncomfortable.

On 23 December, the day after he was sentenced 1-year jail, Chung again contacted her to meet at Lexington Hotel Yeouido (now Kensington Hotel) as he really wanted to see her before entering to prison. She accepted his request as she felt a sympathy for him. The room was, however, was booked under the name of 3rd party, neither Chung nor her. After both entered to a room, he asked her several questions i.e. "Do you have boyfriend?" and soon hugged and tried to kiss her. She immediately ran away from the room.

After the article was widely shared in South Korean society, he subsequently denied the sexual harassment while accepting the truth that both of them went to the hotel. He harshly denounced the woman for "writing a perfect novel" but shortly after that, he added he had never been to the hotel at that time. Soon after, Pressian wrote the refutation articles.

On 12 March 2018, Chung castigated the Pressian's article as a "lie" and the next day, he filed a lawsuit against journalists who reported the case. However, after a fortnight, he dropped the charge following the report that he purchased using his own card at Lexington Hotel on 23 December 2011. The next day, he announced his retirement from politics.

The prosecution demanded an imprisonment of 10 months and a penalty of 2 million KRW (≒ 1,300 GBP), although he was acquitted at the first trial on 25 October 2019.

== Election results ==
=== General elections ===
Year	Elections	Constituency	Political party	Votes (%)	Remarks
2004	17th National Assembly General Election	Nowon A (Seoul)	Uri	36,992 (42.70%)	Won
2008	18th National Assembly General Election	Nowon A (Seoul)	UDP	26,251 (37.62%)	Defeated (2nd)

=== Local elections ===
==== Seoul Metropolitan Council ====
Year	Elections	Constituency	Political party	Votes (%)	Remarks
1991	1991 Iocal Election	Seoul Nowon 3rd	NDUP	4,769 (39.03%)	Defeated (2nd)
