= Kim Sung-hwan =

Kim Sung-hwan (김성환), a.k.a. Kim Seong-hwan, Kim Sǒng-hwan may refer to:

- Kim Seong-hwan (pen name Gobau; born 1932), Korean cartoonist
- Kim Sung-hwan (diplomat) (born 1953), South Korean foreign minister and diplomat
- Kim Sung-hwan (footballer) (born 1986), South Korean footballer
- Kim Sung-hwan (Environmental minister), South Korean politician
