= Nowon B =

Constituency in Seoul, South Korea

- Single-member constituency for the National Assembly
- Location of the constituency
- District(s): Nowon District (part)
- Region: Seoul
- Electorate: 211,043 (2024)

Current constituency
- Created: 1988
- Seats: 1
- Party: Democratic Party
- Member: Kim Sung-whan
- Created from: Dobong

Nowon B (Korean: 노원구 을) is a constituency of the National Assembly of South Korea. The constituency consists of parts of Nowon District, Seoul. As of 2024, 211,043 eligible voters were registered in the constituency. The constituency was created in 1988 from the Dobong constituency.

== History ==
Since its establishment, Nowon B has elected members of the Democratic Party and predecessor parties in all but two elections and is thus regarded as a stronghold for the Democratic Party.

Kim Yong-chae of the right-wing New Democratic Republican Party was the first member to represent Nowon B, narrowly defeating Lim Chae-jung of the centre-left Peace Democratic Party by a little over 1,000 votes. In the following election, Kim Yong-chae had initially won re-election by a margin of thirty-six votes. However, after it was discovered that a bundle of one hundred votes were mixed up and not counted properly, a recount was performed. The recount declared Lim Chae-jung of the centre-left Democratic Party the winner with only 172 votes separating him from incumbent Kim Yong-chae. Lim won re-election in 1996 and 2000, but did not stand for re-election for Nowon B in 2004, running as the Uri Party candidate for the newly created Nowon C constituency instead. Lim was succeeded by Woo Won-shik of the Uri Party who defeated Kwon Young-jin of the centre-right Grand National Party. In a return match held at the next election, Kwon Young-jin defeated Woo, garnering 49.93% of the vote while Woo received 44.09%. In the 2012 election, Woo and Kwon faced off again; Woo ended up narrowly defeating incumbent Kwon Young-jin by a margin of 1.78%. Woo comfortably won re-election in 2016 and 2020, receiving 51.95 and 62.67% of the vote respectively.

Ahead of the 2024 South Korean legislative election, the Nowon C constituency was abolished as a result of a decrease in population in Nowon District. Incumbent member Woo Won-shik ran in the Nowon A constituency after beating incumbent Koh Yong-jin in a primary and Nowon C incumbent Kim Sung-whan was nominated as the Democratic Party's candidate for Nowon B. Kim Sung-whan went on to win in the general election with 58.51% of the vote.

== Boundaries ==
The constituency encompasses Junggye 1-dong, Junggye 4-dong, and Sanggye-dong. It borders the constituencies of Uijeongbu B to the north, Dobong A and Dobong B to the west, Nowon A to the south, and Namyangju B to the east.

== List of members of the National Assembly ==
Election	Member	Party	Dates	Notes
1988	Kim Yong-chae	New Democratic Republican	1988–1992	Minister of Special Affairs (1992); Mayor of Nowon (1996–1998); Chief of Staff to the Prime Minister of South Korea (1999–2000); Minister of Construct and Transport (2001)
1992	Lim Chae-jung	Democratic	1992–2004	Acting Chairman Uri Party (2005); Speaker of the National Assembly (2006–2008)
1996	Lim Chae-jung	National Congress	1992–2004	Acting Chairman Uri Party (2005); Speaker of the National Assembly (2006–2008)
2000	Lim Chae-jung	Millennium Democratic	1992–2004	Acting Chairman Uri Party (2005); Speaker of the National Assembly (2006–2008)
2004	Woo Won-shik	Uri	2004–2008	
2008	Kwon Young-jin	Grand National	2008–2012	Deputy Mayor for Political Affairs Seoul (2006–2007); Mayor of Daegu (2014–2022)
2012	Woo Won-shik	Democratic United	2012–2024	Floor leader of Democratic Party (2017–2018); Speaker of the National Assembly (2024–2026)
2016	Woo Won-shik	Democratic	2012–2024	Floor leader of Democratic Party (2017–2018); Speaker of the National Assembly (2024–2026)
2020	Woo Won-shik	Democratic	2012–2024	Floor leader of Democratic Party (2017–2018); Speaker of the National Assembly (2024–2026)
2024	Kim Sung-whan	Democratic	2024–present	Mayor of Nowon (2010–2018); Minister of Climate Energy and Environment (2025–)

== Election results ==
=== 2024 ===
Legislative Election 2024: Nowon B
Party	Candidate	Votes	%	±%
Democratic	Kim Sung-whan	85,721	58.51	▼4.16
People Power	Kim Jun-ho	57,515	39.26	▲2.74
Independent	Lee Chang-young	3,259	2.22	new
Rejected ballots		1,626	–	
Turnout		148,121	70.19	▼1.37
Registered electors		211,043		
Democratic hold		Swing		

=== 2020 ===
Legislative Election 2020: Nowon B
Party	Candidate	Votes	%	±%
Democratic	Woo Won-shik	71,708	62.67	▲10.72
United Future	Lee Dong-sup	41,792	36.52	▲6.64
National Revolutionary	Cha Dong-ihk	906	0.79	new
Rejected ballots		1,382	–	
Turnout		115,788	71.56	▲6.83
Registered electors		163,736		
Democratic hold		Swing		

=== 2016 ===
Legislative Election 2016: Nowon B
Party	Candidate	Votes	%	±%
Democratic	Woo Won-shik	55,687	51.95	▲2.23
Saenuri	Hong Bum-sik	32,026	29.88	▼18.06
People	Hwang Sang-mo	19,462	18.15	new
Rejected ballots		1,176	–	
Turnout		108,351	64.73	▲3.48
Registered electors		167,383		
Democratic hold		Swing		

=== 2012 ===
Legislative Election 2012: Nowon B
Party	Candidate	Votes	%	±%
Democratic United	Woo Won-shik	50,844	49.72	▲5.63
Saenuri	Kwon Young-jin	49,026	47.94	▼1.99
Liberty Forward	Lee Ki-jae	1,198	1.17	new
Korea Vision	Jeon Yeong-don	733	0.71	new
People’s Happiness	Lee Sun-yup	445	0.43	new
Rejected ballots		554	–	
Turnout		102,800	61.25	▲8.81
Registered electors		167,833		
Democratic United gain from Saenuri		Swing		

=== 2008 ===
Legislative Election 2008: Nowon B
Party	Candidate	Votes	%	±%
Grand National	Kwon Young-jin	43,150	49.93	▲10.32
United Democratic	Woo Won-shik	38,104	44.09	new
Democratic Labor	Cho Hyun-sil	4,182	4.83	▼3.99
National Defense	Koh Jin-mok	593	0.68	new
Family Party for Peace and Unity	Yeo Suk-dong	385	0.44	new
Rejected ballots		612	–	
Turnout		87,026	52.44	▼13.91
Registered electors		165,955		
Grand National gain from United Democratic		Swing		

=== 2004 ===
Legislative Election 2004: Nowon B
Party	Candidate	Votes	%	±%
Uri	Woo Won-shik	44,720	41.51	new
Grand National	Kwon Young-jin	42,677	39.61	▲2.56
Democratic Labor	Lee Sang-hyun	9,511	8.82	▲2.88
Millennium Democratic	Lim Rae-kyu	7,249	6.72	▼34.39
United Liberal Democrats	Ahn Dae-ryun	1,200	1.11	▼6.01
Independent	Cho Jong-man	2,374	2.20	new
Rejected ballots		732	–	
Turnout		108,463	66.35	▲12.48
Registered electors		163,462		
Uri hold		Swing		

=== 2000 ===
Legislative Election 2000: Nowon B
Party	Candidate	Votes	%	±%
Millennium Democratic	Lim Chae-jung	47,815	41.11	new
Grand National	Chang Doo-hwan	43,091	37.05	▲10.37
United Liberal Democrats	Park Byung-il	8,279	7.12	▼19.27
Democratic Labor	Chung Yun-kwang	6,910	5.94	new
Independent	Lee Dal-won	3,842	3.30	new
Democratic People's	Lee Dong-sup	3,224	2.78	new
Independent	Chung Sun-bae	1,663	1.43	new
Youth Progressive	Kim Sun-wook	1,481	1.27	new
Rejected ballots		953	–	
Turnout		117,258	53.87	▼9.77
Registered electors		217,658		
Millennium Democratic hold		Swing		

=== 1996 ===
Legislative Election 1996: Nowon B
Party	Candidate	Votes	%	±%
National Congress	Lim Chae-jung	41,615	33.25	new
New Korea	Park Jong-sun	33,396	26.68	▼6.23
United Liberal Democrats	Kim Yong-chae	33,026	26.39	new
Democratic	Lee Moon-ok	15,879	12.68	new
Non-Partisan National Association	Koo Pan-hong	1,224	0.97	new
Rejected ballots		1,612	–	
Turnout		126,752	63.64	▼7.57
Registered electors		199,183		
National Congress hold		Swing		

=== 1992 ===
Legislative Election 1992: Nowon B
Party	Candidate	Votes	%	±%
Democratic	Lim Chae-jung (Note: Declared the winner after a recount; won by a margin of 172 votes)	40,515	32.88	new
Democratic Liberal	Kim Yong-chae	40,551	32.91	new
Unification National	Hong Sung-woo	29,621	24.04	new
Independent	Oh Sae-chul	9,181	7.45	new
New Political Reform	Jeon Dae-yeol	2,589	2.10	–
Independent	Chang Sung-wook	743	0.6	new
Rejected ballots		1,092	–	
Turnout		124,292	71.21	▲1.75
Registered electors		174,554		
Democratic gain from Democratic Liberal		Swing		

=== 1988 ===
Legislative Election 1988: Nowon B
Party	Candidate	Votes	%	±%
New Democratic Republican	Kim Yong-chae	31,150	30.79	–
Peace Democratic	Lim Chae-jung	30,346	29.99	–
Reunification Democratic	Shin Doo-hee	21,028	20.78	–
Democratic Justice	Kwon Oh-joo	16,161	15.97	–
Our Justice	Chung Sun-bae	2,474	2.44	–
Rejected ballots		1,028	–	
Turnout		102,187	69.46	–
Registered electors		147,108		
New Democratic Republican win (new seat)				

== See also ==
- List of constituencies of the National Assembly of South Korea
