= Buk, Ulsan (constituency) =

Constituency in Ulsan, South Korea

- Single-member constituency for the National Assembly
- Location of the constituency
- District(s): Buk District, Ulsan
- Region: Ulsan
- Electorate: 176,056 (2024)

Current constituency
- Created: 2000
- Seats: 1
- Party: Progressive Party
- Member(s): Yoon Jong-oh
- Created from: Ulju, Ulsan; Jung, Ulsan

Buk, Ulsan (Korean: 울산광역시 북구) is a constituency of the National Assembly of South Korea. The constituency consists of Buk District, Ulsan. As of 2024, 176,056 eligible voters were registered in the constituency.

== History ==
The constituency was established ahead of the 2000 South Korean legislative election from the former Ulju, Ulsan and Jung, Ulsan constituencies.

Unlike its neighboring constituencies, Buk, Ulsan is considered a swing constituency as it has elected representatives from progressive, liberal, and conservative parties. This swing characteristic can partially be attributed to the fact that a substantial portion of the constituency's voters are blue collar workers, who traditionally have a stronger tendency to vote for progressive and liberal parties.

== Boundaries ==
The constituency encompasses the neighborhoods of Nongso-dong, Gangdong-dong, Hyomun-dong, Songjeong-dong, Yangjeong-dong, and Yeompo-dong.

== List of members of the National Assembly ==
Election	Member	Party	Dates	Notes
2000	Yoon Doo-hwan	Grand National	2000-2004	
2004	Cho Seung-soo	Democratic Labor	2004-2005	Lost seat for illegal advertising before the election
2005 by-election	Yoon Doo-hwan	Grand National	2005-2009	Lost seat for illegally receiving campaign funds
2008	Yoon Doo-hwan	Grand National	2005-2009	Lost seat for illegally receiving campaign funds
2009 by-election	Cho Seung-soo	New Progressive	2009-2012	
2012	Park Dae-dong	Saenuri	2012-2016	
2016	Yoon Jong-oh	Independent	2016-2017	
2018 by-election	Lee Sang-heon	Democratic (Note: Independent since February 28, 2024)	2018-present	Left the Democratic Party on February 28, 2024
2020	Lee Sang-heon	Democratic	2018-present	Left the Democratic Party on February 28, 2024
2024	Yoon Jong-oh	Progressive	2024-present	The Progressive Party's only constituency seat

== Election results ==
=== 2024 ===
Legislative Election 2024: Buk, Ulsan
Party	Candidate	Votes	%	±%
Progressive	Yoon Jong-oh (Note: Democratic–Progressive unified candidate)	63,188	55.12	new
People Power	Park Dae-dong	49,155	42.88	+1.99
Independent	Park Jae-mook	2277	1.98	new
Rejected ballots		2,045	–	–
Turnout		116,665	66.4	−1.76
Registered electors		176,056		
Progressive gain from Independent		Swing		

=== 2020 ===
Legislative Election 2020: Buk, Ulsan
Party	Candidate	Votes	%	±%
Democratic	Lee Sang-heon	54,215	46.34	−2.13
United Future	Park Dae-dong	47,836	40.89	+11.68
Justice	Kim Jin-young	11,571	9.89	new
Minsaeng	Kim Do-hyeon	1,120	0.95	new
Independent	Park Yeong-soo	923	0.78	new
National Revolutionary Dividends	Choi Hyeong-joon	761	0.65	new
Independent	Park Jae-mook	552	0.47	new
Rejected ballots		1,356	–	–
Turnout		118,334	68.16	
Registered electors		173,616		
Democratic hold		Swing		

=== 2018 by-election ===
2018 by-election: Buk, Ulsan
Party	Candidate	Votes	%	±%
Democratic	Lee Sang-heon	49,647	48.47	new
Liberty Korea	Park Dae-dong	29,916	29.21	−9.29
Minjung	Kwon Oh-gil	14,974	14.62	new
Bareunmirae	Kang Seok-goo	6,094	5.95	new
Independent	Chung Jin-woo	1,093	1.07	new
Independent	Park Jae-mook	696	0.68	new
Rejected ballots		1,690	–	
Turnout		104,110	65.53	–
Registered electors		158,879		
Democratic gain from Independent		Swing		

=== 2016 ===
Legislative Election 2016: Buk, Ulsan
Party	Candidate	Votes	%	±%
Independent	Yoon Jong-oh (Note: Ran as the unified opposition candidate against the ruling Saenuri Party)	55,621	61.49	new
Saenuri	Yoon Doo-hwan	34,831	38.50	−13.87
Rejected ballots		1,310	–	
Turnout		91,762	62.96	–
Registered electors		145,738		
Independent gain from Saenuri		Swing		

=== 2012 ===
Legislative Election 2012: Buk, Ulsan
Party	Candidate	Votes	%	±%
Saenuri	Park Dae-dong	40,116	52.37	+10.99
Unified Progressive	Kim Chang-hyeon	36,482	47.62	−1.59
Rejected ballots		715	–	
Turnout		77,313	58.25	–
Registered electors		132,715		
Saenuri gain from Unified Progressive		Swing		

=== 2009 by-election ===
2009 by-election: Buk, Ulsan
Party	Candidate	Votes	%	±%
New Progressive	Cho Seung-soo	25,346	49.21	new
Grand National	Park Dae-dong	21,313	41.38	−4.86
Independent	Kim Soo-heon	4,848	9.41	new
Rejected ballots		2,871	–	
Turnout		54,378	46.73	–
Registered electors		116,368		
New Progressive gain from Grand National		Swing		

=== 2008 ===
Legislative Election 2008: Buk, Ulsan
Party	Candidate	Votes	%	±%
Grand National	Yoon Doo-hwan	24,135	46.24	−2.85
Democratic Labor	Lee Young-hee	16,621	31.84	−13.67
Pro-Park	Choi Yoon-joo	10,977	21.03	new
Family Party for Peace and Unity	Jeon Byeong-il	465	0.89	new
Rejected ballots		444	–	
Turnout		52,642	47.82	–
Registered electors		110,077		
Grand National hold		Swing		

=== 2005 by-election ===
2005 by-election: Buk, Ulsan
Party	Candidate	Votes	%	±%
Grand National	Yoon Doo-hwan	24,628	49.09	+14.71
Democratic Labor	Chung Gap-deuk	22,835	45.51	−1.38
Uri	Park Jae-taek	2,711	5.40	−12.25
Rejected ballots		238	–	
Turnout		50,412	52.19	–
Registered electors		96,590		
Grand National gain from Democratic Labor		Swing		

=== 2004 ===
Legislative Election 2004: Buk, Ulsan
Party	Candidate	Votes	%	±%
Democratic Labor	Cho Seung-soo	27,212	46.89	+5.10
Grand National	Yoon Doo-hwan	19,952	34.38	−8.65
Uri	Lee Soo-dong	10,243	17.65	new
Korean Christian Party	Yeom Dong-ok	621	1.07	new
Rejected ballots		473	–	
Turnout		58,501	66.58	–
Registered electors		87,860		
Democratic Labor gain from Grand National		Swing		

=== 2000 ===
Legislative Election 2000: Buk, Ulsan
Party	Candidate	Votes	%	±%
Grand National	Yoon Doo-hwan	19,430	43.03	–
Democratic Labor	Choi Yong-gyu	18,867	41.79	–
Millennium Democratic	Lee Sang-heon	4,170	9.23	–
Democratic People's	Seo Dong-woo	2,684	5.94	–
Rejected ballots		1,448	–	
Turnout		45,700	60.41	–
Registered electors		75,413		
Grand National win (new seat)				

== See also ==
- List of constituencies of the National Assembly of South Korea
