= Herald Corporation =

South Korean media company

Herald Corporation (formally Herald Media; Korean: 헤럴드) is a South Korean media, education, and lifestyle company that provides a variety of contents and ecofriendly initiatives through its publications and subsidiaries. Founded in 1953, it is headquartered in Seoul, South Korea. It publishes The Korea Herald, Herald Business, Junior Herald, and Campus Herald. Over the past 60 plus years, Herald, through its publication such as The Korea Herald, Herald Business, and Junior Herald, has evolved into a unique media and lifestyle platform that places a strong emphasis on education, design, and sustainability.

The formation of Herald began with the founding of The Korea Herald, a daily English-language newspaper, In 1952, the newspaper 'Jeil Shinbo' was established, and in 1954, it was renamed to Industrial Economy Newspaper. Later, it was acquired by the Korea International Trade Association and became 'The daily Naewoe Economic Newspaper', and it was later renamed 'The Herald Business'.

In 2002, Ryan Jungwook Hong acquired the Herald Corporation and currently sits as the chairman of the group. Since its acquisition, the Herald has quickly expanded its businesses in other areas, namely the internet, broadcasting, magazines, education, and ecofriendly businesses such as Herald Ecochem, Organica, and Organica Day.

== History ==
=== 1950-1969: Founding, The Korea Herald ===
The Korea Herald began in August 1953 as The Korean Republic, a 4-page tabloid English-language daily. In 1958, The Korean Republic published its fifth anniversary issue of 84 pages, the largest ever in Korea. In 1962, The Korean Republic published its first daily educational supplement and launched the Korean Republic English Institute (the Korea Herald Language Institute). In August 1965, The Korean Republic was renamed The Korea Herald.

=== 1970-1999: Expansion ===
In 1973 The Korea Herald began issuing domestic daily newspaper with a special emphasis on business and economic news. In 1982, the daily international edition of The Korea Herald was launched as an 8-page tabloid. In 1995 The Korea Herald began providing internet services in 1995 and its domestic business section followed that suit in 1999. In addition Herald has been appointed the official English publisher for many notable events such as the Seoul Asian Games(1986), Daejun Expo(1992), General Assembly of Universal Postal(1994), Winter Universiade events(1997), Busan East Asian Games (1997). In December, 1999 a web based domestic daily newspaper was also launched.

=== 2000-2016: Ryan Jungwook Hong era ===
In December 2002, Hong Jung-wook acquired the Herald Corporation and currently sits as the chairman of the group. Since its acquisition, Herald has quickly expanded its businesses in other areas, namely the internet, broadcasting, magazines, education, and ecofriendly businesses. Starting in 2012, under the slogan “Within nature lies a cure for humanity”, Herald has invested heavily in procuring and solidifying various ecofriendly businesses. Established in 2012, Herald Ecochem was successful in developing Korea's first oxidizing biodegradable plastic film and is currently in the process of launching a variety of eco-friendly packaging materials. In 2013, Herald expanded into the organic and natural whole foods business by acquiring Cheonbo Natural Foods and launched its business as Organica. In 2015, Organica spun off its cleanse juice division, together with salads & soups, and is currently operating under the name Organica Day Inc.

Herald has also been actively involved in philanthropic endeavors, as exemplified by its strong commitment towards nature and humanity. In 2015 Herald became the first media company to receive a Family Friendly Certification from the Gender Equality organization. In addition Herald is the first Korean media company to establish a partnership with World Wide Fund for Nature (WWF). Herald has also showed its strong support in the arts and humanitarian causes, as evidenced by the establishment of Olje Foundation and Herald Philharmonic Orchestra .

== Media ==
=== The Korea Herald ===
The Korea Herald is a daily English-language newspaper founded in 1953 and published in Seoul, South Korea. In 1958, The Korean Republic published its fifth anniversary issue of 84 pages, the largest ever in Korea. In 1962, The Korean Republic published its first daily educational supplement and launched the Korean Republic English Institute (the Korea Herald Language Institute). The Korea Herald is considered the nation's top English-language newspaper as it occupies over 50% of Korea's English newspaper sector and is Korea's only member company of the Asia News Network (ANN). The Korea Herald is currently being distributed in over 80 countries around globe and over 1 million readers visit the online edition of the paper on a daily basis. The editorial staff is composed of Korean and international writers and editors, with additional news coverage drawn from international news agencies such as the Associated Press.

=== The Herald Business ===
The Herald Business is the first daily economic newspaper ever established in Korean history. In 1952, the newspaper Jeil Shinbo was established, and in 1954, it was renamed to Industrial Economy Newspaper. In 1973, it was acquired by the Korea International Trade Association and became The Daily Naewoe Economic Newspaper. In 1973, The Korea Herald launched The Daily Naewoe Economic Newspaper which was later renamed Herald Business in 2003. The Herald Business is one of the nation's leading business news sources. The newspaper's primary focus is on administration and business, but also includes content on culture and entertainment as well. It is Korea's representative evening paper known for its unconventional editorials and stimulating subject matter. The online edition of the paper was established in 1999 and has shown exponential growth since as it currently boasts an average 15 million page views per day. Herald Business has successful transition from a hard copy newspaper to an online and mobile ‘visual content newspaper’ and have launched several sections with an in-depth analysis of the subject matter. These section includes Super Rich, a section focusing on the 0.01%, Real Food, a food magazine with a primary focus on vegan diet, Herald Pop, a focus on the entertainment industry, and HOOC, an innovative SNS media content.

=== The Herald Business (USA) ===
In 2005, The Herald Business (USA) was established to provide news to Koreans living in the United States. It provides important news content from The Herald Business and local news. Good Morning Media (publisher of The Herald Business (USA)) not only publishes newspapers, but regularly contributes to the Korean community by holding various events, such as forums and recitals.

=== Herald Design ===
In 2011 the Herald Design Forum was created. This forum shares world-changing designs and creative inspirations from all around the globe and has been a key design event in Korea. Herald Design Forum drew public attention through the participation of internationally renowned designers like Chris Bangle and Karim Rashid.

=== Herald Muse ===
Another media produced by Herald Corporation is Herald Muse, an entertainment platform focused on K-content.

== Education ==
=== Herald Edu ===
Herald edu was founded in 2004 and the company is responsible for managing Herald's six English villages. The English Villages are located in Seoul (Pungnap, Gwanak), Busan, Mokpo, Geoje, and Pyeongtaek. The English Villages' aim is to teach English in a fun and engaging manner. Herald Edu also operates a school of continuing education for foreign languages for both children and adults.

=== The Junior Herald ===
The Junior Herald is a high-quality English newspaper for children created by leading international writers who have written for distinguished news agencies such as The Korea Herald, Reuters, and The Associated Press. It was founded in 2004 and is geared toward adolescents (ages 10~13). The Junior Herald is also focused on idea exchanges with other English newspapers for children published around the world.

=== Herald Academy ===
A children's English academy franchise that also produces English teaching materials. Herald Academy is an education company that is composed of Herald School (English academy franchise for children), Herald NIE (English franchise for children focusing on English Newspapers in Education (NIE)), Herald English (English preschool), and KNEAT (National English Ability Test (NEAT) business), while also publishing English textbooks for schools.

=== Digital Herald ===
Digital Herald is an education service company that specializes in English education and translation. Digital Herald runs the 60-year-old Korea Herald Language Institute and operates an online Herald Campus that offers English education through Korea Herald news. The company also offers ESCORT, a commissioned English education service for companies, and HSPI, an evaluation service for job applicants that focuses on one-to-one English speaking for interviews. Korea Herald Translation Center, a subsidiary of Digital Herald, provides a high-quality translation service.

== Lifestyle ==
=== Organica ===
Organica is a premium whole food designer that offers eco-friendly, healthy, and natural food. In 2013, Herald acquired Cheonbo Natural Foods, previously Korea's largest environmentally friendly grain company, and launched its business as Organica. Organica supplies foods that retain the flavor and nutrition of its natural ingredients without additives. The company a variety of natural snacks such as Natural Roasted Sweet Potato, Natural Dried Persimmon, Honest Bars, Organic Honey Butter Almonds, and superfoods such as quinoa, lentils, garbanzo beans, amaranth, chia seed, flaxseed, hemp seed, and basil seed.

=== Organica Day ===
In 2015, Organica Day spun off of Organica as a division that produces cleanse juices, salads and cleanse soups. The same year, Paju Juice Production center was completed. In addition Organica Day has produced Korea's first cold-pressed cleanse juice, Just Juice Cleanse. The company utilizes high-pressure processing (HPP) that allows the juices to be sterilized and preserved without compensating their flavors and nutrients. Organica Day has also produced Korea's first detox soup, Cleanse Soup.

=== Herald Echochem ===
Herald Ecochem, established in May 2012, is an environmentally conscious company that manufactures plastic materials for food, electronics, and other products. In 2013 Ecochem received ISO 9001, a quality management certificate, and in 2014 it received ISO 14001, an environmental management certificate. In addition in 2015, Ecochem became the first Korean company to receive a “Green Label’, which is Singapore's ecofriendly approval certificate. Ecochem is currently in the process of developing other high value films such as contractile film, special protection film, sun ray protecting film, and circuit board film.

=== Herald Artday ===
Herald Artday is cultural media company that specializes in art auctions, exhibitions, and conventions. It was founded in 2010 and has become Korea's leading online art auction within a year. Herald Artday Mobile Art Exhibit Guide has been downloaded over 500,000 times. Herald Artday has followed the initiative to bring art to the public through hosting fair online auctions and providing credible mobile content.

== Other affiliates ==
=== Olje Foundation ===
A non-profit organization promoting classics publication and education by offering Olje Classics and Olje Selections - a carefully curated series of Western and Eastern literature, philosophy, religion, and history books - to the public at low costs and donating 20% of the books to schools, libraries, armed forces, prisons, etc.

=== Herald Philharmonic Orchestra ===
Herald Philharmonic Orchestra was founded in 2014 in an effort to popularize classical music. Its primary objective is to expose classical music to the youth and other ordinary citizens. Its principal conductor has conducted at the Hungary International Competition and has received the Republic of Korea Opera Conductor Award.
