= Lee Choon-hee =

South Korean politician (born 1955)

- 이춘희
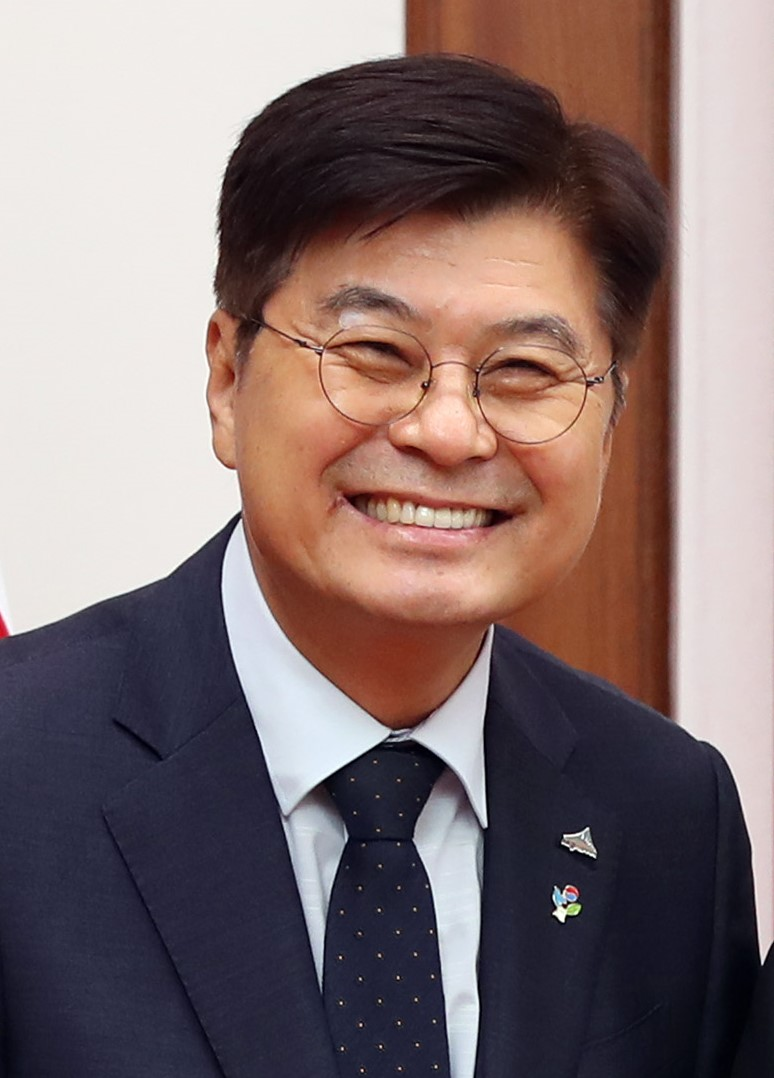

Mayor of Sejong City
- In office 1 July 2014 – 30 June 2022
- Preceded by: Yoo Han-shik
- Succeeded by: Choi Min-ho

Personal details
- Born: 6 December 1955 (age 70) Gochang, North Jeolla Province, South Korea
- Party: Democratic
- Education: Hanyang University; Korea University; Seoul National University
- Religion: Roman Catholic (Christian name : Francis Xavier)

Lee Choon-hee (Korean: 이춘희; born 6 December 1955) is a South Korean politician who served as the mayor of Sejong City from 2014 to 2022. Previously, during the presidency of Roh Moo-Hyun, he was Vice Minister of the Ministry of Land, Infrastructure and Transport. He later moved on to become the first administrator of the National Agency for Administrative City Construction that oversaw the planning and construction of Sejong City. In his second attempt, he won the election and became Mayor of Sejong City in 2014. He won the 2018 Mayoral election with 71.3% of the votes to serve his second term as Mayor of Sejong City. Back in 1986-87 when he was with the Ministry of Construction, he attended a one-year non-degree Special Program in Urban Studies (SPURS) at the Department of Urban Studies and Planning (DUSP), Massachusetts Institute of Technology (MIT).

== Election results ==
=== Local elections ===
==== Mayor of Sejong ====
Year	Elections	Constituency	Political party	Votes (%)	Remarks
2012	2012 By-election	Sejong (Mayoral Elections)	DUP	17,349 (37.34%)	Defeated
2014	6th Iocal Election	Sejong (Mayoral Elections)	NPAD	36,203 (57.78%)	Won
2018	7th Iocal Election	Sejong (Mayoral Elections)	Democratic	96,896 (71.30%)	Won
2022	8th Iocal Election	Sejong (Mayoral Elections)	Democratic	69,995 (47.16%)	Defeated
