= Software entrepreneurship =

Software entrepreneurship has a different set of developing strategies than other business start-ups. The development of software, a digital "soft" good, involves different business models, product strategy, people management, and development plan compared to the traditional manufacturing and service industries. For example in the software business, making one or ten million copies of a product cost about the same. Furthermore, the productivity difference between a good and bad employee is ten to twentyfold. As well, software projects tolerate 80 percent lateness and ongoing design changes on a regular basis.

Software entrepreneurship involves a broad range of businesses; from helping people plan daily events to controlling a space shuttle. There are mainly three kinds of software businesses: products, services and content business such as Wikipedia.

== Products Versus Services ==
The first thing software entrepreneurs should understand is the difference and the interrelationship between products and services business. The software product business is about selling licensed packages to customers. These products help solve a user pain and have potential for growth and profits. One advantage of starting up in this direction is the ability to attract stock market investors and venture capitalists for funding. The downside of creating products is that software sales are subject to fluctuations. Sales will drop drastically in economic recessions.

The service business involves creating applications for clients that tailor to their business needs. This includes the maintenance of software products they have purchased before. One advantage of service business is that long-term customer contracts can allow the company to survive rough economic times. The downside is that the business needs to attract enough clients to keep developers and consultants busy.

Software companies can also develop a hybrid solution involving a mixture of products and services. In this case, solutions are sold to clients that require extensive customization. Approximately 20 to 50 percent of coding is required for each individual client. Customers purchasing this type of IT solution usually do not switch vendors for long periods of time.

== Funding ==
Funding is typically done by corporate professionals who are at a high managerial level, the primary motive for such fundraising is of course, profit.

== Bank Financing ==
This is practically an impossible method as the bank requires security and personal loan guarantees.

=== Government Aid ===
Governments usually give out non-repayable grants to encourage start-ups. There are also investment tax credits that can be claimed. One thing to be careful about government aid is the lengthy procedures that may be required before obtaining the funds.

=== Venture Capital ===
Venture capital is risk capital invested into a start-up company at its early stages. Venture capitalists usually invest in start-ups that already have a relatively developed software product and some early sales. They look for products that have a large potential in a growing market with a competitive edge.

Venture capital help offers a large sum of money and often assistance in managing the company. People with software start-up experiences are available for mentoring. There are also help available in assisting the process of going public.

== See also ==
- Entrepreneurship
- Entrepreneurs
