= Kwon Young-jin (politician) =

South Korean politician

- 권영진
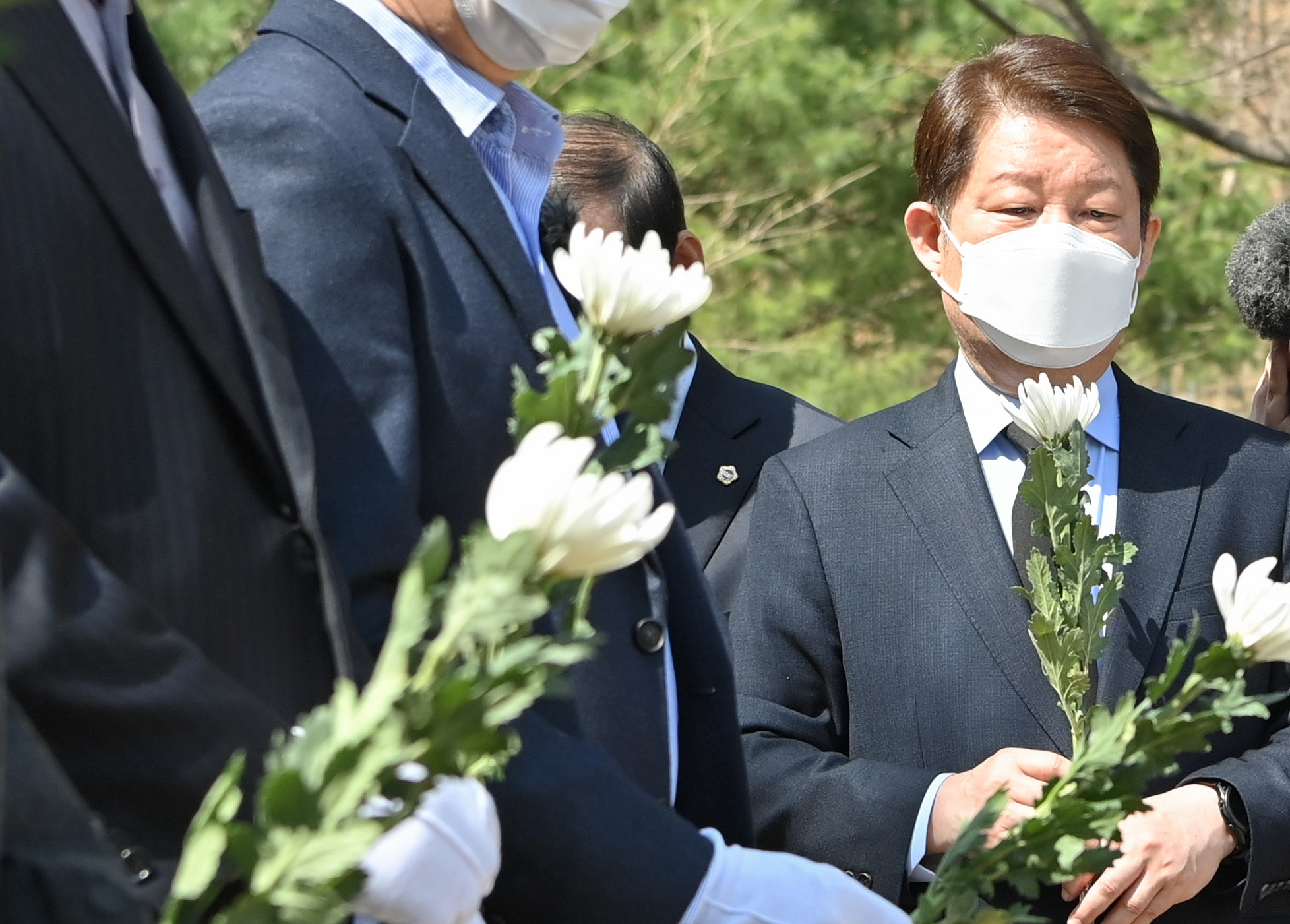

Mayor of Daegu
- In office 1 July 2014 – 30 June 2022
- Preceded by: Kim Bum-il
- Succeeded by: Hong Joon-pyo

Member of the National Assembly
- In office 30 May 2008 – 29 May 2012
- Preceded by: Woo Won-shik
- Succeeded by: Woo Won-shik
- Constituency: Nowon B (Seoul)

Member of the National Assembly
- Incumbent
- Assumed office 30 May 2024
- Preceded by: Kim Yong-pan
- Constituency: Dalseo C (Daegu)

Personal details
- Born: 10 December 1962 (age 63) Andong, South Korea
- Party: People Power Party
- Education: Korea University
- Website: Kwon Young-jin's Blog

Korean name
- Hangul: 권영진
- Hanja: 權泳臻
- RR: Gwon Yeongjin
- MR: Kwŏn Yŏngjin

Kwon Young-jin (Korean: 권영진; born 10 December 1962) is a South Korean politician who served as the mayor of Daegu from 2014 to 2022.

== Life ==
Kwon Young-jin was born on December 10, 1962, in Andong, North Gyeongsang Province.

In 2002, Kwon entered politics on the recommendation of the President of the Grand National Party Lee Hoi-chang. In 2004, he led the way "Tent headquarters movement" of the Grand National Party.

In 2007 presidential election, Kwon supported Lee Myung-bak. And he ran for the 2008 legislative election for Nowon District, Seoul and he won over the Woo Won-shik of the United Democratic Party. However, he lost to Woo Won-shik in the 2012 legislative election.

Kwon ran for mayor of Daegu in the 2014 local elections and won. And in 2018, he was re-elected despite his party (Liberty Korea Party)'s poor approval rating. He put up the city government's slogan is "Only Citizens' Happiness, Creating Daegu."

In 2021, Kwon gained international attention during the COVID-19 pandemic when he propagated a fraudulent COVID-19 vaccine proposal to South Korean news media. Mayor Kwon announced to reporters in May 2021 that his city, via a public-private partnership focused on unifying medical care throughout Daegu, was in talks with a foreign trading company to obtain 30 million doses of the Pfizer COVID-19 vaccine independently from the central government (headed by Moon Jae-in's opposition party). Following this media event, Kwon's office sent South Korea's Ministry of Health and Welfare import proposal drafts between the public-private partnership, Medi-City Daegu Council, and the foreign trading company. It raised concerns about the deal, citing "reliability issues" due to Pfizer only supplying its vaccines through central governments and international health organizations, not through unaffiliated intermediaries. Kwon has since apologized for giving credence to the fraudulent vaccine distribution scam.

== Election results ==
=== General elections ===
Year	Elections	Constituency	Political party	Votes (%)	Results
2004	17th National Assembly General Election	Nowon B (Seoul)	GNP	42,677 (39.61%)	Defeated (2nd)
2008	18th National Assembly General Election	Nowon B (Seoul)	GNP	43,150 (49.93%)	Won
2012	19th National Assembly General Election	Nowon B (Seoul)	Saenuri	49,026 (47.94%)	Defeated (2nd)
2024	22nd National Assembly General Election	Dalseo C (Daegu)	PPP	49,816 (67.08%)	Won

=== Local elections ===
==== Mayor of Daegu ====
Year	Elections	Constituency	Political party	Votes (%)	Remarks
2014	6th Iocal Election	Daegu (Mayoral Elections)	Saenuri	581,175 (55.95%)	Won
2018	7th Iocal Election	Daegu (Mayoral Elections)	LKP	619,165 (53.73%)	Won
