= 2018 South Korean local elections =

Korean local elections on 13 June 2018

- 13 June 2018

17 regional heads 824 regional councilors 226 municipal mayors 2,926 municipal councilors
- Registered: 42,907,715
- Turnout: 25,832,076; 60.2% (▲3.4pp)
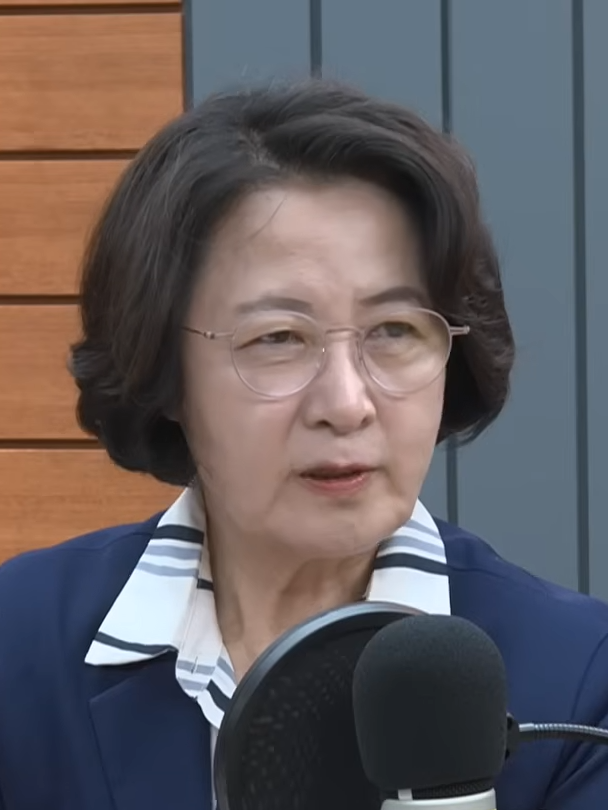

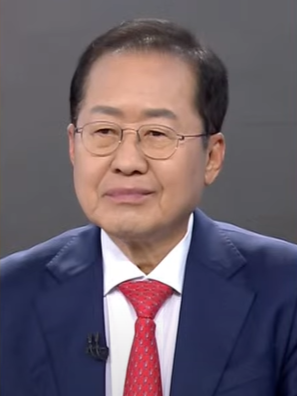
	First party	Second party
Leader	Choo Mi-ae	Hong Joon-pyo
Party	Democratic	Liberty Korea
Regional seats last election	9 heads 349 councilors	8 heads 416 councilors
Municipal seats last election	80 mayors 1,157 councilors	117 mayors 1,413 councilors
Regional seats won	14 heads 652 councilors	2 heads 137 councilors
Regional seat change	▲5 heads ▲303 councilors	▼6 heads ▼279 councilors
Municipal seats won	151 mayors 1,638 councilors	53 mayors 1,009 councilors
Municipal seat change	▲71 mayors ▲481 councilors	▼64 mayors ▼404 councilors

Results summary of gubernatorial (top left), municipal mayoral (top right), metropolitan and provincial councilors (bottom left), and municipal councilors (bottom right)

The 7th local elections were held in South Korea on 13 June 2018. The election coincided with the by-elections for the vacant seats in the National Assembly. The election was a landslide victory for the Democratic Party of Korea, the ruling party, after two successful summits with the third inter-Korean summit on 27 April and the first North Korea-United States summit in Singapore on 12 June.

== Regional head elections ==
Distribution of elected metropolitan mayors and governors by political party: Democratic Liberty Korea Independent

A total of 17 metropolitan mayors and governors were elected.

Party	Votes	%	Seats	+/–
Democratic Party	14,191,438	56.01	14	+5
Liberty Korea Party	7,884,768	31.12	2	–6
Bareunmirae Party	1,912,643	7.55	0	New
Justice Party	502,752	1.98	0	0
Party for Democracy and Peace	295,701	1.17	0	New
Minjung Party	199,402	0.79	0	New
Green Party Korea	95,062	0.38	0	New
Korea	23,012	0.09	0	New
Our Future	11,599	0.05	0	New
Korean Patriots' Party	11,222	0.04	0	New
Chinbak Yeondae	4,021	0.02	0	New
Independents	204,975	0.81	1	+1
Total	25,336,595	100.00	17	0
Valid votes	25,336,595	98.08		
Invalid/blank votes	495,481	1.92		
Total votes	25,832,076	100.00		
Registered voters/turnout	42,907,715	60.20		
Source: National Election Commission

=== Summary ===
Province/City	Head	Incumbent	Party	Elected	Party
Seoul	Mayor	Park Won-soon	Democratic	Park Won-soon	Democratic
Busan	Mayor	Suh Byung-soo	Liberty Korea	Oh Keo-don	Democratic
Daegu	Mayor	Kwon Young-jin	Liberty Korea	Kwon Young-jin	Liberty Korea
Incheon	Mayor	Yoo Jeong-bok	Liberty Korea	Park Nam-choon	Democratic
Gwangju	Mayor	Yoon Jang-hyun	Democratic	Lee Yong-seop	Democratic
Daejeon	Mayor	Lee Jae-gwan (acting)	Independent	Heo Tae-jeong	Democratic
Ulsan	Mayor	Kim Gi-hyeon	Liberty Korea	Song Cheol-ho	Democratic
Sejong	Mayor	Lee Choon-hee	Democratic	Lee Choon-hee	Democratic
Gyeonggi	Governor	Nam Kyung-pil	Liberty Korea	Lee Jae Myung	Democratic
Gangwon	Governor	Choi Moon-soon	Democratic	Choi Moon-soon	Democratic
North Chungcheong	Governor	Lee Si-jong	Democratic	Lee Si-jong	Democratic
South Chungcheong	Governor	Namkoong Young (acting)	Independent	Yang Seung-jo	Democratic
North Jeolla	Governor	Song Ha-jin	Democratic	Song Ha-jin	Democratic
South Jeolla	Governor	Lee Jae-young (acting)	Independent	Kim Yung-rok	Democratic
North Gyeongsang	Governor	Kim Kwan-yong	Liberty Korea	Lee Cheol-woo	Liberty Korea
South Gyeongsang	Governor	Han Kyung-ho (acting)	Independent	Kim Kyoung-soo	Democratic
Jeju	Governor	Won Hee-ryong	Independent	Won Hee-ryong	Independent

=== Seoul ===
Candidate	Party	Votes	%
Park Won-soon (incumbent)	Democratic Party	2,619,497	52.79
Kim Moon-soo	Liberty Korea Party	1,158,487	23.35
Ahn Cheol-soo	Bareunmirae Party	970,374	19.56
Shin Ji-ye	Green Party Korea	82,874	1.67
Kim Jong-min	Justice Party	81,664	1.65
Kim Jin-sook	Minjung Party	22,134	0.45
Woo In-cheol	Our Future	11,599	0.23
Ihn Ji-yeon	Korean Patriots' Party	11,222	0.23
Choi Tae-hyeon	Chinbak Yeondae	4,021	0.08
Total		4,961,872	100.00
Valid votes		4,961,872	98.86
Invalid/blank votes		57,226	1.14
Total votes		5,019,098	100.00
Registered voters/turnout		8,380,947	59.89
Democratic hold			
Source: National Election Commission

=== Busan ===
Candidate	Party	Votes	%
Oh Keo-don	Democratic Party	940,469	55.23
Suh Byung-soo (incumbent)	Liberty Korea Party	632,806	37.16
Lee Sung-guen	Bareunmirae Party	67,502	3.96
Park Joo-mi	Justice Party	35,299	2.07
Lee Jong-hyuk	Independent	26,720	1.57
Total		1,702,796	100.00
Valid votes		1,702,796	98.56
Invalid/blank votes		24,888	1.44
Total votes		1,727,684	100.00
Registered voters/turnout		2,939,046	58.78
Democratic gain from Liberty Korea			
Source: National Election Commission

=== Daegu ===
Candidate	Party	Votes	%
Kwon Young-jin (incumbent)	Liberty Korea Party	619,165	53.74
Lim Dae-yun	Democratic Party	458,112	39.76
Kim Hyung-gi	Bareunmirae Party	74,955	6.51
Total		1,152,232	100.00
Valid votes		1,152,232	98.29
Invalid/blank votes		20,047	1.71
Total votes		1,172,279	100.00
Registered voters/turnout		2,047,286	57.26
Liberty Korea hold			
Source: National Election Commission

=== Incheon ===
Candidate	Party	Votes	%
Park Nam-chun	Democratic Party	766,186	57.67
Yoo Jeong-bok (incumbent)	Liberty Korea Party	470,937	35.44
Moon Byung-ho	Bareunmirae Party	54,054	4.07
Kim Eung-ho	Justice Party	37,472	2.82
Total		1,328,649	100.00
Valid votes		1,328,649	98.49
Invalid/blank votes		20,435	1.51
Total votes		1,349,084	100.00
Registered voters/turnout		2,440,779	55.27
Democratic gain from Liberty Korea			
Source: National Election Commission

=== Gwangju ===
Candidate	Party	Votes	%
Lee Yong-seop	Democratic Party	573,995	84.08
Na Gyung-che	Justice Party	40,916	5.99
Jeon Duk-young	Bareunmirae Party	34,487	5.05
Yoon Min-ho	Minjung Party	33,312	4.88
Total		682,710	100.00
Valid votes		682,710	98.34
Invalid/blank votes		11,542	1.66
Total votes		694,252	100.00
Registered voters/turnout		1,172,429	59.21
Democratic hold			
Source: National Election Commission

=== Daejeon ===
Candidate	Party	Votes	%
Heo Tae-jeong	Democratic Party	393,354	56.41
Park Sung-hyo	Liberty Korea Party	224,306	32.17
Nam Choung-hee	Bareunmirae Party	61,271	8.79
Kim Yoon-gi	Justice Party	18,351	2.63
Total		697,282	100.00
Valid votes		697,282	98.63
Invalid/blank votes		9,701	1.37
Total votes		706,983	100.00
Registered voters/turnout		1,219,513	57.97
Democratic gain			
Source: National Election Commission

=== Ulsan ===
Candidate	Party	Votes	%
Song Cheol-ho	Democratic Party	317,341	52.89
Kim Gi-hyeon (incumbent)	Liberty Korea Party	240,475	40.08
Kim Chang-hyun	Minjung Party	28,621	4.77
Lee Young-hee	Bareunmirae Party	13,589	2.26
Total		600,026	100.00
Valid votes		600,026	98.25
Invalid/blank votes		10,672	1.75
Total votes		610,698	100.00
Registered voters/turnout		942,550	64.79
Democratic gain from Liberty Korea			
Source: National Election Commission

=== Sejong ===
Candidate	Party	Votes	%
Lee Choon-hee (incumbent)	Democratic Party	96,896	71.31
Song Ah-young	Liberty Korea Party	24,546	18.06
Heo Chul-hue	Bareunmirae Party	14,444	10.63
Total		135,886	100.00
Valid votes		135,886	98.75
Invalid/blank votes		1,717	1.25
Total votes		137,603	100.00
Registered voters/turnout		222,852	61.75
Democratic hold			
Source: National Election Commission

=== Gyeonggi ===
Candidate	Party	Votes	%
Lee Jae-myung	Democratic Party	3,370,621	56.41
Nam Kyung-pil (incumbent)	Liberty Korea Party	2,122,433	35.52
Kim Young-hwan	Bareunmirae Party	287,504	4.81
Lee Hong-woo	Justice Party	151,871	2.54
Hong Sung-kyu	Minjung Party	43,098	0.72
Total		5,975,527	100.00
Valid votes		5,975,527	98.20
Invalid/blank votes		109,428	1.80
Total votes		6,084,955	100.00
Registered voters/turnout		10,533,027	57.77
Democratic gain from Liberty Korea			
Source: National Election Commission

=== Gangwon ===
Candidate	Party	Votes	%
Choi Moon-soon (incumbent)	Democratic Party	518,447	64.73
Jeong Chang-soo	Liberty Korea Party	282,456	35.27
Total		800,903	100.00
Valid votes		800,903	97.77
Invalid/blank votes		18,290	2.23
Total votes		819,193	100.00
Registered voters/turnout		1,296,196	63.20
Democratic hold			
Source: National Election Commission

=== North Chungcheong ===
Candidate	Party	Votes	%
Lee Si-jong (incumbent)	Democratic Party	468,750	61.16
Park Kyung-guk	Liberty Korea Party	227,371	29.67
Shin Yong-han	Bareunmirae Party	70,330	9.18
Total		766,451	100.00
Valid votes		766,451	97.97
Invalid/blank votes		15,865	2.03
Total votes		782,316	100.00
Registered voters/turnout		1,318,186	59.35
Democratic hold			
Source: National Election Commission

=== South Chungcheong ===
Candidate	Party	Votes	%
Yang Seung-jo	Democratic Party	615,870	62.56
Lee In-je	Liberty Korea Party	345,577	35.10
Cha Gook-hwan	Korea	23,012	2.34
Total		984,459	100.00
Valid votes		984,459	97.33
Invalid/blank votes		26,988	2.67
Total votes		1,011,447	100.00
Registered voters/turnout		1,740,413	58.12
Democratic gain			
Source: National Election Commission

=== North Jeolla ===
Candidate	Party	Votes	%
Song Ha-jin (incumbent)	Democratic Party	682,042	70.57
Lim Chung-yeop	Party for Democracy and Peace	184,728	19.11
Kwon Tae-hong	Justice Party	52,496	5.43
Shin Jae-bong	Liberty Korea Party	26,374	2.73
Lee Kwang-seok	Minjung Party	20,827	2.15
Total		966,467	100.00
Valid votes		966,467	96.99
Invalid/blank votes		30,037	3.01
Total votes		996,504	100.00
Registered voters/turnout		1,527,729	65.23
Democratic hold			
Source: National Election Commission

=== South Jeolla ===
Candidate	Party	Votes	%
Kim Yung-rok	Democratic Party	807,902	77.09
Min Young-sam	Party for Democracy and Peace	110,973	10.59
Lee Sung-soo	Minjung Party	51,410	4.91
Park Mae-ho	Bareunmirae Party	40,287	3.84
Noh Hyung-tae	Justice Party	37,433	3.57
Total		1,048,005	100.00
Valid votes		1,048,005	95.96
Invalid/blank votes		44,102	4.04
Total votes		1,092,107	100.00
Registered voters/turnout		1,577,224	69.24
Democratic gain			
Source: National Election Commission

=== North Gyeongsang ===
Candidate	Party	Votes	%
Lee Cheol-woo	Liberty Korea Party	732,785	52.12
Oh Joong-gi	Democratic Party	482,564	34.32
Kwon Oe-eul	Bareunmirae Party	143,409	10.20
Park Chang-ho	Justice Party	47,250	3.36
Total		1,406,008	100.00
Valid votes		1,406,008	96.46
Invalid/blank votes		51,531	3.54
Total votes		1,457,539	100.00
Registered voters/turnout		2,251,538	64.74
Liberty Korea hold			
Source: National Election Commission

=== South Gyeongsang ===
Candidate	Party	Votes	%
Kim Kyoung-soo	Democratic Party	941,491	52.81
Kim Tae-ho	Liberty Korea Party	765,809	42.96
Kim Yoo-geun	Bareunmirae Party	75,418	4.23
Total		1,782,718	100.00
Valid votes		1,782,718	97.98
Invalid/blank votes		36,673	2.02
Total votes		1,819,391	100.00
Registered voters/turnout		2,765,485	65.79
Democratic gain			
Source: National Election Commission

=== Jeju ===
Candidate	Party	Votes	%
Won Hee-ryong (incumbent)	Independent	178,255	51.73
Moon Dae-rim	Democratic Party	137,901	40.02
Ko Eun-young	Green Party Korea	12,188	3.54
Kim Bang-hoon	Liberty Korea Party	11,241	3.26
Jang Seong-cheol	Bareunmirae Party	5,019	1.46
Total		344,604	100.00
Valid votes		344,604	98.19
Invalid/blank votes		6,339	1.81
Total votes		350,943	100.00
Registered voters/turnout		532,515	65.90
Independent hold			
Source: National Election Commission

== Regional council elections ==
Distribution of the major party of the metropolitan and provincial councils: Democratic Liberty Korea

A total of 824 regional councilors were elected.

Party	Proportional			Constituency			Total seats	+/–
Party	Votes	%	Seats	Votes	%	Seats	Total seats	+/–
Democratic Party	12,996,592	51.42	47	14,071,432	57.47	605	652	+303
Liberty Korea Party	7,017,554	27.76	24	7,640,074	31.20	113	137	–279
Justice Party	2,267,690	8.97	10	107,937	0.44	1	11	+11
Bareunmirae Party	1,973,141	7.81	4	1,034,387	4.22	1	5	New
Party for Democracy and Peace	385,202	1.52	2	466,185	1.90	1	3	New
Minjung Party	245,437	0.97	0	180,082	0.74	0	0	New
Green Party Korea	175,988	0.70	0				0	0
Korean Patriots' Party	97,828	0.39	0	8,632	0.04	0	0	New
Labor Party	60,913	0.24	0	18,255	0.07	0	0	–1
Our Future	27,444	0.11	0				0	New
Chinbak Yeondae	18,840	0.07	0				0	New
Saenuri Party	7,978	0.03	0				0	New
International Green Party	2,559	0.01	0	437	0.00	0	0	0
Korean National Party				612	0.00	0	0	New
Hongik Party				467	0.00	0	0	New
Independents				957,801	3.91	16	16	–4
Total	25,277,166	100.00	87	24,486,301	100.00	737	824	+35
Valid votes	25,277,166	97.88		24,486,301	97.08			
Invalid/blank votes	548,235	2.12		735,459	2.92			
Total votes	25,825,401	100.00		25,221,760	100.00			
Registered voters/turnout	42,907,715	60.19		41,939,321	60.14			
Source: National Election Commission

=== Results by province or city ===
Province/City	Seats	DPK	LKP	JP	BMP	PDP	IND
Seoul	110	102	6	1	1		
Busan	47	41	6				
Daegu	30	5	25				
Incheon	37	34	2	1			
Gwangju	23	22		1			
Daejeon	22	21	1				
Ulsan	22	17	5				
Sejong	18	17	1				
Gyeonggi	142	135	4	2	1		
Gangwon	46	35	11				
North Chungcheong	32	28	4				
South Chungcheong	42	33	8	1			
North Jeolla	39	36		1		1	1
South Jeolla	58	54		2		2	
North Gyeongsang	60	9	41		1		9
South Gyeongsang	58	34	21	1			2
Jeju	38	29	2	1	2		4
Total	824	652	137	11	5	3	16
Source: National Election Commission

=== Constituency seats ===
Province/City	Seats	DPK	LKP	BMP	PDP	JP	IND
Seoul	100	97	3				
Busan	42	38	4				
Daegu	27	4	23				
Incheon	33	32	1				
Gwangju	20	20					
Daejeon	19	19					
Ulsan	19	15	4				
Sejong	16	16					
Gyeonggi	129	128	1				
Gangwon	41	32	9				
North Chungcheong	29	26	3				
South Chungcheong	38	31	7				
North Jeolla	35	34					1
South Jeolla	52	50			1	1	
North Gyeongsang	54	7	38				9
South Gyeongsang	52	31	19				2
Jeju	31	25	1	1			4
Total	737	605	113	1	1	1	16
Source: National Election Commission

=== Proportional representation seats ===
Province/City	Seats	DPK	LKP	JP	BMP	PDP
Seoul	10	5	3	1	1	
Busan	5	3	2			
Daegu	3	1	2			
Incheon	4	2	1	1		
Gwangju	3	2		1		
Daejeon	3	2	1			
Ulsan	3	2	1			
Sejong	2	1	1			
Gyeonggi	13	7	3	2	1	
Gangwon	5	3	2			
North Chungcheong	3	2	1			
South Chungcheong	4	2	1	1		
North Jeolla	4	2		1		1
South Jeolla	6	4		1		1
North Gyeongsang	6	2	3		1	
South Gyeongsang	6	3	2	1		
Jeju	7	4	1	1	1	
Total	87	47	24	10	4	2
Source: National Election Commission

== Municipal mayoral elections ==
Distribution of elected municipal mayors by political party: Democratic Liberty Korea Democracy and Peace Independent

A total of 226 municipal mayors (municipal city, county, autonomous district) were elected.

Party	Votes	%	Seats	+/–
Democratic Party	13,453,673	54.14	151	+71
Liberty Korea Party	7,566,555	30.45	53	–64
Bareunmirae Party	1,302,798	5.24	0	New
Party for Democracy and Peace	653,324	2.63	5	New
Justice Party	218,590	0.88	0	0
Minjung Party	73,322	0.30	0	New
Korean Patriots' Party	17,940	0.07	0	New
Green Party Korea	4,431	0.02	0	0
Korean National Party	936	0.00	0	New
Future Korean Peninsula Union	745	0.00	0	New
Independents	1,557,021	6.27	17	–12
Total	24,849,335	100.00	226	0
Valid votes	24,849,335	98.05		
Invalid/blank votes	494,130	1.95		
Total votes	25,343,465	100.00		
Registered voters/turnout	42,152,348	60.12		
Source: National Election Commission

=== Results by province or city ===
Province/City	Mayors	DPK	LKP	PDP	IND
Seoul	25	24	1		
Busan	16	13	2		1
Daegu	8		7		1
Incheon	10	9	1		
Gwangju	5	5			
Daejeon	5	5			
Ulsan	5	5			
Gyeonggi	31	29	2		
Gangwon	18	11	5		2
North Chungcheong	11	7	4		
South Chungcheong	15	11	4		
North Jeolla	14	10		2	2
South Jeolla	22	14		3	5
North Gyeongsang	23	1	17		5
South Gyeongsang	18	7	10		1
Total	226	151	53	5	17
Source: National Election Commission

== Municipal council elections ==
Distribution of the major party of the municipal councils: Democratic Liberty Korea Independents majority No major party

A total of 2,926 municipal councilors were elected.

Party	Proportional			Constituency			Total seats	+/–
Party	Votes	%	Seats	Votes	%	Seats	Total seats	+/–
Democratic Party	13,465,648	57.45	238	12,918,190	53.52	1,400	1,638	+481
Liberty Korea Party	6,815,604	29.08	133	6,729,645	27.88	876	1,009	–404
Bareunmirae Party	1,687,604	7.20	2	1,606,605	6.66	19	21	New
Justice Party	922,066	3.93	9	467,302	1.94	17	26	+15
Party for Democracy and Peace	340,176	1.45	3	406,433	1.68	46	49	New
Minjung Party	165,429	0.71	0	305,278	1.26	11	11	New
Korean Patriots' Party	34,921	0.15	0	13,832	0.06	0	0	New
Green Party Korea	4,567	0.02	0	24,156	0.10	0	0	0
Korean National Party	1,605	0.01	0	164	0.00	0	0	New
Labor Party				23,524	0.10	0	0	–6
Our Future				9,706	0.04	0	0	New
Saenuri Party				278	0.00	0	0	New
Korea Party				223	0.00	0	0	New
Independents				1,630,647	6.76	172	172	–105
Total	23,437,620	100.00	385	24,135,983	100.00	2,541	2,926	+28
Valid votes	23,437,620	96.84		24,135,983	96.23			
Invalid/blank votes	765,140	3.16		946,006	3.77			
Total votes	24,202,760	100.00		25,081,989	100.00			
Registered voters/turnout	40,410,606	59.89		41,726,123	60.11			
Source: National Election Commission

=== Results by province or city ===
Province/City	Seats	DPK	LKP	PDP	JP	BMP	MP	IND
Seoul	423	249	157		5	9		3
Busan	182	103	78					1
Daegu	116	50	62		1	2		1
Incheon	118	71	46					1
Gwangju	68	55		9	1		3	
Daejeon	63	38	25					
Ulsan	50	27	21				1	1
Gyeonggi	446	289	144		5	4	2	2
Gangwon	169	93	63			1		12
North Chungcheong	132	86	43		1			2
South Chungcheong	171	98	66			1		6
North Jeolla	197	147		14	6	2		28
South Jeolla	243	178		26	3		4	32
North Gyeongsang	284	50	171		1	2		60
South Gyeongsang	264	104	133		3		1	23
Total	2,926	1,638	1,009	49	26	21	11	172
Source: National Election Commission

=== Constituency seats ===
Province/City	Seats	DPK	LKP	PDP	BMP	JP	MP	IND
Seoul	369	219	134		8	5		3
Busan	157	87	69					1
Daegu	102	45	53		2	1		1
Incheon	102	62	39					1
Gwangju	59	46		9		1	3	
Daejeon	54	33	21					
Ulsan	43	22	19				1	1
Gyeonggi	390	252	128		3	3	2	2
Gangwon	146	74	59		1			12
North Chungcheong	116	74	40					2
South Chungcheong	145	83	55		1			6
North Jeolla	172	126		14	2	2		28
South Jeolla	211	150		23		2	4	32
North Gyeongsang	247	38	146		2	1		60
South Gyeongsang	228	89	113			2	1	23
Total	2,541	1,400	876	46	19	17	11	172
Source: National Election Commission

=== Proportional representation seats ===
Province/City	Seats	DPK	LKP	JP	PDP	BMP
Seoul	54	30	23			1
Busan	25	16	9			
Daegu	14	5	9			
Incheon	16	9	7			
Gwangju	9	9				
Daejeon	9	5	4			
Ulsan	7	5	2			
Gyeonggi	56	37	16	2		1
Gangwon	23	19	4			
North Chungcheong	16	12	3	1		
South Chungcheong	26	15	11			
North Jeolla	25	21		4		
South Jeolla	32	28		1	3	
North Gyeongsang	37	12	25			
South Gyeongsang	36	15	20	1		
Total	385	238	133	9	3	2
Source: National Election Commission

== See also ==
- 2018 South Korean by-elections
