= Muryongsan (Ulsan) =

Mountain in Buk District and Dong District, Ulsan, South Korea

- Location within South Korea

Highest point
- Elevation: 452 m (1,483 ft)
- Coordinates: 35°35′35″N 129°24′00″E

Geography
- Location: Ulsan, South Korea

Korean name
- Hangul: 무룡산
- Hanja: 舞龍山
- RR: Muryongsan
- MR: Muryongsan

Muryongsan (Korean: 무룡산) is a mountain located in Buk District and Dong District, Ulsan, South Korea. It has an elevation of 452 m (1,483 ft).

== See also ==
- Geography of Korea
- List of South Korean tourist attractions
- List of mountains in Korea
- List of mountains by elevation
