= Baek Nam-chi =

South Korean academic and politician (1944–2022)

Member of the National Assembly of South Korea
- In office 30 May 1988 – 29 May 2000
- Preceded by: position established
- Succeeded by: Ham Seung-hui
- Constituency: Nowon-gu Gap

Personal details
- Born: 22 January 1944 Seocheon County, Chūseinan Province, Korea, Empire of Japan (now South Chungcheong Province, South Korea)
- Died: 4 May 2022 (aged 78)
- Party: Independent; Reunification Democratic Party; Democratic Liberal Party; New Korea Party; United Liberal Democrats
- Education: Seoul National University; New York University; Columbia University
- Occupation: Professor

Korean name
- Hangul: 백남치
- RR: Baek Namchi
- MR: Paek Namch'i

Baek Nam-chi (Korean: 백남치; 22 January 1944 – 4 May 2022) was a South Korean academic and politician. A member of the Reunification Democratic Party and the New Korea Party, he served in the National Assembly from 1988 to 2000. He died on 4 May 2022, at the age of 78.

== Election results ==
Year	Elections	Constituency	Political party	Votes (%)	Results
1978	10th National Assembly General Election	Buyeo-Seocheon-Boryeong (South Chungcheong)	Independent	9,536 (4.72%)	Defeated
1988	13th National Assembly General Election	Nowon A (Seoul)	RDP	25,699 (28.46%)	Won
1992	14th National Assembly General Election	Nowon A (Seoul)	DLP	42,487 (34.91%)	Won
1996	15th National Assembly General Election	Nowon A (Seoul)	NKP	43,859 (36.77%)	Won
2000	16th National Assembly General Election	Nowon A (Seoul)	ULD	11,491 (9.77%)	Defeated
