= Kim Sung-whan (environmental minister) =

South Korean politician

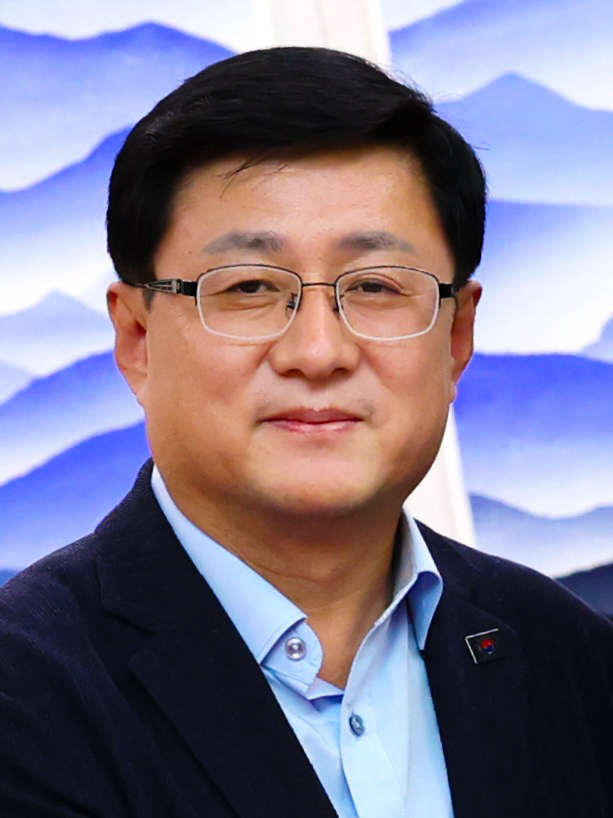
- Kim in 2025

Minister of Climate, Energy and Environment
- Incumbent
- Assumed office 22 July 2025
- President: Lee Jae Myung
- Prime Minister: Kim Min-seok; Han Seong-sook
- Preceded by: Kim Wan-seop

Member of the National Assembly
- Incumbent
- Assumed office 14 June 2018
- Preceded by: Ahn Cheol-soo
- Constituency: Nowon C (Seoul, 2018–2024); Nowon B (Seoul, 2024–)

Mayor of the Seoul Nowon
- In office 1 July 2010 – 12 February 2018
- Preceded by: Lee No-geun
- Succeeded by: Park Moon-gyu (acting); Oh Seung-rok

Personal details
- Born: October 15, 1965 (age 61) Yeosu South Jeolla, South Korea
- Party: Democratic
- Education: Yonsei University

Kim Sung-hwan is a South Korean politician. He is the Minister of the Environment and a member of the National Assembly. Kim was a member of the Nowon District Council and the district's mayor.

== Biography ==
Kim was born on October 15, 1965, in Yeosu. He graduated from Yonsei University with a degree in law and a master's degree in public administration. Kim took part in the June Democratic Struggle.

In 1992, Kim became a secretary to lawmaker Shin Gye-ryoon. From 1995 to 1998, Kim was in the Nowon District Council. From 1998 to 2002, he was a member of the Seoul Metropolitan Council. From August 2006 to September 2007, Kim was presidential secretary for policy coordination.

From 2010 to 2018, he was the mayor of the Nowon District. Kim was elected the National Assembly in June 2018, serving in the 20th, 21st, and 22nd National Assemblies. During his time in the National Assembly, Kim worked on several bills related to decarbonization.

In July 2025, Kim was appointed Minister of the Environment. On October 6, 2026, Kim claimed that South Korea would have more than 100 gigawatts of renewable energy capacity by 2030.

== Election results ==
=== General elections ===
Year	Elections	Constituency	Political party	Votes (%)	Results
2008	18th National Assembly General Election	Nowon C (Seoul)	UDP	13,036 (16.26%)	Defeated (3rd)
2018	2018 By-Election	Nowon C (Seoul)	Democratic (2015)	51,817 (56.43%)	Won
2020	21st National Assembly General Election	Nowon C (Seoul)	Democratic (2015)	55,556 (53.15%)	Won
2024	22nd National Assembly General Election	Nowon B (Seoul)	Democratic (2015)	85,721 (58.51%)	Won

=== Local elections ===
==== Mayor of Seoul Nowon ====
Year	Elections	Constituency	Political party	Votes (%)	Remarks
2010	5th Iocal Election	Mayor of Seoul Nowon	Democratic (2008)	139,714 (53.69%)	Won
2014	6th Iocal Election	Mayor of Seoul Nowon	NPAD	164,175 (58.93%)	Won

==== Seoul Metropolitan Council ====
Year	Elections	Constituency	Political party	Votes (%)	Remarks
1998	2nd Iocal Election	Seoul Nowon 4th	NCNP	25,975 (52.69%)	Won
2002	3rd Iocal Election	Seoul Nowon 4th	MDP	25,681 (47.39%)	Defeated (2nd)

==== Seoul Nowon Council ====
Year	Elections	Constituency	Political party	Votes (%)	Remarks
1995	1st Iocal Election	Seoul Nowon Sangggye 9-dong	Independent	7,325 (51.62%)	Won
