= Nowon A =

Constituency in Seoul, South Korea

- Single-member constituency for the National Assembly
- Location of the constituency
- District(s): Nowon District (part)
- Region: Seoul
- Electorate: 224,187 (2024)

Current constituency
- Created: 1988
- Seats: 1
- Party: Democratic Party
- Member: Woo Won-shik
- Created from: Dobong

Nowon A (Korean: 노원구 갑) is a constituency of the National Assembly of South Korea. The constituency consists of parts of Nowon District, Seoul. As of 2024, 224,187 eligible voters were registered in the constituency. The constituency was created in 1988 from the Dobong constituency.

== History ==
Throughout its history, Nowon A has displayed swing seat tendencies, having voted for both conservative and liberal political parties to represent the constituency in the National Assembly.

Baek Nam-chi of the centre-right Reunification Democratic Party was the first member to represent the constituency. Baek narrowly won re-election in 1992 and 1996, having received 34.91% and 36.77% of the vote respectively. Ahead of the 2000 election, the Grand National Party did not renominate incumbent Baek Nam-chi as the party's candidate for Nowon A, having nominated former Minister of Energy and Resources Choe Dong-kyu instead. In response to this, Baek left the Grand National Party and joined the right-wing United Liberal Democrats on February 23, 2000. Baek unsuccessfully ran for re-election under the United Liberal Democrats banner, coming in third place. He was succeeded by Ham Seung-hee of the liberal Millennium Democratic Party. Ham was defeated in the following election by Chung Bong-ju of the liberal Uri Party. Chung unsuccessfully ran for re-election in 2008, being defeated by Hyun Gyoung-byoung of the conservative Grand National Party. However, Hyun lost his seat on June 10, 2011, having been found guilty of receiving ₩30,000,000. A by-election for Nowon A was not held as South Korean election law does not allow for by-elections to held when less than one year is left until the next election.

In the 2012 South Korean legislative election, former mayor of Nowon District Lee No-keun of the conservative Saenuri Party won the seat. Lee narrowly lost to Democratic Party challenger Koh Yong-jin in the following election, having lost by less than three points. A return match between Koh and Lee unfolded in the 2020 election, which saw Koh secure 56.78 and defeat Lee by more than eighteen points. Ahead of the 2024 South Korean legislative election, Woo Won-shik was designated as the Democratic Party's candidate after defeating incumbent Koh Yong-jin in a party primary. The People Power Party nominated former assemblyman Hyun Gyoung-byoung. Woo went on to defeat Hyun in the general election, securing 58.99% of the vote.

== Boundaries ==
The constituency encompasses the neighborhoods of Wolgye-dong, Gongneung-dong, and Junggye-dong. It borders the constituencies of Nowon B to the north, Dobong A to the northwest, Gangbuk B to the west, Seongbuk B to the southwest, Jungnang B to the south, and Guri to the east.

== List of members of the National Assembly ==
Election	Member	Party	Dates	Notes
1988	Baek Nam-chi	Reunification Democratic	1988–2000	Left the Grand National Party and joined the United Liberal Democrats on February 23, 2000
1992	Baek Nam-chi	Democratic Liberal	1988–2000	Left the Grand National Party and joined the United Liberal Democrats on February 23, 2000
1996	Baek Nam-chi	New Korea (Note: merged into the Grand National Party on November 21, 1997)	1988–2000	Left the Grand National Party and joined the United Liberal Democrats on February 23, 2000
2000	Ham Seung-hee	Millennium Democratic	2000–2004	Chiarman of the Kangwon Land (2014–2017)
2004	Chung Bong-ju	Uri	2004–2008	
2008	Hyun Gyoung-byoung	Grand National	2008–2011	Lost seat on June 10, 2011, for receiving illegal political campaign funds
2012	Lee No-keun	Saenuri	2012–2016	Acting Mayor of Jongno (2002); Mayor of Nowon (2006–2010)
2016	Koh Yong-jin	Democratic	2016–2024	Secretary-General of the National Assembly (2026–)
2020	Koh Yong-jin	Democratic	2016–2024	Secretary-General of the National Assembly (2026–)
2024	Woo Won-shik	Democratic	2024–present	Floor Leader of Democratic Party (2017–2018); Speaker of the National Assembly (2024–2026)

== Election results ==
=== 2024 ===
Legislative Election 2024: Nowon A
Party	Candidate	Votes	%	±%
Democratic	Woo Won-shik	91,986	58.99	▲2.21
People Power	Hyun Gyoung-byoung	63,924	41.00	▲2.26
Rejected ballots		2,561	–	
Turnout		158,471	70.69	▲0.77
Registered electors		224,187		
Democratic hold		Swing		

=== 2020 ===
Legislative Election 2020: Nowon A
Party	Candidate	Votes	%	±%
Democratic	Koh Yong-jin	53,911	56.78	▲14.99
United Future	Lee No-keun	36,782	38.74	▼0.63
Minjung	Choi Na-yeong	3,761	3.96	new
National Revolutionary	Cho Deok-sil	487	0.51	new
Rejected ballots		1,092	–	
Turnout		96,033	69.92	▲7.63
Registered electors		138,917		
Democratic hold		Swing		

=== 2016 ===
Legislative Election 2016: Nowon A
Party	Candidate	Votes	%	±%
Democratic	Koh Yong-jin	36,205	41.79	▼2.41
Saenuri	Lee No-keun	34,109	39.37	▼10.69
People	Lee Hyung-nam	16,309	18.82	new
Rejected ballots		981	–	
Turnout		87,604	62.29	▲4.88
Registered electors		140,642		
Democratic gain from Saenuri		Swing		

=== 2012 ===
Legislative Election 2012: Nowon A
Party	Candidate	Votes	%	±%
Saenuri	Lee No-keun	40,865	50.06	▲8.48
Democratic United	Kim Yong-min	36,083	44.20	▲6.58
Independent	Woo Seung-bae	2,913	3.56	new
Liberty Forward	Kim Cheol-soo	1,761	2.15	new
Rejected ballots		692	–	
Turnout		82,314	57.41	▲8.33
Registered electors		143,388		
Saenuri hold		Swing		

=== 2008 ===
Legislative Election 2008: Nowon A
Party	Candidate	Votes	%	±%
Grand National	Hyun Gyoung-byoung	29,010	41.58	▲11.0
United Democratic	Chung Bong-ju	26,251	37.62	new
Pro-Park	Ham Seung-hee	12,098	17.34	new
New Progressive	Kim Ui-yul	1,795	2.57	new
Family Party for Peace and Unity	Wi In-kyu	613	0.87	new
Rejected ballots		466	–	
Turnout		70,233	49.08	▼15.21
Registered electors		143,108		
Grand National gain from United Democratic		Swing		

=== 2004 ===
Legislative Election 2004: Nowon A
Party	Candidate	Votes	%	±%
Uri	Chung Bong-ju	36,992	42.69	new
Grand National	Hyun Gyoung-byoung	26,496	30.58	▼5.8
Millennium Democratic	Ham Seung-hee	23,154	26.72	▼16.45
Rejected ballots		955	–	
Turnout		87,597	64.29	▲9.14
Registered electors		136,263		
Uri gain from Millennium Democratic		Swing		

=== 2000 ===
Legislative Election 2000: Nowon A
Party	Candidate	Votes	%	±%
Millennium Democratic	Ham Seung-hee	50,745	43.17	new
Grand National	Choe Dong-kyu	42,772	36.38	▼0.39
United Liberal Democrats	Baek Nam-chi	11,491	9.77	▼5.76
Democratic Labor	Lee Sang-hyun	7,931	6.74	new
Democratic People's	Chung Chang-in	2,422	2.06	new
Youth Progressive	Park Hee-taek	2,184	1.85	new
Rejected ballots		1,086	–	
Turnout		118,631	55.15	▼5.9
Registered electors		215,106		
Millennium Democratic gain from United Liberal Democrats		Swing		

=== 1996 ===
Legislative Election 1996: Nowon A
Party	Candidate	Votes	%	±%
New Korea	Baek Nam-chi	43,859	36.77	▲1.86
National Congress	Ko Young-ha	41,906	35.13	–
United Liberal Democrats	Park Byung-il	18,529	15.53	–
Democratic	Yoo Young-rae	11,503	9.64	–
Independent	Park Nam-su	3,479	2.91	–
Rejected ballots		1,773	–	
Turnout		121,049	61.05	▼7.57
Registered electors		198,266		
New Korea hold		Swing		

=== 1992 ===
Legislative Election 1992: Nowon A
Party	Candidate	Votes	%	±%
Democratic Liberal	Baek Nam-chi	42,487	34.91	new
Democratic	Ko Young-ha	40,517	33.29	new
Unification National	Park Byung-il	38,684	31.78	new
Rejected ballots		1,092	–	
Turnout		124,292	68.62	▲0.72
Registered electors		181,137		
Democratic Liberal hold		Swing		

=== 1988 ===
Legislative Election 1988: Nowon A
Party	Candidate	Votes	%	±%
Reunification Democratic	Baek Nam-chi	25,699	28.46	–
Peace Democratic	Park Byung-il	24,602	27.25	–
Democratic Justice	An Dae-ryun	21,754	24.09	–
New Democratic Republican	Sung Jang-ki	10,640	11.78	–
Hankyoreh Democratic	Yoo Ihn-tae	7,575	8.39	–
Rejected ballots		723	–	
Turnout		90,993	67.90	–
Registered electors		134,013		
Reunification Democratic win (new seat)				

== See also ==
- List of constituencies of the National Assembly of South Korea
