= Cho Sang-ho =

South Korean politician (born 1970)

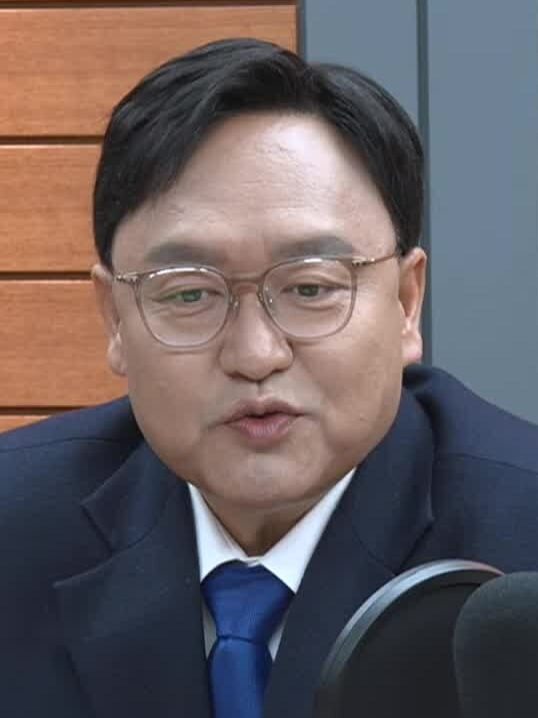
- Cho in 2026

Mayor of Sejong City
- Incumbent
- Assumed office 1 July 2026
- Preceded by: Choi Min-ho

Personal details
- Born: 25 September 1970 (age 56) Seoul, South Korea

Korean name
- Hangul: 조상호
- RR: Jo Sangho
- MR: Cho Sangho

Cho Sang-ho (Korean: 조상호; born 25 September 1970) is a South Korean politician who has served as the mayor of Sejong City since 2026. He is a member of the Democratic Party.

== Election results ==
=== Local elections ===
==== Mayor of Sejong ====
Year	Elections	Constituency	Political party	Votes (%)	Remarks
2026	9th Iocal Election	Sejong (Mayoral Elections)	Democratic	116,846 (61.03%)	Won
