= Hong Jung-wook =

South Korean businessman and politician

Ryan Jungwook Hong
- Education: Choate Rosemary Hall; Harvard University (A.B.); Stanford Law School (J.D.)
- Occupations: Chairman of Organica; Chairman of WWF-Korea founder of Olje Foundation; Trustee of Choate Rosemary Hall and National Museum of Korea
- Website: jwhong.com

Ryan Jungwook Hong (Korean: 홍정욱) is a Korean entrepreneur, philanthropist, politician, and author. Hong is the founding chairman of Organica, a pioneering Korean natural food company. Hong also heads Olje Foundation, a non-profit organization promoting classics education, and chairs World Wide Fund for Nature Korea (WWF Korea).

== Biography ==
Ryan Jungwook Hong, son of acclaimed Korean actor Won Namgung (Kyungil Hong), attended Apgujeong Elementary School and Apgujeong Middle School in Seoul before leaving for the United States in 1985. He graduated from Choate Rosemary Hall in 1989, earned his A.B. in East Asian Studies from Harvard University in 1993, and a J.D. from Stanford Law School in 1998. He also studied political science at Seoul National University in Korea and international politics at the graduate school of Peking University in China.

After passing the New York State Bar in 1998, Hong joined the Mergers and Acquisitions Group at Lehman Brothers in New York, departing in 1999 to co-found an internet startup in California. Returning to Korea in 2001 for military service, he later acquired the financially distressed Herald corporation - a venerable media group and publisher of The Korea Herald and The Herald Business in 2002 - leading a swift turnaround and expanding its operations across digital media, broadcasting, magazines, and education.

In 2008, Hong stepped down as chairman of Herald corporation upon his election to the National Assembly of the Republic of Korea, representing Nowon District in Seoul. Serving on the Foreign Affairs, Trade and Unification Committee, he chaired the ruling Grand National Party's International Affairs Committee and the Honorary Ambassador of Grant Aid for the Korean government, while advancing legislative reforms for parliamentary governance. He declined reelection in 2012 and returned to the private sector.

Hong subsequently repositioned Herald corporation as an integrated media and lifestyle group spanning media, education, natural foods, and biodegradable materials, achieving 14 consecutive years of profitability through its sale in 2019. In 2013, guided by the belief that “within nature lies cure for humanity,” he founded Organica, a premium natural foods company, and has since expanded its platform through strategic acquisitions, positioning it as a leading benchmark for natural foods in Korea.

== Philanthropy ==
In 2011, Hong established Olje Foundation, a non-profit organization promoting classics publication and education by offering Olje Classics and Olje Selections – to the public at low costs and donating 20% of the books to schools, libraries, armed forces, prisons, etc. He has also long prioritized environmental issues - to protect endangered species and increase the awareness of climate change - in his philanthropic work. A board member of World Wide Fund for Nature (WWF) Korea since 2017, he currently serves as its Chairman. Hong has served on the board of the National Museum of Korea since 2008 and been a trustee of Choate Rosemary Hall since 2016.

== Recognition ==
In 2005, Hong was selected as a Young Global Leader by the World Economic Forum in 2005, an Asia 21 Fellow by Asia Society in 2006, and a Young World Leader by the BMW Foundation Herbert Quandt in 2008. During his 4-year term in the National Assembly of the Republic of Korea, he won numerous honors and received an honorary doctorate degree in political science at Yongin University. In 2024, he received the Lifetime Contribution Award from the National Museum of Korea.

== Publication ==
In 1993, Hong authored 7 Acts 7 Scenes, a memoir of his experience in the U.S. and China, which has sold over 1.3 million copies to date. In 2021, he published 50: Hong Jungwook Essays, which also topped Korea's bestseller list.

== Election results ==
Year	Elections	Constituency	Political party	Votes (%)	Results
2008	18th National Assembly General Election	Nowon C (Seoul)	GNP	34,554 (43.10%)	Won
