= Mayor of Sejong City =

- 세종특별자치시장
- Seal of Sejong City

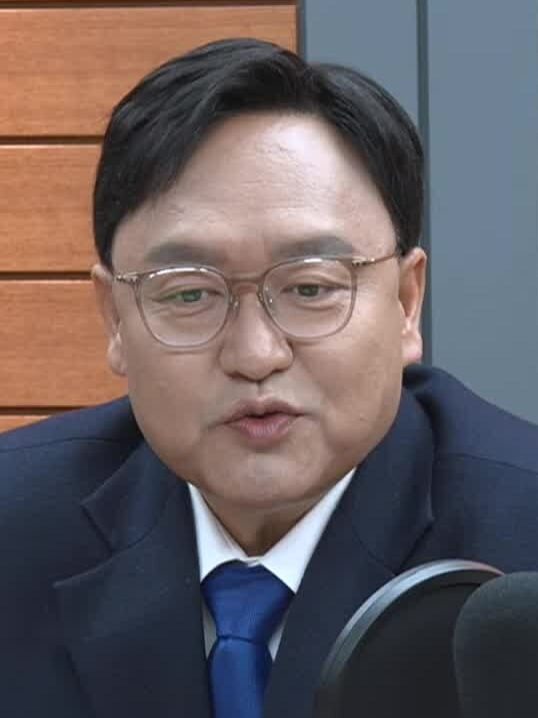
- Incumbent; Cho Sang-ho since 1 July 2026
- Term length: Four years
- Inaugural holder: Yoo Han-sik
- Formation: 1 July 2012; 14 years ago

The Mayor of Sejong City (Korean: 세종특별자치시장; Hanja: 世宗特別自治市長) is the head of the local government of Sejong City who is elected to a four-year term.

== List of mayors ==
Political parties
Conservative
Liberal

| Term | Portrait | Name (Birth–Death) | Term of office | | | Political party | Elected |
| Term | Portrait | Name (Birth–Death) | Took office | Left office | Time in office | Political party | Elected |
|---|---|---|---|---|---|---|---|
| 5th | | Yoo Han-sik 유한식 兪漢植 (born 1949) | 1 July 2012 | 30 June 2014 | 2 years, 0 days | Liberty Forward → Saenuri | 2012 (by-el.) |
| 6th | | Lee Choon-hee 이춘희 李春熙 (born 1955) | 1 July 2014 | 30 June 2022 | 8 years, 0 days | NPAD → Democratic | 2014 |
| 7th | | Lee Choon-hee 이춘희 李春熙 (born 1955) | 1 July 2014 | 30 June 2022 | 8 years, 0 days | NPAD → Democratic | 2018 |
| 8th | | Choi Min-ho 최민호 崔旼鎬 (born 1956) | 1 July 2022 | 30 June 2026 | 4 years, 0 days | People Power | 2022 |
| 9th | | Cho Sang-ho 조상호 趙相鎬 (born 1970) | 1 July 2026 | Incumbent | 69 days | Democratic | 2026 |

== Elections ==
=== 2012 (by-election) ===
2012 Sejong mayoral by-election
| Party | # | Candidate | Votes | Percentage |
|---|---|---|---|---|
| Liberty Forward | 3 | Yoo Han-sik | 19,387 | 41.73% |
| Democratic United | 2 | Lee Choon-hee | 17,349 | 37.35% |
| Saenuri | 1 | Choi Min-ho | 9,716 | 20.92% |
| Total | | | 46,452 | 100.00% |
| Voter turnout | | | 59.14% | |

=== 2014 ===
2014 Sejong mayoral election
| Party | # | Candidate | Votes | Percentage |
|---|---|---|---|---|
| NPAD | 2 | Lee Choon-hee | 36,203 | 57.78% |
| Saenuri | 1 | Yoo Han-sik | 26,451 | 42.21% |
| Total | | | 62,654 | 100.00% |
| Voter turnout | | | 62.65% | |

=== 2018 ===
2018 Sejong mayoral election
| Party | # | Candidate | Votes | Percentage |
|---|---|---|---|---|
| Democratic | 1 | Lee Choon-hee | 96,896 | 71.30% |
| Liberty Korea | 2 | Song Ah-young | 24,546 | 18.06% |
| Bareunmirae | 3 | Heo Chul-hue | 14,444 | 10.62% |
| Total | | | 135,886 | 100.00% |
| Voter turnout | | | 61.75% | |

=== 2022 ===
2022 Sejong mayoral election
| Party | # | Candidate | Votes | Percentage |
|---|---|---|---|---|
| People Power | 2 | Choi Min-ho | 78,415 | 52.83% |
| Democratic | 1 | Lee Choon-hee | 69,995 | 47.16% |
| Total | | | 148,410 | 100.00% |
| Voter turnout | | | 51.24% | |

=== 2026 ===
| Candidate | Party | Votes | % |
|---|---|---|---|
| Cho Sang-ho | Democratic Party | 116,846 | 61.04 |
| Choi Min-ho (incumbent) | People Power Party | 68,944 | 36.02 |
| Ha Heon-hwi | Reform Party | 5,641 | 2.95 |
| Total | | 191,431 | 100.00 |
| Valid votes | | 191,431 | 99.08 |
| Invalid/blank votes | | 1,784 | 0.92 |
| Total votes | | 193,215 | 100.00 |
| Registered voters/turnout | | 309,134 | 62.50 |
| Democratic gain from People Power | | | |

== See also ==
- Government of South Korea
- Politics of South Korea
