= 2018 South Korean by-elections =

The 2018 South Korean by-elections was held in South Korea on 13 June 2018, coinciding with the local elections. 12 seats to the National Assembly of South Korea were contested.

== Reasons for by-elections ==
The following Members of National Assembly lost or resigned from their seats:

- Seoul Nowon C District: Ahn Cheol-soo (People's), due to Ahn's candidacy for the President of South Korea.
- Seoul Songpa B District: Choi Myung-gil (People's), due to Choi's violation of the Public Official Election Act.
- Busan Haeundae B District: Bae Duk-kwang (Liberty Korea), due to Bae's resignation from the National Assembly.
- Incheon Namdong A District: Park Nam-choon (Democratic), due to Park's resignation from the National Assembly, to run 2018 Incheon mayoral election.
- Gwangju Seo A District: Song Gi-seok (People's), due to Song's violation of the Public Official Election Act and embezzlement.
- Ulsan Buk District: Yoon Jong-oh (Minjung), due to Yoon's violation of the Public Official Election Act.
- North Chungcheong Jecheon-Danyang District: Kwon Suk-chang (Liberty Korea), due to Kwok's violation of the Public Official Election Act.
- South Chungcheong Cheonan A District: Park Chan-woo (Liberty Korea), due to Park's violation of the Public Official Election Act.
- South Chungcheong Cheonan C District: Yang Seung-cho (Democratic), due to Yang's resignation from the National Assembly, to run 2018 South Chungcheong Province gubernatorial election.
- South Jeolla Yeongam–Muan–Sinan District: Park Jun-yeong (Democracy and Peace), due to Park's violation of the Public Official Election Act.
- North Gyeongsang Gimcheon District: Lee Cheol-woo (Liberty Korea), due to Lee's resignation from the National Assembly, to run 2018 North Gyeongsang Province gubernatorial election.
- South Gyeongsang Gimhae B District: Kim Kyung-soo (Democratic), due to Kim's resignation from the National Assembly, to run 2018 South Gyeongsang Province gubernatorial election.

== Results ==
=== Seat control ===
Seat	Previous member	Party	Elected member	Party
Seoul Nowon C	Ahn Cheol-soo	Bareunmirae	Kim Sung-hwan	Democratic
Seoul Songpa B	Choi Myung-gil	Bareunmirae	Choi Jae-sung	Democratic
Busan Haeundae B	Bae Duk-kwang	Liberty Korea	Yun Jun-ho	Democratic
Incheon Namdong A	Park Nam-choon	Democratic	Meng Sung-kyu	Democratic
Gwangju Seo A	Song Gi-seok	Bareunmirae	Song Gap-suk	Democratic
Ulsan Buk	Yoon Jong-oh	Minjung	Lee Sang-hun	Democratic
Jecheon-Danyang	Kwon Suk-chang	Liberty Korea	Lee Hu-sam	Democratic
Cheonan A	Park Chan-woo	Liberty Korea	Lee Gyu-hee	Democratic
Cheonan C	Yang Seung-cho	Democratic	Yun Il-kyu	Democratic
Yeongam–Muan–Sinan	Park Jun-yeong	Democracy and Peace	Seo Sam-suk	Democratic
Gimcheon	Lee Cheol-woo	Liberty Korea	Song Un-suk	Liberty Korea
Gimhae B	Kim Kyung-soo	Democratic	Kim Jung-ho	Democratic
