= Mayor of Daegu =

- 대구광역시장
- Seal of Daegu

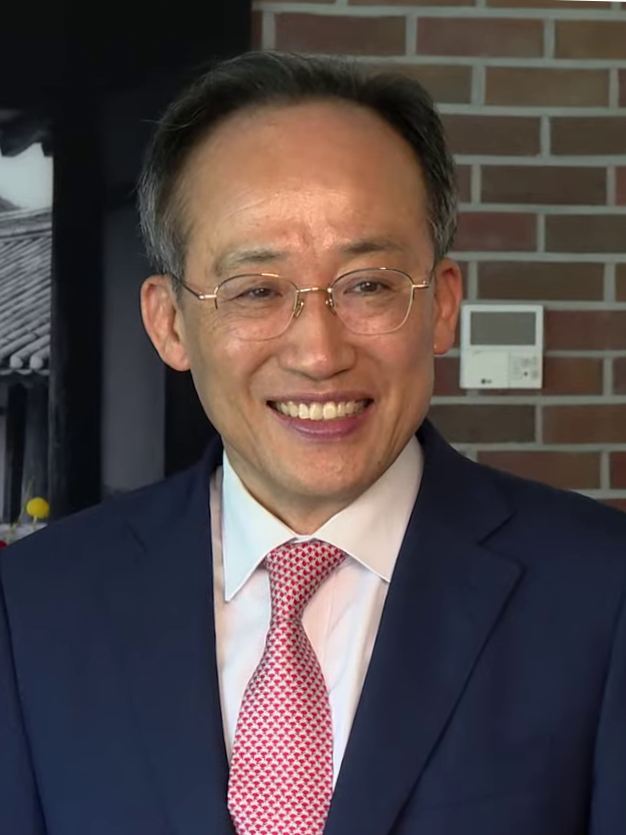
- Incumbent; Choo Kyung-ho since 1 July 2026
- Term length: Four years
- Inaugural holder: Lee Kyung-hee
- Formation: 16 August 1945; 81 years ago

The Mayor of Daegu (Korean: 대구광역시장; Hanja: 大邱廣域市長) is the head of the local government of Daegu who is elected to a four-year term.

== List of mayors ==
=== Appointed mayors (before 1995) ===
From 1945 to 1995, the Mayor of Daegu was appointed by the President of the Republic of Korea.

=== Directly elected mayors (1995–present) ===
Since 1995, under provisions of the revised Local Government Act, the Mayor of Daegu is elected by direct election.

Political parties
Conservative
Independent
Status
Denotes acting mayor

Term	Portrait	Name (Birth–Death)	Term of office			Political party	Elected
Term	Portrait	Name (Birth–Death)	Took office	Left office	Time in office	Political party	Elected
1st		Moon Hee-gap 문희갑 文熹甲 (born 1937)	1 July 1995	30 June 2002	7 years, 0 days	Independent → Grand National	1995
2nd		Moon Hee-gap 문희갑 文熹甲 (born 1937)	1 July 1995	30 June 2002	7 years, 0 days	Independent → Grand National	1998
3rd		Cho Hae-nyung 조해녕 曺海寧 (born 1943)	1 July 2002	30 June 2006	4 years, 0 days	Grand National	2002
4th		Kim Bum-il 김범일 金範鎰 (born 1950)	1 July 2006	30 June 2014	8 years, 0 days	Grand National → Saenuri	2006
5th		Kim Bum-il 김범일 金範鎰 (born 1950)	1 July 2006	30 June 2014	8 years, 0 days	Grand National → Saenuri	2010
6th		Kwon Young-jin 권영진 權泳臻 (born 1962)	1 July 2014	30 June 2022	8 years, 0 days	Saenuri → Liberty Korea → United Future → People Power	2014
7th		Kwon Young-jin 권영진 權泳臻 (born 1962)	1 July 2014	30 June 2022	8 years, 0 days	Saenuri → Liberty Korea → United Future → People Power	2018
8th		Hong Joon-pyo 홍준표 洪準杓 (born 1953)	1 July 2022	11 April 2025	2 years, 285 days	People Power	2022
8th		Kim Jeong-gi 김정기 金正基	11 April 2025	30 June 2026	1 year, 81 days	Independent	—
9th		Choo Kyung-ho 추경호 秋慶鎬 (born 1960)	1 July 2026	Incumbent	69 days	People Power	2026

== Elections ==
=== 1995 ===
1995 Daegu mayoral election
Party	#	Candidate	Votes	Percentage
Independent	3	Moon Hee-gap	383,272	36.79%
United Liberal Democrats	2	Lee Eui-ik	230,668	22.14%
Independent	5	Lee Hae-bong	222,409	21.35%
Democratic Liberal	1	Cho Hae-nyung	175,749	16.87%
Independent	4	Ahn Yu-ho	29,617	2.84%
Total			1,041,715	100.00%
Voter turnout			63.97%	

=== 1998 ===
1998 Daegu mayoral election
Party	#	Candidate	Votes	Percentage
Grand National	1	Moon Hee-gap	570,167	71.98%
United Liberal Democrats	3	Lee Eui-ik	163,653	20.66%
New National	4	Yoo Sung-hwan	58,243	7.35%
Total			792,063	100.00%
Voter turnout			46.81%	

=== 2002 ===
2002 Daegu mayoral election
Party	#	Candidate	Votes	Percentage
Grand National	1	Cho Hae-nyung	452,943	61.18%
Independent	3	Lee Jae-yong	287,396	38.81%
Total			740,339	100.00%
Voter turnout			41.45%	

=== 2006 ===
2006 Daegu mayoral election
Party	#	Candidate	Votes	Percentage
Grand National	2	Kim Bum-il	636,057	70.15%
Uri	1	Lee Jae-yong	191,131	21.08%
Democratic Labor	4	Lee Youn-jae	35,497	3.91%
Independent	6	Paik Seung-hong	35,232	3.88%
People First	5	Park Seung-gook	8,764	0.96%
Total			906,681	100.00%
Voter turnout			48.54%	

=== 2010 ===
2010 Daegu mayoral election
Party	#	Candidate	Votes	Percentage
Grand National	1	Kim Bum-il	633,118	72.92%
Democratic	2	Lee Seung-cheon	146,458	16.86%
New Progressive	7	Cho Myung-rae	88,599	10.20%
Total			868,175	100.00%
Voter turnout			45.94%	

=== 2014 ===
2014 Daegu mayoral election
Party	#	Candidate	Votes	Percentage
Saenuri	1	Kwon Young-jin	581,175	55.95%
NPAD	2	Kim Boo-kyum	418,891	40.33%
Independent	5	Lee Jung-sook	14,774	1.42%
Justice	4	Lee Won-joon	12,922	1.24%
Unified Progressive	3	Song Young-woo	10,857	1.04%
Total			1,038,619	100.00%
Voter turnout			52.30%	

=== 2018 ===
2018 Daegu mayoral election
Party	#	Candidate	Votes	Percentage
Liberty Korea	2	Kwon Young-jin	619,165	53.73%
Democratic	1	Lim Dae-yun	458,112	39.75%
Bareunmirae	3	Kim Hyung-gi	74,955	6.50%
Total			1,152,232	100.00%
Voter turnout			57.26%	

=== 2022 ===
2022 Daegu mayoral election
Party	#	Candidate	Votes	Percentage
People Power	2	Hong Joon-pyo	685,159	78.75%
Democratic	1	Seo Jae-heon	156,429	17.97%
Justice	3	Han Min-jeong	20,904	2.40%
Basic Income	4	Shin Won-ho	7,542	0.86%
Total			870,034	100.00%
Voter turnout			43.19%	

=== 2026 ===
Candidate	Party	Votes	%
Choo Kyung-ho	People Power Party	702,421	53.92
Kim Boo-kyum	Democratic Party	586,927	45.06
Lee Su-chan	Reform Party	13,324	1.02
Total		1,302,672	100.00
Valid votes		1,302,672	98.92
Invalid/blank votes		14,158	1.08
Total votes		1,316,830	100.00
Registered voters/turnout		2,049,683	64.25
People Power hold			

== See also ==
- Government of South Korea
- Politics of South Korea
