= Buk District, Ulsan =

Coordinates: 35°34′53″N 129°21′40″E

Buk
- Autonomous District
- Flag

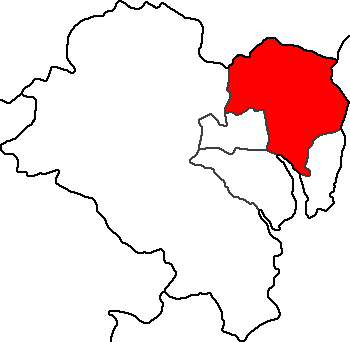
- Country: South Korea
- Region: Yeongnam
- Provincial level: Ulsan
- Administrative divisions: 27 administrative dong

Government
  - Mayor: Lee Dong-kweon (Democratic)

Area
  - Total: 80.41 km^{2} (31.05 sq mi)

Population (2024)
  - Total: 216,561
  - Density: 2,693/km^{2} (6,975/sq mi)
  - Dialect: Gyeongsang
- Website: Buk District Office

Korean name
- Hangul: 북구
- Hanja: 北區
- RR: Buk-gu
- MR: Puk-ku

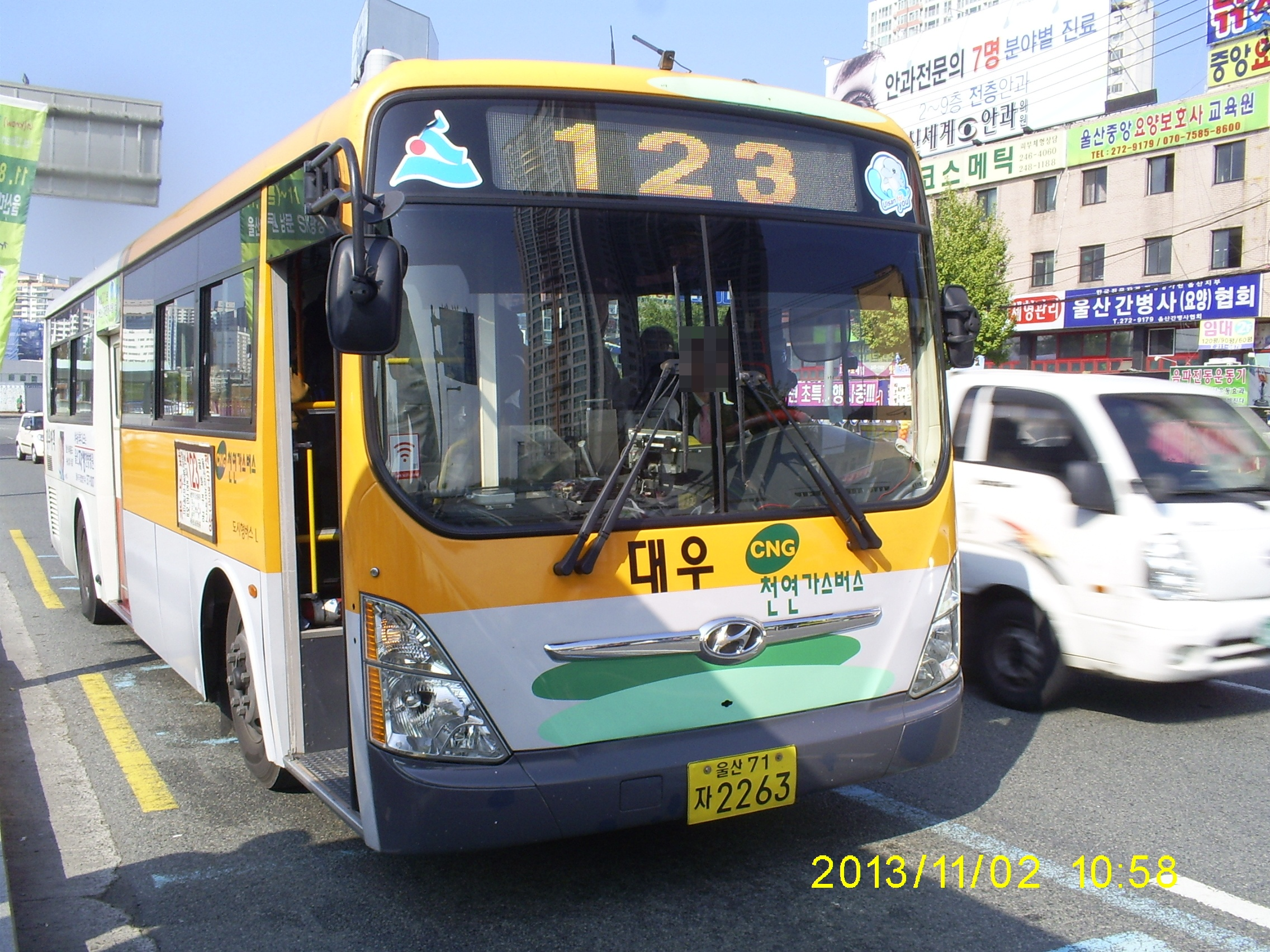
Ulsan City Bus No.123

Buk District (Korean: 북구; lit. 'north district') is a gu, or district, in north central Ulsan, South Korea. It stretches roughly from the Ring Road to Mohwa into the north and out to the coast in the east.

== Demographics ==
149,676 people live in Buk-gu's 80.41 km^{2}. 77,214 of these are Korean males, 71,183 are Korean females, 961 are foreign males and 318 are foreign females (2006). In no dong do women outnumber men.

== Administrative divisions ==
The dong of Buk-gu are:

- Changpyeong-dong (창평동)
- Cheongok-dong (천곡동)
- Daean-dong (대안동)
- Dalcheon-dong (달천동)
- Dangsa-dong (당사동)
- Eomul-dong (어물동)
- Gadae-dong (가대동)
- Guyu-dong (구유동)
- Hogye-dong (호계동)
- Hwabong-dong (화봉동)
- Hyomun-dong (효문동)
- Jeongja-dong (정자동)
- Jinjang-dong (진장동)
- Jungsan-dong (중산동)
- Maegok-dong (매곡동)
- Muryong-dong (무룡동)
- Myeongchon-dong (명촌동)
- Sanha-dong (산하동)
- Sinhyeon-dong (신현동)
- Sinjeon-dong (신전동)
- Sinmyeong-dong (신명동)
- Sangan-dong (상안동)
- Sirae-dong (시래동)
- Songjeong-dong (송정동)
- Yangjeong-dong (양정동)
- Yeompo-dong (염포동)
- Yeonam-dong (연암동)

== Local attractions ==
- Jeongja Beach (정자 해수욕장)

Jeongja Beach (정자 해수욕장) is the most popular in Ulsan and there are several raw fish restaurants and pleasant western restaurants-come-bars lining the coast road around here. Most people in Ulsan go here infrequently, however, as it lies at the other end of a twisted road over the hills just south of Muryongsan (무룡산), Ulsan's second-highest hill.

- Jujeon Mongdol beach (주전몽돌해변)

Jujeon Mongdol beach (주전몽돌해변) is a beach that connects Jujeon (주전) and Gangdong (강동) and its length is about 1.5 km. It was also selected as one of the "12 must-see natural sights of Ulsan2 by Ulsan Metropolitan Government. Different from most beaches that are covered with sand, Junjeon Mongdol beach is covered with smooth pebble stones. Especially the seaside course that connects Jujeon (주전)-Jengja (정자)-Gangdong (강동) is well known for the best drive course of Ulsan.

== Education ==
=== High school ===
- Dalcheon High School
- Maegok High School
- Ulsan Dongcheon High School
- Ulsan Sports Science High School
- Ulsan Foreign Language High School
- Ulsan Energy High School
- ULSAN HOGYE HIGHSCHOOL
- Hwabong High School
- Hyojung High School

=== Middle school ===
- Kangdong Middle School
- Goheon Middle School
- Nongso Middle School
- Dalchun Middle School
- Maegok Middle School
- Sangan Middle School
- Yeonam Middle School
- Ulsan Sports Science Middle School
- Ehwa Middle School
- Cheongok Middle School
- Hogye Middle School
- Hyojung Middle school

== Transport ==
Transport in Buk-gu is simple, as most of the population are in striking distance of either the Ring Road or National Road 7, which is the main road up the East Coast of South Korea and which, at this point, connects Ulsan with Gyeongju to the north. Ulsan's domestic airport (IATA Code: USN), which serves Seoul is located in Buk-gu.

=== Port and Fishing Harbor Status in Buk District ===
- National Fishing Harbor: Jeongja Harbor
- Local Fishing Harbor: Dangsa Harbor
- Fishing Villages (Resident Fishing Harbors): Gumbaou Harbor, Sinmyeong Harbor, Eomul Harbor, Jejeon Harbor
- Small-Scale Fishing Harbors: Uga Harbor, Upper Uga Harbor, Panji Harbor, Hwaam Harbor

== Sister cities ==
- Nokwon-gu

== See also ==
List of districts in South Korea Buk-gu, Ulsan (South Korea electorate)
