= List of members of the National Assembly (South Korea), 2008–2012 =

The members of the eighteenth National Assembly of South Korea were elected on 9 April 2008. The Assembly sat from 30 May 2008 until 29 May 2012.

== Members ==
Province/city	Constituency	Member	Party	
Province/city	Constituency	Member	At election	At term's end
Seoul	Jongno	Park Jin	GNP	Saenuri
Seoul	Jung	Na Kyung-won (Note: Na Kyung-won resigned on 28 September 2011, to run in the 2011 Seoul mayoral by-election.)	GNP	GNP
Seoul	Yongsan	Chin Young	GNP	Saenuri
Seoul	Seongdong A	Chin Soo-hee	GNP	Saenuri
Seoul	Seongdong B	Kim Dong-sung	GNP	Saenuri
Seoul	Gwangjin A	Kwon Teag-ky	GNP	Saenuri
Seoul	Gwangjin B	Choo Mi-ae	UDP	DUP
Seoul	Dongdaemun A	Jang Kwang-keun (Note: Jang Kwang-keun was removed on 15 March 2012, after his election was invalidated.)	GNP	Saenuri
Seoul	Dongdaemun B	Hong Joon-pyo	GNP	Saenuri
Seoul	Jungnang A	You Jung-hyun	GNP	Independent
Seoul	Jungnang B	Jin Seong-ho	GNP	Independent
Seoul	Seongbuk A	Jeong Tae-keun	GNP	Independent
Seoul	Seongbuk B	Kim Hyo-jae (Note: Kim Hyo-jae resigned on 4 August 2011, upon being appointed as Senior Presidential Secretary for Political Affairs.)	GNP	GNP
Seoul	Gangbuk A	Cheong Yang-seog	GNP	Saenuri
Seoul	Gangbuk B	Choe Kyoo-sik	UDP	DUP
Seoul	Dobong A	Shin Ji-ho	GNP	Saenuri
Seoul	Dobong B	Kim Seon-dong	GNP	Saenuri
Seoul	Nowon A	Hyun Gyoung-byoung (Note: Hyun Gyoung-byoung was removed on 11 June 2010, after his election was invalidated.)	GNP	GNP
Seoul	Nowon B	Kwon Young-jin	GNP	Saenuri
Seoul	Nowon C	Hong Jung-wook	GNP	Saenuri
Seoul	Eunpyeong A	Lee Mi-kyung	UDP	DUP
Seoul	Eunpyeong B	Moon Kook-hyun (Note: Moon Kook-hyun was removed on 22 October 2009, after his election was invalidated.)	CKP	CKP
Seoul	Eunpyeong B	Lee Jae-oh (Note: Lee Jae-oh was by-elected on 28 July 2010, to succeed Moon Kook-hyun.)	GNP	Saenuri
Seoul	Seodaemun A	Lee Sung-hun	GNP	Saenuri
Seoul	Seodaemun B	Chung Doo-un	GNP	Saenuri
Seoul	Mapo A	Kang Seung-kyoo	GNP	Saenuri
Seoul	Mapo B	Kang Yong-seok	GNP	Independent
Seoul	Yangcheon A	Won Hee-ryong	GNP	Saenuri
Seoul	Yangcheon B	Kim Yong-tae	GNP	Saenuri
Seoul	Gangseo A	Gu Sang-chan	GNP	Saenuri
Seoul	Gangseo B	Kim Sung-tae	GNP	Saenuri
Seoul	Guro A	Lee Bun-rae	GNP	Saenuri
Seoul	Guro B	Park Young-sun	UDP	DUP
Seoul	Geumcheon	Ahn Hyoung-hwan	GNP	Saenuri
Seoul	Yeongdeungpo A	Chun Yu-ok	GNP	Independent
Seoul	Yeongdeungpo B	Kwon Young-se	GNP	Saenuri
Seoul	Dongjak A	Jun Byung-hun	UDP	DUP
Seoul	Dongjak B	Chung Mong-joon	GNP	Saenuri
Seoul	Gwanak A	Kim Song-sik	GNP	Independent
Seoul	Gwanak B	Kim Hee-chull	UDP	Independent
Seoul	Seocho A	Lee Hye-hoon	GNP	Saenuri
Seoul	Seocho B	Koh Seung-duk	GNP	Saenuri
Seoul	Gangnam A	Lee Jong-koo	GNP	Saenuri
Seoul	Gangnam B	Gong Sung-jin (Note: Gong Sung-jin was removed on 9 June 2011, after his election was invalidated.)	GNP	GNP
Seoul	Songpa A	Park Young-ah	GNP	Saenuri
Seoul	Songpa B	Yoo Il-ho	GNP	Saenuri
Seoul	Songpa C	Kim Sung-soon	UDP	DUP
Seoul	Gangdong A	Kim Choong-whan	GNP	Saenuri
Seoul	Gangdong B	Yoon Seok-yong	GNP	Saenuri
Busan	Jung–Dong	Chung Ui-hwa	GNP	Saenuri
Busan	Seo	Yoo Ki-june	Independent	Saenuri
Busan	Yeongdo	Kim Hyong-o	GNP	Saenuri
Busan	Busanjin A	Hur Won-je	GNP	Saenuri
Busan	Busanjin B	Lee Jong-heuk	GNP	Saenuri
Busan	Dongnae	Lee Jin-bok	Independent	Saenuri
Busan	Nam A	Kim Jung-hoon	GNP	Saenuri
Busan	Nam B	Kim Moo-sung	Independent	Saenuri
Busan	Buk–Gangseo A	Park Min-shik	GNP	Saenuri
Busan	Buk–Gangseo B	Huh Tae-yeol	GNP	Saenuri
Busan	Haeundae–Gijang A	Suh Byung-soo	GNP	Saenuri
Busan	Haeundae–Gijang B	An Kyung-ryul	GNP	Saenuri
Busan	Saha A	Hyun Ki-hwan	GNP	Saenuri
Busan	Saha B	Cho Kyoung-tae	UDP	DUP
Busan	Geumjeong	Kim Se-yeon	Independent	Saenuri
Busan	Yeonje	Park Dae-hae	Pro-Park	Saenuri
Busan	Suyeong	Yoo Jae-jung	Independent	Saenuri
Busan	Sasang	Chang Je-won	GNP	Saenuri
Daegu	Jung–Nam	Bae Young-shik	GNP	Independent
Daegu	Dong A	Joo Sung-young	GNP	Saenuri
Daegu	Dong B	Yoo Seong-min	GNP	Saenuri
Daegu	Seo	Hong Sa-duk	Pro-Park	Saenuri
Daegu	Buk A	Lee Myung-gyu	GNP	Independent
Daegu	Buk B	Suh Sang-kee	GNP	Saenuri
Daegu	Suseong A	Lee Hahn-koo	GNP	Saenuri
Daegu	Suseong B	Joo Ho-young	GNP	Saenuri
Daegu	Dalseo A	Park Jong-keun	Pro-Park	Independent
Daegu	Dalseo B	Lee Hae-bong	Independent	Saenuri
Daegu	Dalseo C	Cho Won-jin	Pro-Park	Saenuri
Daegu	Dalseong	Park Geun-hye	GNP	Saenuri
Incheon	Jung–Dong–Ongjin	Park Sang-eun	GNP	Saenuri
Incheon	Nam A	Hong Il-pyo	GNP	Saenuri
Incheon	Nam B	Yoon Sang-hyun	GNP	Saenuri
Incheon	Yeonsu	Hwang Woo-yea	GNP	Saenuri
Incheon	Namdong A	Lee Yoon-sung	GNP	Independent
Incheon	Namdong B	Cho Jeon-hyeok	GNP	Saenuri
Incheon	Bupyeong A	Cho Jin-hyeong	GNP	Saenuri
Incheon	Bupyeong B	Koo Bon-chul (Note: Koo Bon-chul was removed on 15 January 2009, after his election was invalidated.)	GNP	GNP
Incheon	Bupyeong B	Hong Young-pyo (Note: Hong Young-pyo was by-elected on 29 April 2009, to succeed Koo Bon-chul.)	Democratic	DUP
Incheon	Gyeyang A	Shin Hak-young	UDP	DUP
Incheon	Gyeyang B	Song Young-gil (Note: Song Young-gil resigned on 26 April 2010, to run in the 2010 Incheon mayoral election.)	UDP	Democratic
Incheon	Gyeyang B	Lee Sang-kwon (Note: Lee Sang-kwon was by-elected on 28 July 2010, to succeed Song Young-gil.)	GNP	Saenuri
Incheon	Seo–Ganghwa A	Lee Hag-jae	GNP	Saenuri
Incheon	Seo–Ganghwa B	Lee Kyeong-jae	Independent	Saenuri
Gwangju	Dong	Park Joo-sun	UDP	Independent
Gwangju	Seo A	Cho Young-teck	UDP	Independent
Gwangju	Seo B	Kim Young-jin	UDP	DUP
Gwangju	Nam	Kang Woon-tae (Note: Kang Woon-tae resigned on 7 May 2010, to run in the 2010 Gwangju mayoral election.)	Independent	Democratic
Gwangju	Nam	Chang Byoung-wan (Note: Chang Byoung-wan was by-elected on 28 July 2010, to succeed Kang Woon-tae.)	Democratic	DUP
Gwangju	Buk A	Kang Gi-jung	UDP	DUP
Gwangju	Buk B	Kim Jae-kyun	UDP	Independent
Gwangju	Gwangsan A	Kim Dong-cheol	UDP	DUP
Gwangju	Gwangsan B	Lee Yong-sup	UDP	DUP
Daejeon	Dong	Rim Young-ho	LFP	LFP
Daejeon	Jung	Kwon Sun-taik	LFP	LFP
Daejeon	Seo A	Park Byeong-seug	UDP	DUP
Daejeon	Seo B	Lee Jae-sun	LFP	LFP
Daejeon	Yuseong	Lee Sang-min	LFP	DUP
Daejeon	Daedeok	Kim Chang-su	LFP	Independent
Ulsan	Jung	Jeong Kab-yoon	GNP	Saenuri
Ulsan	Nam A	Choi Byung-gook	GNP	Independent
Ulsan	Nam B	Kim Gi-hyeon	GNP	Saenuri
Ulsan	Dong	Ahn Hyo-dae	GNP	Saenuri
Ulsan	Buk	Yoon Doo-hwan (Note: Yoon Doo-hwan was removed on 12 March 2009.)	GNP	GNP
Ulsan	Buk	Cho Seung-soo (Note: Cho Seung-soo was by-elected on 29 April 2009, to succeed Yoon Doo-hwan.)	NPP	UPP
Ulsan	Ulju	Kang Ghil-boo	Independent	Saenuri
Gyeonggi Province	Jangan, Suwon	Park Jong-hee (Note: Park Jong-hee was removed on 10 September 2009.)	GNP	GNP
Gyeonggi Province	Jangan, Suwon	Lee Chan-yeol (Note: Lee Chan-yeol was by-elected on 28 October 2009, to succeed Park Jong-hee.)	Democratic	DUP
Gyeonggi Province	Gwonseon, Suwon	Chung Mi-kyung	GNP	Independent
Gyeonggi Province	Paldal, Suwon	Nam Kyung-pil	GNP	Saenuri
Gyeonggi Province	Yeongtong, Suwon	Kim Jin-pyo	UDP	DUP
Gyeonggi Province	Sujeong, Seongnam	Shin Young-soo	GNP	Saenuri
Gyeonggi Province	Jungwon, Seongnam	Shin Sang-jin	GNP	Saenuri
Gyeonggi Province	Bundang A, Seongnam	Ko Heung-kil	GNP	Saenuri
Gyeonggi Province	Bundang B, Seongnam	Yim Tae-hee (Note: Yim Tae-hee resigned on 1 October 2010, upon being appointed as Chief of Staff of the President.)	GNP	GNP
Gyeonggi Province	Bundang B, Seongnam	Sohn Hak-kyu (Note: Sohn Hak-kyu was by-elected on 27 April 2011, to succeed Yim Tae-hee.)	Democratic	DUP
Gyeonggi Province	Uijeongbu A	Moon Hee-sang	UDP	DUP
Gyeonggi Province	Uijeongbu B	Kang Sung-jong (Note: Kang Sung-jong was removed on 11 May 2012.)	UDP	DUP
Gyeonggi Province	Manan, Anyang	Lee Jong-kul	UDP	DUP
Gyeonggi Province	Dongan A, Anyang	Lee Seok-hyun	UDP	DUP
Gyeonggi Province	Dongan B, Anyang	Shim Jae-chul	GNP	Saenuri
Gyeonggi Province	Wonmi A, Bucheon	Lim Hae-kyu	GNP	Saenuri
Gyeonggi Province	Wonmi B, Bucheon	Lee Sa-churl	GNP	Saenuri
Gyeonggi Province	Sosa, Bucheon	Cha Myong-jin	GNP	Saenuri
Gyeonggi Province	Ojeong, Bucheon	Won Hye-young	UDP	DUP
Gyeonggi Province	Gwangmyeong A	Baek Jae-hyun	UDP	DUP
Gyeonggi Province	Gwangmyeong B	Jeon Jae-hee	GNP	Saenuri
Gyeonggi Province	Pyeongtaek A	Won Yoo-chul	GNP	Saenuri
Gyeonggi Province	Pyeongtaek B	Jung Jang-seon	UDP	DUP
Gyeonggi Province	Yangju–Dongducheon	Kim Sung-soo	GNP	Saenuri
Gyeonggi Province	Sangnok A, Ansan	Lee Hwa-soo	GNP	Saenuri
Gyeonggi Province	Sangnok B, Ansan	Hong Jang-pyo (Note: Hong Jang-pyo was removed on 23 July 2009, after his election was invalidated.)	Pro-Park	GNP
Gyeonggi Province	Sangnok B, Ansan	Kim Young-hwan (Note: Kim Young-hwan was by-elected on 28 October 2009, to succeed Hong Jang-pyo.)	Democratic	DUP
Gyeonggi Province	Danwon A, Ansan	Chun Jung-bae	UDP	DUP
Gyeonggi Province	Danwon B, Ansan	Park Soon-ja	GNP	Saenuri
Gyeonggi Province	Deokyang A, Goyang	Son Beom-gyu	GNP	Saenuri
Gyeonggi Province	Deokyang B, Goyang	Kim Tae-won	GNP	Saenuri
Gyeonggi Province	Ilsandong, Goyang	Paik Sung-woon	GNP	Saenuri
Gyeonggi Province	Ilsanseo, Goyang	Kim Young-sun	GNP	Saenuri
Gyeonggi Province	Uiwang–Gwacheon	Ahn Sang-soo	GNP	Saenuri
Gyeonggi Province	Guri	Joo Kwang-deok	GNP	Saenuri
Gyeonggi Province	Namyangju A	Choi Jae-sung	UDP	DUP
Gyeonggi Province	Namyangju B	Park Ki-choon	UDP	DUP
Gyeonggi Province	Osan	An Min-suk	UDP	DUP
Gyeonggi Province	Hwaseong A	Kim Sung-hoi	GNP	Saenuri
Gyeonggi Province	Hwaseong B	Park Bo-hwan	GNP	Saenuri
Gyeonggi Province	Siheung A	Baek Won-woo	UDP	DUP
Gyeonggi Province	Siheung B	Cho Jeong-sik	UDP	DUP
Gyeonggi Province	Gunpo	Kim Boo-kyum	UDP	DUP
Gyeonggi Province	Hanam	Moon Hak-jin	UDP	DUP
Gyeonggi Province	Paju	Hwang Jin-ha	GNP	Saenuri
Gyeonggi Province	Cheoin, Yongin	Ooh Che-chang	UDP	DUP
Gyeonggi Province	Giheung, Yongin	Park Jun-seon	GNP	Saenuri
Gyeonggi Province	Suji, Yongin	Han Sun-kyo	Independent	Saenuri
Gyeonggi Province	Anseong	Kim Hack-yong	GNP	Saenuri
Gyeonggi Province	Gimpo	Yoo Jeong-bok	GNP	Saenuri
Gyeonggi Province	Gwangju	Chung Chin-sup	GNP	Independent
Gyeonggi Province	Pocheon–Yeoncheon	Kim Young-woo	GNP	Saenuri
Gyeonggi Province	Icheon–Yeoju	Rhee Beum-kwan	GNP	Saenuri
Gyeonggi Province	Yangpyeong–Gapyeong	Choung Byoung-gug	GNP	Saenuri
Gangwon Province	Chuncheon	Huh Cheon	GNP	Independent
Gangwon Province	Wonju	Lee Ke-jin (Note: Lee Ke-jin resigned on 30 April 2010, to run in the 2010 Gangwon gubernatorial election.)	GNP	GNP
Gangwon Province	Wonju	Park Woo-soon (Note: Park Woo-soon was by-elected on 28 July 2010, to succeed Lee Ke-jin.)	Democratic	DUP
Gangwon Province	Gangneung	Choi Wook-cheul (Note: Choi Wook-cheul was removed on 23 July 2009, after his election was invalidated.)	Independent	Independent
Gangwon Province	Gangneung	Kweon Seong-dong (Note: Kweon Seong-dong was by-elected on 28 October 2009, to succeed Choi Wook-cheul.)	GNP	Saenuri
Gangwon Province	Donghae–Samcheok	Choi Yeon-hee	Independent	Independent
Gangwon Province	Sokcho–Goseong–Yangyang	Song Hun-suk	Independent	DUP
Gangwon Province	Hongcheon–Hoengseong	Hwang Young-cheul	GNP	Saenuri
Gangwon Province	Taebaek–Yeongwol–Pyeongchang–Jeongseon	Lee Kwang-jae (Note: Lee Kwang-jae resigned on 28 April 2010, to run in the 2010 Gangwon Province gubernatorial election.)	UDP	Democratic
Gangwon Province	Taebaek–Yeongwol–Pyeongchang–Jeongseon	Choi Jong-won (Note: Choi Jong-won was by-elected on 28 July 2010, to succeed Lee Kwang-jae.)	Democratic	DUP
Gangwon Province	Cheolwon–Hwacheon–Yanggu–Inje	Lee Yong-sam (Note: Lee Yong-sam died on 20 January 2010.)	UDP	Democratic
Gangwon Province	Cheolwon–Hwacheon–Yanggu–Inje	Han Ki-ho (Note: Han Ki-ho was by-elected on 28 July 2010, to succeed Lee Yong-sam.)	GNP	Saenuri
North Chungcheong Province	Sangdang, Cheongju	Hong Jae-hyong	UDP	DUP
North Chungcheong Province	Heungdeok A, Cheongju	Oh Jae-sae	UDP	DUP
North Chungcheong Province	Heungdeok B, Cheongju	Noh Young-min	UDP	DUP
North Chungcheong Province	Chungju	Lee Si-jong (Note: Lee Si-jong resigned on 12 April 2010, to run in the 2010 North Chungcheong gubernatorial election.)	UDP	Democratic
North Chungcheong Province	Chungju	Yoon Jin-sik (Note: Yoon Jin-sik was by-elected on 28 July 2010, to succeed Lee Si-jong.)	GNP	Saenuri
North Chungcheong Province	Jecheon–Danyang	Song Kwang-ho	GNP	Saenuri
North Chungcheong Province	Cheongwon	Byun Jae-il	UDP	DUP
North Chungcheong Province	Boeun–Okcheon–Yeongdong	Lee Yong-hee	LFP	DUP
North Chungcheong Province	Jeungpyeong–Jincheon–Gwisan–Eumseong	Kim Jong-yull (Note: Kim Jong-yull was removed on 24 September 2009.)	UDP	Democratic
North Chungcheong Province	Jeungpyeong–Jincheon–Gwisan–Eumseong	Jong Bum-goo (Note: Jong Bum-goo was by-elected on 28 October 2009, to succeed Kim Jong-yull.)	Democratic	DUP
South Chungcheong Province	Cheonan A	Yang Seoung-jo	UDP	DUP
South Chungcheong Province	Cheonan B	Park Sang-don (Note: Park Sang-don resigned on 4 May 2010, to run in the 2010 South Chungcheong gubernatorial election.)	LFP	LFP
South Chungcheong Province	Cheonan B	Kim Ho-yeon (Note: Kim Ho-yeon was by-elected on 28 July 2010, to succeed Park Sang-don.)	GNP	Saenuri
South Chungcheong Province	Gongju–Yeongi	Sim Dae-pyung	LFP	LFP
South Chungcheong Province	Boryeong–Seocheon	Ryu Keun-chan	LFP	LFP
South Chungcheong Province	Asan	Lee Myoung-su	LFP	LFP
South Chungcheong Province	Seosan–Taean	Byun Ung-jun	LFP	LFP
South Chungcheong Province	Nonsan–Gyeryong–Geumsan	Rhee In-je	Independent	LFP
South Chungcheong Province	Buyeo–Cheongyang	Lee Jin-sam	LFP	Independent
South Chungcheong Province	Hongseong–Yesan	Lee Hoi-chang	LFP	Independent
South Chungcheong Province	Dangjin	Kim Nak-sung	LFP	LFP
North Jeolla Province	Wansan A, Jeonju	Lee Moo-young (Note: Lee Moo-young was removed on 11 December 2008, after his election was invalidated.)	Independent	Independent
North Jeolla Province	Wansan A, Jeonju	Shin Kuhn (Note: Shin Kuhn was by-elected on 29 April 2009, to succeed Lee Moo-young.)	Independent	Independent
North Jeolla Province	Wansan B, Jeonju	Jang Se-hwan	UDP	DUP
North Jeolla Province	Deokjin, Jeonju	Kim Se-ung (Note: Kim Se-ung was removed on 24 December 2008, after his election was invalidated.)	UDP	Democratic
North Jeolla Province	Deokjin, Jeonju	Chung Dong-young (Note: Chung Dong-young was by-elected on 29 April 2009, to succeed Kim Se-ung.)	Independent	DUP
North Jeolla Province	Gunsan	Kang Bong-kyun	UDP	Independent
North Jeolla Province	Iksan A	Lee Choon-suak	UDP	DUP
North Jeolla Province	Iksan B	Cho Bae-sook	UDP	Independent
North Jeolla Province	Jeongeup	You Sung-yop	Independent	Independent
North Jeolla Province	Namwon–Sunchang	Lee Kang-rae	UDP	DUP
North Jeolla Province	Gimje–Wanju	Choi Kyu-sung	UDP	DUP
North Jeolla Province	Jinan–Muju–Jangsu–Imsil	Chung Sye-kyun	UDP	DUP
North Jeolla Province	Gochang–Buan	Kim Choon-jin	UDP	DUP
South Jeolla Province	Mokpo	Park Jie-won	Independent	DUP
South Jeolla Province	Yeosu A	Kim Sung-gon	UDP	DUP
South Jeolla Province	Yeosu B	Joo Seung-yong	UDP	DUP
South Jeolla Province	Suncheon	Suh Gab-won (Note: Suh Gab-won was removed on 27 January 2011.)	UDP	Democratic
South Jeolla Province	Suncheon	Kim Sun-dong (Note: Kim Sun-dong was by-elected on 27 April 2011, to succeed Suh Gab-won.)	DLP	UPP
South Jeolla Province	Naju–Hwasun	Choi In-kee	UDP	Independent
South Jeolla Province	Gwangyang	Woo Yoon-keun	UDP	DUP
South Jeolla Province	Damyang–Gokseong–Gurye	Kim Hyo-seuk	UDP	DUP
South Jeolla Province	Goheung–Boseong	Park Sang-cheon	UDP	DUP
South Jeolla Province	Jangheung–Gangjin–Yeongam	Lew Seon-ho	UDP	DUP
South Jeolla Province	Haenam–Wando–Jindo	Kim Yung-rok	Independent	DUP
South Jeolla Province	Muan–Sinan	Lee Yoon-seok	Independent	DUP
South Jeolla Province	Hampyeong–Yeonggwang–Jangseong	Lee Nak-yon	UDP	DUP
North Gyeongsang Province	Buk, Pohang	Lee Byung-suk	GNP	Saenuri
North Gyeongsang Province	Nam, Pohang–Ulleung	Lee Sang-deuk	GNP	Saenuri
North Gyeongsang Province	Gyeongju	Kim Il-yun (Note: Kim Il-yun was removed on 24 December 2008, after his election was invalidated.)	Pro-Park	Independent
North Gyeongsang Province	Gyeongju	Jung Soo-sung (Note: Jung Soo-sung was by-elected on 29 April 2009, to succeed Kim Il-yun.)	Independent	Saenuri
North Gyeongsang Province	Gimcheon	Lee Cheol-woo	GNP	Saenuri
North Gyeongsang Province	Andong	Kim Gwang-lim	Independent	Saenuri
North Gyeongsang Province	Gumi A	Kim Seong-jo	GNP	Independent
North Gyeongsang Province	Gumi B	Kim Tae-whan	Independent	Saenuri
North Gyeongsang Province	Yeongju	Chang Yoon-seok	GNP	Saenuri
North Gyeongsang Province	Yeongcheon	Chung Hee-soo	GNP	Saenuri
North Gyeongsang Province	Sangju	Seong Youn-hwan	Independent	Independent
North Gyeongsang Province	Mungyeong–Yecheon	Lee Han-sung	GNP	Saenuri
North Gyeongsang Province	Gyeongsan–Cheongdo	Choi Kyung-hwan	GNP	Saenuri
North Gyeongsang Province	Goryeong–Seongju–Chilgok	Lee In-ki	Independent	Saenuri
North Gyeongsang Province	Gunwi–Uiseong–Cheongsong	Choung Hae-gul	Independent	Saenuri
North Gyeongsang Province	Yeongyang–Yeongdeok–Bonghwa–Uljin	Kang Seok-ho	GNP	Saenuri
South Gyeongsang Province	Changwon A	Kwon Kyung-seok	GNP	Saenuri
South Gyeongsang Province	Changwon B	Kwon Young-ghil	DLP	UPP
South Gyeongsang Province	Masan A	Lee Ju-young	GNP	Saenuri
South Gyeongsang Province	Masan B	Ahn Hong-joon	GNP	Saenuri
South Gyeongsang Province	Jinju A	Choi Gu-sik	Independent	Independent
South Gyeongsang Province	Jinju B	Kim Jae-kyung	GNP	Saenuri
South Gyeongsang Province	Jinhae	Kim Hak-song	GNP	Saenuri
South Gyeongsang Province	Tongyeong–Goseong	Lee Koon-hyon	GNP	Saenuri
South Gyeongsang Province	Sacheon	Kang Gi-gap	DLP	UPP
South Gyeongsang Province	Gimhae A	Kim Chung-kwon	GNP	Saenuri
South Gyeongsang Province	Gimhae B	Choi Chul-kook (Note: Choi Chul-kook was removed on 10 December 2010.)	UDP	Democratic
South Gyeongsang Province	Gimhae B	Kim Tae-ho (Note: Kim Tae-ho was by-elected on 27 April 2011, to succeed Choi Chul-kook.)	GNP	Saenuri
South Gyeongsang Province	Milyang–Changnyeong	Cho Hae-jin	GNP	Saenuri
South Gyeongsang Province	Geoje	Yoon Young	GNP	Saenuri
South Gyeongsang Province	Yangsan	Heo Beom-do (Note: Heo Beom-do was removed on 23 June 2009, after his election was invalidated.)	GNP	GNP
South Gyeongsang Province	Yangsan	Park Hee-tae (Note: Park Hee-tae was by-elected on 28 October 2009, to succeed Heo Beom-do.)	GNP	Saenuri
South Gyeongsang Province	Uiryeong–Haman–Hapcheon	Cho Jin-lae	GNP	Saenuri
South Gyeongsang Province	Namhae–Hadong	Yeo Sang-kyoo	GNP	Saenuri
South Gyeongsang Province	Sancheong–Hamyang–Geochang	Shin Sung-bum	GNP	Saenuri
Jeju Province	Jeju A	Kang Chang-il	UDP	DUP
Jeju Province	Jeju B	Kim Woo-nam	UDP	DUP
Jeju Province	Seogwipo	Kim Jae-yun	UDP	DUP
National	Proportional representation	Kang Myung-soon	GNP	Saenuri
National	Proportional representation	Lim Doo-sung (Note: Lim Doo-sung was removed on 9 September 2010, after his election was invalidated.)	GNP	GNP
National	Proportional representation	Bae Eun-hee	GNP	Saenuri
National	Proportional representation	Kang Sung-chun	GNP	Saenuri
National	Proportional representation	Lee Jeong-sun	GNP	Saenuri
National	Proportional representation	Kim Jang-soo	GNP	Saenuri
National	Proportional representation	Kim So-nam	GNP	Saenuri
National	Proportional representation	Chung Jin-suk (Note: Chung Jin-suk resigned on 16 July 2010, upon being appointed as Senior Presidential Secretary for Political Affairs.)	GNP	GNP
National	Proportional representation	Lee Eun-jae	GNP	Saenuri
National	Proportional representation	Lee Dal-gon (Note: Lee Dal-gon resigned on 3 March 2009, upon being appointed as Minister of Security and Public Administration.)	GNP	GNP
National	Proportional representation	Kim Kum-lae (Note: Kim Kum-lae resigned on 4 October 2011, upon being appointed as Minister of Gender Equality and Family.)	GNP	GNP
National	Proportional representation	Na Seong-lin	GNP	Saenuri
National	Proportional representation	Cho Yoon-sun	GNP	Saenuri
National	Proportional representation	Cho Moon-hwan	GNP	Saenuri
National	Proportional representation	Son Sook-mee	GNP	Saenuri
National	Proportional representation	Won Hee-mok	GNP	Saenuri
National	Proportional representation	Lee Ae-joo	GNP	Saenuri
National	Proportional representation	Lee Choon-sik	GNP	Saenuri
National	Proportional representation	Chung Ok-nim	GNP	Saenuri
National	Proportional representation	Lim Dong-kyu	GNP	Saenuri
National	Proportional representation	Kim Ok-lee	GNP	Saenuri
National	Proportional representation	Lee Jung-hyun	GNP	Saenuri
National	Proportional representation	Lee Doo-ah (Note: Lee Doo-ah took office on 3 March 2009, to succeed Lee Dal-gon.)	GNP	Saenuri
National	Proportional representation	Kim Sung-dong (Note: Kim Sung-dong took office on 16 July 2010, to succeed Chung Jin-suk.)	GNP	Saenuri
National	Proportional representation	Choi Kyung-hee (Note: Choi Kyung-hee took office on 9 September 2010, to succeed Lim Doo-sung.)	GNP	Saenuri
National	Proportional representation	Lee Young-yea (Note: Lee Young-yea took office on 4 October 2011, to succeed Kim Kum-lae.)	GNP	Saenuri
National	Proportional representation	Lee Sung-nam	UDP	DUP
National	Proportional representation	Park Eun-soo	UDP	DUP
National	Proportional representation	Choi Young-hee	UDP	DUP
National	Proportional representation	Song Min-soon	UDP	DUP
National	Proportional representation	Jeon Hae-sook	UDP	DUP
National	Proportional representation	Jeong Kuk-kyo (Note: Jeong Kuk-kyo was removed on 9 July 2009, after his election was invalidated.)	UDP	Democratic
National	Proportional representation	Jeon hyun-heui	UDP	DUP
National	Proportional representation	Seo Jong-pyo	UDP	DUP
National	Proportional representation	Shin Nak-yun	UDP	DUP
National	Proportional representation	Choi Moon-soon (Note: Choi Moon-soon resigned on 5 April 2011, to run in the 2011 Gangwon gubernatorial by-election.)	UDP	Democratic
National	Proportional representation	Kim Sang-hee	UDP	DUP
National	Proportional representation	Kim Choong-joh (Note: Kim Choong-joh was removed on 13 March 2012.)	UDP	DUP
National	Proportional representation	Park Sun-sook	UDP	DUP
National	Proportional representation	Ahn Gyu-baek	UDP	DUP
National	Proportional representation	Kim Yoo-jung	UDP	DUP
National	Proportional representation	Kim Jinai (Note: Kim Jinai took office on 3 November 2009, to succeed Jeong Kuk-kyo.)	Democratic (Note: Included in the United Democratic Party list in the 2008 election.)	DUP
National	Proportional representation	Kim Hak-jae (Note: Kim Hak-jae took office on 5 April 2011, to succeed Choi Moon-soon.)	Democratic	DUP
National	Proportional representation	Yang Jeong-lyea (Note: Yang Jeong-lyea was removed on 14 May 2009, after her election was invalidated.)	Pro-Park	Pro-Park
National	Proportional representation	Suh Chung-won (Note: Suh Chung-won was removed on 14 May 2009, after his election was invalidated.)	Pro-Park	Pro-Park
National	Proportional representation	Kim Noh-sik (Note: Kim Noh-sik was removed on 14 May 2009, after his election was invalidated.)	Pro-Park	Pro-Park
National	Proportional representation	Song Young-sun	Pro-Park	Saenuri
National	Proportional representation	Kim Eul-dong	Pro-Park	Saenuri
National	Proportional representation	Jeong Ha-gyun	Pro-Park	Saenuri
National	Proportional representation	Jung Young-hee	Pro-Park	Saenuri
National	Proportional representation	Roh Chul-rae	Pro-Park	Saenuri
National	Proportional representation	Kim Hye-seong (Note: Kim Hye-seong took office on 3 November 2009, to succeed Yang Jeong-lyea.)	Pro-Park	Saenuri
National	Proportional representation	Yoon Sang-il (Note: Yoon Sang-il took office on 3 November 2009, to succeed Suh Chung-won.)	Pro-Park	Saenuri
National	Proportional representation	Kim Chung (Note: Kim Chung took office on 3 November 2009, to succeed Kim Noh-sik.)	Pro-Park	Saenuri
National	Proportional representation	Lee Young A.	LFP	LFP
National	Proportional representation	Chough Soon-hyung	LFP	LFP
National	Proportional representation	Park Sun-young	LFP	LFP
National	Proportional representation	Kim Yong-gu	LFP	LFP
National	Proportional representation	Kwak Jung-sook	DLP	UPP
National	Proportional representation	Hong Hee-deok	DLP	UPP
National	Proportional representation	Lee Jung-hee	DLP	UPP
National	Proportional representation	Lee Yong-kyung	CKP	Independent
National	Proportional representation	Lee Han-jung (Note: Lee Han-jung was removed on 11 December 2008, after his election was invalidated.)	CKP	CKP
National	Proportional representation	Yu Won-il (Note: Yu Won-il took office on 11 December 2008, to succeed Lee Han-jung, but resigned on 25 January 2012.)	CKP	CKP
National	Proportional representation	Sun Kyung-sik (Note: Sun Kyung-sik took office on 25 January 2012, to succeed Yu Won-il.)	CKP	Independent
