= Kim Joon-kyo =

South Korean politician (born 1982)

- 김준교
- Born: 16 February 1982 (age 44); Seoul, South Korea
- Education: KAIST
- Occupations: Teacher, politician
- Political party: Future Korea

Korean name
- Hangul: 김준교
- RR: Gim Jungyo
- MR: Kim Chun'gyo

Kim Joon-kyo (Korean: 김준교, born 16 February 1982) is a South Korean teacher and politician. He was a former aide for Lee Hoi-chang in 2007 presidential election, as well as an MP candidate of the Party for Freedom and Advancement in 2008 election. He is now a member of the right-wing Future Korea Party.

== Education and early career ==
Born in Seoul, Kim was educated from Seoul Science High School and has a degree of industrial engineering from KAIST. He suffered a fibromyalgia, making him to get treatment for 10 years and be suspended from the national service. Following his graduation, Kim worked as a mathematics teacher in Daechi-dong, as well as writing some books and offering online lectures on YouTube. He has been operating an online tuition community on Naver.

== Political career ==
Kim was an online aid for Lee Hoi-chang, a sole independent candidate supported by the minor People First Party received 15.1% and came to 3rd in 2007 presidential election. He subsequently joined Party for Freedom and Advancement (PFA) formed by Lee and ran as the party's candidate for Gwangjin District 1st constituency in 2008 election but lost to Kwon Taek-ki of the ruling Grand National Party (then Liberty Korea Party). During this time, he promised to send all children of the district to Seoul National University.

In 2012 election, he switched to Yuseong District but defeated by Song Seok-chan during the PFA preselection. The party faced a huge defeat in the election, causing it to be merged into the ruling Saenuri Party (now Liberty Korea Party; LKP). He automatically became a member of the Saenuri, but did not active in politics till returned as an aid for Kim Moon-soo, the LKP candidate for Seoul mayorship in 2018 local elections.

Following the LKP's serious defeat in the local elections, its President Hong Joon-pyo stood his position down, led them to hold a snap leadership election in February 2019. Kim ran as a candidate for the Youth Chief but defeated by Shin Bo-ra. On 2 May, he shaved his hair along with the other LKP MPs as a part of protest boycotting the electoral reform of the ruling Democratic Party of Korea.

== Ideology ==
Kim mentioned that Koreans are the "greatest race in the earth", as well as urging the deportation of all illegal immigrants and Muslim refugees. While some newspapers describe his political views as far-right, he himself rejected the far-right label, adding that "the facts are now called as far-right hate speeches". He also holds a sceptical view towards centrism, citing that centrism is "unrealistic" and "impossible". He compared the centrist President Moon Jae-in to the far-left Venezuelan President Nicolás Maduro.

== Controversy ==
On 18 February 2019, Kim provoked a controversy while saying "What the hell is wrong with the President? I can't recognise the moron as our leader." during the LKP leadership election speech, which he targeted the President Moon Jae-in. The ruling Democratic Party criticised his remarks as "a disgusting hate speech full of barbaric McCarthyism". The Bareunmirae Party, a minor centre-right party, also accused that "it just shows the future of the visionless LKP".

== TV shows ==
- Couple (SBS, 2011) - as a Man No. 3

== Books ==
- Tuitions Are Fake (8 June 2010)
- Therefore We Are Studying, Notwithstanding We Are Studying (7 October 2010)
- Shortcuts of CSAT Mathematics (17 June 2011)
