= Yeo Sang-kyoo =

South Korean politician

- 여상규

Member of the National Assembly
- Incumbent
- Assumed office 30 May 2012
- Preceded by: Kang Ki-gap (Sacheon); Himself (as Namhae-Hadong)
- Constituency: Sacheon-Namhae-Hadong
- In office 30 May 2008 – 29 May 2012
- Preceded by: Park Hui-tae
- Succeeded by: Himself (as Sacheon-Namhae-Hadong)
- Constituency: Namhae-Hadong

Personal details
- Born: 15 September 1948 (age 78) Hadong, South Gyeongsang, South Korea
- Party: Liberty Korea
- Other political affiliations: Grand National Party (2008–2012); Saenuri Party (2012–2016); Bareun Party (2017)
- Spouse: Park Hyun-sook
- Children: Yeo Jung-suk
- Education: Seoul National University
- Occupation: Judge, lawyer, politician

Yeo Sang-kyoo (Korean: 여상규, born 15 September 1948) is a South Korean judge, lawyer and politician. He is the incumbent Member of National Assembly for Sacheon-Namhae-Hadong, as well as the Chairman of the Legislation and Judiciary Committee.

== Early life and career ==
Born in Hadong, Yeo was educated at Akyang Primary School, Akyang Secondary School, and Kyungnam High School. He earned a bachelor's degree in law from Seoul National University. After the graduation, he passed the judicial examination in 1978, and was appointed as a judge of the Seoul Central District Court in 1980. In 1990, he switched to the Seoul High Court and worked there for 3 years.

Yeo is also the incumbent director of the Bang Il-young Cultural Foundation since 1993.

== Political career ==
After working at several organisations, Yeo was brought to the Grand National Party (GNP), prior to the 2008 election. He was selected as an MP candidate for Namhae-Hadong, replacing the incumbent Park Hui-tae. He defeated Kim Doo-kwan (Independent) and Kim Yoon-gon (FPPU).

In 2012 election, Yeo ran for newly created Sacheon-Namhae-Hadong constituency, and won the election. Few months after the re-election in 2016, he left Saenuri Party (Liberty Korea Party since February 2017) and joined Bareun Party. However, he returned to Liberty Korea Party on 2 May 2017 and endorsed Hong Joon-pyo for the upcoming presidential election.

== Controversies ==
On 27 January 2018, Unanswered Questions of SBS reported that Suk Dal-yoon was convicted of letting spy in 1981, where Yeo was the judge in charge. In the programme, Suk's son, Suk Kwon-ho, explained that his father was tortured by the Korean Central Intelligence Agency, such as putting a ballpoint pen refill into his penis. Following are the telephone conversation between Yeo and the programme emcee.

MC: He was illegally detained for 47 days, and also tortured.

Yeo: There's no such evidences. And why are you asking about it now? Bye, I have nothing much to say.
MC: Sir, your decision ruined a person's life.
Yeo: What?
MC: Don't you wanna say sorry to him? It's true that you sentenced life imprisonment...

Yeo: Forget it, you little shit.

Following his reaction, several Democratic MPs including Sohn Hye-won, Jin Sun-mee and Jung Chung-rae condemned him. Jin called his reaction as "disgusting", whereas Jung criticised him as "disrespectful". Kwon Sung-joo, the spokesperson of the Bareun Party, urged him to apologise.

== Election results ==
=== General elections ===
Year	Constituency	Political party	Votes (%)	Remarks
2008	Namhae-Hadong	GNP	34,874 (56.73%)	Won
2012	Sacheon-Namhae-Hadong	SP	57,840 (50.30%)	Won
2016	Sacheon-Namhae-Hadong	SP	59,717 (54.83%)	Won
