= Song Ok-joo =

South Korean politician (born 1965)

- 송옥주

Member of the National Assembly
- Incumbent
- Assumed office 30 May 2020
- Preceded by: Suh Chung-won
- Constituency: Gyeonggi Hwaseong A
- In office 30 May 2016 – 29 May 2020
- Constituency: Proportional representation

Personal details
- Born: 20 December 1965 (age 60) Ujeong-eup, Hwaseong, Gyeonggi-do, South Korea
- Party: Democratic
- Education: Yonsei University

Song Ok-joo (Korean: 송옥주; Hanja: 宋玉珠; born 20 December 1965) is a South Korean politician and two-term parliamentarian currently representing Hwaseong at the National Assembly.

From 1996 to 2016 Song had worked for her party and its preceding parties in areas of policy coordination, public relations and education. From 2011 to 2012 she was a policy researcher at the National Assembly upon the nomination of her party. In the 2012 general election, she was placed as the number 31 on the proportional representation list of her party. In the 2016 general election, she was placed as the number 3 on the list.

After becoming a parliamentarian in 2016, she took multiple roles in her party such as its spokesperson, deputy floor leader and deputy chair of Policy Planning Committee.

In the 2020 general election, she won the constituency which was previously represented by a senior opposition figure and eight-term parliamentarian, Suh Chung-won, and only taken by opposition parties ever since it was created in 2008.

In 2020 she was elected as the chair of National Assembly's Environment and Labor Committee responsible for scrutinising Ministry of Environment, Ministry of Employment and Labor and related agencies.

Song holds two degrees from Yonsei University - a bachelor in communication and a master's in administration.

== Electoral history ==
Election	Year	District	Party affiliation	Votes	Percentage of votes	Results
18th National Assembly General Election	2008	Gyeonggi Hwaseong A	United Democratic Party	14,107	25.31%	Lost (2nd)
19th National Assembly General Election	2012	Proportional representation (31st)	Democratic United Party	7,777,123	36.45%	Not Elected
20th National Assembly General Election	2016	Proportional representation (3rd)	Democratic Party	6,069,744	25.54%	Elected
21st National Assembly General Election	2020	Gyeonggi Hwaseong A	Democratic Party	58,689	49.65%	Won
22nd National Assembly General Election	2024	Gyeonggi Hwaseong A	Democratic Party	75,916	55.88%	Won
