= Gong Sung-jin =

South Korean politician (born 1953)

- Hangul: 공성진
- Hanja: 孔星鎭
- RR: Gong Seongjin
- MR: Kong Sŏngjin

Gong Sung-jin (Korean: 공성진; born April 20, 1953) is a South Korean politician. He is a member of the Grand National Party (also known as the Hannara Party) in South Korea, representing the Gangnam District B of Seoul. He was born in Seoul on April 20, 1953.

== Education ==
After graduating from Kyunggi High School in Seoul, he attended Yonsei University with a major in political science. He continued his education at Claremont Graduate University, California in the United States and received his master's degree and PhD in 1986.

== Career ==
Gong Sung-Jin was elected from Gangnam District of Seoul at 2004, in the 17th General election. As a legislative career, he has worked in the Environment & Labor Committee, the National Defense Committee, the Intelligence Committee, and the Committee for Peaceful Reunification. He has held various posts in the Grand National Party as the chairman of the 1st Policy Coordination Committee, joint chairman of the National Development Strategy Research and so on. In the 17th presidential election, Gong served as chairman of the election campaign committee in Seoul. Later he was appointed as chairman of the GNP Seoul Branch in September 2007.

At the presidential election in December 2007, he decisively contributed to candidate Lee Myung-bak's victory as the director-general of the Grand National Party presidential election campaign office in Seoul. He was reelected at the general election on April 9, 2008, and was elected as a Supreme Committee Member of the Grand National Party on July 3, 2008. He is now working as member of the National Policy Committee of the National Assembly and one of the most prominent politicians of the ruling Grand National Party.

- 1992 – 2004. President of Hanbek Foundation
- 1999 – 2001. Served as a member of Millennium Committee of JoongAng Ilbo
- 1999 – 2000. Served as advisor for Future Talks 2000 of Educational Broadcasting System (EBS)
- 1997 – 1999. Served as visiting scholar at Claremont McKenna College for "The Keck Center for International and Strategic Studies"
- 1997 – 1999. Served as columnist of Korea Broadcasting System.
- 1999. Served as advisor of a coordinating committee for Expo 2012
- 1995 – 1998. Served as advisor on the Reunification Issue for Munhwa Broadcasting Corporation
- 1989 – 1997. Served as chief editor & publisher for a quarterly magazine, the Forum 21
- 1989 – 1992. Served as an executive Member of Korean Political Science Association
  - of Korean association for Public Administration
  - of Korean Society of Phenomenology
  - of Korean Society of Futurology

== Election results ==
Year	Elections	Constituency	Political party	Votes (%)	Results
2004	17th National Assembly General Election	Gangnam B (Seoul)	GNP	70,831 (57.50%)	Won
2008	18th National Assembly General Election	Gangnam B (Seoul)	GNP	57,721 (62.69%)	Won

== Books ==
- The Future of Korea and the World (1991)
- 21st Century Korea and Korean (1993)
- Sense of Wholeness and Human Rights (1993)
- Foreseen Unified Koreas (1994)
- The Politics of Korea (1995)
- Dreams with Open Eyes (1996)
- Future Challenges of Local Autonomy in Japan, Korea and the United States (1997)
- Changing World, Changing Occupations (2000)
- Security Strategy of Korea. 2008–2013 (2008)
