= Future Hope Alliance =

2008–2012 political party in South Korea

Future Hope Alliance 미래희망연대
- Leader: Rho Cheolrae
- Assembly leader: Rho Cheolrae
- Founded: March 21, 2008
- Dissolved: February 2, 2012
- Split from: Grand National Party
- Merged into: Saenuri Party
- Headquarters: Yeouido-dong, Yeongdeungpo-gu, Seoul
- Ideology: Conservatism; Pro-Park Geun-Hye
- Colors: Blue (Note: as Future Hope Alliance); Dark blue (Note: as Pro-Park Alliance)

Website
- gokorea.org

- Future Hope Alliance
- Hangul: 미래희망연대
- Hanja: 未來希望連帶
- RR: Mirae huimang yeondae
- MR: Mirae hŭimang yŏndae

The Future Hope Alliance (Korean: 미래희망연대) was a conservative political party in South Korea. Assembly members who supported Park Geun-hye in her failed bid for the Grand National Party (GNP) nomination for 2007 presidential election, initially called the Pro-Park Alliance (친박연대; 親朴連帶; Chinbak yeondae), established the new party on 21 March 2008.

On 2 April 2010, the party announced that it would rejoin the GNP. On 2 February 2012, the party dissolved and merged into the GNP, which was then renamed the Saenuri Party.

== Electoral results ==
=== Legislature ===
Election	Leader	Constituency			Party list			Seats	Position	Status
Election	Leader	Votes	%	Seats	Votes	%	Seats	Seats	Position	Status
2008	Suh Chung-won	637,351	3.70	8 / 245	2,258,750	13.18	6 / 54	14 / 299	3rd	Opposition

=== Local ===
Election	Leader	Metropolitan mayor/Governor	Provincial legislature	Municipal mayor	Municipal legislature
2010	Suh Chung-won	0 / 16	3 / 761	0 / 228	19 / 2,888

== Gallery ==
Pro-Park Alliance
