= Lee Hahn-koo =

South Korean politician

- Hangul: 이한구
- Hanja: 李漢久
- RR: I Hangu
- MR: I Han'gu

Lee Hahn-koo (Korean: 이한구; born 12 December 1945) is a South Korean politician and the former parliamentary leader of the Saenuri Party.

== Biography ==
He studied at Seoul National University and completed a doctoral degree in economics at Kansas State University before serving the South Korean Ministry of Finance as a civil servant. He is now serving his fourth term in the Assembly, having been elected as a proportional representation candidate in 2000 before becoming member for Suseong-gap in Daegu in 2004.

A former economist, Lee was previously an economic adviser and chief of staff to Park Geun-hye, and in the 2012 parliamentary elections he campaigned on the slogan "Make Park Geun-hye the next president".

== Election results ==
Year	Elections	Constituency	Political party	Votes (%)	Results
2000	16th National Assembly General Election	Proportional representation (12nd)	GNP	7,365,359 (38.96%)	Elected
2004	17th National Assembly General Election	Suseong A (Daegu)	GNP	65,098 (60.33%)	Won
2008	18th National Assembly General Election	Suseong A (Daegu)	GNP	66,652 (78.40%)	Won
2012	19th National Assembly General Election	Suseong A (Daegu)	Saenuri	60,588 (52.77%)	Won

National Assembly of the Republic of Korea
Preceded by Kim Man-je	Member of the National Assembly for Daegu Suseong-gap; 2004–2016	Succeeded by Kim Boo-kyum
