= Ahn Sang-soo (Changwon mayor) =

South Korean politician (born February 1946)

Mayor of Changwon
- In office 1 July 2014 – 30 June 2018
- Preceded by: Park Wan-su
- Succeeded by: Heo Seong-moo

Chairman of the Grand National Party
- In office 14 July 2010 – 8 May 2011
- Preceded by: Chung Mong-joon; Kim Moo-sung (Interim)
- Succeeded by: Chung Ui-hwa (Interim); Hong Joon-pyo

Member of the National Assembly
- In office 30 May 1996 – 29 May 2012
- Preceded by: Park Je-sang
- Succeeded by: Song Ho-chang
- Constituency: Gwacheon–Uiwang (Gyeonggi, 1996-2004); Uiwang–Gwacheon (Gyeonggi, 2004-2012)

Personal details
- Born: 9 February 1946 (age 80) Changwon, South Gyeongsang Province, southern Korea
- Party: People Power
- Education: Masan High School; Seoul National University School of Law (LL.B.)
- Profession: Politician, Prosecutor

Korean name
- Hangul: 안상수
- Hanja: 安商守
- RR: An Sangsu
- MR: An Sangsu

Ahn Sang-soo (Korean: 안상수; born February 9, 1946, in Changwon) is a South Korean politician. He was chairman of the Grand National Party, the precursor to the Saenuri Party. He was the Mayor of Changwon from 2014 to 2018. He hopes to improve that city's bicycle-sharing plan.

== Controversies ==
He mistook thermos flasks as North Korean artillery shells in a bombed-out house afflicted after the Bombardment of Yeonpyeong. This has stirred controversies in the National Assembly of South Korea.

== Election results ==
=== General elections ===
| Year | Elections | Constituency | Political party | Votes (%) | Results |
|---|---|---|---|---|---|
| 1996 | 15th National Assembly General Election | Gwacheon–Uiwang (Gyeonggi) | NKP | 25,844 (33.80%) | Won |
| 2000 | 16th National Assembly General Election | Gwacheon–Uiwang (Gyeonggi) | GNP | 37,491 (48.56%) | Won |
| 2004 | 17th National Assembly General Election | Uiwang–Gwacheon (Gyeonggi) | GNP | 48,194 (49.12%) | Won |
| 2008 | 18th National Assembly General Election | Uiwang–Gwacheon (Gyeonggi) | GNP | 42,580 (60.40%) | Won |

=== Local elections ===
==== Mayor of Changwon ====
| Year | Elections | Constituency | Political party | Votes (%) | Remarks |
|---|---|---|---|---|---|
| 2014 | 6th Iocal Election | Mayor of Changwon | Saenuri | 274,468 (56.50%) | Won |
| 2018 | 7th Iocal Election | Mayor of Changwon | Independent | 84,984 (15.33%) | Defeated (3rd) |
