= Moon Kook-hyun =

South Korean politician (born 1949)

- 문국현

Leader of the Creative Korea Party
- In office October 14, 2007 – November 4, 2009

Member of the National Assembly
- In office May 30, 2008 – October 22, 2009
- Preceded by: Lee Jae-oh (GNP)
- Succeeded by: Lee Jae-oh
- Constituency: Eunpyeong B (Seoul)

Personal details
- Born: January 12, 1949 (age 77) Seoul, South Korea
- Party: Independent
- Other political affiliations: Creative Korea Party (2007–2012)
- Spouse: Park Su-ae
- Children: 2 daughters

Korean name
- Hangul: 문국현
- Hanja: 文國現
- RR: Mun Gukhyeon
- MR: Mun Kukhyŏn

Moon Kook-hyun (Korean: 문국현, born 12 January 1949) is a South Korean politician who served as the leader of the Creative Korea Party. Before entering politics, he was a well-known business manager and civil environmental campaigner in South Korea.

Born in Seoul, Moon studied English language at the Hankuk University of Foreign Studies, graduating with a BA in 1972, then took a postgraduate course in Business Administration at the Seoul National University.

== Business career ==
Moon began his career at Yuhan-Kimberly, a company manufacturing paper and woven fibre products. In 1983, he spent a year in the United States, taking some new management concepts. On his return, he developed the concept of "environmental management", focusing on digital printing technologies and the use of recycled paper.

In 1995, Moon became chief executive officer of Yuhan-Kimberly. In 1996, Moon was appointed committee director of the U.N. Environment (UNEP) Korea Development Organization. Faced with a financial crisis in 1997, he developed a new shift system where workers worked twelve-hours shifts for four days running, then took four days off.

== 2007 presidential election ==
In August 2007, Moon resigned from Yuhan-Kimberly to run in the 2007 South Korean presidential election. In October, he formed the Creative Korea Party, with an anti-corruption, pro-environmentalist program, gaining a bit of support from liberal voters who supported the Participatory Government, conservative voters who wanted to change the government and liked a similar 'business leader' portfolio but disliked Lee Myung-bak, and from the labor movement.

In the election, Moon won 5.8% of the votes for fourth place. Moon is a Roman Catholic.

== 2008 legislative election ==
On April 9, 2008, Moon beat the close confidante of Lee Myung-bak (president) Lee Jae-oh (GNP, Incumbent), by more than 11%. Although the harsh loss of South Korean liberal candidates especially in Seoul at this 2008 election, his campaign against 'the Grand Korean Canal' project boosted his popularity in his electoral division and across the nation. However, he lost his seat after a year (2009.10.22) due to his party members gaining profit illegally by confidential information. The court sentenced him 8 months. In the 2010 re-election for his empty seat, Lee Jae-oh easily regained his seat by 58.33%.

== Election results ==
Year	Elections	Constituency	Political party	Votes (%)	Results
2007	2007 Presidential Election	South Korea	CKP	1,375,498 (5.83%)	Defeated (4th)
2008	18th National Assembly General Election	Eunpyeong B (Seoul)	CKP	48,656 (52.02%)	Won
