= Family Party for Peace and Unity =

2003–2007 and 2007–2008 political party in South Korea

- Leader: Kwak Jeong-hwan
- Founded: 10 March 2003 (Universal Peace and Unification Family Party); 28 August 2007 (Family Party for Peace and Unity)
- Dissolved: 29 March 2007 (Universal Peace and Unification Family Party); 15 April 2008 (Family Party for Peace and Unity)
- Preceded by: Universal Peace and Unification Family Party
- Ideology: Unification Church
- Religion: Unification Church
- Colors: Light Green

Korean name
- Hangul: 평화통일가정당
- Hanja: 平和統一家庭堂
- RR: Pyeonghwa tongil gajeongdang
- MR: P'yŏnghwa t'ongil kajŏngdang

Universal Peace and Unification Family Party
- Hangul: 천주평화통일가정당
- Hanja: 天宙平和統一家庭堂
- RR: Cheonju pyeonghwa tongil gajeongdang
- MR: Ch'ŏnju p'yŏnghwa t'ongil kajŏngdang

The Family Party for Peace and Unity (Korean: 평화통일가정당) was a political party based on the ideology of the Unification Church in South Korea. The party is a re-founded version of the Universal Peace and Unification Family Party (Korean: 천주평화통일가정당) which was dissolved on the 29 March 2007.

== Universal Peace and Unification Family Party ==
The party uses the Hanja character for "house" (堂) instead of the character for "party" (黨). The Universal Peace and Unification Family Party was founded on 10 March 2003 by Sun Myung Moon and Hak Ja Han. The party promoted "True Family," "Purity Values," and "National Ideological Education." The party stated it would focus on national education without participating in elections. However, it was revoked by the National Election Commission on 29 March 2007, as it met the grounds for revocation of party registration under the Political Parties Act Article 44(1).

== Family Party for Peace and Unity ==
The Family Party for Peace and Unity was re-established from the Universal Peace and Unification Family Party on 28 August 2007, under the slogan “Only when the family stands upright does the country stand upright.” The party president was Kwak Jeong-hwan, and the central party headquarters was located on the 5th floor of the Dowon Building in Dohwa 2-dong, Mapo-gu, Seoul. However, following the 2008 South Korean legislative election, it met the grounds for cancellation of party registration under the Political Parties Act, having failed to receive more than 2% vote share, and its party registration was revoked as of 15 April 2008.

== Election results ==
Year	Election	National Assembly seats contested	Elected representatives (constituency/proportional)	Votes
2008	18th general election	299	0	1.1%

== Logos ==
Logo of the Universal Peace and Unification Family Party

Logo of the Family Party for Peace and Unity
