= Creative Korea Party =

2007–2012 political party in South Korea

Creative Korea Party 창조한국당
- Leader: Han Myeon-hee
- Founded: 7 November 2007
- Dissolved: 12 April 2012
- Split from: Grand Unified Democratic New Party
- Headquarters: 28-130 Yeongdeungpo-2 dong, Yeongdeungpo-gu, Seoul
- Ideology: Centrist reformism
- Political position: Centre
- National affiliation: Advancement and Creation Association (2008–2009)
- Colours: Red

Website
- ckp.kr archived

Korean name
- Hangul: 창조한국당
- Hanja: 創造韓國黨
- RR: Changjo Hangukdang
- MR: Ch'angjo Han'guktang

Creative Korea Party (CKP; Korean: 창조한국당) was a political party of South Korea. It was formed out of the Uri Party and its resulting civil splinter groups, with their leader Moon Kook-hyun, a well-known former business leader who recently started his political career. Their 2007 presidential bid was unsuccessful, however, they gained 3 seats at the 2008 general election on April 9, 2008, including the election of Moon Kook-hyun at Eunpyeong-eul, Seoul district; but lost all of these seats in the subsequent 2012 general election. Creative Korea Party deregistered on 26 April 2012.

== Party platform ==
- Creating a new Social Solidarity
- Establishing a Knowledge and Creativity-based Economy
- Minimizing military tension of Korean Peninsula
- Providing 'Productive Welfare'
- Building a sustainable Social development
- Funding a Substantial Public and Lifelong Education
- Respecting Minority Rights
- Taking responsibility of the Diversity of Cultural References
- Creating Economic Cooperation in Northeast Asia

== Notable members ==
- Moon Kook-hyun MP, Party Leader, Official Presidential candidate of the party and MP for Eunpyeong-gu 2nd electorate, Seoul
- Lee Yong-kyeong MP, former CEO of KT and Korean National Assembly MP
- Yu Won-il MP, former environmental movement organizer in Siheung, Gyeonggi Province, and Korean National Assembly MP
- Lee Jeong-ja, Chairperson of Green-consumer Network (Civil organization)

== 2007 Election ==
They held their nominating convention for 2007 presidential election on November 4, 2007. During that event, its leader Moon Kook-hyun was elected with 8,884(94.9%) of the mobile phone vote. As one of the pro-governmental liberal candidates, he and his party suffered the pressure of political simplification from several civil organizational leaders for the entire campaigning period. However, although negotiating with the UNDP politicians a lot, he eventually decided to target voters disappointed with both major parties (the UNDP and GNP) and their candidates(Chung Dong-young and Lee Myung-bak). They hoped to reach somewhat over 10% support, but gained a final result of 1.38 million voters(5.82%) which put them in 4th place. However, they earned more votes than the 10-year-old KDLP's result(3.00%), and gained strong supports (Its average was roughly 8%) from metropolitan city areas, such as Seoul and its suburbs, Incheon, Daejeon, Chuncheon, Jeju, therefore it was judged to be a potential threat to major parties during the 2008 parliamentary election.

== 2012 election ==
In the 2012 general election, the party received less than .1% of the constituency votes, and .4% of the national votes for proportional representation. It lost all three seats in the parliament. The party was dissolved as a result (The party needs to obtain at least 2% of the national votes in order for it to remain registered).

== Electoral results ==
=== President ===
Election	Candidate	Votes	%	Result
2007	Moon Kook-hyun	1,375,498	5.83	Not elected

=== Legislature ===
Election	Leader	Constituency				Party list				Seats		Position	Status
Election	Leader	Votes	%	Seats	+/-	Votes	%	Seats	+/-	No.	+/–	Position	Status
2008	Han Myeon-hee	72,803	0.42	1 / 245	new	651,993	3.81	2 / 54	new	3 / 299	new	6th	Opposition
2012	Han Myeon-hee	3,624	0.02	0 / 246	▼1	91,935	0.43	0 / 54	▼2	0 / 300	▼2	11th	Extra-parliamentary

== See also ==
- Politics of South Korea
- Lists of political parties
