= Kwon Young-ghil =

South Korean politician (born 1941)

- 권영길
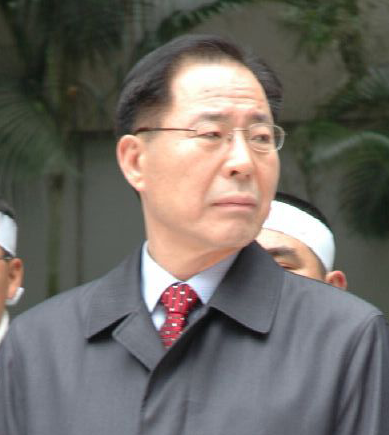

Chairman of the Democratic Labor Party
- In office 30 January 2000 – 12 July 2004
- Preceded by: Party Established
- Succeeded by: Kim Hae-kyung

Member of the National Assembly
- In office 30 May 2004 – 29 May 2012
- Preceded by: Lee Ju-yeong
- Succeeded by: Kang Ki-youn
- Constituency: Seongsan District (Changwon)

Personal details
- Born: 5 November 1941 (age 85) Yamaguchi Prefecture, Empire of Japan
- Party: Justice Party
- Other political affiliations: People's Victory 21 (1997–2000); Democratic Labor Party (2000–11); Unified Progressive Party (2011–12)
- Spouse: Kang Jie-yeun
- Education: Seoul National University
- Religion: Roman Catholic(Christian Name : Charles)

Korean name
- Hangul: 권영길
- Hanja: 權永吉
- RR: Gwon Yeonggil
- MR: Kwŏn Yŏnggil

Kwon Young-ghil (Korean: 권영길; born 5 November 1941) is a South Korean politician, journalist, and trade unionist. He was a founding member of the People's Victory 21 and Democratic Labour Party.

== Life ==
Kwon was born in Japan, before returning to Korea. His father Kwon Wu-hyun(권우현) was a member of left-wing nationalists movements. In Kwon's early years worked at Daehan Ilbo (대한일보; 大韓日報) and Seoul Shinmun as a journalist and newsman. From 1980 to 1987, he was a Seoul Shinmun correspondent in Paris, France.

He has a Bachelor's degree in sericulture from Seoul National University (1969). Before turning to politics, he led several labour organizations including Korean Federation of Press Unions and Korean Confederation of Trade Unions. In 1996 and 1997 he was Chairman of the Korean Confederation of Trade Unions (KCTU, 전국민주노동조합총연맹; 全國民主勞動組合總聯盟).

He was the President of left-wing Democratic Labour Party, and was a member of the 17th and 18th National Assembly. Kwon is a Roman Catholic. In 2000 to 2004 he was the head of the Democratic Labour Party. He was the party's presidential nominee in the 2002 and 2007 presidential election. After losing his bid for the governorship of the South Gyeongsang Province in 2012, and in the midst of the political scandal in the broader progressive movement in South Korea, Kwon declared his intention to retire from the frontline party politics.

Since 2013, Kwon has been a president of "Kwon Young-gil and a Better Livelihood" (권영길과 나아지는 살림살이), a think-tank that promotes and supports various progressive causes. Kwon urged people to vote for the Justice Party in the 2016 South Korean legislative election, and actively supported Sim Sang-jung's candidacy in the 2017 South Korean presidential election.

== See also ==
- Democratic Labor Party (South Korea)
- Politics of South Korea

== Election results ==
| Year | Elections | Constituency | Political party | Votes (%) | Results |
|---|---|---|---|---|---|
| 1997 | 1997 Presidential Election | South Korea | Construction National Victory 21 | 306,026 (1.20%) | Defeated (4th) |
| 2000 | 16th National Assembly General Election | Changwon B (South Gyeongsang) | DLP | 36,579 (38.68%) | Defeated (2nd) |
| 2002 | 2002 Presidential Election | South Korea | DLP | 957,148 (3.89%) | Defeated (3rd) |
| 2004 | 17th National Assembly General Election | Changwon B (South Gyeongsang) | DLP | 52,758 (49.80%) | Won |
| 2007 | 2007 Presidential Election | South Korea | DLP | 712,121 (3.01%) | Defeated (5th) |
| 2008 | 18th National Assembly General Election | Changwon B (South Gyeongsang) | DLP | 42,809 (48.19%) | Won |
| 2012 | 2012 By-election | South Gyeongsang (Governoral Elections) | Independent | 702,689 (37.08%) | Defeated (2nd) |
