= Kang Jae-sup =

South Korean politician (born 1948)

- 강재섭
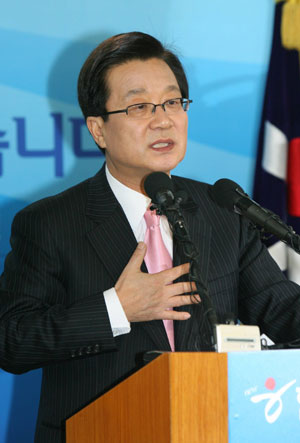
- Kang in 2008

Chairman of the Grand National Party
- In office 11 July 2006 – 3 July 2008
- Preceded by: Park Geun-hye; Kim Yeong-seon (Acting)
- Succeeded by: Park Hee-tae

Member of the National Assembly
- In office 30 May 1992 – 29 May 2008
- Preceded by: Choi Woon-ji
- Succeeded by: Hong Sa-deok
- Constituency: Seo B (Daegu, 1992-2000); Seo (Daegu, 2000-2008)
- In office 30 May 1988 – 29 May 1992
- Constituency: Proportional representation

Personal details
- Born: 28 March 1948 (age 78) Uiseong, North Gyeongsang Province
- Party: People Power

Korean name
- Hangul: 강재섭
- Hanja: 姜在涉
- RR: Gang Jaeseop
- MR: Kang Chaesŏp

Kang Jae-sup (강재섭; born 28 March 1948) is a South Korean politician and former leader of Grand National Party since 11 July 2006. He was first been elected in 1988.

He was born in Uiseong, North Gyeongsang Province, South Korea.

== Election results ==
Year	Elections	Constituency	Political party	Votes (%)	Results
1988	13th National Assembly General Election	National (32nd)	DJP	6,670,494 (33.96%)	Elected
1992	14th National Assembly General Election	Seo B (Daegu)	DLP	44,117 (55.78%)	Won
1996	16th National Assembly General Election	Seo B (Daegu)	NKP	20,950 (32.56%)	Won
2000	16th National Assembly General Election	Seo (Daegu)	GNP	65,810 (62.03%)	Won
2004	17th National Assembly General Election	Seo (Daegu)	GNP	62,392 (56.12%)	Won
2011	2011 By-election	Seongnam Bundang B (Gyeonggi)	GNP	39,382 (48.31%)	Defeated (2nd)
