= Suh Chung-won =

South Korean politician (born 1943)

- 서청원
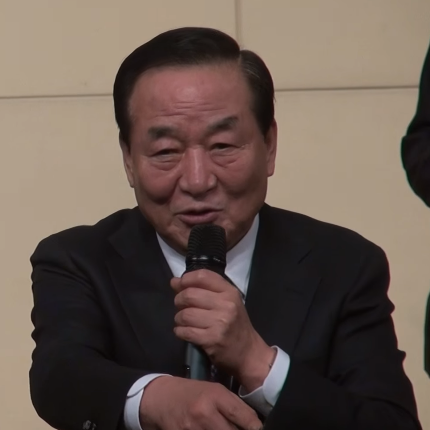

Member of the National Assembly
- In office 30 May 2016 – 29 May 2020
- Succeeded by: Song Ok-joo
- Constituency: Hwaseong A (Gyeonggi)
- In office 30 October 2013 – 29 May 2016
- Preceded by: Go Hui-seon
- Constituency: Hwaseong A (Gyeonggi)
- In office 30 May 2000 – 29 May 2004
- Succeeded by: Jun Byung-hun
- Constituency: Dongjak A (Seoul)
- In office 30 May 1996 – 29 May 2000
- Constituency: Dongjak A (Seoul)
- In office 30 May 1992 – 29 May 1996
- Constituency: Dongjak A (Seoul)
- In office 30 May 1988 – 29 May 1992
- Preceded by: Park Sil, Heo Chung-il
- Constituency: Dongjak A (Seoul)
- In office 30 May 1981 – 29 May 1985
- Preceded by: Jeong Hee-sup, Kim Soo-han
- Succeeded by: Park Sil, Heo Chung-il
- Constituency: Seoul 11th (Dongjak)

Floor Leader of the Our Republican Party
- In office 21 March 2020 – 29 May 2020
- Preceded by: Position established

Leader of the Future Hope Alliance
- In office 31 March 2010 – 2 February 2012
- Preceded by: (Served with Lee Gyu-taek until 30 March 2010)
- Succeeded by: Position abolished

Floor Leader of the New Korea Party
- In office 1996–1997
- Preceded by: Seo Jung-hwa
- Succeeded by: Park Hee-tae

Personal details
- Born: April 3, 1943 (age 83) Ipjang-myeon, Cheonwon-gun, Korea, Empire of Japan
- Party: People Power
- Spouse: Lee Seon-hwa (m. 1969)
- Children: 2
- Education: Chungang University

Korean name
- Hangul: 서청원
- Hanja: 徐淸源
- RR: Seo Cheongwon
- MR: Sŏ Ch'ŏngwŏn

Suh Chung-won (Korean: 서청원; Hanja: 徐淸源; born 3 April 1943) is a South Korean politician who served as a member of the National Assembly for eight terms (1981–1985, 1988–2004, 2013–2020). He also served as floor leader of the Our Republican Party. Suh had been in the National Assembly for 32 years, being the second most long serving member.

== Early life and education ==
Suh was born in Chūseinan Province (South Chungcheong Province), Korea, Empire of Japan on April 3, 1943. He graduated from Chungang University with a degree in political science. He actively took part in the June 3 Resistance Movement in 1964. He served in South Korea's mandatory military conscription from December 1966 to October 1969; he served for 34 months in the South Korean military. After serving his time in the military, Suh worked as a reporter for the Chosun Ilbo until 1980. During his time as a reporter, he reported from the front lines of the Gwangju Uprising in 1980.

== Political career ==
=== Representative of Dongjak District (1981–2004) ===
Suh ran for the Seoul 11th electoral district (now Dongjak District A) as a member of the Democratic Korea Party in the 1981 South Korean legislative election. He was elected along with Cho Jong-ho of the ruling Democratic Justice Party. He ran for the same electoral district in 1985, however he wasn't elected.

Suh ran for the Dongjak District A electoral district as a member of the Reunification Democratic Party in 1988 and was elected. Since his election in 1988, Suh continuously won until 2004. He was ineligible to participate in the 2004 South Korean legislative election and 2008 South Korean legislative election due to him receiving illegal funds for his campaign previously.

=== Alignment with Park Geun-hye (2007–present) ===
He supported Park Geun-hye becoming the presidential nominee of the Grand National Party national convention in 2007, however Lee Myung-bak was nominated. As a result, Suh created the Future Hope Alliance; a solely pro-Park Geun-hye party in 2010 as his relations with pro-Lee Myung-bak members of the Grand National Party deteriorated.

Later, the Future Hope Alliance was absorbed back into the Saenuri Party (formerly Grand National Party) in 2012.

Suh ran for the Hwaseong A electoral district during by-elections in 2013 and was elected. Suh served as acting Speaker of the National Assembly until Chung Sye-kyun was elected to the position.

After the impeachment of Park Geun-hye in 2017, he remained pro-Park Geun-hye which made him unpopular with the anti-Park Geun-hye faction of Saenuri Party. He regularly participates in pro-Park rallies along with Cho Won-jin.

He joined the Liberty Republican Party on March 21, 2020 and became the Floor Leader of the party. He plans to run in the upcoming 2020 South Korean legislative election.

== Personal life ==
Suh married his wife Lee Seon-hwa in 1969. Together they have a son and a daughter.

== Election results ==
| Year | Elections | Constituency | Political party | Votes (%) | Results |
|---|---|---|---|---|---|
| 1981 | 11th National Assembly General Election | Dongjak (Seoul) | DKP | 45,207 (27.16%) | Won |
| 1985 | 12th National Assembly General Election | Dongjak (Seoul) | DKP | 41,623 (19.69%) | Defeated (3rd) |
| 1988 | 13th National Assembly General Election | Dongjak A (Seoul) | RDP | 37,270 (39.29%) | Won |
| 1992 | 14th National Assembly General Election | Dongjak A (Seoul) | DLP | 38,182 (37.02%) | Won |
| 1996 | 15th National Assembly General Election | Dongjak A (Seoul) | NKP | 40,318 (40.79%) | Won |
| 2000 | 16th National Assembly General Election | Dongjak A (Seoul) | GNP | 40,838 (44.84%) | Won |
| 2008 | 18th National Assembly General Election | Proportional representation (2nd) | Pro-Park Alliance | 2,258,750 (13.18%) | Elected |
| 2013 | 2013 By-election | Hwaseong A (Gyeonggi) | Saenuri | 37,848 (62.66%) | Won |
| 2016 | 20th National Assembly General Election | Hwaseong A (Gyeonggi) | Saenuri | 40,365 (52.29%) | Won |
| 2020 | 21st National Assembly General Election | Proportional representation (2nd) | ORP | 208,719 (0.74%) | Not Elected |
