= Lee Hoi-chang =

South Korean politician (born 1935)

- 이회창
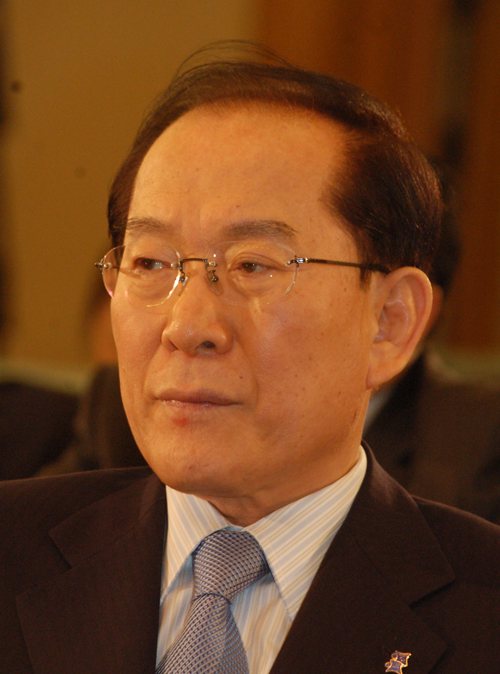
- Lee in 2010

26th Prime Minister of South Korea
- In office 17 December 1993 – 21 April 1994
- President: Kim Young-sam
- Preceded by: Hwang In-sung
- Succeeded by: Lee Yung-dug

Member of the National Assembly
- In office 30 May 2008 – 29 May 2012
- Preceded by: Hong Moon-pyo
- Succeeded by: Hong Moon-pyo
- Constituency: South Chungcheong Hongseong–Yesan
- In office 30 May 2000 – 26 November 2002
- Constituency: Proportional representation
- In office 4 June 1999 – 29 May 2000
- Preceded by: Hong Joon-pyo
- Succeeded by: Maeng Hyung-gyu
- Constituency: Seoul Songpa A
- In office 30 May 1996 – 26 November 1997
- Constituency: National
Party leadership offices
Leader of the Liberty Forward Party
In office 1 February 2008 – 9 May 2011
Preceded by	Position established
Succeeded by	Byun Woong-jeon
Leader of the Grand National Party
In office 30 August 1998 – 20 May 2002
Preceded by	Cho Soon
Succeeded by	Park Kwan-yong (acting)
Leader of the New Korea Party
In office 30 September 1997 – 21 November 1997
Preceded by	Kim Young-sam
Succeeded by	Position abolished

Personal details
- Born: 2 June 1935 (age 91) Sohung County, Kōkai Province, Korea, Empire of Japan
- Party: Independent
- Other political affiliations: New Korea (1996–1997); Grand National (1997–2007); Independent (2007–2008); Liberty Forward (2008–2012); Saenuri (2012–2017); Bareun (2017-2018); Bareunmirae (2018)
- Spouse: Han In-ok (m. 1962; died 2026)
- Children: 2
- Education: Seoul National University
- Religion: Roman Catholic

Korean name
- Hangul: 이회창
- Hanja: 李會昌
- RR: I Hoechang
- MR: I Hoech'ang
- IPA: i.hø.tɕʰaŋ

Art name
- Hangul: 경사
- Hanja: 俓史
- RR: Gyeongsa
- MR: Kyŏngsa

Lee Hoi-chang (Korean: 이회창; pronounced [i.hø.tɕʰaŋ]; born 2 June 1935) is a South Korean politician and lawyer who served as the prime minister of South Korea from 1993 to 1994. A political independent, he was a candidate in the 1997, 2002, and 2007 South Korean presidential elections. Prior to his presidential campaigns, Lee served as an associate justice of the Supreme Court of Korea.

== Early life and education ==
Lee was born to an elite family in Seoheung, Hwanghae Province (part of what is now North Korea), Korea, Empire of Japan. His father, Lee Hong-gyu, a public prosecutor, was appointed to a new post in the southern part of the peninsula and they moved there. Lee studied law at Seoul National University. Lee served as a judge from 1960 to 1980, when he became the country's youngest-ever Supreme Court Justice at the age of 46.

== Political career ==
In 1988, Lee was appointed Chairman of the National Election Commission. He was chosen to head the Board of Audit and Inspection under President Kim Young-sam in 1993. Lee's anti-corruption campaigns in that office gained him the nickname "Bamboo," a Korean term for an upright person of principle. Later in the same year, he was appointed prime minister, but resigned in 1994. His departure was attributed to a frustration with the exclusion of the office of the prime minister from policymaking, in particular concerning North Korea.

In 1996, Lee led the parliamentary campaign of the then-ruling New Korea Party (NKP), which merged with the United Democratic Party to become the Grand National Party (GNP) in 1997. Lee was elected as his party's presidential candidate for the presidential election scheduled for that same year. Lee was initially considered the frontrunner in the race, although his performance in public polling took a hit amid revelations in September that two of his sons had been excused from mandatory military service for reporting for duty underweight, having each lost 22 pounds since their initial physical examinations. Lee ultimately lost to Kim Dae-Jung in the midst of the Asian economic crisis.

Lee again campaigned to win the presidency in 2002, running against Roh Moo-hyun of the incumbent Millennium Democratic Party. Although corruption scandals marred the incumbent government, Lee's campaign suffered from the wave of Anti-American sentiment in Korea generated by the Yangju highway incident. Public opinion of Lee, who was widely seen as being both pro-U.S. and the preferred candidate of the George W. Bush Administration in Washington, D.C., suffered. After losing to Roh by 2% in the December 2002 elections, Lee subsequently announced his retirement from politics.

On November 7, 2007, Lee officially announced his third campaign for the South Korean presidency as an unaligned candidate after quitting the GNP. Launching his campaign late in the race, some two months prior to the election, Lee joined GNP candidate Lee Myung-bak, UNDP contender Chung Dong-young, and Moon Kook-hyun. Running to the right of his opponents, Lee criticized foreign aid to North Korea, arguing that such programs were fiscally burdensome and inappropriate while North Korea continued to pursue the development of nuclear weapons. His presidential bid posed a concern to the conservatives who were eager to regain the presidency after a decade of leftist rule, as it was feared Lee's candidacy would divide the conservative vote; however, Lee Myung-Bak won the December elections with 48.7% of the vote, while Lee Hoi-chang came in third, with approximately 15%. After his 2007 election bid, Lee founded the Liberty Forward Party.

== Political positions ==
Lee has been described as a staunch conservative in the context of South Korean politics. His positions include anti-communism, support for free market capitalism, and a hard-line stance against North Korea. Lee repeatedly criticized Kim Dae-jung's "Sunshine Policy" of engagement and détente with North Korea, and argued for the cessation of foreign aid until the North should dismantle its nuclear weapon program. Lee has called for a crackdown on illegal strikes, and for the appointment of more women to government offices.

== Election results ==
Year	Elections	Constituency	Political party	Votes (%)	Results
1996	15th National Assembly General Election	National (1st)	NKP	6,783,730 (34.52%)	Elected
1997	1997 Presidential Election	South Korea	GNP	9,935,718 (38.74%)	Defeated (2nd)
1999	June 1999 By-election	Songpa A (Seoul)	GNP	42,901 (61.47%)	Won
2000	16th National Assembly General Election	Proportional representation (1st)	GNP	7,365,359 (38.96%)	Elected
2002	2002 Presidential Election	South Korea	GNP	11,443,297 (46.58%)	Defeated (2nd)
2007	2007 Presidential Election	South Korea	Independent	3,559,963 (15.07%)	Defeated (3rd)
2008	18th National Assembly General Election	Hongseong–Yesan (South Chungcheong)	LFP	49,908 (60.99%)	Won

Political offices
Preceded by Hwang In-sung	Prime Minister of South Korea; 17 December 1993–21 April 1994	Succeeded by Lee Yung-dug
Preceded by Kim Young-joon	Chairman of Board of Audit and Inspection; 25 February 1993–17 December 1993	Succeeded by Lee Si-yoon
Preceded by Yun Il-young	Chairman of the National Election Commission; 27 July 1988–24 October 1989	Succeeded by Yoon Gwan
National Assembly of the Republic of Korea
Preceded by	Member of the National Assembly from National (1st, New Korea Party); 30 May 1996–26 November 1997	Succeeded by
Preceded by Hong Joon-pyo	Member of the National Assembly from Songpa District A (Seoul); 4 June 1999–29 May 2000	Succeeded by Maeng Hyung-kyu
Preceded by	Member of the National Assembly from Proportional representation (1st, Grand National Party); 30 May 2000–26 November 2002	Succeeded by
Preceded by Hong Moon-pyo	Member of the National Assembly from Hongseong County–Yesan County (South Chungcheong); 30 May 2008–29 May 2012	Succeeded by Hong Moon-pyo
Party political offices
Preceded by Lee Hong-koo; Himself; Lee Man-sup (Acting)	Chairman of the New Korea Party; 13 March 1997–30 June 1997; 21 July 1997–29 September 1997	Succeeded by Lee Man-sup (Acting); Himself; Lee Han-dong
Preceded by Kim Young-sam	President of the New Korea Party; 30 September 1997–21 November 1997	Succeeded by Office abolished
Preceded by Kim Young-sam (Honor President of the New Korea Party)	Honor President of the Grand National Party; 21 November 1997–31 August 1998	Succeeded by Office abolished
Preceded by Cho Soon; Lee Ki-taek (Acting); Himself; Kang Chang-seong (Acting)	President of the Grand National Party; 31 August 1998–22 May 2000; 31 May 2000–1 April 2002	Succeeded by Kang Chang-seong (Acting); Himself; Park Kwan-yong (Acting); Office abolished
Preceded by New Office	President of the Liberty Forward Party; 1 February 2008–16 March 2010	Succeeded by Office abolished
Preceded by Sim Dae-pyung	Chairman of the Liberty Forward Party; 17 March 2010–9 May 2011	Succeeded by Byeon Ung-jeon
Preceded by Kim Young-sam	New Korea Party, Grand National Party nominee for President of South Korea; 1997, 2002	Succeeded by Lee Myung-bak
Preceded by	Independent nominee for President of South Korea; 2007	Succeeded by
