= 2007 South Korean presidential election =

- 19 December 2007
- Registered: 37,653,518
- Turnout: 63.03% (▼7.80pp)
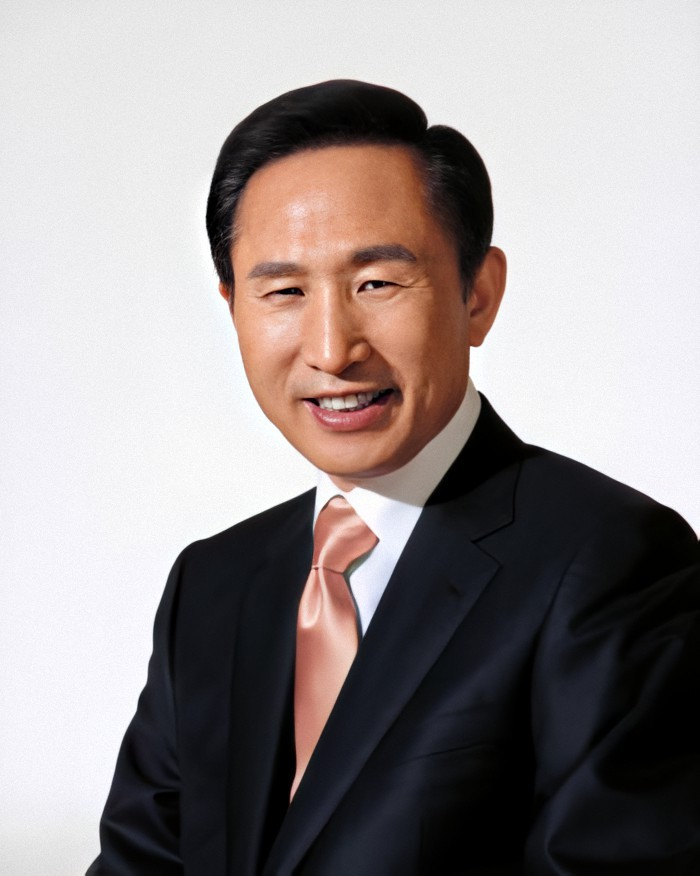

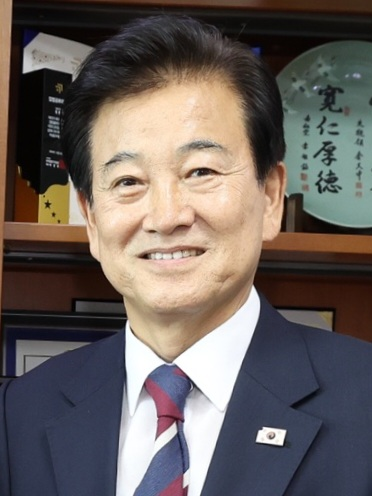

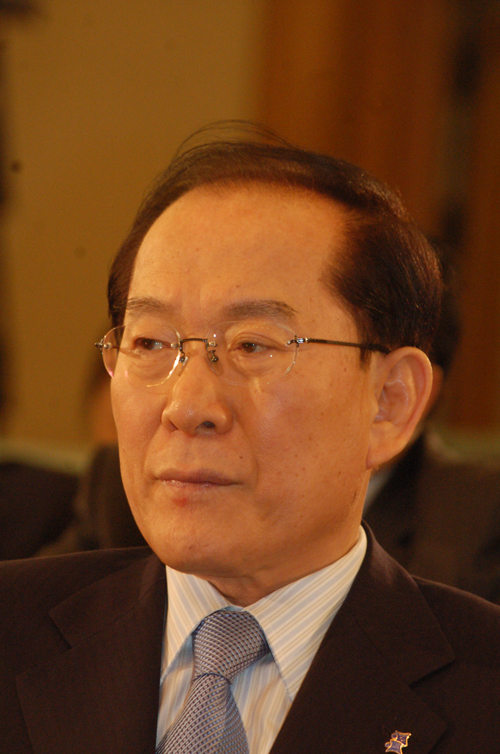

Nominee	Lee Myung-bak	Chung Dong-young
Party	Grand National	New Democratic
Popular vote	11,492,389	6,174,681
Percentage	48.67%	26.15%
Nominee	Lee Hoi-chang	Moon Kook-hyun
Party	Independent	Creative Korea
Popular vote	3,559,963	1,375,498
Percentage	15.08%	5.83%
President before election
Roh Moo-hyun
Independent
Elected President
Lee Myung-bak
Grand National Party

Presidential elections were held in South Korea on 19 December 2007. The elections were won by Lee Myung-bak of the Grand National Party, returning conservatives to the Blue House for the first time in ten years. Lee defeated Grand Unified Democratic New Party nominee Chung Dong-young and independent Lee Hoi-chang by a nearly 2-to-1 margin, the largest since direct elections were reintroduced in 1987. It also marked the first time a president-elect in Korea was under investigation by a prosecutor. Voter turnout was 63%, an all-time low according to the National Election Commission.

== Background ==
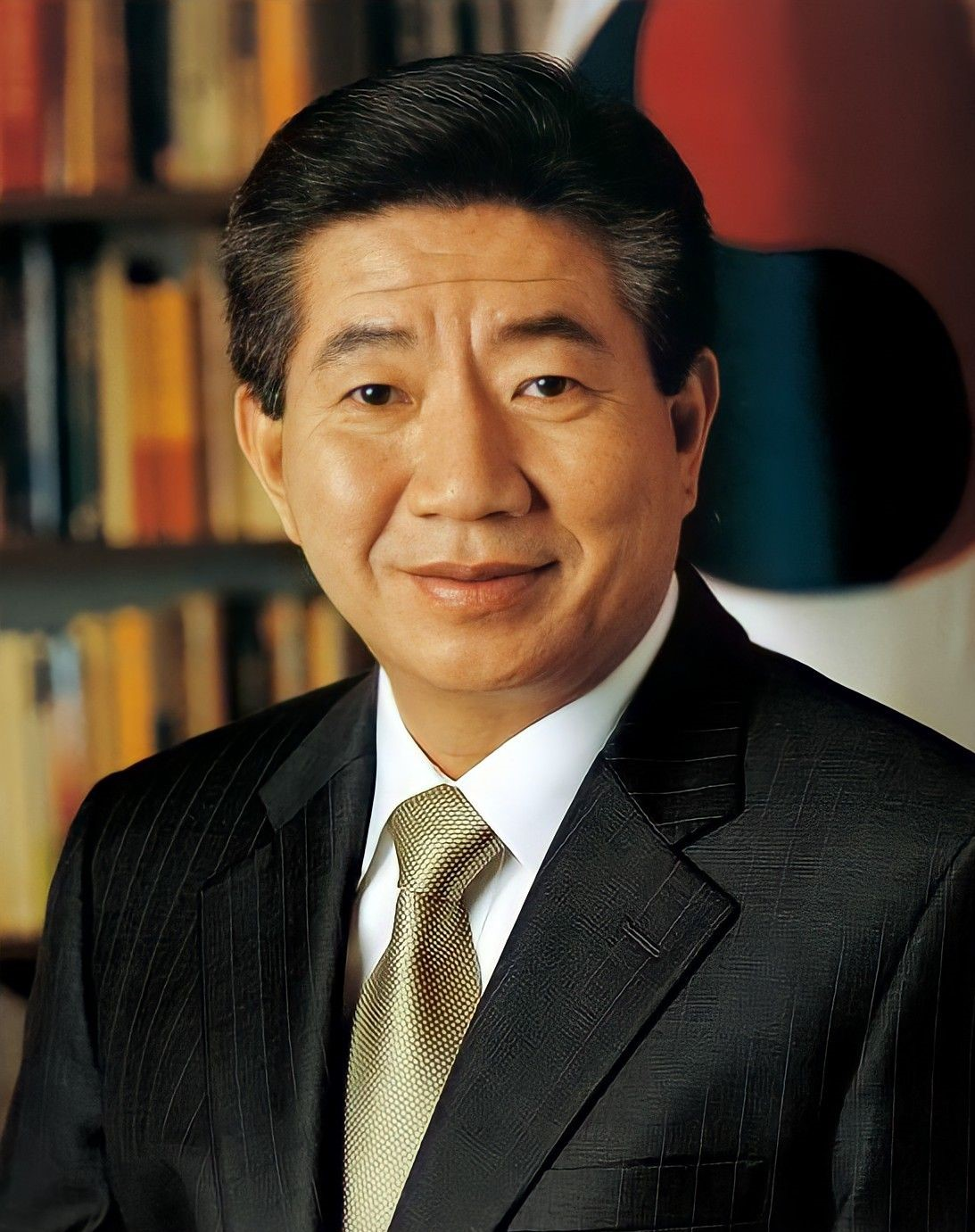
The incumbent in 2007, Roh Moo-hyun. His term expired on 25 February 2008.

On 28 February 2007 the official census was published, identifying the number of eligible voters, with the electoral rolls compiled and published between 21 and 26 November, before being finalised on 12 December. Pre-registration of candidates began on 23 April, with 25–26 November as the dates to officially register.

== Candidates ==
The elections were a three-way race between the ruling Grand Unified Democratic New Party's Chung Dong-young, opposition Grand National Party's Lee Myung-bak, and conservative independent Lee Hoi-chang. Also in the race but polling less than 10% were former Yuhan Kimberly CEO Moon Kook-hyun and congressman Kwon Young-ghil from Ulsan.

=== Grand Unified Democratic New primaries ===
A total of nine candidates ran to be the Grand Unified Democratic New Party presidential candidate;

- Chung Dong-young, former National Assemblyman from North Jeolla Jeonju Deokjin, former Minister of Unification
- Sohn Hak-kyu, former Governor of Gyeonggi, former Minister of Health and Welfare, former National Assemblyman from Gyeonggi Gwangmyeong·Gwangmyeong B
- Lee Hae-chan, National Assemblyman from Seoul Gwanak B, former Prime Minister, former Minister of Education
- Rhyu Si-min, National Assemblyman from Gyeonggi Goyang Deogyang A, former Minister of Health and Welfare
- Han Myeong-sook, National Assemblyman from Gyeonggi Goyang Ilsan A, former Prime Minister, former Minister of Environment, former Minister of Gender Equality
- Shin Ki-nam, National Assemblyman from Seoul Gangseo A
- Chun Jung-bae, National Assemblyman from Gyeonggi Ansan Danwon A, former Minister of Justice
- Choo Mi-ae, former National Assemblyman from Seoul Gwangjin B
- Kim Doo-kwan, former Minister of Interior, former Mayor of South Gyeongsang Namhae

An opinion poll was conducted on 2,400 eligible voters and 10,000 of those who signed up to vote in the primaries between 3 and 5 September; only the top five candidates were allowed to advance to the full primary elections.

Candidate	Electors	%	Non-Members	%	Total	%
Sohn Hak-kyu	2,207	23.4	2,460	26.1	4,667	24.8
Chung Dong-young	2,339	24.8	2,274	24.1	4,613	24.5
Lee Hae-chan	1,339	14.2	1,370	14.5	2,709	14.4
Rhyu Si-min	1,057	11.2	856	9.1	1,913	10.1
Han Myeong-sook	761	8.1	1,015	10.8	1,776	9.4
Others	1,725	18.3	1,453	15.4	3,178	16.9
Total	9,428	100	9,428	100	18,856	100

Despite qualifying for the full primary vote, Han Myeong-sook withdrew her bid for nomination and endorsed Lee Hae-chan before the primary races began. The primary races counted for 90% of the final result and the opinion poll 10%.

Dates	Races	Chung		Sohn		Lee		Rhyu		Total
Dates	Races	Votes	%	Votes	%	Votes	%	Votes	%	Total
15 September	Jeju	3,003	32.8	2,754	30.1	1,866	20.4	1,528	16.7	9,151
15 September	Ulsan	2,262	34.8	1,335	20.5	1,548	23.8	1,362	20.9	6,507
16 September	Gangwon	2,311	31.1	2,359	31.8	2,751	37.1	–	–	7,421
16 September	North Chungcheong	6,334	52.7	2,920	24.3	2,760	23.0	–	–	12,014
17 September	Gwangju	10,841	47.6	7,948	34.9	4,007	17.6	–	–	22,796
17 September	South Jeolla	15,224	46.1	11,958	36.2	5,819	17.6	–	–	33,001
30 September	Busan	6,689	37.6	4,508	25.3	6,614	37.1	–	–	17,811
30 September	South Gyeongsang	4,461	34.8	4,069	31.8	4,276	33.4	–	–	12,806
9 October	Mobile-1	7,004	33.5	7,649	36.5	6,285	30.0	–	–	20,938
11 October	Mobile-2	19,288	34.6	21,359	38.4	15,035	27.0	–	–	55,682
10–12 October	Opinion Poll	21,850	44.1	17,525	35.3	10,216	20.6	–	–	49,591
13-14 October	Mobile-3	35,846	35.5	41,023	40.7	23,964	23.8	–	–	100,833
14 October	North Jeolla	38,078	81.3	6,387	13.6	2,367	5.1	–	–	46,832
14 October	Daejeon	1,766	33.9	1,464	28.1	1,974	37.9	–	–	5,204
14 October	South Chungcheong	2,182	32.6	1,616	24.1	2,895	43.3	–	–	6,693
14 October	Daegu	1,108	25.7	1,530	35.5	1,677	38.9	–	–	4,315
14 October	North Gyeongsang	1,598	33.4	2,017	42.1	1,174	24.5	–	–	4,789
14 October	Gyeonggi	13,025	40.2	13,587	42.0	5,767	17.8	–	–	32,379
14 October	Incheon	3,117	41.0	3,160	41.5	1,331	17.5	–	–	7,608
14 October	Seoul	20,997	49.5	13,631	32.1	7,802	18.4	–	–	42,430
Total		216,984	43.8	168,799	34.0	110,128	22.2	–	–	495,911

At the UNDP National Convention, held on October 15, 2007, Chung was officially named the party's presidential nominee.

=== Grand National primaries ===
Five candidates contested the primaries of the Grand National Party:

- Lee Myung-bak, former Mayor of Seoul, former National Assemblywoman from National, Seoul Jongno
- Park Geun-hye, National Assemblywoman from Daegu Dalseong
- Won Hee-ryong, National Assemblyman from Seoul Yangcheon A
- Hong Joon-pyo, National Assemblyman from Seoul Dongdaemun B
- Go Jin-hwa, National Assemblyman from Seoul Yeongdeungpo A

Former Gyeonggi Governor Sohn Hak-kyu sought to participate, but he later decided to instead run for the UNDP nomination, and failed.

The GNP primary consisted of opinion polling (weighted 20%) and popular vote by pre-registered electors (weighted 80%). The poll and the voting were all conducted on 19 August and the results were announced at the National Convention on 20 August, naming Lee Myung-bak as the official nominee. Because Lee won the race with a slight margin, there was controversy regarding the method primary election used (opinion poll). However, Park Geun-hye conceded her loss to Lee. Park ran again in 2012 and won the primary.

Races	Lee		Park		Won		Hong		Total
Races	Votes	%	Votes	%	Votes	%	Votes	%	Total
Seoul	16,190	58.0	11,113	39.8	330	1.2	271	1.0	27,904
Incheon	3,089	49.1	3,135	49.9	36	0.6	25	0.4	6,285
Gyeonggi	12,779	50.0	12,543	49.1	161	0.6	88	0.3	25,571
Gangwon	1,866	43.0	2,436	56.2	22	0.5	14	0.3	4,338
North Chungcheong	1,823	43.3	2,343	55.7	26	0.6	16	0.4	4,208
South Chungcheong	2,271	41.3	3,179	57.8	26	0.5	24	0.4	5,500
Daejeon	1,272	34.1	2,404	64.4	40	1.1	18	0.5	3,734
North Jeolla	2,141	55.3	1,581	40.8	111	2.9	39	1.0	3,872
South Jeolla	2,692	57.0	1,852	39.2	133	2.8	48	1.0	4,725
Gwangju	1,338	57.6	853	36.8	104	4.5	26	1.1	2,321
North Gyeongsang	4,455	46.3	5,111	53.1	31	0.3	24	0.2	9,621
South Gyeongsang	4,498	48.1	4,748	50.8	76	0.8	30	0.3	9,352
Daegu	2,305	31.1	5,072	68.4	19	0.3	22	0.3	7,418
Busan	5,273	47.2	5,789	51.8	60	0.5	47	0.4	11,169
Ulsan	1,517	47.7	1,637	51.4	18	0.6	11	0.3	3,183
Jeju	707	41.8	852	50.4	126	7.4	7	0.4	1,692
Opinion poll	16,868	51.5	13,984	42.7	1,079	3.3	793	2.4	32,724
Total	81,084	49.6	78,632	48.1	2,398	1.5	1,503	0.9	163,617

=== Lee Hoi-chang ===
1997 and 2002 presidential candidate for GNP, Lee Hoi-chang had announced his candidacy on 7 November 2007 as an independent, not joining GNP primary.

=== Democratic Labor primary ===
The primary election of the Democratic Labour Party involved two types of voting;

- Online voting: All members of this party can log on to the official homepage to cast their vote. Confirmation process by cell phone is needed.
- Off-line voting: There are 227 voting stations around the nation. Voters can cast their vote from 09:00 to 22:00

The total number of party members that were eligible to cast a vote was 50,117.

- Kwon Young-ghil, National Assemblyman from South Gyeongsang Changwon B
- Sim Sang-jung, National Assemblywoman as Proportional Representative
- Roh Hoe-chan, National Assemblyman as Proportional Representative

No candidate received a majority of the votes, so a second round of the presidential primary was scheduled from 10 to 15 September.

Candidate	First round		Second round	
Candidate	Votes	%	Votes	%
Kwon Young-ghil	19,053	49.4	19,109	52.7
Sim Sang-jung	10,064	26.1	17,122	47.3
Roh Hoe-chan	9,478	24.6		
Total	38,595	100	36,231	100
Source: Media Today, Hani

==== First round results by province ====
Dates	Races	Kwon		Sim		Roh		Total
Aug. 24	Jeju	234	37.3%	196	31.3%	197	31.4%	627
Aug. 25	South Jeolla	912	59.8%	291	19.1%	321	21.1%	1,524
Aug. 25	Gwangju	837	60.3%	217	15.6%	334	24.1%	1,388
Aug. 26	North Gyeongsang	586	32.3%	648	35.7%	580	32.0%	1,814
Aug. 26	Daegu	449	38.4%	342	29.3%	377	32.3%	1,168
Aug. 29	South Chungcheong	618	37.7%	482	29.4%	540	32.4%	1,640
Aug. 29	Daejeon	307	39.7%	270	34.9%	196	25.4%	773
Sep. 1	North Jeolla	1,429	56.9%	422	16.8%	660	26.3%	2,511
Sep. 2	South Gyeongsang	2,686	62.9%	911	21.3%	677	15.8%	4,274
Sep. 3	Busan	1,076	48.9%	532	24.2%	592	26.9%	2,200
Sep. 5	Ulsan	1,407	59.8%	599	25.5%	347	14.7%	2,353
Sep. 7	North Chungcheong	332	28.8%	497	43.1%	323	28.0%	1,152
Sep. 8	Gangwon	498	38.2%	392	30.1%	414	31.87	1,304
Sep. 9	Gyeonggi	3,518	57.0%	1,415	22.9%	1,242	20.1%	6,175
Sep. 9	Incheon	1,578	56.4%	669	23.9%	553	19.75%	2,800
Sep. 9	Seoul	2,578	37.5%	2,172	31.6%	2,122	30.9%	6,872
Abroad		8	40.0%	9	45.0%	3	15.0%	20
Total		19,053	49.4%	10,064	26.1%	9,478	24.6%	38,595

=== Creative Korea primary ===
Moon Kook-hyun (문국현), former CEO of Yuhan Kimberly (Kimberly-Clark's company in Korea), was elected as the official presidential candidate of the party on 4 November 2007, through mobile voting amongst party members.

Choice	Votes	%
For Moon	8,884	95.0
Against	468	5.0
Total	9,352	100
Source: Polinews

== Exit polls ==
An exit poll was announced at 18:00 on election day, at which point voting had finished. It predicted Lee Myung-bak had won an absolute majority.

Candidate	Prediction	Estimated %
Lee Myung-bak	Winner	50.3
Chung Dong-young	2nd	26.0
Lee Hoi-chang	3rd	13.5

== Results ==
Result by municipalities

Candidate	Party	Votes	%
Lee Myung-bak	Grand National Party	11,492,389	48.67
Chung Dong-young	Grand Unified Democratic New Party	6,174,681	26.15
Lee Hoi-chang	Independent	3,559,963	15.08
Moon Kook-hyun	Creative Korea Party	1,375,498	5.83
Kwon Young-ghil	Democratic Labor Party	712,121	3.02
Lee In-je	Democratic Party	160,708	0.68
Huh Kyung-young	Economic Republican Party	96,756	0.41
Geum Min	Socialist Party	18,223	0.08
Chung Kun-mo	True Owner Coalition	15,380	0.07
Chun Kwan	Chamsaram Society Full True Act	7,161	0.03
Total		23,612,880	100.00
Valid votes		23,612,880	99.49
Invalid/blank votes		119,974	0.51
Total votes		23,732,854	100.00
Registered voters/turnout		37,653,518	63.03
Source: Park & Lee, IFES

=== By province and city ===
Province/City	Lee Myung-bak		Chung Dong-young		Lee Hoi-chang		Moon Kook-hyun		Kwon Young-ghil		Lee In-je		Huh Kyung-young		Geum Min		Chung Kun-mo		Chun Kwan	
Province/City	Votes	%	Votes	%	Votes	%	Votes	%	Votes	%	Votes	%	Votes	%	Votes	%	Votes	%	Votes	%
Seoul	2,689,162	53.24	1,237,812	24.50	596,226	11.80	358,781	7.10	116,344	2.30	23,214	0.46	22,405	0.44	3,501	0.07	3,013	0.06	911	0.02
Busan	1,018,715	57.91	236,708	13.46	346,319	19.69	94,285	5.36	48,901	2.78	4,599	0.26	7,351	0.42	1,198	0.07	770	0.04	406	0.02
Daegu	876,719	69.38	75,932	6.01	228,199	18.06	50,514	4.00	25,777	2.04	1,847	0.15	3,375	0.27	727	0.06	367	0.03	221	0.02
Incheon	593,283	49.22	286,565	23.77	183,057	15.19	84,814	7.04	42,069	3.49	7,612	0.63	5,769	0.48	1,068	0.09	797	0.07	323	0.03
Gwangju	56,875	8.60	527,588	79.75	22,520	3.40	31,524	4.77	13,597	2.06	7,118	1.08	1,547	0.23	289	0.04	398	0.06	96	0.01
Daejeon	246,008	36.29	159,700	23.56	195,957	28.90	48,143	7.10	17,207	2.54	7,223	1.07	2,356	0.35	683	0.10	467	0.07	204	0.03
Ulsan	279,891	53.98	70,736	13.64	90,905	17.53	28,605	5.52	43,607	8.41	1,884	0.36	2,059	0.40	467	0.09	271	0.05	121	0.02
Gyeonggi	2,603,443	51.89	1,181,936	23.56	670,742	13.37	354,492	7.07	144,830	2.89	30,513	0.61	23,554	0.47	3,207	0.06	3,378	0.07	1,312	0.03
Gangwon	376,004	51.97	136,668	18.89	127,102	17.57	42,552	5.88	28,129	3.89	6,085	0.84	5,063	0.70	849	0.12	615	0.09	436	0.06
North Chungcheong	289,499	41.59	165,637	23.80	162,750	23.38	39,884	5.73	25,285	3.63	7,965	1.14	3,435	0.49	759	0.11	561	0.08	321	0.05
South Chungcheong	313,693	34.26	192,999	21.08	304,259	33.23	43,383	4.74	32,132	3.51	22,592	2.47	3,814	0.42	1,131	0.12	934	0.10	568	0.06
North Jeolla	86,149	9.04	777,236	81.60	34,630	3.64	26,573	2.79	18,139	1.90	6,550	0.69	1,777	0.19	538	0.06	590	0.06	270	0.03
South Jeolla	88,834	9.23	757,309	78.65	34,790	3.61	31,289	3.25	23,178	2.41	23,074	2.40	2,179	0.23	743	0.08	938	0.10	517	0.05
North Gyeongsang	1,033,957	72.59	96,822	6.80	195,526	13.73	47,345	3.32	39,327	2.76	3,823	0.27	4,696	0.33	1,458	0.10	819	0.06	699	0.05
South Gyeongsang	843,662	55.02	189,463	12.36	329,486	21.49	73,893	4.82	82,645	5.39	4,935	0.32	6,063	0.40	1,261	0.08	1,310	0.09	612	0.04
Jeju	96,495	38.67	81,570	32.69	37,495	15.03	19,421	7.78	10,954	4.39	1,674	0.67	1,273	0.51	344	0.14	152	0.06	144	0.06
Total	11,492,389	48.67	6,174,681	26.15	3,559,963	15.08	1,375,498	5.83	712,121	3.02	160,708	0.68	96,756	0.41	18,223	0.08	15,380	0.07	7,161	0.03
Source: National Election Commission

== Other information ==
On April 7, 2011, a National Intelligence Service agent was guilty of investigating Lee Myung-bak's secret real estate-related information before the election.

According to leaked diplomatic cables, Yoo Chong-ha (유종하), the former co-chairman of Lee Myung-bak's presidential election campaign, requested to then American ambassador to South Korea, Alexander Vershbow, to delay the extraction of the main individual of the BBK embezzlement scandal, Christopher Kim (Kim Kyung-joon), to Korea on the request to prevent spreading controversies related to Lee Myung-bak's involvement in the BBK embezzlement scandal during the election season.
