= Liberty Korea Party =

1997–2020 political party in South Korea

Liberty Korea Party 자유한국당 自由韓國黨
- Founded: 21 November 1997 (as Grand National Party); 2 February 2012 (as Saenuri Party); 13 February 2017 (as Liberty Korea Party)
- Dissolved: 17 February 2020
- Merger of: Future Hope Alliance; Advancement Unification Party; Evergreen Korea Party
- Preceded by: New Korea Party; Democratic Party
- Succeeded by: People Power Party
- Headquarters: 18, Gukhoe-daero 70-gil Yeongdeungpo-gu, Seoul; 149-871
- Membership (2018): Approximately 3,500,000
- Ideology: Conservatism (South Korean); South Korean nationalism; Social conservatism; Right-wing populism; Anti-communism
- Political position: Right-wing to far-right; 1998–2012: Centre-right to right-wing
- Regional affiliation: Asia Pacific Democrat Union
- International affiliation: International Democracy Union
- Colours: Blue (Note: as Grand National Party (1997–2004)); Sky blue (Note: as Grand National Party (2004–2012)); Red (Note: as Saenuri Party); Red (Note: as Liberty Korea Party)
- Slogan: Together, into the future

Party flag

- Liberty Korea Party (2017–2020)
- Hangul: 자유한국당
- Hanja: 自由韓國黨
- RR: Jayu Hangukdang
- MR: Chayu Han'guktang

Saenuri Party (2012–2017)
- Hangul: 새누리당
- Hanja: 새누리黨
- RR: Saenuridang
- MR: Saenuridang

Grand National Party (1997–2012)
- Hangul: 한나라당
- Hanja: 한나라黨
- RR: Hannaradang
- MR: Hannaradang

The Liberty Korea Party (Korean: 자유한국당) was a conservative political party in South Korea that was described in multiple various ways as right-wing, right-wing populist, or far-right.

The Grand National Party party was founded in 1997, when the United Democratic Party and New Korea Party merged. In 1997, GNP presidential candidate Lee Hoi-chang lost to National Congress for New Politics candidate Kim Dae-jung, marking the first time in Korea the ruling party peacefully transferred power to the opposition party. In 2004, the party lost its leading status in the National Assembly. In 2007, GNP candidate Lee Myung-bak was elected the president, returning the party into power. In 2008, it recaptured its majority in the National Assembly.

In 2012, it was renamed to the Saenuri Party. That year, its candidate Park Geun-hye won in the presidential election, while the party retained its majority in the National Assembly. In 2016, Park was impeached by the National Assembly due to the 2016 South Korean political scandal, while some party members split and created the Bareun Party, leading the party to lose its plurality in the National Assembly. In 2017, the party was renamed to the Liberty Korea Party. In February 2020, the Liberty Korea Party was succeeded by the United Future Party when it merged with Onward for Future 4.0 and the New Conservative Party to contest the 2020 South Korean legislative election.

The party was generally seen as right-wing, conservative and economically liberal. It espoused socially conservative views. It favored strengthening South Korea's alliance with the United States, as well as improving relations with Japan. The party also took a hawkish stance towards North Korea.

== History ==
=== 1997: Foundation of Grand National Party ===
The Grand National Party (GNP), also known as the Hannara Party (한나라당), was founded in 1997, when the United Democratic Party and New Korea Party merged. The party's earliest ancestor was the Democratic Republican Party under the authoritarian rule of Park Chung Hee in 1963. On Park's death, and at the beginning of the rule of Chun Doo-hwan in 1980, it was reconstituted and renamed as the Democratic Justice Party. In 1988, party member Roh Tae-woo introduced a wide range of political reforms including direct presidential elections and a new constitution.

The party was renamed in 1993, during the presidency of Kim Young-sam, with the merger of other parties to form the Democratic Liberal Party (Minju Jayudang). It was renamed as the New Korea Party (Sinhangukdang) in 1995, and it then became the Grand National Party in November 1997 following its merger with the smaller United Democratic Party and various conservative parties.

=== 1998–2007: Lost ten years ===
Logo of Grand National Party (1997–2004)

Three months later, in 1998, with the election of Kim Dae-jung of the National Congress for New Politics as president, the conservative party's governing role came to an end, and it began its first ever period in opposition, which would last ten years. In October 2012, the Advancement Unification Party merged with the Saenuri Party.

Following the 2000 parliamentary elections, it was the single largest political party, with 54% of the vote and 133 seats out of 271. The party continued to control the National Assembly.

Logo of Grand National Party (2004–2012)

The party was defeated in the parliamentary election in 2004 following the attempted impeachment of President Roh Moo-hyun, gaining only 121 seats out of 299. The party's defeat reflected public disapproval of the attempted impeachment, which was instigated by the party. This was the first time in its history the party had not won the most seats. It gained back five seats in by-elections, bringing it to 127 seats as of 28 October 2005.

=== 2008–2012: Recovering position of the ruling party and Lee Myung-bak government ===
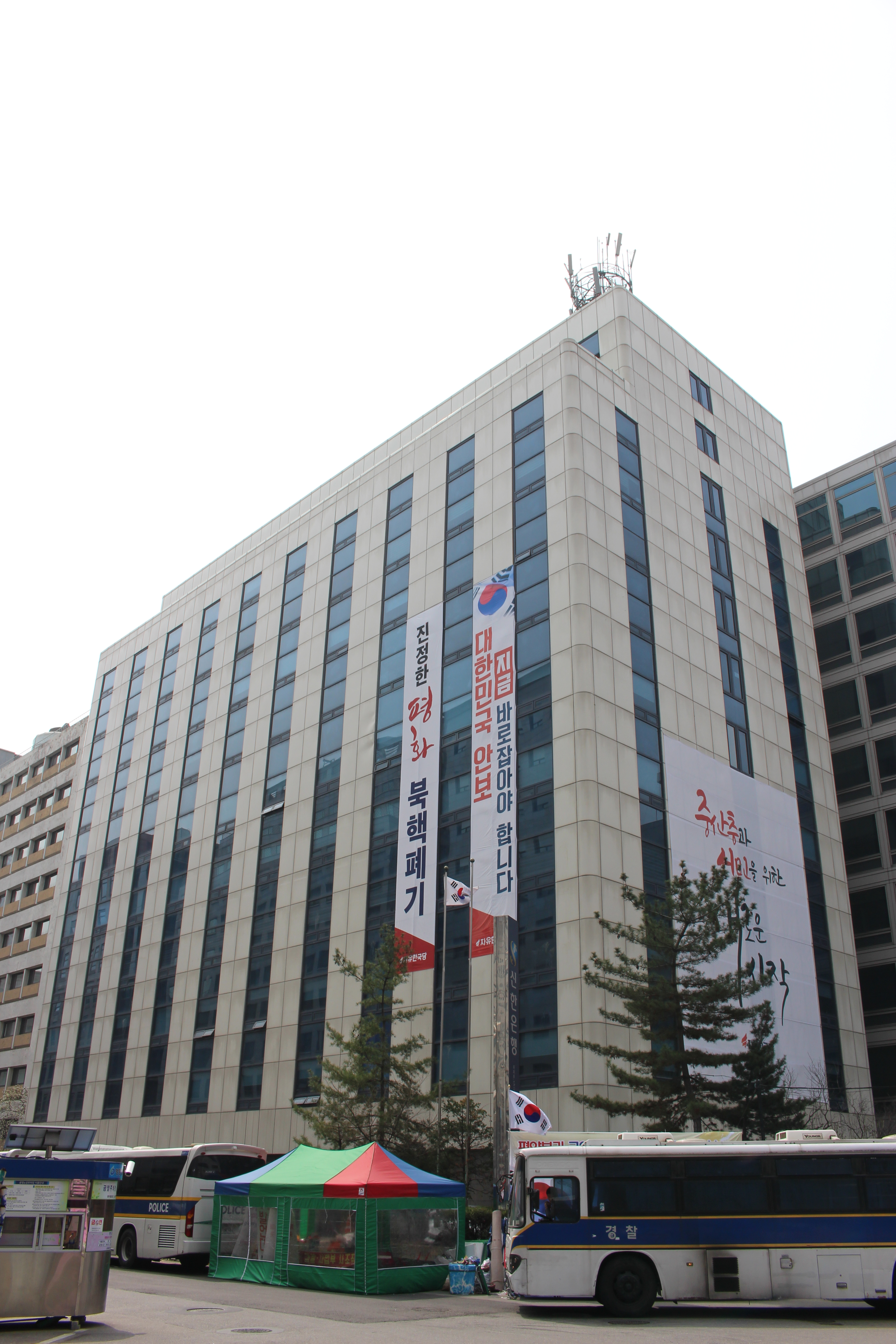
Headquarters of the Liberty Korea Party

On 19 December 2007, the GNP's candidate, former Seoul mayor Lee Myung-bak won the presidential election, ending the party's ten-year period in opposition.

In the April 2008 general election, the GNP secured a majority of 153 seats out of 299 and gained power in the administration and the parliament as well as most local governments, despite low voter turnout.

One of the main bases of popular support of the party originates from the conservative, traditionalist elite and the rural population, except for farmers. It is strongest in the Gyeongsang Province region. Former party head, and 2007 presidential candidate, Park Geun-hye is the daughter of former President Park Chung Hee who ruled from 1961 to 1979. Although Representative Won Hee-ryeong and Hong Jun-pyo ran for the party primary as reformist candidates, former Seoul mayor and official presidential candidate Lee Myung-bak gained more support (about 40%) from the Korean public.

The GNP suffered a setback in the 2010 local elections, losing a total of 775 local seats throughout the counties, but remained with the most seats in the region.

GNP-affiliated politician, Oh Se-hoon, lost his mayoral position in Seoul after the Seoul Free Lunch Referendum.

The Grand National Party celebrated its 14th anniversary on 21 November 2011, amid uncertainties from intra-party crises.

The DDoS attacks during the October 2011 by-election have become a central concern of the GNP as it could potentially disintegrate the party leadership.

=== 2012–2016: Renaming to Saenuri Party and Park Geun-hye government ===
==== Emergency Response Commission ====
Logo of the Saenuri Party (2012-2017)

The Hong Jun-pyo leadership system collapsed on 9 December 2011, and the GNP Emergency Response Commission was launched on 17 December 2011, with Park Geun-hye as commission chairperson, to prepare for the forthcoming Legislative Election 2012 on 11 April 2012, and the Presidential Election 2012 on 19 December 2012. There was a debate with Commission members about whether to transform the Grand National Party into a non-conservative political party or not, but Park said the GNP would never become non-conservative and will follow the real values of conservatism. In 2012, the party was renamed to the Saenuri Party (새누리당; lit. 'New Frontier Party').

=== 2016–2019: 2016 South Korean political scandal and impeachment ===
The party's leader and South Korean President Park Geun-hye was impeached and convicted for her role in a corruption scandal.

=== Succession by the United Future Party ===
The Liberty Korea Party merged with Onward for Future 4.0 and the New Conservative Party on 17 February, launching the United Future Party in time for the upcoming 2020 South Korean legislative election.

== Official color ==
In February 2012, the party changed its political official color from blue to red. This was a change from the previous 30 years where blue was usually the symbol of the conservative parties.

== Ideology and policies ==
The party supports free trade and neoliberal economic policies. It favors maintaining strong cooperation with the United States and Japan, and also believes that each Korean first level province needs to have a sustainable economy. The party is also conservative on social issues such as opposition to legal recognition of same-sex couples. The party supports equality between man and woman, as quoted, "and ensure that both men and women are equally guaranteed opportunities".

=== Four major rivers project ===
One of the party's important policies is to financially secure The Four Major Rivers Project since President Lee Myung-bak was in office. This project's budget disputes have sparked controversial political motions in the National Assembly for three consecutive years.

=== Sejong City project ===
The party has been less inclined toward the creation of a new capital city for South Korea, to be called Sejong City than the previous administration. As of 2012, the Saenuri Party has indicated that some governmental offices will be relocated to the new city, but not all.

=== North Korea ===
The party has been very active in promoting the North Korean Human Rights Law, which would officially condemn the use of torture, public executions and other human rights violations in North Korea.

Party representative Ha Tae Kyung is the founder of Open Radio for North Korea, an NGO dedicated to spreading news and information about democracy, to which citizens of North Korea have little access due to their government's isolationist policies. In April 2012, Saenuri member Cho Myung-Chul became the first North Korean defector elected to the National Assembly. In spring 2012, several Saenuri representatives took part in the Save My Friend protests, organized to oppose China's policy of repatriating North Korean defectors, and expressed their solidarity with Park Sun-young's hunger strike.

== Controversy ==
=== Online sockpuppetry ===
The party has records of secretly hiring and paying university students to generate online replies favorable to the GNP. GNP member Jin Seong-ho (진성호) formally apologized on 2 July 2009, for making a remark that "the GNP occupied Naver," one of the biggest South Korean internet portals.

=== 8 December 2010, controversial bill-passing ===
The party passed a bill relating to the year 2011 national budget without the opposition parties' input on 8 December 2010. It had caused legislative violence before. This process of passing the budget bill sparked controversy over potential illegality. Due to this incident, many South Korean political, academic and citizen groups expressed their outrage against current mainstream politics. The reason for forceful passing of the bill was due mainly to the budget disputes over the controversial Four Major Rivers Project. Many Buddhists in South Korea criticized the budget bill for neglecting the national Temple Stay program. This has led the Jogye Order, the largest Buddhist order in South Korea, to sever ties with the GNP and becoming financially independent without any funding from the government. The interns and the staff working in the National Assembly officially complained on 17 December that their salary was unpaid after the passing of this bill.

=== Views of Individual Party Members ===
Certain members of the Liberty Korea Party have faced criticism for expressing anti-refugee, homophobic views and advocacy of authoritarian rules of the October Restoration.

== List of leaders ==
=== Chairpersons ===
- Note

- ^{ERC} - as head of Emergency Response Committee
- * - as the de facto head of party

No.	Term	Name	Term of office		Election results
No.	Term	Name	Took office	Left office	Election results
1	1	Lee Han-dong	21 November 1997	10 April 1998	Appointed
*	2	Cho Soon*	10 April 1998	5 August 1998	No election
—	—	Lee Han-dong	5 August 1998	31 August 1998	Acting
*	3	Lee Hoi-chang*	31 August 1998	22 May 2000	see 1998 election
—	—	Suh Chung-won	22 May 2000	30 May 2000	Acting
*	4	Lee Hoi-chang*	30 May 2000	2 April 2002	see 2000 election
—	—	Park Kwan-yong	2 April 2002	14 May 2002	Acting
2	5	Suh Chung-won	14 May 2002	30 January 2003	see 2002 election
—	—	Park Hee-tae	30 January 2003	26 June 2003	Acting
3	6	Choi Byung-ryeol	26 June 2003	23 March 2004	see 2003 election
4	7	Park Geun-hye	23 March 2004	5 July 2004	see March 2004 election
—	—	Kim Deok-ryong	5 July 2004	19 July 2004	Acting
(4)	8	Park Geun-hye	19 July 2004	15 June 2006	see July 2004 election
—	—	Kim Yeong-seon	15 June 2006	10 July 2006	Acting
5	9	Kang Jae-sup	11 July 2006	4 July 2008	see 2006 election
6	10	Park Hee-tae	4 July 2008	7 September 2009	see 2008 election
7	11	Chung Mong-joon	7 September 2009	4 June 2010	No election
—	—	Kim Moo-sung^{ERC}	4 June 2010	14 July 2010	Appointed
8	12	Ahn Sang-soo	14 July 2010	9 May 2011	see 2010 election
—	—	Chung Ui-hwa^{ERC}	9 May 2011	4 July 2011	Appointed
9	13	Hong Joon-pyo	4 July 2011	9 December 2011	see 2011 election
—	—	Na Kyung-won	9 December 2011	12 December 2011	Acting
—	—	Hwang Woo-yea	12 December 2011	19 December 2011	Acting
—	—	Park Geun-hye^{ERC}	19 December 2011	15 May 2012	Appointed
10	14	Hwang Woo-yea	15 May 2012	15 May 2014	see 2012 election
—	—	Lee Wan-koo^{ERC}	15 May 2014	14 July 2014	Appointed
11	15	Kim Moo-sung	14 July 2014	14 April 2016	see 2014 election
—	—	Won Yoo-chul	14 April 2016	11 May 2016	Acting
—	—	Chung Jin-suk	11 May 2016	2 June 2016	Acting
—	—	Kim Hee-ok^{ERC}	2 June 2016	9 August 2016	Appointed
12	16	Lee Jung-hyun	9 August 2016	16 December 2016	see 2016 election
—	—	Chung Woo-taik	16 December 2016	29 December 2016	Acting
—	—	In Myung-jin^{ERC}	29 December 2016	1 April 2017	Appointed
—	—	Chung Woo-taik	1 April 2017	3 July 2017	Acting
13	17	Hong Joon-pyo	3 July 2017	14 June 2018	see 2017 election
—	—	Kim Sung-tae	14 June 2018	17 July 2018	Acting
—	—	Kim Byong-joon^{ERC}	17 July 2018	27 February 2019	Appointed
14	18	Hwang Kyo-ahn	27 February 2019	17 February 2020	see 2019 election

=== Assembly leaders (Floor leaders) ===
No.	Name	Term of office	
No.	Name	Took office	Left office
1	Mok Yo-sang	21 November 1997	16 December 1997
2	Lee Sang-deuk	16 December 1997	5 April 1998
3	Ha Soon-bong	5 April 1998	27 August 1998
4	Park Hee-tae	27 August 1998	14 January 1999
5	Lee Boo-young	14 January 1999	1 June 2000
6	Jung Chang-hwa	1 June 2000	13 May 2001
7	Lee Jae-oh	13 May 2001	16 May 2002
8	Lee Kyu-taek	16 May 2002	29 June 2003
9	Hong Sa-duk	29 June 2003	17 March 2004
-	Chung Ui-hwa (acting)	17 March 2004	18 May 2004
10	Kim Duk-ryong	18 May 2004	4 March 2005
11	Kang Jae-sup	4 March 2005	11 January 2006
12	Lee Jae-oh	11 January 2006	12 July 2006
13	Kim Hyong-o	12 July 2006	26 August 2007
14	Ahn Sang-soo	26 August 2007	17 May 2008
15	Hong Joon-pyo	17 May 2008	20 May 2009
16	Ahn Sang-soo	20 May 2009	3 May 2010
17	Kim Moo-sung	3 May 2010	5 May 2011
18	Hwang Woo-yea	5 May 2011	8 May 2012
19	Lee Hahn-koo	8 May 2012	14 May 2013
20	Choi Kyoung-hwan	15 May 2013	7 May 2014
21	Lee Wan-koo	7 May 2014	25 January 2015
22	Yoo Seong-min	1 February 2015	8 July 2015
23	Won Yoo-chul	14 July 2015	3 May 2016
24	Chung Jin-suk	3 May 2016	12 December 2016
25	Chung Woo-taik	16 December 2016	11 December 2017
26	Kim Sung-tae	11 December 2017	11 December 2018
27	Na Kyung-won	11 December 2018	9 December 2019
28	Shim Jae-chul	9 December 2019	17 February 2020

== Election results ==
=== President ===
Election	Candidate	Votes	%	Result
1997	Lee Hoi-chang	9,935,718	38.75	Lost
2002	Lee Hoi-chang	11,443,297	46.59	Lost
2007	Lee Myung-bak	11,492,389	48.67	Elected
2012	Park Geun-hye	15,773,128	51.56	Elected
2017	Hong Joon-pyo	7,841,017	24.04	Lost

=== Legislature ===
Election	Leader	Constituency				Party list				Seats		Position	Status
Election	Leader	Votes	%	Seats	+/-	Votes	%	Seats	+/-	No.	+/–	Position	Status
2000	Lee Hoi-chang	7,365,359	38.96	112 / 227	new			21 / 46	new	133 / 273	new	1st	Opposition
2004	Park Geun-hye	8,083,609	37.9	100 / 243	▼12	7,613,660	35.77	21 / 56	Steady	121 / 299	▼12	2nd	Opposition
2008	Kang Jae-seop	7,478,776	43.45	131 / 245	▲31	6,421,727	37.48	22 / 54	▲1	153 / 299	▲32	1st	Government
2012	Park Geun-hye	9,324,911	43.28	127 / 246	▼4	9,130,651	42.8	25 / 54	▲3	152 / 300	▼1	1st	Government
2016	Kim Moo-sung	9,200,690	38.33	105 / 253	▼22	7,960,272	33.5	17 / 47	▼8	122 / 300	▼30	2nd	Government

=== Local ===
Election	Leader	Metropolitan mayor/Governor	Provincial legislature	Municipal mayor	Municipal legislature
1998	Cho Soon	6 / 16	224 / 616	74 / 232	
2002	Suh Chung-won	11 / 16	467 / 682	136 / 227	
2006	Park Geun-hye	12 / 16	557 / 733	155 / 230	1,621 / 2,888
2010	Chung Mong-joon	6 / 16	288 / 761	82 / 228	1,247 / 2,888
2014	Lee Wan-koo	8 / 17	416 / 789	117 / 226	1,413 / 2,898
2018	Hong Joon-pyo	2 / 17	137 / 824	53 / 226	1,009 / 2,927

== Party splits ==
- Saenuri Party (2017) (2017-since)
- Korean Patriots' Party (2017-since)

== See also ==
- Impeachment of Park Geun-hye
- 2016 South Korean legislative election
- 2017 South Korean presidential election
- 2018 South Korean local elections
- 2019 South Korean Capitol attack
