= 2008 South Korean legislative election =

- 9 April 2008

All 299 seats to the National Assembly 150 seats needed for a majority
- Turnout: 46.08% (▼15.55pp; Const. votes); 46.08% (▼15.55pp; PR votes)
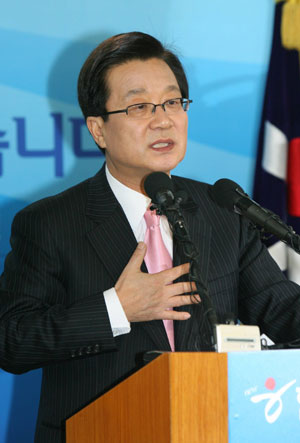

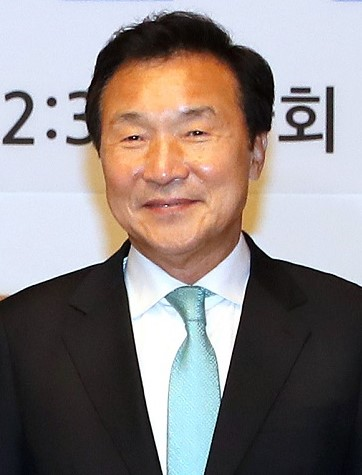

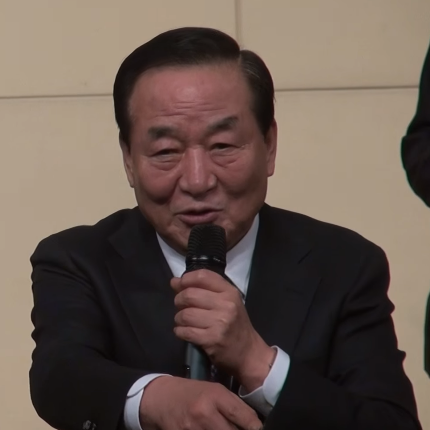

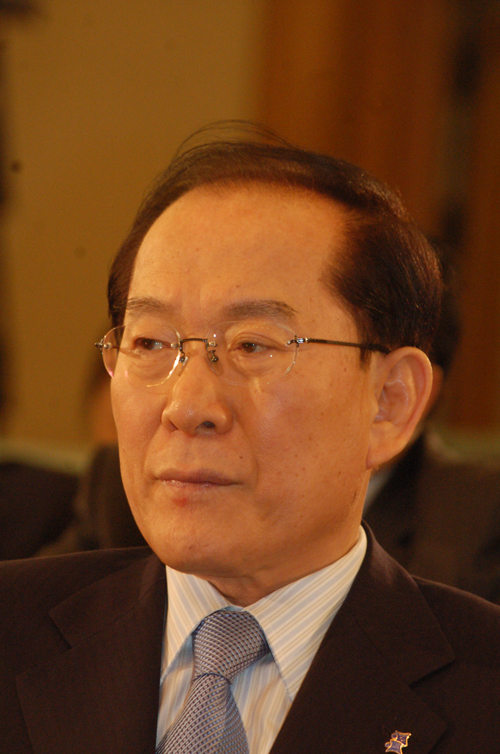

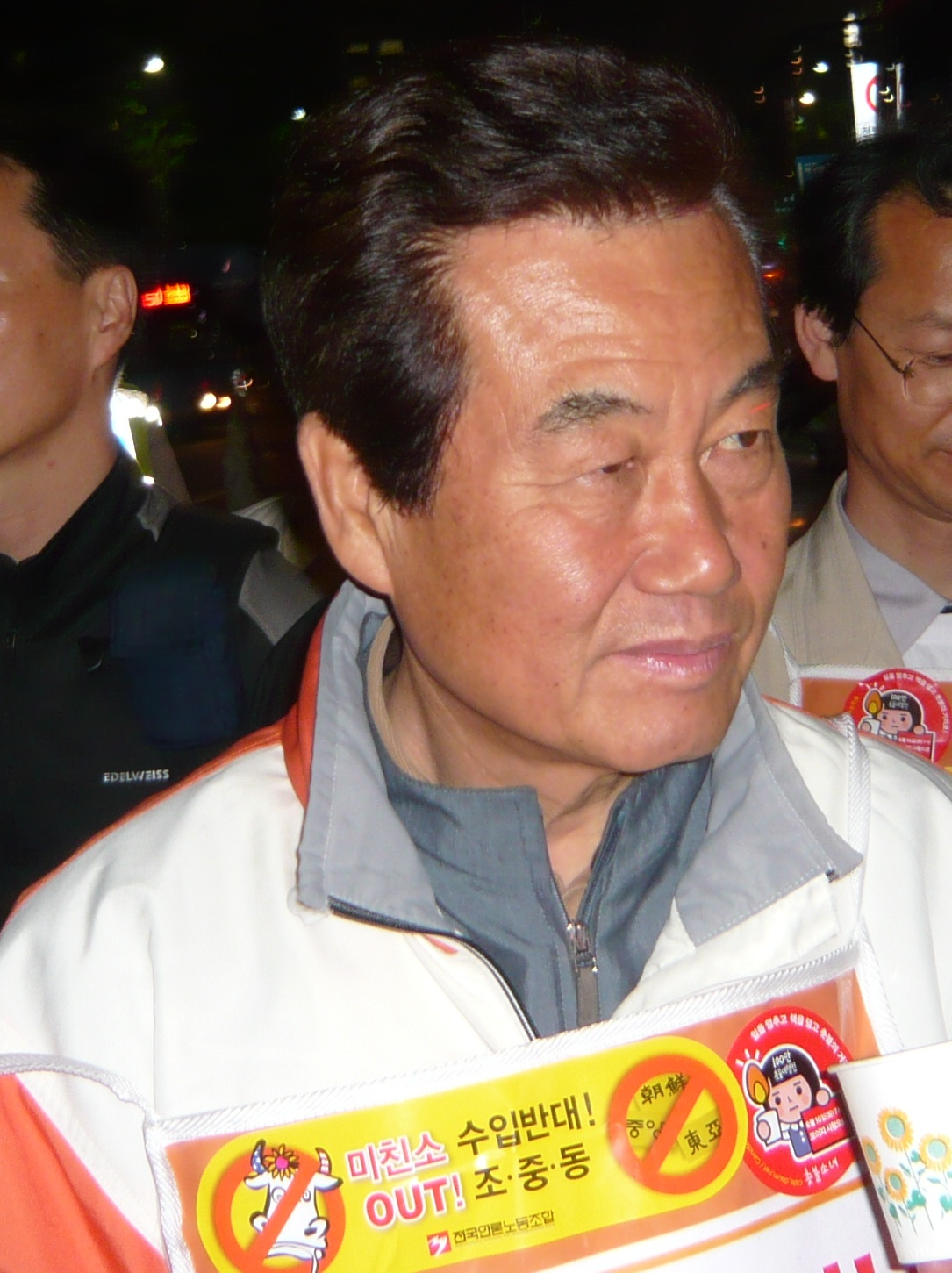
	Majority party	Minority party	Third party
Leader	Kang Jae-sup	Sohn Hak-kyu(Picture); Park Sang-chun	Suh Chung-won
Party	Grand National	United Democratic	Pro-Park
Last election	121 seats (Note: Grand National Party)	161 seats (Note: Uri Party and Democratic Party)	Did not exist
Seats won	153	81	14
Seat change	▲32	▼80	New
Constituency vote	7,478,776	4,977,508	637,351
% and swing	43.45% (▲5.55pp)	28.92% (▼20.16pp)	3.70% (New)
Regional vote	6,421,727	4,313,111	2,258,750
% and swing	37.48% (▲1.71pp)	25.18% (▼21.05pp)	13.18% (New)
	Fourth party	Fifth party	Sixth party
Leader	Lee Hoi-chang	Chon Young-sae	Han Myeon-hee
Party	Liberty Forward	Democratic Labor	Creative Korea
Last election	Did not exist	10 seats	Did not exist
Seats won	18	5	3
Seat change	New	▼5	▲3
Constituency vote	984,751	583,665	72,803
% and swing	5.72% (New)	3.39% (▼0.92pp)	0.42% (New)
Regional vote	1,173,463	973,445	651,993
% and swing	6.85% (New)	5.68% (▼7.35pp)	3.81% (New)
- Results of the election.
Speaker before election
Lim Chae-jung
Uri
Elected Speaker
Kim Hyong-o
Grand National

Legislative elections were held in South Korea on April 9, 2008. The conservative Grand National Party won 153 of 299 seats while the main opposition United Democratic Party won 81 seats. This election marked the lowest-ever voter turnout of 46%.

== Electoral system ==
The election was held under parallel voting, with 245 members elected in single-member constituencies via first-past-the-post voting and the remainder elected via proportional representation. Proportional seats were only available to parties which won three percent of the national valid vote among seat-allocated parties and/or won five or more constituency seats.

== Political parties ==
Parties	Leader	Ideology	Seats		Status
Parties	Leader	Ideology	Last election	Before election	Status
United Democratic Party	Han Myeong-sook	Liberalism	152 / 299 (Note: Uri Party)	141 / 299	Government
United Democratic Party	Han Myeong-sook	Liberalism	9 / 299 (Note: Democratic Party)	141 / 299	Government
Grand National Party	Kang Jae-seop	Conservatism	121 / 299	117 / 299	Opposition
United Liberal Democrats	Kim Nak-seong	Conservatism	4 / 273	Dissolved	Opposition
Liberty Forward Party	Lee Hoi-chang	Conservatism	Did not exist	10 / 299	Opposition
Democratic Labor Party	Kwon Young-ghil	Progressivism	10 / 299	7 / 299	Opposition
Pro-Park Alliance	Suh Chung-won	Conservatism	Did not exist	3 / 299	Opposition
Creative Korea Party	Han Myeon-hee	Centrist reformism	Did not exist	1 / 299	Opposition

As of April 9, 2008, there were six political parties represented in the 18th National Assembly of South Korea, in addition to independents:

- Grand National Party (한나라당, Hannara-dang), led by Kang Jae-seop. The current major conservative party within the National Assembly. (153 seats won)
- United Democratic Party (통합민주당, Tongham Minju-dang), led by Son Hak-gyu. The current major liberal party within the National Assembly. (81 seats won)
- Liberty Forward Party (자유선진당, Jayu Seonjin-dang), led by Lee Hoi-chang. The Chungcheong Region-strongholder and current second conservative party within the National Assembly against the GNP. (18 seats won)
- Pro-Park Alliance (친박연대, Chin-bak Yeon-dae), led by Seo Cheong-won, although their inspirational leader is former GNP leader Park Geun-hye. A conservative coalition with Park Geun-hye within the National Assembly that broke away from the GNP after a dispute on the GNP's candidate nomination, which happened just before the election. (14 seats won)
- Democratic Labor Party (민주노동당, Minju Nodong-dang), led by Chun Young-se. A minor but the most progressive party within the 18th National Assembly, against both the Grand Nationals and Democrats. (5 seats won)
- Creative Korea Party (창조한국당, Changjo Hanguk-dang), led by Moon Kook-hyun. A minor but pro-environmental liberal party within the National Assembly, against the Grand Nationals. (3 seats won)
- (no seats) The New Progressive Party, led by Sim Sang-jeong and Roh Hoe-chan, won 2.94% votes but not enough to gain any seats. The New Progressive Party split from the Democratic Labor Party as a reaction to nationalism after the 2007 presidential elections.

== Results ==
Graph of the party split among 299 seats.
Party	Proportional			Constituency			Total seats	+/–
Party	Votes	%	Seats	Votes	%	Seats	Total seats	+/–
Grand National Party	6,421,727	37.48	22	7,478,776	43.45	131	153	+32
United Democratic Party	4,313,645	25.18	15	4,977,508	28.92	66	81	–80
Pro-Park Alliance	2,258,750	13.18	8	637,351	3.70	6	14	New
Liberty Forward Party	1,173,463	6.85	4	984,751	5.72	14	18	New
Democratic Labor Party	973,445	5.68	3	583,665	3.39	2	5	–5
Creative Korea Party	651,993	3.81	2	72,803	0.42	1	3	+3
New Progressive Party	504,466	2.94	0	229,500	1.33	0	0	0
Christian Party	443,775	2.59	0	3,720	0.02	0	0	0
Party for Peaceful Unification and Family	180,857	1.06	0	334,715	1.94	0	0	New
Party for Displaced People and National Security	93,554	0.55	0	1,130	0.01	0	0	New
Socialist Party	35,496	0.21	0				0	0
Party for Culture and Art	33,966	0.20	0				0	New
Party for Citizen	17,656	0.10	0				0	New
United Vocational Party	16,622	0.10	0	881	0.01	0	0	New
Neo-Future Party	12,122	0.07	0				0	New
People's Association for Salvation				513	0.00	0	0	New
Unification Party				51	0.00	0	0	New
Independents				1,907,326	11.08	25	25	+23
Total	17,131,537	100.00	54	17,212,690	100.00	245	299	0
Valid votes	17,131,537	98.37		17,212,690	98.83			
Invalid/blank votes	284,383	1.63		202,976	1.17			
Total votes	17,415,920	100.00		17,415,666	100.00			
Registered voters/turnout	37,796,035	46.08		37,796,035	46.08			
Source: NEC, CLEA, IPU

=== By city/province ===
Constituency results by city/province
Region	GNP		UDP		LFP		Pro-Park		DLP		PFP		NPP		CKP		Pro-Park ind.		Ind.		Total seats
Region	Seats	%	Seats	%	Seats	%	Seats	%	Seats	%	Seats	%	Seats	%	Seats	%	Seats	%	Seats	%	Total seats
Seoul	40	50.0	7	36.3	0	2.3	0	1.9	0	2.0	0	1.1	0	2.1	1	1.5	–		0	2.8	48
Busan	11	47.3	1	11.8	0	2.8	1	9.2	0	4.3	0	2.3	0	1.0	–		4	13.0	1	8.5	18
Daegu	8	61.1	0	0.8	0	2.7	3	15.7	0	1.8	0	3.4	0	2.3	–		1	5.2	0	6.9	12
Incheon	9	48.0	2	31.6	0	4.8	–		0	3.4	0	2.0	0	1.1	0	0.4	1	2.6	0	6.2	12
Gwangju	0	6.1	7	64.7	0	0.1	–		0	7.7	0	1.4	0	0.5	–		–		1	19.4	8
Daejeon	0	24.8	1	25.7	5	40.0	0	4.4	0	0.8	0	1.0	–		–		–		0	3.2	6
Ulsan	5	53.4	0	2.3	–		0	5.5	0	18.3	0	2.1	0	5.6	–		–		1	12.8	6
Gyeonggi	32	48.3	17	37.0	0	2.4	1	3.8	0	2.8	0	1.6	0	1.0	0	0.1	1	1.2	0	1.7	51
Gangwon	3	44.8	2	24.6	0	8.4	–		0	2.9	0	1.9	0	0.3	0	0.3	–		3	16.8	8
North Chungcheong	1	39.5	6	35.3	1	14.1	0	3.6	0	2.3	0	1.9	0	0.3	0	0.3	–		0	2.6	8
South Chungcheong	0	30.1	1	14.3	8	46.4	0	1.5	0	1.1	0	1.7	0	0.2	0	0.3	–		1	4.2	10
North Jeolla	0	7.2	9	54.7	0	0.7	–		0	1.3	0	2.9	0	1.0	–		–		2	32.3	11
South Jeolla	0	6.1	9	61.8	0	0.1	–		0	4.8	0	3.6	0	0.4	–		–		3	23.3	12
North Gyeongsang	9	54.3	0	3.1	0	2.0	1	6.1	0	1.1	0	2.7	0	0.8	–		4	16.9	1	13.0	15
South Gyeongsang	13	51.4	1	8.6	0	1.1	0	3.9	2	9.1	0	2.6	0	2.5	0	0.4	1	6.0	0	14.4	17
Jeju	1	34.3	3	41.8	0	3.4	0	1.4	0	5.6	0	1.3	–		–		–		0	12.2	3
Total	131	43.4	66	29.0	14	5.7	6	3.7	2	3.4	0	1.9	0	1.3	1	0.4	12	3.0	13	8.1	245

Party list vote results by city/province
Region	GNP	UDP	Pro-Park	LFP	DLP	CKP	Other
Seoul	40.2	28.3	10.4	4.8	3.8	4.6	7.8
Busan	43.5	12.7	22.6	5.2	5.3	3.8	6.9
Daegu	46.6	4.9	32.7	4.0	3.2	2.9	5.7
Incheon	39.7	24.6	10.9	6.1	5.8	4.4	8.6
Gwangju	5.9	70.4	1.3	0.9	9.4	3.9	8.2
Daejeon	24.8	18.6	8.7	34.3	3.9	3.7	6.1
Ulsan	42.9	9.3	18.7	3.4	14.2	3.5	8.0
Gyeonggi	40.9	26.4	11.4	4.7	4.8	4.4	7.3
Gangwon	45.5	18.6	12.3	6.3	5.9	3.7	7.6
North Chungcheong	34.0	23.9	12.3	13.7	5.7	3.4	7.0
South Chungcheong	27.1	13.5	7.2	37.8	4.7	2.5	7.1
North Jeolla	9.3	64.3	2.3	1.6	7.4	2.9	12.1
South Jeolla	6.4	66.9	1.8	1.1	10.1	2.3	11.5
North Gyeongsang	53.5	5.6	23.6	2.9	4.1	2.4	8.0
South Gyeongsang	45.0	10.5	18.0	4.2	10.6	3.4	8.2
Jeju	32.4	30.2	12.3	4.2	10.0	5.1	5.8
Overall total	37.5	25.2	13.2	6.8	5.7	3.8	7.8
Seat allocation	22	15	8	4	3	2	0
