= Results of the 2020 South Korean legislative election =

Legislative elections were held in South Korea on 15 April 2020. All 300 members of the National Assembly were elected, 253 from first-past-the-post constituencies and 47 from proportional party lists.

== By single-member constituency ==
=== Seoul ===
==== Jongno ====
Jongno
Party	Candidate	Votes	%
Democratic	Lee Nak-yon	54,902	58.38
United Future	Hwang Kyo-ahn	37,594	39.97
Our Republican	Han Min-ho	417	0.44
Minjung	Oh In-hwan	276	0.29
Independent	Kim Yong-deok	260	0.27
NRDP	Park Jun-yeong	194	0.20
Peace and Human Rights	Lee Jeong-hui	139	0.14
Hannara	Kim Hyeong-suk	71	0.07
New Politics	Paik Byeong-chan	65	0.06
People's Democratic	Park So-hyeon	63	0.06
Republican	Kim Han-wool	57	0.06
Rejected ballots		1,201	–
Turnout		95,239	70.8
Registered electors		134,516	
Democratic hold			

==== Jung-Seongdong A ====
Jung–Seongdong A
Party	Candidate	Votes	%	±%
Democratic	Hong Ihk-pyo	70,387	54.3	+9.2
United Future	Jin Soo-hee	53,107	41.0	+1.6
Justice	Jeong Hye-yeon	5,465	4.2	+2.1
National Revolutionary Dividends	Lee Jeong-seop	786	0.6	new
Rejected ballots		1,455	–	–
Turnout		131,200	68.3	+9.5
Registered electors		192,161		
Democratic hold				

==== Jung-Seongdong B ====
Jung–Seongdong B
Party	Candidate	Votes	%	±%
Democratic	Park Sung-joon	64,071	52.0	+27.7
United Future	Ji Sang-wook	58,300	47.3	+9.3
National Revolutionary Dividends	Lee Ju-yang	937	0.8	new
Rejected ballots		1,392	–	–
Turnout		124,700	67.9	+9.4
Registered electors		183,779		
Democratic gain from United Future		Swing		

==== Yongsan ====
Yongsan
Party	Candidate	Votes	%	±%
United Future	Kwon Yeong-se	63,891	47.8	+7.9
Democratic	Kang Tae-woong	63,001	47.1	+4.3
Justice	Jeong Youn-wook	4,251	3.1	+0.3
Minsaeng	Kwon Hyeok-moon	1,311	1.0	new
Minjung	Kim Eun-hee	648	0.5	−0.2
National Revolutionary Dividends	Kim Hee-jeon	541	0.4	new
Rejected ballots		1,400	–	–
Turnout		135,043	66.5	+8.8
Registered electors		203,233		
United Future gain from Democratic		Swing		

==== Gwangjin A ====
Gwangjin A
Party	Candidate	Votes	%	±%
Democratic	Jeon Hye-sook	56,608	53.7	+13.0
United Future	Kim Byeong-min	42,822	40.6	+2.7
Justice	Oh Bong-seok	3,690	3.5	new
Minsaeng	Lim Dong-sun	1,842	1.7	−18.2
National Revolutionary Dividends	Lee Seung-wook	492	0.5	new
Rejected ballots		1,052	–	–
Turnout		106,506	68.0	+9.5
Registered electors		156,559		
Democratic hold				

==== Gwangjin B ====
Gwangjin B
Party	Candidate	Votes	%	±%
Democratic	Ko Min-jung	54,210	50.4	+1.9
United Future	Oh Se-hoon	51,464	47.8	+10.6
National Revolutionary Dividends	Heo Jeong-yeon	370	0.3	new
Mirae	Oh Tae-yang	1,574	1.5	new
Rejected ballots		958	–	–
Turnout		108,576	71.2	+11.4
Registered electors		152,526		
Democratic hold		Swing		

==== Dongdaemun A ====
Dongdaemun A
Party	Candidate	Votes	%	±%
Democratic	Ahn Gyu-back	51,551	52.7	+9.9
United Future	Heo Yong-beom	40,874	41.8	+3.5
Independent	Lee Ga-hyeon	2,009	2.1	new
Minsaeng	Baek Geum-san	1,679	1.7	new
Minjung	Oh Jun-seok	1,264	1.3	new
National Revolutionary Dividends	Jeong Gong-myeong	393	0.4	new
Rejected ballots		1,257	–	–
Turnout		99,027	66.5	+7.8
Registered electors		148,942		
Democratic hold				

==== Dongdaemun B ====
Dongdaemun B
Party	Candidate	Votes	%	±%
Democratic	Jang Gyeong-tae	55,230	54.5	−3.7
United Future	Lee Hye-hoon	44,360	43.8	+5.6
Minjung	Kim Jong-min	1,198	1.2	new
National Revolutionary Dividends	Park Gyeong-hui	464	0.5	new
Independent	Min Byung-doo	Resignation	–	–
Rejected ballots		3,216	–	–
Turnout		104,468	66.6	+7.6
Registered electors		156,971		
Democratic hold		Swing		

==== Jungnang A ====
Jungnang A
Party	Candidate	Votes	%	±%
Democratic	Seo Young-kyo	55,185	55.8	+3.6
United Future	Kim Sam-hwa	34,670	36.3	+4.8
Justice Party	Kim Ji-soo	2,706	2.8	new
Independent	Lee Seong-bok	1,105	1.2	new
Minsaeng Party	Lee Ki-hyun	754	0.8	new
Minjung Party	Choi Seo-hyeon	624	0.7	−0.2
National Revolutionary Dividends	Lee Ju-yang	492	0.5	new
Rejected ballots		1,145	–	–
Turnout		96,685	61.0	+7.6
Registered electors		158,409		
Democratic hold		Swing		

==== Jungnang B ====
Jungnang B
Party	Candidate	Votes	%	±%
Democratic	Park Hong-keun	74,131	59.3	+15.0
United Future	Yoon Sang-il	47,603	38.1	+1.4
Minjung Party	Lee So-young	1,956	1.6	new
National Revolutionary Dividends	Shin Hwang-woo	722	0.6	new
Korean Welfare Party	Min Jeong-gi	625	0.5	new
Rejected ballots		1,362	–	–
Turnout		126,399	65.7	+6.8
Registered electors		192,460		
Democratic hold		Swing		

==== Seongbuk A ====
Seongbuk A
Party	Candidate	Votes	%	±%
Democratic	Kim Young-bae	82,954	60.9	+13.0
United Future	Han Sang-hak	49,727	36.5	+0.3
Minsaeng Party	Park Chun-rim	2,642	1.9	new
National Revolutionary Dividends	Choi Won-yong	880	0.6	new
Rejected ballots		1,983	–	–
Turnout		136,203	68.3	+7.7
Registered electors		202,294		
Democratic hold		Swing		

==== Seongbuk B ====
Seongbuk B
Party	Candidate	Votes	%	±%
Democratic	Ki Dong-min	70,740	59.4	+15.0
United Future	Chung Tae-keun	45,543	38.2	+1.4
Minjung Party	Pyon Jae-seung	2,060	1.7	new
National Revolutionary Dividends	Lim Kyung-ho	829	0.7	new
Rejected ballots		1,434	–	–
Turnout		119,172	66.7	+9.2
Registered electors		180,743		
Democratic hold		Swing		

==== Gangbuk A ====
Gangbuk A
Party	Candidate	Votes	%	±%
Democratic	Chun Joon-ho	49,490	57.7	+15.0
United Future	Cheong Yang-seog	33,840	39.5	+1.4
Minjung Party	Kim Eun-jin	1,457	1.7	new
Independent	Seon Gye-seon	903	1.1	new
Rejected ballots		1,505	–	–
Turnout		85,690	61.8	+7.0
Registered electors		141,126		
Democratic gain from United Future		Swing		

==== Gangbuk B ====
Gangbuk B
Party	Candidate	Votes	%	±%
Democratic	Park Yong-jin	57,013	64.5	+13.4
United Future	Ahn Hong-ryeol	30,708	34.7	−0.5
National Revolutionary Dividends	Jwa Tae-hong	737	0.7	new
Rejected ballots		1,181	–	–
Turnout		89,639	65.2	+8.5
Registered electors		137,495		
Democratic hold		Swing		

==== Dobong A ====
Dobong A
Party	Candidate	Votes	%	±%
Democratic	In Jae-keun	50,653	54.0	−6.1
United Future	Kim Jae-seop	37,697	40.5	+0.6
Justice	Yoon Oh	4,577	4.9	New
National Revolutionary Dividends	Park Young-chan	554	0.6	new
Rejected ballots		950	–	–
Turnout		93,751	66.4	+9.7
Registered electors		142,625		
Democratic hold				

==== Dobong B ====
Dobong B
Party	Candidate	Votes	%	±%
Democratic	Oh Gi-hyung	51,756	53.0	+16.6
United Future	Kim Seon-dong	44,554	45.6	+2.9
Independent	Choi Soon-ja	683	0.7	new
National Revolutionary Dividends	Kim Gwan-seok	641	0.7	new
Rejected ballots		1,292	–	–
Turnout		97,634	66.5	+7.3
Registered electors		148,641		
Democratic gain from United Future		Swing		

==== Nowon A ====
Nowon A
Party	Candidate	Votes	%	±%
Democratic	Koh Yong-jin	53,911	56.8	+15.0
United Future	Lee No-keun	36,782	38.7	−0.6
Minjung Party	Choi Na-young	3,761	4.0	new
National Revolutionary Dividends	Cho Deok-sil	487	0.5	new
Rejected ballots		1,092	–	–
Turnout		94,941	69.1	+6.8
Registered electors		138,917		
Democratic hold		Swing		

==== Nowon B ====
Nowon B
Party	Candidate	Votes	%	±%
Democratic	Woo Won-shik	70,740	62.7	+10.7
United Future	Lee Dong-seop	45,543	36.5	+6.7
National Revolutionary Dividends	Cha Dong-ik	906	0.8	new
Rejected ballots		1,382	–	–
Turnout		114,406	70.7	+6.0
Registered electors		163,736		
Democratic hold		Swing		

==== Nowon C ====
Nowon C
Party	Candidate	Votes	%	±%
Democratic	Kim Seong-hwan	55,556	53.2	+39.2
United Future	Lee Jun-seok	46,373	44.4	+13.0
Justice	Lee Nam-soo	1,645	1.6	−0.3
Minjung	Kim Seon-gyeong	551	0.5	+0.2
National Revolutionary Dividends	Kim Gwang-cheol	400	0.4	new
Rejected ballots		890	–	–
Turnout		104,525	69.6	+4.7
Registered electors		151,435		
Democratic gain from People		Swing		

==== Eunpyeong A ====
Eunpyeong A
Party	Candidate	Votes	%	±%
Democratic	Park Joo-min	82,954	64.3	+9.4
United Future	Hong In-jeong	49,727	33.9	−6.9
Minsaeng Party	Han Woong	2,642	1.2	new
National Revolutionary Dividends	Rho Byong-hyeon	880	0.6	new
Rejected ballots		1,439	–	–
Turnout		134,310	65.6	+9.8
Registered electors		206,917		
Democratic hold		Swing		

==== Eunpyeong B ====
Eunpyeong B
Party	Candidate	Votes	%	±%
Democratic	Kang Byung-won	78,897	57.4	+20.7
United Future	Heo Yong-seok	49,796	36.2	new
Justice	Kim Jong-min	6,127	4.5	new
Basic Income Party	Shin Min-joo	2,600	1.9	new
Rejected ballots		625	–	–
Turnout		137,420	66.2	+8.1
Registered electors		210,129		
Democratic hold				

==== Seodaemun A ====
Seodaemun A
Party	Candidate	Votes	%	±%
Democratic	Woo Sang-ho	47,980	53.3	−1.6
United Future	Lee Sung-hyun	37,522	41.6	+1.4
Independent	Shin Ji-ye	2,916	3.2	new
Minjung	Chun Jin-hui	1,026	1.1	new
National Revolutionary Dividends Party	Chun Jin-hui	331	0.4	new
Our Republican Party	Shin Min-ho	330	0.4	new
Rejected ballots		991	–	–
Turnout		90,105	69.1	+6.8
Registered electors		131,930		
Democratic hold				

==== Seodaemun B ====
Seodaemun B
Party	Candidate	Votes	%	±%
Democratic	Kim Yeong-ho	58,328	61.3	+12.4
United Future	Song Joo-beom	35,853	37.7	−2.2
National Revolutionary Dividends	Oh Soo-cheong	922	1.0	new
Rejected ballots		1,425	–	–
Turnout		95,103	68.3	+7.2
Registered electors		141,386		
Democratic hold				

==== Mapo A ====
Mapo A
Party	Candidate	Votes	%	±%
Democratic	Noh Woong-rae	53,160	56.0	+4.1
United Future	Kang Seung-kyoo	40,775	43.0	+9.8
Reunification Democratic Party	Park Seon-ah	512	0.5	new
National Revolutionary Dividends	Kim Myung-sook	482	0.5	new
Rejected ballots		1,129	–	–
Turnout		94,929	70.6	+7.1
Registered electors		136,147		
Democratic hold				

==== Mapo B ====
Mapo B
Party	Candidate	Votes	%	±%
Democratic	Jung Chung-rae	50,653	53.8	+11.5
United Future	Kim Sung-dong	37,697	36.8	+4.8
Justice Party	Oh Hyun-joo	2,334	8.9	+4.9
National Revolutionary Dividends	Lee So-young	554	0.6	new
Rejected ballots		1,591	–	–
Turnout		128,984	68.8	+6.9
Registered electors		189,669		
Democratic hold				

==== Yangcheon A ====
Yangcheon A
Party	Candidate	Votes	%	±%
Democratic	Hwang Hee	78,196	51.9	−0.3
United Future	Song Han-seop	67,814	45.0	+5.1
Independent	Yeom Dong-uk	4,244	2.8	−5.2
National Revolutionary Dividends	Choi Sa-hyun	556	0.4	new
Rejected ballots		1,366	–	–
Turnout		150,810	73.6	+9.2
Registered electors		206,747		
Democratic hold				

==== Yangcheon B ====
Yangcheon B
Party	Candidate	Votes	%	±%
Democratic	Lee Yong-seon	66,759	51.9	+17.6
United Future	Sohn Yeong-taek	47,897	41.3	−0.7
National Revolutionary Dividends	Choi Sa-hyun	789	0.7	new
Our Republican	Park Cheol-seong	577	0.5	new
Rejected ballots		1,553	–	–
Turnout		116,022	66.7	+8.0
Registered electors		176,413		
Democratic hold				

==== Gangseo A ====
Gangseo A
Party	Candidate	Votes	%	±%
Democratic	Kang Sun-woo	63,397	55.9	+18.7
United Future	Gu Sang-chan	43,519	38.4	+6.2
Independent	Paek Cheol	5,490	4.8	−3.4
Independent	Kim Beom-tae	529	0.5	new
National Revolutionary Dividends	No Kyung-hyui	480	0.4	new
Rejected ballots		1,101	–	–
Turnout		173,756	65.9	+6.8
Registered electors		206,747		
Democratic hold				

==== Gangseo B ====
Gangseo B
Party	Candidate	Votes	%	±%
Democratic	Jin Seong-jun	66,684	56.2	+18.9
United Future	Kim Tae-woo	50,281	42.3	−3.6
Our Republican	Park Hye-yeong	1,087	0.9	new
National Revolutionary Dividends	Chung Hong-dae	705	0.6	new
Rejected ballots		1,524	–	–
Turnout		118,757	68.3	+9.2
Registered electors		176,017		
Democratic hold				

==== Gangseo C ====
Gangseo C
Party	Candidate	Votes	%	±%
Democratic	Han Jeoung-ae	64,515	59.9	+16.4
United Future	Kim Cheol-geun	39,355	36.6	+4.3
Independent	Kim Tae-yun	1,659	1.5	new
Minjung	Kwon Hye-in	1,575	1.5	new
National Revolutionary Dividends Party	Do Chae-sook	559	0.5	new
Rejected ballots		1,299	–	–
Turnout		107,663	69.1	+6.8
Registered electors		161,351		
Democratic hold				

==== Guro A ====
Guro A
Party	Candidate	Votes	%	±%
Democratic	Lee In-young	75,865	53.9	+1.9
United Future	Kim Jae-sik	55,347	39.3	+5.4
Justice	Lee Ho-seong	6,722	4.8	+2.4
Minjung	Yoo Seon-hui	1,539	1.1	+0.2
National Revolutionary Dividends Party	Kim Jang-won	628	0.5	new
Our Republican Party	Hwang In-kyu	330	576	new
Rejected ballots		1,404	–	–
Turnout		140,677	69.1	+6.2
Registered electors		205,756		
Democratic hold				

==== Guro B ====
Guro B
Party	Candidate	Votes	%	±%
Democratic	Youn Kun-young	56,065	57.1	+5.0
United Future	Kim Yong-tae	37,018	37.7	+3.7
Independent	Kang Yo-shik	4,558	4.6	new
National Revolutionary Dividends	Choi Sa-hyun	638	0.7	new
Rejected ballots		1,119	–	–
Turnout		98,279	67.8	+6.8
Registered electors		146,644		
Democratic hold				

==== Geumcheon ====
Geumcheon
Party	Candidate	Votes	%	±%
Democratic	Choi Ki-sang	64,735	49.6	+16.6
United Future	Kang Seong-man	46,278	35.5	+2.9
Independent	Cha Seong-soo	18,365	14.1	new
National Revolutionary Dividends	Park Chang-rae	1,057	0.8	new
Rejected ballots		1,742	–	–
Turnout		130,435	63.6	+7.6
Registered electors		207,730		
Democratic gain from				

==== Yeongdeungpo A ====
Yeongdeungpo A
Party	Candidate	Votes	%	±%
Democratic	Kim Young-joo	72,445	56.3	+11.0
United Future	Moon Byeong-ho	49,292	38.3	−1.5
Justice Party	Jeong Jae-min	6,267	4.9	+1.0
National Revolutionary Dividends	Ahn Seong-woo	760	0.6	new
Rejected ballots		1,355	–	–
Turnout		128,764	66.4	+4.7
Registered electors		187,977		
Democratic hold				

==== Yeongdeungpo B ====
Yeongdeungpo B
Party	Candidate	Votes	%	±%
Democratic	Kim Min-seok	47,075	50.3	+9.2
United Future	Park Yong-chan	41,537	44.4	+6.7
Independent	Lee Jung-hyun	3,311	3.5	new
Minsaeng	Kim Ji-hyang	1,278	1.4	new
National Revolutionary Dividends	Lee Sang-ryun	456	0.5	new
Rejected ballots		1,153	–	–
Turnout		93,657	68.0	+9.0
Registered electors		139,384		
Democratic hold				

==== Dongjak A ====
Dongjak A
Party	Candidate	Votes	%	±%
Democratic	Kim Byung-kee	70,290	55.3	+18.8
United Future	Jang Jin-young	54,526	42.9	+8.2
Minjung Party	Yoon Hyun-joo	1,494	1.2	+0.2
National Revolutionary Dividends	Lee Seo-eun	812	0.6	new
Rejected ballots		1,489	–	–
Turnout		127,122	69.4	+6.8
Registered electors		185,301		
Democratic hold		Swing		

==== Dongjak B ====
Dongjak B
Party	Candidate	Votes	%	±%
Democratic	Lee Su-jin	61,407	52.2	+20.7
United Future	Na Kyung-won	53,026	45.0	+1.6
Justice Party	Lee Ho-yeong	2,334	2.0	new
Minjung Party	Choi Seo-hyeon	614	0.5	−0.1
National Revolutionary Dividends	Lee Ju-yang	345	0.3	new
Rejected ballots		1,274	–	–
Turnout		119,000	73.4	+9.0
Registered electors		162,038		
Democratic gain from United Future		Swing		

==== Gwanak A ====
Gwanak A
Party	Candidate	Votes	%	±%
Democratic	Yoo Ki-hong	83,479	55.9	+18.4
Independent	Kim Sung-shik	50,078	33.6	new
Justice Party	Lee Dong-yeong	6,306	4.2	+1.2
Our Republican Party	Kwon Mi-sung	2,223	2.3	new
Minsaeng	Lee Seung-han	2,749	1.8	new
Minjung Party	Song Myeong-suk	2,223	1.5	+0.6
National Revolutionary Dividends	Kim Yong-tae	947	0.6	new
Rejected ballots		1,274	–	–
Turnout		119,000	73.4	+9.0
Registered electors		162,038		
Democratic gain from Independent		Swing		

==== Gwanak B ====
Gwanak B
Party	Candidate	Votes	%	±%
Democratic	Jeong Tae-ho	72,531	53.9	+17.6
United Future	Oh Shin-hwan	56,130	41.7	+4.7
Minsaeng	Han In-soo	2,143	1.6	new
Minjung Party	Kim Han-young	1,483	1.1	−0.8
Independent	Ryu Hyeon-sun	1,066	0.8	new
National Revolutionary Dividends	Seo Hui-seong	625	0.5	new
Our Republican Party	Park Hyun-seong	589	0.4	new
Rejected ballots		1,781	–	–
Turnout		134,563	65.0	+6.1
Registered electors		209,866		
Democratic gain from United Future		Swing		

==== Seocho A ====
Seocho A
Party	Candidate	Votes	%	±%
United Future	Yoon Hee-sook	72,896	62.6	+5.6
Democratic	Lee Jeong-geun	42,971	36.9	+8.4
National Revolutionary Dividends	Shin Bang-ho	575	0.5	new
Rejected ballots		1,060	–	–
Turnout		116,442	72.2	+12.6
Registered electors		162,087		
United Future hold		Swing		

==== Seocho B ====
Seocho B
Party	Candidate	Votes	%	±%
United Future	Park Sung-joong	49,727	53.7	+6.8
Democratic	Park Kyung-mee	82,954	45.0	+8.6
Minsaeng Party	Lee Jung-ho	1,105	0.8	new
National Revolutionary Dividends	Lee Jin-ho	733	0.5	new
Rejected ballots		1,331	–	–
Turnout		138,725	71.4	+11.2
Registered electors		196,164		
United Future hold		Swing		

==== Gangnam A ====
Gangnam A
Party	Candidate	Votes	%	±%
United Future	Thae Ku-min	60,324	58.4	+3.6
Democratic	Kim Sung-gon	40,935	39.6	−5.5
Minsaeng Party	Chung Dong-hui	1,378	1.3	new
National Revolutionary Dividends	Kim Jong-hun	642	0.6	new
Rejected ballots		1,206	–	–
Turnout		103,279	62.4	+12.8
Registered electors		167,537		
United Future hold		Swing		

==== Gangnam B ====
Gangnam B
Party	Candidate	Votes	%	±%
United Future	Park Jin	51,762	51.0	+6.5
Democratic	Jeon Hyun-hee	47,157	46.4	+5.1
Minsaeng Party	Kim Kwang-jong	1,341	1.3	new
Independent	Kim Min-chan	919	0.9	new
National Revolutionary Dividends	Kang Ki-hyun	422	0.4	new
Rejected ballots		868	–	–
Turnout		101,601	73.0	+10.6
Registered electors		140,330		
United Future hold		Swing		

==== Gangnam C ====
Gangnam C
Party	Candidate	Votes	%	±%
United Future	Yu Kyung-jun	70,917	65.4	+7.6
Democratic	Kim Han-gyu	36,423	33.6	−6.0
National Revolutionary Dividends	Go Ahn-seong	343	0.3	new
Pro-Park New Party	Do Yo-jong	270	0.3	new
Saenuri	Yan Han-byeol	269	0.3	new
Our Republican	Chun Tae-yeol	246	0.2	new
Rejected ballots		968	–	–
Turnout		108,468	72.1	+14.5
Registered electors		151,713		
United Future hold		Swing		

==== Songpa A ====
Songpa A
Party	Candidate	Votes	%	±%
United Future	Kim Woong	58,318	51.2	+7.2
Democratic	Cho Jae-hui	54,704	48.0	+6.4
National Revolutionary Dividends	Cho Eun-jeong	875	0.8	new
Rejected ballots		1088	–	–
Turnout		113,897	72.1	+10.4
Registered electors		159,514		
United Future hold				

==== Songpa B ====
Songpa B
Party	Candidate	Votes	%	±%
United Future	Bae Hyun-jin	72,072	50.5	+50.5
Democratic	Cho Jae-sung	65,763	46.0	+2.0
Justice	Ahn Sook-hyun	4,330	3.0	new
National Revolutionary Dividends	Kim Joo-yeon	362	0.3	new
Our Republican Party	Kwon Joo	302	0.2	new
Rejected ballots		1106	–	–
Turnout		142,829	72.0	+13.3
Registered electors		199,967		
United Future gain from Democratic		Swing		

==== Songpa C ====
Songpa C
Party	Candidate	Votes	%	±%
Democratic	Nam In-soon	78,789	52.5	+7.6
United Future	Kim Keun-sik	64,869	43.2	+3.5
Minsaeng	Choi Jo-woong	3,310	2.2	new
Independent	Lee Jong-sik	2,415	1.6	new
National Revolutionary Dividends	Kang Deok-su	721	0.5	new
Rejected ballots		1,409	–	–
Turnout		150,104	70.3	+8.6
Registered electors		151,513		
Democratic hold				

==== Gangdong A ====
Gangdong A
Party	Candidate	Votes	%	±%
Democratic	Jin Sun-mee	50,653	54.0	−6.1
United Future	Lee Su-hui	37,697	40.5	+0.6
National Revolutionary Dividends	Kang Ok-gi	554	0.6	new
Rejected ballots		950	–	–
Turnout		93,751	66.4	+9.7
Registered electors		142,625		
Democratic hold				

==== Gangdong B ====
Gangdong B
Party	Candidate	Votes	%	±%
Democratic	Lee Hae-sik	59,175	54.5	+13.4
United Future	Lee Jae-young	45,617	42.1	+4.1
Justice Party	Kwon Jung-do	2,996	2.8	new
National Revolutionary Dividends	Park Hui-yeol	705	0.7	new
Rejected ballots		1158	–	–
Turnout		108,493	66.2	+8.3
Registered electors		165,610		
Democratic hold				
