= 2021 People Power Party leadership election =

South Korean party election

- 11 June 2021
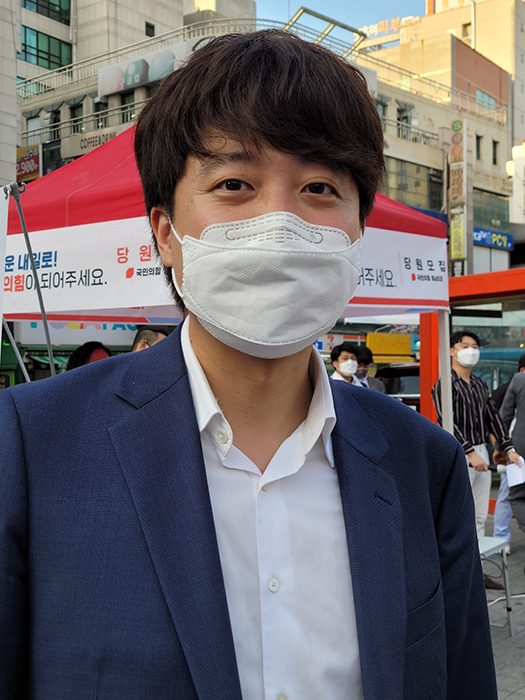

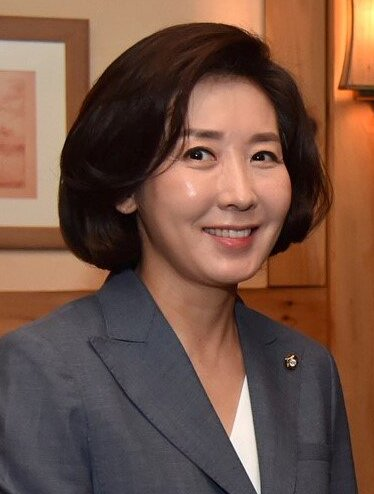

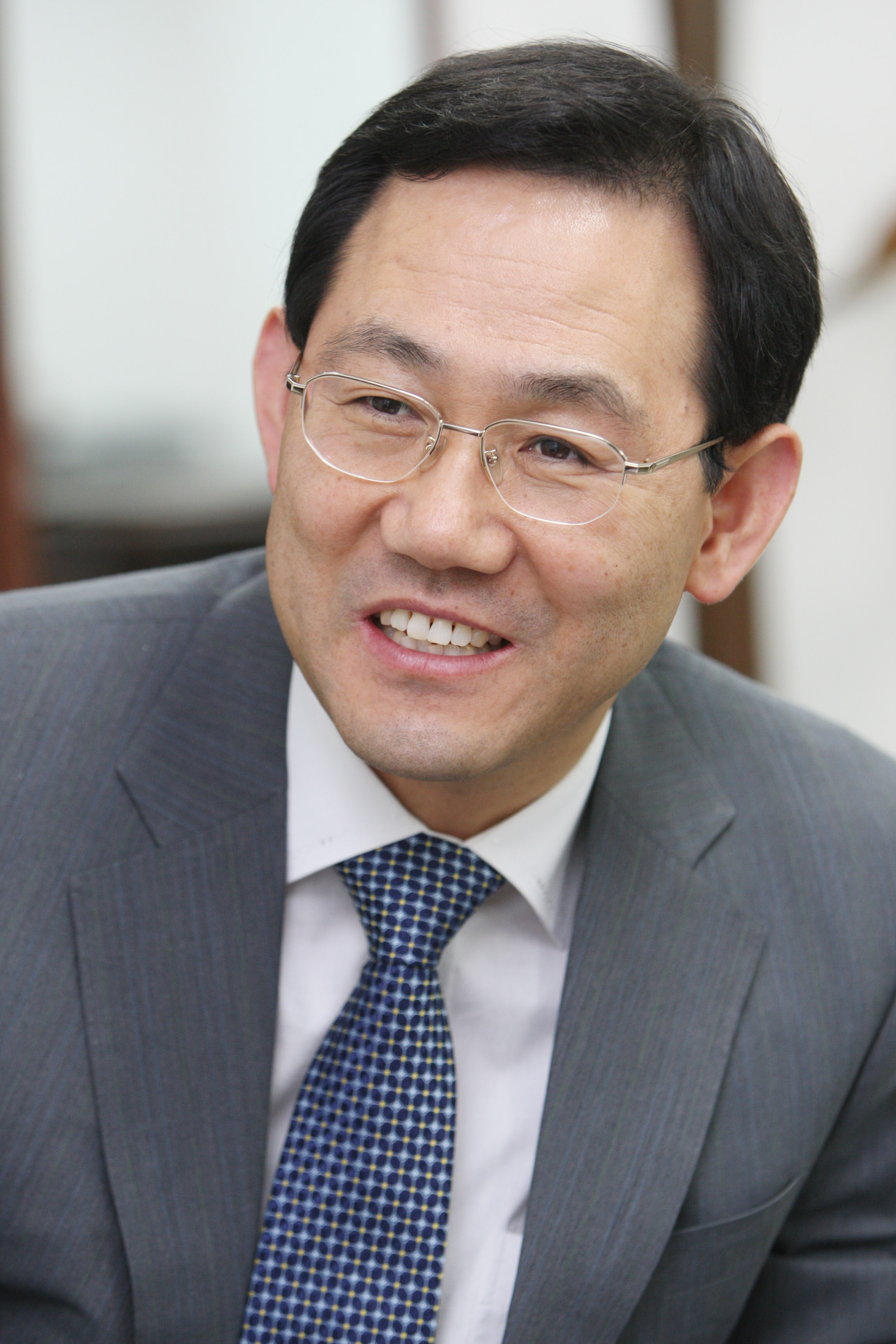

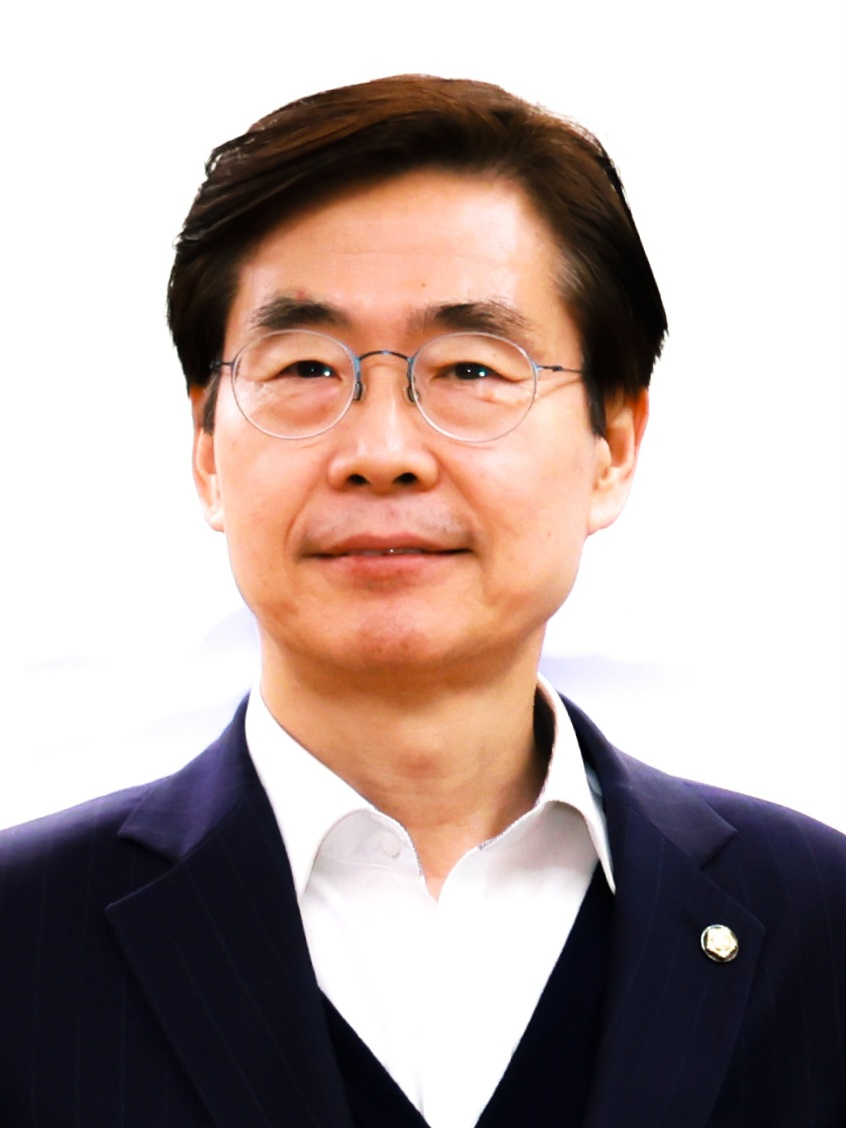

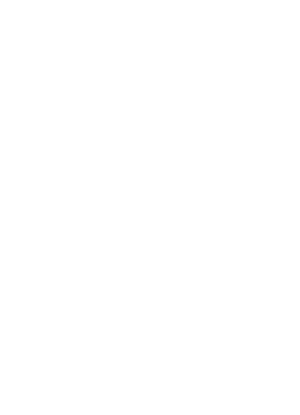
Candidate	Lee Jun-seok	Na Kyung-won	Joo Ho-young
Delegate count	55,820; 37.41%	61,077; 40.93%	25,109; 16.82%
Opinion polling	58.76%	28.27%	7.47%
Total	93,392; 43.81%	79,151; 37.13%	29,883; 14.02%
Candidate	Cho Kyoung-tae	Hong Moon-pyo
Delegate count	4,347; 2.91%	2,841; 1.90
Opinion polling	2.57%	2.94%
Total	5,988; 2.80%	4,721; 2.21%
Leader before election
Kim Gi-hyeon (Interim)
Elected Leader
Lee Jun-seok

The People Power Party held a leadership election on 11 June 2021.

The party leadership was vacant since 15 April 2020 following the resignation of Hwang Kyo-ahn on that day due to the party's crushing defeat in the 2020 election. Until the leadership election is held, there were 4 acting party presidents — Shim Jae-chul, Joo Ho-young, Kim Chong-in and Kim Gi-hyeon; all except Kim Chong-in were the parliamentary leaders. A new party president and vice presidents (including one representing youths) were elected in this election.

Lee Jun-seok, who was the most favourable candidate in this election, won party presidency. Jo Soo-jin, Bae Hyun-jin, Kim Jae-won and Jung Mi-kyung was also elected the Vice Presidents of the party. Kim Yong-tae was chosen the Vice President (representing youths).

== Background ==
On 15 January 2019, the former Prime Minister Hwang Kyo-ahn officially joined the Liberty Korea Party (LKP), and after 2 weeks, he announced his bid to run for the leadership election. On 27 February, Hwang was officially elected the President of the LKP, receiving overall 50.0%. He led the revival of the party in Yeongnam region at the 2019 by-elections, but its supports were far behind of the Democratic Party. As the general election was coming near, the LKP merged with the New Conservative Party (NCP) and the Onward for Future 4.0 to establish the United Future Party (UFP) on 17 February 2020.

=== 2020 election and aftermath ===
The UFP then ran for the general election along with its satellite partner, Future Korea Party (FKP). Nevertheless, the UFP-FKP alliance faced a disastrous defeat, with only securing 103 out of 300 seats. Hwang Kyo-ahn, who contested for Jongno, lost to the Democratic candidate Lee Nak-yon. Following the crushing defeat, Hwang made an announcement to resign as the party president. As the party presidency was vacant, the parliamentary leader Shim Jae-chul became the acting president.

However, as Shim also lost to Lee Jae-jung in his constituency, the party soon elected Joo Ho-young as the new parliamentary leader; he also automatically became the acting president on 8 May. On 22 May, the party agreed to establish the Emergency Response Committee, led by Kim Chong-in, where the term was set until the by-elections on 7 April 2021. On 28 May, the FKP was merged into the UFP, and was de-registered the next day.

=== Change the party name ===
Under the leadership of Kim Chong-in, the party has decided to change its name to the People Power Party (PPP; Korean: 국민의힘) on 31 August, as a part of the renovation. It has also requested the name change to the National Election Commission. The name change was officially confirmed on 2 September.

=== 2021 by-elections and revival ===
In the by-elections on 7 April 2021, the People Power Party (PPP) achieved an outright victory, where Oh Se-hoon and Park Heong-joon was elected the Mayor of Seoul and the Mayor of Busan respectively. As the term of Kim Chong-in ended, Joo Ho-young returned as the acting president. However, he announced his resignation on 16 April, and remained until replaced by Kim Gi-hyeon on 30 April.

== Campaign ==
=== Announcement ===
On 23 April 2021, Cho Hae-jin, the MP for Miryang-Uiryeong-Haman-Changnyeong, announced his candidacy for the leadership, which was the first within the party. He stated that in order to win the 2022 presidential election, the party needs a "leadership of tolerance and integration" to unite pan-opposition blocs. He also emphasised himself as a "Yeongnam-born having an image of Seoul Metropolitan Area-born".

On 10 May, Joo Ho-young, the MP for Suseong 1st, as well as the former interim President of the party, officially launched a bid for the leadership election. He mentioned that he would lead a pan-opposition unity to win the 2022 presidential election. He promised to make the party to practice freedom and justice, party to unite with centrists, party with a competent policy and authority, party that youths are participating, and an opened and communicating smart party.

On 14 May, Kim Eun-hye, the MP for Bundang 1st, announced her campaign to become the President of the People Power Party (PPP) that was vacant following the resignation of Hwang Kyo-ahn. She indicated that the party needs a "revolutionary change" to win the 2022 presidential election. She promised to adopt a youth quota system for the party.

On 21 May, a day before the nomination, Cho Hae-jin declared to run for vice presidency instead of presidency, stating that he was "not prepared to contest". He, however, indicated that he would keep fulfilling his promises as a vice president should he is elected.

=== Nomination and elimination ===
On 28 May, 5 candidates were formally confirmed as the final candidates, they are: Cho Kyoung-tae, Hong Moon-pyo, Joo Ho-young, Lee Jun-seok and Na Kyung-won. Other 3 candidates — Kim Eun-hye, Kim Woong and Yoon Young-seok, were eliminated.

== Candidates ==
=== Presidential candidates ===
==== Nominated ====
Candidate	Born	Political career	Announced
Cho Kyoung-tae	10 January 1968 (age 58); Goseong, South Gyeongsang	MP for Saha 2nd (since 2004)	11 May 2021
Hong Moon-pyo	17 November 1947 (age 78); Hongseong, South Chungcheong	MP for Hongseong-Yesan (2004-2008; since 2012)	3 May 2021
Joo Ho-young	8 January 1960 (age 66); Uljin, North Gyeongsang	MP for Suseong 1st (2020-); Acting President of the PPP (2021); Parliamentary leader of the UFP/PPP (2020-2021); Acting President of the UFP (2020); Acting President of the Bareun Party (2017); Parliamentary leader of the Bareun Party (2017); Minister for Special Affairs (2009-2010); MP for Suseong 2nd (2004-2020)	10 May 2021
Lee Jun-seok	31 March 1985 (age 41); Seoul	UFP/PPP Division Chief for Nowon 3rd (2020-)	20 May 2021
Na Kyung-won	6 December 1963 (age 62); Seoul	MP for Dongjak 2nd (2014-2020); Parliamentary leader of the Liberty Korea Party (2018-2019); MP for Central District, Seoul (2008-2011)	20 May 2021

==== Eliminated ====
On 28 May 2021, 3 candidates — Kim Eun-hye, Kim Woong and Yoon Young-seok, were eliminated.

Candidate	Born	Political career	Announced	Eliminated
Kim Eun-hye	6 October 1971 (age 54); Seoul	MP for Bundang 1st (2020-); Spokesperson of the UFP/PPP (2020-2021)	14 May 2021	28 May 2021
Kim Woong	5 May 1970 (age 56); Suncheon, South Jeolla	MP for Songpa 1st (2020-)	13 May 2021	28 May 2021
Yoon Young-seok	7 October 1964 (age 61); Yangsan, South Gyeongsang	MP for Yangsan 1st (2016-); MP for Yangsan (2012-2016)	6 May 2021	28 May 2021

==== Potential ====
The following MPs were touted by the media as potential candidates for the leadership of the People Power Party but did not stand:

- Kim Moo-sung, former President of the Saenuri Party
- Yun Hee-suk, MP for Seocho 1st

==== Withdrawn ====
The following MPs announced that they would seek the leadership of the People Power Party but subsequently did not stand, withdrew from the race, or stood for vice presidency, due to insufficient support or other reasons:

- Cho Hae-jin, MP for Miryang-Uiryeong-Haman-Changnyeong (2020-), former MP for Miryang-Changnyeong (2008-2016) — running for vice presidency
- Kim So-yeon, former Member of the Daejeon Metropolitan Council for West District 6th (2018-2020)
- Shin Sang-jin, former MP for Jungwon (2005-2012; 2015–2020)

==== Declined ====
The following MPs were touted by the media as potential candidates for the leadership of the People Power Party but subsequently declined to stand:

- Chung Jin-suk, MP for Gongju-Buyeo-Cheongyang (2016-), former MP for Gongju-Yeongi (2000-2004; 2005-2008)
- Kwon Yeong-se, MP for Yongsan (2020-), former MP for Yeongdeungpo 2nd (2002-2012)

=== Vice presidential candidates ===
==== Nominated ====
- Bae Hyun-jin, MP for Songpa 2nd (2020-)
- Cheon Kang-jung
- Cho Dae-won
- Cho Hae-jin, MP for Miryang-Uiryeong-Haman-Changnyeong (2020-), former MP for Miryang-Changnyeong (2008-2016)
- Do Tae-woo, lawyer, former pre-candidate for Daegu East District 2nd
- Jo Soo-jin, proportional MP (2020-)
- Jung Mi-kyung, former MP for Gwonseon/Suwon 2nd (2008-2012; 2014–2016)
- Kim Jae-won, former MP for Sangju-Gunwi-Uiseong-Cheongsong (2017-2020), former MP for Gunwi-Uiseong-Cheongsong (2004-2008; 2012–2016)
- Lee Young, proportional MP (2020-)
- Won Young-sup, former Saenuri candidate for Gwanak 1st in 2016

==== Potential ====
- Heo Eun-a, proportional MP (2020-)
- Hwangbo Seung-hee, MP for Central-Yeongdo (2020-)

=== Vice presidential candidates (representing youths) ===
==== Nominated ====
- Ham Seul-ong
- Hong Jong-ki, Deputy Spokesperson of the PPP, former candidate for Suwon 4th
- Kang Tae-rin
- Kim Yong-tae, former candidate for Gwangmyeong 2nd
- Lee Yong, proportional MP (2020-)

== Endorsements ==
=== Lee Jun-seok ===
- Oh Se-hoon, Mayor of Seoul (2006-2011; 2021-)
- Ha Tae-keung, MP for Busan Haeundae A Parliamentary Constituency (2012-)

== Timeline ==
=== 2020 ===
- 15 April: Hwang Kyo-ahn announced his resignation as the party president. Shim Jae-chul became the acting president.
- 8 May: Joo Ho-young was elected the new parliamentary leader, succeeding acting presidency from Shim Jae-chul.
- 22 May: Emergency Response Committee led by Kim Chong-in established, which the term was until 8 April 2021.

=== 2021 ===
- 8 April: The term of Kim Chong-in ended. Joo Ho-young returned as the acting president.
- 30 April: Kim Gi-hyeon was elected the new parliamentary leader, succeeding acting presidency from Joo Ho-young.
- 11 May: The party decided to hold a leadership election on 11 June.
- 22 May:
  - 09:00 – Nominations for candidates open.
  - 17:00 — Nominations close, and 8 presidential and 10 vice-presidential candidates were confirmed.
- 26 May: Opinion pollings for pre-candidates start.
- 27 May: Opinion pollings for pre-candidates are supposed to end and 3 to be eliminated on this day, but is postponed to the next day due to lack of samples.
- 28 May: Opinion pollings for pre-candidates end. Kim Eun-hye, Kim Woong and Yoon Young-seok are eliminated.
- 30 May: Campaigns will be held in Gwangju, South Jeolla, North Jeolla and Jeju.
- 2 June: Campaigns will be held in Busan, Ulsan and South Gyeongsang.
- 3 June: Campaigns will be held in Daegu and North Gyeongsang.
- 4 June: Campaigns will be held in Daejeon, Sejong, North Chungcheong and South Chungcheong.
- 6 June: Campaigns will be held in Seoul, Incheon, Gyeonggi and Gangwon.
- 7 June: Electoral college ballots (mobile) begin.
- 8 June: Electoral college ballots (mobile) close.
- 9 June: Electoral college ballots (ARS) and non-member opinion polling begin.
- 10 June: Electoral college ballots (ARS) and non-member opinion polling close.
- 11 June: Result was announced; Lee Jun-seok was declared the new President of the party.

== Opinion polling ==
=== Post-nomination ===
Fieldwork date	Polling firm	Sample size	Lee	Na	Joo	Hong	Cho KT	Kim W (Note: Eliminated.)	Kim EH	Yoon	Shin (Note: Included in the polling, although he was not nominated.)	Don't know	Lead
5-7 June 2021	Kuki News-Hangil Research	1001	48.2	16.9	7.1	3.1	2.3	-	-	-	-	22.4	31.3
5-6 June 2021	Kyongbuk Maeil Newspaper & Every News-Every Media	1000	44.9	20.1	6.2	3.6	2.7	-	-	-	-	22.5	24.8
5 June 2021	Money Today-PNR	1002	41.3	20.6	9.7	3.3	3.2	-	-	-	-	21.9	20.7
1-2 June 2021	MBN-R&Search	1044	46.7	16.8	6.7	3.7	2.7	-	-	-	-	23.4	29.9
31 May-2 June 2021	NBS	1000	36	12	4	2	1	-	-	-	-	44	24
30 May-1 June 2021	Ilyo News-Jowon C&I	1003	41.4	18.5	6.0	3.9	3.8	-	-	-	-	26.3	22.9
29-30 May 2021	Asia Business Daily-WinGKorea	1019	44.4	16.5	7.5	1.9	1.5	-	-	-	-	28.1	27.9
28-29 May 2021	TBS-KSOI	1004	39.8	17.0	3.4	3.2	2.4	-	-	-	-	34.2	22.8
29 May 2021	Money Today-PNR	1004	40.7	19.5	7.2	4.2	3.1	-	-	-	-	25.3	21.2
28 May 2021	Kukinews-Hangil Research	1010	42.6	17.8	7.7	4.6	4.3	-	-	-	-	22.9	24.8
24-25 May 2021	Dailian-R&Search	1035	30.2	15.6	5.4	3.4	1.2	2.0	2.3	2.2	-	37.6	14.6
22-23 May 2021	JTBC-Realmeter	1013	30.3	18.4	9.5	2.9	2.9	3.1	4.1	1.3	1.9	25.5	11.9
22 May 2021	Money Today-PNR	1008	26.8	19.9	9.5	3.2	3.6	5.2	3.2	1.8	-	26.9	6.9
22 May 2021	Kukinews-Hangil Research	1000	30.1	17.4	9.3	3.7	2.8	5.0	4.9	3.3	-	23.6	12.7

=== Pre-nomination ===
Fieldwork date	Polling firm	Sample size	Na	Lee	Joo	Kim W	Kim MS	Hong	Cho KT	Kim EH	Kwon	Cho HJ	Shin	Yoon	Kim SY	Other	None	Don't know	Lead
17-19 May 2021	NBS	1000	16	19	7	4	-	4	2	2	-	0	1	1	-	2	32	11	3
15-16 May 2021	Asia Business Daily-WinGKorea	1019	16.5	17.7	10.4	8.2	-	4.6	3.1	3.2	1.7	1.8	2.3	1.6	1.4	3.3	16.6	7.6	1.2
14 May 2021	Money Today-PNR	1005	15.5	20.4	12.2	8.4	-	4.3	4.3	3.5	2.7	2.7	1.8	1.6	-	1.9	16.6	4.1	4.9
8-11 May 2021	Kukinews-Hangil Research	1010	15.9	13.1	7.5	6.1	-	5.5	2.5	-	2.2	2.1	-	2.1	-	-	-	43.1	2.8
8 May 2021	Money Today	1003	18.5	13.9	11.9	8.2	-	5.1	4.4	-	3.1	2.0	-	1.7	-	2.5	17.6	11.1	5.6
3 May 2021	Money Today	1001	18.0	-	13.4	7.3	-	6.3	4.9	-	4.2	3.2	-	2.5	-	7.9	23.7	8.6	6.1
18 April 2021	People Networks	1010	-	-	16.6	11.3	10.2	6.6	8.0	-	-	-	-	2.1	-	10.2	26.4	8.7	5.3

== Results ==
Turnout was 45.36%, the highest since 2011 (including the predecessor Grand National Party).

Lee Jun-seok received the highest votes in the opinion polling (58.76%) and was elected the new president with total 93,392 votes (43.81%). Na Kyung-won came behind of Lee with 79,161 votes (37.13%), although she received the highest votes among the electoral college, which is 61,077 votes (40.93%).

=== President ===
Full result
Candidate	Electoral college	Opinion polling	Total
Lee Jun-seok	55,820 (37.41%)	58.76%	93,392 (43.81%)
Na Kyung-won	61,077 (40.93%)	28.27%	79,151 (37.13%)
Joo Ho-young	25,109 (16.82%)	7.47%	29,883 (14.02%)
Cho Kyoung-tae	4,347 (2.91%)	2.57%	5,988 (2.80%)
Hong Moon-pyo	2,841 (1.90%)	2.94%	4,721 (2.21%)

=== Vice Presidents ===
Full result
Candidate	Electoral college	Opinion polling	Total	Results
Jo Soo-jin	62,497	30.26%	100,253	Elected
Bae Hyun-jin	58,763	26.72%	92,102	Elected
Kim Jae-won	50,571	9.55%	62,487	Elected
Jung Mi-kyung	32,638	9.58%	44,591	Elected
Cho Hae-jin	25,409	8.38%	35,859	Not elected
Lee Young	21,170	4.76%	27,110	Not elected
Do Tae-woo	16,622	3.75%	21,295	Not elected
Won Young-sup	11,265	2.82%	14,784	Not elected
Cho Dae-won	8,559	3.42%	12,827	Not elected
Cheon Kang-jung	3,633	0.77%	4,588	Not elected

==== Vice President (representing youths) ====
Full result
Candidate	Electoral college	Opinion polling	Total
Kim Yong-tae	41,763	38.02%	65,084
Lee Yong	27,697	30.31%	46,285
Hong Jong-ki	31,156	13.49%	39,431
Ham Seul-ong	26,757	9.08%	32,323
Kang Tae-rin	15,748	9.11%	21,336

== See also ==
- 2019 Liberty Korea Party leadership election
- 2021 Democratic Party of Korea leadership by-election
