= Kim Eun-hye (politician) =

South Korean journalist and politician (born 1971)

- 김은혜
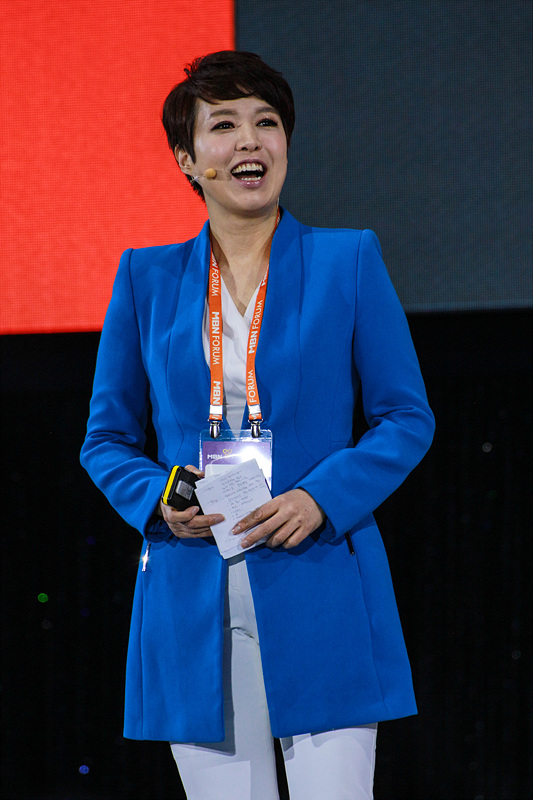
- Kim Eun-hye in 2017

Member of the National Assembly
- Incumbent
- Assumed office 30 May 2024
- Preceded by: Kim Byung-uk
- Constituency: Seongnam Bundang B (Gyeonggi)
- In office 30 May 2020 – 29 April 2022
- Preceded by: Kim Byoung-kwan
- Succeeded by: Ahn Cheol-soo
- Constituency: Seongnam Bundang A (Gyeonggi)

Personal details
- Born: 6 October 1971 (age 55) Seoul, South Korea
- Party: People Power
- Other political affiliations: UFP (2020)
- Spouse: Yoo Hyung-dong
- Children: Yoo Hee-joon
- Education: Ewha Womans University
- Occupation: Broadcaster, politician

Korean name
- Hangul: 김은혜
- Hanja: 金恩慧
- RR: Gim Eunhye
- MR: Kim Ŭnhye

Kim Eun-hye (Korean: 김은혜, born 6 October 1971) is a South Korean journalist, broadcaster and politician. A member of the People Power Party (PPP), she served as the Member of the National Assembly for Bundang A constituency from 2020 to 2022.

Before joining politics, she was a newsreader at Munhwa Broadcasting Corporation (MBC) and Maeil Broadcasting Network (MBN). She is well known for revealing the actual reason for the Sampoong Department Store collapse in 1995 as poor construction.

== Career ==
She made her debut as a broadcaster at Munhwa Broadcasting Corporation (MBC) in 1993. During the early period of a broadcaster, she reported few notable cases, such as the Chijon family and the Sampoong Department Store collapse.

When the Sampoong Department Store was collapsed in 1995, she was informed through phone calls but declined all of them as she regarded them as "prank calls". After she found out that the tragedy was true, she headed to the scene, but broadcasters like her were prohibited from entering to the scene in order to avoid risks of collapse. She then borrowed a rescue worker uniform and entered into the scene, and found a paper out, which was the blueprint of the shopping centre. From this, she realised the actual reason of the tragedy, which was poor constructions.

She was the female newsreader of MBC Newsdesk from April 1999 until replaced by Kim Ju-ha in October 2000. Instead, she moved to MBC Morning News (now MBC News Today), but left the programme in order to study at Stanford University, United States. The plan was, however, postponed due to the September 11 attacks occurred shortly after she arrived in San Francisco. She was immediately ordered by MBC to head to Washington, D.C., but was delayed for a week as all flights were stopped. She became a correspondent in the capital of the United States. After returned to South Korea, she made a comeback to MBC News Today in 2004.

Following the 2007 election, Kim was appointed a deputy spokesperson of the Blue House in February 2008 until being promoted to the 2nd Spokesperson of the Office of the President in 2009. She then worked at KT Corporation from December 2010 to 2014. In September 2014, she made a comeback through MBN News & Issue, then moved to MBN Sunday Issues (now MBN Issue Special) in September 2019.

== Political career ==
Kim joined the United Future Party (UFP; People Power Party since September 2020) in early 2020, and became the candidate for Bundang 1st constituency at the 2020 election. She contested against the then incumbent MP Kim Byoung-gwan from the ruling Democratic Party.

Despite a crushing defeat of the UFP, Kim Eun-hye was elected with a margin of 1,128 votes. Analyses have shown that the outcome was due to property and housing issues. One of her manifestos was to cancel the unpopular public housing project in Seohyeon-1-dong.

On 1 June 2020, Kim was appointed a spokesperson of the UFP, under the interim President Kim Chong-in. She resigned on 12 April 2021.

=== 2021 leadership election ===
On 14 May 2021, Kim announced her campaign to become the President of the People Power Party (PPP) that was vacant following the resignation of Hwang Kyo-ahn. She indicated that the party needs a "revolutionary change" to win the 2022 presidential election. She promised to adopt a youth quota system for the party.

On 23 May, she confirmed that she has no intention to form an alliance with other candidates, including Lee Jun-seok and Kim Woong, who are also considered "fresh" candidates.

She was eliminated on 28 May.

=== After leadership bid ===
As a prominent speaker of the People Power Party (PPP) and one of the only members of her party representing a constituency in Gyeonggi, she has been speculated as a potential candidate for the Governor of Gyeonggi.

After Yoon Suk-yeol was elected as the next president, Kim was appointed as the Spokeswoman for the 20th Presidential Inaugural Committee. However, she quit on 5 April to run for the gubernatorial race of Gyeonggi, which is tipped as the most crucial race in local elections in June.

She won PPP preselection for Gyeonggi governorship on 22 April 2022, defeating Yoo Seong-min. Kim resigned in her National Assembly seat on 28 April to run for the governorship.

== Personal life ==
Kim Eun-hye was born in Seoul, to the former Chairman of Bokwang Printing Kim Baek-soo (died in 2008). She undertook her secondary education at Chungshin Girls' High School before attending Ewha Womans University where she studied mass communication.

Initially, she wanted to be a flautist, but changed her mind after her flute teacher was arrested for bribery.

She was married to an international lawyer at Kim & Chang Yoo Hyung-dong, at Hyatt Seoul on 19 March 2006. Born in Egypt and was grown in the United States, he is a cousin to Yoo Jeong-ah, a former newsreader at Korean Broadcasting System (KBS). They met each other in May 2005 and were in a relationship till the marriage. They have a son, named Yoo Hee-joon (born 5 March 2007).

== Election results ==
=== General elections ===
Year	Elections	Constituency	Political party	Votes (%)	Remarks
2020	21st National Assembly General Election	Seongnam Bundang A (Gyeonggi)	UFP	78,134 (50.06%)	Won
2024	22nd National Assembly General Election	Seongnam Bundang B (Gyeonggi)	PPP	69,259 (51.13%)	Won

=== Local elections ===
==== Governor of Gyeonggi ====
Year	Elections	Constituency	Political party	Votes (%)	Remarks
2022	8th Iocal Election	Gyeonggi (Governoral Elections)	PPP	2,818,680 (48.91%)	Defeated (2nd)
