= 강봉균 =

강봉균 may refer to individuals:

- Kaang Bong-Kiun (born 1961), professor of neuroscience
- Kang Bong-kyun (1943 – 2017), South Korean economist and politician
