= Kim Moo-sung =

South Korean politician (born 1951)

- 김무성
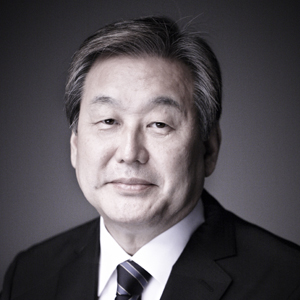
- Kim in 2016

Chairman of the Saenuri Party
- In office 14 July 2014 – 14 April 2016
- Preceded by: Hwang Woo-yea; Lee Wan-koo (Interim)
- Succeeded by: Won Yoo-chul (acting); Chung Jin-suk (acting); Kim Hee-ok (interim); Lee Jung-hyun

Member of the National Assembly
- In office 25 April 2013 – 30 May 2020
- Preceded by: Lee Jae-kyun
- Succeeded by: Hwangbo Seung-hee
- Constituency: Yeongdo (Busan, 2013–2016); Jung–Yeongdo (Busan, 2016–2020)
- In office 30 May 1996 – 29 May 2012
- Preceded by: Yoo Heung-soo
- Succeeded by: Suh Yong-kyo
- Constituency: Nam B (Busan, 1996–2000, 2004–2012); Nam (Busan, 2000–2004)

Personal details
- Born: 20 September 1951 (age 75) Busan, South Korea
- Party: People Power
- Other political affiliations: New Democratic Party (1978–1980); Independent (1980–1985, 1987, 2008, 2016–2017, 2017); New Korean Democratic Party (1985–1987); Reunification Democratic Party (1987–1990); Democratic Liberal Party (1990–1995); New Korea Party (1995–1997); Grand National Party (1997–2008, 2008–2012); Saenuri Party (2012–2016); Bareun Party (2016–2017); Liberty Korea Party (2017–2020); United Future Party (2020)
- Education: Hanyang University
- Occupation: Politician

Korean name
- Hangul: 김무성
- Hanja: 金武星
- RR: Gim Museong
- MR: Kim Musŏng

Kim Moo-sung (Korean: 김무성; born 20 September 1951) is a South Korean politician as a member of the People Power Party. He was previously the Saenuri Party leader from 2014 to 2016.

== Education ==
Kim graduated from Joongdong High School in Seoul in 1970. He graduated from Hanyang University in 1976, majoring in business administration. He also took courses on public policy in Korea University in 1999.

Kim received honorary doctorate degrees from the following institutions: Doctor of Policy from Pukyong National University (2003), Doctor of Public Administration from Korea Maritime and Ocean University (2006) and Honorary Doctor of Political Science from Dongguk University (2015).

== Political career ==
Kim was first elected to the National Assembly representing the Nam District of Busan in 1996 as a member of the then-ruling New Korea Party. He was subsequently elected three more times from the same district and in 2008 was forced to run as an independent after losing renomination from his own party. He again failed to win renomination for the same constituency in 2012 and temporarily left politics between 2012 and 2013. He ran as the Saenuri Party candidate in a by-election held in Yeongdo District, Busan, and won his fifth term in the National Assembly in 2013. In 2014, he was elected leader of the ruling Saenuri Party. However, he resigned in April 2016 after the defeat of Saenuri Party in the National Assembly.

=== Potential candidacy for presidency ===
In a 2015 interview, Kim said he was "not yet qualified to be president". In November 2016, he suspended his presidential campaign process and declared that he would join the impeachment process against President Park Geun-hye.

== Controversy and in popular media ==
=== "Charcoal" skin color remarks ===
Kim faced criticism for comparing the skin color of a black Nigerian student to that of charcoal briquettes. He later apologized to the Yeungnam University student on 18 December 2015.

=== "No look pass" ===
Kim went viral both in Korea and abroad after he was filmed at an airport arrival area. He slid over a bright light green suitcase manner to his assistant without having looked over where he was passing the suitcase off to, much like the eponymous move used in basketball. This prompted him to be featured on international media outlets, as well as criticized by some as looking elitist and condescending.

=== Family during Japanese Occupation ===
During World War II, Kim's father was a collaborator who urged Koreans to make donations and encouraged youths to enlist in the army to support Japan's war efforts.

== Election results ==
Year	Elections	Constituency	Political party	Votes (%)	Results
1988	13th National Assembly General Election	National (15th)	RDP	4,680,175 (23.83%)	Not Elected
1992	14th National Assembly General Election	National (50th)	DLP	7,923,718 (38.49%)	Not Elected
1996	15th National Assembly General Election	Nam B (Busan)	NKP	38,970 (62.58%)	Won
2000	16th National Assembly General Election	Nam (Busan)	GNP	75,215 (66.93%)	Won
2004	17th National Assembly General Election	Nam B (Busan)	GNP	38,826 (54.88%)	Won
2008	18th National Assembly General Election	Nam B (Busan)	Independent	26,265 (49.69%)	Won
2013	2013 By-election	Yeongdo (Busan)	Saenuri	27,981 (65.72%)	Won
2016	20th National Assembly General Election	Jung–Yeongdo (Busan)	Saenuri	43,447 (55.80%)	Won
