= Kim Yong-tae =

Kim Yong-tae may refer to:

- Kim Yong-tae (footballer)
- Kim Yong-tae (politician)

== See also ==
- Kim Yong-dae (disambiguation)
