= Cho Kyoung-tae =

South Korean politician

Cho Kyoung-tae MP
- 조경태
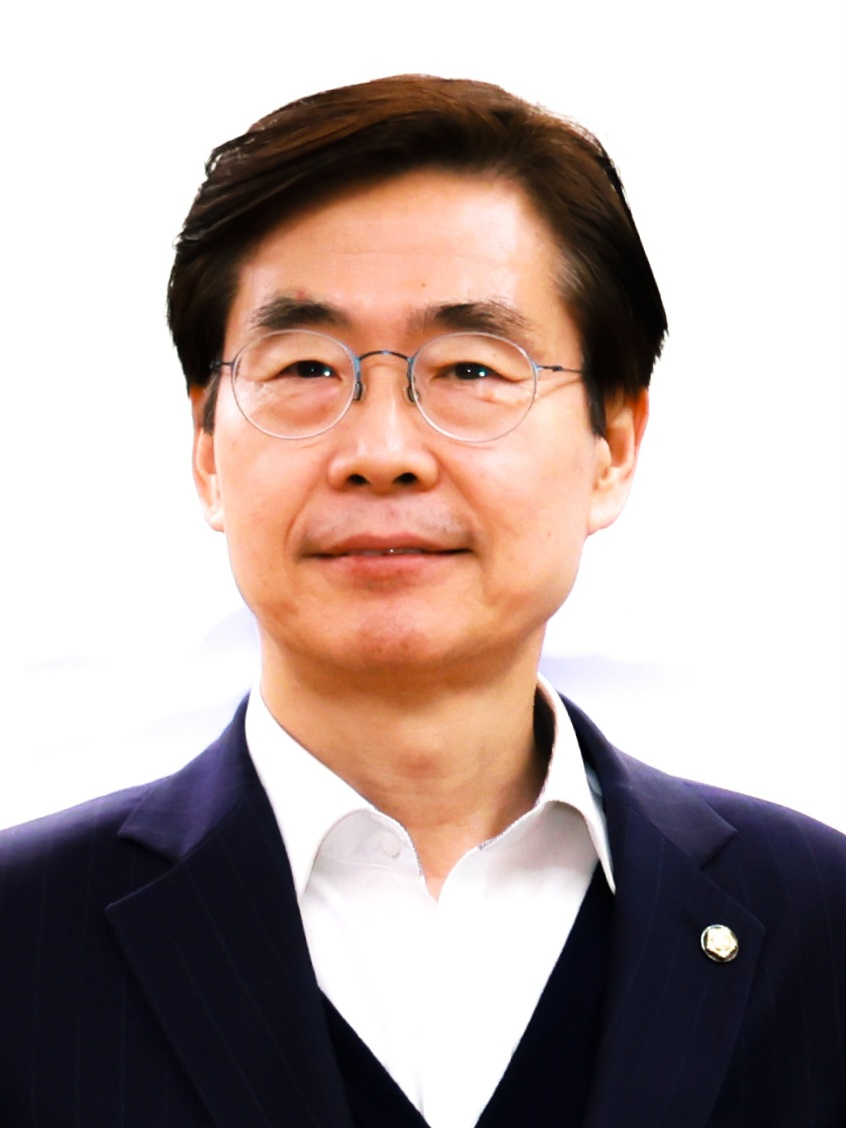
- Cho in 2023

Member of the National Assembly for Saha B (Busan)
- Incumbent
- Assumed office 30 May 2004
- Preceded by: Park Jong-woong

Personal details
- Born: 10 January 1968 (age 58) Busan, South Korea
- Party: People Power
- Other political affiliations: RDP (1988-1990); Democratic (1990) (1990-1991); Democratic (1991) (1991-1995); UDP/Democratic (1996) (1995-1997); GNP (1997–2000); MDP (2000–2003); Uri (2003–2007); GUDNP (2007–2008); UDP/Democratic (2008) (2008–2011); DUP/Democratic (2013) (2011–2014); NPAD/Democratic (2015) (2014–2015); Saenuri/LKP (2015–2020); UFP (2020)
- Education: Pusan National University

Korean name
- Hangul: 조경태
- Hanja: 趙慶泰
- RR: Jo Gyeongtae
- MR: Cho Kyŏngt'ae

Cho Kyoung-tae (Korean: 조경태, born 10 January 1968) is a South Korean politician.

== Education ==
Cho graduated from Pusan National University with Ph.D. in civil engineering.

== Career ==
Cho has been elected to the National Assembly four consecutive times in Busan.

In August 2018, Cho spoke about Refugees on Jeju Island, that counterfeit refugees should be deported back to Yemen.

On 11 May 2021, Cho announced he would run in the PPP leadership election.

== Election results ==
| Year | Elections | Constituency | Political party | Votes (%) | Results |
|---|---|---|---|---|---|
| 1996 | 15th National Assembly General Election | Saha A (Busan) | UDP (1995) | 10,835 (15.51%) | Defeated |
| 2000 | 16th National Assembly General Election | Saha B (Busan) | MDP | 13,351 (17.50%) | Defeated |
| 2004 | 17th National Assembly General Election | Saha B (Busan) | Uri | 36,614 (39.13%) | Won |
| 2008 | 18th National Assembly General Election | Saha B (Busan) | UDP (2008) | 31,330 (44.89%) | Won |
| 2012 | 19th National Assembly General Election | Saha B (Busan) | DUP | 49,849 (58.17%) | Won |
| 2016 | 20th National Assembly General Election | Saha B (Busan) | Saenuri | 50,337 (59.65%) | Won |
| 2020 | 21st National Assembly General Election | Saha B (Busan) | UFP | 59,042 (58.79%) | Won |
| 2024 | 22nd National Assembly General Election | Saha B (Busan) | PPP | 46,855 (55.62%) | Won |

National Assembly of the Republic of Korea
| Preceded by Park Jong-woong | Member of the National Assembly for Saha 2nd 2004– | Succeeded by |
