= Yun Hee-suk =

South Korean politician (born 1970)

- 윤희숙
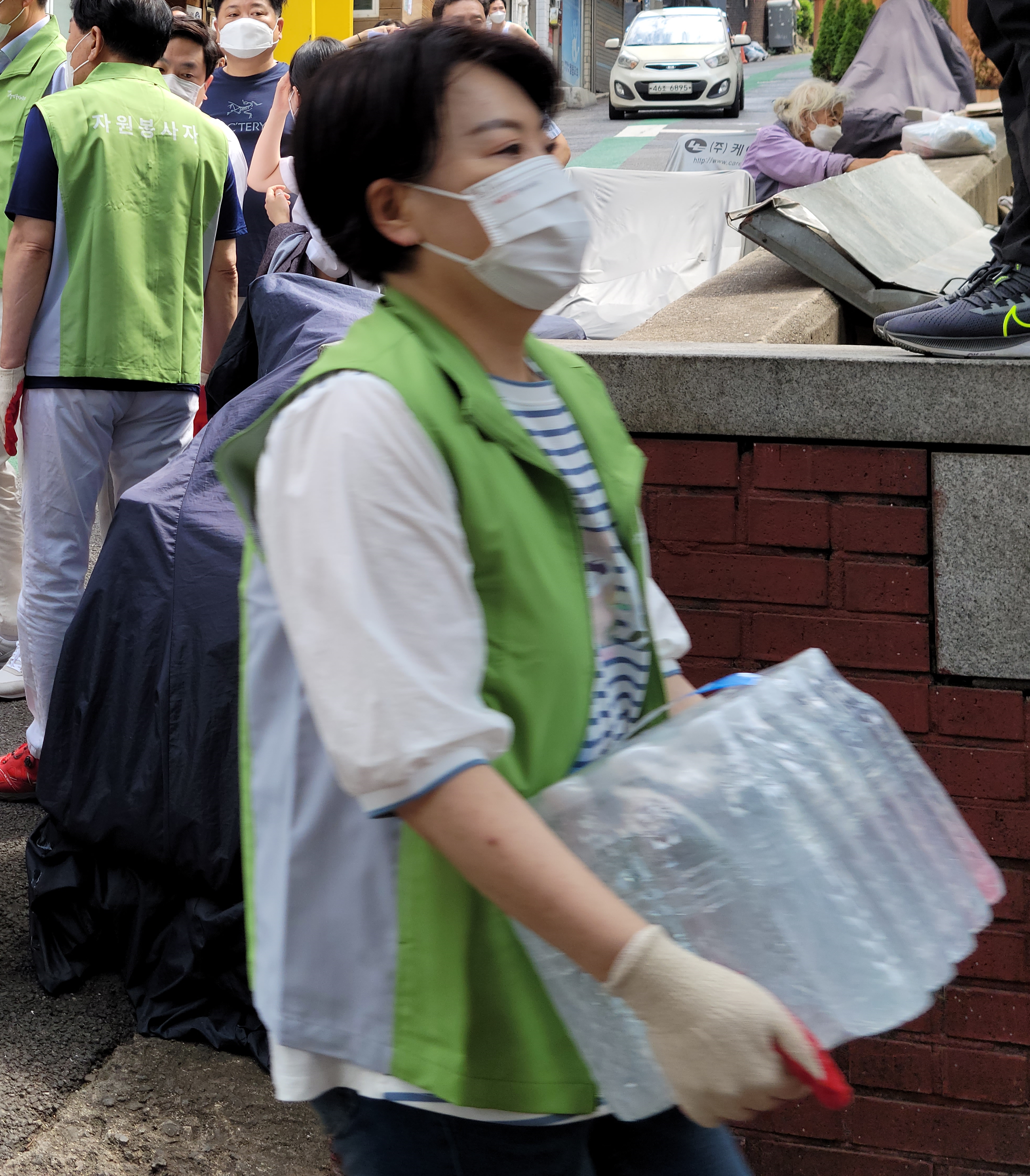

Member of the National Assembly
- In office 30 May 2020 – 13 September 2021
- Preceded by: Lee Hye-hoon
- Succeeded by: Cho Eun-hee
- Constituency: Seocho A (Seoul)

Personal details
- Born: 7 February 1970 (age 56) Seoul, South Korea
- Party: People Power
- Other political affiliations: UFP (2020)
- Education: Seoul National University; Columbia University
- Occupation: Economist, politician

Korean name
- Hangul: 윤희숙
- Hanja: 尹喜淑
- RR: Yun Huisuk
- MR: Yun Hŭisuk

Yun Hee-suk (Korean: 윤희숙, born 7 February 1970) is a South Korean economist and politician. She was the Member of the National Assembly for Seoul Seocho A constituency from 2020 to 2021.

== Education ==
She holds a bachelor's and a master's degree in economics from Seoul National University. She had also obtained a doctorate in economics at Columbia University.

== Career ==
Prior to entering politics, Yun worked as a researcher and a professor at the Korea Development Institute (KDI), specialising labour, finance, income, welfare and middle class issues. Within the KDI, she also served as the Head of Department of Finance and Welfare Policy Research. She was also one of few women promoted from doctor to department head at the KDI. During this period, she harshly criticised the economic policy of the President Moon Jae-in.

Prior to the 2020 election, Yun was brought into the newly formed conservative United Future Party (UFP). She was then selected the UFP candidate for Seocho A constituency, replacing the incumbent Lee Hye-hoon who had moved to Dongdaemun 2nd constituency. In the election on 15 April, she received 62.60%, defeating the ruling Democratic candidate Lee Jung-keun.

On 30 July, she delivered a speech at the National Assembly Proceeding Hall, known as "I'm a lessee." During the speech, she criticised the ruling Democratic Party for the newly passed 3 Rental Acts. This speech was praised by another UFP MPs i.e. Hwangbo Seung-hee and Park Soo-young. On 6 August, Realmeter analysed that the speech helped the UFP to gain more supports.

She was widely considered a potential candidate for the 2021 leadership election.

== Political positions ==
=== Economy ===
Yun is economically liberal. She is harshly critical towards the President Moon Jae-in, accusing his economic policy as "populism" since a researcher of the KDI. This gave her a nickname "Populism Fighter" (포퓰리즘 파이터).

The main policies that she is criticising are minimum wage increase, 52-hour workweek and real estate policies. As an example, for the minimum wage, she cited that while Japan had increased 3% per year during a decade, South Korea has increased 30% within 2 years, in which she mentioned that labour forces like part-time and/or temporary workers will be damaged. She also accused that Moon's economic policy will lead the country to be like Venezuela or Argentina.

She has a sceptical view towards Keynesian economic policies adopted by the President Moon, mentioning that the policy is actually "impossible and nonsense". She also added that South Korea needs a leadership like Margaret Thatcher.

=== Education ===
During a parliamentary speech on 30 July 2020, Yun criticised the education policy of Moon's government. She cited an example of her elder sister who had already given up for mathematics during her school life. She believes that this kind of problem was occurred due to the standardised education system. In order to overcome this issue, she had suggested an idea, which is that an artificial intelligence (AI) provides exercises that are suitable for each student. In fact, this idea was once applied at the Introduction to Probability and Statistics subject at the KDI and no one failed at the subject.

She also analysed that the current South Korean education system has failed to innovate due to high restrictions towards e-learning and strong objections from teachers and lecturers.

== Works ==
- The Betrayal of Policies (2020)

== Election results ==
Year	Elections	Constituency	Political party	Votes (%)	Remarks
2020	21st National Assembly General Election	Seocho A (Seoul)	UFP	72,896 (62.60%)	Won
2024	22nd National Assembly General Election	Jung–Seongdong A (Seoul)	PPP	58,726 (47.38%)	Defeated (2nd)
