= Seongnam Bundang A =

Constituency in Gyeonggi, South Korea

- Single-member constituency for the National Assembly
- Location of the constituency
- District(s): Bundang District (part)
- Region: Gyeonggi
- Electorate: 214,158 (2024)

Current constituency
- Created: 2000
- Seats: 1
- Party: People Power Party
- Member: Ahn Cheol-soo
- Created from: Seongnam Bundang

Seongnam Bundang A (Korean: 성남시 분당구 갑) is a constituency of the National Assembly of South Korea. The constituency consists of portions of Bundang District, Seongnam. As of 2024, 214,158 eligible voters were registered in the constituency. The constituency was created in 2000 from the Seongnam Bundang constituency.

== History ==
Since its creation in 2000, Seongnam Bundang A has been considered a conservative stronghold as it has consistently voted for conservative party candidates except for in the 2016 South Korean legislative election.

Ko Heung-gil of the conservative Grand National Party was the first member to represent the constituency in the National Assembly. He won re-election in 2004 and 2008, but stood down in 2012 to serve as the Minister for Special Affairs under President Lee Myung-bak. He was succeeded by Lee Jong-hoon of the conservative Saenuri Party. Lee, a member of the pro-Yoo Seong-min faction of the Saenuri Party, was not nominated as the party's candidate for Seongnam Bundang A in 2016, Kwon Hyouk-se, a pro-Park Geun-hye candidate was nominated instead. Kwon lost to the liberal Democratic Party's Kim Byoung-gwan, marking the first time a candidate from a liberal party won in Seongnam Bundang A. However, Kim barely lost his bid for re-election in 2020 to Kim Eun-hye of the conservative United Future Party, with only 1,128 votes separating the two candidates. Kim Eun-hye resigned as the constituency's member of the National Assembly on April 28, 2022 to run as the People Power Party candidate for Governor of Gyeonggi Province in the 2022 South Korean local elections. A by-election was held in June 2022 between Kim Byoung-gwan of the Democratic Party and two-time presidential candidate Ahn Cheol-soo of the People Power Party. Ahn won the election in a landslide, securing 62.5% of the vote.

== Boundaries ==
The constituency encompasses the neighborhoods of Seohyeon-dong, Imae-dong, Yatap-dong, Pangyo-dong, Sampyeong-dong, Unjung-dong, and Baekhyeon-dong.

== List of members of the National Assembly ==
Election	Member	Party	Dates	Notes
2000	Ko Heung-gil	Grand National	2000–2012	Minister for Special Affairs (2012–2013)
2004	Ko Heung-gil	Grand National	2000–2012	Minister for Special Affairs (2012–2013)
2008	Ko Heung-gil	Grand National	2000–2012	Minister for Special Affairs (2012–2013)
2012	Lee Jong-hoon	Saenuri	2012–2016	
2016	Kim Byoung-gwan	Democratic	2016–2020	Chief Secretary to the Speaker of the National Assembly (2021–2022)
2020	Kim Eun-hye	United Future	2020–2022	presidential 2 spokesperson (2009–2010); Resigned on April 28, 2022 to run for Governor of Gyeonggi Province; Senior Secretary to Public Relations (2022–2023)
2022 by-election	Ahn Cheol-soo	People Power	2022–present	Co-leader New Politics Alliance for Democracy (2014); Co-leader of the People's Party (2016) (2016); Leader of the People's Party (2016) (2016–2017); Leader of the People's Party (2020) (2020–2022)
2024	Ahn Cheol-soo	People Power	2022–present	Co-leader New Politics Alliance for Democracy (2014); Co-leader of the People's Party (2016) (2016); Leader of the People's Party (2016) (2016–2017); Leader of the People's Party (2020) (2020–2022)

== Election results ==
=== 2024 ===
Legislative election 2024: Seongnam Bundang A
Party	Candidate	Votes	%	±%
People Power	Ahn Cheol-soo	87,315	53.27	▼9.23
Democratic	Lee Kwang-jae	76,578	46.72	▲9.23
Rejected ballots		1,274	–	
Turnout		165,167	77.12	▲13.32
Registered electors		214,158		
People Power hold		Swing		

=== 2022 by-election ===
June 2022 by-election: Seongnam Bundang A
Party	Candidate	Votes	%	±%
People Power	Ahn Cheol-soo	83,747	62.50	+12.44
Democratic	Kim Byoung-gwan	50,235	37.49	−11.85
Rejected ballots		2,534	–	
Turnout		136,516	63.80	−11.84
Registered electors		213,963		
People Power hold		Swing		

=== 2020 ===
Legislative election 2020: Seongnam Bundang A
Party	Candidate	Votes	%	±%
United Future	Kim Eun-hye	78,134	50.06	+11.55
Democratic	Kim Byoung-gwan	77,006	49.34	+2.31
National Revolutionary	Woo Ju-young	911	0.58	new
Rejected ballots		1,368	–	
Turnout		157,419	75.64	+9.20
Registered electors		205,625		
United Future gain from Democratic		Swing		

=== 2016 ===
Legislative election 2016: Seongnam Bundang A
Party	Candidate	Votes	%	±%
Democratic	Kim Byoung-gwan	63,698	47.03	+3.29
Saenuri	Kwon Hyouk-se	52,160	38.51	−12.94
People	Yeom Oh-bong	19,577	14.45	new
Rejected ballots		1,198	–	
Turnout		136,633	66.44	+5.52
Registered electors		205,625		
Democratic gain from Saenuri		Swing		

=== 2012 ===
Legislative election 2012: Seongnam Bundang A
Party	Candidate	Votes	%	±%
Saenuri	Lee Jong-hoon	66,028	51.45	−13.28
Democratic United	Kim Chang-ho	56,133	43.74	+10.51
Independent	Kim Do-gyun	4,239	3.30	new
Liberty Forward Party	Hong Kwan-hui	1,916	1.49	new
Rejected ballots		589	–	
Turnout		128,905	60.92	+14.18
Registered electors		211,614		
Saenuri hold		Swing		

=== 2008 ===
Legislative election 2008: Seongnam Bundang A
Party	Candidate	Votes	%	±%
Grand National	Ko Heung-gil	46,396	64.73	+10.64
United Democratic	Lee Jae Myung	23,822	33.23	new
Family Party for Peace and Unity	Choi Jeong-hwan	1,455	2.03	new
Rejected ballots		817	–	
Turnout		72,490	46.74	−21.72
Registered electors		155,105		
Grand National hold		Swing		

=== 2004 ===
Legislative election 2004: Seongnam Bundang A
Party	Candidate	Votes	%	±%
Grand National	Ko Heung-gil	56,421	54.09	+2.25
Uri	Huh Un-na	42,362	40.61	new
Millennium Democratic	Kim Jong-woo	3,445	3.30	−38.16
Independent	Kang Jeong-gil	1,215	1.16	new
Independent	Jang Myeong-hwa	867	0.83	new
Rejected ballots		674	–	
Turnout		104,984	68.46	+5.32
Registered electors		153,353		
Grand National hold		Swing		

=== 2000 ===
Legislative election 2000: Seongnam Bundang A
Party	Candidate	Votes	%	±%
Grand National	Ko Heung-gil	44,857	51.84	–
Millennium Democratic	Kang Bong-kyun	35,881	41.46	–
United Liberal Democrats	Kang Dae-ki	3,764	4.35	–
Democratic People's	Yang Jae-heon	2,026	2.34	–
Rejected ballots		643	–	
Turnout		87,171	63.14	–
Registered electors		138,066		
Grand National win (new seat)				

== See also ==
- List of constituencies of the National Assembly of South Korea
