= Hwangbo Seung-hee =

South Korean politician (born 1976)

Hwangbo Seung-hee MP
- 황보승희
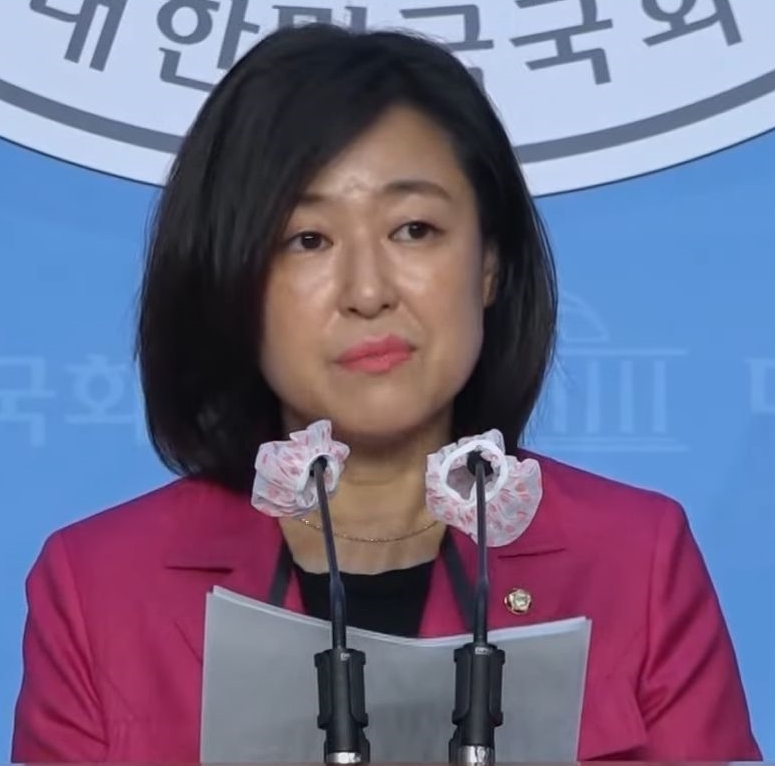
- Hwangbo Seung-hee

Member of the National Assembly
- In office 30 May 2020 – 30 May 2024
- Preceded by: Kim Moo-sung
- Succeeded by: Cho Seung-hwan
- Constituency: Jung–Yeongdo

Member of the Busan Metropolitan Council
- In office 12 April 2012 – 20 March 2018
- Preceded by: Ahn Sung-min
- Succeeded by: Goh Dae-young
- Constituency: Yeongdo 1st

Member of the Yeongdo District Council
- In office 6 June 2004 – March 2012
- Preceded by: Park Jang-je
- Succeeded by: Kim Chul-hoon
- Constituency: A

Personal details
- Born: 5 August 1976 (age 50) Yeongdo, Busan, South Korea
- Party: Liberal Unification Party (2024–present)
- Other political affiliations: GNP (2004–2012); Saenuri (2012–2017); LKP (2017–2020); UFP (2020); People Power (2020–2023)
- Spouse: Cho Sung-hwa
- Children: 2
- Education: Ewha Womans University
- Occupation: Politician

Hwangbo Seung-hee (Korean: 황보승희; born 5 August 1976) is a South Korean politician who served as the Youth Chief of the People Power Party (PPP) between 2020 and 2024. She is also the Member of the National Assembly for Central-Yeongdo since 2020. Prior to these, she was a member of the Yeongdo District Council and the Busan Metropolitan Council.

== Early life and education ==
Hwangbo was born in Yeongdo, Busan in 1976. Her father was from Guryongpo, Pohang. She is the eldest daughter of the one son and two daughters of her parents.

She attended Yeongdo Girls' High School before studying English at Ewha Womans University. She used to serve as the President of the Student Council during her secondary school life. Following the graduation, she worked at an English language tuition centre and a foreign company.

== Political career ==
Hwangbo Seung-hee (0:04) at a talk show of Lee Jun-seok in 2021

Hwangbo joined politics in December 1999 as a secretary to the then Yeongdo MP Kim Hyong-o, which she served for 8 months.

In 2004, Hwangbo joined protests against the impeachment of the then President Roh Moo-hyun. However, she joined the Grand National Party (GNP), which voted in favour of the impeachment. She said that she was willing to change the party. Shortly after this, she contested as the Member of the Yeongdo District Council for A constituency (including Yeongson 2-dong) at the 2004 by-elections. She was just 28 years old at that time, making her as the youngest councilor of the country. She was re-elected in 2006 and 2010, but resigned in 2012 in order to contest for Busan Metropolitan Council at the 2012 by-elections.

She stepped down as a Busan Metropolitan Councilor on 20 March 2018 in order to contest for the Yeongdo District mayorship at the 2018 local elections. Nevertheless, she was defeated by the Democratic candidate Kim Chul-hoon amid the high popularity of Moon Jae-in government and the public anger towards the Liberty Korea Party (LKP). The LKP faced crushing defeats in Busan, where its mayorship was also won by the Democratic candidate Oh Keo-don.

In the 2020 election, Hwangbo contested for Central-Yeongdo, after the then incumbent Kim Moo-sung decided to not seek re-election. She received 47,436 votes and defeated Kim Bi-o with a margin of 6,351 votes. She has also become the first female MP for the constituency.

On 6 December 2020, the People Power Party (PPP) officially established its youth-wing, named the Youth People Power Party (Youth PPP). Hwangbo was elected its new chairman.

She was considered a potential candidate for vice presidency of the PPP at the 2021 leadership election, but did not run. On 12 June, after Lee Jun-seok was elected party President, she was appointed Chief Spokesperson of the party.

On 19 June 2023, Hwangbo left the People Power Party over charges of illegal campaign contributions and issues surrounding her personal life. In the same statement, Hwangbo also announced that she will not be standing for reelection in the 2024 Parliamentary election

== Personal life ==
Hwangbo was married to Cho Sung-hwa; the couple has 2 children.

== Election results ==
=== General elections ===
Year	Constituency	Political party	Votes (%)	Remarks
2020	Central-Yeongdo	UFP	47,381 (51.86%)	Won

=== Local elections ===
==== Mayor of Yeongdo ====
Year	Political party	Votes (%)	Remarks
2018	LKP	24,355 (40.49%)	Defeated

==== Busan Metropolitan Council ====
Year	Constituency	Political party	Votes (%)	Remarks
2012	Yeongdo 1st	Saenuri	17,536 (58.47%)	Won
2014	Yeongdo 1st	Saenuri	20,449 (72.98%)	Won

==== Yeongdo District Council ====
Year	Constituency	Political party	Votes (%)	Remarks
2004	A	Independent	1,588 (47.8%)	Won
2006	A	GNP	4,072 (26.59%)	Won
2010	A	GNP	4,821 (32.14%)	Won
