= MBC News at 5 =

- Also known as: MBC 5시 뉴스
- Genre: News
- Country of origin: South Korea
- Original language: Korean

Production
- Camera setup: Multi-camera
- Running time: 10 minutes

Original release
- Network: MBC TV
- Release: 8 October 2012 – present

Related
- MBC News Today; MBC Life News; MBC Noon News; MBC News at 3 MBC Evening News; MBC Newsdesk; MBC News 24; MBC Weekend News

MBC News at 5 (Korean: MBC 5시 뉴스) is an early morning newscast broadcast of weekdays at 5:00 KST. Its anchored by Park Chang-Heon.
