= Korea Maritime and Ocean University =

National university in Busan, South Korea

Coordinates: 35°04′28″N 129°05′13″E

Korea Maritime & Ocean University
- 국립한국해양대학교
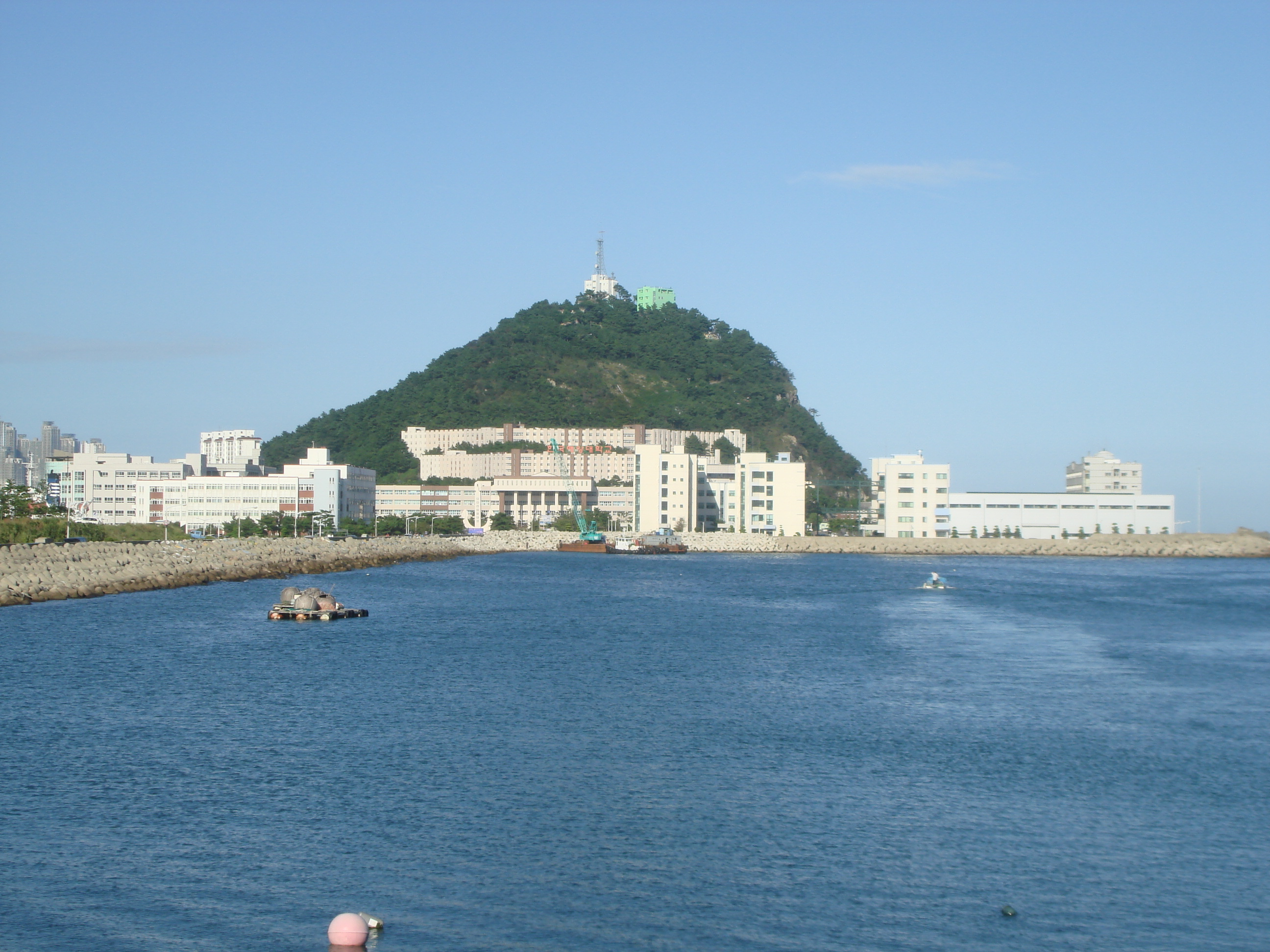
- Campus view
- Motto: 진리탐구•문화창조•인격도야; Pursue the truth, develop the culture, discipline oneself
- Type: National
- Established: November 5, 1945
- President: Ryoo Dong Keun (류동근)
- Faculty: 230
- Undergraduates: 8900
- Postgraduates: Source not available
- Location: Yeongdo-gu, Busan, South Korea
- Mascot: Black-tailed gull
- Website: www.kmou.ac.kr

Korean name
- Hangul: 한국해양대학교
- Hanja: 韓國海洋大學校
- RR: Hanguk haeyang daehakgyo
- MR: Han'guk haeyang taehakkyo

Korea Maritime & Ocean University is South Korea's most prestigious national university for maritime study, transportation science and engineering. It is located in Yeongdo-gu in Busan. The university is also known for having its whole campus located inside an island.

== History ==
The university was established in November 1945 after Korea had been liberated from Japanese occupation (World War II). Chinhae High Seamans School, a maritime institution with a majority of Korean students until the liberation of Korea, was re-established with Korean faculty and students under the leadership of Lee Si-hyung. The school became a national university immediately after its foundation, and was renamed Chinhae High Merchant Seamans School (진해고등상선학교).

After the Korean War it was merged with other similar institutions and moved to Busan. The name was changed to the National Maritime College (국립해양대학) in 1956.

In 1992, the college became a university with a graduate school, and was given its current name.

The university is one of the earliest and prestigious national post-secondary educational institutions in South Korea, and the only post-secondary institution that specializes in maritime sciences and engineering.

The university name was changed from "Korea Maritime University" to "Korea Maritime and Ocean University" on September 1, 2013.

The university name was changed from "Korea Maritime and Ocean University" to "Korea Maritime & Ocean University" on February 1, 2019.

== Academics ==
=== Undergraduate colleges ===
- Maritime Sciences
  - Maritime Transportation Science
  - Marine System Engineering
  - Navigation Science
  - Marine Engineering
  - Coast Guard Studies
  - Offshore Plant Management
  - Marine Information Technology
  - Global Maritime Studies
- Ocean Science and Technology
  - Naval Architecture and Ocean Systems Engineering
  - Ocean Engineering
  - Energy Resources Engineering
  - Architecture Ocean Space
  - Ocean Science
  - Marine Bio-science
  - Ocean Physical Education
- Engineering
  - Mechanical Engineering Logistics
  - Electrical and Electronics Engineering
  - Information Technology
  - Control and Automation Engineering
  - Radio Communication Engineering
  - Data Information
  - Environmental engineering
  - Civil Engineering
- International Studies
  - Shipping Management
  - Maritime Law
  - International Trade and Economics
  - International Commerce
  - Maritime Administration
  - English Language and Literature
  - East Asian Studies
  - European Studies

=== Korean Language Course ===
- 10 Weeks Course, 4 Semester a Year
- Korean Vocabulary and Grammar, Listening, Speaking, Reading, Writing.

=== Graduate schools ===
==== General Graduate Schools ====
- Engineering (18 departments)
- Natural Science (2 departments)
- Humanities and Social Studies (8 departments)

==== Professional Graduate Schools ====
- Graduate School of Maritime Industry Studies
- Ocean Science and Technology School
- Graduate School of Education

== See also ==
- List of national universities in South Korea
- List of universities and colleges in South Korea
- Education in Korea
