= MBC News Today =

- Also known as: MBC 뉴스투데이
- Genre: News
- Country of origin: South Korea
- Original language: Korean

Production
- Camera setup: Multi-camera
- Running time: 10 minutes

Original release
- Network: MBC TV
- Release: 1 April 2002 – present

Related
- MBC Life News; MBC Noon News; MBC News at 3 MBC News at 5 MBC Evening News; MBC Newsdesk; MBC News 24; MBC Weekend News

MBC News Today (Korean: MBC 뉴스투데이) is an early morning newscast broadcast of weekdays at 5:00 KST. Its anchored by Park Chang-Heon.

The news program's origin can be traced back to 1981 when in December it was first introduced as "MBC News Show". Since then, throughout the 80s, 90s, and into the early 2000s it had undergone numerous name changes and had other names like "MBC News Good Morning Korea" and "MBC Morning News" until it settled around the name "MBC News Today" in April 2002.

== Overview ==
This news program can be broken up into two parts; the first part showcases the main news story and a detailed look at the weather, while the second part has dedicated spots for economic news, entertainment-related topics, and a detailed look at other news.
