= Kang Bong-kyun =

Minister of Finance of South Korea
- In office May 1999 – January 2000
- President: Kim Dae-jung
- Preceded by: Lee Kyu-sung
- Succeeded by: Lee Hun-jai

Personal details
- Born: May 13, 1943 Zenrahoku Province (North Jeolla Province), Korea, Empire of Japan
- Died: January 31, 2017 (aged 74) Gangnam District, Seoul, South Korea

Kang Bong-kyun (Korean: 강봉균; May 13, 1943 – January 31, 2017) was a South Korean economist and politician who served as Minister of Finance from 1999 to 2000 during the height and aftermath of the Asian financial crisis. Kang was appointed Finance Minister by President Kim Dae-jung at a time when many other politicians and civil servants refused to take the cabinet position. The financial crisis stemmed from reckless borrowing and spending from the South Korean banking sector, as well as mismanagement by the chaebol, or South Korean business conglomerates.

Though Kang held the portfolio of Minister of Finance for less than a year, he is credited with guiding the South Korean economy through the most difficult period in the country's history. His work laid the foundation for the economy's eventual recovery and return to growth following the financial crisis. Under Kang, South Korea implemented higher standards governing the accounting practices of privately held and listed conglomerates and corporations. He also established harsher financial regulations.

Kang stepped down in 2000 after less than a year in office when he was appointed to lead the state-run Korea Development Institute.

Kang Bong-kyun died on Jan. 31, 2017, at age 74.

== Election results ==
Year	Elections	Constituency	Political party	Votes (%)	Results
2000	16th National Assembly General Election	Seongnam Bundang A (Gyeonggi)	MDP	35,881 (41.46%)	Defeated (2nd)
2002	2002 By-election	Gunsan (North Jeolla)	MDP	36,855 (58.24%)	Won
2004	17th National Assembly General Election	Gunsan (North Jeolla)	Uri	83,745 (78.28%)	Won
2008	18th National Assembly General Election	Gunsan (North Jeolla)	UDP	49,885 (52.79%)	Won
