= 2019 Liberty Korea Party leadership election =

Political party leadership election

- 27 February 2019
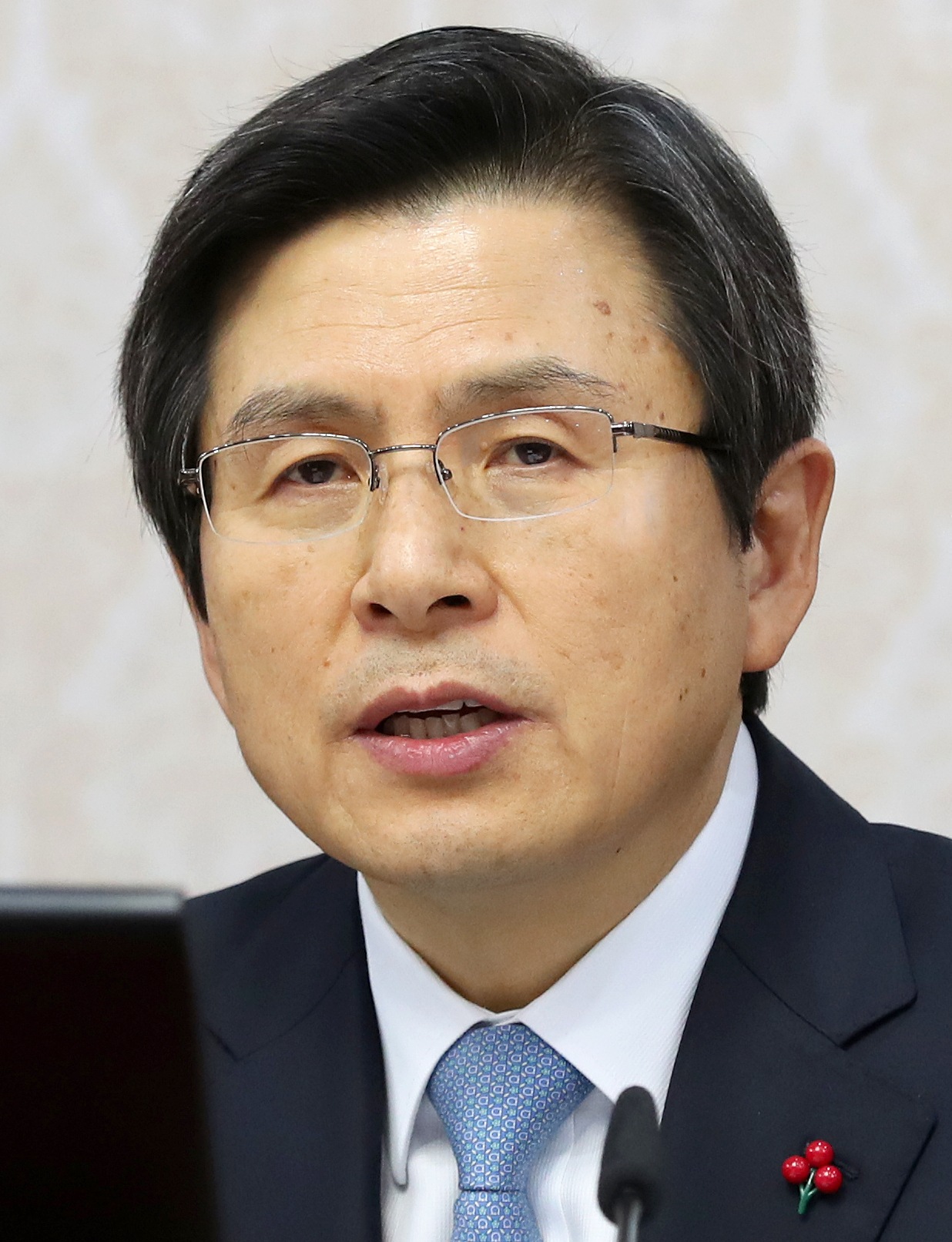

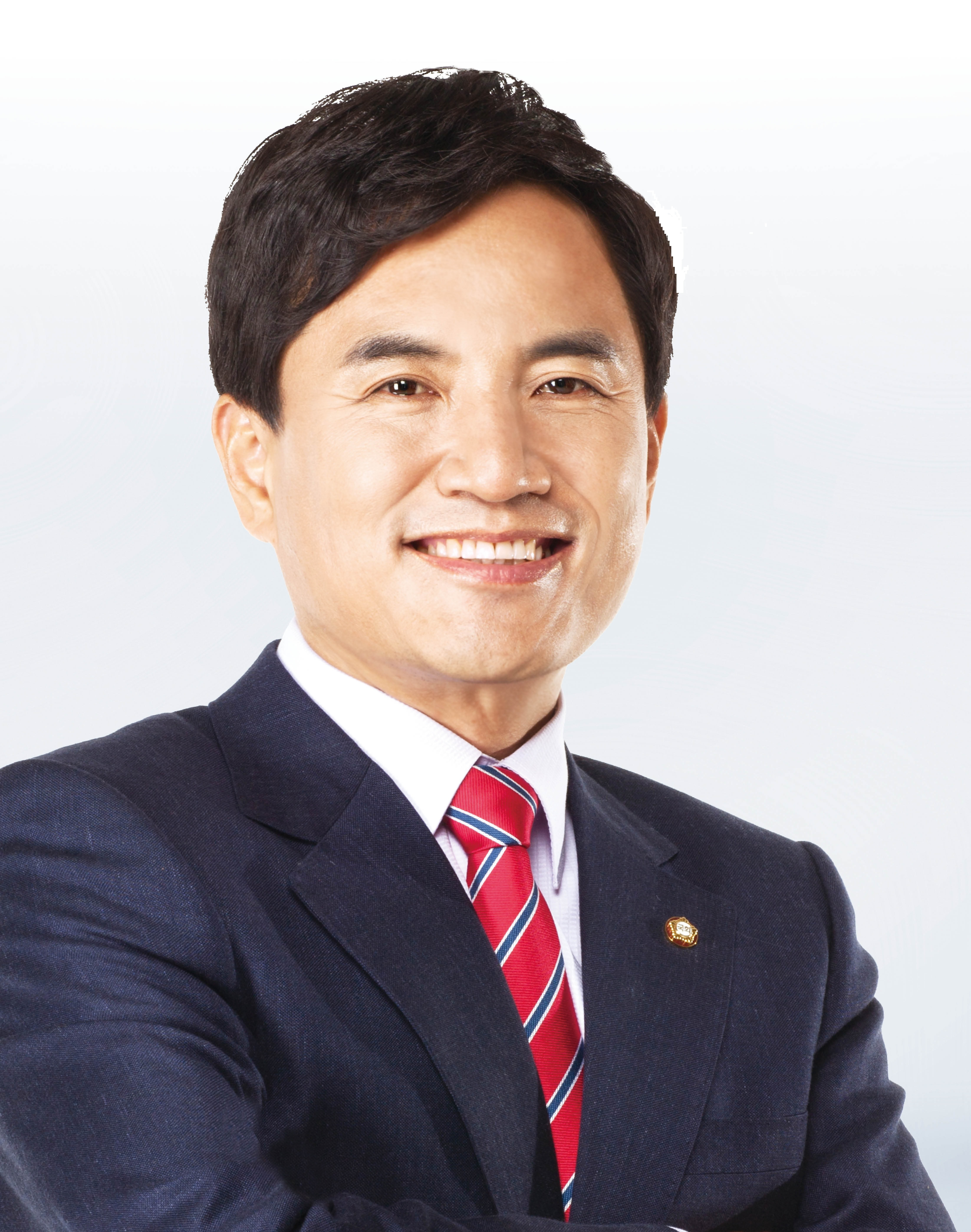
Candidate	Hwang Kyo-ahn	Oh Se-hoon	Kim Jin-tae
Delegate count	53,185	21,963	20,955
Opinion poll	15,527	20,689	4,969
Total	68,713	42,653	25,924
Leader before election
Kim Byong-joon (Interim)
Elected Leader
Hwang Kyo-ahn

The Liberty Korea Party held a leadership election on 27 February 2019 to elect the next leader of the Liberty Korea Party for a new 2-year term. It was an election to succeed an interim leader Kim Byong-joon, who has been in office for about seven months since the defeat of the Liberty Korea Party in the local elections held on 13 June 2018.

== Candidates ==
=== Running ===
- Hwang Kyo-ahn, former acting President of South Korea, former Prime Minister of South Korea, former Minister of Justice.
- Oh Se-hoon, former Mayor of Seoul, former member of the National Assembly.
- Kim Jin-tae, member of the National Assembly.

== Results ==
The ratio of the results by sector was 70% for delegates, 30% for opinion poll.

Final results
Candidate	Delegates	Opinion poll	Total points
Hwang Kyo-ahn	53,185 (55.3%)	37.7% (15,527 pts)	68,713 (50.1%)
Oh Se-hoon	21,963 (22.9%)	50.2% (20,689 pts)	42,653 (31.1%)
Kim Jin-tae	20,955 (21.8%)	12.1% (4,969 pts)	25,924 (18.8%)
Total	96,103	41,185 pts	137,290
