= Park Kyung-mee =

South Korean politician (born 1965)

- 박경미
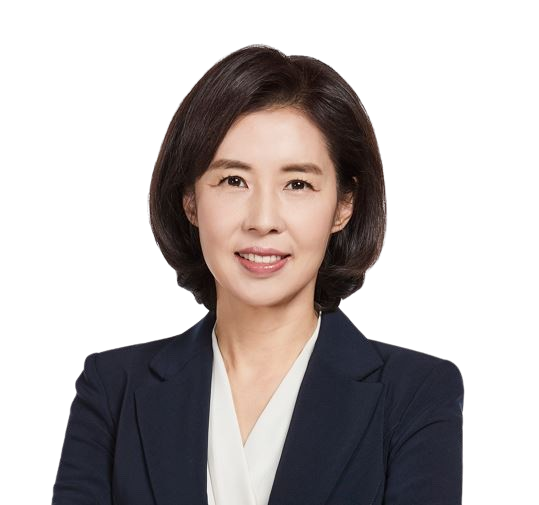

Spokesperson of the President
- In office 16 April 2021 – 9 May 2022
- President: Moon Jae-in
- Preceded by: Kang Min-seok
- Succeeded by: Kang In-sun

Secretary to the President for Education
- In office 29 May 2020 – 16 April 2021
- President: Moon Jae-in

Member of the National Assembly
- In office 30 May 2016 – 29 May 2020
- Constituency: Proportional representation

Personal details
- Born: 15 October 1965 (age 61)
- Party: Democratic
- Education: Seoul National University; University of Illinois at Urbana-Champaign

Park Kyung-mee (Korean: 박경미; Hanja: 朴炅美; born 15 October 1965) is a South Korean politician who served as the Spokesperson of President Moon Jae-in from 2021 to 2022. She was previously a professor of mathematics education at Hongik University and Chungbuk National University.

She is widely known to the public for her educational books on mathematics. After becoming a politician, she continues such effort through her YouTube channel. She also hosted a famous TV debate programme at MBC in 2014 becoming its first female host in its history which dates back to 1999.

In the 2016 general election, Park was the first candidate to be named for Democratic Party's proportional representation list. As a parliamentarian, she took numerous roles in her party such as its spokesperson, floor spokesperson and deputy floor leader—twice from 2017 to 2018 and again in 2019 to 2020.

After losing her re-election in 2020, Park was brought to the Office of the President as President Moon's secretary for education. In April 2021, she was promoted to his spokesperson.

Park holds three degrees—a bachelor in mathematics education from Seoul National University and a master's in mathematics and a doctorate in mathematics education from University of Illinois at Urbana–Champaign.

== Electoral history ==
Election	Year	District	Party affiliation	Votes	Percentage of votes	Results
20th National Assembly General Election	2016	Proportional representation (1st)	Democratic Party	6,069,744	25.54%	Won
21st National Assembly General Election	2020	Seoul Seocho B	Democratic Party	62,442	45.01%	Lost (2nd)
22nd National Assembly General Election	2024	Seoul Gangnam C	Democratic Party	32,908	32.75%	Lost (2nd)
