= Kim Woong =

South Korean politician (born 1970)

Kim Woong MP
- 김웅
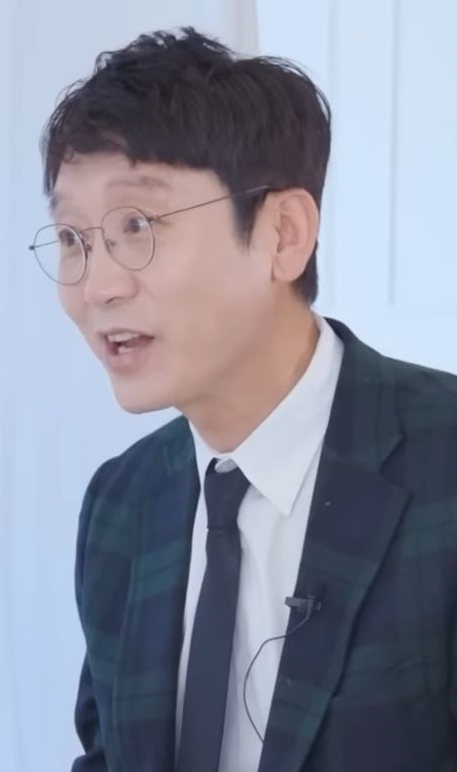
- Kim in 2024

Member of the National Assembly
- In office 30 May 2020 – 29 May 2024
- Preceded by: Park In-sook
- Succeeded by: Park Jeong-hun
- Constituency: Songpa A (Seoul)

Personal details
- Born: 5 May 1970 (age 56) Suncheon, South Jeolla, South Korea
- Party: People Power
- Other political affiliations: NCP (2020); UFP (2020)
- Education: Seoul National University
- Occupation: Prosecutor, politician

Kim Woong (Korean: 김웅, born 5 May 1970) is a South Korean prosecutor and politician. A member of the People Power Party (PPP), he is has served as the member of the National Assembly for Songpa's 1st constituency since 2020.

He joined politics as a member of the New Conservative Party (NCP), one of the predecessors to the PPP. Prior to entering politics, he was a vocal critic against the Moon Jae-in-led Democratic government's prosecution politics.

== Career ==
After qualifying for the bar in 1997, Kim started his career at Incheon District Prosecutor's Office in 2000.

He was appointed the Head of Future Planning and Criminal Policy at the Supreme Prosecutors' Office by the former Prosecutor General Mun Mu-il in July 2018. When the Moon Jae-in-led Democratic government was considering an adjustment of investigation power between the police and the prosecution — removing the jurisdiction over investigation from the prosecution while providing a right to terminate an investigation to the police, Moon Moo-il harshly criticised it as "undemocratic". Kim, who advocated Moon Moo-il's opinion, appeared on various media. After Moon Moo-il was replaced by Yoon Seok-youl, Kim was shunted off to a professor at the Institute of Justice. Not only him, but also some other critics.

On 13 January 2020, the National Assembly voted in favour of the amendment of the Criminal Procedure Act, and the Public Prosecutor's Office Act; the votes were boycotted by the main opposition Liberty Korea Party (LKP). Kim condemned the decision and submitted his resignation letter the following day. He urged the other prosecutors to "disobey those feudal orders, we are democratic citizens."

=== Political career ===
On 4 February 2020, Kim joined the New Conservative Party (NCP), a day after his resignation was accepted. He was the first person brought into the party prior to the 2020 election. The day, he said, "I'm good at cracking crooks. I will crack the crook cartel at the zenith of this Republic of Crooks." He also mentioned that he is willing to cooperate with the LKP.

The party was soon merged into the United Future Party (UFP). Kim requested the party that he wanted to contest for Songpa 1st constituency, rather than as a proportional representation. He was subsequently confirmed as the UFP candidate for the constituency, after the then incumbent Park In-sook decided to not seek for re-election. In the election, Kim successfully defeated the Democratic candidate Cho Jai-hee, although his party suffered a crushing defeat. Among the 10 Suncheon-born MPs, Kim is the sole MP from the opposition, whereas 9 others are from the government.

Following the outright victory of the People Power Party (PPP) in the 2021 by-elections, an opinion poll has shown that Kim is the 2nd most (11.3%) favourable candidate for the party presidency, next to Joo Ho-young (16.6%), prior to the upcoming party leadership election. Being a first-term MP, the outcome was described as "unexpected". Several sources have suggested possibilities he will form an alliance with Kim Chong-in and Lee Jun-seok. On 13 May, Kim officially made an announcement to run for the party leadership election. However, he was eliminated on 28 May.

== Personal life ==
Kim was born in Suncheon, South Jeolla in 1970. He attended Suncheon High School, and then studied politics at Seoul National University. He has an acquaintance with the former interim President of the Democratic Party Kim Tae-nyeon, who is a senior graduated from same high school.

He is the author of Diary of a Prosecutor, which was remade as a drama aired on JTBC.

He was exempted from the national service for undergoing a lobectomy.

He is a Roman Catholic.

== Election results ==
Year	Elections	Constituency	Political party	Votes (%)	Remarks
2020	21st National Assembly General Election	Songpa A (Seoul)	UFP	58,318 (51.20%)	Won
