= Bae Hyun-jin =

South Korean politician (born 1983)

Bae Hyun-jin MP
- 배현진
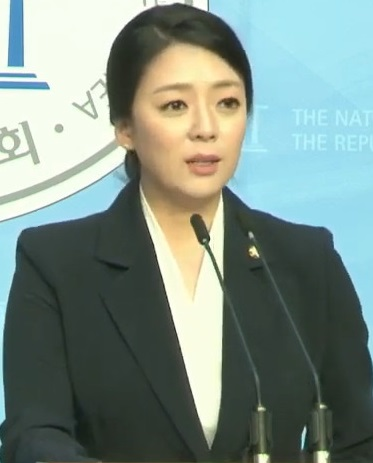

Member of the National Assembly
- Incumbent
- Assumed office 30 May 2020
- Preceded by: Choi Jae-sung
- Constituency: Songpa B (Seoul)

Personal details
- Born: 6 November 1983 (age 42) Yesan County, South Chungcheong Province, South Korea
- Party: People Power
- Other party: LKP (2018–2020)
- Education: Sookmyung Women's University; University of North Korean Studies
- Occupation: Broadcaster, politician

Bae Hyun-jin (Korean: 배현진; Hanja: 裵賢鎭; born 6 November 1983) is a South Korean broadcaster and politician. Prior to entering politics, she was the anchor for Munhwa Broadcasting Corporation (MBC), based in Seoul, South Korea. She is a member of the People Power Party.

== Career ==
Bae graduated from Sookmyung Women's University's Seoul campus with a degree in Communications and Korean Language and Literature after graduating from Dongsan High School in Ansan, South Korea. She won the silver prize at the Sookmyung Speech Contest and Speaker prize at the University Student Speech Contest in 2007 when she was a university student.

She also worked as a public relations model for Sookmyung Women's University during her school days. She was picked up by MBC in November 2008 among 1,926 competitors and began presenting news updates for the 5 p.m. MBC News in 2009.

Bae's career at MBC began in November 2009, presenting late news updates in MBC News programs and delivering error corrections in Korean in the MBC TV program "우리말 나들이" (roughly: "A Visit to Our Language"). She has presented one-off events such as the Guangzhou Asian Games as a newscaster in 2010.

She also was an MC for the MBC TV debate program, 100 Minute Debate (100분토론), and MBC radio program, Bae Hyun-jin's World City Travels (배현진의 세계도시여행), which features world-famous cities, in 2010. She sometimes appears in entertainment TV programs such as Three Wheels (세바퀴) and Infinite Challenge. She has been a main anchor with Kwon Jae-hong for MBC News Desk in the place of announcer Lee Jung-min since 8 April 2011. Although she has had a short career as an anchor, she responded calmly when Kwon Jae-hong abruptly left in the middle of a program because of a sudden headache 27 July 2011.

In January 2024, she was hit fifteen times on the back of the head with a brick by a 15-year-old male, because she allegedly turned down advances from politician Lee Jun-seok.

In January 2026, she was criticized for posting a photo of a Facebook user's child while arguing with that person on Facebook.

== Personal life ==
Recently she appeared in the TV show Infinite Challenge as a special guest to teach Korean, and she said she has never had a boyfriend. She enjoys yoga, reading and baseball as her hobbies.

== Electoral history ==
Election	Year	Position	Constituency	Party affiliation	Votes	Percentage of votes	Results
2018 By-election	2018	Member of the National Assembly	Songpa B (Seoul)	Liberty Korea Party	32,126	29.64%	Lost (2nd)
21st legislative elections	2020	Member of the National Assembly	Songpa B (Seoul)	United Future Party	72,072	50.46%	Won
22nd legislative elections	2024	Member of the National Assembly	Songpa B (Seoul)	People Power Party	77,531	57.20%	Won
