= Yeongdo District =

District of Busan, South Korea

Coordinates: 35°04′50″N 129°03′50″E

Yeongdo
- Autonomous District
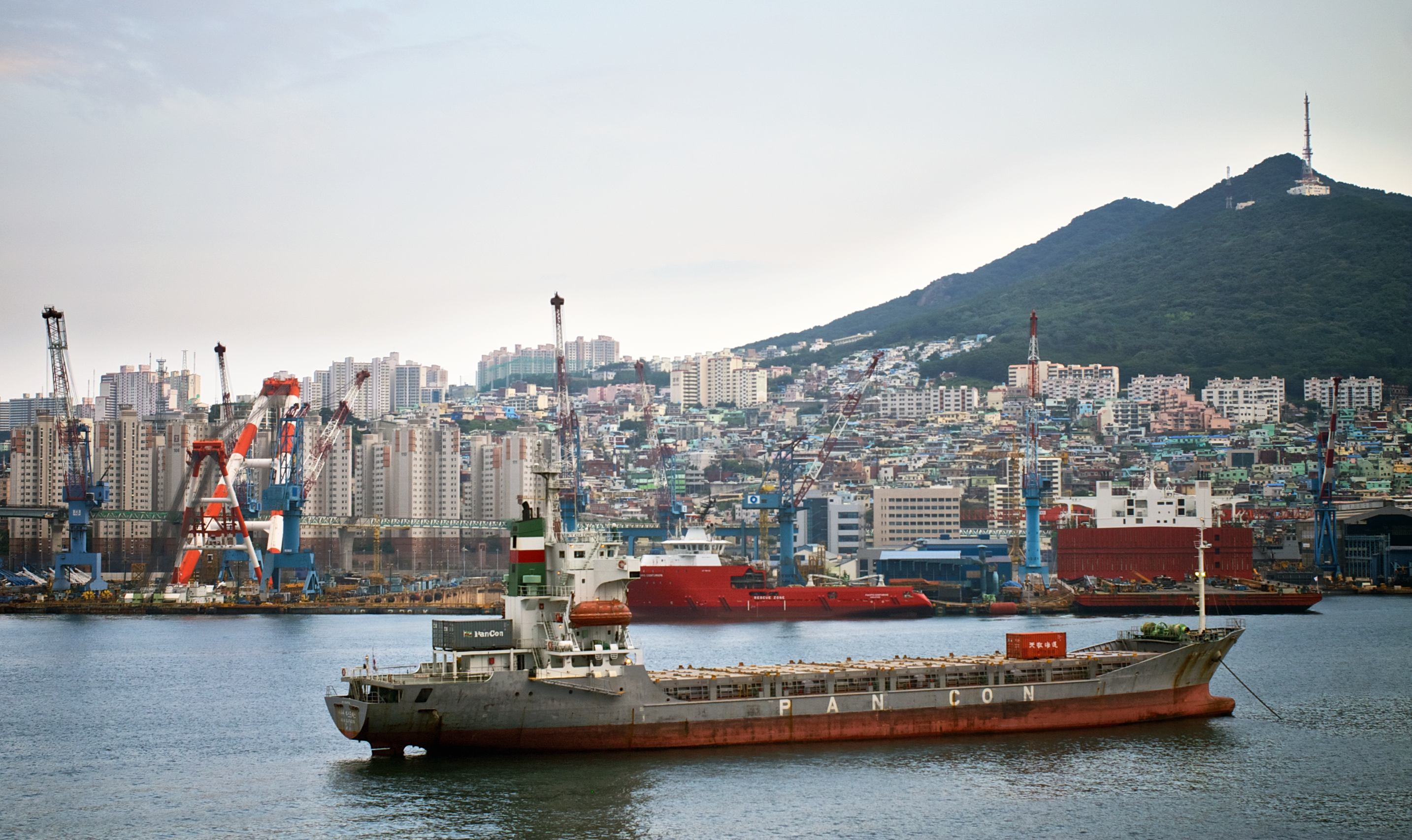

- Flag

- Country: South Korea
- Region: Yeongnam
- Provincial level: Busan
- Administrative divisions: 11 administrative dong

Government
  - Mayor: Kim Cheol-hun (김철훈)

Area
  - Total: 14.2 km^{2} (5.5 sq mi)

Population (September 2024)
  - Total: 104,661
  - Density: 7,370/km^{2} (19,100/sq mi)
  - Dialect: Gyeongsang
- Website: Yeongdo District Office

Korean name
- Hangul: 영도구
- Hanja: 影島區
- RR: Yeongdo-gu
- MR: Yŏngdo-gu

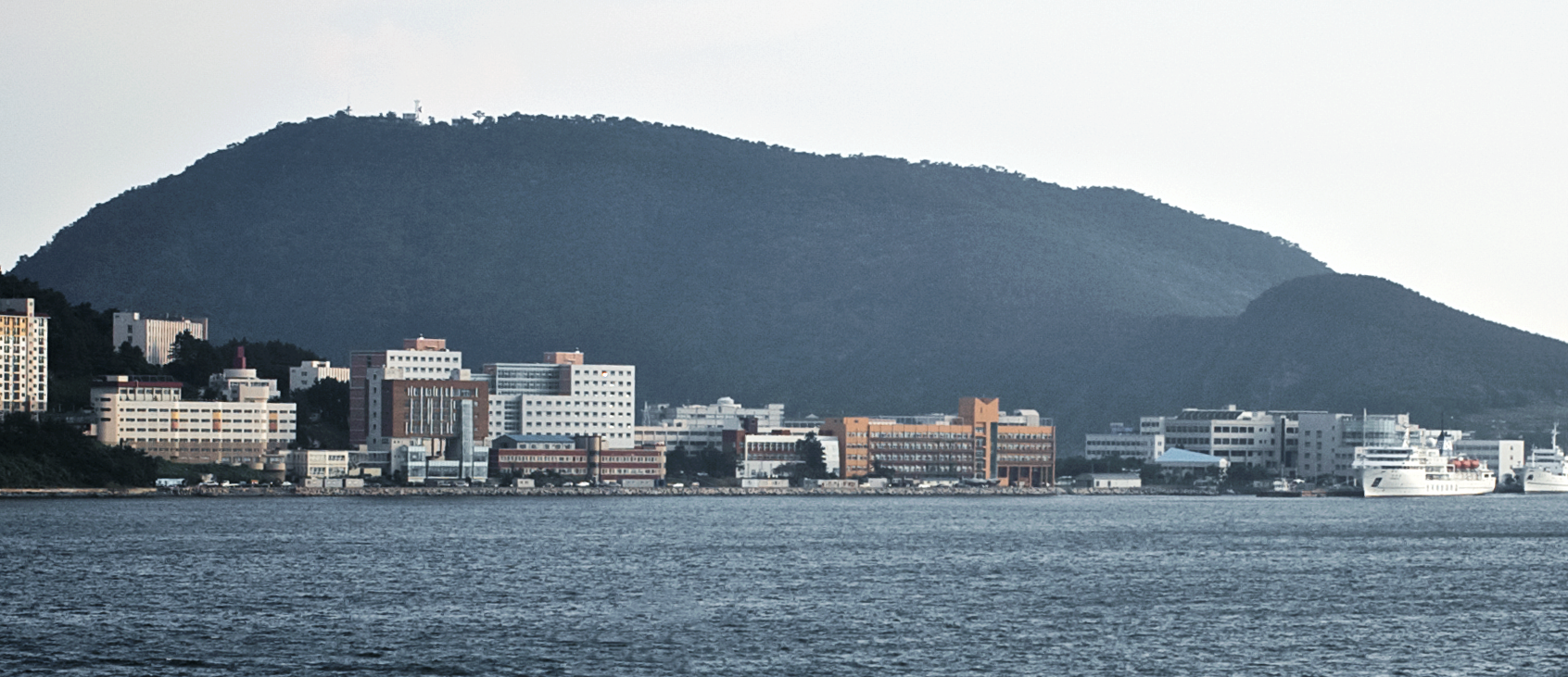
Korea Maritime and Ocean University

Yeongdo District (Korean: 영도구) is a gu (district) in Busan, South Korea. The gu itself is limited to Yeongdo (Yeong Island) located on the south edge of central Busan. It attained the status of gu in 1957.

The Korea Maritime and Ocean University and the National Maritime Museum of Korea are located in Yeongdo District.

== Origin of the Name "Yeongdo" ==
The former name of Yeongdo (Yeong Island) was Jeoryeongdo (Jeoryeong Island).

Mythologically, horses that could run a thousand miles, so-called "Chollima", lived on this island. Because the horses living on this island could run so fast that their shadows could not follow them, this island was called "Jeoryeongdo".

After the South Korea government arranged their administrative divisions' names, the name of the island was changed to, "Yeongdo District.

== Administrative divisions ==
Yeongdo District is divided into 22 legal dong, which all together comprise 11 administrative dong, as follows:

Legal dong	Administrative dong
Namhang-dong 1-ga	Namhang-dong
Namhang-dong 2-ga	Namhang-dong
Namhang-dong 3-ga	Namhang-dong
Daegyo-dong 1-ga	Namhang-dong
Daegyo-dong 2-ga	Namhang-dong
Daepyeong-dong 1-ga	Namhang-dong
Daepyeong-dong 2-ga	Namhang-dong
Daepyeong-dong 3-ga	Namhang-dong
Yeongseon-dong 1-ga	Yeongseon 1-dong
Yeongseon-dong 2-ga	Yeongseon 1-dong
Yeongseon-dong 3-ga	Yeongseon 2-dong
Yeongseon-song 4-ga	Yeongseon 2-dong
Sinseon-dong 1-ga	Sinseon-dong
Sinseon-dong 2-ga	Sinseon-dong
Sinseon-dong 3-ga	Sinseon-dong
Bongnae-dong 1-ga	Bongnae 1-dong
Bongnae-dong 2-ga	Bongnae 1-dong
Bongnae-dong 3-ga	Bongnae 1-dong
Bongnae-dong 4-ga	Bongnae 2-dong
Bongnae-dong 5-ga	Bongnae 2-dong
Cheonghak-dong	Cheonghak 1-dong
Cheonghak-dong	Cheonghak 2-dong
Dongsam-dong	Dongsam 1-dong
Dongsam-dong	Dongsam 2-dong
Dongsam-dong	Dongsam 3-dong

== Sister cities ==
- Luwan, China
- Marikina, Philippines

== Cityscape ==
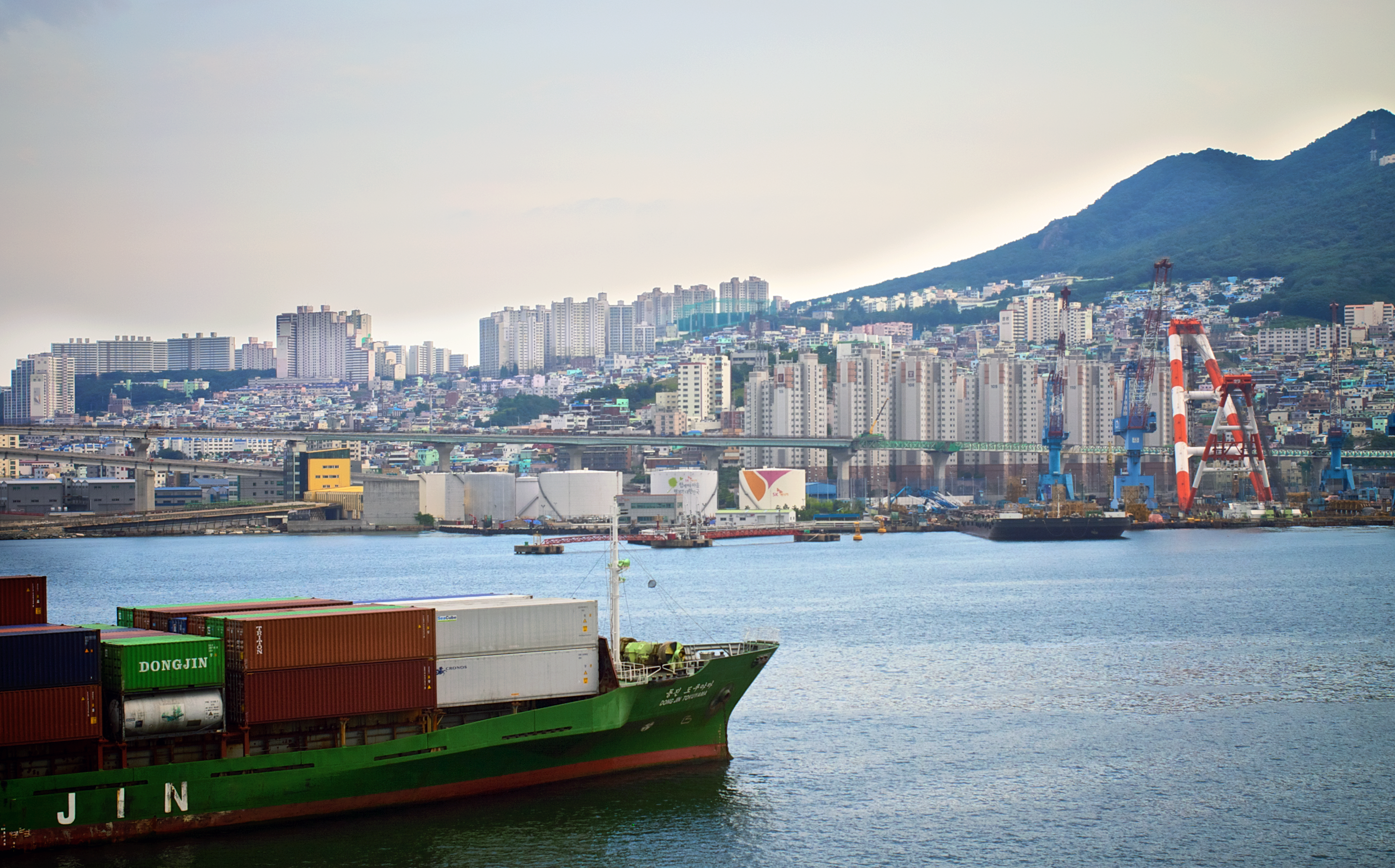

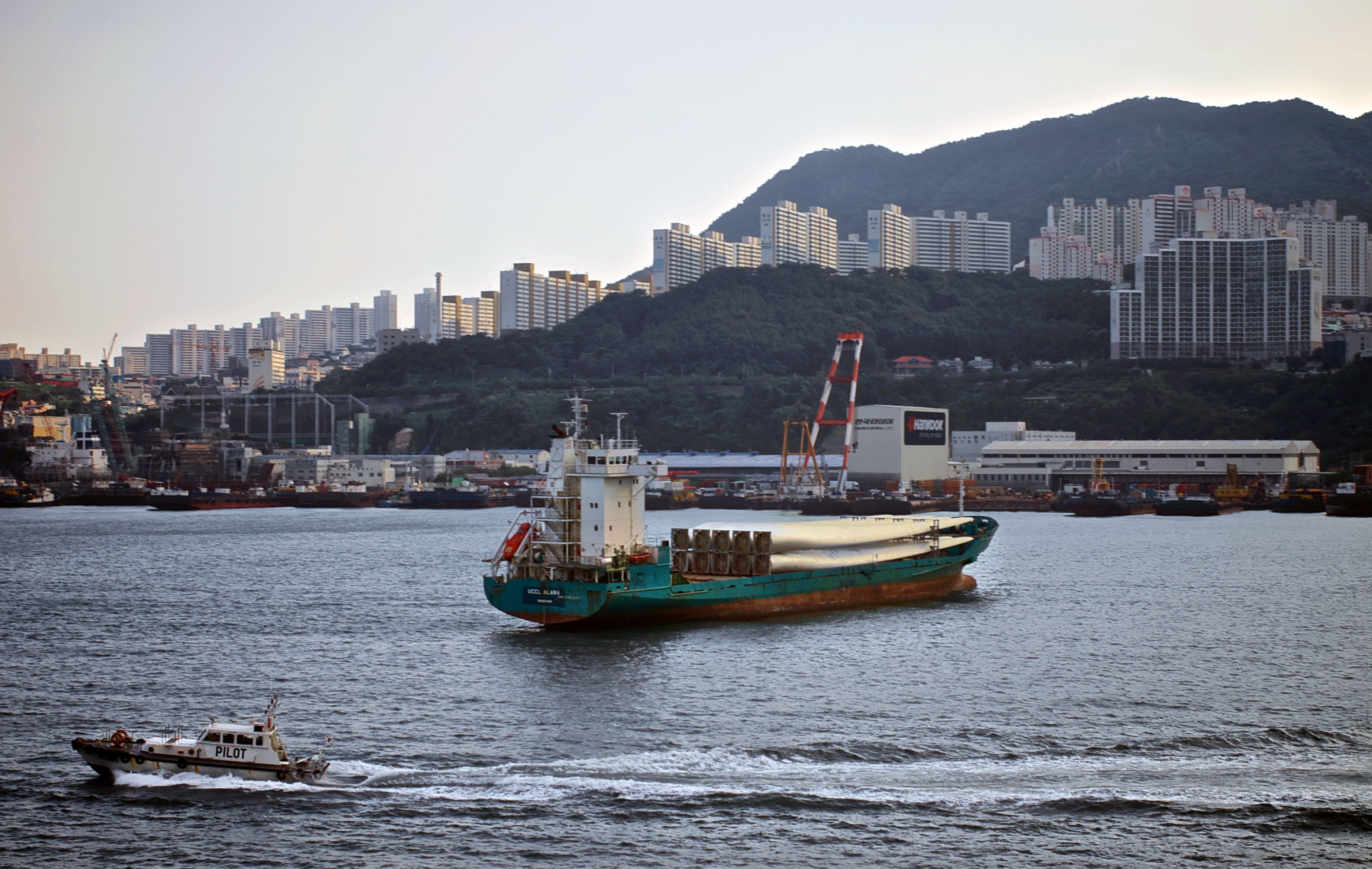

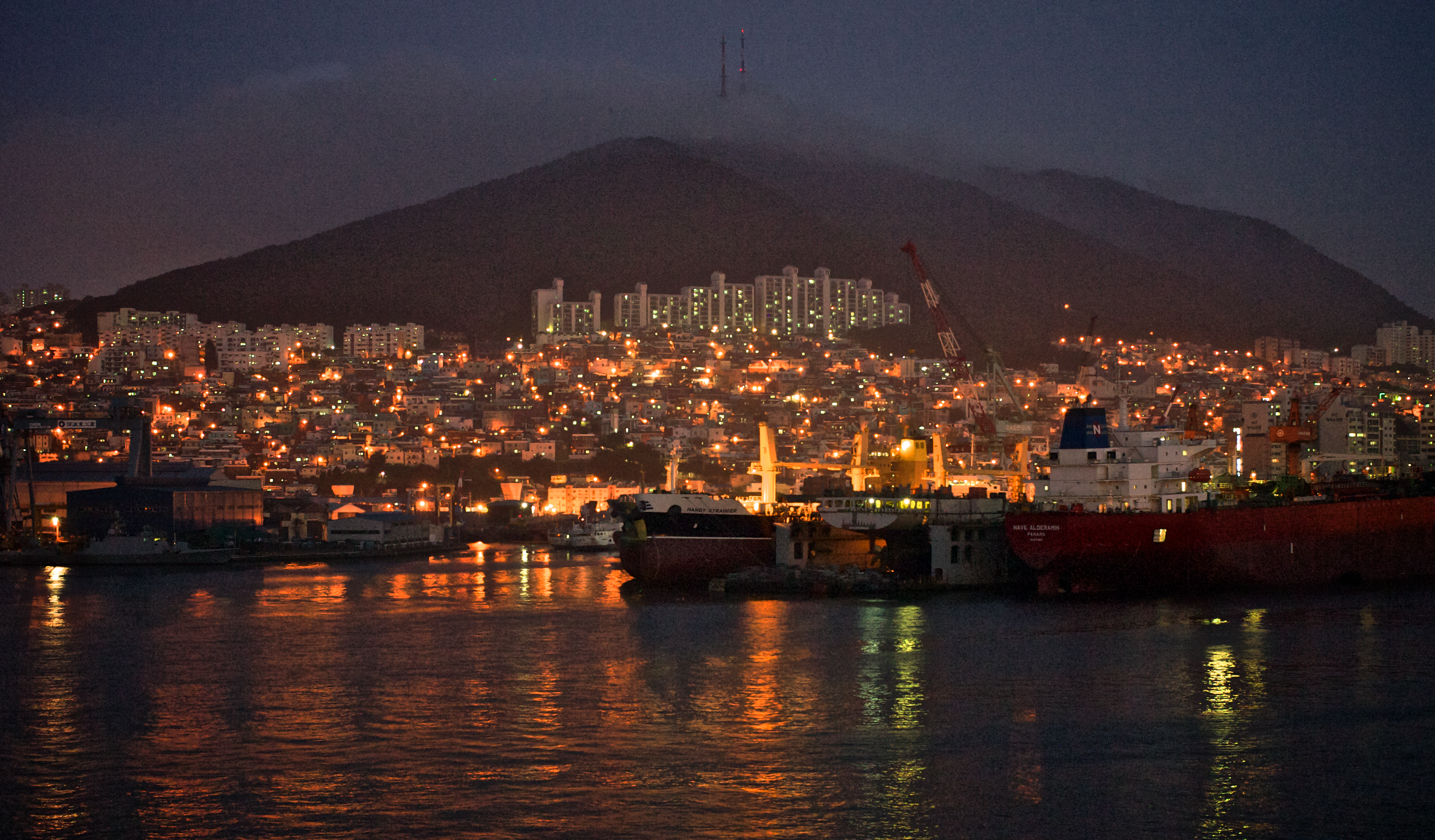
Nighttime in Yeongdo

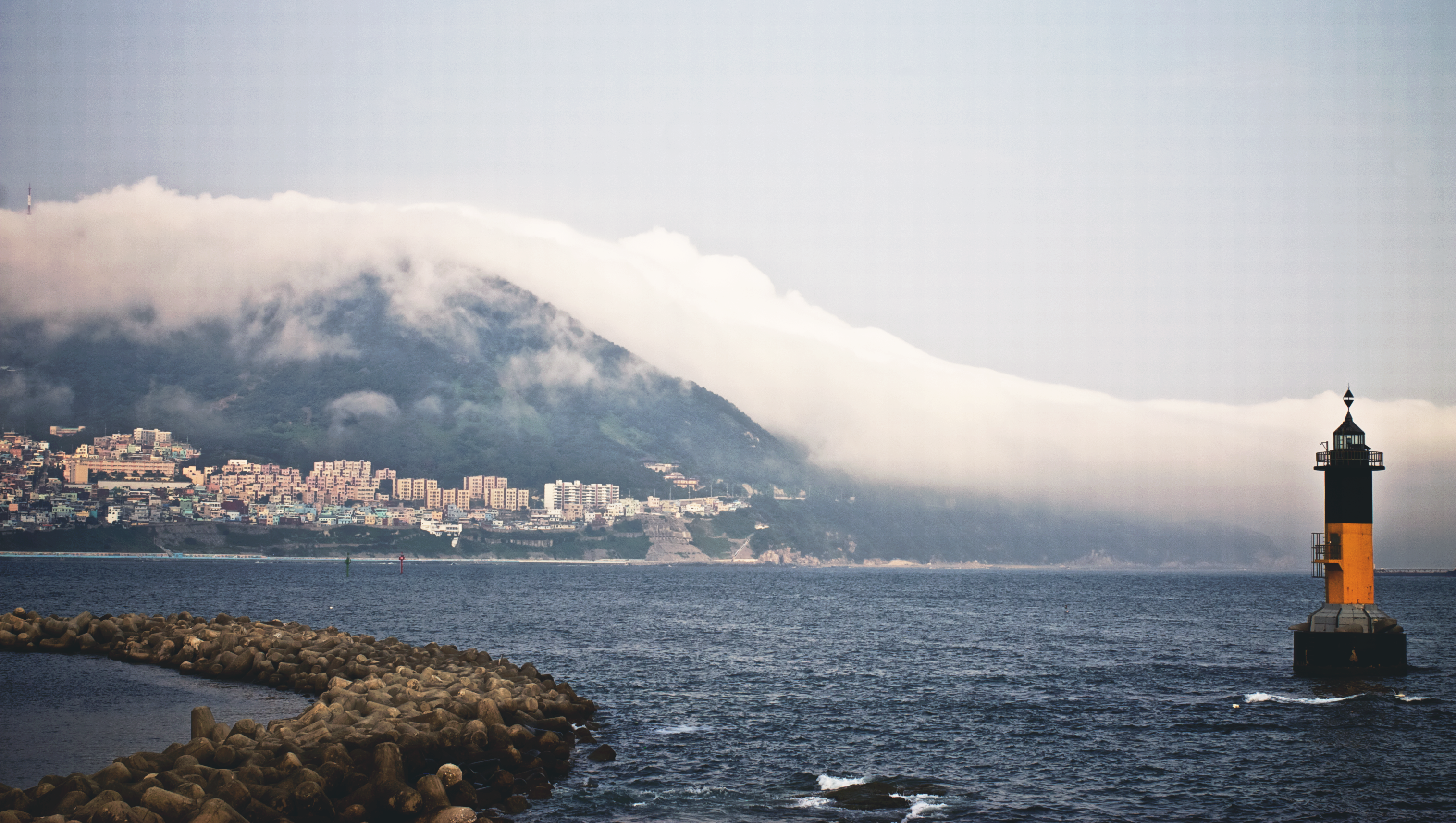
West Side of Yeongdo

== See also ==
- Geography of South Korea
- Subdivisions of South Korea
