= List of members of the National Assembly (South Korea), 2004–2008 =

The members of the seventeenth National Assembly of South Korea were elected on 15 April 2004. The Assembly sat from 30 May 2004 until 29 May 2008.

== Members ==
Province/city	Constituency	Member	Party	
Province/city	Constituency	Member	At election	At term's end
Seoul	Jongno	Park Jin	GNP	GNP
Seoul	Jung	Park Sung-vum	GNP	Independent
Seoul	Yongsan	Chin Young	GNP	GNP
Seoul	Seongdong A	Choi Jae-cheon	Uri	UDP
Seoul	Seongdong B	Im Jong-seok	Uri	UDP
Seoul	Gwangjin A	Kim Young-choon	Uri	Independent
Seoul	Gwangjin B	Kim Hyeong-joo	Uri	UDP
Seoul	Dongdaemun A	Kim Hee-sun	Uri	UDP
Seoul	Dongdaemun B	Hong Joon-pyo	GNP	GNP
Seoul	Jungnang A	Lee Hwa-young	Uri	UDP
Seoul	Jungnang B	Kim Duk-kyu	Uri	UDP
Seoul	Seongbuk A	Yoo Jay-kun	Uri	Independent
Seoul	Seongbuk B	Shin Geh-ryoon (Note: Shin Geh-ryoon was removed on 10 February 2006.)	Uri	UDP
Seoul	Seongbuk B	Chough Soon-hyung (Note: Chough Soon-hyung was by-elected on 26 July 2006, to succeed Shin Geh-ryoon.)	Democratic	LFP
Seoul	Gangbuk A	Oh Young-sik	Uri	UDP
Seoul	Gangbuk B	Choe Kyoo-sik	Uri	UDP
Seoul	Dobong A	Kim Geun-tae	Uri	UDP
Seoul	Dobong B	Yoo Ihn-tae	Uri	UDP
Seoul	Nowon A	Chung Bong-ju	Uri	UDP
Seoul	Nowon B	Woo Won-shik	Uri	UDP
Seoul	Nowon C	Lim Chae-jung	Uri	Independent
Seoul	Eunpyeong A	Lee Mi-kyung	Uri	UDP
Seoul	Eunpyeong B	Lee Jae-oh	GNP	GNP
Seoul	Seodaemun A	Woo Sang-ho	Uri	UDP
Seoul	Seodaemun B	Chung Doo-un	GNP	GNP
Seoul	Mapo A	Noh Woong-rae	Uri	UDP
Seoul	Mapo B	Jung Cheong-rae	Uri	UDP
Seoul	Yangcheon A	Won Hee-ryong	GNP	GNP
Seoul	Yangcheon B	Kim Nag-soon	Uri	UDP
Seoul	Gangseo A	Shin Ki-nam	Uri	UDP
Seoul	Gangseo B	Ro Hyu-song	Uri	UDP
Seoul	Guro A	Lee In-young	Uri	UDP
Seoul	Guro B	Kim Han-gil	Uri	UDP
Seoul	Geumcheon	Rhee Mok-hee	Uri	UDP
Seoul	Yeongdeungpo A	Go Jin-hwa	GNP	Independent
Seoul	Yeongdeungpo B	Kwon Young-se	GNP	GNP
Seoul	Dongjak A	Jun Byung-hun	Uri	UDP
Seoul	Dongjak B	Lee Kye-ahn	Uri	UDP
Seoul	Gwanak A	Yoo Ki-hong	Uri	UDP
Seoul	Gwanak B	Lee Hae-chan	Uri	Independent
Seoul	Seocho A	Lee Hye-hoon	GNP	GNP
Seoul	Seocho B	Kim Deog-ryong	GNP	GNP
Seoul	Gangnam A	Lee Jong-koo	GNP	GNP
Seoul	Gangnam B	Gong Sung-jin	GNP	GNP
Seoul	Songpa A	Maeng Hyung-kyu (Note: Maeng Hyung-kyu resigned on 31 January 2006, to run in the 2006 Seoul mayoral election, but returned by being by-elected on 26 July 2006.)	GNP	GNP
Seoul	Songpa B	Park Gye-dong	GNP	GNP
Seoul	Songpa C	Lee Keun-sik	Uri	Independent
Seoul	Gangdong A	Kim Choong-whan	GNP	GNP
Seoul	Gangdong B	Lee Sang-kyeong	Uri	UDP
Busan	Jung–Dong	Chung Ui-hwa	GNP	GNP
Busan	Seo	Yoo Ki-june	GNP	Independent
Busan	Yeongdo	Kim Hyong-o	GNP	GNP
Busan	Busanjin A	Kim Byung-ho (Note: Kim Byung-ho was removed on 13 December 2007.)	GNP	Independent
Busan	Busanjin B	Lee Seong-kweun	GNP	GNP
Busan	Dongrae	Lee Jae-woong	GNP	GNP
Busan	Nam A	Kim Jung-hoon	GNP	GNP
Busan	Nam B	Kim Moo-sung	GNP	Independent
Busan	Buk–Gangseo A	Chung Hyung-keun	GNP	GNP
Busan	Buk–Gangseo B	Huh Tae-yeol	GNP	GNP
Busan	Haeundae–Gijang A	Suh Byung-soo	GNP	GNP
Busan	Haeundae–Gijang B	An Kyung-ryul	GNP	GNP
Busan	Saha A	Eom Ho-sung	GNP	Pro-Park
Busan	Saha B	Cho Kyoung-tae	Uri	UDP
Busan	Geumjeong	Park Seung-hwan	GNP	GNP
Busan	Yeonje	Kim Hee-jung	GNP	GNP
Busan	Suyeong	Park Hyung-joon	GNP	GNP
Busan	Sasang	Kwon Chul-hyun	GNP	GNP
Daegu	Jung–Nam	Koak Sung-moon	GNP	LFP
Daegu	Dong A	Joo Sung-young	GNP	GNP
Daegu	Dong B	Park Chang-dal (Note: Park Chang-dal was removed on 15 September 2005, after his election was invalidated.)	GNP	GNP
Daegu	Dong B	Yoo Seong-min (Note: Yoo Seong-min was by-elected on 26 October 2005, to succeed Park Chang-dal.)	GNP	GNP
Daegu	Seo	Kang Jae-sup	GNP	GNP
Daegu	Buk A	Lee Myung-gyu	GNP	GNP
Daegu	Buk B	Ahn Taek-soo	GNP	GNP
Daegu	Suseong A	Lee Hahn-koo	GNP	GNP
Daegu	Suseong B	Joo Ho-young	GNP	GNP
Daegu	Dalseo A	Park Jong-keun	GNP	Pro-Park
Daegu	Dalseo B	Lee Hae-bong	GNP	Independent
Daegu	Dalseo C	Kim Suk-joon	GNP	GNP
Daegu	Dalseong	Park Geun-hye	GNP	GNP
Incheon	Jung–Dong–Ongjin	Han Kwang-won	Uri	UDP
Incheon	Nam A	Yu Phil-u	Uri	UDP
Incheon	Nam B	Ahn Young-keun	Uri	Independent
Incheon	Yeonsu	Hwang Woo-yea	GNP	GNP
Incheon	Namdong A	Lee Yoon-sung	GNP	GNP
Incheon	Namdong B	Lee Ho-woong (Note: Lee Ho-woong was removed on 14 September 2006.)	Uri	Uri
Incheon	Namdong B	Lee Weon-bok (Note: Lee Weon-bok was by-elected on 25 October 2006, to succeed Lee Ho-woong.)	GNP	Independent
Incheon	Bupyeong A	Moon Byeong-ho	Uri	UDP
Incheon	Bupyeong B	Choi Yong-gyu	Uri	UDP
Incheon	Gyeyang A	Shin Hak-young	Uri	UDP
Incheon	Gyeyang B	Song Young-gil	Uri	UDP
Incheon	Seo–Ganghwa A	Kim Kyo-heung	Uri	UDP
Incheon	Seo–Ganghwa B	Lee Kyeong-jae	GNP	Independent
Gwangju	Dong	Yang Hyung-il	Uri	UDP
Gwangju	Seo A	Yum Dong-yun	Uri	UDP
Gwangju	Seo B	Chung Dong-chae	Uri	UDP
Gwangju	Nam	Jee Byung-moon	Uri	UDP
Gwangju	Buk A	Kang Gi-jung	Uri	UDP
Gwangju	Buk B	Kim Tae-hong	Uri	UDP
Gwangju	Gwangsan	Kim Dong-cheol	Uri	UDP
Daejeon	Dong	Sun Byong-ryul	Uri	UDP
Daejeon	Jung	Kwon Sun-taik	Uri	LFP
Daejeon	Seo A	Park Byeong-seug	Uri	UDP
Daejeon	Seo B	Ku Non-hoe (Note: Ku Non-hoe died on 5 November 2006.)	Uri	Uri
Daejeon	Seo B	Sim Dae-pyung (Note: Sim Dae-pyung was by-elected on 25 April 2007, to succeed Ku Non-hoe.)	PFP	LFP
Daejeon	Yuseong	Lee Sang-min	Uri	LFP
Daejeon	Daedeok	Kim Won-wung	Uri	UDP
Ulsan	Jung	Jeong Kab-yoon	GNP	GNP
Ulsan	Nam A	Choi Byung-gook	GNP	GNP
Ulsan	Nam B	Kim Gi-hyeon	GNP	GNP
Ulsan	Dong	Chung Mong-joon	NI21	GNP
Ulsan	Buk	Cho Seung-soo (Note: Cho Seung-soo was removed on 29 September 2005.)	DLP	DLP
Ulsan	Buk	Yoon Doo-hwan (Note: Yoon Doo-hwan was by-elected on 26 October 2005, to succeed Cho Seung-soo.)	GNP	GNP
Ulsan	Ulju	Kang Ghil-boo	Uri	Independent
Gyeonggi Province	Jangan, Suwon	Sim Jae-duck	Uri	Independent
Gyeonggi Province	Gwonseon, Suwon	Lee Ki-woo	Uri	UDP
Gyeonggi Province	Paldal, Suwon	Nam Kyung-pil	GNP	GNP
Gyeonggi Province	Yeongtong, Suwon	Kim Jin-pyo	Uri	UDP
Gyeonggi Province	Sujeong, Seongnam	Kim Tae-nyeon	Uri	UDP
Gyeonggi Province	Jungwon, Seongnam	Lee Sang-rak (Note: Lee Sang-rak was removed on 10 December 2004.)	Uri	Uri
Gyeonggi Province	Jungwon, Seongnam	Shin Sang-jin (Note: Shin Sang-jin was by-elected on 30 April 2005, to succeed Lee Sang-rak.)	GNP	GNP
Gyeonggi Province	Bundang A, Seongnam	Ko Heung-kil	GNP	GNP
Gyeonggi Province	Bundang B, Seongnam	Yim Tae-hee	GNP	GNP
Gyeonggi Province	Uijeongbu A	Moon Hee-sang	Uri	UDP
Gyeonggi Province	Uijeongbu B	Kang Sung-jong	Uri	UDP
Gyeonggi Province	Manan, Anyang	Lee Jong-kul	Uri	UDP
Gyeonggi Province	Dongan A, Anyang	Lee Seok-hyun	Uri	UDP
Gyeonggi Province	Dongan B, Anyang	Shim Jae-chul	GNP	GNP
Gyeonggi Province	Wonmi A, Bucheon	Kim Ki-suk (Note: Kim Ki-suk was removed on 24 May 2005.)	Uri	Uri
Gyeonggi Province	Wonmi A, Bucheon	Lim Hae-kyu (Note: Lim Hae-kyu was by-elected on 26 October 2005, to succeed Kim Ki-suk.)	GNP	GNP
Gyeonggi Province	Wonmi B, Bucheon	Bae Ki-sun	Uri	UDP
Gyeonggi Province	Sosa, Bucheon	Kim Moon-soo (Note: Kim Moon-soo resigned on 31 January 2006, to run in the 2006 Gyeonggi gubernatorial election.)	GNP	GNP
Gyeonggi Province	Sosa, Bucheon	Cha Myong-jin (Note: Cha Myong-jin was by-elected on 26 July 2006, to succeed Kim Moon-soo.)	GNP	GNP
Gyeonggi Province	Ojeong, Bucheon	Won Hye-young	Uri	UDP
Gyeonggi Province	Gwangmyeong A	Lee Won-young	Uri	UDP
Gyeonggi Province	Gwangmyeong B	Jeon Jae-hee	GNP	GNP
Gyeonggi Province	Pyeongtaek A	Woo Je-hang	Uri	UDP
Gyeonggi Province	Pyeongtaek B	Jung Jang-seon	Uri	UDP
Gyeonggi Province	Yangju–Dongducheon	Jung Sung-ho	Uri	UDP
Gyeonggi Province	Sangrok A, Ansan	Jang Kyung-su	Uri	UDP
Gyeonggi Province	Sangrok B, Ansan	Im Jong-in	Uri	Independent
Gyeonggi Province	Danwon A, Ansan	Chun Jung-bae	Uri	UDP
Gyeonggi Province	Danwon B, Ansan	Je Jong-geel	Uri	UDP
Gyeonggi Province	Deokyang A, Goyang	Rhyu Si-min	Uri	Independent
Gyeonggi Province	Deokyang B, Goyang	Choi Sung	Uri	UDP
Gyeonggi Province	Ilsan A, Goyang	Han Myeong-sook	Uri	UDP
Gyeonggi Province	Ilsan B, Goyang	Kim Young-sun	GNP	GNP
Gyeonggi Province	Uiwang–Gwacheon	Ahn Sang-soo	GNP	GNP
Gyeonggi Province	Guri	Yun Ho-jung	Uri	UDP
Gyeonggi Province	Namyangju A	Choi Jae-sung	Uri	UDP
Gyeonggi Province	Namyangju B	Park Ki-choon	Uri	UDP
Gyeonggi Province	Osan	An Min-suk	Uri	UDP
Gyeonggi Province	Hwaseong	Ahn Byong-yub (Note: Ahn Byong-yub was removed on 10 November 2006, after his election was invalidated.)	Uri	Uri
Gyeonggi Province	Hwaseong	Ko Hee-sun (Note: Ko Hee-sun was by-elected on 25 April 2007, to succeed Ahn Byong-yub.)	GNP	GNP
Gyeonggi Province	Siheung A	Baek Won-woo	Uri	UDP
Gyeonggi Province	Siheung B	Cho Jeong-sik	Uri	UDP
Gyeonggi Province	Gunpo	Kim Boo-kyum	Uri	UDP
Gyeonggi Province	Hanam	Moon Hak-jin	Uri	UDP
Gyeonggi Province	Paju	Lee Jai-chang	GNP	GNP
Gyeonggi Province	Icheon–Yeoju	Rhee Q-taek	GNP	Pro-Park
Gyeonggi Province	Yongin A	Ooh Che-chang	Uri	UDP
Gyeonggi Province	Yongin B	Han Sun-kyo	GNP	Independent
Gyeonggi Province	Anseong	Kim Seon-mi	Uri	Independent
Gyeonggi Province	Gimpo	Yoo Jeong-bok	GNP	GNP
Gyeonggi Province	Gwangju	Park Hyuk-kyu (Note: Park Hyuk-kyu was removed on 9 September 2005.)	GNP	GNP
Gyeonggi Province	Gwangju	Chung Chin-sup (Note: Chung Chin-sup was by-elected on 26 October 2005, to succeed Park Hyuk-kyu.)	GNP	GNP
Gyeonggi Province	Pocheon–Yeoncheon	Lee Chul-woo (Note: Lee Chul-woo was removed on 28 March 2005.)	Uri	Uri
Gyeonggi Province	Pocheon–Yeoncheon	Ko Jeou-heung (Note: Ko Jeou-heung was by-elected on 30 April 2005, to succeed Lee Chul-woo.)	GNP	GNP
Gyeonggi Province	Yangpyeong–Gapyeong	Choung Byoung-gug	GNP	GNP
Gangwon Province	Chuncheon	Huh Cheon	GNP	GNP
Gangwon Province	Wonju	Lee Ke-jin	GNP	GNP
Gangwon Province	Gangneung	Shim Jae-yup	GNP	GNP
Gangwon Province	Donghae–Samcheok	Choi Yeon-hee	GNP	Independent
Gangwon Province	Sokcho–Goseong–Yangyang	Chung Moon-hun	GNP	GNP
Gangwon Province	Hongcheon–Hoengseong	Cho Il-hyun	Uri	UDP
Gangwon Province	Taebaek–Yeongwol–Pyeongchang–Jeongseon	Lee Kwang-jae	Uri	UDP
Gangwon Province	Cheolwon–Hwacheon–Yanggu–Inje	Park Sei-hwan	GNP	GNP
North Chungcheong Province	Sangdang, Cheongju	Hong Jae-hyong	Uri	UDP
North Chungcheong Province	Heungdeok A, Cheongju	Oh Jae-sae	Uri	UDP
North Chungcheong Province	Heungdeok B, Cheongju	Noh Young-min	Uri	UDP
North Chungcheong Province	Chungju	Lee Si-jong	Uri	UDP
North Chungcheong Province	Jecheon–Danyang	Suh Jae-kwan	Uri	UDP
North Chungcheong Province	Cheongwon	Byun Jae-il	Uri	UDP
North Chungcheong Province	Boeun–Okcheon–Yeongdong	Lee Yong-hee	Uri	LFP
North Chungcheong Province	Jeungpyeong–Jincheon–Gwisan–Eumseong	Kim Jong-yull	Uri	UDP
South Chungcheong Province	Cheonan A	Yang Seoung-jo	Uri	UDP
South Chungcheong Province	Cheonan B	Park Sang-don	Uri	LFP
South Chungcheong Province	Gongju–Yeongi	Oh Si-duck (Note: Oh Si-duck was removed on 28 January 2005.)	Uri	Uri
South Chungcheong Province	Gongju–Yeongi	Chung Jin-suk (Note: Chung Jin-suk was by-elected on 30 April 2005, to succeed Oh Si-duck.)	Independent	GNP
South Chungcheong Province	Boryeong–Seocheon	Ryu Keun-chan	ULD	LFP
South Chungcheong Province	Asan	Bok Ki-wang (Note: Bok Ki-wang was removed on 10 March 2005.)	Uri	Uri
South Chungcheong Province	Asan	Lee Jin-koo (Note: Lee Jin-koo was by-elected on 30 April 2005, to succeed Bok Ki-wang.)	GNP	GNP
South Chungcheong Province	Seosan–Taean	Moon Seok-ho	Uri	UDP
South Chungcheong Province	Nonsan–Gyeryong–Geumsan	Lee In-je	ULD	Independent
South Chungcheong Province	Buyeo–Cheongyang	Kim Hak-won	ULD	GNP
South Chungcheong Province	Hongseong–Yesan	Hong Moon-pyo	GNP	GNP
South Chungcheong Province	Dangjin	Kim Nak-sung	ULD	LFP
North Jeolla Province	Wansan A, Jeonju	Chang Young-dal	Uri	UDP
North Jeolla Province	Wansan B, Jeonju	Lee Kwang-chol	Uri	UDP
North Jeolla Province	Deokjin, Jeonju	Chae Su-chan	Uri	UDP
North Jeolla Province	Gunsan	Kang Bong-kyun	Uri	UDP
North Jeolla Province	Iksan A	Han Byung-do	Uri	UDP
North Jeolla Province	Iksan B	Cho Bae-sook	Uri	UDP
North Jeolla Province	Jeongeup	Kim Won-ki	Uri	UDP
North Jeolla Province	Namwon–Sunchang	Lee Kang-rae	Uri	UDP
North Jeolla Province	Gimje–Wanju	Choi Kyu-sung	Uri	UDP
North Jeolla Province	Jinan–Muju–Jangsu–Imsil	Chung Sye-kyun	Uri	UDP
North Jeolla Province	Gochang–Buan	Kim Choon-jin	Uri	UDP
South Jeolla Province	Mokpo	Lee Sang-yul	MDP	Independent
South Jeolla Province	Yeosu A	Kim Sung-gon	Uri	UDP
South Jeolla Province	Yeosu B	Joo Seung-yong	Uri	UDP
South Jeolla Province	Suncheon	Suh Gab-won	Uri	UDP
South Jeolla Province	Naju–Hwasun	Choi In-kee	Independent	UDP
South Jeolla Province	Gwangyang–Gurye	Woo Yoon-keun	Uri	UDP
South Jeolla Province	Damyang–Gokseong–Jangseong	Kim Hyo-seuk	MDP	UDP
South Jeolla Province	Goheung–Boseong	Shin Jung-sik	Uri	UDP
South Jeolla Province	Jangheung–Yeongam	Lew Seon-ho	Uri	UDP
South Jeolla Province	Gangjin–Wando	Yi Young-ho	Uri	UDP
South Jeolla Province	Haenam–Jindo	Lee Jung-il (Note: Lee Jung-il was removed on 25 August 2006.)	MDP	Democratic
South Jeolla Province	Haenam–Jindo	Chae Il-byung (Note: Chae Il-byung was by-elected on 25 October 2006, to succeed Lee Jung-il.)	Democratic	UDP
South Jeolla Province	Muan–Sinan	Hahn Hwa-kap (Note: Hahn Hwa-kap was removed on 22 December 2006.)	MDP	Democratic
South Jeolla Province	Muan–Sinan	Kim Hong-up (Note: Kim Hong-up was by-elected on 25 April 2007, to succeed Hahn Hwa-kap.)	Democratic	Independent
South Jeolla Province	Hampyeong–Yeonggwang	Lee Nak-yon	MDP	UDP
North Gyeongsang Province	Buk, Pohang	Lee Byung-suk	GNP	GNP
North Gyeongsang Province	Nam, Pohang–Ulleung	Lee Sang-deuk	GNP	GNP
North Gyeongsang Province	Gyeongju	Jung Jong-bok	GNP	GNP
North Gyeongsang Province	Gimcheon	Rim In-bae	GNP	GNP
North Gyeongsang Province	Andong	Kwon Oh-eul	GNP	GNP
North Gyeongsang Province	Gumi A	Kim Seong-jo	GNP	GNP
North Gyeongsang Province	Gumi B	Kim Tae-whan	GNP	Independent
North Gyeongsang Province	Yeongju	Chang Yoon-seok	GNP	GNP
North Gyeongsang Province	Yeongcheon	Lee Duk-mo (Note: Lee Duk-mo was removed on 18 February 2005.)	GNP	GNP
North Gyeongsang Province	Yeongcheon	Chung Hee-soo (Note: Chung Hee-soo was by-elected on 30 April 2005, to succeed Lee Duk-mo.)	GNP	GNP
North Gyeongsang Province	Sangju	Lee Sang-bae	GNP	GNP
North Gyeongsang Province	Mungyeong–Yecheon	Shin Kook-hwan	Independent	UDP
North Gyeongsang Province	Gyeongsan–Cheongdo	Choi Kyung-hwan	GNP	GNP
North Gyeongsang Province	Goryeong–Seongju–Chilgok	Lee In-ki	GNP	Independent
North Gyeongsang Province	Gunwi–Uiseong–Cheongsong	Kim Jae-won	GNP	GNP
North Gyeongsang Province	Yeongyang–Yeongdeok–Bonghwa–Uljin	Kim Kwang-won	GNP	GNP
South Gyeongsang Province	Changwon A	Kwon Kyung-seok	GNP	GNP
South Gyeongsang Province	Changwon B	Kwon Young-ghil	DLP	DLP
South Gyeongsang Province	Masan A	Kim Jung-boo (Note: Kim Jung-boo was removed on 12 May 2006.)	GNP	GNP
South Gyeongsang Province	Masan A	Lee Ju-young (Note: Lee Ju-young was by-elected on 26 July 2006, to succeed Kim Jung-boo.)	GNP	GNP
South Gyeongsang Province	Masan B	Ahn Hong-joon	GNP	GNP
South Gyeongsang Province	Jinju A	Choi Gu-sik	GNP	Independent
South Gyeongsang Province	Jinju B	Kim Jae-kyung	GNP	GNP
South Gyeongsang Province	Jinhae	Kim Hak-song	GNP	GNP
South Gyeongsang Province	Tongyeong–Goseong	Kim Myeong-ju	GNP	Independent
South Gyeongsang Province	Sacheon	Lee Bang-ho	GNP	GNP
South Gyeongsang Province	Gimhae A	Kim Maeng-gon (Note: Kim Maeng-gon was removed on 27 March 2005.)	Uri	Uri
South Gyeongsang Province	Gimhae A	Kim Chung-kwon (Note: Kim Chung-kwon was by-elected on 30 April 2005, to succeed Kim Maeng-gon.)	GNP	GNP
South Gyeongsang Province	Gimhae B	Choi Chul-kook	Uri	UDP
South Gyeongsang Province	Milyang–Changnyeong	Kim Yong-kap	GNP	GNP
South Gyeongsang Province	Geoje	Kim Ki-choon	GNP	GNP
South Gyeongsang Province	Yangsan	Kim Yang-soo	GNP	GNP
South Gyeongsang Province	Uiryeong–Haman–Hapcheon	Kim Yeong-deok	GNP	GNP
South Gyeongsang Province	Namhae–Hadong	Park Hee-tae	GNP	GNP
South Gyeongsang Province	Sancheong–Hamyang–Geochang	Lee Kang-too	GNP	GNP
Jeju Province	Jeju City–Bukjeju A	Kang Chang-il	Uri	UDP
Jeju Province	Jeju City–Bukjeju B	Kim Woo-nam	Uri	UDP
Jeju Province	Seogwipo–Namjeju	Kim Jae-yun	Uri	UDP
National	Proportional representation	Jang Hyang-sook	Uri	UDP
National	Proportional representation	Hong Chang-sun	Uri	UDP
National	Proportional representation	Kim Myung-ja	Uri	UDP
National	Proportional representation	Kim Hyuk-kyu (Note: Kim Hyuk-kyu was removed on 15 October 2007.)	Uri	Uri
National	Proportional representation	Lee Kyung-sook	Uri	UDP
National	Proportional representation	Park Chan-suk	Uri	UDP
National	Proportional representation	Hong Mi-young	Uri	UDP
National	Proportional representation	Cho Seong-tae	Uri	UDP
National	Proportional representation	Park Young-sun	Uri	UDP
National	Proportional representation	Chung Eui-yong	Uri	UDP
National	Proportional representation	Kim Hyun-mee	Uri	UDP
National	Proportional representation	Park Myung-kwang	Uri	UDP
National	Proportional representation	Kim Young-joo	Uri	UDP
National	Proportional representation	Cho Sung-rai	Uri	UDP
National	Proportional representation	Kang Hye-sook	Uri	UDP
National	Proportional representation	Chung Duck-koo (Note: Chung Duck-koo was removed on 1 February 2007.)	Uri	Uri
National	Proportional representation	Lee Eun-young	Uri	UDP
National	Proportional representation	Min Byung-doo	Uri	UDP
National	Proportional representation	Yoon Won-ho	Uri	UDP
National	Proportional representation	Park Hong-soo (Note: Park Hong-soo resigned on 6 January 2005, upon being appointed as Ministry of Agriculture.)	Uri	Uri
National	Proportional representation	You Seung-hee	Uri	UDP
National	Proportional representation	Chang Bok-sim	Uri	UDP
National	Proportional representation	Kim Jae-hong	Uri	UDP
National	Proportional representation	Suh Hae-suk (Note: Suh Hae-suk took office on 6 January 2005, to succeed Park Hong-soo.)	Uri	UDP
National	Proportional representation	Shin Myoung (Note: Shin Myoung took office on 1 February 2007, to succeed Chung Duck-koo.)	Uri	UDP
National	Proportional representation	Kim Young-dae (Note: Kim Young-dae took office on 15 October 2007, to succeed Kim Hyuk-kyu.)	GUDNP (Note: Included in the Uri Party list in the 2004 election.)	UDP
National	Proportional representation	Kim Ae-sil	GNP	GNP
National	Proportional representation	Park Se-il (Note: Park Se-il resigned on 23 March 2005.)	GNP	GNP
National	Proportional representation	Park Chan-sook	GNP	GNP
National	Proportional representation	Yun Kun-young	GNP	GNP
National	Proportional representation	Song Young-sun	GNP	GNP
National	Proportional representation	Hwang Jin-ha	GNP	GNP
National	Proportional representation	Chun Yu-ok	GNP	GNP
National	Proportional representation	Jung Hwa-won	GNP	GNP
National	Proportional representation	Lee Kei-kyung	GNP	GNP
National	Proportional representation	Bahk Jae-wan	GNP	GNP
National	Proportional representation	Na Kyung-won	GNP	GNP
National	Proportional representation	Lee Ju-ho	GNP	GNP
National	Proportional representation	Kim Young-sook	GNP	GNP
National	Proportional representation	Yoo Seong-min (Note: Yoo Seong-min resigned on 13 October 2005, to run in the 2005 Dong B, Daegu by-election.)	GNP	GNP
National	Proportional representation	Ko Kyung-hwa	GNP	GNP
National	Proportional representation	Lee Koon-hyon	GNP	GNP
National	Proportional representation	Chin Soo-hee	GNP	GNP
National	Proportional representation	Bae-il-do	GNP	GNP
National	Proportional representation	Ahn Myoung-ock	GNP	GNP
National	Proportional representation	Suh Sang-kee	GNP	GNP
National	Proportional representation	Park Soon-ja	GNP	GNP
National	Proportional representation	Lee Sung-ku (Note: Lee Sung-ku took office on 23 March 2005, to succeed Park Se-il.)	GNP	GNP
National	Proportional representation	Moon Hee (Note: Moon Hee took office on 13 October 2005, to succeed Yoo Seong-min.)	GNP	GNP
National	Proportional representation	Sim Sang-jung (Note: Sim Sang-jung was removed on 14 February 2008.)	DLP	DLP
National	Proportional representation	Dan Byung-ho (Note: Dan Byung-ho was removed on 20 February 2008.)	DLP	DLP
National	Proportional representation	Lee Young-soon	DLP	DLP
National	Proportional representation	Cheon Young-se	DLP	DLP
National	Proportional representation	Choi Soon-young	DLP	DLP
National	Proportional representation	Kang Gi-gap	DLP	DLP
National	Proportional representation	Hyun Ae-ja	DLP	DLP
National	Proportional representation	Roh Hoe-chan (Note: Roh Hoe-chan was removed on 14 February 2008.)	DLP	DLP
National	Proportional representation	Sohn Bong-scuk	MDP	UDP
National	Proportional representation	Kim Chong-in	MDP	UDP
National	Proportional representation	Lee Seung-hee	MDP	UDP
National	Proportional representation	Kim Hong-il (Note: Kim Hong-il was removed on 28 September 2006.)	MDP	Democratic
National	Proportional representation	Kim Song-ja (Note: Kim Song-ja took office on 28 September 2006, to succeed Kim Hong-il.)	Democratic (Note: Included in the Millennium Democratic Party list in the 2004 election.)	UDP
