= Governor of South Chungcheong Province =

Political office in South Korea

- 충청남도지사
- Seal of South Chungcheong

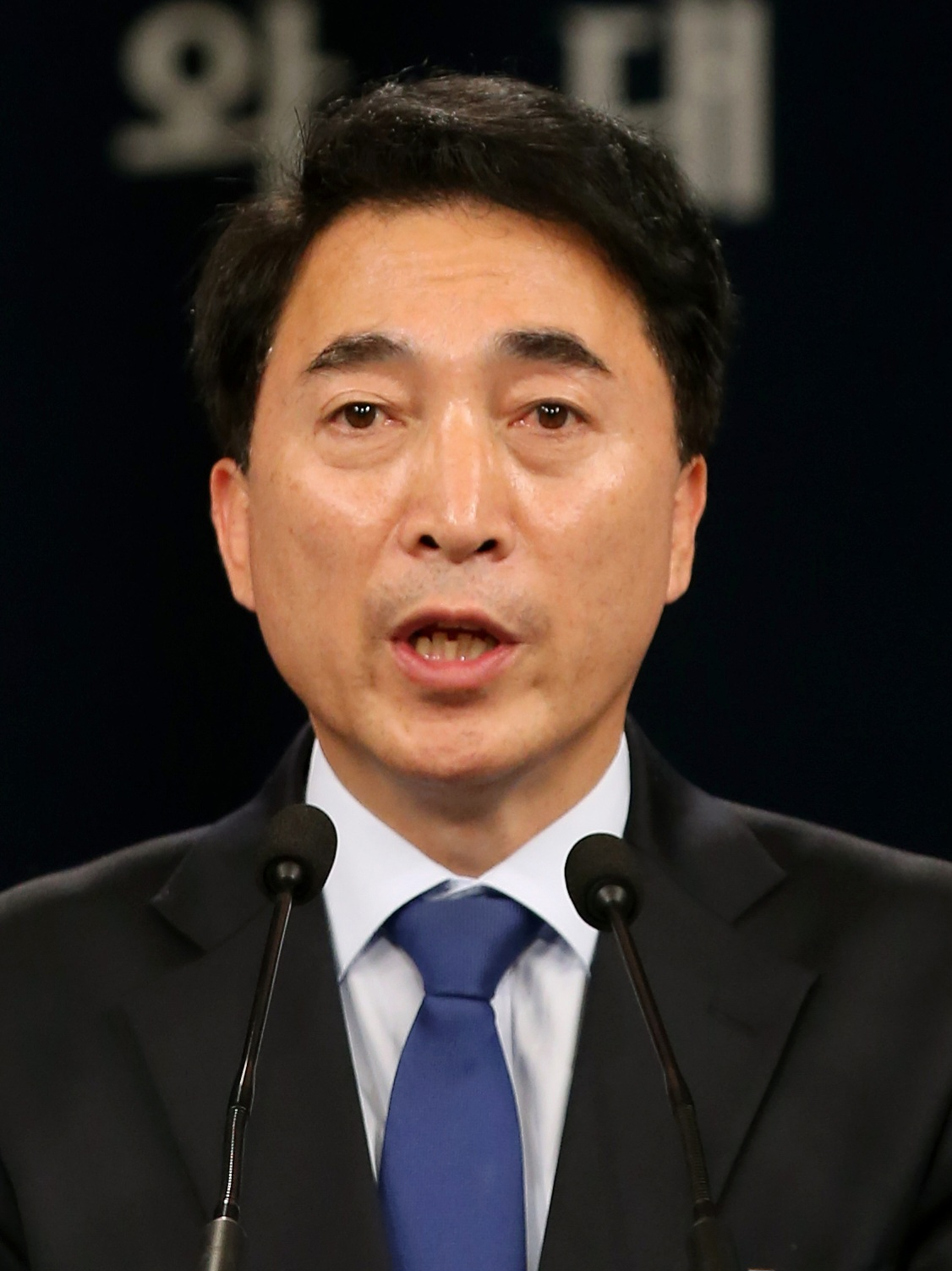
- Incumbent; Park Soo-hyun since 1 July 2026
- Term length: Four years
- Inaugural holder: Hwang In-shik
- Formation: 3 November 1945; 81 years ago
- Website: www.chungnam.go.kr/governor

The Governor of South Chungcheong Province (Korean: 충청남도지사; Hanja: 忠淸南道知事) is the head of the local government of South Chungcheong Province who is elected to a four-year term.

== List of governors ==
=== Appointed governors (before 1995) ===
From 1945 to 1995, the Governor of South Chungcheong Province was appointed by the President of the Republic of Korea.

=== Directly elected governors (1995–present) ===
Since 1995, under provisions of the revised Local Government Act, the Governor of South Chungcheong Province is elected by direct election.

Political parties
Conservative
Liberal
Independent
Status
Denotes acting governor

Term	Portrait	Name (Birth–Death)	Term of office			Political party	Elected
Term	Portrait	Name (Birth–Death)	Took office	Left office	Time in office	Political party	Elected
1st		Sim Dae-pyung 심대평 沈大平 (born 1941)	1 July 1995	24 March 2006	10 years, 267 days	United Liberal Democrats → People First	1995
2nd		Sim Dae-pyung 심대평 沈大平 (born 1941)	1 July 1995	24 March 2006	10 years, 267 days	United Liberal Democrats → People First	1998
3rd		Sim Dae-pyung 심대평 沈大平 (born 1941)	1 July 1995	24 March 2006	10 years, 267 days	United Liberal Democrats → People First	2002
3rd		Yoo Deok-joon 유덕준 兪德濬 (born 1946); Acting	24 March 2006	30 June 2006	99 days	Independent	—
4th		Lee Wan-koo 이완구 李完九 (1950–2021)	1 July 2006	4 December 2009	3 years, 157 days	Grand National	2006
4th		Lee In-hwa 이인화 李仁禾 (born 1954); Acting	4 December 2009	30 June 2010	209 days	Independent	—
5th		Ahn Hee-jung 안희정 安熙正 (born 1964)	1 July 2010	6 March 2018	7 years, 249 days	Democratic ('08) → Democratic United → Democratic ('13) → NPAD → Democratic ('15)	2010
6th		Ahn Hee-jung 안희정 安熙正 (born 1964)	1 July 2010	6 March 2018	7 years, 249 days	Democratic ('08) → Democratic United → Democratic ('13) → NPAD → Democratic ('15)	2014
6th		Namkoong Young 남궁영 南宮英 (born 1962); Acting	7 March 2018	30 June 2018	116 days	Independent	—
7th		Yang Seung-jo 양승조 梁承晁 (born 1959)	1 July 2018	30 June 2022	4 years, 0 days	Democratic	2018
8th		Kim Tae-heum 김태흠 金泰欽 (born 1962)	1 July 2022	30 June 2026	4 years, 0 days	People Power	2022
9th		Park Soo-hyun 박수현 朴洙賢 (born 1964)	1 July 2026	Incumbent	136 days	Democratic	2026

== Elections ==
=== 1995 ===
1995 South Chungcheong gubernatorial election
Party	#	Candidate	Votes	Percentage
United Liberal Democrats	3	Sim Dae-pyung	616,006	67.88%
Democratic Liberal	1	Park Joong-bae	174,117	19.18%
Democratic	2	Cho Joong-youn	117,300	12.92%
Total			907,423	100.00%
Voter turnout			73.77%	

=== 1998 ===
1998 South Chungcheong gubernatorial election
Party	#	Candidate	Votes	Percentage
United Liberal Democrats	3	Sim Dae-pyung	656,795	84.63%
Grand National	1	Han Chung-soo	119,216	15.36%
Total			776,011	100.00%
Voter turnout			59.49%	

=== 2002 ===
2002 South Chungcheong gubernatorial election
Party	#	Candidate	Votes	Percentage
United Liberal Democrats	3	Sim Dae-pyung	508,796	66.96%
Grand National	1	Park Tae-kwon	251,005	33.03%
Total			759,801	100.00%
Voter turnout			56.24%	

=== 2006 ===
2006 South Chungcheong gubernatorial election
Party	#	Candidate	Votes	Percentage
Grand National	2	Lee Wan-koo	379,420	46.31%
People First	5	Lee Myung-soo	209,254	25.54%
Uri	1	Oh Young-kyo	178,169	21.74%
Democratic Labor	4	Lee Yong-gil	52,417	6.39%
Total			819,260	100.00%
Voter turnout			55.78%	

=== 2010 ===
2010 South Chungcheong gubernatorial election
Party	#	Candidate	Votes	Percentage
Democratic	2	Ahn Hee-jung	367,288	42.25%
Liberty Forward	3	Park Sang-don	347,265	39.94%
Grand National	1	Park Hae-chun	154,723	17.79%
Total			869,276	100.00%
Voter turnout			56.52%	

=== 2014 ===
2014 South Chungcheong gubernatorial election
Party	#	Candidate	Votes	Percentage
NPAD	2	Ahn Hee-jung	465,994	52.21%
Saenuri	1	Chung Jin-suk	392,315	43.95%
Independent	4	Kim Ki-moon	34,204	3.83%
Total			892,513	100.00%
Voter turnout			55.71%	

=== 2018 ===
2018 South Chungcheong gubernatorial election
Party	#	Candidate	Votes	Percentage
Democratic	1	Yang Seung-jo	615,870	62.55%
Liberty Korea	2	Lee In-je	345,577	35.10%
Let's go Korea	6	Cha Gook-hwan	23,012	2.33%
Total			984,459	100.00%
Voter turnout			58.12%	

=== 2022 ===
2022 South Chungcheong gubernatorial election
Party	#	Candidate	Votes	Percentage
People Power	2	Kim Tae-heum	468,658	53.87%
Democratic	1	Yang Seung-jo	401,308	46.12%
Chungcheong's Future	3	Choi Gi-bok (Note: Withdrew 31 May 2022 and endorsed the Democratic candidate.)	N/A	N/A
Total			869,966	100.00%
Voter turnout			49.82%	
Total			869,966	100.00%
Voter turnout			49.82%	

=== 2026 ===
Candidate	Party	Votes	%
Park Soo-hyun	Democratic Party	563,507	52.53
Kim Tae-heum (incumbent)	People Power Party	509,167	47.47
Total		1,072,674	100.00
Valid votes		1,072,674	98.25
Invalid/blank votes		19,126	1.75
Total votes		1,091,800	100.00
Registered voters/turnout		1,857,239	58.79
Democratic gain from People Power			

== See also ==
- Government of South Korea
- Politics of South Korea
