= Nonsan–Gyeryong–Geumsan =

Constituency in South Chungcheong, South Korea

- Single-member constituency for the National Assembly
- Location of the constituency
- District(s): Nonsan; Gyeryong; Geumsan County
- Region: South Chungcheong
- Electorate: 180,091 (2024)

Current constituency
- Created: 2004
- Seats: 1
- Party: Democratic Party
- Member: Hwang Myeong-seon
- Created from: Nonsan–Geumsan

Nonsan–Gyeryong–Geumsan (Korean: 논산시·계룡시·금산군) is a constituency of the National Assembly of South Korea. The constituency consists of Nonsan, Gyeryong, and Geumsan County. As of 2024, 180,091 eligible voters were registered in the constituency. The constituency was created in 2004 from the Nonsan–Geumsan constituency.

== History ==
The constituency was first contested in the 2004 South Korean legislative election. Lee In-je of the centrist-liberal United Liberal Democrats won election, securing 44.85% of the vote. Lee ran as an independent candidate in 2008 and won re-election with only 27.67% of the vote which was the lowest percentage for a winning candidate in the entire election. He was re-elected in 2012 as a member of the right-wing Liberty Forward Party, narrowly beating out Kim Jong-min of the liberal Democratic United Party by less than three points. However, in the subsequent election held in 2016, Kim Jong-min of the liberal Democratic Party narrowly beat Lee In-je by 1,308 votes. Kim won re-election in 2020.

On March 8, 2024, incumbent Kim Jong-min announced his intention to run for the Sejong A constituency. Kim had previously left the Democratic Party on January 10, 2024, citing ideological differences with leader Lee Jae-myung. Kim was succeeded by Hwang Myeong-seon of the Democratic Party, who won with 50.84% of the vote.

== Boundaries ==
The constituency encompasses the entirety of Nonsan, Gyeryong and Geumsan County located in South Chungcheong Province.

== List of members of the National Assembly ==
Election	Member	Party	Dates	Notes
2004	Lee In-je	United Liberal Democrats	2004–2016	Minister of Labor (1993) Governor of Gyeonggi Province (1995–1997)
2008	Lee In-je	Independent	2004–2016	Minister of Labor (1993) Governor of Gyeonggi Province (1995–1997)
2012	Lee In-je	Liberty Forward	2004–2016	Minister of Labor (1993) Governor of Gyeonggi Province (1995–1997)
2016	Kim Jong-min	Democratic	2016–2024	vice presidential spokesperson (2004) presidential spokesperson (2004–2005); Deputy Governor of South Chungcheong Province (2010–2011); Left the Democratic Party on January 10, 2024, Joined the New Future Party on February 4, 2024; co-leader of the New Future Party (2024); Floor leader of the New Future (2024)
2020	Kim Jong-min	Democratic	2016–2024	vice presidential spokesperson (2004) presidential spokesperson (2004–2005); Deputy Governor of South Chungcheong Province (2010–2011); Left the Democratic Party on January 10, 2024, Joined the New Future Party on February 4, 2024; co-leader of the New Future Party (2024); Floor leader of the New Future (2024)
2024	Hwang Myeong-seon	Democratic	2024–present	Mayor of Nonsan (2010–2022)

== Election results ==
=== 2024 ===
Legislative Election 2024: Nonsan–Gyeryong–Geumsan
Party	Candidate	Votes	%	±%
Democratic	Hwang Myeong-seon	61,146	50.84	▼0.17
People Power	Park Sung-kyu	56,706	47.15	▲0.81
Independent	Lee Chang-won	2,406	2.00	new
Rejected ballots		1,423	–	
Turnout		121,681	67.56	▲3.77
Registered electors		180,091		
Democratic gain from New Future		Swing		

=== 2020 ===
Legislative Election 2020: Nonsan–Gyeryong–Geumsan
Party	Candidate	Votes	%	±%
Democratic	Kim Jong-min	58,319	51.01	+7.46
United Future	Park Woo-seok	52,984	46.34	+3.79
Minsaeng	Han Min-hee	1,762	1.54	new
National Revolutionary	Myeong So-yoon	1,261	1.10	new
Rejected ballots		1,873	–	
Turnout		116,199	63.79	+5.86
Registered electors		182,155		
Democratic hold		Swing		

=== 2016 ===
Legislative Election 2016: Nonsan–Gyeryong–Geumsan
Party	Candidate	Votes	%	±%
Democratic	Kim Jong-min	45,203	43.55	+3.70
Saenuri	Lee In-je	44,165	42.55	+0.19
People	Lee Hwan-sik	14,417	13.89	new
Rejected ballots		1,639	–	
Turnout		105,424	57.93	+4.69
Registered electors		181,987		
Democratic gain from Saenuri		Swing		

=== 2012 ===
Legislative Election 2012: Nonsan–Gyeryong–Geumsan
Party	Candidate	Votes	%	±%
Liberty Forward	Lee In-je	40,076	42.36	−14.69
Democratic United	Kim Jong-min	37,701	39.85	+22.29
Saenuri	Lee Chang-won	16,827	17.78	−3.02
Rejected ballots		1,362	–	
Turnout		95,966	53.24	−2.44
Registered electors		180,248		
Liberty Forward hold		Swing		

=== 2008 ===
Legislative Election 2008: Nonsan–Gyeryong–Geumsan
Party	Candidate	Votes	%	±%
Independent	Lee In-je	23,595	27.67	−17.18
Grand National	Kim Young-gap	17,739	20.80	+10.13
United Democratic	Yang Seung-sook	14,974	17.56	−21.90
Pro-Park	Shim Jung-soo	11,209	13.15	new
Liberty Forward	Shin Sam-cheol	10,454	12.26	–
Independent	Kim Bum-myung	5,400	6.33	new
Family Party for Peace and Unity	Lee Min-joo	1,896	2.22	new
Rejected ballots		1,135	–	
Turnout		86,402	50.80	−5.26
Registered electors		170,075		
Independent hold		Swing		

=== 2004 ===
Legislative Election 2004: Nonsan–Gyeryong–Geumsan
Party	Candidate	Votes	%	±%
United Liberal Democrats	Lee In-je	42,242	44.85	–
Uri	Yang Seung-sook	37,163	39.46	–
Grand National	Park Woo-seok	10,053	10.67	–
Democratic Labor	Yoon Chang-soon	2,504	2.66	–
Independent	Kim Hyeon-sook	2,220	2.36	–
Rejected ballots		1,539	–	
Turnout		95,721	56.06	–
Registered electors		170,756		
United Liberal Democrats win (new seat)				

== See also ==
- List of constituencies of the National Assembly of South Korea
