= Lee In-je =

South Korean judge and politician

- 이인제
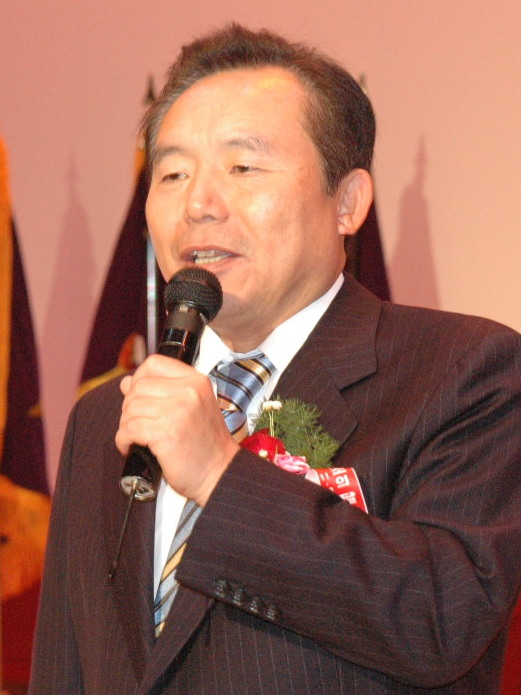
- Lee in 2006

Governor of Gyeonggi Province
- In office 1 July 1995 – 18 September 1997
- Preceded by: Lee Hae-jae
- Succeeded by: Lim Su-bok (acting); Lim Chang-yeol

Member of the National Assembly
- In office 30 May 1988 – 7 June 1995
- In office 30 May 2000 – 29 May 2016

Minister of Labor
- In office 26 February 1993 – 21 December 1993

Personal details
- Born: 11 December 1948 (age 77) Nonsan, South Chungcheong Province, South Korea
- Party: Reunification Democratic (1987–1990); Democratic Liberal (1990–1995); New Korea (1995–1997); National Congress (1998–2000); Democratic (2000–2002, 2007–2008); Independent (2005–2006); United Democratic (2008); Independent (2008–2011); Saenuri·Liberty Korea (2012–2020); United Future·People Power (2020–present)
- Other political affiliations: New National (1997–1998); United Liberal Democrats (2002–2005); People First (2006–2007); Liberty Forward (2011–2012)
- Spouse: Kim Eun-sook
- Education: Seoul National University

- Lee In-je
- Hangul: 이인제
- Hanja: 李仁濟
- RR: I Inje
- MR: I Inje

Lee In-je (Korean: 이인제; born 11 December 1948) is a South Korean politician and a former judge who served as the Governor of Gyeonggi Province from 1995 to 1997.

== Political career ==
He was born in Nonsan, South Chungcheong Province and graduated from Seoul National University. In 1988, he entered politics after having been elected to the National Assembly. He also served as the first Minister of Labor in President Kim Young-sam's administration in 1993, and the governor of Gyeonggi Province from 1995 to 1997.

In 1997, he was defeated by Lee Hoi-chang in the New Korea Party's election to choose its presidential candidate. Afterwards, he resigned from the party to create the New National Party to launch his ultimately unsuccessful run for the presidency. In 2002, he was one of the leading contenders to run for president as the nominee of the Millennium Democratic Party but resigned after being defeated by the ultimate presidential victor Roh Moo-hyun. In 2007, Rhee again ran for president as the nominee of the Democratic Party but was defeated by Grand National Party candidate Lee Myung-bak. He has stayed active in politics and in July 2014 was elected to the Supreme Council of Saenuri Party, then ruling party of the Republic of Korea. He has a special nickname: Phoenikje [a combination of Phoenix and (Rhee in) JE]. The nickname derives from his ability to change political party affiliation 16 times and be elected to the National Assembly a total of six times despite numerous past defeats in presidential elections and the fall of his affiliated parties. He ran for governor of South Chungcheong Province in the 2018 local elections but lost to Yang Seung-jo of the Democratic Party of Korea.

== Election results ==
Year	Elections	Constituency	Political party	Votes (%)	Results
1988	13th National Assembly General Election	Anyang A (Gyeonggi)	RDP	29,325 (32.59%)	Won
1992	14th National Assembly General Election	Anyang A (Gyeonggi)	DLP	39,232 (35.82%)	Won
1995	1st Iocal Election	Gyeonggi (Governoral Elections)	DLP	1,264,914 (40.56%)	Won
1997	1997 Presidential Election	South Korea	New National	4,925,591 (19.20%)	Defeated (3rd)
2000	16th National Assembly General Election	Nonsan–Geumsan (South Chungcheong)	MDP	66,957 (65.37%)	Won
2004	17th National Assembly General Election	Nonsan–Gyeryong–Geumsan (South Chungcheong)	ULD	42,242 (44.85%)	Won
2007	2007 Presidential Election	South Korea	Democratic	160,707 (0.68%)	Defeated (6th)
2008	18th National Assembly General Election	Nonsan–Gyeryong–Geumsan (South Chungcheong)	Independent	23,595 (27.67%)	Won
2012	19th National Assembly General Election	Nonsan–Gyeryong–Geumsan (South Chungcheong)	LFP	40,076 (42.36%)	Won
2016	20th National Assembly General Election	Nonsan–Gyeryong–Geumsan (South Chungcheong)	Saenuri	44,165 (42.55%)	Defeated (2nd)
2018	7th Iocal Election	South Chungcheong (Governoral Elections)	LKP	345,577 (35.10%)	Defeated (2nd)

Political offices
Preceded by Lee Yeon-taek	Minister of Labor; 25 February 1993–21 December 1993	Succeeded by Nam Jae-hee
Preceded by Lee Hae-jae	Governor of Gyeonggi Province; 1 July 1995–18 September 1997	Succeeded by Lim Su-bok (Acting); Lim Chang-yeol
National Assembly of the Republic of Korea
Preceded by Lee Taek-don, Yoon Guk-Roh (Anyang City–Gwangmyeong City–Siheung City–Ongjin County, Gyeonggi)	Member of the National Assembly from Anyang City A (Gyeonggi); 30 May 1988–7 June 1995	Succeeded by Kwon Soo-chang (Anyang City Manan District, Gyeonggi)
Preceded by Kim Bum-myung	Member of the National Assembly from Nosan City–Geumsan County (South Chungcheong); 30 May 2000–29 May 2004	Succeeded by Himself (Nosan City–Gyeryong City–Geumsan County, South Chungcheong)
Preceded by Himself (Nonsan City–Geumsan County, South Chungcheong)	Member of the National Assembly from Nosan City–Gyeryong City–Geumsan County (South Chungcheong); 30 May 2004–29 May 2016	Succeeded by Kim Jong-min
Party political offices
Preceded by Kim Jong-pil	Acting President of the United Liberal Democrats; 16 April 2004–20 April 2004	Succeeded by Cho Bu-young (Acting)
Preceded by Kim Nak-sung (Acting)	Interim Chairman of the Liberty Forward Party; 16 April 2012–29 May 2012	Succeeded by Himself (Chairman of the Advancement Unification Party)
Preceded by Sim Dae-pyung (Chairman of the Liberty Forward Party); Kim Nak-sung (Acting); Himself (Interim)	Chairman of the Advancement Unification Party; 29 May 2012–16 November 2012	Succeeded by Office abolished
Preceded by New Office	New National nominee for President of South Korea; 1997	Succeeded by Office abolished
Preceded by Roh Moo-hyun (Millennium Democratic Party nominee President South Korea)	Democratic Party nominee for President of South Korea; 2007	Succeeded by Moon Jae-in (Democratic United Party nominee President South Korea)
