= Kim Jong-min (politician) =

South Korean politician (born 1964)

- 김종민
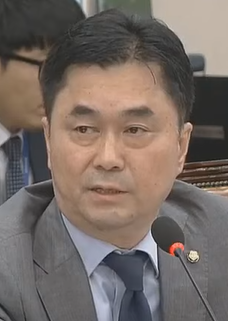

Leader of the New Future Party
- In office 4 February 2024 – 18 April 2024 Co-leading with Lee Nak-yon
- Preceded by: Party established
- Succeeded by: Lee Seok-hyun (Interim); Jun Byung-hun

Member of the National Assembly
- Incumbent
- Assumed office 30 May 2024
- Preceded by: Hong Seong-Kuk
- Constituency: Sejong A (Sejong)
- In office 30 May 2016 – 29 May 2024
- Preceded by: Lee In-je
- Succeeded by: Hwang Myeong-seon
- Constituency: Nonsan–Gyeryong–Geumsan (South Chungcheong)

Vice Governor for Political Affairs of South Chungcheong Province
- In office 5 July 2010 – 14 September 2011
- Governor: Ahn Hee-jung
- Preceded by: Chae Hoon
- Succeeded by: Kwon Hee-tae

Presidential Spokesperson
- In office 30 June 2004 – 17 May 2005
- President: Roh Moo-hyun
- Preceded by: Yoon Tae-young
- Succeeded by: Kim Man-soo

Personal details
- Born: 12 May 1964 (age 62) Nonsan, South Korea
- Party: Democratic (before 2024); New Future (2024); Independent (2024-)
- Education: Seoul National University

Kim Jong-min (Korean: 김종민; Hanja: 金鍾民; born 12 May 1964) is a South Korean politician representing the constituency of Nonsan–Gyeryong–Geumsan in the National Assembly from 2016.

== Before entering politics ==
Kim studied Korean Language and Literature at Seoul National University. After graduating college, Kim worked as a political journalist for newspapers—daily Naeil (내일신문) and weekly Sisajournal (시사저널)—during which he met then-presidential hopeful Roh Moo-hyun.

== Early political career ==
Kim first joined politics in 2003 when he started working as one of the administrators at Office of Senior Secretary for Public Affairs to the President Roh (홍보수석비서관실). He continued working for Roh until the end of Roh's term. In 2004 he was promoted to vice presidential spokesperson and a month later to the Roh's third presidential spokesperson becoming the youngest person to assume this post at the age of 40. Kim was Roh's first spokesperson after Roh returned to the office following Constitutional Court's ruling which turned down his impeachment voted by the parliament. In 2005 he was reshuffled to secretary for public affairs and served till the end of Roh's presidency in 2008. After serving at the Blue House for the entire Roh's presidency of five years, Kim joined in developing and running the online debate platform of Roh's supporters, "Democracy 2.0" which operated only for a short period due to Roh's suicide.

He later joined Ahn Hee-jung, then-elected governor of South Chungcheong Province, whom he first met at university as his first deputy. He resigned from the post for the 2012 general election.

== National Assembly member ==
In the 2016 general election, Kim defeated a six-term parliamentarian, a former presidential candidate with a nickname "phoenix" Lee In-je who defeated Kim in the previous 2012 election. Since then he took multiple roles in his party such as vice chair of its Policy Planning Committee from 2015 to 2017 and deputy floor leader from 2018 to 2019.

In July 2020 he announced his campaign to become one of five elected members of his party's Supreme Council. In August 2020 he was elected as a Supreme Council member for a fixed term of two years receiving the most votes from party members among 8 candidates.

From September 2020 Kim chairs party's task force for reforming "power institutions" such as prosecution, police and intelligence agencies and from October 2020 its committee to reform the party itself.

== Electoral history ==
Election	Year	District	Party affiliation	Votes	Percentage of votes	Results
19th General Election	2012	Nonsan–Gyeryong–Geumsan (South Chungcheong)	Democratic United Party	37,701	39.85%	Lost (2nd)
20th General Election	2016	Nonsan–Gyeryong–Geumsan (South Chungcheong)	Democratic Party	45,203	43.55%	Won
21st General Election	2020	Nonsan–Gyeryong–Geumsan (South Chungcheong)	Democratic Party	58,319	51.01%	Won
22nd General Election	2024	Sejong A (Sejong)	New Future Party	65,599	56.93%	Won

== Awards ==
- Order of Service Merit by the government of South Korea (2006)
