= Kang Byeong-gi =

South Korean politician (1960–2021)

- 강병기

Leader of the Unified Progressive Party
- Emergency Response Committee
- In office 16 September 2012 – 23 February 2013
- Preceded by: Kang Gi-gap; Min Byung-ryul (acting)
- Succeeded by: Lee Jung-hee

Vice Governor for Political Affairs of South Gyeongsang Province
- In office 5 July 2010 – 28 October 2011
- Governor: Kim Doo-kwan
- Preceded by: Ahn Sang-geun
- Succeeded by: Heo Seong-mu

Personal details
- Born: 5 August 1960
- Died: 28 January 2021 (aged 60) Gyeongsang National University Hospital
- Party: Progressive Party (2017–2021)
- Other political affiliations: New People's Party (2017); Unified Progressive Party (2011–2014); Democratic Labor Party (2000–2010, 2011); Independent (1999–2000, 2010–2011); Construction National Victory 21 (1997–1999)

Kang Byeong-gi (Korean: 강병기, 15 September 1960 – 28 January 2021) was a South Korean politician and a prominent progressive figure from South Gyeongsang Province. He served as Vice Governor for Political Affairs of South Gyeongsang Province during the fifth popularly elected administration.

== History ==
Kang Byeong-gi had planned to run for a seat in the 2004 South Korean legislative election, but his candidacy was blocked because he had received a suspended sentence for his role in the National Farmers Representatives Rally, which opposed the Korea-Chile Free Trade Agreement in 2001, whilst serving as the political committee chair of the Korean Peasants League, and he had not been granted a pardon or reinstatement of his civil rights. He previously served as a supreme council member of the Democratic Labor Party.

He later ran in the 2008 South Korean legislative election in Jeonju B but was unsuccessful. Subsequently, he ran for Governor of South Gyeongsang Province in the 2010 South Korean local elections. However, he helped secure a victory for the opposition bloc in the province by joining forces with independent gubernatorial candidate Kim Doo-kwan.

Following the election, he served as Vice Governor for Political Affairs of South Gyeongsang Province. In 2012, he was appointed as emergency response committee chairperson of the Unified Progressive Party.

He died on 28 January 2021, following his collapse from a cerebral infarction and cerebral haemorrhage on the 14th.

== Education ==
- Attended Busan Yeonji Elementary School in 1967.
- Attended Jinju Daegok Middle School in 1972.
- Attended Daegok High School.
- Attended Pusan National University in 1978 and enrolled in the College of Engineering.

== Electoral history ==
Year	Election	Assembly	Office	Constituency	Party	Votes	Vote share	Rank	Result
2008	2008 South Korean legislative election	18th	Member of the National Assembly	Jinju B, South Gyeongsang	Democratic Labor Party	11,975	19.85%	2nd	Lost
2012	2012 South Korean legislative election	19th	Member of the National Assembly	Jinju B, South Gyeongsang	Unified Progressive Party		0%		Withdrew
2014	2014 South Korean local elections	36th	Governor	South Gyeongsang Province	Unified Progressive Party	79,015	5.09%	3rd	Lost
