= Hyun Ae-ja =

South Korean politician (born 1962)

- 현애자

Member of the National Assembly
- In office 30 May 2004 – 29 May 2008
- Constituency: Proportional representation

Personal details
- Born: 28 October 1962 (age 64)
- Party: Justice Party
- Other political affiliations: Democratic Labor Party

Hyun Ae-ja (Korean: 현애자, 28 October 1962) is a South Korean politician.

== Political career ==
In the 1980s, she began working as a farmer. During this period, she became involved in the farmers' movement. Her involvement in farming led to significant debt and was the most heavily indebted member of the 17th National Assembly. During her term she served on the Health and Welfare Committee. In 2007, she also staged a hunger strike lasting 27 days to protest the militarisation of Jeju Island. In 2004, she was elected as a proportional representation member of the National Assembly for the Democratic Labor Party.

== Election results ==
Year	Election	Legislature	Position	Constituency	Party	Votes	Vote share	Ranking	Result	Notes
2004	2004 South Korean legislative election	17th	Member of the National Assembly	Proportional representation	Democratic Labor Party	2,774,061	13.03%	7th on proportional representation list	Elected	First term
2008	2008 South Korean legislative election	18th	Member of the National Assembly	Seogwipo City, Jeju	Democratic Labor Party	7,649	11.53%	3rd	Lost	
