= KDLP =

KDLP may refer to:

- Democratic Labor Party (South Korea)
- KDLP-LP, a low-power radio station (104.7 FM) licensed to Ace, Texas, United States
- KDLP (Korean English Dual Language Program),

an English immersion early childhood language academy in Seongnam, South Korea
