= 2007 Shepway District Council election =

2007 UK local government election

Results of the 2007 Shepway District Council election

District Council elections were held in Shepway on 3 May 2007.

== Results summary ==
Shepway District Council Election Results 2007
Party	Seats	Gains	Losses	Net gain/loss	Seats %	Votes %	Votes	+/−
Conservative	34	17	1	+16	74.0			
Liberal Democrats	10	6	8	-2	22.0			
People First Party	2	0	8	-8	4.0			
Shepway Independents	0	0	2	-2	0.0			
BNP	0	0	0	0	0.0			
Green	0	0	1	-1	0.0		0	0
Independent	0	0	1	-1	0.0		0	0
Labour	0	0	0	0	0.0			
UKIP	0	0	0	0	0.0			

== Results by Ward ==
- Denotes sitting Councillor.

=== Dymchurch & St Mary's Bay (3) ===
Dymchurch & St Mary's Bay
Party	Candidate	Votes	%	±%
Conservative	Alan Clifton-Holt	985	53.9	+23.3
Conservative	Russel Tilson	846	46.3	+19.0
Conservative	Olwyn Williams	799	43.8	+19.9
Shepway Independents	Tom Gibbs	562	30.8	N/A
Liberal Democrats	Julie White*	474	26.0	−20.9
Shepway Independents	Ian Meyers	456	25.0	N/A
Shepway Independents	Michael Hewton	439	24.0	N/A
Liberal Democrats	Brian Wright	431	23.6	−21.6
People First Party	Shirley Maile*	290	15.9	N/A
People First Party	Nicholas Day	196	10.7	N/A
Turnout		1826		
Conservative gain from Liberal Democrats		Swing		
Conservative gain from Liberal Democrats		Swing		
Conservative gain from Liberal Democrats		Swing		

Shirley Maile was elected for the Liberal Democrats in 2003, but sought re-election for the People First Party. She would ultimately fail to win re-election.

=== Elham & Stelling Minnis (1) ===
Elham & Stelling Minnis
Party	Candidate	Votes	%	±%
Conservative	Pam Carr	619	70.1	+23.5
Independent	Andrew Barchi	155	17.6	N/A
Liberal Democrats	Sally Matthews	109	12.3	−41.1
Majority		464	52.5	+45.7
Turnout		883		
Conservative gain from Liberal Democrats		Swing		

=== Elham Valley Division ===
Elham and Stelling Minnis 3 May 2007 Elham Valley Division
Party	Candidate	Votes	%	±%
Conservative	Pam Carr (E)	619		
Independent	Andrew Barchi	155		
Liberal Democrats	Sally Matthews	109		
Majority		464		
Turnout		890	53.58	
Conservative gain from Liberal Democrats		Swing		

Carol Crees had been elected as a Lib Dem in 2003 but defected to People First in 2004. She sought re-election in Folkestone East ward.

=== Folkestone North East Division ===
Folkestone East (2 members) 3 May 2007 Folkestone North East Division
Party	Candidate	Votes	%	±%
Conservative	Alan North *(E)	345		
Liberal Democrats	Tony Dunning (E)	319		
Liberal Democrats	Martin Salmon	313		
Conservative	Gordon Williams	297		
People First Party	Janet Kay Andrews *	276		
People First Party	Carolyn Court Crees *	226		
Labour	Jo Knight	93		
Labour	Stevie Makins	83		
Majority		6		
Turnout		1043	34.35	
Conservative gain from Liberal Democrats		Swing		
Liberal Democrats hold		Swing		

Cllr Alan North had gained the seat for the Conservatives at a by-election in 2004. Janet Andrews had been elected as a Lib Dem in 2003 but defected to People First in 2004. Carol Crees has been elected as a Lib Dem in Elham and Stelling Minnis ward in 2003 but defected to People First in 2004. Cllr Tony Dunning now sits as a Conservative.

Folkestone Foord (2 members) 3 May 2007 Folkestone North East Division
Party	Candidate	Votes	%	±%
People First Party	Brian William Copping *(E)	555		
People First Party	Paul Albert Roy Marsh *(E)	532		
Liberal Democrats	Maureen Speller	416		
Liberal Democrats	Alex McNeice	386		
Conservative	Cherilyn Williams	149		
Conservative	John Worthy	124		
Majority		116		
Turnout		1145	34.58	
People First Party gain from Liberal Democrats		Swing		
People First Party gain from Liberal Democrats		Swing		

Cllrs Paul Marsh and Brian Copping were both elected as Lib Dems in 2003 and defected to People First in 2004.

Folkestone Park (3 members) 3 May 2007 Folkestone North East Division
Party	Candidate	Votes	%	±%
Liberal Democrats	Lynne Beaumont *(E)	684		
Conservative	David Johnson (E)	624		
Conservative	Dick Pascoe (E)	614		
Conservative	John Collier	594		
Liberal Democrats	Maggie Barrett	581		
Liberal Democrats	Bev Rolfe	555		
Independent	Ann Elizabeth Berry	384		
Shepway Independents	Edwina Boyt	293		
People First Party	Patricia Copping	174		
Shepway Independents	Martin Highland	135		
People First Party	William John Fagg	122		
UKIP	Carol Lynn Sacre	111		
People First Party	Richard Eric Green	104		
Majority		20		
Turnout		1793	39.24	
Liberal Democrats hold		Swing		
Conservative gain from Liberal Democrats		Swing		
Conservative gain from Liberal Democrats		Swing		

=== Folkestone South Division ===
Folkestone Harbour (2 members) 3 May 2007 Folkestone South Division
Party	Candidate	Votes	%	±%
Liberal Democrats	Emily Jane Sanger (E)	499		
Liberal Democrats	Sue Wallace (E)	496		
Conservative	George Burr	236		
Conservative	Alice Monk	215		
People First Party	Kim Culshaw *	160		
People First Party	Michael Edward Edson	143		
BNP	Derek James	139		
BNP	Harry Herbert John Williams	126		
Labour	Paul Bingham	114		
Labour	Wendy Mitchell	102		
Majority		239		
Turnout		1168	36.16	
Liberal Democrats hold		Swing		
Liberal Democrats hold		Swing		

Kim Culshaw had been elected as a Lib Dem in 2003 but defected to People First in 2004. Cllrs Emily Sanger and Sue Wallace now sit as Conservatives.

Folkestone Harvey Central (2 members) 3 May 2007 Folkestone South Division
Party	Candidate	Votes	%	±%
Conservative	Hugh Barker *(E)	581		
Conservative	Philip Martin *(E)	487		
Liberal Democrats	Gary Mark Fuller	465		
Liberal Democrats	Troy Peter Scaum	400		
Majority		22		
Turnout		1087	31.51	
Conservative hold		Swing		
Conservative gain from Liberal Democrats		Swing		

Richard Green had been elected as a Lib Dem in 2003, before defecting to People First and then Greens 4 Shepway in 2004 and then standing down from the council. He stood for election in Folkestone Park on the People First platform. Cllr Philip Martin had gained the seat for the Conservatives in the ensuing by-election.

Folkestone Harvey West (2 members) 3 May 2007 Folkestone South Division
Party	Candidate	Votes	%	±%
Conservative	George Bunting *(E)	865		
Conservative	Rory Cassian Love *(E)	861		
Shepway Independents	Rachael Sophia Jessie Bailey	209		
Shepway Independents	Roy Edward Brightman	198		
Liberal Democrats	Christopher Lee	181		
Liberal Democrats	Hugh Robertson-Ritchie	178		
UKIP	Margaret Rita Kendall	94		
Majority		652		
Turnout		1349	41.93	
Conservative hold		Swing		
Conservative hold		Swing		

=== Folkestone West Division ===
Folkestone Cheriton (3 members) 3 May 2007 Folkestone West Division
Party	Candidate	Votes	%	±%
Liberal Democrats	Peter Gane *(E)	725		
Liberal Democrats	Peter Carroll (E)	711		
Liberal Democrats	Tim Prater (E)	673		
Conservative	Geoffrey Boot	433		
Conservative	Suzie Boot	432		
Conservative	Harvey Marshall	420		
People First Party	Trevor Buss *	366		
People First Party	Linda Cufley *	328		
People First Party	Paul Stevens	298		
Majority		240		
Turnout		1587	34.10	
Liberal Democrats hold		Swing		
Liberal Democrats hold		Swing		
Liberal Democrats hold		Swing		

Trevor Buss and Linda Cufley had been elected as a Lib Dem in 2003 but defected to People First in 2004. Cllr Peter Gane now sits as a Conservative.

Folkestone Morehall (2 members) 3 May 2007 Folkestone West Division
Party	Candidate	Votes	%	±%
Liberal Democrats	Tom McNeice (E)	571		
Conservative	Peter Monk (E)	537		
Conservative	Rodica Wheeler	527		
Liberal Democrats	Darren Edward Briddock	496		
Labour	Chris Walters	123		
Labour	Pam Stevens	90		
Majority		10		
Turnout		1255	41.56	
Liberal Democrats hold		Swing		
Conservative gain from Liberal Democrats		Swing		

Tony Baker had been elected as a Liberal Democrat in 2003, but defected to Independent in 2004 and did not seek re-election. Gary George had been elected as a Liberal Democrat in 2003, but defected to People First in 2004 and did not seek re-election.

Folkestone Sandgate (2 members) 3 May 2007 Folkestone West Division
Party	Candidate	Votes	%	±%
Conservative	Robert Bliss *(E)	613		
Conservative	Jan Holben (E)	591		
Independent	Joy Fiona MacMillan *	370		
Independent	Jonathan Greenwall	327		
Liberal Democrats	Elma Vera Crocker	142		
Liberal Democrats	Season Prater	138		
Majority		221		
Turnout		1134	36.23	
Conservative hold		Swing		
Conservative hold		Swing		

Joy MacMillan had been elected as a Conservative but resigned the whip in 2006 and sought re-election as an Independent

=== Hythe Division ===
Hythe Central (3 members) 3 May 2007 Hythe Division
Party	Candidate	Votes	%	±%
Conservative	Malcolm Dearden (E)	1147		
Conservative	Alan Ewart-James (E)	1120		
Conservative	Michael Lyons (E)	1080		
Liberal Democrats	Neil Arthur Matthews *	565		
Liberal Democrats	Samuel George Matthews	512		
Liberal Democrats	June Margaret Nolan *	473		
Independent	Martin Keith Ross	419		
Independent	Franca Ross	419		
Independent	Adrian Joseph Gilbert Metherell	389		
Majority		515		
Turnout		2163	47.37	
Conservative gain from Liberal Democrats		Swing		
Conservative gain from Liberal Democrats		Swing		
Conservative gain from Liberal Democrats		Swing		

Wendy Harris had been elected as a Liberal Democrat but defected to the Green Party in 2004. She did not seek re-election.

=== Romney Marsh Division ===
Dymchurch & St Mary's Bay (3 members) 3 May 2007 Romney Marsh Division
Party	Candidate	Votes	%	±%
Conservative	Alan Clifton-Holt (E)	985		
Conservative	Russel Tilson (E)	846		
Conservative	Olwyn Williams (E)	799		
Shepway Independents	Tom Gibbs	562		
Liberal Democrats	Julie White *	474		
Shepway Independents	Ian Barry Meyers	456		
Shepway Independents	Michael Hewton	439		
Liberal Democrats	Brian Wright	431		
People First Party	Shirley Maile *	290		
People First Party	Nicholas Day	196		
Majority		239		
Turnout		2042	39.89	
Conservative gain from Liberal Democrats		Swing		
Conservative gain from Liberal Democrats		Swing		
Conservative gain from Liberal Democrats		Swing		

Terry Preston and Shirley Maile had defected from Lib Dem to People First in 2004.
