= 17th National Assembly =

17th National Assembly may refer to:

- 17th National Assembly of France
- 17th National Assembly of South Korea
