= Kang Gi-gap =

Farmer, journalist and politician in South Korea

Leader of the Unified Progressive Party
- In office May 2012 (Note: Emergency Response Committee chair, full leader from July 2012.) – 10 September 2012
- Preceded by: Lee Jung-hee; Rhyu Si-min; Sim Sang-jung
- Succeeded by: Min Byung-ryul (acting); Kang Byeong-gi

Leader of the Democratic Labor Party
- In office 25 July 2008 – 30 July 2010
- Preceded by: Cheon Young-se
- Succeeded by: Lee Jung-hee

Member of the National Assembly
- In office 30 May 2004 – 30 May 2011
- Constituency: Proportional representation Gyeongnam Sacheon

Personal details
- Born: June 7, 1953 (age 73)
- Party: Korea's Farmer and Fisherman's Party (2023-present)
- Other political affiliations: Democratic Labor Party (2000-2011); Unified Progressive Party (2011-2012); Independent (2012-2023) (Note: Although he worked as an adviser to the Justice Party, he stated that he had not joined the party and was therefore not a party member.)
- Spouse: Park Young-ok (1992-)
- Children: 3 sons 1 daughter

Kang Gi-gap (Korean: 강기갑, born June 7, 1953) is a South Korean farmer who has also worked as a journalist and politician, having started his career as a farmer's rights activist. He served as a National Assembly member for the Democratic Labor Party during the 17th and 18th sessions and was a prominent progressive politician within the Democratic Labor Party and the Unified Progressive Party. He was well-known for his distinctive appearance, characterised by traditional Korean attire, specifically hanbok and durumagi, rubber shoes and a beard.

He served as vice-chairman of the National Farmers' Association and participated in the movement opposing the Korea-US FTA. In 1991, while attending a rally in Seoul against the Uruguay Round, he became aware of the issue regarding unmarried rural men and garnered public attention by spearheading an initiative to help them find spouses. He also worked as a regional bureau chief for The Hankyoreh newspaper and served as a director and auditor for the Sacheon-eup Agricultural Cooperative Federation. After entering politics, he made headlines in December 2008 when a photograph of him protesting inside the office of the National Assembly deputy speaker against the "railroading" of an FTA-related bill went viral. After retiring from politics, he returned to farming. His Catholic baptismal name is Roberto.

== Career ==
=== Early years ===
Kang Gi-gap was born on June 7, 1953, in Sacheon, South Gyeongsang Province, as the third son of Kang Jin-gyu. He has two older brothers and a younger brother. He also has four sisters. At the age of 39, he married Park Young-ok, and they have three sons and one daughter.

Although he was once threatened with suspension from school, he managed to avoid it by displaying his eloquence and quick wit. After graduating from Sadong Elementary School, he went on to Sacheon Middle School, where he was reportedly a relatively quiet student. He graduated from Sacheon Middle School in 1968 and subsequently entered and graduated from Sacheon Agricultural High School.

=== Activities of Farmers' Organisations ===
==== Early stages of activities by agricultural and farmers' organisations ====
After graduating from Sacheon Agricultural High School in 1971, he engaged in farming, including dairy and fruit cultivation. Shortly after he began farming, he injured his back and took a break for about two years; during this time, his family arranged other employment for him as farming was not proving profitable. However, he resisted the temptation to pursue other work and returned to agriculture. At one point in 1988 he joined The Hankyoreh newspaper as a reporter and served as the head of its Sacheon-gun bureau.

In 1976 he joined the Catholic Farmers' Association and began balancing farming with participation in the farmers' movement. Following the rise of the Chun Doo-hwan regime in 1980, the crackdown on the farmers' movement intensified, and he faced persecution by the government. Many activists abandoned the movement during this period. Overcome by disappointment and frustration regarding the farmers, the rural communities, and his departing colleagues—and feeling that he could not continue the movement while harbouring such resentment toward the farmers—Kang entered a monastery and became a lay brother. However, in 1987, having resolved his lingering bitterness regarding rural life, he returned to the countryside.

He served as the head of the Sacheon Gyeongnam province of the Catholic Farmers' Association in 1988, and the head of the Gyeongsangnam federation of the same association from 1987 to 1991. From 1989 to 1991, he chaired the National Committee on Marriage Measures for Rural Bachelors. He participated in the formation of the Sacheon Farmers' Association in 1990 and became the head of the Sacheon City Farmers' Association in 1996. He also served as the vice-chairman of the Korean Peasants League.

==== Activities of the National Farmers' Association and the National Agricultural Cooperative Federation (NACF) ====
When the decision to open the market to imports was made during the 1991 Uruguay Round, many farmers travelled to Seoul to stage protests; Kang Gi-gap was among them, leading demonstrations before being detained by police. While in the detention centre, he had a realisation. Exchanging greetings with fellow activists from various regions, he discovered a large number of unmarried male farmers in their mid-thirties or older. He immediately organised the "Committee for Addressing Marriage Issues for Rural Bachelors" and assumed the role of its chairman. Many rural bachelors and farmers sought out the committee, and the initiative garnered significant attention by successfully facilitating marriages for approximately 130 couples.

He became a delegate to the Korean Peasants League (KPL) in 1998 and served as the vice-chair of the KPL’s South Gyeongsang Province branch from 1998 to 1999; in 1999, he was elected vice-chair of the KPL’s national headquarters. In 2000, he was elected chair of the KPL's South Gyeongsang Province branch and appointed chair of the KPL headquarters' Committee on Cooperative Reform. He became a board member of the Sacheon Agricultural Cooperative in 2001, and subsequently served as its auditor, a position he resigned from in 2003. In 2004, he became vice-chair of the KPL and was also appointed auditor of the Catholic Farmers' Association.

In 2004, following a struggle to block the ratification of the FTA, he joined the Democratic Labor Party and entered politics.

=== Political activities ===
==== Early days of entering politics ====
He entered politics after a career as a farmers' rights activist and secured a seat in the 17th National Assembly as a proportional representation lawmaker representing farmers for the Democratic Labor Party; he particularly drew attention for his distinctive appearance, featuring a beard and traditional attire. In July 2004, he became a member of the National Assembly's Agriculture, Maritime and Fisheries Committee and was simultaneously elected to the Special Committee on Ethics.

In the April 2008 election for the 18th National Assembly, he ran in Sacheon, Gyeongnam, against Lee Bang-ho—the Grand National Party’s Secretary-General and a close aide to President Lee Myung-bak. Although opinion polls and TV exit polls on election day predicted a defeat by a wide margin, he won the race by a margin of 178 votes.

There are several reasons behind Kang Gi-gap’s victory in Sacheon, a traditional stronghold of the Grand National Party. First, the city of Sacheon was formed in 1995 through the merger of Samcheonpo City and Sacheon County; Lee Bang-ho hailed from the former Samcheonpo City, whereas Kang Gi-gap came from the former Sacheon County. Furthermore, because no National Assembly member had previously emerged from the former Sacheon County area, a phenomenon of concentrated voting for Kang Gi-gap occurred within that region.

In addition, rural residents held a favourable view of the candidate, who came from a farming background. Due to this combination of factors, Kang Gi-gap won by a narrow margin. In May 2008, he was elected floor leader of the Democratic Labor Party.

==== Controversy over U.S. beef and participation in candlelight vigils ====
Kang at a Protest against US Beef Agreement

In 2008, the Lee Myung-bak administration and the Grand National Party unilaterally pushed ahead with the renegotiation of the Free Trade Agreement (FTA). During an interview with producer Kim Young-sun, Kang Gi-gap stated that the parliamentary investigation into the beef issue had effectively concluded after the ruling party excluded the production team of the program PD Note from the list of witnesses for the beef hearings. He also criticized the government for delaying the hearings, citing issues regarding witnesses and the Ministry of Foreign Affairs and Trade's intentional failure to submit relevant documents.

Citing a December 2007 report reviewing measures regarding U.S beef, Grand National Party lawmaker Kim Gi-hyeon argued that the Roh Moo-hyun administration had acknowledged the inevitability of a political settlement in the beef negotiations with the U.S. prior to the presidential election and had prepared a roadmap that included accepting OIE standards.

Lawmaker Kang Gi-gap frequently appeared at the candlelight vigils held in connection with the controversy over U.S. beef imports that began in April 2008, He also participated in a 100-minute debate that addressed the topic.

In July 2008, he served as a member of the Special Committee on Parliamentary Investigation. That same month, he was elected to the Supreme Council of the Democratic Labor Party and subsequently became its party leader. Additionally, he concurrently served as a member of the National Assembly's Special Committee on Budget and Accounts and the Land, Transport and Maritime Affairs Committee.

==== Movement against the KORUS FTA ====
Upon entering the National Assembly, he served as a member of the Land, Transport and Maritime Affairs Committee and the Special Committee on Budget and Accounts, and participated in the movement opposing the KORUS FTA.

On 28 May 2008, he was elected as the floor leader of the Democratic Labor Party for the 18th National Assembly. In June, they participated in an agreement among the three opposition parties to refuse to attend parliamentary sessions, including the opening of the 18th National Assembly, until a renegotiation of the KORUS FTA was declared. He ran in the Democratic Labor Party leadership election in July, defeated former Korean Confederation of Trade Unions Chairman Lee Soo-ho, and served as the party leader.

In December 2008, he made headlines after a photograph captured him leaping through the air toward the podium; he had rushed in to protest the Grand National Party's unilateral attempt to railroad an FTA bill through the National Assembly, confronting the Secretary-General and other lawmakers over the move to force the legislation through without consensus.

==== Parliamentary pension issue ====
In August 2010, an amendment to the Act on the Promotion of the Republic of Korea Constitutional Association, which provided a pension of 1.2 million won former members of the National Assembly who had served at least one term and had reached the age 65, Kang Gi-gap voted in favour of this motion, which caused criticism.

=== Activities of the Unified Progressive Party ===
In December 2011, following the merger of the Democratic Labor Party, People's Participation Party and factions of the New Progressive Party to form the Unified Progressive Party, he participated in the new party's founding and served as its floor leader before stepping down. Later, as factional infighting erupted between the "old guard" and the "new guard" within the party, he assumed the role of chairman of the emergency steering committee as a representative of a third faction, striving to resolve and mediate the internal conflicts and disputes.

In the 19th National Assembly election held on 11 April 2012, he ran for the newly established constituency of Sacheon-si, Namhae-gun, and Hadong-gun—formed by merging the former Sacheon-si constituency with the Namhae-gun and Hadong-gun constituency—in a bid for a third term; however, he finished third, losing to the incumbent lawmaker for Namhae-gun and Hadong-gun, Yeo Sang-kyu of the Saenuri Party, and his own predecessor, the former lawmaker for Sacheon-si, independent candidate Lee Bang-ho. While he placed second in Sacheon-si (behind Lee Bang-ho) and outperformed Lee Bang-ho in Namhae-gun and Hadong-gun, it was Yeo Sang-kyu who ultimately took first place.

In May 2012, following the election, he became the chairman of the Unified Progressive Party's emergency response committee and was subsequently elected party leader in July. Although he attempted to resolve internal infighting and external backlash, he failed to bridge the deep rifts between party factions—conflicts stemming controversies surrounding proportional representation lawmakers. Despite resorting to a hunger strike in an effort to resolve the situation, he was unsuccessful and ultimately stepped down from his party post and left the party in September 2012. He has since returned to his original profession and currently runs a plum farm in his hometown of Sacheon, South Gyeongsang Province.

=== Return of the Farmer ===
Since then, he has been working as a farmer as an independent, but he maintains an affection for the Justice Party and occasionally assists the party—such as by serving as the chairman of its election campaign committee—despite his independent status.

== History ==
- Graduated from Sacheon Agricultural High School (1971)
- President, Gyeongsangnam Federation of the Catholic Farmers' Association (1987–1991)
- Head of Sacheon Branch, Hankyoreh Newspaper (1988) President, Sacheon Council of the Catholic Farmers' Association (1988)
- Chairperson, National Committee for Addressing Marriage Issues for Rural Bachelors (1989–1991)
- Founding Member, Sacheon Farmers' Association (1990)
- President, Sacheon City Farmers' Association; Vice President, Korean Peasants League (1998-1999)
- Vice Chairperson, Korean Peasants League; Chairperson, Committee on Farm Household Debt (1999–2000)
- Chairperson, Gyeongsangnam Federation of the Korean Peasants League; Chairperson, Committee on Cooperative Reform (2000–2003)
- Board Member, Sacheon Agricultural Cooperative (2001)
- Auditor, Sacheon Agricultural Cooperative (2001–2003)
- Vice Chairperson, Korean Peasants League; Auditor, Catholic Farmers' Association (2004)
- Proportional Representation Member of the National Assembly, Democratic Labor Party (2004–2008)
- Selected as an Outstanding Lawmaker for National Assembly Audits by the Citizens' Coalition for Economic Justice (CCEJ) for four consecutive years (2007–2010)
- President, Korea-Costa Rica Parliamentary Friendship
- Association Floor Leader, Democratic Labor Party Party Leader, Democratic Labor Party (2008–July 2010)
- Member of the National Assembly (Sacheon City Constituency), Democratic Labor Party (2008–2012)
- Floor Leader, Unified Progressive Party (December 2011–May 2012)

== Activities as a Member of the National Assembly ==
=== 17th National Assembly ===
During the four-year term of the 17th National Assembly (2004–2008), a total of 45 legislative bills were proposed. Of these, zero bills were proposed individually.

- Hunger strike against the KORUS FTA
- Actively advocating for support for farmers who have lost their economic viability
- Other Democratic Labor Party activities, such as campaigning against discrimination against irregular workers and opposing the Iraq War

=== 18th National Assembly ===
During the four-year term of the 18th National Assembly (2008–2012), a total of 23 legislative bills were proposed. Of these, zero bills were proposed individually.

- Campaigning against the Lee Myung-bak administration's negotiations to resume U.S. beef imports. He also actively participated in protests opposing the South Korea-U.S. beef agreement.
- Party Leader and Floor Leader of the Democratic Labor Party
- Opposing the nomination of a figure from the "Hanahoe" new military faction as National Assembly Speaker.

== Awards and Career History ==
- 2007 Outstanding National Assembly Member (National Audit) – CCEJ
- 2008 "Gentleman Lawmaker" Award – 10th Baekbong Gentleman Award
- 2008 Outstanding National Assembly Member (National Audit) – CCEJ
- 2009 Outstanding National Assembly Member (National Audit) – CCEJ
- 2010 Outstanding National Assembly Member (National Audit) – CCEJ
- 2011 Excellence Award – Outstanding National Assembly Research Group Awards

== Anecdote ==
=== Fashion ===
His white durumagi and long beard became his trademarks, serving as iconic features of his image. Some even nicknamed him "Gangdalf"—a play on words combining his surname, Kang, with Gandalf from The Lord of the Rings. Additionally, from 2009 to 2010, KBS featured a character parodying him in a sketch titled the "Committee for Guaranteeing Men's Rights", which satirised social sentiments regarding reverse discrimination between the sexes.

=== Allegations regarding early voting and the court's ruling ===
On March 8, 2008, before the 18th general election, Rep. Kang Gi-gap held a 'Party Members' Commitment Rally' at the Sacheon Indoor Stadium hosted by the Gyeongnam Provincial Party of the Democratic Labor Party, attended by non-party members, and was indicted by the prosecution on charges of pre-election campaigning for this reason. Although the prosecution had sought a fine of 3 million won, the court ultimately imposed a fine of 800,000 won in the first trial, allowing the lawmaker to retain their seat. Following the ruling, the Democratic Labor Party declared that "the Lee Myung-bak administration's scenario for Lee Bang-ho's political comeback has been thwarted." However, the prosecution appealed the ruling declaring that the sentence was excessively lenient and therefore unacceptable. In addition, an appeal was filed against the ruling imposing a fine of 2.5 million won on Jo Su-hyeon, the manager of Kang Gi-gap’s election campaign office during the general election.

=== Controversy over sit-ins, injuries, and violence within the National Assembly ===
Representative Kang Gi-gap joined the sit-in staged by Democratic Party lawmakers in the main assembly hall starting on 26 December 2008. On 5 January 2009, the Democratic Party called off its sit-in in the Rotunda Hall—located just outside the main assembly hall—leaving only officials from the Democratic Labor Party behind; the National Assembly Secretariat then mobilised security officers to forcibly clear the remaining protesters, a process that resulted in injuries and the detention of party officials. During a scuffle in front of the Speaker’s office, Kang suffered a severe finger fracture; he subsequently visited the office of the National Assembly Secretary-General to lodge a protest, but upon finding the official absent, he caused a disturbance by smashing furnishings and kicking over a desk. Amidst this, a photograph capturing Kang Gi-gap jumping onto a desk made it appear as though he were levitating, earning him the nickname "Levitating Kang Gi-gap." In response, Park Gye-dong, Secretary-General of the National Assembly, stated his intention to file charges for offences such as obstruction of the performance of official duties, insult, and violence; meanwhile, Ahn Kyung-ryul, Secretary-General of the Grand National Party, labeled Representative Kang Gi-gap the "ringleader of the violence" and declared that the party would seek his expulsion from the National Assembly. Furthermore, the Grand National Party filed a complaint with the prosecution regarding this incident.

On 6 January 2009, Kang Gi-gap met with the Secretary-General of the National Assembly to express his regret, stating, "It is true that I engaged in excessive behaviour that went beyond what is appropriate for a party leader." Meanwhile, the Democratic Labor Party criticised the situation, arguing that Representative Kang Gi-gap is ultimately the victim; they questioned whether there were political motives behind the National Assembly Secretariat and the Grand National Party singling out Representative Kang for attack while remaining silent on the violent acts committed by the Democratic Party. Additionally, Representative Kang was indicted on charges of obstructing official duties—including interference with the execution of public duties—after staging a violent protest in the Office of the National Assembly Secretary-General. This incident occurred in January 2009 while he was protesting the forced passage of the "Media Bills" within the National Assembly; when the Speaker mobilised security personnel to forcibly disperse officials from the Democratic Labor Party, he protested vehemently by creating a scene—which included physically grappling with a security guard and engaging in chaotic behaviour—and was subsequently sentenced to a fine of 3 million won on appeal.

== Electoral history ==
Year	Election	Assembly	Office	Constituency	Party	Votes	Vote share	Rank	Result	Notes
2004	General election	17th National Assembly	Member of the National Assembly	Proportional representation	Democratic Labor Party	2,774,061	13.03%	6th (proportional representation)	Elected	First election
2008	General election	18th National Assembly	Member of the National Assembly	Sacheon, South Gyeongsang	Democratic Labor Party	23,864	47.69%	1st	Won	Re-election
2012	General election	19th National Assembly	Member of the National Assembly	Sacheon–Namhae–Hadong, South Gyeongsang	Unified Progressive Party	27,653	24.05%	3rd	Defeated	

== See also ==
- Democratic Labor Party (South Korea)
- Unified Progressive Party
- People's Participation Party
- Justice Party (South Korea)
- Korea's Farmer and Fisherman's Party
