= Ryu Keun-chan =

South Korean journalist and politician (1949–2025)

- 류근찬

Member of the National Assembly
- In office May 30, 2004 – May 29, 2012
- Preceded by: Kim Yong-hwan
- Succeeded by: Kim Tae-heum
- Constituency: Boryeong–Seocheon

Personal details
- Born: February 27, 1949 Jupo-myeon, Boryeong, South Chungcheong Province, South Korea
- Died: February 26, 2025 (aged 75)
- Citizenship: South Korea
- Party: Liberty Forward Party
- Other political affiliations: United Liberal Democrats; People First Party
- Profession: Journalist, politician

Korean name
- Hangul: 류근찬
- Hanja: 柳根粲
- RR: Ryu Geunchan
- MR: Ryu Kŭnch'an

Ryu Keun-chan (Korean: 류근찬; February 27, 1949 – February 26, 2025) was a South Korean journalist and politician. He was the anchor for KBS News 9 from 1992 to 1993 and 1995 to 1998. After leaving journalism in 2003, he entered politics and served as a member of the National Assembly for Boryeong–Seocheon.

== Biography ==
Ryu Keun-chan was born on February 27, 1949, in Jupo-myeon, Boryeong, South Korea. He was a member of the Jinju Ryu clan. Ryu was a graduate of Sungdong High School and Seoul National University.

In 1974, Ryu joined KBS as a journalist. He served as its Washington correspondent before returning to South Korea in 1992. From October 1992 to April 1993 and from May 1995 to May 1998, he served as the news anchor for KBS' flagship news broadcast, KBS News 9. In 2003, he left journalism for politics, and the following year, he was elected as the United Liberal Democrat member of the National Assembly for Boryeong–Seocheon. On April 14, 2005, he left the United Liberal Democrats, becoming an independent. In January 2006, Ryu became a founding member of the People First Party. In 2008, he participated in the founding of the Liberty Forward Party and was re-elected in the election later that year. He ran for re-election for a third time in 2012, but lost to the Saenuri Party candidate, Kim Tae-heum.

On February 26, 2025, Ryu Keun-chan died.

== Election results ==
Year	Elections	Constituency	Political party	Votes (%)	Results
2004	17th National Assembly General Election	Boryeong–Seocheon (South Chungcheong)	ULD	30,569 (39.35%)	Won
2008	18th National Assembly General Election	Boryeong–Seocheon (South Chungcheong)	LFP	35,952 (52.14%)	Won
2012	19th National Assembly General Election	Boryeong–Seocheon (South Chungcheong)	LFP	20,983 (27.67%)	Defeated
