= Cheon Young-se =

South Korean politician and labor activist (born 1943)

- 천영세
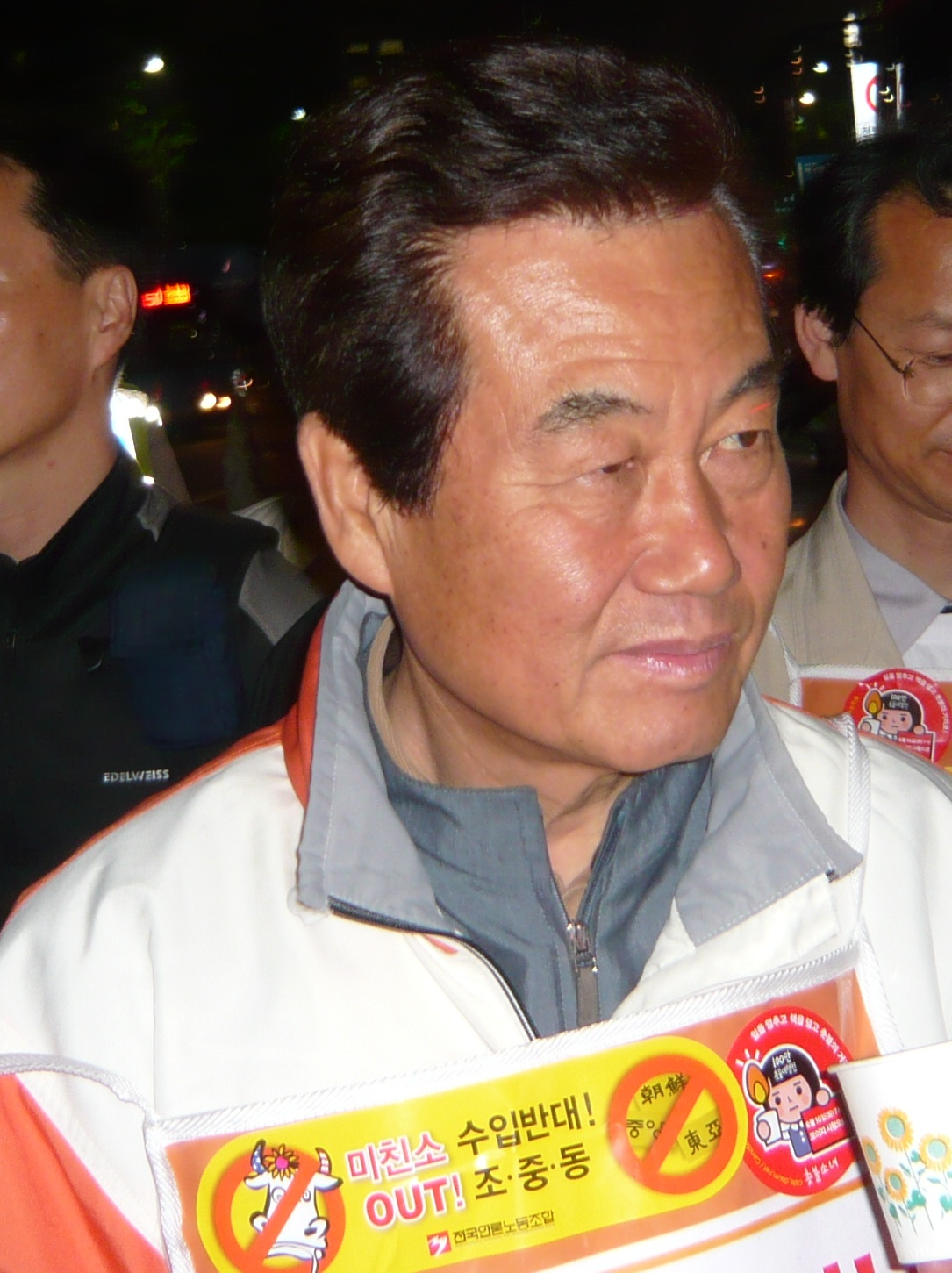

Leader of the Democratic Labor Party
- In office 4 February 2008 – 25 July 2008
- Preceded by: Sim Sang-jung
- Succeeded by: Kang Gi-gap

Member of the National Assembly
- In office 30 May 2004 – 29 May 2008
- Constituency: Proportional representation

Personal details
- Born: August 20, 1943 (age 83)
- Party: Independent (1996–1997, 1999–2000, 2012–)
- Other political affiliations: Unified Progressive Party (2011–2012); Democratic Labor Party (2000–2011); Construction National Victory 21 (1997–1999)

Cheon Young-se (Korean: 천영세, 20 August 1943) is a South Korean labor activist and politician. He served as a member of the 17th National Assembly.

== Career ==
Between 1971 and 1973, Cheon worked as a researcher at the Korea University Institute of Labor Studies. In 1973, he became director of planning at the Chemical Workers' Union of the Federation of Korean Trade Unions. In 1974, he was appointed to the policy committee of the Federation of Korean Trade Unions. From 1975 to 1979, he served on the Christian Academy Education Committee. In 1986, he was appointed Secretary-General of the Korean Association for Labor Education, a position he held until 1989. In 1990, he became a member of the standing steering committee of the National Council of Trade Unions. In 1992, he became co-chairperson of the National Alliance for Democracy and National Unification. In 1997, he served as campaign manager of Kwon Young-ghil, the presidential candidate of Construction National Victory 21. From 2000 to 2002, he served as Secretary General of the Democratic Labor Party. In 2002, he became deputy leader of the Democratic Labor Party. In the 2004 South Korean legislative election, he was elected to the National Assembly. In 2008, he became leader of the Democratic Labor Party, succeeding Sim Sang-jung and was succeeded by Kang Gi-gap.

== Electoral history ==
Year	Election	Number of seats	Position	Constituency	Party	Votes	Vote share	Ranking	Elected	Notes
2004	2004 South Korean legislative election	17th National Assembly	Member of the National Assembly	Proportional representation	Democratic Labor Party	2,774,061	13.03%	4th (proportional representation)	Yes	2004 election

== See also ==
- List of members of the National Assembly (South Korea), 2004–2008
- Construction National Victory 21
- Democratic Labor Party (South Korea)
- Sim Sang-jung
- Kang Gi-gap
