= Lee Wan-koo =

South Korean politician (1950–2021)

His Excellency Lee Wan-koo
- 이완구
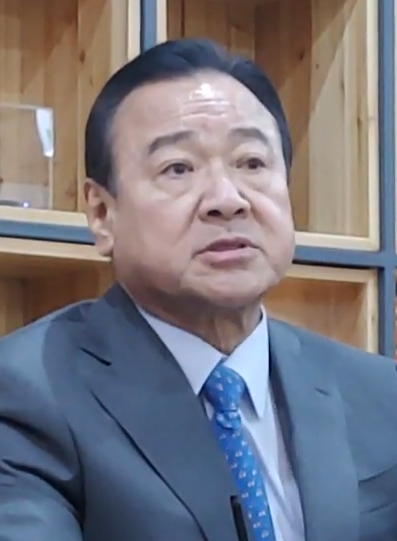

43rd Prime Minister of South Korea
- In office 16 February 2015 – 27 April 2015
- President: Park Geun Hye
- Preceded by: Jung Hong-won
- Succeeded by: Choi Kyoung-hwan (acting); Hwang Kyo-ahn

Member of the National Assembly
- In office 25 April 2013 – 29 May 2016
- Preceded by: Kim Geun-tae
- Succeeded by: Chung Jin-suk (Gongju–Buyeo–Cheongyang, South Chungcheong)
- Constituency: Buyeo–Cheongyang (South Chungcheong)
- In office 30 May 1996 – 29 May 2004
- Preceded by: Cho Bu-young
- Succeeded by: Kim Hak-won (Buyeo–Cheongyang, South Chungcheong); Hong Mun-pyo (Hongseong–Yesan, South Chungcheong)
- Constituency: Cheongyang–Hongseong (South Chungcheong)

Chairman of the Saenuri Party
- Interim
- In office 15 May 2014 – 13 July 2014
- Preceded by: Hwang Woo-yea
- Succeeded by: Kim Moo-sung

Governor of South Chungcheong Province
- In office 1 July 2006 – 4 December 2009
- Preceded by: Sim Dae-pyung; Yoo Deok-joon (acting)
- Succeeded by: Lee In-hwa (acting); Ahn Hee-jung

Personal details
- Born: 16 July 1950 Cheongyang County, South Chungcheong Province, South Korea
- Died: 14 October 2021 (aged 71) Seoul, South Korea
- Party: People Power
- Education: Sungkyunkwan University (BA); Michigan State University (MA); Dankook University (PhD)

Korean name
- Hangul: 이완구
- Hanja: 李完九
- RR: I Wangu
- MR: I Wan'gu

Lee Wan-koo (Korean: 이완구; Hanja: 李完九; 16 July 1950 – 14 October 2021) was a South Korean politician who served as the Prime minister of South Korea from February to April 2015.

== Biography ==
Lee was born in 1950 in Bibong-myeon, Cheongyang, South Chungcheong Province. After graduating from Sungkyunkwan University, Lee worked as a public officer in the Economic Planning Board (current Ministry of Strategy and Finance) and later moved to the National Police Agency. From 1982 to 1984, he studied at Michigan State University in the United States and received an M. A. in Criminal Justice. From 1986 to 1989, Lee served as Consul for the Consulate General of the Republic of Korea in Los Angeles.

In 1995, Lee entered into politics, joining the Democratic Liberal Party (later renamed as the New Korea Party). In the 1996 election, he was elected as a member of the National Assembly for the New Korea Party. In 1998, he joined the United Liberal Democrats, led by Kim Jong-pil. In the 2006 election, he was elected as the governor of South Chungcheong Province. He resigned as governor on 23 December 2009, as a protest against the Lee Myung-bak government.

Lee was diagnosed with multiple myeloma, a type of blood cancer. After recovering, he was re-elected as a member of the National Assembly in a 2013 by-election. In May 2014, he became the floor leader of the ruling Saenuri Party.

=== Prime Minister of South Korea ===
On 23 January 2015, President Park Geun-hye named Lee, at the time parliamentary floor leader, as prime minister. Lee was confirmed by the National Assembly as Prime Minister on 16 February 2015; the National Assembly voted with 148 Yes, 128 No, with 5 Abstained.

On 20 April 2015, Lee offered to resign as Prime Minister, amid allegations of bribery. He formally stepped down on 27 April 2015, apologizing over a scandal in which he was accused of taking an illegal cash gift from Sung Wan-jong, a businessman. President Park Geun-hye accepted Lee's resignation.

=== Conviction ===
In January 2016, he was convicted of taking illegal funds by the Seoul Central District Court. However, in September 2016, he was acquitted by the Seoul High Court. On 2017, the Supreme Court upheld the Seoul High Court's acquittal of Lee.

== Death ==
In 2016, Lee's cancer returned. He died on 14 October 2021, due to multiple myeloma, at the age of 71. He died about two weeks before former President Roh Tae Woo died on October 26, 2021.

== Election results ==
=== General elections ===
Year	Elections	Constituency	Political party	Votes (%)	Results
1996	15th National Assembly General Election	Cheongyang–Hongseong (South Chungcheong)	NKP	35,638 (47.45%)	Won
2000	16th National Assembly General Election	Cheongyang–Hongseong (South Chungcheong)	ULD	46,633 (69.35%)	Won
2013	2013 By-election	Buyeo–Cheongyang (South Chungcheong)	Saenuri	30,342 (77.40%)	Won

=== Local elections ===
==== Governor of South Chungcheong ====
Year	Elections	Constituency	Political party	Votes (%)	Remarks
2006	4th Iocal Election	South Chungcheong (Governoral Elections)	GNP	379,420 (46.31%)	Won

Political offices
Preceded by Jung Hong-won	Prime Minister of South Korea; 2015	Succeeded by Choi Kyoung-hwan acting Hwang Kyo-ahn
