= Democratic Party (South Korea, 2007) =

2007–2008 political party in South Korea

Democratic Party 민주당
- Founded: 27 June 2007
- Dissolved: 17 February 2008
- Merger of: Democratic Party (2005); New Party for Centrist Reform and Alliance
- Merged into: United Democratic Party
- Ideology: Liberalism (South Korean); Centrist reformism
- Colours: Blue green

- Democratic Party
- Hangul: 민주당
- Hanja: 民主黨
- RR: Minjudang
- MR: Minjudang

Centrist United Democratic Party
- Hangul: 중도통합민주당
- RR: Jungdo tonghap minjudang
- MR: Chungdo t'onghap minjudang

The Democratic Party (DP; Korean: 민주당) was a political party in South Korea. Formerly founded as the Centrist United Democratic Party (CUDP; 중도통합민주당) after the merger of the Democratic Party (2005), it merged with the Grand Unified Democratic New Party in February 2008.

== History ==
On 27 June 2007, the Democratic Party (2005) and New Party for Centrist Reform and Alliance merged and formed the Centrist United Democratic Party.

On August 13, 2007, the party changed its name to the Democratic Party.

Lee In-je was elected the party's presidential candidate on 14 October 2007. In the election on December 19, he obtained 0.7% of the vote, finishing sixth.

Logo of the New Party for Centrist Reform and Alliance (2007)

Logo of the Centrist United Democratic Party (2007)

On 18 February 2008, the party merged with the Grand Unified Democratic New Party to form the United Democratic Party.

== Election results ==
Election	Candidate	Votes	%	Outcome
2007	Lee In-je	160,708	0.68	Not elected

== See also ==
- List of political parties in South Korea
- Politics of South Korea
- Elections in South Korea
- Liberalism in South Korea
- Liberalism
- Contributions to liberal theory
- Liberalism worldwide
- List of liberal parties
- Liberal democracy
