= Yang Seung-jo =

South Korean politician

- 양승조
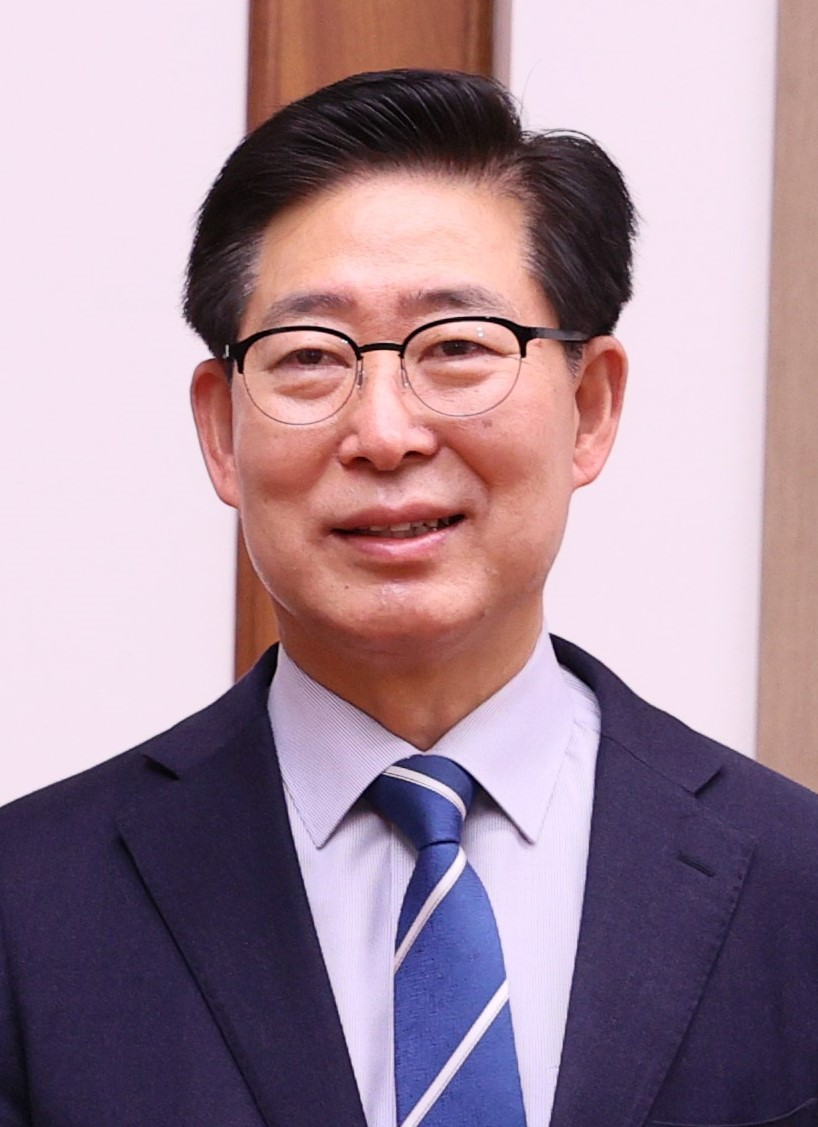

Governor of South Chungcheong Province
- In office 1 July 2018 – 30 June 2022
- Preceded by: Ahn Hee-jung; Namkoong Young (acting)
- Succeeded by: Kim Tae-heum

Member of the National Assembly
- In office 30 May 2004 – 14 May 2018
- Preceded by: Jeon Yong-hak
- Succeeded by: Yun Il-gyu
- Constituency: South Chungcheong Cheonan A (2004–2016); South Chungcheong Cheonan C (2016–2018)

Chairman of Korea Water Resources Corporation
- Incumbent
- Assumed office 13 November 2026
- President: Lee Jae Myung
- Prime Minister: Han Seong-sook
- Preceded by: Yun Seog-dae

Personal details
- Born: 21 March 1959 (age 67) Cheonan, South Korea
- Party: Democratic
- Education: Sungkyunkwan University; Dankook University
- Website: withyang.co.kr

Korean name
- Hangul: 양승조
- Hanja: 梁承晁
- RR: Yang Seungjo
- MR: Yang Sŭngjo

Yang Seung-jo (Korean: 양승조; born 21 March 1959) is a South Korean lawyer and politician who served as the Governor of South Chungcheong Province from 2018 to 2022.

== Early life ==
Yang Seung-jo was born in Cheonan, South Chungcheong Province to a Confucian scholar, Yang Tae-seok and his mother, Lee Jong-ki.

He passed the 37th judicial examination in 1995, completed 27 training courses and worked as a lawyer.

== Political career ==
In 2004, Yang Seung-jo ran for a Member of the National Assembly in Cheonan and he won the election. He served as the chief of staff for Chairman of the Democratic Party Sohn Hak-kyu and served as the head of the election campaign committee for Sohn Hak-kyu during the 2012 Democratic Party presidential primary. And he became a member of the Supreme council of the Democratic Party in May 2013.

Yang was elected governor of South Chungcheong Province in the 2018 local elections.

== Election results ==
=== General elections ===
Year	Elections	Constituency	Political party	Votes (%)	Results
2004	17th National Assembly General Election	Cheonan A (South Chungcheong)	Uri	38,675 (45.33%)	Won
2008	18th National Assembly General Election	Cheonan A (South Chungcheong)	UDP	28,774 (38.26%)	Won
2012	19th National Assembly General Election	Cheonan A (South Chungcheong)	DUP	57,810 (51.83%)	Won
2016	20th National Assembly General Election	Cheonan C (South Chungcheong)	Democratic	38,358 (49.67%)	Won
2024	22nd National Assembly General Election	Hoengseong–Yesan (South Chungcheong)	Democratic	46,972 (45.15%)	Defeated (2nd)

=== Local elections ===
==== Governor of South Chungcheong ====
Year	Elections	Constituency	Political party	Votes (%)	Remarks
2018	7th Iocal Election	South Chungcheong (Governoral Elections)	Democratic	615,870 (62.55%)	Won
2022	8th Iocal Election	South Chungcheong (Governoral Elections)	Democratic	401,308 (46.12%)	Defeated (2nd)
