= Ahn Hee-jung =

South Korean politician

- 안희정
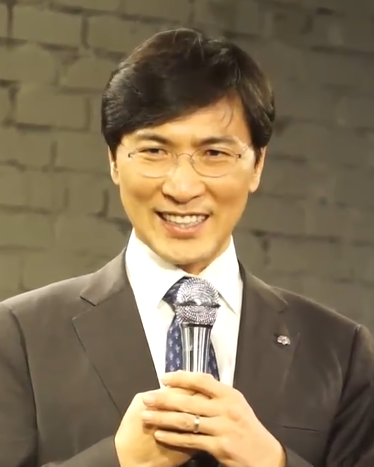

Governor of South Chungcheong Province
- In office 1 July 2010 – 6 March 2018
- Preceded by: Lee Wan-koo; Lee In-hwa (acting)
- Succeeded by: Namkoong Young (acting); Yang Seung-jo

Personal details
- Born: 1 May 1965 (age 61) Nonsan, South Korea
- Party: Independent
- Other political affiliations: Democratic (until 2018)
- Education: Korea University

Korean name
- Hangul: 안희정
- Hanja: 安熙正
- RR: An Huijeong
- MR: An Hŭijŏng

Ahn Hee-jung (born 1 May 1965), also known as An Hee-jung, is a former South Korean politician and convicted felon. He served as the 36th and 37th Governor of South Chungcheong Province. He stepped down from his role as governor and announced his retirement from public life after acknowledging accusations that he sexually assaulted his aide Kim Ji-eun on multiple occasions. In February 2019, he was sentenced to a three-and-a-half-year prison term for sexual assault.

== Early life and education ==
Ahn Hee-jung was born in Yeonmu County, Nonsan, South Chungcheong Province on 1 May 1965, as the third of five children. He dropped out of Namdaejeon High School in Daejeon due to his involvement in the Pyeongcheonha incident, in which he was caught reading Pyeongcheonha, an anti-regime newspaper published by Lee Chan-koo. The underground newspaper, which was on a banned list, was handed over by the owner of Jaeil Bookstore at the corner of Daejeon Downtown District. Even though he was transferred to Seongnam High School in Daebang-dong, Seoul, he decided to quit school.

After participating in demonstrations staged against Kookpoong 81, he decided to go to university, thinking university entrance would give him the leverage to actively participate in pro-democracy student protests. Ahn first passed the qualification exam and then he was admitted to Korea University in 1983. He was active and organized the Korea University Patriotic Students Association, merging fourteen student clubs of Korea University.

In 1998, he was arrested by the Agency for National Security Planning and was imprisoned for 10 months after being convicted of the involvement in the youth-led rallies motivated by anti-American sentiment.

- 1977- Graduated from Gujagok Elementary School in Nonsan
- 1980- Graduated from Yeonmu Middle School in South Chungcheong Province
- 1980- Dropped out of Namdaejon High School in Daejeon (honorary graduation in 2003)
- 1981- Dropped out of Sungnam High School in Seoul
- 1982- Passed Qualifying Test for College Entrance (equivalent to GED in the U.S.)
- 1983- Entered the Department of Philosophy, Korea University
- 1995- Graduated from the Department of Philosophy, Korea University

== Political career ==
=== First roles in politics ===
Starting from January 1989, Ahn Hee-jung worked as an aide to lawmaker Kim Deok-ryong of the Reunification Democratic Party. On 1 January 1990, Kim Young-sam led the three-party-merger supported by seven political leaders: Lee Ki-taek; Kim Jeong-gil; Jang Seok-hwa; Park Chan-jong; Hong Sa-deok; Lee Chul and Roh Moo-hyun. However, Ahn did not join the move as he was against the three-party-merger in principle so instead he led the efforts to establish a new democratic party in 1990. The eighteen members of the Reunification Democratic Party including Ahn Hee-jung chose to remain in the newly established democratic party.

He also worked as secretary to Director-General Lee Chul. As he became disillusioned with the negative sides of politics and decided to quit. To further reflect on his decision, he chose to do daywork at the construction site of the Changwon Labor Welfare Center for two months. After lawmaker Lee Chul won at the general election, he resigned as secretary and quit politics on 4 April 1992.

=== Return to politics ===
After quitting politics, he started a new career as a sales manager of a publishing company. As he was disappointed by lack of conviction amongst the existing politicians, he returned to Korea University to continue his studies to create a new opportunity. Meanwhile, in June 1994, with Lee Kwang-jae, he worked as Director General of the Local Autonomy Affairs Research Institute to support presidential candidate Roh Moo-hyun, who had lost in the 1992 general election. While working as a political aide to the presidential candidate of the New Millennium Democratic Party Roh Moo-hyun, they won the 2002 presidential election, and Ahn Hee-jung was credited for the successful campaign.

- 1990 Party Executive of the Organization Bureau, Central Party of the small Democratic Party
- 1994 Secretary General of the Local Government Practice Research Institute
- 2001 Secretary General of the Election Camp of the presidential candidate Roh Moo-hyun
- 2002 Leader of the Political Affairs Team, Secretary's Office of the Democratic Party presidential candidate Roh Moo-hyun

==== Prison sentence ====
In December 2003, he and Yeom Dong-yeon were indicted for receiving illegal campaign contributions from several businessmen. He was found guilty in an appeal court in September 2004 and was sentenced to one year in prison, serving his term at the Seoul Detention Center. Ahn was concerned that his conviction might do harm to the President and declined any political titles during the participatory government to keep a distance.

==== Return to party ====
While looking for a job after his sentence, Ahn found himself rejected many times. However, with the permission of Chairman Kang Geum-won he took an advisory position at Changshin Textile. In 2007, Kang nominated Ahn as the chairman of the standing committee which organized the Participatory Government Evaluation Forum. The following year, he made a vow to follow the political beliefs of two former Presidents, Kim Dae-jung and Roh Moo-hyun, and was elected as an executive committee member of the United Democratic Party. After being elected, he took a leading role in establishing the Better Democracy Research Institute which inherited the functions of the Local Autonomy Affairs Research Institute.

- 2005 Researcher at Asia Research Institute of Korea University
- 2007 Standing Chairman of the executive committee of the Participant Government Evaluation Forum
- 2007 Democratic Party Chairman of Nonsan, Gyeryong, and Geumsan election districts in South Chungcheong
- 2008 President of the Institute for Better Democracy
- 2009 Supreme Committee member of the Democratic Party

=== Governor of South Chungcheong ===
Ahn won the governorship of South Chungcheong Province against Park Sang-don of the Liberty Forward Party by a margin of 2.4 percent in the fifth local election held on 2 June 2010. As a candidate of the Democratic Party in 2008, he who was known for his inclination toward political reform and consequently won the local election. It was the first time for a liberal party candidate in the conservative voting region. The victory was deemed a proof of his overcoming regional sentiments and made many people consider him as a future presidential hopeful .

Ahn was re-elected to the position of the 37th (6th directly elected) Governor of South Chungcheong in 2014, defeating Chung Jin-suk.

| Election | Province | Party affiliation | Pct | Votes | Result |
|---|---|---|---|---|---|
| 5th Local Election | Chungcheongnam | Minjoo Party | 42.2% | 367,288 | Elected |
| 6th Local Election | Chungcheongnam | New Politics Alliance for Democracy | 52.21% | 465,994 | Elected |

=== 2017 presidential campaign ===
Ahn was considered the main darkhorse contender to be the Democratic Party of Korea's presidential nominee against frontrunner Moon Jae-in. His primary appeal was mainly as a young center-left candidate who was socially and economically liberal but held a centrist stance on issues of national security.

After finishing behind Moon and endorsing his party's candidate, polls showed that most of Ahn's original supporters started supporting People's Party nominee Ahn Cheol-soo (no relation). As runner up to the eventual winner President Moon, Ahn was considered an heir and a leading party candidate for the following presidential election in 2022.

== Sexual assault ==
On 5 March 2018, Ahn's secretary Kim Ji-eun stated during a live interview with the news channel JTBC that she had been sexually assaulted by Ahn and raped four times over eight months. She revealed there were other victims in the Governor's office.

In an emergency session of the Party leadership the very same day, Ahn was expelled from the Democratic Party. Subsequently, Ahn resigned from his position as governor, admitting to the charges and apologizing to the victims of the assault.

On 10 March 2018, Ahn Hee-jung was questioned by prosecutors for allegedly sexually assaulting Kim. He denied the alleged sexual assault and claimed it was consensual.

On 14 August 2018, Seoul Western District Court found Ahn not guilty. The decision sparked controversy, as protesters gathered the following weekend. Critics of the ruling claimed that the court, which cited a lack of evidence, took a "blame the victim" approach. Some also expressed concern that the decision showed a lack of progress of the Me Too movement and women's rights in South Korea.

On 1 February 2019, the Seoul High Court overturned his acquittal by the Seoul Western District Court and jailed Ahn for three and a half years on charges of repeatedly raping his former aide Kim Ji-eun. The presiding judge Hong Dong-ki stated that it seemed "evident that Ahn was aware of the power imbalance between him and Kim" and that "Kim's testimonies were consistent and aligned with those of other witnesses."

== Election results ==
=== Local elections ===
==== Governor of South Chungcheong ====
| Year | Elections | Constituency | Political party | Votes (%) | Remarks |
|---|---|---|---|---|---|
| 2010 | 5th Iocal Election | South Chungcheong (Governoral Elections) | Democratic | 367,288 (42.25%) | Won |
| 2014 | 6th Iocal Election | South Chungcheong (Governoral Elections) | NPAD | 460,691 (52.21%) | Won |
