= People First =

People First may refer to:

- People First Network aka P.F.Net, based in the Solomon Islands
- People First Party (Fiji), a political party in Fiji
- People First Party (Taiwan), a political party in Taiwan
- People First Party (Solomon Islands)
- Gerard Rennick People First, political party in Australia
- People First Party (South Korea)
- Pipol First Party (Papua New Guinea)
- Bayan Muna, which translates to "People first", a political party in the Philippines
- People-first language, a concept similar to political correctness, regarding language use relating to people with disabilities
