= Korea's Farmer and Fisherman's Party =

Political party in South Korea

- Abbreviation: Rural People's Party
- Leader: Kim Do-gun
- Founded: November 7, 2023
- Registered: November 20, 2023
- Headquarters: Room 830, 780 Gukhoe-daero, Yeongdeungpo-gu, Seoul
- Membership: 5204
- Ideology: Agrarianism; Ecology; Promotion of rights and interests of farmers and fishermen
- Political position: Single issue
- Colors: Blue; Yellow; Red
- National Assembly: 0 / 300
- Metropolitan Mayors and Governors: 0 / 16
- Municipal Mayors: 0 / 227
- Provincial and Metropolitan Councillors: 0 / 933
- Municipal Councillors: 0 / 3,034

Website
- 한국농어민당.kr

Korean name
- Hangul: 한국농어민당
- Hanja: 韓國農漁民黨
- RR: Hanguk nongeomindang
- MR: Han'guk nongŏmindang

The Korea's Farmer and Fisherman's Party (Korean: 한국농어민당) is a South Korean political party founded on 7 November 2023. It was founded to promote the interests of farmers and fisherman in Korea, advancing their rights, protecting their interests and developing rural areas. The party was formed primarily through the participation of agricultural and fisheries organisations as well as former Justice Party politicians such as Park Woong-du. Park later left the party to join the Rebuilding Korea Party. It fielded candidates in two constituencies in Jeonbuk and Jeonnam in the 2024 South Korean legislative election. Its candidate Hwang Eui-don campaigned on policies concerning farmers and rural communities, including increasing village allowances and subsidies for agricultural outputs. In the 2025 South Korean presidential election the party endorsed Lee Jae-myung referring to him as "the only candidate to stabilise the lives of farmers and fishermen".

== Election results ==
=== National Assembly elections ===
Year	Election	Constituency representatives		Proportional representation		Total	
		Seats won	Vote share	Seats won	Vote share	Seats won	Vote share
2024	22nd	0/254	0%	0/46	0.04%	0/300	0%
