= Advancement Unification Party =

2008–2012 political party in South Korea

Advancement Unification Party 선진통일당
- President: Lee In-je
- Founded: 4 February 2008
- Dissolved: 16 November 2012
- Split from: Hannara Party
- Merged into: Saenuri Party
- Headquarters: 14-14 Yongsan Building, Yeoeuido-dong Yeongdeungpo District, Seoul
- Ideology: Conservatism (South Korean); Regionalism
- National affiliation: Advancement and Creation Association (2008–2009)
- Colours: Dark Blue

Website
- Website (archived)

- Advancement Unification Party
- Hangul: 선진통일당
- Hanja: 先進統一黨
- RR: Seonjin tongildang
- MR: Sŏnjin t'ongildang

Liberty Forward Party (formerly)
- Hangul: 자유선진당
- Hanja: 自由先進黨
- RR: Jayu seonjindang
- MR: Chayu sŏnjindang

Logo of the Liberty Forward Party

Advancement Unification Party (AUP; Korean: 선진통일당), formerly known as Liberty Forward Party, was a conservative political party in South Korea. This party was created by Lee Hoi Chang, the presidential candidate who lost 2007 presidential elections. On 12 February 2008, People First Party merged into the party.

The party was absorbed by Saenuri Party on 16 November 2012.

== Human rights activism ==
In February–March 2012, just before the scheduled national elections, Liberty Forward Party representative Park Sun-young became active in the "Save My Friend" campaign, a series of protests protesting China's policy of forcibly repatriating North Korean refugees; she went on hunger strike in front of the Chinese embassy in Seoul and was hospitalized after fainting; once she recovered she resumed her efforts to raise awareness about North Korean human rights issues. In April, during a speech at an event hosted by the Korean-American Freedom League, Park criticized the Catholic Association for Peace and Justice, questioning its silence on the plight of North Korean refugees and arguing that the Left's anti-Americanism was distracting from much more serious issues: "Defectors) are ruthlessly being killed, so how can you remain completely silent? In the Republic of Korea, there is a wildfire anti-American movement, but they never make a single critical statement against China."

== 2012 election ==
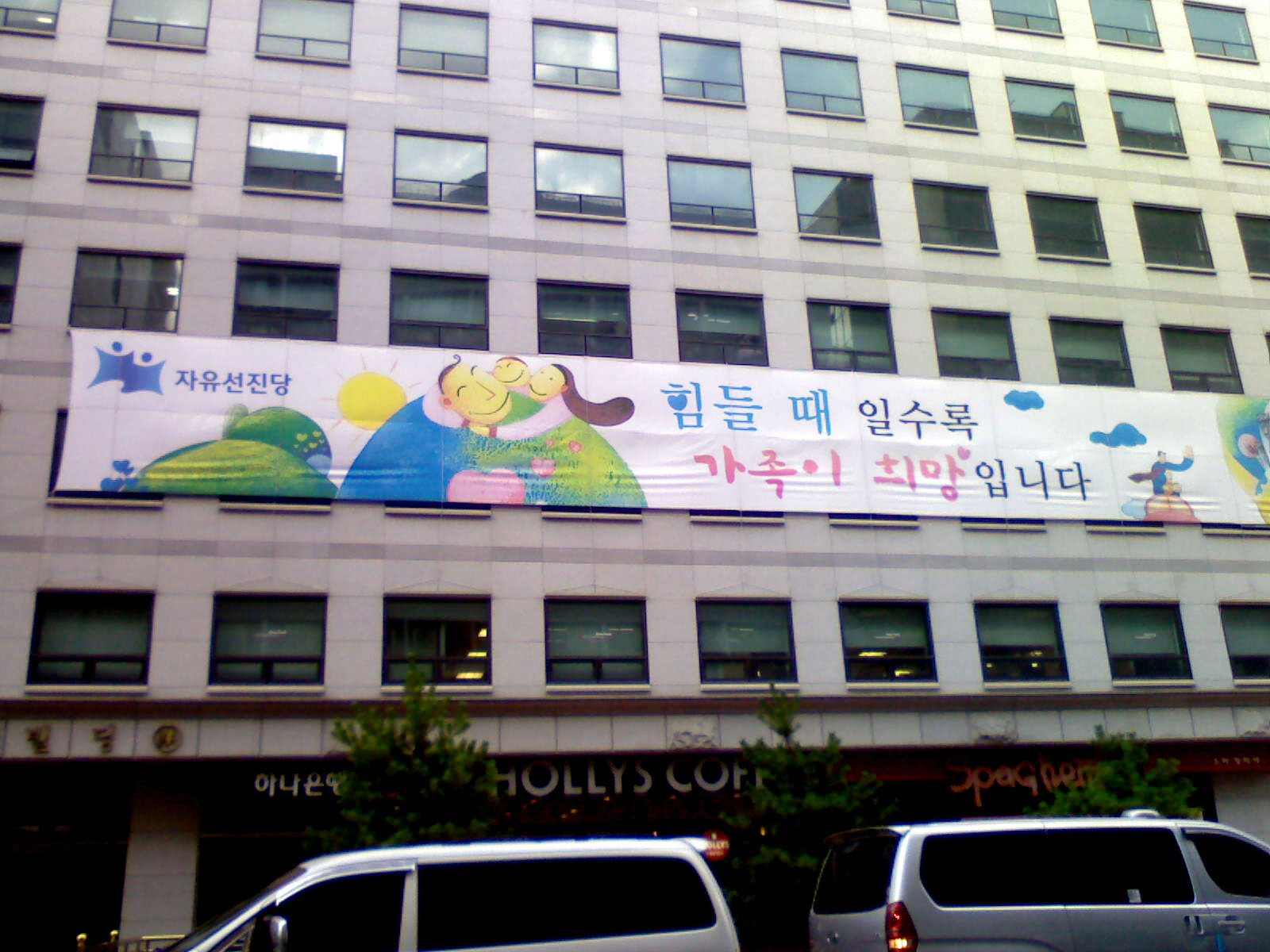
Liberty Forward Party headquarters

In the 2012 National Assembly election the party lost all but five of its 18 seats, declining to the fourth position, well behind the left-leaning Unified Progressive Party (which gained seats). Party leader Sim Dae-pyung announced his resignation after the party's poor performance.

== Electoral results ==
Election	Leader	Constituency				Party list				Seats		Position	Status
Election	Leader	Votes	%	Seats	+/-	Votes	%	Seats	+/-	No.	+/–	Position	Status
2008	Lee Hoi-chang	984,751	5.72	14 / 245	new	1,173,463	6.85	4 / 54	new	18 / 299	new	4th	Opposition
2012	Lee Hoi-chang	474,001	2.20	3 / 246	▼11	690,754	3.24	2 / 54	▼2	5 / 300	▼13	4th	Opposition
