= People First Party (South Korea) =

2006–2008 political party in South Korea

People First Party 국민중심당
- Leader: Sim Dae-pyung
- Founded: January 17, 2006
- Dissolved: February 12, 2008
- Split from: United Liberal Democrats
- Merged into: Advancement Unification Party
- Headquarters: Yeouido-dong, Yeongdeungpo District, Seoul
- Ideology: Conservatism (South Korean)
- Colours: Pink

Website
- http://www.mypfp.or.kr/

- People First Party
- Hangul: 국민중심당
- Hanja: 國民中心黨
- RR: Gungmin jungsimdang
- MR: Kungmin chungsimdang

The People First Party (Korean: 국민중심당) was a political party in South Korea, led by Sim Dae-pyung and Shin Kook-hwan. A breakaway from the United Liberal Democrats, its profile was conservative. The party was based in the central provinces of Chungcheong. It had five seats in the South Korean parliament.

On February 12, 2008, the People's First Party announced that it was merging with the Liberty Forward Party led by Lee Hoi-chang. Because the new party took the Liberty Forward Party name, the party was essentially dissolved.
