= Democratic Labor Party (South Korea) =

2000–2011 political party in South Korea

Democratic Labor Party 민주노동당
- Leader: Kwon Young-ghil
- Floor leader: Kang Gi-gap
- Founded: 30 January 2000
- Dissolved: 13 December 2011
- Preceded by: Construction National Victory 21 (1999)
- Succeeded by: Unified Progressive Party
- Headquarters: Jongdo Building, 25-1 Mullaedong2-ga, Yeongdeungpo-gu, Seoul
- Ideology: Progressivism (South Korean); Factions: Democratic socialism (PD); Korean nationalism (NL)
- Political position: Left-wing
- Colours: Orange

Korean name
- Hangul: 민주노동당
- Hanja: 民主勞動黨
- RR: Minju nodongdang
- MR: Minju nodongdang

The Democratic Labor Party (Korean: 민주노동당) was a progressive and nationalist political party in South Korea. It was founded in January 2000, in the effort to create a political wing for the Korean Confederation of Trade Unions which was considered more left-wing and more independent of the two union federations in South Korea. Its party president was Kwon Young-ghil, Kang Gi-gap, and Lee Jung-hee. In December 2011, the party merged into the Unified Progressive Party.

In the South Korean political history, DLP is considered as the ancestor of all of modern day left-leaning political parties such as Justice Party and Progressive Party.

== History ==
=== 1997-2004 ===
The predecessor of the Democratic Labor Party was People's Victory for 21st Century, established in 1997. People's Victory for 21st Century nominated KCTU Chairman Kwon Young-ghil as its candidate in the 1997 presidential election, but the campaign was unsuccessful. However, after reorganizing into the Democratic Labor Party just before the 2000 general election, the party made significant progress in several constituencies.

In the 2002 local elections, the Democratic Labor Party garnered an average of 8% of the votes, establishing itself as a major political force. The party gained support from prominent cultural figures, including director Bong Joon-ho, and attracted significant backing from young people and the working class who were disillusioned with the politics of the two dominant parties; the democratic party and the conservative Hannara-party. In the 2004 general election, the Democratic Labor Party gained 10 seats, becoming the third-largest party in the National Assembly.

=== 2004-2008 ===
After its success in the 2004 general election, the Democratic Labor Party faced internal conflict between the PD faction and the NL faction. The PD faction formed the social democratic "Pyeongdeung-faction (Korean: 평등파; lit. 'Equality faction')", while the NL faction established the pro-North Korean "Jaju-faction (Korean: 자주파; lit. 'Autonomy faction')". The Pyeongdeung-faction primarily promoted social welfare policies, such as "free welfare" and "free medical care." In contrast, the Jaju-faction focused on a Korean reunification agenda, which centered on anti-Americanism.

The Pyeongdeung-faction gained public support due to its popular welfare policies; however, within the party, it struggled to build strong support among members because of its individualistic organizational style and perceived elitist bias. Conversely, the Jaju-faction had lower public support but cultivated significant internal support due to its communitarian culture.

In the 2006 leadership election, the Pyeongdeung-faction nominated former National Assembly member Cho Seung-soo as their candidate for party leader, while the Jaju-faction nominated labor activist Moon Sung-hyun. The election was closely contested, with Moon Sung-hyun narrowly winning 53.6% of the vote to Cho Seung-soo's 46.4%, giving the Jaju Faction the upper hand in the party.

Controversy soon followed. Lee Yong-dae, the leader of the Jaju-faction, who was also a policy committee chairman, blocked the Pyeongdeung-faction's resolution criticizing North Korea for its nuclear test. Chairman Lee argued that North Korea's nuclear weapons were defensive measures against American imperialism, which was severely condemned by media. Furthermore, during the 2007 presidential election, the Jaju-faction pushed an unpopular slogan advocating for "a federation of North and South Korea (Korean: 코리아 연방)". This contributed crushing defeat for the party, receiving only 3% of the popular vote.

The defeat in the presidential election prompted the Pyeongdeung-faction to establish an emergency committee led by Sim Sang-jung. One of the key issues addressed by this committee was the "Ilsimhoe Incident (Korean: 일심회 사건)," a 2006 controversy in which some party members were found to have contacted executives of North Korea's Workers' Party and provided them some critical information about key party members. The Pyeongdeung-faction advocated for the immediate expulsion of those involved, while the Jaju-faction opposed such actions, arguing that the party should not succumb to anti-communist pressure.

Ultimately, a narrow vote favored the Jaju-faction's stance. Frustrated with the outcome, the Pyeongdeung-faction left the Democratic Labor Party in February 2008 to establish the New Progressive Party, citing irreconcilable differences with the Jaju-faction's pro-North Korean tendencies. The party split proved detrimental to both factions. In the 2008 general election, the Democratic Labor Party won only five seats, while the New Progressive Party failed to secure any seats.

=== 2008-2011 ===
After the crushing defeat in the 2008 general election, contrary to experts' expectations, the Democratic Labor Party quickly regained its footing. Amid growing public discontent with the Lee Myung-bak administration's ultra-conservative and pro-American policies, the Democratic Labor Party restored public trust by leading protests against the United States–Korea Free Trade Agreement. The controversy surrounding key agreements in the Korea-US FTA also bolstered support for the anti-American stance of the Jaju-faction.

The Democratic Labor Party further strengthened its position by coordinating protests with the KCTU against the Lee Myung-bak administration's anti-labor policies. Simultaneously, it adopted some policies previously championed by the Equality Faction, such as advocating for "free school meals." Prominent party figures, like Lee Jung-hee, gained public attention by vocally opposing the conservative Grand National Party in the National Assembly.

In the 2010 local elections, the Democratic Labor Party achieved a significant victory, gaining 150 seats in total—the best performance by a left-wing party in Korea to date. Many of these victories were attributed to the formation of an "opposition alliance (Korean: 야권연대)" with the liberal Democratic Party. However, the division within the left-wing camp, split between the New Progressive Party and the Democratic Labor Party, posed challenges during the election.

In response to this fragmentation, the Democratic Labor Party initiated efforts to reunite with the New Progressive Party in 2011. Around the same time, the Participation Party, founded by former Minister of Health and Welfare Rhyu Si-min, also joined the DLP's left-wing reorganization efforts. In December 2011, the three parties agreed to merge, leading to the establishment of the Unified Progressive Party.

== Political position ==
In June 2011, the Democratic Labor Party removed "socialism" from the party code and replaced the phrase "socialism" (사회주의) with "progressive democracy" (진보적 민주주의), a liberal ideology.

=== Factions ===
DLP was divided into the Jaju-faction (자주파; lit. 'Autonomy faction'), which advocated Left-wing nationalism, and the Pyeongdeung-faction (평등파; lit. 'Equality faction'), which advocated democratic socialism.

==== Jaju ====
The Jaju-faction operated as a single caucus, National Union (민주주의 민족통일 전국연합; lit. 'National Union for Democracy and National Unification'). It was divided into sub-groups based on regional activities, such as Eastern Gyongggi Union (경기동부연합), Gwangju-Jeonnam Union (광주전남연합), Ulsan Union (울산연합), etc. The Jaju-faction became the mainstream of the party after 2004. Pronounced politicians of the Jaju-faction included Lee Jung-hee, Kim Seon-dong, and Lee Yong-dae.

==== Pyeongdeung ====
The Pyeongdeung-faction was severely divided into various caucuses. The most representative group was Jeonjin (평등사회로 전진하는 활동가 연합; lit. 'Union of Activists Advancing to Equal Society'), which advocated eco-socialism. Jeonjin succeeded Daejangjeong (대장정; lit. 'Long March'), a left-wing Althusserian student group in Seoul National University.

==== Yeondae ====
Yeondae (자율과 연대; lit. 'Autonomy and Solidarity') was a centre-left caucus, advocated a Nordic-style social market economy and western social democracy. Its leader was Joo Dea-hwan, a former party chairman. The most radical caucus in Pyeongdeung-faction was Haebang yeondae (노동해방실천연대; lit. 'Solidarity for Worker's Liberation'), which advocated Eurocommunism and Neo-marxism.

==== Dahamkke ====
Dahamkke (다함께; lit. 'All together', current Worker's Solidarity) was also belonged to the Pyeongdeung-faction. However, it defended the Jaju-faction in major decisions, which made them classified as a neutral caucus. Dahamkke was an official branch office of Socialist Workers Party in United Kingdom. Dahamkke followed Tony Cliff's thought on Marxism, which called as neo-Trotskysm or International socialism.

== Election results ==
=== President ===
Election	Candidate	Votes	%	Result
2002	Kwon Young-ghil	957,148	3.9	Not elected
2007	Kwon Young-ghil	712,121	3.02	Not elected

=== Legislature ===
Election	Leader	Constituency				Party list				Seats		Position	Status
Election	Leader	Votes	%	Seats	+/-	Votes	%	Seats	+/-	No.	+/–	Position	Status
2000	Kwon Young-ghil	223,261	1.18	0 / 227	new			0 / 46	new	0 / 273	new	5th	Extra-parliamentary
2004	Kwon Young-ghil	920,229	4.31	2 / 243	▲2	2,774,061	13.03	8 / 56	▲10	10 / 299	▲10	3rd	Opposition
2008	Cheon Young-se	583,665	3.39	2 / 245	Steady	973,445	5.68	3 / 54	▼5	5 / 299	▼10	5th	Opposition

=== Local ===
Election	Leader	Metropolitan mayor/Governor	Provincial legislature	Municipal mayor	Municipal legislature
2002	Kwon Young-ghil	0 / 16	11 / 682	2 / 232	
2006	Moon Sung-hyeon	0 / 16	15 / 733	0 / 230	66 / 2,888
2010	Kang Gi-gap	0 / 16	24 / 761	3 / 228	115 / 2,888

== See also ==
- Unified Progressive Party
- Politics of South Korea
- Lists of political parties
- Kwon Young-ghil
- Social Democratic Party (Japan) - DLP interacted with major Japanese social democrats and democratic socialist politicians, including Mizuho Fukushima.
