= Democratic Party (South Korea, 2008) =

2008–2011 political party in South Korea

Democratic Party 민주당
- Founded: 17 February 2008 (Note: as the United Democratic Party); 7 May 2008 (Note: as the Democratic Party)
- Dissolved: 15 December 2011
- Merger of: Grand Unified Democratic New Party; Democratic Party
- Merged into: Democratic United Party
- Headquarters: 15-16 Yeouido-dong, Yeongdeungpo-gu, Seoul, South Korea
- Ideology: Liberalism (South Korean)
- Political position: Centre to centre-left
- Colours: Green; Green

Website
- minjoo.kr (Korean) englishdp.tistory.com (English)

- Democratic Party
- Hangul: 민주당
- Hanja: 民主黨
- RR: Minjudang
- MR: Minjudang

United Democratic Party
- Hangul: 통합민주당
- Hanja: 統合民主黨
- RR: Tonghap minjudang
- MR: T'onghap minjudang

The Democratic Party (DP; Korean: 민주당; RR: Minjudang) was a liberal political party in South Korea. Formerly named the United Democratic Party (UDP; 통합민주당), it was the main opposition party in the 18th Assembly. In late 2011, it merged into the Democratic United Party.

== History ==
Logo of the United Democratic Party

The party was originally formed as the Uri Party (Yeollin Uri-dang) when loyalists to president Roh Moo-hyun in the Millennium Democratic Party chose to break ranks from other party members who showed indifferent support for the administration. Some 42 out of 103 lawmakers of the Millennium Democratic Party joined the new party, and 5 lawmakers from the Grand National Party also joined, seeking to complete political reforms. As a result of the 2004 Parliamentary election, the party won an outright majority in the National Assembly by winning 152 of 299 seats. It was the first time in over 40 years that a centre-left party had won a majority in the legislature.

On 18 August 2007, the delegates of the Uri Party decided to disband the party and merge with the newly created liberal party Grand Unified Democratic New Party (대통합민주신당; 大統合民主新黨). After a year, the Grand Unified Democratic New Party merged with the Democratic Party on 17 February 2008, to form the United Democratic Party (Tonghapminjudang). In July 2008, the party changed its name to the Democratic Party.

In local elections in 2010, the Democratic Party scored a victory in eight mayoral and gubernatorial posts, including the Inchon mayorship.

On 16 December 2011, the DP merged with the minor Citizens Unity Party to form the Democratic United Party. The Korean Confederation of Trade Unions also participated in this formation.

== Presidents of DP ==
- Preceding party: United New Democratic Party & Democratic Party (2007)
1. Sohn Hak-kyu & Park Sang-Chun (17 February 2008 – 29 May 2008)
2. Chung Sye-kyun (30 May 2008 – 3 October 2010)
3. Sohn Hak-kyu (3 October 2010 – Incumbent)
- Succeeding party: Democratic United Party

== Election results ==
Election	Leader	Constituency			Party list			Seats	Position	Status
Election	Leader	Votes	%	Seats	Votes	%	Seats	Seats	Position	Status
2008	Sohn Hak-kyu; Park Sang-chun	4,977,508	28.92	66 / 245	4,313,645	25.18	15 / 54	81 / 299	2nd	Opposition
