= Results of the 2010 South Korean local elections =

This article presents more detail of the results in the 2010 South Korean local elections, breaking down results by metropolitan mayoral and gubernatorial elections.

== Metropolitan mayoral elections ==
=== Seoul ===
ranking	Cand. #	Candidates	Party	Votes	Percentage	Result
1	1	Oh Se-hoon	Grand National	2,086,127	47.43%	Elected
2	2	Han Myung-sook	Democratic	2,059,715	46.83%	
3	7	Roh Hoe-chan	New Progressive	143,459	3.26%	
4	3	Chee Shang-wuk	Liberty Forward	90,032	2.04%	
5	8	Suk Chong-hyun	Future Hope	18,339	0.41%	
Turnout		53.90%	Total votes	4,426,182	100%	Inefficiency
Invalid votes		28,510		Abstention	3,785,279	0.64%

=== Gwangju ===
ranking	Cand. #	Candidates	Party	Votes	Percentage	Result
1	2	Gang Un-tae	Democratic	297,003	56.73%	Elected
2	8	Chung Chan-young	People's Participation	75,830	14.48%	
3	1	Chung Young-hwa	Grand National	74,490	14.22%	
4	5	Chung Won-seop	Democratic Labor	39,455	7.53%	
5	7	Yoon Nan-sil	New Progressive	30,834	5.89%	
6	9	Cho Hong-kyu	Peace and Democracy	5,871	1.12%	
Turnout		49.76%	Total votes	523,483	100%	Efficiency
Invalid votes		6,418		Abstention	535,012	98.79%

=== Daegu ===
ranking	Cand. #	Candidates	Party	Votes	Percentage	Result
1	1	Kim Bum-il	Grand National	633,118	72.92%	Elected
2	2	Lee Sung-chun	Democratic	146,458	16.86%	
3	7	Cho Myung-lay	New Progressive	88,599	10.20%	
Turnout		45.94%	Total votes	868,175	100%	Efficiency
Invalid votes		17,860		Abstention	1,042,800	97.98%

=== Daejeon ===
ranking	Cand. #	Candidates	Party	Votes	Percentage	Result
1	3	Yum Hong-cheol	Liberty Forward	276,122	46.67%	Elected
2	1	Park Sung-hyo	Grand National	168,616	28.50%	
3	2	Kim Won-young	Democratic	137,751	23.28%	
4	7	Kim Yoon-ki	New Progressive	9,074	1.53%	
Turnout		52.92%	Total votes	591,563	100%	Efficiency
Invalid votes		5,120		Abstention	530,864	99.14%

=== Busan ===
ranking	Cand. #	Candidates	Party	Votes	Percentage	Result
1	1	Heo Nam-sik	Grand National	770,507	55.42%	Elected
2	2	Kim Chung-kil	Democratic	619,565	44.57%	
Turnout		49.48%	Total votes	1,390,072	100%	Efficiency
Invalid votes		20,054		Abstention	1,439,769	98.58%

=== Ulsan ===
ranking	Cand. #	Candidates	Party	Votes	Percentage	Result
1	1	Park Maeng-woo	Grand National	279,421	61.26%	Elected
2	2	Kim Chiang-hyun	Democratic Labor	133,437	29.25%	
3	7	Roh Ok-huy	New Progressive	43,256	9.48%	
Turnout		55.09%	Total votes	456,114	100%	Efficiency
Invalid votes		376,702		Abstention	5,989	98.70%

=== Incheon ===
ranking	Cand. #	Candidates	Party	Votes	Percentage	Result
1	2	Song Young-kil	Democratic	556,902	52.69%	Elected
2	1	Ahn Shang-soo	Grand National	469,040	44.38%	
3	7	Kim Shang-hah	New Progressive	19,580	1.85%	
4	8	Beak Suk-doo	Peace and Democracy	11,258	1.06%	
Turnout		50.9%	Total votes	1,056,780	100%	Efficiency
Invalid votes		10,651		Abstention	1,029,422	99.00%

== Gubernatorial elections ==
=== Gangwon-do ===
ranking	Cand. #	Candidates	Party	Votes	Percentage	Result
1	2	Lee Kwang-jae	Democratic	388,443	54.36%	Elected
2	1	Lee Kay-chin	Grand National	326,111	45.63%	
-	-	Eum Jae-cheol	Democratic Labor	-	-	Withdrawn
Turnout		62.30%	Total votes	741,724	100%	Efficiency
Invalid votes		27,170		Abstention	448,785	99.00%

=== Gyeonggi-do ===
ranking	Cand. #	Candidates	Party	Votes	Percentage	Result
1	1	Kim Moon-soo	Grand National	2,271,492	52.20%	Elected
2	8	Yoo Shi-min	People's Participation	2,079,892	47.79%	
-	-	Shim Shang-chung	New Progressive	-	-	Withdrawn
Turnout		51.76%	Total votes	4,351,384	100%	Efficiency
Invalid votes		183,387		Abstention	4,227,069	95.93%

=== Gyeongsangnam-do ===
ranking	Cand. #	Candidates	Party	Votes	Percentage	Result
1	7	Kim Doo-kwan	Independent	812,336	53.50%	Elected
2	1	Lee Dal-kun	Grand National	705,986	46.49%	
Turnout		61.42%	Total votes	1,518,322	100%	Efficiency
Invalid votes		31,368		Abstention	956,703	97.98%

=== Gyeongsangbuk-do ===
ranking	Cand. #	Candidates	Party	Votes	Percentage	Result
1	1	Kim Kwan-young	Grand National	913,812	75.36%	Elected
2	2	Hong Ui-lak	Democratic	143,347	11.82%	
3	7	Yoon Sung-chan	People's Participation	87,346	7.20%	
4	5	Yoon Byeong-Tae	Democratic Labor	68,015	5.60%	
Turnout		59.38%	Total votes	1,212,520	100%	Efficiency
Invalid votes		48,071		Abstention	862,314	96.19%

=== Jeollanam-do ===
ranking	Cand. #	Candidates	Party	Votes	Percentage	Result
1	2	Park Chun-young	Democratic	629,984	68.30%	Elected
2	1	Kim Tae-sik	Grand National	123,548	13.39%	
3	5	Park Hung-doo	Democratic Labor	100,581	10.90%	
4	7	Kim Kyoung-jae	Peace and Democracy	68,220	7.39%	
Turnout		64.28%	Total votes	922,333	100%	Efficiency
Invalid votes		45,005		Abstention	537,564	95.35%

=== Jeollabuk-do ===
ranking	Cand. #	Candidates	Party	Votes	Percentage	Result
1	2	Kim Wan-ju	Democratic	569,980	68.67%	Elected
2	1	Chung Un-chun	Grand National	151,064	18.20%	
3	5	Hah Youn-hoh	Democratic Labor	52,331	6.30%	
4	7	Yum Kyung-suk	New Progressive	35,565	4.28%	
5	8	Kim Tae-sik	Peace and Democracy	20,990	2.52%	
Turnout		59.34%	Total votes	829,930	100%	Efficiency
Invalid votes		26,181		Abstention	586,694	96.94%

=== Chungcheongnam-do ===
ranking	Cand. #	Candidates	Party	Votes	Percentage	Result
1	2	Ahn Hee-chung	Democratic	367,288	42.25%	Elected
2	3	Park Shang-dohn	Liberty Forward	347,265	39.94%	
3	1	Park Hay-chun	Grand National	154,723	17.79%	
Turnout		56.52%	Total votes	869,276	100%	Efficiency
Invalid votes		32,587		Abstention	693,724	96.39%

=== Chungcheongbuk-do ===
ranking	Cand. #	Candidates	Party	Votes	Percentage	Result
1	2	Lee Shi-chong	Democratic	349,913	51.22%	Elected
2	1	Chung Woo-taek	Grand National	313,646	45.91%	
3	7	Kim Paik-Kyu	New Progressive	19,551	2.86%	
Turnout		58.83%	Total votes	683,110	100%	Efficiency
Invalid votes		13,283		Abstention	487,418	98.09%

=== Jeju-do ===
ranking	Cand. #	Candidates	Party	Votes	Percentage	Result
1	9	Woo Keun-min	Independent	110,588	41.40%	Elected
2	8	Hyun Myung-kwan	Independent	108,336	40.55%	
3	2	Go Hui-bum	Democratic	48,179	18.03%	
-	-	Kang Shang-joo	Independent	-	-	Withdrawn
Turnout		65.08%	Total votes	267,103	100%	Efficiency
Invalid votes		8,918		Abstention	148,077	96.77%
