= Yang Gyeong-gyu =

South Korean politician (born 1959)

- 양경규

Leader of the Justice Party
- Incumbent
- Assumed office 29 August 2026
- Preceded by: Kwon Yeong-guk

Member of the National Assembly
- In office 29 January 2024 – 30 May 2024
- Constituency: Proportional representation

Personal details
- Born: 14 July 1959 (age 67)
- Party: Justice Party (2015–)
- Other political affiliations: Labor Politics Solidarity; Democratic Labor Party

Korean name
- Hangul: 양경규
- RR: Yang Gyeonggyu
- MR: Yang Kyŏnggyu

Yang Kyung-kyu (Korean: 양경규, born 14 July 1959) is a South Korean politician and former labor activist. A member of the Justice Party, he represents the party's radical faction and advocates for democratic socialism, a left-wing ideology.

== History ==
He began his union activities in 1987 as a member of the Seoul Chamber of Commerce and Industry (SCCI) labor union and embarked on a full-time career in the labor movement in 1988, participating in a 55-day strike as the union's vice-chairperson.

From 1995 to 1999, while serving as the 4th and 5th Chairperson of the Federation of Specialised Technical Workers' Unions, he participated as a KCTU representative in the Presidential Commission on Industrial Relations Reform, the first government-affiliated committee the KCTU joined in 1996. Additionally, as the KCTU’s Political Committee Chairperson, he oversaw an initiative to establish workers as an independent political force, a key objective of the organisation. In particular, he played a leading role in the founding of Construction National Victory 21 that same year and served as the chairman of the organising committee for Kwon Young-ghil's presidential campaign.

In 2000, he was elected as the 3rd Chairman of the Korean Federation of Public Transport and Social Service Workers' Unions with 53% of the vote.

Elected as Vice President of the KCTU in 1999, he served concurrently as chair of the political and education committees and as the inaugural dean of the KCTU Labor College; he subsequently served as a vice leader of the Democratic Labor Party upon its founding in 2000.

In 2001, while serving as chairman of the Public Sector Union Federation, Yang Gyeong-gyu led general strikes in the public sector, including a pilots' union strike, resulting in his arrest. He later serves as the Chairperson of the Korean Federation of Public Service Workers and was formerly member of the Seoul Chamber of Commerce and Industry Union.

Yang Kyung-kyu served on the KCTU’s emergency steering committee and led the union’s delegation to the protests against the WTO in Hong Kong. He was detained there but was ultimately released due to insufficient evidence.

The Korean Federation of Public Transport and Social Service Workers' Unions, Korean Democratic Bus Workers' Union, Korean Democratic Taxi Workers' Union Federation, and Preparatory Committee for the Integrated Freight Union under the Korean Confederation of Trade Unions (KCTU) were integrated into the Korean Federation of Public Transport Workers' Unions in January 2007.

In January 2007,he ran for the presidency of the KCTU but was unsuccessful.

Subsequently, Yang Gyeong-gyu served as director of the KCTU education centre.

Following the split of the Democratic Labor Party in 2008, Yang continued to advocate for the integration of progressive forces. In 2015 merger with the Justice Party, the National Gathering, Labor Politics Solidarity and Progressive Gathering+ to form a new mass progressive party.

In December 2012, he formed a group called Council for Promoting a Workers' Party which sought unify the fragmented progressive political landscape and create a new path of action for the workers' political movement.

In November 2013, he united various labor-oriented political forces to form the Labor Politics Solidarity and served as its representative.As the representative of Labor Politics Solidarity, Yang Kyung-kyu continued to advocate for unify progressive parties and expand new forms of political activism within the labor movement contributing to the founding of the new Justice Party on 22 November 2015.

He ran in the 2019 Justice Party leadership election but was defeated by Sim Sang-jung. Yang Kyung-kyu received 16.4% of the vote, behind Sim Sang-jung, who secured 83.6%. During the primary, Yang advocated for democratic socialism and pledged to shift the party further to the left.

Following the resignation of Ryu Ho-jeong, a proportional representation member of the 21st National Assembly, in 2024, he entered the National Assembly as a proportional representation lawmaker.

In August 2026, he was elected leader of the Justice Party succeeding Kwon Yeong-guk as leader.

== Criminal convictions ==
He has been convicted on two accounts including obstruction of business.

== Electoral history ==
Year	Election	Assembly	Office	Constituency	Party	Votes	Vote share	Rank	Result	Notes
2016	General election	20th	Member of the National Assembly	Proportional representation	Justice Party	1,719,891	7.23%	10th (proportional representation)	Lost	Ineligible for succession
2020	General election	21st	Member of the National Assembly	Proportional representation	Justice Party	2,697,956	9.67%	8th (proportional representation)	Elected	Elected; succeeded Ryu Ho-jeong

== See also ==
- List of members of the National Assembly (South Korea), 2020–2024
- Democratic Labor Party
- Korean Confederation of Trade Unions
- Labor Politics Solidarity
