= Cho Jun-ho (politician) =

South Korean politician (born 1958)

- 조준호

Co-leader of the Progressive Justice Party
- In office September 2012 – 30 July 2013
- Preceded by: Office established
- Succeeded by: Cheon Ho-sun

Co-leader of the Unified Progressive Party
- In office February 2012 – 12 May 2012
- Preceded by: Office established
- Succeeded by: Kang Gi-gap

Chairman of the Korean Confederation of Trade Unions
- In office February 2006 – February 2007
- Preceded by: Lee Su-ho
- Succeeded by: Lee Seok-haeng

Personal details
- Born: 23 October 1958 (age 67)
- Party: Justice Party
- Other political affiliations: Unified Progressive Party; Democratic Labor Party

Cho Jun-ho (Korean: 조준호, born October 23, 1958) is a South Korean politician. After serving as chairperson of the Korean Confederation of Trade Unions (KCTU), he joined the Democratic Labor Party and ran in the 2004 South Korean legislative election for the Hwaseong-si Gap constituency in Gyeonggi Province, where the Kia Motors factory at which he worked was located. However, he failed to win a seat. Subsequently, he served as a co-leader of the Unified Progressive Party, and later as a co-leader of the Preparatory Committee for a Progressive Justice Party, formed by defectors from the Unified Progressive Party.

== Co-leader of the Unified Progressive Party ==
He served as a co-leader of the Unified Progressive Party, representing the Korean Confederation of Trade Unions (KCTU). He was appointed to chair the fact-finding committee during the party's internal crisis over alleged proportional representation rigging and was physically assaulted by a party member who opposed the findings of the investigation he led.

== Career history ==
In 1997, Cho served as chairman of the Automobile Industry Labor Union. In 1998, he became the inaugural senior vice chairman of the Federation of Korean Metalworkers' Trade Unions. In 2003, he became a member of the Steering Committee of the Kia Motors Labor Union. From 2006 to 2007 he served as Chairperson of the Korean Confederation of Trade Unions (KCTU). In 2012, he served as co-leader of the Unified Progressive Party. In 2012 he served as co-leader of the Progressive Justice Party alongside Roh Hoe-chan.

== Electoral history ==
| Year | Election | Assembly | Office | Constituency | Party | Votes | Vote share | Rank | Result | Notes |
|---|---|---|---|---|---|---|---|---|---|---|
| 2008 | 18th legislative election | 18th | National Assembly member | Hwaseong-si Gap | Democratic Labor Party | 4,135 | 7.41% | 4th | Lost | |
| 2016 | 20th legislative election | 20th | National Assembly member | Gunsan-si | Justice Party | 4,634 | 3.60% | 5th | Lost | |
