= Cho Myung-chul =

South Korean politician (born 1959)

19th Governor of South Pyeongan Province
- In office 15 July 2022 – August 2024
- Preceded by: Lee Myung-woo

Member of the National Assembly
- In office 30 May 2012 – 29 May 2016
- Constituency: Proportional representation

Personal details
- Born: 2 April 1959 (age 67) Pyongyang, North Korea
- Citizenship: South Korea; North Korea (formerly)
- Party: People Power Party
- Other political affiliations: Liberty Korea Party (until 2020)
- Education: Kim Il Sung University

Korean name
- Hangul: 조명철
- Hanja: 趙明哲
- RR: Jo Myeongcheol
- MR: Cho Myŏngch'ŏl

Cho Myung-chul (Korean: 조명철; born 2 April 1959) is a South Korean politician who has served as the nominal governor of South Pyeongan Province since 15 July 2022. A North Korean defector and former professor at Kim Il Sung University, he has held several political positions in South Korea pertaining to Korean reunification and inter-Korean dialogue. In 2012, he became the first North Korean defector to be elected to the South Korean National Assembly. He served as a representative of the proportional representation constituency from the Saenuri Party (later the Liberty Korea Party) until the end of his tenure in 2016.

== Life in North Korea and China ==
Cho Myung-chul was born in Pyongyang, North Korea, on 2 April 1959. He was the second of three brothers. His father was a politician who served as the country's minister of construction and his mother was a professor at the People's University of Economics. Cho studied at Kim Il Sung University from September 1983 to October 1987, graduating with an associate doctoral degree. He was appointed to teach at the university's department of economics immediately after his graduation. In August 1992, Cho was given the opportunity to teach at Nankai University in Tianjin, China, for a two-year exchange program. He later described his experience living in China as "positive" in comparison to his "negative" life in North Korea, and this contrast ultimately led to his decision to defect as the end of the exchange drew near.

On 18 July 1994, Cho defected to South Korea via a flight from Hong Kong. Cho claims that the North Korean government's response to his defection was "muted", with minor attempts at making it appear as though Cho had returned to North Korea. According to Cho, a paper was published under his name after he defected, and rumours were spread that he had been involved in a traffic accident while teaching in China.

== Life in South Korea ==
=== Academic career ===
Cho became a research fellow at the Korea Institute for International Economic Policy shortly after arriving in South Korea. He later served as the director of the institute's International Development Cooperation Center. From June 2011 to March 2012, he served as the 21st director of the Ministry of Unification's Unification Education Institute.

Controversy arose around Cho's educational credentials as North Korea and South Korea have different post-secondary education systems. In North Korea, postgraduate students earn an associate doctoral degree after an additional two-year program, and a doctoral degree after an additional three-year program. The former is unique to North Korea, and so there were discussions among Cho's employers as to whether his associate doctoral degree should be recognized as equivalent to a doctoral degree in South Korea. The South Korean government ultimately recognized Cho as possessing from Kim Il Sung University the equivalent of a South Korean doctoral degree.

=== Political career ===
Cho was elected to the South Korean National Assembly in the 2012 legislative election, representing the proportional representation constituency as a member of the Saenuri Party, later known as the Liberty Korea Party. This marked the first time that a North Korean defector had been elected to the legislature. During his tenure, Cho focused on improving the lives of North Korean defectors in South Korea and promoting Korean reunification. He also sharply criticized the rule of North Korean supreme leader Kim Jong Un. Cho did not run for reelection and vacated his seat upon the dissolution of the National Assembly on 29 May 2016.

South Korean president Yoon Suk-yeol appointed Cho as the nominal governor of South Pyeongan Province on 15 July 2022. The position is mostly ceremonial as the province is under the de facto control of North Korea.
