= Kim Jun-woo =

South Korean lawyer and politician (born 1979)

- 김준우

Leader of the Justice Party
- In office 14 November 2023 (Note: acting until the 13 February 2024) – 27 May 2024
- Preceded by: Lee Jeong-mi; Bae Jin-gyo (acting)
- Succeeded by: Kwon Yeong-guk

Personal details
- Born: 17 January 1979 (age 47)
- Party: Independent (2008–2011,2012–2013,2021–2023,2025–)
- Other political affiliations: Justice Party (2015–2021, 2023–2025); Labor Party (2013–2015); New Progressive Party (2011–2012); Democratic Labor Party (before 2008)

Kim Jun-woo (Korean: 김준우, born 17 January 1979) is a South Korean lawyer and politician. He served as the leader of the Justice Party from 14 November 2023 until the 27 May 2024.

== Education ==
- In 1997, he graduated from Daeil Foreign Language High School.
- In 2004, he graduated from Korea University department of Spanish language and literature and department of law (double major).
- In 2007, he completed masters in Social Law at Korea University.
- In 2013, he passed the 2nd bar examination.
- In 2015, he completed his doctoral coursework in Labor Law at Kyung Hee University.

== Career ==
In 2016, he became the full-time deputy secretary-general of the Lawyers for a Democratic Society and an advisor to the Future Medical Research Foundation. In 2018, he served as ambassador for Civil Society Organizations delegation of the European Union to South Korea. In 2020, he was selected as an "Excellent Lawyer" by the Korean Bar Association. He joined Deoksu Law Firm and became an adjunct professor at Yonsei University Law School. On 24 May 2020, he was appointed a member of the Justice Party Innovation Committee. He later became an auditor of the Justice Party Research Institute. On 15 November 2023, Kim was appointed Emergency Response Committee Chair of the Justice Party. On 3 February 2024, he was elected leader of the Green-Justice Party. He left office on 27 May 2024 and was succeeded by Kwon Yeong-guk.

== Election history ==
Year	Election	Assembly	Position	Constituency	Party	Votes received	Vote share	Ranking	Elected
2024	2024 South Korean legislative election	22nd	Member of the National Assembly	Proportional representation	Green Justice Party	609,313	2.14%	6th on list	Not elected
