= 2025 South Korean presidential election =

Snap election in South Korea

- 3 June 2025
- Opinion polls
- Registered: 44,391,871
- Turnout: 79.38% (▲2.30 pp)
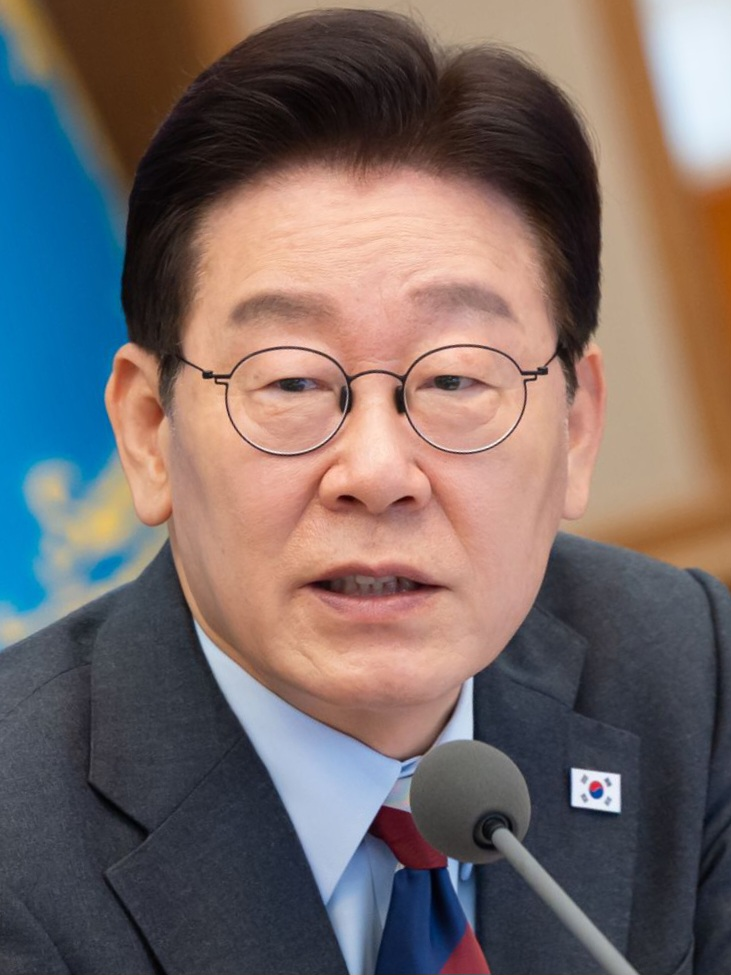

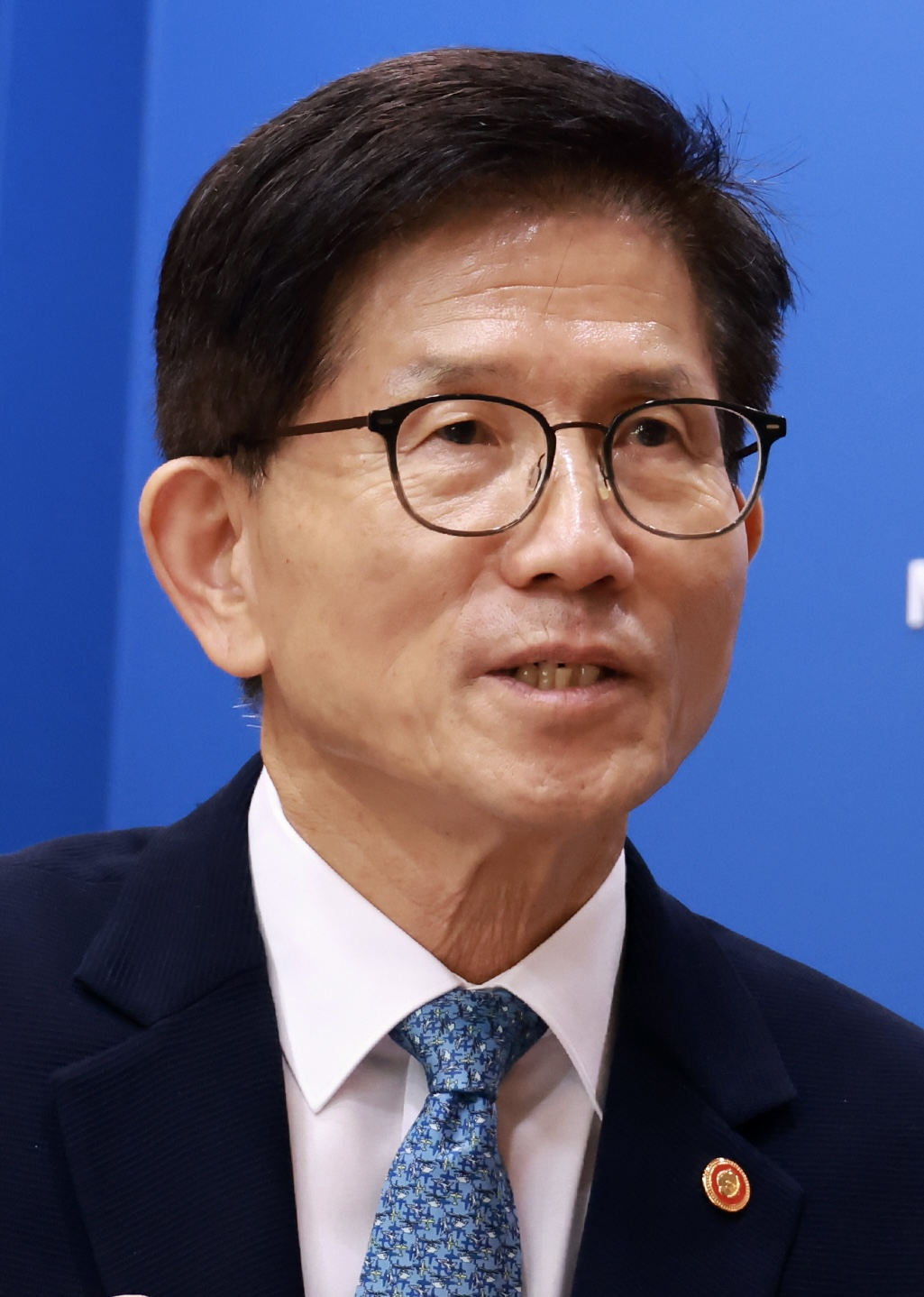

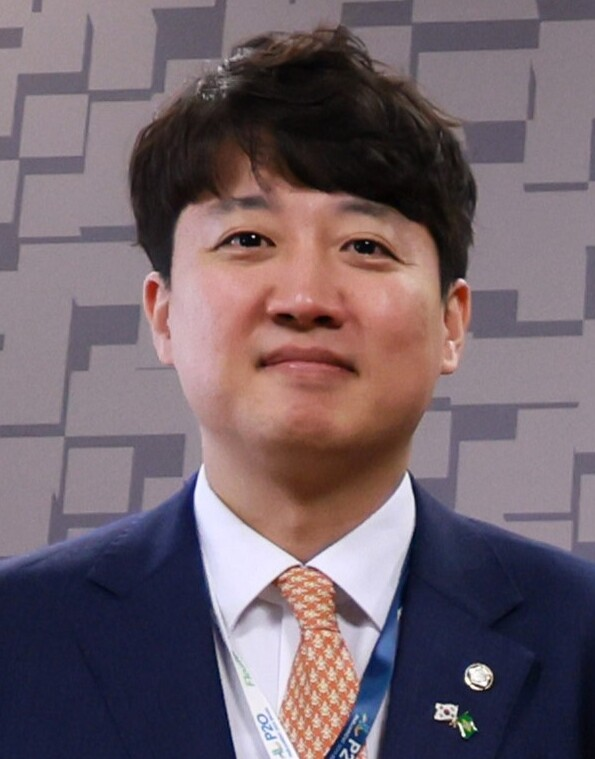
| Nominee | Lee Jae Myung | Kim Moon-soo | Lee Jun-seok |
| Party | Democratic | People Power | Reform |
| Votes | 17,287,513 | 14,395,639 | 2,917,523 |
| Percentage | 49.42% | 41.15% | 8.34% |
President before election
Lee Ju-ho (acting)
Independent
Elected President
Lee Jae Myung
Democratic

Early presidential elections were held in South Korea on 3 June 2025. Democratic Party nominee and former opposition leader Lee Jae Myung defeated the ruling People Power Party nominee Kim Moon-soo and New Reform Party nominee Lee Jun-seok.

These were the ninth presidential elections since the 1987 democratization and the establishment of the Sixth Republic, the second to be held following an impeachment, and the first to take place in a year different from the original schedule. Originally scheduled for 3 March 2027, the election was brought forward to 3 June 2025, following the impeachment and removal of Yoon Suk Yeol. An early election is required by the constitution of South Korea within 60 days of a presidential vacancy. The 2025 early election was triggered by the 4 April decision of the Constitutional Court of Korea that removed Yoon from office. Later, the government officially called an election for 3 June – the second snap presidential election in South Korean history.

Lee, who narrowly lost the 2022 presidential election to Yoon, ran again and won with a comfortable margin. Voter turnout was 79.38%, the highest since the 1997 presidential election. Campaign issues included the 2024 martial law crisis, infighting within the PPP, the economy, housing costs, political polarization, Trump tariffs, gender equality, the cost-of-living crisis, and the aging crisis.

== Background ==
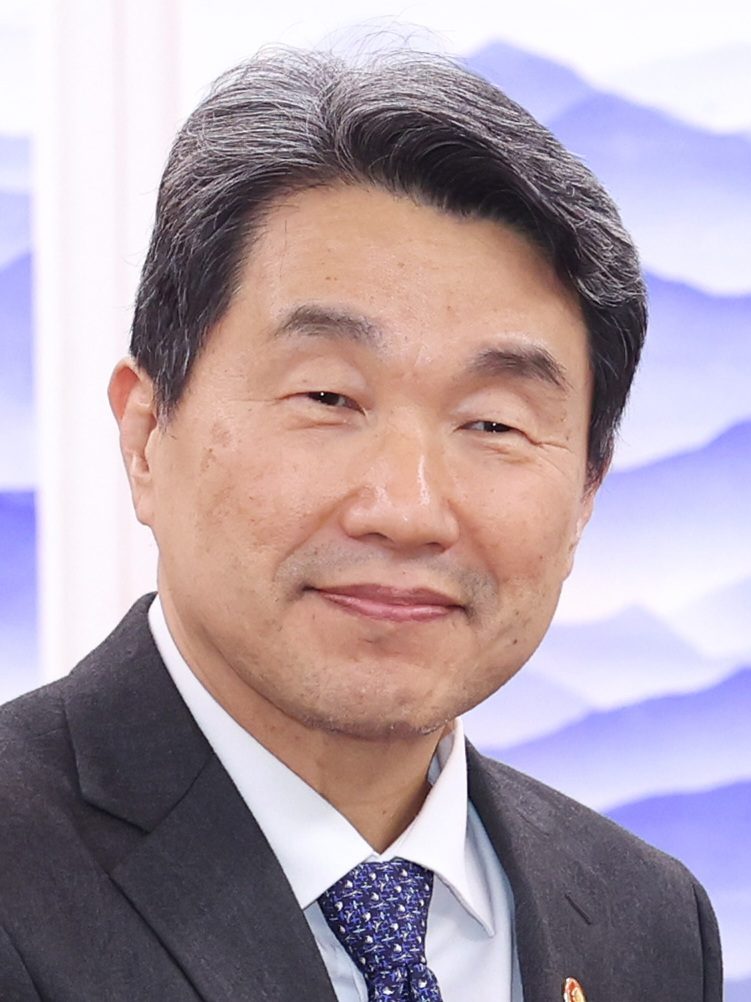
The acting incumbent in 2025, Lee Ju-ho. His term expired on June 4.

Following the martial law declaration by then-President Yoon Suk Yeol on 3 December 2024, the National Assembly voted to impeach him on 14 December 2024, with 204 lawmakers voting in favor, out of the National Assembly's total membership of 300. The Constitutional Court of Korea upheld the impeachment on 4 April 2025, removing Yoon from office.

Under the constitution, a election must be held within 60 days of the office of the President becoming vacant. On 8 April, acting President Han Duck-soo called an election for 3 June.

== Electoral system ==
The president of South Korea is elected via a single-round plurality voting system. Presidents are limited to a single five-year term, with no possibility of re-election. In regularly scheduled presidential elections, the winner takes office two months after Election Day. However, in a snap election, the winner takes office the moment the National Election Commission chair certifies the votes and strikes the gavel three times. There is no transition period.

== Nominations ==
The National Election Commission (NEC) opened preliminary candidate registration on 4 April 2025. Incumbent heads of municipal governments who chose to run for president were required to resign from their existing positions by 4 May.

=== Democratic Party ===
On 10 April, Lee Jae Myung announced his candidacy. He ran on reducing economic inequality, growing the economy through investments, and strengthening diplomatic relations with the United States and Japan. Lee also pledged to relocate the Office of the President and National Assembly to Sejong City. Lee further promised to codify Sejong City's status as South Korea's administrative capital.

On 12 April 2025, the Democratic Party of Korea announced that its presidential primary would be equally weighted between votes by dues-paying members and a public poll conducted by two polling companies that would survey one million people. The final decision would be released on 27 April, following a full party vote on 14 April and an online vote by its central committee on 15 April. This was the first DPK primary to include participants aged 16 to 18, following a 2022 revision to the Political Parties Act that lowered the minimum party membership age from 18 to 16. On 18 April, the Democratic Party held its first televised debate. On 23 April, the party held its second televised debate. During the debate, the three candidates discussed constitutional amendments to either shorten presidential terms or allow multiple terms, and when the changes would take effect. On 27 April, the party officially nominated Lee Jae Myung after a primary landslide.

==== Nominee ====
1

Democratic Party Nominee
Lee Jae Myung
for President
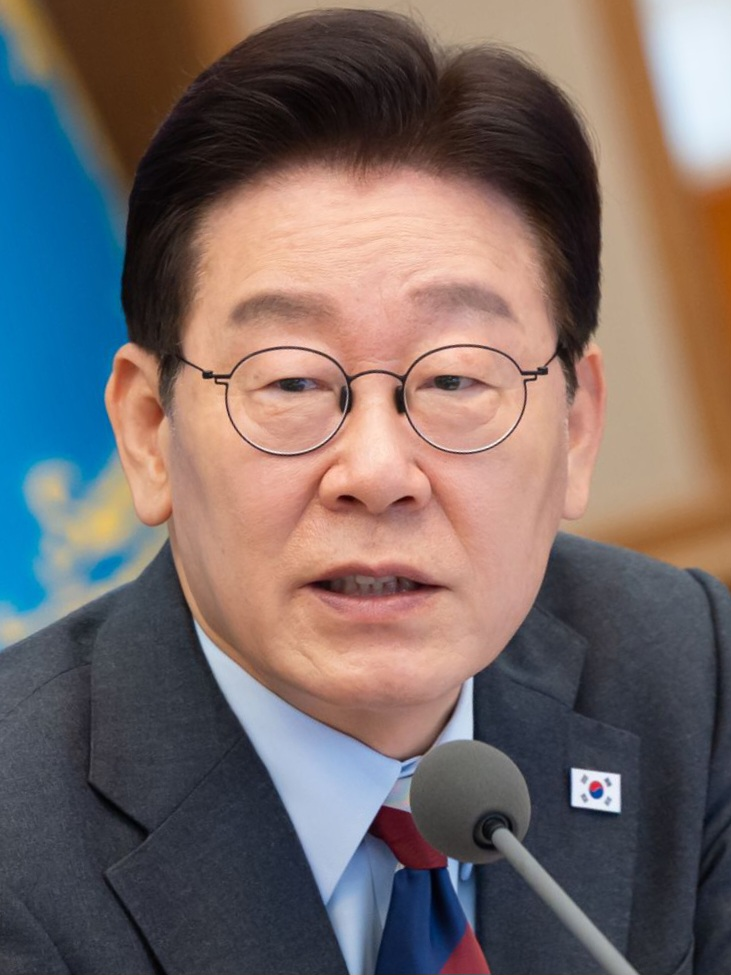
Leader of the Democratic Party
(2022–2025)

DPK leader (2022–2025) and Assemblyman Lee Jae Myung, resigned from DPK leadership on 9 April, announced his presidential bid on 10 April, and won the nomination on 27 April.

==== Withdrawn or eliminated candidates ====
Candidates in this section are sorted by date of elimination or withdrawal from the primaries
| Kim Dong-yeon | Kim Kyoung-soo | Kim Doo-kwan |
| 36th Governor of Gyeonggi Province (since 2022) | Governor of South Gyeongsang Province (2018–2021) | Member of the National Assembly (2016–2024) |
| Eliminated: 27 April; 41,307 votes | Eliminated: 27 April; 25,512 votes | Withdrew: 18 April; Did not participate in primary |

The 21st Democratic Party Presidential Primary Election on 27 April 2025
| Candidate | Results | Votes | % |
|---|---|---|---|
| Lee Jae Myung | Nominated | 623,695 | 89.77 |
| Kim Dong-yeon | Eliminated | 41,307 | 6.87 |
| Kim Kyoung-soo | Eliminated | 25,512 | 3.36 |

Kim Kyoung-soo was sentenced to prison in July 2021 and disqualified from running for public office until April 2028, but he was pardoned in August 2024, restoring his eligibility.

=== People Power Party ===
On 3 May 2025, the People Power Party (PPP) held a primary and announced the nominee at its party convention. Following three rounds of voting, former Minister of Employment and Labor Kim Moon-soo was won the party nomination. However, the PPP's leadership forced a rescission of Kim's nomination in the early hours of 10 May, citing Kim's refusal to undergo a candidate unification process with Han Duck-soo. Han was subsequently made a member of the PPP and declared as the PPP's nominee. Kim referred to the move as a midnight "coup d'état." The sudden switch faced harsh criticism from within the party, since Han had not participated in the PPP primary, leading to accusations of free-riding. A PPP membership-wide vote on approving the switch was held on 10 May from 10:00 a.m. to 9:00 p.m. KST. PPP members rejected the switch and reinstated Kim Moon-soo as the PPP's presidential candidate.

==== Nominee ====
2

People Power Party Nominee
Kim Moon-soo
for President
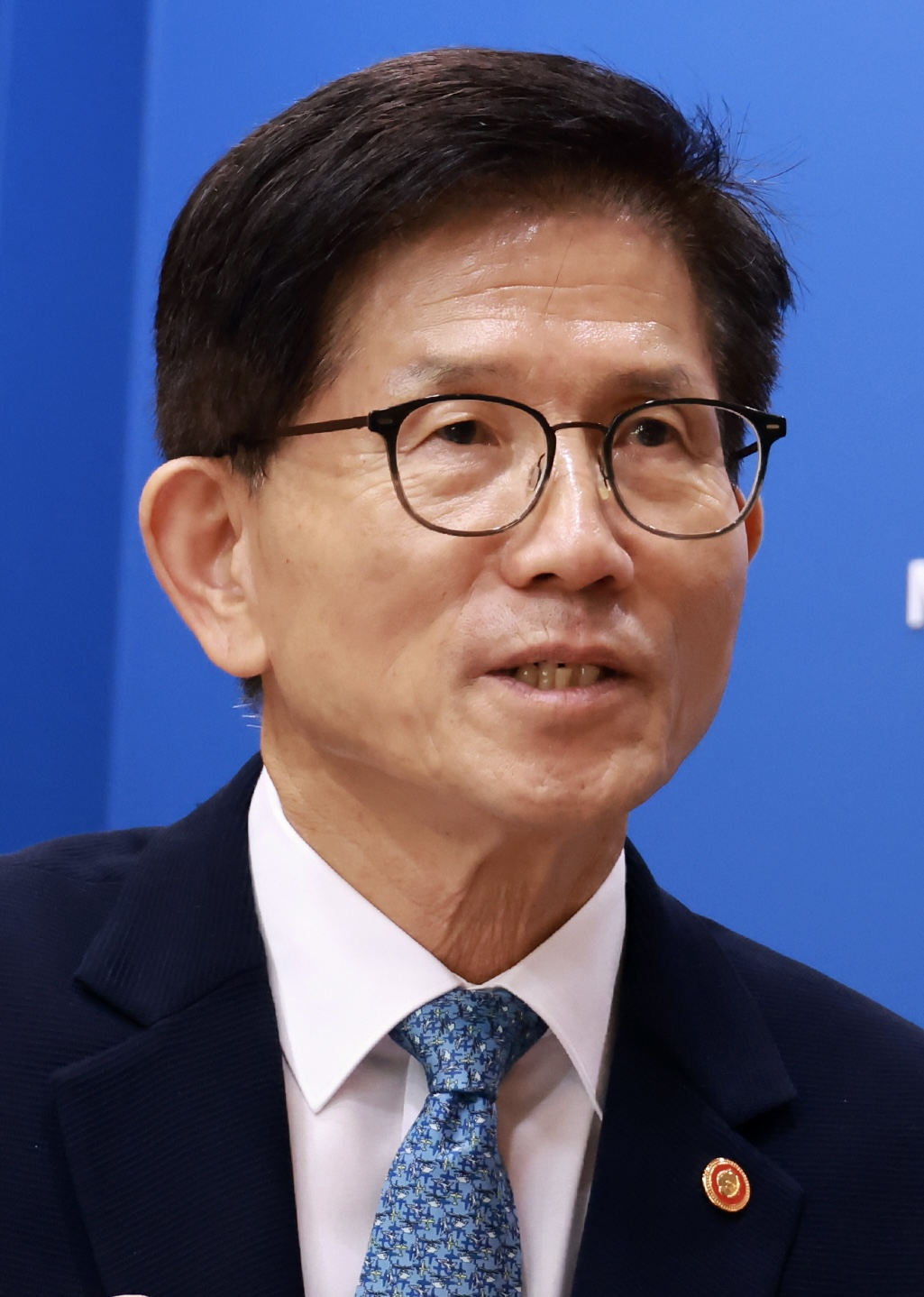
Minister of Employment
and Labor (2024–2025)

Kim Moon-soo, Minister of Employment and Labor (2024–2025) (Announced bid on 9 April, won nomination on 3 May, nomination rescinded on 10 May, nomination subsequently reinstated on 10 May)

==== Withdrawn or eliminated candidates ====
Candidates in this section are sorted by date of elimination or withdrawal from the primaries
| Han Duck-soo | Han Dong-hoon | Ahn Cheol-soo | Hong Joon-pyo | Na Kyung-won |
| Acting President of South Korea (2024; 2025) | Minister of Justice (2022–2023) | Member of the National Assembly (since 2022) | Mayor of Daegu (2022–2025) | Member of the National Assembly (since 2024) |
| Withdrew: 10 May; Nomination rescinded after Kim Moon-soo reinstated as nominee | Eliminated: 3 May; Eliminated in the final round of primary | Eliminated: 29 April; Eliminated in the second round of primary | | Eliminated: 22 April; Eliminated in the first round of primary |
| Yoo Jeong-bok | Lee Cheol-woo | Yang Hyang-ja | Yoo Seong-min | Oh Se-hoon |
| Mayor of Incheon (since 2022) | Governor of North Gyeongsang Province (since 2018) | Member of the National Assembly (2020–2024) | Member of the National Assembly (2005–2020) | Mayor of Seoul (since 2021) |
| Eliminated: 22 April; Eliminated in the first round of primary | | | Withdrew: 13 April; Did not participate in primary | Withdrew: 12 April; Did not participate in primary (endorsed Ahn Cheol-soo) |

People Power 21st Presidential Primary Election on 3 May 2025
| Candidate | Results | Votes from party members | Poll | Sum |
|---|---|---|---|---|
| Kim Moon-soo | Nominated | 246,519 (61.25%) | 208,525 (51.81%) | 455,044 (56.53%) |
| Han Dong-hoon | Eliminated | 155,961 (38.75%) | 193,955 (48.19%) | 349,916 (43.47%) |

=== Third party nominees and independent candidates ===
==== Nominees ====
| 4 | 5 | 8 |
| Reform Party Nominee | Democratic Labor Party Nominee | Independent Nominee |
| Lee Jun-seok | Kwon Yeong-guk | Song Jin-ho |
|---|---|---|
| for President | for President | for President |
| Member of the National Assembly (since 2024) | Leader of the Democratic Labor Party (since 2024) | Businessman |

==== Withdrawn, eliminated, or ineligible candidates ====
Candidates in this section are sorted by date of elimination, withdrawal, or ineligible from the primaries
| Independent | Liberty Unification Party | New Future Democratic Party |
| Hwang Kyo-ahn | Koo Joo-wa | Lee Nak-yon |
| Acting President of South Korea (2016–2017) | Lawyer | Former Prime Minister (2017–2020) |
| Withdrew: 1 June; Endorsed Kim Moon-soo | Withdrew: 19 May; Endorsed Kim Moon-soo | Withdrew: 10 May; Endorsed Kim Moon-soo |
| Progressive Party | Social Transformation Solidarity Conference (Democratic Labor Party) | Liberty Unification Party |
| Kim Jae-yeon | Han Sang-gyun | Jeon Kwang-hoon |
| Leader of the Progressive Party (since 2024) | Chairman of the Korean Confederation of Trade Unions | President of Christian Council of Korea |
| Withdrew: 9 May; Endorsed Lee Jae Myung | Eliminated: 30 April; Eliminated in the primary Endorsed Kwon Yeong-guk | Ineligible |

===== Independents =====
On 9 April 2025, former prime minister and acting president Hwang Kyo-ahn announced his presidential bid. Hwang officially registered as an independent candidate on 11 May.

On 1 May 2025, Han Duck-soo resigned as acting president and concurrent prime minister of South Korea and announced his presidential bid the next day. Han pledged to amend the constitution to allow up to two four-year terms. Han committed to resigning immediately upon a successful amendment.

Independent candidate Song Jin-ho filed his candidacy on 11 May. Song's registration documents disclosed 17 prior criminal convictions.

===== Progressive Party =====
On 19 April, the Progressive Party selected Kim Jae-yeon as its presidential candidate. She withdrew on 9 May, citing a need to primarily stop the PPP, and endorsed Lee Jae-myung.

===== Liberal Unification Party =====
After declaring his candidacy on 24 April, Jeon Kwang-hoon was found ineligible to run due to previous election law violations. Jeon's Liberal Unification Party subsequently nominated lawyer Koo Joo-wa as its presidential candidate on 9 May.

===== Rebuilding Korea Party =====
On 27 April, the Rebuilding Korea Party endorsed Lee Jae Myung of Democratic Party for the presidency.

===== New Future Democratic Party =====
Lee Nak-yon hinted at a campaign for president at the National Convention for Constitutional Revision hosted by the New Future Democratic Party. On 30 April, Lee's campaign advisor announced Lee's candidacy registration, effectively making his campaign official. However, on 10 May, Lee decided against a run, and did not endorse a candidate. On 27 May, Lee announced that he endorses Kim Moon-soo.

===== Social Transformation Solidarity Conference (Democratic Labor Party) =====
The Green Party, Justice Party, Labor Party, and several labor unions agreed to have an open primary and field candidates under the banner of Social Transformation. Kwon Yeong-guk won the primary and was nominated as the Democratic Labor Party's presidential candidate on 30 April.

Kwon pledged a complete "liquidation of insurrectionist forces" following the martial law crisis and Yoon's impeachment. He refused calls to unify his campaign with that of Lee Jae-myung, saying "independent progressive politics must continue." He promised to enact an anti-discrimination law, and would work to create an equal society without gaps. As a "street lawyer," Kwon was instrumental in the 2015 Supreme Court decision to legalize the Migrant Workers' Trade Union and promises to overhaul Korea's immigration system.

Kwon and the Democratic Labor Party qualified to appear in the televised presidential debates.

On 15 May, defeated candidate and former KCTU chairman Han Sang-gyun called for unity at a Busan press conference, saying, "This is the result of the desperation of not having a voice in an unequal world. We need to build on this power to create a decisive moment that will transform Korean society."

Social Transformation Solidarity Conference 21st Presidential Primary Election on 27–30 April 2025
| Candidate | Results | Votes | % |
|---|---|---|---|
| Kwon Yeong-guk | Nominated | 4,565 | 79.5 |
| Han Sang-gyun | Eliminated | 1,912 | 20.55 |

== Registered candidates ==
| # | Candidate | Affiliation | Background |
|---|---|---|---|
| 1 | Lee Jae Myung | Democratic | Leader of the Democratic Party (2022–2025); Member of the National Assembly (since 2022); Governor of Gyeonggi (2018–2021); 2022 Democratic Party nominee for President |
| 2 | Kim Moon-soo | People Power | Minister of Employment and Labour (2024–2025); Chairman of the Economic, Social, and Labor Council (2022–2024); Governor of Gyeonggi (2006–2014); Member of the National Assembly (1996–2006) |
| 4 | Lee Jun-seok | Reform Party | Leader of the People Power Party (2021–2022); Leader of the Reform Party (2024); Member of the National Assembly (since 2024) |
| 5 | Kwon Yeong-guk | Democratic Labor Party | Leader of the Democratic Labor Party (since 2024) |
| 6 | ~~Koo Ju-hwa~~ | ~~Liberty Unification Party~~ | ~~Lawyer~~; Dropped out and endorsed People Power Party on 19 May 2025. |
| 7 | ~~Hwang Kyo-ahn~~ | ~~Independent~~ | ~~Acting President of South Korea (2016–2017)~~; ~~Prime Minister of South Korea (2015–2017)~~; ~~Minister of Justice (2013–2015)~~; ~~Leader of the Liberty Korea Party (2019–2020)~~; ~~Leader of the United Future Party (2020)~~; Dropped out and endorsed People Power Party on 1 June 2025. |
| 8 | Song Jin-ho | Independent | Businessman |

== Campaign developments ==
Democratic Party candidate Lee Jae-myung faced legal troubles that could have barred him from being elected president. Under the Public Official Election Act, individuals fined more than 1 million won are disqualified from holding public office for five years, while those sentenced to imprisonment are disqualified for ten years. On 23 March, the Seoul High Court reversed a lower-court decision that had sentenced Lee to one year in prison with a two-year probation, restoring his eligibility. However, on 2 May, his eligibility was again called into question when the Supreme Court fast-tracked a typically months-long deliberation process, issuing a swift 10–2 decision that overturned his acquittal and remanded the case to the Seoul High Court for retrial. The retrial was initially set for 15 May but later postponed to 18 June, after Election Day.

The two leading conservative candidates Han Duck-soo and Kim Moon-soo were expected to consolidate their campaigns, with one stepping down to support the other. Han said he would not file his candidacy until a final agreement is reached with Kim on a "unified" candidate, while Kim claimed that the PPP and its chair Kwon Young-se had unilaterally moved to "unify" candidates without consulting him. Kim Jae-won, Chief of Staff for Kim Moon-soo, also stated that the party would likely move to strip Kim's nomination if he did not agree to "unify" with Han. After a Kim–Han meeting on 7 May failed to produce an agreement, PPP floor leader Kweon Seong-dong began a hunger strike to push coalescing around a single candidate.

On 8 May, Kim and Han held a televised public meeting in front of the National Assembly Proceeding Hall. They failed to reach an agreement, again. Afterward, they said a decision should be made the following day. Kim proposed a one-week campaign and survey to pick which candidate would lead a potential ticket. Kweon criticized Kim, calling him "pathetic" for wanting to remain in the race. Kim accused the PPP of trying to push him out after he was chosen as the official nominee less than a week earlier, questioning the purpose of the process. On 9 May, the Seoul Southern District Court dismissed Kim's request for an injunction, seeking to compel the PPP to recognize him as the nominee. That same day at a press conference, Kim rebuffed the idea of candidate unification, claiming he would have a better chance of winning the election if the PPP leadership did not "sabotage" him. In response, Kwon called Kim's stance disappointing and said, “A true leader must know how to let go.” Kim abruptly left in the middle of the press conference.

The PPP confirmed early on 10 May that they would outright cancel the nomination of Kim and instead nominate Han at an emergency convention the same day. Kim vowed countermeasures, criticized the breakdown of intra-party democracy, and announced that he would seek legal action against the party. Later that day, members of the PPP rejected a resolution designating Han as the party's candidate following an all-party vote, resulting in Kim's nomination being reinstated. Han issued an apology over the dispute in the PPP. On 11 May, Han officially ended his campaign, and pledged to support Kim's candidacy. He rejected an offer by Kim to serve as his campaign chair. On 17 May, Yoon Suk Yeol left the PPP and endorsed Kim Moon-soo.

On 29 May 2025, South Korean representatives of businesses with ties to the former Kaesong Industrial Complex held a press conference at the National Assembly, during which they read aloud what they claimed was a letter from American investor Jim Rogers endorsing Lee Jae-myung. However, Rogers has since denied issuing any such endorsement.

=== Debates ===
On 18 May, the first televised debate for the presidential election was held, with Kim Moon-soo, Kwon Yeong-guk, Lee Jun-seok and Lee Jae-myung in attendance. A second debate for candidates who did not qualify for the first was held on 19 May. As Koo Joo-wa dropped out that same day, the debate featured only Hwang Kyo-ahn and Song Jin-ho. A third debate on 23 May featured Lee Jae-myung, Kim Moon-soo, Lee Jun-seok and Kwon Yeong-guk.

The final televised debate of the campaign was held on 27 May, with Lee Jae-myung, Kwon Yeong-guk, Kim Moon-soo and Lee Jun-seok in attendance. During the debate, Kim said that calling Yoon Suk Yeol's martial law declaration a coup attempt before it could be ruled as such by a court was premature and misleading, leading Lee Jae-myung to criticize him for defending a "coup regime". Meanwhile, Lee Jun-seok asked Kwon Yeong-guk whether he thought sticking chopsticks in female genitalia was sexist. The following day, Lee Jun-seok apologized for using graphic profanity during the debate. On 30 May, 21 representatives from across five parties proposed expelling Lee Jun-seok from the National Assembly over his remarks, with him saying "The Democratic Party and its secondary, tertiary, and quaternary factions say they will expel me from my position as a member of parliament", whilst also saying that it's a "prelude to a dictatorship."

2025 South Korean presidential election debates
| Date and time (KST) | Host | Moderator | Participants | | | | | | Full debate |
| Key: P Participant NI Non-invitee | | | DPK | PPP | RP | DLP | Ind. | Ind. | Full debate |
| Key: P Participant NI Non-invitee | | | Lee Jae Myung | Kim Moon-soo | Lee Jun-seok | Kwon Yeong-guk | Hwang Kyo-ahn | Song Jin-ho | Full debate |
|---|---|---|---|---|---|---|---|---|---|
| 18 May 20:00 | Central Election Debate Committee | Pyeon Sang-wook (SBS) | P | P | P | P | NI | NI | Link |
| 19 May 22:00 | Central Election Debate Committee | Ko hee-Kyung (SBS) | NI | NI | NI | NI | P | P | Link |
| 23 May 20:00 | Central Election Debate Committee | Lee Yoon-hee (KBS) | P | P | P | P | NI | NI | Link |
| 27 May 20:00 | Central Election Debate Committee | Jun Jong-hwan (MBC) | P | P | P | P | NI | NI | Link |

=== Voting ===
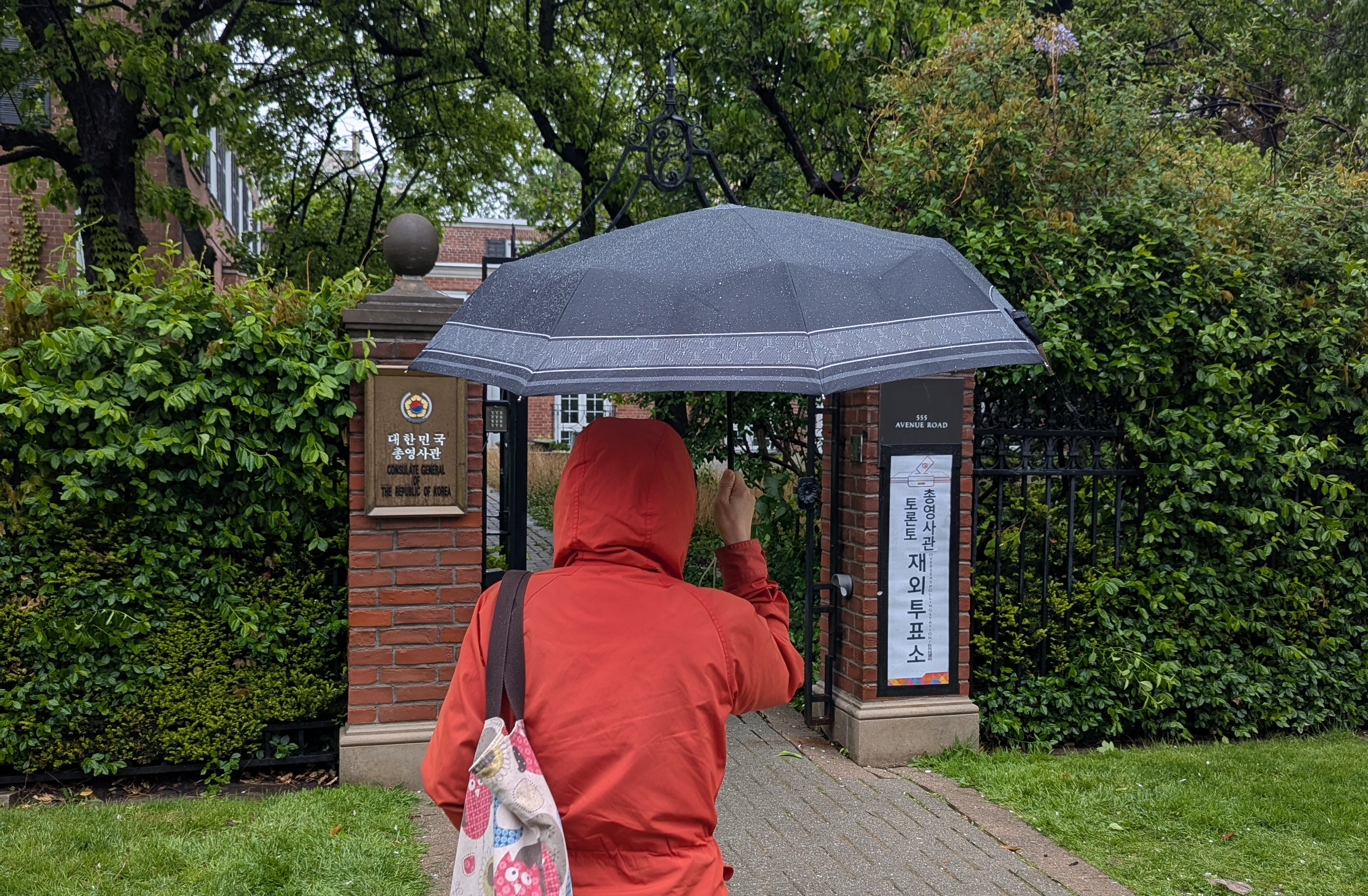
Overseas polling location in Toronto.

Overseas voting began on 19 May, with more than 258,000 South Korean nationals eligible to vote at 223 polling stations across 118 countries until 25 May. Turnout was estimated to be at 79.5%, the highest since the introduction of absentee voting in South Korea in 2012.

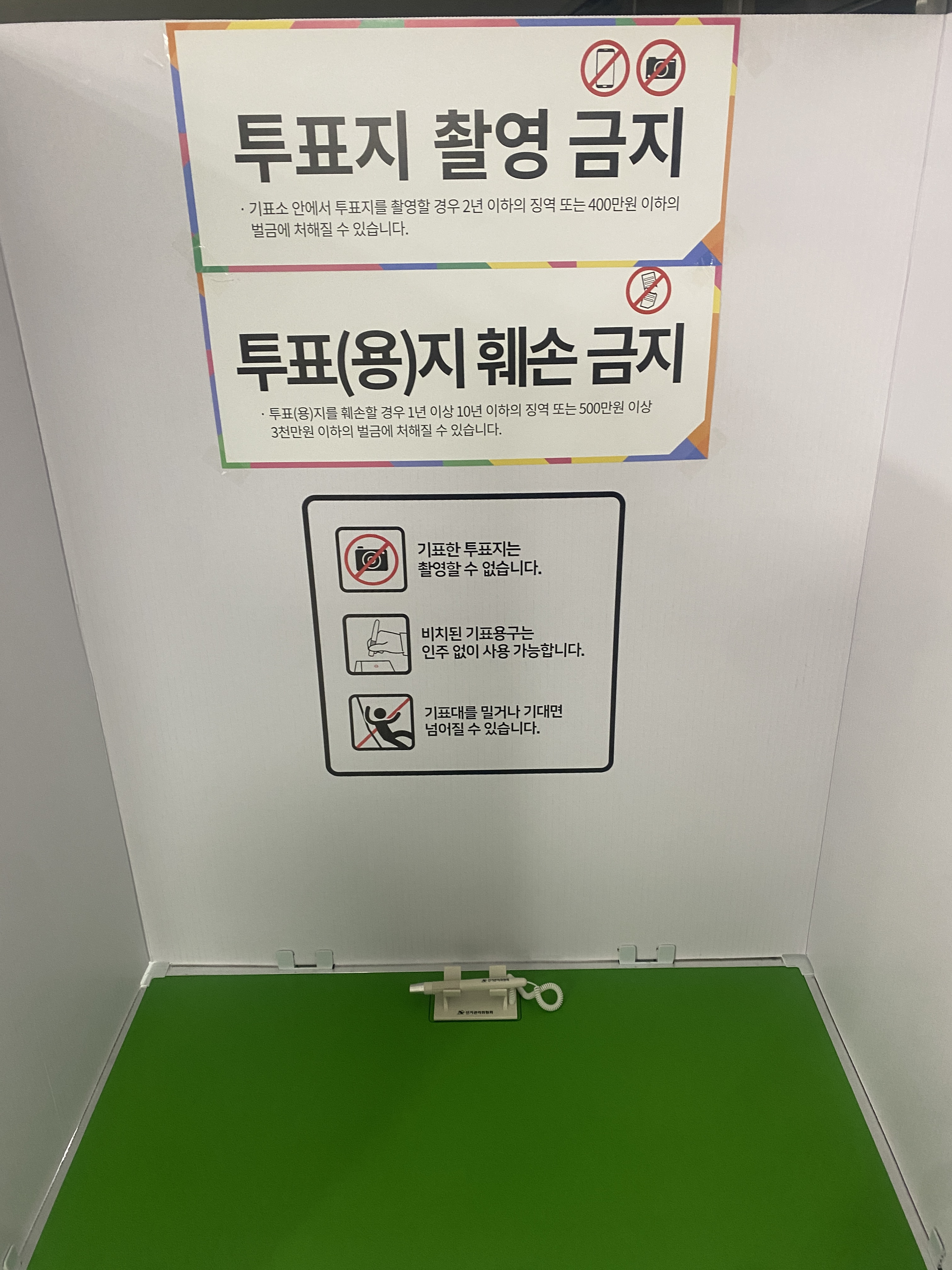
Interior of polling booth used in this election.

Early voting in South Korea was held on 29 and 30 May, with a turnout of 34.74%. On 29 May, a contract employee of the NEC was arrested in Gangnam and subsequently dismissed for casting a vote on her husband's behalf before casting another vote for herself. NEC Chair Roh Tae-ak and Secretary-General Kim Yong-bin apologized amid criticism over incidents of poor ballot management during early voting, including the double-voting incident and ballots being taken outside polling stations by voters still waiting in line. Roh also accused a civic group raising an election fraud claim of systemically interfering in the running of the vote, saying that some NEC workers sustained injuries and that a break-in occurred at the office of an election watchdog.

== Opinion polls ==
Per the Public Official Election Act, release of polling results concerning election candidates is prohibited from six days from the election day until the close of voting.

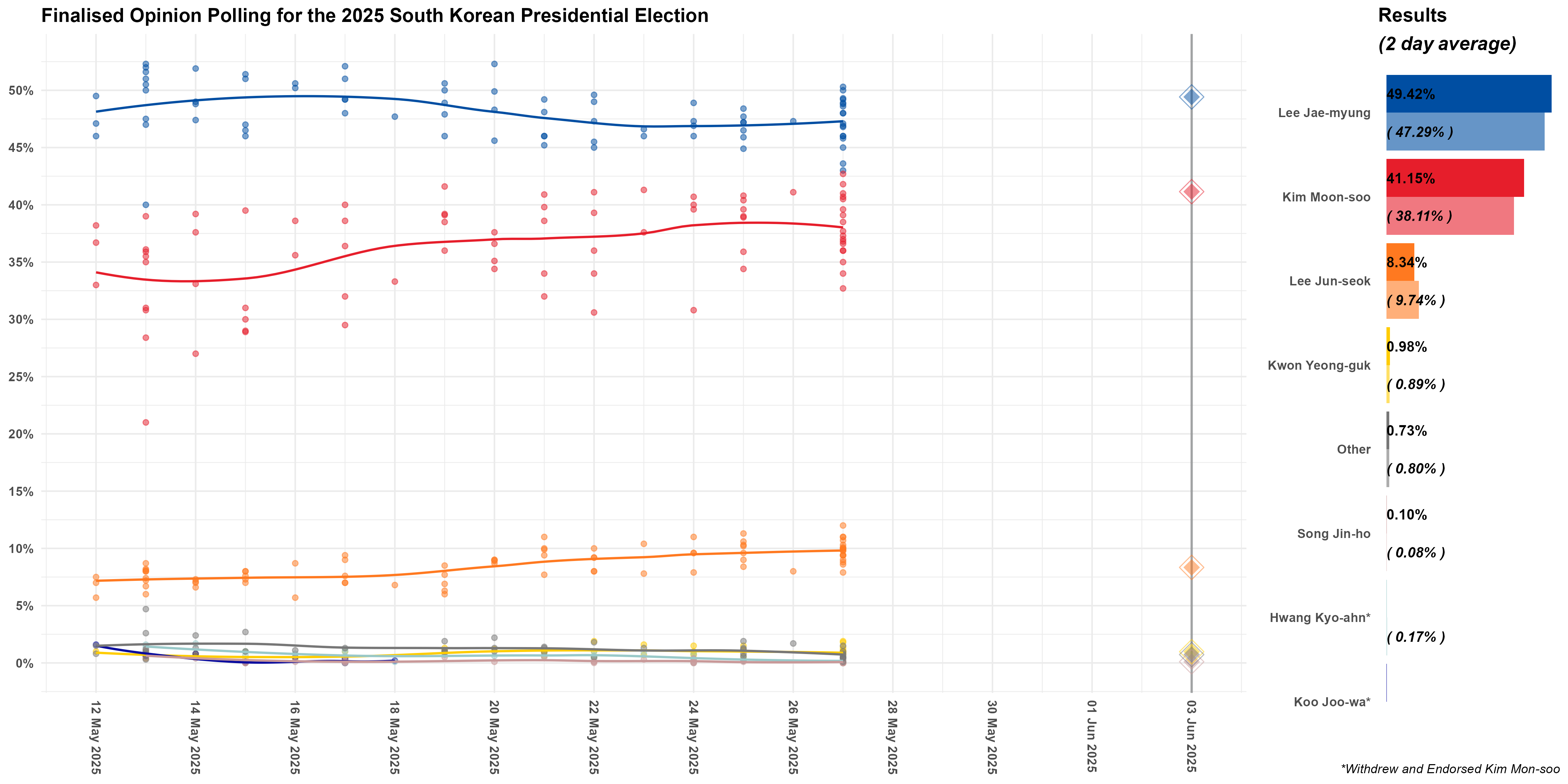
LOESS curve for the next South Korean presidential election since 12 May with a 2-day average

LOESS curve for the next South Korean presidential election before nominees were finalised with a 5-day average

=== Exit polls ===
On 3 June exit polls revealed that Lee Jae Myung received the highest number of votes at 51.7% and was therefore projected to win the election and become the next South Korean president after Yoon Suk Yeol. Kim Moon-soo received the second-highest number of votes with 39.3%, followed by Lee Jun-seok at 7.7%.

KBS, MBC, and SBS terrestrial broadcasting exit survey (margin of error: 0.8%)

| Candidate | Estimated percentage |
| Lee Jae Myung | 51.7% |
| Kim Moon-soo | 39.3% |
| Lee Jun-seok | 7.7% |
| Kwon Yeong-guk | 1.3% |
| Song Jin-ho | 0.1% |

Breakdown of KBS/MBC/SBS exit poll
| Demographic group | Lee Jae-myung | Kim Moon-soo | Lee Jun-seok |
|---|---|---|---|
| Total vote | 51.7 | 39.3 | 7.7 |
Gender
| Men | 48.3 | 39.4 | 11.1 |
| Women | 55.1 | 39.2 | 4.3 |
Age
| 18–29 years old | 41.3 | 30.9 | 24.3 |
| 30–39 years old | 47.6 | 32.7 | 17.7 |
| 40–49 years old | 72.7 | 22.2 | 4.2 |
| 50–59 years old | 69.8 | 25.9 | 3.3 |
| 60–69 years old | 48.0 | 48.9 | 2.3 |
| 70 and older | 34.0 | 64.0 | 1.5 |
Age by gender
| 18–29 years old men | 24.0 | 36.9 | 37.2 |
| 18–29 years old women | 58.1 | 25.3 | 10.3 |
| 30–39 years old men | 37.9 | 34.5 | 25.8 |
| 30–39 years old women | 57.3 | 31.2 | 9.3 |
| 40–49 years old men | 72.8 | 21.0 | 5.3 |
| 40–49 years old women | 72.6 | 23.4 | 3.0 |
| 50–59 years old men | 71.5 | 24.2 | 3.2 |
| 50–59 years old women | 68.1 | 27.6 | 3.3 |
| 60–69 years old men | 48.6 | 47.7 | 2.7 |
| 60–69 years old women | 47.5 | 50.0 | 1.9 |
| 70+ years old men | 31.3 | 65.8 | 2.1 |
| 70+ years old women | 36.2 | 62.6 | 1.0 |

KBS, MBC, and SBS terrestrial broadcasting in-depth exit survey (margin of error: 2.2%)

| Demographic group | Lee Jae-myung | Kim Moon-soo | Lee Jun-seok |
Ideology
| Conservatives | 18.0 | 74.8 | 6.8 |
| Moderates | 59.4 | 29.0 | 10.0 |
| Progressive | 87.3 | 7.7 | 2.7 |
2022 presidential vote
| Yoon Suk Yeol | 9.2 | 82.6 | 7.5 |
| Lee Jae-myung | 93.0 | 3.5 | 2.7 |

| Issues | Goal of voting | |
|---|---|---|
| Issues | To make a candidate win | To prevent opponents winning |
| Lee Jae-myung | 77.1 | 18.4 |
| Kim Moon-soo | 57.1 | 40.6 |
| Lee Jun-seok | 56.8 | 33.0 |

MBN, Channel A, and JTBC broadcasting exit survey

| Candidate | Estimated percentage | | |
| Candidate | MBN | Channel A | JTBC |
| Lee Jae-myung | 49.1% | 51.1% | 50.6% |
| Kim Moon-soo | 41.7% | 38.9% | 39.4% |
| Lee Jun-seok | 7.8% | 8.7% | 7.9% |

== Results ==

Vote share by municipalities and provinces (inset)

| Candidate | Party | Votes | % |
|---|---|---|---|
| Lee Jae Myung | Democratic Party | 17,287,513 | 49.42 |
| Kim Moon-soo | People Power Party | 14,395,639 | 41.15 |
| Lee Jun-seok | Reform Party | 2,917,523 | 8.34 |
| Kwon Yeong-guk | Democratic Labor Party | 344,150 | 0.98 |
| Song Jin-ho | Independent | 35,791 | 0.10 |
| Total | | 34,980,616 | 100.00 |
| Valid votes | | 34,980,616 | 99.27 |
| Invalid/blank votes | | 255,881 | 0.73 |
| Total votes | | 35,236,497 | 100.00 |
| Registered voters/turnout | | 44,391,871 | 79.38 |
Source: National Election Commission

=== By province and city ===
| Province/City | Lee Jae Myung | | Kim Moon-soo | | Lee Jun-seok | | Kwon Yeong-guk | | Song Jin-ho | |
| Province/City | Votes | % | Votes | % | Votes | % | Votes | % | Votes | % |
|---|---|---|---|---|---|---|---|---|---|---|
| Seoul | 3,105,459 | 47.13 | 2,738,405 | 41.56 | 655,346 | 9.95 | 83,900 | 1.27 | 5,998 | 0.09 |
| Busan | 895,213 | 40.14 | 1,146,238 | 51.40 | 168,473 | 7.55 | 18,189 | 0.82 | 2,099 | 0.09 |
| Daegu | 379,130 | 23.23 | 1,103,913 | 67.63 | 135,376 | 8.29 | 12,531 | 0.77 | 1,362 | 0.08 |
| Incheon | 1,044,295 | 51.68 | 776,952 | 38.45 | 176,739 | 8.75 | 20,743 | 1.03 | 2,098 | 0.10 |
| Gwangju | 844,682 | 84.77 | 79,937 | 8.02 | 62,104 | 6.23 | 8,767 | 0.88 | 934 | 0.09 |
| Daejeon | 470,321 | 48.51 | 393,549 | 40.59 | 94,724 | 9.77 | 9,905 | 1.02 | 1,109 | 0.11 |
| Ulsan | 315,820 | 42.54 | 353,180 | 47.57 | 63,177 | 8.51 | 9,299 | 1.25 | 899 | 0.12 |
| Sejong | 140,620 | 55.63 | 83,965 | 33.22 | 25,004 | 9.89 | 2,961 | 1.17 | 235 | 0.09 |
| Gyeonggi | 4,821,148 | 52.21 | 3,504,620 | 37.95 | 816,435 | 8.84 | 84,074 | 0.91 | 8,356 | 0.09 |
| Gangwon | 449,161 | 43.96 | 483,360 | 47.31 | 78,704 | 7.70 | 9,422 | 0.92 | 1,137 | 0.11 |
| North Chungcheong | 501,990 | 47.47 | 457,065 | 43.22 | 86,984 | 8.23 | 10,169 | 0.96 | 1,228 | 0.12 |
| South Chungcheong | 661,316 | 47.68 | 600,108 | 43.27 | 111,092 | 8.01 | 12,893 | 0.93 | 1,519 | 0.11 |
| North Jeolla | 1,023,272 | 82.65 | 134,996 | 10.90 | 67,961 | 5.49 | 10,061 | 0.81 | 1,719 | 0.14 |
| South Jeolla | 1,111,941 | 85.87 | 110,624 | 8.54 | 60,822 | 4.70 | 9,352 | 0.72 | 2,104 | 0.16 |
| North Gyeongsang | 442,683 | 25.53 | 1,159,594 | 66.87 | 116,094 | 6.69 | 13,884 | 0.80 | 1,788 | 0.10 |
| South Gyeongsang | 851,733 | 39.40 | 1,123,843 | 51.99 | 161,579 | 7.47 | 21,809 | 1.01 | 2,678 | 0.12 |
| Jeju | 228,729 | 54.77 | 145,290 | 34.79 | 36,909 | 8.84 | 6,191 | 1.48 | 528 | 0.13 |
| Total | 17,287,513 | 49.42 | 14,395,639 | 41.15 | 2,917,523 | 8.34 | 344,150 | 0.98 | 35,791 | 0.10 |
Source: National Election Commission

== Aftermath ==
DPK candidate Lee Jae Myung delivered a victory speech upon confirmation of his election, stating that the victory belonged to the people and thanking voters for demonstrating their democratic will during a time of political uncertainty. He emphasized, "This is a victory for the people and a victory for democracy", and pledged to faithfully fulfill the responsibilities entrusted to him. Lee expressed his commitment to building "a nation for ordinary citizens" and affirmed that presidential power must be exercised not for personal gain but solely for the welfare of the people and the future of the country.

Following his inauguration, Lee Jae Myung delivered a statement titled "Message to the People after the Oath of Office" on 4 June 2025. He pledged to become "a president for everyone, embracing and serving all citizens regardless of whom they supported", and vowed to restore dialogue, compromise, and a politics of coexistence and national unity.

PPP candidate Kim Moon-soo delivered a concession speech in the early hours of 4 June 2025, stating that he "humbly accepts the choice of the people" and congratulated Lee Jae Myung on his victory. He expressed gratitude for the public's support throughout the campaign and thanked party members for their dedication and efforts. Kim emphasized that the Republic of Korea has always advanced through the power of its people, regardless of crisis, and conveyed appreciation for the democratic will shown by voters during a politically turbulent time.

Kim's defeat triggered immediate calls for reform within the PPP. Former party leader Han Dong-hoon argued that voters had issued "a firm order of expulsion against illegal martial law and the outdated politics that defended it". Assemblywoman Han Ji-ah demanded that the entire leadership step down “without delay" to rebuild public trust. Floor leader Kweon Seong-dong countered that the party must first "restore a sense of community and end internal strife" to confront the now-governing Democratic Party. On 5 June, PPP floor leader Kweon Seong-dong resigned to take responsibility for the election result.

Lee Jun-seok, who had pledged to surpass the 10% and even 15% threshold in order to secure public election subsidies, took responsibility for the Reform Party's underperformance in the election. He expressed his gratitude to every party member and supporter, stating that the Reform New Party had now gained experience through both legislative and presidential elections. He emphasized the need for a thorough review of the party's strengths and weaknesses and set the goal of achieving further progress in the upcoming local elections one year from now. He also expressed respect for President-Elect Lee Jae Myung and called on the new government to prioritize national unity and respond to the current economic challenges with precision and careful judgment. Lee reaffirmed that the Reform Party would continue to serve as a constructive opposition party and maintain its role in holding the administration accountable.

In a statement to Yonhap News Agency after the election, an unnamed White House official wrote "While South Korea had a free and fair election, the United States remains concerned and opposed to Chinese interference and influence in democracies around the world."
