= Labor Politics Solidarity =

Political organisation in South Korea

- Leader: Yang Gyeong-gyu
- Founded: 8 November 2013
- Dissolved: 15 November 2015
- Split from: Unified Progressive Party
- Merged into: Justice Party
- Ideology: Social democracy
- Political position: Centre-left
- Colors: Red

Korean name
- Hangul: 노동정치연대
- RR: Nodong jeongchi yeondae
- MR: Nodong chŏngch'i yŏndae

The Labor Politics Solidarity was a political organisation in South Korea formed around the goal of creating a labor-centered, progressive political party. It was dissolved in 2015, two years after its creation.

== History ==
In December 2012, seven organisations affiliated with the Korean Confederation of Trade Unions (KCTU) that opposed the Unified Progressive Party's rigged primary election scandal formed the Labor Politics Solidarity with the aim to establish a new labor party. In November 2013 the Labor Politics Solidarity was officially launched. In November 2015 Labor Politics Solidarity, together with Progressive Gathering+ and National Gathering, merged into the Justice Party.

== See also ==
- Progressive Gathering+
- Justice Party
- Unified Progressive Party
