= South Korean proportional constituency =

Proportional representation
- Proportional representation constituency for the National Assembly
- District(s): South Korea
- Region: Nationwide

Current constituency
- Created: 1963 (first); 2004 (current system)
- Seats: 56 (2004–2008); 54 (2008–2016); 47 (2016–2024); 46 (2024–present)
- Member(s): Liberty Korea (17); Bareunmirae (13); Democratic (13); Justice (4)

Proportional representation (Korean: 비례대표) is a proportional representation constituency of the National Assembly of South Korea. The constituency consists of South Korea (nationwide).

It is a party-list proportional representation, adopt a closed list system.

== History ==
The nationwide proportional representation system was introduced for the first time in the 1963 election. The system at that time was to allocate proportional representation seats according to the percentage of votes won by each party in the single-member constituency.

However, on 19 July 2001, the Constitutional Court ruled the system unconstitutional that it is against the principle of democracy to regard support for a candidate of single-member constituency as support for the party to which the candidate belongs.

Thus, the Public Election Act was revised to separate single-member constituency and proportional representation votes and applied from the 2004 election.

In addition, half of seats of the proportional representation was allocated to the first party until the 1988 election, but it was abolished in 1990.

== Members of the National Assembly ==
Members for Proportional representation (2004–present)
Election	Distribution
2004	DLP / Uri / MDP / GNP; 8 / 23 / 4 / 21
2008	DLP / DP / CKP / LFP / GNP / Pro-Park; 3 / 15 / 2 / 4 / 22 / 8
2012	UPP / DUP / LFP / Saenuri; 6 / 21 / 2 / 25
2016	JP / DP / PP / Saenuri; 4 / 13 / 13 / 17

== Election results ==
=== Summary ===
Summary of Proportional representation results (2004–present)
Election	1st party		2nd party		3rd party		4th party		5th party		6th party		Source
2004	Uri		Grand National		Democratic Labor		Millennium Democratic		None		None		
2004	Votes	8,145,814	Votes	7,613,660	Votes	2,774,061	Votes	1,510,178	None		None		
2004	%	38.3%	%	35.8%	%	13.0%	%	7.1%	None		None		
2004	Seats	23	Seats	21	Seats	8	Seats	4	None		None		
2008	Grand National		Democratic		Pro-Park		Liberty Forward		Democratic Labor		Creative Korea		
2008	Votes	6,421,727	Votes	4,313,645	Votes	2,258,750	Votes	1,173,463	Votes	973,445	Votes	651,993	
2008	%	37.5%	%	25.2%	%	13.2%	%	6.8%	%	5.7%	%	3.8%	
2008	Seats	22	Seats	15	Seats	8	Seats	4	Seats	3	Seats	2	
2012	Saenuri		Democratic United		Unified Progressive		Liberty Forward		None		None		
2012	Votes	9,130,651	Votes	7,777,123	Votes	2,198,405	Votes	690,754	None		None		
2012	%	42.8%	%	36.5%	%	10.3%	%	3.2%	None		None		
2012	Seats	25	Seats	21	Seats	6	Seats	2	None		None		
2016	Saenuri		People's		Democratic		Justice		None		None		
2016	Votes	7,960,272	Votes	6,355,572	Votes	6,069,744	Votes	1,719,891	None		None		
2016	%	33.5%	%	26.7%	%	25.5%	%	7.2%	None		None		
2016	Seats	17	Seats	13	Seats	13	Seats	4	None		None		

=== 2016 ===
Note
#: List rank assigned by the party

Proportional representation results in the 2016 South Korean legislative election
#	Candidate	Status	#	Candidate	Status	#	Candidate	Status	#	Candidate	Status
Saenuri: 7,960,272 votes (33.5%), 17 seats			PP: 6,355,572 votes (26.7%), 13 seats			DP: 6,069,744 votes (25.5%), 13 seats			JP: 1,719,891 votes (7.2%), 4 seats		
1	Song Hee-kyoung	Elected	1	Shin Yong-hyeon	Elected	1	Park Kyung-mee	Elected	1	Lee Jeong-mi	Elected
2	Lee Jong-myeong	Elected	2	Oh Se-jung	Elected	2	Kim Chong-in	Elected	2	Kim Jong-dae	Elected
3	Lim Lee-ja	Elected	3	Park Joo-hyun	Elected	3	Song Ok-joo	Elected	3	Chu Hye-seon	Elected
4	Moon Jin-kook	Elected	4	Lee Sang-don	Elected	4	Choi Woon-youl	Elected	4	Youn So-ha	Elected
5	Choi Yeon-hye	Elected	5	Park Sun-sook	Elected	5	Lee Jae-jung	Elected	5	Kim Myung-mi	–
6	Kim Gyu-hwan	Elected	6	Chae Yi-bai	Elected	6	Kim Hyun-kwon	Elected	6	Cho Sung-ju	–
7	Shin Bo-ra	Elected	7	Kim Su-min	Elected	7	Moon Mi-ok	Elected	7	Lee Hyun-jung	–
8	Kim Seang-tae	Elected	8	Lee Tae-kyu	Elected	8	Rhee Cheol-hee	Elected	8	Lee Young-seok	–
9	Jun Hee-kyung	Elected	9	Kim Sam-hwa	Elected	9	Je Youn-kyung	Elected	9	Jeong Ho-jin	–
10	Kim Jong-seok	Elected	10	Kim Joong-ro	Elected	10	Kim Sung-soo	Elected	10	Yang Kyung-gyu	–
11	Kim Seung-hee	Elected	11	Chang Jung-sook	Elected	11	Kwon Mi-hyuk	Elected	11	Oh Hyun-sook	–
12	You Min-bong	Elected	12	Lee Dong-sup	Elected	12	Lee Yong-deuk	Elected	12	Kang Deu-rim	–
13	Yoon Jong-pil	Elected	13	Choi Do-ja	Elected	13	Jung Choun-sook	Elected	13	Lee Hye-won	–
14	Cho Hun-hyun	Elected	14	Lim Jae-hun	–	14	Shim Ki-joon	–	14	Hong Bu-ki	–
15	Kim Soon-rye	Elected	15	Kim Im-yeon	–	15	Lee Soo-hyuck	–	Minjoo: 209,872 votes (0.9%), no seat		
16	Khang Hyo-shang	Elected	16	Jeong Joong-gyu	–	16	Jeong Eun-hye	–	1	Kang Shin-sung	–
17	Kim Hyun-ah	Elected	17	Lee Mi-hyun	–	17	Heo Yoon-jung	–	2	Kim Min-seok	–
18	Kim Cheol-soo	–	18	Kim Hyun-ok	–	18	Lee Tae-soo	–	3	Ahn Sun-mi	–
19	Cho Myung-hee	–	CLP: 626,853 votes (2.6%), no seat			19	Yang Jung-sook	–	4	Park Yong-kyu	–
20	Kim Bon-soo	–	1	Lee Yoon-seok	–	20	Ryu Young-jin	–	HRPP: 25,227 votes (0.1%), no seat		
21	Ha Yoon-hee	–	2	Kim Jeong-gook	–	21	Lee Su-jin	–	1	Choi Yong-sang	–
22	Shin Won-shik	–	3	Kim Ji-yeon	–	22	Kwon Hyuk-gi	–	WEW: 12,143 votes (0.1%), no seat		
23	Kim Jeong-ju	–	4	Koh Young-il	–	23	Park Ki-young	–	1	Hwang Jeong-ae	–
24	Lim Myung-bae	–	5	Kim Yang-won	–	24	Chang Kyoung-tae	–	GPK: 182,301 votes (0.8%), no seat		
25	Min Kyung-won	–	6	Hong Ho-soo	–	25	Yang Seung-sook	–	1	Hwang Yoon	–
26	Kim Kyu-min	–	7	Choi Gwi-soo	–	26	Lee Sang-heon	–	2	Lee Gye-sam	–
27	Kim Se-won	–	8	Noh Tae-jeong	–	27	Choi Kyung-sook	–	3	Kim Joo-on	–
28	Song Ki-soon	–	9	Lee Tae-hee	–	28	Kim Jae-jong	–	4	Koo Ja-sang	–
29	Bang Kyoung-yeon	–	10	Cho Myung-jae	–	29	Kang Sun-woo	–	5	Sin Jie-ye	–
30	Lee Young	–	Let's go Korea: 27,103 votes (0.1%), no seat			30	Kim Young-woong	–	PUP: 145,624 votes (0.6%), no seat		
31	Choi Won-ju	–	1	Ryu Seung-goo	–	31	Park Ok-sun	–	1	Jeong Soo-yeon	–
32	Park Hyun-seok	–	2	Kim Sang-woo	–	32	Kim Jae-soo	–	2	Lee Dae-jong	–
33	Shin Hyang-sook	–	PNPR: 11,981 votes (0.1%), no seat			33	Nam Young-hee	–	3	Jeon Jong-deok	–
34	Woo Shin-goo	–	1	Park Se-joon	–	34	Lee Soon-young	–	4	Lee Sung-il	–
35	Lee Seung-jin	–	RP: 12,295 votes (0.1%), no seat			LP: 91,705 votes (0.4%), no seat			Hannara: 86,464 votes (0.4%), no seat		
36	Lee Bu-hyoung	–	1	Park Geun-ryeong	–	1	Yong Hye-in	–	1	Kwon Soon-deok	–
37	Lee Haeng-sook	–	CP: 12,295 votes (0.1%), no seat			2	Koo Kyo-hyun	–	2	Kim Yong-gyun	–
38	Kim Ki-woong	–	1	Choi Young-soon	–	UKP: 16,427 votes (0.1%), no seat			WNP: 20,267 votes (0.1%), no seat		
39	Han Jung-hye	–	2	Choi Chang-young	–	1	Yoo Gyu-jong	–	1	Ahn Jin-sook	–
40	Han Jeong-hyo	–	3	Lee Jae-sung	–	2	Jang Deok-hwan	–	2	Lee Sang-goo	–
41	Cho Tae-im	–	KNP: 16,407 votes (0.1%), no seat			3	Shin Jae-hoon	–			
42	Kim Jong-hoon	–	1	Kim Man-geun	–	4	Kim Joo-hee	–			
43	Seo Ahn-soon	–									
44	Lee In-sil	–									

=== 2012 ===
Note
#: List rank assigned by the party

Proportional representation results in the 2012 South Korean legislative election
#	Candidate	Status	#	Candidate	Status	#	Candidate	Status	#	Candidate	Status
Saenuri: 9,130,651 votes (42.8%), 25 seats			DUP: 7,777,123 votes (36.5%), 21 seats			UPP: 2,198,405 votes (10.3%), 6 seats			LFP: 690,754 votes (3.2%), 2 seats		
1	Min Byung-joo	Elected	1	Jeon Soon-ok	Elected	1	Yoon Geum-soon	Elected	1	Moon Jung-rim	Elected
2	Kim Jung-rok	Elected	2	Choi Dong-ik	Elected	2	Lee Seok-ki	Elected	2	Kim Young-ju	Elected
3	Yoon Myung-hee	Elected	3	Eun Su-mi	Elected	3	Kim Jae-yeon	Elected	3	Hwang In-ja	–
4	Cho Myeong-cheol	Elected	4	Hong Jong-hak	Elected	4	Jeong Jin-hu	Elected	4	Byeon Woong-jeon	–
5	Kang Eun-hee	Elected	5	Jin Sun-mee	Elected	5	Kim Je-nam	Elected	5	Song Ah-young	–
6	Joo Young-soon	Elected	6	Kim Yong-ik	Elected	6	Park Won-seok	Elected	6	Kang Chang-kyu	–
7	Shin Eui-jin	Elected	7	Bae Jae-jung	Elected	7	Cho Yoon-sook	–	7	Jeong Young-soon	–
8	Lee Sang-il	Elected	8	Baek Goon-gi	Elected	8	Lee Young-hee	–	8	Ahn Dae-ryun	–
9	Lee Ailesa	Elected	9	Nam In-soon	Elected	9	Oh Ok-man	–	9	Lee Myung-sook	–
10	Lee Man-woo	Elected	10	Kim Kwang-jin	Elected	10	Noh Hang-rae	–	10	Choi Hong-mook	–
11	Park Geun-hye	Elected	11	Han Jeoung-ae	Elected	11	Na Soon-ja	–	11	Ham Young-yi	–
12	Ahn Jong-beom	Elected	12	Kim Ki-joon	Elected	12	Rhyu Si-min	–	12	Jang Dong-hak	–
13	Kim Hyun-sook	Elected	13	Jang Ha-na	Elected	13	Yoon Nan-shil	–	13	Shin Myung-gon	–
14	Kim Jang-sil	Elected	14	Kim Ki-sik	Elected	14	Seo Gi-ho	–	14	Park Young-hwan	–
15	Jasmine B. Lee	Elected	15	Han Myeong-sook	Elected	15	Hwang Sun	–	15	Seo Kyu-seok	–
16	Choi Bong-hong	Elected	16	Do Jong-hwan	Elected	16	Moon Kyoung-shik	–	16	Park Dae-sung	–
17	Ryu Ji-young	Elected	17	Kim Hyun	Elected	17	Park Young-hee	–	NPP: 243,065 votes (1.1%), no seat		
18	Song Young-geun	Elected	18	Jin Sung-joon	Elected	18	Kang Jong-heon	–	1	Kim Soon-ja	–
19	Min Hyun-ju	Elected	19	Choi Min-hee	Elected	19	Kim Su-jin	–	2	Hong Se-hwa	–
20	Park Chang-sik	Elected	20	Hong Eui-rak	Elected	20	Yoon Gap In-je	–	3	Lee Myung-hee	–
21	Son In-chun	Elected	21	Lim Su-kyung	Elected	CLDP: 257,190 votes (1.2%), no seat			4	Jeong Jin-woo	–
22	Kim Sang-min	Elected	22	Shin Moon-sik	–	1	Kim Choong-rip	–	5	Chang Hye-ok	–
23	Hyun Young-hee	Elected	23	Moon Myung-soon	–	2	Yoo Choong-jin	–	6	Vladimir M. Tikhonov	–
24	Lee Jae-young	Elected	24	Kim Heon-tae	–	3	Lee Sang-soon	–	7	Park Eun-ji	–
25	Shin Kyung-rim	Elected	25	Cho Kyung-ae	–	4	Lee Tae-ho	–	Hannara: 181,822 votes (0.9%), no seat		
26	Lee Woon-ryong	–	26	Kim Jwa-gwan	–	5	Nam Sang-hoon	–	1	Lee Tae-hee	–
27	Park Yoon-ok	–	27	Jeong Eun-hye	–	6	Kwon Young-shik	–	KP: 156,241 votes (0.7%), no seat		
28	Yang Chang-young	–	28	Ahn Sang-hyun	–	7	Koh Young-seok	–	1	Jeon Yeo-ok	–
29	Jang Jung-eun	–	29	Kim Kyung-ja	–	8	Choi Sook-ja	–	2	Kim Seung-je	–
30	Lee Dong-ju	–	30	Lee Jae-hwa	–	PPC: 134,898 votes (0.6%), no seat			3	Park Jae-sook	–
31	Jeong Yoon-sook	–	31	Song Ok-joo	–	1	Kim Ki-mok	–	4	Lee Myung-woo	–
32	Lee Won-ki	–	32	Kim Young-sul	–	2	Jeon Yu-ri	–	5	Lee Yong-hwan	–
33	Seo Mi-kyung	–	33	Jeong Ji-young	–	3	Yoon Young-hee	–	6	Eom Hyang-hee	–
34	Jeong Byung-gook	–	34	Jeong Sung-pyo	–	4	Kim Jong-ho	–	7	Hong Jae-beom	–
35	Han Jeong-hye	–	35	Kim Jae-soo	–	GPK: 103,842 votes (0.5%), no seat			CKP: 91,935 votes (0.4%), no seat		
36	Kim In-kyum	–	36	Yoo Sung-hoon	–	1	Lee Yoo-jin	–	1	Yoon Ji-young	–
37	Jeong Soo-kyoung	–	37	Kwon Hyuk-gi	–	2	Yoo Young-hoon	–	2	Kong Sung-kyung	–
38	Yoon Ki-sung	–	38	Seo Jeong-do	–	3	Chang Jung-hwa	–	3	Jeong Chang-deok	–
39	Choi Yu-su	–	RDP: 48,648 votes (0.2%), no seat			GNCP: 60,428 votes (0.3%), no seat			4	Lee Ji-young	–
40	Park Ju-woong	–	1	Jang Gi-pyo	–	1	Koo Cheon-seo	–	YP: 73,194 votes (0.3%), no seat		
41	Shin Hyang-sook	–	2	Yoo Sang-doo	–	2	Yoon Young-oh	–	1	Kang Yeon-jae	–
42	Lee Min-soo	–	3	Lee Hee-ja	–	3	Han Kwan-hee	–	2	Oh Tae-yang	–
43	Kim Oi-cheol	–	4	Choi Mi-ran	–	4	Lee Gil-yong	–	3	Kang Joo-hee	–
44	Paik Ki-youp	–	5	Lim Kyu-oh	–	5	Park Joon-hyung	–	4	Woo In-cheol	–
KCP: 54,332 votes (0.3%), no seat			6	Lee Yoo-won	–	6	Hwang Seok-hee	–			
1	Jeong Hoon	–	7	Lee Mi-kyung	–	7	Lee Sun-woo	–			
2	Jeon Young-chun	–									

=== 2008 ===
Note
#: List rank assigned by the party

Proportional representation results in the 2008 South Korean legislative election
#	Candidate	Status	#	Candidate	Status	#	Candidate	Status	#	Candidate	Status
GNP: 6,421,727 votes (37.5%), 22 seats			DP: 4,313,645 votes (25.2%), 15 seats			Pro-Park: 2,258,750 votes (13.2%), 8 seats			LFP: 1,173,463 votes (6.8%), 4 seats		
1	Kang Myung-soon	Elected	1	Lee Sung-nam	Elected	1	Yang Jung-rye	Elected	1	Lee Young-ae	Elected
2	Lim Doo-sung	Elected	2	Park Eun-soo	Elected	2	Suh Chung-won	Elected	2	Cho Soon-hyung	Elected
3	Bae Eun-hee	Elected	3	Choi Young-hee	Elected	3	Kim Noh-sik	Elected	3	Park Sun-young	Elected
4	Kang Sung-cheon	Elected	4	Song Min-soon	Elected	4	Song Young-sun	Elected	4	Kim Yong-goo	Elected
5	Lee Jung-sun	Elected	5	Jeon Hye-sook	Elected	5	Kim Eul-dong	Elected	5	Park Won-kyung	–
6	Kim Jang-soo	Elected	6	Chung Kook-gyo	Elected	6	Jeong Ha-gyun	Elected	6	Kim Young-ju	–
7	Kim So-nam	Elected	7	Jeon Hyun-hee	Elected	7	Jeong Young-hee	Elected	7	Son Won-kyo	–
8	Chung Jin-suk	Elected	8	Seo Jong-pyo	Elected	8	Roh Chul-rae	Elected	8	Lee Heung-ju	–
9	Lee Eun-jae	Elected	9	Shin Nak-kyun	Elected	9	Kim Hye-seong	–	9	Hwang In-ja	–
10	Lee Dal-gon	Elected	10	Choi Moon-soon	Elected	10	Yoon Sang-il	–	10	Lee Yong-jae	–
11	Kim Geum-rae	Elected	11	Kim Sang-hee	Elected	11	Kim Jeong	–	11	Lee Hye-yeon	–
12	Na Sung-lin	Elected	12	Kim Choong-jo	Elected	13	Lee Hee-ja	–	12	Heo Sung-woo	–
13	Cho Yoon-sun	Elected	13	Park Sun-sook	Elected	14	Cho Wook-youn	–	13	Lee Myung-sook	–
14	Cho Moon-hwan	Elected	14	Ahn Gyu-baek	Elected	15	Seok Jong-hyun	–	14	Shin Deok-hyun	–
15	Son Sook-mi	Elected	15	Kim Yoo-jung	Elected	DLP: 973,445 votes (5.7%), 3 seats			15	Kang Yoon-hee	–
16	Won Hee-mok	Elected	16	Park Hong-soo	–	1	Kwak Jung-sook	Elected	16	Lee Wook-yeol	–
17	Lee Ae-ju	Elected	17	Kim Jin-ae	–	2	Hong Hee-deok	Elected	17	Shin Dong-eui	–
18	Lee Chun-shik	Elected	18	Kim Hak-jae	–	3	Lee Jung-hee	Elected	18	Chung Hae-eun	–
19	Chung Ok-nim	Elected	19	Yoo Eun-hae	–	4	Ji Geum-jong	–	19	Lee Kyoung-woo	–
20	Lim Dong-kyu	Elected	20	Shin Moon-sik	–	5	Lee Joo-hee	–	20	Park Seung-gook	–
21	Kim Ok-yi	Elected	21	Han Myung-hee	–	6	Moon Kyoung-shik	–	CKP: 651,993 votes (3.8%), 2 seats		
22	Lee Jung-hyun	Elected	22	Nam Ki-chang	–	7	Choi Ok-ju	–	1	Lee Yong-kyung	Elected
23	Lee Doo-ah	–	23	Ahn Joo-ah	–	8	Lee Sang-kyu	–	2	Lee Han-jung	Elected
24	Kim Sung-dong	–	24	Cho Jae-hee	–	9	Hwang Sun	–	3	Yoo Won-il	–
25	Choi Kyung-hee	–	25	Bae Young-ae	–	10	Kim Young-gwan	–	4	Sun Kyung-sik	–
26	Lee Sang-cheol	–	26	Choi Se-kyu	–	NPP: 504,466 votes (2.9%), no seat			5	Oh Jeong-rye	–
27	Lee Young-ae	–	27	Yoon Byung-gil	–	1	Park Young-hee	–	6	Chung Koo-cheol	–
28	Park Jae-soon	–	28	Kim Nam-bae	–	2	Lee Nam-shin	–	7	Judith A. Hernandez	–
29	Choi Soon-ja	–	29	Lee Ye-ja	–	3	Pi Woo-jin	–	8	Kim Yang-hee	–
30	Cho Young-rae	–	30	Kim Eul-kyu	–	4	Kim Seok-joon	–	9	Lee Bong-soo	–
31	Moon Sook-kyung	–	31	Chung Yong-taek	–	5	Yoo Eui-sun	–	10	Kim Seok-soo	–
32	Lee Cheol-woong	–	CDWP: 443,775 votes (2.6%), no seat			6	Lee Sun-keun	–	11	Park Kyung-jin	–
33	Chung Jae-ryang	–	1	Kim Gil-ja	–	7	Lee Sun-hee	–	12	Yoo Je-youl	–
34	Ryu Myung-ryul	–	2	Kim Myung-gyu	–	8	Kim Sang-bong	–	PUFP: 180,857 votes (1.1%), no seat		
35	Yang Ji-yeon	–	3	Choi Soo-hwan	–	9	Cho Jeom-soon	–	1	Kwak Jung-hwan	–
36	Kong Ho-shik	–	4	Lee Jeong-jae	–	10	Kim Sang-ha	–	2	Hwang Sun-jo	–
37	Kang Wol-goo	–	5	Yoo Choong-jin	–	11	Choi Eun-hee	–	3	Yoon Jung-ro	–
38	Kim Kyung-ahn	–	6	Min Seung	–	NSP: 93,554 votes (0.5%), no seat			4	Yoo Jung-ok	–
39	Choi Soon-ae	–	7	Park Eun-shik	–	1	Yoo Jae-man	–	5	Son Dae-oh	–
40	Ahn Jong-bok	–	9	Yoon Jae-hee	–	2	Kim Tae-sun	–	6	Lee Kyung-joon	–
41	Son In-seok	–	10	Choi Sook-ja	–	3	Kang Seok-woo	–	7	Sim Woo-ok	–
42	Kim Gong-ja	–	CAP: 33,966 votes (0.2%), no seat			4	Lee Ae-ran	–	8	Moon Nan-young	–
43	Woo Shin-gu	–	1	Kim Won-yong	–	KSP: 35,496 votes (0.2%), no seat			9	Moon Soo-ja	–
44	Kim Young-hee	–	2	Lee Won-seok	–	1	Kim Hwa-jung	–	10	Moon Sang-hee	–
45	Kang Sung-man	–	3	Kim Sung-ok	–	2	Oh Joon-ho	–	11	Song Young-seok	–
46	Yoon Myung-sun	–	4	Kim Nam-hoon	–	CP: 17,656 votes (0.1%), no seat			12	Moon Pyeong-rae	–
47	Hong Jong-il	–	5	Hong Hyun-sun	–	1	Ryu Seung-goo	–	13	Yoon Tae-geun	–
48	Heo Nam-ju	–	6	Kwon Jung-sook	–						
49	Paik Ki-youp	–	7	Kim Young-jong	–						

=== 2004 ===
Notes

- #: List rank assigned by the party
- ~~Deleted candidate~~: Withdrew candidate

Proportional representation results in the 2004 South Korean legislative election
#	Candidate	Status	#	Candidate	Status	#	Candidate	Status	#	Candidate	Status
Uri: 8,145,814 votes (38.3%), 23 seats			GNP: 7,613,660 votes (35.8%), 21 seats			DLP: 2,774,061 votes (13.0%), 8 seats			MDP: 1,510,178 votes (7.1%), 4 seats		
1	Chang Hyang-sook	Elected	1	Kim Ae-sil	Elected	1	Sim Sang-jung	Elected	1	Son Bong-sook	Elected
2	Hong Chang-sun	Elected	2	Park Se-il	Elected	2	Dan Byung-ho	Elected	2	Kim Chong-in	Elected
3	Kim Myung-ja	Elected	3	Park Chan-sook	Elected	3	Lee Young-soon	Elected	3	Lee Seung-hee	Elected
4	Kim Hyuk-kyu	Elected	4	Yoon Kun-young	Elected	4	Chun Young-se	Elected	4	Kim Hong-il	Elected
5	Lee Kyung-sook	Elected	5	Song Young-sun	Elected	5	Choi Soon-young	Elected	5	Kim Song-ja	–
6	Park Chan-seok	Elected	6	Hwang Jin-ha	Elected	6	Kang Gi-gap	Elected	6	Chang Jae-shik	–
7	Hong Mi-young	Elected	7	Jeon Yeo-ok	Elected	7	Hyun Ae-ja	Elected	7	Kim Kang-ja	–
8	Cho Sung-tae	Elected	8	Chung Hwa-won	Elected	8	Roh Hoe-chan	Elected	8	Park Kang-soo	–
9	Park Young-sun	Elected	9	Lee Kye-kyung	Elected	9	Lee Joo-hee	–	9	Lee Jae-hee	–
10	Chung Eui-yong	Elected	10	Park Jae-wan	Elected	10	Lee Moon-ok	–	10	Park Gap-doh	–
11	Kim Hyun-mee	Elected	11	Na Kyung-won	Elected	11	Song Kyung-ah	–	11	Lee Chi-ho	–
12	Park Myung-gwang	Elected	12	Lee Ju-ho	Elected	12	Kim Seok-jin	–	12	Kim Kyung-cheon	–
13	Kim Young-joo	Elected	13	Kim Young-sook	Elected	13	Seok Soo-kyung	–	13	Song Jung-soon	–
14	Cho Sung-rae	Elected	14	Yoo Seong-min	Elected	14	Jeong Tae-heung	–	14	Cha Tae-seok	–
15	Kang Hye-sook	Elected	15	Koh Kyung-hwa	Elected	15	Lee Jeong-mi	–	15	Lee Geum-ra	–
16	Jeong Deok-goo	Elected	16	Lee Gun-hyeon	Elected	16	Kim Byung-il	–	16	Cho Nam-poong	–
17	Lee Eun-young	Elected	17	Jin Soo-hee	Elected	ULD: 600,462 votes (2.8%), no seat			17	Ahn Hee-ok	–
18	Min Byung-doo	Elected	18	Bae Il-do	Elected	1	Kim Jong-pil	–	18	Lee Yoon-ja	–
19	Yoon Won-ho	Elected	19	Ahn Myung-ok	Elected	2	Sung Wan-jong	–	19	Choi Youn-ja	–
20	Park Hong-soo	Elected	20	Seo Sang-ki	Elected	3	Cho Hee-wook	–	20	Park Se-joon	–
21	You Seung-hee	Elected	21	Park Soon-ja	Elected	4	Kim Jong-taek	–	21	Ahn Sung-rye	–
~~22~~	~~Chung Dong-young~~	–	22	Lee Sung-goo	–	5	Yoo Woon-young	–	22	Kim Chul-bae	–
23	Jang Bok-sim	Elected	23	Moon Hee	–	6	Lee Hee-ja	–	23	Kim Hyu-sup	–
24	Kim Jae-hong	Elected	24	Hwang In-tae	–	7	Shin Eun-sook	–	24	Chang Young-sook	–
25	Seo Hye-seok	–	25	Kwon Hyuk-ran	–	8	Kim Yong-joon	–	25	Lim Jeong-ji	–
26	Shin Myung	–	26	Ahn Hee-seok	–	9	Lee Byung-woo	–	26	Kim Young-ae	–
27	Kim Young-dae	–	27	Lee Yang-ja	–	10	Kim Young-il	–	CP: 228,837 votes (1.1%), no seat		
28	Na Doh-sun	–	28	Ra Kyung-kyun	–	11	Moon Do-yeon	–	1	Hwang San-sung	–
29	Choi Dong-kyu	–	29	Oh Kyung-ja	–	12	Park Bae-chul	–	2	Yoo Choong-jin	–
30	Yoon Sun-hee	–	30	Jeon Soon-eun	–	13	Oh Young-ja	–	3	Choi Soo-hwan	–
31	Kim Tae-rang	–	31	Chung Eun-sook	–	14	Kim Yong-hee	–	4	Koh Won-chae	–
32	Park Chung-ho	–	32	Bae Yong-soo	–	15	Kwon Kyung-ae	–	5	Chung In-wook	–
33	Kim Yang	–	33	Cha Won-gap	–	NU21: 119,746 votes (0.6%), no seat			6	Yoon Kye-sook	–
34	Noh Bok-mi	–	34	Kang Seok-ho	–	1	Lee In-won	–	7	Seo Kyung-ok	–
35	Choi Jong-won	–	35	Lim Chun-ja	–	2	Park Won-kyoung	–	8	Oh Joo-hwan	–
36	Koh Youn-ho	–	36	Yang Bang-seung	–	3	Lee Sook-ja	–	9	Ahn Haeng-gang	–
37	Han Haeng-soo	–	37	Lee Jeong-eun	–	4	Kim Moon-il	–	10	Sung Myung-sun	–
38	Kim Won-ja	–	38	Lee Jae-hwan	–	GSDP: 103,845 votes (0.5%), no seat			11	Nam Beom-hyun	–
39	Kim Ha-kyung	–	39	Choi Kyung-hee	–	1	Kang Sung-chun	–	12	Kim Hyo-jung	–
40	Ryu Jin-sook	–	40	Gil Gi-yeon	–	2	Lee Dong-ryul	–	13	Chung Sang-hoon	–
41	Kim Chan-ho	–	41	Shin Hyun-gook	–	3	Jeong Young-sook	–	14	Yoo Jung-sook	–
42	Jeon Hye-sook	–	42	Moon Sook-kyung	–	4	Choi Hae-kyung	–	SP: 47,311 votes (0.2%), no seat		
43	Kim Hong-sup	–	43	Nam Man-jin	–	5	Lee Hyu-sang	–	1	Park Jin-hee	–
44	Park Hyo-kyoung	–	DHP: 39,785 votes (0.2%), no seat			6	Yeo Kyung-mi	–	H2080: 31,501 votes (0.2%), no seat		
45	Lee Jae-young	–	1	Lee Tae-moon	–	DRP: 24,360 votes (0.1%), no seat			1	Roh Dong-sun	–
46	Kim Hee-sook	–	SRPP: 37,084 votes (0.2%), no seat			1	Huh Kyung-young	–	2	Noh Deok-hwan	–
47	Park Noh-hoon	–	1	Kim Jong-woong	–	2	Cho Sung-je	–	3	Yoo Hyuk-sang	–
48	Chung Sook-kyoung	–	2	Kim Jung-kyu	–				4	Lee In-hak	–
49	Park Eun-soo	–	3	Lee Jong-wan	–				5	Lee Seung-ha	–
50	Choi Eun-kyu	–							6	Ahn Hye-jin	–
51	Yoo Kwang-sa	–									
