= Kwon Yeong-guk =

South Korean politician (born 1963)

- 권영국
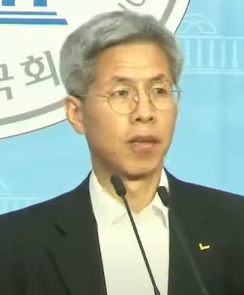
- Kwon in 2020

Leader of the Justice Party
- In office 28 May 2024 – 28 August 2026
- Preceded by: Kim Jun-woo; Kim Chan-hwi
- Succeeded by: Yang Gyeong-gyu

Personal details
- Born: 15 August 1963 (age 63) Gangwon, South Korea
- Party: Justice Party
- Occupation: Politician; lawyer

Korean name
- Hangul: 권영국
- RR: Gwon Yeongguk
- MR: Kwŏn Yŏngguk

Kwon Yeong-guk (Korean: 권영국; born 15 August 1963) is a South Korean politician and lawyer who was the nominee of the Democratic Labor Party in the 2025 South Korean presidential election.

== Early life and education ==
Kwon graduated from Seoul National University College of Engineering, Department of Metallurgical Engineering. He also attended Tokushima University Graduate School, at the Department of Composition Science.

== Election results ==
=== General elections ===
Year	Elections	Constituency	Political party	Votes (%)	Remarks
2016	20th National Assembly General Election	Gyeongju (North Gyeongsang)	Independent	20,253 (15.90%)	Defeated (3rd)
2020	21st National Assembly General Election	Gyeongju (North Gyeongsang)	Justice	16,937 (11.57%)	Defeated (3rd)
2024	22nd National Assembly General Election	Proportional representation (4th)	Green-Justice	609,313 (2.14%)	Not Elected

=== Local elections ===
==== Mayor of Seoul ====
Year	Elections	Constituency	Political party	Votes (%)	Remarks
2026	9th Iocal Election	Seoul (Mayoral Elections)	Justice	54,315 (1.04%)	Defeated (3rd)

=== Presidential elections ===
2025 South Korean presidential election
Party	Candidate	Votes	%
Democratic	Lee Jae Myung	17,287,513	49.42
People Power	Kim Moon-soo	14,395,639	41.15
Reform	Lee Jun-seok	2,917,523	8.34
Justice	Kwon Yeong-guk	344,150	0.98
Independent	Song Jin-ho	35,791	0.10
Total votes		35,236,497	100.00
Democratic gain from People Power			
