= Justice Party (South Korea) =

South Korean political party

Justice Party 정의당
- Abbreviation: JP
- Leader: Yang Gyeong-gyu
- Secretary-General: Na Soon-ja
- Chair of the Policy Planning Committee: Kim Yong-shin
- Founded: 21 October 2012
- Merger of: Labor Politics Solidarity; Progressive Gathering+; Labor Party (factions); Green Party (factions)
- Split from: Unified Progressive Party (old-NPP and PP factions)
- Headquarters: 7, Gukhoe-daero 70-, Yeongdeungpo District, Seoul
- Youth wing: 청년정의당 (Youth Justice Party)
- Ideology: Progressivism (South Korean); Liberalism (South Korean); Social democracy
- Political position: Centre-left to left-wing
- Regional affiliation: Network of Social Democracy in Asia
- International affiliation: Progressive Alliance (observer)
- Colours: Yellow
- Slogan: 가자! 평등으로 ('Advance! Towards Equality')
- National Assembly: 0 / 300
- Metropolitan mayors and governors: 0 / 16
- Municipal Mayors: 0 / 227
- Provincial and Metropolitan Councillors: 0 / 933
- Municipal Councillors: 6 / 3,034

Party flag

Website
- justice21.org

Korean name
- Hangul: 정의당
- Hanja: 正義黨
- RR: Jeonguidang
- MR: Chŏngŭidang

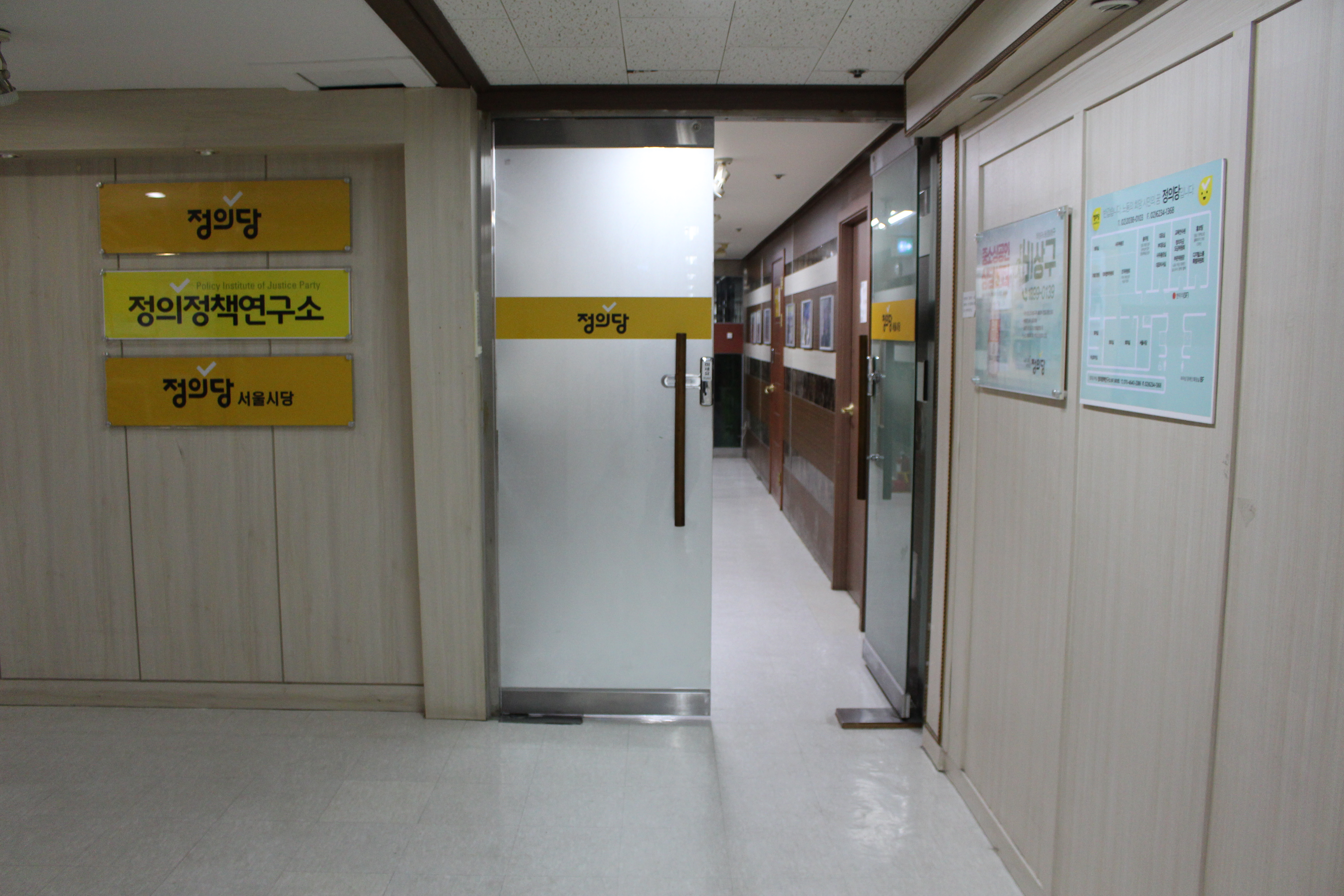
Headquarters and Seoul bureau of Justice Party (pictured in 2018)

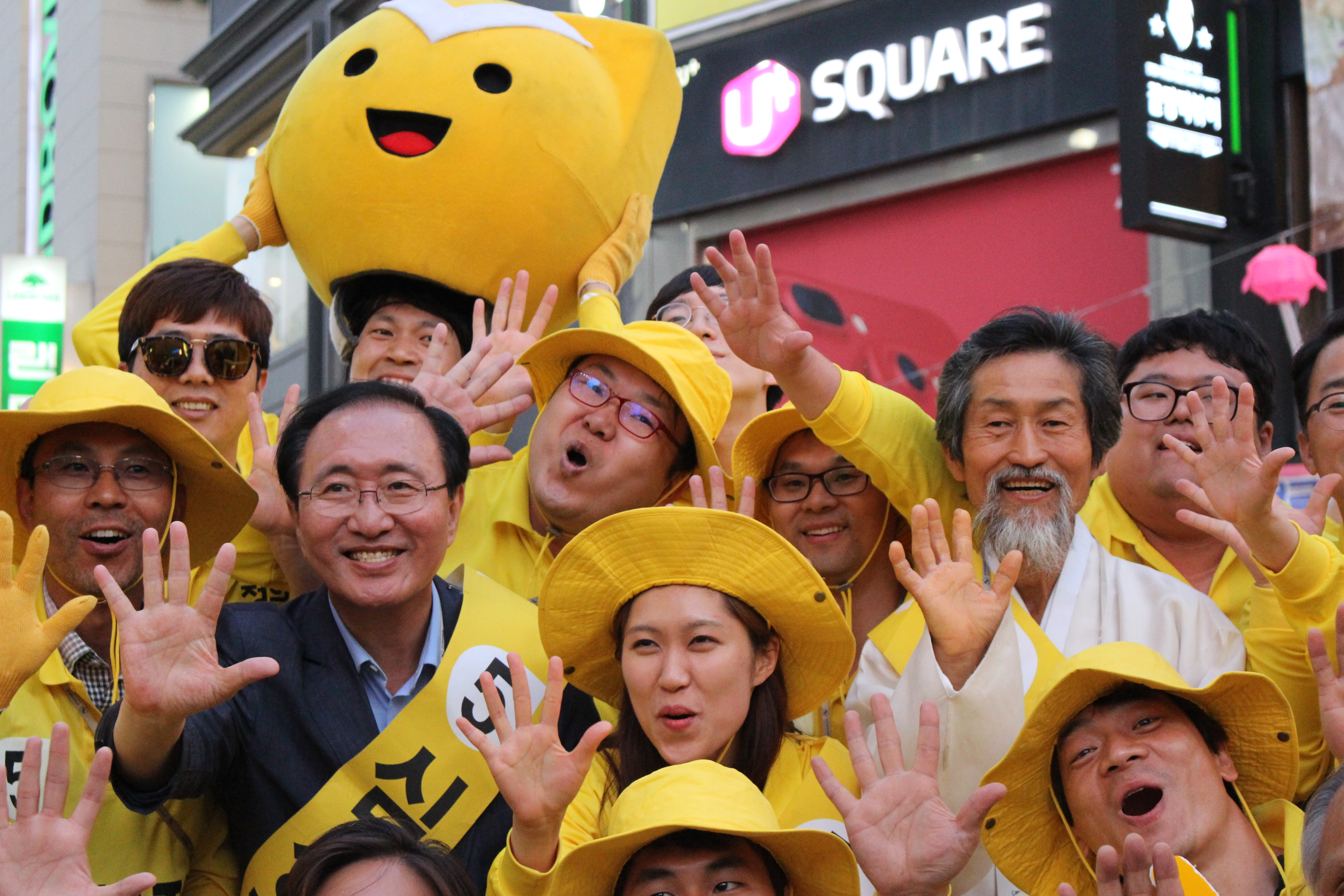
Roh Hoe-chan (left) and Kang Gi-gap (right) at Sim Sang-jung's campaign rally on 7 May during the presidential election in 2017

The Justice Party (JP; Korean: 정의당) is a centre-left to left-wing political party in South Korea. It has been described as liberal and progressive. It was founded on 21 October 2012 when the former New Progressive Party faction, former People's Participation Party faction, and moderates in the Unified Progressive Party split from the Unified Progressive Party. The Justice Party now takes a more moderate stance than the United Progressive Party or the Democratic Labor Party in the past.

During the run-up to the 2024 South Korean legislative election, the party saw a huge loss in membership, with much of the centre-left factions in the party leaving the party for the Democratic Party, Social Democratic Party, New Choice, New Reform Party, or New Future Party. The departing members included MP Ryu Ho-jeong (to New Reform), former leader Cheon Ho-sun (to Social Democratic Party), MP Bae Jin-kyo (to Democratic Party), former MP Park Won-suk (to New Future).

The Justice Party temporarily changed its name to "Green-Justice Party" (녹색정의당) on 30 January 2024 in an electoral pact with the Green Party Korea for the 2024 South Korean legislative election. On 27 April 2024, the party reverted back to its original name. On 5 March 2025, the Justice Party changed its name to the Democratic Labor Party (DLP; 민주노동당) to field a traffic-light coalition candidate for the 2025 presidential election, Kwon Yeong-guk.

== History ==
First logo of the Justice Party, used from 2013 to 2014

First logo of the Democratic Labor Party, used in 2025

The Progressive Justice Party changed its name to the Justice Party at the second party congress on 16 July 2013. At the fourth party congress on 22 November 2015, the party officially merged with the extra-parliamentary groups: Preparatory Committee for the People's Party (2015), Labor Politics Coalition (노동정치연대), Members of Labor Party, after motions to merge the party with the Justice Party failed.

After the merger, Na Gyung-che, Ex-leader of the Labor Party, and Kim Se-kyun, leader of Preparatory Committee for the People's Party, were elevated to co-leadership roles, while Sim Sang-jung remained as a standing party leader. Kim Se-kyun stepped down from the co-leadership role in September 2016.

In the legislative election held in April 2016, the party increased its seat total by one with the election of Roh Hoe-chan to the Seongsan constituency in the city of Changwon. The party polled 7.2% in the party list ballot, returning a total of six legislators to the National Assembly.

In the 2017 election, Sim Sang-jung ran as the party's nominee after winning the party primary. Sim was endorsed by Korean Confederation of Trade Unions (KCTU) and ran a campaign focused on labor and social issues. Sim received media attention for being the only candidate arguing in favor of marriage equality during the debate. Sim won 6.2% of the vote, making her the most successful left-wing presidential candidate since the democratization of the country in 1987.

In July 2017, with Sim's two-year leadership term coming to an end, the party elected sitting National Assembly member Lee Jeong-mi as the new leader over Park Won-suk by 56 to 44.

On 31 March 2018, the party confirmed its decision to form a parliamentary group with Party for Democracy and Peace, under the name of Members group of Peace and Justice. The parliamentary group would be officially registered on 2 April. The incumbent floor leader of the party, Roh Hoe-chan was chosen to head the parliamentary group in the National Assembly. Roh Hoe-chan's abrupt passing on 23 July 2018 resulted in the automatic dissolution of the parliamentary group. Roh's death was widely mourned, attracting thousands of mourners and tributes across the South Korean political spectrum. The party retained Roh's Changwon seat, beating Liberty Korea challenger in the by-election held on 13 April 2019.

In July 2019, the party elected Sim Sang-jung as the new leader. It is her second non-consecutive term as the party's leader.

Ahead of the Republic of Korea's 2022 South Korean presidential election, Rep. Sim Sang-jung was elected as a candidate and ran, and came in 3rd with 2.37% of the vote. After losing the 2022 South Korean local elections, the number of seats was significantly reduced, winning fewer seats than the Progressive Party.

A vote was cast in favor of the motion for the arrest of Representative Lee Jae-myung held at the National Assembly. Moderate groups within the party, represented by "New Progress" and others, criticized the party's vote for the arrest motion, saying it viewed the prosecution's repression as too weak.

During the run-up to the 2024 South Korean legislative election, the party saw a huge loss in membership, with much of the centre-left factions in the party leaving the party for the Democratic Party, New Reform Party, or New Future Party. The departing members included MP Ryu Ho-jeong (to New Reform), former leader Cheon Ho-sun (to Democratic Party), MP Bae Jin-kyo (to Democratic Party), former MP Park Won-suk (to New Future). In January 2024, the Justice Party formed an electoral coalition with the Green Party Korea for the 2024 South Korean legislative election. The coalition ran under the name "Green Justice Party" for the election, but did not win any seats. After losing her seat in a landslide, Sim Sang-jung announced her withdrawal from any future political activities.

Since 2025, the Justice Party has been working in solidarity with the Green Party and Labor Party, creating Korea's version of a left-wing traffic light coalition. The Labor Party announced in early 2025 that they would join the alliance, forming the traffic light coalition. Since the impeachment of President Yoon Suk-yeol triggered a presidential election, the three progressive parties announced that they would field a joint candidate, Kwon Yeong-guk.

On 5 May 2025, the Justice Party changed its name to the Democratic Labor Party ahead of the 2025 presidential election.

== Political position ==
The Justice Party's political position is mainly referred to as centre-left. However, in South Korea's conservative political structure, it is also called left-wing. In the South Korean political landscape, where the liberal Democratic Party (DPK) and the conservative People Power Party compete, JP is perceived as very radical. Candidates from both parties evaluated Justice Party candidate Sim Sang-jung as a radical, though some experts in South Korea have also evaluated the Justice Party as closer to the moderate than centre-left like social democratic parties in Europe. Also, some researchers have evaluated the JP as being centrist in German political standards.

The Justice Party officially advocates social democracy (사회민주주의) and liberalism (자유주의). The party symbol is derived from the first letter L of "Labor" (노동) and "Liberty" (자유). JP rejects social conservatism and takes a socially progressive stance on LGBT rights issues. JP has a prominent cultural liberal tendency, and is also considered a "social-liberal" party compared to the DPK, which is relatively "conservative-liberal" compared to the JP. Major JP politicians, including Jang Hye-young, criticize the DPK, but have a fairly favorable view of the U.S. Democratic Party style of modern liberalism and Joe Biden.

JP values fiscal responsibility and advocates tax increases for the creation of a welfare state. JP also opposes basic income. However, they are active in the area of labor rights, where left-liberal populists in the DPK are generally less interested.

Before the 2024 South Korean legislative election, most members of liberal-centrist factions left the party. After the party became extra-parliamentary, left-socialist tendencies emerged as the mainstream faction. In 2025 South Korean presidential election, party's new leader Kwon Yeong-guk declared a left-wing electoral alliance called Solidarity Council for The Social Transformation with Labor Party and Green Party Korea.

The Justice Party, like historical social-democratic to progressive parties or the liberal Uri Party in the past, advocates the abolition of the National Security Act.

== Ideology ==
=== Economy ===
The party calls for structural change of the Korean economy through change to the current chaebol-dominated economic system, democratic control of capitalistic excess through the implementation of economic democracy, and public ownership of basic utilities. The party is pursuing an alternative form of economic system in which basic standards of living are provided for everyone, equally. Where public ownership or the market economy are inefficient, the party advocates a social economy, including cooperatives, and further increasing the power levels of the social economy to that traditionally held by the market. The party also calls for the protection and increase of labor rights, and they promote unionization in the workplace, in order to equalize the power balance between capitalists and workers. The party advocates for the creation of a welfare state, drastically increasing funding in the public sector, providing universal welfare services such as childcare, education, employment, housing, healthcare, and post-retirement life. The party will fund these programs through increased taxation based on redistributive fiscal policy.

=== Environment ===
The party calls for an end to unrestricted development, pursuing sustainable development and climate justice. It is also in favor of animal welfare. It argues in favor of developing renewable energy, with an aim of doing away with oil and coal altogether. The party is against nuclear energy as an alternative, and advocates closing down old nuclear power plants and ceasing further construction of the plants.

=== Social issues ===
The party is the most socially progressive mainstream party in Korea calling for the eradication of all forms of discrimination, advocating increased participation of the minorities in the political sphere. It further advocates pursuing gender equality in the workplace and preserving women's right to choose to have an abortion. The party stands strongly against any form of oppression based on one's sexuality or gender identity. It calls for legislation cracking down on hate crimes to protect the human rights of minorities. It also acknowledges diverse family structures without any discrimination. The party also fields LGBT candidates in elections and its members have been the only politicians to be completely open in their support of LGBT rights such as same-sex marriage.

JP most actively supports multiculturalism and anti-racism among major political parties in South Korea. JP criticizes China and Japan's hegemonic moves, but opposes hate speech against Chinese people and Japanese people. The progressive Sim Sang-jung stated, "I will not use anti-American, anti-Chinese and anti-Japanese sentiment in politics" in the 2022 South Korean presidential election.

=== Foreign relations ===
In the midst of the conflict between the United States and China for regional hegemony and Japanese attempts at rearmament, the party believes peace in the Korean peninsula is a paramount issue. The party rejects any form of hegemony from both sides and refuses to take a side on the issue.

However, JP is much more critical of China than the United States. Representatively, there is an online dialogue with Ryu Ho-jeong and Joshua Wong in 2019, and in the same year, JP officially supported the Hong Kong democracy movement in 2019 at the party level. At the time, the main opposition LKP and the ruling DPK did not reveal the party's position in Hong Kong's pro-democracy movement, fearing excessive friction with China.

On the other hand, unlike JP's strong criticism of China, the level of criticism of the United States is weak and rather friendly. According to 2023 statistics, Justice Party supporters are more friendly to strengthening their alliance with the United States than Democratic Party of Korea supporters.

The reason why JP officially supports neutrality in the U.S.-China conflict is more related to anti-Japanese sentiment within the South Korean liberal camp than to sentiment toward the United States. JP opposes the "U.S.-led United States, Japan, and South Korea Triangle Alliance" (한미일 삼각 동맹). JP is also absolutely opposed to the entry of Japan's Self-Defense Forces into the Korean peninsula when a war breaks out on the Korean Peninsula.

Jang Hye-young, the party's main politician, is actively expressing her pro-American diplomatic and cultural views. She also participated in a project funded by the National Democratic Institute in the United States.

JP criticizes the ultra-nationalist project led by the Japanese conservative government, but, unlike DPK, opposes excessive use of anti-Japanese sentiment in economics and diplomacy. JP opposed DPK's anti-Japan diplomacy and PPP's anti-communist (anti-North Korea) diplomacy. However, JP is more sensitive to racism against Japanese people living in South Korea than DPK because it values political correctness, while diplomatically, it is more hawkish about Japan than DPK, which is also related to political correctness. For example, JP claims the 2015 Japan-South Korea Comfort Women Agreement as invalid, and JP criticized Moon Jae-in for saying the agreement was not invalid.

The Justice Party does not oppose Russian sanctions regarding the Russian invasion of Ukraine, but is opposed to supplying lethal aid to Ukraine.

==== North Korea ====
The Justice Party insists that diplomacy with North Korea should be approached with the values of universal human rights rather than an unconditional appeasement approach.

On 28 September 2020, Justice Party leader Sim Sang-jung expressed a critical view of the Democratic Party's conciliatory policy toward North Korea based on Korean nationalism, saying, "Some of the ruling party prioritize inter-Korean relations over the lives of our people, and this must be corrected." This critical view of North Korea, in particular, has deepened since 2020 due to conflicts with the ruling Democratic Party.

==== United States ====
On 5 June 2023, members of the Green Party of the United States, including 2020 presidential candidate Howie Hawkins, visited the National Assembly of the Republic of Korea to meet with Justice Party members of parliament Bae Jin-gyo and Sim Sang-jung. At the meeting, the Green Party of the United States and the Justice Party committed to an international effort to oppose the discharge of radioactive water of the Fukushima Daiichi Nuclear Power Plant by the Government of Japan. International Co-Chair of the Green Party US, Austin Bashore, also criticized the government of Seoul for banning the 2023 Korea Queer Culture Festival and asked the Korean government to respect the rights of racial minorities and immigrants to Korea.

== Factions ==
Logo of the "Green-Justice Party" for the 2024 legislative election.

According to the Hankyoreh, there are four major divisions within the Justice Party. Opinion groups are broadly divided into four groups. 'Incheon Union', 'Together Seoul', 'New Progress', 'Transformation'.

The party, after the 2024 legislative election, saw a leftward shift, with the Transformation (전환) faction taking the leading role in the party. This was concurrent with the complete withdrawal of Sim Sang-jung from the political field, and mass abandonment of the party by the New Progress (새로운진보) and a large number of Incheon Union leadership figures, like Bae Jin-kyo, and mainstream figures close to Sim Sang-jung like Ryu Ho-jeong. The party leadership consolidated to the left-wing democratic socialist faction, the party has been more active in working with Labor Party and Green Party, culminating in Red-Green-Yellow (노녹정) alliance since the 2024 election.

=== Transformation ===
"Transformation" (전환) is a left-wing political group within the Justice Party. The group was formed in 2021, and it is the largest leftist organization in the party. Transformation was created through the integration of the party's former leftist groups, 'Network for Equal Society', 'Labour Political Solidarity', 'Democratic Socialists' and 'Momentum'. It supports progressivism and democratic socialism. Members include Yang Gyeong-gyu, former first vice-representative of the Democratic Labor Party, and Kim Yun-gi, former vice-representative of the Justice Party.

Inaugural Remarks at the "Transformation" Launch Ceremony on August 21, 2022

"The second act of progressive politics must start based on a clear ideology and route," he said. "We cannot compromise with the vested interests of the 6th Republic – the capitalist order," he said. "Democratic Socialism" to achieve socialist ideals democratically and "Ecological Socialism" to realize climate justice to burn capitalism instead of coal will move forward to establish a new society."

— Inaugural Statement of Transition

Transformation is emphasizing solidarity with other left-wing parties, such as the Progressive Party and the Green Party, saying that "Homework is solidarity with the progressive left" about the general election.

=== Participatory ===
The "Participatory" group (참여계) is a pro-DPK "liberals" of the Justice Party. It is called the Participation Party because it is a faction in which members of the former Participation Party party become the mainstream. As a set of moderate members of the party, it shows a pro-Roh Moo-hyun tendency.

Most of these participants belong to an opinion group called "New Progress" (새로운 진보). This faction evaluated that the decline in the Justice Party's support was due to the ambivalence criticizing both the Democratic Party and the People Power Party, and he pointed out that the Justice Party represented too much of feminist interests instead of those of"'workers and citizens". They also called for the resignation of proportional representation members and the retirement of Sim Sang-jung from politics. They also demanded the abolition of youth and female quotas to fully reflect the will of party members.

After the local elections, New Progress said in a statement on 7 June 2022.

This is because he was disappointed with the Justice Party first before being disappointed with the Democratic Party. The current address of the Justice Party is the perception that it is not a 'party for workers and citizens' but a 'party with unlikable intellectual feminism'.

— Statement from the new progressive Facebook

The New Progress faction voted in favor of the motion to arrest Lee Jae-myung in 2023, saying that the party seems to be taking a position closer to the People Power Party rather than the Democratic Party of Korea, and criticized it. Although belonging to this faction, there are many people who have left the Justice Party due to dissatisfaction with the Justice Party's line.

"New Progress" said the following in a statement related to the chaepo (arrest) motion.

"In this position of the Justice Party leadership (voting in favor of the motion for arrest according to the party's theory of abolishing the privilege of non-arrest), there is no awareness of the problem of the Prosecution Republic's arbitrary abuse of the right to investigate and prosecute, and there is no consideration for the people's concerns about it. It would be the Justice Party's position to go out and be investigated if you are confident and innocent. However, the response to the Yoon Seok-yeol government's investigation into political elimination, which is moving toward a prosecution republic, cannot be 'live kindly'.

— A statement issued on February 13 related to Saejinbo's 'capture motion'

On 6 June 2023, 60 members of New Progressive left the Party with the intention of forming their own political party. In the defections included spokeswoman Whi Seon-hee, former spokesperson Jeong Ho-jin, Gangwon-do chairperson Song Chi-young, former Party Vice-Chair Jeong hye-hyeon, former Gangwon-do party chairperson Lim Seong-dae, and Chungbuk-do chairperson Lee Hyeon-rim. Former Justice Party leader Cheon Ho-seon, who left the party in late 2022, also announced their intention to join the new Party.

The New Progress faction left the party before the 2024 legislative election, joining the Democratic Party or the Social Democratic Party. New Progress faction, and in extension, the "Participatory" group, does not exist in the party as a cohesive faction.

=== Incheon Union/Together Seoul ===
The "Incheon Union" (인천연합) is mentioned as the largest faction within the party. Former party leader Lee Jeong-mi and National Assembly member Bae Jin-gyo are representative figures. They stand as culturally liberal/progressive and their economical policies allude to non-radical social democracy, but they diplomatically support anti-imperialism and Korean nationalism.

=== Together Seoul ===
The "Together Seoul" is a faction that has separated from the Incheon Union due to differences in political positions. The Together Seoul group is considered more radical on cultural and diplomatic policies than the Incheon Union.

=== Third Power ===
The "Third Power" faction was a faction that argued the Justice Party should re-establish as a new party and move beyond progressive politics to voters outside the two major parties. The Third Power faction left the party to co-found New Choice, alongside Keum Tae-sup, New Choice later merged into Lee Jun-seok's Reform Party.

== Leadership ==
=== Leaders ===
1. Roh Hoe-chan, Cho Jun-ho (co-serving; 21 October 2012 – 21 July 2013)
2. Cheon Ho-sun (21 July 2013 – 18 July 2015)
3. Sim Sang-jung (18 July 2015 – 11 July 2017)
  - Kim Se-kyun (co-serving; 22 November 2015 – 30 September 2016)
  - Na Gyung-che (co-serving; 22 November 2015 – 11 July 2017)
4. Lee Jeong-mi (11 July 2017 – 13 July 2019)
5. Sim Sang-jung (13 July 2019 – 12 October 2020)
6. Kim Jong-cheol (12 October 2020 – 25 January 2021)
7. Kim Yun-ki (25 January 2021 – 29 January 2021) (Interim)
8. Kang Eun-mi (29 January 2021 – 23 March 2021) (Interim)
9. Yeo Yeong-gug (23 March 2021 – 2 June 2022)
10. Lee Eun-ju (2 June 2022 – 28 October 2022) (Interim)
11. Lee Jeong-mi (28 October 2022 – 6 November 2023)
12. Bae Jin-gyo (6 November 2023 – 15 November 2023) (Interim)
13. Kim Jun-woo (15 November 2023 – 30 January 2024) (Interim)
14. Kim Jun-woo, Kim Chan-hwi (co-serving; 30 January 2024 – 27 May 2024)
15. Kwon Yeong-guk (28 May 2024 – 29 August 2026)
16. Yang Gyeong-gyu (29 August 2026 – present)

=== Floor leaders ===
1. Kang Dong-won (21 October 2012 – 2 May 2013)
2. Sim Sang-jung (13 July 2013 – 9 June 2015)
3. Chung Jin-hu (9 June 2015 – 29 May 2016)
4. Roh Hoe-chan (30 May 2016 – 23 July 2018)
5. Yoon So-ha (23 July 2018 – 29 May 2020)
6. Bae Jin-gyo (30 May 2020 – 1 September 2020)
7. Kang Eun-mi (9 September 2020 – 3 May 2021)
8. Bae Jin-gyo (4 May 2021 – 4 May 2022)
9. Lee Eun-ju (4 May 2022 – 9 May 2023)
10. Bae Jin-gyo (9 May 2023 – 14 February 2024)
11. Sim Sang-jung (20 February 2024 – 11 April 2024)
12. Jang Hye-young (11 April 2024 – 29 May 2024)

== Election results ==
=== President ===
Election	Candidate	Votes	%	Result
2017	Sim Sang-jung	2,017,458	6.17	Lost
2022	Sim Sang-jung	803,358	2.38	Lost
2025	Kwon Yeong-guk	344,150	0.98	Lost

=== Legislature ===
Election	Leader	Constituency		Party list		Seats	Position	Status
Election	Leader	Votes	%	Votes	%	Seats	Position	Status
2016	Sim Sang-jung	395,357	1.65	1,719,891	7.24	6 / 300	4th	Opposition
2020	Sim Sang-jung	492,100	1.71	2,697,956	9.67	6 / 300	▲3rd	Opposition
2024	Kim Jun-woo Kim Chan-hwi	107,029	0.37	609,313	2.15	0 / 300	▼	Extra-parliamentary

=== Local ===
Election	Leader	Metropolitan mayor/Governor	Provincial legislature	Municipal mayor	Municipal legislature
2014	Cheon Ho-sun	0 / 17	0 / 789	0 / 226	11 / 2,898
2018	Lee Jeong-mi	0 / 17	11 / 824	0 / 226	26 / 2,927
2022	Yeo Yeong-gug	0 / 17	2 / 824	0 / 226	7 / 2,927

== See also ==
- Anti-racism
- Cultural liberalism
- Diversity (politics)
- Jasmine Bacurnay Lee
- LGBT rights in South Korea — Justice Party is known as the most LGBT-friendly political party in South Korea.
- Labor Party (South Korea)
- Green Party Korea
- Progressive Party (South Korea, 2017)
- Third Power (South Korea)
