= Migrants' Trade Union in Korea =

South Korean trade union

The Migrants' Trade Union (MTU) in Korea was established on May 3, 2005 by 91 workers in South Korea. It was established to address poor working conditions and wage theft, widespread inequality and discrimination at the workplace. MTU has focused on achieving legal rights and recognition for undocumented migrants in South Korea.

== History ==
=== Prior to the MTU ===
Until the late 1990s, migrant workers support system existed in South Korea and focused on individual cases of human rights deprivations. With the implementation of Employment Permit System (EPS), many organizations formed migrant workers support movement from the perspective of labor unionism. Most foreign worker groups and labor unions that participated in Myeongdong Cathedral sit-in protests for migrant workers' rights such as Joint Committee for Migrant Workers in Korea (JCMK), agreed on the government's offer and ended their protests in early 2004. However, Migrant Branch with the Equality Trade Union (ETU-MB) did not accept the offer and continued their protest until November 2004. From ETU-MB's continued protest for migrant workers' rights as well as demand for a better employment system, ETU-MB split up from ETU and organized MTU in 2005, mainly led by migrant workers in the Seoul-Gyeonggi-Incheon area.

=== Fight for Legal Recognition ===
The Seoul Regional Labor Administration initially rejected the migrant workers' application for official labor union recognition. The migrant workers filed a lawsuit, but the lower court upheld the first ruling and again denied the MTU legal recognition as a labor union. However, the appeals court subsequently sided with the plaintiffs, forwarding the case to the Supreme Court for a final ruling. While the South Korean Supreme Court kept the status of the labor union in limbo for eight years, the first six leaders of the Migrants' Trade Union—including Michael Catuira—were deported from South Korea. Ten years after migrant workers first filed the lawsuit, the Korean Supreme Court decided in a landmark case and ruled in favor of the Seoul-Gyeonggi-Incheon Migrants' Trade Union that even undocumented migrant workers can establish and join labor unions.

== Criticism of the MTU ==
MTU is affiliated to the Seoul Regional Council of the Korean Confederation of Trade Unions, therefore it lacks a national support network of migrant workers. There are regional migrant support programs, but they are not necessarily specific to workers or labor unionism.

== See also ==
- Trade unions in South Korea
- Deportation from South Korea
