= Cheon Ho-sun =

South Korean politician (born 1962)

- Hangul: 천호선
- Hanja: 千皓宣
- RR: Cheon Hoseon
- MR: Ch'ŏn Hosŏn

Cheon Ho-sun (Korean: 천호선; born September 10, 1962), alternatively spelled Chun Ho-sun, is a South Korean politician. He has a bachelor's degree in sociology from Yonsei University. He is the chairman of Justice Party.

He was born in Seoul, South Korea.

== Election results ==
Year	Elections	Constituency	Political party	Votes (%)	Results
2010	2010 By-election	Eunpyeong B (Seoul)	People's Participation	–	Resigned
2012	19th National Assembly General Election	Eunpyeong B (Seoul)	United Progressive	61,779 (48.37%)	Defeated (2nd)
2014	2014 By-election	Suwon D (Gyeonggi)	Justice	–	Resigned
