= Participation Party =

2010–2011 political party in South Korea

Participation Party 국민참여당
- Leader: Rhyu Si-min
- Founded: 17 January 2010
- Dissolved: 13 December 2011
- Split from: Grand Unified Democratic New Party; Democratic Party (2008)
- Merged into: Unified Progressive Party
- Succeeded by: Citizens Unity Party (factions)
- Headquarters: 5-5 Changjeon-dong, Mapo-gu, Seoul, South Korea
- Ideology: Liberalism (South Korean); Progressivism (South Korean)
- Political position: Centre-left
- Colours: Yellow

Website
- handypia.org archived

- Participation Party
- Hangul: 국민참여당
- Hanja: 國民參與黨
- RR: Gungmin chamyeodang
- MR: Kungmin ch'amyŏdang

The Participation Party (PPP; Korean: 국민참여당, lit. 'People's Participation Party') was a political party of South Korea. It was formed by many of the former members of the Uri Party after the death of former President Roh Moo-hyun. Rhyu Si-min was elected as Party Chairman on March 19, 2011. In March 2011 it had 45,335 members. For the April 27 by-elections, the People's Participation Party has cooperated with the Democratic Party to enter Lee Bong-su as the single opposition candidate for the Kimhae seat in the National Assembly of South Korea. On 5 December 2011, it merged into the Unified Progressive Party.

== Notable members ==
- Rhyu Si-min, 유시민, former Minister of Health and Welfare and National Assembly MP
- Cheon Ho-sun, 천호선, former Speaker of the Blue House
- Lee Byeong-Wan, 이병완, former Chief of Staff of Presidents Kim Dae-jung and Roh Moo-hyun

== See also ==
- Politics of South Korea
- Lists of political parties
- Justice Party (South Korea)
