= Progressive Gathering+ =

South Korean political organisation

- Leader: Na Gyung-che
- Founded: 8 August 2015
- Dissolved: 22 November 2015
- Split from: Labor Party
- Merged into: Justice Party
- Headquarters: Gwanak-gu, Seoul, South Korea
- Ideology: Progressivism; Social democracy Ecology; Pacifism
- Colors: Red
- National Assembly: 0 / 298
- Metropolitan mayors and provincial governors: 0 / 17
- Heads of basic local governments: 0 / 226
- Metropolitan council members: 1 / 789
- Local council members: 3 / 2,898

Korean name
- Hangul: 진보결집+
- RR: Jinbo gyeoljip+
- MR: Chinbo kyŏlchip+

Progressive Gathering+ (Korean: 진보결집+) was a political group comprising members from the Labor Party who advocated for a merger with the Justice Party.

== History ==
In November 2015, a decision was made to form a unified progressive party, by merging the Justice Party, Progressive Gathering+, Labor Politics Solidarity and the National Gathering.

Following the merger, Progressive Gathering+ changed its name to the "Network for an Equal Society" and became active as a faction within the Justice Party.

Its members included Na Gyung-che, Kang Sang-gu, Kim Jeong-jin, Jang Seok-jun, Kwon Tae-hoon and Kim Jong-cheol.

== See also ==
- Justice Party
- Labor Party
- Labor Politics Solidarity
