= Lee Jeong-mi =

South Korean politician (born 1966)

- 이정미
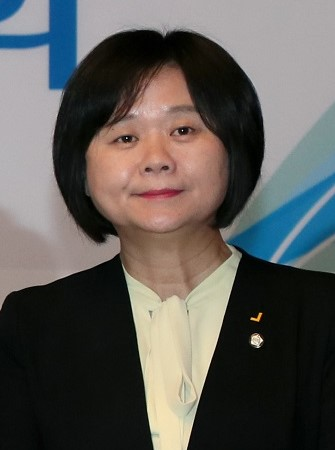
- Lee in 2019

Leader of the Justice Party
- In office 28 October 2022 – 6 November 2023
- Preceded by: Yeo Yeong-gug; Lee Eun-ju (acting)
- Succeeded by: Bae Jin-gyo (acting)
- In office 11 July 2017 – 13 July 2019
- Preceded by: Sim Sang-jung
- Succeeded by: Sim Sang-jung

Member of the National Assembly
- In office 30 May 2016 – 29 May 2020
- Constituency: Proportional representation

Personal details
- Born: 7 February 1966 (age 60) Busan, South Korea
- Party: Justice Party
- Other political affiliations: Democratic Labor (2000–2011); Unified Progressive (2011–2012)
- Education: Hankuk University of Foreign Studies
- Religion: Roman Catholic (Christian name - Othilia)

Korean name
- Hangul: 이정미
- Hanja: 李貞味
- RR: I Jeongmi
- MR: I Chŏngmi

Lee Jeong-mi (Korean: 이정미; born 7 February 1966 in Busan) is a South Korean politician. She was the leader of the Justice Party since from 28 October 2022 to 6 November 2023. and previously served as leader from 2017 to 2019 following the previous leadership tenures of Sim Sang-jung. She served as a member of the 20th National Assembly from 2016 to 2020.

In early December 2023, Lee announced on her personal Facebook page that a tumor was found in her right kidney during a health checkup, and surgery was completed in January 2024. She said that it was stage 1 kidney cancer, and since it was discovered early, it had not metastasized to other organs, so the surgery was not that difficult and that she would focus on recovering. Lee did not run in the 2024 parliamentary election.

== Election results ==
=== General elections ===
Year	Elections	Constituency	Political party	Votes (%)	Results
2004	17th National Assembly General Election	Proportional representation (15th)	DLP	2,774,061 (13.03%)	Not Elected
2008	17th National Assembly General Election	Yeongdeungpo A (Seoul)	DLP	3,352 (4.17%)	Defeated (4th)
2014	2014 By-election	Suwon C (Gyeonggi)	Justice	–	Resigned
2016	20th National Assembly General Election	Proportional representation (1st)	Justice	1,719,891 (7.23%)	Elected
2020	21st National Assembly General Election	Yeonsu B (Incheon)	Justice	23,183 (18.35%)	Defeated (3rd)

=== Local elections ===
==== Mayor of Incheon ====
Year	Elections	Constituency	Political party	Votes (%)	Remarks
2022	8th Iocal Election	Incheon (Mayoral Election)	Justice	38,921 (3.17%)	Defeated (3rd)
