= 2026 South Korean local elections =

- 3 June 2026

16 regional heads 933 regional councilors 227 municipal mayors 3,034 municipal councilors
- Registered: 34,079,860
- Turnout: 27,253,457; 61.0% (▲10.1pp)
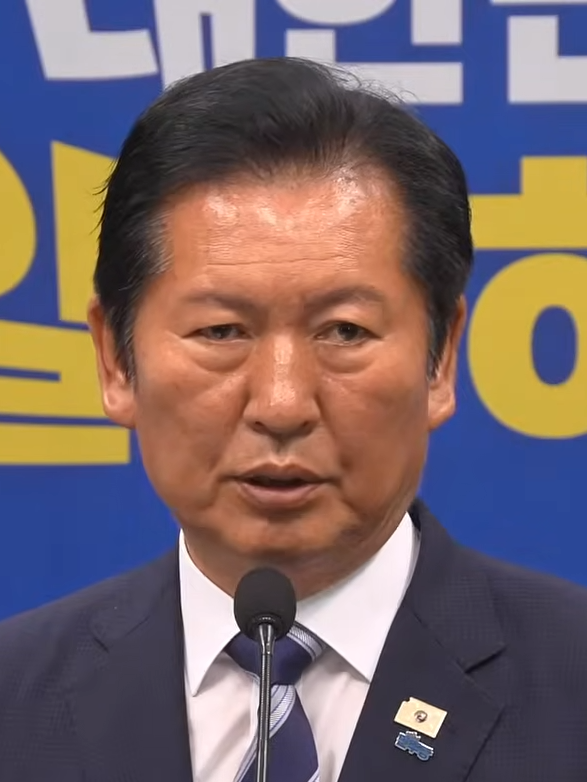

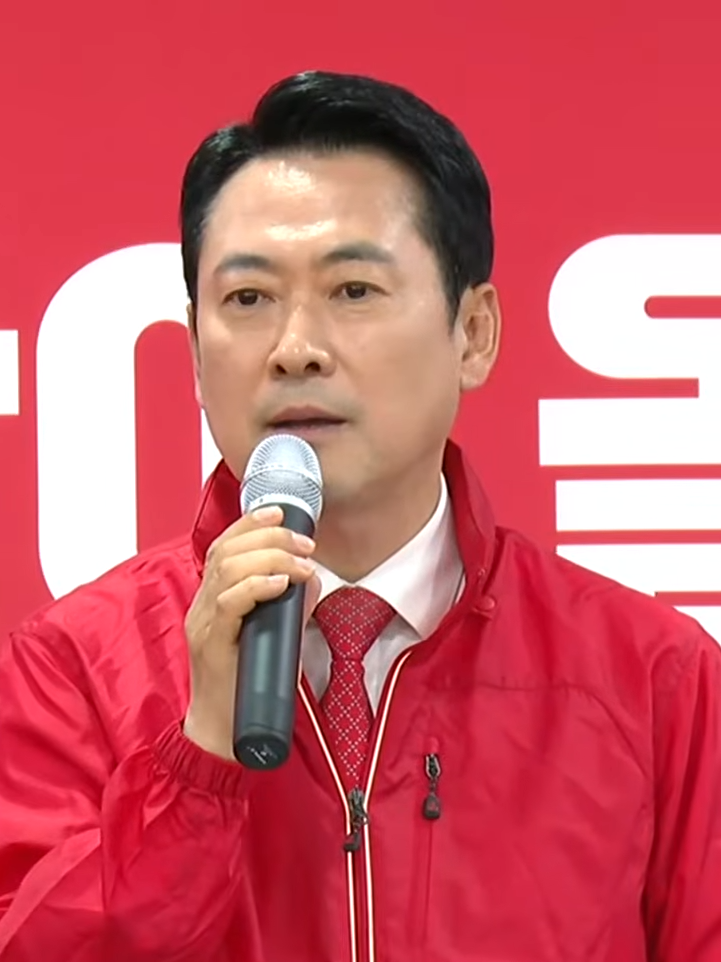
	First party	Second party
Leader	Jung Chung-rae	Jang Dong-hyeok
Party	Democratic	People Power
Regional seats last election	5 heads 322 councilors	12 heads 540 councilors
Municipal seats last election	63 mayors 1,384 councilors	145 mayors 1,435 councilors
Regional seats won	12 heads 589 councilors	4 heads 327 councilors
Regional seat change	▲7 heads ▲267 councilors	▼8 heads ▼213 councilors
Municipal seats won	119 mayors 1,574 councilors	95 mayors 1,277 councilors
Municipal seat change	▲56 mayors ▲190 councilors	▼50 mayors ▼158 councilors

The ninth local elections in South Korea (Korean: 제9회 전국동시지방선거) were held on 3 June 2026 for 4,227 public officials including 16 metropolitan mayors and provincial governors, 227 municipal mayors, 933 metropolitan and provincial councillors, 3,035 municipal councillors, and 16 superintendents of education.

Of the elections for the 16 metropolitan mayors and governors, the ruling Democratic Party won 12 races in a landslide victory, while the opposition People Power Party managed to hold 4, including the mayorship of Seoul.

== Background ==
Citizens born before 4 June 2008 have the right to vote and the right to be elected. 2026 South Korean by-elections will be also held during the local elections.

== Regional head elections ==
=== Summary ===
Province/City	Head	Incumbent	Party	Elected	Party
Seoul	Mayor	Oh Se-hoon	People Power	Oh Se-hoon	People Power
Jeonnam-Gwangju	Mayor	New		Min Hyung-bae	Democratic
Busan	Mayor	Park Heong-joon	People Power	Chun Jae-soo	Democratic
Daegu	Mayor	Kim Jeong-gi (acting)	Independent	Choo Kyung-ho	People Power
Incheon	Mayor	Yoo Jeong-bok	People Power	Park Chan-dae	Democratic
Daejeon	Mayor	Lee Jang-woo	People Power	Heo Tae-jeong	Democratic
Ulsan	Mayor	Kim Doo-gyum	People Power	Kim Sang-wook	Democratic
Sejong	Mayor	Choi Min-ho	People Power	Cho Sang-ho	Democratic
Gyeonggi	Governor	Kim Dong-yeon	Democratic	Choo Mi-ae	Democratic
Gangwon	Governor	Kim Jin-tae	People Power	Woo Sang-ho	Democratic
North Chungcheong	Governor	Kim Young-hwan	People Power	Shin Yong-han	Democratic
South Chungcheong	Governor	Kim Tae-heum	People Power	Park Soo-hyun	Democratic
North Jeolla	Governor	Kim Kwan-young	Independent	Lee Won-taeg	Democratic
North Gyeongsang	Governor	Lee Cheol-woo	People Power	Lee Cheol-woo	People Power
South Gyeongsang	Governor	Park Wan-su	People Power	Park Wan-su	People Power
Jeju	Governor	Oh Young-hun	Democratic	Wi Seong-gon	Democratic

=== Seoul ===
Incumbent mayor of Seoul Oh Se-hoon of the People Power Party was re-elected to a fifth term.

Candidate	Party	Votes	%
Oh Se-hoon (incumbent)	People Power Party	2,575,819	49.22
Chong Won-o	Democratic Party	2,515,560	48.07
Kwon Yeong-guk	Justice Party	54,315	1.04
Yoo Ji-hye	Women's Party	43,967	0.84
Kim Jeong-cheol	Reform Party	43,321	0.83
Total		5,232,982	100.00
Valid votes		5,232,982	98.93
Invalid/blank votes		56,401	1.07
Total votes		5,289,383	100.00
Registered voters/turnout		8,319,134	63.58
People Power hold			
Source: National Election Commission

=== Jeonnam–Gwangju ===
South Jeolla Province and Gwangju are set to merge into the special city of Jeonnam–Gwangju on 1 July 2026.

Incumbent governor of South Jeolla Province Kim Yung-rok and incumbent mayor of Gwangju Kang Gi-jung, both from the Democratic Party, did not run for mayor of Jeonnam–Gwangju. The Democratic Party nominated former National Assembly member for Gwangsan B, Gwangju Min Hyung-bae, who won the election.

Candidate	Party	Votes	%
Min Hyung-bae	Democratic Party	1,283,402	79.02
Lee Jung-hyun	People Power Party	189,718	11.68
Kang Eun-mi	Justice Party	62,616	3.86
Lee Jong-wook	Progressive Party	60,371	3.72
Kim Kwang-man	Independent	28,125	1.73
Total		1,624,232	100.00
Valid votes		1,624,232	97.24
Invalid/blank votes		46,024	2.76
Total votes		1,670,256	100.00
Registered voters/turnout		2,747,725	60.79
Democratic gain			
Source: National Election Commission

=== Busan ===
Incumbent mayor of Busan Park Heong-joon of the People Power Party ran for re-election to a third term, but was defeated by former Minister of Oceans and Fisheries Chun Jae-soo of the Democratic Party.

Candidate	Party	Votes	%
Chun Jae-soo	Democratic Party	885,608	50.53
Park Heong-joon (incumbent)	People Power Party	839,667	47.91
Jeong Ihan	Reform Party	27,418	1.56
Total		1,752,693	100.00
Valid votes		1,752,693	98.71
Invalid/blank votes		22,981	1.29
Total votes		1,775,674	100.00
Registered voters/turnout		2,857,335	62.14
Democratic gain from People Power			
Source: National Election Commission

=== Daegu ===
Kim Jeong-gi had been serving as acting mayor of Daegu since 11 April 2025, after Hong Joon-pyo of the People Power Party (PPP) resigned. The PPP nominated former National Assembly member for Dalseong, Daegu Choo Kyung-ho, who won the election.

Candidate	Party	Votes	%
Choo Kyung-ho	People Power Party	702,421	53.92
Kim Boo-kyum	Democratic Party	586,927	45.06
Lee Su-chan	Reform Party	13,324	1.02
Total		1,302,672	100.00
Valid votes		1,302,672	98.92
Invalid/blank votes		14,158	1.08
Total votes		1,316,830	100.00
Registered voters/turnout		2,049,683	64.25
People Power hold			
Source: National Election Commission

=== Incheon ===
Incumbent mayor of Incheon Yoo Jeong-bok of the People Power Party ran for re-election to a third term, but was defeated by former National Assembly member for Yeonsu A, Incheon Park Chan-dae of the Democratic Party.

Candidate	Party	Votes	%
Park Chan-dae	Democratic Party	809,426	52.84
Yoo Jeong-bok (incumbent)	People Power Party	705,622	46.06
Rhee Kee-Bung	Reform Party	16,788	1.10
Total		1,531,836	100.00
Valid votes		1,531,836	98.90
Invalid/blank votes		17,078	1.10
Total votes		1,548,914	100.00
Registered voters/turnout		2,663,459	58.15
Democratic gain from People Power			
Source: National Election Commission

=== Daejeon ===
Incumbent mayor of Daejeon Lee Jang-woo of the People Power Party ran for re-election to a second term, but was defeated by his predecessor, former mayor of Daejeon Heo Tae-jeong of the Democratic Party in a rematch.

Candidate	Party	Votes	%
Heo Tae-jeong	Democratic Party	394,391	53.49
Lee Jang-woo (incumbent)	People Power Party	325,589	44.16
Kang Heelin	Reform Party	17,370	2.36
Total		737,350	100.00
Valid votes		737,350	98.75
Invalid/blank votes		9,330	1.25
Total votes		746,680	100.00
Registered voters/turnout		1,250,891	59.69
Democratic gain from People Power			
Source: National Election Commission

=== Ulsan ===
Incumbent mayor of Ulsan Kim Doo-gyeom of the People Power Party ran for re-election to a second term, but was defeated by former National Assembly member for Nam A, Ulsan Kim Sang-wook of the Democratic Party.

Candidate	Party	Votes	%
Kim Sang-wook	Democratic Party	285,294	48.73
Kim Doo-gyeom (incumbent)	People Power Party	267,789	45.74
Park Maeng-woo	Independent	32,363	5.53
Total		585,446	100.00
Valid votes		585,446	97.59
Invalid/blank votes		14,444	2.41
Total votes		599,890	100.00
Registered voters/turnout		936,171	64.08
Democratic gain from People Power			
Source: National Election Commission

=== Sejong ===
Incumbent mayor of Sejong Choi Min-ho of the People Power Party ran for re-election to a second term, but was defeated by former vice mayor of Sejong for economic affairs Cho Sang-ho of the Democratic Party.

Candidate	Party	Votes	%
Cho Sang-ho	Democratic Party	116,846	61.04
Choi Min-ho (incumbent)	People Power Party	68,944	36.02
Ha Heon-hwi	Reform Party	5,641	2.95
Total		191,431	100.00
Valid votes		191,431	99.08
Invalid/blank votes		1,784	0.92
Total votes		193,215	100.00
Registered voters/turnout		309,134	62.50
Democratic gain from People Power			
Source: National Election Commission

=== Gyeonggi ===
Incumbent governor of Gyeonggi Province Kim Dong-yeon of the Democratic Party lost renomination to former National Assembly member for Hanam A, Gyeonggi Choo Mi-ae, who won the election.

Candidate	Party	Votes	%
Choo Mi-ae	Democratic Party	3,760,080	55.04
Yang Hyang-ja	People Power Party	2,689,879	39.38
Cho Eung-chun	Reform Party	295,232	4.32
Hong Seong-kyu	Progressive Party	46,677	0.68
Kim Hyeon-uk	People Union	39,360	0.58
Total		6,831,228	100.00
Valid votes		6,831,228	98.55
Invalid/blank votes		100,800	1.45
Total votes		6,932,028	100.00
Registered voters/turnout		11,878,997	58.36
Democratic hold			
Source: National Election Commission

=== Gangwon ===
Incumbent governor of Gangwon Province Kim Jin-tae of the People Power Party ran for re-election to a second term, but was defeated by former National Assembly member for Seodaemun A, Seoul Woo Sang-ho of the Democratic Party.

Candidate	Party	Votes	%
Woo Sang-ho	Democratic Party	437,583	51.81
Kim Jin-tae (incumbent)	People Power Party	406,950	48.19
Total		844,533	100.00
Valid votes		844,533	98.40
Invalid/blank votes		13,737	1.60
Total votes		858,270	100.00
Registered voters/turnout		1,329,742	64.54
Democratic gain from People Power			
Source: National Election Commission

=== North Chungcheong ===
Incumbent governor of North Chungcheong Province Kim Young-hwan of the People Power Party ran for re-election to a second term, but was defeated by Shin Yong-han of the Democratic Party.

Candidate	Party	Votes	%
Shin Yong-han	Democratic Party	445,868	54.58
Kim Young-hwan (incumbent)	People Power Party	371,067	45.42
Total		816,935	100.00
Valid votes		816,935	98.10
Invalid/blank votes		15,786	1.90
Total votes		832,721	100.00
Registered voters/turnout		1,396,588	59.63
Democratic gain from People Power			
Source: National Election Commission

=== South Chungcheong ===
Incumbent governor of South Chungcheong Province Kim Tae-heum of the People Power Party ran for re-election to a second term, but was defeated by former National Assembly member for Gongju–Buyeo–Cheongyang, South Chungcheong Park Soo-hyun of the Democratic Party.

Candidate	Party	Votes	%
Park Soo-hyun	Democratic Party	563,507	52.53
Kim Tae-heum (incumbent)	People Power Party	509,167	47.47
Total		1,072,674	100.00
Valid votes		1,072,674	98.25
Invalid/blank votes		19,126	1.75
Total votes		1,091,800	100.00
Registered voters/turnout		1,857,239	58.79
Democratic gain from People Power			
Source: National Election Commission

=== North Jeolla ===
Incumbent governor of North Jeolla Province Kim Kwan-young, an independent, ran for re-election to a second term after being expelled from the Democratic Party, but was defeated by former National Assembly member for Gunsa–Gimje–Buan B, North Jeolla Lee Won-taeg of the Democratic Party.

Candidate	Party	Votes	%
Lee Won-taeg	Democratic Party	473,436	51.23
Kim Kwan-young (incumbent)	Independent	386,152	41.78
Yang Jeong-mu	People Power Party	38,100	4.12
Baek Seung-jae	Progressive Party	15,738	1.70
Kim Sung-soo	Independent	10,757	1.16
Total		924,183	100.00
Valid votes		924,183	97.62
Invalid/blank votes		22,517	2.38
Total votes		946,700	100.00
Registered voters/turnout		1,509,854	62.70
Democratic gain from Independent			
Source: National Election Commission

=== North Gyeongsang ===
Incumbent governor of North Gyeongsang Province Lee Cheol-woo of the People Power Party was re-elected to a third term.

Candidate	Party	Votes	%
Lee Cheol-woo (incumbent)	People Power Party	878,556	67.24
Oh Jung-ki	Democratic Party	427,956	32.76
Total		1,306,512	100.00
Valid votes		1,306,512	97.60
Invalid/blank votes		32,075	2.40
Total votes		1,338,587	100.00
Registered voters/turnout		2,202,861	60.77
People Power hold			
Source: National Election Commission

=== South Gyeongsang ===
Incumbent governor of South Gyeongsang Province Park Wan-su of the People Power Party was re-elected to a second term, defeating former governor Kim Kyoung-soo on a much reduced margin from 2022.

Candidate	Party	Votes	%
Park Wan-su (incumbent)	People Power Party	897,975	51.29
Kim Kyoung-soo	Democratic Party	852,911	48.71
Total		1,750,886	100.00
Valid votes		1,750,886	97.62
Invalid/blank votes		42,631	2.38
Total votes		1,793,517	100.00
Registered voters/turnout		2,775,745	64.61
People Power hold			
Source: National Election Commission

=== Jeju ===
Incumbent governor of Jeju Province Oh Young-hun of the Democratic Party retired. The Democratic Party nominated former National Assembly member for Seogwipo, Jeju Wi Seong-gon, who won the election.

Candidate	Party	Votes	%
Wi Seong-gon	Democratic Party	197,897	63.11
Moon Sung-yu	People Power Party	105,251	33.57
Yang Yoon-nyong	Independent	10,416	3.32
Total		313,564	100.00
Valid votes		313,564	98.30
Invalid/blank votes		5,428	1.70
Total votes		318,992	100.00
Registered voters/turnout		565,350	56.42
Democratic hold			
Source: National Election Commission

== Regional council elections ==
Party	Seats	+/–
Democratic Party	589	+267
People Power Party	327	–213
Progressive Party	7	+4
Rebuilding Korea Party	5	New
Independents	5	0
Total	933	+61
Source: National Election Commission, MBC

=== Results by province and city ===
Province/City	Seats	DPK	PPP	PP	RKP	IND
Seoul	118	80	38			
Jeonnam–Gwangju	91	83	1	5	2	
Busan	48	11	37			
Daegu	36	2	34			
Incheon	45	38	7			
Daejeon	22	20	2			
Ulsan	22	6	15	1		
Sejong	21	18	3			
Gyeonggi	167	144	22		1	
Gangwon	54	24	30			
North Chungcheong	38	27	11			
South Chungcheong	50	33	17			
North Jeolla	44	42	1		1	
North Gyeongsang	64	3	58			3
South Gyeongsang	68	23	44			1
Jeju	45	34	8	1	1	1
Total	933	589	327	7	5	5
Source: National Election Commission, MBC

=== Constituency seats ===
Province/City	Seats	DPK	PPP	PP	IND
Seoul	103	73	30		
Jeonnam–Gwangju	79	75		4	
Busan	42	8	34		
Daegu	31		31		
Incheon	39	35	4		
Daejeon	19	18	1		
Ulsan	19	5	13	1	
Sejong	18	16	2		
Gyeonggi	146	133	13		
Gangwon	47	21	26		
North Chungcheong	33	24	9		
South Chungcheong	43	29	14		
North Jeolla	38	38			
North Gyeongsang	56		53		3
South Gyeongsang	59	19	39		1
Jeju	32	27	3	1	1
Total	804	521	272	6	5
Source: National Election Commission, MBC

=== Proportional representation seats ===
Province/City	Seats	DPK	PPP	RKP	PP
Seoul	15	7	8		
Jeonnam–Gwangju	12	8	1	2	1
Busan	6	3	3		
Daegu	5	2	3		
Incheon	6	3	3		
Daejeon	3	2	1		
Ulsan	3	1	2		
Sejong	3	2	1		
Gyeonggi	21	11	9	1	
Gangwon	7	3	4		
North Chungcheong	5	3	2		
South Chungcheong	7	4	3		
North Jeolla	6	4	1	1	
North Gyeongsang	8	3	5		
South Gyeongsang	9	4	5		
Jeju	13	7	5	1	
Total	129	68	55	5	1
Source: National Election Commission, MBC

== Municipal mayoral elections ==
Party	Seats	+/–
Democratic Party	119	+56
People Power Party	95	–50
Rebuilding Korea Party	2	New
Independents	11	–6
Total	227	+1
Source: National Election Commission, Yonhap News Agency

=== Results by province or city ===
Province/City	Mayors	DPK	PPP	RKP	IND
Seoul	25	17	8		
Jeonnam–Gwangju	27	22		2	3
Busan	16	7	9		
Daegu	9		9		
Incheon	11	8	3		
Daejeon	5	5			
Ulsan	5	1	4		
Gyeonggi	31	19	12		
Gangwon	18	11	7		
North Chungcheong	11	6	5		
South Chungcheong	15	5	10		
North Jeolla	14	14			
North Gyeongsang	22		18		4
South Gyeongsang	18	4	10		4
Total	227	119	95	2	11
Source: National Election Commission, Yonhap News Agency

== Municipal council elections ==
Party	Seats	+/–
Democratic Party	1,574	+190
People Power Party	1,277	–158
Progressive Party	34	+17
Rebuilding Korea Party	32	New
Justice Party	6	–1
Reform Party	1	New
Green Party Korea	1	+1
Independents	109	–35
Total	3,034	+47
Source: National Election Commission

=== Results by province and city ===
Province/City	Seats	DPK	PPP	PP	RKP	JP	RP	GPK	IND
Seoul	436	228	203	5					
Jeonnam–Gwangju	320	250		22	16	4			28
Busan	182	81	98	2					1
Daegu	131	48	79						4
Incheon	129	71	57			1			
Daejeon	63	38	25						
Ulsan	50	24	25	1					
Gyeonggi	471	265	204	1			1		
Gangwon	177	77	97			1			2
North Chungcheong	140	74	65						1
South Chungcheong	179	88	89						2
North Jeolla	200	158		2	16				24
North Gyeongsang	284	60	191					1	32
South Gyeongsang	272	112	144	1					15
Total	3,034	1,574	1,277	34	32	6	1	1	109
Source: National Election Commission

=== Constituency seats ===
Province/City	Seats	DPK	PPP	PP	RKP	JP	RP	GPK	IND
Seoul	383	199	179	5					
Jeonnam–Gwangju	278	216		22	8	4			28
Busan	158	70	85	2					1
Daegu	114	43	67						4
Incheon	113	62	50			1			
Daejeon	56	33	23						
Ulsan	44	21	22	1					
Gyeonggi	415	235	178	1			1		
Gangwon	154	71	80			1			2
North Chungcheong	123	65	57						1
South Chungcheong	153	74	77						2
North Jeolla	175	139		2	10				24
North Gyeongsang	248	51	164					1	32
South Gyeongsang	236	97	123	1					15
Total	2,650	1,376	1,105	34	18	6	1	1	109
Source: National Election Commission

=== Proportional representation seats ===
Province/City	Seats	DPK	PPP	RKP
Seoul	53	29	24	
Jeonnam–Gwangju	42	34		8
Busan	24	11	13	
Daegu	17	5	12	
Incheon	16	9	7	
Daejeon	7	5	2	
Ulsan	6	3	3	
Gyeonggi	56	30	26	
Gangwon	23	6	17	
North Chungcheong	17	9	8	
South Chungcheong	26	14	12	
North Jeolla	25	19		6
North Gyeongsang	36	9	27	
South Gyeongsang	36	15	21	
Total	384	198	172	14
Source: National Election Commission

== Administrative controversies ==
=== 2026 ballot shortages ===
During the local elections on June 3, 2026, the National Election Commission (NEC) faced significant criticism due to a severe shortage of physical ballots at polling stations. The NEC had reduced the printing of election day ballots to approximately 50% of the registered electorate, anticipating that high early voting turnout would lower the demand on election day.

However, this calculation led to ballot depletion in 91 voting districts nationwide, including Songpa-gu, Gangnam-gu, and Gwangjin-gu in Seoul, as well as Yeonsu-gu in Incheon. Consequently, voting hours were extended past the official 6:00 PM closing time, with some polling stations in Jamsil operating until 10:00 PM as emergency ballot supplies were delivered.

=== Exit poll controversy and resignations ===
Major television networks released their exit poll projections at exactly 6:00 PM, while hundreds to thousands of voters were still waiting in lines at the extended polling stations, raising concerns regarding the potential violation of the secret ballot principle.

Following the administrative failures, a civic group filed formal complaints against top election officials for dereliction of duty, prompting the Seoul Metropolitan Police Agency to launch an investigation. On June 5, 2026, NEC Chairman Rho Tae-ak and Secretary General Heo Chul-hoon officially resigned from their positions. Kim Eun Hae, a member of the People Power Party(conservative), criticized Rho Tae-ak's resignation, stating that it did not constitute taking responsibility, as his term as NEC chairman was already ending with the election. Meanwhile, Roh Tae-ak has concurrently served as a Justice of the Supreme Court alongside his role as Chair of the NEC. Critics from opposition parties, conservative civic groups, and some political figures have argued that the current system, in which the Chair of the National Election Commission is also a Supreme Court Justice, raises concerns regarding the political neutrality of the judiciary and the independence of election administration. On June 8, Chief Justice Cho Hee-dae of the Supreme Court accepted the resignation tendered by Roh Tae-ak.

Before their resignations, the NEC issued a statement apologizing for the mismanagement but stated that the ballot shortages do not constitute a valid legal basis for re-elections. Public assemblies and citizen gatherings continued following the incident, primarily centered around the Olympic Handball Gymnasium in Jamsil, Seoul, calling for a thorough investigation into ballot shortages, a rerun of the election, transparency, and manual vote counting. The protest reportedly began on June 5 and is still ongoing.

== See also ==
- 2022 South Korean local elections
- 2025 South Korean presidential election
