= Kim Woo-nam =

South Korean politician (1955–2025)

Kim Woo-nam (Korean: 김우남; July 12, 1955 – December 11, 2025) was a South Korean politician.

== Life and career ==
Kim Woo-nam was born in Pyeongdae-ri, Jeju Island on July 12, 1955. He served as a member of the 17th, 18th, and 19th National Assembly of South Korea.

Kim died of a heart attack on December 11, 2025, at the age of 70.

== Election results ==
Year	Elections	Constituency	Political party	Votes (%)	Results
2004	17th National Assembly General Election	Jeju-Bukjeju B (Jeju)	Uri	19,053 (38.02%)	Won
2008	18th National Assembly General Election	Jeju B (Jeju)	UDP	30,170 (43.11%)	Won
2012	19th National Assembly General Election	Jeju B (Jeju)	DUP	46,236 (69.89%)	Won
2022	June 2022 By-Election	Jeju B (Jeju)	Independent	5,775 (5.43%)	Defeated

=== Local elections ===
==== Jeju Special Self-Governing Provincial Council ====
Year	Elections	Constituency	Political party	Votes (%)	Remarks
1991	1991 Iocal Election	Bukjeju 3rd (Jeju)	Independent	4,840 (44.02%)	Defeated
1995	1st Iocal Election	Bukjeju 3rd (Jeju)	Independent	4,504 (38.94%)	Defeated
1998	3rd Iocal Election	Bukjeju 3rd (Jeju)	NCNP	9,227 (44.74%)	Won
2002	3rd Iocal Election	Bukjeju 3rd (Jeju)	MDP	11,825 (55.83%)	Won
