= 2016 Saenuri Party leadership election =

South Korean party election

← 2014	9 August 2016	2017 (LKP) →
Candidate	Lee Jung-hyun	Joo Ho-young
Points	44,421	31,946
Candidate	Lee Ju-young	Han Sun-kyo
Points	21,614	10,757
Leader before election
Kim Hee-ok (Acting)
Elected Leader
Lee Jung-hyun

The Saenuri Party held a leadership election on 9 August 2016. The election was to elect a new party leader after the 2016 legislative election defeat.

The new leader, Lee Jung-Hyun, was the first leader from the Honam region in the history of South Korean conservative parties.

== Candidates ==
=== Running ===
- Lee Jung-hyun, member of the National Assembly.
- Lee Ju-young, member of the National Assembly, former Minister of Oceans and Fisheries.
- Joo Ho-young, member of the National Assembly, former Minister without portfolio.
- Han Sun-kyo, member of the National Assembly.

=== Withdrew ===
- Choung Byoung-gug, member of the National Assembly, former Minister of Culture, Sports and Tourism.

== Results ==
Final results
Candidate	Delegates	Opinion poll	Total points
Lee Jung-hyun	Unknown	Unknown	44,421 (40.9%)
Joo Ho-young	Unknown	Unknown	31,946 (29.4%)
Lee Ju-young	Unknown	Unknown	21,614 (19.9%)
Han Sun-kyo	Unknown	Unknown	10,757 (9.9%)
Total	—	—	108,738
