= Lee Cheol-woo =

Governor of North Gyeongsang Province since 2018

- 이철우
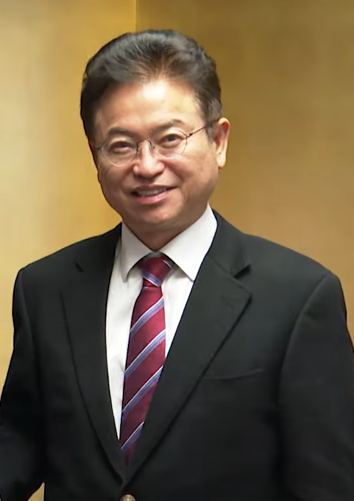

Governor of North Gyeongsang Province
- Incumbent
- Assumed office 1 July 2018
- Preceded by: Kim Kwan-yong

Member of the National Assembly
- In office 30 May 2008 – 14 May 2018
- Preceded by: Lim In-bae
- Succeeded by: Song Eon-seok
- Constituency: Gimcheon (North Gyeongsang)

Personal details
- Born: 15 August 1955 (age 71) Gimcheon, South Korea
- Party: People Power
- Other political affiliations: Liberty Korea
- Education: Kyungpook National University; Yonsei University
- Occupation: Politician

Korean name
- Hangul: 이철우
- Hanja: 李喆雨
- RR: I Cheolu
- MR: I Ch'ŏru

Lee Cheol-woo (Korean: 이철우; born 15 August 1955), also spelled Lee Cheol-uoo, is a South Korean politician who has served as the governor of North Gyeongsang Province since 2018. A member of the People Power Party, he was a member of the National Assembly of South Korea from 2008 to 2018 and the vice-governor of North Gyeongsang Province from 2005 to 2008.

== Personal life ==
Lee was born in Gimcheon, North Gyeongsang Province, South Korea. He attended Kyungpook National University, where he majored in mathematics education. He also graduated from the Graduate School of Public Administration at the Yonsei University, and was awarded an honorary doctorate of management by Daegu University in August 2007.

== Career ==
Lee served as a member and manager of the National Intelligence Service for more than 20 years before becoming vice-governor. He spent almost five years as a teacher in various middle schools before joining the NIS.

In the National Assembly, he was a member of the Intelligence Committee, Committee of Education, Science and Technology and the Special Committee of Budget and Account.

In April 2025, Lee registered his candidacy for the 2025 South Korean presidential election, but lost in the primaries held by the People Power Party.

== Election results ==
=== General elections ===
Year	Elections	Constituency	Political party	Votes (%)	Results
2008	18th National Assembly General Election	Gimcheon (North Gyeongsang)	GNP	35,933 (53.37%)	Won
2012	19th National Assembly General Election	Gimcheon (North Gyeongsang)	Saenuri	49,909 (83.45%)	Won
2016	20th National Assembly General Election	Gimcheon (North Gyeongsang)	Saenuri	42,340 (64.25%)	Won

=== Local elections ===
==== Governor of North Gyeongsang ====
Year	Elections	Constituency	Political party	Votes (%)	Remarks
2018	7th Iocal Election	North Gyeongsang (Governoral Elections)	LKP	732,785 (52.11%)	Won
2022	8th Iocal Election	North Gyeongsang (Governoral Elections)	PPP	904,675 (77.95%)	Won
2026	9th Iocal Election	North Gyeongsang (Governoral Elections)	PPP	878,556 (67.24%)	Won
