= Kim Wan-ju =

South Korean politician

- 김완주
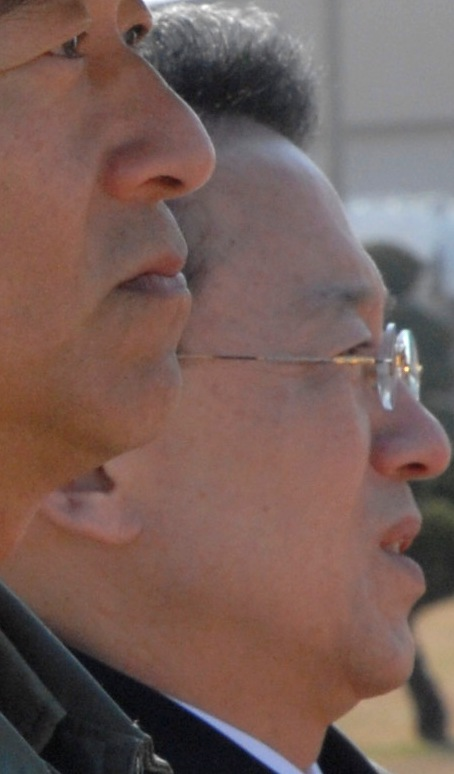
- Kim in March 2010 (right)

32nd Governor of North Jeolla Province
- In office July 1, 2006 – June 30, 2014
- Preceded by: Kang Hyun-wook
- Succeeded by: Song Ha-jin

Mayor of the City of Jeonju
- In office July 1, 1998 – March 10, 2006
- Preceded by: Yang Sang-lyeol
- Succeeded by: Lee Kyung-ok (acting)

Personal details
- Born: May 25, 1946 (age 80) Wanju County, southern Korea
- Party: Korean Democratic
- Education: University of Pennsylvania
- Occupation: Politician

Kim Wan-ju (Korean: 김완주; born May 25, 1946) is a South Korean politician who was the 32nd governor of the South Korean province of North Jeolla from 2006 to 2014; he was also the mayor of the South Korean city of Jeonju from 1998 to 2006. During his tenure, Kim was a strong proponent of regional development, historical preservation and new paradigms of local and decentralized government.

== Early life and education ==
Kim was born in what is now North Jeolla Province's Wanju County in May 1946. He graduated from the Jeonju Nam-jung School in 1962 and graduated from Jeonju High School in 1965. He received a Bachelor's in Political Science from Seoul National University (SNU) in 1970 and graduated from SNU's Graduate School of Public Administration in 1963. In 1987, he received a Master's in Urban Planning from the University of Pennsylvania in the U.S.

== Career ==
- Passed the 14th Administrative Examination in 1973
- 1974–1980: Chonbuk Provincial Planning Division Manager
- 1980–1981: Chonbuk Provincial Office Deputy Director-General
- 1988–1988: Planning Officer, Chonbuk Provincial Office
- 1991–1992: Presidential Office of the President
- 1994: Representative of Namwon's mayor in North Jeolla Province
- 1994–1995: The 7th and 8th North Jeolla Province Namwon Market
- 1995–1996: Chief of Planning and Management of North Jeolla Province
- 1998: Director of the Korea Sports Council
- July 1, 1998 – March 10, 2006: Mayor of the City of Jeonju (re-election)
  - 2001–2004 Member of Local Transportation Committee
  - 2003: Chairperson of the Decentralization Special Promotion Committee
  - 2003: Chairman of the Council of the Mayor of the Mayor of the National Market
- July 1, 2006 – June 30, 2014: 32nd Governor of North Jeolla Province do in 33rd (re-election)

== Personal life ==
Kim is a member of the Gwangsan Kim clan.

== Election results ==
=== Local elections ===
==== Governor of North Jeolla ====
Year	Elections	Constituency	Political party	Votes (%)	Results
2006	4th Iocal Election	North Jeolla (Governoral Elections)	Uri	389,436 (48.08%)	Won
2010	5th Iocal Election	North Jeolla (Governoral Elections)	Democratic	569,980 (68.67%)	Won

==== Mayor of North Jeolla Jeonju ====
Year	Elections	Constituency	Political party	Votes (%)	Remarks
1998	2nd Iocal Election	Mayor of North Jeolla Jeonju	NCNP	135,311 (83.62%)	Won
2002	3rd Iocal Election	Mayor of North Jeolla Jeonju	MDP	126,733 (71.63%)	Won

Political offices
Preceded by Kang Hyun-wook	Governor of North Jeolla Province; 2006–2014	Succeeded by Song Ha-jin
Preceded by Yang Sang-lyeol	Mayor of Jeonju; 1998–2006	Succeeded by Lee Kyung-ok (acting)
