= Lee Jang-woo (politician) =

South Korean politician (born 1965)

- 이장우
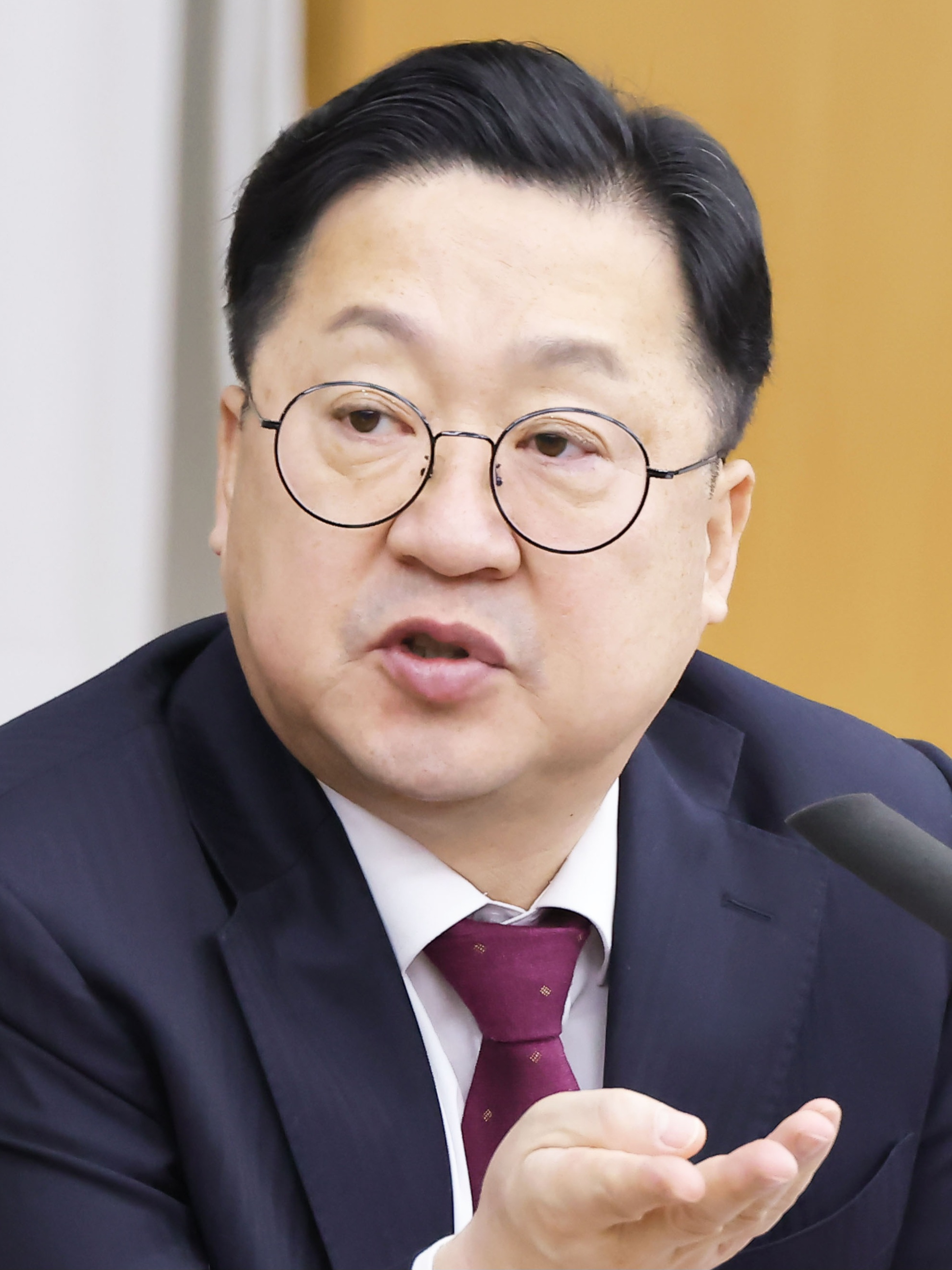
- Lee in 2025

13th Mayor of Daejeon
- In office 1 July 2022 – 30 June 2026
- Preceded by: Heo Tae-jeong
- Succeeded by: Heo Tae-jeong

Member of the National Assembly
- In office 30 May 2012 – 29 May 2020
- Preceded by: lm Yeong-ho
- Succeeded by: Jang Chul-min
- Constituency: Dong (Daejeon)

Mayor of the Dong
- In office 1 July 2006 – 30 June 2010
- Preceded by: Park Byung-ho
- Succeeded by: Han Hyeon-tak

Personal details
- Born: 10 February 1965 (age 61) Cheongyang County, South Chungcheong Province
- Party: People Power

Korean name
- Hangul: 이장우
- Hanja: 李莊雨
- RR: I Jangu
- MR: I Changu

Lee Jang-woo (Korean: 이장우; born 10 February 1965) is a South Korean politician who served as the Mayor of Daejeon from 2022 to 2026.

== Career ==
Lee Jang-woo is from Cheongyang County, South Chungcheong Province, and graduated from the Department of Public Administration at Daejeon University. After graduating from the university, he founded and operated a computer company, then he entered politics and served as a member of the 19th and 20th National Assembly and the mayor of Dong District, Daejeon.

In the 2022 local elections, Lee was elected Mayor of Daejeon for the first time in eight years as a conservative party candidate. In April 2025, Lee declared at a press conference that he would not run in the 2025 presidential election.

== Election results ==
=== General elections ===
Year	Elections	Constituency	Political party	Votes (%)	Results
2012	19th National Assembly General Election	Dong (Daejeon)	Saenuri	36,780 (34.97%)	Won
2016	20th National Assembly General Election	Dong (Daejeon)	Saenuri	47,514 (44.05%)	Won
2020	21st National Assembly General Election	Dong (Daejeon)	UFP	57,194 (47.56%)	Defeated (2nd)

=== Local elections ===
==== Mayor of Daejeon ====
Year	Elections	Constituency	Political party	Votes (%)	Remarks
2022	8th Iocal Election	Daejeon (Mayoral Elections)	PPP	310,035 (51.19%)	Won
2026	9th Iocal Election	Daejeon (Mayoral Elections)	PPP	325,589 (44.15%)	Defeated (2nd)

==== Mayor of Daejeon Dong ====
Year	Elections	Constituency	Political party	Votes (%)	Remarks
2004	2004 By-election	Mayor of Daejeon Dong	Independent	4,171 (11.00%)	Defeated (4th)
2006	4th Iocal Election	Mayor of Daejeon Dong	GNP	35,853 (41.45%)	Won
2010	5th Iocal Election	Mayor of Daejeon Dong	GNP	30,633 (31.86%)	Defeated (2nd)
