= Kang Hyun-wook =

South Korean politician (born 1938)

- 강현욱

24th and 31st Governor of North Jeolla Province
- In office 1 July 2002 – 30 June 2006
- Preceded by: Yoo Jong-geun
- Succeeded by: Kim Wan-ju
- In office 20 May 1988 – 20 June 1990
- Preceded by: Hong Suk-pyo
- Succeeded by: Choe Yong-bok

9th South Korean Minister of the Environment
- In office 20 December 1996 – 6 August 1997
- Preceded by: Jeong Jong-taek
- Succeeded by: Yun Yoon-joon

15th and 16th South Korean National Assemblyman representing Gunsan
- In office 30 May 2000 – 30 June 2002
- Preceded by: Kang Hyun-wook
- Succeeded by: Kang Bong-gyun
- In office 30 May 1996 – 29 May 2000
- Preceded by: Chae Yeong-seog
- Succeeded by: Kang Hyun-wook

42nd South Korean Minister of Agriculture, Forestry, and Fisheries
- In office 31 March 1992 – 25 February 1993
- Preceded by: Cho Kyong-sik
- Succeeded by: Heo Sin-haeng

Personal details
- Born: 27 March 1938 (age 88) Gunsan, Korea, Empire of Japan
- Party: Independent; Millennium Democratic; Democratic Liberal
- Education: Seoul National University

Kang Hyun-wook (Korean: 강현욱; Hanja: 姜賢旭; born 27 March 1938) is a South Korean politician who served as the governor of North Jeolla Province from May 1988 to June 1990 and then again from July 2002 to June 2006. He also served as South Korea's Minister of Agriculture, Forestry, and Fisheries from 1992 to 1993, as South Korea's Minister of the Environment from 1996 to 1997, and as the South Korean National Assemblyman representing Gunsan from May 1996 to June 2002.

== Early life and education ==
Kang was born in March 1938 in what is now Gunsan, South Korea. He graduated from Gunsan Middle School in 1954 and Gunsan High School in 1957. He received a bachelor's degree in Foreign Studies from the Seoul National University in 1961.

== Career ==
Kang has served as a Vice Minister of Economic Planning, Vice Minister of MOCIE.

From December 1996 to August 1997, Kang was South Korea's Minister of the Environment.

From 1992 to 1993, Kang was South Korea's Minister of Agriculture, Forestry, and Fisheries.

From May 1996 to June 2002, Kang was the 15th and 16th National Assemblyman representing Gunsan.

From 1988 to 1990 and then again from July 2002 to June 2006, Kang was the governor of North Jeolla Province.

== Personal life ==
Kang is Catholic and he was baptized as Paul.

== Election results ==
=== General elections ===
Year	Elections	Constituency	Political party	Votes (%)	Results
1992	14th National Assembly General Election	Gunsan (North Jeolla)	DLP	33,011 (36.89%)	Defeated (2nd)
1996	15th National Assembly General Election	Gunsan B (North Jeolla)	NKP	36,100 (53.78%)	Won
2000	16th National Assembly General Election	Gunsan (North Jeolla)	MDP	76,151 (68.66%)	Won
2008	18th National Assembly General Election	Gunsan (North Jeolla)	Independent	38,427 (40.66%)	Defeated (2nd)

=== Local elections ===
==== Governor of North Jeolla ====
Year	Elections	Constituency	Political party	Votes (%)	Remarks
1995	1st Iocal Election	North Jeolla (Governoral Elections)	DLP	319,452 (32.84%)	Defeated (2nd)
2002	3rd Iocal Election	North Jeolla (Governoral Elections)	MDP	671,650 (74.56%)	Won

Political offices
Preceded by Yoo Jong-geun	Governor of North Jeolla Province; 2002–2006	Succeeded by Kim Wan-ju
Preceded by Jong Jong-taek	South Korean Minister of the Environment; 1996–1997	Succeeded by Yun Yoon-joon
Preceded by Cho Kyong-sik	South Korean Minister of Agriculture, Forestry, and Fisheries; 1992–1993	Succeeded by Heo Sin-haeng
