= Heo Tae-jeong =

South Korean politician (born 1965)

- 허태정
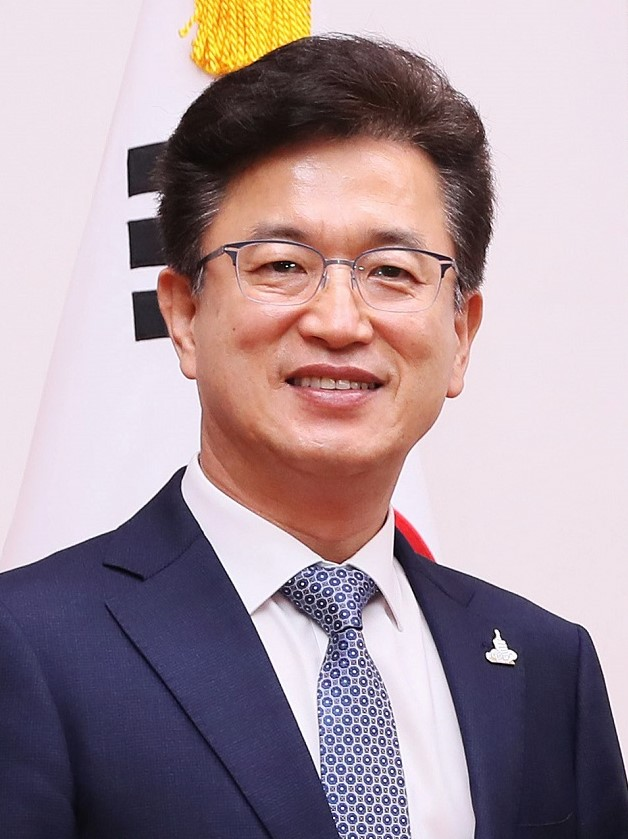
- Heo in 2020

Mayor of Daejeon
- Incumbent
- Assumed office 1 July 2026
- Preceded by: Lee Jang-woo
- In office 1 July 2018 – 30 June 2022
- Preceded by: Kwon Sun-taek
- Succeeded by: Lee Jang-woo

Mayor of the Yuseong
- In office 1 July 2010 – 12 February 2018
- Preceded by: Jin Dong-gyu
- Succeeded by: Jeong Yong-rae

Personal details
- Born: 12 September 1965 (age 61) Yesan, South Chungcheong Province, South Korea
- Party: Democratic
- Education: Chungnam National University
- Website: happytj.co.kr

Korean name
- Hangul: 허태정
- Hanja: 許泰鋌
- RR: Heo Taejeong
- MR: Hŏ T'aejŏng

Heo Tae-jeong (Korean: 허태정; born 12 September 1965) is a South Korean politician who has served as the Mayor of Daejeon since 2026. A member of the Democratic Party of Korea (DPK), he previously served in the office from 2018 to 2022.

== Biography ==
Heo Tae-jeong was born in Yesan County, South Chungcheong Province in 1965. He participated in a student movement while attending Chungnam National University.

Heo was appointed by President Roh Moo-hyun and served as a personnel administrator and social administrator of Blue House. And he served as policy advisor to Science and Technology Minister Oh Myeong.

Heo was elected as the head of the Yuseong District Office in 2010 and the mayor of Daejeon in 2018.

== Election results ==
==== Mayor of Daejeon ====
Year	Elections	Constituency	Political party	Votes (%)	Remarks
2018	7th Iocal Election	Daejeon (Mayoral Elections)	Democratic (2015)	393,354 (56.41%)	Won
2022	8th Iocal Election	Daejeon (Mayoral Elections)	Democratic (2015)	295,555 (48.80%)	Defeated (2nd)
2026	9th Iocal Election	Daejeon (Mayoral Elections)	Democratic (2015)	394,391 (53.48%)	Won

==== Mayor of Daejeon Yuseong ====
Year	Elections	Constituency	Political party	Votes (%)	Remarks
2010	5th Iocal Election	Mayor of Daejeon Yuseong	Democratic (2008)	44,909 (41.86%)	Won
2014	6th Iocal Election	Mayor of Daejeon Yuseong	NCNP	83,441 (60.67%)	Won
