= Jeju B =

- Single-member constituency for the National Assembly
- Location of the constituency
- District(s): Jeju City (part)
- Region: Jeju Province
- Electorate: 171,373 (2016)

Current constituency
- Created: 2008
- Seats: 1
- Party: Democratic Party
- Member: Kim Han-kyu
- Council constituency: 1st district 2nd district 3rd district 4th district 5th district 6th district 8th district 9th district 17th district 18th district
- Created from: Jeju–Bukjeju A Jeju–Bukjeju B

Jeju B (Korean: 제주시 을) is a constituency of the National Assembly of South Korea. The constituency consists of part of Jeju City. As of 2016, 171,373 eligible voters were registered in the constituency.

== List of members of the National Assembly ==
Election	Member	Party	Dates	Notes
2008	Kim Woo-nam	United Democratic	2008–2016	
2012	Kim Woo-nam	Democratic United	2008–2016	
2016	Oh Young-hun	Democratic	2016–2022	Resigned on 29 April 2022 to run for Governor of Jeju Province; Governor of Jeju Province (2022–2026)
2020	Oh Young-hun	Democratic	2016–2022	Resigned on 29 April 2022 to run for Governor of Jeju Province; Governor of Jeju Province (2022–2026)
2022 by-election	Kim Han-kyu	Democratic	2022–present	Secretary for Political Affairs (2021–2022)
2024	Kim Han-kyu	Democratic	2022–present	Secretary for Political Affairs (2021–2022)

== Election results ==
=== 2024 ===
Legislative Election 2024: Jeju B
Party	Candidate	Votes	%	±%
Democratic	Kim Han-kyu	78,774	64.64	▲15.23
People Power	Kim Seung-wook	38,948	31.96	▼13.18
Green Justice	Kang Soon-ah	4,139	3.39	new
Rejected ballots		1,393	–	
Turnout		123,254	63.22	▲7.81
Registered electors		194,949		
Democratic hold		Swing		

=== 2022 by-election ===
By-election 2022: Jeju B
Party	Candidate	Votes	%	±%
Democratic	Kim Han-kyu	52,490	49.41	▼5.94
People Power	Bu Sang-il	47,954	45.14	▲4.08
Independent	Kim Woo-nam	5,775	5.43	new
Rejected ballots		1,563	–	
Turnout		107,782	55.41	▼8.64
Registered electors		194,534		
Democratic hold		Swing		

=== 2020 ===
Legislative Election 2020: Jeju B
Party	Candidate	Votes	%	±%
Democratic	Oh Young-hun	67,206	55.4	+10.2
People Power	Bu Sang-il	49,862	41.1	−1.1
Minjung	Kang Eun-ju	3,244	2.7	new
Others	—	1,100	0.9	new
Rejected ballots		–	–	–
Turnout		121,412	63.3	+13.3
Registered electors		191,862		
Democratic hold		Swing		

=== 2016 ===
Legislative Election 2016: Jeju B
Party	Candidate	Votes	%	±%
Democratic	Oh Young-hun	44,338	45.2	−24.7
Saenuri	Bu Sang-il	41,456	42.3	+24.4
People	Oh Soo-yong	11,467	11.7	new
Hannara	Cha Ju-hong	834	0.9	new
Rejected ballots		1,334	–	–
Turnout		99,429	58.0	+10.6
Registered electors		171,373		
Democratic hold		Swing		

=== 2012 ===
Legislative Election 2012: Jeju B
Party	Candidate	Votes	%	±%
Democratic United	Kim Woo-nam	46,236	69.9	+26.8
Liberty Forward	Kang Jung-hee	11,856	17.9	+11.0
New Progressive	Jeon Woo-hong	8,056	12.2	new
Rejected ballots		3,594	–	–
Turnout		69,742	47.4	−4.5
Registered electors		147,060		
Democratic United hold		Swing		

=== 2008 ===
Legislative Election 2008: Jeju B
Party	Candidate	Votes	%	±%
United Democratic	Kim Woo-nam	30,170	43.1	new
Grand National	Bu Sang-il	26,474	37.8	new
Liberty Forward	Kang Chang-jae	4,811	6.9	new
Democratic Labor	Kim Hyo-sang	4,578	6.5	new
Pro-Park	Kim Chang-uop	3,080	4.4	new
Family Federation	Kim Chang-jin	863	1.2	new
Rejected ballots		599	–	–
Turnout		70,575	51.9	
Registered electors		136,099		
United Democratic win (new seat)				

== See also ==
- List of constituencies of the National Assembly of South Korea
