= Governor of Jeonbuk State =

Local government head in South Korea

- 전북특별자치도지사
- Seal of Jeonbuk State

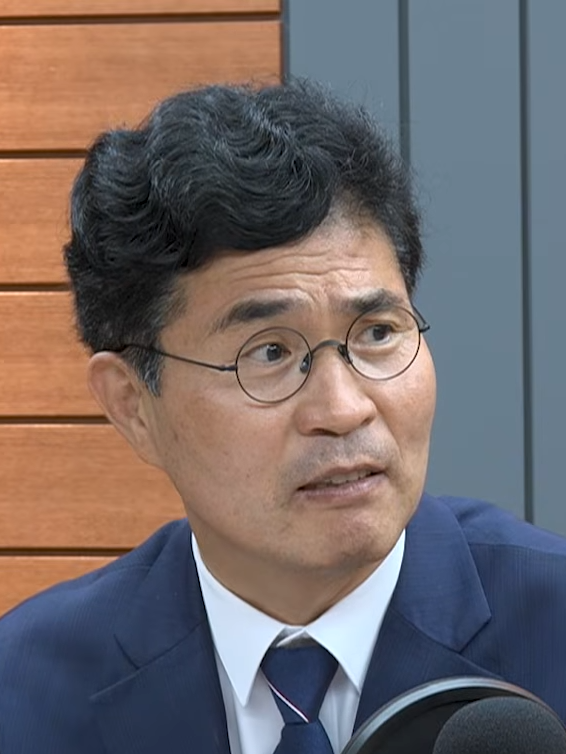
- Incumbent; Lee Won-taeg since 1 July 2026
- Term length: Four years
- Inaugural holder: Chung Il-sa
- Formation: 4 April 1946; 80 years ago

The Governor of Jeonbuk State (Korean: 전북특별자치도지사; Hanja: 全北特別自治道知事) is the head of the local government of Jeonbuk State who is elected to a four-year term.

== List of governors ==
=== Appointed governors (before 1995) ===
From 1946 to 1995, the Governor of North Jeolla Province was appointed by the President of the Republic of Korea.

=== Directly elected governors (1995–present) ===
Since 1995, under provisions of the revised Local Government Act, the Governor of North Jeolla Province is elected by direct election.

Title of the Governor of North Jeollla Province was changed to the Governor of Jeonbuk State on 18 January 2024.

Political parties
Liberal

Term	Portrait	Name (Birth–Death)	Term of office			Political party	Elected
Term	Portrait	Name (Birth–Death)	Took office	Left office	Time in office	Political party	Elected
1st		Yu Jong-geun 유종근 柳鍾根 (born 1944)	1 July 1995	30 June 2002	7 years, 0 days	Democratic → National Congress → Millennium Democratic	1995
2nd		Yu Jong-geun 유종근 柳鍾根 (born 1944)	1 July 1995	30 June 2002	7 years, 0 days	Democratic → National Congress → Millennium Democratic	1998
3rd		Kang Hyun-wook 강현욱 姜賢旭 (born 1938)	1 July 2002	30 June 2006	4 years, 0 days	Millennium Democratic → Uri	2002
4th		Kim Wan-ju 김완주 金完柱 (born 1946)	1 July 2006	30 June 2014	8 years, 0 days	Uri → United New Democratic → Democratic ('08) → Democratic United → Democratic ('11) → NPAD	2006
5th		Kim Wan-ju 김완주 金完柱 (born 1946)	1 July 2006	30 June 2014	8 years, 0 days	Uri → United New Democratic → Democratic ('08) → Democratic United → Democratic ('11) → NPAD	2010
6th		Song Ha-jin 송하진 宋河珍 (born 1952)	1 July 2014	30 June 2022	8 years, 0 days	NPAD → Democratic	2014
7th		Song Ha-jin 송하진 宋河珍 (born 1952)	1 July 2014	30 June 2022	8 years, 0 days	NPAD → Democratic	2018
8th		Kim Kwan-young 김관영 金寬永 (born 1969)	1 July 2022	30 June 2026	4 years, 0 days	Democratic	2022
9th		Lee Won-taeg 이원택 李元澤 (born 1970)	1 July 2026	Incumbent	126 days	Democratic	2026

== Elections ==
=== 1995 ===
1995 North Jeolla gubernatorial election
Party	#	Candidate	Votes	Percentage
Democratic	2	Yu Jong-geun	653,295	67.15%
Democratic Liberal	1	Kang Hyun-wook	319,452	32.84%
Total			972,747	100.00%
Voter turnout			73.66%	

=== 1998 ===
1998 North Jeolla gubernatorial election
Party	#	Candidate	Votes	Percentage
National Congress	2	Yu Jong-geun	758,141	100.00%
Total			758,141	100.00%
Voter turnout			57.78%	

=== 2002 ===
2002 North Jeolla gubernatorial election
Party	#	Candidate	Votes	Percentage
Millennium Democratic	2	Kang Hyun-wook	571,650	74.56%
Independent	3	Son Ju-hang	131,320	17.12%
Grand National	1	Ra Kyung-kyun	63,661	8.30%
Total			766,631	100.00%
Voter turnout			54.98%	

=== 2006 ===
2006 North Jeolla gubernatorial election
Party	#	Candidate	Votes	Percentage
Uri	1	Kim Wan-ju	389,436	48.08%
Democratic	3	Chung Kyun-hwan	295,891	36.53%
Grand National	2	Moon Yong-ju	62,922	7.76%
Democratic Labor	4	Yeom Kyung-suk	61,672	7.61%
Total			809,921	100.00%
Voter turnout			57.87%	

=== 2010 ===
2010 North Jeolla gubernatorial election
Party	#	Candidate	Votes	Percentage
Democratic	2	Kim Wan-ju	569,980	68.67%
Grand National	1	Chung Woon-chun	151,064	18.20%
Democratic Labor	5	Ha Yeon-ho	52,331	6.30%
New Progressive	7	Yeom Kyung-suk	35,565	4.28%
Peace Democratic	8	Kim Dae-sik	20,990	2.52%
Total			829,930	100.00%
Voter turnout			59.34%	

=== 2014 ===
2014 North Jeolla gubernatorial election
Party	#	Candidate	Votes	Percentage
NPAD	2	Song Ha-jin	599,654	69.23%
Saenuri	1	Park Chul-gon	177,172	20.45%
Unified Progressive	3	Lee Kwang-seok	89,337	10.31%
Total			866,163	100.00%
Voter turnout			59.87%	

=== 2018 ===
2018 North Jeolla gubernatorial election
Party	#	Candidate	Votes	Percentage
Democratic	1	Song Ha-jin	682,042	70.57%
Democracy and Peace	4	Lim Chung-yeop	184,728	19.11%
Justice	5	Kwon Tae-hong	52,496	5.43%
Liberty Korea	2	Shin Jae-bong	26,374	2.72%
Minjung	6	Lee Kwang-seok	20,827	2.15%
Total			966,467	100.00%
Voter turnout			65.23%	

=== 2022 ===
2022 North Jeolla gubernatorial election
Party	#	Candidate	Votes	Percentage
Democratic	1	Kim Kwan-young	591,510	82.11%
People Power	2	Cho Bae-sook	128,828	17.88%
Total			720,338	100.00%
Voter turnout			48.65%	

=== 2026 ===
Candidate	Party	Votes	%
Lee Won-taeg	Democratic Party	473,436	51.23
Kim Kwan-young (incumbent)	Independent	386,152	41.78
Yang Jeong-mu	People Power Party	38,100	4.12
Baek Seung-jae	Progressive Party	15,738	1.70
Kim Sung-soo	Independent	10,757	1.16
Total		924,183	100.00
Valid votes		924,183	97.62
Invalid/blank votes		22,517	2.38
Total votes		946,700	100.00
Registered voters/turnout		1,509,854	62.70
Democratic gain from Independent			

== See also ==
- Government of South Korea
- Politics of South Korea
