= Kim Kwan-yong =

South Korean politician (born 1942)

- 김관용
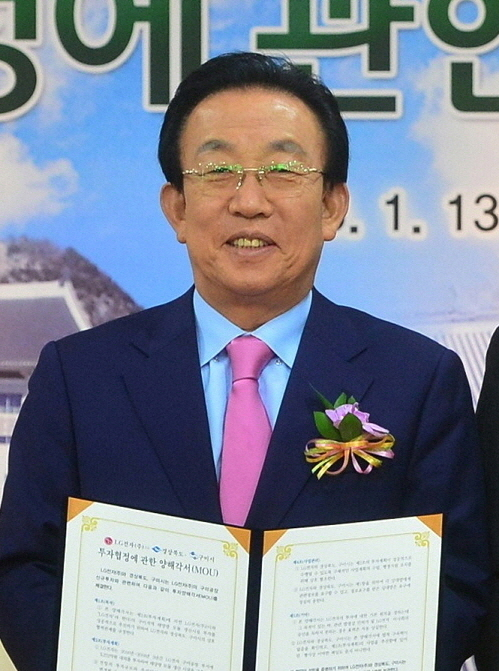
- Kim Kwan-yong in Jan 2016

Vice Chair of the Peaceful Unification Advisory Council
- In office 11 October 2022 – 31 August 2025
- President: Yoon Suk Yeol; Han Duck-soo (acting); Choi Sang-mok (acting); Han Duck-soo (acting); Lee Ju-ho (acting); Lee Jae Myung
- Preceded by: Lee Seok-hyun
- Succeeded by: Lee Hae-chan

Governor of North Gyeongsang Province
- In office 1 July 2006 – 30 June 2018
- Preceded by: Lee Eui-geun
- Succeeded by: Lee Cheol-woo

- Kim Kwan-yong
- Hangul: 김관용
- Hanja: 金寬容
- RR: Gim Gwanyong
- MR: Kim Kwanyong

Kim Kwan-yong (Korean: 김관용; born November 29, 1942) is a South Korean politician who served as the governor of North Gyeongsang Province from 2006 to 2018 and as the vice chair of the Peaceful Unification Advisory Council from 2022 to 2025. He was also the mayor of Gumi from 1995 to 1997, serving again in 2006. He is a member of the Grand National Party.

== Education ==
He graduated from Daegu Teachers' School in 1961. He received his BS in Economics from Yeungnam University in 1969. He received an honorary Doctorate of Engineering from Kumoh National Institute of Technology in 1998. He received a master's degree from the Graduate School in public administration of Yeungnam University in 2001.

== Career ==
From 1961 to 1967 Kim worked as an elementary school teacher in Gumi, Gyeongsangbuk-do. In 1989 he became Superintendent of Gumi Tax Office. From 1991 to 1993 he was an Administrative Officer(Secy) to the President for civil affairs. In 1995 he was elected Mayor of Gumi, serving until 1997, and then later again in 2006. In 1999 he was appointed Honorary Professor of Shenyang Industry University in China. On 1 July 2006 he became the 29th Governor of the Province of Gyeongsangbuk-do. In 2010 he was reelected as Gyeongsangbuk-do(North Gyeongsang Province) governor, with 75.4% of the vote. On 2 June 2010 he was reelected again. On 1 July 2010 he was sworn in as Governor of Gyeongsangbuk-do at the Inauguration Ceremony of the EXPO Park in Gyeongju.

== Election results ==
=== Governor of Gyeongsang ===
Year	Elections	Constituency	Political party	Votes (%)	Remarks
2006	4th Iocal Election	North Gyeongsang (Governoral Elections)	GNP	961,363 (76.80%)	Won
2010	5th Iocal Election	North Gyeongsang (Governoral Elections)	GNP	913,812 (75.36%)	Won
2014	6th Iocal Election	North Gyeongsang (Governoral Elections)	Saenuri	986,989 (77.73%)	Won

=== Mayor of North Gyeongsang Gumi ===
Year	Elections	Constituency	Political party	Votes (%)	Remarks
1995	1st Iocal Election	Mayor of North Gyeongsang Gumi	DLP	46,130 (35.10%)	Won
1998	2nd Iocal Election	Mayor of North Gyeongsang Gumi	GNP	93,063 (100.00%)	Won
2002	3rd Iocal Election	Mayor of North Gyeongsang Gumi	GNP	66,059 (66.40%)	Won

== Honours ==
- 1998 Awarded the Konrad Adnauer Self-Governing Organization Prize
- 2000 Awarded the 7th BPW Gold Award from Business & Professional Women's Clubs of Korea
- 2003 Awarded for excellence in local self-government management from KMA
- 2004 Awarded the Grand Prix in leadership category at the national productivity innovation competition
