= Mayor of Daejeon =

- 대전광역시장
- Seal of Daejeon

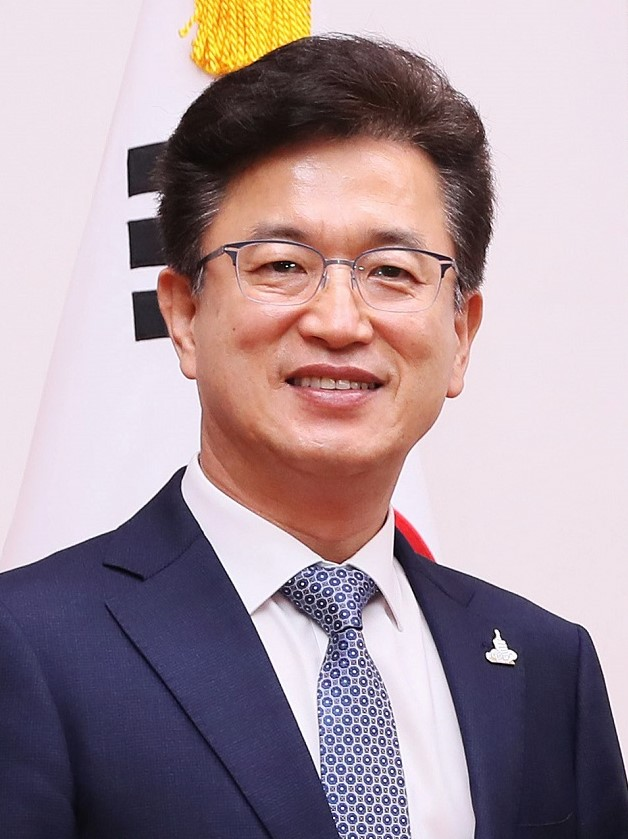
- Incumbent; Heo Tae-jeong since 1 July 2026
- Term length: Four years
- Inaugural holder: Hwang In-shik
- Formation: 16 August 1945; 81 years ago

The Mayor of Daejeon (Korean: 대전광역시장; Hanja: 大田廣域市長) is the head of the local government of Daejeon who is elected to a four-year term.

== List of mayors ==
=== Appointed mayors (before 1995) ===
From 1945 to 1995, the Mayor of Daejeon was appointed by the President of the Republic of Korea.

=== Directly elected mayors (1995–present) ===
Since 1995, under provisions of the revised Local Government Act, the Mayor of Daejeon is elected by direct election.

Political parties
Conservative
Liberal
Independent
Status
Denotes acting mayor

Term	Portrait	Name (Birth–Death)	Term of office			Political party	Elected
Term	Portrait	Name (Birth–Death)	Took office	Left office	Time in office	Political party	Elected
1st		Hong Sun-ki 홍선기 洪善基 (1936–2025)	1 July 1995	30 June 2002	7 years, 0 days	United Liberal Democrats	1995
2nd		Hong Sun-ki 홍선기 洪善基 (1936–2025)	1 July 1995	30 June 2002	7 years, 0 days	United Liberal Democrats	1998
3rd		Yeom Hong-cheol 염홍철 廉弘喆 (born 1944)	1 July 2002	30 June 2006	4 years, 0 days	Grand National → Uri	2002
4th		Park Sung-hyo 박성효 朴城孝 (born 1955)	1 July 2006	30 June 2010	4 years, 0 days	Grand National	2006
5th		Yeom Hong-cheol 염홍철 廉弘喆 (born 1944)	1 July 2010	30 June 2014	4 years, 0 days	Liberty Forward → Saenuri	2010
6th		Kwon Sun-taek 권선택 權善宅 (born 1957)	1 July 2014	14 November 2017	3 years, 137 days	NPAD → Democratic	2014
6th		Lee Jae-gwan 이재관 李在官 (born 1965); Acting	14 November 2017	30 June 2018	229 days	Independent	—
7th		Heo Tae-jeong 허태정 許泰鋌 (born 1965)	1 July 2018	30 June 2022	4 years, 0 days	Democratic	2018
8th		Lee Jang-woo 이장우 李莊雨 (born 1965)	1 July 2022	30 June 2026	4 years, 0 days	People Power	2022
9th		Heo Tae-jeong 허태정 許泰鋌 (born 1965)	1 July 2026	Incumbent	135 days	Democratic	2026

== Elections ==
=== 1995 ===
1995 Daejeon mayoral election
Party	#	Candidate	Votes	Percentage
United Liberal Democrats	3	Hong Sun-ki	342,959	63.76%
Democratic Liberal	1	Yeom Hong-cheol	112,607	20.93%
Democratic	2	Pyon Pyung-sup	58,346	10.84%
Independent	4	Lee Dae-hyung	23,953	4.45%
Total			537,865	100.00%
Voter turnout			66.93%	

=== 1998 ===
1998 Daejeon mayoral election
Party	#	Candidate	Votes	Percentage
United Liberal Democrats	3	Hong Sun-ki	286,255	73.68%
New National	4	Song Chun-young	70,414	18.12%
Independent	5	Cho Myung-hyun	31,796	8.18%
Total			388,465	100.00%
Voter turnout			44.45%	

=== 2002 ===
2002 Daejeon mayoral election
Party	#	Candidate	Votes	Percentage
Grand National	1	Yeom Hong-cheol	191,832	46.61%
United Liberal Democrats	3	Hong Sun-ki	165,426	40.20%
Independent	5	Chung Ha-yong	38,445	9.34%
Independent	4	Kim Heon-tae	15,780	3.83%
Total			411,483	100.00%
Voter turnout			42.32%	

=== 2006 ===
2006 Daejeon mayoral election
Party	#	Candidate	Votes	Percentage
Grand National	2	Park Sung-hyo	231,489	43.83%
Uri	1	Yeom Hong-cheol	217,273	41.14%
People First	5	Nam Choong-hee	55,231	10.45%
Democratic Labor	4	Park Choon-ho	14,899	2.82%
Democratic	3	Choi Ki-bok	6,442	1.21%
Hanmijun	5	Koh Nak-jung	2,707	0.51%
Total			528,041	100.00%
Voter turnout			49.43%	

=== 2010 ===
2010 Daejeon mayoral election
Party	#	Candidate	Votes	Percentage
Liberty Forward	3	Yeom Hong-cheol	276,122	46.67%
Grand National	1	Park Sung-hyo	168,616	28.50%
Democratic	2	Kim Won-woong	137,751	23.28%
New Progressive	7	Kim Yoon-ki	9,074	1.53%
Total			591,563	100.00%
Voter turnout			52.92%	

=== 2014 ===
2014 Daejeon mayoral election
Party	#	Candidate	Votes	Percentage
NPAD	2	Kwon Sun-taek	322,762	50.07%
Saenuri	1	Park Sung-hyo	301,389	46.76%
Justice	4	Han Chang-min	11,346	1.76%
Unified Progressive	3	Kim Chang-geun	9,009	1.39%
Total			644,506	100.00%
Voter turnout			54.03%	

=== 2018 ===
2018 Daejeon mayoral election
Party	#	Candidate	Votes	Percentage
Democratic	1	Heo Tae-jeong	393,354	56.41%
Liberty Korea	2	Park Sung-hyo	224,306	32.16%
Bareunmirae	3	Nam Choong-hee	61,271	8.78%
Justice	5	Kim Yoon-ki	18,351	2.63%
Total			697,282	100.00%
Voter turnout			57.97%	

=== 2022 ===
2022 Daejeon mayoral election
Party	#	Candidate	Votes	Percentage
People Power	2	Lee Jang-woo	310,035	51.19%
Democratic	1	Heo Tae-jeong	295,555	48.80%
Total			605,590	100.00%
Voter turnout			49.66%	

=== 2026 ===
Candidate	Party	Votes	%
Heo Tae-jeong	Democratic Party	394,391	53.49
Lee Jang-woo (incumbent)	People Power Party	325,589	44.16
Kang Heelin	Reform Party	17,370	2.36
Total		737,350	100.00
Valid votes		737,350	98.75
Invalid/blank votes		9,330	1.25
Total votes		746,680	100.00
Registered voters/turnout		1,250,891	59.69
Democratic gain from People Power			

== See also ==
- Government of South Korea
- Politics of South Korea
