= June 2022 South Korean by-elections =

The June 2022 South Korean by-elections for seven constituencies of the National Assembly were held in South Korea simultaneously with local elections on June 1, 2022.

Lee Jae-myung of the Democratic Party and Ahn Cheol-soo of the People Power Party, former candidates in the 2022 South Korean presidential election, ran successfully in the by-election for one of the constituencies.

== Reasons for by-elections ==
The following Members of National Assembly lost or resigned from their seats:

- Daegu Suseong District B: Hong Joon-pyo (People Power Party), resigned to run as a candidate in the 2022 South Korean presidential election, but he lost the party's primaries to Yoon Suk-yeol. Later, Hong launched his candidacy for the 2022 Daegu mayoral election.
- Incheon Gyeyang District B: Song Young-gil (Democratic Party), as the Democratic Party's chairman, resigned after Lee Jae-myung was defeated in the presidential election. Song later launched his candidacy for the 2022 Seoul mayoral election.
- Seongnam Bundang-gu A: Kim Eun-hye (People Power Party), resigned to run as a candidate for the governor of the Gyeonggi Province in the 2022 South Korean local elections.
- Jeju B: Oh Young-hun (Democratic Party), resigned to run as a candidate for the governor of the Jeju Province in the local elections.
- Seocheon Boryeong: Kim Tae-heum (People Power Party), resigned to run as a candidate for the governor of the South Chungcheong Province in the local elections.
- Changwon Uichang-gu: Park Wan-su (People Power Party), resigned to run as a candidate for the governor of the South Gyeongsang Province in the local elections.
- Gangwon Wonju 1st: Lee Kwang-jae (Democratic Party), as member of Lee Nak-yeon presidential campaign committee, resigned after Lee Nak-yeon lost the party's primaries to Lee Jae-myung. Later, Lee launched his candidacy for the governor of the Gangwon Province in the local elections.

== List of constituencies and candidates ==
Constituency	Candidate	
Constituency	Democratic	People Power
Suseong B (Daegu)	Kim Yong-rak	Lee Yin-Seon
Gyeyang B (Incheon)	Lee Jae-myung	Yoon Hyung-sun
Seongnam Bundang A (Gyeonggi)	Kim Byoung-gwan	Ahn Cheol-soo
Jeju B (Jeju)	Kim Han-kyu	Boo Sang-il
Boryeong-Seocheon (Chungnam)	Na So-yeol	Jang Dong-hyeok
Changwon Uichang-gu (Gyeongnam)	Kim Ji-soo	Kim Young-sun
Wonju A (Gangwon)	Won Chang-mook	Park Jeong-ha

== Results ==
=== Daegu Suseong ===
Candidate	Party	Votes	%
Lee Yin-Seon	People Power	49,434	79.78
Kim Yong-rak	Democratic	12,527	20.22
Total		61,961	100.00
Valid votes		61,961	94.55
Invalid/blank votes		3,572	5.45
Total votes		65,533	100.00
Registered voters/turnout		145,721	44.97
People Power hold			

=== Incheon Gyeyang ===
Candidate	Party	Votes	%
Lee Jae-myung	Democratic	44,289	55.24
Yoon Hyung-sun	People Power	35,886	44.76
Total		80,175	100.00
Valid votes		80,175	97.26
Invalid/blank votes		2,259	2.74
Total votes		82,434	100.00
Registered voters/turnout		137,090	60.13
Democratic hold			

=== Seongnam Bundang-gu ===
Candidate	Party	Votes	%
Ahn Cheol-soo	People Power	82,064	62.42
Kim Byoung-gwan	Democratic	49,414	37.58
Total		131,478	100.00
Valid votes		131,478	98.17
Invalid/blank votes		2,445	1.83
Total votes		133,923	100.00
Registered voters/turnout		210,119	63.74
People Power hold			

=== Jeju ===
Candidate	Party	Votes	%
Kim Han-kyu	Democratic	51,029	49.39
Boo Sang-il	People Power	46,668	45.17
Kim Woo-nam	Independent	5,630	5.45
Total		103,327	100.00
Valid votes		103,327	98.54
Invalid/blank votes		1,534	1.46
Total votes		104,861	100.00
Registered voters/turnout		191,736	54.69
Democratic hold			

=== Seocheon Boryeong ===
Candidate	Party	Votes	%
Jang Dong-hyuk	People Power	39,960	51.01
Na So-yeol	Democratic	38,377	48.99
Total		78,337	100.00
Valid votes		78,337	95.82
Invalid/blank votes		3,421	4.18
Total votes		81,758	100.00
Registered voters/turnout		131,968	61.95
People Power hold			

=== Changwon Uichang-gu ===
Candidate	Party	Votes	%
Kim Young-sun	People Power	66,828	62.79
Kim Ji-soo	Democratic	39,595	37.21
Total		106,423	100.00
Valid votes		106,423	96.52
Invalid/blank votes		3,841	3.48
Total votes		110,264	100.00
Registered voters/turnout		216,705	50.88
People Power hold			

=== Gangwon Wonju ===
Candidate	Party	Votes	%
Park Jeong-ha	People Power	44,611	57.74
Won Chang-mook	Democratic	32,652	42.26
Total		77,263	100.00
Valid votes		77,263	97.12
Invalid/blank votes		2,291	2.88
Total votes		79,554	100.00
Registered voters/turnout		155,174	51.27
People Power gain from Democratic			
