= Lee Won-taeg =

South Korean politician (born 1970)

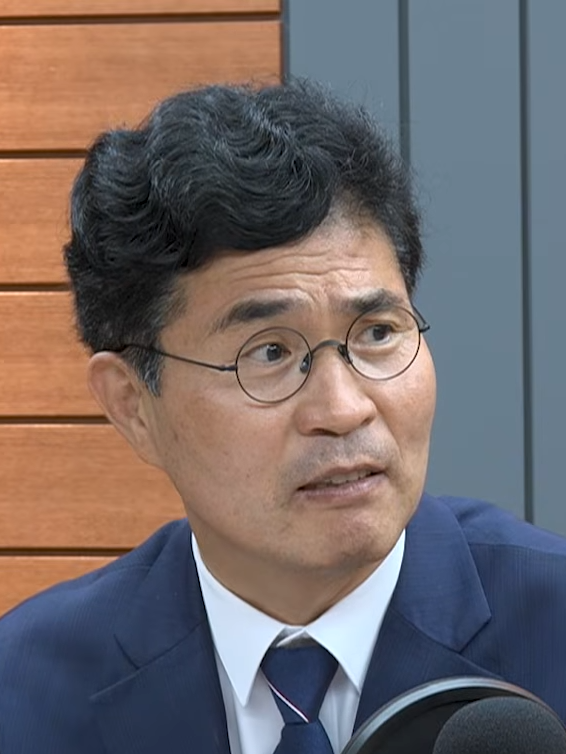
- Lee in 2026

Governor of Jeonbuk State
- Incumbent
- Assumed office 1 July 2026
- Preceded by: Kim Kwan-young

Personal details
- Born: 25 January 1970 (age 56)

Korean name
- Hangul: 이원택
- RR: I Wontaek
- MR: I Wŏnt'aek

Lee Won-taeg (Korean: 이원택; born 25 January 1970) is a South Korean politician who has served as the governor of Jeonbuk State since 2026. He is a member of the Democratic Party.

Lee earned a degree in Chemical Engineering from Jeonbuk National University.

== Election results ==
=== General elections ===
Year	Elections	Constituency	Political party	Votes (%)	Results
2020	21st National Assembly General Election	Gimje–Buan (North Jeolla)	Democratic	51,981 (66.68%)	Won
2024	22nd National Assembly General Election	Gunsan–Gimje–Buan B (North Jeolla)	Democratic	72,455 (86.63%)	Won

=== Local elections ===
==== Governor of Jeonbuk ====
Year	Elections	Constituency	Political party	Votes (%)	Remarks
2026	9th Iocal Election	Jeonbuk (Governoral Elections)	Democratic	473,436 (51.22%)	Won

==== Jeonju Council ====
Year	Elections	Constituency	Political party	Votes (%)	Remarks
2002	3rd Iocal Election	Jeonju Pyeonghwa 2 dong	Independent	3,074 (34.55%)	Defeated (2nd)
2006	4th Iocal Election	Jeonju 4th	Uri	4,830 (29.50%)	Won
