= Governor of North Gyeongsang Province =

- 경상북도지사
- Seal of North Gyeongsang

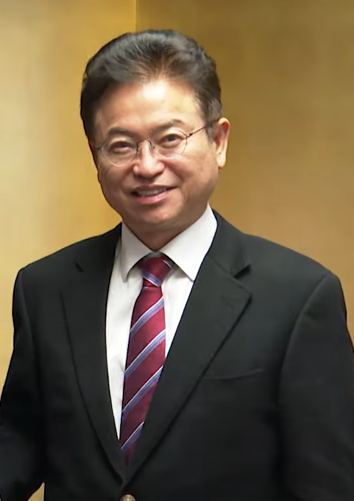
- Incumbent; Lee Cheol-woo since 1 July 2018
- Term length: Four years
- Inaugural holder: Kim Dae-woo
- Formation: 15 August 1945; 81 years ago

The Governor of North Gyeongsang Province (Korean: 경상북도지사; Hanja: 慶尙北道知事) is the head of the local government of North Gyeongsang Province who is elected to a four-year term.

== List of governors ==
=== Appointed governors (before 1995) ===
From 1945 to 1995, the Governor of North Gyeongsang Province was appointed by the President of the Republic of Korea.

=== Directly elected governors (1995–present) ===
Since 1995, under provisions of the revised Local Government Act, the Governor of North Gyeongsang Province is elected by direct election.

Political parties
Conservative

Term	Portrait	Name (Birth–Death)	Term of office			Political party	Elected
Term	Portrait	Name (Birth–Death)	Took office	Left office	Time in office	Political party	Elected
1st		Lee Eui-geun 이의근 李義根 (1938–2009)	1 July 1995	30 June 2006	11 years, 0 days	Democratic Liberal → New Korea → Grand National	1995
2nd		Lee Eui-geun 이의근 李義根 (1938–2009)	1 July 1995	30 June 2006	11 years, 0 days	Democratic Liberal → New Korea → Grand National	1998
3rd		Lee Eui-geun 이의근 李義根 (1938–2009)	1 July 1995	30 June 2006	11 years, 0 days	Democratic Liberal → New Korea → Grand National	2002
4th		Kim Kwan-yong 김관용 金寬容 (born 1942)	1 July 2006	30 June 2018	12 years, 0 days	Grand National → Saenuri → Liberty Korea	2006
5th		Kim Kwan-yong 김관용 金寬容 (born 1942)	1 July 2006	30 June 2018	12 years, 0 days	Grand National → Saenuri → Liberty Korea	2010
6th		Kim Kwan-yong 김관용 金寬容 (born 1942)	1 July 2006	30 June 2018	12 years, 0 days	Grand National → Saenuri → Liberty Korea	2014
7th		Lee Cheol-woo 이철우 李喆雨 (born 1955)	1 July 2018	Incumbent	8 years, 69 days	Liberty Korea → United Future → People Power	2018
8th		Lee Cheol-woo 이철우 李喆雨 (born 1955)	1 July 2018	Incumbent	8 years, 69 days	Liberty Korea → United Future → People Power	2022
9th		Lee Cheol-woo 이철우 李喆雨 (born 1955)	1 July 2018	Incumbent	8 years, 69 days	Liberty Korea → United Future → People Power	2026

== Elections ==
=== 1995 ===
1995 North Gyeongsang gubernatorial election
Party	#	Candidate	Votes	Percentage
Democratic Liberal	1	Lee Eui-geun	541,535	37.94%
Independent	3	Lee Pan-suk	489,999	34.33%
United Liberal Democrats	2	Park Jun-hong	395,496	27.71%
Total			1,427,030	100.00%
Voter turnout			76.75%	

=== 1998 ===
1998 North Gyeongsang gubernatorial election
Party	#	Candidate	Votes	Percentage
Grand National	1	Lee Eui-geun	911,728	71.96%
United Liberal Democrats	3	Lee Pan-suk	355,149	28.03%
Total			1,266,877	100.00%
Voter turnout			64.88%	

=== 2002 ===
2002 North Gyeongsang gubernatorial election
Party	#	Candidate	Votes	Percentage
Grand National	1	Lee Eui-geun	1,028,080	85.49%
Independent	3	Cho Young-gun	174,472	14.50%
Total			1,202,552	100.00%
Voter turnout			60.37%	

=== 2006 ===
2006 North Gyeongsang gubernatorial election
Party	#	Candidate	Votes	Percentage
Grand National	2	Kim Kwan-yong	961,363	76.80%
Uri	1	Park Myung-jae	290,358	23.19%
Total			1,251,721	100.00%
Voter turnout			61.52%	

=== 2010 ===
2010 North Gyeongsang gubernatorial election
Party	#	Candidate	Votes	Percentage
Grand National	1	Kim Kwan-yong	913,812	75.36%
Democratic	2	Hong Eui-rak	143,347	11.82%
Participation	7	Yoo Sung-chan	87,346	7.20%
Democratic Labor	5	Yoon Byung-tae	68,015	5.60%
Total			1,212,520	100.00%
Voter turnout			59.38%	

=== 2014 ===
2014 North Gyeongsang gubernatorial election
Party	#	Candidate	Votes	Percentage
Saenuri	1	Kim Kwan-yong	986,989	77.73%
NPAD	2	Oh Joong-gi	189,603	14.93%
Justice	4	Park Chang-ho	59,609	4.69%
Unified Progressive	3	Yoon Byung-tae	33,458	2.63%
Total			1,269,659	100.00%
Voter turnout			59.45%	

=== 2018 ===
2018 North Gyeongsang gubernatorial election
Party	#	Candidate	Votes	Percentage
Liberty Korea	2	Lee Cheol-woo	732,785	52.11%
Democratic	1	Oh Joong-gi	482,564	34.32%
Bareunmirae	3	Kwon Oe-eul	143,409	10.19%
Justice	5	Park Chang-ho	47,250	3.36%
Total			1,406,008	100.00%
Voter turnout			64.74%	

=== 2022 ===
2022 North Gyeongsang gubernatorial election
Party	#	Candidate	Votes	Percentage
People Power	2	Lee Cheol-woo	904,675	77.95%
Democratic	1	Lim Mi-ae	255,775	22.04%
Total			1,160,450	100.00%
Voter turnout			52.66%	

=== 2026 ===
Candidate	Party	Votes	%
Lee Cheol-woo (incumbent)	People Power Party	878,556	67.24
Oh Jung-ki	Democratic Party	427,956	32.76
Total		1,306,512	100.00
Valid votes		1,306,512	97.60
Invalid/blank votes		32,075	2.40
Total votes		1,338,587	100.00
Registered voters/turnout		2,202,861	60.77
People Power hold			

== See also ==
- Government of South Korea
- Politics of South Korea
