= 2022 South Korean local elections =

Public vote for local offices in the Republic of Korea

- 1 June 2022

17 regional heads 824 regional councilors 226 municipal mayors 2,926 municipal councilors
- Registered: 44,303,449
- Turnout: 22,564,394; 50.9% (▼9.3pp)
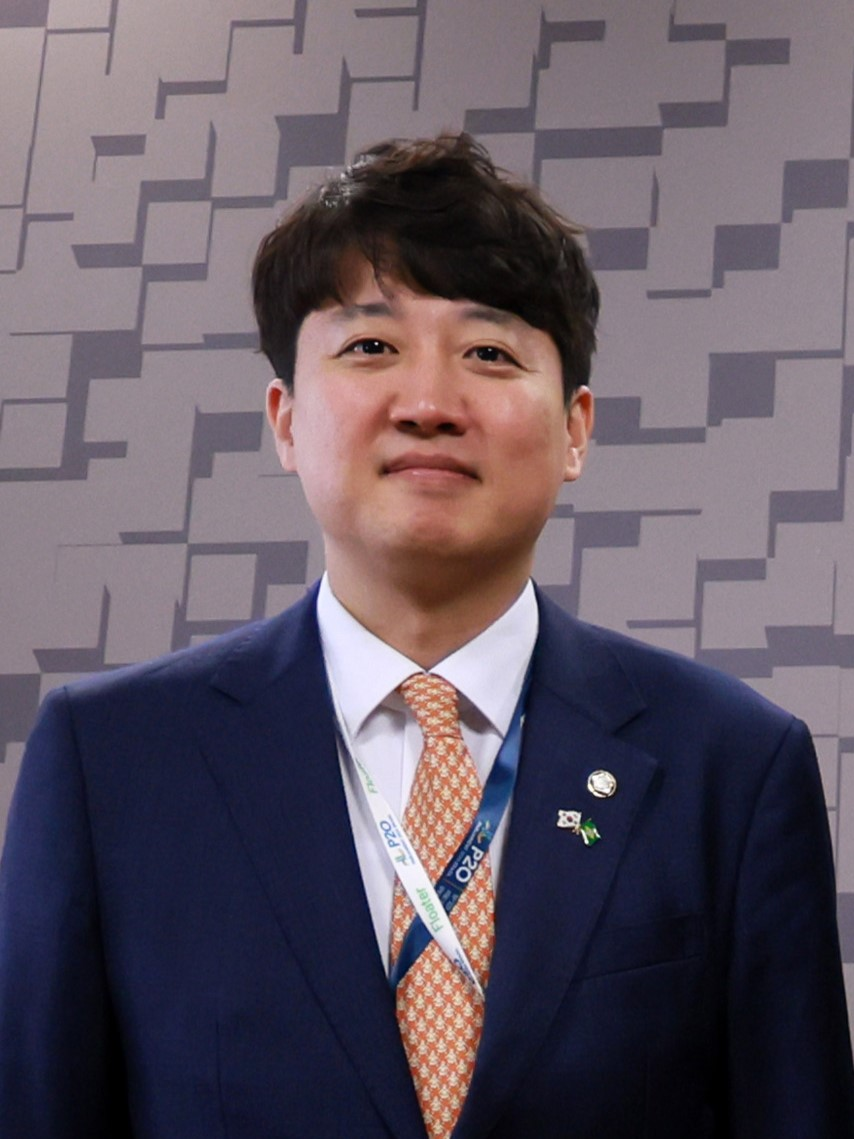

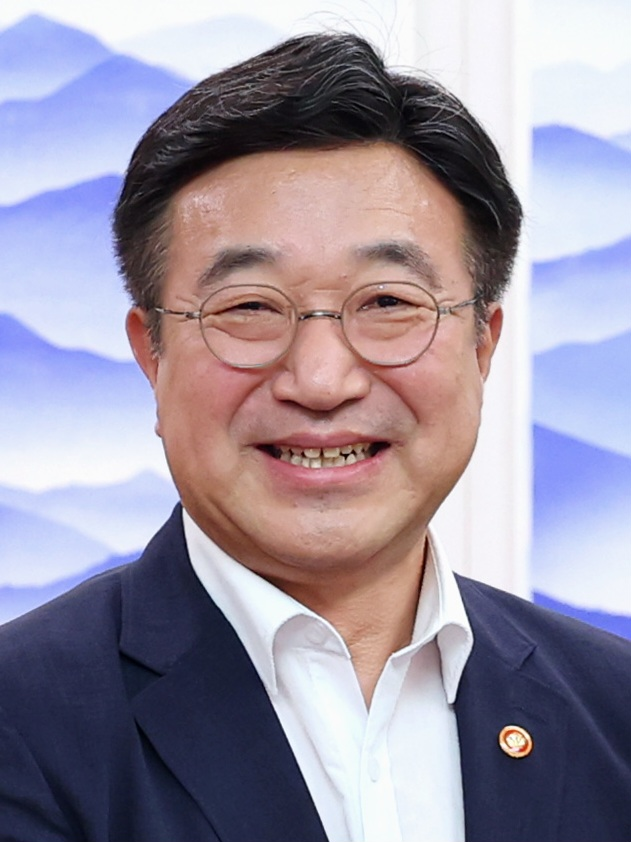

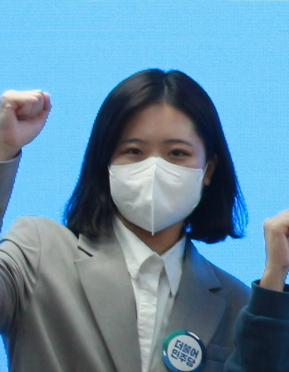
	First party	Second party
Leader	Lee Jun-seok	Yun Ho-jung & Park Ji-hyun
Party	People Power	Democratic
Regional seats last election	2 heads 137 councilors	14 heads 652 councilors
Municipal seats last election	53 mayors 1,009 councilors	151 mayors 1,638 councilors
Regional seats won	12 heads 540 councilors	5 heads 322 councilors
Regional seat change	▲10 heads ▲403 councilors	▼9 heads ▼330 councilors
Municipal seats won	145 mayors 1,435 councilors	63 mayors 1,384 councilors
Municipal seat change	▲92 mayors ▲426 councilors	▼88 mayors ▼254 councilors

The 8th local elections were held in South Korea on 1 June 2022. These elections came after the presidential election in March 2022, and coincided with the by-elections for the vacant seats in the National Assembly. It was the first nationwide election under President Yoon Suk Yeol after taking office on 10 May.

President Yoon Suk Yeol's party, the People Power Party, decisively won the local elections. The 50.9% turnout is the lowest since 2002.

== Process ==
Citizens born before 2 June 2004 had the right to vote and the right to be elected.

== Regional head elections ==
Party	Votes	%	Seats	+/–
People Power Party	11,989,460	53.97	12	+10
Democratic Party	9,762,313	43.95	5	–9
Justice Party	251,926	1.13	0	0
Progressive Party	78,870	0.36	0	New
Basic Income Party	38,898	0.18	0	New
United Korea Party	12,353	0.06	0	New
Green Party Korea	5,750	0.03	0	0
Independents	73,896	0.33	0	–1
Total	22,213,466	100.00	17	0
Valid votes	22,213,466	98.44		
Invalid/blank votes	350,928	1.56		
Total votes	22,564,394	100.00		
Registered voters/turnout	44,303,449	50.93		
Source: National Election Commission

=== Summary ===
Province/City	Head	Incumbent	Party	Elected	Party
Seoul	Mayor	Oh Se-hoon	People Power	Oh Se-hoon	People Power
Busan	Mayor	Park Heong-joon	People Power	Park Heong-joon	People Power
Daegu	Mayor	Kwon Young-jin	People Power	Hong Joon-pyo	People Power
Incheon	Mayor	Park Nam-choon	Democratic	Yoo Jeong-bok	People Power
Gwangju	Mayor	Lee Yong-seop	Democratic	Kang Gi-jung	Democratic
Daejeon	Mayor	Heo Tae-jeong	Democratic	Lee Jang-woo	People Power
Ulsan	Mayor	Song Cheol-ho	Democratic	Kim Doo-gyum	People Power
Sejong	Mayor	Lee Choon-hee	Democratic	Choi Min-ho	People Power
Gyeonggi	Governor	Oh Byeong-kwon (acting)	Independent	Kim Dong-yeon	Democratic
Gangwon	Governor	Choi Moon-soon	Democratic	Kim Jin-tae	People Power
North Chungcheong	Governor	Lee Si-jong	Democratic	Kim Young-hwan	People Power
South Chungcheong	Governor	Yang Seung-jo	Democratic	Kim Tae-heum	People Power
North Jeolla	Governor	Song Ha-jin	Democratic	Kim Kwan-young	Democratic
South Jeolla	Governor	Kim Yung-rok	Democratic	Kim Yung-rok	Democratic
North Gyeongsang	Governor	Lee Cheol-woo	People Power	Lee Cheol-woo	People Power
South Gyeongsang	Governor	Ha Byung-pil (acting)	Independent	Park Wan-su	People Power
Jeju	Governor	Koo Man-sub (acting)	Independent	Oh Young-hun	Democratic

=== Seoul ===
==== Polling average ====
Polling Average
Aggregation Firm	Fieldwork date	Updated date	Song Young-gil	Oh Se-hoon	Others/ Undecided	Lead
Opinion M (Final)	1 Apr 2021 – 25 May 2022	27 May 2022	36.6%	56.5%	6.9%	19.9%
Election20 (Final)	28 Apr 2022 – 25 May 2022	28 May 2022	35.3%	55.4%	9.3%	20.1%

==== Results ====
Candidate	Party	Votes	%
Oh Se-hoon (incumbent)	People Power Party	2,608,277	59.05
Song Young-gil	Democratic Party	1,733,183	39.24
Gwon Su-jeong	Justice Party	53,840	1.22
Shin Ji-hye	Basic Income Party	12,619	0.29
Kim Gwang-jong	Independent	9,000	0.20
Total		4,416,919	100.00
Valid votes		4,416,919	99.14
Invalid/blank votes		38,242	0.86
Total votes		4,455,161	100.00
Registered voters/turnout		8,378,339	53.17
People Power hold			
Source: National Election Commission

=== Busan ===
==== Polling average ====
Polling Average
Aggregation Firm	Fieldwork date	Updated date	Byeon Sung-wan	Park Heong-joon	Others/ Undecided	Lead
Opinion M (Final)	1 Apr 2021 – 25 May 2022	27 May 2022	29.4%	59%	11.6%	29.6%

==== Results ====
Candidate	Party	Votes	%
Park Heong-joon (incumbent)	People Power Party	938,601	66.37
Byeon Sung-wan	Democratic Party	455,901	32.24
Kim Young-jin	Justice Party	19,733	1.40
Total		1,414,235	100.00
Valid votes		1,414,235	98.75
Invalid/blank votes		17,959	1.25
Total votes		1,432,194	100.00
Registered voters/turnout		2,916,832	49.10
People Power hold			
Source: National Election Commission

=== Daegu ===
==== Polling average ====
Polling Average
Aggregation Firm	Fieldwork date	Updated date	Seo Jae-heon	Hong Joon-pyo	Others/ Undecided	Lead
Opinion M (Final)	1 Apr 2021 – 25 May 2022	27 May 2022	15.5%	67.7%	16.8%	52.2%

==== Results ====
Candidate	Party	Votes	%
Hong Joon-pyo	People Power Party	685,159	78.75
Seo Jae-heon	Democratic Party	156,429	17.98
Han Min-jeong	Justice Party	20,904	2.40
Shin Won-ho	Basic Income Party	7,542	0.87
Total		870,034	100.00
Valid votes		870,034	98.52
Invalid/blank votes		13,107	1.48
Total votes		883,141	100.00
Registered voters/turnout		2,044,579	43.19
People Power hold			
Source: National Election Commission

=== Incheon ===
==== Polling average ====
Polling Average
Aggregation Firm	Fieldwork date	Updated date	Park Nam-choon	Yoo Jung-bok	Lee Jeong-mi	Others/ Undecided	Lead
Opinion M (Final)	1 Apr 2021 – 25 May 2022	27 May 2022	37.5%	46.8%	3.3%	12.4%	9.3%
Election20 (Final)	28 Apr 2022 – 25 May 2022	28 May 2022	37.4%	47.5%	(OTH)	15.1%	10.1%

==== Results ====
Candidate	Party	Votes	%
Yoo Jung-bok	People Power Party	634,250	51.77
Park Nam-choon (incumbent)	Democratic Party	545,885	44.56
Lee Jeong-mi	Justice Party	38,921	3.18
Kim Han-byeol	Basic Income Party	6,079	0.50
Total		1,225,135	100.00
Valid votes		1,225,135	98.76
Invalid/blank votes		15,334	1.24
Total votes		1,240,469	100.00
Registered voters/turnout		2,534,338	48.95
People Power hold			
Source: National Election Commission

=== Gwangju ===
==== Polling average ====
Polling Average
Aggregation Firm	Fieldwork date	Updated date	Kang Gi-jung	Choo Gi-hwan	Jang Yeon-joo	Others/ Undecided	Lead
Opinion M (Final)	1 Apr 2021 – 25 May 2022	27 May 2022	63.3%	12.9%	3.3%	20.5%	50.4%

==== Results ====
Candidate	Party	Votes	%
Kang Gi-jung	Democratic Party	334,699	74.92
Choo Gi-hwan	People Power Party	71,062	15.91
Jang Yeon-joo	Justice Party	21,070	4.72
Kim Ju-eop	Progressive Party	16,595	3.71
Moon Hyeon-cheol	Basic Income Party	3,344	0.75
Total		446,770	100.00
Valid votes		446,770	98.30
Invalid/blank votes		7,746	1.70
Total votes		454,516	100.00
Registered voters/turnout		1,206,886	37.66
Democratic hold			
Source: National Election Commission

=== Daejeon ===
==== Polling average ====
Polling Average
Aggregation Firm	Fieldwork date	Updated date	Heo Tae-jeong	Lee Jang-woo	Others/ Undecided	Lead
Opinion M (Final)	1 Apr 2021 – 25 May 2022	27 May 2022	39.3%	43.2%	17.5%	3.9%
Election20 (Final)	28 Apr 2022 – 25 May 2022	28 May 2022	40.3%	45.6%	14.1%	5.3%

==== Results ====
Candidate	Party	Votes	%
Lee Jang-woo	People Power Party	310,035	51.20
Heo Tae-jeong (incumbent)	Democratic Party	295,555	48.80
Total		605,590	100.00
Valid votes		605,590	98.85
Invalid/blank votes		7,049	1.15
Total votes		612,639	100.00
Registered voters/turnout		1,233,557	49.66
People Power gain from Democratic			
Source: National Election Commission

=== Ulsan ===
==== Polling average ====
Polling Average
Aggregation Firm	Fieldwork date	Updated date	Song Cheol-ho	Kim Doo-gyeom	Others/ Undecided	Lead
Opinion M (Final)	1 Apr 2021 – 25 May 2022	27 May 2022	31%	49.9%	19.1%	18.9%

==== Results ====
Candidate	Party	Votes	%
Kim Doo-gyeom	People Power Party	290,563	59.79
Song Cheol-ho (incumbent)	Democratic Party	195,430	40.21
Total		485,993	100.00
Valid votes		485,993	98.81
Invalid/blank votes		5,873	1.19
Total votes		491,866	100.00
Registered voters/turnout		941,189	52.26
People Power gain from Democratic			
Source: National Election Commission

=== Sejong ===
==== Polling average ====
Polling Average
Aggregation Firm	Fieldwork date	Updated date	Lee Choon-hee	Choi Min-ho	Others/ Undecided	Lead
Opinion M (Final)	1 Apr 2021 – 25 May 2022	27 May 2022	41.1%	44.3%	14.6%	3.2%
Election20 (Final)	28 Apr 2022 – 25 May 2022	28 May 2022	41.0%	44.4%	14.6%	3.4%

==== Results ====
Candidate	Party	Votes	%
Choi Min-ho	People Power Party	78,415	52.84
Lee Choon-hee (incumbent)	Democratic Party	69,995	47.16
Total		148,410	100.00
Valid votes		148,410	99.10
Invalid/blank votes		1,341	0.90
Total votes		149,751	100.00
Registered voters/turnout		292,259	51.24
People Power gain from Democratic			
Source: National Election Commission

=== Gyeonggi ===
==== Polling average ====
Polling Average
Aggregation Firm	Fieldwork date	Updated date	Kim Dong-yeon	Kim Eun-hye	Kang Yong-suk	Others/ Undecided	Lead
Opinion M (Final)	1 Apr 2021 – 25 May 2022	27 May 2022	40.7%	44.6%	4.9%	9.8%	3.9%
Election20 (Final)	28 Apr 2022 – 25 May 2022	28 May 2022	41.0%	42.8%	(OTH)	16.2%	1.8%
SkoPolitics (Final)	9 May – 25 May 2022	25 May 2022	41.31%	42.60%	(OTH)	16.09%	1.29%

==== Results ====
Candidate	Party	Votes	%
Kim Dong-yeon	Democratic Party	2,827,593	49.07
Kim Eun-hye	People Power Party	2,818,680	48.91
Kang Yong-suk	Independent	54,758	0.95
Hwang Sun-sik	Justice Party	38,525	0.67
Song Young-ju	Progressive Party	13,939	0.24
Seo Tae-seong	Basic Income Party	9,314	0.16
Total		5,762,809	100.00
Valid votes		5,762,809	99.01
Invalid/blank votes		57,822	0.99
Total votes		5,820,631	100.00
Registered voters/turnout		11,497,206	50.63
Democratic hold			
Source: National Election Commission

=== Gangwon ===
==== Polling average ====
Polling Average
Aggregation Firm	Fieldwork date	Updated date	Lee Kwang-jae	Kim Jin-tae	Others/ Undecided	Lead
Opinion M (Final)	1 Apr 2021 – 25 May 2022	27 May 2022	39.0%	47.8%	13.2%	8.8%
Election20 (Final)	28 Apr 2022 – 25 May 2022	28 May 2022	39.3%	49%	11.7%	9.7%

==== Results ====
Candidate	Party	Votes	%
Kim Jin-tae	People Power	409,461	54.07
Lee Kwang-jae	Democratic Party	347,766	45.93
Total		757,227	100.00
Valid votes		757,227	98.02
Invalid/blank votes		15,271	1.98
Total votes		772,498	100.00
Registered voters/turnout		1,336,080	57.82
People Power gain from Democratic			
Source: National Election Commission

=== North Chungcheong ===
==== Polling average ====
Polling Average
Aggregation Firm	Fieldwork date	Updated date	Roh Young-min	Kim Young-hwan	Others/ Undecided	Lead
Opinion M (Final)	1 Apr 2021 – 25 May 2022	27 May 2022	36.5%	48.5%	15.0%	12.0%
Election20 (Final)	28 Apr 2022 – 25 May 2022	28 May 2022	36.2%	48.9%	14.9%	12.7%

==== Results ====
Candidate	Party	Votes	%
Kim Young-hwan	People Power Party	395,517	58.19
Roh Young-min	Democratic Party	284,166	41.81
Total		679,683	100.00
Valid votes		679,683	98.17
Invalid/blank votes		12,641	1.83
Total votes		692,324	100.00
Registered voters/turnout		1,368,779	50.58
People Power gain from Democratic			
Source: National Election Commission

=== South Chungcheong ===
==== Polling average ====
Polling Average
Aggregation Firm	Fieldwork date	Updated date	Yang Seung-jo	Kim Tae-heum	Others/ Undecided	Lead
Opinion M (Final)	1 Apr 2021 – 25 May 2022	27 May 2022	42.7%	45.1%	12.2%	2.4%
Election20 (Final)	28 Apr 2022 – 25 May 2022	28 May 2022	41.1%	45.9%	13.0%	4.8%

==== Results ====
Candidate	Party	Votes	%
Kim Tae-heum	People Power Party	468,658	53.87
Yang Seung-jo (incumbent)	Democratic Party	401,308	46.13
Total		869,966	100.00
Valid votes		869,966	96.84
Invalid/blank votes		28,403	3.16
Total votes		898,369	100.00
Registered voters/turnout		1,803,096	49.82
People Power gain from Democratic			
Source: National Election Commission

=== North Jeolla ===
==== Results ====
Candidate	Party	Votes	%
Kim Gwan-young	Democratic Party	591,510	82.12
Cho Bae-suk	People Power Party	128,828	17.88
Total		720,338	100.00
Valid votes		720,338	96.64
Invalid/blank votes		25,016	3.36
Total votes		745,354	100.00
Registered voters/turnout		1,532,133	48.65
Democratic hold			
Source: National Election Commission

=== South Jeolla ===
==== Polling average ====
Polling Average
Aggregation Firm	Fieldwork date	Updated date	Kim Yung-rok	Lee Jung-hyun	Others/ Undecided	Lead
Opinion M (Final)	1 Apr 2021 – 25 May 2022	27 May 2022	62.2%	15.1%	22.7%	47.1%

==== Results ====
Candidate	Party	Votes	%
Kim Yung-rok (incumbent)	Democratic Party	672,433	75.74
Lee Jung-hyun	People Power Party	167,020	18.81
Min Jeom-ki	Progressive	48,336	5.44
Total		887,789	100.00
Valid votes		887,789	96.15
Invalid/blank votes		35,558	3.85
Total votes		923,347	100.00
Registered voters/turnout		1,580,098	58.44
Democratic hold			
Source: National Election Commission

=== North Gyeongsang ===
==== Results ====
Candidate	Party	Votes	%
Lee Cheol-woo (incumbent)	People Power Party	904,675	77.96
Im Mi-ae	Democratic	255,775	22.04
Total		1,160,450	100.00
Valid votes		1,160,450	97.14
Invalid/blank votes		34,145	2.86
Total votes		1,194,595	100.00
Registered voters/turnout		2,268,707	52.66
People Power hold			
Source: National Election Commission

=== South Gyeongsang ===
==== Polling average ====
Polling Average
Aggregation Firm	Fieldwork date	Updated date	Yang Moon-seok	Park Wan-su	Yeo Yeong-gug	Others/ Undecided	Lead
Opinion M (Final)	1 Apr 2021 – 25 May 2022	27 May 2022	24.1%	55.5%	3.0%	17.4%	31.4%

==== Results ====
Candidate	Party	Votes	%
Park Wan-su	People Power Party	963,473	65.71
Yang Moon-seok	Democratic Party	431,569	29.43
Yeo Yeong-gug	Justice Party	58,933	4.02
Choi Jin-seok	United Korea Party	12,353	0.84
Total		1,466,328	100.00
Valid votes		1,466,328	97.92
Invalid/blank votes		31,072	2.08
Total votes		1,497,400	100.00
Registered voters/turnout		2,804,287	53.40
People Power gain			
Source: National Election Commission

=== Jeju ===
==== Polling average ====
Polling Average
Aggregation Firm	Fieldwork date	Updated date	Oh Young-hun	Huh Hyang-jin	Others/ Undecided	Lead
Opinion M (Final)	1 Apr 2021 – 25 May 2022	27 May 2022	49.1%	33.0%	17.9%	16.1%
Election20 (Final)	28 Apr 2022 – 25 May 2022	28 May 2022	45.5%	30.4%	24.1%	15.1%

==== Results ====
Candidate	Party	Votes	%
Oh Young-hun	Democratic Party	163,116	55.15
Huh Hyang-jin	People Power Party	116,786	39.48
Park Chan-shik	Independent	10,138	3.43
Bu Soon-jeong	Green Party Korea	5,750	1.94
Total		295,790	100.00
Valid votes		295,790	98.55
Invalid/blank votes		4,349	1.45
Total votes		300,139	100.00
Registered voters/turnout		565,084	53.11
Democratic gain			
Source: National Election Commission

== Regional council elections ==
Party	Proportional			Constituency			Total seats	+/–
Party	Votes	%	Seats	Votes	%	Seats	Total seats	+/–
People Power Party	11,597,442	52.36	49	10,220,187	52.00	491	540	+403
Democratic Party	9,274,784	41.88	42	8,656,901	44.04	280	322	–330
Justice Party	916,428	4.14	2	44,250	0.23	0	2	–9
Progressive Party	203,299	0.92	0	105,328	0.54	3	3	+3
Basic Income Party	94,329	0.43	0				0	New
Green Party Korea	50,942	0.23	0	1,936	0.01	0	0	0
Korean Wave Union Party	5,790	0.03	0				0	New
Dokdo Party	2,974	0.01	0				0	New
Unification Korea Party	2,440	0.01	0				0	New
Labor Party				3,965	0.02	0	0	0
Minsaeng Party				386	0.00	0	0	–8
Our Republican Party				327	0.00	0	0	New
South-North Unification Party				314	0.00	0	0	New
Korea Party				283	0.00	0	0	New
Independents				621,381	3.16	5	5	–11
Total	22,148,428	100.00	93	19,655,258	100.00	779	872	+48
Valid votes	22,148,428	98.17		19,655,258	97.63			
Invalid/blank votes	412,843	1.83		477,055	2.37			
Total votes	22,561,271	100.00		20,132,313	100.00			
Registered voters/turnout	44,303,449	50.92		39,303,285	51.22			
Source: National Election Commission

=== Results by province or city ===
Province/City	Seats	PPP	DPK	PP	JP	IND
Seoul	112	76	36			
Busan	47	45	2			
Daegu	32	31	1			
Incheon	40	26	14			
Gwangju	23	1	22			
Daejeon	22	18	4			
Ulsan	22	21	1			
Sejong	20	7	13			
Gyeonggi	156	78	78			
Gangwon	49	43	6			
North Chungcheong	35	28	7			
South Chungcheong	48	36	12			
North Jeolla	40	1	37	1	1	
South Jeolla	61	1	56	2	1	1
North Gyeongsang	61	56	2			3
South Gyeongsang	64	60	4			
Jeju	40	12	27			1
Total	872	540	322	3	2	5
Source: National Election Commission

=== Constituency seats ===
Province/City	Seats	PPP	DPK	PP	IND
Seoul	101	70	31		
Busan	42	42			
Daegu	29	29			
Incheon	36	24	12		
Gwangju	20		20		
Daejeon	19	16	3		
Ulsan	19	19			
Sejong	18	6	12		
Gyeonggi	141	70	71		
Gangwon	44	40	4		
North Chungcheong	31	26	5		
South Chungcheong	43	33	10		
North Jeolla	36		35	1	
South Jeolla	55		52	2	1
North Gyeongsang	55	52			3
South Gyeongsang	58	56	2		
Jeju	32	8	23		1
Total	779	491	280	3	5
Source: National Election Commission; Yonhap News Agency

=== Proportional representation seats ===
Province/City	Seats	PPP	DPK	JP
Seoul	11	6	5	
Busan	5	3	2	
Daegu	3	2	1	
Incheon	4	2	2	
Gwangju	3	1	2	
Daejeon	3	2	1	
Ulsan	3	2	1	
Sejong	2	1	1	
Gyeonggi	15	8	7	
Gangwon	5	3	2	
North Chungcheong	4	2	2	
South Chungcheong	5	3	2	
North Jeolla	4	1	2	1
South Jeolla	6	1	4	1
North Gyeongsang	6	4	2	
South Gyeongsang	6	4	2	
Jeju	8	4	4	
Total	93	49	42	2
Source: National Election Commission; Yonhap News Agency

== Municipal mayors ==
Distribution of Elected Mayors by Party People Power Democratic Progressive Independent

Party	Votes	%	Seats	+/–
People Power Party	10,730,864	50.35	145	+92
Democratic Party	9,177,305	43.06	63	–88
Justice Party	70,135	0.33	0	0
Progressive Party	41,846	0.20	1	+1
Our Republican Party	1,152	0.01	0	New
People's Grand Unified Party	1,102	0.01	0	New
Korean Wave Union Party	369	0.00	0	New
Korea Party	114	0.00	0	New
Independents	1,287,867	6.04	17	0
Total	21,310,754	100.00	226	0
Valid votes	21,310,754	98.23		
Invalid/blank votes	384,835	1.77		
Total votes	21,695,589	100.00		
Registered voters/turnout	42,443,817	51.12		
Source: National Election Commission

=== Results by province or city ===
Province/City	Mayors	PPP	DPK	PP	IND
Seoul	25	17	8		
Busan	16	16			
Daegu	8	8			
Incheon	10	7	2		1
Gwangju	5		5		
Daejeon	5	4	1		
Ulsan	5	4		1	
Gyeonggi	31	22	9		
Gangwon	18	14	4		
North Chungcheong	11	7	4		
South Chungcheong	15	12	3		
North Jeolla	14		11		3
South Jeolla	22		15		7
North Gyeongsang	23	20			3
South Gyeongsang	18	14	1		3
Total	226	145	63	1	17
Source: National Election Commission

== Municipal council elections ==
Party	Proportional			Constituency			Total seats	+/–
Party	Votes	%	Seats	Votes	%	Seats	Total seats	+/–
People Power Party	9,754,817	52.96	219	8,451,584	47.22	1,216	1,435	+426
Democratic Party	8,152,655	44.26	166	7,790,718	43.53	1,218	1,384	–254
Justice Party	342,292	1.86	1	238,736	1.33	6	7	–19
Progressive Party	165,907	0.90	0	235,759	1.32	17	17	+6
Chungcheong's Future Party	1,500	0.01	0				0	New
Korean Welfare Party	1,447	0.01	0				0	0
Our Republican Party	1,396	0.01	0	1,233	0.01	0	0	New
Unification Korea Party	515	0.00	0	499	0.00	0	0	New
Labor Party				8,166	0.05	0	0	0
Green Party Korea				6,962	0.04	0	0	0
Mirae Party				5,413	0.03	0	0	0
Transition Korea				1,012	0.01	0	0	New
Awakened Civic Solidarity Party				867	0.00	0	0	New
Liberal Unification Party				265	0.00	0	0	New
Christian Party				207	0.00	0	0	New
Revolution 21				149	0.00	0	0	New
New Korean Peninsula Peace Party				95	0.00	0	0	New
Korean Wave Union Party				69	0.00	0	0	New
Dokdo Party				63	0.00	0	0	New
Independents				1,157,482	6.47	144	144	–28
Total	18,420,529	100.00	386	17,899,279	100.00	2,601	2,987	+61
Valid votes	18,420,529	97.58		17,899,279	94.57			
Invalid/blank votes	456,444	2.42		1,027,801	5.43			
Total votes	18,876,973	100.00		18,927,080	100.00			
Registered voters/turnout	37,403,903	50.47		37,206,057	50.87			
Source: National Election Commission

=== Results by province or city ===
Province/City	Seats	PPP	DPK	PP	JP	IND
Seoul	427	213	212	1		1
Busan	182	104	77			1
Daegu	121	92	28			1
Incheon	123	59	62		1	1
Gwangju	69		57	6	1	5
Daejeon	63	32	31			
Ulsan	50	30	18	2		
Gyeonggi	463	229	232	1		1
Gangwon	174	101	66		1	6
North Chungcheong	136	79	55	1		1
South Chungcheong	177	95	80			2
North Jeolla	197	3	168	1	1	24
South Jeolla	247	1	193	5	3	45
North Gyeongsang	288	225	25			38
South Gyeongsang	270	172	80			18
Total	2,987	1,435	1,384	17	7	144
Source: National Election Commission

=== Constituency seats ===
Province/City	Seats	DPK	PPP	PP	JP	IND
Seoul	373	188	183	1		1
Busan	157	68	88			1
Daegu	105	24	80			1
Incheon	108	56	50		1	1
Gwangju	60	48		6	1	5
Daejeon	55	28	27			
Ulsan	44	17	25	2		
Gyeonggi	406	208	196	1		1
Gangwon	151	63	81		1	6
North Chungcheong	119	51	66	1		1
South Chungcheong	151	70	79			2
North Jeolla	172	146		1	1	24
South Jeolla	215	163		5	2	45
North Gyeongsang	251	21	192			38
South Gyeongsang	234	67	149			18
Total	2,601	1,218	1,216	17	6	144
Source: National Election Commission

=== Proportional representation seats ===
Province/City	Seats	PPP	DPK	JP
Seoul	54	30	24	
Busan	25	16	9	
Daegu	16	12	4	
Incheon	15	9	6	
Gwangju	9		9	
Daejeon	8	5	3	
Ulsan	6	5	1	
Gyeonggi	57	33	24	
Gangwon	23	20	3	
North Chungcheong	17	13	4	
South Chungcheong	26	16	10	
North Jeolla	25	3	22	
South Jeolla	32	1	30	1
North Gyeongsang	37	33	4	
South Gyeongsang	36	23	13	
Total	386	219	166	1
Source: National Election Commission
