= Song Ha-jin =

South Korean politician (born 1952)

- 송하진
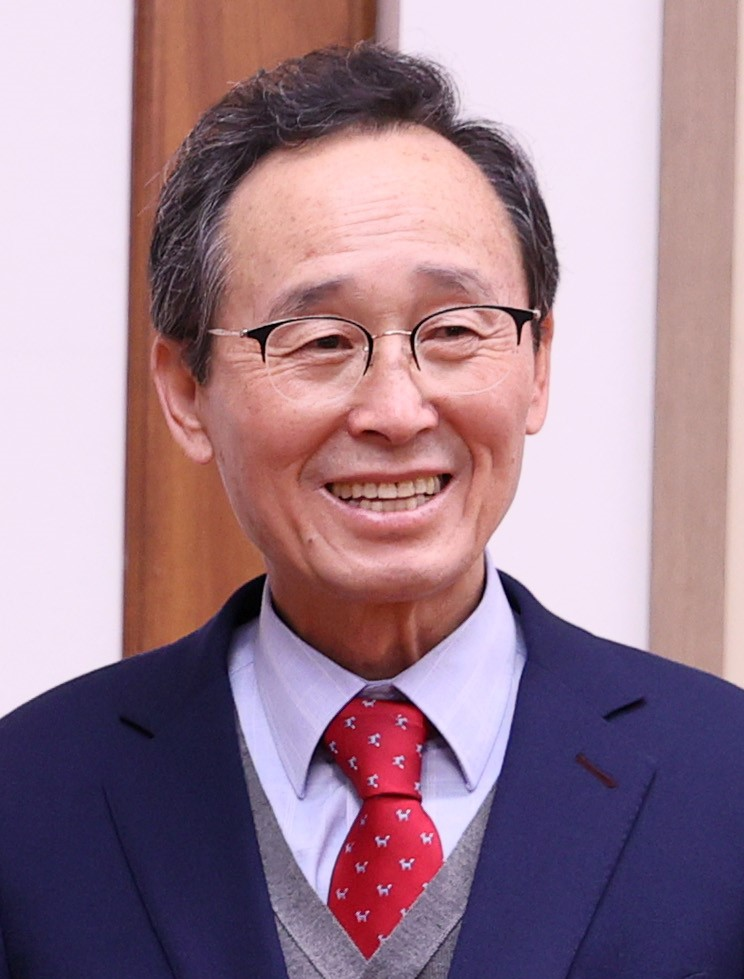

33rd Governor of North Jeolla Province
- In office 1 July 2014 – 30 June 2022
- Preceded by: Kim Wan-ju
- Succeeded by: Kim Kwan-young

Mayor of Jeonju
- In office 1 July 2006 – 3 March 2014
- Preceded by: Kim Wan-ju
- Succeeded by: Kim Seung-soo

Personal details
- Born: 29 April 1952 (age 74) Gimje, North Jeolla, South Korea
- Party: Democratic
- Education: Korea University
- Website: Song Ha-jin's Blog

Korean name
- Hangul: 송하진
- Hanja: 宋河珍
- RR: Song Hajin
- MR: Song Hajin

Song Ha-jin (Korean: 송하진; born 29 April 1952) is a South Korean politician who served as the governor of North Jeolla Province from 2014 to 2022.

== Election results ==
=== Local elections ===
==== Governor of North Jeolla ====
Year	Elections	Constituency	Political party	Votes (%)	Results
2014	6th Iocal Election	North Jeolla (Governoral Elections)	NPAD	599,654 (69.23%)	Won
2018	7th Iocal Election	North Jeolla (Governoral Elections)	Democratic (2015)	682,042 (70.57%)	Won

==== Mayor of North Jeolla Jeonju ====
Year	Elections	Constituency	Political party	Votes (%)	Remarks
2006	4th Iocal Election	Mayor of North Jeolla Jeonju	Uri	108,164 (50.92%)	Won
2010	5th Iocal Election	Mayor of North Jeolla Jeonju	Democratic (2008)	159,675 (65.36%)	Won

Political offices
Preceded by Kim Wan-ju	Governor of North Jeolla Province; 2014–present	Succeeded by Incumbent
