= Lee Jung-hyun (politician) =

South Korean politician

- 이정현
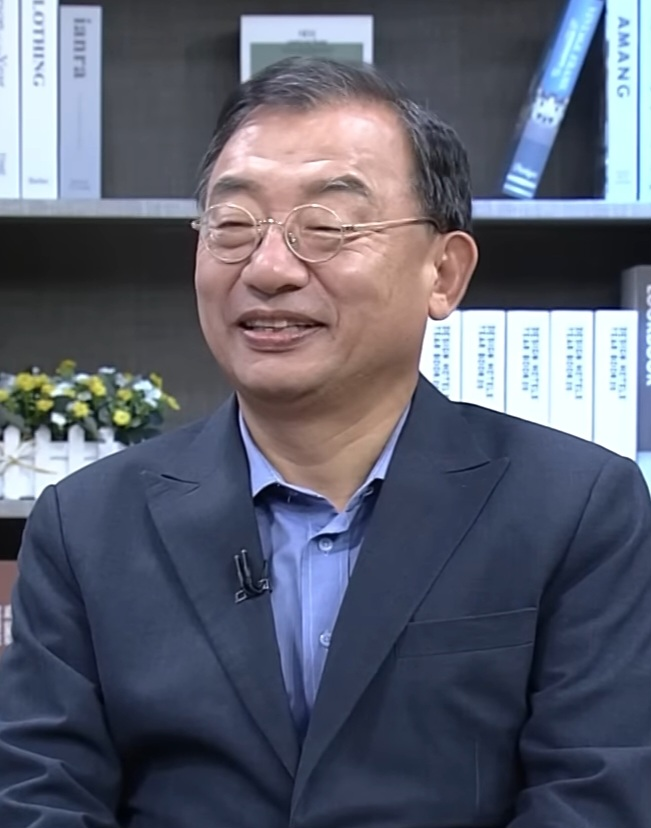

Chairman of the Saenuri Party
- In office 9 August 2016 – 16 December 2016
- Preceded by: Kim Moo-sung; Won Yoo-chul (Acting); Chung Jin-suk (Acting); Kim Hee-ok (Interim)
- Succeeded by: Chung Woo-taik (Acting); In Myung-jin (Interim); Chung Woo-taik (Interim); Hong Joon-pyo

Member of the National Assembly
- In office 31 July 2014 – 29 May 2020
- Preceded by: Kim Sun-dong
- Succeeded by: So Byung-chul (Suncheon-Gwangyang-Gokseong-Gurye A); Seo Dong-yong (Suncheon-Gwangyang-Gokseong-Gurye B)
- Constituency: Suncheon (–Gokseong until 2016)
- In office 30 May 2008 – 29 May 2012
- Constituency: Proportional representation

Personal details
- Born: 1 September 1958 (age 68) Gokseong, South Jeolla Province, South Korea
- Party: People Power
- Other political affiliations: DJP (1984-1990); DLP·NKP (1990-1997); GNP·Saenuri (1997-2017); Independent (2017-2022)

- Lee Jung-hyun
- Hangul: 이정현
- Hanja: 李貞鉉
- RR: I Jeonghyeon
- MR: I Chŏnghyŏn

Lee Jung-hyun (Korean: 이정현; born 1 September 1958) is a South Korean politician. He was a member of the National Assembly and the delegate of Saenuri Party. He is also known as the first Jeolla Province born delegate of the conservative Saenuri Party since democratization in the 1980s, and widely regarded to have broken the regional discrimination in his Gyeongsang Province-oriented party as the party's first chairman from Jeolla regions. He is also regarded as one of President Park's closet aides, and this has stirred substantial unease recently during President Park's scandals in late 2016.

== Election results ==
=== General elections ===
Year	Elections	Constituency	Political party	Votes (%)	Results
2004	17th National Assembly General Election	Seo B (Gwangju)	GNP	720 (1.03%)	Defeated (5th)
2008	18th National Assembly General Election	Proportional representation (22nd)	GNP	6,421,727 (37.48%)	Elected
2012	19th National Assembly General Election	Seo B (Gwangju)	Saenuri	28,314 (39.70%)	Defeated (2nd)
2014	2014 By-election	Suncheon–Gokseong (South Jeolla)	Saenuri	60,815 (49.43%)	Won
2016	20th National Assembly General Election	Suncheon (South Jeolla)	Saenuri	66,981 (44.54%)	Won
2020	21st National Assembly General Election	Yeongdeungpo B (Seoul)	Independent	3,311 (3.53%)	Defeated (3rd)
2024	22nd National Assembly General Election	Suncheon–Gwangyang–Gokseong–Gurye B (South Jeolla)	PPP	35,283 (23.66%)	Defeated (2nd)

=== Local elections ===
==== Governor of South Jeolla ====
Year	Elections	Constituency	Political party	Votes (%)	Remarks
2022	8th Iocal Election	South Jeolla (Governoral Elections)	PPP	167,020 (18.81%)	Defeated (2nd)

==== Mayor of Jeonnam-Gwangju ====
Year	Elections	Constituency	Political party	Votes (%)	Remarks
2026	9th Iocal Election	Mayor of Jeonnam-Gwangju (Mayoral Elections)	PPP	189,718 (11.68%)	Defeated (2nd)

==== Gwangju Metropolitan Council ====
Year	Elections	Constituency	Political party	Votes (%)	Remarks
1995	1st Iocal Election	Gwangju Gwangsan 2nd	DLP	2,686 (10.05%)	Defeated (2nd)
