= Jeju Provincial Council =

Jeju Special Self-Governing Provincial Council 제주특별자치도의회
- 12th Jeju Special Self-Governing Provincial Council

Type
- Type: Unicameral

History
- Founded: 20 May 1952

Leadership
- Chairman: Kim Kyeong-hak, Democratic
- Vice Chairman: Kim Dae-jin, Democratic
- Vice Chairman: Kim Hwang-guk, People Power

Structure
- Seats: 45
- Political groups: Democratic (27) People Power (12) Independents (1) Education members (5)
- Length of term: 4 years

Elections
- Voting system: Parallel voting: First-past-the-post (32 seats, 5 education members); Party-list proportional representation (8 seats)
- Last election: 1 June 2022

Website
- Jeju Special Self-Governing Provincial Council (Korean); Jeju Special Self-Governing Provincial Council (English)

- Jeju Provincial Council
- Hangul: 제주특별자치도의회
- Hanja: 濟州特別自治道議會
- RR: Jeju-teukbyeoljachido uihoe
- MR: Cheju-t'ŭkpyŏljach'ido ŭihoe

The Jeju Provincial Council, officially the Jeju Special Self-Governing Provincial Council (Korean: 제주특별자치도의회) is the local council of Jeju Province, South Korea.

There are a total of 43 members, with 31 members elected in the first-past-the-post voting system and 7 members elected in party-list proportional representation. In addition, five education members are also elected under the First-past-the-post voting system.

== Current composition ==
Political party	Seats
Democratic	27
People Power	12
Independents	1
Education member	5
Total	45

Negotiation groups can be formed by four or more members.

== Organization ==
The structure of Council consists of:

- Chairman
- Two Vice-chairmen
- Standing Committees
  - Council Operation Committee
  - Autonomy Administration Committee
  - Health, Welfare and Safety Committee
  - Environment and City Committee
  - Culture, Tourism, and Sports Committee
  - Economic Committee for Agricultural, Fishery, Livestock
  - Educational Committee
- Special Committees
  - Special Committee on Budget and Accounts
  - Special Committee on Ethics
  - Special Committee on 4.3
  - Special Committee on Administrative investigation

== Recent election results ==
=== 2018 ===
Summary of the 13 June 2018 Jeju Provincial Council election results
Party	Constituency				Party list				Education member				Total seats	
Party	Votes	%	Seats	±	Votes	%	Seats	±	Votes	%	Seats	±	Seats	±
Democratic Party of Korea	167,815	53.65	25	▲12	185,218	54.25	4	▲1	—N/a				29	▲13
Liberty Korea Party	49,096	15.70	1	▼12	61,705	18.07	1	▼3	—N/a				2	▼15
Bareunmirae Party	9,588	3.07	1	new	25,503	7.47	1	new	—N/a				2	new
Justice Party	5,332	1.70	0	0	40,553	11.87	1	▲1	—N/a				1	▲1
Green Party Korea	—N/a				16,640	4.87	0	0	—N/a				0	0
Labor Party	—N/a				6,277	1.83	0	new	—N/a				0	new
Minjung Party	878	0.27	0	new	5,496	1.60	0	new	—N/a				0	new
Independents	80,093	25.61	4	▲1	—N/a				90,244	100.00	5	–	9	▲1
Total	312,802	100.00	31	–	341,392	100.00	7	–	90,244	100.00	5	–	43	–
