= 2017 Liberty Korea Party leadership election =

Political party leadership election

- 3 July 2017
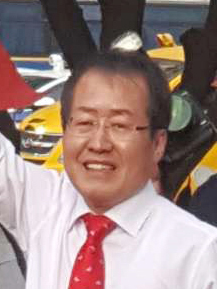

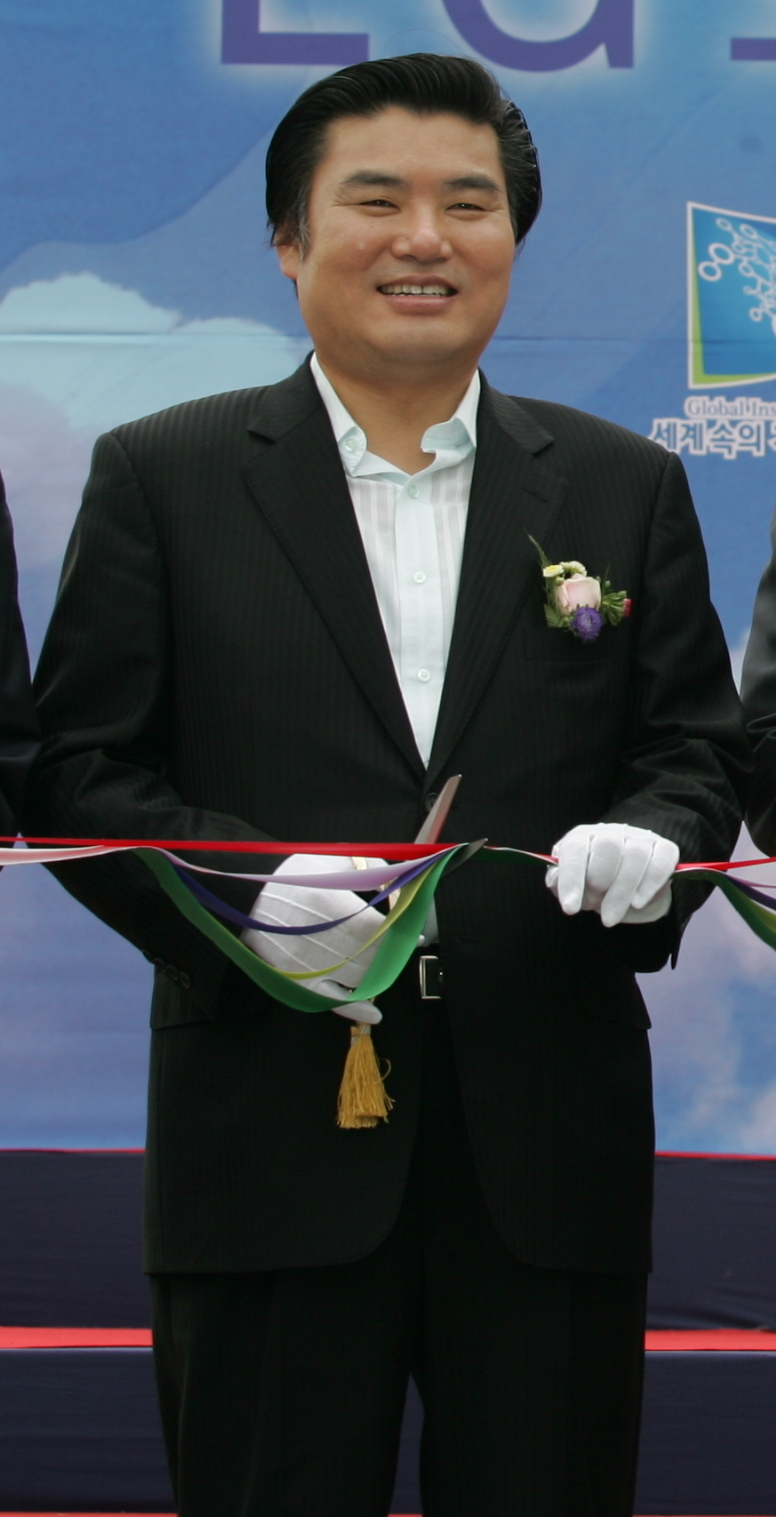

Candidate	Hong Jun-pyo	Won Yoo-chul	Shin Sang-jin
Delegate count	40,194	11,021	4,036
Opinion poll	11,697	7,103	4,877
Total	51,891	18,125	8,914
Leader before election
Chung Woo-taik (Acting)
Elected Leader
Hong Jun-pyo

The Liberty Korea Party held a leadership election on 3 July 2017. It was the first election since the Liberty Korea Party became an opposition party.

== Candidates ==
=== Running ===
- Shin Sang-jin, member of the National Assembly.
- Hong Jun-pyo, former Governor of South Gyeongsang Province, former member of the National Assembly, former leader of the party, former Floor leader of the party.
- Won Yoo-chul, member of the National Assembly, former Floor leader of the party.

== Results ==
The ratio of the results by sector was 70% for delegates, 30% for opinion poll.

Final results
Candidate	Delegates	Opinion poll	Total points
Hong Jun-pyo	40,194 (72.7%)	49.4% (11,697 pts)	51,891 (65.7%)
Won Yoo-chul	11,021 (19.9%)	30.0% (7,103 pts)	18,125 (23.0%)
Shin Sang-jin	4,036 (7.3%)	20.6% (4,877 pts)	8,914 (11.3%)
Total	55,251	23,677 pts	78,930
