= Oh Young-hun =

South Korean politician (born 1969)

- 오영훈
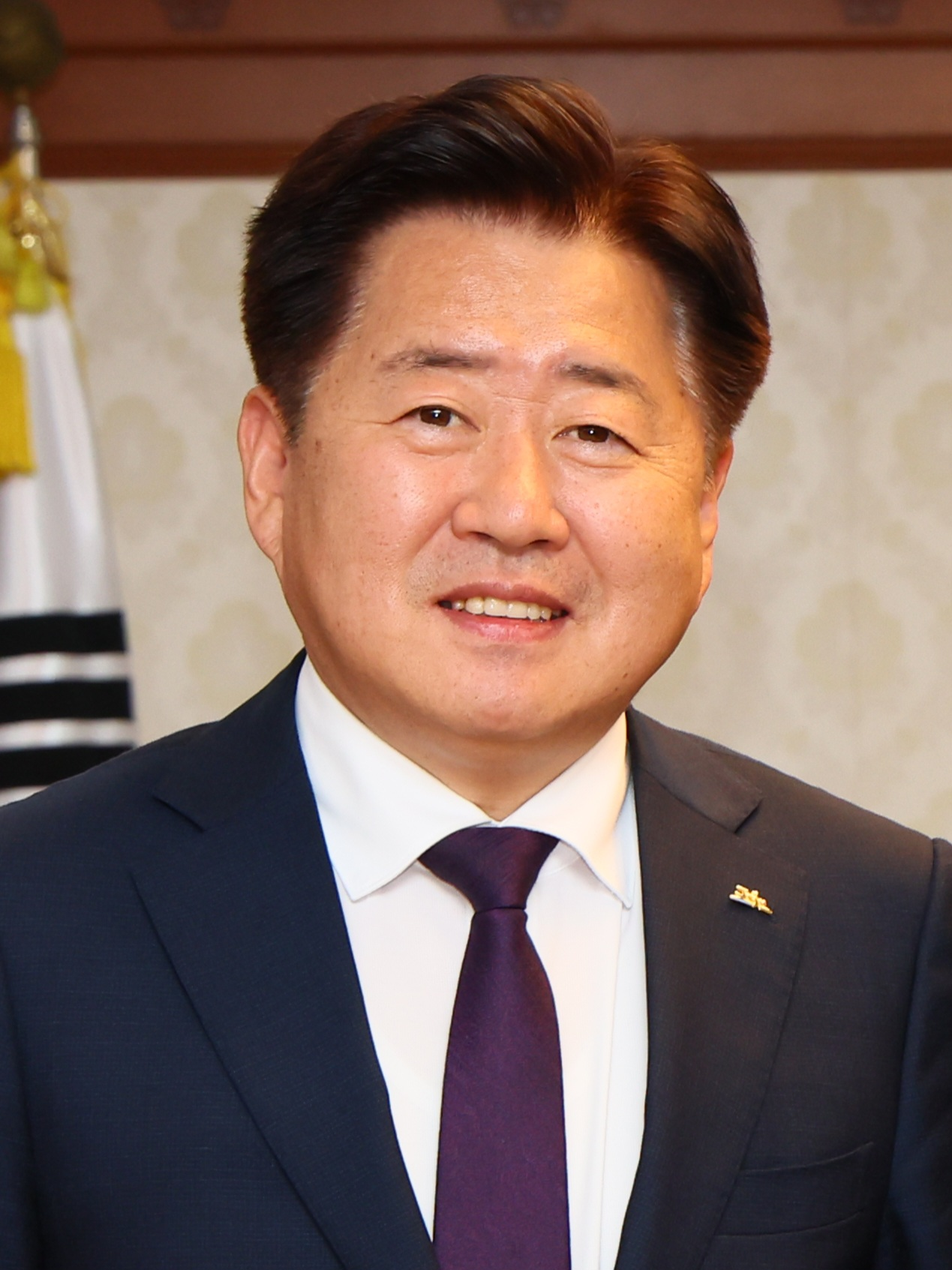
- Oh in 2024

Governor of Jeju Province
- In office 1 July 2022 – 30 June 2026
- Preceded by: Won Hee-ryong (2014-2021); Ku Man-sub (Acting)
- Succeeded by: Wi Seong-gon

Member of the National Assembly
- In office 30 May 2016 – 29 April 2022
- Constituency: Jeju B (Jeju)

Personal details
- Born: 31 January 1969 (age 57) Namjeju County, Jeju Province, South Korea
- Party: Democratic
- Education: Jeju National University

Korean name
- Hangul: 오영훈
- Hanja: 吳怜勳
- RR: O Yeonghun
- MR: O Yŏnghun

Oh Young-hun (Korean: 오영훈; born 31 January 1969) is a South Korean politician who served as the governor of Jeju Province from 2022 to 2026. He previously served as member of the National Assembly from 2016 to 2022. Oh's resignation as member of the National Assembly was accepted on April 29, 2022, due to his candidacy for the governor of Jeju Province in the 2022 local election.

== Early life and career ==
Oh Young-hun was born on 14 December 1968 in Namjeju County (now Seogwipo), Jeju Province. He graduated from Jeju National University.

== Political career ==
Oh served as a member of the Jeju Provincial Council from 2006 to 2011.

In 2016, he was nominated by the Democratic Party in the legislative election and was elected in Jeju City, Jeju Province.

== Election results ==
=== General elections ===
Year	Elections	Constituency	Political party	Votes (%)	Results
2016	20th National Assembly General Election	Jeju B (Jeju)	Democratic	44,338 (45.19%)	Won
2020	21st National Assembly General Election	Jeju B (Jeju)	Democratic	67,206 (55.35%)	Won

=== Local elections ===
==== Governor of Jeju ====
Year	Elections	Constituency	Political party	Votes (%)	Remarks
2022	8th Iocal Election	Jeju (Governoral Elections)	Democratic	163,116 (55.14%)	Won

==== Jeju Special Self-Governing Provincial Council ====
Year	Elections	Constituency	Political party	Votes (%)	Remarks
2002	3rd Iocal Election	Jeju 1st	MDP	5,689 (29.86%)	Defeated
2006	4th Iocal Election	Jeju 2nd	Uri	3,146 (36.66%)	Won
2010	5th Iocal Election	Jeju 2nd	Democratic	5,076 (59.43%)	Won
