= Park Wan-su =

South Korean politician (born 1955)

- 박완수
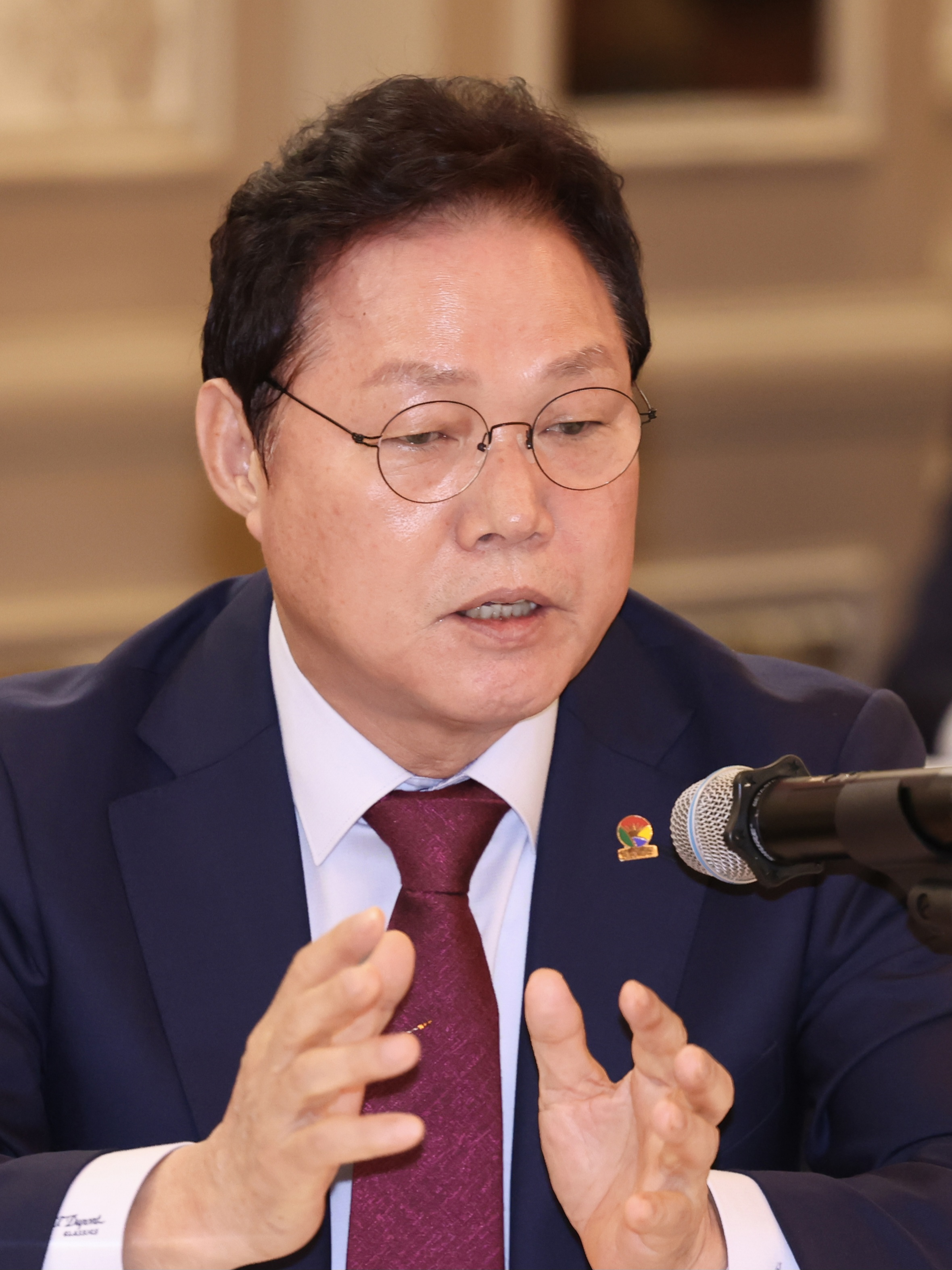
- Park in 2024

Governor of South Gyeongsang Province
- Incumbent
- Assumed office 1 July 2022
- Preceded by: Kim Kyoung-soo; Ha Byung-pil (acting)

Secretary-General of the United Future Party
- In office 17 February 2020 – 28 May 2020
- President: Hwang Kyo-ahn; Shim Jae-chul (acting); Joo Ho-young (acting); Kim Chong-in (acting)
- Preceded by: Position established
- Succeeded by: Kim Seon-dong

Secretary-General of the Liberty Korea Party
- In office 2 December 2019 – 17 February 2020
- President: Hwang Kyo-ahn
- Preceded by: Park Maeng-woo
- Succeeded by: Position abolished

Member of the National Assembly
- In office 30 May 2016 – 29 April 2022
- Preceded by: Park Sung-ho
- Succeeded by: Kim Yeong-seon
- Constituency: Changwon Uichang (South Gyeongsang)

President of the Incheon International Airport Corporation
- In office 7 October 2014 – 19 December 2015
- Preceded by: Chung Chang-soo
- Succeeded by: Chung Il-young

Mayor of Changwon
- In office 6 June 2004 – 5 February 2014
- Preceded by: Bae Han-sung; Ha Sam-seok (interim)
- Succeeded by: Kim Seok-ki (interim); Ahn Sang-soo

Mayor of Hapcheon
- In office 3 November 1994 – 30 June 1995
- Preceded by: Lee Bang-soo
- Succeeded by: Kang Suk-jung

Personal details
- Born: 10 August 1955 (age 71) Tongyeong, South Gyeongsang, South Korea
- Party: People Power
- Other political affiliations: Independent (2002–2004); GNP (2004–2012); Saenuri (2012–2017); LKP (2017–2020); UFP (2020)
- Spouse: Cha Kyung-ae
- Children: Park Chan-hyo
- Education: Kyungnam University
- Occupation: Politician

Korean name
- Hangul: 박완수
- Hanja: 朴完洙
- RR: Bak Wansu
- MR: Pak Wansu

Park Wan-su (Korean: 박완수; born 10 August 1955) is a South Korean politician who has served as the governor of South Gyeongsang Province since 2022. A member of the People Power Party, he was the National Assembly member for South Gyeongsang Changwon Uichang from 2016 to 2022. He was also the secretary-general of the United Future Party (UFP) in 2020.

Prior to his parliamentary career, Park served as the mayor of Hapcheon from 1994 to 1995 and of Changwon from 2004 to 2014. He served as the President of the Incheon International Airport Corporation from 2014 to 2015.

== Early life and education ==
Park was born in Tongyeong on 10 August 1955. As a son of a poor peasant, he barely graduated from primary school and was unable to continue his secondary education. He has an elder brother and 3 elder sister.

After graduated from Masan Technical High School, Park used to work at Dongkyung Electronics. He then attended to Korea National Open University and Kyungnam University.

== Political career ==
Park served as the mayor of Hapcheon from 1994 to 1995. When direct elections were applied for all mayorships in 1995, he then became the last indirect Mayor.

In 2002, he ran as an independent candidate for Changwon mayorship but lost to Bae Han-sung. After Bae's election was nullified in 2004, he joined the Grand National Party and was elected. He was then re-elected in 2006 and again in 2010. He also became the first Mayor of the united Changwon, after the city was merged with Masan and Jinhae.

Following the resignation of Kim Doo-kwan prior to the 2012 presidential election, Park contested Saenuri preselection for the South Gyeongsang governorship but lost to Hong Jun-pyo. In 2014, he resigned from the Mayor of Changwon and again contested Saenuri preselection, but was also defeated to Hong. During this time, he harshly criticised Hong with issues regarding Jinju Medical Centre.

Park was appointed as the President of the Incheon International Airport Corporation in October 2014 but resigned after a year in order to run for 2016 election. He was selected as the Saenuri candidate for Changwon Uichang and defeated Kim Ki-woon of the Democratic Party.

On 2 December 2019, Park was appointed as the Secretary-General of the Liberty Korea Party. After the party was merged into the United Future Party, he was re-appointed Secretary-General.

On 22 April 2022, Park won PPP preselection for South Gyeongsang Governorship.

== Election results ==
=== General elections ===
| Year | Elections | Constituency | Political party | Votes (%) | Remarks |
|---|---|---|---|---|---|
| 2016 | 20th National Assembly General Election | Changwon Uichang (South Gyeongsang) | Saenuri | 64,845 (56.61%) | Won |
| 2020 | 21st National Assembly General Election | Changwon Uichang (South Gyeongsang) | UFP | 88,718 (59.04%) | Won |

=== Local elections ===
==== Governor of South Gyeongsang ====
| Year | Elections | constituency | Political party | Votes (%) | Remarks |
|---|---|---|---|---|---|
| 2022 | 8th Iocal Election | South Gyeongsang (Governoral Elections) | PPP | 963,473 (65.70%) | Won |
| 2026 | 9th Iocal Election | South Gyeongsang (Governoral Elections) | PPP | 897,975 (51.28%) | Won |

==== Mayor of South Gyeongsang Changwon ====
| Year | Elections | constituency | Political party | Votes (%) | Remarks |
|---|---|---|---|---|---|
| 2002 | 3rd Iocal Election | Mayor of South Gyeongsang Changwon | Independent | 43,757 (26.57%) | Defeated (2nd) |
| 2004 | 2004 By-election | Mayor of South Gyeongsang Changwon | GNP | 77,639 (67.80%) | Won |
| 2006 | 4th Iocal Election | Mayor of South Gyeongsang Changwon | GNP | 124,228 (68.10%) | Won |
| 2010 | 5th Iocal Election | Mayor of South Gyeongsang Changwon | GNP | 268,055 (55.16%) | Won |
