= Yeo Yeong-gug =

South Korean politician (born 1965)

- 여영국
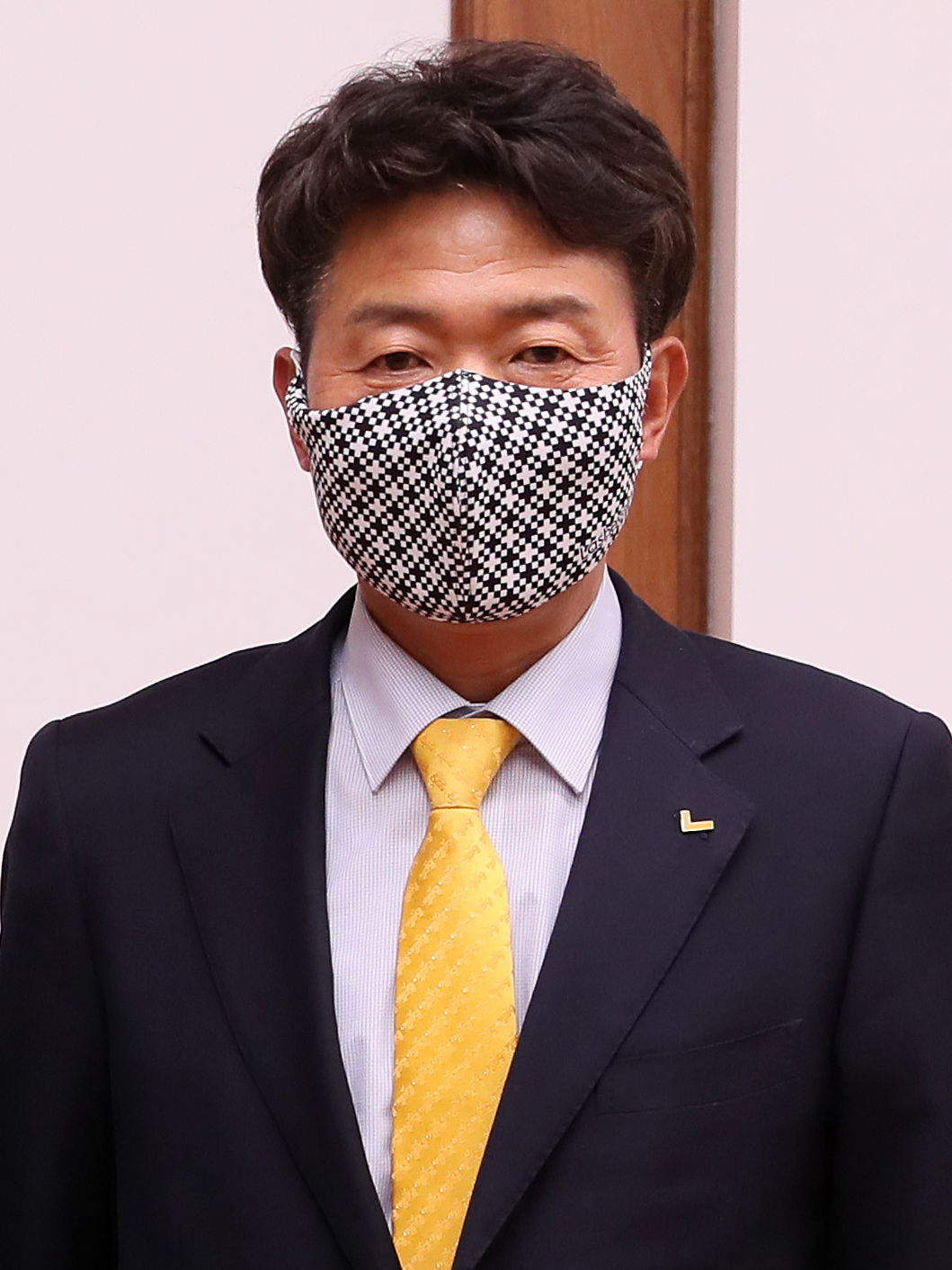
- Yeo in 2021

Leader of the Justice Party
- In office 23 March 2021 – 2 June 2022
- Preceded by: Kang Eun-mi (acting)
- Succeeded by: Lee Eun-ju (acting); Lee Jeong-mi

Member of the National Assembly
- In office 4 April 2019 – 29 May 2020
- Preceded by: Roh Hoe-chan
- Succeeded by: Kang Gi-yun
- Constituency: Seongsan, Changwon

Personal details
- Born: 28 January 1965 (age 61) Sacheon, South Gyeongsang, South Korea
- Party: Justice Party
- Education: Changwon National University
- Occupation: Trade unionist
- Website: Official website

Korean name
- Hangul: 여영국
- Hanja: 余永國
- RR: Yeo Yeongguk
- MR: Yŏ Yŏngguk

Yeo Yeong-gug (Korean: 여영국; born 28 January 1965) is a South Korean politician who led the Justice Party from 2021 to 2022. He was previously a member of the National Assembly from 2019 until 2020, and also served on the South Gyeongsang Provincial Council.

== Life ==
Yeo Yeong-gug was born on 28 January 1965 in Sacheon, South Gyeongsang Province. As a young man, he also worked as a senior official of the Korean Metal Workers' Union while working with labour movements.

He entered the political world, leaving the labor movement, and has since been elected as member of the South Gyeongsang Provincial Council in the 2010 local elections. He was also elected in the 2014 elections, but lost in the 2018 election. After Roh Hoe-chan's death, he ran for the by-election in the Seongsan District, Changwon. On 25 March 2019, the Democratic Party's candidate Kwon Min-ho withdrew from the by-election as a candidate and declared his support for Yeo Yeong-gug.

== Election results ==
=== General elections ===
Year	Elections	Constituency	Political party	Votes (%)	Results
2019	2019 By-election	Changwon Seongsan (South Gyeongsang)	Justice	42,663 (45.75%)	Won
2020	21st National Assembly General Election	Changwon Seongsan (South Gyeongsang)	Justice	45,567 (34.89%)	Defeated (2nd)
2024	22nd National Assembly General Election	Changwon Seongsan (South Gyeongsang)	Green Justice	11,511 (7.91%)	Defeated (3rd)

=== Local elections ===
==== Governor of South Gyeongsang ====
Year	Elections	Constituency	Political party	Votes (%)	Remarks
2022	8th Iocal Election	South Gyeongsang (Governoral Election)	Justice	58,933 (4.01%)	Defeated (3rd)

==== South Gyeongsang Province Council ====
Year	Elections	Constituency	Political party	Votes (%)	Remarks
2010	5th Iocal Election	South Gyeongsang Changwon 6th	NPP	20,567 (50.78%)	Won
2014	6th Iocal Election	South Gyeongsang Changwon 6th	Labor	20,789 (51.90%)	Won
2018	7th Iocal Election	South Gyeongsang Changwon 6th	Justice	13,994 (32.51%)	Defeated (2nd)
