= Kang Gi-yun =

South Korean politician (born 1960)

Kang Gi-yun MP
- 강기윤

Member of the National Assembly
- In office 30 May 2020 – 24 May 2024
- Preceded by: Yeo Yeong-gug
- Succeeded by: Heo Seong-moo
- Constituency: Seongsan, Changwon (South Gyeongsang)
- In office 30 May 2012 – 29 May 2016
- Preceded by: Kwon Young-ghil
- Succeeded by: Roh Hoe-chan
- Constituency: Seongsan, Changwon (South Gyeongsang)

Personal details
- Born: 4 June 1960 (age 66) Changwon, South Korea
- Party: People Power
- Education: Changwon National University

Korean name
- Hangul: 강기윤
- Hanja: 姜起潤
- RR: Gang Giyun
- MR: Kang Kiyun

Kang Gi-yun (Korean: 강기윤; born 4 June 1960) is a South Korean politician who is member of the National Assembly. He was a member of the South Gyeongsang Provincial Council from 2002 to 2007.

== Life ==
Kang Gi-yun was born on 4 June 1960 in Changwon, South Gyeongsang Province. He served as CEO of a metal industry company and also worked as a civil servant in Changwon City Government and South Gyeongsang Provincial Government.

Later, he joined the Grand National Party and won the 2002 local elections as a member of the South Gyeongsang Provincial Council. He ran in the Changwon B in the 2008 legislative election, but was defeated by Kwon Young-ghil of the Democratic Labor Party. Then he ran again for the next election and won the election for the first time. He ran for re-election in the 2016 legislative election, but was defeated by Roh Hoe-chan of the Justice Party. In July 2018, the death of Roh Hoe-chan led to by-election in Seongsan District, Changwon, where he ran again.

== Election results ==
=== General elections ===
Year	Elections	Constituency	Political party	Votes (%)	Results
2008	18th National Assembly General Election	Changwon B (South Gyeongsang)	GNP	39,667 (44.66%)	Defeated (2nd)
2012	19th National Assembly General Election	Changwon Seongsan (South Gyeongsang)	Saenuri	52,502 (49.04%)	Won
2016	20th National Assembly General Election	Changwon Seongsan (South Gyeongsang)	Saenuri	48,336 (40.21%)	Defeated (2nd)
2019	2019 By-election	Changwon Seongsan (South Gyeongsang)	LKP	42,159 (45.21%)	Defeated (2nd)
2020	21st National Assembly General Election	Changwon Seongsan (South Gyeongsang)	UFP	61,782 (47.30%)	Won
2024	22nd National Assembly General Election	Changwon Seongsan (South Gyeongsang)	PPP	66,507 (45.70%)	Defeated (2nd)

=== Local elections ===
==== Mayor of South Gyeongsang Changwon ====
Year	Elections	Constituency	Political party	Votes (%)	Remarks
2026	9th Iocal Election	Mayor of South Gyeongsang Changwon	PPP	267,359 (49.32%)	Won

==== South Gyeongsang Province Council ====
Year	Elections	Constituency	Political party	Votes (%)	Remarks
2002	3rd Iocal Election	Changwon 4th	GNP	23,914 (59.39%)	Won
2006	4th Iocal Election	Changwon 4th	GNP	28,580 (57.17%)	Won
