= Changwon Seongsan =

Constituency in South Gyeongsang, South Korea

- Single-member constituency for the National Assembly
- Location of the constituency
- District(s): Seongsan, Changwon
- Region: South Gyeongsang Province
- Electorate: 208,594 (2024)

Current constituency
- Created: 2012
- Seats: 1
- Party: Democratic Party
- Member: Huh Sung-moo
- Created from: Changwon B

Changwon Seongsan (Korean: 창원시 성산구) is a constituency of the National Assembly of South Korea. The constituency consists of Seongsan, Changwon, South Gyeongsang Province. As of 2024, 208,594 eligible voters were registered in the constituency. The constituency was organized into its current form in 2012 from the Changwon B constituency.

== List of members of the National Assembly ==
Election	Member	Party	Dates	Notes
2012	Kang Gi-yun	Saenuri	2012–2016	
2016	Roh Hoe-chan	Justice	2016–2018	Leader of the New Progressive Party (2008–2010); Floor leader of the Justice Party (2016–2018)
2019 by-election	Yeo Yeong-gug	Justice	2019–2020	
2020	Kang Gi-yun	United Future	2020–2024	
2024	Huh Sung-moo	Democratic	2024–present	

== Election results ==
=== 2024 ===
Legislative Election 2024: Changwon Seongsan
Party	Candidate	Votes	%	±%
Democratic	Huh Sung-moo	67,489	46.38	▲30.56
People Power	Kang Gi-yun	66,507	45.70	▼1.6
Green Justice	Yeo Yeong-gug	11,511	7.91	▼26.98
Rejected ballots		1,580	–	
Turnout		147,087	70.51	▼1.69
Registered electors		208,594		
Democratic gain from People Power		Swing		

=== 2020 ===
Legislative Election 2020: Changwon Seongsan
Party	Candidate	Votes	%	±%
United Future	Kang Gi-yun	61,782	47.30	+2.09
Justice	Yeo Yeong-gug	45,567	34.89	−10.86
Democratic	Lee Heung-seok	20,662	15.82	new
Minjung	Seok Yeong-cheol	1,330	1.01	−2.78
National Revolutionary	Cho Gyu-pil	723	0.55	new
Minsaeng	Koo Myeong-hoe	838	0.9	new
Rejected ballots		1,368	–	
Turnout		131,968	72.2	+21.0
Registered electors		182,830		
United Future gain from Justice		Swing		

=== 2019 (by-election) ===
By-election 2019: Changwon Seongsan
Party	Candidate	Votes	%	±%
Justice	Yeo Yeong-gug	42,663	45.8	−5.7
Liberty Korea	Kang Gi-yun	42,159	45.2	+5.0
Minjung	Son Seok-hyung	3,540	3.8	new
Bareunmirae	Lee Jae-hwan	3,334	3.6	−4.7
Patriots'	Jin Soon-jung	838	0.9	new
Independent	Kim Jong-seo	706	0.8	new
Rejected ballots		873	–	
Turnout		94,113	51.2	−14.9
Registered electors		183,934		
Justice hold		Swing		

=== 2016 ===
Legislative Election 2016: Changwon Seongsan
Party	Candidate	Votes	%	±%
Justice	Roh Hoe-chan	61,897	51.5	new
Saenuri	Kang Gi-yun	48,336	40.2	−8.8
People	Lee Jae-hwan	9,949	8.3	new
Rejected ballots		1,592	–	–
Turnout		121,774	66.1	+7.8
Registered electors		184,105		
Justice gain from Saenuri		Swing		

=== 2012 ===
Legislative Election 2012: Changwon Seongsan
Party	Candidate	Votes	%	±%
Saenuri	Kang Gi-yun	52,502	49.0	new
Unified Progressive	Son Seok-hyung	46,924	43.8	new
New Progressive	Kim Chang-geun	7,630	7.2	new
Rejected ballots		865	–	–
Turnout		107,921	58.3	
Registered electors		185,166		
Saenuri win (new seat)				

== See also ==
- List of constituencies of the National Assembly of South Korea
