= 2015 Justice Party (South Korea) leadership election =

2015 Justice Party leadership election
6–18 July 2015	2017 →
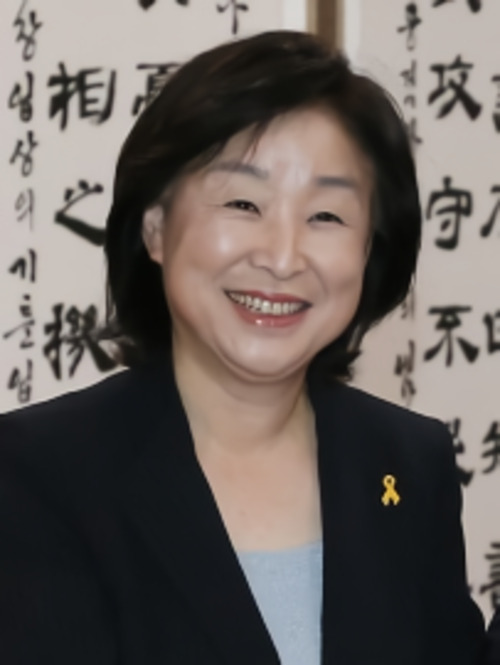

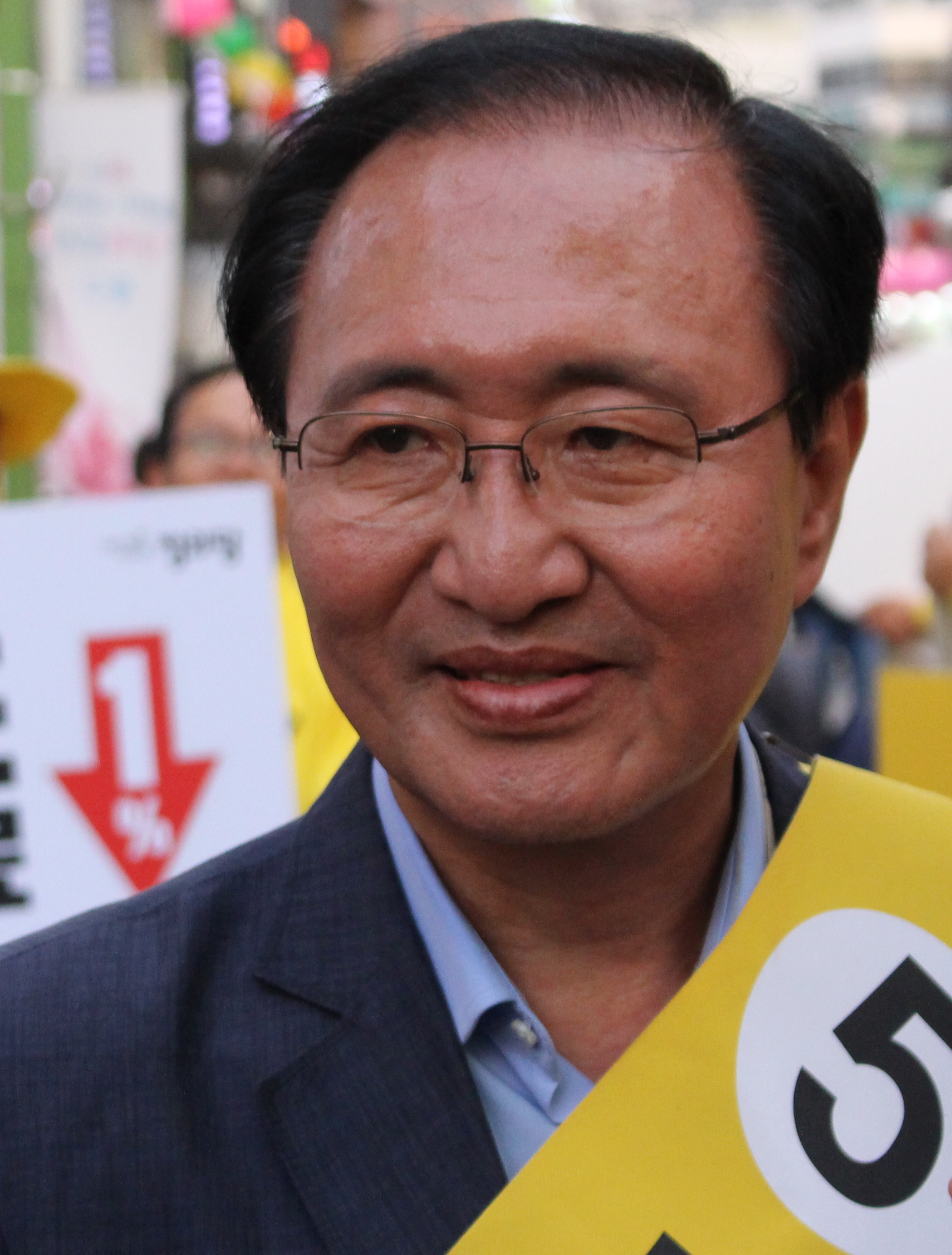
Candidate	Sim Sang-jung	Roh Hoe-chan
Members' vote	3,651	3,308
Percentage	52.5%	47.5%
Leader before election
Cheon Ho-sun
Elected Leader
Sim Sang-jung

The Justice Party held a leadership election between 6 and 18 July 2015. It was an election to elect a new leader as Cheon Ho-sun fulfilled his two-year term of office.

== Candidates ==
=== Running ===
- Roh Hoe-chan, former member of the National Assembly.
- Noh Hang-rae
- Sim Sang-jung, member of the National Assembly, former floor leader of the party.
- Cho Sung-joo

== Results ==
The election was held only by the votes of the party members. The first round of voting was held from 6 to 11 July 2015. Candidate Roh Hoe-chan and Sim Sang-jung, who won the first and second votes respectively, entered the final vote. The final round of voting was held from 11 to 18 July 2015.

First round (6–11 July) results
Candidate	On-line vote	Off-line vote	ARS vote	Total votes
Roh Hoe-chan	2,762 (42.7%)	31 (32%)	386 (46.3%)	3,179 (43%)
Sim Sang-jung	1,985 (30.7%)	49 (50.5%)	278 (33.4%)	2,312 (31.2%)
Cho Sung-joo	1,136 (17.6%)	10 (10.3%)	121 (14.5%)	1,267 (17.1%)
Noh Hang-rae	588 (9.1%)	7 (7.2%)	48 (5.8%)	643 (8.7%)
Total	6,471	97	833	7,401

Final round (13–18 July) results
Candidate	On-line vote	Off-line vote	ARS vote	Total votes
Sim Sang-jung	3,014 (53.2%)	42 (79.2%)	595 (47.9%)	3,651 (52.5%)
Roh Hoe-chan	2,651 (46.8%)	11 (20.8%)	646 (52.1%)	3,308 (47.5%)
Total	5,665	53	1,241	6,959
