= Lee Jung-do =

South Korean politician (born 1965)

- 이정도

Secretary to the President for Administrative Affairs
- In office 11 May 2017 – 9 May 2022
- President: Moon Jae-in
- Succeeded by: Yoon Jae-soon

Personal details
- Born: 25 December 1965 (age 60)
- Education: Changwon National University

Lee Jung-do (Korean: 이정도; Hanja: 李正道; born 25 December 1965) is a South Korean bureaucrat served as Secretary to the President for Administrative Affairs under President Moon Jae-in. He is the first bureaucrat to assume this role responsible for the budget of the Blue House.

President Moon appointed Lee im as his secretary for administrative affairs a day after his inauguration. This surprised many as Lee was a bureaucrat not a close confidant to the President. Lee's predecessors had a close relationship with their presidents and enjoyed an exceptional privilege which name them as "King secretary" or " one of Three Doorknobs."

Lee began his career in public service in 1992 when he passed the state exam. From early 2000s, he had spent most of his career at now-Ministry of Economy and Finance. From 2016 he worked at the Budget Office of the Ministry before promoted to one of secretaries to the President.

Lee holds a bachelor's degree in administration from Changwon National University.
