= Opinion polling for the 2012 South Korean presidential election =

This article is a list of opinion polls that have been taken for the 2012 South Korean presidential election. It is divided into polls for the presidential election itself, and polls for the primaries of the two main parties, Saenuri and the Democratic United Party. Two-way polls are used to demonstrate the popularity of one candidate with respect to the other, but the election itself will have no run-off round and will be held under a system of First Past the Post. The polls are ordered by date, with the newest at the top.

== General election ==
=== Two-candidate race ===
==== Park Geun-hye vs. Ahn Cheol-soo ====
Poll source	Date	Sample size			Margin
Poll source	Date	Sample size	Park (%) Saenuri	Ahn (%) Independent	Margin
Hankyoreh/Korea Society Opinion Institute	27–28 July 2012	1,000	44.9	48.8	3.9
Gallup	23–27 July 2012	1,520	42	42	0
Realmeter	23–27 July 2012	3,750	44.2	48.4	4.2
JoongAng Ilbo	19–21 July 2012	2,000	49.3	45.2	4.1
Realmeter	16–20 July 2012	3,750	47.7	44.8	2.9
OhMyNews/Research View	16–17 July 2012	1,000	48.7	46.5	2.2
Realmeter	25–29 June 2012	3,750	49.0	43.8	5.2
Realmeter	18–22 June 2012	3,750	49.2	44.3	4.9
Realmeter	29 May – 1 June 2012	3,000	48.6	45.6	3.0
Hankyoreh/Korea Society Opinion Institute	26–27 May 2012	800	53.5	43.7	9.8
Realmeter	21–25 May 2012	3,750	48.5	44.7	3.8
JoongAng Ilbo	15 May 2012	910	51.9	43.0	8.9
Realmeter	14–18 May 2012	3,750	48.8	43.9	4.9
Realmeter	7–11 May 2012	3,750	47.6	45.6	2.0
Realmeter	7–8 May 2012	1,500	51.3	40.7	10.6
Chosun Ilbo / Media Research	2–6 May 2012	1,000	47.2	42.1	5.1
Realmeter	30 Apr – 4 May 2012	3,000	47.9	45.7	2.2
Gallup	30 Apr – 4 May 2012	1,272	47.0	37.0	10.0
Realmeter	23–27 April 2012	3,750	47.1	46.9	0.2
Realmeter	16–20 April 2012	3,750	49.2	45.0	4.2
Realmeter	12–13 April 2012	1,500	47.9	44.8	3.1
JoongAng Ilbo / Gallup	12–13 April 2012	800	45.1	35.9	9.2
Realmeter	6–10 February 2012	3,750	41.3	49.5	8.2
Realmeter	30 Jan – 3 Feb 2012	3,750	40.4	51.5	11.1

==== Park Geun-hye vs. Kim Doo-kwan ====
Poll source	Date	Sample size			Margin
Poll source	Date	Sample size	Park (%) Saenuri	Kim (%) DUP	Margin
JoongAng Ilbo	19–21 July 2012	2,000	68.5	20.6	47.9

==== Park Geun-hye vs. Moon Jae-in ====
Poll source	Date	Sample size			Margin
Poll source	Date	Sample size	Park (%) Saenuri	Moon (%) DUP	Margin
JoongAng Ilbo	19–21 July 2012	2,000	56.6	35.0	11.6
OhMyNews/Research View	16–17 July 2012	1,000	50.8	41.0	9.8
Realmeter	29 May – 1 Jun 2012	3,000	52.5	38.6	13.9
Hankyoreh /Korea Society Opinion Institute	26–27 May 2012		61.0	33.5	27.5
Realmeter	21–25 May 2012	3,750	52.6	37.9	14.7
JoongAng Ilbo	15 May 2012	910	57.6	33.3	24.3
Realmeter	14–18 May 2012	3,750	52.0	37.5	14.5
Realmeter	7–11 May 2012	3,750	51.9	38.2	13.7
Realmeter	7–8 May 2012	1,500	55.7	36.3	19.4
Realmeter	30 Apr – 4 May 2012	3,000	52.4	38.0	14.4
Realmeter	23–27 April 2012	3,750	50.9	40.3	10.6
Realmeter	6–10 February 2012	3,750	44.3	43.0	1.3
Realmeter	30 Jan – 3 Feb 2012	3,750	44.4	44.9	0.5
Donga Ilbo	24 January 2012		46.7	38.4	8.3

==== Park Geun-hye vs. Sohn Hak-kyu ====
Poll source	Date	Sample size			Margin
Poll source	Date	Sample size	Park (%) Saenuri	Sohn (%) DUP	Margin
JoongAng Ilbo	19–21 July 2012	2,000	67.4	23.9	43.5

=== Multiple-candidate race ===
Candidate												
Candidate	Ahn Cheol-soo	Chung Dong-young	Chung Mong-joon	Chung Sye-kyun	Chung Un-chan	Kim Doo-kwan	Kim Moon-soo	Lee Hoi-chang	Moon Jae-in	Park Geun-hye	Rhyu Si-min	Sohn Hak-kyu
Realmeter; 29 May – 1 Jun 2012	22.1%	1.7%	2.1%	–	–	2.2%	3.2%	2.4%	13.8%	40.4%	1.7%	3.6%
Korea Society Opinion Institute; 26–27 May 2012	22.6%	1.5%	2.4%	–	–	1.7%	1.9%	–	11.1%	43.0%	2.7%	1.9%
Realmeter; 21–25 May 2012	19.9%	2.2%	3.1%	0.7%	1.1%	2.1%	2.7%	2.1%	13.7%	40.5%	3.2%	3.0%
JoongAng Ilbo; 15 May 2012	23.3%	1.1%	2.5%	–	–	1.7%	1.9%	1.3%	9.9%	39.3%	1.1%	2.0%
Realmeter; 14–18 May 2012	20.7%	1.8%	2.2%	1.0%	1.9%	2.6%	2.5%	1.4%	13.4%	41.9%	2.4%	3.2%
Realmeter; 7–11 May 2012	23.8%	1.7%	2.9%	–	1.6%	2.2%	2.0%	1.8%	12.3%	40.3%	2.0%	3.4%
Media Research; 1–6 May 2012	22.0%	0.8%	1.3%	0.3%	0.4%	1.0%	1.4%	1.6%	9.6%	35.8%	1.5%	1.5%
Realmeter; 30 Apr – 4 May 2012	22.2%	2.3%	2.8%	–	1.0%	2.1%	2.5%	1.7%	13.5%	40.0%	2.1%	3.2%
Realmeter; 23–27 Apr 2012	24.0%	1.3%	2.4%	–	0.9%	2.0%	2.8%	1.8%	13.1%	40.3%	2.5%	3.6%
Korea Society Opinion Institute; 21 April 2012	23.8%	0.9%	1.3%	–	–	0.6%	2.6%	0.9%	11.1%	40.6%	1.2%	1.6%
Realmeter; 16–20 Apr 2012	23.9%	1.3%	1.8%	–	1.2%	1.4%	1.5%	1.7%	13.5%	42.1%	2.6%	3.5%
Realmeter; 12–13 Apr 2012	20.7%	2.0%	1.8%	1.1%	1.3%	–	1.5%	2.4%	16.5%	42.5%	2.3%	3.2%
Realmeter; 2–6 Apr 2012	18.3%	2.6%	2.5%	1.3%	2.5%	–	2.7%	1.9%	19.1%	36.6%	3.1%	3.2%
Korea Society Opinion Institute; 31 March 2012	17.2%	2.1%	1.1%	–	–	0.4%	1.6%	1.6%	16.3%	36.2%	1.8%	2.4%
Realmeter; 6–10 Feb 2012	20.8%	2.4%	2.5%	0.8%	2.6%	–	2.8%	2.6%	19.4%	31.3%	3.1%	3.1%
Realmeter; 30 Jan – 3 Feb 2012	21.1%	–	–	–	–	–	3.2%	–	19.3%	31.2%	3.6%	4.7%

== Saenuri primary ==
Poll source	Date	Sample size	Ahn Sang-soo	Chung Mong-joon	Chung Un-chan	Kim Moon-soo	Lee Jae-oh	Park Geun-hye	Yim Tae-hee
Hankyoreh/Korea Society Opinion Institute	21 April 2012	800	–	5.2%	0.4%	3.1%	0.2%	83.4%	–

== DUP primary ==
Poll source	Date	Sample size	Ahn Cheol-soo	Chung Dong-young	Chung Sye-kyun	Kim Doo-kwan	Moon Jae-in	Sohn Hak-kyu
Hankyoreh/Korea Society Opinion Institute	21 April 2012	800	2.3%	5.4%	2.4%	3.6%	43.4%	15.5%
