= Kim Kyoung-soo =

South Korean politician (born 1967)

- 김경수
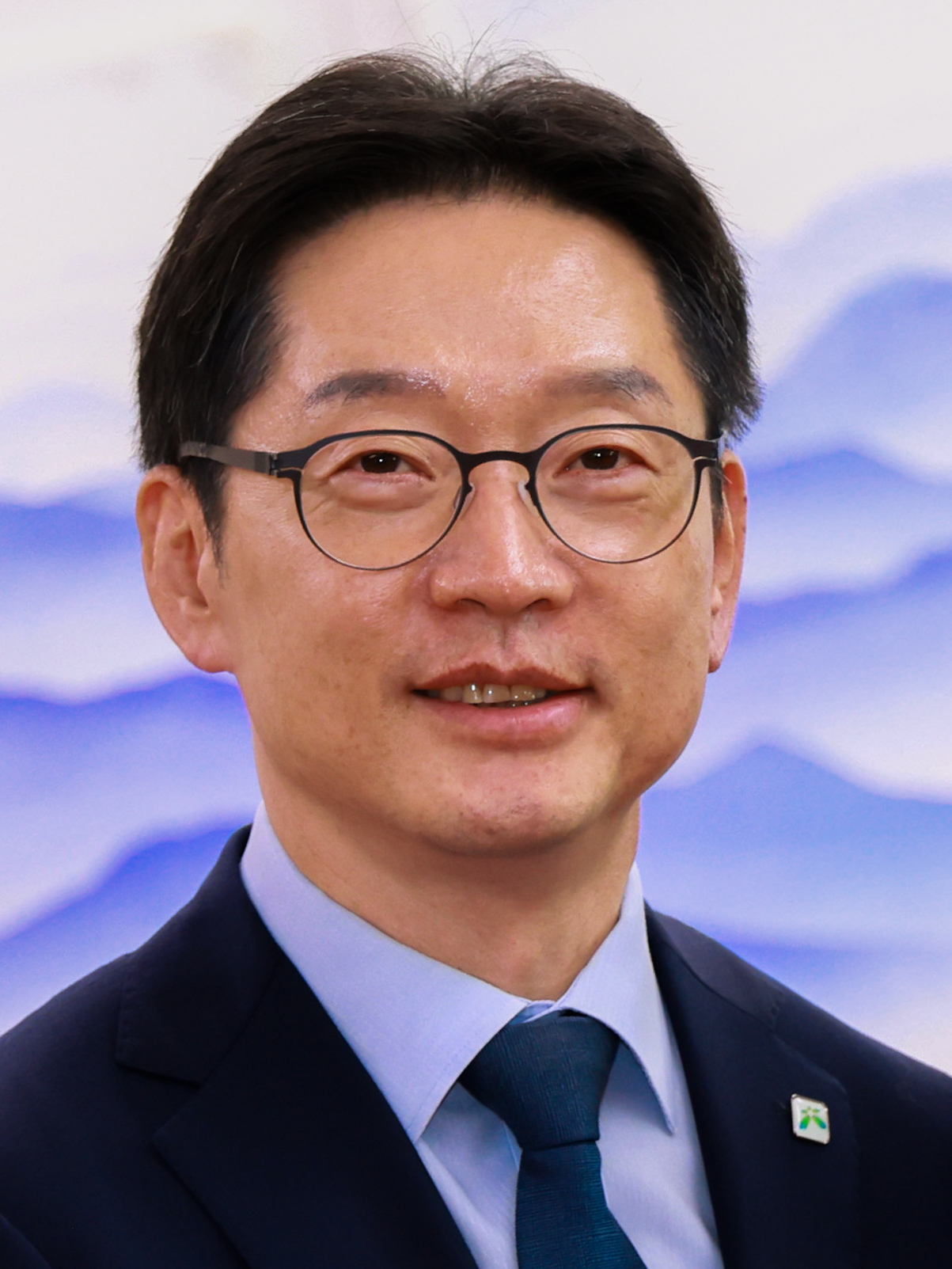
- Kim in 2025

Governor of South Gyeongsang Province
- In office 1 July 2018 – 21 July 2021
- Preceded by: Hong Joon-pyo; Ryu Soon-hyun (acting); Han Kyung-ho (acting)
- Succeeded by: Ha Byung-pil (acting); Park Wan-su

Member of the National Assembly
- In office 30 May 2016 – 14 May 2018
- Preceded by: Kim Tae-ho
- Succeeded by: Kim Jung-ho
- Constituency: Gimhae B (South Gyeongsang)

Chairman of the Presidential Committee for Decentralization and Balanced Development
- In office 29 June 2025 – 5 March 2026
- President: Lee Jae Myung
- Prime Minister: Lee Ju-ho (acting); Kim Min-Seok
- Preceded by: Woo Dong-ki
- Succeeded by: Shin Yong-han (acting); Park Jeong-hyeon

Special Advisor for Political Affairs to the President
- Incumbent
- Assumed office 30 August 2026
- President: Lee Jae Myung
- Prime Minister: Han Seong-sook

Personal details
- Born: 1 December 1967 (age 58) Goseong, South Gyeongsang, South Korea
- Party: Democratic
- Education: Seoul National University
- Religion: Roman Catholic (Christian name : Paul)

Korean name
- Hangul: 김경수
- Hanja: 金慶洙
- RR: Gim Gyeongsu
- MR: Kim Kyŏngsu

Kim Kyoung-soo (Korean: 김경수; born 1 December 1967) is a South Korean politician who served as a member of the National Assembly from 2016 to 2018 and as the Governor of South Gyeongsang Province from 2018 to 2021. His governorship ended following his conviction for involvement in opinion rigging.

== Early life ==
Born in Goseong of Gyeongsang Province, Kim spent his adolescence in Jinju. He enrolled in Seoul National University in the department of anthropology. Under the Roh Tae-woo government, Kim was sentenced to two years in prison for participating in the democracy movement, but was later released.

== Political career ==
Kim started his political career aiding lawmaker Shin Kye-ryun in 1994. In 2002, he joined the election camp of then-presidential candidate Roh Moo-hyun. After the president's suicide, Kim became the Democratic Party district chairman of Gimhae. He was elected district lawmaker in 2016 South Korean legislative election. He married a junior who studied at Seoul National University together. Kim is considered to be part of the pro-Roh group, along with the former president Moon Jae-in and former South Chungcheong Province governor Ahn Hee-jung.

In 2018, Kim was Democratic Party candidate for Governor of South Gyeongsang Province in the 2018 South Korean local elections. Kim narrowly won the election against conservative foe Kim Tae-Ho of the Liberty Korea Party. Despite his victory, Kim was suspected to have been heavily involved in the opinion rigging scandal.

In 2019, Kim was jailed for two years on charges of online-rigging operations of both the first and second order. On 21 July 2021, he was sentenced to two years by the supreme court for computer business obstruction, and eventually lost his position as governor.

In April 2025, Kim announced his candidacy for the 2025 South Korean presidential election. He ultimately finished third in the primary, placing behind Kim Dong-yeon and Lee Jae-myung. Later that day, Kim stated on Facebook: "I will run like it's my election for the victory of candidate Lee Jae-myung, the Democratic Party's success, and an overwhelming regime change."

== Election results ==
=== General elections ===
Year	Elections	Constituency	Political party	Votes (%)	Results
2012	19th National Assembly General Election	Gimhae B (South Gyeongsang)	DUP	58,157 (47.88%)	Defeated (2nd)
2016	20th National Assembly General Election	Gimhae B (South Gyeongsang)	Democratic	70,600 (62.38%)	Won

=== Local elections ===
==== Governor of South Gyeongsang ====
Year	Elections	Constituency	Political party	Votes (%)	Remarks
2014	6th Iocal Election	South Gyeongsang (Governoral Elections)	NPAD	559,367 (36.05%)	Defeated (2nd)
2018	7th Iocal Election	South Gyeongsang (Governoral Elections)	Democratic	941,491 (52.81%)	Won
2026	9th Iocal Election	South Gyeongsang (Governoral Elections)	Democratic	852,377 (48.71%)	Defeated (2nd)
