= 2019 Justice Party (South Korea) leadership election =

Party leadership election in South Korea

2019 Justice Party leadership election
← 2017	8-13 July 2019	2021 →
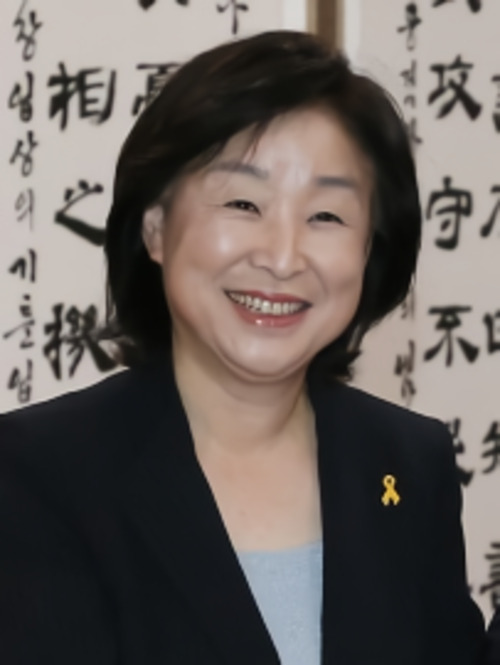
Candidate	Sim Sang-jung	Yang Kyung-gyu
Members' vote	16,177	3,178
Percentage	83.58%	16.42%
Leader before election
Lee Jeong-mi
Elected Leader
Sim Sang-jung

The Justice Party held a leadership election between 8 and 13 July 2019. It was an election to elect a new leader as Lee Jeong-mi fulfilled her two-year term of office.

== Candidates ==
=== Running ===
- Sim Sang-jung, member of the National Assembly for Goyang, former leader of the party (2015- 2017)
- Yang Kyung-gyu, former deputy secretary of the Korean Confederation of Trade Unions

== Campaigns ==
The leadership election has received media attention due to the presence of Sim Sang-jung, a presidential candidate in the 2017 South Korean presidential election and the former leader of the party, on the ballot. Yang, hailing from the party's left-wing faction, calls for a "bold, democratic socialist transformation" of the Korean society. The candidates have engaged in a series of debates that were broadcast on KBS and MBC.

== Results ==
Only dues-paying party members could vote in the election. The voting was held from 8 to 13 July 2019.

Final results
Candidate	Total votes
Sim Sang-jung	16,177 (83.58%)
Yang Kyung-gyu	3,178 (16.42%)
Total	19,355
