= 2018 opinion rigging scandal in South Korea =

Political scandal in South Korea

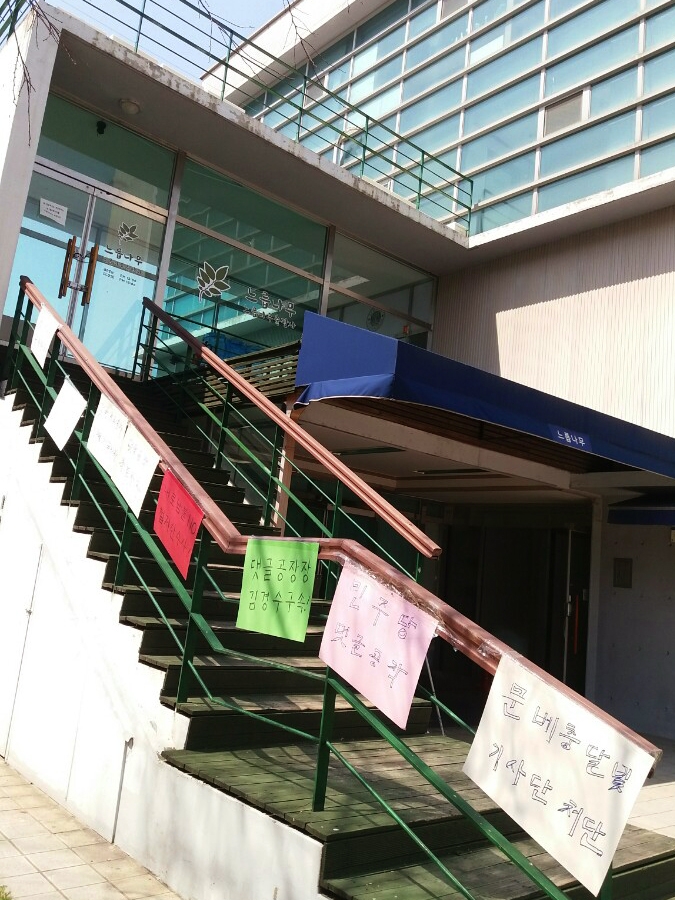
- The fake company's office where the perpetrators committed online opinion rigging
- Native name: 더불어민주당원 댓글 조작 사건
- English name: 2018 opinion rigging scandal in South Korea
- Duration: 2014 – 13 April 2018
- Location: Paju, South Korea; 37.712676°N 126.686071°E

The 2018 opinion rigging scandal in South Korea is a political scandal that began in April 2018 after a group of ardent supporters of the South Korean President Moon Jae-in had been charged with online opinion rigging. The accused suspects were the members of the ruling Democratic Party (DPK). The main perpetrator, as well as the leader of the pro-Moon group, was a well-known power-blogger called "Druking."

== Organized opinion rigging ==
Druking established a fake company known as the "Neureupnamu (Japanese elm) publishing company" in the city of Paju for organized opinion rigging. The accused used a macro program that can generate a barrage of online comments and likes in a few seconds in order to manipulate the public opinion in their favor.

== Controversy ==
The scandal led to a clash of political parties in South Korea. The Blue House and the ruling Democratic Party insisted that they are also a victim of the scandal. But the opposition parties emphasized that, since President Moon's involvement is suspected, this scandal is linked to the Moon administration's legitimacy. They called for a special prosecutor investigation for scrutiny.

== Special prosecutor investigation ==
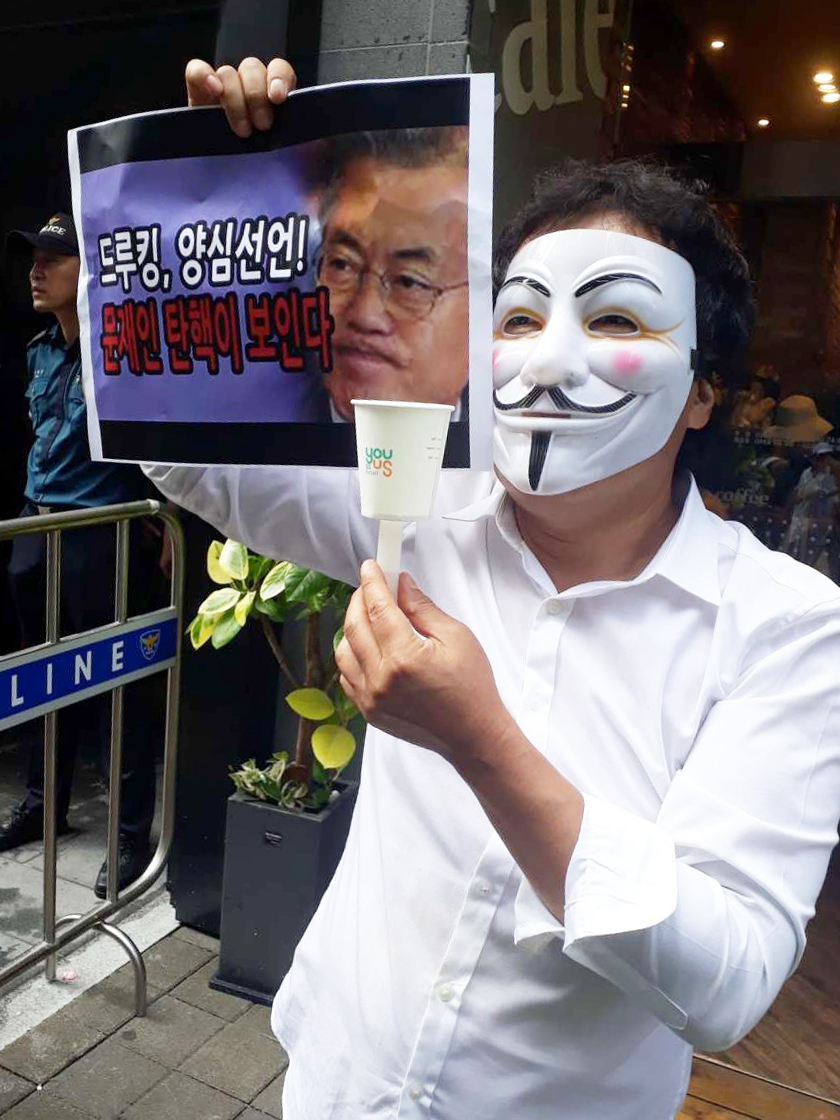
A protester wearing a Guy Fawkes mask criticizes Druking and calls for Moon Jae-in's impeachment at the front of the special prosecutor's office

On 21 May 2018, the National Assembly of South Korea passed a bill to appoint a special prosecutor to investigate the scandal.

On 8 June of the same year President Moon appointed former prosecutor and lawyer Huh Ik-beom as special prosecutor.

Justice Party lawmaker and long-time progressive activist Roh Hoe-chan committed suicide on 23 July during the investigation.

Kim Kyung-Soo, the governor of South Gyeongsang Province and a former lawmaker, was summoned by the Special Prosecutor, on 7 August.

The special prosecutor issued a warrant for the arrest of Kim; however, the request was rejected by the Seoul central district court. Prosecutor Huh announced the official end of investigation on 27 August without any extension. The prosecutor announced the conclusion that governor Kim, a lawmaker at that time, was an accomplice to the scandal, and will be under indictment without detention.

A The Minjoo Party spokesperson criticized the special prosecutor, claiming the investigation process depended only on Druking's testimony, without any proper evidence.

=== Decryption of encrypted files ===
In the special prosecutor's investigation of Druking in South Korea, the special prosecutor team tried to decrypt files encrypted by TrueCrypt and succeeded at decrypting some of them.

The special prosecutor said the hidden volumes were especially difficult to deal with. He decrypted some of encrypted files by inputting words that the Druking group had possibly used as passwords into passphrases. For instance, the Druking group liked words such as Zi wei dou shu (Purple Star Astrology) and KKM (acronym of 경제적 공진화 모임), so the special prosecutor's team tried to input these words as passphrases or parts of them.

After the special prosecutor team decrypted some of the encrypted files, Druking's associates changed their minds about the investigation.

In 2018, the special prosecutor indicted Gyeongnam Province Governor Kim Kyung-soo.

In 2019, he was jailed for two years on charges of online-rigging operations both in first and second instance. On 21 July 2021, he was sentenced to two years by the supreme court for computer business obstruction, and eventually lost his position as governor.
