= 2017 Justice Party (South Korea) leadership election =

2017 Justice Party leadership election
← 2015	6–11 July 2017	2019 →
Candidate	Lee Jeong-mi	Park Won-seok
Members' vote	7,172	5,624
Percentage	56.05%	43.95%
Leader before election
Sim Sang-jung
Elected Leader
Lee Jeong-mi

The Justice Party held a leadership election between 6 and 11 July 2017. It was an election to elect a new leader as Sim Sang-jung fulfilled her two-year term of office.

== Candidates ==
=== Running ===
- Lee Jeong-mi, member of the National Assembly.
- Park Won-seok, former member of the National Assembly.

== Results ==
The election was held only by the votes of the party members.

Final results
Candidate	On-line vote	Off-line vote	ARS vote	Total votes
Lee Jeong-mi	5,658 (55.7%)	69 (66.3%)	1,445 (57.2%)	7,172 (56.05%)
Park Won-seok	4,508 (44.3%)	35 (33.7%)	1,081 (42.8%)	5,624 (43.95%)
Total	10,166	104	2,526	12,796
