= 2019 South Korean by-elections =

The 2019 South Korean by-elections was held in South Korea on 3 April 2019. 2 seats to the National Assembly of South Korea were contested.

== Reasons for by-elections ==
The following Members of National Assembly lost or resigned from their seats:

- South Gyeongsang Changwon Seongsan District: Roh Hoe-chan (Justice), due to Roh's death.
- South Gyeongsang Tongyeong-Goseong District: Lee Gun-hyeon (Liberty Korea), due to Lee's violation of the Political Funds Act.

== Results ==
=== Seat control ===
Seat	Previous member	Party	Elected member	Party
Changwon Seongsan	Roh Hoe-chan	Justice	Yeo Yeong-gug	Justice
Tongyeong-Goseong	Lee Gun-hyeon	Liberty Korea	Jeong Jeom-sik	Liberty Korea

=== Changwon Seongsan ===
Candidate	Party	Votes	%	+/–
Yeo Yeong-gug	Justice Party	42,663	45.76	–3.75
Kang Gi-yun	Liberty Korea Party	42,159	45.22	+5.00
Son Seok-hyung	Minjung Party	3,540	3.80	New
Lee Jae-hwan	Bareunmirae Party	3,334	3.58	–4.71
Jin Soon-jung	Korean Patriots' Party	838	0.90	New
Kim Jong-seo	Independent	706	0.76	New
Total		93,240	100.00	–
Valid votes		93,240	99.07	
Invalid/blank votes		873	0.93	
Total votes		94,113	100.00	
Registered voters/turnout		183,934	51.17	–14.64
Justice Party hold				

=== Tongyeong-Goseong ===
Candidate	Party	Votes	%	+/–
Jeong Jeom-sik	Liberty Korea Party	47,082	59.48	–40.53
Yang Moon-seok	Democratic Party of Korea	28,490	35.99	+35.99
Park Chung-jung	Korean Patriots' Party	3,588	4.53	New
Total		79,160	100.00	–
Valid votes		79,160	99.31	
Invalid/blank votes		551	0.69	
Total votes		79,711	100.00	
Registered voters/turnout		155,741	51.18	
Liberty Korea Party hold				
