= Governor of South Gyeongsang Province =

Governor: Appointment (1946–1995), Election (1995-present)

- 경상남도지사
- Seal of South Gyeongsang

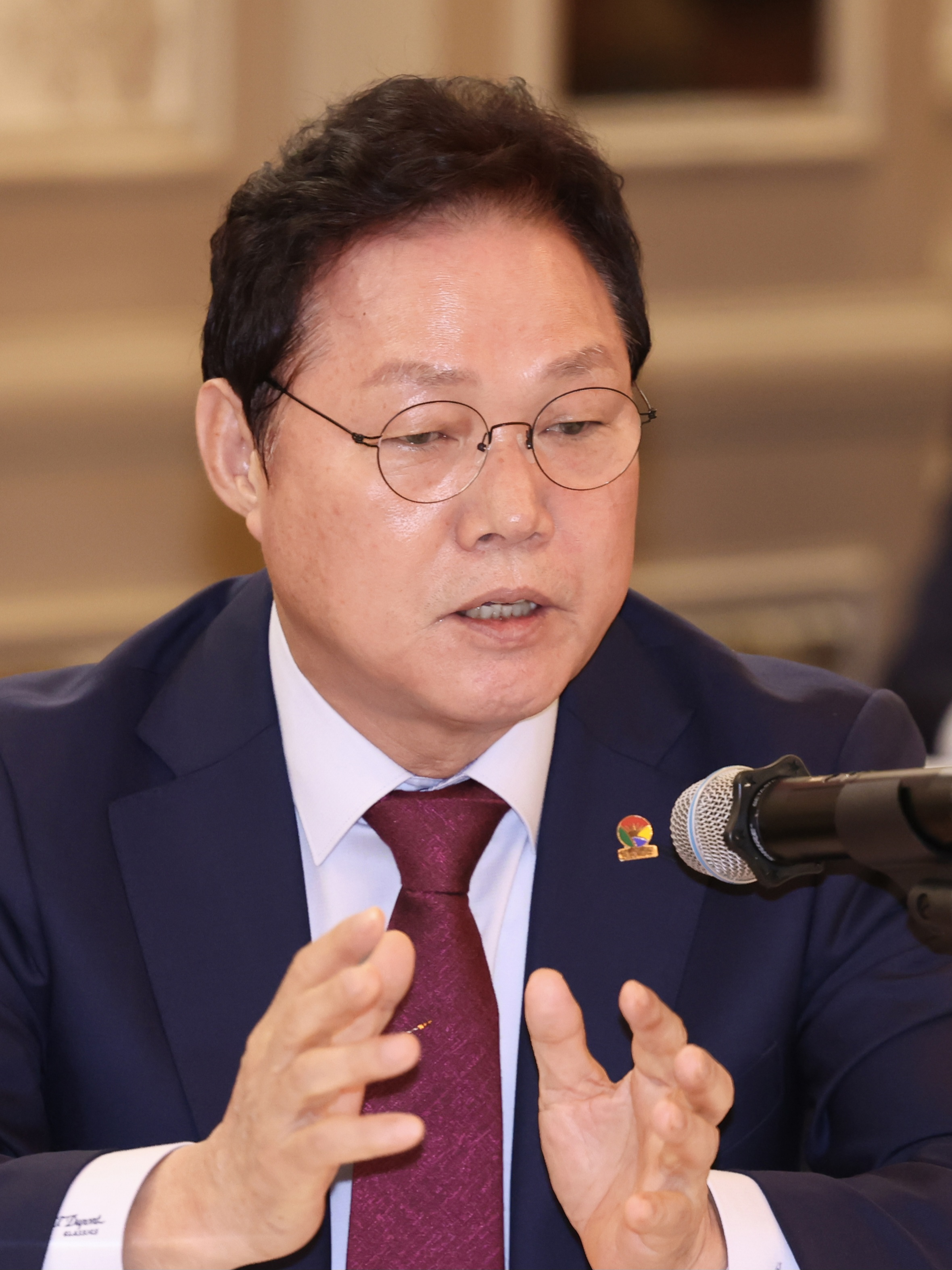
- Incumbent; Park Wan-su since 1 July 2022
- Term length: Four years
- Inaugural holder: Kim Byung-kyu
- Formation: 23 January 1946; 80 years ago
- Website: www.gyeongnam.go.kr/governor

The Governor of South Gyeongsang Province (Korean: 경상남도지사; Hanja: 慶尙南道知事) is the head of the local government of South Gyeongsang Province who is elected to a four-year term.

== List of governors ==
=== Appointed governors (before 1995) ===
From 1946 to 1995, the Governor of South Gyeongsang Province was appointed by the President of the Republic of Korea.

=== Directly elected governors (1995–present) ===
Since 1995, under provisions of the revised Local Government Act, the Governor of South Gyeongsang Province is elected by direct election.

Political parties
Conservative
Liberal
Independent
Status
Denotes acting governor

Term	Portrait	Name (Birth–Death)	Term of office			Political party	Elected
Term	Portrait	Name (Birth–Death)	Took office	Left office	Time in office	Political party	Elected
1st		Kim Hyuk-kyu 김혁규 金爀珪 (1939–2025)	1 July 1995	14 December 2003	8 years, 167 days	Democratic Liberal → New Korea → Grand National	1995
2nd		Kim Hyuk-kyu 김혁규 金爀珪 (1939–2025)	1 July 1995	14 December 2003	8 years, 167 days	Democratic Liberal → New Korea → Grand National	1998
3rd		Kim Hyuk-kyu 김혁규 金爀珪 (1939–2025)	1 July 1995	14 December 2003	8 years, 167 days	Democratic Liberal → New Korea → Grand National	2002
3rd		Chang In-tae 장인태 張仁太 (born 1951); Acting	15 December 2003	3 May 2004	141 days	Independent	—
3rd		Kim Chae-yong 김채용 金采溶 (born 1949); Acting	4 May 2004	5 June 2004	33 days	Independent	—
3rd		Kim Tae-ho 김태호 金台鎬 (born 1962)	6 June 2004	30 June 2010	6 years, 25 days	Grand National	2004 (by-el.)
4th		Kim Tae-ho 김태호 金台鎬 (born 1962)	6 June 2004	30 June 2010	6 years, 25 days	Grand National	2006
5th		Kim Doo-kwan 김두관 金斗官 (born 1959)	1 July 2010	6 July 2012	2 years, 6 days	Independent → Democratic United	2010
5th		Lim Chae-ho 임채호 林采虎 (born 1958); Acting	7 July 2012	19 December 2012	166 days	Independent	—
5th		Hong Joon-pyo 홍준표 洪準杓 (born 1954)	20 December 2012	9 April 2017	4 years, 111 days	Saenuri → Liberty Korea	2012 (by-el.)
6th		Hong Joon-pyo 홍준표 洪準杓 (born 1954)	20 December 2012	9 April 2017	4 years, 111 days	Saenuri → Liberty Korea	2014
6th		Ryu Soon-hyun 류순현 柳淳鉉 (born 1963); Acting	10 April 2017	16 August 2017	129 days	Independent	—
6th		Han Kyung-ho 한경호 韓徑浩 (born 1963); Acting	17 August 2017	30 June 2018	318 days	Independent	—
7th		Kim Kyoung-soo 김경수 金慶洙 (born 1967)	1 July 2018	21 July 2021	3 years, 21 days	Democratic	2018
7th		Ha Byung-pil 하병필 河炳弼 (born 1968); Acting	21 July 2021	30 June 2022	345 days	Independent	—
8th		Park Wan-su 박완수 朴完洙 (born 1955)	1 July 2022	Incumbent	4 years, 138 days	People Power	2022
9th		Park Wan-su 박완수 朴完洙 (born 1955)	1 July 2022	Incumbent	4 years, 138 days	People Power	2026

== Elections ==
=== 1995 ===
1995 South Gyeongsang gubernatorial election
Party	#	Candidate	Votes	Percentage
Democratic Liberal	1	Kim Hyuk-kyu	1,177,397	63.84%
United Liberal Democrats	2	Kim Yong-kyun	666,756	36.15%
Total			1,844,153	100.00%
Voter turnout			73.05%	

=== 1998 ===
1998 South Gyeongsang gubernatorial election
Party	#	Candidate	Votes	Percentage
Grand National	1	Kim Hyuk-kyu	939,358	74.64%
National Congress	2	Kang Shin-hwa	161,703	12.84%
Independent	4	Heo Moon-doh	157,337	12.50%
Total			1,258,398	100.00%
Voter turnout			61.08%	

=== 2002 ===
2002 South Gyeongsang gubernatorial election
Party	#	Candidate	Votes	Percentage
Grand National	1	Kim Hyuk-kyu	920,706	74.50%
Millennium Democratic	2	Kim Doo-kwan	208,641	16.88%
Democratic Labor	3	Lim Su-tae	106,367	8.60%
Total			1,235,714	100.00%
Voter turnout			56.53%	

=== 2004 (by-election) ===
2004 South Gyeongsang gubernatorial by-election
Party	#	Candidate	Votes	Percentage
Grand National	2	Kim Tae-ho	454,883	61.60%
Uri	1	Chang In-tae	203,272	27.53%
Democratic Labor	3	Lim Su-tae	80,290	10.87%
Total			738,445	100.00%
Voter turnout			32.80%	

=== 2006 ===
2006 South Gyeongsang gubernatorial election
Party	#	Candidate	Votes	Percentage
Grand National	2	Kim Tae-ho	852,377	63.12%
Uri	1	Kim Doo-kwan	343,137	25.41%
Democratic Labor	4	Moon Sung-hyun	135,823	10.05%
People First	5	Kim Jae-ju	18,906	1.40%
Total			1,350,243	100.00%
Voter turnout			57.84%	

=== 2010 ===
2010 South Gyeongsang gubernatorial election
Party	#	Candidate	Votes	Percentage
Independent	7	Kim Doo-kwan	812,336	53.50%
Grand National	1	Lee Dal-gon	705,986	46.49%
Total			1,518,322	100.00%
Voter turnout			61.83%	

=== 2012 (by-election) ===
2012 South Gyeongsang gubernatorial by-election
Party	#	Candidate	Votes	Percentage
Saenuri	1	Hong Joon-pyo	1,191,904	62.91%
Independent	4	Kwon Young-ghil	702,689	37.09%
Total			1,894,593	100.00%
Voter turnout			76.80%	

=== 2014 ===
2014 South Gyeongsang gubernatorial election
Party	#	Candidate	Votes	Percentage
Saenuri	1	Hong Joon-pyo	913,162	58.85%
NPAD	2	Kim Kyoung-soo	559,367	36.05%
Unified Progressive	3	Kang Byung-ki	79,015	5.09%
Total			1,551,544	100.00%
Voter turnout			59.80%	

=== 2018 ===
2018 South Gyeongsang gubernatorial election
Party	#	Candidate	Votes	Percentage
Democratic	1	Kim Kyoung-soo	941,491	52.81%
Liberty Korea	2	Kim Tae-ho	765,809	42.95%
Bareunmirae	3	Kim Yoo-geun	75,418	4.23%
Total			1,782,718	100.00%
Voter turnout			65.79%	

=== 2022 ===
2022 South Gyeongsang gubernatorial election
Party	#	Candidate	Votes	Percentage
People Power	2	Park Wan-su	963,473	65.70%
Democratic	1	Yang Moon-seok	431,569	29.43%
Justice	3	Yeo Yeong-gug	58,933	4.01%
United Korea	4	Choi Jin-seok	12,353	0.84%
Total			1,466,328	100.00%
Voter turnout			53.40%	

=== 2026 ===
Candidate	Party	Votes	%
Park Wan-su (incumbent)	People Power Party	897,975	51.29
Kim Kyoung-soo	Democratic Party	852,911	48.71
Total		1,750,886	100.00
Valid votes		1,750,886	97.62
Invalid/blank votes		42,631	2.38
Total votes		1,793,517	100.00
Registered voters/turnout		2,775,745	64.61
People Power hold			

== See also ==
- Government of South Korea
- Politics of South Korea
