= 2010 South Korean local elections =

- 2 June 2010

16 regional heads 761 regional councilors 228 municipal mayors 2,888 municipal councilors
- Registered: 38,851,159
- Turnout: 21,162,998; 54.5% (▲2.9pp)
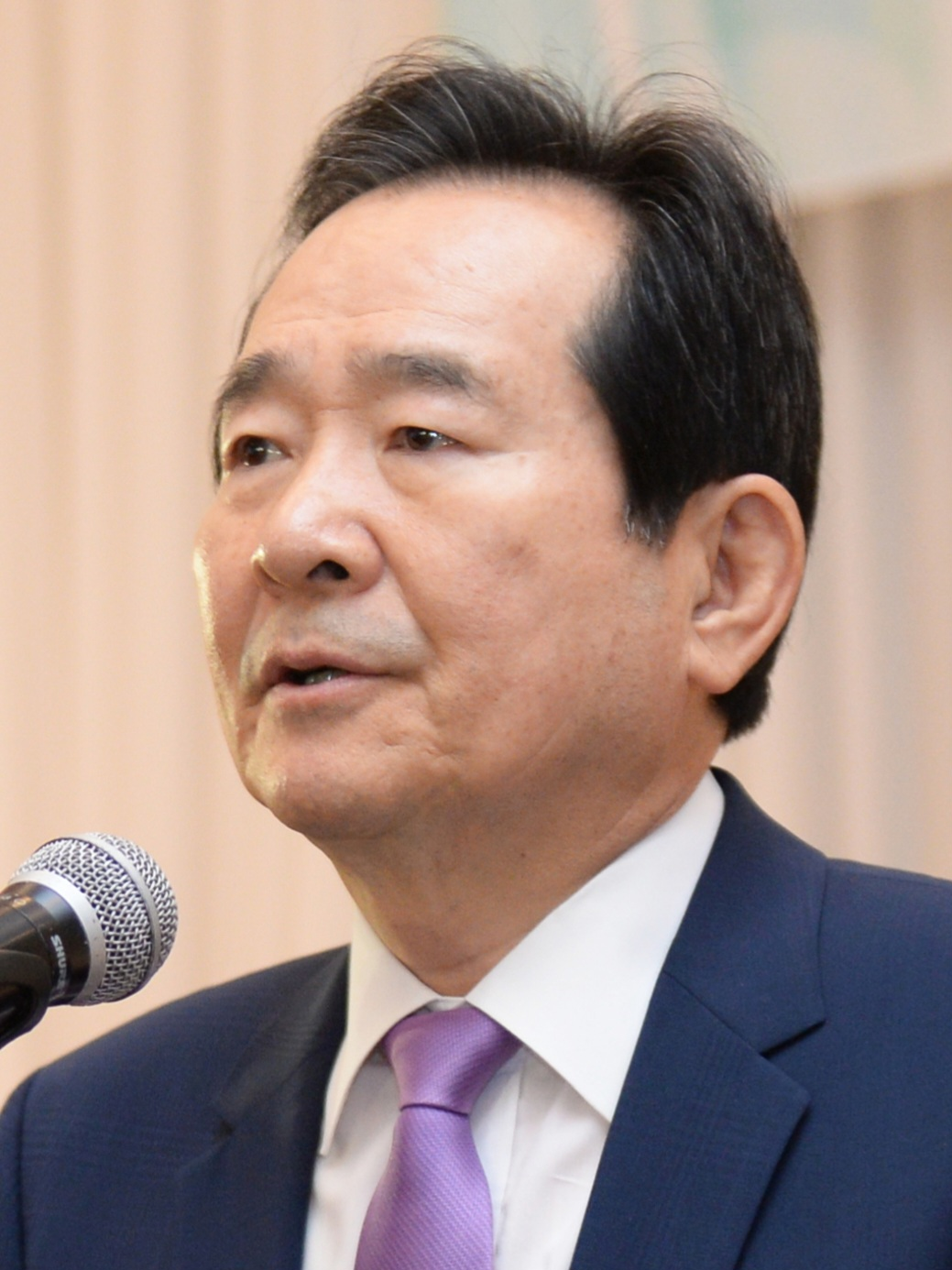

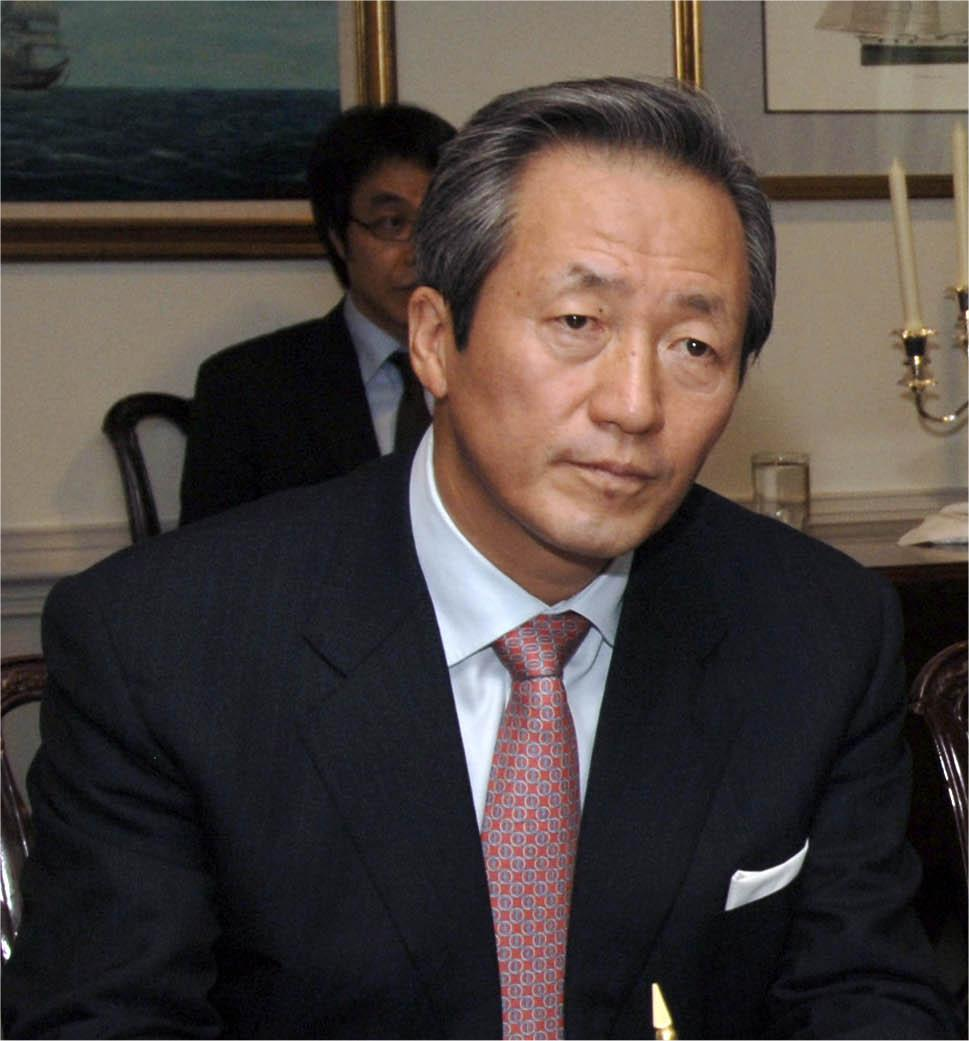

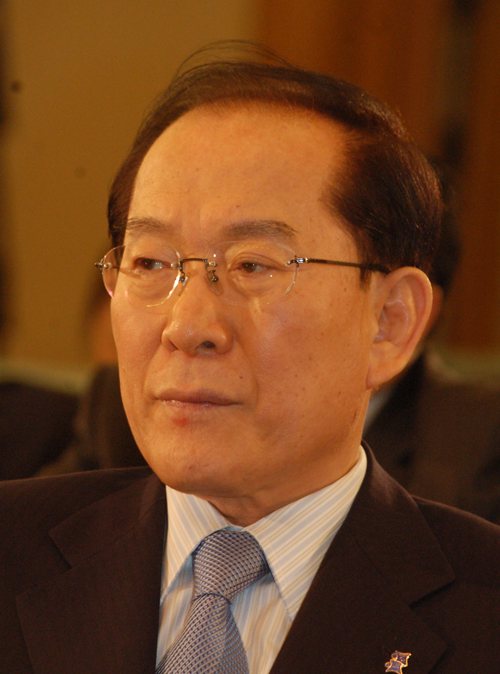
	First party	Second party	Third party
Leader	Chung Sye-kyun	Chung Mong-joon	Lee Hoi-chang
Party	Democratic	Grand National	Liberty Forward
Regional seats last election	3 heads 132 councilors	12 heads 557 councilors	Did not exist
Municipal seats last election	39 mayors 906 councilors	155 mayors 1,621 councilors	Did not exist
Regional seats won	7 heads 360 councilors	6 heads 288 councilors	1 head 41 councilors
Regional seat change	▲4 heads ▲228 councilors	▼6 heads ▼269 councilors	New
Municipal seats won	92 mayors 1,025 councilors	82 mayors 1,247 councilors	13 mayors 117 councilors
Municipal seat change	▲53 mayors ▲119 councilors	▼73 mayors ▼374 councilors	New

The 5th Local Elections were held in South Korea on 2 June 2010. It was the first local elections in South Korea to have political parties nominating candidates for municipal councilors.

The ruling Grand National Party was able to win four out of seven mayoral seats but suffer by massive landslide on the gubernatorial election winning only two out of nine seats. On the other hand, the Democratic Party was able to capture two mayoral seats and swept five out of nine gubernatorial seats. The Liberty Forward Party won Daejeon while two independent candidates won gubernatorial seats in South Gyeongsang Province and in Jeju Province.

Left top: Results of metropolitan mayoral and gubernatorial elections Right top: Results of municipal mayoral elections Left bottom: Results of provincial legislative elections Right top: Results of municipal legislative elections GNP DP LFP DLP CKP NPP PFU PPP FU PPU Ind. The 5th local elections were held in South Korea on 2 June 2010. The voter turnout reached 54.4%, the highest in 15 years.

== Voter turnout by province and city ==
Province/City	Electorate	Turnout	%
Seoul	8,211,461	4,421,491	53.8
Busan	2,849,895	1,410,809	49.5
Daegu	1,928,835	886,317	45.9
Incheon	2,096,853	1,068,735	50.9
Gwangju	1,064,913	530,688	49.8
Daejeon	1,127,547	595,718	52.9
Ulsan	838,805	462,339	55.1
Gyeonggi Province	8,761,840	4,538,591	51.8
Gangwon Province	1,190,509	742,105	62.3
North Chungcheong Province	1,183,811	695,977	58.8
South Chungcheong Province	1,595,587	902,299	56.5
North Jeolla Province	1,442,805	856,846	59.3
South Jeolla Province	1,504,902	967,573	64.3
North Gyeongsang Province	2,122,905	1,260,726	59.4
South Gyeongsang	2,506,393	1,550,538	61.8
Jeju	424,098	276,134	65.1
Total	38,851,159	21,166,886	54.5
Source：National Election Commission

== Regional head elections ==
Party	Votes	%	Seats	+/–
Grand National Party	9,441,701	45.72	6	–6
Democratic Party	6,314,535	30.58	7	+4
Participation Party	2,243,068	10.86	0	New
Liberty Forward Party	713,419	3.45	1	New
Democratic Labor Party	393,819	1.91	0	0
New Progressive Party	389,918	1.89	0	New
Party for Peace and Democracy	106,339	0.51	0	New
Party of Future Union	18,339	0.09	0	New
Independents	1,031,283	4.99	2	+1
Total	20,652,421	100.00	16	0
Valid votes	20,652,421	97.59		
Invalid/blank votes	510,577	2.41		
Total votes	21,162,998	100.00		
Registered voters/turnout	38,851,159	54.47		
Source: National Election Commission

=== Summary ===
Province/City	Head	Incumbent	Party	Elected	Party
Seoul	Mayor	Oh Se-hoon	Grand National	Oh Se-hoon	Grand National
Busan	Mayor	Hur Nam-sik	Grand National	Hur Nam-sik	Grand National
Daegu	Mayor	Kim Bum-il	Grand National	Kim Bum-il	Grand National
Incheon	Mayor	Ahn Sang-soo	Grand National	Song Young-gil	Democratic
Gwangju	Mayor	Park Gwang-tae	Democratic	Kang Woon-tae	Democratic
Daejeon	Mayor	Park Sung-hyo	Grand National	Yeom Hong-cheol	Liberty Forward
Ulsan	Mayor	Park Maeng-woo	Grand National	Park Maeng-woo	Grand National
Gyeonggi	Governor	Kim Moon-soo	Grand National	Kim Moon-soo	Grand National
Gangwon	Governor	Kim Jin-sun	Grand National	Lee Kwang-jae	Democratic
North Chungcheong	Governor	Chung Woo-taik	Grand National	Lee Si-jong	Democratic
South Chungcheong	Governor	Lee In-hwa (acting)	Independent	Ahn Hee-jung	Democratic
North Jeolla	Governor	Kim Wan-ju	Democratic	Kim Wan-ju	Democratic
South Jeolla	Governor	Park Jun-young	Democratic	Park Jun-young	Democratic
North Gyeongsang	Governor	Kim Kwan-yong	Grand National	Kim Kwan-yong	Grand National
South Gyeongsang	Governor	Kim Tae-ho	Grand National	Kim Doo-kwan	Independent
Jeju	Governor	Kim Tae-hwan	Independent	Woo Geun-min	Independent

=== Seoul ===
Candidate	Party	Votes	%
Oh Se-hoon (incumbent)	Grand National Party	2,086,127	47.44
Han Myung-sook	Democratic Party	2,059,715	46.84
Roh Hoe-chan	New Progressive Party	143,459	3.26
Ji Sang-wook	Liberty Forward Party	90,032	2.05
Seok Jong-hyun	Party of Future Union	18,339	0.42
Total		4,397,672	100.00
Valid votes		4,397,672	99.36
Invalid/blank votes		28,510	0.64
Total votes		4,426,182	100.00
Registered voters/turnout		8,211,461	53.90
Grand National hold			
Source: National Election Commission

=== Busan ===
Candidate	Party	Votes	%
Hur Nam-sik (incumbent)	Grand National Party	770,507	55.43
Kim Jeong-gil	Democratic Party	619,565	44.57
Total		1,390,072	100.00
Valid votes		1,390,072	98.58
Invalid/blank votes		20,054	1.42
Total votes		1,410,126	100.00
Registered voters/turnout		2,849,895	49.48
Grand National hold			
Source: National Election Commission

=== Daegu ===
Candidate	Party	Votes	%
Kim Bum-il (incumbent)	Grand National Party	633,118	72.93
Lee Seung-cheon	Democratic Party	146,458	16.87
Cho Myung-rae	New Progressive Party	88,599	10.21
Total		868,175	100.00
Valid votes		868,175	97.98
Invalid/blank votes		17,860	2.02
Total votes		886,035	100.00
Registered voters/turnout		1,928,835	45.94
Grand National hold			
Source: National Election Commission

=== Incheon ===
Candidate	Party	Votes	%
Song Young-gil	Democratic Party	556,902	52.70
Ahn Sang-soo (incumbent)	Grand National Party	469,040	44.38
Kim Sang-ha	New Progressive Party	19,580	1.85
Paik Seok-doo	Party for Peace and Democracy	11,258	1.07
Total		1,056,780	100.00
Valid votes		1,056,780	99.00
Invalid/blank votes		10,651	1.00
Total votes		1,067,431	100.00
Registered voters/turnout		2,096,853	50.91
Democratic gain from Grand National			
Source: National Election Commission

=== Gwangju ===
Candidate	Party	Votes	%
Kang Woon-tae	Democratic Party	297,003	56.74
Chung Chan-yong	Participation Party	75,830	14.49
Chung Yong-hwa	Grand National Party	74,490	14.23
Chang Won-seop	Democratic Labor Party	39,455	7.54
Yoon Nan-sil	New Progressive Party	30,834	5.89
Cho Hong-kyu	Party for Peace and Democracy	5,871	1.12
Total		523,483	100.00
Valid votes		523,483	98.79
Invalid/blank votes		6,418	1.21
Total votes		529,901	100.00
Registered voters/turnout		1,064,913	49.76
Democratic hold			
Source: National Election Commission

=== Daejeon ===
Candidate	Party	Votes	%
Yeom Hong-cheol	Liberty Forward Party	276,122	46.68
Park Sung-hyo (incumbent)	Grand National Party	168,616	28.50
Kim Won-woong	Democratic Party	137,751	23.29
Kim Yoon-ki	New Progressive Party	9,074	1.53
Total		591,563	100.00
Valid votes		591,563	99.14
Invalid/blank votes		5,120	0.86
Total votes		596,683	100.00
Registered voters/turnout		1,127,547	52.92
Liberty Forward gain from Grand National			
Source: National Election Commission

=== Ulsan ===
Candidate	Party	Votes	%
Park Maeng-woo (incumbent)	Grand National Party	279,421	61.26
Kim Chang-hyun	Democratic Labor Party	133,437	29.26
Noh Ok-hee	New Progressive Party	43,256	9.48
Total		456,114	100.00
Valid votes		456,114	98.70
Invalid/blank votes		5,989	1.30
Total votes		462,103	100.00
Registered voters/turnout		838,805	55.09
Grand National hold			
Source: National Election Commission

=== Gyeonggi ===
Candidate	Party	Votes	%
Kim Moon-soo (incumbent)	Grand National Party	2,271,492	52.20
Rhyu Si-min	Participation Party	2,079,892	47.80
Total		4,351,384	100.00
Valid votes		4,351,384	95.96
Invalid/blank votes		183,387	4.04
Total votes		4,534,771	100.00
Registered voters/turnout		8,761,840	51.76
Grand National hold			
Source: National Election Commission

=== Gangwon ===
Candidate	Party	Votes	%
Lee Kwang-jae	Democratic Party	388,443	54.36
Lee Chang-bok	Grand National Party	326,111	45.64
Total		714,554	100.00
Valid votes		714,554	96.34
Invalid/blank votes		27,170	3.66
Total votes		741,724	100.00
Registered voters/turnout		1,190,509	62.30
Democratic gain from Grand National			
Source: National Election Commission

=== North Chungcheong ===
Candidate	Party	Votes	%
Lee Si-jong	Democratic Party	349,913	51.22
Chung Woo-taik (incumbent)	Grand National Party	313,646	45.91
Kim Baek-kyu	New Progressive Party	19,551	2.86
Total		683,110	100.00
Valid votes		683,110	98.09
Invalid/blank votes		13,283	1.91
Total votes		696,393	100.00
Registered voters/turnout		1,183,811	58.83
Democratic gain from Grand National			
Source: National Election Commission

=== South Chungcheong ===
Candidate	Party	Votes	%
Ahn Hee-jung	Democratic Party	367,288	42.25
Park Sang-don	Liberty Forward Party	347,265	39.95
Park Hae-chun	Grand National Party	154,723	17.80
Total		869,276	100.00
Valid votes		869,276	96.39
Invalid/blank votes		32,587	3.61
Total votes		901,863	100.00
Registered voters/turnout		1,595,587	56.52
Democratic gain			
Source: National Election Commission

=== North Jeolla ===
Candidate	Party	Votes	%
Kim Wan-ju (incumbent)	Democratic Party	569,980	68.68
Jeong Woon-chun	Grand National Party	151,064	18.20
Ha Yeon-ho	Democratic Labor Party	52,331	6.31
Yeom Kyung-suk	New Progressive Party	35,565	4.29
Kim Dae-sik	Party for Peace and Democracy	20,990	2.53
Total		829,930	100.00
Valid votes		829,930	96.94
Invalid/blank votes		26,181	3.06
Total votes		856,111	100.00
Registered voters/turnout		1,442,805	59.34
Democratic hold			
Source: National Election Commission

=== South Jeolla ===
Candidate	Party	Votes	%
Park Jun-young (incumbent)	Democratic Party	629,984	68.30
Kim Dae-sik	Grand National Party	123,548	13.40
Park Woong-doo	Democratic Labor Party	100,581	10.91
Kim Kyung-jae	Party for Peace and Democracy	68,220	7.40
Total		922,333	100.00
Valid votes		922,333	95.35
Invalid/blank votes		45,005	4.65
Total votes		967,338	100.00
Registered voters/turnout		1,504,902	64.28
Democratic hold			
Source: National Election Commission

=== North Gyeongsang ===
Candidate	Party	Votes	%
Kim Kwan-yong (incumbent)	Grand National Party	913,812	75.36
Hong Eui-rak	Democratic Party	143,347	11.82
Yoo Sung-chan	Participation Party	87,346	7.20
Yoon Byung-tae	Democratic Labor Party	68,015	5.61
Total		1,212,520	100.00
Valid votes		1,212,520	96.19
Invalid/blank votes		48,071	3.81
Total votes		1,260,591	100.00
Registered voters/turnout		2,122,905	59.38
Grand National hold			
Source: National Election Commission

=== South Gyeongsang ===
Candidate	Party	Votes	%
Kim Doo-kwan	Independent	812,336	53.50
Lee Dal-gon	Grand National Party	705,986	46.50
Total		1,518,322	100.00
Valid votes		1,518,322	97.98
Invalid/blank votes		31,368	2.02
Total votes		1,549,690	100.00
Registered voters/turnout		2,506,393	61.83
Independent gain from Grand National			
Source: National Election Commission

=== Jeju ===
Candidate	Party	Votes	%
Woo Geun-min	Independent	110,603	41.40
Hyun Myung-gwan	Independent	108,344	40.56
Goh Hee-bum	Democratic Party	48,186	18.04
Total		267,133	100.00
Valid votes		267,133	96.77
Invalid/blank votes		8,923	3.23
Total votes		276,056	100.00
Registered voters/turnout		424,098	65.09
Independent gain from Independent			
Source: National Election Commission

== Regional council elections ==
Party	Proportional			Constituency			Total seats	+/–
Party	Votes	%	Seats	Votes	%	Seats	Total seats	+/–
Grand National Party	8,229,971	39.83	36	7,755,547	39.72	252	288	–269
Democratic Party	7,252,190	35.10	32	6,849,717	35.08	328	360	+228
Democratic Labor Party	1,519,364	7.35	6	653,715	3.35	18	24	+9
Participation Party	1,374,951	6.65	2	364,093	1.86	3	5	New
Liberty Forward Party	936,957	4.53	3	681,024	3.49	38	41	New
New Progressive Party	647,346	3.13	0	185,380	0.95	3	3	New
Pro-Park Alliance	379,737	1.84	2	123,379	0.63	1	3	New
Party of Future Union	159,503	0.77	0	183,385	0.94	1	1	New
Party for Peace and Democracy	83,092	0.40	0	27,904	0.14	0	0	New
Socialist Party	81,257	0.39	0				0	0
People's First Union				36,857	0.19	0	0	New
Creative Korea Party				21,391	0.11	0	0	New
International Green Party				443	0.00	0	0	New
National Foundation Party				240	0.00	0	0	New
Independents				2,644,102	13.54	36	36	+22
Total	20,664,368	100.00	81	19,527,177	100.00	680	761	+28
Valid votes	20,664,368	97.63		19,527,177	97.27			
Invalid/blank votes	500,832	2.37		548,125	2.73			
Total votes	21,165,200	100.00		20,075,302	100.00			
Registered voters/turnout	38,851,159	54.48		36,812,169	54.53			
Source: National Election Commission

=== Results by province or city ===
Province/City	Seats	DP	GNP	LFP	DLP	PPP	NPP	PPA	FU	IND
Seoul	106	79	27							
Busan	47	2	40							5
Daegu	29		27					1		1
Incheon	33	23	6		1	1				2
Gwangju	22	20			2					
Daejeon	22	5	1	16						
Ulsan	22		13		7					2
Gyeonggi	124	76	42		1	2	1			2
Gangwon	42	14	22							6
North Chungcheong	31	22	4	4	1					
South Chungcheong	40	13	6	21						
North Jeolla	38	35	1		2					
South Jeolla	57	49	1		3					4
North Gyeongsang	58	1	48					2	1	6
South Gyeongsang	54	3	38		5	1	2			5
Jeju	36	18	12		2	1				3
Total	761	360	288	41	24	5	3	3	1	36
Source: National Election Commission

=== Constituency seats ===
Province/City	Seats	DP	GNP	LFP	DLP	PPP	NPP	PPA	FU	IND
Seoul	96	74	22							
Busan	42		37							5
Daegu	26		25							1
Incheon	30	21	5		1	1				2
Gwangju	19	18			1					
Daejeon	19	4		15						
Ulsan	19		11		6					2
Gyeonggi	112	71	36		1	1	1			2
Gangwon	38	12	20							6
North Chungcheong	28	20	3	4	1					
South Chungcheong	36	12	5	19						
North Jeolla	34	33			1					
South Jeolla	51	45			2					4
North Gyeongsang	52		44					1	1	6
South Gyeongsang	49	2	35		4	1	2			5
Jeju	29	16	9		1					3
Total	680	328	252	38	18	3	3	1	1	36
Source: National Election Commission

=== Proportional representation seats ===
Province/City	Seats	GNP	DP	DLP	LFP	PPP	PPA
Seoul	10	5	5				
Busan	5	3	2				
Daegu	3	2					1
Incheon	3	1	2				
Gwangju	3		2	1			
Daejeon	3	1	1		1		
Ulsan	3	2		1			
Gyeonggi	12	6	5			1	
Gangwon	4	2	2				
North Chungcheong	3	1	2				
South Chungcheong	4	1	1		2		
North Jeolla	4	1	2	1			
South Jeolla	6	1	4	1			
North Gyeongsang	6	4	1				1
South Gyeongsang	5	3	1	1			
Jeju	7	3	2	1		1	
Total	81	36	32	6	3	2	2
Source: National Election Commission

GNP Winning Margins on PR seats for provincial legislative elections

DEP Winning Margins on PR seats for provincial legislative elections

LFP Winning Margins on PR seats for provincial legislative elections

DLP Winning Margins on PR seats for provincial legislative elections

NPP Winning Margins on PR seats for provincial legislative elections

PPP Winning Margins on PR seats for provincial legislative elections

== Municipal mayoral elections ==
Municipal Mayoral elections map by party ■ GNP ■ DEP ■ LFP ■ DLP ■ PFU ■ FU ■ Ind.

Party	Votes	%	Seats	+/–
Grand National Party	7,774,122	38.64	82	–73
Democratic Party	7,093,848	35.26	92	+53
Liberty Forward Party	638,485	3.17	13	New
Democratic Labor Party	627,877	3.12	3	+3
Participation Party	293,261	1.46	0	New
Party of Future Union	145,061	0.72	1	New
Pro-Park Alliance	112,232	0.56	0	New
New Progressive Party	66,347	0.33	0	New
People's First Union	40,255	0.20	1	New
Party for Peace and Democracy	30,144	0.15	0	New
Creative Korea Party	23,125	0.11	0	New
Liberty Peace Party	817	0.00	0	0
International Green Party	282	0.00	0	New
Independents	3,274,479	16.27	36	+7
Total	20,120,335	100.00	228	–2
Valid votes	20,120,335	97.69		
Invalid/blank votes	475,963	2.31		
Total votes	20,596,298	100.00		
Registered voters/turnout	37,893,509	54.35		
Source: National Election Commission

=== Results by province or city ===
Province/City	Mayors	DP	GNP	LFP	DLP	PFU	FU	IND
Seoul	25	21	4					
Busan	16		13					3
Daegu	8		6					2
Incheon	10	6	1		2			1
Gwangju	5	4						1
Daejeon	5	1	1	3				
Ulsan	5		3		1			1
Gyeonggi	31	19	10					2
Gangwon	18	4	10					4
North Chungcheong	12	5	3	3				1
South Chungcheong	16	3	4	7		1		1
North Jeolla	14	13						1
South Jeolla	22	15						7
North Gyeongsang	23		16				1	6
South Gyeongsang	18	1	11					6
Total	228	92	82	13	3	1	1	36
Source: National Election Commission

== Municipal council elections ==
Party	Proportional			Constituency			Total seats	+/–
Party	Votes	%	Seats	Votes	%	Seats	Total seats	+/–
Grand National Party	7,677,554	41.04	160	8,208,166	40.75	1,087	1,247	–374
Democratic Party	7,299,086	39.02	154	6,354,603	31.55	871	1,025	+119
Democratic Labor Party	1,495,950	8.00	25	909,589	4.52	90	115	+49
Liberty Forward Party	807,837	4.32	22	604,461	3.00	95	117	New
Participation Party	774,450	4.14	7	389,477	1.93	17	24	New
Pro-Park Alliance	304,770	1.63	7	122,626	0.61	12	19	New
New Progressive Party	213,997	1.14	0	310,571	1.54	22	22	New
Party of Future Union	90,975	0.49	1	151,855	0.75	10	11	New
Party for Peace and Democracy	29,885	0.16	0	19,044	0.09	0	0	New
People's First Union	8,375	0.04	0	38,869	0.19	2	2	New
Creative Korea Party	3,725	0.02	0	13,798	0.07	1	1	New
Socialist Party				5,265	0.03	0	0	0
Independents				3,013,869	14.96	305	305	+77
Total	18,706,604	100.00	376	20,142,193	100.00	2,512	2,888	0
Valid votes	18,706,604	97.36		20,142,193	96.87			
Invalid/blank votes	507,984	2.64		651,376	3.13			
Total votes	19,214,588	100.00		20,793,569	100.00			
Registered voters/turnout	35,829,240	53.63		38,228,831	54.39			
Source: National Election Commission

=== Results by province or city ===
Province/City	Seats	GNP	DP	LFP	DLP	PPP	NPP	PPA	FU	PFU	CKP	IND
Seoul	419	208	201		3	2	4					1
Busan	182	109	36		9	2	3	2	1			20
Daegu	116	80	4		2	1	2	9	3			15
Incheon	112	53	50		5		2					2
Gwangju	68		49		14	2						3
Daejeon	63	11	25	27								
Ulsan	50	28			17	1	2					2
Gyeonggi	417	202	188		9	7	2		1		1	7
Gangwon	169	104	45									20
North Chungcheong	131	48	55	15	2							11
South Chungcheong	178	54	41	75						2		6
North Jeolla	197	2	137		6	5	1					46
South Jeolla	243		172		20	2						49
North Gyeongsang	284	190	5		3	1	2	8	3			72
South Gyeongsang	259	158	17		25	1	4		3			51
Total	2,888	1,247	1,025	117	115	24	22	19	11	2	1	305
Source: National Election Commission

=== Constituency seats ===
Province/City	Seats	GNP	DP	LFP	DLP	NPP	PPP	PPA	FU	PFU	CKP	IND
Seoul	366	183	173		3	4	2					1
Busan	158	93	28		9	3	2	2	1			20
Daegu	102	70	4		2	2	1	5	3			15
Incheon	97	46	43		4	2						2
Gwangju	59		44		10		2					3
Daejeon	55	11	21	23								
Ulsan	43	25			13	2	1					2
Gyeonggi	363	177	165		8	2	2		1		1	7
Gangwon	146	90	36									20
North Chungcheong	114	44	45	12	2							11
South Chungcheong	152	50	34	60						2		6
North Jeolla	173		119		3	1	4					46
South Jeolla	211		146		14		2					49
North Gyeongsang	247	162	1		2	2	1	5	2			72
South Gyeongsang	226	136	12		20	4			3			51
Total	2,512	1,087	871	95	90	22	17	12	10	2	1	305
Source: National Election Commission

=== Proportional representation seats ===
Province/City	Seats	GNP	DP	DLP	LFP	PPP	PPA	FU
Seoul	53	25	28					
Busan	24	16	8					
Daegu	14	10					4	
Incheon	15	7	7	1				
Gwangju	9		5	4				
Daejeon	8		4		4			
Ulsan	7	3		4				
Gyeonggi	54	25	23	1		5		
Gangwon	23	14	9					
North Chungcheong	17	4	10		3			
South Chungcheong	26	4	7		15			
North Jeolla	24	2	18	3		1		
South Jeolla	32		26	6				
North Gyeongsang	37	28	4	1			3	1
South Gyeongsang	33	22	5	5		1		
Total	376	160	154	25	22	7	7	1
Source: National Election Commission
