= Kim Tae-ho (politician) =

South Korean politician (born 1962)

Kim Tae-ho MP
- 김태호
- Kim in 2021

Member of the National Assembly
- Incumbent
- Assumed office 30 May 2024
- Preceded by: Kim Doo-kwan
- Constituency: Yangsan B (South Gyeongsang)
- In office 30 May 2020 – 29 May 2024
- Preceded by: Kang Seok-jin
- Succeeded by: Shin Sung-bum
- Constituency: Sancheong–Hamyang–Geochang–Hapcheon (South Gyeongsang)
- In office 27 April 2011 – 29 May 2016
- Preceded by: Choi Chul-guk
- Succeeded by: Kim Kyoung-soo
- Constituency: Gimhae B (South Gyeongsang)

Governor of South Gyeongsang Province
- In office 6 June 2004 – 30 June 2010
- Preceded by: Kim Hyeok-kyu; Chang In-tae (acting); Kim Chae-yong (acting)
- Succeeded by: Kim Doo-kwan

Personal details
- Born: 21 August 1962 (age 64) Geochang South Gyeongsang, South Korea
- Party: People Power

- Kim Tae-ho
- Hangul: 김태호
- Hanja: 金台鎬
- RR: Gim Taeho
- MR: Kim T'aeho

Kim Tae-ho (Korean: 김태호; born 21 August 1962) is a South Korean politician who served as the governor of South Gyeongsang Province from 2004 to 2010. He is currently a member of the National Assembly, serving his 4th term representing the Yangsan B constituency since 2024.

== Early life and career ==
Kim was born in a farming family in Geochang, South Gyeongsang Province. He acquired his master's from Seoul National University in 1987 and his doctorate in education from the same university in 1992. In the late 1990s, he joined the predecessor of the ruling Grand National Party and was elected to the council of South Gyeongsang Province in 1998.

== Governor ==
In 2004, he was elected as the Governor of South Gyeongsang Province and in the local political community, he has long been mentioned as one of the strongest next-generation leaders. He was narrowly re-elected in 2006. His term expired in June 2010.

== Prime minister nominee ==
President Lee Myung-bak nominated 47-year-old Kim as the new prime minister. His nomination is subject to the National Assembly's confirmation hearing and requires its approval. Gukhoe announced that Confirmation hearings on Kim's nomination will begin on Tuesday, 24 August. He has been the most controversial candidate in the confirmation hearing of all due to his background and previous accusations made again him, also admitted to ethical misconduct, including hiring a subordinate as his personal maid when serving as governor of South Gyeongsang Province and allowing his wife to use the car provided for official use. Assembly postponed confirmation vote on PM-designate because of his ethical qualifications. On 29 August, he offered to resign before confirmation vote.

== National Assembly Seat ==
On 27 Apr 2011, Kim won the April by elections for a National Assembly Seat representing Gimhae on the ruling party ticket by a narrow margin.

== Election results ==
=== General elections ===
Year	Elections	Constituency	Political party	Votes (%)	Results
2011	2011 By-election	Gimhae B (South Gyeongsang)	GNP	44,501 (51.01%)	Won
2012	19th National Assembly General Election	Gimhae B (South Gyeongsang)	Saenuri	63,290 (52.11%)	Won
2020	21st National Assembly General Election	Sancheong–Hamyang–Geochang–Hapcheon (South Gyeongsang)	Independent	49,123 (42.59%)	Won
2024	22nd National Assembly General Election	Yangsan B (South Gyeongsang)	PPP	50,685 (51.05%)	Won

=== Local elections ===
==== Governor of South Gyeongsang ====
Year	Elections	Constituency	Political party	Votes (%)	Remarks
2004	2004 By-election	South Gyeongsang (Governoral Elections)	GNP	454,883 (61.60%)	Won
2006	4th Iocal Election	South Gyeongsang (Governoral Elections)	GNP	852,377 (63.12%)	Won
2018	7th Iocal Election	South Gyeongsang (Governoral Elections)	LKP	765,809 (42.95%)	Defeated (2nd)

==== Mayor of South Gyeongsang Geochang ====
Year	Elections	Constituency	Political party	Votes (%)	Remarks
2002	3rd Iocal Election	Mayor of South Gyeongsang Geochang	GNP	20,782 (57.14%)	Won

==== South Gyeongsang Province Council ====
Year	Elections	Constituency	Political party	Votes (%)	Remarks
1998	2nd Iocal Election	South Gyeongsang Geochang 2nd	GNP	8,277 (55.74%)	Won

National Assembly of the Republic of Korea
Preceded by Choi Chul-kook	Member of the Assembly for Gimhae B (South Gyeongsang); 28 April 2011–29 May 2016	Succeeded by Kim Kyoung-soo
Preceded by Kang Seok-jin	Member of the Assembly for Sancheong–Hamyang–Geochang–Hapcheon (South Gyeongsang); 30 May 2020–29 May 2024	Succeeded by Shin Sung-bum
Preceded by Kim Doo-kwan	Member of the Assembly for Yangsan B (South Gyeongsang); 30 May 2024–	Incumbent
Political offices
Preceded by Chung Joo-hwan	Mayor of South Gyeongsang Geochang; 1 July 2002–19 May 2004	Succeeded by Kim Yoon-soo (Acting); Kang Seok-jin
Preceded by Kim Hyuk-kyu; Chang In-tae (Acting); Kim Chae-yong (Acting)	Governor of South Gyeongsang Province; 6 June 2004–30 June 2010	Succeeded by Kim Doo-kwan
