= Roh Hoe-chan =

South Korean politician (1956–2018)

- 노회찬
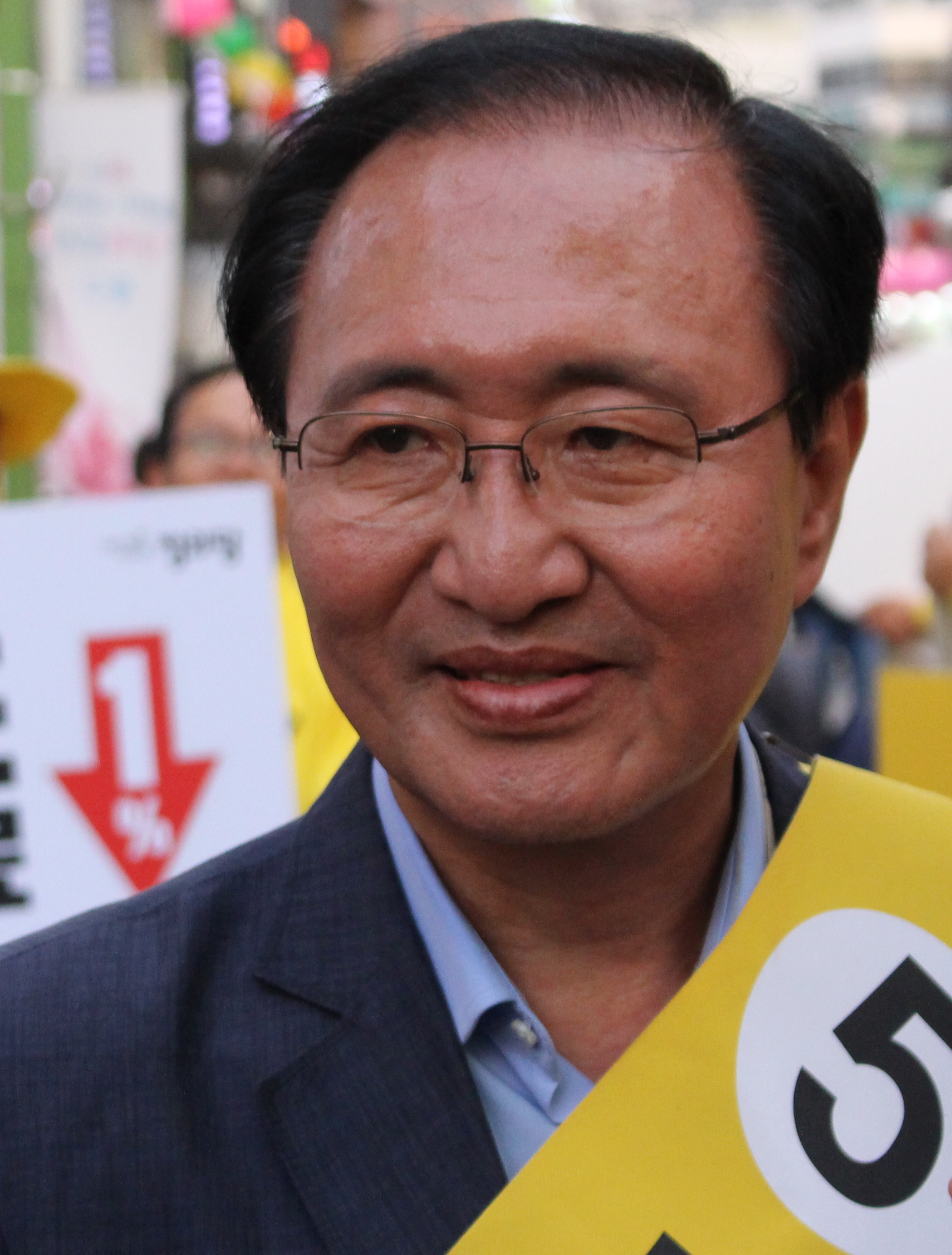
- Roh Hoe-chan in 2017

Member of the National Assembly
- In office 30 May 2016 – 23 July 2018
- Preceded by: Kang Gi-yun
- Succeeded by: Yeo Yeong-gug
- Constituency: Seongsan, Changwon (South Gyeongsang)
- In office 30 May 2012 – 14 February 2013
- Preceded by: Hong Jung-wook
- Succeeded by: Ahn Cheol-soo
- Constituency: Nowon C (Seoul)
- In office 30 May 2004 – 5 February 2008
- Constituency: Proportional representation

Personal details
- Born: 31 August 1956 Busan, South Korea
- Died: 23 July 2018 (aged 61) Seoul, South Korea
- Party: Justice Party (2012–18)
- Other political affiliations: Popular Party (1992); New Reform Party (1995); Democratic Party (1995–1997); Progressive Political Alliance (1997); Construction National Victory 21 (1997-1999); Democratic Labor Party (2000–08); New Progressive Party (2008–11); Unified Progressive Party (2011–12)
- Spouse: Kim Ji-sun
- Education: Korea University (B.A.)
- Website: http://omychans.tistory.com/

Korean name
- Hangul: 노회찬
- Hanja: 魯會燦
- RR: No Hoechan
- MR: No Hoech'an

Roh Hoe-chan (Korean: 노회찬, 31 August 1956 – 23 July 2018) was a South Korean politician. He was a member of the 17th, 19th, and 20th National Assemblies. Roh was involved with multiple progressive-leaning parties, lately with the Justice Party from 2012 until his death in 2018.

== Early life ==
Roh was born on 31 August 1956 in Busan into a middle-class household. He attended the prestigious Kyunggi High School in the 1970s. Afterwards, Roh went to college, taking part in political movements, and in 1982 was hired as a welder at a factory where he organized the factory workers. Roh was instrumental in the formation of the Incheon Democratic Workers' Federation (인천민주노동자연맹) with the aim of creating the workers' party. He was jailed for 30 months after being caught by the government in 1989, accused of breaking the National Security Act.

== Political career ==
After serving his jail term, Roh was involved with the formation of progressive political parties in the 1990s, which later became the Democratic Labor Party in 2000.

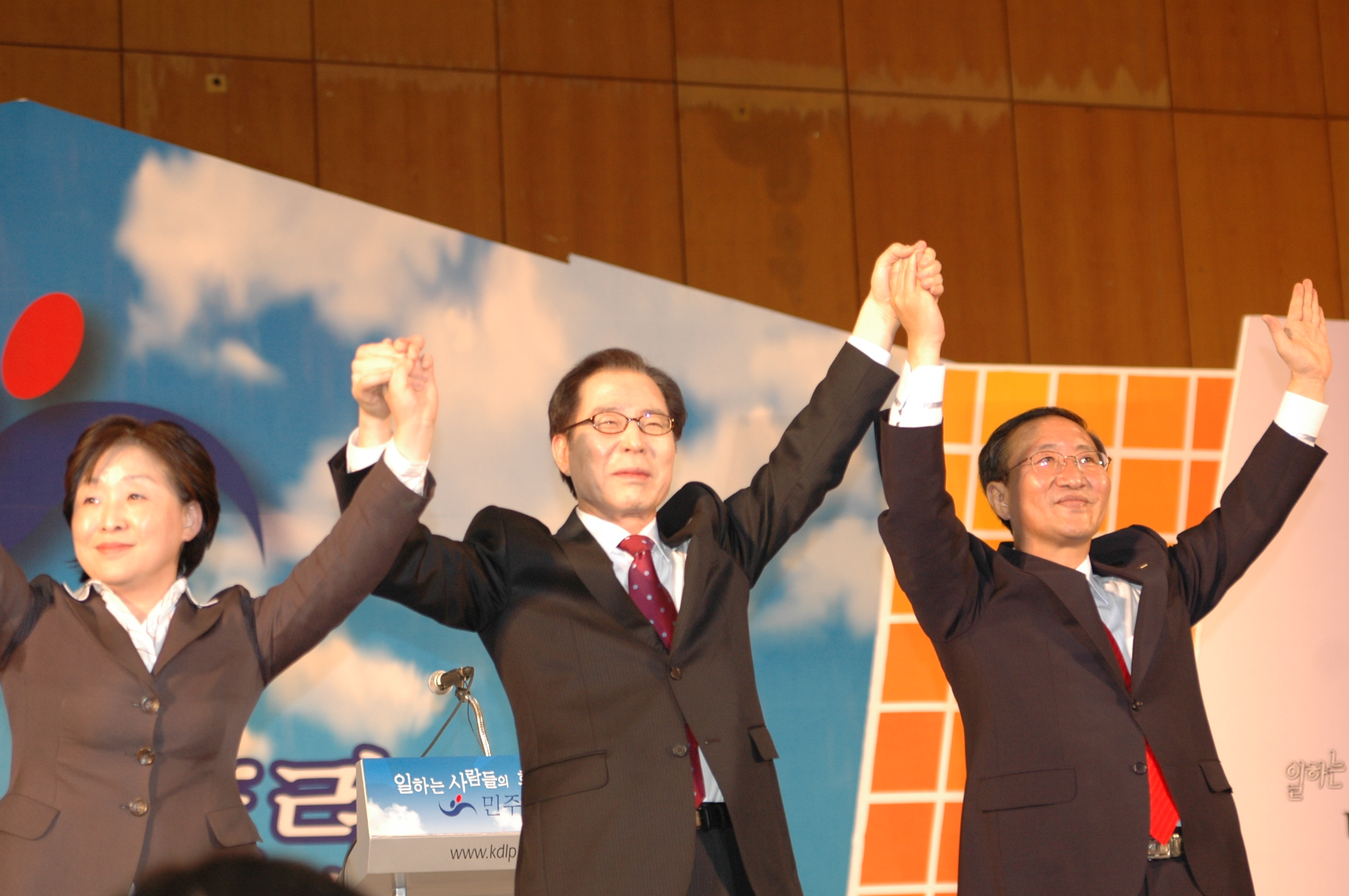
Roh Hoe-chan with Kwon Young-ghil and Sim Sang-jung on his bid for the presidential nomination of the Democratic Labor Party in 2007

He served as a member of the National Assembly from 2004 to 2008. He co-founded the New Progressive Party with Sim Sang-jung, Cho Seung-soo, and other members of the People's Democracy faction of the Democratic Labor Party. He unsuccessfully ran for Mayor of Seoul as a New Progressive Party candidate in 2010. He again served as a member of the National Assembly on behalf of the Unified Progressive Party and the Justice Party in 2012 to 2013. Roh broke with the Unified Progressive Party after allegations that the faction led by the party leader Lee Jung-hee had manipulated the party list to elect members of her own faction into the National Assembly. He, with Sim Sang-jeong and Rhyu Si-min, formed the Progressive Justice Party in October 2012, but in 2013 it became the Justice Party.

In 2005, he posted the names of the prosecutors implicated in corruption cases involving Samsung on the internet. He was charged with breaking Korea's communication secrecy act, and after a long legal battle, he was sentenced to 4 months in prison and given a 1-year suspended prison sentence in 2013.

He was again elected to the National Assembly, this time as a member of the Justice Party, in 2016.

In July 2018, Roh was under investigation into accusations that he had accepted ₩50 million from an aide to an influential blogger known as "Druking" while at the center of an opinion-rigging scandal.

== Personal life ==
Roh married fellow labor activist Kim Ji-sun in 1988. The couple had no children. Roh was a cello player from his elementary school days, and often dreamed of a society where every citizen could pick up a musical instrument.

== Election results ==
=== General elections ===
Year	Elections	Constituency	Political party	Votes (%)	Results
2004	17th National Assembly General Election	Proportional representation (8th)	DLP	2,774,061 (13.03%)	Elected
2008	18th National Assembly General Election	Nowon C (Seoul)	NPP	32,111 (40.06%)	Defeated (2nd)
2012	19th National Assembly General Election	Nowon C (Seoul)	UPP	52,270 (57.21%)	Won
2014	2014 By-election	Dongjak B (Seoul)	Justice	37,382 (48.69%)	Defeated (2nd)
2020	20th National Assembly General Election	Changwon Seongsan (South Gyeongsang)	Justice	61,897 (51.50%)	Won

=== Local elections ===
==== Mayor of Seoul ====
Year	Elections	Constituency	Political party	Votes (%)	Remarks
2010	5th Iocal Election	Seoul (Mayoral Elections)	NPP	143,459 (3.26%)	Defeated (3rd)

== Death ==
Roh committed suicide, aged 61, by jumping from his mother's apartment in Seoul on 23 July 2018. His death occurred during the course of the special prosecutor's investigations into the illegal political funds of Druking, the main perpetrator of the South Korean opinion-rigging scandal.

Roh's will, addressing the Justice Party and its membership, admitted receiving ₩40 million (approximately US$35,300) from Druking's organization but denied any form of favoritism in exchange for the campaign contribution. According to Political Fund Act which he supported, it is still illegal and guilty because the amount of money he has received already exceeds the legitimate scope.

In response to his death, South Korean President Moon Jae-in said Roh had made "big contributions to widening the spectrum of [South] Korean politics".
