= Kim Doo-kwan =

South Korean politician (born 1959)

Kim Doo-kwan 김두관
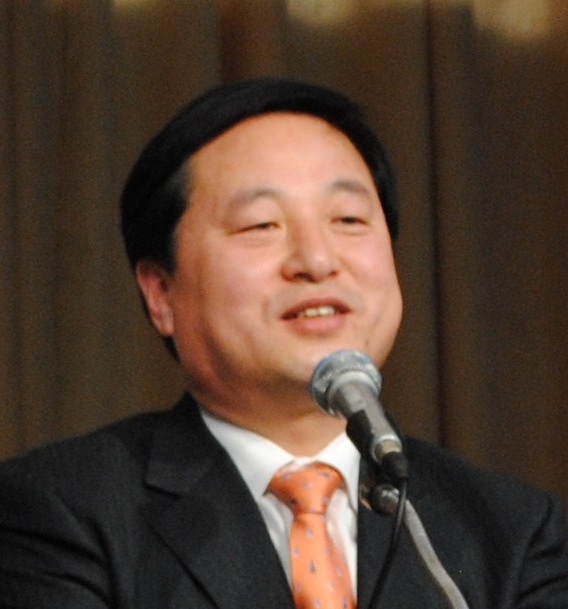
- Kim in 2012

Member of the National Assembly
- In office 30 May 2016 – 29 May 2020
- Preceded by: Hong Cheol-ho (Gimpo, Gyeonggi)
- Succeeded by: Kim ju-young
- Constituency: Gimpo A (Gyeonggi)
- In office 30 May 2020 – 29 May 2024
- Preceded by: Seo Hyung-soo
- Succeeded by: Kim Tae-ho
- Constituency: Yangsan B (South Gyeongsang)

Governor of South Gyeongsang Province
- In office 1 July 2010 – 6 July 2012
- Preceded by: Kim Tae-ho
- Succeeded by: Lim Chae-ho (acting); Hong Joon-pyo

Minister of the Interior
- In office 27 February 2003 – 18 September 2003
- President: Roh Moo-hyun
- Preceded by: Lee Keun-shik
- Succeeded by: Huh Sung-kwan

Personal details
- Born: 10 April 1959 (age 67) Namhae South Gyeongsang, South Korea
- Party: Democratic Party of Korea
- Education: Dong-A University

Korean name
- Hangul: 김두관
- Hanja: 金斗官
- RR: Gim Dugwan
- MR: Kim Tugwan

Dharma name
- Hangul: 웅기
- Hanja: 雄氣
- RR: Unggi
- MR: Unggi

Kim Doo-kwan (Korean: 김두관; born 10 April 1959) is a South Korean politician and former civil servant who served as the governor of South Gyeongsang Province from 2010 to 2012. A member of the Democratic Party of Korea (DPK), he was elected governor in the 2010 local elections as an independent after two previous unsuccessful attempts. Kim served as the minister for home affairs under the administration of Roh Moo-hyun, and at one point was seen as a potential contender for the DUP nomination in the 2012 presidential election.

== Early life and education ==
Kim Doo-kwan was born in a village in Namhae on 10 April 1959. He studied at the Department of Political Diplomacy of Dong-A University, graduating in 1987.

== Political career ==
After serving as Secretary-General of the Namhae farmers' association from 1987, Kim was prefect of Namhae County in the 1990s. He failed in a bid to become governor of South Gyeongsang in 2002. In 2003, he was chosen as Minister for Government Administration and Home Affairs by Roh Moo-hyun, but on 3 September of that year the National Assembly voted to dismiss him. He unsuccessfully contested Namhae in the 2004 National Assembly elections for the Uri Party, winning 16.9% of the vote. He subsequently lost a second attempt to become governor in 2006.

=== Governorship ===
In the 2010 local elections, Kim won an upset victory in the South Gyeongsang gubernatorial election as an independent candidate, and took office as governor on 1 July 2010. Despite originally promising to maintain his independence, in February 2011 he joined the Democratic United Party.

=== Party politics ===
After the party's defeat in the 2012 parliamentary elections, Kim emerged as an alternative candidate for the DUP nomination for that year's presidential election, though he had been considered as a potential frontrunner beforehand. He has been termed the "little Roh Moo-hyun" on account of his unprivileged background and his principles.

Kim declared his candidacy for the 2025 South Korean presidential election. However, he withdrew from the campaign on 18 April, after he had criticized the Democratic Party's rules in conducting its primaries as being biased in favor of another candidate.

== Election results ==
=== General elections ===
Year	Elections	Constituency	Political party	Votes (%)	Results
1988	13th National Assembly General Election	Namhae–Hadong (South Gyeongsang)	Popular's	9,783 (3.22%)	Defeated (3rd)
2004	17th National Assembly General Election	Namhae–Hadong (South Gyeongsang)	Uri	26,747 (41.96%)	Defeated (2nd)
2008	18th National Assembly General Election	Namhae–Hadong (South Gyeongsang)	Independent	24,966 (40.61%)	Defeated (2nd)
2014	2014 By-election	Gimpo (Gyeonggi)	NPAD	38,858 (43.10%)	Defeated (2nd)
2016	20th National Assembly General Election	Gimpo A (Gyeonggi)	Democratic	49,758 (59.30%)	Won
2020	21st National Assembly General Election	Yangsan B (South Gyeongsang)	Democratic	44,218 (48.94%)	Won
2024	22nd National Assembly General Election	Yangsan B (South Gyeongsang)	Democratic	48,600 (48.94%)	Defeated (2nd)

=== Local Elections ===
==== Governor of South Gyeongsang ====
Year	Elections	Constituency	Political party	Votes (%)	Results
2002	3rd Iocal Election	South Gyeongsang (Governoral Elections)	MDP	315,008 (16.88%)	Defeated (2nd)
2006	4th Iocal Election	South Gyeongsang (Governoral Elections)	Uri	343,137 (25.41%)	Defeated (2nd)
2010	5th Iocal Election	South Gyeongsang (Governoral Elections)	Independent	807,698 (53.54%)	Won

==== Mayor of South Gyeongsang Namhae ====
Year	Elections	Constituency	Political party	Votes (%)	Results
1995	1st Iocal Election	Mayor of South Gyeongsang Namhae	Independent	21,605 (55.61%)	Won
1998	2nd Iocal Election	Mayor of South Gyeongsang Namhae	Independent	18,612 (53.73%)	Won

National Assembly of the Republic of Korea
Preceded by Hong Cheol-ho (Gimpo, Gyeonggi)	Member of the Assembly for Gimpo A (Gyeonggi); 30 May 2016–29 May 2020	Succeeded by Kim Ju-young
Preceded by Seo Hyung-soo	Member of the Assembly for Yangsan B (South Gyeongsang); 30 May 2020–29 May 2024	Succeeded by Kim Tae-ho
Political offices
Preceded by Lee Young-don	Mayor of South Gyeongsang Namhae; 1 July 1995–13 April 2002	Succeeded by Koo Do-kwan (Acting); Ha Young-jae
Preceded by Lee Keun-shik	Minister of the Interior; 27 February 2003–18 September 2003	Succeeded by Huh Sung-kwan
Preceded by Kim Tae-ho	Governor of South Gyeongsang Province; 1 July 2010–6 July 2012	Succeeded by Lim Chae-ho (Acting); Hong Joon-pyo
