= Changwon National University =

National University in Changwon, South Korea

- 창원대학교
- Type: National
- Established: 1969
- Academic staff: 304
- Administrative staff: 319 (2019)
- Students: 12,927 (2019)
- Undergraduates: 11,497 (2019)
- Postgraduates: 1,430 (2019)
- Location: Changwon, South Korea; 35.24558°N 128.69192°E
- Colors: Dark Blue
- Website: changwon.ac.kr

Korean name
- Hangul: 창원대학교
- Hanja: 昌原大學校
- RR: Changwon daehakgyo
- MR: Ch'angwŏn taehakkyo

Changwon National University (CNU; Korean: 창원대학교) is a public institution of higher education located in Changwon, Gyeongsangn-do, South Korea.

== History ==
Initially opening as the Masan College of Education (Korean: 마산교육대학; RR: Masan Gyoyuk Daehak) on March 21st, 1969, the University moved to its current location in 1983 and changed its name to Changwon University in 1985. In 1991, it gained its accreditation as a public university.

- On November 2, 1999, CNU established the first Graduate School of Labor Studies among national universities.
- On August 18, 1999, it received ISO 9001 certification for undergraduate administration, a first among universities in South Korea.
- On June 18, 2004, the university was selected to participate in the New University for Regional Innovation (NURI) Project.
- On October 5, 2005, it received the Presidential Award at the Korea Regional Innovation Convention & Expo.
- On February 24, 2006, the university was recognized as an excellent institution by the Employment Support Reinforcement Program.
- On September 2, 2011, it was chosen as an Engineering Research Center (ERC) by the Leading Research Center Support Project.
- On April 18, 2017, the university was included in the Leaders in Industry-University Cooperation (LINC+) Project.
- On March 1, 2019, it was selected for the University Innovation Project.
- On April 28, 2020, the university was chosen for the Smart Manufacturing Human Resource Education Project.

== Academics ==
College of Humanities	College of Social Sciences	Business School	College of Natural Sciences
Dept. of Korean Language & Literature; Dept. of English Language & Literature; Dept. of German Language & Literature; Dept. of French Language & Literature; Dept. of Japanese Language & Literature; Dept. of History; Dept. of Philosophy; Dept. of Special Education; Dept. of Early Childhood Education	Dept. of Law; Dept. of Public Administration; Dept. of International Relations; Dept. of Chinese Studies; Dept. of Sociology; Dept. of Communication; Dept. of Family Welfare	Dept. of Global Business; Dept. of Business Administration; Dept. of Accounting; Dept. of Taxation Science; Dept. of International Trade	Dept. of Mathematics; Dept. of Physics; Dept. of Biology and Chemistry; Dept. of Statistics; Dept. of Bio Health Sciences; Dept. of Clothing & Textiles; Dept. of Food and Nutrition; Dept. of Physical Education; Dept. of Nursing
College of Engineering	College of Mechatronics	College of Arts	College of Future Convergence
School of Industrial Engineering and Naval Architecture; School of Civil, Environmental and Chemical Engineering; Dept. of Architecture; Dept. of Architectural Engineering; Dept. of Computer Engineering	Dept. of Mechanical Engineering; School of Electrical, Electronic & Control Engineering; School of Materials Science and Engineering; Dept. of Doosan Heavy Industries & Construction	Dept. of Music; Dept. of Fine Art; Dept. of Design; Dept. of Dance	College of Future Convergence; Dept. of Advanced Industry Fusion; Dept. of Mechatronics Convergence Engineering; Dept. of Asset Management; Dept. of Venture Convergence; Dept. of Anti-Aging and Health Care; Dept. of Industrial Business; Dept. of Energy Convergence Engineering

== Graduate Schools of Professional Studies ==
Humanities & Social Science	Natural Science	Engineering
Dept. of Korean Language & Literature; Dept. of English Language & Literature; Dept. of German Language & Literature; Dept. of French Language & Literature; Dept. of History; Dept. of Philosophy; Dept. of Education; Dept. of Special Education; Dept. of Early Childhood Education; Dept. of Law; Dept. of Public Administration; Dept. of International Relations; Dept. of Chinese Studies; Dept. of International Trade; Dept. of Business Administration; Dept. of Economics and Financial Information; Dept. of Accounting; Dept. of Taxation Science; Dept. of Culture Techno	Dept. of Mathematics and Statistics; Dept. of Physics; Dept. of Chemistry; Dept. of Biology and Microbiology; Dept. of Food and Nutrition; Dept. of Clothing & Textiles; Dept. of Health Science; Dept. of Nursing	Major of Mechanical Engineering; Major of Mechanical Design Engineering; Major of Electrical Engineering; Major of Electronic Engineering; Major of Control and Instrumentation Engineering; Dept. of Computer Engineering; Dept. of Industrial System Engineering; Dept. of Environmental Engineering; Dept. of Chemical System Engineering; Dept. of Civil Engineering; Dept. of Architectural Engineering; Dept. of Information & Communication Engineering; Dept. of Architecture; Dept. of Naval Architecture and Marine Engineering; Major of New Metal Materials Engineering; Major of Advanced Materials Convergence Engineering
	Arts & Physical Education	Interdisciplinary Programs
	Dept. of Music; Dept. of Fine Art; Dept. of Industrial Design; Dept. of Dance; Dept. of Physical Education	Biotechnology course; Advanced Materials and Nano Science Course; Bioinformatics Course; Eco-Friendly Offshore Plant FEED Cooperative Course; Advanced Defense Engineering Course

== Korean Language School ==
Korean Language School (KLS) is a language school under the Institute of International Affairs and Education at CWNU.

== See also ==
- List of colleges and universities in South Korea
- Education in South Korea
