= Opinion polling for the 2025 South Korean presidential election =

This article is a list of opinion polls that have been taken for the 2025 South Korean presidential election. It is divided into polls for intended candidates, and then for the presidential election itself. Two-way polls are used to demonstrate the popularity of one candidate with respect to another, but the election itself will have no run-off round and will be held under a system of first-past-the-post. The polls are ordered by date, with the newest at the top. For more information, visit the National Election Survey Deliberation Committee of Korea.

== Opinion polling ==
=== Polling average ===
Polling Average
Aggregation Firm	Fieldwork date	Updated date	Lee Jae-myung	Kim Moon-soo	Lee Jun-seok	Others/ Undecided	Lead
Opinion M (Final)	4 Oct 2024 – 27 May 2025	27 May 2025	46.8%	37.6%	9.5%	6.1%	9.2%
Poll-A (Final)	4 Apr 2025 – 30 May 2025	30 May 2025	46.0%	37.5%	9.1%	7.4%	8.5%
Meta-J (Final)	19 Jan 2025 – 27 May 2025	29 May 2025	47.4%	39.0%	9.8%	3.8%	8.4%
Election20 (Final)	11 Apr 2025 – 27 May 2025	29 May 2025	47.1%	37.9%	9.6%	5.4%	9.2%

=== Polling after nominees finalized ===
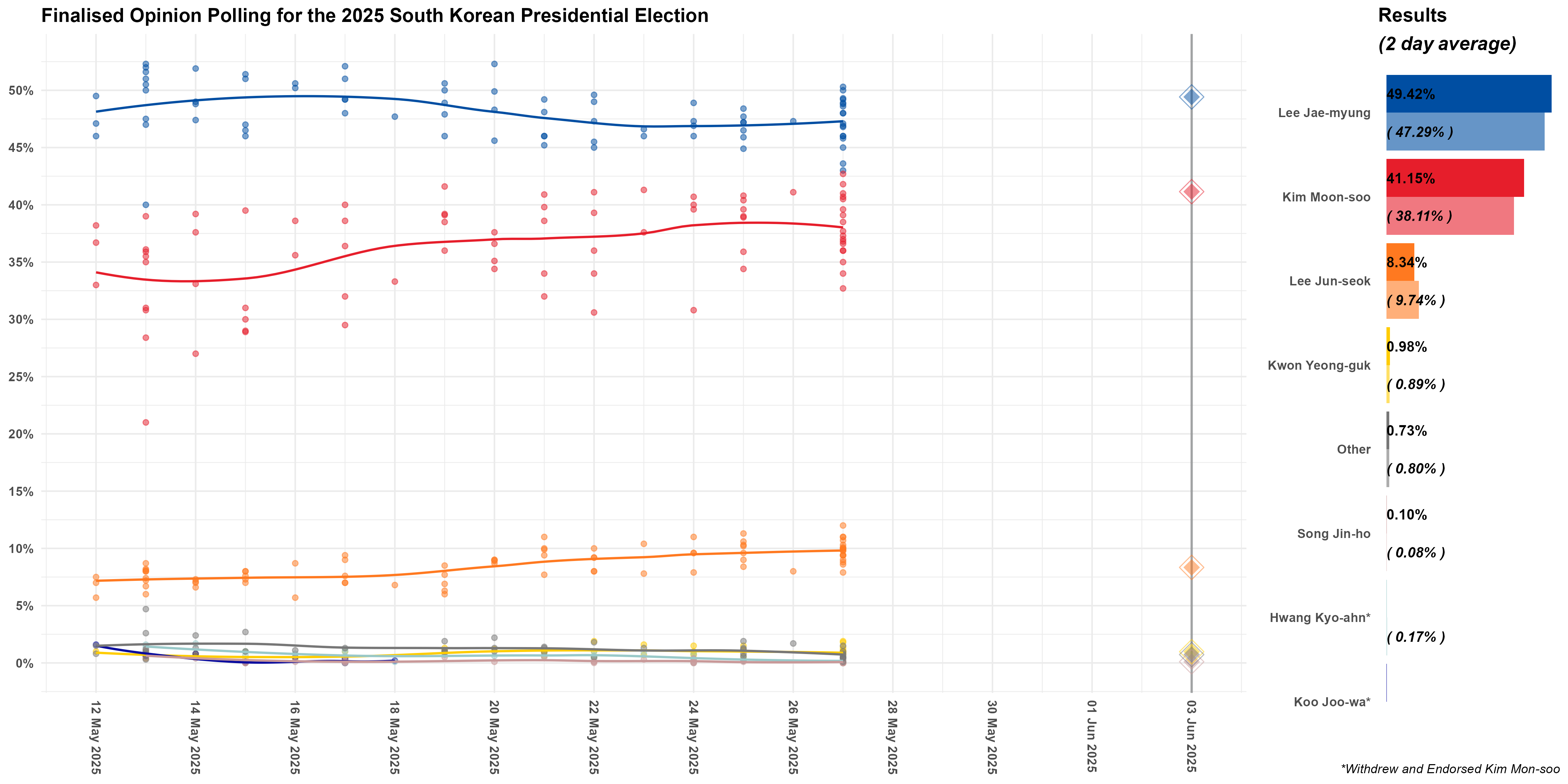
LOESS curve for the next South Korean presidential election since 12 May with a 2-day average

Fieldwork date	Sample size	Margin of error	Polling firm	DPK	PPP	RP	DLP	Ind.		LUP	Others	Und./ no ans.	Lead
Fieldwork date	Sample size	Margin of error	Polling firm	Lee Jae-myung	Kim Moon-soo	Lee Jun-seok	Kwon Yeong-guk	Song Jin-ho	Hwang Kyo-ahn	Koo Joo-wa	Others	Und./ no ans.	Lead
3 June 2025	35,236,497	2025 South Korean presidential election		49.42	41.15	8.34	0.98	0.10	—N/a	—N/a	0.73		8.27
3 June 2025	80,146	±0.8	KBS/MBC/SBS (Exit Poll)	51.7	39.3	7.7	1.3	0.1	—N/a	—N/a	—N/a	—N/a	12.4
3 June 2025	1,536	±2.5	KOPRA / Asia Today	47.3	42.7	5.7	2.4	0.7	—N/a	—N/a	—N/a	1.2	4.6
30 May–3 Jun 2025	12,077	±0.9	Metavoice / JTBC	44	37	7	1	0	0	—N/a	—N/a	11	7
31 May–2 Jun 2025	3,004	±1.8	Flower Research	49.6	33.8	6.6	1.1	0.1	0.3	—N/a	—N/a	9.5	15.8
1 June 2025	Hwang Kyo-ahn (Ind.) withdraws as a candidate and endorses Kim Moon-soo (PPP)												
27 May–3 June 2025	A period of time during which the results of polls predicting party support or the winner of an election may not be published or quoted.												
27 May 2025	1,012	±3.1	Jowon C&I / Straight News	50.0	37.3	9.4	—N/a	—N/a	—N/a	—N/a	1.5	1.7	12.7
27 May 2025	1,544	±2.5	Hangil Research / Polinews	45.8	40.7	8.6	1.0	—N/a	—N/a	—N/a	0.8	3.2	5.1
27 May 2025	1,000	±3.1	KOPRA / Asia Today	46	41	9	1	0	0	—N/a	—N/a	2	5
26–27 May 2025	1,039	±3.0	Media Tomato / News Tomato	48.6	38.5	10.1	1.2	—N/a	—N/a	—N/a	0.4	1.2	10.1
26–27 May 2025	1,005	±3.1	Metavoice / JTBC	48	35	12	0	0	0	—N/a	—N/a	4	13
26–27 May 2025	1,000	±3.1	Researchview / KPI News	46.8	40.5	9.8	0.9	—N/a	0.5	—N/a	0.1	1.5	6.3
26–27 May 2025	1,000	±3.1	Korea Research / MBC	43	36	11	0	0	0	—N/a	—N/a	9	7
26–27 May 2025	5,028	±1.4	Metavoice / OhmyNews	47.1	39.1	9.8	0.9	0.4	0.5	—N/a	—N/a	2.2	8.0
26–27 May 2025	1,003	±3.1	Gallup Korea / SEDaily	46	37	11	0	—N/a	0	—N/a	—N/a	5	9
26–27 May 2025	2,011	±2.2	Flower Research	50.3	32.7	9.4	0.9	—N/a	0.4	—N/a	—N/a	6.5	17.6
26–27 May 2025	1,003	±3.1	Realmeter / EKN	49.2	36.8	10.3	0.7	0.2	0.4	—N/a	—N/a	2.4	12.4
26–27 May 2025	1,014	±3.1	Ace Research / Newsis	48.9	39.6	9.9	0.5	—N/a	—N/a	—N/a	0.5	1.2	9.3
26–27 May 2025	1,005	±3.1	KSOI / CBS	49.3	36.6	9.4	1.9	0.1	0.3	—N/a	—N/a	2.3	12.7
26–27 May 2025	1,000	±3.1	Gongjung / Dailian	43.6	42.7	8.8	1.8	0	0	—N/a	0.7	2.4	1.1
25–27 May 2025	1,003	±3.1	Ipsos / SBS	48	34	10	1	0	0	—N/a	—N/a	8	14
25–27 May 2025	6,001	±1.3	Research Min / Newdaily	46.9	41.8	7.9	1.4	—N/a	—N/a	—N/a	0.5	1.4	5.1
25–27 May 2025	1,000	±3.1	Hankook Research / KBS	45	36	10	1	0	0	—N/a	—N/a	8	9
24–27 May 2025	15,008	±0.8	Flower Research	48.8	37.7	10.7	—N/a	—N/a	—N/a	—N/a	1.0	1.8	11.1
25–26 May 2025	1,000	±3.1	Media Research / Newspim	47.3	41.1	8.0	—N/a	—N/a	—N/a	—N/a	1.7	1.9	6.2
24–25 May 2025	1,008	±3.1	Research&Research / Dong-A Ilbo	45.9	34.4	11.3	—N/a	—N/a	—N/a	—N/a	1.2	7.2	11.5
24–25 May 2025	2,004	±2.2	Jowon C&I / Straight News	47.7	38.9	10.2	—N/a	—N/a	—N/a	—N/a	1.3	2.0	8.8
24–25 May 2025	3,028	±1.8	Ace Research / LPK	46.5	40.4	10.3	—N/a	—N/a	—N/a	—N/a	0.8	2.0	6.1
24–25 May 2025	1,010	±3.1	Jowon C&I / Hanyang Economy	47.2	39.0	10.6	—N/a	—N/a	—N/a	—N/a	1.9	1.4	8.2
24–25 May 2025	1,011	±3.1	Gongjung / PennMike	47.2	40.8	9.0	1.1	—N/a	—N/a	—N/a	0.2	1.7	6.4
24–25 May 2025	2,008	±2.2	Research Min / Newdaily	48.4	39.6	8.4	1.5	—N/a	—N/a	—N/a	0.6	1.5	8.8
23–25 May 2025	1,003	±3.1	Next Research / MBN	44.9	35.9	9.6	0.5	0.1	0.4	—N/a	—N/a	8.7	9.0
24 May 2025	1,001	±3.1	KOPRA / Asia Today	46	40	11	1	0	0	—N/a	—N/a	1	6
23–24 May 2025	2,004	±2.2	Flower Research	48.9	30.8	9.6	0.7	0.1	0.3	—N/a	—N/a	9.5	18.1
23–24 May 2025	1,001	±3.1	KSOI / CBS	47.3	39.6	9.6	1.5	0.0	0.3	—N/a	—N/a	1.6	7.7
23–24 May 2025	1,016	±3.1	KIR / Cheonjiilbo	46.9	40.7	7.9	0.8	0.4	0.8	—N/a	—N/a	2.5	6.2
22–23 May 2025	1,009	±3.1	Realmeter / EKN	46.6	37.6	10.4	1.6	0.3	0.9	—N/a	—N/a	2.5	9.0
22–23 May 2025	1,000	±3.1	Hangil Research / Polinews	46.0	41.3	7.8	0.7	—N/a	—N/a	—N/a	1.3	2.9	4.7
21–22 May 2025	1,007	±3.1	Gongjung / PennMike	45.5	41.1	9.2	—N/a	—N/a	—N/a	—N/a	1.8	2.4	4.4
21–22 May 2025	2,005	±2.2	Flower Research	49.6	30.6	9.2	0.5	0.1	0.4	—N/a	—N/a	9.6	19.0
21–22 May 2025	1,002	±3.1	KIR / Cheonjiilbo	47.3	39.3	8.0	1.9	0.1	0.6	—N/a	—N/a	2.8	8.0
20–22 May 2025	3,000	±1.8	Hankook Research / KBS	49	34	8	1	0	1	—N/a	—N/a	7	15
20–22 May 2025	1,002	±3.1	Gallup Korea	45	36	10	—N/a	—N/a	—N/a	—N/a	0.5	8	9
21 May 2025	1,009	±3.1	WinG Korea / Voice of Seoul	49.2	39.8	7.7	—N/a	—N/a	—N/a	—N/a	0.9	2.4	9.4
20–21 May 2025	1,007	±3.1	Gallup Korea / KARN	46	34	11	1	—N/a	—N/a	—N/a	—N/a	8	12
20–21 May 2025	1,002	±3.1	EveryResearch / Newsspirit	45.2	40.9	9.9	—N/a	—N/a	—N/a	—N/a	1.4	2.5	4.3
20–21 May 2025	1,012	±3.1	Realmeter / EKN	48.1	38.6	9.4	0.6	0.5	0.6	—N/a	1.3	0.8	9.5
19–21 May 2025	1,002	±3.1	NBS (Note: Embrain Public, KStat Research, Korea Research, Hankook Research)	46	32	10	1	—N/a	—N/a	—N/a	—N/a	10	14
19–20 May 2025	1,014	±3.1	Research&Research / Channel A	45.6	34.4	9.0	—N/a	—N/a	—N/a	—N/a	1.3	9.8	11.2
19–20 May 2025	1,000	±3.1	Media Research / Newspim	49.9	36.6	8.7	—N/a	—N/a	—N/a	—N/a	2.2	2.7	13.3
19–20 May 2025	1,002	±3.1	KIR / Cheonjiilbo	48.3	37.6	8.9	1.2	0.1	0.6	—N/a	—N/a	3.3	10.7
17–20 May 2025	15,009	±0.8	Flower Research	52.3	35.1	9.0	—N/a	—N/a	—N/a	—N/a	1.0	2.7	17.2
19 May 2025	1,000	±3.1	Every Research	46.0	41.6	8.5	1.1	0.5	0.7	—N/a	—N/a	1.5	4.4
18–19 May 2025	1,004	±3.1	Ace Research / Newsis	50.6	39.2	6.3	—N/a	—N/a	—N/a	—N/a	1.1	2.7	11.4
18–19 May 2025	1,001	±3.1	Embrain Public / YTN	50	36	6	—N/a	—N/a	—N/a	—N/a	1	7	14
17–19 May 2025	2,002	±2.2	Jowon C&I / Straight News	47.9	38.5	7.7	—N/a	—N/a	—N/a	—N/a	1.9	3.4	9.4
17–19 May 2025	1,017	±3.1	Hangil Research / Polinews	48.9	39.1	6.9	1.3	—N/a	—N/a	—N/a	0.9	2.8	9.8
19 May 2025	Koo Joo-Wa (LUP) withdraws as a candidate and endorses Kim Moon-soo (PPP)												
16-18 May 2025	1,007	±3.1	Next Research / MBN	47.7	33.3	6.8	—N/a	—N/a	0.1	0.2	—N/a	11.9	14.4
17 May 2025	1,005	±3.1	KOPRA / Asia Today	48	40	9	1	0	1	0	—N/a	2	8
16–17 May 2025	1,002	±3.1	Ipsos / Korea Economic Daily	51	32	7	0	—N/a	0	0	—N/a	10	19
16–17 May 2025	2,007	±2.2	Flower Research	52.1	29.5	7.0	0.3	0.1	0.6	0.2	—N/a	10.2	22.6
16–17 May 2025	2,005	±2.2	Research Min / Newdaily	49.2	38.6	7.6	—N/a	—N/a	—N/a	—N/a	1.3	3.3	10.6
16–17 May 2025	1,007	±3.1	KSOI / CBS	49.2	36.4	9.4	0.4	0.2	1.2	0.4	—N/a	3.0	12.8
15–16 May 2025	1,005	±3.1	KIR / Cheonjiilbo	50.6	38.6	5.7	0.3	0.1	0.8	0.5	—N/a	3.4	12.0
14–16 May 2025	1,509	±2.5	Realmeter / EKN	50.2	35.6	8.7	—N/a	—N/a	—N/a	—N/a	1.1	4.4	14.6
14–15 May 2025	1,001	±3.1	Gongjung / PennMike	46.5	39.5	7.3	—N/a	—N/a	—N/a	—N/a	2.7	4.0	7.0
14–15 May 2025	1,003	±3.1	Korea Research / MBC	47	30	7	0	0	1	—N/a	—N/a	15	17
14–15 May 2025	2,012	±2.2	Flower Research	51.4	28.9	7.6	0.3	—N/a	0.7	0.1	—N/a	11.1	22.5
13–15 May 2025	1,000	±3.1	Hankook Research / KBS	46	31	8	1	0	1	0	—N/a	12	15
13–15 May 2025	1,004	±3.1	Gallup Korea	51	29	8	—N/a	—N/a	—N/a	—N/a	1	12	22
14 May 2025	1,000	±3.1	WinG Korea / Voice of Seoul	48.8	37.6	7.3	—N/a	—N/a	—N/a	—N/a	2.4	4.0	11.2
13–14 May 2025	1005	±3.1	Realmeter / Media Tribune	51.9	33.1	6.6	0.6	0.4	1.7	0.8	—N/a	4.9	18.8
13–14 May 2025	1,002	±3.1	Hangil Research / Polinews	47.4	39.2	7.1	0.8	—N/a	—N/a	—N/a	1.3	4.1	8.2
12–14 May 2025	1,000	±3.1	NBS	49	27	7	—N/a	—N/a	—N/a	—N/a	—N/a	16	22
13 May 2025	1,004	±3.1	KOPRA / Asia Today	47	39	8	1	—N/a	1	—N/a	—N/a	4	8
12–13 May 2025	3,000	±1.8	Hankook Research / Hankook Ilbo	40	21	6	—N/a	—N/a	—N/a	—N/a	1	32	19
12–13 May 2025	1,009	±3.1	Metavoice / OhmyNews	47.5	36.1	8.7	0.4	1.1	1.6	0.6	0.3	3.8	11.4
12–13 May 2025	2,004	±2.2	Flower Research	52.0	28.4	7.4	—N/a	—N/a	—N/a	—N/a	0.8	11.5	23.6
12–13 May 2025	1,033	±3.0	Media Tomato / News Tomato	52.3	35.9	6.7	—N/a	—N/a	—N/a	—N/a	1.2	3.9	16.4
12–13 May 2025	1,000	±3.1	Media Research / Newspim	51.6	35.5	7.2	—N/a	—N/a	—N/a	—N/a	2.6	3.2	16.1
12–13 May 2025	1,002	±3.1	KIR / Cheonjiilbo	50.5	30.8	8.1	—N/a	—N/a	—N/a	—N/a	4.7	5.8	19.7
12–13 May 2025	1,002	±3.1	Gallup Korea	51	31	8	—N/a	—N/a	—N/a	—N/a	—N/a	9.0	20
12–13 May 2025	1,009	±3.1	Gongjung / PennMike	50.0	35.0	8.2	0.6	0.4	1.4	0.7	—N/a	3.7	15
12 May 2025	1,000	±3.1	Every Research	47.1	36.7	7.5	1.0	—N/a	—N/a	1.6	0.8	5.2	10.4
11–12 May 2025	1,513	±2.5	Hangil Research / Global Economic	49.5	38.2	5.7	—N/a	—N/a	—N/a	—N/a	1.5	5.0	11.3
11–12 May 2025	1,003	±3.1	Embrain Public / YTN	46	33	7	—N/a	—N/a	—N/a	—N/a	—N/a	13	13

=== Polling before nominees finalized ===
LOESS curve for the next South Korean presidential election before nominees were finalised with a 5-day average

Fieldwork date	Sample size	Margin of error	Polling firm	DPK			PPP							RKP	RP	NFP		Others	Und./ no ans.	Lead
Fieldwork date	Sample size	Margin of error	Polling firm	Lee Jae-myung	Kim Dong-yeon	Kim Kyoung-soo	Han Dong-hoon	Oh Se-hoon	Hong Joon-pyo	Yoo Seong-min	Won Hee-ryong	Ahn Cheol-soo	Kim Moon-soo	Cho Kuk	Lee Jun-seok	Lee Nak-yon	Han Duck-soo	Others	Und./ no ans.	Lead
10 May 2025	1,001	±3.1	Hangil Research / Polinews	44.8	—N/a	—N/a	—N/a	—N/a	—N/a	—N/a	—N/a	—N/a	28.6	—N/a	6.3	—N/a	—N/a	8.0	12.2	16.2
9–10 May 2025	2,002	±2.2	Flower Research	51.9	—N/a	—N/a	—N/a	—N/a	—N/a	—N/a	—N/a	—N/a	11.7	—N/a	4.5	1.4	16.4	1.6	12.4	35.5
9–10 May 2025	1,002	±3.1	KSOI / CBS	45.9	—N/a	—N/a	—N/a	—N/a	—N/a	—N/a	—N/a	—N/a	19.9	—N/a	7.7	—N/a	21.6	2.1	2.8	24.3
9 May 2025	2,001	±2.2	KOPRA / Asia Today	48	—N/a	—N/a	—N/a	—N/a	—N/a	—N/a	—N/a	—N/a	20	—N/a	6	—N/a	18	4	3	28
7–9 May 2025	1,508	±2.5	Realmeter / EKN	51.6	—N/a	—N/a	—N/a	—N/a	—N/a	—N/a	—N/a	—N/a	20.8	—N/a	4.5	—N/a	17.5	2.2	3.3	30.8
7–8 May 2025	1,004	±3.1	Metavoice / OhmyNews	49.2	—N/a	—N/a	—N/a	—N/a	—N/a	—N/a	—N/a	—N/a	27.4	—N/a	5.2	—N/a	—N/a	13.8	4.4	21.8
7–8 May 2025	1,004	±3.1	Metavoice / OhmyNews	49.5	—N/a	—N/a	—N/a	—N/a	—N/a	—N/a	—N/a	—N/a	—N/a	—N/a	5.1	—N/a	30.5	11.0	3.9	19.0
7–8 May 2025	2,006	±2.2	Flower Research	52.8	—N/a	—N/a	—N/a	—N/a	—N/a	—N/a	—N/a	—N/a	21.6	—N/a	5.8	—N/a	—N/a	7.1	12.7	31.2
7–8 May 2025	2,006	±2.2	Flower Research	51.4	—N/a	—N/a	—N/a	—N/a	—N/a	—N/a	—N/a	—N/a	—N/a	—N/a	5.7	—N/a	28.1	1.9	12.8	23.3
6–8 May 2025	3,000	±1.8	Hankook Research / KBS	48	—N/a	—N/a	—N/a	—N/a	—N/a	—N/a	—N/a	—N/a	14	—N/a	5	—N/a	19	3	11	29
6–7 May 2025	1,014	±3.1	Gallup Korea / SEDaily	50	—N/a	—N/a	—N/a	—N/a	—N/a	—N/a	—N/a	—N/a	11	—N/a	6	—N/a	23	1	10	27
5–7 May 2025	1,000	±3.1	NBS	43	—N/a	—N/a	—N/a	—N/a	—N/a	—N/a	—N/a	—N/a	12	—N/a	5	—N/a	23	2	15	20
5–6 May 2025	1,003	±3.1	Ipsos / SBS	48	—N/a	—N/a	—N/a	—N/a	—N/a	—N/a	—N/a	—N/a	17	—N/a	4	2	16	1	12	31
3–6 May 2025	15,001	±0.8	Flower Research	52.3	—N/a	—N/a	4.3	—N/a	—N/a	—N/a	—N/a	—N/a	12.2	—N/a	4.6	2.7	19.6	1.5	2.8	32.7
4–5 May 2025	1,012	±3.1	Research&Research / Dong-A Ilbo	47.9	—N/a	—N/a	—N/a	—N/a	—N/a	—N/a	—N/a	—N/a	15.9	—N/a	4.7	—N/a	13.9	1.8	15.8	32.0
4–5 May 2025	1,007	±3.1	Embrain Public / YTN	45	—N/a	—N/a	—N/a	—N/a	—N/a	—N/a	—N/a	—N/a	12	—N/a	4	—N/a	18	2	19	27
4 May 2025	1,006	±3.1	Korea Research / MBC	46	—N/a	—N/a	—N/a	—N/a	—N/a	—N/a	—N/a	—N/a	12	—N/a	4	—N/a	19	1	18	27
3–4 May 2025	1,000	±3.1	Researchview / KPI News	52.9	—N/a	—N/a	—N/a	—N/a	—N/a	—N/a	—N/a	—N/a	13.8	—N/a	4.2	3.1	22.5	1.7	1.8	39.1
2–3 May 2025	2,010	±2.2	Flower Research	47.3	—N/a	—N/a	9.1	—N/a	—N/a	—N/a	—N/a	—N/a	6.4	—N/a	3.0	1.7	19.0	1.3	12.1	28.3
1 May 2025	Acting President Han resigns as Prime Minister and Acting President; Deputy Prime Minister Lee Ju-ho becomes acting president																			
30 Apr–2 May 2025	1,000	±3.1	Researchview	47	—N/a	—N/a	—N/a	—N/a	—N/a	—N/a	—N/a	—N/a	15	—N/a	4	4	21	7	2	32
30 Apr–2 May 2025	1,502	±2.5	Realmeter / EKN	46.5	—N/a	—N/a	—N/a	—N/a	—N/a	—N/a	—N/a	—N/a	—N/a	—N/a	5.9	—N/a	34.3	—N/a	13.3	12.2
30 Apr–2 May 2025	1,502	±2.5	Realmeter / EKN	46.6	—N/a	—N/a	—N/a	—N/a	—N/a	—N/a	—N/a	—N/a	27.8	—N/a	7.5	—N/a	—N/a	—N/a	18.1	18.8
28–30 Apr 2025	1,000	±3.1	NBS	42	—N/a	—N/a	9	—N/a	—N/a	—N/a	—N/a	—N/a	6	—N/a	2	—N/a	13	10	18	29
26–29 Apr 2025	15,007	±0.8	Flower Research	47.8	1.3	0.8	9.5	—N/a	8.4	—N/a	—N/a	2.5	6.9	—N/a	3.6	2.5	13.1	1.1	2.4	34.7
26 Apr 2025	1,012	±3.1	Research&Research / Channel A	46.0	0.9	0.4	8.5	—N/a	6.4	—N/a	—N/a	1.9	7.2	—N/a	2.9	—N/a	11.2	2.3	12.3	34.8
25–26 Apr 2025	1,001	±3.1	Flower Research	45.9	1.5	0.4	8.4	—N/a	8.2	—N/a	—N/a	2.7	5.6	—N/a	2.3	1.8	10.4	1.0	11.8	35.5
24–25 Apr 2025	1,009	±3.1	Korea Research / MBC	43	1	1	8	—N/a	9	—N/a	—N/a	3	6	—N/a	3	—N/a	10	1	15	33
23–24 Apr 2025	1,010	±3.1	Kstat / TV Chosun	44	1	0	8	—N/a	8	—N/a	—N/a	4	8	—N/a	2	—N/a	12	1	11	32
23–24 Apr 2025	1,004	±3.1	Embrain Public / YTN	43	1	0	10	—N/a	7	—N/a	—N/a	3	7	—N/a	2	—N/a	9	3	15	33
22–24 Apr 2025	3,000	±1.8	Hankook Research / KBS	42	1	1	9	—N/a	8	1	—N/a	2	7	—N/a	3	—N/a	11	2	13	31
22–24 Apr 2025	1,005	±3.1	Gallup Korea	38	1	—N/a	8	—N/a	7	—N/a	—N/a	2	6	1	2	1	6	3	23	30
21–23 Apr 2025	1,005	±3.1	NBS	41	2	1	8	—N/a	10	—N/a	—N/a	3	10	—N/a	3	—N/a	—N/a	4 (Note: Na Kyung-won 2, Others 2)	18	31
18–19 Apr 2025	1,003	±3.1	Flower Research	48.2	1.8	0.6	4.8	—N/a	6.6	0.8	—N/a	2.4	5.7	—N/a	1.7	2.0	11.4	2.3 (Note: Na Kyung-won 1.9, Others 0.4)	11.6	36.7
18–19 Apr 2025	1,005	±3.1	KSOI / CBS	46.1	1.1	0.6	8.1	—N/a	9.0	—N/a	—N/a	2.4	8.2	—N/a	4.7	—N/a	10.6	6.7 (Note: Na Kyung-won 3.3, Others 3.4)	2.4	35.5
16–18 Apr 2025	1,504	±2.5	Realmeter / EKN	50.2	2.0	1.8	8.5	—N/a	7.5	—N/a	—N/a	3.7	12.2	—N/a	3.5	—N/a	—N/a	7.1 (Note: Na Kyung-won 4.0, Others 3.1)	3.5	38.0
15–17 Apr 2025	1,000	±3.1	Gallup Korea	38	—N/a	—N/a	6	—N/a	7	—N/a	—N/a	—N/a	7	—N/a	2	—N/a	7	7	26	31
15–16 Apr 2025	1,001	±3.1	KIR / Cheonjiilbo	49.4	2.3	1.3	8.0	—N/a	6.1	—N/a	—N/a	—N/a	9.0	—N/a	—N/a	2.8	12.8	3.5	4.8	36.6
14–16 Apr 2025	1,001	±3.1	NBS	39	2	1	6	—N/a	8	—N/a	—N/a	3	8	—N/a	3	—N/a	—N/a	5 (Note: Na Kyung-won 2, Others 3)	23	31
12–13 Apr 2025	1,022	±3.1	Rnsearch	44.9	0.6	1.0	7.2	1.3	4.4	2.4	—N/a	1.5	11.1	—N/a	3.4	—N/a	—N/a	5.8 (Note: Na Kyung-won 3.3, Others 2.5)	3.7	33.8
11–12 Apr 2025	1,003	±3.1	Korea Research / MBC	42	1	1	7	3	7	1	—N/a	3	10	—N/a	2	—N/a	—N/a	6 (Note: Na Kyung-won 2, Others 4)	17	32
11–12 Apr 2025	1,002	±3.1	Flower Research	46.7	1.2	0.4	6.8	2.4	5.7	1.7	—N/a	2.4	10.0	—N/a	2.4	1.9	—N/a	2.9 (Note: Kim Doo-kwan 0.2, Others 2.7)	15.6	36.7
11–12 Apr 2025	1,002	±3.1	KSOI / CBS	45.5	1.6	1.0	10.0	2.3	6.4	2.2	—N/a	3.1	12.5	—N/a	3.3	—N/a	—N/a	9.0 (Note: Na Kyung-won 3.5, Kim Doo-kwan 0.4, Others 5.1)	3.1	33.0
9–11 Apr 2025	1,506	±2.5	Realmeter / EKN	48.8	1.2	1.3	6.2	2.6	5.2	2.7	—N/a	2.4	10.9	—N/a	3.0	—N/a	8.6	3.9 (Note: Kim Doo-kwan 0.9, Others 3.0)	6.1	33.2
8–10 Apr 2025	3,000	±1.8	Hankook Research / KBS	38	2	1	5	4	6	2	1	3	13	—N/a	3	—N/a	—N/a	5 (Note: Kim Boo-kyum 1, Others 4)	18	25
8–10 Apr 2025	1,005	±3.1	Gallup Korea	37	—N/a	—N/a	4	2	5	1	—N/a	2	9	—N/a	2	1	2	4	30	28
8–9 Apr 2025	1,004	±3.1	Gallup Korea / JoongAngIlbo	42	3	1	6	5	9	—N/a	—N/a	—N/a	12	—N/a	3	—N/a	—N/a	4 (Note: Kim Boo-kyum 1, Others 3)	14	30
8–9 Apr 2025	1,000	±3.1	Media Research / Newspim	47.6	1.9	2.1	4.9	3.7	4.3	1.8	1.1	2.1	17.9	—N/a	1.7	—N/a	—N/a	6.5 (Note: Woo Won-shik 0.8, Kim Boo-kyum 0.7, Kim Doo-kwan 0.7, Others 4.3)	4.4	29.7
7–9 Apr 2025	1,001	±3.1	NBS	32	1	1	5	5	7	2	—N/a	4	12	—N/a	2	—N/a	—N/a	3 (Note: Kim Boo-kyum 1, Others 2)	27	20
5–7 Apr 2025	2,001	±2.2	Jowon C&I / Straight News	46.2	2.0	0.9	7.2	4.4	6.4	—N/a	—N/a	—N/a	17.0	—N/a	3.4	—N/a	—N/a	5.8 (Note: Kim Boo-kyum 1.4, Lee Cheol-woo 0.8, Others 3.6)	6.7	29.2
5–6 Apr 2025	2,090	±2.1	Embrain Public / MBC	30	3	1	6	4	5	2	—N/a	4	6	—N/a	2	—N/a	—N/a	7 (Note: Kim Boo-kyum 1, Others 6)	28	24
4–5 Apr 2025	1,012	±3.1	Gallup Korea / Sedaily	40	—N/a	—N/a	4	3	4	—N/a	—N/a	—N/a	7	2	2	—N/a	—N/a	8	30	33
4–5 Apr 2025	1,006	±3.1	Flower Research	45.3	0.9	—N/a	5.5	4.2	6.1	—N/a	—N/a	3.0	7.8	—N/a	2.7	—N/a	—N/a	3.8 (Note: Woo Won-shik 2.0, Others 1.8)	20.7	37.5
4–5 Apr 2025	1,003	±3.1	KSOI / CBS	44.3	1.6	1.3	7.6	5.2	7.6	2.9	—N/a	—N/a	12.7	—N/a	3.1	2.9	—N/a	4.3 (Note: Kim Boo-kyum 1.1, Others 3.2)	4.6	31.6
4 April 2025	The Constitutional Court upholds President Yoon's impeachment, removing him from office																			
1–3 Apr 2025	1,001	±3.1	Gallup Korea	34	—N/a	—N/a	5	2	4	—N/a	—N/a	—N/a	9	1	1	1	—N/a	5	38	25
31 Mar–2 Apr 2025	1,001	±3.1	NBS	33	2	0	4	4	4	2	—N/a	2	9	—N/a	1	—N/a	—N/a	2 (Note: Kim Boo-kyum 1, Others 1)	36	24
30–31 Mar 2025	1,000	±3.1	Researchview / KPI News	46.6	2.5	1.1	5.1	5.2	6.3	1.5	—N/a	1.4	17.1	—N/a	2.5	3.3	—N/a	2.9 (Note: Kim Boo-kyum 1.9, Others 1.0)	4.5	29.5
28–29 Mar 2025	1,006	±3.1	KSOI / CBS	49.9	1.3	0.6	8.8	6.0	8.8	—N/a	—N/a	2.2	12.9	—N/a	2.8	—N/a	—N/a	4.3 (Note: Kim Boo-kyum 0.7, Others 2.6)	5.4	37.0
26–28 Mar 2025	1,510	±2.5	Realmeter / EKN	49.5	1.8	0.8	6.7	4.8	7.1	1.6	—N/a	—N/a	16.3	—N/a	—N/a	1.6	—N/a	3.6 (Note: Kim Boo-kyum 1.4, Others 2.2)	6.1	33.2
25–27 Mar 2025	1,000	±3.1	Gallup Korea	34	—N/a	—N/a	5	3	3	—N/a	—N/a	1	8	2	—N/a	—N/a	—N/a	6	37	26
24–26 Mar 2025	1,001	±3.1	NBS	31	2	1	5	5	6	2	—N/a	2	8	—N/a	1	—N/a	—N/a	2 (Note: Kim Boo-kyum 1, Others 1)	34	23
23–24 Mar 2025	1,000	±3.1	Researchview / KPI News	48.3	3.1	1.3	5.7	4.9	6.5	1.5	—N/a	2.7	16.4	—N/a	2.8	1.7	—N/a	1.9 (Note: Kim Boo-kyum 1.0, Others 0.9)	3.3	31.9
22–24 Mar 2025	2,012	±2.2	Jowon C&I / Straight News	46.3	2.3	0.9	6.5	6.2	7.2	—N/a	—N/a	—N/a	16.1	—N/a	2.2	—N/a	—N/a	4.1 (Note: Kim Boo-kyum 1.2, Lee Cheol-woo 0.7, Others 2.2)	8.2	30.2
24 March 2025	The Constitutional Court overturns Acting President Han's impeachment, reinstating him to office																			
21–22 Mar 2025	1,000	±3.1	KSOI / CBS	44.8	2.5	1.0	6.5	6.9	6.8	—N/a	—N/a	2.7	15.4	—N/a	3.3	—N/a	—N/a	4.5 (Note: Kim Boo-kyum 1.4, Others 3.1)	5.6	29.4
18–20 Mar 2025	1,003	±3.1	Gallup Korea	36	—N/a	—N/a	4	4	3	—N/a	—N/a	—N/a	9	—N/a	1	—N/a	—N/a	5	37	27
17–19 Mar 2025	1,003	±3.1	NBS	33	2	0	4	5	5	2	—N/a	3	10	—N/a	2	—N/a	—N/a	3 (Note: Kim Boo-kyum 1, Others 2)	31	23
16–17 Mar 2025	1,000	±3.1	Researchview / KPI News	44.2	2.4	1.8	6.2	6.5	7.1	1.6	—N/a	2.3	18.3	—N/a	1.8	1.8	—N/a	2.2 (Note: Kim Boo-kyum 1.0, Others 1.2)	4.0	25.9
15–16 Mar 2025	1,002	±3.1	Ace Research / Newsis	45.1	2.5	0.4	5.4	5.1	4.9	1.6	1.4	1.3	17.3	—N/a	0.9	1.5	—N/a	5.0 (Note: Na Kyung-won 2.8, Woo Won-shik 1.3, Kim Boo-kyum 0.7, Others 0.2)	7.6	27.8
15–16 Mar 2025	1,000	±3.1	KSOI / CBS	47.2	2.0	0.6	5.7	5.5	6.4	—N/a	—N/a	1.4	16.7	—N/a	2.5	—N/a	—N/a	5.5 (Note: Kim Boo-kyum 1.8, Others 3.7)	6.5	30.5
12–14 Mar 2025	1,510	±2.5	Realmeter / EKN	46.9	1.2	0.4	6.3	6.2	6.5	2.4	—N/a	—N/a	18.1	—N/a	—N/a	2.2	—N/a	3.6 (Note: Kim Boo-kyum 0.8, Others 2.8)	6.3	27.4
11–13 Mar 2025	1,001	±3.1	Gallup Korea	34	—N/a	—N/a	6	4	3	—N/a	—N/a	—N/a	10	2	1	—N/a	—N/a	6	35	24
8–10 Mar 2025	2,001	±2.2	Jowon C&I / Straight News	42.8	2.2	1.2	8.4	6.2	6.4	—N/a	—N/a	—N/a	19.1	—N/a	2.5	—N/a	—N/a	4.5 (Note: Kim Boo-kyum 1.2, Lee Cheol-woo 0.6, Others 2.7)	6.7	25
4–6 Mar 2025	1,003	±3.1	Gallup Korea	35	—N/a	—N/a	6	4	5	—N/a	—N/a	—N/a	10	1	1	—N/a	—N/a	4	34	25
3–5 Mar 2025	1,000	±3.1	NBS	29	2	0	6	8	6	1	—N/a	2	10	—N/a	1	—N/a	—N/a	2 (Note: Kim Boo-kyum 1, Others 1)	34	19
3–4 Mar 2025	1,004	±3.1	Ace Research / Newsis	43.7	1.2	0.8	7.4	5.4	5.0	1.8	1.0	1.6	18.2	—N/a	1.6	1.6	—N/a	5.1 (Note: Na Kyung-won 2.1, Woo Won-shik 1.8, Kim Boo-kyum 0.7, Others 0.5)	5.7	22.3
28 Feb–1 Mar 2025	1,001	±3.1	KSOI / Digital Times	42.0	2.0	1.0	7.8	7.0	6.2	—N/a	—N/a	1.6	19.7	—N/a	1.5	—N/a	—N/a	3.0 (Note: Kim Boo-kyum 0.6, Others 2.4)	8.2	22.3
28 Feb–1 Mar 2025	1,000	±3.1	Flower Research	43.6	1.5	—N/a	6.4	5.1	5.3	—N/a	—N/a	1.3	11.8	—N/a	1.2	—N/a	—N/a	3.5 (Note: Woo Won-shik 2.3, Others 1.2)	20.4	31.8
26–28 Feb 2025	1,000	±3.1	Researchview	42	2	2	7	6	5	1	1	2	22	—N/a	2	2	—N/a	4 (Note: Woo Won-shik 2, Kim Boo-kyum 1, Others 1)	4	20
26–28 Feb 2025	1,506	±2.5	Realmeter / EKN	46.3	1.4	1.3	6.9	5.1	6.8	2.1	—N/a	—N/a	18.9	—N/a	—N/a	1.7	—N/a	3.9 (Note: Kim Boo-kyum 1.3, Others 2.6)	5.5	27.4
25–27 Feb 2025	1,000	±3.1	Gallup Korea	35	—N/a	—N/a	4	3	4	1	—N/a	1	10	—N/a	1	—N/a	—N/a	4	34	25
24–26 Feb 2025	1,001	±3.1	NBS	31	1	0	5	6	6	2	—N/a	2	13	—N/a	1	—N/a	—N/a	2 (Note: Kim Boo-kyum 1, Others 1)	30	18
22–24 Feb 2025	2,004	±2.2	Jowon C&I / Straight News	40.4	1.8	0.9	6.5	8.0	5.6	—N/a	2.4	—N/a	20.4	—N/a	2.6	—N/a	—N/a	3.1 (Note: Woo Won-shik 1.9, Others 1.2)	8.3	20.0
19–20 Feb 2025	1,010	±3.1	Flower Research	43.3	2.2	—N/a	3.3	6.3	6.7	—N/a	—N/a	1.9	12.0	—N/a	0.7	—N/a	—N/a	1.9 (Note: Woo Won-shik 0.7, Others 1.2)	21.7	31.3
18–20 Feb 2025	1,002	±3.1	Gallup Korea	34	—N/a	—N/a	4	4	5	1	—N/a	1	9	2	2	—N/a	—N/a	5	32	25
17–19 Feb 2025	1,000	±3.1	NBS	31	1	1	5	8	5	2	—N/a	2	10	—N/a	2	—N/a	—N/a	3 (Note: Woo Won-shik 1, Kim Boo-kyum 1, Others 1)	31	21
13–14 Feb 2025	1,000	±3.1	Realmeter / EKN	43.3	1.2	1.2	5.7	10.3	7.1	2.5	—N/a	—N/a	18.1	—N/a	—N/a	1.4	—N/a	2.6 (Note: Kim Boo-kyum 1.0, Others 1.6)	6.7	25.2
11–13 Feb 2025	1,004	±3.1	Gallup Korea	34	1	—N/a	5	5	5	—N/a	—N/a	—N/a	12	1	1	—N/a	—N/a	5	30	22.9
8–10 Feb 2025	2,001	±2.2	Jowon C&I / Straight News	41.6	1.4	1.2	6.4	9.6	5.8	—N/a	2.2	—N/a	18.7	—N/a	2.4	—N/a	—N/a	4.1 (Note: Woo Won-shik 2.3, Others 1.8)	6.7	22.9
5–6 Feb 2025	1,001	±3.1	Media Research / Newspim	41.7	2.4	—N/a	5.1	8.9	4.1	—N/a	0.7	1.7	24.2	—N/a	1.6	—N/a	—N/a	5.8 (Note: Woo Won-shik 1.8, Kim Boo-kyum 1.8, Kim Doo-kwan 0.7, Others 1.5)	3.9	17.5
3–5 Feb 2025	1,005	±3.1	NBS	32	2	1	6	8	7	1	—N/a	2	12	—N/a	1	—N/a	—N/a	3 (Note: Kim Boo-kyum 3, Woo Won-shik 2, Others 1)	27	20
1–2 Feb 2025	1,000	±3.1	Ace Research / Newsis	41.4	1.9	0.8	6.7	6.4	6.3	1.5	1.1	1.6	20.3	—N/a	2.6	1.1	—N/a	2.9 (Note: Woo Won-shik 1.3, Kim Boo-kyum 0.5, Others 1.1)	5.5	21.1
31 Jan–1 Feb 2025	1,004	±3.1	Gallup Korea / Segye Ilbo	37	1	—N/a	5	7	4	1	—N/a	1	11	1	1	—N/a	—N/a	4	26	26
31 Jan–1 Feb 2025	1,005	±3.1	KOPRA / Asia Today	38	3	1	8	7	7	—N/a	1	—N/a	19	—N/a	1	2	—N/a	5 (Note: Woo Won-shik 2, Kim Boo-kyum 1, Others 2)	9	19
29–31 Jan 2025	1,000	±3.1	Researchview	45	2	1	6	8	6	2	1	2	20	—N/a	1	1	—N/a	3 (Note: Woo Won-shik 1, Kim Boo-kyum 1, Others 1)	3	25
27–28 Jan 2025	1,004	±3.1	Korea Research / MBC	36	2	1	5	7	6	1	1	2	17	—N/a	1	—N/a	—N/a	3 (Note: Woo Won-shik 2, Kim Boo-kyum 1)	17	19
24–26 Jan 2025	1,000	±3.1	Hankook Research / KBS	35	3	0	7	5	5	1	1	2	14	—N/a	1	—N/a	—N/a	6 (Note: Woo Won-shik 3, Kim Boo-kyum 1, Others 2)	18	21
23–25 Jan 2025	1,004	±3.1	Ipsos / SBS	35	1	1	7	6	8	2	2	3	15	—N/a	2	—N/a	—N/a	4 (Note: Woo Won-shik 2, Kim Boo-kyum 1, Others 1)	16	20
23–24 Jan 2025	1,031	±3.1	Gallup Korea / JoongAngIlbo	36	4	—N/a	8	7	10	—N/a	—N/a	—N/a	16	—N/a	1	—N/a	—N/a	4 (Note: Woo Won-shik 2, Others 2)	14	20
22–23 Jan 2025	1,003	±3.1	Embrain Public / YTN	31	2	0	7	5	9	2	—N/a	2	14	—N/a	2	—N/a	—N/a	6 (Note: Woo Won-shik 3, Kim Boo-kyum 1, Others 2)	20	17
21–23 Jan 2025	1,000	±3.1	Gallup Korea	31	1	—N/a	5	3	4	1	—N/a	1	11	2	1	—N/a	—N/a	5	33	20
20–22 Jan 2025	1,000	±3.1	NBS	28	2	1	6	6	7	2	—N/a	3	14	—N/a	1	—N/a	—N/a	4 (Note: Woo Won-shik 3, Others 1)	27	14
20–21 Jan 2025	1,012	±3.1	Media Research / Newspim	36.4	2.5	—N/a	6.4	6.7	5.7	—N/a	2.0	2.8	24.9	—N/a	1.5	—N/a	—N/a	6.9 (Note: Woo Won-shik 2.3, Kim Boo-kyum 1.5, Kim Doo-kwan 0.4, Others 2.7)	4.2	11.5
18–20 Jan 2025	2,006	±2.2	Jowon C&I / Straight News	37.9	2.6	1.2	7.3	9.1	12.3	—N/a	5.7	2.7	—N/a	—N/a	2.6	—N/a	—N/a	10.2 (Note: Woo Won-shik 3.0, Others 7.2)	8.4	25.6
14–16 Jan 2025	1,001	±3.1	Gallup Korea	31	1	—N/a	6	4	6	—N/a	—N/a	—N/a	7	1	2	—N/a	—N/a	6	36	24
13–15 Jan 2025	1,005	±3.1	NBS	28	3	1	5	6	8	2	—N/a	2	13	—N/a	2	—N/a	—N/a	4 (Note: Woo Won-shik 3, Others 1)	37	15
7–9 Jan 2025	1,004	±3.1	Gallup Korea	32	1	—N/a	6	3	5	—N/a	—N/a	2	8	2	2	—N/a	—N/a	6 (Note: Woo Won-shik 1, Others 5)	33	24
6–8 Jan 2025	1,000	±3.1	NBS	31	2	1	5	7	7	2	—N/a	4	—N/a	—N/a	1	—N/a	—N/a	9 (Note: Woo Won-shik 3, Others 6)	31	24
6–7 Jan 2025	1,000	±3.1	Media Research / Newspim	39.1	3.1	1.6	5.8	9.5	9.3	—N/a	6.2	2.6	—N/a	—N/a	1.5	—N/a	—N/a	14.1 (Note: Woo Won-shik 3.2, Kim Boo-kyum 1.7, Park Yong-jin 0.2, Others 9.0)	7.2	29.6
4–6 Jan 2025	2,003	±2.2	Jowon C&I / Straight News	45.1	2.2	1.2	7.8	6.1	9.7	—N/a	7.2	2.2	—N/a	—N/a	3.1	—N/a	—N/a	8.0 (Note: Woo Won-shik 4.0, Others 4.0)	7.3	35.4
4–5 Jan 2025	1,000	±3.1	KOPRA / Newdaily	40.9	3.0	2.1	8.5	7.3	10.3	2.9	7.9	—N/a	—N/a	—N/a	3.1	—N/a	—N/a	5.6 (Note: Kim Boo-kyum 1.3, Others 4.3)	8.3	30.6
3–4 Jan 2025	1,015	±3.1	Flower Research	42.8	3.0	—N/a	5.4	5.8	8.2	—N/a	—N/a	2.3	—N/a	—N/a	2.1	—N/a	—N/a	3.8	26.7	34.6
29–31 Dec 2024	1,000	±3.1	Researchview	42	2	2	9	7	8	2	—N/a	2	—N/a	—N/a	4	2	—N/a	9 (Note: Woo Won-shik 4, Kim Boo-kyum 1, Others 4)	10	33
29–31 Dec 2024	1,014	±3.1	Next Research / Maeil Business	32	3	1	5	8	8	—N/a	—N/a	3	—N/a	—N/a	3	—N/a	—N/a	9 (Note: Woo Won-shik 5, Kim Boo-kyum 1, Others 3)	28	24
29–31 Dec 2024	1,000	±3.1	Hankook Research / KBS	36	2	1	6	6	8	1	—N/a	2	—N/a	—N/a	2	—N/a	—N/a	9 (Note: Woo Won-shik 5, Kim Boo-kyum 1, Others 3)	27	28
29–30 Dec 2024	1,003	±3.1	Korea Research / MBC	40	2	0	7	5	8	2	3	2	—N/a	—N/a	1	—N/a	—N/a	8 (Note: Woo Won-shik 4, Kim Boo-kyum 1, Others 3)	22	32
29–30 Dec 2024	1,010	±3.1	Ace Research / Newsis	40.1	4.0	1.3	9.0	5.5	6.9	—N/a	3.1	1.6	10.0	—N/a	3.5	1.8	—N/a	7.9 (Note: Woo Won-shik 3.9, Kim Boo-kyum 1.5, Na Kyung-won 1.0, Others 1.5)	5.3	31.1
29–30 Dec 2024	1,006	±3.1	Embrain Public / JoongAngIlbo	35	2	0	6	5	8	2	2	2	5	—N/a	2	1	—N/a	8 (Note: Woo Won-shik 4, Choo Mi-ae 1, Kim Boo-kyum 1, Na Kyung-won 1, Others 1)	22	27
28–29 Dec 2024	1,000	±3.1	Research&Research / Dong-A Ilbo	39.5	4.3	0.8	8.0	8.7	8.9	3.7	—N/a	3.0	—N/a	—N/a	2.3	—N/a	—N/a	8.1 (Note: Woo Won-shik 4.8, Others 3.3)	11.5	30.6
28–29 Dec 2024	1,020	±3.1	Metavoice / Kyunghyang Shinmun	33	2	—N/a	7	5	4	1	—N/a	1	5	2	1	1	2	6 (Note: Woo Won-shik 2, Others 4)	31	26
26–27 Dec 2024	1,000	±3.1	Hankook Research / Korea Times	35	3	—N/a	5	4	7	—N/a	3	3	—N/a	—N/a	2	—N/a	—N/a	10 (Note: Woo Won-shik 4, Others 6)	28	28
27 December 2024	Acting President Han is impeached; Deputy Prime Minister Choi Sang-mok becomes acting president																			
22–23 Dec 2024	1,000	±3.1	Hankook Research / Hankookilbo	38	2	—N/a	7	5	5	—N/a	3	3	—N/a	—N/a	2	—N/a	—N/a	10 (Note: Woo Won-shik 6, Others 4)	24	31
17–19 Dec 2024	1,000	±3.1	Gallup Korea	37	—N/a	—N/a	5	2	5	2	—N/a	1	2	3	2	—N/a	—N/a	6 (Note: Woo Won-shik 1, Others 5)	35	32
14–16 Dec 2024	2,002	±2.2	Jowon C&I / Straight News	48.0	5.7	—N/a	8.0	5.7	7.0	—N/a	4.8	2.8	—N/a	—N/a	4.0	—N/a	—N/a	5.9	8.1	40.0
14 December 2024	President Yoon is impeached; Prime Minister Han Duck-soo becomes acting president																			
9 December 2024	1,001	±3.1	Gongjung / Dailian	49.0	4.4	1.2	9.1	6.0	5.8	—N/a	—N/a	3.3	—N/a	6.8	—N/a	—N/a	—N/a	5.6	8.6	39.9
7–9 Dec 2024	2,002	±2.2	Jowon C&I / Straight News	47.3	4.1	—N/a	12.9	5.3	4.6	—N/a	3.5	2.6	—N/a	6.9	3.3	—N/a	—N/a	2.1	7.3	34.4
8 December 2024	1,000	±3.1	Researchview / KPI News	46.8	4.4	1.4	7.1	5.6	5.8	2.0	—N/a	3.3	—N/a	7.1	3.0	1.7	—N/a	3.2 (Note: Kim Boo-kyum 1.1, Others 2.1)	8.6	39.7
8 December 2024	1,007	±3.1	Media Research / Newspim	52.4	3.9	3.1	9.8	6.7	4.9	—N/a	—N/a	—N/a	—N/a	5.5	—N/a	—N/a	—N/a	6.1	7.7	42.6
6–7 Dec 2024	1,014	±3.1	Gallup Korea / Kukminilbo	41	2	—N/a	9	2	3	—N/a	—N/a	—N/a	2	6	2	—N/a	—N/a	6	29	32
6–7 Dec 2024	1,004	±3.1	Flower Research	42.5	2.1	—N/a	9.9	6.2	6.1	—N/a	—N/a	1.2	—N/a	5.0	0.8	—N/a	—N/a	2.3	24.0	32.6
3–5 Dec 2024	1,001	±3.1	Gallup Korea	29	3	—N/a	11	3	3	—N/a	—N/a	1	2	4	1	—N/a	—N/a	5	37	18
4 December 2024	1,047	±3.0	Media Research / Newspim	47.5	—N/a	—N/a	13.3	4.7	5.6	—N/a	2.7	—N/a	—N/a	6.0	—N/a	3.4	—N/a	6.3	10.3	34.2
4 December 2024	The National Assembly votes to lift martial law																			
3 December 2024	President Yoon Suk Yeol declares martial law																			
29–30 Nov 2024	1,001	±3.1	Flower Research	38.4	2.8	—N/a	13.1	7.1	5.6	—N/a	—N/a	1.6	—N/a	4.4	1.5	—N/a	—N/a	1.2	24.3	25.3
26–27 Nov 2024	1,001	±3.1	KSOI / CBS	41.3	3.4	0.7	19.3	7.0	5.8	—N/a	—N/a	—N/a	—N/a	6.3	—N/a	—N/a	—N/a	7.3 (Note: Rhee Chang-yong 0.6, Others 6.7)	9.0	22.0
23–25 Nov 2024	2,001	±2.2	Jowon C&I / Straight News	43.8	4.8	—N/a	17.2	5.2	5.3	—N/a	4.2	1.2	—N/a	5.8	3.6	—N/a	—N/a	2.0	7.0	26.6
18–19 Nov 2024	1,000	±3.1	Gongjung / Dailian	43.6	3.7	1.4	17.3	7.6	5.3	—N/a	—N/a	2.5	—N/a	6.3	—N/a	—N/a	—N/a	4.6	7.7	26.3
9–11 Nov 2024	2,000	±2.2	Jowon C&I / Straight News	46.9	4.1	—N/a	17.0	4.2	4.7	—N/a	4.0	1.8	—N/a	5.7	3.8	—N/a	—N/a	2.2	5.5	29.9
8–9 Nov 2024	1,005	±3.1	Flower Research	39.3	2.7	—N/a	12.7	5.4	5.4	—N/a	—N/a	2.0	—N/a	6.0	2.3	—N/a	—N/a	2.1	22.1	26.6
5–7 Nov 2024	1,002	±3.1	Gallup Korea	29	2	—N/a	14	3	4	—N/a	—N/a	—N/a	1	5	—N/a	—N/a	—N/a	4	36	15
4–5 Nov 2024	1,000	±3.1	Gongjung / Dailian	41.0	4.2	1.2	16.7	8.5	6.3	—N/a	—N/a	2.2	—N/a	6.6	—N/a	—N/a	—N/a	6.0	7.1	24.3
1–2 Nov 2024	1,002	±3.1	KSOI / Ohmynews	37.3	4.1	1.7	15.3	7.1	5.8	—N/a	—N/a	—N/a	—N/a	8.2	3.9	—N/a	—N/a	7.0	9.7	22.0
26–28 Oct 2024	2,000	±2.2	Jowon C&I / Straight News	45.0	3.2	—N/a	18.6	5.2	4.3	—N/a	3.5	2.1	—N/a	5.6	4.8	—N/a	—N/a	1.5	6.2	26.4
22 October 2024	1,004	±3.1	Gongjung / Dailian	42.6	3.9	1.2	19.2	6.4	4.6	—N/a	—N/a	2.2	—N/a	6.0	—N/a	—N/a	—N/a	5.2	8.7	23.4
12–14 Oct 2024	2,002	±2.2	Jowon C&I / Straight News	43.3	4.1	—N/a	19.7	4.9	4.6	—N/a	3.6	2.1	—N/a	6.5	4.0	—N/a	—N/a	2.7	4.3	23.6
7–8 Oct 2024	1,000	±3.1	Gongjung / Dailian	40.5	2.9	2.0	21.4	6.3	4.1	—N/a	—N/a	1.2	—N/a	7.5	—N/a	—N/a	—N/a	5.9	8.1	19.1
4–5 Oct 2024	1,007	±3.1	Flower Research	35.1	2.0	—N/a	15.4	5.7	5.0	—N/a	—N/a	2.4	—N/a	5.1	2.1	—N/a	—N/a	2.1	24.9	19.7
28–30 Sep 2024	2,001	±2.2	Jowon C&I / Straight News	42.8	3.1	—N/a	20.7	5.0	4.7	—N/a	3.7	1.5	—N/a	6.0	4.4	—N/a	—N/a	2.4	5.3	22.1
28–29 Sep 2024	1,002	±3.1	Ace Research / Newsis	41.2	3.1	1.6	19.3	2.9	3.8	—N/a	1.6	2.1	4.3	7.1	4.5	—N/a	—N/a	0.8 (Note: Kim Boo-kyum 0.8)	7.7	21.9
24–26 Sep 2024	1,001	±3.1	Gallup Korea	25	2	—N/a	15	1	2	—N/a	1	—N/a	2	4	3	—N/a	—N/a	4	40	10
23–24 Sep 2024	1,005	±3.1	Gongjung / Dailian	42.0	2.4	1.0	21.1	6.5	4.6	—N/a	—N/a	2.2	—N/a	7.3	—N/a	—N/a	—N/a	5.7	7.2	20.9
11–12 Sep 2024	1,002	±3.1	Korea Research / MBC	29	2	1	18	5	6	1	1	3	—N/a	5	3	—N/a	—N/a	4 (Note: Kim Boo-kyum 1, Others 2)	22	11
10–12 Sep 2024	2,004	±2.2	Jowon C&I / Straight News	44.5	2.9	—N/a	22.0	4.7	3.2	—N/a	3.6	1.3	—N/a	6.3	4.4	—N/a	—N/a	2.0	5.0	22.5
10 September 2024	1,002	±3.1	Gongjung / Dailian	42.4	2.8	1.3	20.7	7.1	5.0	—N/a	—N/a	2.3	—N/a	6.6	—N/a	—N/a	—N/a	4.4	7.5	21.7
3–5 Sep 2024	1,001	±3.1	Gallup Korea	26	1	—N/a	14	2	1	—N/a	—N/a	1	2	5	3	—N/a	—N/a	3	40	12
31 Aug-2 Sep 2024	2,003	±2.2	Jowon C&I / Straight News	42.1	3.1	—N/a	20.9	3.7	3.3	—N/a	4.1	1.5	—N/a	6.2	5.9	—N/a	—N/a	2.2	7.0	21.2
26–27 Aug 2024	1,002	±3.1	Gongjung / Dailian	40.7	2.5	0.9	24.2	7.3	3.9	—N/a	—N/a	1.6	—N/a	6.0	—N/a	—N/a	—N/a	5.3	7.8	16.5
20–21 Aug 2024	1,004	±3.1	KOPRA / Kihoilbo	39.4	2.5	1.5	25.2	4.7	3.5	—N/a	3.4	—N/a	—N/a	6.3	4.6	—N/a	—N/a	1.0 (Note: Kim Boo-kyum 1.0)	8.0	14.2
17–19 Aug 2024	2,006	±2.2	Jowon C&I / Straight News	43.2	3.0	—N/a	25.6	3.6	3.5	—N/a	3.2	1.6	—N/a	4.7	4.7	—N/a	—N/a	2.3	4.7	17.6
12–13 Aug 2024	1,007	±3.1	Media Tomato / News Tomato	43.9	2.1	1.3	26.1	6.0	3.8	—N/a	—N/a	—N/a	—N/a	6.5	3.3	—N/a	—N/a	3.8	3.1	17.8
12–13 Aug 2024	1,006	±3.1	Gongjung / Dailian	28.5	4.9	5.4	19.8	7.4	6.2	—N/a	—N/a	3.3	—N/a	8.7	—N/a	—N/a	—N/a	8.7	7.1	8.7
9–10 Aug 2024	1,009	±3.1	Flower Research	36.1	1.9	—N/a	17.9	5.2	4.7	—N/a	—N/a	1.7	—N/a	5.1	3.1	—N/a	—N/a	1.1	23.3	18.2
3–5 Aug 2024	2,002	±2.2	Jowon C&I / Straight News	39.0	3.1	—N/a	27.8	3.4	4.1	—N/a	3.9	2.1	—N/a	5.4	5.5	—N/a	—N/a	1.1	4.6	11.2
29–30 Jul 2024	1,009	±3.1	Media Tomato / News Tomato	42.7	—N/a	—N/a	33.4	—N/a	—N/a	—N/a	—N/a	—N/a	—N/a	7.5	4.4	—N/a	—N/a	8.1	3.9	9.3
29–30 Jul 2024	1,005	±3.1	Gongjung / Dailian	37.9	3.1	—N/a	29.5	5.0	4.1	—N/a	—N/a	1.6	—N/a	6.8	3.8	—N/a	—N/a	3.3	4.9	8.4
23–25 Jul 2024	1,001	±3.1	Gallup Korea	22	—N/a	—N/a	19	2	3	—N/a	3	1	—N/a	5	3	—N/a	—N/a	4	38	3
20–22 Jul 2024	4,029	±1.5	Jowon C&I / Straight News	38.5	2.9	—N/a	26.9	5.0	3.2	—N/a	5.8	1.4	—N/a	6.1	5.1	—N/a	—N/a	1.3	3.8	11.6
7–8 Jul 2024	2,003	±2.2	Embrain Public / YTN	27	1	—N/a	17	7	5	1	—N/a	2	—N/a	5	2	1	—N/a	2	28	10
6–8 Jul 2024	2,008	±2.2	Jowon C&I / Straight News	38.2	3.5	—N/a	24.6	3.6	3.9	—N/a	6.9	1.8	—N/a	6.8	4.7	—N/a	—N/a	1.5	4.7	13.6
5–6 Jul 2024	1,002	±3.1	Flower Research	34.3	1.9	—N/a	18.5	5.9	4.5	—N/a	—N/a	1.8	—N/a	5.8	2.2	—N/a	—N/a	2.0	23.1	15.8
2–4 Jul 2024	1,002	±3.1	Gallup Korea	23	—N/a	—N/a	17	3	3	—N/a	2	1	—N/a	5	2	—N/a	—N/a	5	38	6
1–2 Jul 2024	1,002	±3.1	Gongjung / Dailian	35.9	4.5	—N/a	24.6	7.9	5.4	—N/a	—N/a	1.7	—N/a	7.2	4.5	—N/a	—N/a	3.2	5.0	11.3
22–24 Jun 2024	2,006	±2.2	Jowon C&I / Straight News	40.1	3.0	—N/a	21.6	4.2	3.9	—N/a	6.4	1.3	—N/a	7.7	5.3	—N/a	—N/a	1.8	4.5	18.5
17–18 Jun 2024	1,002	±3.1	Gongjung / Dailian	37.8	3.9	—N/a	24.7	5.9	3.7	—N/a	—N/a	2.3	—N/a	7.9	4.8	—N/a	—N/a	3.4	5.5	13.1
14–15 Jun 2024	1,001	±3.1	Gallup Korea / News1	28	—N/a	—N/a	17	1	3	1	1	1	—N/a	7	3	—N/a	—N/a	3	35	11
11–13 Jun 2024	1,000	±3.1	Gallup Korea	22	1	—N/a	15	2	3	—N/a	1	1	—N/a	5	3	—N/a	—N/a	5	42	7
9–10 Jun 2024	2,005	±2.2	Jowon C&I / Straight News	40.7	2.3	—N/a	23.3	4.3	3.7	—N/a	4.5	1.8	—N/a	6.8	5.3	—N/a	—N/a	1.8	5.3	17.4
3–4 Jun 2024	1,004	±3.1	Gongjung / Dailian	35.6	2.8	—N/a	25.9	6.5	4.1	—N/a	—N/a	2.0	—N/a	6.5	5.5	—N/a	—N/a	3.9	7.2	9.7
1–3 Jun 2024	2,005	±2.2	Jowon C&I / Straight News	41.0	2.1	—N/a	22.0	4.0	4.4	—N/a	5.0	1.8	—N/a	8.0	5.4	—N/a	—N/a	1.7	4.6	19.0
28–30 May 2024	1,000	±3.1	Research View / PSPD	38	3	2	24	4	4	2	—N/a	1	—N/a	8	3	2	—N/a	4 (Note: Choo Mi-ae 2, Others 2)	5	14
25–27 May 2024	2,004	±2.2	Jowon C&I / Straight News	39.6	2.5	—N/a	22.8	3.9	4.4	—N/a	4.6	1.8	—N/a	7.5	6.3	—N/a	—N/a	1.5	5.1	16.8
20–21 May 2024	1,000	±3.1	Gongjung / Dailian	36.8	2.4	—N/a	24.5	5.5	5.2	—N/a	—N/a	2.3	—N/a	7.4	5.2	—N/a	—N/a	6.5	4.3	12.3
11–13 May 2024	2,002	±2.2	Jowon C&I / Straight News	38.6	2.6	—N/a	25.1	3.9	4.2	—N/a	4.6	1.6	—N/a	7.7	4.1	—N/a	—N/a	1.4	6.1	13.5
7–9 May 2024	1,000	±3.1	Gallup Korea	23	—N/a	—N/a	17	2	3	—N/a	—N/a	2	—N/a	7	3	—N/a	—N/a	6	38	7
6–7 May 2024	1,003	±3.1	Gongjung / Dailian	37.3	3.5	—N/a	26.0	5.3	4.7	—N/a	—N/a	2.1	—N/a	7.7	4.2	—N/a	—N/a	3.1	5.9	11.3
27–29 Apr 2024	2,006	±2.2	Jowon C&I / Straight News	39.3	3.7	—N/a	21.9	4.5	4.7	—N/a	5.0	1.6	—N/a	8.1	5.7	—N/a	—N/a	1.8	4.2	17.4
16–18 Apr 2024	1,000	±3.1	Gallup Korea	24	—N/a	—N/a	15	1	3	—N/a	2	1	—N/a	7	3	—N/a	—N/a	5	39	9
13–15 Apr 2024	2,013	±2.2	Jowon C&I / Straight News	37.8	—N/a	—N/a	23.9	—N/a	—N/a	—N/a	—N/a	4.4	—N/a	10.1	5.7	—N/a	—N/a	11.1 (Note: Na Kyung-won 3.7, Others 7.4)	7.1	13.9
10 April 2024	2024 South Korean legislative election is held																			
2–3 Apr 2024	1,002	±3.1	Korea Research / MBC	27	1	—N/a	23	3	4	2	5	2	—N/a	5	2	2	—N/a	1 (Note: Kim Boo-kyum 1)	24	4
28–29 Mar 2024	1,004	±3.1	Research&Research / Dong-a Ilbo	31.5	4.3	—N/a	21.8	5.9	6.7	—N/a	4.1	1.5	—N/a	6.2	—N/a	3.9	—N/a	2.7	11.3	9.7
28–29 Mar 2024	1,011	±3.1	Gallup Korea / Seoul Economic Daily	27	—N/a	—N/a	20	1	2	—N/a	1	—N/a	—N/a	4	1	2	—N/a	3	38	7
26–27 Mar 2024	1,001	±3.1	Korea Research / MBC	32	2	—N/a	24	3	4	2	2	2	—N/a	5	1	3	—N/a	1 (Note: Kim Boo-kyum 1)	19	8
5–7 Mar 2024	1,000	±3.1	Gallup Korea	23	1	—N/a	24	2	2	—N/a	1	—N/a	—N/a	3	2	2	—N/a	5 (Note: Lee Tahney 1, Others 4)	35	1
20 February 2024	1,012	±3.1	Media Research / Newspim	35.8	3.6	—N/a	35.3	4.2	4.1	—N/a	—N/a	—N/a	—N/a	—N/a	3.4	4.1	—N/a	3.8	5.6	0.5
13–14 Feb 2024	1,004	±3.1	Ace Research / Newsis	37	5	—N/a	34	3	4	—N/a	3	2	—N/a	—N/a	4	4	—N/a	1	3	3
6–7 Feb 2024	1,001	±3.1	Korea Research / MBC	26	4	—N/a	23	5	5	3	3	2	—N/a	—N/a	3	3	—N/a	1 (Note: Kim Boo-kyum 1)	21	3
3–4 Feb 2024	1,000	±3.1	Metrix / Yonhapnews	28	3	—N/a	25	3	5	—N/a	—N/a	2	—N/a	—N/a	3	4	—N/a	4 (Note: Kim Boo-kyum 1, Sim Sang-jung 1, Others 2)	24	3
30 Jan–1 Feb 2024	1,000	±3.1	Gallup Korea	26	1	—N/a	23	2	2	—N/a	—N/a	—N/a	—N/a	—N/a	4	4	—N/a	4	35	3
9–11 Jan 2024	1,002	±3.1	Gallup Korea	23	1	—N/a	22	1	3	—N/a	—N/a	1	—N/a	—N/a	3	3	—N/a	5	38	1
8–9 Jan 2024	1,002	±3.1	Gongjung / Dailian	35.8	5.1	—N/a	32.7	4.0	—N/a	—N/a	1.8	1.9	—N/a	—N/a	—N/a	5.1	—N/a	1.7 (Note: Sim Sang-jung 1.7)	11.9	3.2
6–7 Jan 2024	1,000	±3.1	Metrix / Yonhapnews	25	3	—N/a	24	3	6	—N/a	—N/a	3	—N/a	—N/a	4	4	—N/a	5 (Note: Sim Sang-jung 2, Kim Boo-kyum 1, Others 2)	24	1
1–2 Jan 2024	1,002	±3.1	Ace Research / Newsis	39	4	—N/a	35	4	3	—N/a	2	1	—N/a	—N/a	—N/a	4	—N/a	4 (Note: Park Yong-jin 1, Others 3)	5	4
30–31 Dec 2023	1,018	±3.1	KStat Research / TV Chosun	27	4	—N/a	21	5	7	—N/a	3	2	—N/a	—N/a	—N/a	5	—N/a	3 (Note: Kim Boo-kyum 1, Others 2)	24	6
29–30 Dec 2023	1,005	±3.1	Korea Research / MBC	27	3	—N/a	22	4	7	2	3	3	—N/a	—N/a	3	5	—N/a	1 (Note: Kim Boo-kyum 1)	21	5
28–29 Dec 2023	1,017	±3.1	Gallup Korea / JoongAngIlbo	22	1	—N/a	24	1	2	1	1	1	—N/a	—N/a	3	2	—N/a	5 (Note: Lee Tahney 1, Others 4)	36	2
26–27 Dec 2023	1,000	±3.1	Hankook Research / HankookIlbo	23	3	—N/a	21	5	6	3	3	2	—N/a	2	2	4	—N/a	3 (Note: Sim Sang-jung 2, Others 1)	26	2
25–26 Dec 2023	1,015	±3.1	Gongjung / Dailian	35.6	4.7	—N/a	27.2	6.3	—N/a	—N/a	5.9	2.3	—N/a	—N/a	—N/a	4.8	—N/a	1.4 (Note: Sim Sang-jung 1.4)	11.8	8.4
23–24 Dec 2023	1,024	±3.1	Rnsearch / Asia Today	36.9	2.5	—N/a	35.8	2.8	3.3	—N/a	1.4	—N/a	—N/a	—N/a	4.2	4.3	—N/a	1.8	6.9	1.1
5–7 Dec 2023	1,000	±3.1	Gallup Korea	19	2	—N/a	16	2	4	1	2	—N/a	—N/a	—N/a	2	3	—N/a	5	43	3
7–9 Nov 2023	1,001	±3.1	Gallup Korea	21	2	—N/a	13	4	4	—N/a	1	2	—N/a	—N/a	3	2	—N/a	4	44	8
10–12 Oct 2023	1,002	±3.1	Gallup Korea	22	1	—N/a	14	4	3	—N/a	1	2	—N/a	—N/a	1	1	—N/a	6 (Note: Lee Tahney 1, Others 5)	46	8
5–7 Sep 2023	1,000	±3.1	Gallup Korea	19	2	—N/a	12	2	3	1	2	2	—N/a	—N/a	1	3	—N/a	5 (Note: Lee Tahney 1, Others 4)	48	7
30 May–1 Jun 2023	1,002	±3.1	Gallup Korea	22	1	—N/a	11	4	5	1	—N/a	2	—N/a	—N/a	1	2	—N/a	5 (Note: Lee Tahney 1, Others 4)	46	11
11–13 Mar 2023	1,020	±3.1	Kookmin Research Group, Ace Research / Newsis	37.3	—N/a	—N/a	16.4	7.1	7.2	3.5	5.6	4.2	—N/a	—N/a	—N/a	4.1	—N/a	5.7 (Note: Kim Boo-kyum 1.6, Others 4.1)	9.0	20.9
28 Feb–2 Mar 2023	1,001	±3.1	Gallup Korea	20	—N/a	—N/a	11	3	5	1	2	4	—N/a	—N/a	2	3	—N/a	5	44	9
26–27 Jan 2023	1,006	±3.1	Gallup Korea / Segye Ilbo	24.6	—N/a	—N/a	11.1	2.7	4.9	3.8	—N/a	6.9	—N/a	—N/a	1.4	2.1	—N/a	4.8	37.7	13.5
1–2 Jan 2023	1,020	±3.1	Rnsearch / Mewspim	33.7	1.5	—N/a	18.1	9.0	8.3	5.4	—N/a	3.8	—N/a	—N/a	—N/a	6.4	—N/a	2.6	11.2	15.6
26–27 Dec 2022	1,015	±3.1	Global Research / The Hankyoreh	24.4	2.4	0.6	9.9	8.2	11.9	4.5	—N/a	5.6	—N/a	—N/a	2.1	4.1	—N/a	3.9 (Note: Sim Sang-jung 2.2, Im Jong-seok 0.5, Others 1.2)	22.5	12.5
16–17 Dec 2022	1,016	±3.1	Flower Research	31.4	2.4	—N/a	10.2	9.1	—N/a	—N/a	3.5	4.5	—N/a	—N/a	—N/a	5.1	—N/a	6.1 (Note: Sim Sang-jung 2.0, Others 4.1)	27.9	21.2
4–6 Dec 2022	1,030	±3.1	Ace Research / Newsis	37.3	—N/a	—N/a	18.6	7.9	7.4	8.0	3.3	4.1	—N/a	—N/a	—N/a	5.2	—N/a	1.0	7.3	18.7
4–5 Dec 2022	1,024	±3.1	Rnsearch / Mewspim	37.8	2.3	—N/a	18.9	7.1	9.3	4.4	—N/a	3.1	—N/a	—N/a	—N/a	5.8	—N/a	1.6	9.7	18.9
3–5 Dec 2022	1,002	±3.1	Jowon C&I / Straight News	37.0	3.3	—N/a	19.1	9.8	8.2	—N/a	—N/a	3.9	—N/a	—N/a	—N/a	6.9	—N/a	5.5 (Note: Park Yong-jin 1.0, Others 4.5)	6.1	17.9
29 Nov –1 Dec 2022	1,000	±3.1	Gallup Korea	23	—N/a	—N/a	10	2	4	2	—N/a	3	—N/a	—N/a	2	3	—N/a	6	44	13
5–7 Nov 2022	1,023	±3.1	Rnsearch / Mewspim	38.3	2.4	—N/a	18.0	10.8	8.6	4.1	—N/a	3.6	—N/a	—N/a	—N/a	5.0	—N/a	1.6 (Note: Park Yong-jin 0.3, Others 1.3)	7.6	20.3
8–10 Oct 2022	1,021	±3.1	Rnsearch / Mewspim	41.1	3.2	—N/a	17.1	10.8	7.3	—N/a	—N/a	4.1	—N/a	—N/a	—N/a	6.0	—N/a	3.3	7.0	24.0
10–12 Sep 2022	1,014	±3.1	Rnsearch / Mewspim	40.1	2.9	—N/a	18.5	11.7	8.0	—N/a	—N/a	4.3	—N/a	—N/a	—N/a	4.5	—N/a	3.0	7.1	21.6
30 Aug–1 Sep 2022	1,000	±3.1	Gallup Korea	27	—N/a	—N/a	9	4	4	2	—N/a	4	—N/a	—N/a	3	2	—N/a	4	41	18
6–8 Aug 2022	1,025	±3.1	Rnsearch / Mewspim	39.6	3.4	—N/a	12.8	13.3	8.3	—N/a	—N/a	3.8	—N/a	—N/a	—N/a	8.2	—N/a	3.0	7.6	26.3
9–12 Jul 2022	1,045	±3.0	Rnsearch / Mewspim	38.5	4.7	—N/a	12.4	15.1	6.3	—N/a	—N/a	5.6	—N/a	—N/a	—N/a	5.5	—N/a	3.0	8.8	23.4
11–13 Jun 2022	1,025	±3.1	Rnsearch / Mewspim	29.3	5.6	—N/a	9.4	23.9	—N/a	—N/a	3.5	6.9	—N/a	—N/a	—N/a	5.0	—N/a	4.4	6.2	5.4
7–9 Jun 2022	1,000	±3.1	Gallup Korea	15	4	—N/a	4	10	5	—N/a	—N/a	6	—N/a	—N/a	1	3	—N/a	4	46	5
29–31 Mar 2022	1,000	±3.1	ResearchView	28	2	—N/a	—N/a	13	7	4	10	10	—N/a	—N/a	5	7	—N/a	7 (Note: Kim Boo-kyum 2, Song Young-gil 2, Park Yong-jin 1, Others 2)	5	15
9 March 2022	2022 election			47.8	—N/a	—N/a	—N/a	—N/a	—N/a	—N/a	—N/a	—N/a	—N/a	—N/a	—N/a	—N/a	—N/a	3.6 (Note: Sim Sang-jung 2.4, Others 1.2)	0.9	0.7

=== Hypothetical polling ===
==== Lee Jae-myung vs. Han Dong-hoon ====
Fieldwork date	Sample size	Margin of error	Polling firm	Lee Jae-myung	Han Dong-hoon	Lead
30 Apr–1 May 2025	2,002	±2.2	Flower Research	50.4	24.0	26.4
26 Apr 2025	1,012	±3.1	Research&Research / Channel A	52.9	25.7	27.2
23–24 Apr 2025	1,004	±3.1	Gallup Korea / Kukmin Daily	52	36	16
23 Apr 2025	2,090	±2.1	Embrain Public / Munhwa Ilbo	47	24	23
11–12 Apr 2025	1,003	±3.1	Korea Research / MBC	49	27	22
10–11 Apr 2025	1,020	±3.1	Gallup Korea / Segye Ilbo	48	34	14
9–11 Apr 2025	1,506	±2.5	Realmeter / EKN	54.0	18.3	35.7
8–10 Apr 2025	3,000	±1.8	Hankook Research / KBS	47	24	23
8–9 Apr 2025	1,212	±2.8	Ace Research / Newsis	53.4	27.5	25.9
8–9 Apr 2025	1,004	±3.1	Gallup Korea / JoongAngIlbo	52	32	20
6–7 Apr 2025	1,008	±3.1	Gallup Korea / News1	52	31	21
4–5 Apr 2025	1,008	±3.1	Hangil Research / MBN	50.3	18.2	32.1
4–5 Apr 2025	1,012	±3.1	Gallup Korea / Sedaily	52	32	20
26–28 Mar 2025	1,510	±2.5	Realmeter / EKN	54.3	17.2	37.1
12–14 Mar 2025	1,510	±2.5	Realmeter / EKN	51.8	18.6	33.2
26–28 Feb 2025	1,506	±2.5	Realmeter / EKN	49.7	20.3	29.4
26–27 Feb 2025	1,004	±3.1	Flower Research	46.7	17.4	29.3
23–24 Feb 2025	1,000	±3.1	Researchview / KPI News	51.4	21.7	29.7
16–17 Feb 2025	1,000	±3.1	Researchview / KPI News	50.8	23.8	27.0
9–10 Feb 2025	1,000	±3.1	Researchview / KPI News	48.6	24.2	24.4
8–10 Feb 2025	2,001	±2.2	Jowon C&I / Straight News	45.3	19.0	26.3
3–4 Feb 2025	1,007	±3.1	Gongjung / Dailian	45.8	24.1	21.7
2–3 Feb 2025	1,000	±3.1	Researchview / KPI News	51.6	24.2	27.4
31 Jan–1 Feb 2025	1,004	±3.1	Gallup Korea / Segye Ilbo	47	34	13
24–26 Jan 2025	1,000	±3.1	Hankook Research / KBS	46	28	18
24–25 Jan 2025	2,001	±2.2	KOPRA / Asia Today	45	34	11
23–25 Jan 2025	1,004	±3.1	Ipsos / SBS	41	22	19
22–23 Jan 2025	1,003	±3.1	Embrain Public / YTN	39	33	6
29–31 Dec 2024	1,014	±3.1	Next Research / Maeil Business	46	23	23
22 October 2024	1,004	±3.1	Gongjung / Dailian	53.6	30.2	23.4
7–8 Oct 2024	1,000	±3.1	Gongjung / Dailian	50.5	32.5	18.0
23–24 Sep 2024	1,005	±3.1	Gongjung / Dailian	51.9	32.8	19.1
23–24 Aug 2024	1,010	±3.1	Flower Research	45.6	28.0	17.6
19–20 Aug 2024	1,008	±3.1	Media Tomato / News Tomato	54.6	36.0	18.6
17–19 Aug 2024	1,025	±3.1	Hangil Research / Kukinews	50.7	30.4	20.3
30–31 Mar 2024	1,000	±3.1	Metrix / Yonhapnews	37	31	6
18–19 Mar 2024	1,001	±3.1	Gongjung / Dailian	45.3	37.6	7.7
4–5 Mar 2024	1,000	±3.1	Gongjung / Dailian	42.3	43.2	0.9
2–3 Mar 2024	1,000	±3.1	Metrix / Yonhapnews	30	33	3
22–23 Feb 2024	1,015	±3.1	Gallup Korea / Sedaily	43	46	3
19–20 Feb 2024	1,001	±3.1	Gongjung / Dailian	40.4	46.6	6.2
5–6 Feb 2024	1,001	±3.1	Gongjung / Dailian	42.1	47.8	5.7
3–4 Feb 2024	1,000	±3.1	Metrix / Yonhapnews	36	36	Tie
25–26 Jan 2024	1,011	±3.1	Gallup Korea / Sedaily	45	42	3
22–23 Jan 2024	1,004	±3.1	Gongjung / Dailian	45.9	42.8	3.1
8–9 Jan 2024	1,002	±3.1	Gongjung / Dailian	45.5	43.1	2.4
6–7 Jan 2024	1,000	±3.1	Metrix / Yonhapnews	36	36	Tie
30–31 Dec 2023	1,018	±3.1	KStat Research / TV Chosun	38	38	Tie
20–21 Dec 2023	1,006	±3.1	KOPRA	41	45	4

==== Lee Jae-myung vs. Kim Moon-soo ====
Fieldwork date	Sample size	Margin of error	Polling firm	Lee Jae-myung	Kim Moon-soo	Lead
12–13 May 2025	1,002	±3.1	Gallup Korea	55	39	16
6–7 May 2025	1,000	±3.1	Ace Research / Newsis	54.9	37.0	17.9
3–6 May 2025	15,001	±0.8	Flower Research	54.2	23.8	30.4
4 May 2025	1,006	±3.1	Korea Research / MBC	54.3	33.5	20.8
30 Apr–1 May 2025	2,002	±2.2	Flower Research	51.2	27.5	23.7
26 Apr 2025	1,012	±3.1	Research&Research / Channel A	52.6	29.4	23.2
23–24 Apr 2025	1,004	±3.1	Gallup Korea / Kukmin Daily	56	35	21
23 Apr 2025	2,090	±2.1	Embrain Public / Munhwa Ilbo	49	27	22
15–16 Apr 2025	1,001	±3.1	KIR / Cheonjiilbo	49.8	26.4	23.4
11–12 Apr 2025	1,003	±3.1	Korea Research / MBC	50	32	18
10–11 Apr 2025	1,020	±3.1	Gallup Korea / Segye Ilbo	50	38	12
9–11 Apr 2025	1,506	±2.5	Realmeter / EKN	54.3	25.3	29.0
8–10 Apr 2025	3,000	±1.8	Hankook Research / KBS	48	31	17
8–9 Apr 2025	1,212	±2.8	Ace Research / Newsis	52.0	36.8	15.2
8–9 Apr 2025	1,004	±3.1	Gallup Korea / JoongAngIlbo	53	35	18
6–7 Apr 2025	1,008	±3.1	Gallup Korea / News1	55	35	20
4–5 Apr 2025	1,008	±3.1	Hangil Research / MBN	51.1	28.8	22.3
4–5 Apr 2025	1,012	±3.1	Gallup Korea / Sedaily	53	35	18
26–28 Mar 2025	1,510	±2.5	Realmeter / EKN	54.1	28.5	25.6
19–20 Mar 2025	1,003	±3.1	WinG Korea / Voice of Seoul	49.8	40.4	9.4
12–14 Mar 2025	1,510	±2.5	Realmeter / EKN	51.7	30.7	21.0
12 March 2025	1,000	±3.1	WinG Korea / Voice of Seoul	48.7	42.7	6.0
8–10 Mar 2025	1,022	±3.1	Hangil Research / Kukinews	47.2	34.0	13.2
26–28 Feb 2025	1,506	±2.5	Realmeter / EKN	50.0	31.6	18.4
26–27 Feb 2025	1,004	±3.1	Flower Research	46.6	22.5	24.1
23–24 Feb 2025	1,000	±3.1	Researchview / KPI News	52.6	35.5	17.1
16–17 Feb 2025	1,000	±3.1	Researchview / KPI News	50.8	36.6	14.2
13–14 Feb 2025	1,000	±3.1	Realmeter / EKN	46.3	31.8	14.5
12 February 2025	1,023	±3.1	WinG Korea / Voice of Seoul	45.8	46.9	1.1
9–10 Feb 2025	1,000	±3.1	Researchview / KPI News	50.0	37.8	12.2
8–10 Feb 2025	2,001	±2.2	Jowon C&I / Straight News	46.1	34.2	11.9
5 February 2025	1,017	±3.1	WinG Korea / Voice of Seoul	46.4	45.3	1.1
3–4 Feb 2025	1,007	±3.1	Gongjung / Dailian	46.6	38.1	8.5
2–3 Feb 2025	1,000	±3.1	Researchview / KPI News	53.1	34.7	18.4
31 Jan–1 Feb 2025	1,004	±3.1	Gallup Korea / Segye Ilbo	50	37	13
24–26 Jan 2025	1,000	±3.1	Hankook Research / KBS	47	35	12
24–25 Jan 2025	2,001	±2.2	KOPRA / Asia Today	46	45	1
23–25 Jan 2025	1,004	±3.1	Ipsos / SBS	42	28	14
22–23 Jan 2025	1,003	±3.1	Embrain Public / YTN	42	38	4
15–16 Jan 2025	1,039	±3.0	WinG Korea / Voice of Seoul	45.4	43.5	1.9

==== Lee Jae-myung vs. Hong Joon-pyo ====
Fieldwork date	Sample size	Margin of error	Polling firm	Lee Jae-myung	Hong Joon-pyo	Lead
26 Apr 2025	1,012	±3.1	Research&Research / Channel A	51.1	31.9	19.2
23–24 Apr 2025	1,004	±3.1	Gallup Korea / Kukmin Daily	52	38	14
23 Apr 2025	2,090	±2.1	Embrain Public / Munhwa Ilbo	46	29	15
15–16 Apr 2025	1,001	±3.1	KIR / Cheonjiilbo	51.6	26.3	25.3
11–12 Apr 2025	1,003	±3.1	Korea Research / MBC	49	31	18
10–11 Apr 2025	1,020	±3.1	Gallup Korea / Segye Ilbo	48	38	10
9–11 Apr 2025	1,506	±2.5	Realmeter / EKN	54.4	22.5	31.9
8–10 Apr 2025	3,000	±1.8	Hankook Research / KBS	47	31	16
8–9 Apr 2025	1,212	±2.8	Ace Research / Newsis	52.2	34.0	18.2
8–9 Apr 2025	1,004	±3.1	Gallup Korea / JoongAngIlbo	50	38	12
6–7 Apr 2025	1,008	±3.1	Gallup Korea / News1	52	36	16
4–5 Apr 2025	1,008	±3.1	Hangil Research / MBN	50.9	26.0	24.9
4–5 Apr 2025	1,012	±3.1	Gallup Korea / Sedaily	52	38	14
26–28 Mar 2025	1,510	±2.5	Realmeter / EKN	54.0	23.5	30.5
12–14 Mar 2025	1,510	±2.5	Realmeter / EKN	52.3	25.0	27.3
8–10 Mar 2025	1,022	±3.1	Hangil Research / Kukinews	46.8	24.9	21.9
26–28 Feb 2025	1,506	±2.5	Realmeter / EKN	50.0	24.2	25.8
26–27 Feb 2025	1,004	±3.1	Flower Research	47.6	23.5	24.1
23–24 Feb 2025	1,000	±3.1	Researchview / KPI News	51.2	29.6	21.6
16–17 Feb 2025	1,000	±3.1	Researchview / KPI News	50.5	29.0	21.5
13–14 Feb 2025	1,000	±3.1	Realmeter / EKN	46.9	26.2	20.7
9–10 Feb 2025	1,000	±3.1	Researchview / KPI News	49.4	33.9	15.5
8–10 Feb 2025	2,001	±2.2	Jowon C&I / Straight News	45.6	25.5	20.1
3–4 Feb 2025	1,007	±3.1	Gongjung / Dailian	47.0	31.0	16.0
2–3 Feb 2025	1,000	±3.1	Researchview / KPI News	53.4	30.6	22.8
31 Jan–1 Feb 2025	1,004	±3.1	Gallup Korea / Segye Ilbo	47	39	8
24–26 Jan 2025	1,000	±3.1	Hankook Research / KBS	46	36	10
24–25 Jan 2025	2,001	±2.2	KOPRA / Asia Today	46	42	4
23–25 Jan 2025	1,004	±3.1	Ipsos / SBS	41	27	14
22–23 Jan 2025	1,003	±3.1	Embrain Public / YTN	41	41	Tie
29–31 Dec 2024	1,014	±3.1	Next Research / Maeil Business	47	28	19
28–29 Dec 2024	1,000	±3.1	EveryResearch / Newsspirit	49.6	23.5	26.1

==== Lee Jae-myung vs. Oh Se-hoon ====
Fieldwork date	Sample size	Margin of error	Polling firm	Lee Jae-myung	Oh Se-hoon	Lead
11–12 Apr 2025	1,003	±3.1	Korea Research / MBC	50	30	20
10–11 Apr 2025	1,020	±3.1	Gallup Korea / Segye Ilbo	47	40	7
9–11 Apr 2025	1,506	±2.5	Realmeter / EKN	54.0	19.5	34.5
8–10 Apr 2025	3,000	±1.8	Hankook Research / KBS	47	29	18
8–9 Apr 2025	1,212	±2.8	Ace Research / Newsis	53.5	31.9	21.6
8–9 Apr 2025	1,004	±3.1	Gallup Korea / JoongAngIlbo	51	38	13
6–7 Apr 2025	1,008	±3.1	Gallup Korea / News1	52	37	15
4–5 Apr 2025	1,008	±3.1	Hangil Research / MBN	50.6	22.7	27.9
4–5 Apr 2025	1,012	±3.1	Gallup Korea / Sedaily	51	37	14
26–28 Mar 2025	1,510	±2.5	Realmeter / EKN	54.5	23.0	31.5
12–14 Mar 2025	1,510	±2.5	Realmeter / EKN	51.8	25.6	26.2
8–10 Mar 2025	1,022	±3.1	Hangil Research / Kukinews	47.9	23.8	24.1
26–28 Feb 2025	1,506	±2.5	Realmeter / EKN	50.3	23.5	26.8
26–27 Feb 2025	1,004	±3.1	Flower Research	46.8	24.0	22.8
23–24 Feb 2025	1,000	±3.1	Researchview / KPI News	52.5	29.7	22.8
16–17 Feb 2025	1,000	±3.1	Researchview / KPI News	51.3	31.7	19.6
13–14 Feb 2025	1,000	±3.1	Realmeter / EKN	46.6	29.0	17.6
9–10 Feb 2025	1,000	±3.1	Researchview / KPI News	49.7	34.9	14.8
8–10 Feb 2025	2,001	±2.2	Jowon C&I / Straight News	45.0	27.6	17.4
3–4 Feb 2025	1,007	±3.1	Gongjung / Dailian	46.9	32.1	14.8
2–3 Feb 2025	1,000	±3.1	Researchview / KPI News	53.2	31.8	21.4
31 Jan–1 Feb 2025	1,004	±3.1	Gallup Korea / Segye Ilbo	47	43	4
24–26 Jan 2025	1,000	±3.1	Hankook Research / KBS	45	36	9
24–25 Jan 2025	2,001	±2.2	KOPRA / Asia Today	46	43	3
23–25 Jan 2025	1,004	±3.1	Ipsos / SBS	42	26	16
22–23 Jan 2025	1,003	±3.1	Embrain Public / YTN	41	41	Tie
29–31 Dec 2024	1,014	±3.1	Next Research / Maeil Business	44	30	14
28–29 Dec 2024	1,000	±3.1	EveryResearch / Newsspirit	50.2	26.7	23.5

==== Lee Jae-myung vs. Han Duck-soo ====
Fieldwork date	Sample size	Margin of error	Polling firm	Lee Jae-myung	Han Duck-soo	Lead
6–7 May 2025	1,000	±3.1	Ace Research / Newsis	56.1	36.2	19.9
3–6 May 2025	15,001	±0.8	Flower Research	54.4	30.8	23.6
4 May 2025	1,006	±3.1	Korea Research / MBC	54.5	36.3	18.2
30 Apr–1 May 2025	2,002	±2.2	Flower Research	51.3	32.2	19.1
26 Apr 2025	1,012	±3.1	Research&Research / Channel A	52.8	32.7	20.1
23–24 Apr 2025	1,004	±3.1	Gallup Korea / Kukmin Daily	53	38	15
23 Apr 2025	2,090	±2.1	Embrain Public / Munhwa Ilbo	47	30	17
15–16 Apr 2025	1,001	±3.1	KIR / Cheonjiilbo	52.4	30.0	22.4
16 Apr 2025	1,001	±3.1	WinG Korea / Voice of Seoul	54.1	37.7	16.4
9–11 Apr 2025	1,506	±2.5	Realmeter / EKN	54.2	27.6	26.6

==== Lee Jae-myung vs. Lee Jun-seok ====
Fieldwork date	Sample size	Margin of error	Polling firm	Lee Jae-myung	Lee Jun-seok	Lead
12–13 May 2025	1,002	±3.1	Gallup Korea	54	32	22

== See also ==
- Opinion polling on the Yoon Suk Yeol presidency
