= Lee Tahney =

South Korean politician (born 1978)

- 이탄희
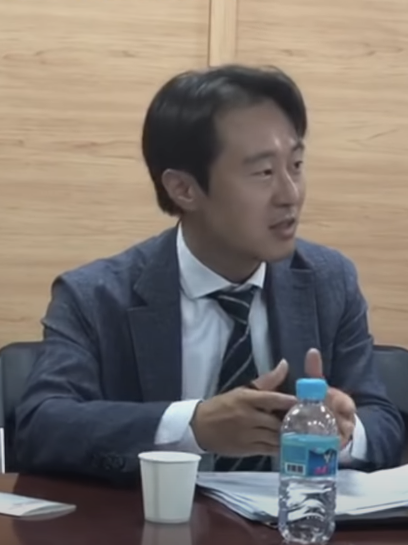
- Lee Tahney

Member of the National Assembly
- Incumbent
- Assumed office 30 May 2020
- Preceded by: Pyo Chang-won
- Constituency: Yongin 4th

Personal details
- Born: 3 November 1978 (age 47) Seoul, South Korea
- Party: Democratic
- Spouse: Oh Ji-won
- Education: Harvard University
- Occupation: Judge, lawyer, politician
- Religion: Roman Catholic (Christian name : Paul)

Lee Tahney (Korean: 이탄희, born 3 November 1978) is a South Korean lawyer, judge and politician. A member of the liberal Democratic Party, he was elected the Member of the National Assembly for Yongin 4th constituency in 2020 election. Prior to entering politics, he was the judge in various local and high courts.

== Early life and education ==
Lee was born in Seoul in 1978. He attended Garak High School and obtained a bachelor's degree in law at Seoul National University. He earned Master of Laws degree at Harvard University in the United States.

== Legal career ==
After qualifying for the bar in 2002, Lee graduated from the Judicial Research and Training Institute in 2005. He was firstly appointed a judge at Suwon District Court in 2008 and worked for 2 years. Then, he moved to Seoul Central District Court (2010–2012), Gwangju District Court (2012–2014) and Jeju District Court (2015–2016). He returned to Suwon District Court in 2016. He was briefly a barrister at the Korean Public Interest Lawyers Group from 2019 to 2020, till he joined the politics.

In 2017, Lee was appointed the Deputy Director-General of the National Court Administration. Shortly after this, he had found out some documents, such as the Judiciary Blacklist and the Dissolution Plan of the Institute of International Human Rights Law; both are related to the former Chief Justice of the Supreme Court Yang Sung-tae. He then submitted a resignation letter in order to protest against the judicial scandal, although the letter was rejected. However, this incident has contributed for the judicial reform, including the detention of the ex-Chief Justice.

== Political career ==
On 19 January 2020, Lee was brought to the ruling Democratic Party. A month later, he was nominated for Yongin 4th constituency, where the incumbent was Pyo Chang-won of the same party. In the election on 15 April, he received 53.46% and defeated the United Future candidate Kim Bum-soo.

== Election results ==
=== General elections ===
Year	Constituency	Political party	Votes (%)	Remarks
2020	Yongin 4th	Democratic Party of Korea	79,794 (53.46%)	Won
