= GongGam Human Rights Law Foundation =

Non-governmental organization

- 공익인권법재단 공감
- Purpose: Pro Bono Legal Services
- Headquarters: Jongro-gu, Seoul, Korea
- Website: http://kpil.org/
- Formerly called: GongGam, Korean Public Interest Lawyers' Group (KPIL)

GongGam (Korean: 공감; Hanja: 共感; Vietnamese: Cộng Cảm; lit. 'Empathy'), also known as the GongGam Human Rights Law Foundation, is a non-governmental organization that provides legal services for marginalized communities in South Korea. It is the first of its kind. It was founded in 2004 as an offshoot of the Beautiful Foundation. Since then GongGam has grown from four to nine lawyers who work in the newly developing area of public interest law. GongGam is financed by mostly grassroots donations.

== Activities ==
GongGam provides legal support and advice to other non-governmental and nonprofit organization on issues relating to the protection of human rights and the elimination of discrimination. The organization also provides legal education to NGOs and other public interest groups. GongGam advises and provides representation in various litigations relating to social inequalities. GongGam develops programs for public interest lawyering and coordinates pro bono activities.

== Impact on Korean society ==
=== Women rights ===
2016: GongGam conducted a research on situation of migrant women's work environment in agriculture and the sexual violence against them. It later organized development conferences and legal action.

2015: GongGam represented four Filipino women who came to Korea on an entertainment (E-6-2) visa but ended up being sexually exploited in a foreigners-only club.

=== Migrants and refugees ===
GongGam successfully represented a young Vietnamese woman who was tricked into marrying a Korean man.

=== Disability rights ===
2016: GongGam participated in the public hearing about Article 24 of the Mental Health Act in the Constitutional Court before the Constitutional Court decided that Article 24 was unconstitutional in 2016.

=== Precarious workers ===
2016:

2014: GongGam represented the family of an apartment security guard who committed suicide following repeated maltreatment by some of the residents.
