= Opinion polling for the 2022 South Korean presidential election =

This article is a list of opinion polls that have been taken for the 2022 South Korean presidential election. It is divided into polls for intended candidates, and then for the presidential election itself. Two-way polls are used to demonstrate the popularity of one candidate with respect to another, but the election itself will have no run-off round and will be held under a system of first-past-the-post. The polls are ordered by date, with the newest at the top.

== Opinion polling ==
=== Polling after nominees confirmed ===
==== Graphical summary ====
Local regression of polls conducted

==== Polling average ====
Polling Average
Aggregation Firm	Fieldwork date	Updated date	Lee Jae-myung	Yoon Suk Yeol	Sim Sang-jung	Ahn Cheol-soo	Kim Dong-yeon	Huh Kyung-young	Others/ Undecided	Lead
Opinion M (Final)	7 Jan 2021 – 2 Mar 2022	5 Mar 2022	41.2%	43.6%	2.6%	7.2%	(N/A)	(N/A)	5.4%	2.4%
Election20 (Final)	6 Nov 2021 – 2 Mar 2022	5 Mar 2022	40.5%	43.6%	2.1%	7.2%	(N/A)	(N/A)	6.6%	3.1%
pol MetriX (Final)	4 Jan 2021 – 4 Mar 2021 (Reported Date)	5 Mar 2022	40.9%	44.3%	2.1%	7.3%	(N/A)	(N/A)	5.4%	3.4%
SBS Meta S X Poliscore (Final)	(N/A)	4 Mar 2022	40.2%	41.8%	1.8%	7.9%	(N/A)	(N/A)	8.3%	1.6%
Electoral Analysis (Final)	1 – 2 Mar 2022	3 Mar 2022	43.3%	45.9%	4.4%	(N/A)	(N/A)	(N/A)	6.4%	2.6%
Asia Elects	(N/A)	26 Feb 2022	39.0%	40.2%	2.8%	8.5%	(N/A)	(N/A)	9.5%	1.2%

==== 2022 ====
===== Official campaign =====
This table below lists polls completed since the publication of the official list of candidates on 15 February until the vote on 9 March 2022. The publication of polls are prohibited from 3 March 2022.

Polling firm / Client		Fieldwork date	Sample size	Margin of error							Others/ Undecided	Lead
Polling firm / Client		Fieldwork date	Sample size	Margin of error	Lee Democratic	Yoon People Power	Sim Justice	Ahn People (Note: Withdrew his candidacy on 3 March 2022.)	Kim New Wave (Note: Withdrew his candidacy on 2 March 2022.)	Huh NRDP	Others/ Undecided	Lead
		9 Mar	Turnout: 77.1%		47.83%	48.56%	2.37%			0.83%	0.41%	0.73%
3 March 2022		Ahn Cheol-soo withdrew from the presidential campaign, endorsing Yoon Seok-youl.										
KIR	NewsPim	2 Mar	1002	±3.1%p	43.4%	47.2%	1.3%	5.3%		1.2%	1.6%	3.8%
Southern Post	CBS	2 Mar	1001	±3.1%p	37.7%	39.6%	1.7%	8.6%		—N/a	12.4%	1.9%
R&R	The Dong-a Ilbo	1–2 Mar	1008	±3.1%p	39.4%	42.1%	3.2%	8.2%		—N/a	7.1%	2.7%
Embrain Public	Munhwa Ilbo	1–2 Mar	1002	±3.1%p	41.9%	43.7%	2.2%	6.0%		—N/a	6.2%	1.8%
Ipsos	Korea Economic Daily	1–2 Mar	1000	±3.1%p	40.7%	44.3%	1.3%	7.9%	0.3%	2.0%	3.4% (Note: Progressive Party, Kim Jae-yeon, 0.5%. Our Republican Party, Cho Won-jin, 0.1%. Saenuri Party, Ok Eun-ho, 0.1%. New Liberal Democratic Union, Kim Gyeong-jae, 0.1%.)	3.6%
KSOI	Herald Economy	1–2 Mar	1006	±3.1%p	43.7%	44.4%	1.9%	7.2%		—N/a	2.8%	0.7%
Opinion Research Justice	Dailian	1–2 Mar	3004	±1.8%p	40.7%	46.4%	1.8%	6.1%	1.1%	—N/a	3.9%	5.7%
Ipsos; Korea Research; Hankook Research	KBS, MBC, SBS	1–2 Mar	2003	±2.2%p	37.1%	42.1%	1.4%	6.0%	0.1%	1.5%	6.9% (Note: Our Republican Party, Cho Won-jin, 0.2%. Progressive Party, Kim Jae-yeon, 0.2%. Labor Party, Lee Baek-yoon, 0.1%.)	5.0%
Kantar Korea	TV Chosun	1–2 Mar	1009	±3.1%p	33.8%	40.1%	2.2%	7.2%		—N/a	16.7%	6.3%
Opinion Research Justice	JKN	1–2 Mar	1008	±3.1%p	42.7%	45.1%	1.0%	5.5%	0.9%	1.8%	3.1%	2.4%
WinG Korea	Asia Business	1–2 Mar	1015	±3.1%p	45.4%	45.2%	1.3%	5.9%		—N/a	2.2%	0.2%
Gallup Korea	Money Today	1–2 Mar	1005	±3.1%p	39.2%	40.6%	2.1%	9.0%		—N/a	9.0%	1.4%
Next Research	MBN	1–2 Mar	1011	±3.1%p	34.1%	39.9%	2.1%	10.3%		—N/a	13.6%	5.8%
PNR	News Prime et al.	1–2 Mar	1011	±3.1%p	41.9%	47.5%	1.3%	4.9%		2.6%	1.8%	5.6%
		1–2 Mar	1000	±3.1%p	41%	47%	2%	7%		—N/a	3%	6%
Hangil Research	Kuki News	1–2 Mar	1021	±3.1%p	40.9%	43.6%	2.3%	6.1%		—N/a	4.3%	2.7%
Gallup Korea		28 Feb – 2 Mar	1002	±3.1%p	38%	39%	3%	12%		—N/a	8%	1%
National Barometer Survey		28 Feb – 2 Mar	2013	±2.2%p	40%	40%	2%	9%		—N/a	10%	Tie
RealMeter	Oh My News	28 Feb – 2 Mar	3037	±1.8%p	40.6%	45.1%	1.9%	7.1%		—N/a	5.2%	4.5%
Embrain Public	JoongAng Ilbo	28 Feb – 2 Mar	2013	±2.2%p	40.4%	43.7%	1.8%	8.1%		—N/a	3.6%	3.3%
2 March 2022		Kim Dong-yeon withdrew from the presidential campaign, endorsing Lee Jae-myung.										
KSOI	Kukmin Ilbo	28 Feb – 1 Mar	1012	±3.1%p	37.9%	44.2%	2.1%	8.9%	—N/a	—N/a	6.9%	6.3%
Jowon C&I	Ilyo Shinmun	28 Feb – 1 Mar	1013	±3.1%p	42.1%	44.9%	2.6%	7.0%	0.5%	—N/a	2.9%	2.8%
Global Research	JTBC	28 Feb – 1 Mar	1006	±3.1%p	36.6%	42.3%	2.9%	6.7%	—N/a	—N/a	11.5%	5.7%
Media Research	OBS	28 Feb – 1 Mar	1000	±3.1%p	45.0%	44.9%	1.5%	5.1%	—N/a	1.5%	2.0%	0.1%
RealMeter	Newsis	28 Feb – 1 Mar	1007	±3.1%p	43.1%	46.3%	1.9%	6.7%	—N/a	—N/a	2.1%	3.2%
Kantar Korea	Seoul Economic Daily	27 Feb – 1 Mar	1028	±3.1%p	34.1%	44.1%	2.0%	7.8%	—N/a	—N/a	12.0%	10.0%
Jowon C&I	Local Press Korea Assoc.	26 Feb – 1 Mar	3004	±1.8%p	42.4%	45.3%	1.7%	7.3%	—N/a	—N/a	3.3%	2.1%
PNR	New Daily	26 Feb – 1 Mar	4014	±1.5%p	42.5%	46.5%	2.1%	6.4%	—N/a	—N/a	2.4%	4.0%
ARC	Freedom Daily	28 Feb	1002	±3.1%p	43.2%	46.5%	2.1%	4.5%	0.7%	1.4%	1.5% (Note: Korean Unification Party, Lee Gyeong-hee, 0.3%.)	3.3%
Ace Research	Kookje Daily	27–28 Feb	1002	±3.1%p	43.7%	44.6%	1.9%	7.4%	—N/a	—N/a	2.4%	0.9%
Real Research Korea	Kmaeil	25–28 Feb	1000	±3.1%p	41.5%	46.8%	2.8%	6.2%	—N/a	—N/a	2.7%	5.3%
Mediatomato	Newstomato	26–27 Feb	1452	±2.6%p	42.0%	44.2%	2.1%	8.5%	—N/a	—N/a	3.2%	2.2%
Opinion Research Justice	Dailian	25–27 Feb	3004	±1.8%p	42.3%	45.4%	2.1%	5.5%	0.8%	—N/a	3.9%	3.1%
RealMeter	The Fact	26–27 Feb	1009	±3.1%p	41.0%	46.1%	2.5%	7.9%	—N/a	—N/a	2.5%	5.1%
RealMeter	Oh My News	24–27 Feb	2052	±2.2%p	39.5%	42.0%	1.8%	8.6%	—N/a	—N/a	8.2%	2.5%
KSOI	TBS	25–26 Feb	1000 (Note: Conducted with ARS Method.)	±3.1%p	43.2%	45.0%	1.5%	5.9%	0.6%	1.7%	2.2%	1.8%
KSOI	TBS	25–26 Feb	1005 (Note: Conducted with Interview Method.)	±3.1%p	43.8%	36.1%	3.4%	7.3%	0.4%	1.9%	7.2%	7.7%
Southern Post	CBS	26 Feb	1021	±3.1%p	40.0%	40.4%	2.7%	8.1%	—N/a	—N/a	8.8%	0.4%
Gallup Korea	The Seoul Shinmun	25–26 Feb	1004	±3.1%p	37.2%	42.3%	3.5%	11.0%	—N/a	—N/a	6.0%	5.1%
Embrain Public	News1	25–26 Feb	1014	±3.1%p	40.2%	42.4%	2.8%	9.0%	—N/a	—N/a	5.6%	2.2%
Hankook Research	KBS	24–26 Feb	2000	±2.2%p	39.8%	39.8%	3.1%	8.2%	—N/a	—N/a	9.1%	Tie
Kantar Korea	TV Chosun	23–24 Feb	1007	±3.1%p	34.9%	36.5%	3.1%	8.5%	—N/a	—N/a	17.0%	1.6%
PNR	News Prime et al.	23–24 Feb	1005	±3.1%p	41.0%	43.8%	3.1%	7.4%	—N/a	1.9%	2.4%	2.8%
		22–24 Feb	1000	±3.1%p	41%	46%	2%	7%	—N/a	—N/a	4%	5%
Gallup Korea		22–24 Feb	1000	±3.1%p	38%	37%	4%	12%	—N/a	—N/a	9%	1%
KIR	Cheonji Daily	23 Feb	1001	±3.1%p	39.3%	45.8%	3.2%	6.9%	—N/a	1.2%	3.7%	6.5%
Media Research	OBS	22-23 Feb	1000	±3.1%p	42.2%	43.2%	2.4%	6.2%	—N/a	2.9%	3.1%	1.0%
KRi	MBC	22-23 Feb	1005	±3.1%p	39.6%	41.9%	2.5%	7.8%	0.1%	1.1%	7.0% (Note: New Liberal Democratic Union, Kim Gyeong-jae, 0.1%.)	2.3%
Embrain Public	JoongAng Ilbo	22-23 Feb	1005	±3.1%p	39.4%	40.2%	3.3%	9.4%	—N/a	—N/a	7.7%	0.8%
National Barometer Survey		21-23 Feb	1004	±3.1%p	37%	39%	3%	9%	—N/a	—N/a	12%	2%
RealMeter	Oh My News	20-23 Feb	2038	±2.2%p	40.5%	41.9%	2.6%	6.8%	—N/a	—N/a	8.2%	1.4%
Jowon C&I	Sisa Journal	20-22 Feb	1002	±3.1%p	42.3%	44.2%	2.8%	6.7%	—N/a	—N/a	4.1%	1.9%
KIR	NewsPim	21 Feb	1002	±3.1%p	39.5%	44.0%	3.1%	7.5%	0.5%	2.0%	3.4%	4.5%
Gallup Korea	Money Today	20-21 Feb	1002	±3.1%p	38.3%	39.0%	3.0%	9.5%	—N/a	—N/a	10.2%	0.7%
Hangil Research	Polinews	19-21 Feb	1027	±3.1%p	42.6%	42.7%	1.2%	6.5%	0.3%	1.6%	5.1% (Note: Our Republican Party, Cho Won-jin, 0.3%.)	0.1%
Opinion Research Justice	Dailian	20 Feb	1001	±3.1%p	40.8%	45.3%	1.9%	6.0%	1.0%	—N/a	5.0%	4.5%
Jowon C&I	Straight News	19-20 Feb	1002	±3.1%p	42.1%	43.6%	2.2%	5.9%	0.9%	—N/a	5.4%	1.5%
Mediatomato	Newstomato	19-20 Feb	1061	±3.0%p	41.9%	44.4%	2.9%	6.2%	—N/a	—N/a	4.7%	2.5%
Global Research	JTBC	19-20 Feb	1006	±3.1%p	34.1%	42.4%	3.2%	6.6%	—N/a	—N/a	13.7%	8.3%
Real Research Korea	Kmaeil	18-20 Feb	1001	±3.1%p	40.6%	43.4%	4.0%	6.9%	—N/a	—N/a	5.1%	2.8%
Jowon C&I	CBS	18-19 Feb	1001	±3.1%p	39.9%	44.7%	2.7%	7.5%	—N/a	1.7%	3.5%	4.8%
KSOI	TBS	18-19 Feb	1002	±3.1%p	43.7%	42.2%	2.7%	5.8%	0.4%	1.7%	3.3%	1.5%
R&R	The Dong-a Ilbo	18-19 Feb	1006	±3.1%p	36.4%	43.3%	2.7%	9.9%	—N/a	—N/a	7.7%	6.9%
Hankook Research	Hankookilbo	18-19 Feb	1012	±3.1%p	36.9%	42.4%	2.3%	7.1%	—N/a	—N/a	11.3%	5.5%
Kantar Korea	Seoul Economic Daily	18-19 Feb	1012	±3.1%p	32.2%	41.3%	3.3%	6.9%	—N/a	—N/a	14.8%	9.1%
PNR	New Daily	18-19 Feb	2015	±2.2%p	39.8%	47.6%	2.2%	7.0%	—N/a	—N/a	3.3%	7.8%
Southern Post	CBS	18-19 Feb	1001	±3.1%p	31.4%	40.2%	4.4%	8.2%	—N/a	—N/a	15.8%	8.8%
RealMeter	Oh My News	13-18 Feb	3043	±1.8%p	38.7%	42.9%	3.2%	8.3%	—N/a	—N/a	6.8%	4.2%
Inner Tech Systems	GNN	18 Feb	1014	±3.1%p	39.7%	46.1%	4.2%	5.7%	—N/a	—N/a	4.4%	6.4%
PNR	News Prime et al.	16-17 Feb	1004	±3.1%p	39.9%	44.6%	1.9%	7.9%	—N/a	1.5%	4.2%	4.7%
Gallup Korea		15-17 Feb	1007	±3.1%p	34%	41%	4%	11%	—N/a	—N/a	10%	7%
		15-17 Feb	1000	±3.1%p	39%	48%	3%	7%	—N/a	—N/a	3%	9%
Ipsos; Korea Research; Hankook Research	KBS, MBC, SBS	15-16 Feb	2006	±2.2%p	35.2%	39.2%	3.7%	8.1%	0.1%	1.7%	12% (Note: Our Republican Party, Cho Won-jin, 0.1%.)	4.0%
Media Research	OBS	15-16 Feb	1000	±3.1%p	40.4%	43.6%	3.0%	5.9%	—N/a	2.7%	4.4%	3.2%
		14-16 Feb	1006	±3.1%p	39.0%	45.3%	3.7%	8.2%	—N/a	—N/a	3.8%	6.3%
National Barometer Survey		14-16 Feb	1012	±3.1%p	31%	40%	2%	8%	—N/a	—N/a	19%	9%
For more information, visit the National Election Survey Deliberation Committee

===== 1 February to 14 February =====
Polling firm / Client		Fieldwork date	Sample size	Margin of error	Lee Jae-myung	Yoon Suk Yeol	Sim Sang-jung	Ahn Cheol-soo	Kim Dong-yeon	Huh Kyung-young	Others/ Undecided	Lead
Hangil Research	Kuki News	12–14 Feb	1009	±3.1%p	41.9%	42.4%	2.0%	7.2%	—N/a	—N/a	6.6%	0.5%
ARC	Freedom Daily	13 Feb	1001	±3.1%p	36.9%	48.7%	2.0%	7.2%	—N/a	2.3%	2.8%	11.8%
Mediatomato	Newstomato	12–13 Feb	1046	±3.0%p	40.2%	43.2%	3.0%	8.3%	—N/a	—N/a	1.9%	3.0%
Kantar Korea	TV Chosun	12–13 Feb	1010	±3.1%p	33.2%	38.8%	3.1%	8.4%	—N/a	—N/a	16.5%	5.6%
KIR	NewsPim	12 Feb	1,006	±3.1%p	39.4%	44.3%	3.9%	6.1%	0.7%	2.9%	2.7%	4.9%
Southern Post	CBS	12 Feb	1015	±3.1%p	35.0%	35.5%	3.0%	7.2%	—N/a	—N/a	19.3%	0.5%
Opinion Research Justice	Dailian	11–12 Feb	1000	±3.1%p	38.2%	46.6%	1.7%	6.9%	0.9%	—N/a	5.7%	8.4%
Opinion Research Justice	JKN	11–12 Feb	1000	±3.1%p	36.6%	47.5%	1.8%	7.7%	0.5%	1.8%	4.2%	10.9%
KSOI	TBS	11–12 Feb	1005	±3.1%p	40.4%	43.5%	3.5%	7.8%	0.6%	1.2%	3.1%	3.1%
PNR	New Daily	11–12 Feb	2028	±2.2%p	40.3%	46.6%	2.5%	7.3%	—N/a	—N/a	3.3%	6.3%
RealMeter	Oh My News	6–11 Feb	3040	±1.8%p	39.1%	41.6%	2.8%	7.7%	—N/a	—N/a	8.8%	2.5%
PNR	News Prime et al.	9–10 Feb	1018	±3.1%p	38.0%	44.9%	2.8%	8.7%	—N/a	2.6%	2.9%	6.9%
		9–10 Feb	1000	±3.1%p	36%	48%	3%	8%	1%	—N/a	4%	12%
Gallup Korea		8–10 Feb	1001	±3.1%p	36%	37%	3%	13%	—N/a	—N/a	11%	1%
Opinion Research Justice	Freedom Daily	9 Feb	1004	±3.1%p	40.1%	44.6%	1.8%	8.3%	0.5%	—N/a	4.8% (Note: Our Republican Party, Cho Won-jin, 0.8% National Revolutionary Party, Ko Young-Il, 0.3%.)	4.5%
Media Research	OBS	8–9 Feb	1000	±3.1%p	39.0%	44.3%	2.8%	6.7%	—N/a	3.0%	4.2%	5.3%
Kantar Korea	Seoul Economic Daily	8–9 Feb	1008	±3.1%p	31.3%	41.2%	3.9%	8.9%	—N/a	—N/a	12.6%	9.9%
Hankook Research	KBS	7–9 Feb	1000	±3.1%p	34.0%	37.7%	3.0%	9.0%	—N/a	—N/a	16.2%	3.7%
National Barometer Survey		7–9 Feb	1007	±3.1%p	35%	35%	4%	9%	—N/a	—N/a	16%	Tie
Next Research	MBN	7–8 Feb	1001	±3.1%p	31.6%	36.1%	3%	10%	—N/a	—N/a	19.2%	4.5%
Gallup Korea	Money Today	7–8 Feb	1007	±3.1%p	36.9%	40.1%	3.9%	10%	—N/a	—N/a	9.1%	3.2%
Jowon C&I	Sisa Journal	6–8 Feb	2020	±2.2%p	38.5%	44.8%	2.5%	8.8%	—N/a	—N/a	5.3%	6.5%
Jowon C&I	Straight News	5–6 Feb	1003	±3.1%p	39.0%	45.5%	2.7%	9.0%	0.5%	—N/a	3.3%	6.5%
KRi	MBC	5–6 Feb	1012	±3.1%p	35.3%	37.1%	3.5%	11.9%	—N/a	—N/a	12.3%	1.8%
Mediatomato	News Tomato	5–6 Feb	1017	±3.1%p	36.8%	44.9%	3%	8.6%	0.7%	2%	3.5%	8.1%
KIR	NewsPim	5 Feb	1006	±3.1%p	35.6%	46.5%	2.6%	7.9%	1.1%	2.5%	3.2%	10.9%
Embrain Public	JoongAng Ilbo	4–5 Feb	1005	±3.1%p	38.1%	36.2%	4.2%	11.7%	—N/a	—N/a	9.4%	1.9%
Opinion Research Justice	Dailian	4–5 Feb	1000	±3.1%p	36.3%	44.6%	3.2%	7.4%	0.7%	—N/a	7.8%	8.3%
PNR	New Daily	4–5 Feb	2001	±2.2%p	37.7%	48%	3%	7.7%	—N/a	—N/a	3.7%	10.3%
KSOI	Kukmin Ilbo	3–4 Feb	1006	±3.1%p	35.1%	37.2%	2.2%	8.4%	—N/a	—N/a	17.1%	2.1%
Realmeter	OhmyNews	2–4 Feb	1509	±2.5%p	38.1%	43.4%	2.5%	7.5%	—N/a	—N/a	8.4%	5.3%
PNR	News Prime et al.	2–3 Feb	2001	±2.2%p	38%	44.3%	2.9%	7.4%	—N/a	3%	4.3%	6.3%
Hangil Research	Kuki news	2 Feb	1012	±3.1%p	40.4%	38.5%	3.3%	8.2%	0.5%	2.1%	6.9%	1.9%
Research View	UPI News	1–3 Feb	1000	±3.1%p	38%	46%	3%	8%	1%	—N/a	3%	8%
For more information, visit the National Election Survey Deliberation Committee

===== January =====
Polling firm / Client		Fieldwork date	Sample size	Margin of error	Lee Jae-myung	Yoon Suk Yeol	Sim Sang-jung	Ahn Cheol-soo	Kim Dong-yeon	Huh Kyung-young	Others/ Undecided	Lead
Opinion Research Justice	Dailian	29 Jan	1002	±3.1%p	38.1%	43.5%	2.8%	7.8%	0.8%	—N/a	7.1%	5.4%
PNR	New Daily	28–29 Jan	2001	±2.2%p	39.7%	45.1%	2.6%	8.3%	—N/a	—N/a	4.4%	5.4%
Korea Research	MBC	26–27 Jan	1002	±3.1%p	32.9%	41.1%	3.1%	10.5%	—N/a	—N/a	11.9%	8.2%
KIR	NewsPim	26 Jan	1,005	±3.1%p	35.6%	42.4%	3.1%	8.8%	0.9%	5.6%	3.7%	6.8%
Embrain Public	Munhwa Ilbo	24–25 Jan	1,001	±3.1%p	33.5%	35.9%	3.2%	12%	0.7%	—N/a	14.7%	2.4%
RealMeter	Oh My News	17–21 Jan	3,031	±1.8%p	36.8%	42.0%	2.5%	10.0%	—N/a	—N/a	8.7%	5.2%
Gallup Korea		18–20 Jan	1,002	±3.1%p	34%	33%	3%	17%	—N/a	—N/a	13%	1%
Global Research	JTBC	16–17 Jan	1,020	±3.1%p	34.6%	32.9%	3.3%	14%	—N/a	—N/a	15.2%	1.7%
PNR	New Daily	14–15 Jan	1,000	±3.1%p	33.8%	44.8%	3.0%	11.7%	—N/a	—N/a	6.7%	11.0%
RealMeter	Oh My News	9–14 Jan	3,031	±1.8%p	36.7%	40.6%	2.0%	12.9%	—N/a	—N/a	7.8%	3.9%
Gallup Korea		11–13 Jan	1,001	±3.1%p	37%	31%	3%	17%	—N/a	—N/a	12%	6%
KSOI	TBS	7–8 Jan	1,000	±3.1%p	37.6%	35.2%	2.3%	15.1%	0.4%	—N/a	9.4%	2.4%
KRI	MBC	7–8 Jan	1,003	±3.1%p	37.1%	30.5%	4.0%	13.6%	—N/a	—N/a	14.8%	6.6%
PNR	New Daily	7–8 Jan	1,001	±3.1%p	38.5%	37.7%	2.9%	13.4%	—N/a	—N/a	7.5%	0.8%
Southern Post	CBS	7–8 Jan	1,002	±3.1%p	34.1%	26.4%	3.1%	12.8%	—N/a	—N/a	23.6%	7.7%
RealMeter	Oh My News	2–7 Jan	3,042	±1.8%p	40.1%	34.1%	2.8%	11.1%	—N/a	—N/a	11.9%	6.0%
Gallup Korea		6 Jan	1,002	±3.1%p	36.0%	26.0%	5.0%	15.0%	—N/a	—N/a	18.0%	10.0%
Global Research	JTBC	5–6 Jan	1,006	±3.1%p	38.0%	25.1%	3.0%	12.0%	—N/a	—N/a	21.9%	12.9%
Gallup Korea	Money Today	5 Jan	1,001	±3.1%p	37.6%	29.2%	3.6%	12.9%	0.2%	—N/a	16.5%	8.4%
GGilbo	NBS	5 Jan	1,000	±3.1%p	36.0%	28.0%	2.0%	12.0%	—N/a	—N/a	22.0%	8.0%
	UPI news	4–6 Jan	1,000	±3.1%p	41%	38%	3%	13%	—N/a	—N/a	6%	3%
R&S Research	MBN	4–5 Jan	1,003	±3.1%p	38.5%	34.2%	3.3%	12.2%	—N/a	—N/a	11.8%	4.3%
Media Research	OBS	4–5 Jan	1,001	±3.1%p	40.3%	37.0%	3.6%	9.2%	—N/a	2.8%	7.1%	3.3%
Korea Research	KBS	3–4 Jan	1,000	±3.1%p	39.1%	26.0%	3.1%	10.6%	0.6%	—N/a	21.6%	13.1%
KIR	Cheonji Daily	2 Jan	1,003	±3.1%p	37.7%	37.1%	3.9%	10.6%	1.2%	—N/a	10.5%	0.6%
Global Research	JTBC	1–2 Jan	1,012	±3.1%p	37.0%	28.1%	3.2%	9.1%	—N/a	—N/a	22.6%	8.9%
R&R	Choson	1 Jan	1,013	±3.1%p	35.5%	30.9%	4.1%	10.3%	—N/a	—N/a	14.4%	4.6%
KSOI	TBS	31 Dec – 1 Jan	1,000	±3.1%p	41.0%	37.1%	2.2%	9.2%	1.1%	—N/a	9.4%	3.9%
Opinion Research Justice	Dailian	31 Dec – 1 Jan	1,000	±3.1%p	39.9%	36.8%	2.3%	8.0%	0.7%	—N/a	12.3%	1.6%
Ace Research	Mudeung Daily	31 Dec – 1 Jan	1,000	±3.1%p	44.1%	35.6%	3.8%	7.7%	0.5%	—N/a	8.3%	8.5%
PNR	New Daily	31 Dec – 1 Jan	1,002	±3.1%p	40.5%	40.9%	1.8%	8.5%	—N/a	—N/a	8.3%	0.4%
R&R	The Dong-a Ilbo	30 Dec – 1 Jan	1,012	±3.1%p	39.9%	30.2%	4.3%	8.6%	0.6%	—N/a	16.4%	9.7%
For more information, visit the National Election Survey Deliberation Committee

==== 2021 ====
Polling firm / Client		Fieldwork date	Sample size	Margin of error	Lee Jae-myung	Yoon Suk Yeol	Sim Sang-jung	Ahn Cheol-soo	Kim Dong-yeon	Huh Kyung-young	Others/ Undecided	Lead
NR	SBS	30–31 Dec	1,003	±3.1%p	34.9%	26.0%	2.6%	7.8%	—N/a	—N/a	28.7%	8.9%
KRI	MBC	29–31 Dec	1,007	±3.1%p	38.5%	28.4%	4.0%	8.4%	—N/a	—N/a	20.7%	10.1%
Korea research	KBS	29–31 Dec	1,000	±3.1%p	39.3%	27.3%	3.2%	8.1%	0.5%	—N/a	21.6%	12.0%
Hankook Research	Hankookilbo	29–30 Dec	1,005	±3.1%p	34.3%	28.7%	4.5%	9.0%	—N/a	—N/a	23.5%	5.6%
ARC	Sportsseoul	29 Dec	1,001	±3.1%p	41.5%	38.8%	2.0%	6.7%	—N/a	3.9%	7.0%	2.7%
R&R	The Segye Times	27–29 Dec	1,013	±3.1%p	35.5%	30.9%	4.1%	10.3%	—N/a	—N/a	19.2%	4.6%
Gallup Korea	The Seoul Shinmun	27–28 Dec	1,008	±3.1%p	36.8%	30.8%	6.6%	9.3%	—N/a	—N/a	10.3%	6.0%
KSOI	Harold Economy	27–28 Dec	1,002	±3.1%p	42.9%	37.8%	3.3%	4.4%	—N/a	—N/a	11.5%	5.1%
Mediatomato	Newstomato	25–26 Dec	1,014	±3.1%p	40.1%	33.9%	4.5%	6.6%	1.2%	—N/a	13.8%	6.2%
Opinion Research Justice	Dailian	24–25 Dec	1,000	±3.1%p	39.1%	37.5%	2.1%	6.5%	1.2%	—N/a	13.5%	1.6%
PNR	New Daily	24–25 Dec	1,000	±3.1%p	40.4%	41.1%	2.8%	5.7%	—N/a	—N/a	10.1%	0.7%
KSOI	TBS	24–25 Dec	1,000	±3.1%p	37.6%	35.8%	3.5%	7.3%	1.5%	—N/a	14.3%	1.8%
SP	Chosun	24–25 Dec	1,010	±3.1%p	36.6%	27.7%	3.9%	4.1%	—N/a	—N/a	24.7%	8.9%
Media research	Obsnews	23–24 Dec	1,006	±3.1%p	42.8%	35.5%	3.3%	5.7%	—N/a	4.0%	8.7%	7.3%
KED	Chosun	23–24 Dec	1,004	±3.1%p	37.8%	37.5%	5.1%	8.4%	1.0%	—N/a	10.2%	0.3%
Realmeter	YTN	20–21 Dec	1,027	±3.1%p	37.0%	40.1%	3.6%	4.2%	1.7%	—N/a	13.4%	3.1%
KSOI	Hani	20 Dec	1,008	±3.1%p	40.3%	37.4%	4.2%	4.6%	1.3%	—N/a	12.1%	2.9%
Realmeter	Ohmynews	19–24 Dec	3,090	±1.8%p	39.7%	40.4%	2.9%	5.6%	—N/a	—N/a	11.4%	0.7%
NewsSCJ	KIR	14 Dec	1,022	±3.1%p	35.2%	44.9%	4.4%	3.9%	1.2%	4.5%	5.9%	9.7%
IMNews	MBC	14 Dec	1,007	±3.1%p	34.5%	38.7%	4.5%	5.9%	—N/a	—N/a	16.4%	4.2%
Realmeter	The Watch	7–8 Dec	1,028	±3.1%p	35.5%	37.4%	6.7%	4.1%	1.9%	4.6%	6.2% (Note: Independent, Son Hak-gyu 1.3%. Progressive Party, Kim Jae-yeon 0.9%. Our Republican Party, Cho Won-jin, 0.7% National Revolutionary Party, Kim Gyeong-jae, 0.4%.)	1.9%
Gallup Korea	MoneyToday	6–7 Dec	1,006	±3.1%p	35.5%	36.4%	3.5%	6.5%	1.0%	—N/a	16.4%	0.1%
PNR	New Daily	3–4 Dec	1,004	±3.1%p	38.5%	42.6%	3.8%	2.9%	0.8%	4.4%	6.9%	4.1%
KSOI	TBS	2–3 Dec	1,007	±3.1%p	37.9%	41.2%	4.1%	3.2%	1.7%	—N/a	12.0%	4.3%
R&R	ChannelA	1 Dec	1,008	±3.1%p	35.5%	34.6%	4.9%	6.0%	1.6%	—N/a	17.4%	0.9%
RealMeter	Hani	29 Nov	1,000	±3.1%p	35.1%	43.7%	3.0%	4.3%	1.1%	—N/a	12.6%	8.6%
PNR	Khan	23–24 Nov	1,011	±3.1%p	37.1%	43.9%	3.8%	3.8%	0.4%	—N/a	5.7% (Note: Progressive Party, Kim Jae-yeon 0.3%. Our Republican Party, Cho Won-jin, 1.4%)	6.8%
KSOI	Hani	24 Nov	1,000	±3.1%p	39.5%	40.0%	4.5%	4.0%	1.1%	—N/a	10.8%	0.5%
GET	R&Search	23 Nov	1,008	±3.1%p	36.1%	44.5%	3.5%	3.5%	0.5%	3.1%	8.8%	8.4%
Gallup Korea	Money Today	22–23 Nov	1,011	±3.1%p	37.1%	38.4%	3.0%	5.5%	1.0%	—N/a	15.0%	1.3%
PNR	New Daily	19–20 Nov	1,007	±3.1%p	36.7%	46.5%	3.0%	2.6%	1.0%	—N/a	10.1%	9.8%
Gallup Korea	Chosun Ilbo	16–18 Nov	1,000	±3.1%p	31.0%	42.0%	5.0%	7.0%	—N/a	—N/a	15.0%	11.0%
ARC	ARC	10–11 Nov	1,006	±3.1%p	34.6%	47.4%	2.1%	3.7%	—N/a	2.9%	9.5%	12.8%
Realmeter	JoongBoo Daily	9–10 Nov	810	±3.4%p	35.4%	45.0%	4.4%	5.7%	1.8%	—N/a	7.7%	9.6%
PNR	New Daily	5–6 Nov	1,009	±3.1%p	31.2%	43.0%	3.7%	4.7%	1.4%	—N/a	15.9%	11.8%
KSOI	TBS	5–6 Nov	1,005	±3.1%p	30.3%	45.8%	3.2%	4.7%	0.9%	—N/a	15.0%	15.5%
For more information, visit the National Election Survey Deliberation Committee

=== Polling before nominees finalized ===
Polling firm / Client		Fieldwork date	Sample size	Margin of error	DP					PPP				PP	Others	None / Undecided	Lead
Polling firm / Client		Fieldwork date	Sample size	Margin of error	Lee Jae-myung	Lee Nak-yeon	Choo Mi-ae	Chung Sye-kyun	Park Yong-jin	Yoon Suk Yeol	Choi Jae-hyung	Hong Jun-pyo	Yoo Seung-min	Ahn Cheol-soo	Others	None / Undecided	Lead
National Barometer Survey		4–6 Oct	1,006	±3.1%p	26%	11%	1%		0%	17%	1%	15%	2%	2%	3%: Sim Sang-jung 1%; Won Hui-ryong 1%; Hwang Kyo-ahn 1%; Others 1%	15%	9%
Korea Research International	MBC News	25-26 Sep	1,001	±3.1%p	27.8%	11.7%	1.8%		0.5%	17.2%	1.1%	16.3%	2.9%	0.9%	3.9%: Sim Sang-jung 0.9%; Won Hui-ryong 0.9%	15.8%	10.6%
KSOI	TBS	17–18 Sep	1,004	±3.1%p	23.6%	13.7%	2.9%	—	0.8%	28.8%	1.6%	15.4%	2.9%	2.4%	3.4%: Sim Sang-jung 2.1%	4.6%	5.2%
National Barometer Survey		13–15 Sep	1,007	±3.1%p	28%	11%	2%		0%	20%	1%	14%	2%	2%	3%: Sim Sang-jung 1%; Won Hui-ryong 1%; Others 1%	15%	8%
KSOI	TBS	3–4 Sep	1,003	±3.1%p	28.0%	11.7%	2.5%	—	0.8%	26.4%	4.1%	13.6%	3.7%	1.6%	2.5%: Sim Sang-jung 1.4%	4.9%	1.6%
Gallup Korea		31 Aug – 2 Sep	1,000	±3.1%p	24%	8%	1%	1%	—	19%	2%	6%	2%	2%	3%	32%	5%
National Barometer Survey		30 Aug – 1 Sep	1,012	±3.1%p	25%	10%	2%	1%	1%	19%	2%	10%	2%	3%	4%: Sim Sang-jung 1%; Won Hui-ryong 1%; Others 1%	21%	6%
KSOI	TBS	27–28 Aug	1,015	±3.1%p	29.1%	13.6%	3.0%	—	0.7%	27.4%	2.3%	9.4%	3.4%	2.6%	3.4%: Sim Sang-jung 1.6%	5.0%	1.7%
RnSearch	Gyeonggi Shinmun	25–26 Aug	1,010	±3.1%p	27.2%	15.1%	1.8%	1.8%	0.6%	26.8%	3.7%	8.2%	3.2%	2.3%	3.2%: Others 3.2%	6.0%	0.4%
National Barometer Survey		23–25 Aug	1,004	±3.1%p	26%	9%	1%	1%	0%	20%	2%	7%	2%	3%	5%: Sim Sang-jung 2%; Won Hui-ryong 1%; Others 1%	25%	6%
Realmeter	JTBC	21–22 Aug	1,004	±3.1%p	27.7%	14.1%	2.9%	2.2%	0.3%	30.4%	5.0%	6.8%	2.6%	1.5%	3.3%: Others 3.3%	3.3%	2.7%
KSOI	TBS	20–21 Aug	1,007	±3.1%p	26.8%	12.4%	3.3%	0%	0.4%	29.8%	5.1%	8.4%	3.6%	1.5%	4.1%: Others 4.1%	4.5%	3%
National Barometer Survey		16–18 Aug	1,010	±3.1%p	26%	10%	2%	1%	0%	19%	3%	4%	2%	3%	3%: Sim Sang-jung 1%; Won Hui-ryong 2%; Others 0%	25%	7%
Korea Research International	MBC News	16–17 Aug	1,002	±3.1%p	29.8%	10.6%	1.4%	1.0%	0.5%	19.5%	3.9%	5.3%	2.8%	2.8%	3.9%: Sim Sang-jung 1.2%; Won Hui-ryong 0.8%	18.5%	10.3%
Next Research	SBS News	13–14 Aug	1,004	±3.1%p	23.2%	10.6%	2.7%	1.0%	0.3%	21.7%	3.2%	7.0%	2.3%	2.5%	3.2%: Sim Sang-jung 1.3%; Won Hui-ryong 1.3%	22.3%	1.5%
KSOI	TBS	13–14 Aug	1,007	±3.1%p	26.2%	12.9%	4.0%	1.8%	0.8%	30.6%	0%	7.3%	3.4%	2.4%	5.2%: Others 5.2%	5.4%	4.4%
Hankook Research	KBS News	12–14 Aug	1,000	±3.1%p	25.6%	11.0%	2.1%	0.9%	0.4%	18.1%	4.4%	4.8%	2.3%	2.4%	5.8%: Sim Sang-jung 1.5%; Won Hui-ryong 1.0%; Hwang Kyo-ahn 0.6%; Ha Tae-kyoung 0.5%; Kim Du-kwan 0.4%; Others 1.8%	22.2%	7.5%
Media Research	OBS	11–12 Aug	1,000	±3.1%p	26.6%	17.0%	3.5%	1.7%	0.4%	26.4%	5.6%	4.6%	2.8%	1.9%	4%: Sim Sang-jung 0.2%; Won Hui-ryong 0.5%	5.5%	0.2%
National Barometer Survey		9–11 Aug	1,017	±3.1%p	23%	12%	2%	1%	0%	19%	3%	5%	2%	3%	2%: Sim Sang-jung 1%; Won Hui-ryong 1%	27%	4%
Realmeter	Oh My News	9–10 Aug	2,031	±2.2%p	25.9%	12.9%	2.9%	2.1%	1.1%	26.3%	6.1%	5.4%	2.4%	2.3%	7.6%: Sim Sang-jung 1.1%; Others 6.5%	5.0%	0.4%
KSOI	TBS	6–7 Aug	1,004	±3.1%p	28.4%	16.2%	3.2%	1.3%	0.3%	28.3%	6.1%	4.2%	3.5%	2.5%	2.0%: Others 2.0%	3.9%	0.1%
Gallup Korea		3–5 Aug	1,001	±3.1%p	25%	11%	1%	1%	—	19%	4%	2%	—	1%	3%	29%	6%
National Barometer Survey		2–4 Aug	1,003	±3.1%p	28%	10%	2%	1%	0%	22%	3%	4%	1%	2%	4%: Sim Sang-jung 1%; Won Hui-ryong 1%; Hwang Kyo-ahn 1%; Others 1%	23%	6%
KSOI	TBS	30–31 Jul	1,013	±3.1%p	27.4%	16.0%	3.9%	1.2%	0.7%	32.3%	5.8%	4.1%	2.4%	2.2%	1.6%: Others 1.6%	2.4%	4.9%
30 July 2021					Yoon Suk Yeol joins the People Power Party												
National Barometer Survey		26–28 Jul	1,003	±3.1%p	25%	12%	1%	1%	0%	19%	3%	3%	2%	1%	2%: Sim Sang-jung 1%; Won Hui-ryong 1%	28%	6%
Hangil Research	Kukinews	24–26 Jul	1,006	±3.1%p	23.7%	15.8%	5.2%	—	—	29.8%	—	4.4%	3.5%	—	6.7%: Others 6.7%	10.8%	6.1%
WinG Korea	Asia Business	24–25 Jul	1,008	±3.1%p	28.6%	16.9%	3.4%	2.4%	0.9%	24.3%	5.9%	5%	2.6%	2%	3.5%: Won Hui-ryong 1.4%; Park Yong-jin 0.7%; Others 4.8%	5.5%	4.3%
KSOI	TBS	23–24 Jul	1,006	±3.1%p	26%	18.2%	2.5%	2.3%	0.8%	26.9%	8.1%	4.7%	2.8%	2%	2.3%: Others 1.0%	4.9%	0.9%
National Barometer Survey		19–21 Jul	1,005	±3.1%p	27%	14%	2%	1%	0%	19%	3%	4%	2%	3%	4%: Sim Sang-jung 2%; Won Hui-ryong 1%; Hwang Kyo-ahn 0%; Others 1%	26%	8%
KRi	MBC News	17–18 Jul	1,015	±3.1%p	27.1%	14.6%	2.9%	1.3%		19.7%	4.8%	3.9%	1.1%	2.8%	5.5%: Won Hee-ryong 1.5%; Kim Du-kwan 1.0%; Kim Dong-yeon 0.9%; Others 2.1%	2.4%	7.4%
Realmeter	JTBC	17–18 Jul	1,000	±3.1%p	23.8%	20.1%	4.5%	6.4%	0.9%	22%	6%	4.6%	2%	1.7%	5.5%: Won Hee-ryong 1.5%; Kim Du-kwan 1.0%; Kim Dong-yeon 0.9%; Others 2.1%	2.4%	1.8%
KSOI	TBS	16–17 Jul	1,013	±3.1%p	25.4%	19.3%	3.4%	—	0.9%	30.3%	5.6%	3.3%	2.3%	2.2%	2.3%: Sim Sang-jung 1.2%; Others 1.1%	4.9%	4.9%
15 July 2021					Choi Jae-hyung joins the People Power Party												
National Barometer Survey		12–14 Jul	1,016	±3.1%p	26%	14%	3%	1%	0%	20%	3%	4%	2%	2%	4%: Sim Sang-jung 2%; Hwang Kyo-ahn 1%; Won Hui-ryong 0%; Kim Du-kwan 0%; Ha Tae-kyoung 0%; Others 1%	22%	6%
HRI	Seoul Shinmun	12–14 Jul	1,208	±2.83%p	27.2%	16%	2.9%	2.6%	—	26.8%	5.1%	4%	3.1%	2%	0.3%	9.8%	0.4%
NEXT	SBS News	12–13 Jul	1,001	±3.1%p	25.1%	12%	3.8%	1.4%	—	24.5%	3.2%	4.2%	1.9%	2.2%	2.7%: Sim Sang-jung 1.2%; Kim Du-kwan 0.3%; Others 0.4%	19%	0.6%
Jowon C&I	Straight News	10–12 Jul	1,000	±3.1%p	27.4%	16.4%	5%	2.8%	1.1%	28.9%	3.6%	4.8%	2.6%	2.7%	'1.9%	2.9%	1.5%
WinG Korea	Asia Business	10–11 Jul	1,011	±3.1%p	25.8%	16.4%	4.7%	3%	1.3%	26.4%	4.1%	4.8%	3.2%	2.1%	2.9%: Won Hui-ryong 1.3%; Ha Tae-kyoung 0.5%; Others 1.1%	5.2%	0.6%
KSOI	TBS	9–10 Jul	1,014	±3.1%p	26.9%	18.1%	4.2%	1.7%	—	29.9%	2.5%	4.1%	4.5%	2.1%	1.9%: Sim Sang-jung 0.9%; Others 1.0%	3.9%	3%
KSOI	TBS	6–8 Jul	1,400	±3.1%p	28.4%	16.2%	3.2%	1.3%	0.3%	28.3%	6.1%	4.2%	3.5%	2.5%	2.0%: Others 2.0%	3.9%	0.1%
National Barometer Survey		5–7 Jul	1,005	±3.1%p	27%	10%	2%	2%	0%	21%	—	4%	2%	2%	4%: Sim Sang-jung 2%; Won Hui-ryong 1%; Hwang Kyo-ahn 0%; Others 1%	26%	6%
KIR	News Phim	5 Jul	1,012	±3.1%p	29%	11.8%	3.7%	2.4%	0.5%	31.6%	2.4%	4.1%	2.6%	2.4%	4.5%: Yoon Hui-sook 1.8%; Won Hui-ryong 0.9%; Ha Tae-kyoung 0.5%; Lee Kwang-jae 0.4%; Others 0.9%	5.1%	2.6%
Realmeter	JTBC	3–4 Jul	1,015	±3.1%p	26.3%	12.5%	6.4%	1.7%	0.4%	33.9%	2.5%	4.7%	2.3%	1.8%	4.4%: Kim Du-kwan 0.4%; Won Hui-ryong 0.5%; Yoon Hui-sook 2.1%; Lee Kwang-jae 0.8%; Others 0.6%	3.2%	7.6%
PNR	Money Today/Mirae Hankook	3 Jul	1,001	±3.1%p	26.2%	13.7%	4.1%	3.2%	0.8%	36.1%	2.5%	4.6%	2.5%	3.1%	3.1%: Sim Sang-jung 0.5%; Others 2.6%	3.2%	9.9%
KSOI	TBS	2–3 Jul	1,002	±3.1%p	30.3%	12.2%	3.9%	2.6%	0.5%	31.4%	3.2%	3.9%	2.3%	3.1%	1.3%	5.5%	1.1%
Global Research		30 Jun–2 Jul	1,000	±3.1%p	26.5%	9.4%	2.4%	1.8%	0.4%	25%	2.4%	3.6%	2.9%	1.8%	2.3%: Hwang Kyo-ahn 0.7%; Sim Sang-jung 0.6%; Others 1.0%	21.5%	1.5%
Gallup Korea		29 Jun–1 Jul	1,000	±3.1%p	24%	6%	2%	2%	—	25%	2%	2%	—	1%	3%	32%	1%
National Barometer Survey		28–30 Jun	1,007	±3.1%p	27%	9%	3%	1%	1%	21%	—	3%	2%	3%	6%: Hwang Kyo-ahn 1%; Sim Sang-jung 1%; Won Hui-ryong 1%; Lee Kwang-jae 1%; Others 2%	27%	6%
Jowon C&I	Ilyo Shinmun	27–29 Jun	1,046	±3%p	23.7%	8.4%	4.8%	3.4%	1.3%	34.3%	5.6%	6.1%	2.7%	3.9%	2.4%	3.4%	10.6%
WinG Korea	Asia Business	26–27 Jun	1,009	±3.1%p	26.6%	9.5%	5.1%	2.2%	0.9%	30.7%	3.3%	5.7%	4.1%	2.7%	3.5%: Lee Kwang-jae 1.2%; Ma Kyoung-won 1.0%; Others 1.3%	5.5%	4.1%
PNR	Money Today/Mirae Hankook	26 Jun	1,002	±3.1%p	25.5%	13%	5.5%	2.6%	0.3%	32.7%	3.7%	6.1%	3.1%	—	3.2%: Sim Sang-jung 0.9%; Others 2.3%	4.5%	7.2%
KSOI	TBS	25–26 Jun	1,004	±3.1%p	28.4%	11.5%	4.7%	—	0.7%	32.4%	—	6.4%	3.1%	2.1%	6%: Oh Se-hoon 1.5%; Sim Sang-jung 1.5%; Others 3.0%	4.6%	4%
24 June 2021					Hong Jun-pyo rejoined the PPP (formerly the United Future Party)												
National Barometer Survey		21–23 Jun	1,006	±3.1%p	27%	7%	2%	2%	0%	20%	—	3%	1%	3%	4%: Hwang Kyo-ahn 1%; Sim Sang-jung 1%; Others 2%	30%	7%
Realmeter	Oh My News	21–22 Jun	2,014	±2.2%p	22.8%	8.4%	3.9%	3%	0.7%	32.3%	3.6%	4.1%	3%	2.6%	8.9%: Oh Se-hoon 3.2%; Sim Sang-jung 0.9%; Lee Kwang-jae 1.7%; Choi Moon-soon 1.0%; Ha Tae-kyoung 0.7%; Others 1.4%	6.7%	9.5%
Realmeter	JTBC	19–20 Jun	1,028	±3.1%p	29.3%	11.5%	3.9%	2.5%	0.6%	32%	3.7%	4.4%	2.4%	2.4%	2.1%: Kim Dong-yeon 0.8%; Others 1.3%	5.2%	2.7%
PNR	Money Today/Mirae Hankook	19 Jun	1,003	±3.1%p	27.2%	13%	—	4.7%	—	33.9%	4.5%	4.3%	—	3.1%	5.2%: Sim Sang-jung 1.8%; Others 3.4%	4.2%	6.7%
KSOI	TBS	18–19 Jun	1,004	±3.1%p	25%	12.2%	2.7%	—	0.9%	38%	—	4%	3.1%	1.7%	7.1%: Oh Se-hoon 3.3%; Sim Sang-jung 1.4%; Others 2.4%	5.5%	13%
KIR	News Phim	18 Jun	1,012	±3.1%p	27.2%	8.4%	—	4%	0.8%	36.7%	—	4.7%	2.6%	3.6%	6.7%: Won Hui-ryong 0.6%; Ha Tae-kyoung 1.3%; Lee Kwang-jae 2.1%; Kim Du-kwan 1.0%; Others 1.7%	5.4%	9.5%
National Barometer Survey		14–16 Jun	1,004	±3.1%p	25%	7%	1%	1%	0%	24%	—	2%	1%	3%	3%: Sim Sang-jung 1%; Won Hui-ryong 1%; Hwang Kyo-ahn 0%; Lee Kwang-jae 0%; Others 1%	32%	1%
WinG Korea	Asia Business	12–13 Jun	1,017	±3.1%p	28.3%	10%	—	2.1%	1.2%	33.3%	2.7%	3.9%	2.7%	3.2%	4.9%: Lee Kwang-jae 1.4%; Won Hui-ryong 1.1%; Choi Moon-soon 0.5%; Others 1.9%	7.5%	5%
PNR	Money Today/Mirae Hankook	12 Jun	1,003	±3.1%p	26.2%	12.3%	—	2.6%	—	39.1%	—	5.9%	—	2.7%	5.2%: Sim Sang-jung 1.2%; Others 3.7%	6.3%	12.9%
KSOI	TBS	11–12 Jun	1,007	±3.1%p	27.7%	12.6%	2.2%	1.8%	—	35.5%	—	4.1%	1.4%	2.6%	6.8%: Oh Se-hoon 2.8%; Sim Sang-jung 2.3%; Others 1.7%	7.5%	7.8%
National Barometer Survey		7–9 Jun	1,010	±3.1%p	24%	7%	1%	2%	0%	24%	—	3%	2%	3%	3%: Sim Sang-jung 1%; Lee Kwang-jae 1%; Hwang Kyo-ahn 0%; Won Hui-ryong 0%; Others 1%	30%	Tie
KSOI	TBS	5–6 Jun	1,009	±3.1%p	26.1%	10.2%	4%	3.5%	—	31.1%	—	3.5%	3%	2.5%	6.8%: Oh Se-hoon 4.0%; Sim Sang-jung 1.8%; Others 1.9%	8.3%	5%
PNR	Money Today/Mirae Hankook	5 Jun	1,002	±3.1%p	25.7%	13.8%	—	3.7%	—	35.7%	—	5.4%	4.1%	2.5%	5.6%: Sim Sang-jung 2.0%; Others 3.6%	5.9%	10%
Gallup Korea		1–3 Jun	1,002	±3.1%p	24%	5%	—	1%	—	21%	—	2%	—	3%	11%: Lee Jun-seok 3.0%; Oh Se-hoon 2.0%; Others 6%	36%	3%
National Barometer Survey		31 May–2 Jun	1,008	±3.1%p	28%	9%	1%	2%	0%	20%	—	3%	1%	3%	5%: Sim Sang-jung 1%; Lee Kwang-jae 1%; Hwang Kyo-ahn 2%; Won Hui-ryong 0%; Kim Boo-kyum 0%; Others 1%	28%	8%
Jowon C&I	Ilyo Shinmun	30 May–1 Jun	1,003	±3.1%p	26.4%	11.3%	—	3%	0.5%	28.7%	3.9%	5.8%	2.1%	3.6%	11.4%: Na Kyoung-won 2.6%; Sim Sang-jung 1.8%; Kim Dong-yeon 1.7%; Kim Du-kwan 1.3%; Lee Kwang-jae 1.8%; Yang Seung-jo 0.8%; Won Hui-ryong 0.5%; Others 0.9%	4.1%	2.3%
For more information, visit the National Election Survey Deliberation Committee

=== Hypothetical polling ===
==== Lee Jae-myung vs. Yoon Suk Yeol ====
Polling firm / Client		Fieldwork date	Sample size	Margin of error	Lee Jae-myung	Yoon Suk Yeol	Others/ Undecided	Lead
RnSearch	Gyeonggi Shinmun	3–4 Sep	1,017	±3.1%p	34.3%	37.0%	28.7%	2.7%
National Barometer Survey		30 Aug – 1 Sep	1,012	±3.1%p	42%	35%	23%	7%
RnSearch	Gyeonggi Shinmun	25–26 Aug	1,010	±3.1%p	34.1%	38.8%	27.0%	4.7%
National Barometer Survey		23–25 Aug	1,004	±3.1%p	40%	34%	27%	6%
Realmeter	Oh My News	23–24 Aug	2,015	±2.2%p	36.3%	42.5%	21.2%	6.2%
Jowon C&I	Straight News	21–23 Aug	1,004	±3.1%p	35.6%	41.7%	22.6%	6.1%
Hangil Research	Polinews	21–23 Aug	1,004	±3.1%p	37.0%	42.6%	20.5%	5.6%
Realmeter	JTBC	21–22 Aug	1,004	±3.1%p	39.4%	42.6%	18.0%	3.2%
Gallup Korea		17–19 Aug	1,001	±3.1%p	46%	34%	19%	12%
National Barometer Survey		16–18 Aug	1,010	±3.1%p	43%	35%	23%	8%
Korea Research International	MBC News	16–17 Aug	1,002	±3.1%p	44.7%	35.3%	19.9%	9.4%
Next Research	SBS News	13–14 Aug	1,004	±3.1%p	36.9%	35.4%	27.6%	1.5%
Hankook Research	KBS News	12–14 Aug	1,000	±3.1%p	44.2%	36.9%	18.9%	7.3%
National Barometer Survey		9–11 Aug	1,017	±3.1%p	41%	33%	27%	8%
PNR	New Daily	10 Aug	1,011	±3.1%p	35.4%	42.4%	22.2%	7%
Realmeter	Oh My News	9–10 Aug	2,031	±2.2%p	35.9%	42.1%	22.0%	6.2%
Jowon C&I	Straight News	7–9 Aug	1,003	±3.1%p	38.1%	38.4%	23.6%	0.3%
WinG Korea	Asia Business	7–8 Aug	1,006	±3.1%p	41.8%	41.3%	16.9%	0.5%
National Barometer Survey		2–4 Aug	1,003	±3.1%p	42%	35%	23%	7%
Jowon C&I	Ilyo Shinmun	1–3 Aug	1,000	±3.1%p	35.7%	42.5%	21.9%	6.8%
Realmeter	News the One	28–29 Jul	1,003	±3.1%p	36.1%	46.6%	17.3%	10.5%
RnSearch	MBN/Maeil Business	26–28 Jul	1,102	±3%p	34.6%	38.3%	27.2%	3.7%
Jowon C&I	Straight News	24–26 Jul	1,001	±3.1%p	38%	40.2%	21.8%	2.2%
Hangil Research	Kukinews	24–26 Jul	1,006	±3.1%p	36.9%	41.1%	21.9%	4.2%
National Barometer Survey		19–21 Jul	1,003	±3.1%p	46%	33%	20%	13%
KRi	MBC News	17–18 Jul	1,015	±3.1%p	43%	41%	16%	2%
Realmeter	JTBC	17–18 Jul	1,000	±3.1%p	44%	34.9%	18.6%	9.1%
Realmeter	Seoul Shinmun	12–14 Jul	1,208	±2.83%p	48.9%	43%	8.1%	5.9%
RnSearch	MBN/Maeil Business	12–14 Jul	1,060	±3%p	33.7%	37.9%	28.4%	4.2%
Realmeter	Oh My News	12–13 Jul	2,036	±2.2%p	38.6%	39.4%	22%	0.8%
NEXT	SBS News	12–13 Jul	1,001	±3.1%p	36.9%	34%	29.1%	2.9%
Hangil Research	Kukinews	10–12 Jul	1,001	±3.1%p	43.9%	36%	20.1%	7.9%
WinG Korea	Asia Business	10–11 Jul	1,011	±3.1%p	41.5%	42.2%	16.3%	0.7%
National Barometer Survey		5–7 Jul	1,005	±3.1%p	43%	33%	24%	9%
Realmeter	JTBC	3–4 Jul	1,015	±3.1%p	39.4%	43.6%	17%	4.2%
PNR	Money Today/Mirae Hankook	3 Jul	1,001	±3.1%p	41.8%	49.8%	9.4%	8%
RnSearch	MBN/Maeil Business	28–30 Jun	1,000	±3%p	34.7%	41.4%	24.9%	6.7%
Jowon C&I	Ilyo Shinmun	27–29 Jun	1,000	±3.1%p	33.1%	44.9%	22.1%	11.8%
WinG Korea	Asia Business	26–27 Jun	1,009	±3.1%p	40.5%	48.7%	10.8%	8.2%
PNR	Money Today/Mirae Hankook	26 Jun	1,002	±3.1%p	40.5%	50.5%	9%	10%
Realmeter	Oh My News	21–22 Jun	2,014	±2.2%p	35.1%	47.7%	17.3%	12.6%
For more information, visit the National Election Survey Deliberation Committee
