= Pro-Park New Party =

Pro-Park New Party 친박신당
- Abbreviation: PNP
- Leader: Hong Moon-jong
- Secretary-General: Shin Jae-chun
- Founded: February 25, 2020
- Dissolved: April 16, 2024
- Ideology: Conservatism (South Korean); Pro-Park Geun-hye
- Political position: Far-right
- Colours: Red; Blue; Green

Website
- www.pro-parknewparty.kr

The Pro-Park New Party (Korean: 친박신당; RR: Chinbak sindang; sometimes translated as the New Pro-Park Party) was a South Korean political party led by Hong Moon-jong.

== History ==
The party was formed by Hong Moon-jong, an MP for Uijeongbu 2nd constituency elected under the Saenuri Party banner in 2012 election. He remained within the party after the party changed its name to Liberty Korea Party, however, when the Korean Patriots' Party (KPP) was formed by Cho Won-jin, he frequently attended to protests organised by the KPP.

On 15 June 2019, Hong announced his withdrawal from the LKP and officially exited 2 days later. Prior to his withdrawal, he was already elected as the co-Presidents of the KPP and later the party changed its name to the Our Republican Party (ORP). Nevertheless, both soon faced conflicts and on 10 February 2020, Hong was removed from the ORP.

On 25 February, the Pro-Park New Party was officially established and Hong was elected as its new leader. For the upcoming general election, he proposed an electoral alliance with the Liberty Unification Party and the other nonpartisan pro-Park Geun-hye figures i.e. Byun Hui-jae.

Hanjin Lew (Korean Wikipedia), PNP's Spokesperson for International Affairs, explained the PNP's foundation, its political philosophy, and international relations during an interview with One Korea News Network - Hawaii.

== U.S.-Japan-RoK Tripartite Alliance ==
The PNP is a staunch supporter of the U.S.-Japan-RoK tripartite alliance. The party's famous pro-US stance was visible when several MPs criticized that U.S. Ambassador Harry B. Harris Jr. was rude, Hong defended Ambassador Harris saying that he was in no way rude to him.

== President Park Geun-hye ==
In an interview with Japan Forward, Sankei Shimbun's English Newspaper, spokesman Lew explained the inherent link between human rights and international security and called for immediate release of President Park Geun-hye to safeguard freedom of the South, Japan and the U.S.
