= List of newspapers in South Korea =

A list of newspapers in South Korea.

== National papers ==
=== Top 10 comprehensive daily newspapers ===
- The Chosun Ilbo (daily) 1,212,208
- The Dong-A Ilbo (daily) 925,919
- JoongAng Ilbo (daily) 861,984
- Hankook Ilbo (daily) 219,672
- Hankyoreh (daily) 205,748
- Munhwa Ilbo (daily) 195,068
- Kyunghyang Shinmun (daily) 190,677
- Seoul Shinmun (daily) 160,348
- Segye Ilbo (daily) 93,669
- Kookmin Ilbo (daily) 74,685

== English language ==
- Korea Economic Daily (Seoul, national, English)
- Korea JoongAng Daily (Seoul, national, English)
- The Korea Herald (Seoul, national, English)
- The Korea Times (Seoul, national, English)
- Indigo (Busan, international, English)

== Others ==
- Aju Business Daily (Seoul, national)
- Busan Ilbo (Busan, regional)
- Chungcheong Daily (Cheongju, regional)
- Daegu Shinmun (Daegu, local)
- Daejeon Ilbo (Daejeon, regional)
- Dongyang Ilbo (Cheongju, regional)
- Electronics Daily (Seoul, national)
- Financial News (Seoul, national)
- Gangwon Ilbo (Chuncheon, regional)
- Gangwon Shinmun (Wonju, regional)
- Good Day (Seoul, national)
- Gyeongnam Domin Ilbo (South Gyeongsang Province, regional)
- Gyeongnam Ilbo (South Gyeongsang Province)
- Halla Ilbo (Jeju, regional)
- Hankook Gyeongje (Seoul, national)
- Herald Economy (Seoul, national)
- Ilgan Sports (Seoul, national)
- Jeju Ilbo (Jeju, regional)
- Kookje Shinmun (Busan, regional)
- Kyosu Shinmun
- Maeil Gyeongje (Seoul, national)
- Media Today
- Money Today (Seoul, national)
- Naeil Shinmun
- NewsPim
- Seoul Gyeongje (Seoul, national)
- Sisa Journal
- Sports Chosun (Seoul, national)
- Sports Seoul (Seoul, national)
- Sports Today (Seoul, national)
- Stock Daily (Seoul, national)
- The Korea Islam Herald
- The Muslim Weekly News
- The Sportschosun (Seoul, national)
- Al-Islam

== See also ==
- Newspapers in Korea
- Ministry of Culture and Tourism (South Korea)
  - Korea Newspaper Circulation Service
- Magazines in Korea
- Minjok Ilbo
