= Our Republican Party =

South Korea's far-right party, the Our Republican Party, has been founded twice historically.

- Our Republican Party (2017)
- Our Republican Party (2020)
