= List of cities and counties of North Jeolla Province =

North Jeolla Province is divided into 6 cities (si) and 8 counties (gun). They're also divided into 14 towns (eup), 145 townships (myeon), and 82 neighborhoods (dong).

== Table ==
Name	Hangul	Hanja	Household	Populantion (2015)	Area(km^{2}) (2012)
Jeonju	전주시	全州市			
Gunsan	군산시	群山市			
Iksan	익산시	益山市			
Gimje	김제시	金堤市			
Jeongeup	정읍시	井邑市			
Namwon	남원시	南原市			
Jangsu County	장수군	長水郡			
Jinan County	진안군	鎭安郡			
Muju County	무주군	茂朱郡			
Imsil County	임실군	任實郡			
Sunchang County	순창군	淳昌郡			
Buan County	부안군	扶安郡			
Gochang County	고창군	高敞郡			
Wanju County	완주군	完州郡			
North Jeolla Province	전라북도	全羅北道			

== Former ==
Name	Hangul	RR	Abolished	Current
Geumsan County	금산군	Geumsan-gun	1 Jan 1963	Geumsan, South Chungcheong Province
Gimje County	김제군	Gimje-gun	1 Jan 1995	Gimje
Namwon County	남원군	Namwon-gun	1 Jan 1995	Namwon
Okku County	옥구군	Okku-gun	1 Jan 1995	Gunsan
Iri City	이리시	Iri-si	10 May 1995	Iksan
Iksan County	익산군	Iksan-gun	10 May 1995	Iksan
Jeongeup County	정읍군	Jeongeup-gun	1 Jan 1995	Jeongeup
Jeongju City	정주시	Jeongju-si	1 Jan 1995	Jeongeup

== See also ==
- List of cities in South Korea
