= Hong Moon-jong =

South Korean politician

- 홍문종

President of the New Pro-Park Party
- In office 25 February 2020 – 16 December 2022
- Preceded by: Position established

President of the Our Republican Party
- In office 24 June 2019; Serving with Cho Won-jin as President of Korean Patriots' Party: 17 June 2019 – 24 June 2019 – 10 February 2020
- Preceded by: Cho Won-jin

Member of the National Assembly
- In office 30 May 2012 – 29 May 2020
- Preceded by: Kang Sung-jong
- Succeeded by: Kim Min-chul
- Constituency: Uijeongbu B (Gyeonggi)
- In office 25 April 2003 – 29 May 2004
- Preceded by: Moon Hee-sang
- Succeeded by: Moon Hee-sang (Uijeongbu A, Gyeonggi); Kang Sung-jong (Uijeongbu B, Gyeonggi)
- Constituency: Uijeongbu (Gyeonggi)
- In office 30 May 1996 – 29 May 2000
- Preceded by: Moon Hee-sang
- Succeeded by: Moon Hee-sang

Personal details
- Born: 26 May 1955 (age 71) Yangju Gyeonggi, South Korea
- Party: People Power
- Other political affiliations: Democratic Liberal Party (1995); New Korea Party (1995–1997); Grand National Party (1997–1998); National Congress for New Politics (1998–2000); Millennium Democratic Party (2000); Independent (1998, 2000–2002); Grand National Party (2002–2006); Independent (2006–2012); Saenuri Party (2012–2017); Liberty Korea Party (2017–2019); Korean Patriots' Party (2019); Our Republican Party (2019–2020); Pro-Park New Party (2020–2022); Independent (2022–2025)
- Spouse: Lee So-young
- Parent: Hong Woo-jun
- Relatives: See Namyang Hong clan
- Education: Harvard University
- Occupation: Politician

Korean name
- Hangul: 홍문종
- Hanja: 洪文鐘
- RR: Hong Munjong
- MR: Hong Munjong

Hong Moon-jong (Korean: 홍문종; born 26 May 1955) is a South Korean politician who served as the Member of the National Assembly for Uijeongbu B constituency. He also served as the Secretary-General of the Saenuri Party. He is the son of the late former politician Hong Woo-jun.

Born at Yangju, Hong studied at Harvard University. He started his political career when he entered to the Democratic Liberal Party (then New Korea Party aka NKP) in 1995. During the general election in 1996, he defeated Moon Hee-sang from the National Congress for New Politics (NCNP). In 1997, he left the NKP and joined the National Party - New (NPN) in order to endorse Lee In-je as the upcoming President. Hong stood as a nonpartisan candidate in 2000 despite his loss. He temporarily came back as an MP after the by-election in 2003, till he lost just after a year.

After involving several controversies, Hong officially came back as MP in 2012. He was then re-elected in 2016. As one of the politicians supporting ex-President Park Geun-hye, he endorsed her as President in 2007. He unsuccessfully ran as the parliamentary leader of the Liberty Korea Party (LKP) in 2017.

In 2019, Hong announced to leave the LKP. A minor political party named the Korean Patriots' Party elected Hong as the party president along with incumbent Cho Won-jin, and the party officially changed their name as the Our Republican Party (ORP).

On 10 February 2020, Hong was sacked from the ORP after long-time conflicts with Cho. He then formed the new party named Pro-Park New Party.

== Election results ==
Year	Elections	Constituency	Political party	Votes (%)	Results
1996	15th National Assembly General Election	Uijeongbu (Gyeonggi)	NKP	40,507 (35.67%)	Won
2000	16th National Assembly General Election	Uijeongbu (Gyeonggi)	Independent	26,465 (20.27%)	Defeated
2003	2003 By-election	Uijeongbu (Gyeonggi)	GNP	35,301 (50.16%)	Won
2004	17th National Assembly General Election	Uijeongbu A (Gyeonggi)	GNP	34,422 (41.89%)	Defeated
2012	19th National Assembly General Election	Uijeongbu B (Gyeonggi)	Saenuri	41,726 (49.07%)	Won
2016	20th National Assembly General Election	Uijeongbu B (Gyeonggi)	Saenuri	41,987 (41.51%)	Won
2020	21st National Assembly General Election	Proportional Representation (2nd)	P-P NP	142,747 (0.51%)	Not Elected
