= Chung Sye-kyun =

Prime Minister of South Korea from 2020 to 2021

His Excellency Chung Sye-kyun
- 정세균
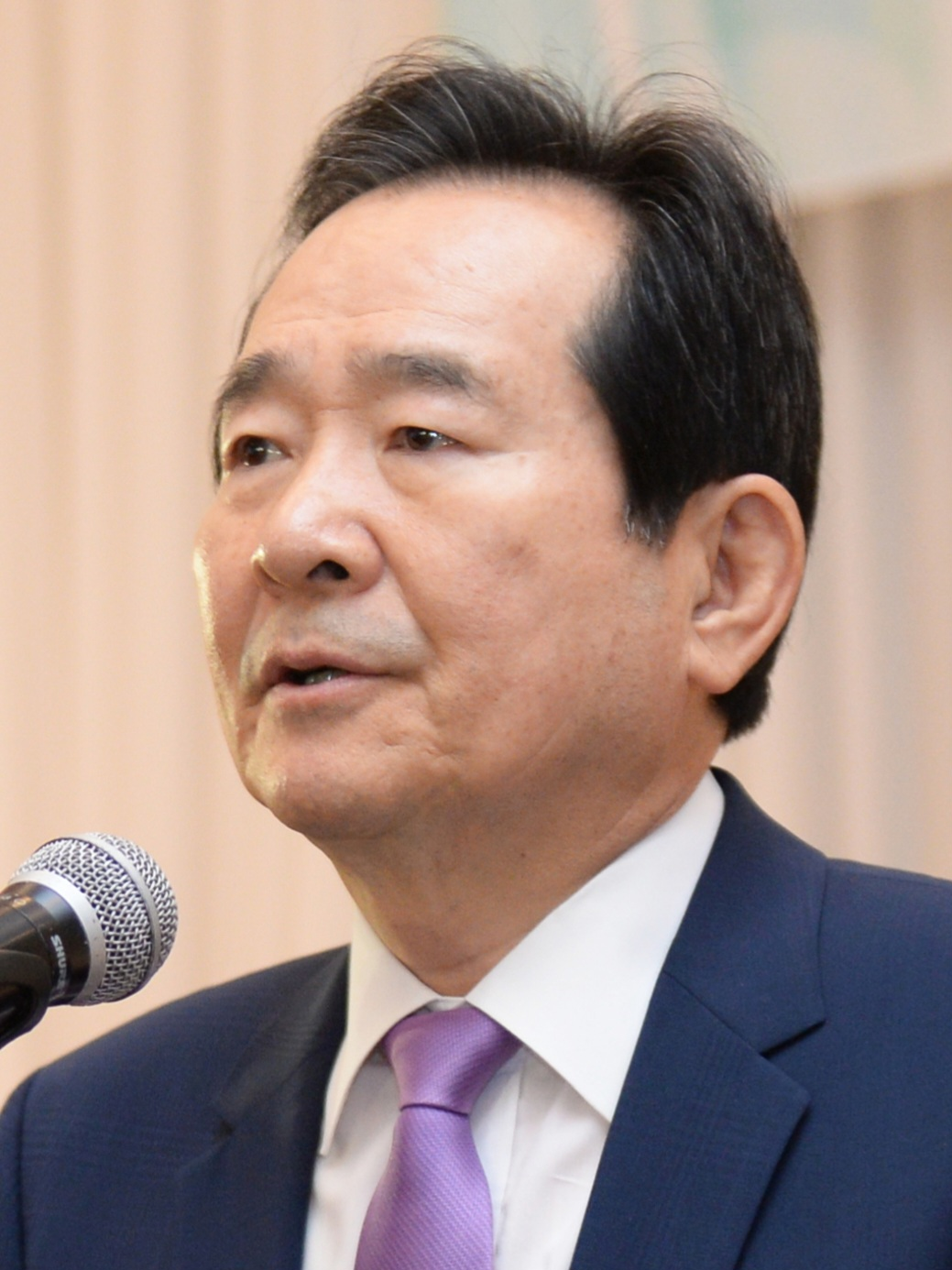
- Chung in 2016

46th Prime Minister of South Korea
- In office 14 January 2020 – 16 April 2021
- President: Moon Jae-in
- Deputy: Yoo Eun-hae; Hong Nam-ki
- Preceded by: Lee Nak-yon
- Succeeded by: Hong Nam-ki (acting); Kim Boo-kyum

Speaker of the National Assembly
- In office 9 June 2016 – 29 May 2018
- President: Park Geun-hye; Hwang Kyo-ahn (Acting); Moon Jae-in
- Deputy: Shim Jae-chul; Park Joo-sun
- Preceded by: Chung Ui-hwa
- Succeeded by: Moon Hee-sang

Member of the National Assembly
- In office 30 May 1996 – 29 May 2004
- Preceded by: Hwang In-sung
- Succeeded by: himself (as Jinan-Muju-Jangsu-Imsil)
- Constituency: Jinan–Muju–Jangsu (North Jeolla)
- In office 30 May 2004 – 29 May 2012
- Preceded by: himself (as Jinan-Muju-Jangsu); Kim Tai-shik (as Wanju-Imsil)
- Succeeded by: Park Min-soo
- Constituency: Jinan–Muju–Jangsu–Imsil (North Jeolla)
- In office 30 May 2012 – 29 May 2020
- Preceded by: Park Jin
- Succeeded by: Lee Nak-yon
- Constituency: Jongno (Seoul)

Chairman of the Democratic Party
- In office 7 July 2008 – 2 August 2010
- Preceded by: Sohn Hak-kyu and Park Sang-chun
- Succeeded by: Park Jie-won (acting); Sohn Hak-kyu

Chairman of the Uri Party
- In office 14 February 2007 – 20 August 2007
- Preceded by: Kim Geun-tae
- Succeeded by: Party dissolved

Minister of Commerce, Industry and Energy
- In office 10 February 2006 – 3 January 2007
- President: Roh Moo-hyun
- Prime Minister: Lee Hae-chan; Han Duck-soo (acting); Han Myeong-sook
- Preceded by: Lee Hee-beom
- Succeeded by: Kim Young-joo

Personal details
- Born: 5 November 1950 (age 75); 26 September 1950 of the lunisolar calendar Jinan, North Jeolla, South Korea
- Party: Democratic Party of Korea (until 2016, since 2018)
- Other political affiliations: Independent (2016–2018) as Speaker of the National Assembly, as required by law.
- Spouse: Choi Hye-kyung (최혜경)
- Education: Korea University (LLB); New York University (MA); Pepperdine University (MBA); Kyung Hee University (PhD)

Korean name
- Hangul: 정세균
- Hanja: 丁世均
- RR: Jeong Segyun
- MR: Chŏng Segyun

Chung Sye-kyun (Korean: 정세균; Hanja: 丁世均; born 5 November 1950) is a South Korean politician who served as the speaker of the National Assembly from 2016 to 2018 and as the prime minister of South Korea from 2020 to 2021.

He was previously leader of the main opposition Democratic Party between 2008 and 2010, and twice chairman of its predecessor, the Uri Party, first on an interim basis from October 2005 to January 2006 and then fully from February 2007 until the Uri Party's dissolution in August of that year.

On 9 June 2016, he was elected to a two-year term as the Speaker of the National Assembly. Upon becoming the Speaker, following the law that the Speaker cannot be a member of a party, he left the Democratic Party. His membership of the party was restored automatically when his term as Speaker expired on 29 May 2018.

== Early life and education ==
Chung was born in the village of Donghyang in Jinan, North Jeolla. From 1966 to 1969 he studied at Jeonju Shinheung High School in Jeonju, where he was a student reporter and served as chairman of the student council. As an undergraduate he studied law at Korea University, and became chairman of the student union there, graduating in 1974. He was nominated as an alternate for a U.S. Asia-Pacific student leadership project in that year. He received a master's degree from the Wagner School of Public Service at New York University in 1983, an MBA from Pepperdine University in 1993, and a doctorate from Kyung Hee University in 2000.

== Early political career ==
Chung entered the National Assembly in the 1996 parliamentary election as a member of the main liberal opposition National Congress for New Politics, representing his home county of Jinan, North Jeolla, in the Jinan–Muju–Jangsu constituency.

President Roh Moo-hyun appointed Chung the Minister of Commerce, Industry and Energy at the start of 2006. As minister, Chung received U.S. Energy Secretary Samuel W. Bodman in Seoul, and participated in the Five-Party Energy Ministerial held in Beijing on 16 December 2006, promoting energy efficiency and the development of clean energy technologies.

== Democratic Party leader (2008–10) ==
At the Democratic Party national convention on 6 July 2008, Chung was elected leader of the party, defeating Choo Mi-ae, his closest competitor.

In July 2009, Chung went on a six-day hunger strike to protest a series of media laws passed by the ruling Grand National Party. He resigned his assembly seat on 24 July alongside Chun Jung-bae, labeling the bills invalid and stating that passing legislation through "illegal voting and violence cannot be justified". Some 70 Democratic lawmakers also handed letters of resignation to Chung, and Chung announced that the party would begin a hundred-day campaign in the streets against the laws. Chung and his fellow party members returned to the assembly on 27 August after a month of protests.

Chung faced calls to resign as party leader after the Democratic Party underperformed in the 2010 by-elections, losing five of the eight seats being contested. He accepted the demands and resigned alongside the rest of the party leadership on 2 August taking responsibility for the defeat.

== Later legislative career (2010–present) ==
In the 2012 parliamentary election, Chung moved from Jeolla to Seoul to contest Jongno, an important constituency encompassing the Dongdaemun and the presidential residence at the Blue House. He defeated his Saenuri Party competitor Hong Sa-duk, a six-term assemblyman and leading supporter of Park Geun-hye. Remaining in Jongno as a member of the Minjoo Party of Korea, four years later in the 2016 elections Chung successfully fended off a challenge from another Saenuri heavyweight, former Seoul mayor Oh Se-hoon, confounding opinion polls from before the vote that had suggested Oh would win. Prior to the 2016 election, Chung had criticized the Minjoo leadership for failing to nominate enough women and minority candidates. In December 2019, he was nominated the second prime minister of the Moon Jae-in government. He took office as the 46th Prime Minister on 14 January 2020.

== Election results ==
Year	Elections	Constituency	Political party	Votes (%)	Results
1996	15th National Assembly General Election	Jinan–Muju–Jangsu (North Jeolla)	NCNP	36,176 (68.86%)	Won
2000	16th National Assembly General Election	Jinan–Muju–Jangsu (North Jeolla)	MDP	34,165 (65.14%)	Won
2004	17th National Assembly General Election	Jinan–Muju–Jangsu-Imsil (North Jeolla)	Uri	45,475 (78.08%)	Won
2008	18th National Assembly General Election	Jinan–Muju–Jangsu-Imsil (North Jeolla)	UDP	35,566 (74.00%)	Won
2012	19th National Assembly General Election	Jongno (Seoul)	DUP	41,732 (52.26%)	Won
2016	20th National Assembly General Election	Jongno (Seoul)	Democratic	44,342 (52.56%)	Won

== Trivia ==
His nickname is the 'Bacteriaman (Baikinman, 세균맨)', so he received a Baikinman doll. Because his name, 세균 (世均, Sye-kyun or Segyun), is pronounced the same as 세균 (細菌, segyun), which means bacteria.

His religious affiliation is Protestant.

National Assembly of the Republic of Korea
Preceded by Hwang In-sung	Member of the National Assembly from Jinan–Muju– Jangsu (North Jeolla); 30 May 1996–29 May 2004	Succeeded by Himself (Jinan–Muju–Jangsu–Imsil, North Jeolla)
Preceded by Kim Tae-shik (Wanju–Imsil, North Jeolla); Himself (Jinan–Muju–Jangsu, North Jeolla)	Member of the National Assembly from Jinan–Muju–Jangsu–Imsil (North Jeolla); 30 May 2004–29 May 2012	Succeeded by Park Min-soo
Preceded by Park Jin	Member of the National Assembly from Jongno (Seoul); 30 May 2012–29 May 2020	Succeeded by Lee Nak-yon
Political offices
Preceded by Lee Hee-beom	Minister of Commerce, Industry and Energy; 9 February 2006–3 January 2007	Succeeded by Kim Young-joo
Preceded by Chung Eui-hwa	Speaker of the National Assembly of South Korea; 9 June 2016–29 May 2018	Succeeded by Moon Hee-sang
Preceded by Lee Nak-yon	Prime Minister of South Korea; 14 January 2020–16 April 2021	Succeeded by Hong Nam-ki (Acting); Kim Boo-kyum
Party political offices
Preceded by Chun Jung-bae	Floor Leader of the Uri Party; 24 January 2005–23 January 2006	Succeeded by Kim Han-gil
Preceded by Moon Hee-sang	Interim Chairman of the Uri Party; 29 October 2005–3 January 2006	Succeeded by Yoo Jae-geon (Interim)
Preceded by Kim Geun-tae	Chairman of the Uri Party; 14 February 2007–18 August 2007	Succeeded by Office bolished
Preceded by Sohn Hak-kyu, Park Sang-chun (Co–Chairman United Democratic Party)	Chairman of the Democratic Party; 7 July 2008–2 August 2010	Succeeded by Park Jie-won (Acting); Sohn Hak-kyu
