= 2019 South Korean National Assembly attack =

2019 attack on a legislature

- Part of 2018–2019 South Korean protests and Impeachment of Park Geun-hye
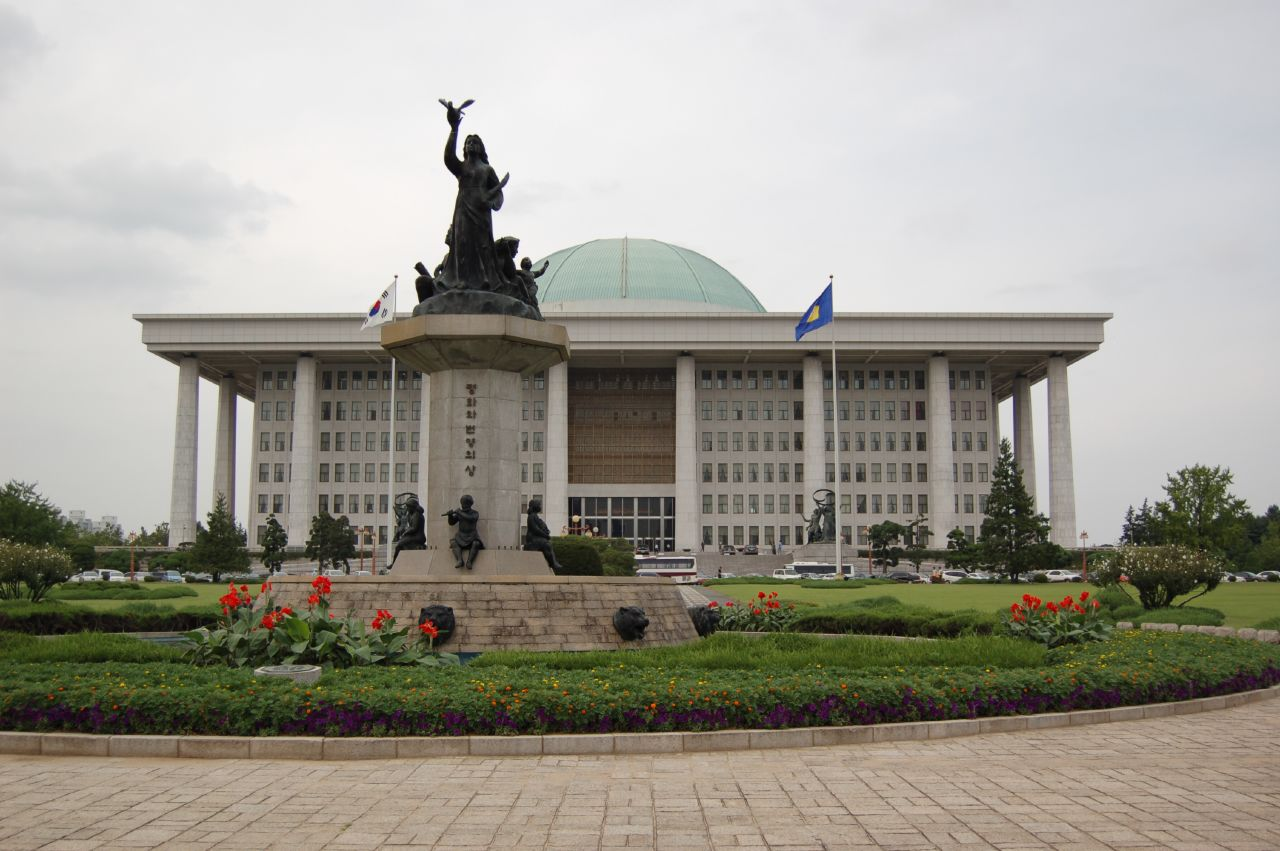
- National Assembly Proceeding Hall in 2006
- Date: 16 December 2019
- Location: National Assembly Proceeding Hall, Seoul, South Korea

The 2019 South Korean National Assembly attack occurred on 16 December 2019, when supporters of the Liberty Korea Party, Our Republican Party, and Taegeukgi units attempted to enter the National Assembly Proceeding Hall.

== Background ==
Throughout 2019, conservative activists protested the ruling liberal Democratic Party of Korea (DPK) and the Moon Jae-in administration for multiple reasons. One was the aftermath of the impeachment of Park Geun-hye in 2017, which caused a split in the country's conservative politics between the mainstream Liberty Korea Party (LKP; formerly Saenuri Party, succeeded by the People Power Party) and the far-right Our Republican Party (2017), whose supporters, known as the "Taeguk troops" over their use of the Taegukgi, held demonstrations against her impeachment. Another was the appointment of Cho Kuk as Minister of Justice, which he resigned from in October over the Cho Min academic credentials scandal, but also because of opposition to his planned reforms that would reduce the powers of the prosecutor general, a longstanding idea in South Korean politics.

== Events ==
On 16 December 2019, the Liberty Korea Party, Korea's mainstream conservative party, held "The contest to condemn the revision of the Corruption Investigation Office for High-ranking Officials Act and the Election Act" (Korean: 공수처법·선거법 날치기 저지 규탄대회), which included provisions shifting powers from prosecutors to the police and was being voted on that day. The rally started around 11:00 that day, with members of the LKP as well as "Taegeuk squad"s in attendance. It was estimated by the police to have 6,000 participants, though LKP claimed it had 10,000 participants. LKP lawmakers criticised entry restrictions on the National Assembly building, and the main gate was opened after LKP Secretary General Rep. Park Wan-su formally complained to National Assembly Secretary General Yoo In-tae.

This prompted the protestors to storm the Assembly grounds. LKP leader Hwang Kyo-ahn, who was present at the rally, reportedly encouraged the demonstrators, saying "Your rage will impact the National Assembly ... You've already won a victory". As most of the demonstrators were in their 60s and 70s, the police initially acted with restraint to avoid injuries. However, some protestors became violent, spitting on Justice Party members, grabbing their hair and shaking them. Sul Hoon, a member of the DPK, said he was attacked. Others tried to rush the doors against the directives of LKP, partially breaking them and tussling with police.

Despite calls by the LKP and the police, the protestors refused to leave and remained on the grounds well into the evening, with arrests starting at 19:30. Speaker Moon Hee-sang scrapped the vote and denounced the rally, stating "Today, supporters of a certain group almost violated the National Assembly, something that must never happen. ... I am ashamed about the extreme political confrontation, where politicians only treat other parties as enemies and oppose everything, instead of having talks and trying to find a compromise".

Two years later, South Korean media compared the incident to the 2021 United States Capitol attack. In the American attack, however, lawmakers were not victims of direct physical violence.

== See also ==
- List of attacks on legislatures
- 2025 Seoul Western District Court riot
