= Incheon Metropolitan Council =

South Korean local government

Incheon Metropolitan Council 인천광역시의회
- 8th Incheon Metropolitan Council

Type
- Type: Unicameral

History
- Founded: 8 July 1991

Leadership
- Chairman: Heo Shik, People Power
- Vice Chairman: Lee bong-rak, People Power
- Vice Chairman: Park Jong-hyeok, Democratic

Structure
- Seats: 40
- Political groups: People Power (26) Democratic (14)
- Length of term: 4 years

Elections
- Voting system: Parallel voting: First-past-the-post (36 seats); Party-list proportional representation (4 seats)
- Last election: 1 June 2022

Website
- Incheon Metropolitan Council (Korean); Incheon Metropolitan Council (English)

- Incheon Metropolitan Council
- Hangul: 인천광역시의회
- Hanja: 仁川廣域市議會
- RR: Incheon-gwangyeoksi uihoe
- MR: Inch'ŏn-gwangyŏksi ŭihoe

The Incheon Metropolitan Council (Korean: 인천광역시의회) is the local council of Incheon.

There are a total of 40 members, with 36 members elected in the First-past-the-post voting system and 4 members elected in Party-list proportional representation.

== Current composition ==
Political party	Seats
People Power	26
Democratic	14
Total	40

The Incheon Metropolitan Council has no regulations on the negotiation group.

== Organization ==
The structure of Council consists of:

- Chairman
- Two Vice-chairmen
- Standing Committees
  - Council Operation Committee
  - Planning and Administration Committee
  - Culture and Welfare Committee
  - Industrial Committee
  - Construction and Transportation Committee
  - Educational Committee
- Special Committees
  - Special Committee for Budget & Accounts
  - Special Committee on Ethics

== Recent election results ==
=== 2018 ===
Summary of the 13 June 2018 Incheon Metropolitan Council election results
Party	Constituency				Party list				Total seats	
Party	Votes	%	Seats	±	Votes	%	Seats	±	Seats	±
Democratic Party of Korea	847,939	64.64	32	▲22	733,691	55.27	2	0	34	▲22
Liberty Korea Party	413,517	31.52	1	▼20	350,909	26.43	1	▼1	2	▼21
Justice Party	15,330	1.17	0	0	122,539	9.23	1	▲1	1	▲1
Bareunmirae Party	27,993	2.14	0	new	88,093	6.63	0	new	0	new
Party for Democracy and Peace	—				8,909	0.67	0	new	0	new
Green Party Korea	—				7,900	0.59	0	0	0	0
Minjung Party	—				5,645	0.42	0	new	0	new
Labor Party	2,534	0.19	0	0	4,979	0.37	0	0	0	0
Korean Patriots' Party	—				4,566	0.34	0	new	0	new
Independents	4,507	0.34	0	0	—				0	0
Total	1,311,820	100.00	33	–	1,327,231	100.00	4	–	37	–
