= Korea JoongAng Daily =

South Korean English-language daily newspaper

Coordinates: 37.5615°N 126.971°E

- Type: Daily newspaper
- Format: Print, online
- Owner: JoongAng Ilbo
- Founded: October 17, 2000
- Language: English
- Country: South Korea
- Website: www.koreajoongangdaily.com

Korea JoongAng Daily (Korean: 코리아중앙데일리) is the English edition of the South Korean national daily newspaper JoongAng Ilbo. The newspaper was first published on October 17, 2000, as JoongAng Ilbo English Edition. It mainly carries news and feature stories by staff reporters, and some stories translated from the Korean language newspaper.

== Overview ==
Korea JoongAng Daily is one of the three main English newspapers in South Korea along with The Korea Times and The Korea Herald. The newspaper is published with a daily edition of The New York Times and it is located within the main offices of the JoongAng Ilbo in Sangam-dong, Mapo-gu, Seoul.

== See also ==
- List of newspapers in South Korea
