= The Kookje Daily News =

South Korean local newspaper

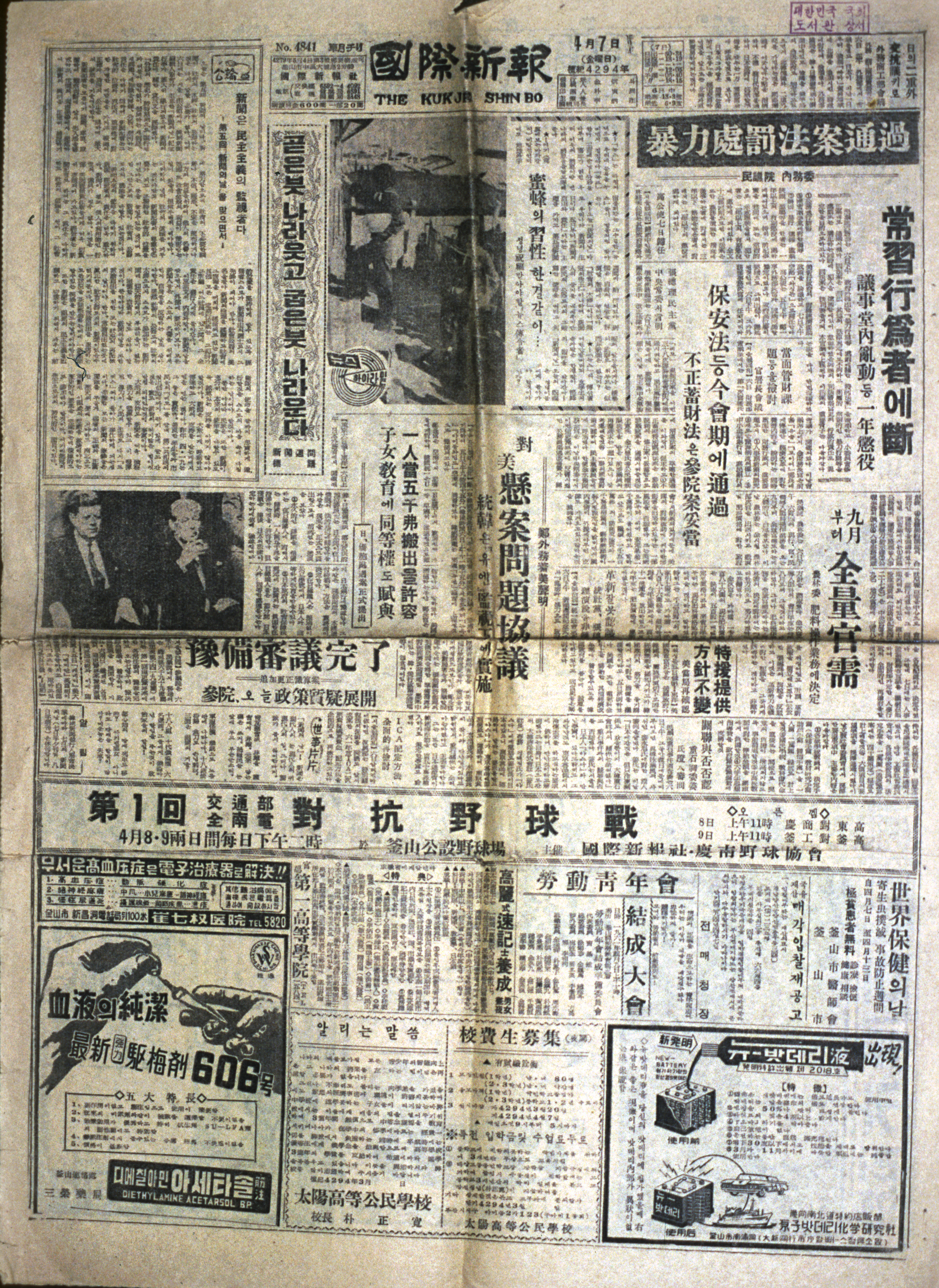
- April 7, 1961 version of Kukje Sinbo
- Founded: September 1, 1947
- Ceased publication: November 30, 1980
- Relaunched: February 1, 1989
- Language: Korean
- City: Busan
- Country: South Korea
- Website: www.kookje.co.kr

The Kookje Daily News (Korean: 국제신문; Hanja: 國際新聞) is a Korean-language newspaper based in Busan, South Korea. It was established on September 1, 1947, under a different name. It changed names in 1950, and received its current name on June 1, 1977. On November 30, 1980, the newspaper was closed and made to merge into Busan Ilbo under a presidential order that mandated press consolidation. It reopened on February 1, 1989. According to a 2010 report, of local newspapers, it had the third largest circulation in the country, behind Busan Ilbo and Maeil Sinmun.

== See also ==
- List of newspapers in South Korea
