= Taegukgi rallies =

Ongoing rallies in South Korea

Taegeukgi rallies
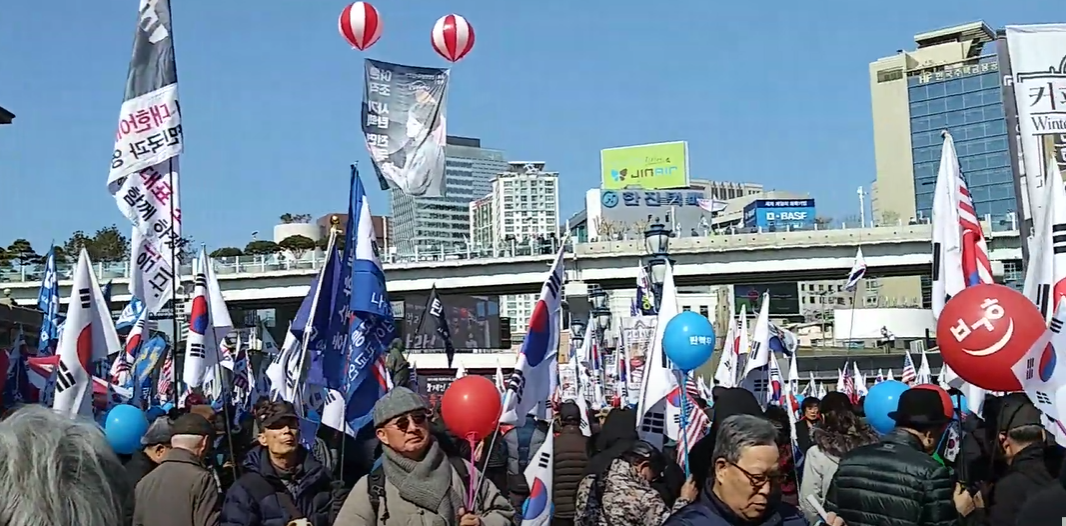
- Date: October 31, 2016 – present (9 years, 11 months, 4 weeks and 1 day)
- Location: South Korea; All regions and other countries
- Caused by: 2016–2017 South Korean protests, Impeachment of Park Geun-hye
- Goals: Objections to the impeachment of Park Geun-hye and 2016–2017 South Korean protests, dismissal and rejection of Constitutional Court of Korea, invalidation of impeachment citation by the Constitutional Court, Park Geun-hye President Lottery, Park's release, National Assembly dissolution
- Result: Mountain Jae-in Presidential Movement

Parties
(South Korea) Pro-Park protesters	Government of South Korea: Blue House; National Police Agency

Lead figures
No known organized leadership	Park Geun-hye (~2016.12.9); Hwang Gyo-an (2016.12.9~2017.5.10); Moon Jae-in (2017.5.10~); Lee Cheol-seong

Number
Sep 12 2016; 1,300 (Estimated by the organiser); 700 (Police estimate); Dec 3 2016; 1,500 (Police estimate); 15,000 (Estimated by the organiser); Jan 7 2017; 1,020,000 (Estimated by the organiser); 37,000 (Police estimate); Feb 4 2017; 1,300,000 (Estimated by the organiser); Undisclosed (Police estimate); Mar 1 2017; 5,000,000; Undisclosed (Police estimate); Apr 1 2017; 700,000 (Estimated by the organiser); Undisclosed (Police estimate); Apr 8 2017; 5,000,000 (Estimated by the organiser); Undisclosed (Police estimate) Cumulative number of attendees Police estimate: 159,600 Estimated by the organiser: 43,551,300	Nov 12 2016; 25,000 police officers Dec 3 2016; 30,000 Police; Jan 7 2017; 14,720; Feb 4 2017; 14,600; Mar 1 2017; 16,000; Mar 4 2017; 15,900; Mar 18 2017; 11,000; Mar 25 2017; 12,300 Cumulative number of attendees 370,560

Casualties
- Deaths: 4 people

The Taegeukgi rallies (Korean: 태극기 집회; Hanja: 太極旗集會), named for the flag Taegeukgi and also known as the Pro-Park rallies (친박집회), are ongoing rallies that initially started as a series of counter-candlelight rallies supporting the former president of South Korea Park Geun-hye in 2016 but now continuing with the aim of releasing Park. The Taegeukgi protestors or the Taegeukgi crowds (태극기 부대) got their names because they vehemently swung or wore South Korean flag (the Taegeukgi) during rallies.

On October 26, 2016, the first candlelight protest was held, demanding Park to step down from office. Since then, an estimated 18 million protesters over the course of 6 months gathered in Gwanghwamun Plaza to demand the resignation and impeachment of former president Park. The demonstrations continued until Park was dismissed from presidency in March 2017, even after the Constitutional Court confirmed the National Assembly's call for impeachment. Public anger centered on Park's role in political corruption regarding her personal acquaintance, Choi Soon-sil, and her role in unlawfully intervening with state affairs and coercing conglomerates to contribute large sums of money to Choi's own foundation.

Pro-Park advocates, also known as 'silver patriots' representing an older generation, believed anti-Park forces were the pro-North Korean sympathizers and manipulated by biased media. To them, what they were doing was for the protection of Jayuminjujuui (자유민주주의; 自由民主主義; lit. '"liberal democracy" or "free and democracy"') that they think they had contributed to rescue from direct communist threats in the past. The Financial Times compared them to the 2021 United States Capitol attack.

== Controversies ==
=== Conservatism ===
The Taegeukgi protests have been remarked as the first massive political assembly by the conservative camp after the democratization of South Korea.

Taegeukgi crowds do not support Park's policy or political vision.

In the 2012 South Korean presidential election, Park won with a majority 51.55% of votes. Park's party, the Liberty Korea Party, had leaned toward the conservative end of the political spectrum so this attracted many conservative voters. However, when Park's change in political corruption was uncovered, 85% of Korean citizens agreed to impeach her from the presidency. In addition to this, a large number of conservatives joined the pro-impeachment rallies for a long period of time, which proved that not only the liberals, but also a majority of conservative supporters of Park turned against her.

Academic Chae jangsoo analyzes that Park is considered among Taegeukgi protestors as a projection of the past that is positively perceived by the Taegeukgi protestors themselves. Most of the key participants of the rallies were the generation that played a key role during the time of industrialization and high economic development of South Korea under the former dictator Park Chung Hee.

=== Taegeukgi and other flags ===
From demonstrations against Japanese imperial rule to the democratization movement in 1987, waving Taegeukgi elicited patriotism and strong resistance to unjust persecution. However, as Taegeukgi protestors began to vehemently swing Taegeukgi, it is more and more becoming a symbol for the extreme right-wing activism.

In the 1970s, Park Chung Hee, a former dictator of South Korea as well as the father of Park Geun-hye, gained a number of advocates through modernization of South Korea. When Jung-hee took power through a military coup, he used Taegeukgi to legitimize his dictatorship and to a right-wing ideology. Chung-hee treated all the other dissenting voices of his policy as pro-communism and that were to be eradicated in the political arena. One thing Chung-hee actively propagated was "the Reds" (빨갱이) which refers to an expression of hatred toward North Korean communism. Chung-hee also exploited this notion to oppress any political critiques.

The Flag of the United States or pro-Trump slogans were also rampant during the rallies. This is because Taegeukgi crowds have faith that the US's military intervention prevented communism to override the South during the Korean War. The US flags therefore symbolize more than an ally of South Korea. To Taegeukgi protestors, the US is expected to be hawk-eyed against left-wing forces and any other pro-North Korea sympathizers.

== Participation ==
=== Number of protestors ===
On March 1st Movement Day, the Taegeukgi rallies were held. The main organizer of Taegeukgi protests, National Rebellion Movement Headquarters to Dismiss Presidential Impeachment (대통령탄핵기각을위한국민총궐기운동본부; in short 탄기국), reported the 15th anti-impeachment demonstration participation was over 5,000,000. This estimate had been criticized to be absurd because Seoul's population is 9,904,312 (2015), Busan has population of around 3,500,000, Denmark has population of 5,600,000, and Norway has a population of 5,200,000.

The issue of estimating participants emerged on January 13, when the Seoul Metropolitan Police Agency announced not to release estimated number of participants. The police had released an estimated number of participants, but as protests with conflicting interests are held simultaneously and the participation numbers have had aroused confusion, police publicly reported not to count the numbers.

Police operated a security force for safety and prevention of unexpected collisions at the protest site. The purpose of counting the number was an essential part to approximate numbers of tactical units to be dispatched. Police used the Fermi method. The Fermi method is estimating the number of people per area with an assumption that 5–6 people can fit in 3.3 square meters (1 plung). As such, the police estimate the number of people according to their internal needs, so strictly speaking, it is not the 'official announcement' of the estimated number of people. The size of the gathering is often a public concern, so the media has only made its own estimates available to the public.

=== Paid participants ===
The broadcasting network JTBC, based on the testimony of participants and leaders of pro-Park groups, reported on January 26 that pro-Park Taegeukgi crowds were paying people to attend rallies so as to inflate the number of participants. General members of the Korea Parent Federation (Korean: 대한민국 어버이연합) could receive KR₩20,000 (US$18), and the pay was sometimes raised to ₩60,000 ($53). Some people in financial difficulties, including the homeless, could be paid ₩50,000 ($44) if they took a shower and tidied their appearance. Any young women with babies could receive ₩150,000 ($133).

== See also ==
- 2019 South Korean National Assembly attack
