= Kyosu Shinmun =

South Korean daily newspaper

- Type: Daily Newspaper
- Format: Print, online
- Founded: April 15, 1992; 34 years ago
- Language: Korean
- Website: http://www.kyosu.net/

The Kyosu Shinmun (Korean: 교수신문; Hanja: 敎授新聞; lit. 'Professors' Newspaper') is a newspaper in South Korea with a circulation of 65,000. The Kyosu Shinmun was founded on April 15, 1992.

Since 2002, the newspaper has held an annual 'Idiom of the Year' (올해의 사자성어) survey, intending to find a four-character idiom representative of that year.
