= NewsPim =

South Korean news company

NewsPim (Korean: 뉴스핌) or Newspim is a news and media company founded in April, 2003. The company has two economic newspapers, NewsPim and Anda, the latter of which was first published in July 2016. Its director is Byeongbok Min (민병복).

The company is one of the news sources for Factiva, and has signed a strategic alliance deal with Koscom.

== See also ==
- List of newspapers in South Korea
