= Moon Hee-sang =

South Korean politician (born 1945)

The Right Honourable Moon Hee-sang
- 문희상
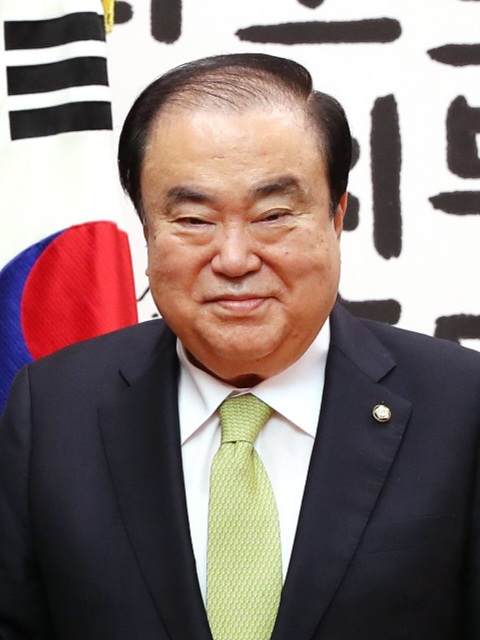

Speaker of the National Assembly
- In office 13 July 2018 – 29 May 2020
- President: Moon Jae-in
- Deputy: Lee Ju-young; Joo Seung-yong
- Preceded by: Chung Sye-kyun
- Succeeded by: Park Byeong-seug

Leader of the New Politics Alliance for Democracy Interim
- In office 28 September 2014 – 9 February 2015
- Preceded by: Kim Han-gil, Ahn Cheol-soo (Co-leader); Park Young-sun (ERC)
- Succeeded by: Moon Jae-in

Leader of the Democratic Party Interim
- In office 9 January 2013 – 4 May 2013
- Preceded by: Lee Hae-chan; Moon Jae-in (acting); Park Ki-choon (Interim)
- Succeeded by: Kim Han-gil

Leader of the Uri Party
- In office 2 April 2005 – 28 October 2005
- Preceded by: Lee Boo-Young; Lim Chae-jung (Interim)
- Succeeded by: Chung Sye-kyun (Interim); Yoo Jae-geon (Interim); Chung Dong-young

Member of the National Assembly
- In office 30 May 2004 – 29 May 2020
- Preceded by: Hong Moon-jong (Uijeongbu, Gyeonggi)
- Succeeded by: Oh Young-hwan
- Constituency: Uijeongbu A (Gyeonggi)
- In office 30 May 2000 – 7 March 2003
- Preceded by: Hong Moon-jong
- Succeeded by: Hong Moon-jong
- Constituency: Uijeongbu (Gyeonggi)
- In office 30 May 1992 – 29 May 1996
- Preceded by: Kim Moon-won
- Succeeded by: Hong Moon-jong
- Constituency: Uijeongbu (Gyeonggi)

Chief of Staff to the President
- In office 25 February 2003 – 13 July 2004
- President: Roh Moo-hyun
- Preceded by: Park Jie-won
- Succeeded by: Kim Woo-shik

Personal details
- Born: 3 March 1945 (age 81) Yangju, Keiki Province, Korea, Empire of Japan
- Party: Democratic
- Education: Seoul National University

Military service
- Allegiance: South Korea
- Branch/service: Republic of Korea Navy
- Rank: lieutenant

Korean name
- Hangul: 문희상
- Hanja: 文喜相
- RR: Mun Huisang
- MR: Mun Hŭisang

Moon Hee-sang (Korean: 문희상; born 3 March 1945) is a South Korean politician. He has a bachelor's degree in law from Seoul National University. He is a member of the National Assembly, and was the interim leader of the New Politics Alliance for Democracy from 2014 to 2015.

On 13 July 2018, he was elected as the new Speaker of the National Assembly.

== Election results ==
Year	Elections	Constituency	Political party	Votes (%)	Results
1988	13th National Assembly General Election	Uijeongbu (Gyeonggi)	PDP	22,492 (27.50%)	Defeated (3rd)
1992	14th National Assembly General Election	Uijeongbu (Gyeonggi)	DP	40,171 (38.66%)	Won
1996	15th National Assembly General Election	Uijeongbu (Gyeonggi)	NCNP	37,490 (33.01%)	Defeated (2nd)
2000	16th National Assembly General Election	Uijeongbu (Gyeonggi)	MDP	59,722 (45.76%)	Won
2004	17th National Assembly General Election	Uijeongbu A (Gyeonggi)	Uri	42,823 (52.12%)	Won
2008	18th National Assembly General Election	Uijeongbu A (Gyeonggi)	UDP	32,211 (47.50%)	Won
2012	19th National Assembly General Election	Uijeongbu A (Gyeonggi)	DUP	39,252 (47.02%)	Won
2016	20th National Assembly General Election	Uijeongbu A (Gyeonggi)	Democratic	38,739 (42.84%)	Won

Political offices
Preceded by Chung Sye-kyun	Speaker of the National Assembly of South Korea; 13 July 2018–29 May 2020	Succeeded by Park Byeong-seug
Preceded by Lee Yong-hee; Lee Sang-deuk	Deputy Speaker of the National Assembly; Serving with Lee Yun-seong; 16 July 2008–29 May 2010	Succeeded by Chung Ui-hwa; Hong Jae-hyung
Preceded by Park Jie-won	Chief of Staff to the President; 25 February 2003–13 February 2004	Succeeded by Kim Woo-sik
National Assembly of the Republic of Korea
Preceded by Kim Moon-won	Member of the National Assembly from Uijeongbu (Gyeonggi); 30 May 1992–29 May 1996	Succeeded by Hong Moon-jong
Preceded by Hong Moon-jong	Member of the National Assembly from Uijeongbu (Gyeonggi); 30 May 2000–7 March 2003	Succeeded by Hong Moon-jong
Preceded by Hong Moon-jong (Uijeongbu, Gyeonggi)	Member of the National Assembly from Uijeongbu A (Gyeonggi); 30 May 2004–29 May 2020	Succeeded by Oh Young-hwan
Party political offices
Preceded by Lee Boo-young; Lim Chae-jung (Interim)	Chairman of the Uri Party; 2 April 2005–28 October 2005	Succeeded by Chung Sye-kyun (Interim); Yoo Jae-geon (Interim); Chung Dong-young
Preceded by Park Ki-choon (Interim)	Interim Leader of the Democratic United Party; 9 January 2013–4 May 2013	Succeeded by Kim Han-gil (Leader of the Democratic Party)
Preceded by Park Young-sun (ERC)	Interim Leader of the New Politics Alliance for Democracy; 17 September 2014–8 February 2015	Succeeded by Moon Jae-in
