= Daegu Shinmun =

South Korean local daily newspaper

- Type: Daily newspaper
- Format: Print, online
- Owner: Daegu Shinmun
- Founded: 1970
- Language: Korean
- Website: https://www.idaegu.co.kr/

Korean name
- Hangul: 대구신문
- Hanja: 大邱新聞
- RR: Daegu sinmun
- MR: Taegu sinmun

The Daegu Shinmun (Korean: 대구신문) is a local daily newspaper in Daegu, South Korea. Like most of the country's newspapers, it publishes exclusively in Korean. The headquarters are located in Dongin-dong, Jung-gu, above the Sincheon. The paper is distributed throughout Daegu and the surrounding province of Gyeongsangbuk-do, and covers national and regional events as well as local affairs.

== See also ==
- List of newspapers
