= Naeil Shinmun =

South Korean newspaper

Naeil Shinmun (Korean: 내일신문; lit. Tomorrow Newspaper) is an online and print Korean-language newspaper published from Seoul, South Korea. It was first published in Bucheon on October 9, 1993, as a weekly paper. It became a daily paper in 2000.
