= Liberty Unification Party =

2020 political party in South Korea

Liberty Unification Party 자유통일당
- Abbreviation: LUP
- President: Kim Moon-soo
- Founded: 31 January 2020
- Registered: 13 February 2020
- Dissolved: 3 March 2020
- Split from: New National Participation Party
- Succeeded by: Liberty Republican Party
- Headquarters: Yongsan Building, 23, Gukhoe-daero 70-gil, Yeongdeungpo District, Seoul
- Ideology: Nationalism (South Korea); Christian fundamentalism
- Political position: Far-right
- Colours: Red; Blue

Website
- lup.kr

The Liberty Unification Party (Korean: 자유통일당) was a conservative political party in South Korea.

== History ==
The party was originally formed as the Korea Party (Proportional) (Korean: 비례한국당) by Choi In-shik, who exited from the United Korea Party (now as the New National Participation Party). It soon changed the name to Party for National Revolution (국민혁명당) after the National Election Commission did not allow all political parties from using the term "(Proportional)" to their names.

On 29 January 2020, Kim Moon-soo, the former Governor of Gyeonggi, left from the Liberty Korea Party and joined this party. 2 days later, the party was officially formed and elected Kim as its President. Jeon Kwang-hoon, a pastor, did not officially join but showed his intention to be allied with the party.

Koh Young-il, the President of the Christian Liberal Party, showed his intention to form an electoral alliance with this party as a decoy list.

On 20 February, the party agreed to be merged with the Our Republican Party before the election.
