= Our Republican Party (2017) =

2017–2020 political party in South Korea

Our Republican Party 우리공화당
- Co-Leader: Cho Won-jin
- Floor Leader: vacant
- Secretary General: Oh Kyung-hoon
- Chairman of the Policy Planning Committee: In Ji-yeon (interim)
- Founded: 8 July 2017 (as Korean Patriots' Party); 24 June 2019 (as Our Republican Party)
- Dissolved: 3 March 2020
- Split from: New Saenuri Party
- Succeeded by: Liberty Republican Party
- Ideology: South Korean nationalism Social conservatism Anti-LGBT
- Political position: Far-right

Website
- http://orp.or.kr/main/main.php

- Our Republican Party
- Hangul: 우리공화당
- Hanja: 우리共和黨
- RR: Uri gonghwadang
- MR: Uri konghwadang

The Our Republican Party (Korean: 우리공화당), formerly the Korean Patriots' Party (대한애국당), was a far-right political party in South Korea known primarily for its pro-Park Geun-hye stance. It was formed following a split within the New Saenuri Party. The party strongly supported former president Park Geun-hye.

In June 2019, the party elevated Hong Moon-jong, a National Assembly member who left the Liberty Korea Party, as its leader along with incumbent Cho Won-jin. Originally, the party planned to change its name as New Republican Party (신공화당), but faced a legal issue. On 24 June, the party changed the name to Our Republican Party. The party claimed that the new name came from Park Geun-hye herself.

In March 2020, the party merged with the Liberty Unification Party to form the Liberty Republican Party.

== Election results ==
Election	Metropolitan mayor/Governor	Provincial legislature	Municipal mayor	Municipal legislature	Leader
2018	Cho Won-jin	0 / 17	0 / 824	0 / 226	0 / 2,927

== See also ==
- Impeachment of Park Geun-hye
- 2019 South Korean Capitol attack
