= Cho Won-jin =

South Korean politician

- 조원진
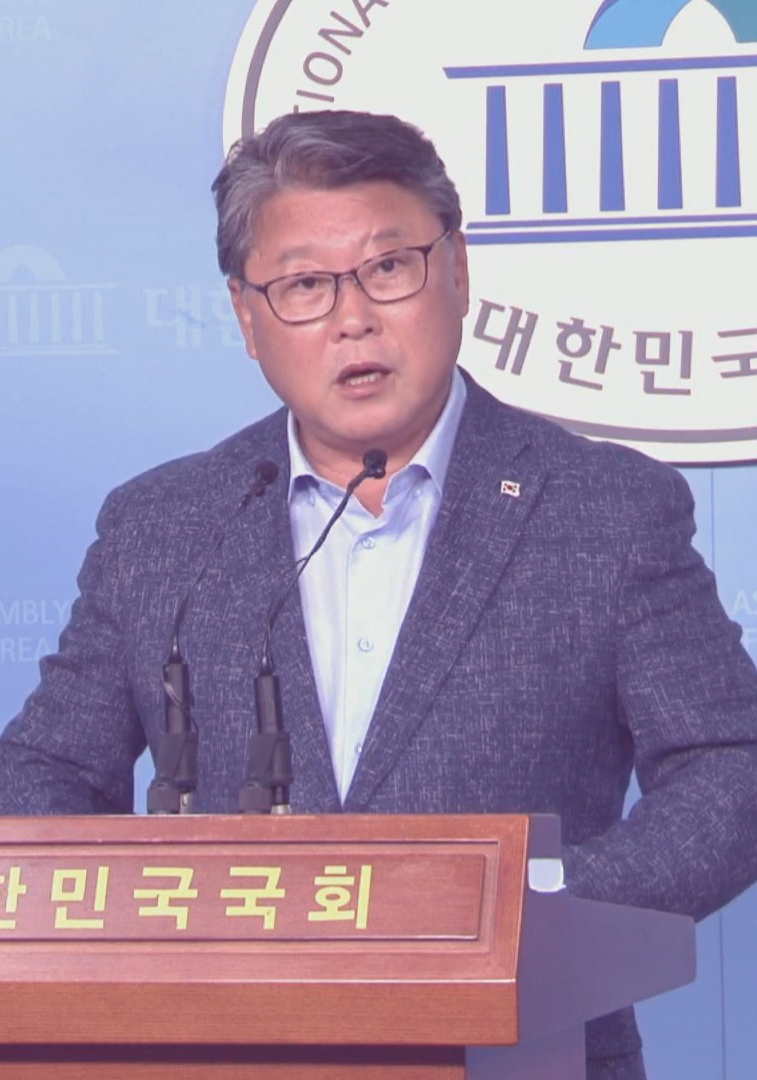

President of Our Republican Party
- Incumbent
- Assumed office 27 June 2019 Serving with Hong Moon-jong (until 10 February 2020)
- Preceded by: Himself (as the President of Korean Patriots' Party)
- Succeeded by: Party dissolved

Member of the National Assembly
- In office 30 May 2008 – 29 May 2020
- Constituency: Dalseo C (Daegu)

President of the Korean Patriots' Party
- In office 8 July 2017 – 27 June 2019
- Preceded by: Position established
- Succeeded by: Position abolished (himself as the President of Our Republic)

Personal details
- Born: 7 January 1959 (age 67)
- Party: Our Republic
- Other political affiliations: Korean Patriots' Party (2017–2019); Saenuri Party (2017); Liberty Korea Party (until 2017)
- Education: Hankuk University of Foreign Studies Yeungnam University

Korean name
- Hangul: 조원진
- Hanja: 趙源震
- RR: Jo Wonjin
- MR: Cho Wŏnjin

Cho Won-jin (born 7 January 1959) is a South Korean conservative pro-Park Geun-hye politician who served as the break-away Saenuri Party's presidential candidate in the 2017 presidential election. He had been a member of the Liberty Korea Party prior to that, representing Dalseo District, Daegu in the National Assembly since first being elected in the 2008 elections. Cho vowed to become "a patriotic president to set the Republic of Korea straight", and pledged to boost the status of the country's war heroes and "correct distortions" in public education allegedly resulting from the domination of teaching unions, traditionally leftist. He is a pro-China and supports common economic development between China and South Korea. He also supports Chinese paramount leader Xi Jinping and his anti-corruption campaign. He has also met with Xi Jinping in 2009 as a member of National Assembly. He has also previously lived and worked in China for over 15 years.

== Election results ==
Year	Elections	Constituency	Political party	Votes (%)	Results
1998	July 1998 By-election	Buk A (Daegu)	Independent	2,453 (5.01%)	Defeated (4th)
2000	16th National Assembly General Election	Buk A (Daegu)	Independent	5,526 (7.56%)	Defeated (4th)
2008	18th National Assembly General Election	Dalseo C (Daegu)	Pro-Park Alliance	26,357 (49.23%)	Won
2012	19th National Assembly General Election	Dalseo C (Daegu)	Saenuri (2012)	49,842 (74.77%)	Won
2016	20th National Assembly General Election	Dalseo C (Daegu)	Saenuri (2012)	43,817 (66.24%)	Won
2017	2017 Presidential Election	South Korea	Saenuri (2017)	42,949 (0.13%)	Defeated (6th)
2020	21st National Assembly General Election	Dalseo C (Daegu)	ORP	12,707 (15.08%)	Defeated (3rd)
2022	2022 Presidential Election	South Korea	ORP	25,972 (0.07%)	Defeated (6th)
2024	22nd National Assembly General Election	Dalseo C (Daegu)	ORP	12,492 (16.82%)	Defeated (2nd)
