= Imsil County =

Coordinates: 35°36′47″N 127°16′46″E

Imsil
- County
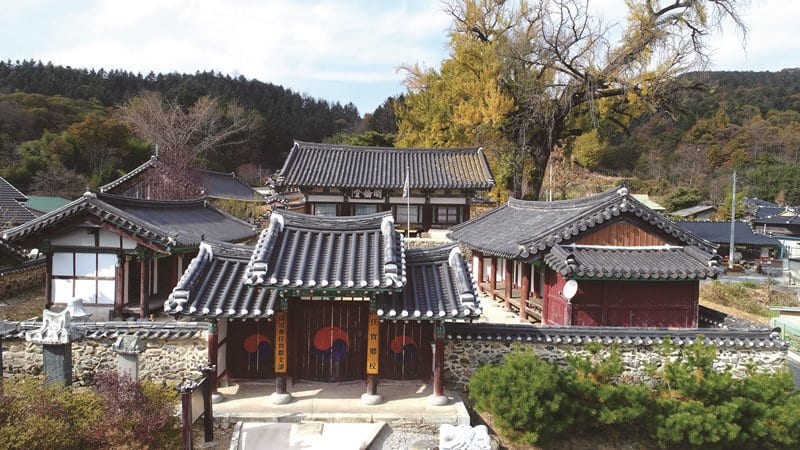
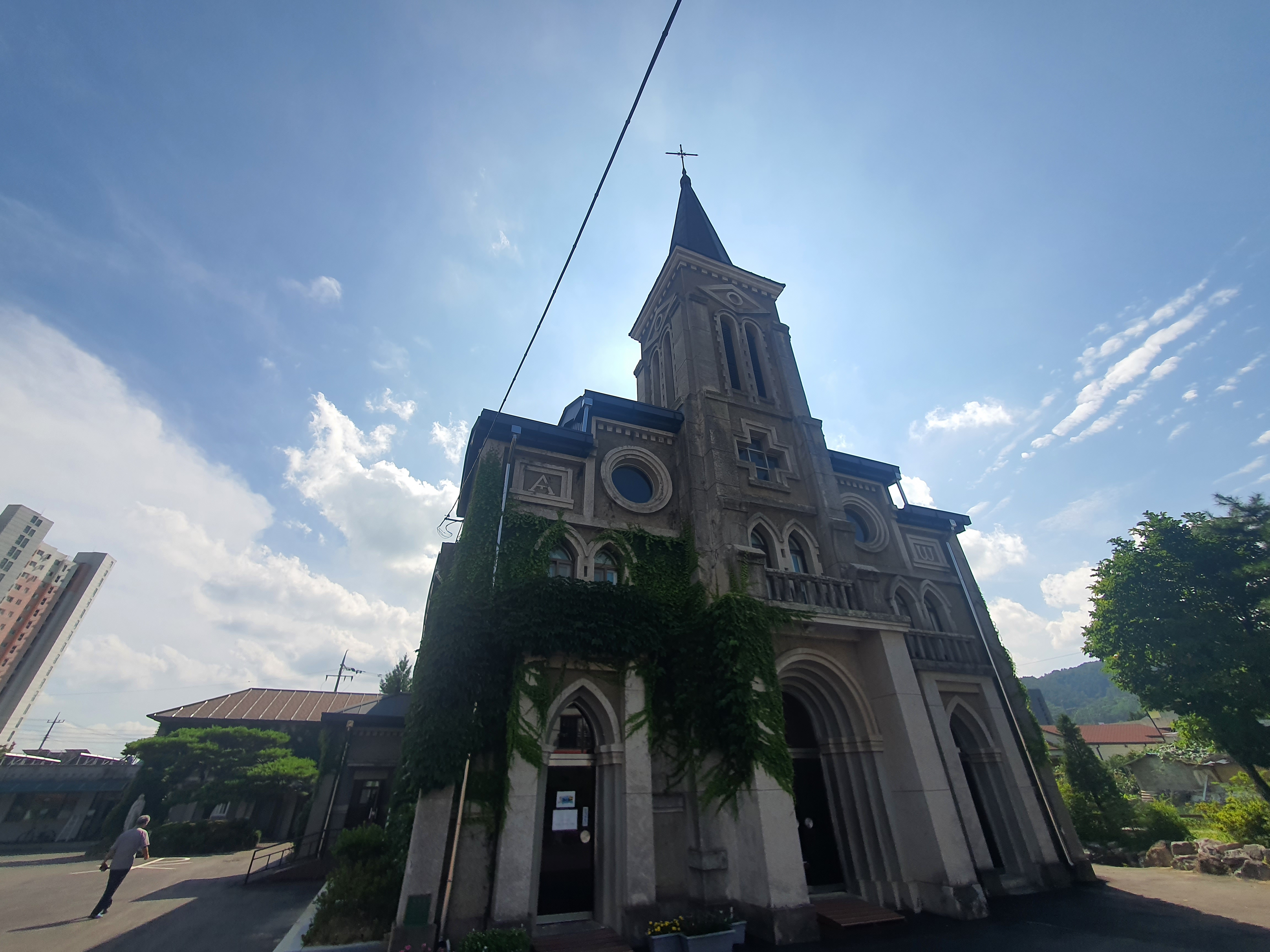
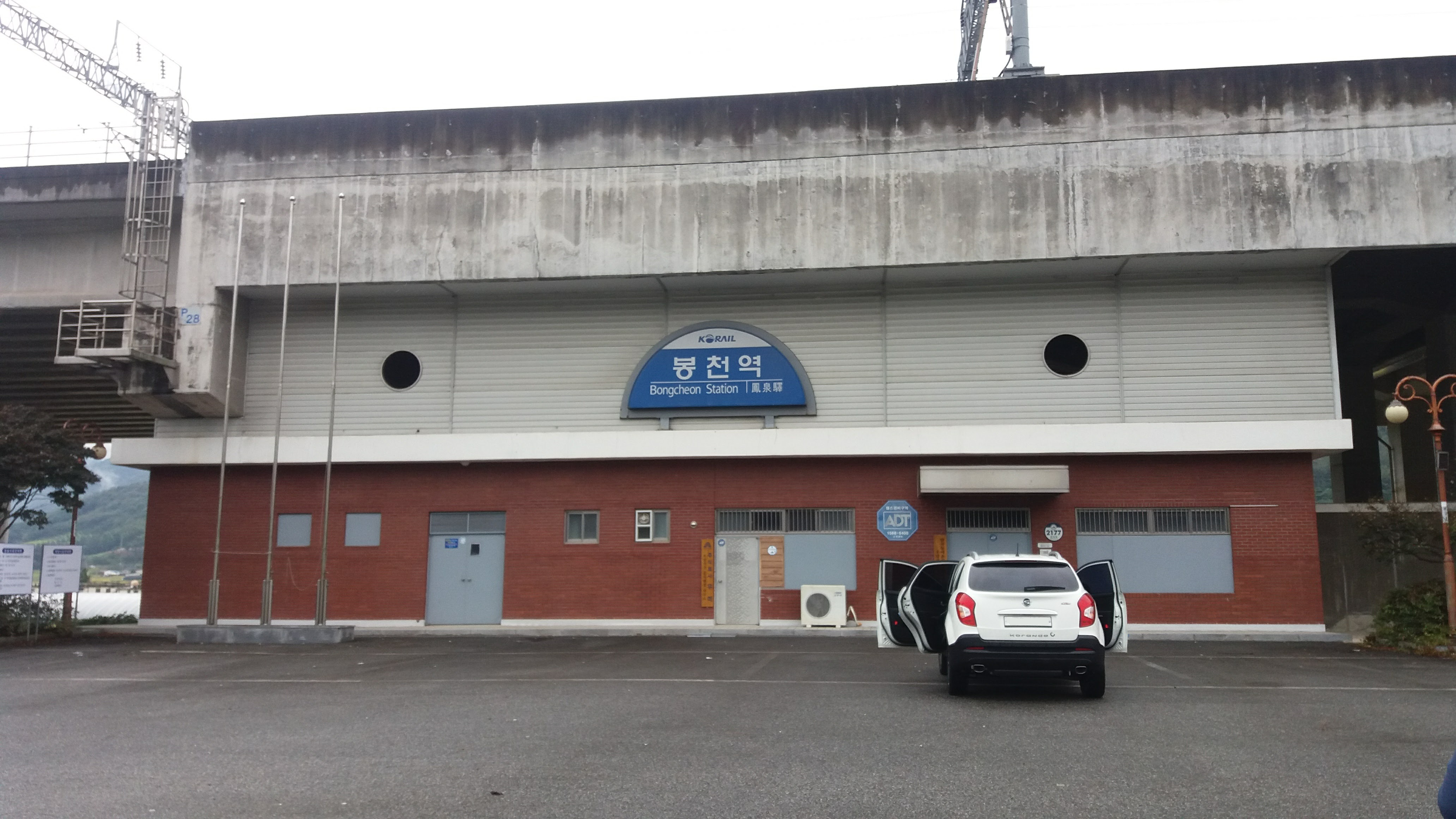
- From the left: Imsil Hyanggyo, Imsil Catherdal, Bongcheon Station

- Flag Emblem of Imsil

- Location in South Korea
- Country: South Korea
- State: Jeonbuk
- Administrative divisions: 1 eup, 11 myeon

Area
  - Total: 596.88 km^{2} (230.46 sq mi)

Population (September 2024)
  - Total: 25,693
  - Density: 45/km^{2} (120/sq mi)
  - Dialect: Jeolla

Korean name
- Hangul: 임실군
- Hanja: 任實郡
- RR: Imsil-gun
- MR: Imsil-gun

Imsil County (Korean: 임실군) is a county in North Jeolla Province, South Korea. Imsil County is a county in central South Jeolla Province, South Korea. It is an area upstream of the Seomjingang River in the Noryeongsan Mountains, and there is a basin that runs southeast to Namwon. The county office is located in Imsil-eup, and the administrative district is 11 myeon, 1eup.

It is approximately 30 minutes south of Jeonju by car or bus. Domestic Korean cheese was first produced in Imsil County. Imsil County encompasses several important towns, mountains and natural areas.

Imsil-gun has 14 elementary schools and an English center.

== History ==
=== Proto–Three Kingdoms period ===
Imsil belonged to the Mahan State, as New Wunsin State.

=== Three Kingdoms period ===
The county was Inghil-gun in Baekje.

=== Unified Silla Period ===
Imsil-gun belonged to Namwon-bu. Ingil-gun was renamed Imsil-gun in 759. The stone pagoda at Imsil Jingusaji Temple Site was also built during the Unified Silla period.

=== Today ===
The building was relocated in 2010.

== Tourism ==
=== Imsil Cheese Village ===
Imsil Cheese Village (Korean: 임실치즈테마파크) is located near the town of Imsil (within the county of Imsil). It offers vacation programs for children and tourists to learn how to make cheese.

The cheese produced there is called Imsil cheese, following the county name. Imsil cheese is the unusual mission legacy of a Catholic priest from Belgium who took the Korean name of Ji Junghwan. He arrived in the farming village of Imsil, in the mid-1950s, when the economy was still shattered from the Korean War. He started a farmers’ milk cooperative, which eventually became the Imsil Cheese Factory. The factory still exists today and produces high-quality cheese and yogurt for the Korean market.

A pizza franchise using Imsil cheese has become a widespread business in South Korea since 2004, under the name of Imsil Cheese Pizza. Nearby livestock farms produce the dairy products required for the manufacture of the cheese.

=== Okjeongho Lake ===
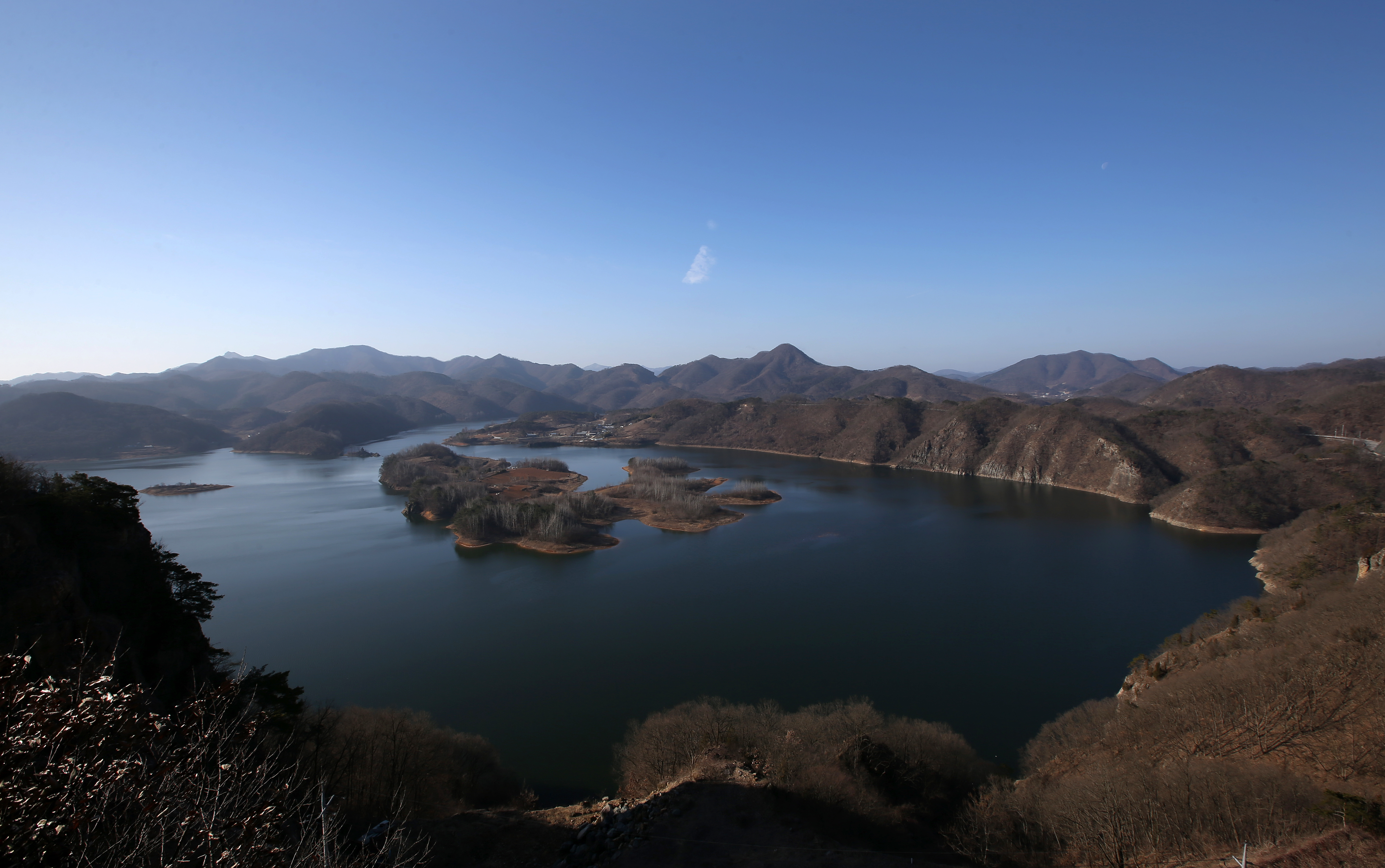
Okjeongho Lake

Okjeongho Lake (Korean: 옥정호) is an artificial lake created by the construction of the Seomjingang River Dam. There is a walking trail by the lake. In the upper reaches of the Seomjingang River, Okjeongho Lake has a large temperature difference between night and day, so fog rises.

== Education ==
Yewon Arts University is located in Imsil.

== Climate ==
Climate data for Imsil (1991–2020 normals, extremes 1970–present)
Month	Jan	Feb	Mar	Apr	May	Jun	Jul	Aug	Sep	Oct	Nov	Dec	Year
Record high °C (°F)	16.1 (61.0)	21.9 (71.4)	25.1 (77.2)	30.6 (87.1)	33.8 (92.8)	34.7 (94.5)	37.1 (98.8)	37.5 (99.5)	33.4 (92.1)	29.8 (85.6)	25.8 (78.4)	18.3 (64.9)	37.5 (99.5)
Mean daily maximum °C (°F)	3.8 (38.8)	6.5 (43.7)	12.1 (53.8)	18.7 (65.7)	23.7 (74.7)	27.1 (80.8)	29.1 (84.4)	29.8 (85.6)	26.0 (78.8)	20.6 (69.1)	13.4 (56.1)	6.0 (42.8)	18.1 (64.6)
Daily mean °C (°F)	−2.5 (27.5)	−0.3 (31.5)	4.6 (40.3)	10.7 (51.3)	16.3 (61.3)	20.8 (69.4)	24.1 (75.4)	24.4 (75.9)	19.5 (67.1)	12.5 (54.5)	6.0 (42.8)	−0.4 (31.3)	11.3 (52.3)
Mean daily minimum °C (°F)	−8.0 (17.6)	−6.2 (20.8)	−2.0 (28.4)	3.2 (37.8)	9.3 (48.7)	15.5 (59.9)	20.5 (68.9)	20.4 (68.7)	14.4 (57.9)	6.2 (43.2)	−0.1 (31.8)	−5.9 (21.4)	5.6 (42.1)
Record low °C (°F)	−24.4 (−11.9)	−21.8 (−7.2)	−13.8 (7.2)	−7.1 (19.2)	−0.8 (30.6)	4.2 (39.6)	10.6 (51.1)	8.8 (47.8)	2.6 (36.7)	−4.9 (23.2)	−17.0 (1.4)	−21.9 (−7.4)	−24.4 (−11.9)
Average precipitation mm (inches)	28.5 (1.12)	36.9 (1.45)	53.8 (2.12)	83.6 (3.29)	85.9 (3.38)	142.4 (5.61)	312.0 (12.28)	312.1 (12.29)	138.3 (5.44)	58.1 (2.29)	50.7 (2.00)	33.3 (1.31)	1,335.6 (52.58)
Average precipitation days (≥ 0.1 mm)	9.2	7.4	8.7	8.8	8.8	10.9	16.0	15.3	9.1	6.4	8.3	9.6	118.5
Average snowy days	9.9	7.2	2.6	0.4	0.0	0.0	0.0	0.0	0.0	0.2	2.5	6.7	29.5
Average relative humidity (%)	73.4	68.6	65.8	63.3	66.7	72.9	79.3	78.8	76.9	74.4	73.5	74.2	72.3
Mean monthly sunshine hours	154.3	168.8	203.1	219.8	234.2	179.9	148.5	169.0	175.1	190.7	155.7	143.5	2,142.6
Percentage possible sunshine	51.9	56.2	54.7	59.2	54.5	44.2	37.6	44.6	51.3	59.8	54.8	51.4	51.3
Source: Korea Meteorological Administration (snow and percent sunshine 1981–2010)

== Twin towns – sister cities ==
Imsil is twinned with:

- Gangseo-gu, South Korea
- Eunpyeong-gu, South Korea
- Busanjin-gu, South Korea
