= Saenuri Party (2017) =

South Korean political party

Saenuri Party 새누리당
- Leader: Chung Kwang-taek
- Founded: 24 February 2017
- Split from: Liberty Korea Party
- Ideology: Pro–Park Geun-hye; Nationalism (South Korea); Anti-communism
- Political position: Right-wing to far-right
- Colours: Red
- Slogan: The New Patriotic Party of Taegeukgi (태극기 애국신당)
- National Assembly: 0 / 300
- Metropolitan Mayors and Governors: 0 / 16

Website
- saenuri.org

Saenuri Party (Korean: 새누리당, romanized: Saenuri dang) is a conservative political party in South Korea, founded by supporters of Park Geun-hye. It opposed her impeachment.

The foundation of the new Saenuri party began in February 2017 with the establishment of a committee and submission of party formation documents to the national voting commission. In early March it was announced the new party would be named 'Saenuri'. The Liberty Korea Party had been known under this name until February 2017, during the impeachment process against Park, when it was renamed.

Regional branches were established days after the impeachment of Park on 10 March. The first, on 16 March, was in Daegu (the birthplace of Park Geun-hye), with 1500 members (own figures). On 17 March, the Seoul regional branch was founded. On 5 April, the registration with the national voting commission was concluded, and the party was officially founded. The first party leaders were Park supporters Kwon Young-hae and Jeong Kwang-taek. The Park loyalist and National Assembly member Kim Jin-tae congratulated the new party with the words: "The Liberty Korea Party and the Saenuri Party will compete for a free democracy as they are from the same roots."

On 9 April 2017, Cho Won-jin announced his exit from the Liberty Korea party, and the next day his joining of the Saenuri Party, becoming the Saenuri Party's first representative in the National Assembly. He added that some National Assembly members from the Liberty Korea party were considering a move to the Saenuri Party, and that an alliance with the Bareun Party, which had split off from the Liberty Korea Party in January, would provoke yet more members to make the switch.

== 2017 presidential election ==
When Cho Won-jin joined the Saenuri Party on 10 April 2017, he hinted at his eventual candidacy for the presidency for the "Prevention of the formation of a shady leftist administration", and postponed the final decision to 12 April.

Under Cho Won-jin, the Saenuri Party came 6th in the election, with 0.13% of the vote (42,949 votes).

== Election results ==
=== President ===
Election	Candidate	Votes	%	Result
2017	Cho Won-jin	42,949	0.13	Not elected
2022	Ok Un-ho	4,970	0.01	Not elected

=== Legislature ===
Election	Leader	Constituency				Party list				Seats		Position	Status
Election	Leader	Votes	%	Seats	+/-	Votes	%	Seats	+/-	No.	+/–	Position	Status
2020	Chung Kwang-taek	269	0.00	0 / 300	new	80,208	0.29	0 / 47	new	0 / 300	new	▲14th	Extra-parliamentary
2024	Chung Kwang-taek	—N/a				57,210	0.20	0 / 47	0	0 / 300	0	▲11th	Extra-parliamentary
