= Jangsu County =

Coordinates: 35°38′47″N 127°31′10″E

Jangsu
- County
- Panoramic view of Jangsu-eup

- Flag Emblem of Jangsu

- Location in South Korea
- Country: South Korea
- State: Jeonbuk
- Administrative divisions: 1 eup, 6 myeon

Area
  - Total: 533.64 km^{2} (206.04 sq mi)

Population (September 2024)
  - Total: 24,277
  - Density: 41/km^{2} (110/sq mi)
  - Dialect: Jeolla

Korean name
- Hangul: 장수군
- Hanja: 長水郡
- RR: Jangsu-gun
- MR: Changsu-gun

Jangsu County (Korean: 장수군) is a county in Jeonbuk State, South Korea. It is well known for Jangsu-Galbi.

== Climate ==
Climate data for Jangsu (1991–2020 normals, extremes 1988–present)
Month	Jan	Feb	Mar	Apr	May	Jun	Jul	Aug	Sep	Oct	Nov	Dec	Year
Record high °C (°F)	16.1 (61.0)	19.7 (67.5)	23.6 (74.5)	28.9 (84.0)	32.4 (90.3)	32.8 (91.0)	36.2 (97.2)	36.5 (97.7)	32.0 (89.6)	29.5 (85.1)	24.6 (76.3)	17.0 (62.6)	36.5 (97.7)
Mean daily maximum °C (°F)	3.0 (37.4)	5.8 (42.4)	11.2 (52.2)	17.8 (64.0)	22.7 (72.9)	25.9 (78.6)	27.9 (82.2)	28.6 (83.5)	24.8 (76.6)	19.6 (67.3)	12.5 (54.5)	5.3 (41.5)	17.1 (62.8)
Daily mean °C (°F)	−3.0 (26.6)	−0.8 (30.6)	4.3 (39.7)	10.5 (50.9)	16.0 (60.8)	20.1 (68.2)	23.3 (73.9)	23.4 (74.1)	18.3 (64.9)	11.6 (52.9)	5.4 (41.7)	−0.8 (30.6)	10.7 (51.3)
Mean daily minimum °C (°F)	−8.6 (16.5)	−6.6 (20.1)	−2.0 (28.4)	3.2 (37.8)	9.2 (48.6)	15.0 (59.0)	19.5 (67.1)	19.4 (66.9)	13.2 (55.8)	5.3 (41.5)	−0.6 (30.9)	−6.2 (20.8)	5.1 (41.2)
Record low °C (°F)	−25.7 (−14.3)	−25.8 (−14.4)	−13.3 (8.1)	−6.6 (20.1)	−0.7 (30.7)	4.5 (40.1)	9.1 (48.4)	10.6 (51.1)	2.1 (35.8)	−5.4 (22.3)	−12.0 (10.4)	−23.2 (−9.8)	−25.8 (−14.4)
Average precipitation mm (inches)	31.9 (1.26)	45.5 (1.79)	64.5 (2.54)	96.6 (3.80)	100.5 (3.96)	164.9 (6.49)	339.7 (13.37)	336.5 (13.25)	153.8 (6.06)	63.6 (2.50)	52.1 (2.05)	36.4 (1.43)	1,486 (58.50)
Average precipitation days (≥ 0.1 mm)	8.6	7.4	9.1	9.1	9.0	10.9	16.4	15.2	9.3	6.7	8.1	9.3	119.1
Average snowy days	10.8	8.7	4.0	0.8	0.0	0.0	0.0	0.0	0.0	0.4	2.7	7.6	35.2
Average relative humidity (%)	72.2	69.2	66.7	64.3	67.7	75.3	81.3	81.4	80.4	77.0	75.2	74.0	73.7
Mean monthly sunshine hours	155.4	169.6	201.2	213.5	229.1	177.5	139.5	153.2	157.0	179.5	152.2	143.8	2,071.5
Percentage possible sunshine	49.0	55.7	52.6	55.9	51.1	41.3	32.9	37.1	43.9	53.6	51.1	47.7	47.0
Source: Korea Meteorological Administration (snow and percent sunshine 1981–2010)

== Twin towns – sister cities ==
Jangsu is twinned with:

- Anyang, South Korea (1996)
- Hapcheon, South Korea (1999)
- Jinhae-gu, South Korea (1999)
