= Our Republican Party (2020) =

Our Republican Party 우리공화당 우리共和黨
- Leader: Cho Won-jin
- Founded: 3 March 2020
- Preceded by: Liberty Unification Party (factions); Our Republican Party
- Ideology: South Korean nationalism; Social conservatism; Anti-communism
- Political position: Far-right
- National Assembly: 0 / 300
- Municipal Councillors: 0 / 3,034

Website
- orp.or.kr

Our Republican Party (ORP; Korean: 우리공화당; Hanja: 우리共和黨; RR: Urigonghwadang) is a conservative and pro-Park Geun-hye party in South Korea. Originally founded as the Liberty Republican Party (자유공화당), it reverted to its original name shortly after Kim Moon-soo withdrew from the party.

== Election results ==
=== President ===
Election	Candidate	Votes	%	Outcome
2022	Cho Won-jin	25,972	0.08	Not elected

=== Legislature ===
The party did not secure a seat in the National Assembly in the 2024 legislative elections.

Election	Leader	Constituency				Party list				Seats		Position	Status
Election	Leader	Votes	%	Seats	+/-	Votes	%	Seats	+/-	No.	+/–	Position	Status
2020	Cho Won-jin	47,299	0.16	0 / 253	new	208,719	0.75	0 / 47	new	0 / 300	new	▲9th	Extra-parliamentary
2024	Cho Won-jin	12,814	0.04	0 / 254	0	29,895	0.11	0 / 46	0	0 / 300	0	▼15th	Extra-parliamentary

== See also ==
- Impeachment of Park Geun-hye
