= Han Sun-kyo =

South Korean politician (born 1959)

- 한선교
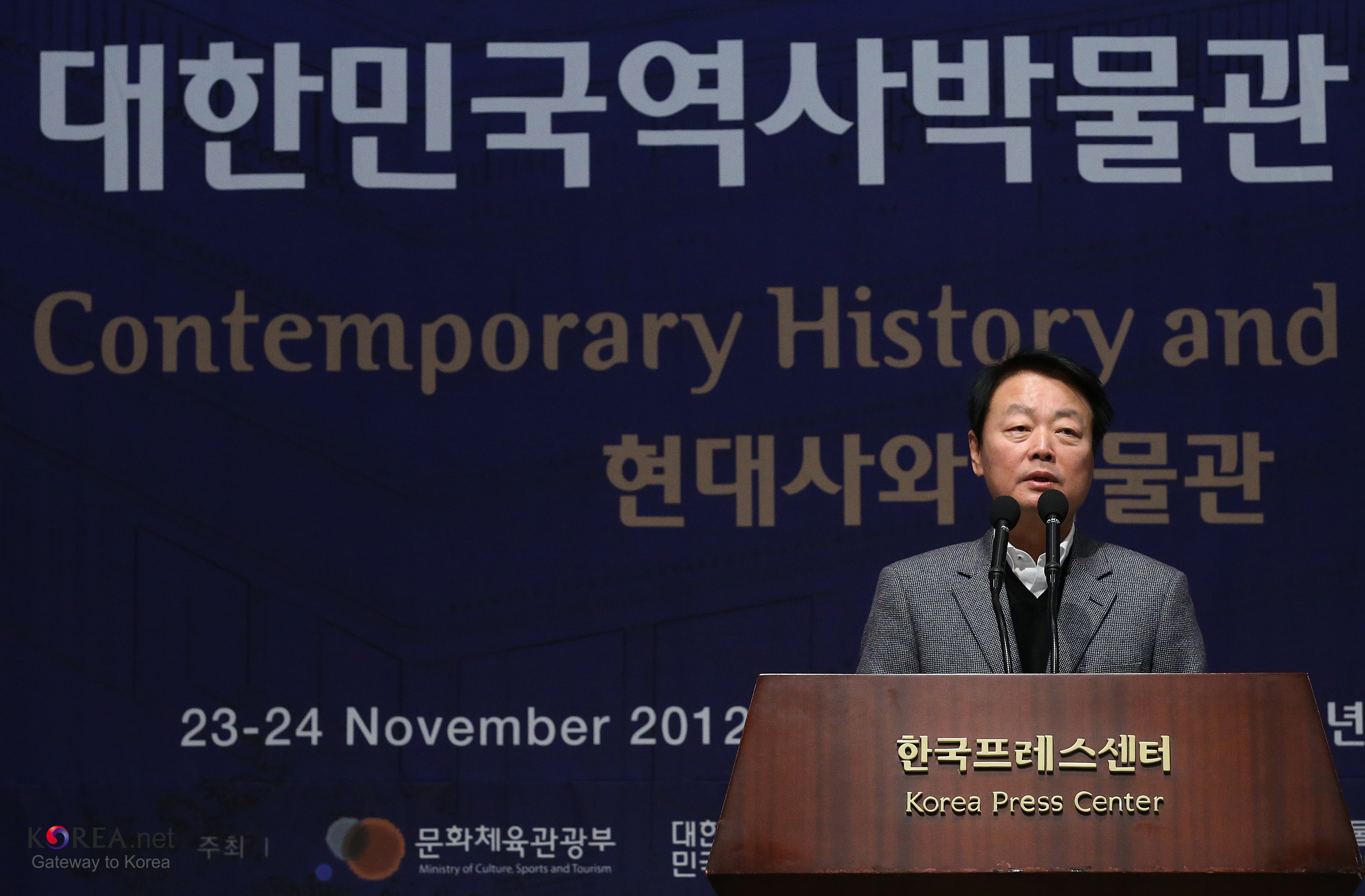
- Han Sun-kyo in 2012

President of the Future Korea Party
- In office 5 February 2020 – 19 March 2020
- Preceded by: Position established
- Succeeded by: Won Yoo-chul

Member of the National Assembly
- In office 30 May 2012 – 29 May 2020
- Preceded by: Woo Je-chang (Yongin Cheoin); Park Joon-sun (Yongin Giheung); Himself (Yongin Suji)
- Succeeded by: Jung Choun-sook
- Constituency: Yongin C (Gyeonggi)
- In office 30 May 2008 – 29 May 2012
- Preceded by: Woo Je-chang (Yongin A); Himself (Yongin B)
- Succeeded by: Lee Woo-hyun (Yongin A); Kim Min-ki (Yongin B); Himself (Yongin C)
- Constituency: Yongin Suji (Gyeonggi)
- In office 30 May 2004 – 29 May 2008
- Preceded by: Namgoong Seok (Yongin A)); Kim Yoon-shik (Yongin B)
- Succeeded by: Woo Je-chang (Yongin Cheoin); Park Joon-sun (Yongin Giheung); Himself (Yongin Suji)
- Constituency: Yongin B (Gyeonggi)

Secretary-General of the Liberty Korea Party
- In office 4 March 2019 – 17 June 2019
- Preceded by: Kim Yong-tae
- Succeeded by: Choo Kyung-ho (interim)

Chairman of the Korean Basketball League
- In office 1 September 2011 – 30 June 2014
- Preceded by: Chun Yook
- Succeeded by: Kim Young-ki

Personal details
- Born: 23 June 1959 (age 67) Seoul, South Korea
- Party: People Power
- Other political affiliations: Grand National Party (2004–2008;2008–2012); Independent (2008;2020); Saenuri Party (2012–2017); Liberty Korea Party (2017–2020); Future Korea Party (2020); United Future Party (2020)
- Spouse: Ha Ji-hyun
- Children: Han Hui-seung; Han Hui-min
- Education: Sungkyunkwan University
- Occupation: Broadcaster, politician

Han Sun-kyo (Korean: 한선교; born 23 June 1959) is a South Korean former broadcaster and politician, who was the Member of National Assembly from 2004 to 2020. He was also the President of the Future Korea Party from February to March 2020. Prior to his political career, he worked as a newsreader of MBC from 1984 to 1995. He was also the Chairman of the Korean Basketball League from 2011 to 2014.

== Early life and education ==
Han Sun-kyo was born in Seoul in 1959 as a son of Han Woong-kyo (died in 2014). He graduated from Daeil High School in 1977; he is also a colleague to the former Mayor of Seoul Oh Se-hoon, and the former State Minister for Political Affairs of the Blue House Park Hyung-joon. He received a Bachelor of Physics from Sungkyunkwan University, as well as a master's degree in political science. He wrote a thesis named "The Conditions on the Rise of A Female Head of the State : Comparison Between the United Kingdom and South Korea" in 2006.

== Career ==
Han entered to MBC in 1984 and was selected as a newsreader, in which he served till 1995 when he quitted the company and became a freelancer. He joined a 50-day strike in 1992 held by MBC trade union to against the company's pro-Democratic Liberal Party stance. While at MBC, he also worked as a basketball stadium announcer.

Han was also the 1st emcee of Good Morning from 1996 to 2004 (as a co-emcee with Chung Euna since 1999) but retired as a broadcaster in 2004 to join politics.

In 2011, he was elected as the Chairman of the Korean Basketball League, defeating the incumbent Chun Yook. In fact, he announced his bid in 2008 but lost to Chun.

== Political career ==
Prior to the 2004 election, Han announced his bid for running as an MP on 31 December 2003, and joined the Grand National Party (GNP; then Saenuri Party and now Liberty Korea Party) in January 2004. He was selected as the GNP candidate for Yongin 2nd constituency, and won with a majority of 25,319 votes. Shortly after this, he was appointed as the party's co-spokesperson but resigned after 3 months.

A pro-Park Geun-hye figure, Han contested GNP preselection for Suji District in 2008 but lost to Yoon Gun-young. He subsequently left the party and contested as an independent candidate, instead of joining the Pro-Park Alliance. He returned to GNP after his re-election.

Han contested for newly-formed Yongin 3rd constituency in 2012 and defeated the Democratic Unionist Party candidate Kim Jong-hui with a majority of 11,486 votes. Shortly after the re-election in 2016, he contested as the Saenuri president but received 9.9% and came to the last.

Prior to the 2017 presidential election, 13 Bareun Party MPs announced their return to the Liberty Korea Party (LKP). Han showed his opposition of it, adding that he would leave if the party accepts all of them. Nevertheless, he did not quit his party. He unsuccessfully contested as the party's parliamentary leader in December 2017.

On 4 March 2019, Han was appointed as the Secretary-General of the LKP by the newly-elected President Hwang Kyo-ahn. However, he stepped down on 17 June due to the "health reasons", but later Nocut News reported that he experienced discords with Hwang.

On 5 February 2020, Han was elected as the President of the newly-formed Future Korea Party, a party that was often regarded to be formed as the satellite party to the Liberty Korea Party (then United Future Party). However, he stepped down from the party presidency due to conflicts with the UFP with issues regarding candidate preselection for upcoming general election.

== Controversies ==
=== Hit and run ===
On 26 April 2012, it was reported that Han was sharing a Renault Samsung SM7, in which the driver was under influence and hit a 20-year-old girl on a pedestrian crossing. The driver, however, immediately ran away from the place and when caught by police, she had a Blood Alcohol Concentration (BAC) of 0.128%, which can lead to driving licence revocation. The Gyeonggi Democratic Unionist Party (DUP) filed a lawsuit against him under the breach of electoral law, adding that Han and the driver was having a party celebrating his re-election as an MP. Han explained that the driver was helping him to bring him to a taxi rank, so he felt sorry to reject it.

=== Collar grab ===
On 1 September 2016, Han provoked a controversy when he grabbed the Speaker's guard by a collar who was preventing journalists from entering to the Speaker's office. 4 days later, he visited the guard and apologised to him. After he was prosecuted by police on the same day, he was supposed to visit police office but absented due to the parliamentary inspection.

=== Incident with Yoo Eun-hae ===
On 13 October 2016, Han again provoked a controversy during the inspection of the Committee of Education, Culture, Sports and Tourism, when he forwarded a question to an opposition Democratic MP Yoo Eun-hae. He was asking Yoo a question, "Why are you laughing? Do you like me?", in which Yoo subsequently urged Han to sincerely apologise. Han replied that he was asking the question as her senior, but Yoo condemned that Han's remark was "such a disgusting sexual harassment". Han also added, "I'm her senior, and that's why I didn't realise for a while.", where Yoo criticised, "It was an inspection, and it's such an insult to ask like that." Yu Sung-yup, the Committee chairman, commented that any kind of controversial remarks should be avoided. Another Democratic MP, Nam In-soon, posted on her Twitter that calling Han's remark as "slut-shaming". The Democratic Party filed a report against him to the Ethics Committee, while also urging the Saenuri Party to take a suitable action against him.

=== Insulting remarks to the Secretariat ===
On 7 May 2019, it was reported that Han was insulting during the meeting with the party's secretariat. Oh Young-cheol, the Convener of the Secretariat Trade Union, explained that Han used several vulgars to the workers and asked them to get out. The trade union condemned his remarks and urged him to apologise.

== Personal life ==
Han married to Ha Ji-hyun, who was also a broadcaster of MBC. Both has two daughters — Han Hui-seung and Han Hui-min.

== Election results ==
Year	Elections	Constituency	Political party	Votes (%)	Remarks
2004	17th National Assembly General Election	Yongin B (Gyeonggi)	GNP	78,484 (56.11%)	Won
2008	18th National Assembly General Election	Yongin Suji (Gyeonggi)	Independent	44,785 (43.01%)	Won
2012	19th National Assembly General Election	Yongin C (Gyeonggi)	Saenuri	66,996 (52.07%)	Won
2016	20th National Assembly General Election	Yongin C (Gyeonggi)	Saenuri	54,836 (42.21%)	Won
