= Liberal Party (South Korea, 2020) =

2020–2024 political party in South Korea

- Leader: Son Sang-yoon
- Founded: March 9, 2020
- Dissolved: January 24, 2024
- Merged into: Liberal Democratic Party
- Headquarters: Dongil-ro 174-gil, Nowon-gu, Seoul
- Ideology: Radical anti-communism Conservatism (South Korean)
- Political position: Far-right
- Colours: Red; Ultramarine; Blue

Korean name
- Hangul: 자유당
- Hanja: 自由黨
- RR: Jayudang
- MR: Chayudang

The Liberal Party (Korean: 자유당) was a far-right political party in South Korea. It was founded on 9 March 2020, primarily by figures associated with Newstown, an online media outlet espousing patriotic, "liberal-right" and "System Club," an organisation run by internet political commentator Ji Man-won; Son Sang-yoon assumed the role of party leader. At the time of its founding, the party espoused anti-communism and New Right ideologies.

On 27 November 2023, lawyer Lee Chung-beom acquired the party and completely overhauled its platform into a "third zone" party and renamed it You Are the Flag. However, on 28 December 2023, the former leadership returned, and the party reverted to the name "Liberal Party." On 2 January 2024, an agreement was reached to merge with the Free Korea 21, and a joint press conference on 5 January 2024 announced that the merger would proceed on a party-to-party basis. The merger process was subsequently completed on 24 January 2024 to form the Liberal Democratic Party.

== Main election results ==
=== National Assembly election ===
Year	Election	District constituencies		Proportional representation		Total	
		Seats won	Vote share	Seats won	Vote share	Seats won	Vote share
2020	21st	0 / 253	0%	0 / 47	0.07%	0 / 300	0%
