= Jung Choun-sook =

South Korean politician

- 정춘숙
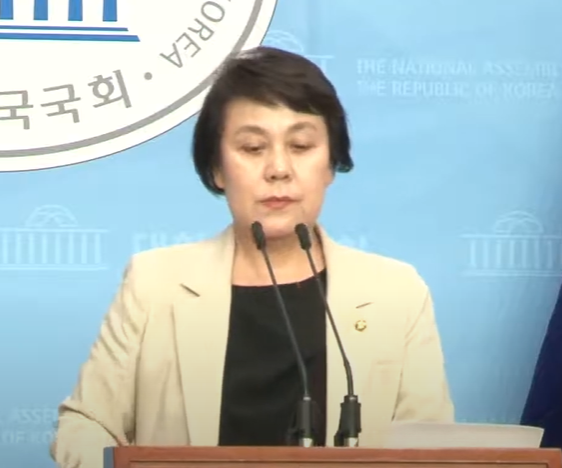

Member of the National Assembly
- In office 30 May 2020 – 29 May 2024
- Preceded by: Han Sun-kyo
- Succeeded by: Boo Seung-chan
- Constituency: Gyeonggi Yongin C
- In office 30 May 2016 – 29 May 2020
- Constituency: Proportional representation

Personal details
- Born: 8 January 1964 (age 62)
- Party: Democratic
- Education: Dankook University; Chung-Ang University; Kangnam University
- Religion: Roman Catholic (Christian name : Devora)

Jung Choun-sook (Korean: 정춘숙; Hanja: 鄭春淑; born 8 January 1964) is a South Korean politician and women's right activist.

For over 20 years she worked at Korea Women's Hot line, an NGO working for survivors and victims of sexual and domestic violence. From 1994 to 1998 she coordinated the civil rights movement which was materialised by enactment of Act on the Prevention of Domestic Violence and Protection, etc. of Victims in 1998.

Before entering politics, Jung took various policy advisory roles such as a member of gender discrimination investigatory committee of National Human Rights Commission, women policy review committee of Ministry of Justice, gender equality commission of Seoul metropolitan government and Sentencing Commission of Supreme Court.

Since becoming a member of National Assembly in 2016, she has continued her work to advocate women's rights, prevent crimes and support their victims. In 2020 she was elected as the chair of National Assembly's Gender Equality and Family Committee responsible for scrutinising Ministry of Gender Equality and Family and related agencies.

In the 2020 general election, she ran for the constituency which was taken by a senior opposition figure Han Sun-kyo for 16 years.

She earned bachelor's degree in Korean language and literature from Dankook University and Master's and doctorate in social welfare from Chung-Ang University and Kangnam University.

== Electoral history ==
Election	Year	District	Party affiliation	Votes	Percentage of votes	Results
20th National Assembly General Election	2016	Proportional representation (13rd)	Democratic Party	6,069,744	25.54%	Elected
21st National Assembly General Election	2020	Gyeonggi Yongin C	Democratic Party	49,736	51.55%	Won
