= Conservatism in South Korea =

Conservatism in South Korea is a political and social philosophy under the influences from Korean culture, from Confucianism, as well as from the Western culture due to the intense Westernisation of the country, including the adoption of Christian values and ethics. South Korean conservative parties largely believe in stances such as a developmental state, economic liberalism, strong national defence, anti-communism, pro-communitarianism, pro-Western and pro-United States, giving assistance to anti-communist North Korean defectors, supporting international sanctions and opposing human rights abuses in North Korea.

Starting from the dictatorship of Syngman Rhee, South Korean conservatism has been influenced from the military dictatorships of Park Chung-hee and Chun Doo-hwan. In domestic policy, South Korean conservatism has a strong elitist streak and promotes rapid modernisation and social stability. Since the mid-to-late 2010s, conservatives with right-wing populist tendencies have become more prominent in the public sphere. Hong Joon-pyo and Han Dong-hoon are notable examples of a right-wing populist in Korea.

Unlike conservatives in the Anglosphere, conservatives in South Korea often define themselves as liberals. Both groups fervently denounce anarchism, communism, socialism and liberalism and refer to themselves as anti-socialists. They are distinct from the general liberals in South Korea.

== Values ==
=== Domestic issues ===
Conservatives are more likely to support upholding the National Security Act.

The anti-communist tendencies of South Korean conservatives has led to perceptions by progressives and liberals that conservatives fostering McCarthyist-like red scares among the public in order to score political points. This includes an incident before the 1996 Legislative elections, where conservative lawmakers were arrested for secretly meeting with North Korean agents in Beijing to seek North's help in manipulating the outcome of the election in exchange for payoffs. The North fired artillery into the Join Security Zone on the DMZ, which caused panic among South Korean electorates, benefiting the conservative party.

=== International issues ===
Conservatism in South Korea is fervently anti-communist. South Korean conservatives oppose warming relations with North Korea, and therefore wish to strengthen the US-ROK alliance in order to improve South Korean security, in contrast to South Korean progressives who prefer détente with North Korea through the Sunshine Policy along with either maintaining the US-ROK alliance or softening it as well as pursuing a hostile policy towards Japan. However, there is a split between moderates and hardliners among conservatives, with the former emphasizing humanitarian issues related to North Korean defectors and identifying themselves as liberals, while the latter, in possible addition to the former, takes up the traditional aggressive emphasis on anti-communism and pro-Americanism.

== History ==
Before democratisation in 1987, South Korean conservatives were characterised not only by anti-communism, but also authoritarianism and developmentalism. After 1987, there was a trend in conservatism towards rebranding as the New Right and focusing on economic neoliberalism. In addition, conservatives adapted to the new democratic environment by increasing the number of conservative activist groups and online presence.

Following 1987, the South Korean public became less interested in issues such as class and politics than in the past, and thus, overall, both progressives and conservatives shifted their messaging; the former shifted from radical politics to supporting the likes of social democracy and welfare expansion, whereas the latter emphasised neoliberal values such as "freedom, capabilities, and competition of individuals".

The large city of Daegu, although a site of radical politics in the earlier postwar era, was transformed under the rule of Daegu-born Park Chung-hee and today has been called a "citadel of conservatism" in South Korea.

Following the success of Lee Myung-bak in the 2007 presidential election, some viewed it as a return to conservatism in South Korea after a decade of rule under progressive presidents, although an analysis by David C. Kang let him to argue that it was a turn towards centrism among the populace, given Lee's pragmatic business-minded tendencies, rather than traditional "arch-conservatism" of candidate Lee Hoi-chang. For instance, Lee pursued a more constructive and realistic foreign policy relationship with China in contrast to what more strident anti-communists would prefer, indicating the modern unpracticality of demonising China, even among conservative heads of state. During the campaigning seasons, Lee's aides also worked to present his approach as being "neither left nor right". In 2012, South Korea elected its first female president, Park Geun-hye of the conservative Saenuri Party. She would later be removed from office in 2017.

Jeong Tae-heon, a professor of Korean history at Korea University has expressed concerns that disputes over the term Jayuminjujuui (Korean: 자유민주주의; lit. '"liberal democracy" or "free and democracy"') reflect a strong conservative bias reacting against North Korea's political ideologies, similar to political views seen in 1950. The term liberal democracy as used by South Korean conservatives has a different connotation than in the Anglosphere, as its reflects the anti-communism and state-guided economic develop of the pre-1987 era.

In 2020, People Power Party's leader Kim Chong-in apologized for the Gwangju Uprising. But some conservative citizen groups such as the Korean Council for Restoration National Identity and American and Korean Friendship National Council protested at UNESCO headquarters in Paris in May 2011 to prevent inscribing the records of the Gwangju Uprising in the Memory of the World Register, and to petition for "reconsidering identifying North Korean Special Forces as the perpetrators of the GDM.

In 2022, PPP candidate Yoon Suk Yeol was elected as the president of South Korea; Yoon declared martial law in December 2024, prompting his impeachment. The PPP has since experienced factionalism in its ranks, and has lost the 2025 presidential election and the 2026 local elections. The conservative Reform Party has also gained traction since 2024, led by former PPP leader Lee Jun-seok.

== Conservative parties ==
The political party that once were ruling party are in bold. KIP is the exception for being a ruling party during Provisional Governmental era.

=== Mainstream parties ===
- **National Alliance for the Rapid Realization of Korean Independence** (1946–1958; Governing period: 1948–1950)
- **Korea Nationalist Party** (1948–1958; Governing years: 1950–1954)
- **Liberal Party** (1951–1970; Governing period: 1954–1960)
- **Democratic Republican Party** (1963–1980)

- Korean National Party → New Democratic Republican Party (1980–1990)

- **Democratic Justice Party** (1980–1990 also as governing period)
- **Democratic Liberal Party → New Korea Party** (1990–1997)

- United Liberal Democrats (1992–2006)

- **Grand National Party → Saenuri Party → Liberty Korea Party** (1997–2020; Governing period: 2007–2017)

- Liberty Forward Party → Advancement Unification Party (2006–2012)
- Pro-Park Coalition → Future Hope Alliance (2007–2012)
- Bareun Party (2016–2018)
- Bareunmirae Party (2018–2020)
- New Conservative Party (2020)

- **United Future Party → People Power Party** (since 2020; Governing period: 2022–2025)

- Future Korea Party (satellite party for the 2020 election)
- People Future Party (satellite party for the 2024 election)

=== Minor parties ===
- Korea Independence Party (1928–1970)
- Korean National Youth Association (1946-1949)
- Federation Korean National Independence (1947–1951)
- Korea National Party (1947–1958)
- Conservative Party (1963)
- Righteous Citizens Party → Justice Party (1963–1967)
- New People's Association → People's Party (1963–1971)
- New Political Reform Party (1992)
- United People's Party → Democratic Party (1992–1995)
- Democratic Republican Party (1997–2009)
- New Korea Party of Hope (2000–2001)
- National Integration 21 (2004)
- People First Party (2005–2008)
- Pro-Park United (2006–2012)
- Party of Future Union (2010–2012)
- Go! Party for the Grand People (2011–2012)
- Korea Vision Party (2012)
- Hannara Party (2012–2016)
- Chinbak Yeondae (since 2012)
- Ghana Anti-Communist Korean Party (since 2012)
- Republican Party (2014–2020)
- Patriotic Party → United Korean Party → New National Participation Party (since 2015)
- Korean National Party (2016–2020)
- Pro-Ban Unification Party → Korea Economic Party → Free Korea 21 → Liberty and Democracy Party (since 2016)
- Evergreen Korea Party (2017–2018)
- Saenuri Party (since 2017)
- New Korean Peninsula Party (since 2017)
- Dawn of Liberty Party (since 2019)
- People Party (2020–2022)
- Liberty Party (2020–2024)
- Our Republican Party (since 2020)
- Pro-Park New Party (since 2020)
- Future of Chungcheong Province Party (since 2020)
- Reform Party (since 2024)
- Freedom and Innovation Party (since 2025)

== Conservative media in South Korea ==
The Chojoongdong media cartel wields the largest political influence in the South Korean political scene through newspaper and other print publications. The three media cartels have been criticized for fabricating stories against North Korea to support conservative rhetoric.

- Chosun Ilbo – right-wing, anti-communist and conservative
  - TV Chosun (broadcasting)
- Dong-a Ilbo – right-wing, conservative
  - Channel A (broadcasting)
- JoongAng Ilbo – centre-right, moderate conservative and pro-Chaebol
  - Korea JoongAng Daily (English-language newspapers)
  - JTBC (broadcasting)
- Korea Economic Daily – pro-business and conservative
- Kukmin Ilbo – centrist, Christian values
- Maeil Business Newspaper – pro-business
- Munhwa Ilbo – right-wing, conservative and pro-Chaebol
- Segye Ilbo - right-wing, pro-Unification Church

== Conservative presidents ==
- Rhee Syng-man (Liberal Party, 1948–1960)
- Park Chung-hee (Military junta/Democratic Republican Party, 1962–1979)
- Chun Doo-hwan (Military junta/Democratic Justice Party, 1980–1988)
- Roh Tae-woo (Democratic Justice Party→Democratic Liberal Party, 1988–1993)
- Kim Young-sam (Democratic Liberal Party→New Korea Party→Grand National Party, 1993–1998)
- Lee Myung-bak (Grand National Party→Saenuri Party, 2008–2013)
- Park Geun-hye (Saenuri Party→Liberty Korea Party, 2013–2017)
- Yoon Suk-yeol (People Power Party, 2022–2025)

== Major conservative parties election results of South Korea ==
| Election | Candidate | Total votes | Share of votes | Outcome | Party name |
|---|---|---|---|---|---|
| 1948 | Rhee Syng-man | 180 (electoral vote) | 91.8% | Elected ✓ | NARKKI |
| 1948 | Kim Gu | 13 (electoral vote) | 6.7% | Defeated ✗ | Korean Independence Party |
| 1952 | Rhee Syng-man | 5,238,769 | 74.6% | Elected ✓ | Liberal Party |
| 1956 | Rhee Syng-man | 5,046,437 | 70.0% | Elected ✓ | Liberal Party |
| March 1960 | Rhee Syng-man | 9,633,376 | 100.0% | Elected ✓ | Liberal Party |
| August 1960 | no candidate | —N/a | | | |
| 1963 | Park Chung-hee | 4,702,640 | 46.6% | Elected ✓ | Democratic Republican Party |
| 1967 | Park Chung-hee | 5,688,666 | 51.4% | Elected ✓ | Democratic Republican Party |
| 1971 | Park Chung-hee | 6,342,828 | 53.2% | Elected ✓ | Democratic Republican Party |
| 1972 | Park Chung-hee | 2,357 (electoral vote) | 99.91 | Elected ✓ | Democratic Republican Party |
| 1978 | Park Chung-hee | 2,578 (electoral vote) | 99.96% | Elected ✓ | Democratic Republican Party |
| 1981 | Chun Doo-hwan | 4,755 (electoral vote) | 90.2% | Elected ✓ | Democratic Justice Party |
| 1987 | Roh Tae-woo | 8,282,738 | 36.6% | Elected ✓ | Democratic Justice Party |
| 1987 | Kim Jong-pil | 1,823,067 | 8.1% | Defeated ✗ | New Democratic Republican Party |
| 1992 | Kim Young-sam | 9,977,332 | 42.0% | Elected ✓ | Democratic Liberal Party |
| 1992 | Chung Ju-yung | 3,880,067 | 16.3% | Defeated ✗ | United People's Party |
| 1997 | Lee Hoi-chang | 9,935,718 | 38.7% | Defeated ✗ | Grand National Party |
| 1997 | Lee In-je | 4,925,591 | 19.2% | Defeated ✗ | New National Party |
| 2002 | Lee Hoi-chang | 11,443,297 | 46.5% | Defeated ✗ | Grand National Party |
| 2007 | Lee Myung-bak | 11,492,389 | 48.7% | Elected ✓ | Grand National Party |
| 2007 | Lee Hoi-chang | 3,559,963 | 15.1% | Defeated ✗ | Independent |
| 2012 | Park Geun-hye | 15,773,128 | 51.6% | Elected ✓ | Saenuri Party |
| 2017 | Hong Jun-pyo | 7,852,849 | 24.03% | Defeated ✗ | Liberty Korea Party |
| 2017 | Yoo Seung-min | 2,208,771 | 6.76% | Defeated ✗ | Bareun Party |
| 2017 | Cho Won-jin | 42,949 | 0.13% | Defeated ✗ | Saenuri Party |
| 2017 | Lee Jae-oh | 9,140 | 0.03% | Defeated ✗ | Evergreen Korea Party |
| 2017 | Oh Young-guk | 6,040 | 0.02% | Defeated ✗ | Korea Economic Party |
| 2022 | Yoon Suk-yeol | 16,394,815 | 48.56% | Elected ✓ | People Power Party |
| 2022 | Cho Won-jin | 25,972 | 0.08% | Defeated ✗ | Our Republican Party |
| 2022 | Kim Gyeong-jae | 8,317 | 0.02% | Defeated ✗ | New Liberal Democratic Union |
| 2022 | Ok Un-ho | 4,970 | 0.01% | Defeated ✗ | Saenuri Party |
| 2025 | Kim Moon-soo | 14,395,639 | 41.15% | Defeated ✗ | People Power Party |
| 2025 | Lee Jun-seok | 2,917,523 | 8.34% | Defeated ✗ | Reform Party |

=== General elections ===
| Election | Total seats won | Total votes | Share of votes | Outcome of election | Status | Election leader | Party name |
|---|---|---|---|---|---|---|---|
| 1948 | 55 / 200 | 1,755,543 | 26.1 | new 55 seats; Minority | in government | Rhee Syng-man | NARRKI |
| 1950 | 24 / 210 | 677,173 | 9.7 | new 24 seats; Minority | in government | Yun Chi-young | Korea Nationalist Party |
| 1950 | 14 / 210 | 473,153 | 6.8 | ▼41 seats; Minority | in government | Rhee Syng-man | National Association |
| 1950 | 0 / 210 | 17,745 | 0.3 | new 0 seats; Minority | in opposition | | Korea Independence Party |
| 1954 | 114 / 203 | 2,756,061 | 36.8 | new 114 seats; Majority | in government | Rhee Syng-man | Liberal Party |
| 1954 | 3 / 210 | 192,109 | 2.6 | ▼11 seats; Minority | in government | | National Association |
| 1954 | 3 / 203 | 72,923 | 1.0 | ▼21 seats; Minority | in government | Yun Chi-young | Korea Nationalist Party |
| 1958 | 126 / 233 | 3,607,092 | 42.1 | ▲12 seats; Majority | in government | Rhee Syng-man | Liberal Party |
| 1958 | 0 / 233 | 50,568 | 0.6 | ▼3 seats; Minority | in government | Rhee Syng-man | National Association |
| 1960 | 2 / 233 | 249,960 | 2.8 | ▼124 seats; Minority | in opposition | Rhee Syng-man | Liberal Party |
| 1960 | 0 / 233 | 26,649 | 0.3 | new 0 seats; Minority | in opposition | | Korea Independence Party |
| 1963 | 110 / 175 | 3,112,985 | 33.5% | new 110 seats; Majority | in government | Park Chung-hee | Democratic Republican Party |
| 1963 | 0 / 175 | 1,122,357: Conservative Party: 278,477; LP: 271,820; Righteous Citizens Party: 259,960; Autumn Wind Association: 183,938; KIP: 128,162 | 12.1% | extra-parliamentary | in opposition | – | Others |
| 1967 | 129 / 175 | 5,494,922 | 50.6% | ▲19 seats; Majority | in government | Park Chung-hee | Democratic Republican Party |
| 1967 | 0 / 175 | 957,378: LP: 393,448; KIP: 240,936; People's Party: 180,324; Justice Party: 142,670 | 8.8% | extra-parliamentary | in opposition | – | Others |
| 1971 | 113 / 204 | 5,460,581 | 48.8% | ▼16 seats; Majority | in government | Park Chung-hee | Democratic Republican Party |
| 1973 | 146 / 219 | 4,251,754 | 38.7% | ▼40 seats; Majority | in government | Park Chung-hee | Democratic Republican Party |
| 1978 | 145 / 231 | 4,695,995 | 31.7% | ▲2 seats; Majority | in government | Park Chung-hee | Democratic Republican Party |
| 1981 | 151 / 276 | 5,776,624 | 35.6% | new 151 seats; Majority | in government | Chun Doo-hwan | Democratic Justice Party |
| 1981 | 25 / 276 | 2,147,293 | 13.2% | new 15 seats; Minority | in opposition | Kim Jong-cheol | Korean National Party |
| 1985 | 148 / 276 | 7,040,811 | 34.0% | ▼3 seats; Majority | in government | Chun Doo-hwan | Democratic Justice Party |
| 1985 | 20 / 276 | 1,828,744 | 9.2% | ▼5 seats; Minority | in opposition | Kim Jong-cheol | Korean National Party |
| 1988 | 125 / 299 | 6,675,494 | 34.0% | ▼23 seats; Minority | in government | Roh Tae-woo | Democratic Justice Party |
| 1988 | 35 / 299 | 3,062,506 | 15.6% | new 35 seats; Minority | in opposition (1988-1990) | Kim Jong-pil | New Democratic Republican Party |
| 1988 | 35 / 299 | 3,062,506 | 15.6% | new 35 seats; Minority | in government (1990-1993) | Kim Jong-pil | New Democratic Republican Party |
| 1988 | 0 / 299 | 65,032 | 0.3% | ▼20 seats; extra-parliamentary | in opposition | Lee Man-sup | Korean National Party |
| 1992 | 149 / 299 | 7,923,719 | 38.5% | new 149 seats; Minority | in government | Roh Tae-woo | Democratic Liberal Party |
| 1992 | 31 / 299 | 3,574,419 | 17.4% | new 31 seats; Minority | in opposition | Chung Ju-yung | United People's Party |
| 1996 | 139 / 299 | 6,783,730 | 34.5% | new 139 seats; Minority | in government (1996-1998) | Kim Young-sam | New Korea Party |
| 1996 | 139 / 299 | 6,783,730 | 34.5% | new 139 seats; Minority | in opposition (1998-2000) | Kim Young-sam | New Korea Party |
| 1996 | 50 / 299 | 3,178,474 | 16.2% | new 50 seats; Minority | in opposition (1996-1998) | Kim Jong-pil | United Liberal Democrats |
| 1996 | 50 / 299 | 3,178,474 | 16.2% | new 50 seats; Minority | in government (1998-2000) | Kim Jong-pil | United Liberal Democrats |
| 2000 | 133 / 273 | 7,365,359 | 39.0% | new 133 seats; Minority | in opposition | Lee Hoi-chang | Grand National Party |
| 2000 | 17 / 273 | 1,859,331 | 9.8% | ▼35 seats; Minority | in government (2000-2001) | Kim Jong-pil | United Liberal Democrats |
| 2000 | 17 / 273 | 1,859,331 | 9.8% | ▼35 seats; Minority | in opposition (2001-2004) | Kim Jong-pil | United Liberal Democrats |
| 2000 | 3 / 273 | 695,423 | 3.7% | new 3 seats; Minority | in opposition | Cho Soon | Democratic People's Party |
| 2000 | 1 / 273 | 77,498 | 0.4% | new 1 seats; Minority | in opposition | Kim Yong-hwan; Heo Hwa-pyeong | New Korea Party of Hope |
| 2000 | 0 / 273 | 3,950 | 0.0% | new 0 seats; extra-parliamentary | in opposition | Heo Kyung-young | Democratic Republican Party |
| 2004 | 121 / 299 | 7,613,660 | 35.8% | ▼24 seats; Minority | in opposition | Park Geun-hye | Grand National Party |
| 2004 | 4 / 299 | 600,462 | 2.8% | ▼6 seats; Minority | in opposition | Kim Jong-pil | United Liberal Democrats |
| 2004 | 0 / 299 | 144,106: NI21: 119,746; DRP: 24,360 | 0.68% | extra-parliamentary | in opposition | – | Others |
| 2008 | 153 / 299 | 6,421,654 | 37.5% | ▲32 seats; Majority | in government | Kang Jae-seop | Grand National Party |
| 2008 | 18 / 299 | 1,173,463 | 6.8% | new 18 seats; Minority | in government | Lee Hoi-chang | Liberty Forward Party |
| 2008 | 14 / 299 | 2,258,750 | 13.2% | new 14 seats; Minority | in government | Suh Chung-won | Pro-Park Coalition |
| 2012 | 152 / 300 | 9,130,651 | 42.8% | new 152 seats; Majority | in government | Park Geun-hye | Saenuri Party |
| 2012 | 5 / 300 | 690,754 | 3.2% | ▼13 seats; Minority | in government | Sim Dae-pyung | Liberty Forward Party |
| 2012 | 0 / 300 | 567,484: Hannara: 181,822; K Party: 156,241; Pro-Park: 134,898; Go! PGP: 60,428; PFU: 19,962; GKP: 14,133 | 2.66% | extra-parliamentary | in opposition | – | Others |
| 2016 | 122 / 300 | 7,960,272 | 42.8% | ▼30 seats; Minority | in government (2016-2017) | Kim Moo-sung | Saenuri Party |
| 2016 | 122 / 300 | 7,960,272 | 42.8% | ▼30 seats; Minority | in opposition (2017-2020) | Kim Moo-sung | Saenuri Party |
| 2016 | 0 / 300 | 163,980: GNP: 86,464; Let's Go! Korea: 27,103; UNP: 16,427; RP: 12,295; Chinbak Yeondae: 11,981; Pro-Ban: 9,710 | 0.69% | extra-parliamentary | in opposition | – | Others |
| 2020 | 103 / 300 | 11,915,277 (Constituency); 9,441,520 (Party-list PR) | 41.45% (Constituency); 33.84% (Party-list PR) | ▼8 seats; Minority | in opposition | Hwang Kyo-ahn | United Future Party (Constituency); Future Korea Party (Party-list PR) |
| 2020 | 0 / 300 | 51,885 (FPTP); 574,307 (PR): ORP: 208,719 (PR)/47,299 (FPTP); Pro-Park: 142,747 (PR)/1,884 (FPTP); Saenuri Party: 80,208 (PR)/269 (FPTP); KEP: 48,807 (PR); Let's Go! Korea: 34,012 (PR); Liberty Party: 20,599 (PR); NNPR: 15,998 (PR); NNPP: 12,376 (PR); FCPP: 10,841 (PR)/1,148 (FPTP); GNP: 1,228 (FPTP); RP: 57 (FPTP) | 0.18% (FPTP); 2.06% (PR) | extra-parliamentary | in opposition | – | Others |
| 2024 | 108 / 300 | 13,179,769 (Constituency); 10,395,264 (Party-list PR) | 45.73% (Constituency); 36.67% (Party-list PR) | ▲5 seats; Minority | in government | Han Dong-hoon | People Power Party (Constituency); People Future Party (Party-list PR) |
| 2024 | 3 / 300 | 195,147 (Constituency); 1,025,775 (Party-list PR) | 0.67% (Constituency); 3.62% (Party-list PR) | ▲5 seats; Minority | in opposition | Lee Jun-seok | Reform Party |
| 2024 | 0 / 300 | 15,392 (FPTP); 229,066 (PR): GNP: 72,925 (PR); Saenuri Party: 57,210 (PR); FDP: 39,977 (PR)/1,245 (FPTP); ORP: 29,895 (PR)/12,814 (FPTP); NNPR: 10,242 (PR); TF: 9,417 (PR)/1,333 (FPTP); Let's Go! Korea: 7,820 (PR); NNPP: 1,580 (PR) | 0.53% (FPTP); 0.81% (PR) | extra-parliamentary | in opposition | – | Others |

=== Local elections ===
| Election | Metropolitan mayor/Governor | Provincial legislature | Municipal mayor | Municipal legislature | Party name |
|---|---|---|---|---|---|
| 1995 | 5 / 15 | 284 / 875 | 70 / 230 | | Democratic Liberal Party |
| 1995 | 4 / 15 | 82 / 875 | 23 / 230 | | United Liberal Democrats |
| 1998 | 6 / 16 | 224 / 616 | 74 / 232 | | Grand National Party |
| 1998 | 4 / 16 | 82 / 616 | 29 / 232 | | United Liberal Democrats |
| 2002 | 11 / 16 | 467 / 682 | 136 / 227 | | Grand National Party |
| 2002 | 1 / 16 | 33 / 682 | 16 / 227 | | United Liberal Democrats |
| 2006 | 12 / 16 | 557 / 733 | 155 / 230 | 1,621 / 2,888 | Grand National Party |
| 2010 | 6 / 16 | 288 / 761 | 82 / 228 | 1,247 / 2,888 | Grand National Party |
| 2010 | 1 / 16 | 41 / 761 | 13 / 228 | 117 / 2,888 | Liberty Forward Party |
| 2010 | 0 / 16 | 3 / 761 | 0 / 228 | 19 / 2,888 | Pro-Park Coalition |
| 2014 | 8 / 17 | 416 / 789 | 117 / 226 | 1,413 / 2,898 | Saenuri Party |
| 2018 | 2 / 17 | 137 / 824 | 53 / 226 | 1,009 / 2,927 | Liberty Korea Party |
| 2022 | 12 / 17 | 540 / 872 | 145 / 226 | 1,435 / 2,987 | People Power Party |
| 2026 | 4 / 16 | 327 / 933 | 95 / 227 | 1,277 / 3,035 | People Power Party |

== See also ==
- Conservative political parties in South Korea (in Korean)
- Economic liberalism
- Economic interventionism
- Korean collaborators with the Empire of Japan
- Neo-Confucianism
- New Right (South Korea)
- Liberalism in South Korea
  - Liberal conservatism (centre-right)
- October Restoration
- One-People Principle
- Progressivism in South Korea
- Sadaejuui (factions)
- Social conservatism
