= 2016 South Korean legislative election =

- 13 April 2016

All 300 seats in the National Assembly 151 seats needed for a majority
- Turnout: 58.15% (▲3.91pp; Const. votes); 58.03% (▲3.79pp; PR votes)
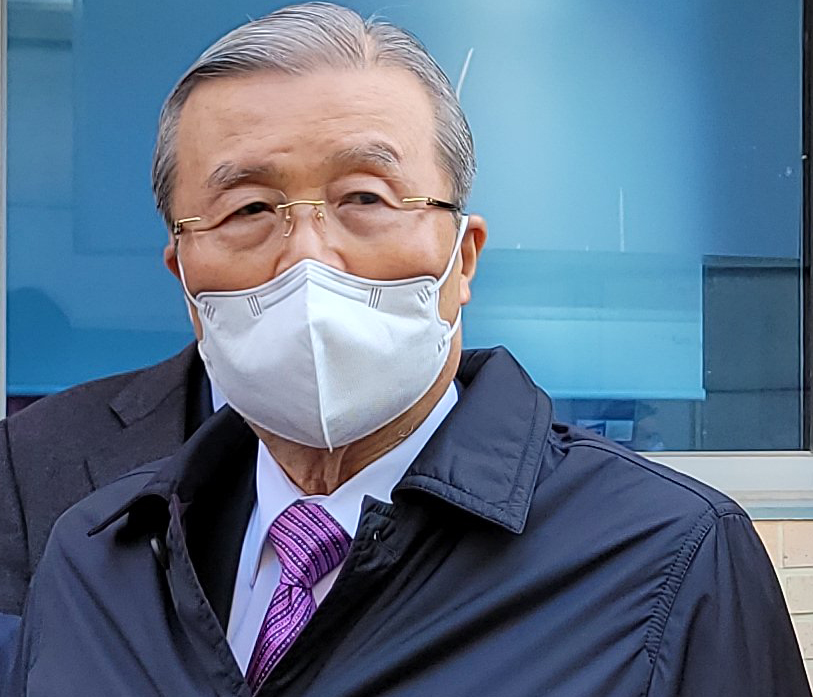

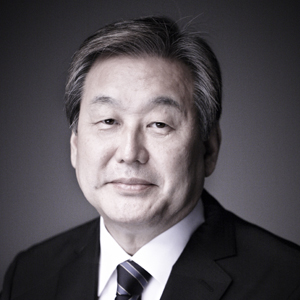

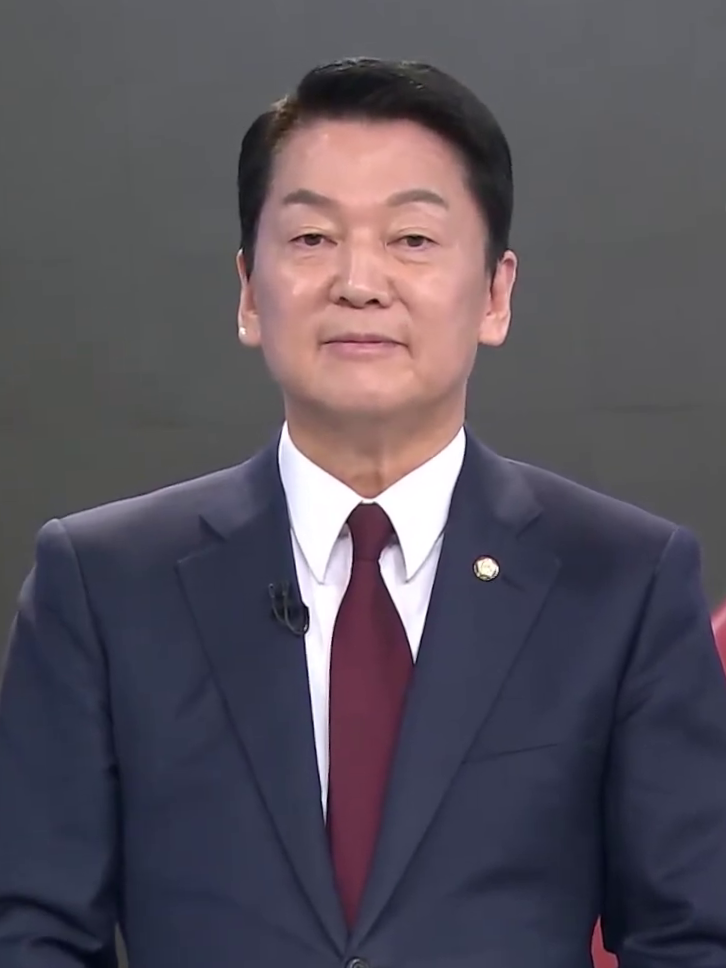

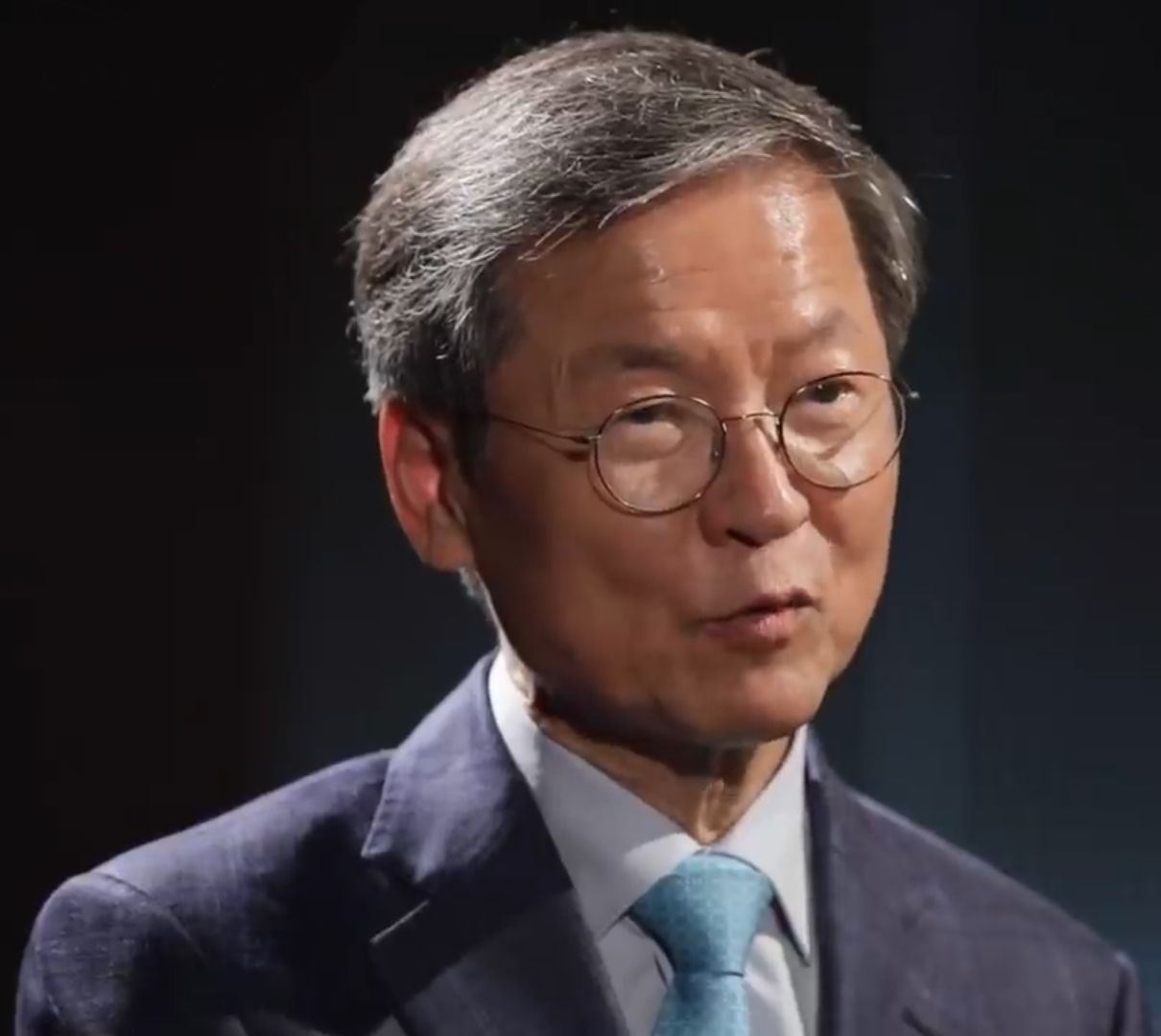

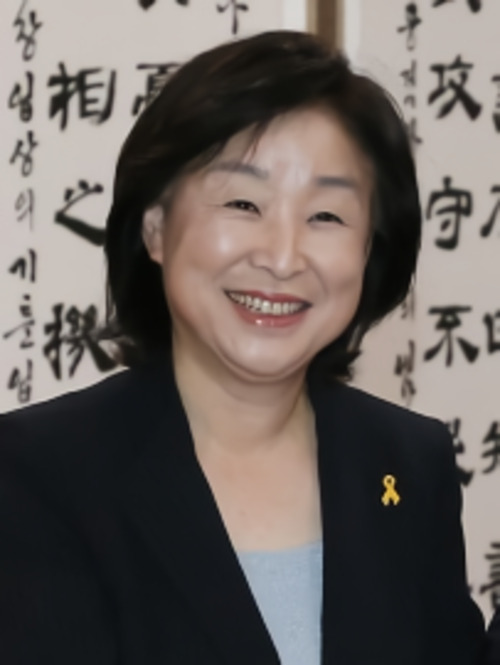
	Majority party	Minority party
Leader	Kim Chong-in	Kim Moo-sung
Party	Democratic	Saenuri
Last election	127 seats (Note: as Democratic United Party)	157 seats (Note: Saenuri and Liberty Forward Party)
Seats won	123	122
Seat change	▼4	▼35
Constituency vote	8,881,369	9,200,690
% and swing	37.00% (▼0.85pp)	38.33% (▼7.15pp)
Regional vote	6,069,744	7,960,272
% and swing	25.55% (▼11.09pp)	33.50% (▼12.54pp)
	Third party	Fourth party
Leader	Ahn Cheol-soo; Chun Jung-bae	Sim Sang-jung
Party	People	Justice
Last election	Did not exist	Did not exist
Seats won	38	6
Seat change	New	New
Constituency vote	3,565,451	395,357
% and swing	14.85% (New)	1.65% (New)
Regional vote	6,355,572	1,719,891
% and swing	26.75% (New)	7.24% (New)
- Results of the election.
Speaker before election
Chung Eui-hwa
Saenuri
Elected Speaker
Chung Sye-kyun
Democratic

Legislative elections were held in South Korea on 13 April 2016. All 300 members of the National Assembly were elected, 253 from first-past-the-post constituencies and 47 from proportional party lists. The election was an upset victory for the liberal Democratic Party, which defied opinion polling by winning a plurality of seats in the election and defeating the ruling conservative Saenuri Party by one seat. In votes for party lists, however, Democratic Party came third, behind the Saenuri Party in first place and the new People Party in second.

The election marked an upheaval in the South Korean party system, installing the second National Assembly without a working majority since 2000 and a three-party system for the first time since 1996. The People Party attained a kingmaker position in the new Assembly, while the leadership of the Saenuri Party including chairman Kim Moo-sung resigned en masse following their defeat, relinquishing control of the party to an emergency response commission.

The 2016 legislative election was the first to be held in South Korea following the formation of the People Party and the enforcement of controversial Constitutional Court rulings dissolving the left-wing Unified Progressive Party and mandating the redistricting of the Assembly's constituencies.

== Background ==
In the 2012 legislative election, the ruling conservative Saenuri Party won a slim majority of 152 seats out of 300. The party also retained control of the presidency, as Saenuri candidate Park Geun-hye won the presidential election that year. By the time of the 2016 legislative election, the Saenuri delegation had fallen to 146 out of 292 filled Assembly seats, exactly 50%. The 2016 election was seen as an important stepping stone to the 2017 presidential election, which was held on 9 May 2017.

=== Redistricting ===
In 2014, the Constitutional Court of Korea mandated that because the population disparities between the Assembly constituencies were resulting in unequal representation, the constituencies must be redistricted for the 2016 elections. The Court held that the largest and smallest constituencies by population must not differ from each other by more than 2:1, and that the number of constituents in any given constituency must not differ from the average number of constituents by more than one third.

A deadline of 31 December 2015 was set for the redistricting to take place. Nonetheless, by the end of 2015 the National Assembly had not approved a new electoral map. Viewing the situation as an emergency, the National Election Commission was forced to allow registered candidates to campaign without a set map of constituencies. The crisis was ultimately resolved in February 2016 with an agreement between the two major parties that allowed a new electoral map to be passed by the National Assembly. The new set of provisions raised the number of districts from 246 to 253, while decreasing the number of list-selected seats from 54 to 47.

Region	Number of seats changed		Region	Number of seats changed		Region	Number of seats changed	
Seoul	48 → 49	+1	Ulsan	6 → 6	0	South Jeolla	11 → 10	−1
Busan	18 → 18	0	Gyeonggi	52 → 60	+8	North Gyeongsang	15 → 13	−2
Daegu	12 → 12	0	Gangwon	9 → 8	−1	South Gyeongsang	16 → 16	0
Incheon	12 → 13	+1	North Chungcheong	8 → 8	0	Jeju	3 → 3	0
Gwangju	8 → 8	0	South Chungcheong	10 → 11	+1	Sejong	1 → 1	0
Daejeon	6 → 7	+1	North Jeolla	11 → 10	−1	Proportional representation	54 → 47	−7

=== Reordering of the opposition ===
In the aftermath of the 2013 South Korean sabotage plot, another controversial Constitutional Court ruling enforced the dissolution of the Unified Progressive Party due to the party's alleged ideological affinity to North Korea. The dissolution of the UPP left the Justice Party as the sole left-wing democratic socialist party in the National Assembly. The Korean Confederation of Trade Unions, the most influential democratic trade union organisation in Korea that had originally supported the UPP, now endorsed the Justice Party. The Justice Party's candidates and Assembly members were considered to have similar political views as the left-wing members of the main opposition Democratic Party, and many votes from the Justice Party shifted to the Democratic Party.

The opposition was further fragmented when Ahn Cheol-soo defected from the main opposition Democratic Party and established a new People Party in early 2016. Due to South Korea's largely first-past-the-post electoral system, the division between the liberal Democratic and People parties had led to projections of a sweeping victory for the ruling Saenuri Party in the elections. The two opposition parties considered an electoral alliance but by 5 April the idea was abandoned, with interim Democratic leader Kim Chong-in stating that his party "will hold the elections whether the People's Party is there or not".

=== Legislative gridlock ===
The outgoing 19th National Assembly was marked by political gridlock. In February 2016, Democratic lawmakers undertook the world's longest filibuster to stall an anti-terrorism bill, and the Assembly passed less than a third of the bills introduced in its term. The Saenuri Party aimed to win a supermajority of 180 seats in the 2016 election so that it could ease the gridlock by repealing the existing requirement for three-fifths of the Assembly to agree to the introduction of each bill.

== Electoral system ==
300 members of the National Assembly were elected in the 2016 elections, of whom 253 (84%) were elected from single-member constituencies on a first-past-the-post basis, and 47 (16%) from closed party lists through proportional representation by the Hare quota largest remainder method, in accordance with South Korea's Public Official Election Act. In order to win seats through proportional representation, parties needed to pass an election threshold of either 5 single-member districts or 3% of the total list vote.

=== Restrictions on candidates ===
Candidates for the National Assembly were required to pay a fee of 15,000,000 South Korean won (US$13,000 as of April 2016), and under the National Security Act the Constitutional Court may block the registration of "left-wing", "pro–North Korean" parties, though this provision had not affected the previous election in 2012.

=== Date and process ===
The 2016 election for the National Assembly was held on 13 April, in accordance with Article 34 of the Public Official Election Act, which specifies that Election Day for legislative elections is held on "the first Wednesday from the 50th day before the expiration of the [National Assembly members'] term of office". Eligible voters were required to be registered and at least 19 years old on the day of the election, and needed to show an approved form of identification at the polling place. Polls on Election Day were open from 6 a.m. to 6 p.m. Korea Standard Time (21:00–09:00 UTC, 12–13 April).

Since 2009, voters have been able to vote overseas, and the election began with registered overseas voters casting ballots between 30 March and 4 April. For the first time in a national election, the National Election Commission also allowed early votes to be cast at polling stations in Korea without notice. This early voting period lasted from 8 to 9 April, in which time the NEC reported a high turnout of 12.2%.

== Political parties ==
Parties	Leader	Ideology	Seats		Status
Parties	Leader	Ideology	Last election	Before election	Status
Saenuri Party	Kim Moo-sung	Conservatism	152 / 300	145 / 300	Government
Saenuri Party	Kim Moo-sung	Conservatism	5 / 300 (Note: Liberty Forward Party)	145 / 300	Government
Democratic Party	Kim Chong-in	Liberalism	127 / 300 (Note: Democratic United Party)	103 / 300	Opposition
People Party	Ahn Cheol-soo; Chun Jung-bae	Reformism	Did not exist	20 / 300	Opposition
Justice Party	Sim Sang-jung	Progressivism	Did not exist	5 / 300	Opposition
Minjoo Party	Gang Sin-seong	Liberalism	Did not exist	1 / 300	Opposition
Unified Progressive Party	Lee Jung-hee	Progressivism	13 / 300	Dissolved	Opposition

Four major parties contested the 2016 election:

- The Saenuri Party, led by Kim Moo-sung, the conservative ruling party
- The Democratic Party, led on an interim basis by Kim Chong-in, the main liberal opposition party
- The People Party, led jointly by Ahn Cheol-soo and Chun Jung-bae, a centrist party formed in early 2016 from a split from the Democratic Party
- The Justice Party, led by standing chairwoman Sim Sang-jung, a left-wing progressive party

Two other parties had one member in the outgoing National Assembly: the religious conservative Christian Liberal Party, and another center-left party known as the Minjoo Party. (Note: Unless otherwise specified, "Minjoo" or "Minjoo Party" refers to the main opposition Democratic Party (South Korea, 2015), not the minor party.)

=== Candidate nominations ===
The Saenuri Party's candidate nomination process proved contentious. Several members of the Saenuri nominations committee accused party chairman Kim Moo-sung of becoming unduly involved in the process, and the party deselected a number of candidates who were seen as being opposed to the party leadership and President Park Geun-hye. Many of the deselected candidates defected from the party and announced that they would run as independents. On 4 April, a spokesman for the party said that "during the candidate selection process, we upset our people and [the number of] our supporters who may not vote is worse [than we expected]." The party published a theme song apologizing for the nominations controversy. It also is thought by many that it was the main reason that caused the Saenuri Party to lose.

== Campaign ==
Campaigning for the election officially began on 30 March, lasting until 12 April. Under South Korean law, candidates were only permitted to campaign in a limited fashion before the beginning of the designated period, including sending a maximum of five text messages publicizing themselves to each voter.

=== National security issues ===
National security issues were a topic of contention in the campaign between the Saenuri and Democratic parties, though the People Party focused on other policy areas.

The Saenuri Party argued for a hard-line approach to North Korea, and Saenuri chairman Kim Moo-sung accused the main opposition Democratic Party of pro–North Korean activity due to its support for the reopening of the Kaesong Industrial Complex, an industrial park operated collaboratively by North and South Korea that had been closed down in February 2016. The Democratic Party sought to portray the reopening of the complex as an economic rather than a political issue.

The South Korean government announced a series of defections from the North in early April, with critics viewing the announcements as an electoral strategy on behalf of the ruling party. A local media report quoted an unnamed government official as saying that the Blue House had overruled the Ministry of Unification's objections to publicizing the defections. The Ministry of Unification denied any connection between the announcements and the election campaign.

Candidates from both the opposition and the ruling party also pledged to push for the relocation of U.S. military bases from their constituencies.

=== Economic issues ===
The Korean economy was a dominant area of debate, as the governing Saenuri Party promoted business-friendly economic reforms while opposition parties attacked the government for presiding over a historically high youth unemployment rate and declining economic growth. The Saenuri Party sought to gain support for labor reforms initiated by President Park, which aimed to cut unemployment by increasing contract flexibility. Trade unions attacked the plans, arguing that the new laws would strip away necessary protections from workers. The Democratic Party accused the ruling party of economic mismanagement, and used the campaign to push for "economic democratization" and a shift from larger conglomerates to small business; the party also promised to raise pensions and the minimum wage, to sponsor public housing development, and to expand mandatory youth employment quotas. Critics argued that Democratic plans would have a distortionary effect on the labor market. Sim Sang-jung, chairwoman of the left-wing Justice Party, argued that the Saenuri, Democratic, and People parties had all failed to articulate distinctive economic policies.

=== Social issues ===
Speaking in Seoul during the campaign, Saenuri chairman Kim Moo-sung described homosexuality as "an outrage against humanity", urging voters to reject candidates who supported LGBTQ rights. He described Democratic assemblywoman Nam In-soon as a pro-gay advocate for supporting the revision of a military criminal law in 2013 to include men as well as women as potential victims of sexual assault. The Christian Liberal Party also rallied vociferously against LGBTQ rights and stoked Islamophobia, calling on voters to "protect our families from homosexuality and Islam".

== Opinion polls ==
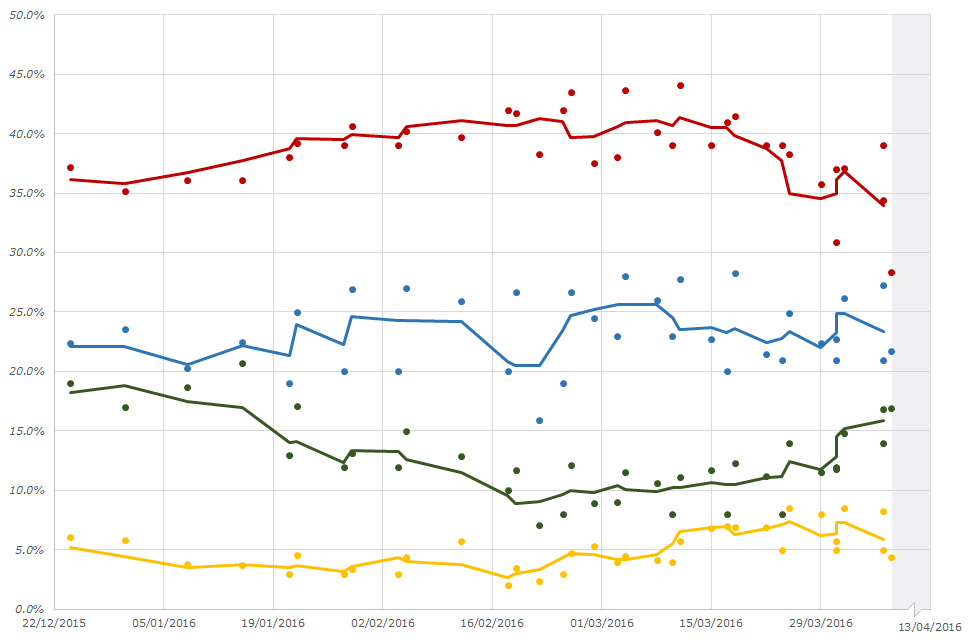
Graph of selected opinion polls for the 2016 legislative election, beginning at the end of 2015 with the first polls accounting for the new People Party. The moving average is calculated from the last three polls. Saenuri Democratic People Justice ( Poll embargo period)

Opinion polls from prior to the election had suggested the Saenuri Party would win the election outright, and were confounded by Saenuri underperformance in constituencies and the comparative success of the Democratic and People parties. The KBS exit poll on 13 April showed the Saenuri Party winning a plurality with between 121 and 143 seats, and the Democratic Party taking 101–123; other exit polls projected similar results. South Korean law had prohibited the publication of opinion polls in the week before the elections, beginning on 7 April.

Date	Polling firm	Saenuri	Democratic (Note: Known as the New Politics Alliance for Democracy until 28 December 2015.)	People	Justice	Oth.	Lead
13 Apr 2016	Election (PR)	33.5	25.5	26.7	7.2	6.9	8.0
5–7 Apr 2016	Hankook Research	28.4	21.7	16.9	4.4	5.1	6.7
4–6 Apr 2016	Gallup Korea	39	21	14	5	–	18
4–6 Apr 2016	Realmeter	34.4	27.3	16.8	8.3	4.4	7.1
28 Mar – 1 Apr 2016	Realmeter	37.1	26.2	14.8	8.5	3.8	10.9
29–31 Mar 2016	Gallup Korea	37	21	12	5	–	16
29–31 Mar 2016	Hankook Research	30.9	22.7	11.8	5.7	3.3	8.2
27–29 Mar 2016	R&Search	35.8	22.4	11.5	8.0	–	13.4
21–25 Mar 2016	Realmeter	38.3	24.9	14.0	8.5	4.0	13.4
22–24 Mar 2016	Gallup Korea	39	21	8	5	–	18
21–22 Mar 2016	R&Search	39.0	21.5	11.2	6.9	–	17.5
14–18 Mar 2016	Realmeter	41.5	28.3	12.3	6.9	3.8	13.2
15–17 Mar 2016	Gallup Korea	41	20	8	7	–	21
13–15 Mar 2016	R&Search	39.0	22.7	11.7	6.8	–	16.3
7–11 Mar 2016	Realmeter	44.1	27.8	11.1	5.7	2.2	16.3
8–10 Mar 2016	Gallup Korea	39	23	8	4	–	16
6–8 Mar 2016	R&Search	40.1	26.0	10.6	4.1	–	14.1
29 Feb, 2–4 Mar 2016	Realmeter	43.7	28.0	11.5	4.5	3.6	15.7
2–3 Mar 2016	Gallup Korea	38	23	9	4	–	15
28–29 Feb 2016	R&Search	37.5	24.5	8.9	5.3	–	13.0
22–26 Feb 2016	Realmeter	43.5	26.7	12.1	4.7	3.1	16.8
23–25 Feb 2016	Gallup Korea	42	19	8	3	–	23
21–22 Feb 2016	Hankook Research	38.3	15.9	7.1	2.4	3.2	22.4
15–19 Feb 2016	Realmeter	41.7	26.7	11.7	3.5	3.3	15.0
16–18 Feb 2016	Gallup Korea	42	20	10	2	–	22
10–12 Feb 2016	Realmeter	39.7	25.9	12.9	5.7	3.4	13.8
1–5 Feb 2016	Realmeter	40.2	27.0	15.0	4.4	3.5	13.2
2–4 Feb 2016	Gallup Korea	39	20	12	3	–	19
25–29 Jan 2016	Realmeter	40.6	26.9	13.1	3.4	3.8	13.7
26–28 Jan 2016	Gallup Korea	39	20	12	3	–	19
18–22 Jan 2016	Realmeter	39.2	25.0	17.1	4.6	3.9	14.2
19–21 Jan 2016	Gallup Korea	38	19	13	3	–	19
11–15 Jan 2016	Realmeter	36.1	22.5	20.7	3.7	4.8	13.6
4–8 Jan 2016	Realmeter	36.1	20.3	18.7	3.8	5.8	15.8
28–31 Dec 2015	Realmeter	35.2	23.6	17.3 (Note: Speculative support for "Ahn Cheol-soo's new party".)	5.8	5.0	11.6
21–24 Dec 2015	Realmeter	37.2	22.4	19.0	6.1	3.0	14.8
11 Apr 2012	Last election (PR)	42.8	36.5 (Note: Democratic United Party result.)	–	10.3 (Note: Unified Progressive Party result.)	12.9	6.3

General notes

- Gallup Korea provides poll results only to the nearest whole number.

== Results ==

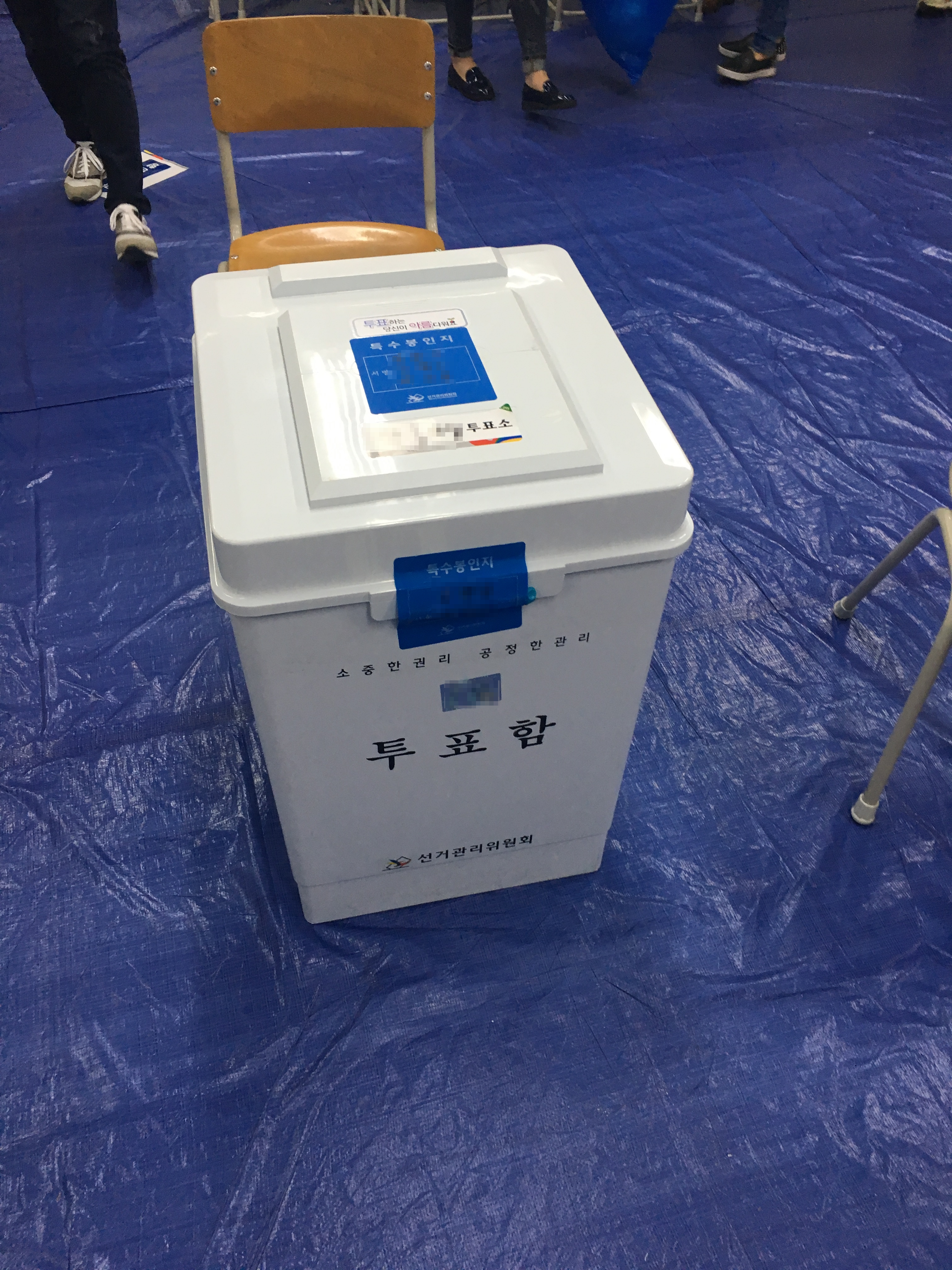
Sealed ballot box used for this election

Prior to the election, it was widely expected that the Saenuri Party would emerge victorious due to divisions in the opposition and an intensified national security climate. Speculation had focused on whether the party would be able to attain a three-fifths majority. In contrast to expectations, however, the Saenuri Party was delivered a decisive defeat, losing not only its majority but also its status as largest party in the Assembly. The Democratic Party took a one-seat plurality, and the opposition outnumbered the governing party for the first time in 16 years, while the centrist People Party also emerged as a new force in South Korean politics, holding the balance of power in the elected Assembly. The result was seen as posing significant problems for then-President Park, who was rendered unable to press forward with her legislative agenda without opposition support. News sources labelled Park a "lame duck" president, with The Chosun Ilbo saying that her "lame duck period has started earlier than any other administration in the past".

Eleven independents were elected, of whom seven were former Saenuri members who had been deselected by the party in the nominations process prior to the election: Yoo Seong-min, Joo Ho-young, Ahn Sang-soo, Yoon Sang-hyun, Kang Ghil-boo, Chang Je-won, and Lee Chul-gyu. Meanwhile, a number of high-profile Saenuri figures were defeated in the constituency elections, including Oh Se-hoon, former Mayor of Seoul, who had been positioning himself for the 2017 presidential race; senior lawmaker and former presidential candidate Lee Jae-oh; and Deputy Prime Minister and former party chairman Hwang Woo-yea.

Graph of the party split among 304 seats.
Party	Proportional			Constituency			Total seats	+/–
Party	Votes	%	Seats	Votes	%	Seats	Total seats	+/–
Saenuri Party	7,960,272	33.50	17	9,200,690	38.33	105	122	–35
People Party	6,355,572	26.75	13	3,565,451	14.85	25	38	New
Democratic Party	6,069,744	25.55	13	8,881,369	37.00	110	123	–4
Justice Party	1,719,891	7.24	4	395,357	1.65	2	6	New
Christian Liberal Party	626,853	2.64	0	1,376	0.01	0	0	New
Minjoo Party	209,872	0.88	0	17,034	0.07	0	0	New
Green Party Korea	182,301	0.77	0	31,491	0.13	0	0	0
People's United Party	145,624	0.61	0	154,402	0.64	0	0	New
Christian Democratic Party	129,978	0.55	0				0	New
Hannara Party	86,464	0.36	0	2,232	0.01	0	0	0
Labor Party	91,705	0.39	0	46,949	0.20	0	0	New
Green Buddhist Federation	31,141	0.13	0				0	New
Korea Party	27,103	0.11	0	253	0.00	0	0	New
Let's go! Peace and Human Rights Party	25,227	0.11	0				0	New
Welfare National Party	20,267	0.09	0	1,295	0.01	0	0	New
United Korean Party	16,427	0.07	0				0	New
Korean National Party	16,407	0.07	0	1,074	0.00	0	0	New
Republican Party	12,295	0.05	0	3,268	0.01	0	0	New
Employment Welfare Pension Advancement Coalition	12,143	0.05	0	2,149	0.01	0	0	New
Chinbak Yeondae	11,981	0.05	0				0	New
Pro-Ban Unification Party	9,710	0.04	0	9,394	0.04	0	0	New
Truth Party				3,251	0.01	0	0	New
Patriotic Party				846	0.00	0	0	New
Pro-Peace Peace Unification Party				519	0.00	0	0	New
National Anti-Corruption Party				492	0.00	0	0	New
Republic of Korea Party				264	0.00	0	0	New
Independents				1,683,264	7.01	11	11	+8
Total	23,760,977	100.00	47	24,002,420	100.00	253	300	0
Valid votes	23,760,977	97.26		24,002,420	98.53			
Invalid/blank votes	669,769	2.74		358,336	1.47			
Total votes	24,430,746	100.00		24,360,756	100.00			
Registered voters/turnout	42,100,398	58.03		41,893,936	58.15			
Source: NEC

=== By city/province ===
The table below lists constituency totals and list vote percentages in each region. Since the election was run under a parallel voting system, electors could choose to vote for one party in their constituencies while voting for another party's national list. Exit polls indicated that 12.9% of those who had voted for the Saenuri Party in their constituencies and 20.8% of those for the Democratic Party supported the People Party list.

Constituency results by city/province
Region	Saenuri		DPK		PP		JP		Ind.		Total seats
Region	Seats	%	Seats	%	Seats	%	Seats	%	Seats	%	Total seats
Seoul	12	36.8	35	43.0	2	16.0	0	0.7	0	2.7	49
Busan	12	47.8	5	38.4	0	5.0	0	1.5	1	7.2	18
Daegu	8	47.9	1	18.8	0	0.7	0	0.8	3	28.3	12
Incheon	4	35.3	7	34.9	0	18.6	0	3.6	2	7.3	13
Gwangju	0	2.2	0	34.1	8	56.3	0	1.6	0	2.6	8
Daejeon	3	38.4	4	43.6	0	15.1	0	1.7	0	0.9	7
Ulsan	3	38.5	0	16.5	0	4.8	–		3	35.6	6
Sejong	0	10.6	0	36.0	0	8.3	–		1	43.7	1
Gyeonggi	19	39.2	40	42.7	0	14.2	1	2.2	1	1.1	60
Gangwon	6	47.7	1	35.3	0	2.0	0	1.0	1	13.2	8
North Chungcheong	5	48.0	3	41.9	0	7.7	0	0.4	0	1.4	8
South Chungcheong	6	41.4	5	42.1	0	10.3	0	0.3	0	5.7	11
North Jeolla	1	9.8	2	38.8	7	42.2	0	1.4	0	7.2	10
South Jeolla	1	11.6	1	38.1	8	43.8	0	1.1	0	3.0	10
North Gyeongsang	13	60.9.	0	8.2	0	1.0	0	3.1	0	23.0	13
South Gyeongsang	12	48.5	3	31.5	0	4.1	1	4.2	0	11.1	16
Jeju	0	41.4	3	48.6	0	9.7	–		–		3
Total	105	38.3	110	37.0	25	14.9	2	1.6	11	7.0	253

Party list vote results by city/province
Region	Saenuri	DPK	PP	JP	Other
Seoul	30.8	25.9	28.8	8.5	6.0
Busan	41.2	26.6	20.3	6.0	5.9
Daegu	53.1	16.3	17.4	6.1	7.1
Incheon	33.4	25.4	26.9	7.5	6.8
Gwangju	2.9	28.6	53.3	7.3	7.9
Daejeon	31.0	28.2	27.1	7.6	6.1
Ulsan	36.7	22.8	21.1	8.7	10.7
Sejong	28.6	28.5	26.6	8.9	7.4
Gyeonggi	32.3	26.8	27.0	7.8	6.1
Gangwon	43.4	23.9	19.3	5.7	7.7
North Chungcheong	38.6	27.6	21.4	5.6	6.8
South Chungcheong	37.0	27.1	22.5	5.6	7.8
North Jeolla	7.6	32.3	42.8	8.1	9.2
South Jeolla	5.7	30.0	47.8	5.8	10.7
North Gyeongsang	58.1	12.9	14.8	5.2	9.0
South Gyeongsang	44.0	24.4	17.4	6.5	7.7
Jeju	35.0	29.6	22.4	7.0	6.0
Overall total	33.5	25.5	26.7	7.2	7.0
Seat allocation	17	13	13	4	0

== Aftermath ==
The day after the election, Saenuri chairman Kim Moo-sung tendered his resignation over his party's defeat, saying that he would "take responsibility for the resounding defeat in the general elections"; Kim Tae-ho, a member of the party's Supreme Council, and secretary-general Hwang Jin-ha also announced their resignation. After the mass resignation of the party leadership, the party established an emergency committee led by floor leader Won Yoo-chul to lead the party on an interim basis. In order to regain the party's plurality in the Assembly, Won announced that Saenuri would receive independent lawmakers who had previously been deselected by the party back into its ranks. Ahn Sang-soo, one of the deselected candidates who had re-entered the Assembly as an independent, declared his desire to rejoin the party, while another, Yoo Seong-min, stated that he would rejoin at an appropriate time.

President Park stated on 18 April that she "humbly accepted" the election result, and would "closely cooperate with the new National Assembly". A survey conducted in the two days following the election showed Park's approval rating falling to 31.5 percent, her lowest ratings in office yet and 8.1 percentage points down from the week before the election.

The election was seen to have a limited effect on the Korean stock market, since the prospect of a hung parliament appeared to diminish the chance of ambitious economic policies being implemented. Nonetheless, on a more limited scale, the performance of companies tied to prominent figures reflected the election results: shares in AhnLab, Inc., whose founder and largest stakeholder is People Party co-chairman Ahn Cheol-soo, had risen 5.2% by 2 p.m. KST on 14 April following Ahn's election success, while textile company Chonbang, chaired by Kim Moo-sung's brother, fell 19.2% in the same time frame.

== See also ==
- List of members of the National Assembly (South Korea), 2016–2020
