= Yoon Sang-hyun (politician) =

South Korean politician (born 1962)

- 윤상현
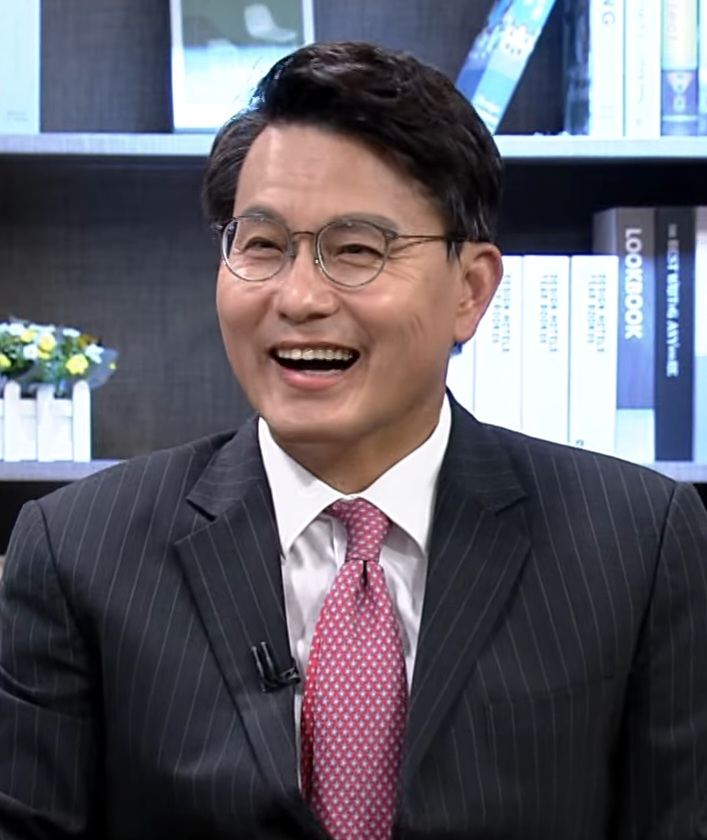
- Yoon in 2023

Member of the National Assembly
- Incumbent
- Assumed office 30 May 2008
- Preceded by: Ahn Young-geun
- Constituency: Nam B (Incheon, 2008–2020); Dong–Michuhol B (Incheon, 2020–present)

Senior Secretary to the President for Political Affairs
- In office 2 February 2015 – 10 October 2015
- President: Park Geun-hye

Personal details
- Born: 1 December 1962 (age 63) Cheongyang County, South Chungcheong Province, South Korea
- Spouse(s): Jeon Hyo-sun (m. 1985; div. 2005) Shin Kyung-ah (m. 2010)
- Children: 3
- Education: Seoul National University (BA); Georgetown University (MA); George Washington University (PhD)
- Occupation: Politician
- Website: blog.naver.com/shoon1962

Korean name
- Hangul: 윤상현
- Hanja: 尹相鉉
- RR: Yun Sanghyeon
- MR: Yun Sanghyŏn

Yoon Sang-hyun (Korean: 윤상현; born 1 December 1962) is a South Korean politician. He has served as a member of the National Assembly of South Korea for the 18th through 22nd terms (2008–present), representing districts in Incheon. He is currently the representative for Incheon's Dong-gu–Michuhol-gu B. A five-term lawmaker, Yoon previously served as a special advisor on political affairs in the Presidential Secretariat in 2015. He was formerly the son-in-law of former President Chun Doo-hwan (married to Chun's daughter from 1985 to 2005) and is currently the nephew-in-law of Shin Kyuk-ho, founder of Lotte Corporation.

== Academic career ==
Yoon was a visiting researcher at the Korea Institute at Harvard University in 1995. He served as a visiting assistant professor at the Paul H. Nitze School of Advanced International Studies at Johns Hopkins University.

He was an adjunct professor at Seoul National University from 1998 to 2002.

== Political career ==
Yoon entered politics in 2000 with the Grand National Party. He unsuccessfully ran for the National Assembly in 2004. He was elected in 2008 and re-elected in 2012, 2016, 2020, and 2024.

He served as spokesperson for the Grand National Party (2008–2009), deputy floor leader (2013–2014) and secretary general (2014) of the Saenuri Party. From February to October 2015, he was Senior Secretary to the President for Political Affairs under Park Geun-hye. He chaired the Foreign Affairs and Unification Committee from 2018 to 2020.

As of 2025, Yoon serves on the Environment and Labor Committee and the Foreign Affairs and Unification Committee. He chairs the People Power Party's Protestant association.

During the 2024 South Korean martial law crisis, Yoon opposed the impeachment of President Yoon Suk Yeol, calling the martial law declaration a "high-level political act".

== Election results ==
Year	Elections	Constituency	Political party	Votes (%)	Results
2004	17th National Assembly General Election	Nam B (Incheon)	GNP	41,991 (45.79%)	Defeated (2nd)
2008	18th National Assembly General Election	Nam B (Incheon)	GNP	40,670 (58.06%)	Won
2012	19th National Assembly General Election	Nam B (Incheon)	Saenuri	50,514 (57.97%)	Won
2016	20th National Assembly General Election	Nam B (Incheon)	Independent	44,784 (48.10%)	Won
2020	21st National Assembly General Election	Dong–Michuhol B (Incheon)	Independent	46,493 (40.59%)	Won
2024	22nd National Assembly General Election	Dong–Michuhol B (Incheon)	PPP	58,730 (50.44%)	Won

== Personal life ==
Yoon married Jeon Hyo-sun, daughter of former president Chun Doo-hwan, in 1985. They had two daughters and divorced in 2005.

In 2010, Yoon married Shin Kyung-ah, niece of Lotte Group founder Shin Kyuk-ho. They have one daughter.

Yoon resides in Michuhol District, Incheon. He is a Protestant.
