= Liberal Democratic Party (South Korea) =

Political party in South Korea

- Leader: Kim Byung-kwan (ERC)
- Founded: 6 March 2021
- Registered: 15 March 2021
- Merged into: Free Korea 21; Liberal Party
- Headquarters: 75, Keunumul-ro, Mapo-gu, Seoul
- Membership (2024): 12,753
- Ideology: Radical anti-communism Conservatism (South Korean)
- Political position: Far-right
- Colors: Blue
- National Assembly: 0 / 300
- Metropolitan Mayors and Governors: 0 / 16
- Municipal Mayors: 0 / 227
- Provincial and Metropolitan Councillors: 0 / 933
- Municipal Councillors: 0 / 3,034

Korean name
- Hangul: 자유민주당
- Hanja: 自由民主黨
- RR: Jayu minjudang
- MR: Chayu minjudang

The Liberal Democratic Party (Korean: 자유민주당) is a New Right South Korean political party founded on 15 March 2021.

== Outline ==
The party was founded on 6 March 2021, following a press conference held by figures including Jang Gyu-jae, Kim Dae-ho, Ryu Seok-chun and Choi In-sik. Declaring the launch of a party provisionally named the "Reform, Freedom, and Responsibility Party," they stated, "The Moon Jae-in administration—which styles itself as a democratic, progressive force—is destroying the Republic of Korea through ignorance, anachronism, arrogance, self-righteousness, hypocrisy, and falsehoods. The situation cannot be halted by existing parties like the People Power Party—a self-proclaimed liberal-conservative party that effectively acts as a 'second company' to the Democratic Party of Korea."

The Preparatory Committee for the Reform, on 11 November 2020, announced its intention to participate in the 2021 South Korean by-elections. The name was later changed to the "Reform Freedom Union." On 17 December 2020, Jang Gyu-jae announced his candidacy for the Busan mayoral by-election, followed by Kim Dae-ho, who announced his bid for the Seoul mayoral by-election on 29 December 2020. On 15 March 2021, the party was officially founded under the name "Liberal Democratic Party" through a merger with the Free Korea 21 a conservative party led by former Foundation for Broadcast Culture Chairman Ko Young-ju, and the Liberal Party a right-wing party founded by Son Sang-yoon, CEO of Newstown.

The LDP supports a historical negationist view of the comfort women issue and the Gwangju uprising.

== Election results ==
=== National Assembly elections ===
Year	Election	Constituency seats		Proportional representation		Total seats	
		Seats won	Vote share	Seats won	Vote share	Seats won	Seat share
2024	22nd	0/254	0%	0/46	0.14%	0/300	0%
