= Open Democratic Party (2020) =

Political party in South Korea

Open Democratic Party 열린민주당
- Abbreviation: ODP
- Leader: Choi Kang-wook
- Founder: Chung Bong-ju
- Founded: March 8, 2020
- Dissolved: January 14, 2022
- Split from: Democratic Party of Korea
- Merged into: Democratic Party of Korea
- Succeeded by: Open Democratic Party (factions)
- Headquarters: Yeongdeungpo, Seoul
- Ideology: Liberalism (South Korean)
- Political position: Centre to centre-left
- Colours: Blue

Website
- openminjoo.org (archived)

The Open Democratic Party (Korean: 열린민주당) was a liberal political party in South Korea formed on 8 March 2020. The party was absorbed back into the Democratic Party of Korea on 14 January 2022.

== History ==
On 28 February 2020, Chung Bong-ju, a former Democratic MP, announced his intention to form a new party. He had initially launched his bid to run for Seoul Gangseo A constituency for 2020 election under the Democratic banner but was disqualified by the party due to controversies including sexual harassment. He, however, declared not to run for the election.

Lee Keun-shik, the then-leader of the group, harshly criticized the United Future Party (UFP) for establishing its satellite party, the Future Korea Party (FKP), in order to overcome the new electoral law granting proportional seats. He denounced the UFP's action as "immoral" while emphasising they will stop the UFP-FKP duo to win the election.

Sohn Hye-won, an independent MP who had quit the Democratic Party, announced they would join this party.

On 8 March 2020, the party was officially formed and elected Lee Keun-shik as its president.

The party gained only three seats, much less than expectations. Lee resigned on 19 April in order to take responsibility of the party's defeat. On 12 May 2020, Choi Kang-wook was elected as the new president of the party.

On 26 December 2021, it was announced that the Open Democratic Party had agreed to unify with the Democratic Party, with the latter remaining the party name. The Democratic Party leaders agreed to accept all the conditions suggested by the Open Democratic Party. The process was expected to be completed in January 2022.

On 14 January 2022, the Open Democratic Party and its 3 proportional representative members of Parliament was fully absorbed into the Democratic Party of Korea.

== Political positions ==
The party had criticised the Democratic Party for adopting a more conservative approach in recent years. However, Sohn Hye-won said that the party welcomed both conservatives and progressives, should they have wished to join.

== Election results ==
Election	Leader	Constituency			Party list			Seats	Position	Status
Election	Leader	Votes	%	Seats	Votes	%	Seats	Seats	Position	Status
2020	Lee Keun-shik				1,512,763	5.4	3 / 47	3 / 300	5th	Opposition

== Logos ==
Temporary logo of the Open Democratic Party

Logo of the Open Democratic Party

Alternate orientation of the Open Democratic Party
