= Choe Kang-wook =

South Korean politician

- 최강욱
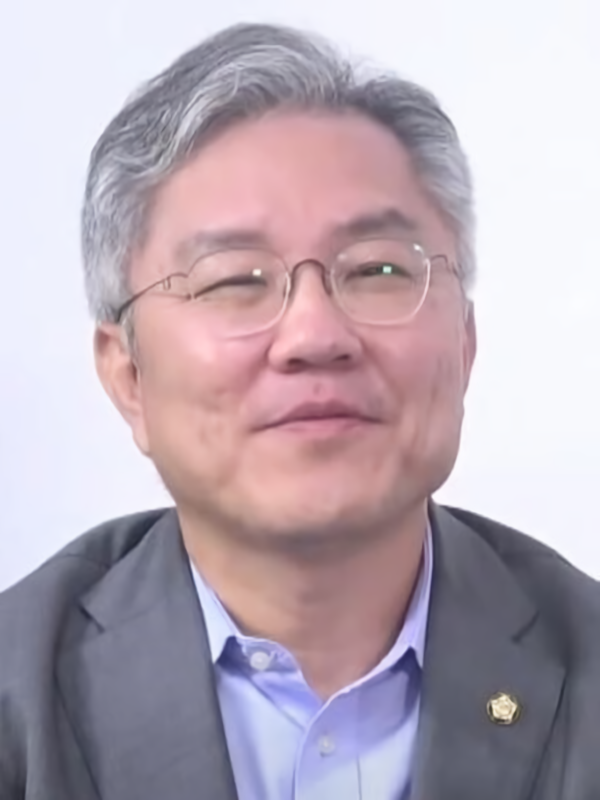

President of the Open Democratic Party
- In office 12 May 2020 – 18 January 2022; Acting: 19 April 2020 – 12 May 2020
- Preceded by: Lee Keun-shik
- Succeeded by: Position abolished

Member of the National Assembly
- In office 30 May 2020 – 18 September 2023
- Constituency: Proportional

Secretary to the President for Public Office Discipline
- In office 7 September 2018 – 16 March 2020
- President: Moon Jae-in
- Preceded by: Kim Jong-ho
- Succeeded by: Lee Nam-koo

Personal details
- Born: 24 March 1968 (age 58) Namwon, North Jeolla, South Korea
- Party: Democratic Party (suspended)
- Other political affiliations: ODP (2020–2022)
- Children: 4
- Relatives: Choi Myung-hee (aunt); Chung Nam-ki (relative)
- Education: Seoul National University
- Occupation: Lawyer, politician
- Criminal charges: Obstruction of business
- Criminal penalty: 8 month sentence

Korean name
- Hangul: 최강욱
- Hanja: 崔康旭
- RR: Choe Ganguk
- MR: Ch'oe Kanguk

Choe Kang-wook (Korean: 최강욱; born 24 March 1968) is a South Korean lawyer and politician who was the former President of the Open Democratic Party (ODP) from 2020 to 2022. He served as the Secretary to the President for Public Office Discipline from September 2018 to March 2020. In the 2020 election, he was elected as a Member of the National Assembly. In September 2023, the Supreme Court of Korea removed him from office as a member of the National Assembly after it upheld his sentence of a suspended eight month prison term for his involvement in forging a fake internship certificate for the son of the Justice Minister Cho Kuk.

== Early life and education ==
Choe was born in Namwon, North Jeolla in 1968 but was grown in Boseong and Yeosu in South Jeolla. He attended Jeolla High School in Jeonju and studied law at Seoul National University. His aunt, Choi Myung-hee, is a novelist known for Honbul. He is also a nephew-in-law to Chung Nam-ki, the former CEO of the Korea Press Foundation. His father is still living in Namwon.

== Career ==
=== Military judicial officer ===
He was qualified for the bar for military judicial officer in 1994. Prior to be transferred to major in 2005, he was the Staff Judge Advocate (SJA) of the 3rd Cops, Chief Prosecutor of the Prosecutors Office Ministry of National Defence and the Deputy Chief of the High Public Prosecutor's Office.

He took a prominent role in 2004 when he led an investigation against corruption scandals within the military. In January, he arrested and charged the then Deputy Commander of R.O.K.-U.S. Combined Forces Command Shin Il-soon for being alleged to embezzle the troop budget and public funds. The investigation was also brought to a bribery occurred at a promotion to general, in which led the then Chief of Army Staff Nam Jae-jun to resign in November. His resignation was, however, rejected by the then President Roh Moo-hyun.

=== Lawyer ===
After being discharged in 2005, Choe worked as a lawyer, mainly focusing human rights issues within the military. He co-founded the Cheongmaek law firm. He was an ombudsman at the Defence Acquisition Programme Administration, an expert member in human rights education at the National Human Rights Commission and a member of the Special Committee on Ethics of the National Assembly. In 2008, he filed a constitutional appeal for an issue of "seditious books" by the Ministry of National Defence.

He used to be a member of the Lawyers for a Democratic Society following the recommendation of Lee Jung-hee. He was also in charge for a trial related to civilian inspection of Lee Myung-bak's government.

=== Foundation for Broadcast Culture ===
Choe became a member of board of directors (BoD) of the Foundation for Broadcast Culture from August 2012 to 2018. In 2012, he and other 2 BoD members — Seon Dong-kyu and Kwon Mi-hyuk, criticised that the dismissal proposal against the CEO of MBC, Kim Jae-chul, was failed due to governmental pressure.

=== Secretary to the President for Public Office Discipline ===
On 5 September 2018, Choe was appointed the Secretary to the President for Public Office Discipline, replacing Kim Jong-ho who was moved to the Secretary-General of the Board of Audit and Inspection.

=== Member of the National Assembly ===
He resigned on 16 March 2020. However, sources reported that he would run for the upcoming general election as a proportional representation as the date was the deadline for any civil servants to resign in order to run for the election. At the beginning he denied it, but 2 days later he was reported he had already registered as a pre-candidate of the Open Democratic Party (ODP). He was selected 2nd in the ODP list and was elected.

On 19 April, Choe was appointed the interim President of the ODP following the resignation of the incumbent Lee Keun-shik due to the poor performance in the election. Being the sole candidate running for the party's presidency, he was elected the ODP President on 12 May with the support of 99.6%.

On 26 December 2021, both the Democratic Party and the ODP agreed to merge each other, under the name of the "Democratic Party of Korea". The ODP was later merged into the Democratic Party on 18 January 2022. As a part of the agreement, Choe became one of the vice presidents of the Democratic Party.

==== Cho Won Fake Internship Certificate Scandal ====
In 2017, Choe helped to write a fake internship certificate for the former Minister of Justice Cho Kuk's son, Cho Won. The internship certificate stated that from January 2017 until October 2017, Cho Won had worked a total of sixteen hours, coming to work 2 days a week. The internship certificate helped Cho Won apply and be admitted into the Yonsei University Graduate School, and receive a master's degree in political science. Choe denied it, insisting that the ex-Justice Minister's son had really completed his internship course and therefore the certificate was genuine. He also added that the prosecution threatened him to attend, otherwise they would reveal his real name in public. However, Kyunghyang Shinmun reported that while he was a lawyer, he once represented Cho Kuk's wife Chung Kyung-shim during a case of property succession. Before that, according to JoongAng Ilbo, he was in charge of personnel verification of Cho Kuk during the time of his appointment.

On 7 January 2020, the Liberty Korea Party filed a lawsuit against Choe for obstruction and breaching the Anti-graft Law. 16 days later, he was charged by the prosecution. On 22 April, he was again sued by a civic organisation for bribery.

On 28 January 2021, Choe was sentenced to a suspended 8 month prison sentence with a stay of execution for 2 years for the crime of obstruction of business by the Seoul Central District Court. The judge, Jeong Jong-geon, stated according to the claims of the fake internship certificate, Cho Won would have worked an average of twelve minutes for every time he visited the office. He also stated that the employees at the law firm had never seen Cho Won working regularly as an intern. On 18 September 2023, the Supreme Court upheld the Seoul Central District Court's verdict.

On 18 September 2023, he was removed from office as a member of the National Assembly in accordance with the Public Official Election Act and the National Assembly Act, due to receiving a prison sentence for his involvement in Cho Won's fake internship certificate.

=== Suspension from Democratic Party ===
During a book publishing event on November 19, 2023, Choe made a sexist comment, referring to the South Korean First Lady Kim Keon-hee as an amkeot (Korean: 암컷; lit. 'female animal'). He was criticized by both members of the ruling People Power Party and his own party, the Democratic Party. The Korean National Council of Women called on Choe to apologize for his derogatory remarks. On November 22, the Democratic Party suspended Choe Kang-wook's party membership for six months in response.

== Controversies ==
=== Channel A broadcaster transcript ===
On 3 April 2020, Choe revealed a recorded transcript of Lee Dong-jae, a broadcaster of Channel A, on his Facebook.

Dear Mr Lee, it's ok if it's not true.
Just tell people you gave money to Rhyu Si-min if you wanna survive. That's all...

On 10 April, the full recorded transcript was revealed. Nevertheless, 3 days later, Lee Bo-kyung, a worker of MBC, posted on her Facebook that the transcript disclosed by Choe was not true.

== Election results ==
=== General elections ===
Year	Elections	Constituency	Political party	Votes (%)	Remarks
2020	21st National Assembly General Election	PR (2nd)	Open Democratic	1,512,763 (5.42%)	Elected
