= Won Yoo-chul =

South Korean politician (born 1962)

- 원유철
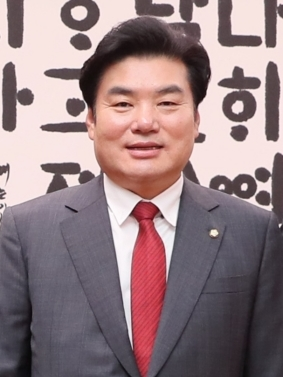
- Won Yoo-Chul in 2020

President of the Future Korea Party
- In office 20 March 2020 – 29 May 2020
- Preceded by: Han Sun-kyo
- Succeeded by: Position abolished

President of the Saenuri Party (acting)
- In office 14 April 2016 – 10 May 2016
- Preceded by: Kim Moo-sung
- Succeeded by: Chung Jin-suk (acting)

Member of the National Assembly for Pyeongtaek A (Gyeonggi)
- In office 30 May 2008 – 29 May 2020
- Preceded by: Woo Je-hang
- Succeeded by: Hong Ki-won
- In office 30 May 1996 – 29 May 2004
- Preceded by: Kim Young-kwang (as Songtan-Pyeongtaek, Gyeonggi)
- Succeeded by: Woo Je-hang

Member of the Gyeonggi Provincial Council
- In office 1 July 1991 – 30 June 1995
- Constituency: Songtan 1st

Personal details
- Born: 25 October 1962 (age 64) Pyeongtaek, South Korea
- Party: People Power
- Other political affiliations: RDP (1987–1990); DLP (1990–1991, 1995); Independent (1991–1995, 1996); NKP (1996, 1996–1997); Independent (1997, 2002, 2020); NNP (1997–1998); NCNP (1998–2000); MDP (2000–2002); GNP (2002–2012); Saenuri (2012–2017); LKP (2017–2020); UFP (2020); Future Korea (2020)
- Spouse: Serena Seo
- Children: 3 (including Won Kook-je)
- Education: Korea University
- Occupation: Politician

- Won Yoo-chul
- Hangul: 원유철
- Hanja: 元裕哲
- RR: Won Yucheol
- MR: Wŏn Yuch'ŏl

Won Yoo-chul (Korean: 원유철; born October 25, 1962) is a South Korean politician. He has a bachelor's degree in philosophy from Korea University. He is currently a member of the 19th National Assembly and the floor leader of Saenuri Party. On April 14, 2016, he was appointed interim leader of the party after its defeat in the 2016 general elections.

== Election results ==
=== General elections ===
Year	Elections	Constituency	Political party	Votes (%)	Results
1996	15th National Assembly General Election	Pyeongtaek A (Gyeonggi)	Independent	24,935 (40.16%)	Won
2000	16th National Assembly General Election	Pyeongtaek A (Gyeonggi)	MDP	20,884 (32.73%)	Won
2004	17th National Assembly General Election	Pyeongtaek A (Gyeonggi)	GNP	27,644 (40.74%)	Defeated (2nd)
2008	18th National Assembly General Election	Pyeongtaek A (Gyeonggi)	GNP	32,051 (50.76%)	Won
2012	19th National Assembly General Election	Pyeongtaek A (Gyeonggi)	Saenuri	42,031 (60.25%)	Won
2016	20th National Assembly General Election	Pyeongtaek A (Gyeonggi)	Saenuri	42,503 (55.48%)	Won

=== Local elections ===
==== Gyeonggido Assembly ====
Year	Elections	Constituency	Political party	Votes (%)	Remarks
1991	1991 Iocal Election	Songtan 1st	Independent	7,777 (39.70%)	Won
