= Korea Party =

Political party in South Korea

- Abbreviation: Anti-Communist Party Korea; Anti-communist Korea Party anti-communist party
- Leader: Ryu Seung-goo
- Founded: November 13, 2012
- Headquarters: 432, Jinheung-ro, Jongno-gu, Seoul; 249, Gugi-dong, Jongno-gu, Seoul
- Membership (2024): 5,363
- Ideology: Anti-communism; Korean nationalism
- Political position: Right-wing to far-right
- Colors: Maroon
- National Assembly: 0 / 300
- Metropolitan Mayors and Governors: 0 / 16
- Municipal Mayors: 0 / 227
- Provincial and Metropolitan Councillors: 0 / 933
- Municipal Councillors: 0 / 3,034

Website
- gokr.kr

Korean name
- Hangul: 가나반공정당코리아
- RR: Gana bangong jeongdang Koria
- MR: Kana pan'gong chŏngdang K'oria

The Korea Party (Korean: 가나반공정당코리아) is a political party in South Korea.

It was founded on 13 November 2012. It participated in the 2016 South Korean legislative election but failed to secure any seats.

Subsequently in the 2020 South Korean legislative election, the party campaigned on a platform of South Korea-led unification, specifically unification through northward expansion or absorption, but failed to win any seats.

== Election results ==
=== National Assembly elections ===
Year	Election	Constituency seats		Proportional representation		Total	
		Seats won	Vote share	Seats won	Vote share	Seats won	Vote share
2016	20th	0/253	0%	0/47	0.11%	0/300	0%
2020	21st	0/253	0%	0/47	0.12%	0/300	0%
2024	22nd	0/254	0%	0/46	0.02%	0/300	0%

=== Local elections ===
Year	Election	Metropolitan mayor and provincial governor		Municipal mayor		Metropolitan council		Municipal council	
		Seats won	Vote share	Seats won	Vote share	Seats won	Vote share	Seats won	Vote share
2014	6th	0/17	0%	0/226	0%	0/789	0%	0/2898	0%
2018	7th	0/17	0%	0/226	0%	0/824	0%	0/2927	0%
2022	8th	0/17	0%	0/226	0%	0/872	0%	0/2988	0%
