= Lee Keun-shik =

South Korean politician (born 1946)

- 이근식

President of the Open Democratic Party
- In office 8 March 2020 – 19 April 2020
- Preceded by: Position established
- Succeeded by: Choi Kang-wook

Member of the National Assembly
- In office 30 May 2004 – 29 May 2008
- Preceded by: Kim Sung-soon (Songpa B, Seoul)
- Succeeded by: Kim Sung-soon
- Constituency: Songpa C (Seoul)

Minister of Interior
- In office 26 March 2001 – 26 February 2003
- President: Kim Dae-jung; Roh Moo-hyun
- Prime Minister: Lee Han-dong; Chang Sang (acting); Jeon Yoon-chul (acting); Chang Dae-hwan (acting); Kim Suk-soo
- Preceded by: Choi In-ki
- Succeeded by: Kim Doo-kwan

Deputy Minister of Home Affairs
- In office 6 March 1997 – 3 March 1998
- President: Kim Young-sam; Kim Dae-jung
- Prime Minister: Goh Kun; Kim Jong-pil (acting)
- Preceded by: Chung Tae-soo
- Succeeded by: Seok Young-chul (as Deputy Minister of Interior)

Deputy Governor of South Gyeongsang
- In office 21 October 1994 – 14 July 1995
- Governor: Kim Hyuk-kyu
- Preceded by: Chin Man-hyun
- Succeeded by: Chung Chae-ryoong

Mayor of Geoje
- In office 17 December 1983 – 16 September 1985
- Preceded by: Park Chang-ki
- Succeeded by: Ha Il-chung

Personal details
- Born: 10 February 1946 (age 80) Goseong, South Gyeongsang, South Korea
- Party: Democratic
- Other political affiliations: NCNP (1998–2000); MDP (2000–2003); Independent (2003, 2007, 2008, 2012, 2012–2014, 2020); Uri (2003–2007); CRUNP (2007); CUDP (2007); GUNDP (2007–2008); UDP (2008); GNP (2008–2012); Saenuri (2012); DUP (2012); NPAD (2014–2015); Democratic (2015) (2015–2020); ODP (2020–2022); Democratic (2015) (2022–)
- Spouse: Huh Wee-soon
- Children: 3
- Education: Seoul National University
- Occupation: Politician

Lee Keun-shik (Korean: 이근식, born 10 February 1946) is a South Korean politician.

Born in Goseong, South Gyeongsang, Lee studied law at Seoul National University. After passing the Civil Service Examination in 1971, he started his career at the Economic Planning Board (now as the Ministry of Economy and Finance). He served as the mayor of Geoje, Deputy Governor of South Gyeongsang, Secretary to the President for Civil Affairs, Deputy Minister of Home Affairs and Minister of Interior. He was also the one-term Member of the National Assembly from 2004 to 2008.

Lee had received an honorary degree from Samarkand State Institute of Foreign Languages in Uzbekistan. On 8 March 2020, he was elected as the President of the Open Democratic Party. He resigned on 19 April following the party's poor performance in 2020 election.

== Election results ==
Year	Elections	Constituency	Political party	Votes (%)	Remarks
2000	16th National Assembly General Election	Tongyeong–Goseong (South Gyeongsang)	MDP	9,027 (9.72%)	Defeated (4th)
2004	17th National Assembly General Election	Songpa C (Seoul)	Uri	41,205 (38.23%)	Won
