= Free Korea 21 =

2016–2021 political party in South Korea

Free Korea 21 자유한국21
- Abbreviation: KEP
- President: Choi Jong-ho; Kim Kyung-se
- Founded: 14 March 2016
- Registered: 21 March 2016
- Dissolved: 6 March 2021
- Merged into: Liberal Democratic Party
- Headquarters: Hanseo River Park 1512, Yeouiseo-ro, Yeouido-dong, Yeongdeungpo, Seoul
- Membership (2018): 6,834
- Ideology: Conservatism (South Korean)
- Colours: Blue; Historical: Orange

Website
- http://www.k-ecoparty.kr/

Free Korea 21 (Korean: 자유한국21) was a conservative political party in South Korea led by Choi Jong-ho and Kim Kyung-se.

== History ==
The party was founded as the Pro-Ban Unification Party (친반통일당) on 14 March 2016, in order to endorse the-then Secretary-General of the United Nations Ban Ki-moon for the upcoming presidential election. In 2016 election, the party nominated 6 candidates — 2 for constituencies (including the former Cheongju Mayor Han Dae-soo) and 4 for proportional representations, in which no one was elected.

Following the election defeat, it changed its name to the Pro-Ban Nation Hope Union (친반국민희망연합) on 29 November. It again changed to the Party for National Hope (국민희망당) on 31 January 2017 shortly after Ban declared to not seek for the presidential election. On 13 April, it then adopted a new name Economic Patriots (Korean: 경제애국당), with electing the President of Haha Group Oh Young-guk as its presidential candidate. Oh received 6,040 votes (0.01%), making him as the candidate with the fewest votes since 1948.

The party then reverted its former name on 29 October 2019 and again to the Korea Economic Party (Korean: 한국경제당) on 2 March 2020 as a "refoundation". Prior to the 2020 election, the Gangnam 3rd MP Lee Eun-jae, joined this party, making the party with a parliamentary representation. Lee, who was elected under the Saenuri (then United Future Party) banner in 2016, joined the Christian Liberal Unification Party (CLUP) after lost at preselection. However, she also withdrew from the CLUP following her elimination due to her Buddhist identity.

After the party did not gain any seats in the election, sources reported that Lee had already exited from the party.

The party was renamed to Free Korea 21 on 14 December 2020, and voted to merge into the new Freedom and Democratic Party on 6 March 2021.

== Policies ==
The party describes itself as "centre-right" and critical of the United Future Party. Originally a pro-Ban party, it has renounced its pro-Ban stance in 2017.

=== 2016 election manifesto ===
For the 2016 election, the party promised a constitutional amendment, from the 5-year non-renewable presidential system to the American-style 4-year renewable presidential system with reinstating the vice presidency.

=== 2017 presidential election manifesto ===
Following are a part of the manifestos of Oh Young-guk.

- Building South Korea as the leading country of Northeast Asia
- Building the "Korean identity" by ethnic integration and stopping wars
- Recover all credit delinquers
- Pardoning all imprisoned criminals, as well as removing all criminal records 3 years from the enforcement ends (not applicable for brutal crimes i.e. murder, rape, robbery and assault)

=== 2020 election manifesto ===
For the 2020 election, the party promised to overcome the coronavirus pandemic, adopting it as its "1st manifesto".

== Election results ==
=== President ===
Election	Candidate	Votes	%	Result
2017	Oh Young-guk	6,040	0.02	Not elected

=== Legislature ===
Election	Leader	Constituency		Party list		Seats		Position	Status
Election	Leader	Votes	%	Votes	%	No.	+/–	Position	Status
2016	Lee Moon-yong	9,394	0.04	9,710	0.04	0 / 300	new	21st	Extra-parliamentary
2020	Choi Jong-ho; Kim Kyung-se			48,807	0.17	0 / 300	0	18th	Extra-parliamentary

== Logos ==
Logo of the Korea Economic Party

Logo of the Free Korea 21
