= Future Korea Party =

2020 political party in South Korea

Future Korea Party 미래한국당
- Abbreviation: FKP
- Founder: Han Sun-kyo
- Founded: 5 February 2020
- Dissolved: 29 May 2020
- Split from: Liberty Korea Party; New Conservative Party
- Merged into: United Future Party
- Succeeded by: People Future Party (de facto)
- Ideology: Conservatism (South Korean); South Korean nationalism
- Political position: Right-wing to far-right
- National affiliation: United Future Party
- Colours: Pink

Website
- miraehanguk.co.kr

United Future Party
- Hangul: 미래한국당
- Hanja: 未來韓國黨
- RR: Mirae Hangukdang
- MR: Mirae Han'guktang

The Future Korea Party (Korean: 미래한국당, stylised as Future KOREA Party) was a political party in South Korea formed on 5 February 2020.

== History ==
The party was formed as a satellite party to the Liberty Korea Party (LKP) in order to run for the proportional seats in the 2020 elections, taking advantage of the new electoral law. The party chose the name of Proportional Liberty Korea Party (Korean: 비례자유한국당), emphasizing their relationship with the LKP. However, the National Election Commission disallowed parties from using "Proportional" (비례) in their names, which forced the party to adopt the current name. The party chose "Future (미래 Mirae)" that is pronounced similar to "Proportional (비례 Birye)".

On 5 February 2020, the party took the official formation convention and elected Han Sun-kyo as its president by acclamation, while Cho Hun-hyun was named the Secretary-General. All of its MPs were originally LKP MPs who declared they would not seek re-election at the 2020 election. Once the LKP combined forces with the New Conservative Party (NCP) and formed the United Future Party (UFP), one NCP MP also joined the Future Korea Party.

The party, however, soon faced a conflict with the UFP due to issues related to candidate selection for the upcoming general election, which led the party leadership to collapse on 19 March. The next day, former UFP MP Won Yoo-chul was elected as the new president, and started the candidate selection process all over again.

Following the 2020 elections, discussions were underway to merge or absorb the Future Korea Party back into the United Future Party, as its original task of obtaining new compensatory proportional seats in the election was complete. On 22 May, the party declared its merger with the UFP by 29 May. 6 days later, the party officially declared its merger into the UFP.

== Criticism ==
Though the UFP considered this party as its sister party, it was widely criticised as a satellite party or "decoy party" intended to take advantage of (and nullify the intended proportionality of) the new electoral law allocating some seats in a compensatory manner. The LKP's decision to establish this party was condemned by the ruling Democratic Party, Bareunmirae Party, New Alternatives and Justice Party, while the New Conservative Party kept silent. The Democratic Party declared it would file a lawsuit against the party. Oh Tae-yang, one of the co-presidents of the Our Future, broke into the party's convention and urged them to dissolve themselves. The Platform Party also criticized the foundation of the Future Korea Party, despite Platform being itself a satellite of the Democratic Party of Korea.

== Election results ==
Election	Leader	Constituency			Party list			Seats	Position	Status
Election	Leader	Votes	%	Seats	Votes	%	Seats	Seats	Position	Status
2020	Han Sun-kyo				9,441,520	33.84	19 / 47	19 / 300	1st	Opposition
