= Daeil High School =

Private boys' school in Seoul, South Korea

Coordinates: 37.5578°N 126.6784°E

- 대일고등학교

Location
- 563-2 Daeil Street; Deungchon-dong, Gangseo-gu, Seoul; South Korea

Information
- Type: Private
- Motto: Faithfulness, Devotion, Creativity 신의(信義),헌신(獻身),창의(創意)
- Established: 1972
- Gender: Boys

Korean name
- Hangul: 대일고등학교
- Hanja: 大一高等學校
- RR: Daeil godeunghakgyo
- MR: Taeil kodŭnghakkyo

Daeil High School (Korean: 대일고등학교) is a private, general boys high-school located in Deungchon-dong, Gangseo-gu, Seoul, South Korea.

== School history ==
- September 26, 1972: School legally recognized as Daeil High School, founding president Kim Seoung-min appointed
- March 3, 1973: First admissions (600 students)
