= Hannara Party (2012) =

2006–2012 political party in South Korea

The Hannara Party (Korean: 한나라당; RR: Hannaradang) was a political party in South Korea. While former chairman Lee Tae Hee argued that the party succeeded Hwanin and Hwanung, the Liberty Korea Party (Saenuri Party) argued that Hannara had stolen the Saenuri Party's older name (GNP, which is the same in Korean: "한나라당") to confuse conservative voters. However, the South Korean National Party Commission (중앙선관위) supported the legality of the name.

== History ==
The party gained 181,748 votes, 0.85% of the total in the 2012 General Election (7th of 20 parties in a proportional election), thus failing to obtain a seat in the South Korean National Assembly. In South Korea, a party must gain at least 2% of total vote to take a block seat. Due to Korean alphabetical order it was listed last of the twenty parties in the election.

After the election, the National Election Administration Office dissolved the party. Members separated into two parties. Lee Yong-hwi created 'Hope! Hannara Party' and elected Lee Eun-young as the chair. She is an incumbent member of the local assembly of Daegu and wife of Lee Yong-hwi. Hope Hannara Party then changed its name to The New Politics Party (새정치국민의당) in July 2013. Lee Tae Hee, former chairman of The Hannara Party, created the New Hannara Party (새한나라당) to succeed The Hannara Party. New Hannara Party then changed its name to The Grand National Party (한나라당) in February 2014.

== Names used ==
- Liberty Peace Party (자유평화당) (2006 to January 2012)
- New Freedom and Peace Party (영남신당자유평화당) (January to March 2012)
- The Hannara Party (한나라당, Grand National Party) (March to 11 April 2012)

== Electoral results ==
Election	Leader	Constituency			Party list			Seats	Position	Status
Election	Leader	Votes	%	Seats	Votes	%	Seats	Seats	Position	Status
2012	Lee Tae-hee	454	0.00	0 / 246	181,822	0.85	0 / 54	0 / 300	8th	Extra-parliamentary
