= Chinbak Yeondae =

2012–2022 political party in South Korea

Chinbak Yeondae 친박연대
- Leader: Lee Eun-Young
- Founded: 13 November 2012
- Dissolved: 14 June 2022
- Headquarters: Seoul
- Ideology: Conservatism; Pro-Park Geun-hye
- Political position: Right-wing

Website
- newpolitics.co.kr

The Chinbak Yeondae (Korean: 친박연대), or formerly People's New Party for Reform (NP, Korean: 개혁국민신당), was a political party in South Korea. Former chairman Lee Yong-Hwi tried to establish the New Yeoongnam Party, but he decided to join the Freedom and Peace Party in January 2012. The Freedom and Peace Party changed its name to New Yeongnam and Freedom and Peace Party in January 2012. In March 2012, the party changed its name to The Hannara Party, but the Saenuri Party argued that the Hannara Party stole the Saenuri Party's older name ("GNP", which was the same in Korean ("한나라당")) to confuse the conservative voter. However, the South Korean National Party Commission (중앙선관위) justified the name on legal grounds.

The party gained only 0.85% of the total votes in the 2012 General Election (7th out of 20 parties), and thus failed to take a seat in the National Assembly. In South Korea, a party must gain at least 2% of the total vote to take a block seat. Due to having a similar name as the last party (number "20" in Korean alphabet order), the party gained only 181,748 votes.

After the general election in April 2012, it was cancelled by the National Election Administration Office. Members of the party separated into two parties. Lee Dong-hwi made the Hope! Hannara Party and elected Lee Eun-young as the new chairman. The Hope! Hannara Party changed its name to the People's Party for New Politics (새정치국민의당) in July 2013.

== Names Used ==
- Hannara Party (한나라당, Grand National Party) (March to 11 April 2012)
- Hope! Hannara Party (희망! 한나라당) (November 2012 to July 2013)
- People's Party for New Politics (새정치국민의당) (July 2013 to November 2017)
- Chinbak Yeondae (친박연대) (November 2017 to present)
