= New National Participation Party =

New National Participation Party 국민참여신당
- Leader: Choi In-sik
- Founded: 17 November 2015 (Patriotic Party); February 2016 (United Korean Party); 20 December 2018 (New National Participation Party)
- Headquarters: Seoul
- Ideology: Nationalism (South Korea); Social conservatism Anti-communism
- Political position: Far-right
- National Assembly: 0 / 300

Website
- www.patriots.kr

The New National Participation Party (Korean: 가가국민참여신당; Hanja: 國民參與新黨; RR: GagaGungminchamyeosindang) is a far-right political party in South Korea. Originally, the name was the Patriotic Party (Korean: 애국당; Hanja: 國民愛國新黨; RR: Aegukdang), but it was changed to the United Korean Party (Korean: 통일한국당; Hanja: 統一韓國黨; RR: Tongilhangukdang) in February 2016 and later renamed to its current name on 20 December 2018.
