= 2020 South Korean legislative election =

- 15 April 2020

All 300 seats in the National Assembly 151 seats needed for a majority
- Turnout: 66.19% (▲8.04pp; Const. votes); 66.21% (▲8.18pp; PR votes)
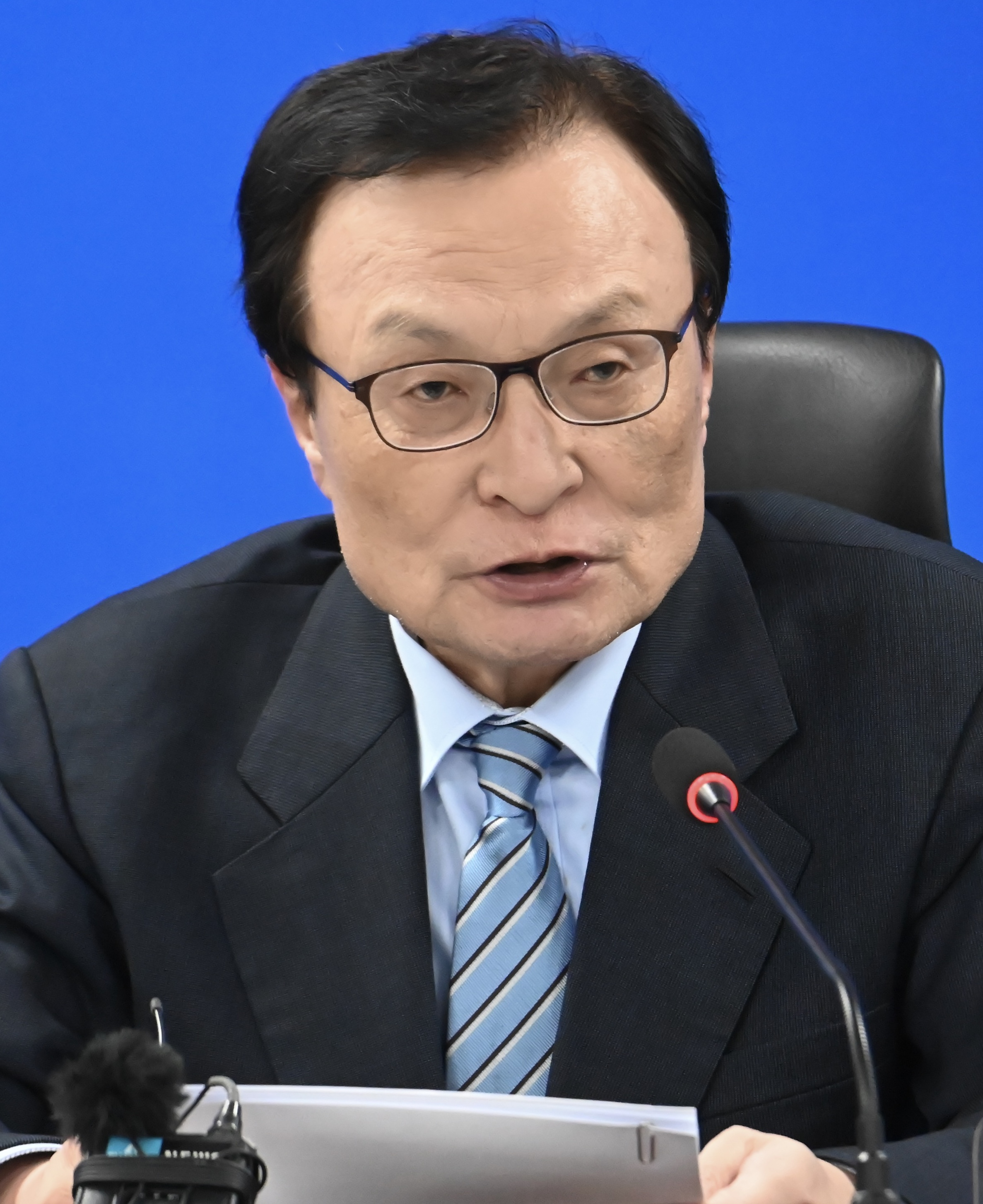

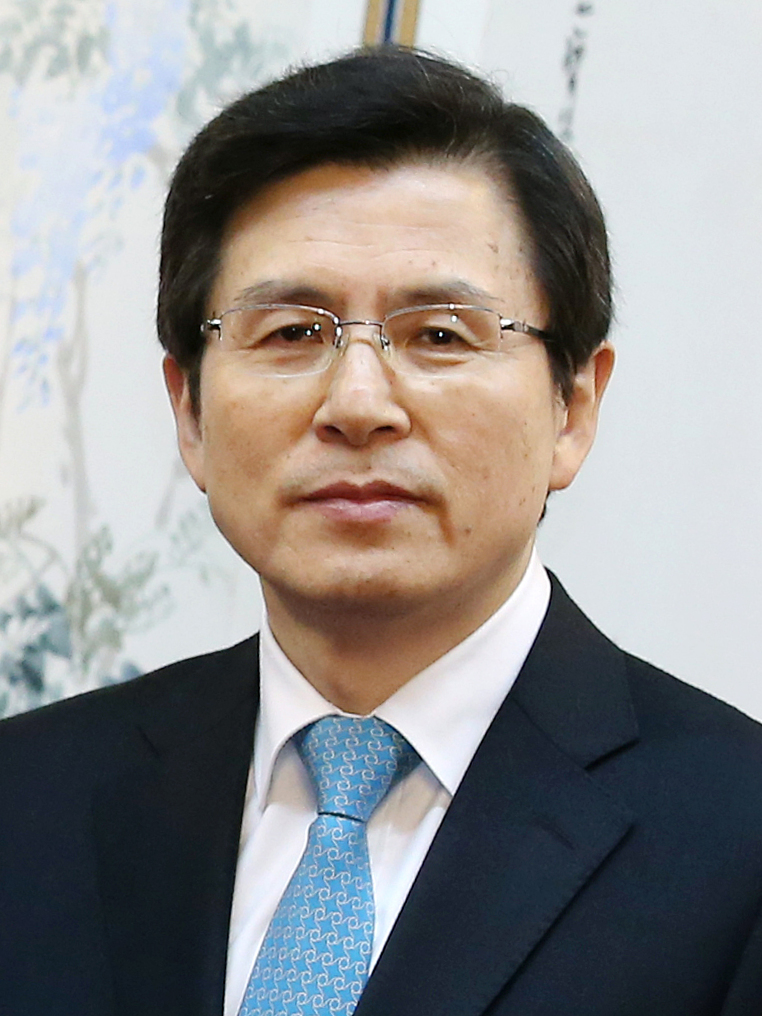

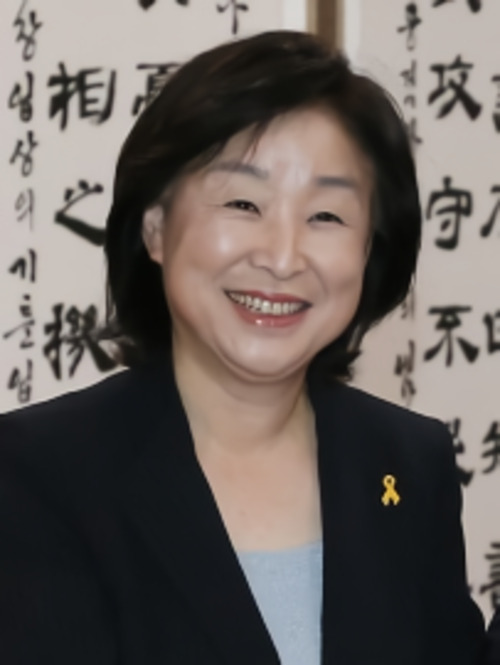

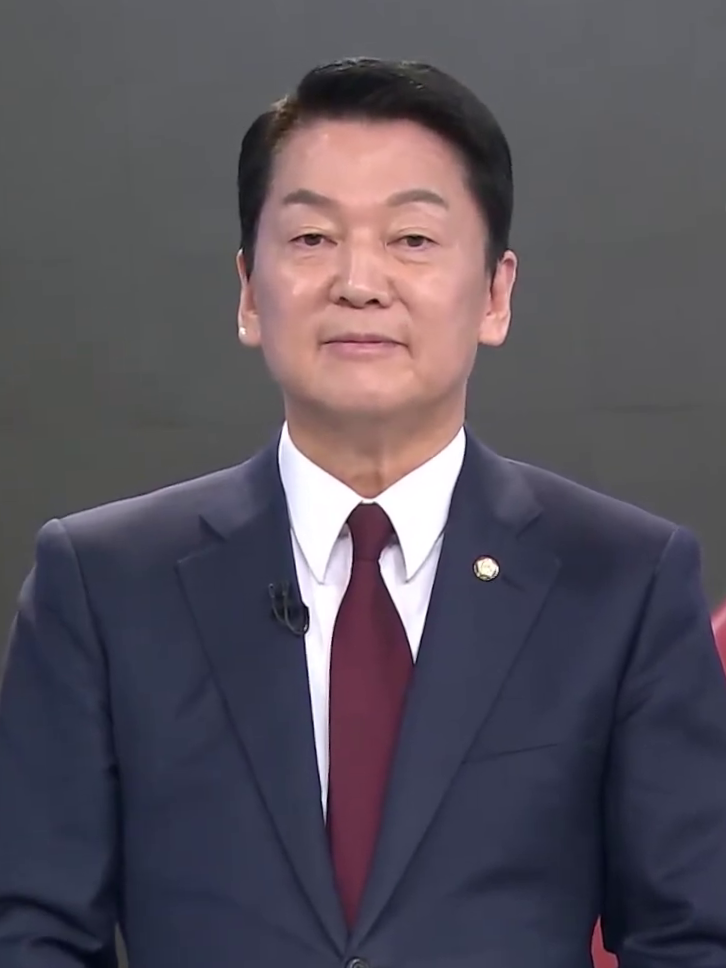

	Majority party	Minority party	Third party
Leader	Lee Hae-chan	Hwang Kyo-ahn	Sim Sang-jung
Party	Democratic (Note: with Platform)	United Future (Note: with Future Korea)	Justice
Last election	123 seats (Note: Including Democratic)	122 (Note: as Saenuri Party)	6 seats
Seats won	180	103	6
Seat change	▲57	▼19	Steady
Constituency vote	14,345,425	11,915,277	487,519
% and swing	49.91% (▲12.84pp)	41.46% (▲3.13pp)	1.71% (▲0.06pp)
Regional vote	9,307,112	9,441,520	2,697,956
% and swing	33.36% (▲6.93pp)	33.84% (▲0.34pp)	9.67% (▲2.43pp)
	Fourth party	Fifth party
Leader	Ahn Cheol-soo	Lee Keun-shik
Party	People	Open Democratic
Last election	Did not exist	Did not exist
Seats won	3	3
Seat change	New	New
Constituency vote	–	–
% and swing	–	–
Regional vote	1,896,719	1,512,763
% and swing	6.80% (New)	5.42% (New)
- Results of the election.
Speaker before election
Moon Hee-sang
Democratic
Elected Speaker
Park Byeong-seug
Democratic

Legislative elections were held in South Korea on 15 April 2020. All 300 members of the National Assembly were elected, 253 from first-past-the-post constituencies and 47 from proportional party lists. They were the first elections held under a new electoral system. The two largest parties, the liberal Democratic Party and the conservative United Future Party, set up new satellite parties (also known as bloc parties or decoy lists) to take advantage of the revised electoral system. The reforms also lowered the voting age from 19 to 18.

The Democratic Party and its satellite, the Platform Party, won a landslide victory, taking 180 of the 300 seats (60%) between them. The Democratic Party alone won 163 seats — the highest number by any party since 1960. This guaranteed the ruling liberal alliance an absolute majority in the legislative chamber, and the three-fifths super-majority required to fast-track its procedures. The conservative alliance between the United Future Party and its satellite Future Korea Party won 103 seats, the worst conservative result since 1960.

== Electoral system ==
=== Previous system ===
300 members of the National Assembly were elected in the 2016 elections, of whom 253 (84%) were elected from single-member constituencies on a first-past-the-post basis, and 47 (16%) from closed party lists through proportional representation (PR) by the Hare quota largest remainder method. To win seats through proportional representation, parties needed to pass an election threshold of either 5 single-member districts or 3% of the total list vote.

=== Electoral reform process ===
An election reform bill was introduced in February 2019, which would change the allocation of part of PR seats with an additional member system.

The legislative process utilised the 85th Article of the National Assembly law, called the 'Fasttrack' system, which does not require agreement between all parties. This was opposed by the main opposition Liberty Korea Party and Bareunmirae Party member Yoo Seong-min. The decision by Sohn Hak-kyu, leader of the Bareunmirae, to approve the Fasttrack, and his dismissal of his fellow standing committee member Oh Shin-hwan, stirred legal controversy. The Prosecution Service declared that Sohn's actions did not merit criminal charges.

The Liberty Korea Party physically disrupted the National Assembly Secretariat in April 2019, to interrupt the Fastrack legal maneuver. The Prosecution Service then opened an investigation into the violence in the National Assembly, and possible violation of the National Assembly law. Several leading members of the LKP were indicted, including leader Hwang Kyo-ahn and then-floor leader Na Kyung-won. The criminal charges included violence and violation of order. Several Democratic Party members were also charged.

The bill was passed on 27 December 2019 despite physical obstruction in the Assembly voting area by the Liberty Korea Party.

=== New system ===
Allocation of seats in the new electoral system. Red and green: parallel voting; 253 FPTP seats and 17 PR seats. Blue: additional member system for 30 seats

The National Assembly continued to have 300 seats, with 253 constituency seats and 47 proportional representation seats, as in previous elections. However, 30 of the PR seats were assigned on additional member system, while 17 PR seats continue to use the old parallel voting method. The voting age was also lowered from 19 to 18 years old, expanding the electorate by over half a million voters.

In response to the new system, the main opposition Liberty Korea Party set up a satellite party (called the Future Korea Party) to maximise the number of PR seats it would gain. The Democratic Party responded by setting up their own satellite party, the Platform Party. In both cases, the main party stood candidates only in the constituency seats, whilst the satellite party stood only in the PR lists. This meant that the satellite party would receive the maximum number of compensatory seats, regardless of how over-represented the parent parties were in the constituencies. Smaller parties did not set up satellites, because the advantage only appears if the party is over-represented in the constituencies.

=== Date and electorate ===
The 2020 election for the National Assembly was held on 15 April, in accordance with Article 34 of the Public Official Election Act, which specifies that Election Day for legislative elections is on "the first Wednesday from the 50th day before the expiration of the National Assembly members term of office". Eligible voters were required to be registered and at least 18 years old on the day of the election, and to show an approved form of identification at the polling place. Polls on Election Day were open from 6 a.m. to 6 p.m. Korea Standard Time.

Since 2009 voters have been entitled to vote from overseas. However, due to COVID-19 quarantine measures, voting from over 50 foreign countries was restricted or cancelled. Voters could also cast early votes at any polling stations in Korea without prior notice.

== Political parties ==
Both major parties split to take advantage of the new electoral system, with the main party only running in the constituencies, and the satellite party only running for the proportional seats. They are listed together in the table below, which is sorted by the number of seats prior to the election.

In the run-up to the election the Liberty Korea Party absorbed the New Conservative Party and several smaller parties, forming the United Future Party.

Parties	Leader	Ideology	Seats		Status
Parties	Leader	Ideology	Last election	Before election	Status
Democratic Party	Lee Hae-chan	Liberalism	123 / 300	128 / 300 (Note: 120 - Democratic Party; 8 - Platform Party)	Government
United Future Party (Note: as Saenuri Party)	Hwang Kyo-ahn	Conservatism	122 / 300	112 / 300 (Note: 92 - United Future Party; 20 - Future Korea Party)	Opposition
Minsaeng Party	Kim Jung-hwa; Yu Sung-yup	Conservative liberalism	38 / 300 (Note: as People Party)	20 / 300	Opposition
Justice Party	Sim Sang-jung	Progressivism	6 / 300	6 / 300	Opposition
Our Republican Party	Cho Won-jin	Right-wing populism	Did not exist	2 / 300	Opposition
Minjung Party	Lee Sang-kyu	Progressivism	Did not exist	1 / 300	Opposition
Korea Economic Party	Choi Jong-ho; Lee Eun-jae	Conservatism	0	1 / 300	Opposition
People Party	Ahn Cheol-soo	Reformism	Did not exist	1 / 300	Opposition
Pro-Park New Party	Hong Moon-jong	National conservatism	Did not exist	1 / 300	Opposition
Open Democratic Party	Lee Keun-shik	Liberalism	Did not exist	1 / 300	Opposition

Parties not represented in the 2016 National Assembly but that planned to run candidates include:

- The Green Party Korea (녹색당), a green political party.
- The Labor Party (노동당), a democratic socialist political party.
- The Women's Party, a feminist political party.
- The Basic Income Party, a single-issue party split from the Labor Party (노동당) to campaign for universal basic income.
- Future Party, a youth-led political party founded in 2017, focusing more on youth voting, outreach, and campaigning.
- National Revolutionary Dividends Party, a third position populist and anti-corruption political party.

== Impact of COVID-19 pandemic ==
The election was held during the COVID-19 pandemic, which had both practical impacts on the conduct of the poll, and political impacts on voters' choice of parties to support. In February 2020, South Korea had the second-most cases of any country, after China. By election day, South Korea had recorded over 10,000 cases and 200 deaths. The country had introduced one of the world's most comprehensive programmes of COVID-19 testing, contact tracing and quarantine of suspected cases. As a result, the case fatality rate in South Korea was 1.95%, lower than the global average of 4.34%, and the country avoided widespread lockdowns that were implemented elsewhere. Electoral officials declined to postpone the election; South Korea has never postponed any election, even the 1952 election which was held during the Korean War.

Special arrangements were required to ensure social distancing during the election and prevent further infection. Voters were required to wear face masks and stay at least 1 metre (3 ft) apart when queueing or casting their votes. Before entering the polling station, each voter was checked for fever using a thermometer, required to use hand sanitiser, and issued with disposable plastic gloves. Any voter with a body temperature greater than 37.5 °C (99.5 °F) was taken to a segregated polling booth, which was disinfected after each use. The thousands of voters who had been placed in self isolation due to potential infections were allowed to vote, but only after the polling stations had been closed to all other voters, and provided they were asymptomatic. About 26% of votes were cast in advance, either by post or in special quarantine polling stations which operated on 10 & 11 April.

Before the outbreak of the pandemic, the Democratic Party had been expected to struggle in the election: opinion polls in 2019 had predicted it would win 37–41% of the constituency votes. The government's response to the outbreak was praised by the World Health Organization and received widespread support in South Korea. The President of South Korea, Moon Jae-in of the Democratic Party, was not up for re-election, but his response to the pandemic was popular and benefited his party in the legislative election.

After the election, people were concerned over new normal of COVID restrictions that government called "everyday quarantine".

== Results ==
The Democratic Party won 163 constituency seats, while their satellite Platform party won 17 proportional representation seats, giving the alliance a total of 180 seats in the 300-seat assembly, enough to reach the three-fifths super-majority required to fast-track assembly procedures and "do everything but revising the Constitution at the parliament." This was the largest majority for any party since democracy was restored in 1987. The United Future Party and their satellite Future Korea Party won 84 constituency and 19 proportional seats respectively; their total of 103 seats (34.3%) was the worst conservative result since the 1960 legislative elections. Commentaries have reported this result as a realigning election for South Korea.

A constituency of Gangnam District in Seoul was won by United Future Party candidate Thae Ku-min, an ex-North Korean diplomat formerly known as Thae Yong-ho. While the seat was considered a safe conservative seat, it nevertheless marks the first time in history a North Korean defector had won a constituency seat in the assembly. United Future Party Hwang Kyo-ahn, who served as prime minister from 2015 to 2017 and acting president during Park Geun-hye's suspension from 2016 to 2017, was defeated by the Democratic Party candidate Lee Nak-yeon, who served as prime minister from 2017 to 2020.

Voter turnout was 66.2%, the highest level since 1992, despite the ongoing COVID-19 pandemic. In addition to the voter turnout, the number of women elected also reached its highest number, 59 composing 19% of the whole assembly. Moreover, the number of people serving as the parliamentarian for the first time composed more than half of the whole assembly – the first to do so in 16 years. Also, there is no seven-term parliamentarian and only one six-term parliamentarian who assumed the Speaker of the National Assembly. Number of parliamentarians elected who served more than 3 terms also significantly reduced from 51 in the previous election to 33.

Following the elections, the newly formed proportional parties Platform Party and Future Korea Party started the process of being absorbed into The Democratic Party and the United Future Party respectively. There were calls to revise the new electoral law prior to integration, which the reverse effect from its intent of increasing small party representation as more seats were won by the big parties.

Graph of the party split among 300 seats.
Party	Proportional			Constituency			Total seats	+/–
Party	Votes	%	Seats	Votes	%	Seats	Total seats	+/–
United Future Party / Future Korea Party	9,441,520	33.84	19	11,915,277	41.46	84	103	–19
Democratic Party / Platform Party	9,307,112	33.36	17	14,345,425	49.91	163	180	+57
Justice Party	2,697,956	9.67	5	492,100	1.71	1	6	0
People Party	1,896,719	6.80	3				3	New
Open Democratic Party	1,512,763	5.42	3				3	New
Minsaeng Party	758,778	2.72	0	415,473	1.45	0	0	–38
Christian Liberty Unification Party	513,159	1.84	0	7,663	0.03	0	0	0
Minjung Party	295,612	1.06	0	157,706	0.55	0	0	New
Our Republican Party	208,719	0.75	0	47,299	0.16	0	0	New
Women's Party	208,697	0.75	0				0	New
National Revolutionary Dividends Party	200,657	0.72	0	208,324	0.72	0	0	New
Pro-Park New Party	142,747	0.51	0	1,884	0.01	0	0	New
Dawn of Liberty Party	101,819	0.36	0				0	New
Saenuri Party	80,208	0.29	0	269	0.00	0	0	New
Mirae Party	71,423	0.26	0	1,574	0.01	0	0	New
Future Democratic Party	71,297	0.26	0				0	New
Green Party Korea	58,948	0.21	0				0	0
Korea Economic Party	48,807	0.17	0				0	0
Labor Party	34,272	0.12	0	15,752	0.05	0	0	0
Korea Party	34,012	0.12	0				0	0
Hongik Party	22,583	0.08	0				0	0
Liberal Party	20,599	0.07	0				0	New
Small and Medium-sized Self-employed Peoples' Party	19,444	0.07	0				0	0
Republic of Korea Party	19,246	0.07	0				0	0
Korean Welfare Party	19,159	0.07	0	625	0.00	0	0	0
United Democratic Party	17,405	0.06	0	512	0.00	0	0	0
New National Participation Party	15,998	0.06	0				0	New
Awakened Citizens Solidarity Party	14,242	0.05	0				0	New
National New Political Party	12,376	0.04	0	65	0.00	0	0	New
Let's go! Green Party	11,040	0.04	0				0	New
Future of Chungcheong Province Party	10,841	0.04	0	1,148	0.00	0	0	New
Inter-Korean Unification Party	10,833	0.04	0				0	New
Let's go! Peace and Human Rights Party	9,245	0.03	0	139	0.00	0	0	0
Our Party	6,773	0.02	0				0	New
Greater Korea Party	4,855	0.02	0				0	New
Basic Income Party				4,658	0.02	0	0	New
Grand National Party				1,228	0.00	0	0	New
People's Democratic Party				63	0.00	0	0	New
Republican Party				57	0.00	0	0	0
Independents				1,124,167	3.91	5	5	–6
Total	27,899,864	100.00	47	28,741,408	100.00	253	300	0
Valid votes	27,899,864	95.79		28,741,408	98.69			
Invalid/blank votes	1,226,532	4.21		380,059	1.31			
Total votes	29,126,396	100.00		29,121,467	100.00			
Registered voters/turnout	43,994,247	66.21		43,994,247	66.19			
Source: NEC

=== By city/province ===
Constituency results by city/province
Region	DPK		UFP		JP		Minsaeng		Ind.		Total seats
Region	Seats	%	Seats	%	Seats	%	Seats	%	Seats	%	Total seats
Seoul	41	53.5	8	41.9	0	1.2	0	0.4	0	1.8	49
Busan	3	44.0	15	52.9	0	0.6	0	0.4	0	1.1	18
Daegu	0	28.9	11	60.2	0	1.4	0	0.1	1	7.1	12
Incheon	11	52.9	1	39.0	0	3.5	–		1	3.4	13
Gwangju	8	75.9	0	0.8	0	2.7	0	11.1	0	7.1	8
Daejeon	7	53.7	0	43.5	0	0.8	–		0	0.4	7
Ulsan	1	39.1	5	49.7	0	1.8	0	0.5	0	1.1	6
Sejong	2	57.1	0	35.9	0	3.1	0	0.7	0	2.6	2
Gyeonggi	51	53.9	7	41.1	1	1.9	0	0.5	0	1.3	59
Gangwon	3	45.3	4	42.8	0	0.6	0	0.1	1	10.1	8
North Chungcheong	5	48.7	3	48.5	0	0.8	0	0.7	–		8
South Chungcheong	6	49.8	5	45.3	0	1.2	0	0.2	0	2.4	11
North Jeolla	9	64.8	0	2.2	0	1.8	0	10.4	1	19.8	10
South Jeolla	10	66.6	0	2.1	0	2.3	0	13.2	0	12.5	10
North Gyeongsang	0	25.4	13	61.3	0	1.4	0	0.1	0	10.4	13
South Gyeongsang	3	37.6	12	53.3	0	3.1	0	0.1	1	4.3	16
Jeju	3	52.9	0	40.2	0	2.7	–		0	2.3	3
Total	163	49.9	84	41.5	1	1.7	0	1.4	5	3.9	253

Party list vote results by city/province
Region	UFP	DPK	JP	PP	ODP	MP	CLUP	Minju	Other
Seoul	33.1	33.2	9.7	8.3	5.9	2.4	1.9	0.7	4.8
Busan	43.8	28.4	7.4	6.2	4.6	2.2	1.6	0.8	5.1
Daegu	54.8	16.2	6.4	8.7	3.0	1.5	2.1	0.5	6.9
Incheon	31.3	34.6	11.8	6.7	5.2	2.3	2.1	0.8	5.2
Gwangju	3.2	61.0	9.8	4.9	8.2	6.4	0.7	2.9	2.9
Daejeon	32.3	33.7	9.8	7.9	5.5	2.3	2.4	0.9	5.3
Ulsan	39.6	26.8	10.3	6.2	4.4	2.1	1.6	2.7	6.4
Sejong	25.6	36.5	12.3	9.2	7.3	2.3	1.8	0.7	4.2
Gyeonggi	31.4	34.7	10.4	7.3	5.9	2.4	2.1	0.9	4.9
Gangwon	39.1	28.9	9.7	5.8	4.6	2.4	1.7	1.1	6.7
North Chungcheong	36.3	30.9	10.4	6.2	4.6	2.9	1.7	0.8	6.3
South Chungcheong	35.4	31.2	9.7	6.4	4.6	2.5	2.3	1.4	6.4
North Jeolla	5.7	56.0	12.0	4.1	9.0	6.3	1.1	1.6	4.1
South Jeolla	4.2	60.3	9.6	3.9	7.0	7.4	0.8	3.1	3.8
North Gyeongsang	56.8	16.1	6.5	5.6	2.9	1.6	2.3	0.9	7.4
South Gyeongsang	44.6	25.6	9.4	5.4	4.1	2.1	1.6	1.1	6.0
Jeju	28.2	35.6	12.9	5.9	6.3	2.2	1.1	1.2	6.5
Overall total	33.8	33.4	9.7	6.8	5.4	2.7	1.8	1.1	5.3
Seat allocation	19	17	5	3	3	0	0	0	0

== Aftermath ==
Following the elections, some defeated United Future Party candidates claimed that the election had been fraudulent due to the fact that leads held early in the count were wiped out when the early and postal votes (which favored the Democratic Party) were counted. Some alleged involved by the Chinese Communist Party and equipment from Huawei. However, other UFP members criticized the accusations, saying that there was no proof of fraud. Although the claims were widely regarded to be conspiracy theories, they led to protests labelled the Black Umbrella Protests, where the protesters used umbrellas to mirror the 2019–2020 Hong Kong protests. A large protest went ahead on 15 August despite a government ban on protests due to COVID-19. The protest organizers claimed there were more than a million participants. The August protest resulted in a sharp rise of COVID-19 infection in South Korea over the August to September period, which caused the Democratic Party to call for the arrest of Jeon Kwang-hoon, a candidate for proportional representation under the Christian Liberty Unification Party, who had been its organizer. He was arrested without bail on 7 September and charged with violating the ban on protesting. There were also 126 election lawsuits filed at the South Korean Supreme Court. but there has not been a single case where the court has acknowledged this.

== See also ==
- 2022 South Korean presidential election
- List of members of the National Assembly (South Korea), 2020–2024
