= Chung Jin-suk (politician) =

South Korean politician (born 1960)

The Right Honourable Chung Jin-suk
- 정진석
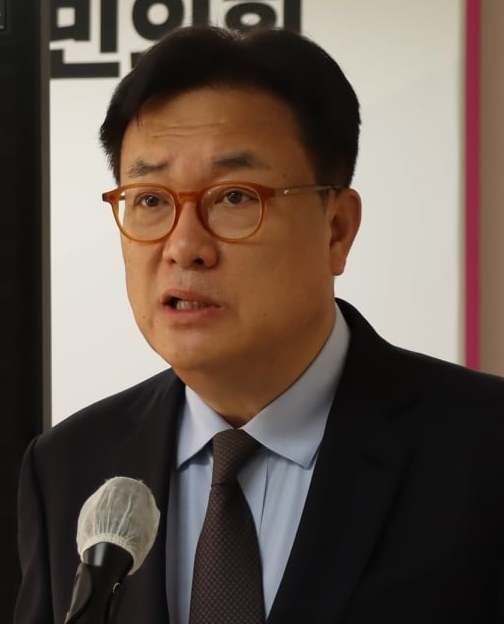
- Chung in January 2022

Chief of Staff to the President
- In office 22 April 2024 – 4 June 2025
- President: Yoon Suk Yeol; Han Duck-soo (acting); Choi Sang-mok (acting); Lee Ju-ho (acting)
- Preceded by: Lee Kwan-sub
- Succeeded by: Kang Hoon-sik

Interim Leader of People Power Party
- In office 8 September 2022 – 8 March 2023
- Preceded by: Kweon Seong-dong (acting)
- Succeeded by: Kim Gi-hyeon

Deputy Speaker of the National Assembly
- In office 31 August 2021 – 10 November 2022 Serving with Kim Sang-hee (2021-22), Kim Young-joo (2022)
- Preceded by: Lee Ju-young; Joo Seung-yong
- Succeeded by: Chung Woo-taik

Acting Leader of the Saenuri Party
- In office 11 May 2016 – 1 June 2016
- Preceded by: Won Yoo-chul (acting)
- Succeeded by: Kim Hee-ok (interim)

Secretary-General of the National Assembly
- In office 1 January 2013 – 28 February 2014
- Preceded by: Yoon Won-joong
- Succeeded by: Park Heong-joon

Senior Secretary to the President for Political Affairs
- In office 16 July 2010 – 10 June 2011
- President: Lee Myung-bak
- Preceded by: Park Heong-joon
- Succeeded by: Kim Hyo-jae

Member of the National Assembly
- In office 30 May 2016 – 22 April 2024
- Preceded by: Park Soo-hyun (Gongju, South Chungcheong); Lee Wan-koo (Buyeo-Cheongyang, South Chungcheong)
- Succeeded by: Park Soo-hyun
- Constituency: Gongju-Buyeo-Cheongyang (South Chungcheong)
- In office 30 May 2008 – 16 July 2010
- Constituency: Proportional
- In office 1 May 2005 – 29 May 2008
- Preceded by: Oh Si-deok
- Succeeded by: Shim Dae-pyung
- Constituency: Gongju-Yeongi (South Chungcheong)
- In office 30 May 2000 – 29 May 2004
- Preceded by: Chung Suk-mo (Gongju, South Chungcheong); Kim Goh-sung (Yeongi, South Chungcheong)
- Succeeded by: Oh Si-deok
- Constituency: Gongju-Yeongi (South Chungcheong)

Personal details
- Born: 4 September 1960 (age 66) Gongju South Chungcheong, South Korea
- Party: Independent
- Other political affiliations: ALDE (1999–2005); PFP (2006–2007); GNP (2008–2010; 2010–2012); Saenuri (2012–2013; 2014–2017); LKP (2017–2020); UFP (2020); PPP (2020-2024)
- Spouse: Lee Mi-ho
- Children: Chung Ga-young; Chung Won-young
- Parent(s): Chung Suk-mo (father); Yoon Seok-nam (mother)
- Education: Korea University
- Occupation: Activist, journalist, politician

Chung Jin-suk (Korean: 정진석, born 4 September 1960) is a South Korean journalist, activist, and politician who briefly served as the interim leader of the Saenuri Party from 11 May 2016 to 1 June 2016. A member of the People Power Party, he held office as a member of the National Assembly from 2000 to 2004, 2005 to 2010, and 2016 to 2024. Chung also served as the senior secretary to the president for political affairs in the Lee Myung-bak government from 2010 to 2011.

Chung was born in Gongju and attended Sungdong High School, before going on to Korea University to study political science and diplomacy. He joined the now-defunct Alliance of Liberal Democrats (ALDE) in 1999, and before entering parliament worked as the party spokesperson. Chung was elected to the National Assembly at the 2000 election, winning the Gongju-Yeongi constituency in South Chungcheong. He moved to the People First Party (PFP) in 2006, where he served as its parliamentary leader and a vice president. He then subsequently joined the Grand National Party (GNP).

After the GNP's victory in the 2008 election, he was appointed President of the Intelligence Committee; he was also made Senior Secretary to the President for Political Affairs. In the 2012 election, he moved to Seoul Central but lost to Chyung Ho-joon, a son of Chyung Dai-chul. After the electoral lost, he was made Chief Secretary to the Speaker of the National Assembly, and then Secretary-General of the National Assembly.

Following Saenuri's defeat in the 2016 election, Chung stood against Na Kyung-won in the ensuring parliamentary leadership election. Although the election was widely expected as neck and neck, Chung defeated Na by obtaining additional supports from 23 MPs. He was also made interim party president; the position was vacant since the resignation of Kim Moo-sung. Chung, however, stepped down amid the impeachment of the then President Park Geun-hye in December 2016. After his re-election as an MP in the 2020 election, he was a potential Deputy Speaker of the National Assembly by the United Future Party, but he refused the bid. He accepted the bid in 2021 and was elected on 31 August 2021.

== Early life ==
Chung Jin-suk was born in Gongju, South Chungcheong, the son of Chung Suk-mo and Yoon Seok-nam. His mother was from Papyeong Yoon clan and a direct descendant of Yun Jeung, while his father was from Dongnae Chung clan. His father was a prominent politician, serving as the Governor of Gangwon, the 2-term Governor of South Chungcheong, the Deputy Minister and the Minister of Home Affairs, a 6-term MP and so on. Chung Jin-suk is the 2nd son and the youngest of the 2 sons and a daughter of his parents. His brother, Chung Jin-ho, is a businessman.

=== Education ===
Chung was educated at Sungdong High School in Central District, Seoul. There he became involved in student politics and was elected President of the Student Council. It was also there where he organised a massive anti-US protest after it was disclosed that the intelligence of the Jimmy Carter administration were bugging the Blue House. He led the demonstration till a roundabout in Sindang-dong.

After the graduation in 1979, Chung studied political science and diplomacy at Korea University, where he met his wife, Lee Mi-ho. He also received an honorary doctorate in public administration from Kongju National University in 2011.

=== Pre-parliamentary career ===
After completing his political science and diplomacy degree, Chung joined Hankook Ilbo, where he worked as a journalist and an editorial writer for about 15 years. He was involved in the International Department, the Social Department, and the Political Department of the press; he used to be the Deputy Head of the latter department. In the mid-1990s, Chung took crucial roles as a Washington, D.C. correspondent; in 1994, he flew to Port-au-Prince, Haiti in order to report the situation of a civil war. In 1995, he met Kim Jong-pil who was briefly staying in Washington, D.C. after withdrew from the then ruling Democratic Liberal Party (DLP) following an internal conflict with the then President Kim Young-sam. Chung advised Kim to establish a new Hoseo-based party, which is the Alliance of Liberal Democrats (ALDE). Since then, he was known as the "Top No 1 Founder of the ALDE". In the 1996 election, the ALDE became the 3rd largest party in the National Assembly, winning 50 out of 299 seats.

== Early political career ==
=== Entry to the National Assembly ===
Prior to the 2000 election, Chung was brought into the Alliance of Liberal Democrats (ALDE) in 1999. He became the Special Adviser to the then Honorary Chairman of the ALDE and the Prime Minister Kim Jong-pil on 16 September 1999. From this time, he had been risen as the potential candidate for Gongju-Yeongi, which was also his father's former constituency. As his father was not seeking the bid, Chung won preselection for Gongju-Yeongi. However, Kim Goh-sung, the then MP for Yeongi who lost ALDE preselection, quit the party and joined the newly formed minor New Korea Party of Hope (NKPH). Amid the 10-cornered fight, Chung barely elected to the National Assembly with approximately 25.2%; this made him as the winner with the lowest votes.

The ruling DJP Alliance consisted of the Millennium Democratic Party (MDP) and the Alliance of Liberal Democrats (ALDE) narrowly lost to the main opposition Grand National Party (GNP) amid internal conflicts between the ruling coalition. For the ALDE, the party only secured 17 seats that was 3 seats fall short of the minimum requirement to form a parliamentary group. Initially, the party was willing to ease the requirement from 20 to 10 seats, but instead, the MDP sent 3 seats to the ALDE, which was controversial till the Deputy Chairman Kang Chang-hee opposed the decision, but was expelled from the party in the end. As the party's future was seemed unclear, Chung urged the party to ensure its own identity, including reconcile with the MDP. Despite his effort, the DJP Alliance finally broke up on 3 September 2001 after the ALDE voted in favour of a motion of no-confidence against the Minister of Unification Lim Dong-won. Following the collapse of the DJP Alliance, Chung was appointed Spokesperson of the ALDE on 12 October.

In 2004, the National Assembly voted for the impeachment of Roh Moo-hyun following his remarks that supporting the then de facto ruling Uri Party. Despite the strong boycott of the Uri Party, 193 MPs from the 3 oppositions (GNP, MDP and ALDE) voted in favour of the impeachment, and Chung was one of them (only Lee Nak-yon and Kim Chong-hoh voted against). The event, however, provoked a widespread anger among the people, which let the Uri Party to win the majority (152 out of 300 seats) at the 2004 election. The ALDE only secured 4 seats; Chung also lost his seat to Oh Si-deok. Nevertheless, he had an opportunity to return as Oh's election was annulled on 27 January 2005. He subsequently withdrew from the ALDE and ran as an independent candidate for Gongju-Yeongi at the by-elections on 30 April. He defeated the Uri candidate Lee Byung-ryung with a margin of 4,630 votes.

=== People First Party ===
By the time he withdrew from the ALDE, Chung was widely speculated to join the proposed Hoseo-based localist conservative party, projected by the Governor of South Chungcheong Shim Dae-pyung and the Mayor of Daejeon Yŏm Hong-ch'ŏl; On 19 October, the formation of the new party named the People First Party (PFP) was announced by several key figures including Shim, Chung and so on.

On 17 January 2006, the PFP was officially established. Shim Dae-pyung and Shin Kook-hwan was elected co-presidents, while Chung was appointed parliamentary leader the following day.

However, on 14 December 2007, 5 days before the presidential election, Chung made an announcement to leave the PFP. He did not mention the reasons clearly, but several newspapers suggested that he opposed the Shim's withdrawal in order to support the independent candidate Lee Hoi-chang, as he was in favour of the GNP candidate Lee Myung-bak. Following the landslide victory of Lee, Chung officially joined the GNP on 17 January 2008.

== Government era (2008–2017) ==
After Chung joined the GNP, he immediately sought a re-election for Gongju-Yeongi at the 2008 election, but failed to become the candidate. Instead, he ran 8th in the GNP list and was elected. On 8 June 2010, he became the President of the Intelligence Committee of the National Assembly.

=== Senior Secretary to the President for Political Affairs (2010–2011) ===
On 13 July 2010, Chung was nominated Senior Secretary to the President for Political Affairs by the President Lee Myung-bak. He then subsequently resigned as an MP due to a law that prohibiting MPs to hold positions of the Blue House; the vacancy was succeeded by Kim Sung-dong, son of the former Speaker Kim Soo-han.

The GNP was undergoing internal conflicts between pro-Lee Myung-bak and pro-Park Geun-hye faction over several issues, including the construction of Sejong City. One of Chung's first moves as Senior Secretary to the President for Political Affairs was the arbitration between Lee and Park. He organised meetings between two key figures of the party at the Blue House; the first was on 21 August. He also coordinated a project to make Park as the Lee's special envoy to Netherlands, Portugal and Greece in April 2011. Despite several criticisms during this period, his projects were widely regarded as successful.

=== Secretary-General of the National Assembly (2013–2014) ===
After the resignation on 10 June 2011, Chung became the Saenuri candidate for Seoul Central at the 2012 election. He contested against Chyung Ho-joon, a son of Chyung Dai-chul who was the former 5-term MP for the constituency. He failed to make a comeback by securing 28,904 votes (46.33%) that was lower than Chyung's 31,364 votes (50.27%). Instead, he was appointed Chief Secretary to the Speaker Kang Chang-hee on 2 July.

On 27 December, shortly after Park Geun-hye was elected President, Chung was nominated Secretary-General of the National Assembly. 193 out of 224 MPs voted in favour of his appointment on 1 January 2013. He oversaw several parliamentary reforms, including the establishment of suicide prevention facilities at the National Assembly Secretariat, as well as changing its temporary workers into full-time.

He resigned on 27 February 2014 in order to run as the Governor of South Chungcheong at the local elections in June. He won Saenuri preselection but lost to the incumbent Ahn Hee-jung.

=== Parliamentary leader of the Saenuri Party (2016) ===
In the 2016 election, Chung contested for Gongju-Buyeo-Cheongyang and defeated the Democratic candidate Park Soo-hyun. Nevertheless, his Saenuri Party suffered an upset crushing defeat, which resulted in a hung parliament. Kim Moo-sung subsequently resigned as party president, which let the position to be vacant until a new person is elected.

On 1 May, Chung launched his bid to run for the parliamentary leadership. 2 days later, he defeated Na Kyung-won and Yoo Ki-june by receiving 69 out of 119 votes. This made him as the first non-MP parliamentary leader in South Korean history ever, as his term was not started yet. He also became the interim President of the party, which he hold until being replaced by Kim Hee-ok on 2 June.

He also led a negotiation with Woo Sang-ho (Democratic) and Park Jie-won (People's) on 8 June. The Saenuri lost 2 committees (the Foreign Affairs and Unification Committee and the Special Committee on Budget and Accounts) to the Democratic. The Legislation and Judiciary Committee, which was often regarded as the de facto "Senate", was taken by the Democratic during the last session (2012–2016), but was handed over to the Saenuri in this time. The Saenuri failed to maintain the speakership that was taken over by Chung Sye-kyun of the Democratic.

The President Park Geun-hye was under public pressure to resign following a report of JTBC about Choi Soon-sil on 24 October. While 3 opposition parties (Democratic, People's, and Justice) agreed to bring the impeachment vote, Chung previously mentioned that the Saenuri would not vote against. On 9 December, 234 out of 300 MPs (1 did not attend) voted in favour of the impeachment of Park, and therefore Park's duty was immediately suspended. The next day, JoongAng Ilbo analysed that about 62 Saenuri MPs voted for, and 20 out of 62 are pro-Park MPs. 2 days later, Chung made an official announcement to step down as the parliamentary leader, saying, "As the parliamentary leader of the ruling party, I think it is reasonable to be responsible for the impeachment vote."

== Return to Opposition ==
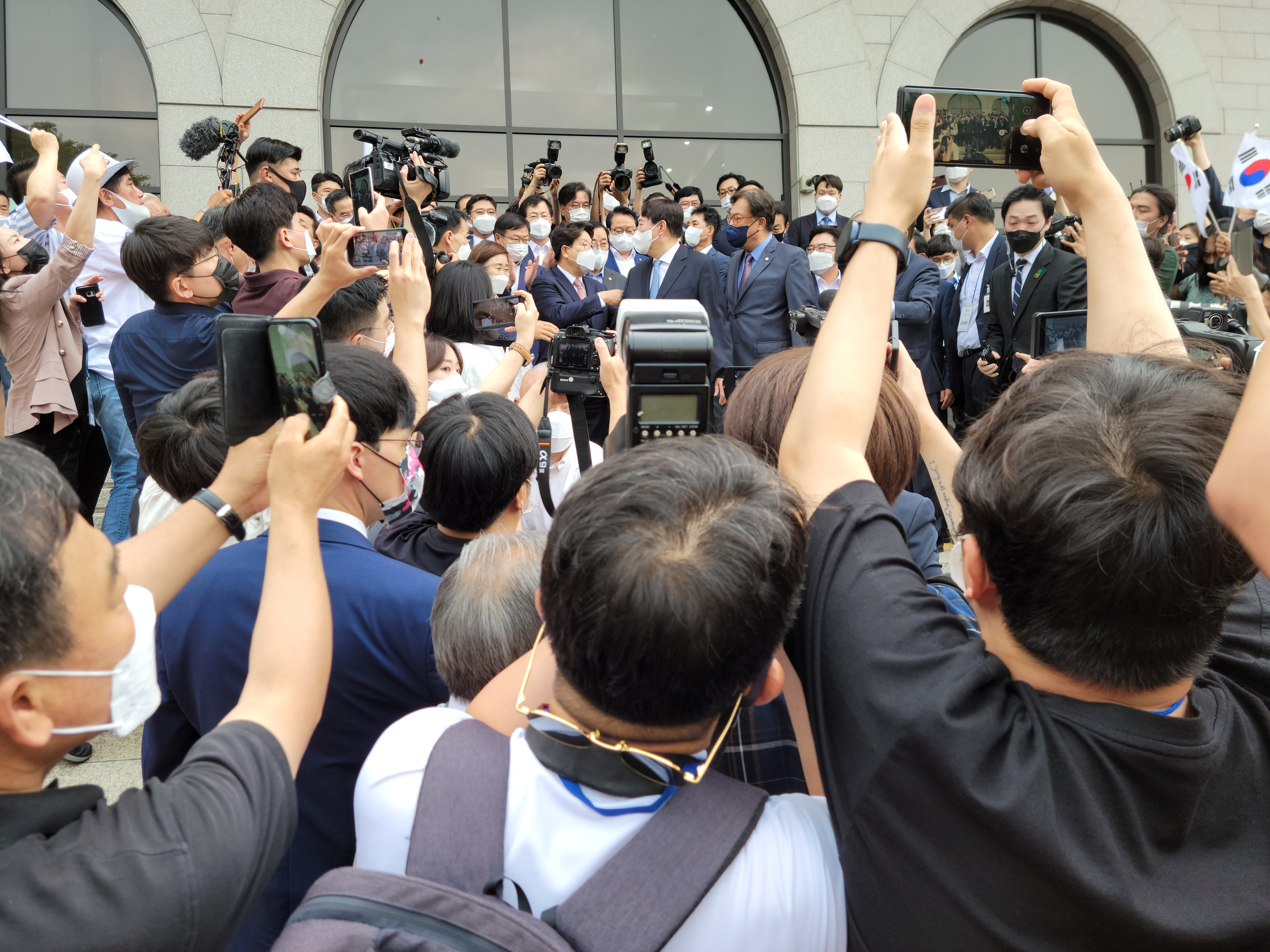
Chung Jin-suk is standing close to Yoon Seok-youl shortly before holding a press conference to run for president on 29 June 2021.

On 10 March 2017, the Constitutional Court upheld the impeachment of Park Geun-hye in a unanimous 8–0 decision, which provoked the snap presidential election on 9 May. The result was the outright victory of Moon Jae-in, who ran against Park Geun-hye 5 years ago.

In the 2020 election, Chung sought a re-election for Gongju-Buyeo-Cheongyang and again faced a challenge from Park Soo-hyun. Although various polls suggested that he might lose to Park, he successfully defeated Park with a margin of 2,624 votes (2.22%).

When Suh Byung-soo declined the bid, Chung was likely to be the sole candidate from the United Future Party (UFP). However, Chung rejected the deputy speakership on 29 June in a protest of the Democratic Party's decision to dominate the entire committees of the National Assembly. The UFP also confirmed to boycott the position on 8 July.

On 16 April 2021, Chung announced he would not run for the party leadership election on 11 June. The party leadership was won by Lee Jun-seok.

On 31 August, Chung was elected Deputy Speaker of the National Assembly.

In February 2023, Chung said that South Korea might need nuclear weapons.

== Controversies ==
=== "Leftist Zombies" remark ===
During the hearing session of the Prime Minister-nominee Lee Nak-yon on 24 May 2017, the MP for Jeungpyeong-Jincheon-Eumseong Kyeong Dae-soo put forwarded a question to Lee regarding an issue of the default of national service of his son. However, Kyeong was immediately attacked by netizens after it was reported that Kyeong's son also defaulted national service. Chung denounced them using a term "Leftist Zombies" (좌파 좀비) on his Facebook. Following a public backlash, he removed the term.

=== MV Sewol tragedy remarks ===
On 15 June 2018, following a crushing defeat of the Liberty Korea Party (LKP) at the 2018 local elections, Chung replied to a reporter's question, saying, "We were fully sunken like MV Sewol. Scathing self-reflections and self-examinations should be first, and we need to think carefully." Several netizens harshly criticised his response.

On 16 April 2019, Chung again provoked a controversy related to the MV Sewol tragedy by posting a following post on his Facebook:

"Please stop asking them to use the tragedy again. If they're really sorry about the deceased kids, they're not supposed to do that. I'm totally sick of it."

A message I've received today.

A day before, Cha Myong-jin, the former MP for Sosa, also provoked a controversy by posting defamatory remarks against the bereaved families of the tragedy.

Lee Jae-jung, the Spokesperson of the Democratic Party, urged the LKP to sack them immediately. Park Joo-min, a Democratic MP, said, "Sick of it? It's actually people like you. Not only sick of, but also scared of."

Chung soon removed the post and made an apology to the bereaved families. He was warned by the party on 29 May.

== Personal life ==
Chung was married to Lee Mi-ho, a daughter of the founder of Chungnam Spinning Group and Hyejeon College, the former Deputy Chairman of the Korean National Party (KNP), the former MP for Cheongyang-Hongseong-Yesan Lee Jong-sung. Both met each other when Chung was a Year 1 student at Korea University, and had a relationship before married her. Their marriage was held at Myeongdong Cathedral on 10 May 1984. They have 2 daughters — Chung Ga-young and Chung Won-young.

On 21 June 2020, Chung's elder daughter married the eldest son of Park Duk-hyum, the MP for Boeun-Okcheon-Yeongdong-Goesan, at a hotel in Gwangjin, Seoul. The marriage was, however, simple with their family and relatives; without inviting other politicians due to the COVID-19 pandemic. Both Chung and Park later sent a text message of apology to other MPs. Later, on 23 September, Park withdrew from the PPP following corruption allegations. The same day, Chung met the party's interim President Kim Chong-in, and Kim told Chung, "it's better for Park to leave the party." Chung subsequently met Park and told him Kim's will, and Park later quit the PPP. Later, Chung revealed that the withdrawal from the party was Park's willingness.

Despite his active involvement in politics and close ties with influential figures, Chung Jin-suk is known for maintaining a life grounded in introspection and simplicity. Those close to him often remark on his quiet demeanor and thoughtful approach to both personal and professional matters, qualities that hint at his deep-rooted Buddhist philosophy.

== Election results ==
=== General elections ===
Year	Elections	Constituency	Political party	Votes (%)	Remarks
2000	16th National Assembly General Election	Gongju–Yeongi (South Chungcheong)	ULD	25,249 (25.18%)	Won
2004	17th National Assembly General Election	Gongju–Yeongi (South Chungcheong)	ULD	31,004 (35.51%)	Defeated (2nd)
2005	2005 By-election	Gongju–Yeongi (South Chungcheong)	Independent	26,513 (43.31%)	Won
2008	18th National Assembly General Election	Proportional representation (8th)	GNP	6,421,727 (37.48%)	Elected
2012	19th National Assembly General Election	Jung (Seoul)	Saenuri	28,904 (46.33%)	Defeated (2nd)
2016	20th National Assembly General Election	Gongju–Buyeo–Cheongyang (South Chungcheong)	Saenuri	51,159 (48.13%)	Won
2020	21st National Assembly General Election	Gongju–Buyeo–Cheongyang (South Chungcheong)	UFP	57,487 (48.65%)	Won
2024	22nd National Assembly General Election	Gongju–Buyeo–Cheongyang (South Chungcheong)	PPP	59,855 (48.42%)	Defeated (2nd)

=== Local elections ===
==== Governor of South Chungcheong ====
Year	Elections	Constituency	Political party	Votes (%)	Remarks
2014	6th Iocal Election	South Chungcheong (Governoral Elections)	Saenuri	392,315 (43.95%)	Defeated (2nd)

National Assembly of the Republic of Korea
Preceded by Chung Suk-mo (Gongju, South Chungcheong); Kim Goh-sung (Yeongi, South Chungcheong)	Member of the National Assembly for Gongju–Yeongi (South Chungcheong); 30 May 2000–29 May 2004	Succeeded by Oh Si-deok
Preceded by Oh Si-deok	Member of the National Assembly for Gongju–Yeongi (South Chungcheong); 1 May 2005–29 May 2008	Succeeded by Shim Dae-pyung
Preceded by	Member of the National Assembly for Proportional representation (8th, Grand National Party); 30 May 2008–16 July 2010	Succeeded by
Preceded by Park Soo-hyun (Gongju, South Chungcheong); Lee Wan-koo (Buyeo–Cheongyang, South Chungcheong)	Member of the National Assembly for Gongju–Buyeo–Cheongyang (South Chungcheong); 30 May 2016–22 April 2024	Succeeded by Park Soo-hyun
Political offices
Preceded by Park Heong-joon	Senior Secretary to the President for Political Affairs; 16 July 2010–10 June 2011	Succeeded by Kim Hyo-jae
Preceded by Yoon Won-joong	Secretary-General of the National Assembly; 1 January 2013–28 February 2014	Succeeded by Park Heong-joon
Preceded by Lee Joo-young; Joo Seung-yong	Deputy Speaker of the National Assembly; Serving with Kim Sang-hee, Kim Young-joo; 31 August 2021–10 November 2022	Succeeded by Chung Woo-taik
Preceded by Lee Kwan-sub	Chief of Staff to the President; 22 April 2024–4 June 2025	Succeeded by Kang Hoon-sik
Party political offices
Preceded by Won Yoo-chul	Floor Leader of the Saenuri Party; 3 May 2016–16 December 2016	Succeeded by Chung Woo-taik
Preceded by Won Yoo-chul (Acting)	Leader of the Saenuri Party (Acting); 11 May 2016–1 June 2016	Succeeded by Kim Hee-ok (Interim)
Preceded by Kweon Seong-dong (Acting)	Leader of the People Power Party (Interim); 8 September 2022–8 March 2023	Succeeded by Kim Gi-hyeon
