= Go Jin-hwa =

South Korean politician (1963–2024)

- 고진화

Member of the National Assembly of South Korea for Yeongdeungpo A
- In office 30 May 2004 – 29 May 2008
- Preceded by: Kim Myung-seop
- Succeeded by: Jeon Yeo-ok

Personal details
- Born: 27 February 1963 Yeongwol County, South Korea
- Died: 22 October 2024 (aged 61)
- Party: GNP
- Education: Sungkyunkwan University; Johns Hopkins University

Go Jin-hwa (Korean: 고진화; 27 February 1963 – 22 October 2024) was a South Korean politician. A member of the Grand National Party, he served in the National Assembly from 2004 to 2008.

Go died on 22 October 2024, at the age of 61.
