= Kim Sang-hee =

South Korean politician

- 김상희
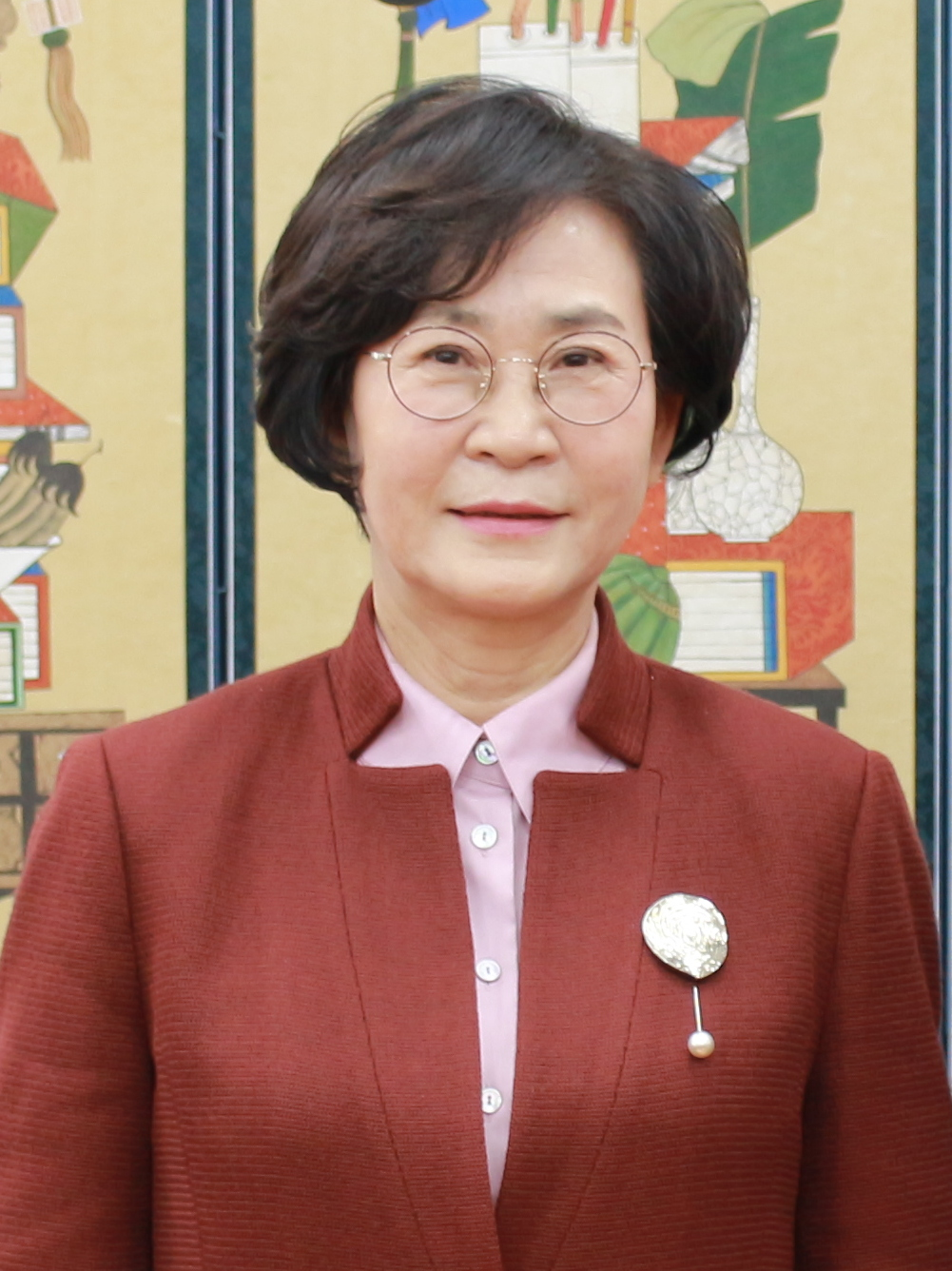

Deputy Speaker of the National Assembly
- In office 5 June 2020 – 29 May 2022; Served with Chung Jin-suk since 31 August 2021
- Preceded by: Lee Joo-young; Joo Seung-yong
- Succeeded by: Kim Young-joo

Member of the National Assembly
- In office 30 May 2012 – 29 May 2024
- Preceded by: Cha Myong-jin
- Succeeded by: Lee Geon-tae
- Constituency: Gyeonggi Bucheon Sosa (2012-2020); Gyeonggi Bucheon C (2020-2024)
- In office 30 May 2008 – 29 May 2012
- Constituency: Proportional representation

Personal details
- Born: 18 May 1954 (age 72) Gongju, South Korea
- Party: Democratic
- Education: Ewha Womans University
- Religion: Roman Catholic (Christian name: Crescentia)

Kim Sang-hee (Korean: 김상희; Hanja: 金相姬; born 18 May 1954) is a South Korean four-term parliamentarian currently serving as one of Deputy Speakers of National Assembly. Kim is the first woman to join the leadership of the South Korean parliament and become its deputy speaker.

Before entering politics, Kim dedicated her career in civil societies. In 2005 she received Order of Civil Merit for her advocacy work on women's rights - namely in abolishing patriarchal Hoju system and enacting special law on sexual violence - as one of heads of now-Women Link, a South Korean NGO.

She first entered politics through proportional representation for which she was on number 11 on her party's list. Since then Kim took multiple senior roles in her party and its succeeding parties such as a member of its Supreme Council, chair of its Women's Committee and its deputy floor leader. Kim was the chair of Gender Equality and Family Committee of the National Assembly from 2012 to 2014.

Kim also served as the deputy chair of Presidential Committee on Ageing Society and Population Policy led by President Moon Jae-in from 2017 to 2020.

Kim holds a bachelor's degree in pharmacy from Ewha Womans University.

== Electoral history ==
Election	Year	District	Party affiliation	Votes	Percentage of votes	Results
18th National Assembly General Election	2008	Proportional Representation (11st)	Democratic Party	4,313,645	25.17%	Elected
19th National Assembly General Election	2012	Gyeonggi Bucheon Sosa	Democratic United Party	51,300	51.62%	Won
20th National Assembly General Election	2016	Gyeonggi Bucheon Sosa	Democratic Party	46,650	43.75%	Won
21st National Assembly General Election	2020	Gyeonggi Bucheon C	Democratic Party	77,577	60.55%	Won

== Awards ==
- Order of Civil Merit by the government of South Korea (2005)
