= Sul Hoon =

South Korean politician (born 1953)

- 설훈
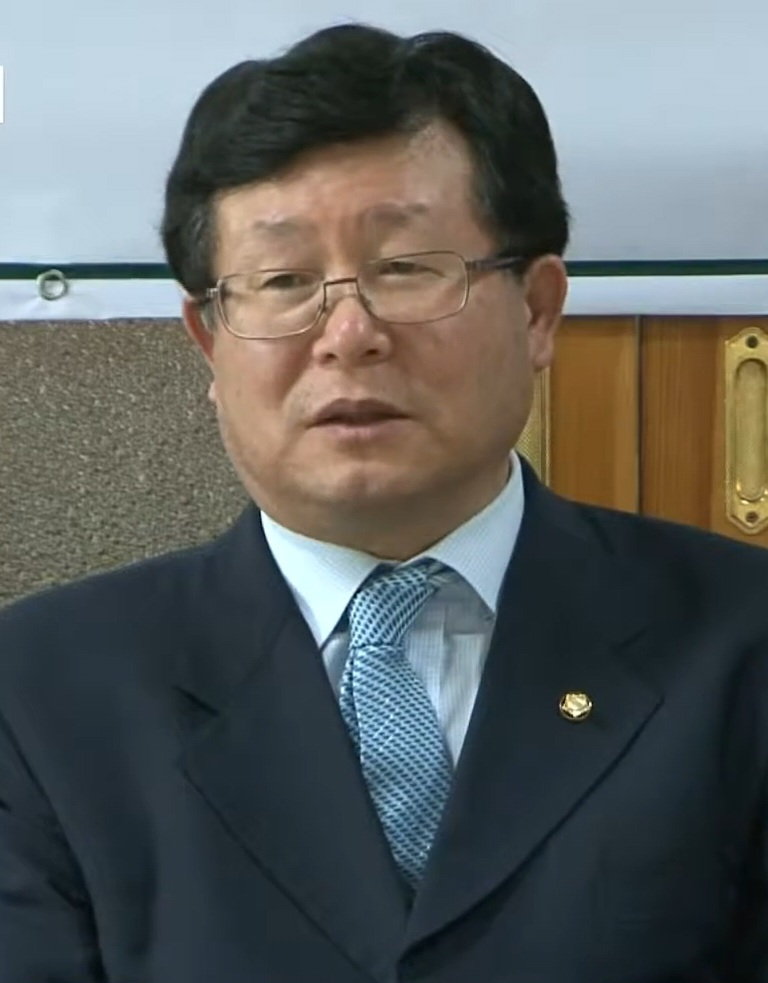

Member of the National Assembly
- In office 30 May 2016 – 29 May 2024
- Preceded by: Constituency established
- Succeeded by: Kim Gi-pyo
- Constituency: Bucheon B (Gyeonggi)
- In office 30 May 2012 – 29 May 2016
- Preceded by: Lee Sa-cheol
- Succeeded by: Constituency abolished
- Constituency: Bucheon Wonmi B (Gyeonggi)
- In office 30 May 1996 – 29 May 2004
- Preceded by: Kim Won-kil
- Succeeded by: Yoo Ihn-tae
- Constituency: Dobong B (Seoul)

Personal details
- Born: 23 April 1953 (age 73) Changwon, (Masan) South Gyeongsang Province, South Korea
- Party: Independent
- Other political affiliations: Peace Democratic Party (1988–1991); New Democratic Unionist Party (1991–1992); Democratic Party (1992–1995); National Congress for New Politics (1995–2000); Millennium Democratic Party (2000–2005); Democratic Party (2005–2007); United New Democratic Party (2007–2008); United Democratic Party (2008); Democratic Party (2008–2011); Democratic Unionist Party (2011–2013); Democratic Party (2013–2014); New Politics Alliance for Democracy (2014–2015); Democratic (2015–2024); New Future (2024); New Future Democratic (2024–2025)
- Spouse: Eo Mi-sook
- Children: 3
- Education: Korea University
- Occupation: Activist, politician

Sul Hoon (Korean: 설훈; born 23 April 1953) is a South Korean activist and politician currently serving as a member of National Assembly in Wonmi District's 2nd constituency of Bucheon. He is also one of the Vice presidents in Democratic Party of Korea since August 2018.

== Biography ==
Born at Masan (now Changwon), Sul Hoon studied history at Korea University. His father, Sul Cheol-soo, was an independence activist.

While he was studying at university, he was arrested for two times after participating for anti-dictatorship protests. At this time, he met Kim Dae-jung, who then became the President of the country.

== Political career ==
Sul Hoon started his political career in 1985, as a secretary of Kim Dae-jung. He firstly ran as the candidate of Peace Democratic Party in 1988 at Seongbuk District's 1st constituency, but defeated by independent candidate Lee Chul. He did not participate for the general election in 1992.

During the general election in 1996, Sul Hoon was the candidate from National Congress for New Politics at Dobong District's 2nd constituency, and defeated Yoo In-tae of United Democratic Party. He was re-elected in 2000. Nevertheless, he boycotted the 2004 election in order to against the impeachment of the President Roh Moo-hyun.

He returned as an MP in 2012 and was re-elected in 2016. During the party leadership election in 2018, he contested as the party's vice presidential candidate and elected as 3rd.

== Criticism ==
During the presidential election in 2002, Sul Hoon claimed that Lee Hoi-chang, the candidate of Grand National Party accepted $200,000 from Choi Kyu-seon. He was accused of spreading fake news and sentenced 1.5-year of imprisonment in 2005.

He was widely criticised in 2019, after he mentioned that the President Moon Jae-in's approval rating was dropping among the youths as the majority of them was not educated properly under both Lee Myung-bak and Park Geun-hye's administration.

== See also ==
- 2019 South Korean Capitol attack

== Election results ==
Year	Elections	Constituency	Political party	Votes (%)	Remarks
1988	13th National Assembly General Election	Seongbuk A (Seoul)	PDP	29,482 (22.59%)	Defeated (3rd)
1996	15th National Assembly General Election	Dobong B (Seoul)	NCNP	25,972 (31.48%)	Won
2000	17th National Assembly General Election	Dobong B (Seoul)	MDP	33,842 (45.28%)	Won
2012	19th National Assembly General Election	Bucheon Wonmi B (Gyeonggi)	DUP	63,758 (56.10%)	Won
2016	21st National Assembly General Election	Bucheon Wonmi B (Gyeonggi)	Democratic	57,198 (42.85%)	Won
2020	18th National Assembly General Election	Bucheon B (Gyeonggi)	Democratic	80,889 (54.90%)	Won
2024	22nd National Assembly General Election	Bucheon B (Gyeonggi)	New Future	9,087 (6.15%)	Defeated (3rd)
