= Dobong B =

Constituency in Seoul, South Korea

- Single-member constituency for the National Assembly
- Location of the constituency
- District(s): Dobong District (part)
- Region: Seoul
- Electorate: 138,197 (2024)

Current constituency
- Created: 1996
- Seats: 1
- Party: Democratic Party
- Member: Oh Gi-hyoung
- Created from: Dobong B, Dobong C

Dobong B (Korean: 도봉구 을) is a constituency of the National Assembly of South Korea. The constituency consists of parts of Dobong District, Seoul. As of 2024, 136,197 eligible voters were registered in the constituency. The constituency was created in 1996 after being reorganized from the former Dobong B and Dobong C constituencies.

== History ==
Since its establishment, Dobong B has more often voted for centre-left, liberal parties to represent the constituency and is thus considered a stronghold for the Democratic Party.

Sul Hoon of the centrist-liberal National Congress for New Politics was the first member to represent the constituency, having narrowly beat out Paik Young-ki of the centre-right Grand National Party. Sul won re-election in 2000, once again defeating Paik. However, Sul did not run for re-election in 2004 after being indicted on falsely claiming that then presidential candidate Lee Hoi-chang had received $200,000 from businessman Choi Kyu-sun. Sul was succeeded by Yoo Ihn-tae of the liberal Uri Party, receiving 47.37% of the vote. Yoo unsuccessfully ran for re-election in 2008 and was defeated by Kim Seon-dong of the Grand National Party. A return match between Yoo and Kim was held in 2012 which saw Yoo win back the seat. Ahead of the 2016 South Korean legislative election, the Democratic Party "cut-off" Yoo from re-nomination, instead nominating lawyer Oh Gi-hyoung for the constituency. Kim Seon-dong of the conservative Saenuri Party emerged victorious in a three-way race which saw vote splitting between the Democratic Party and the newly formed centrist People Party. In the following election, Oh Gi-hyoung defeated Kim by a margin of more than seven points, winning back the seat for Democratic Party. Oh won re-election in 2024, garnering 52.83% of the vote and defeated People Power Party challenger Kim Seon-dong in a one-on-one match.

== Boundaries ==
The constituency encompasses the neighborhoods of Ssangmun 2-dong, Ssangmun 4-dong, Banghak-dong, and Dobong-dong. The constituency borders Uijeongbu A to the north, Dongducheon–Yangju–Yeoncheon A to the northwest, Gangbuk A to the west, Dobong A to the south, and Nowon B to the east.

== List of members of the National Assembly ==
Election	Member	Party	Dates	Notes
1996	Sul Hoon	National Congress	1996–2004	
2000	Sul Hoon	Millennium Democratic	1996–2004	
2004	Yoo Ihn-tae	Uri	2004–2008	Senior Secretary for Political Affairs (2003–2004)
2008	Kim Seon-dong	Grand National	2008–2012	Secretary of the Office of the President (1993–1997)
2012	Yoo Ihn-tae	Democratic United	2012–2016	Secretary-General of the National Assembly (2018–2020)
2016	Kim Seon-dong	Saenuri	2016–2020	Secretary for Political Affairs (2013); Chairman of the Korea Youth Work Agency (2013–2015); Secretary General of the United Future Party·People Power Party (2020)
2020	Oh Gi-hyoung	Democratic	2020–present	
2024	Oh Gi-hyoung	Democratic	2020–present	

== Election results ==
=== 2024 ===
Legislative Election 2024: Dobong B
Party	Candidate	Votes	%	±%
Democratic	Oh Gi-hyoung	50,384	52.83	▼0.18
People Power	Kim Seon-dong	44,969	47.16	▲1.53
Rejected ballots		1,135	–	
Turnout		96,488	69.82	▲3.32
Registered electors		138,197		
Democratic hold		Swing		

=== 2020 ===
Legislative Election 2020: Dobong B
Party	Candidate	Votes	%	±%
Democratic	Oh Gi-hyoung	51,756	53.01	▲16.61
United Future	Kim Seon-dong	44,554	45.63	▲1.91
Independent	Choi Soon-ja	683	0.69	new
National Revolutionary	Kim Kwan-seok	641	0.65	new
Rejected ballots		1,292	–	
Turnout		98,926	66.5	▲7.27
Registered electors		148,641		
Democratic gain from United Future		Swing		

=== 2016 ===
Legislative Election 2016: Dobong B
Party	Candidate	Votes	%	±%
Saenuri	Kim Seon-dong	38,788	43.72	▼3.47
Democratic	Oh Gi-hyoung	32,291	36.40	▼14.66
People	Son Dong-ho	17,626	19.87	new
Rejected ballots		1,213	–	
Turnout		89,918	59.23	▲3.18
Registered electors		151,799		
Saenuri gain from Democratic		Swing		

=== 2012 ===
Legislative Election 2012: Dobong B
Party	Candidate	Votes	%	±%
Democratic United	Yoo Ihn-tae	43,784	51.06	▲5.12
Saenuri	Kim Seon-dong	40,464	47.19	▼4.99
Liberty Forward	Park Young-dae	1,497	1.74	new
Rejected ballots		541	–	
Turnout		86,286	56.05	▲8.88
Registered electors		153,957		
Democratic United gain from Saenuri		Swing		

=== 2008 ===
Legislative Election 2008: Dobong B
Party	Candidate	Votes	%	±%
Grand National	Kim Seon-dong	37,228	52.18	▲16.21
United Democratic	Yoo Ihn-tae	32,777	45.94	new
Family Party for Peace and Unity	Hwang In-chun	1,329	1.86	new
Rejected ballots		608	–	
Turnout		71,942	47.17	▼14.28
Registered electors		152,530		
Grand National gain from United Democratic		Swing		

=== 2004 ===
Legislative Election 2004: Dobong B
Party	Candidate	Votes	%	±%
Uri	Yoo Ihn-tae	42,564	47.37	new
Grand National	Paik Young-ki	32,323	35.97	▼4.22
Millennium Democratic	Lee Chul-yong	5,879	6.54	▼38.74
United Liberal Democrats	Jang Il	4,688	5.21	▼3.94
Democratic Labor	Pyo Eun-tae	4,398	4.89	new
Rejected ballots		650	–	
Turnout		90,502	61.45	▲7.26
Registered electors		147,288		
Uri gain from Millennium Democratic		Swing		

=== 2000 ===
Legislative Election 2000: Dobong B
Party	Candidate	Votes	%	±%
Millennium Democratic	Sul Hoon	33,842	45.28	new
Grand National	Paik Young-ki	30,039	40.19	▲11.19
United Liberal Democrats	Jang Il	6,839	9.15	▼3.46
Youth Progressive	Kim Mi-seok	2,117	2.83	new
Independent	Chung Jin-woo	1,000	1.33	new
Independent	Choi Soon-ja	894	1.19	▲0.2
Rejected ballots		616	–	
Turnout		75,347	54.19	▼8.09
Registered electors		139,031		
Millennium Democratic hold		Swing		

=== 1996 ===
Legislative Election 1996: Dobong B
Party	Candidate	Votes	%	±%
National Congress	Sul Hoon	25,972	31.48	–
New Korea	Paik Young-ki	23,926	29.00	–
Democratic	Yoo Ihn-tae	21,376	25.91	–
United Liberal Democrats	Jang Il	10,404	12.61	–
Independent	Choi Soon-ja	822	0.99	–
Rejected ballots		1,257	–	
Turnout		83,757	62.28	–
Registered electors		134,495		
National Congress win (new seat)				

== See also ==
- List of constituencies of the National Assembly of South Korea
