= Kim Young-joo =

South Korean politician

- 김영주
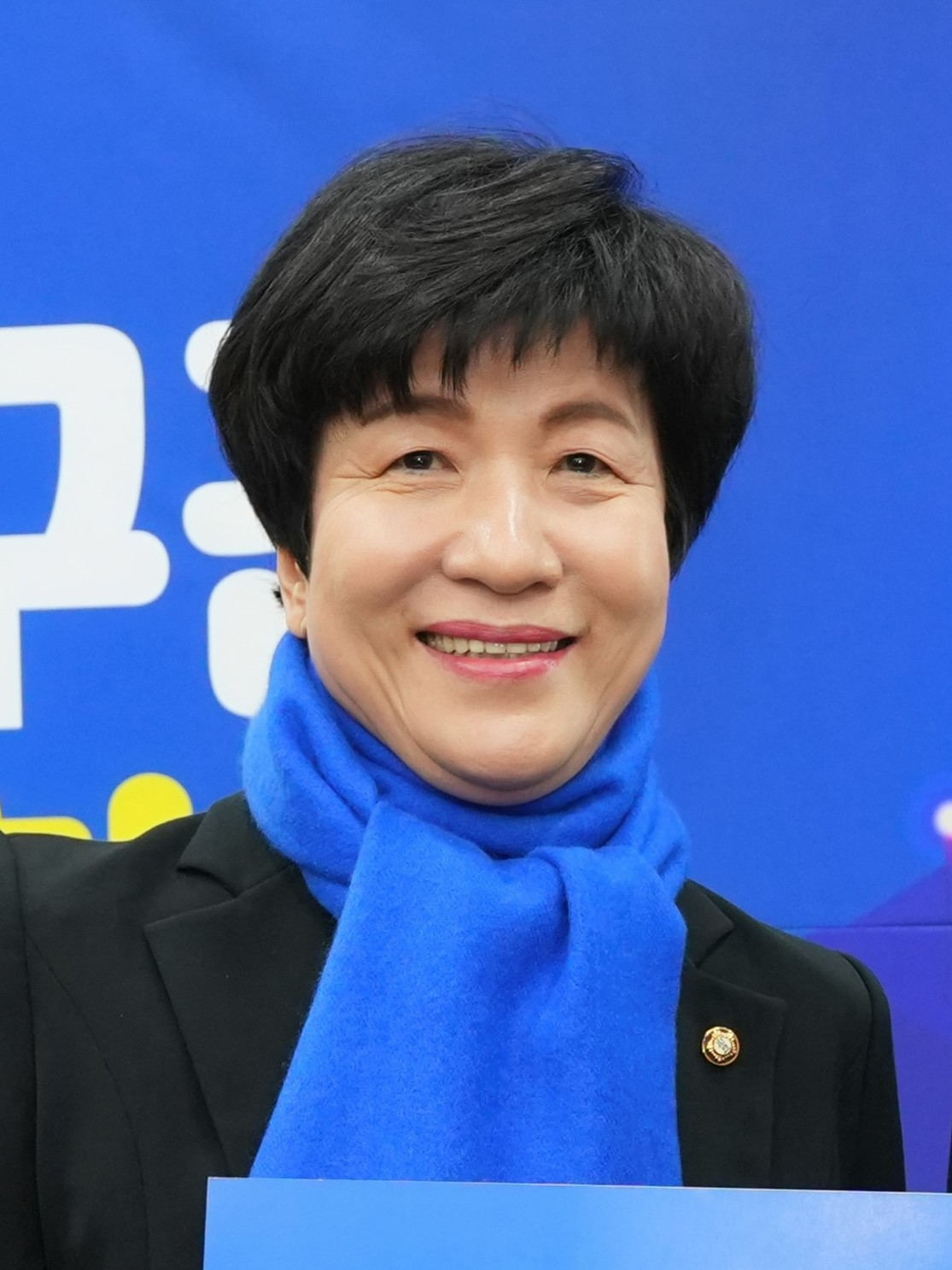
- Kim in 2024

Deputy Speaker of the National Assembly
- In office 4 July 2022 – 2 May 2024 Serving with Chung Jin-suk (2022); Chung Woo-taik (2022–2024)
- Preceded by: Kim Sang-hee
- Succeeded by: Lee Hack-young

Minister of Employment and Labor
- In office 14 August 2017 – 21 September 2018
- President: Moon Jae-in
- Prime Minister: Lee Nak-yon
- Succeeded by: Lee Jae-gap

Member of the National Assembly
- In office 30 May 2012 – 29 May 2024
- Preceded by: Jeon Yeo-ok
- Succeeded by: Chae Hyeon-il
- Constituency: Yeongdeungpo A (Seoul)
- In office 30 May 2004 – 29 May 2008
- Constituency: Proportional representation

Personal details
- Born: 27 July 1955 (age 71) Seoul, South Korea
- Party: People Power (2024–present)
- Other political affiliations: NCNP (1999–2000); MDP (2000–2003); Uri (2003–2007); GUDNP (2007–2008); UDP (2008); Democratic (2008) (2008–2011); DUP (2011–2013); Democratic (2013) (2013–2014); NPAD (2014–2015); Democratic (2015) (2015–2024)
- Education: Korea National Open University; Sogang University

Kim Young-joo (Korean: 김영주; Hanja: 金榮珠; born 27 July 1955) is a South Korean politician and former basketball player previously served as President Moon Jae-in's first Minister of Employment and Labor from 2017 to 2018. She is the first woman to lead the Labour Ministry since its foundation in 1981 and its preceding agency in 1948.

She was a basketball player for Seoul Trust Bank (now absorbed into Hana Bank). She then worked at the Bank where she reportedly faced gender discrimination which led her to join its trade union. She later joined its leadership board and eventually became the deputy chair of the Korea Financial Industry Union and the first woman to assume this post.

In 1999 she first entered politics when she was recruited by Kim Dae-jung. She has consistently took senior roles in her party and its succeeding parties such as its secretary-general and one of elected members of its Supreme Council.

== Minister of Employment and Labor (2017–2018) ==
She was nominated and appointed as President Moon Jae-in's first Minister of Employment and Labor. She was replaced after facing opposition parties and the media's strong critics of the "decrease in weekly working hours and increase in minimum wage" policy, which she was responsible for as labour minister and was one of the main socio-economic campaign promises of Moon, throughout her time as Minister.

Kim completed her tertiary education in her 40s - an undergraduate degree in Korean language and literature from Korea National Open University and a master's degree in economics from Sogang University.

== Resignation of the DPK to join the PPP ==
Kim Young-joo resigned from the Democratic Party of Korea (DPK) to join the People's Power Party (PPP); on February 19, 2024; a few months before the legislatives elections in South Korea; bringing the vice-presidency of the National Assembly to 2 members of the same party instead of one for each.

== Electoral history ==
Election	Year	District	Party affiliation	Votes	Percentage of votes	Results
16th National Assembly General Election	2000	Proportional representation (39th)	Millennium Democratic Party	6,780,625	35.9%	Not Elected
17th National Assembly General Election	2004	Proportional representation (13rd)	Uri Party	8,145,824	38.26%	Elected
18th National Assembly General Election	2008	Seoul Yeongdeungpo A	United Democratic Party	34,163	42.53%	Defeated (2nd)
19th National Assembly General Election	2012	Seoul Yeongdeungpo A	Democratic United Party	52,232	52.87%	Won
20th National Assembly General Election	2016	Seoul Yeongdeungpo A	Democratic Party	49,935	45.28%	Won
21st National Assembly General Election	2020	Seoul Yeongdeungpo A	Democratic Party	72,445	56.26%	Won
22nd National Assembly General Election	2024	Seoul Yeongdeungpo A	People Power Party	55,913	41.67%	Defeated (2nd)
