= Kim Seon-dong (politician, born 1963) =

South Korean politician (born 1963)

Secretary-General of the United Future Party
- In office 28 May 2020 – 14 October 2020 (People Power Party since 2 September 2020)
- President: Joo Ho-young (acting); Kim Chong-in (interim)
- Preceded by: Park Wan-su
- Succeeded by: Cheong Yang-seog

Member of the National Assembly for Dobong B (Seoul)
- In office 30 May 2016 – 29 May 2020
- Preceded by: Yoo In-tae
- Succeeded by: Oh Gi-hyoung
- In office 30 May 2008 – 29 May 2012
- Preceded by: Yoo In-tae
- Succeeded by: Yoo In-tae

Personal details
- Born: 9 October 1963 (age 63) Wonju, Gangwon Province, South Korea
- Party: People Power
- Other political affiliations: DLP (1990–1993); Independent (1993–1997); GNP (1997–2012); Saenuri (2012–2017); Liberty Korea (2017–2020); UFP (2020)
- Education: Korea University
- Occupation: Politician

Korean name
- Hangul: 김선동
- RR: Gim Seondong
- MR: Kim Sŏndong

Kim Seon-dong (Korean: 김선동, born 9 October 1963) is a South Korean politician who served as the Secretary-General of the United Future Party (UFP; People Power Party since 2 September 2020) from 28 May 2020 until his resignation on 14 October 2020. Prior to this, he was the Member of the National Assembly for Seoul Dobong B constituency (2008–2012; 2016-2020).

== Career ==
Kim entered to politics as the Administrative Secretary of the Office of the President under Kim Young-sam cabinet. He was also an aide to the Grand National Party (GNP) presidential candidate Lee Hoi-chang during the 2002 presidential election.

He was firstly elected to the National Assembly in 2008 election, defeating the United Democratic Party (UDP) candidate Yoo In-tae. However, he lost to Yoo in 2012 election; he could only made a comeback when Yoo was not selected the Democratic candidate prior to 2016 election.

He is a pro-Park Geun-hye figure but not a hardliner. During the 1st term as an MP, he was a member of Minbon 21, a GNP sub-group formed by its 1st term reformist MPs.

In 2019, he unsuccessfully contested for the Liberty Korea Party (LKP) parliamentary leadership. In 2020 election, he contested under the United Future Party (UFP) banner but lost to Oh Gi-hyoung, whom he used to defeat 4 years ago. On 28 May, he was appointed the Secretary-General of the UFP, replacing the incumbent Park Wan-su. He resigned from the position on 14 October.

== Election results ==
Year	Elections	Constituency	Political party	Votes (%)	Remarks
2008	18th National Assembly General Election	Dobong B (Seoul)	GNP	37,228 (52.18%)	Won
2012	19th National Assembly General Election	Dobong B (Seoul)	Saenuri	40,464 (47.19%)	Defeated (2nd)
2016	20th National Assembly General Election	Dobong B (Seoul)	Saenuri	38,788 (43.72%)	Won
2020	21st National Assembly General Election	Dobong B (Seoul)	UFP	44,554 (45.63%)	Defeated (2nd)
2024	22nd National Assembly General Election	Dobong B (Seoul)	PPP	44,969 (47.16%)	Defeated (2nd)
