= Yeongdeungpo A =

Constituency in Seoul, South Korea

- Single-member constituency for the National Assembly
- Location of the constituency
- District(s): Yeongdeungpo District (part)
- Region: Seoul
- Electorate: 187,997 (2020)

Current constituency
- Created: 1988
- Seats: 1
- Party: Democratic Party
- Member: Chae Hyeon-il
- Created from: Yeongdeungpo

Yeongdeungpo A (Korean: 영등포구 갑) is a constituency of the National Assembly of South Korea. The constituency consists of portions of Yeongdeungpo District, Seoul. As of 2020, 187,997 eligible voters were registered in the constituency. The constituency was created in 1988 from the Yeongdeungpo constituency.

== History ==
Throughout its history, Yeongdeungpo A has voted for members of both liberal and conservative parties, however the liberal Democratic Party's dominance in recent elections has made it a safe district for the Democratic Party in recent years. Chang Suk-hwa of the centrist-liberal Reunification Democratic Party was the first member to represent the constituency, and won re-election in 1992. However, he was defeated by the conservative New Korea Party's Kim Myung-seop in 1996. Kim won re-election in 2000 as a member of the liberal Millennium Democratic Party. He was succeeded by Ko Jin-hwa of the conservative Grand National Party, who won in the 2004 election.

In the course of the 2008 South Korean legislative election, incumbent Ko Jin-hwa, a moderate member of the Grand National Party was not nominated for re-election in the Yeongdeungpo A constituency. Jeon Yeo-ok, a staunch conservative considered to be a member of the party's right-wing, was nominated in the constituency instead. Jeon went on to win the constituency in 2008. Jeon left the Saneuri Party (successor to the Grand National Party) ahead of the 2012 legislative election after losing the party's nomination for the constituency to Park Sun-kyu. However, Kim Young-joo of the liberal Democratic United Party won the general election, defeating Park Sun-kyu by more than 7 points. Kim won re-election in 2016 and 2020, widening her margin of victory to 18 points.

Kim Young-joo left the Democratic Party ahead of the 2024 South Korean legislative election, citing that she felt belittled and humiliated by the party's leadership after she was informed that her performance in the National Assembly was evaluated as "among the bottom 20 percent" by the party. She officially joined the ruling conservative People Power Party on March 4, 2024. She subsequently ran as the People Power Party candidate for Yeongdeungpo A in the 2024 legislative election, but was defeated by Chae Hyeon-il of the Democratic Party.

== Boundaries ==
The constituency encompasses the neighborhoods of Singil 3-dong, Dangsan 1-dong, Dangsan 2-dong, Yangpyeong 1-dong, Yangpyeong 2-dong, Yeongdeungpo-dong, Dorim-dong, and Mullae-dong.

== List of members of the National Assembly ==
Election	Member	Party	Dates	Notes
1988	Chang Suk-hwa	Reunification Democratic	1988–1996	
1992	Chang Suk-hwa	Democratic	1988–1996	
1996	Kim Myung-seop	New Korea	1996–2004	Left the Millennium Democratic Party on November 1, 2002, rejoined on November 16, 2002 Joined the Uri Party in 2003
2000	Kim Myung-seop	Millennium Democratic (Note: member of the Uri Party from 2003)	1996–2004	Left the Millennium Democratic Party on November 1, 2002, rejoined on November 16, 2002 Joined the Uri Party in 2003
2004	Ko Jin-hwa	Grand National	2004–2008	
2008	Jeon Yeo-ok	Grand National	2008–2012	Left the Saenuri Party and joined the Korea Vision Party on March 9, 2012
2012	Kim Young-joo	Democratic United	2012–2024	Minister of Employment and Labor (2017–2018) Deputy Speaker of the National Assembly (2022–2024) Left the Democratic Party on February 19, 2024 Joined the People Power Party on March 4, 2024
2016	Kim Young-joo	Democratic (Note: member of the People Power Party since March 4, 2024)	2012–2024	Minister of Employment and Labor (2017–2018) Deputy Speaker of the National Assembly (2022–2024) Left the Democratic Party on February 19, 2024 Joined the People Power Party on March 4, 2024
2020	Kim Young-joo	Democratic	2012–2024	Minister of Employment and Labor (2017–2018) Deputy Speaker of the National Assembly (2022–2024) Left the Democratic Party on February 19, 2024 Joined the People Power Party on March 4, 2024
2024	Chae Hyeon-il	Democratic	2024–present	Mayor of Yeongdeungpo (2018–2022)

== Election results ==
=== 2024 ===
Legislative Election 2024: Yeongdeungpo A
Party	Candidate	Votes	%	±%
Democratic	Chae Hyeon-il	73,163	54.53	▼1.73
People Power	Kim Young-joo	55,913	41.67	▲3.39
Reform	Her Eun-a	5,084	3.78	new
Rejected ballots		1,663	–	
Turnout		135,823	70.2	▲1.0
Registered electors		193,458		
Democratic gain from People Power		Swing		

=== 2020 ===
Legislative Election 2020: Yeongdeungpo A
Party	Candidate	Votes	%	±%
Democratic	Kim Young-joo	72,445	56.26	+10.98
United Future	Moon Byung-ho	49,292	38.28	−1.47
Justice	Jung Jae-min	6,257	4.86	+0.98
National Revolutionary	An Seong-woo	760	0.59	new
Rejected ballots		1,335	–	
Turnout		130,099	69.2	+6.25
Registered electors		187,997		
Democratic hold		Swing		

=== 2016 ===
Legislative Election 2016: Yeongdeungpo A
Party	Candidate	Votes	%	±%
Democratic	Kim Young-joo	49,935	45.28	−7.59
Saenuri	Park Sun-kyu	43,889	39.75	−5.96
People	Kang Sin-bok	12,224	11.08	new
Justice	Jung Jae-min	4,281	3.88	new
Rejected ballots		1,048	–	
Turnout		111,327	62.95	+5.34
Registered electors		176,855		
Democratic hold		Swing		

=== 2012 ===
Legislative Election 2012: Yeongdeungpo A
Party	Candidate	Votes	%	±%
Democratic United	Kim Young-joo	52,232	52.87	+10.34
Saenuri	Park Sun-kyu	45,161	45.71	+1.96
Real Democratic	Yeo Se-hyeon	1,407	1.42	new
Rejected ballots		588	–	
Turnout		99,388	57.61	+9.45
Registered electors		172,505		
Democratic United gain from Korea Vision				

=== 2008 ===
Legislative Election 2008: Yeongdeungpo A
Party	Candidate	Votes	%	±%
Grand National	Jeon Yeo-ok	35,151	43.75	+6.79
United Democratic	Kim Young-joo	34,163	42.53	new
Pro-Park	Han Kyung-nam	7,072	8.80	new
Democratic Labor	Lee Jeong-mi	3,352	4.17	−1.75
Family Party for Peace and Unity	Kim Mun-sik	598	0.74	new
Rejected ballots		614	–	
Turnout		80,950	48.16	−17.31
Registered electors		168,087		
Grand National hold		Swing		

=== 2004 ===
Legislative Election 2004: Yeongdeungpo A
Party	Candidate	Votes	%	±%
Grand National	Ko Jin-hwa	37,230	36.96	new
Uri	Kim Myung-seop	35,584	35.33	new
Millennium Democratic	Kim Min-seok	21,033	20.88	−24.98
Democratic Labor	Hong Seung-ha	5,963	5.92	new
United Liberal Democrats	Son Seok-mo	915	0.91	−4.59
Rejected ballots		789	–	
Turnout		101,514	65.47	+12.01
Registered electors		155,056		
Grand National gain from Uri		Swing		

=== 2000 ===
Legislative Election 2000: Yeongdeungpo A
Party	Candidate	Votes	%	±%
Millennium Democratic	Kim Myung-seop	33,050	45.86	new
Grand National	Ko Jin-hwa	29,425	40.83	new
United Liberal Democrats	Kim Hyeon-ho	3,962	5.50	−7.37
Democratic People's	Kwon Gi-gyun	3,121	4.33	new
Youth Progressive	Park Seung-hwan	2,511	3.48	new
Rejected ballots		702	–	
Turnout		72,771	53.46	−8.68
Registered electors		136,121		
Millennium Democratic hold		Swing		

=== 1996 ===
Legislative Election 1996: Yeongdeungpo A
Party	Candidate	Votes	%	±%
New Korea	Kim Myung-seop	35,141	43.89	+9.91
National Congress	Chang Suk-hwa	27,774	34.69	new
United Liberal Democrats	Koo Chang-lim	10,310	12.87	new
Democratic	Han Kyung-nam	6,825	8.52	new
Rejected ballots		1,221	–	
Turnout		81,271	62.14	−7.52
Registered electors		130,781		
New Korea gain from National Congress		Swing		

=== 1992 ===
Legislative Election 1992: Yeongdeungpo A
Party	Candidate	Votes	%	±%
Democratic	Chang Suk-hwa	39,408	41.74	new
Democratic Liberal	Kim Myung-seop	32,082	33.98	new
Unification National	Kim Su-il	18,975	20.10	new
New Political Reform	Baek Cheol	3,932	4.16	new
Rejected ballots		1,210	–	
Turnout		95,607	69.66	−0.56
Registered electors		137,245		
Democratic hold		Swing		

=== 1988 ===
Legislative Election 1988: Yeongdeungpo A
Party	Candidate	Votes	%	±%
Reunification Democratic	Chang Suk-hwa	29,825	30.64	–
Peace Democratic	Kim Su-il	29,261	27.69	–
Democratic Justice	Lee Deuk-heon	24,669	25.34	–
New Democratic Republican	Ryu Gwan-seok	8,417	8.64	–
Independent	Park Han-sang	3,333	3.42	–
Our Justice	Baek Cheol	2,599	2.67	–
Hankyoreh Democratic	Kwon Hyeok-chung	1,536	1.57	–
Rejected ballots		824	–	
Turnout		98,164	70.22	–
Registered electors		139,785		
Reunification Democratic win (new seat)				

== See also ==
- List of constituencies of the National Assembly of South Korea
