= An Kyung-duk =

South Korean politician

- 안경덕
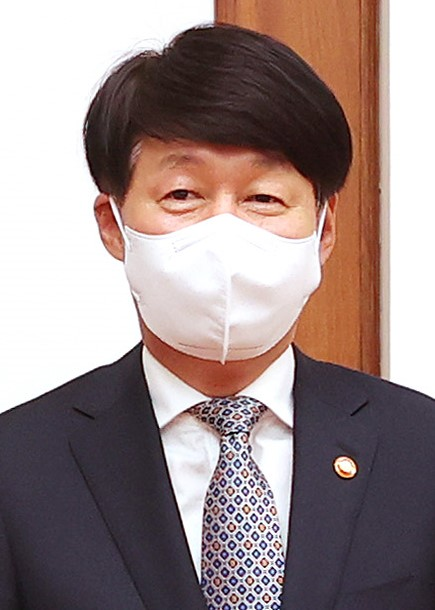

Minister of Employment and Labour
- In office 7 May 2021 – 9 May 2022
- President: Moon Jae-in
- Prime Minister: Chung Sye-kyun; Kim Boo-kyum
- Preceded by: Lee Jae-gap

Standing Member of the Economic, Social and Labour Council
- In office 20 September 2019 – 6 May 2021
- Preceded by: Park Tae-joo

Personal details
- Born: 1963 (age 62–63) Hongcheon, Gangwon Province, South Korea
- Party: Independent
- Children: 2
- Parent: An Jang-hwan (father)
- Education: Hankuk University of Foreign Studies
- Occupation: Government official

An Kyung-duk, also spelled Ahn Kyeong-deok (Korean: 안경덕, born 1963) is a South Korean government official and former Minister of Employment and Labour served under President Moon Jae-in from 2021 to 2022.

Born in Hongcheon as a son of An Jang-hwan (died in 2019), An attended Chuncheon High School and studied political diplomacy at Hankuk University of Foreign Studies. After qualifying for the Public Administration Examination in 1989, he has been working at the Minister of Employment and Labour, where he served various positions, including the Assistant Minister for Planning and Coordination. He briefly left the ministry for 9 months under the Lee Myung-bak government after being appointed the senior administrator at the Office of the President.

On 20 September 2019, An became the Standing Member of the Economic, Social and Labour Council; the position is equivalent to a deputy minister. As the Standing Member, he led a tripartite agreement between labour, management and government to overcome the COVID-19 pandemic in July 2020.

On 16 April 2021, An was nominated the new Minister of Employment and Labour, replacing the incumbent Lee Jae-gap. His nomination was welcomed by the Federation of Korean Trade Unions. He was officially appointed on 6 May, and took an oath a day later.

He is married and has 2 children.
