= Lim Gwang-hyeon =

South Korean politician

- Lim in 2026

Chief of Staff to the President
- Incumbent
- Assumed office October 14, 2026
- President: Lee Jae Myung
- Preceded by: Kang Hoon-sik

Commissioner of the National Tax Service
- In office July 23, 2025 – October 14, 2026

Member of the National Assembly
- In office May 30, 2024 – July 23, 2025
- Constituency: Proportional representation

Personal details
- Party: Democratic Party
- Education: Yonsei University; Harvard Law School

Lim Gwang-hyeon is a South Korean politician. Lim is the Presidential Chief of Staff. Lim was a member of the National Assembly, Commissioner of the National Tax Service, and Vice Commissioner of the National Tax Service.

== Early life and career ==
Lim earned a Bachelor´s degree in economics from Yonsei University and participated in Harvard Law School´s International Tax Program. He passed the 38th civil service exam in April 1995, and was appointed as a Public Administration Officer. In July 2014, he became the Inspector General of the Seoul Regional Office of the National Tax Service. In September 2020, Lim became the commissioner of the Seoul Regional Office of the National Tax Service. He became the Vice Commissioner of the National Tax Service in July 2021.

Lim became a member of the 22nd National Assembly in May 2024. Lim was the standing vice chair of the Democratic Party´s policy committee. On July 23, 2025, Lim became National Tax Service Commissioner. On October 13, 2026, Lim spoke at the National Tax Service parliamentary audit done by the Finance, Economy, and Budget Committee of the National Assembly.

== Chief of Staff to the President ==
Lim replaced Kang Hoon-sik as Chief of Staff to the President after he resigned due to several failed Cabinet nominations. On October 14, 2026, Kang announced that president Lee Jae Myung appointed Lim as his Chief of Staff 23 days after Kang offered to resign. Lim´s appointment was the first change in Chief of Staff since Lee was inaugurated. During the announcement, Kang praised Lim´s work as the National Tax Service Commissioner.

The Floor Leader of the People Power Party denounced Lim´s appointment because Lim´s career was mostly spent in tax-related positions, but the position of presidential Chief of Staff requires a comprehensive understanding of state affairs. In an X post after the announcement of Lim as the new Chief of Staff, Lee stated that he believed Lim would do better in the position than Kang. Park Sung-joon, the spokesperson for the Democratic Party also praised Lim.

== Election results ==
Year	Elections	Constituency	Political party	Votes (%)	Results
2024	22nd National Assembly General Election	Proportional representation (4th)	Democratic Alliance of Korea	7,567,459 (26.69%)	Elected
