= Chae Hyeon-il =

South Korean politician (born 1965)

- 채현일
- Chae in 2023

Member of the National Assembly
- Incumbent
- Assumed office May 30, 2024
- Preceded by: Kim Young-joo
- Constituency: Yeongdeungpo A (Seoul)

Mayor of Yeongdeungpo
- In office 1 July 2018 – 30 June 2022
- Preceded by: Cho Gil-hyeong
- Succeeded by: Choi Ho-kwon

Personal details
- Born: 26 July 1970 (age 56) Gwangju, South Korea
- Party: Democratic
- Education: Seoul National University

Chae Hyun-il (Korean: 채현일, born 26 July 1970) is a South Korean politician. He is a member of the 22nd National Assembly. He served as an administrator in the Blue House of President Moon Jae-in and as a political assistant to Seoul Mayor Park Won-soon, and was the mayor of Yeongdeungpo District in Seoul from July 2018 until June 2022.

== Election results ==
=== General elections ===
Year	Elections	Constituency	Political party	Votes (%)	Results
2024	22nd National Assembly General Election	Yeongdeungpo A (Seoul)	Democratic	73,163 (54.53%)	Won

=== Local elections ===
==== Mayor of Seoul Yeongdeungpo ====
Year	Elections	Constituency	Political party	Votes (%)	Remarks
2018	7th Iocal Election	Mayor of Seoul Yeongdeungpo	Democratic	99,863 (51.84%)	Won
2022	8th Iocal Election	Mayor of Seoul Yeongdeungpo	Democratic	86,008 (48.00%)	Defeated (2nd)
