= Chief of Staff to the President (South Korea) =

South Korean government position

Chief of Staff to the President of the Republic of Korea
- Emblem of South Korea

- Incumbent; Lim Gwang-hyeon since 15 October 2026
- Office of the President
- Appointer: President
- Term length: At the president's pleasure
- Inaugural holder: Lee Ki-poong
- Formation: 15 April 1948; 78 years ago

- Chief of Staff to the President
- Hangul: 대통령비서실장
- Hanja: 大統領秘書室長
- RR: Daetongnyeong biseosiljang
- MR: Taet'ongnyŏng pisŏsilchang

The chief of staff to the president (Korean: 대통령비서실장; Hanja: 大統領秘書室長), or chief presidential secretary, is the highest-ranking employee of the Blue House and serves as chief of staff to the president of South Korea. The chief presidential secretary is traditionally one of the first officials appointed by an incoming president. Former President Moon Jae-in was a former chief of staff.

== List of chiefs of staff ==
No.	Name	Term of office			President
No.	Name	Took office	Left office	Time in office	President
1	Lee Ki-poong	15 April 1948	October 1948	Unknown	Syngman Rhee
2	Kim Yang-cheon	October 1948	1 June 1949	Unknown	Syngman Rhee
3	Ko Jae-bong	1 June 1949	1953	Unknown	Syngman Rhee
4	Yoo Chang-joon	1953	26 April 1960	Unknown	Syngman Rhee
5	Chang Il-gang	26 April 1960	12 August 1960	108 days	Heo Jeong (acting)
6	Kim Joon-ha	18 August 1960	20 October 1960	63 days	Yun Bo-seon
7	Lee Jae-hang	21 October 1960	6 April 1962	1 year, 167 days	Yun Bo-seon
8	Lee Dong-won	6 April 1962	6 December 1963	1 year, 244 days	Park Chung Hee (acting)
9	Lee Hu-rak	10 December 1963	21 October 1969	5 years, 315 days	Park Chung Hee
10	Kim Chung-yum	21 October 1969	22 December 1978	9 years, 62 days	Park Chung Hee
11	Kim Gye-won	22 December 1978	30 October 1979	312 days	Park Chung Hee
12	Choi Kwang-soo	7 November 1979	27 August 1980	294 days	Choi Kyu-hah
13	Kim Kyung-won	27 August 1980	30 December 1981	1 year, 125 days	Chun Doo-hwan
14	Lee Beom-seok	3 January 1982	2 June 1982	150 days	Chun Doo-hwan
15	Ham Byung-chun	6 June 1982	9 October 1983	1 year, 125 days	Chun Doo-hwan
16	Kang Kyung-shik	15 October 1983	21 January 1985	1 year, 98 days	Chun Doo-hwan
17	Lee Kyu-ho	21 January 1985	14 October 1985	266 days	Chun Doo-hwan
18	Park Young-soo	15 October 1985	19 July 1987	1 year, 277 days	Chun Doo-hwan
19	Kim Yun-hwan	20 July 1987	24 February 1988	219 days	Chun Doo-hwan
20	Hong Sung-cheol	25 February 1988	17 March 1990	2 years, 20 days	Roh Tae-woo
21	Ro Jai-bong	17 March 1990	27 December 1990	285 days	Roh Tae-woo
22	Jeong Hae-chang	27 December 1990	24 February 1993	2 years, 59 days	Roh Tae-woo
23	Park Kwan-yong	25 February 1993	23 December 1994	1 year, 301 days	Kim Young-sam
24	Han Seung-soo	23 December 1994	21 December 1995	363 days	Kim Young-sam
25	Kim Kwang-il	21 December 1995	28 February 1997	1 year, 69 days	Kim Young-sam
26	Kim Yong-tae	28 February 1997	24 February 1998	361 days	Kim Young-sam
27	Kim Joong-kwon	25 February 1998	23 November 1999	1 year, 271 days	Kim Dae-jung
28	Han Kwang-ok	23 November 1999	10 September 2001	1 year, 291 days	Kim Dae-jung
29	Lee Sang-joo	10 September 2001	29 January 2002	141 days	Kim Dae-jung
30	Jeon Yun-churl	29 January 2002	15 April 2002	76 days	Kim Dae-jung
31	Park Jie-won	15 April 2002	24 February 2003	315 days	Kim Dae-jung
32	Moon Hee-sang	25 February 2003	13 July 2004	1 year, 139 days	Roh Moo-hyun
33	Kim Woo-shik	13 July 2004	19 August 2005	1 year, 37 days	Roh Moo-hyun
34	Lee Byung-wan	25 August 2005	9 March 2007	1 year, 196 days	Roh Moo-hyun
35	Moon Jae-in	12 March 2007	24 February 2008	349 days	Roh Moo-hyun
36	Yu Woo-ik	25 February 2008	10 June 2008	106 days	Lee Myung-bak
37	Jeong Jeong-gil	20 June 2008	3 June 2010	1 year, 348 days	Lee Myung-bak
38	Yim Tae-hee	16 July 2010	30 November 2011	1 year, 137 days	Lee Myung-bak
39	Ha Geum-yeol	12 December 2011	24 February 2013	1 year, 74 days	Lee Myung-bak
40	Heo Tae-yeol	25 February 2013	4 August 2013	160 days	Park Geun-hye
41	Kim Ki-chun	5 August 2013	22 February 2015	1 year, 201 days	Park Geun-hye
42	Lee Byung-ki	1 March 2015	15 May 2016	1 year, 75 days	Park Geun-hye
43	Lee Won-jong	16 May 2016	30 October 2016	167 days	Park Geun-hye
(28)	Han Kwang-ok	3 November 2016	9 May 2017	187 days	Park Geun-hye
44	Im Jong-seok	10 May 2017	8 January 2019	1 year, 243 days	Moon Jae-in
45	Noh Young-min	9 January 2019	31 December 2020	1 year, 357 days	Moon Jae-in
46	You Young-min	1 January 2021	9 May 2022	1 year, 128 days	Moon Jae-in
47	Kim Dae-ki	10 May 2022	31 December 2023	1 year, 235 days	Yoon Suk Yeol
48	Lee Kwan-sub	1 January 2024	22 April 2024	112 days	Yoon Suk Yeol
49	Chung Jin-suk	22 April 2024	4 June 2025	1 year, 43 days	Yoon Suk Yeol
50	Kang Hoon-sik	4 June 2025	14 October 2026	1 year, 132 days	Lee Jae Myung
51	Lim Gwang-hyeon	15 October 2026	incumbent	11 days	Lee Jae Myung

== See also ==
- Chief Presidential Secretary for Policy
- Office of the President (South Korea)
- Senior Presidential Secretary
- President of South Korea
- Government of South Korea
- Politics of South Korea
- White House Chief of Staff
- Chief Cabinet Secretary
- State Council of South Korea
