= Lee Jae-gap =

South Korean politician (born 1958)

- 이재갑

Minister of Employment and Labor
- In office 21 September 2018 – 6 May 2021
- President: Moon Jae-in
- Prime Minister: Lee Nak-yeon; Chung Sye-kyun
- Preceded by: Kim Young-joo
- Succeeded by: An Kyung-duk

Vice Minister of Employment and Labor
- In office 13 June 2012 – 12 March 2013
- President: Lee Myung-bak
- Prime Minister: Kim Hwang-sik
- Preceded by: Lee Gi-gwon
- Succeeded by: Jeong Hyun-ok

Personal details
- Born: 27 March 1958 (age 68) Gwangju, South Korea
- Party: Independent
- Education: Korea University; Seoul National University; Michigan State University

Korean name
- Hangul: 이재갑
- Hanja: 李載甲
- RR: I Jaegap
- MR: I Chaegap

Lee Jae-gap (Korean: 이재갑; born 27 March 1958), also known as Lee Jae-kap, is a South Korean politician who served as the minister of employment and labor from 2018 to 2021.

He was previously the deputy head of the Ministry under previous conservative president Lee Myung-bak. He was also the president of its child agency, Korea Workers' Compensation and Welfare Service, under preceding president Park Geun-hye.

After passing the state exam in 1983, Lee devoted his professional career in public service most of which is at the Ministry.

He holds three degrees - a bachelor and a master's in public administration from Korea University and Seoul National University and a doctorate in labour relations from Michigan State University.
