= Kang Hoon-sik =

South Korean politician (born 1973)

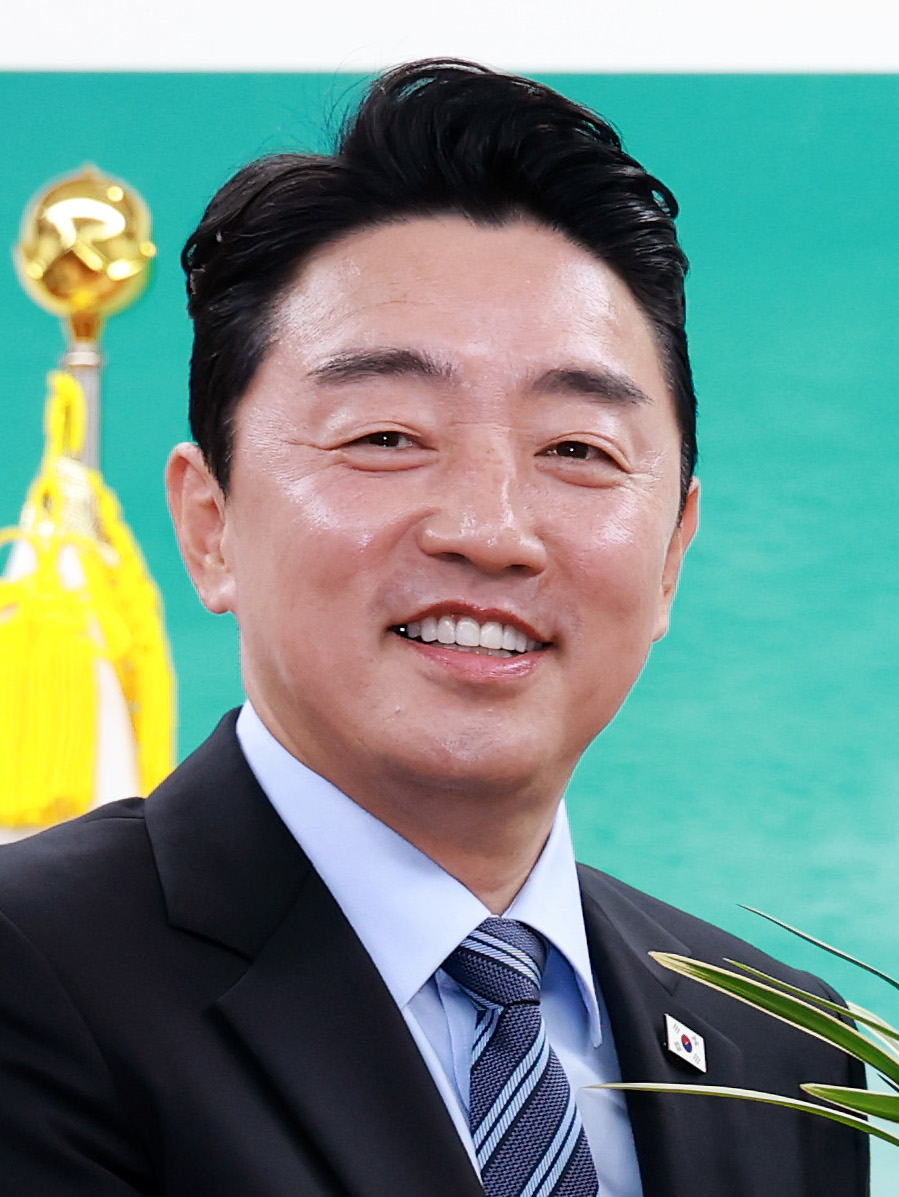
- Kang in 2026

Chief of Staff to the President
- In office 4 June 2025 – 14 October 2026
- President: Lee Jae Myung
- Preceded by: Chung Jin-suk
- Succeeded by: Lim Gwang-hyeon

Member of the National Assembly
- In office 30 May 2016 – 4 June 2025
- Preceded by: Lee Myeong-soo (Asan, South Chungcheong)
- Succeeded by: Jeon Eun-su
- Constituency: Asan B (South Chungcheong)

Personal details
- Born: 24 October 1973 (age 53) Asan, South Korea
- Party: Independent (since 2025)
- Other political affiliations: UDP (2008–2011); DUP (2011–2014); NPAD (2014–2015); Democratic (2015–2025)
- Spouse: Kim Hee-kyung
- Children: 1
- Education: Konkuk University
- Occupation: Activist, civil servant, politician

Military service
- Allegiance: South Korea
- Branch/service: Republic of Korea Armed Forces
- Years of service: 1995–1997
- Rank: Sergeant
- Unit: 76th Infantry Division

Korean name
- Hangul: 강훈식
- RR: Gang Hunsik
- MR: Kang Hunsik

Kang Hoon-sik (Korean: 강훈식; born 24 October 1973) is a South Korean politician serving as chief of staff to the president since 2025. From 2016 to 2025, he was a member of the National Assembly.

== Controversy ==
=== Violation of Public Official Election Act ===
On 11 April 2016, the South Chungcheong Provincial Election Commission reported Kang Hoon-sik to the Cheonan Branch of the Daejeon District Prosecutors' Office. On 5 October, the Cheonan Branch of the Daejeon District Prosecutors' Office indicted Kang without detention on charges of violating the Public Official Election Act (dissemination of false information). Kang was accused of falsely announcing in campaign pamphlets and debates during the 2016 South Korean legislative election that he had "attracted 14 trillion won in foreign investment companies during his time as an aide," despite not having served as an aide for attracting foreign investment. He was also accused of falsely announcing his career as an "innovation and decentralization aide" to the former Governor of Gyeonggi Province, making it seem like he had worked there for four years, despite having only served for one year and 11 months.

On 6 January 2017, the prosecution requested a fine of 5 million won for Kang Hoon-sik., On 8 February 2017, at 2:00 pm KST, the 1st Criminal Division of the Cheonan Branch of the Daejeon District Court sentenced Kang to a fine of 800,000 won. The court stated that while the wording Kang published on his election campaign materials did not objectively reflect the facts, his attendance at the highest-level investment attraction meeting chaired by the Vice Governor while serving as an aide to the Gyeonggi Province Governor indirectly contributed to attracting foreign investment and creating jobs, making it difficult to determine the degree of falsehood.

The prosecution appealed the sentence, claiming it was unfair, but on 3 July 2017 the 8th Criminal Division of the Daejeon High Court dismissed the appeal filed by the prosecution and upheld the original sentence of a fine of 800,000 won.

== Electoral history ==
Election	Year	Constituency	Political party	Votes (%)	Remarks
18th	2008	Asan (South Chungcheong)	UDP	10,628 (13.75%)	Defeated (3rd)
20th	2016	Asan B (South Chungcheong)	DP	28.472 (47.62%)	Won
21st	2020	Asan B (South Chungcheong)	DP	45,338 (59.71%)	Won
22nd	2024	Asan B (South Chungcheong)	DP	58,932 (60.35%)	Won

National Assembly of the Republic of Korea
Preceded by Lee Myeong-soo (Asan, South Chungcheong)	Member of the National Assembly from Asan B (South Chungcheong); 30 May 2016–4 June 2025	Succeeded by Jeon Eun-su
Political offices
Preceded by Chung Jin-suk	Chief of Staff to the President; 4 June 2025–14 October 2026	Succeeded by Lim Gwang-hyeon
