= Cha Myong-jin =

South Korean politician (born 1959)

- 차명진
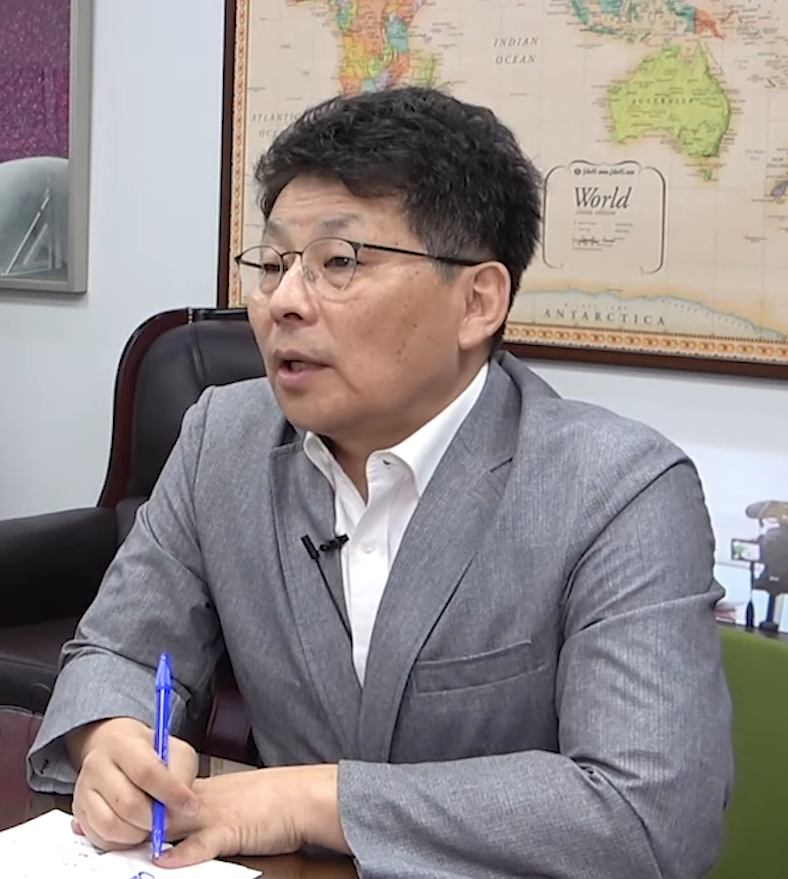

Member of the National Assembly
- In office 27 July 2006 – 29 May 2012
- Preceded by: Kim Moon-soo
- Succeeded by: Kim Sang-hee
- Constituency: Bucheon Sosa

Personal details
- Born: 14 August 1959 (age 67) Seoul, South Korea
- Party: Independent
- Other political affiliations: Popular Party (1989–1992); Democratic Liberal Party (1994–1995); New Korea Party (1995–1997); Grand National Party (1997–2012); Saenuri Party (2012–2017); Liberty Korea Party (2017–2020); United Future (2020)
- Spouse: Seo Myong-hui
- Education: Seoul National University
- Occupation: Activist, politician

Korean name
- Hangul: 차명진
- RR: Cha Myeongjin
- MR: Ch'a Myŏngjin

Cha Myong-jin (Korean: 차명진, born 14 August 1959) is a South Korean activist and politician. He served as a member of National Assembly from 2006 to 2012 at Sosa District of Bucheon, and also used to be the deputy parliamentary leader and spokesperson of Grand National Party, the predecessor of Liberty Korea Party.

Cha is a controversial figure accused of various hate speeches, as an example when he criticized the families of the victims of MV Sewol tragedy using harsh words.

== Early life ==
Cha was born in Seoul in 1959 and attended for Yongmoon High School nearby Korea University. He earned a Bachelor's Degree in Political Science and Diplomacy and a Master's Degree in Political Science from Seoul National University. His father was a refugee from North Korea.

He was detained by the Agency for National Security Planning during the early 1980s and conscripted to Gangwon. After being discharged, he joined a labour movement where he met Kim Moon-soo, the leader of the labour movement who later became the Governor of Gyeonggi as well as whom he built a close relationship with him. He then became a member of Seoul Labour Movement Union following Kim, and subsequently led its Central Committee following the detention of Kim. During this time, he met Seo Myong-hui, also graduated from Seoul National University, and married in 1988.

== Political career ==
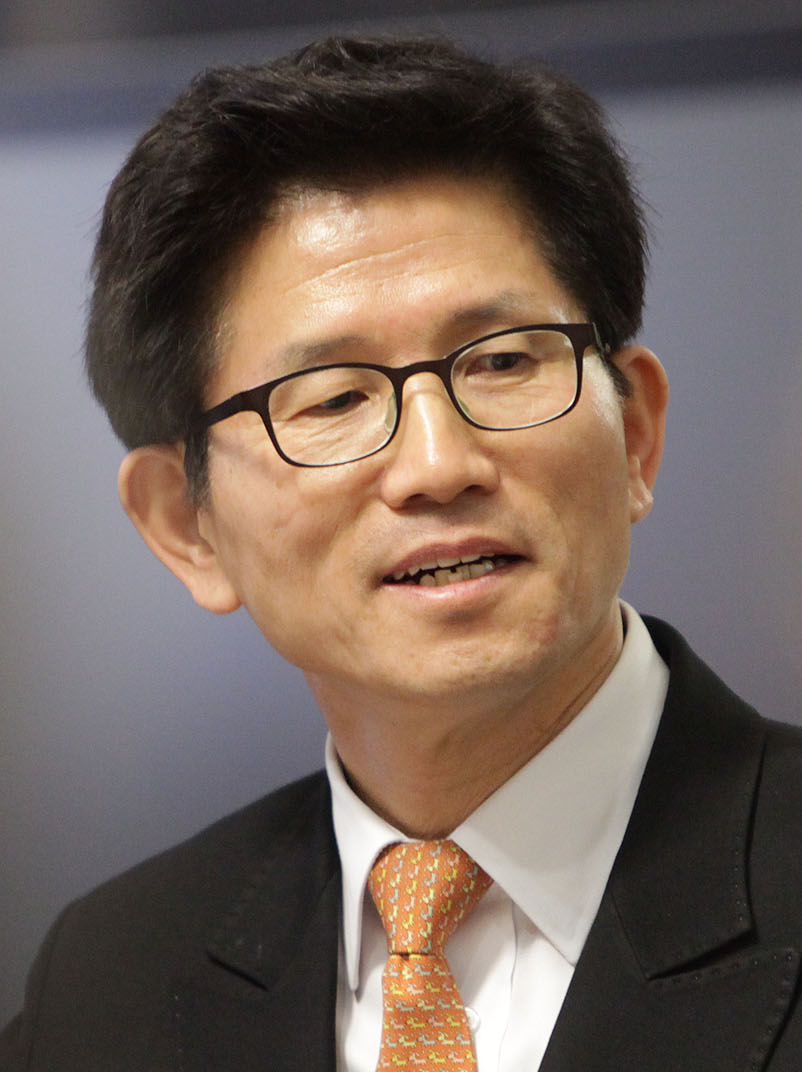
Kim Moon-soo, former Governor of Gyeonggi Province that Cha used to aid.

Cha started his political career from the left-wing Popular Party in 1989 as the party's chief in Guro 1st constituency. The party participated in legislative election in 1992 where it gained no seats and therefore was deregistered under the then electoral law abolished in 2014. According to JoongAng Ilbo, his ideology was shifted to right, from Marxism to social democracy, then capitalism during this time. Same went for Kim and both joined the right-leaning Democratic Liberal Party in 1994. Cha subsequently became an aide to Kim following the Kim's election in 1996. He also assisted Lee Hoi-chang, the former presidential candidate and the Chairman of the now-defunct Grand National Party (GNP), as well as Sohn Hak-kyu, the ex-Governor of Gyeonggi and the predecessor of Kim.

Cha ran as the MP candidate for Bucheon Sosa following the resignation of Kim running for Gyeonggi governorship. He defeated Kim Man-soo of the ruling Uri Party with a high margin. He then became the deputy parliamentary leader of his party. He served as the GNP spokesman after his victory in 2008 election.

He became well known for 2 issues in 2010, one for known as "Emperor's meal" and the other was when he brought an elaphe schrenckii into the National Assembly building.

Cha lost to Kim Sang-hui in 2012. He ran for the same constituency against him in 2016, but also defeated. He opposes LGBT rights.

On 1 July 2019, Cha declared to withdraw his endorsement towards Hwang Kyo-ahn, the-then President of the LKP, for "praising" the Trump-Kim-Moon DMZ meeting.

On 20 August 2020, it was announced that Cha tested positive for COVID-19 after having attended an anti-government rally on 15 August.

== Controversies ==
=== Remarks about Park Won-soon ===
On 11 October 2011, Cha provoked a controversy after calling Park Won-soon, the oppositions' sole candidate for the Mayor of Seoul, as "an extreme socialist supporting pro-North Korean forces". A Democratic MP named Moon Hak-jin mentioned that "from his harassment, perhaps he fears Park". Another MP named Yoo Sun-ho criticised his statement as "it is such as using viruses to kill vaccines".

=== Sinking of MV Sewol ===
On 16 April 2019, Cha faced a huge protests following his defamatory remarks against the bereaved family of MV Sewol tragedy. The previous day, he posted on Facebook that "they use their children's death till f***ed up". He also stated that "they're keep passing the buck to Park Geun-hye and Hwang Kyo-ahn but both of them are NOT related to the incident... maybe because they were brainwashed by left-wing bastards". He later deleted his post, deactivated his Facebook account, and apologised about it, but then was reported that he was not regretting about his mistake. His remarks was widely condemned by the other parties, including the ruling Democratic, Bareunmirae, PDP, etc. On 22 April, MBN banned him from performing on any of their programmes, and the bereaved of the tragedy filed a lawsuit against him. On 4 June, he reactivated his Facebook account and updated a post; several medias considered that he had no intention to apologise for his remarks.

=== Remarks about Moon Jae-in ===
On 6 June 2019, 2 days after he reactivated his Facebook, Cha again provoked another controversies for his Facebook post. In the post, he did not just call for the impeachment of the President Moon Jae-in but also urged the other MPs to call Moon as "commie bastard" for "praising" Kim Won-bong. The ruling Democratic Party asked the LKP for expelling him from the party. Bareunmirae, who also criticised Moon's remark, blamed Cha as "totally abnormal". In contrast with it, LKP President Hwang Kyo-ahn replied that the true "hate speech" is when calling a person's remark as "hate speech". Cha repeated his remarks on 17, 23 and 29 June, with additional words "dunce", and asked Moon to go to North Korea.

=== Anti-Japanese movement ===
On 28 July 2019, Cha criticised anti-Japanese movement as the "shallow idea of Moon". He added that Moon is a "nerd" who doesn't deserve to be a leader. Park Jin-sung, a poet, criticised him by writing a poem.

=== Sexual slur incidence ===
On 8 April 2020, Cha again provoked a controversy when he mentioned that some of bereaved families were involved in "threesome party" at an election debate 2 days ago. Some sources reported that the United Future Party (UFP) was considering to sack him from the party. The party president Hwang Kyo-ahn has apologised for the incident.
