= Kim Dae-ki =

South Korean civil servant (born 1956)

- 김대기
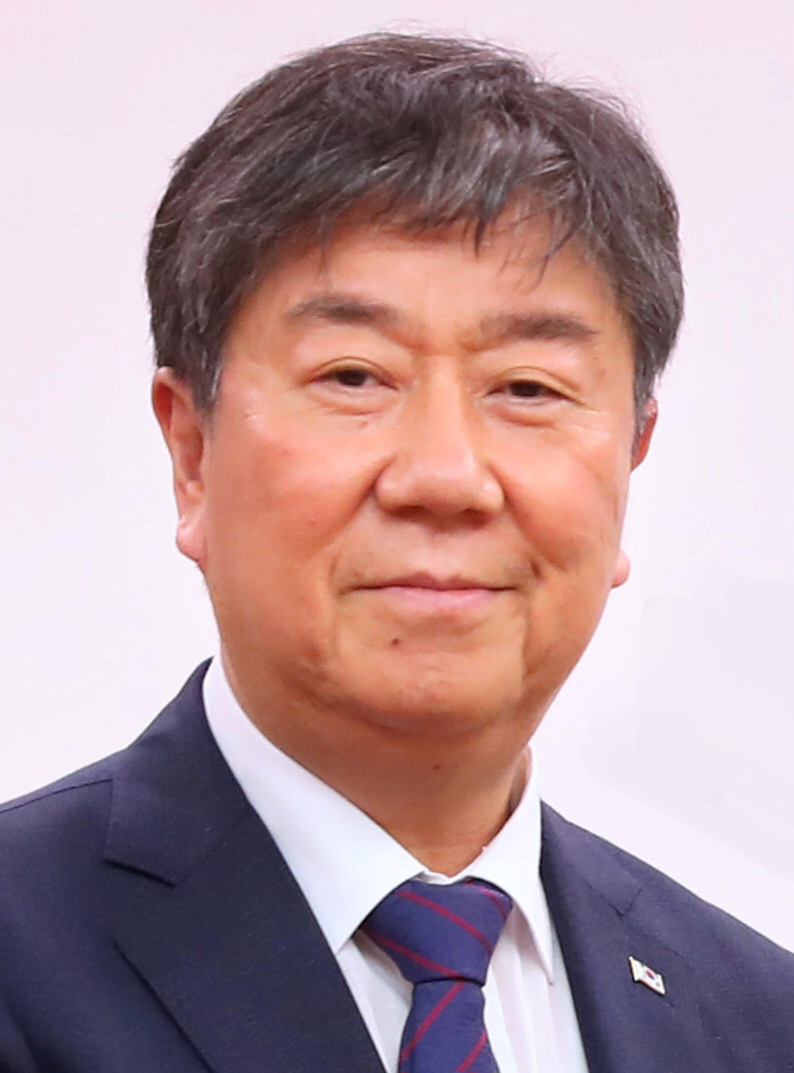

15th South Korean Ambassador to China
- Incumbent
- Assumed office TBD
- President: Yoon Suk Yeol
- Prime Minister: Han Duck-soo
- Preceded by: Jeong Jae-ho

38th Chief of Staff to the President
- In office 10 May 2022 – 28 December 2023
- President: Yoon Suk Yeol
- Prime Minister: Han Duck-soo
- Preceded by: You Young-min
- Succeeded by: Lee Kwan-sub

Personal details
- Born: 16 November 1956 (age 69) Jinju, South Gyeongsang Province
- Party: Independent

Kim Dae-ki (Korean: 김대기; born 16 November 1956) is a South Korean civil servant. He served as Chief of Staff to the President under the Yoon Suk Yeol government. In October 2024, he was appointed as the 15th Ambassador to China.

== Career ==
He was born on November 16, 1956, in the Gyeongju Kim clan. He graduated from Kyunggi High School and Seoul National University's Department of Economics, and received a master's degree in business administration from the Wharton School.

He served as the head of the National Statistical Office from March 2008 to April 2009, the second vice-minister of the Ministry of Culture, Sports and Tourism from April 2009 to August 2010, the senior secretary for economic affairs at the Blue House from February 2011 to February 2013, and the director of the Blue House policy office from August 2012 to February 2013.

In October 2024, he was appointed as the ambassador to China. He is fluent in Chinese.
