= Ojeong District =

District of Bucheon, South Korea

Coordinates: 37°31′30″N 126°47′35″E

Ojeong-gu
- Non-autonomous District
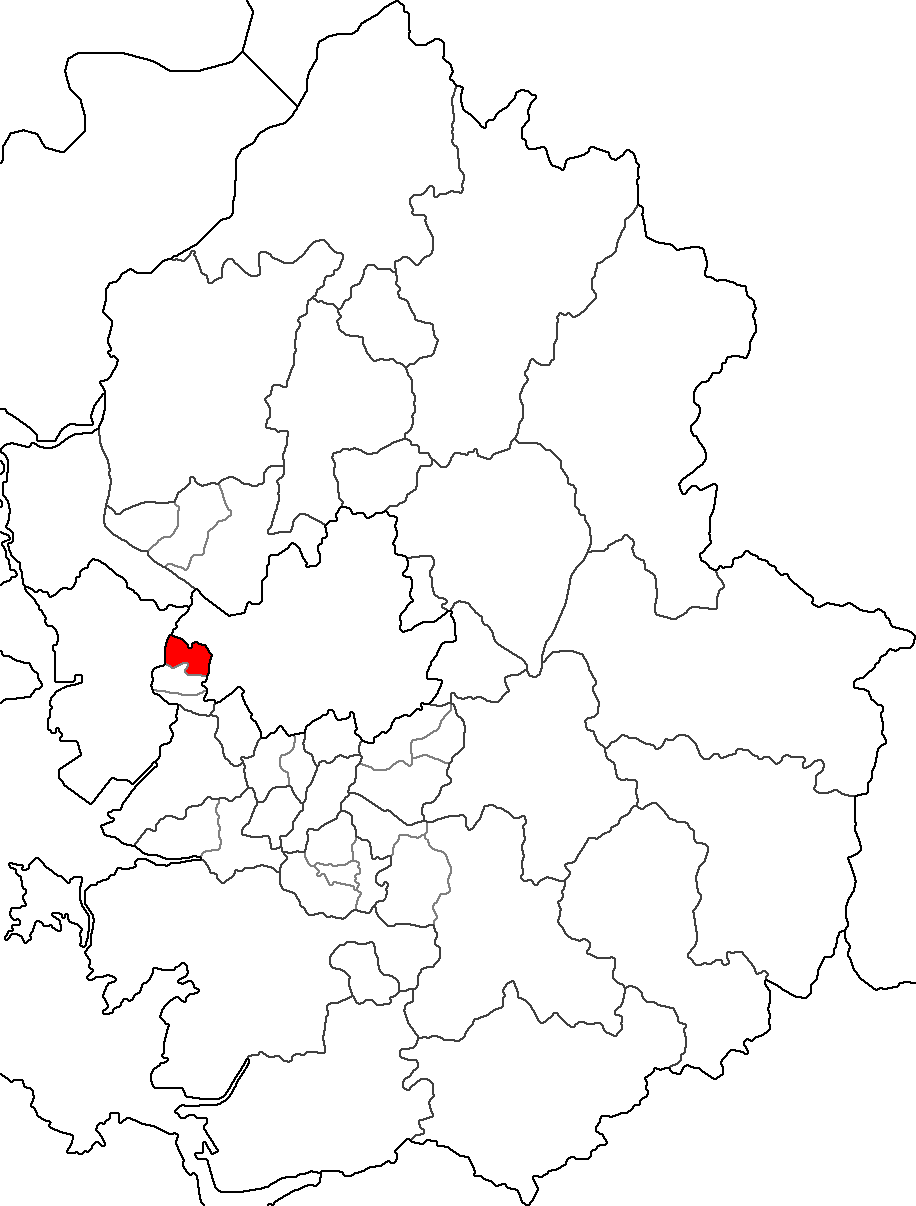
- Map of Gyeonggi-do highlighting Ojeong-gu.
- Country: South Korea
- Region: Sudogwon (Gijeon)
- Province: Gyeonggi
- City: Bucheon

Population
  - Dialect: Seoul
- Website: Ojeong-gu Office

Korean name
- Hangul: 오정구
- Hanja: 梧亭區
- RR: Ojeong-gu
- MR: Ojŏng-gu

Ojeong District (Korean: 오정구) is a district of the city of Bucheon in Gyeonggi Province, South Korea.

The district was originally abolished in July 2016 as Bucheon became a unified city without any administrative districts. However, years later, it was revived as a district by the Bucheon municipal government on January 1, 2024.

== Administrative divisions ==
Ojeong-gu is divided into the following "dong"s.

- Gogang-dong
- Gogang 1-dong
- Gogangbon-dong
- Sinheung-dong (Divided in turn into Samjeong-dong and Naedong)
- Ojeong-dong (Divided in turn into Ojeong-dong and Daejang-dong)
- Seonggok-dong (Divided in turn into Jakdong and Yeowol-dong)
- Wonjong 1 and 2 Dong

== See also ==
- Bucheon
- Sosa-gu
- Wonmi-gu

== Economy ==
Daewoo Bus Corporation has the business headquarters located here.
