= Lee Kwan-sub =

South Korean politician (born 1961)

- 이관섭

39th Chief of Staff to the President
- In office 1 January 2024 – 22 April 2024
- President: Yoon Suk Yeol
- Preceded by: Kim Dae-ki
- Succeeded by: Chung Jin-suk

Personal details
- Born: 12 July 1961 (age 65) Gyeongju, North Gyeongsang Province
- Party: Independent
- Education: Seoul National University; Harvard University

Lee Kwan-sub (Korean: 이관섭; born 12 July 1961) is a South Korean political service official. In August 2022, he was appointed to the newly created position of Senior Secretary to the President for Policy Planning as part of the expansion and reorganization of the Office of the President under the Yoon Suk Yeol administration. In December 2023, he was appointed as the successor to Kim Dae-ki, the Chief of Staff to the President, and resigned from the position in April 2024.

== Career ==
Lee was born in Gyeongju, North Gyeongsang Province, graduated from Kyeongbuk High School and Seoul National University's Department of Business Administration, and received a master's degree in public administration from Harvard University in the United States. He served as the director of the Energy and Resources Office and the Director of the Industrial Policy Office at the Ministry of Trade, Industry and Energy, and served as the Vice Minister of that ministry until 2016. He served as the president of Korea Hydro & Nuclear Power under the Ministry of Trade, Industry and Energy from 2016 until his resignation in January 2018. At the time, he had taken an opposing stance to the government during the public discussion process for the permanent shutdown of Shin-Kori Nuclear Power Plant Units 5 and 6.
