= Kim Chung-yum =

South Korean politician (1924–2020)

- 김정렴
- Official portrait, 1967

South Korean Ambassador to Japan
- In office January 1979 – September 1980

Chief Presidential Secretary
- In office 1969–1979
- Preceded by: Lee Hu-rak
- Succeeded by: Kim Gye-won

Minister of Commerce and Industry
- In office 3 October 1967 – 20 October 1969
- Preceded by: Park Choong-hoon
- Succeeded by: Lee Nak-sun

Minister of Finance
- In office January 1966 – September 1966
- Preceded by: Hong Seung-hi
- Succeeded by: Kim Hak-ryeol

Personal details
- Born: 3 January 1924 Keijō, Korea, Empire of Japan
- Died: 25 April 2020 (aged 96)
- Party: Democratic Republican; United Liberal Democrats
- Education: Clark University

- Kim Chung-yum
- Hangul: 김정렴
- Hanja: 金正濂
- RR: Gim Jeongryeom
- MR: Kim Chŏngnyŏm

Kim Chung-yum (Korean: 김정렴; Hanja: 金正濂; 3 January 1924 – 25 April 2020) was a South Korean politician. Under President Park Chung Hee, he was the longest serving chief presidential secretary in South Korean history. He also served as Minister of Finance and Minister of Commerce and Industry, playing a leading role in the country's miraculous economic development.

Kim died on April 25, 2020.

== Publications ==
- From Despair to Hope: Economic Policymaking in Korea, 1945–1979
