= Gongju =

City in South Chungcheong Province, South Korea

- Municipal city
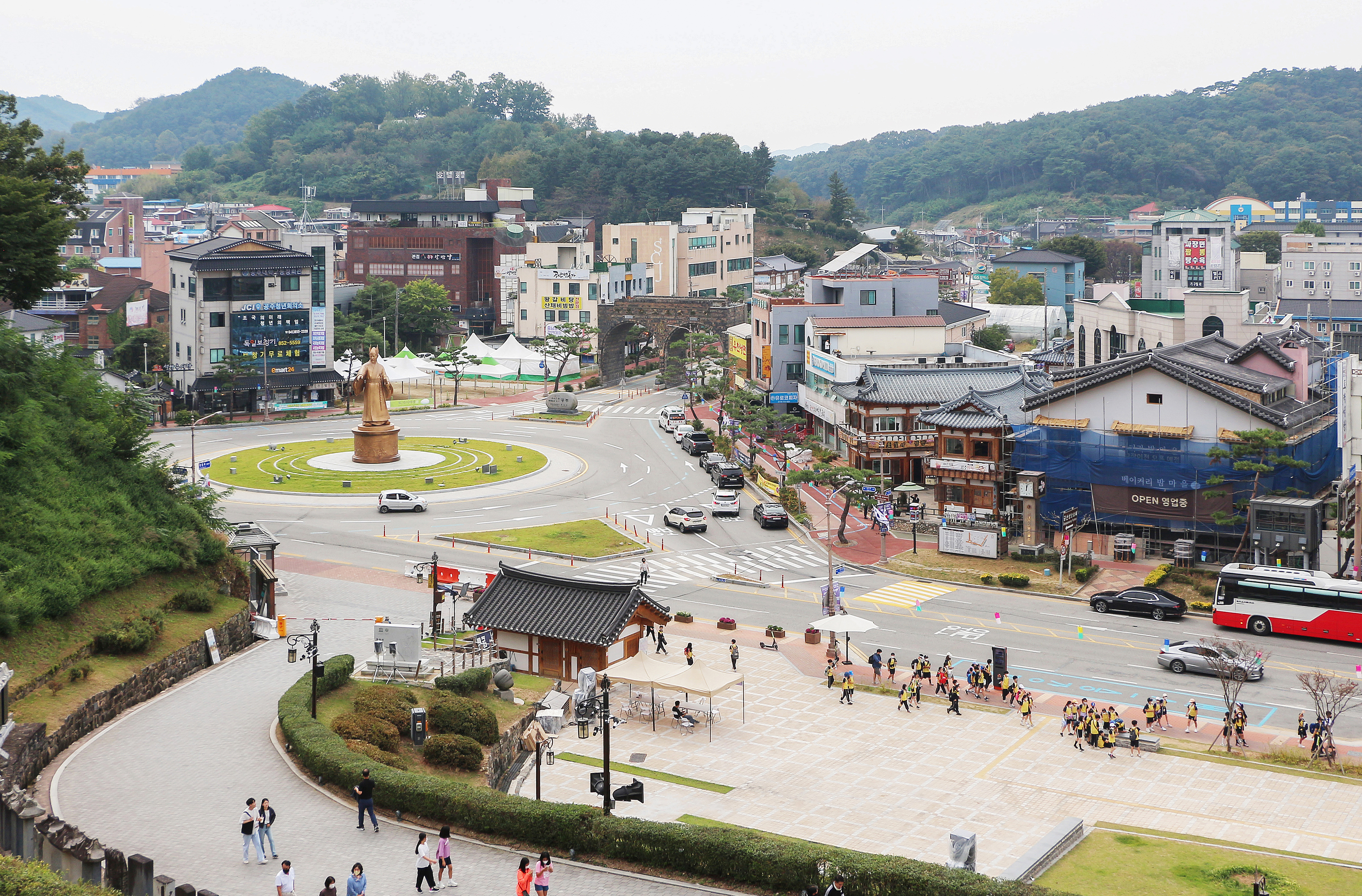
- View of Gongju

- Flag Emblem

- Location in South Korea
- Coordinates: 36°27′N 127°7′E
- Country: South Korea
- Region: Hoseo
- Administrative divisions: 1 eup, 10 myeon, 6 dong

Area
  - Total: 864.16 km^{2} (333.65 sq mi)

Population (June 2025)
  - Total: 100,714
  - Density: 124.2/km^{2} (322/sq mi)
  - Dialect: Chungcheong

Korean name
- Hangul: 공주시
- Hanja: 公州市
- RR: Gongju-si
- MR: Kongju-si

Gongju (Korean: 공주; Korean pronunciation: [koŋ.dʑu]) is a city in South Chungcheong Province, South Korea.

== History ==
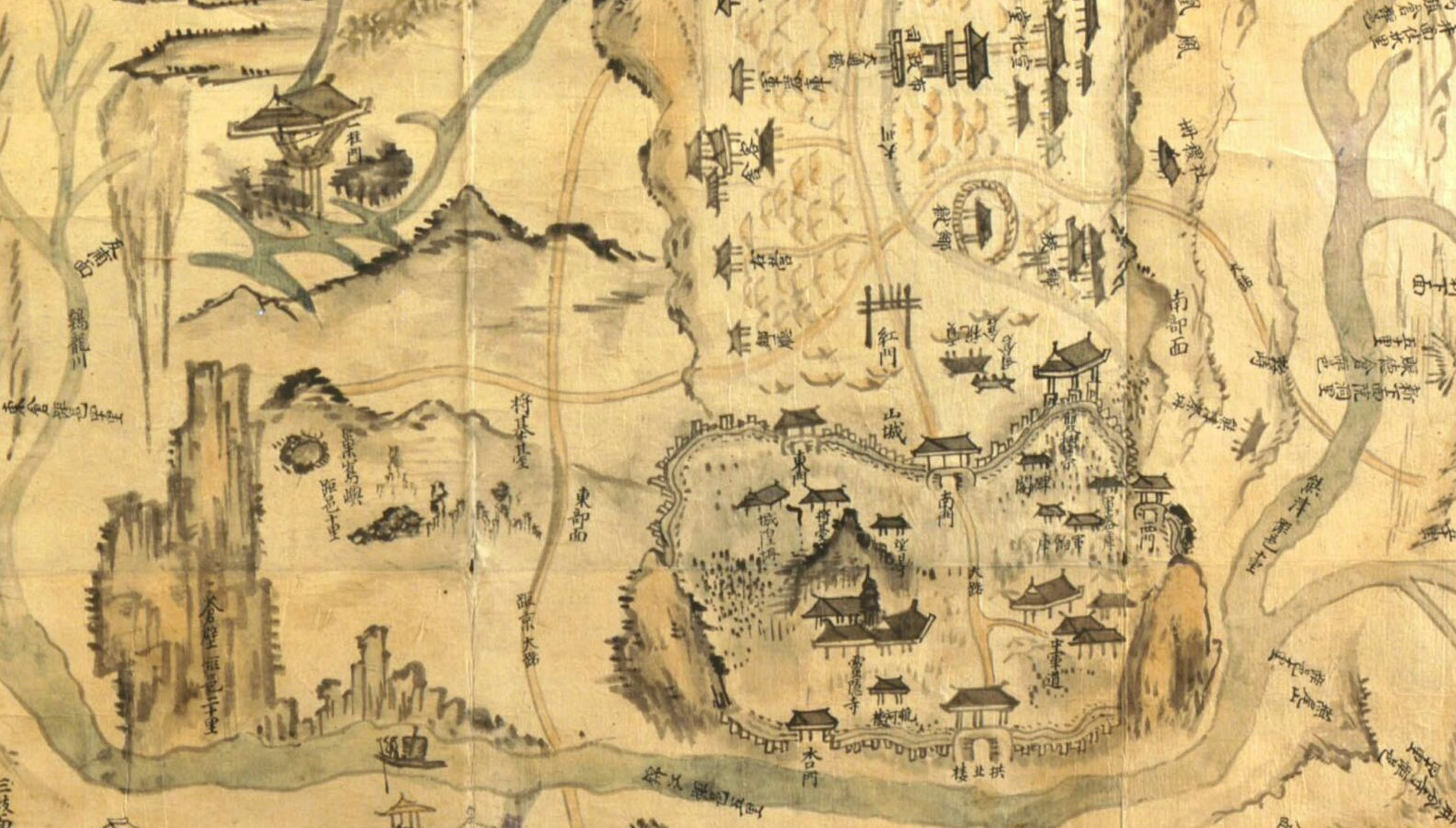
Gongju around 1872

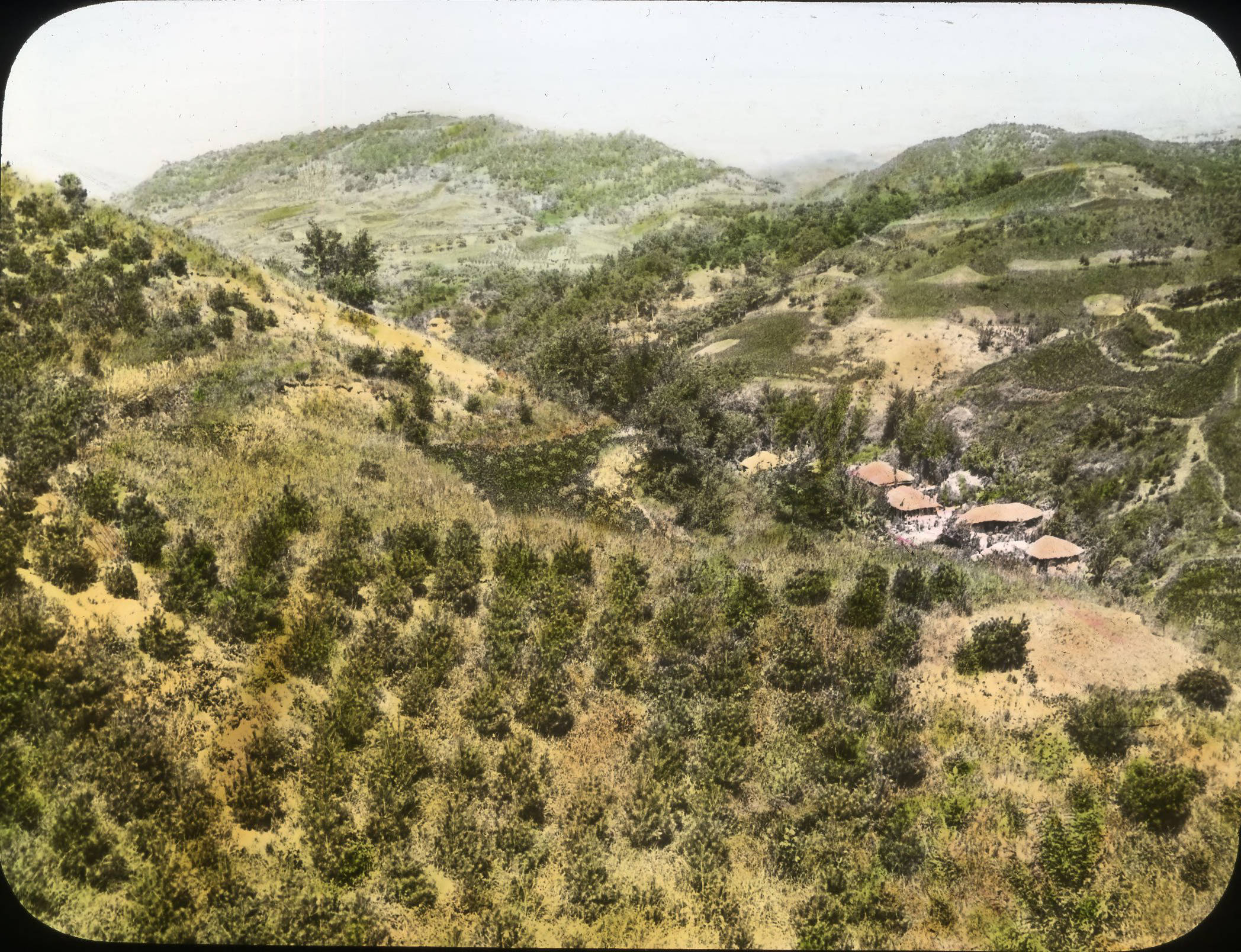
Young trees, Kongju, 1908–1922

Gongju was formerly named Ungjin and was the capital of Baekje from AD 475 to 538. In this period, Baekje was under threat from Goguryeo. Goguryeo had overrun the previous capital of Hanseong (modern-day Seoul), which forced Baekje to find a new center of strength.

In 538, King Seong moved the capital to Sabi (in modern-day Buyeo County). However, Gongju remained an important center until the kingdom's fall in 660.

=== New capital ===
On August 11, 2004, the South Korean Prime Minister Lee Hae-chan announced that the country's capital will be moved from Seoul to Gongju (approximately 120 km or 75 mi south of Seoul) and Yeongi commencing in 2007. A 72.91 km^{2} (18,020 acres) site was chosen for the project, which was scheduled to be completed by 2030. It was envisaged that government and administrative functions will move to the new capital, along with (possibly) the National Assembly and supreme court, although no sizable relocation was expected until the first phase of the project has been completed by 2012.

The move was intended to reduce Seoul's overcrowding and economic dominance over the rest of South Korea; perhaps not coincidentally, it would have also moved the government and administration out of range of North Korean artillery fire.

The projected cost of the project ranged from $45bn to as much as $94bn.

The plan has aroused controversy, with opposition parties calling for a referendum to see whether it is endorsed by the population. Some civic groups have also launched a constitutional appeal, and on October 21, 2004, the Constitutional Court ruled that the special law for the relocation of the capital is unconstitutional since the relocation is a serious national matter requiring national referendum or revision of the constitution, thus effectively ending the dispute. Opinion polls showed that a slight majority of South Koreans are opposed to the move, both before and after the ruling.

However, late in 2004, the government announced yet another plan that will allow Seoul to be a capital in name only by retaining the Executive Branch, all Legislature Branch, and Judiciary Branch in Seoul, while moving all other branches of government to Gongju. The question remains unresolved to date.

== Climate ==
Gongju has a humid continental climate (Köppen: Dwa), but can be considered a borderline humid subtropical climate (Köppen: Cwa), using the −3 °C (27 °F) isotherm. It has a mountainous climate in which temperature is drastically different in the day and at night. Annual average temperature is 10.8 °C, and the highest temperature of the year is 35 °C and the lowest -17 °C. Annual average precipitation is 1,251mm, and Namdae Stream, a branch stream of Geum River, is flowing through Muju-eup.

== Notable people ==
- Chan-ho Park, baseball player
- Taegoon, singer
- Kim Jaejoong, singer
- Chung Un-chan (1947–), former Prime Minister (2009–2010)
- Chung Jin-suk (1960–), former Senior Secretary to the President for Political Affairs (2010–2011), former interim President of the Saenuri Party (2016)

== Foreign sister cities ==
- Qabala, Azerbaijan (20 August 2015)
- Shenyang, China
- Nagomi, Japan
- Yamaguchi, Japan
- Moriyama, Japan
- Baguio, Philippines
- Calhoun County, Alabama
- Berkeley, California (2018)

== See also ==
- List of cities in South Korea
- Geography of South Korea
- Chungcheong
- Sejong City
