= Oh Gi-hyoung =

South Korean politician (born 1966)

- 오기형
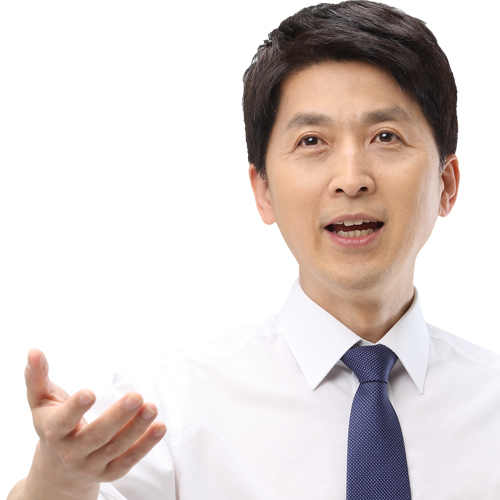

Personal details
- Born: November 25, 1966 (age 59) Hwasun County, South Jeolla Province, South Korea
- Party: Democratic Party of Korea
- Education: Seoul National University
- Occupation: Politician

Oh Gi-hyoung (Korean: 오기형; born 25 November 1966) is a South Korean politician and lawyer. He is a member of the 21st National Assembly.

== Biography ==
From 2000 to 2015, he practiced law at Pacific Law Group.

In 2005, he received his LL.M. degree from UC Berkeley School of Law and was admitted to the New York State Bar in the same year.

In 2006, he expanded his practice to China, where, after completing his studies at Beijing Language and Culture University, he became a senior associate in the firm's Shanghai office, where he worked on investment advisory matters for companies in China

He studied the legal system of the Shenzhen Special Economic Zone in the People's Republic of China, which served as a model for the Kaesong Industrial Zone, and introduced the regulations of the Kaesong Industrial Zone in the United States.

On January 10, 2016, he joined the Democratic Party of Korea as Talent Recruitment No. 5, and was nominated by the Democratic Party of Korea to represent Seoul Dobong B in the 20th National Assembly election in South Korea, but was not elected.

In 2017, he was appointed deputy director of the Democratic Research Center.

In 2018, he was appointed chief of staff to Hong Ihk-pyo, leader of the Democratic Party of Korea in the National Assembly of the Republic of Korea, where he served until the first half of 2019.

In 2016, he was appointed as a local committee member of the Democratic Party of Korea for Dobong, Seoul, and has continued his political activities based in Dobong District.

In July 2019, he was appointed as a member of the Democratic Party of Korea's Special Committee for Countering Japanese Economic Aggression to respond to the economic provocations of Japan's Shinzo Abe administration.

In February 2020, he won first place in the Democratic Party of Korea's intra-party primary for Seoul Dobong B and ran as a candidate for the 21st National Assembly election.

== Election results ==
Year	Elections	Constituency	Political party	Votes (%)	Results
2016	20th National Assembly General Election	Dobong B (Seoul)	Democratic	32,291 (36.40%)	Defeated (2nd)
2020	21st National Assembly General Election	Dobong B (Seoul)	Democratic	51,756 (53.01%)	Won
2024	22nd National Assembly General Election	Dobong B (Seoul)	Democratic	50,384 (52.83%)	Won
