= Korea Vision Party =

2012 political party in South Korea

Korea Vision Party 국민생각
- President: Park Se-il
- Founded: February 27, 2012
- Dissolved: April 12, 2012
- Headquarters: 14-3 Yeoeuido-dong, Yeongdeungpo-gu, Seoul
- Ideology: Reformative conservatism
- Political position: Center-right
- Colors: Orange

- Korea Vision Party
- Hangul: 국민생각
- Hanja: 國民생각
- RR: Gungmin saenggak
- MR: Kungmin saenggak

The Korea Vision Party (Korean: 국민생각, "National Thought"), more commonly known as the K Party, is a center-rightist political party in South Korea. It was founded on 12 February 2012 by Park Se-il, president of the Hansun Foundation, a conservative think tank. There are concerns that the K Party will split the conservative vote, though Park Se-il met with Saenuri leader Park Geun-hye on 23 February, with Park Geun-hye commenting that "If a party holds the same values and orientation, we are open to partnering". The party aims to field over 200 candidates in the April elections, favoring the selection of women and younger politicians. In an opinion poll conducted on 24–25 February 2012, the K Party received a support level of 1.4%, out-ranking the more established New Progressive Party. Analysts have nonetheless raised questions over the ability of the party to secure seats, even if sitting Assembly members do defect.

The party has attempted to court defecting members of the larger Saenuri Party in the run-up to the 2012 Assembly elections, with a particular focus on loyalists of Lee Myung-bak who have been alienated by the rise of Park Geun-hye. Commentators have speculated that pro-Lee lawmakers such as Lee Jae-oh may defect to the K Party en masse, and on March 9, 2012, the former Saenuri Party politician Jeon Yeo-ok defected to the K Party and became its first lawmaker.

== Electoral results ==
Election	Leader	Constituency			Party list			Seats	Position	Status
Election	Leader	Votes	%	Seats	Votes	%	Seats	Seats	Position	Status
2012	Suh Chung-won	44,379	0.21	0 / 246	156,241	0.73	0 / 54	0 / 300	8th	Extra-parliamentary
