= Wonmi District =

District of Bucheon, South Korea

Wonmi
- Non-autonomous District
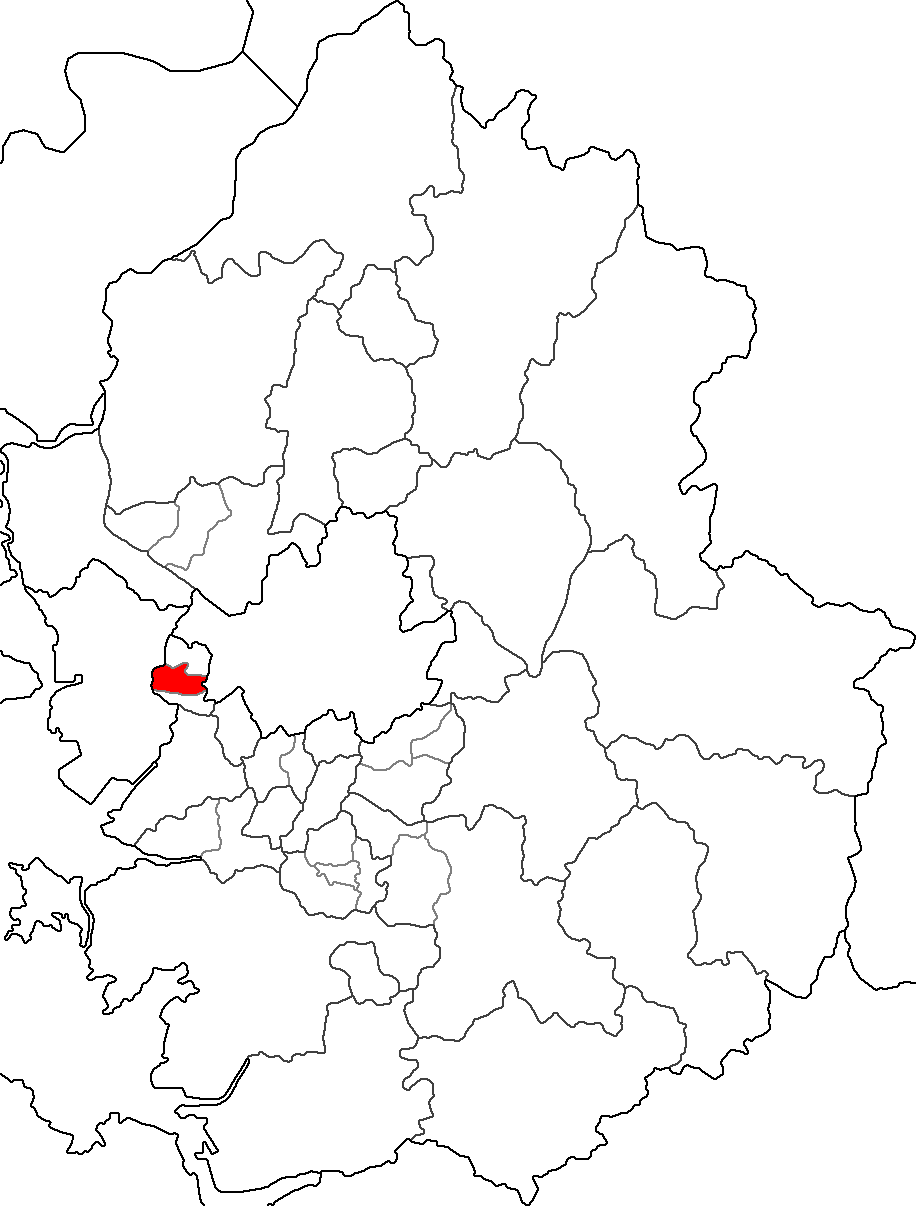
- Map of Gyeonggi Province highlighting Wonmi-gu.
- Country: South Korea
- Region: Sudogwon (Gijeon)
- Province: Gyeonggi
- City: Bucheon

Population
  - Dialect: Seoul
- Website: Wonmi-gu Office

Korean name
- Hangul: 원미구
- Hanja: 遠美區
- RR: Wonmi-gu
- MR: Wŏnmi-gu

Wonmi District (Korean: 원미구) is a district of Bucheon, South Korea. The district was abolished originally in July 2016 as Bucheon became a unified city without any administrative districts. However, years later, it was revived as a district by the Bucheon municipal government on January 1, 2024.

== Administrative divisions ==
Wonmi-gu is divided into the following administrative districts or "Dongs".

- Sosa-dong
- Chunui-dong
- Dodang-dong
- Yakdae-dong
- Simgok 1 to 3 Dong
- Wonmi 1 and 2 Dong
- Yeokgok 1 and 2 Dong
- Jung 1 to 4 Dong
- Sang 1 to 3 Dong

== See also ==
- Bucheon
- Ojeong-gu
- Sosa-gu
