= Jeon Yeo-ok =

South Korean politician (born 1959)

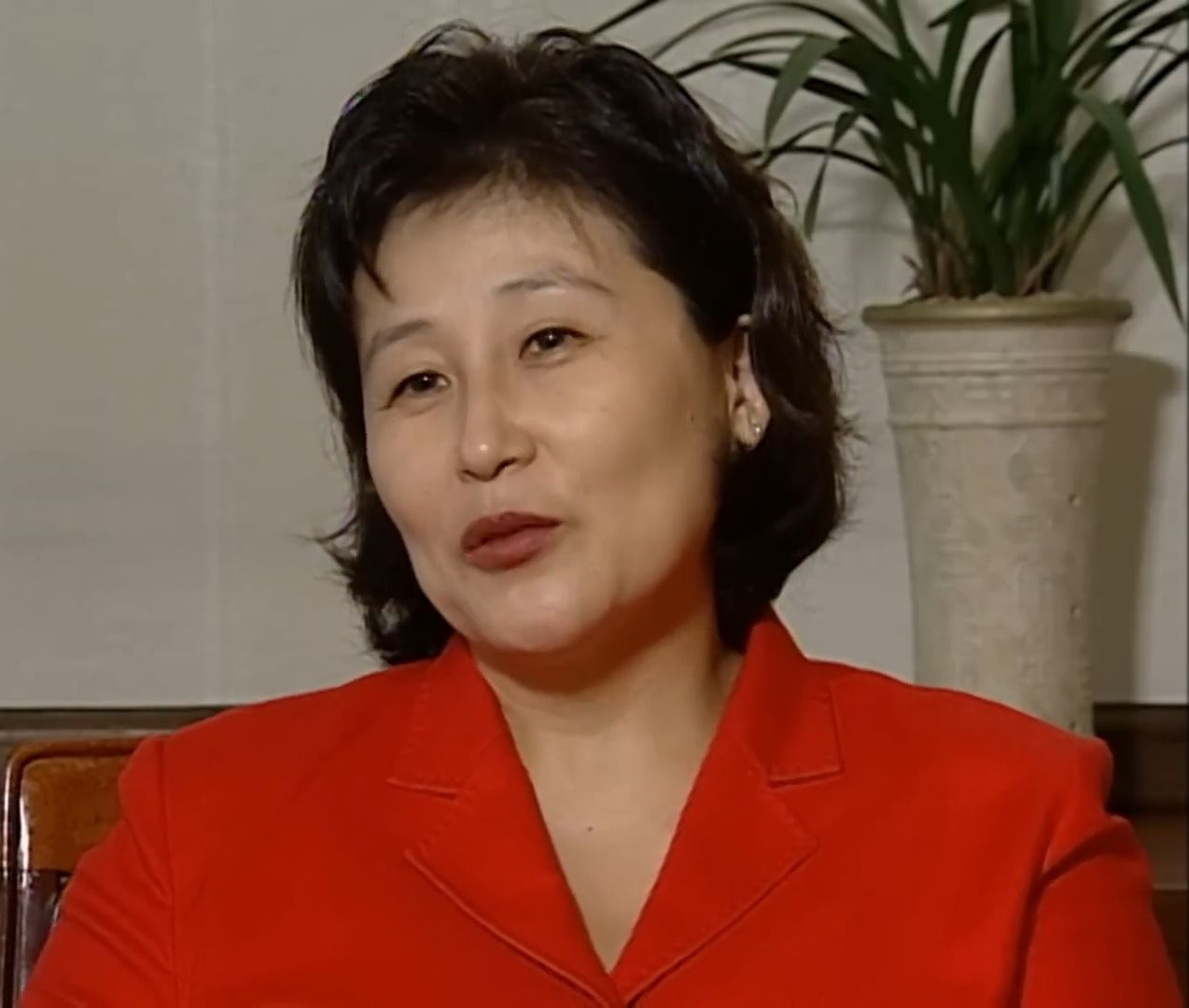

Personal details
- Born: 9 April 1959 (age 67) Seoul; South Korea
- Party: Independent (2012–); Korea Vision Party (2012); Saenuri Party (to 2012)
- Education: Ewha Womans University (B.A. in sociology); Sogang University (M.A. in political science)
- Profession: writer, journalist, broadcaster, politician
- Website: Official Website

- Jeon Yeo-ok
- Hangul: 전여옥
- Hanja: 田麗玉
- RR: Jeon Yeook
- MR: Chŏn Yŏok

Jeon Yeo-ok (Korean: 전여옥; born April 9, 1959) is a conservative female South Korean politician who came from a journalist background. Of a pro-Lee Myung-bak background, she was known for expressing discontent against Park Geun-hye who regained control of the Saenuri Party (formally the Grand National Party). She was not nominated during the party nomination process for the 2012 legislative election as one of the close supporters of Lee Myung-bak. Until then, she was considered as the main rival of Park Geun-hye.

Jeon was accused of academic elitism, as she opposed the nomination of the former president Roh Moo-hyun because he did not graduate from a higher level institution.

== Election results ==
Year	Elections	Constituency	Political party	Votes (%)	Results
2004	17th National Assembly General Election	Proportional representation (7th)	GNP	7,613,660 (35.76%)	Elected
2008	18th National Assembly General Election	Yeongdeungpo A (Seoul)	GNP	35,151 (43.75%)	Won
2012	19th National Assembly General Election	Proportional representation (1st)	KVP	156,222 (0.73%)	Not Elected

== Bibliography ==
- Jeon, Yeo-ok, 일본은 없다, 지식공작소 (November 1, 1993), ISBN 9788986045024
- Jeon, Yeo-ok, 여성이여 테러리스트가 되라, 푸른숲 (November 30, 1995), ISBN 9788971841006
- Jeon, Yeo-ok, 여성이여, 느껴라 탐험하라, 푸른숲 (November 30, 1997), ISBN 9788971841754
- Jeon, Yeo-ok, 간절히@두려움 없이, 푸른숲 (December 31, 1999), ISBN 9788971842614
- Jeon, Yeo-ok, 삿포로에서 맥주를 마시다, 해냄 (July 25, 2003), ISBN 9788973374779
