= Senior Presidential Secretary =

Title in South Korea

Senior Presidential Secretary (Korean: 대통령비서실 수석비서관; Hanja: 大統領秘書室 首席秘書官) is a title used by high-ranking assistants to the President of South Korea. Senior presidential secretaries are senior members of the Presidential Secretariat and wield significant power through their role in policy coordination. These positions can be created by the president without legislation and appointed without the need for confirmation.

Under the Moon Jae-in administration, there are eight senior presidential secretaries, each titled "Senior Presidential Secretary for..." They are overseen by Chief Presidential Secretary and report to the president. Moon Jae-in served as senior presidential secretary for civil affairs in the Roh Moo-hyun administration.

== Role ==
Senior presidential secretaries coordinate the administration's policy and drive forward initiatives of the president. Senior presidential secretaries interact with the president frequently and the power invested in the president means that senior presidential secretaries can rival ministers in influence and importance. For this reason, Yoo Seong-min proposed eliminating them during the 2017 presidential election.

Under the current president, senior presidential secretaries have been encouraged to debate more freely instead of only following directives. Moon Jae-in convenes a meeting of his senior presidential secretaries twice per week.

== See also ==
- Chief Presidential Secretary
- Presidential Secretariat (South Korea)
- President of South Korea
- State Council of South Korea
