= Sosa District =

District of Bucheon, South Korea

Sosa-gu
- Non-autonomous District
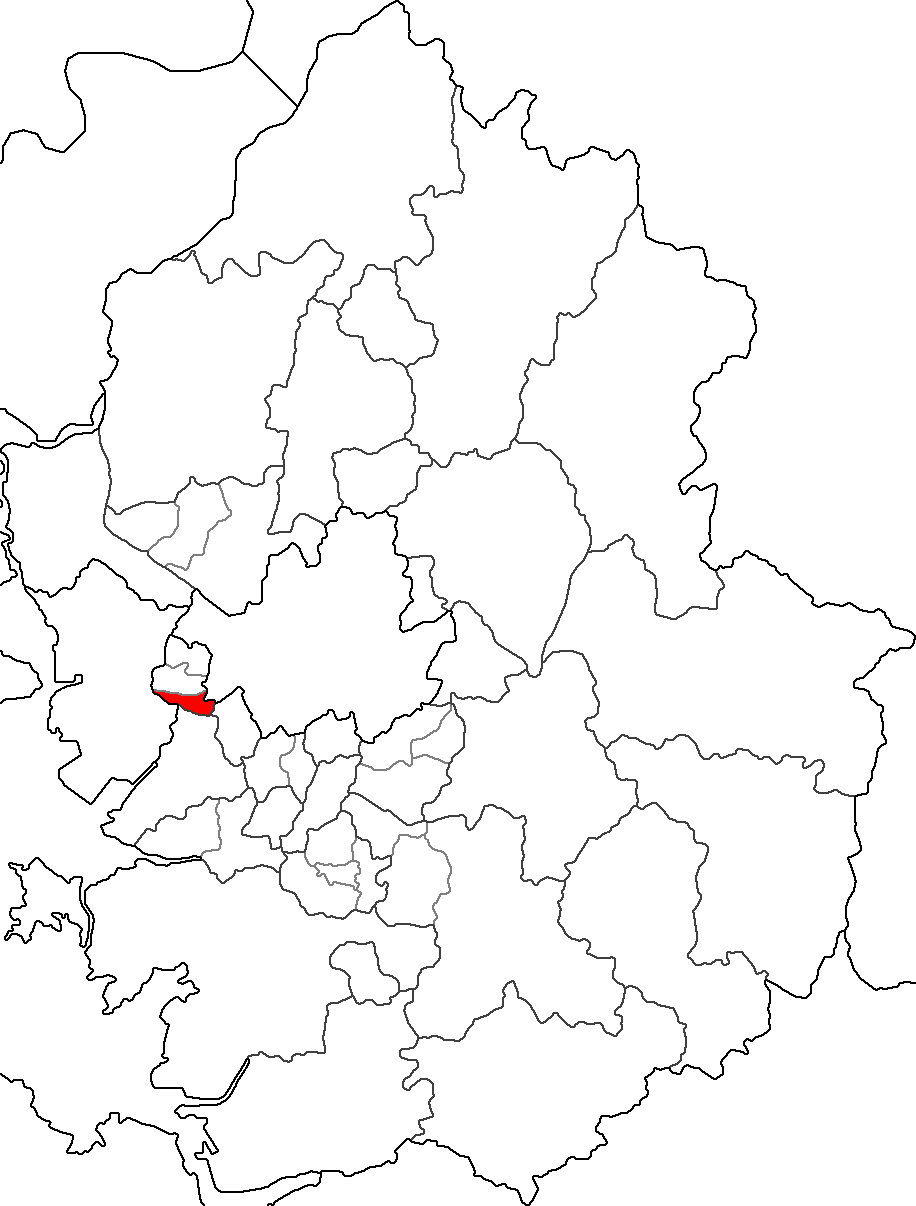
- Map of Gyeonggi-do highlighting Sosa-gu.
- Country: South Korea
- Region: Sudogwon (Gijeon)
- Province: Gyeonggi
- City: Bucheon

Population
  - Dialect: Seoul
- Website: Sosa-gu Office

Korean name
- Hangul: 소사구
- Hanja: 素砂區
- RR: Sosa-gu
- MR: Sosa-gu

Sosa District (Korean: 소사구) is a district of the city of Bucheon in Gyeonggi Province, South Korea. 'So' means 'white' and 'sa' means 'sand'. Many years ago, there were many streams in this region which is why it is named so.

The district was abolished originally in July 2016 as Bucheon became a unified city without any administrative districts. However, years later, it was revived as a district by the Bucheon municipal government on January 1, 2024.

== Administrative divisions ==
Sosa-gu is divided into the following dongs:

- Goean-dong
- Beombak-dong (Divided in turn into Beombak-dong, Gyesu-dong and Okgil-dong)
- Simgokbon-dong
- Simgokbon 1-dong
- Yeokgok 3-dong
- Sosabon 1 to 3 Dong
- Songnae 1 and 2 Dong

== See also ==
- Bucheon
- Ojeong-gu
- Wonmi-gu
