= Chang Jung-sook =

South Korean politician (born 1952)

- 장정숙

Member of the National Assembly
- In office 30 May 2016 – 29 May 2020
- Constituency: Proportional

Floor Leader of the Minsaeng Party
- In office 17 March 2020 – 29 May 2020
- Preceded by: Yu Sung-yup

Personal details
- Born: 17 January 1952 (age 74) Daejeon, South Korea
- Party: Minsaeng Party
- Other political affiliations: Democratic Party (before 2011); Democratic Unionist Party (2011–2013); Democratic Party (2013–2014); New Politics Alliance for Democracy (2014–2015); National Congress (2016); People's Party (2016–2018); Party for Democracy and Peace (de facto; 2018–2019); Bareunmirae (de facto; 2018–2020); New Alternatives (de facto; 2020)
- Spouse: Lim Pyung-yong
- Children: Lim Young-seok; Lim Eun-jung; Lim Hyun-jung
- Education: Seoul National University; Yonsei University
- Occupation: Politician

Chang Jung-sook (Korean: 장정숙, born 17 January 1952) is a South Korean politician and the former parliamentary leader of the New Alternatives.

== Career ==
Born in Daejeon, Chang studied vocal music at Seoul National University. She currently holds a master's degree in music education from Yonsei University.

Chang served as a member of the Seoul Metropolitan Council from 2010 to 2014. During this time, she revealed the corruption scandal of Myung-whun Chung, as well as the poor management of Sejong Centre. Her career gave a nickname "Kwakjwee" (꽉쥐), named after her persistence that when she strongly holds a something, she does not release it (꽉 쥐면 안 놓는다; pronounced as Kwak jweemyun an nohnneunda).

In 2016, she was brought into the National Congress, a minor political party formed by Chun Jung-bae. The party was subsequently merged into the People's Party (PP), in which she ran 11th in the party list. She was elected and served positions i.e. parliamentary spokeswoman and deputy parliamentary leader.

In 2018, Chang declared to quit from the PP along with the other dissidents due to the disagreement of the party's decision to merge with the Bareun Party (BP). She, along with Lee Sang-don and Park Joo-hyun, was planning to join the Party for Democracy and Peace (PDP) but unable to do so as PRs are not allowed to exit from their original parties; if they do so, their parliamentary membership will be automatically revoked. The only way was to let the PP President Ahn Cheol-soo to expel 3 of them, which was rejected by him. Both PP and BP were combined as the Bareunmirae Party (BMP) and since then, she still remains within the party. However, the PDP allowed her to hold any kind of party offices and made her as the PDP spokeswoman.

In 2019, Chang de facto joined the New Alternatives while remaining as a BMP member. In 2020, she was appointed as the parliamentary leader of the New Alternatives.

== Personal life ==
Chang married Lim Pyung-yong, a conductor from Mokpo who met during the university life. Both has a son (Lim Young-seok) and 2 daughters (Lim Eun-jung and Lim Hyun-jung).

== Election results ==
=== General elections ===
Year	Constituency	Political party	Votes (%)	Remarks
2016	Proportional (11th)	People's	6,355,572 (26.74%)	Elected
2020	Proportional (5th)	Minsaeng	758,778 (2.71%)	Not elected

=== Local elections ===
==== Seoul Metropolitan Council ====
Year	Constituency	Political party	Votes (%)	Remarks
2010	Proportional (5th)	DP	1,790,556 (40.99%)	Elected
