= Kim Jung-hwa (politician) =

South Korean politician (born 1979)

- 김정화
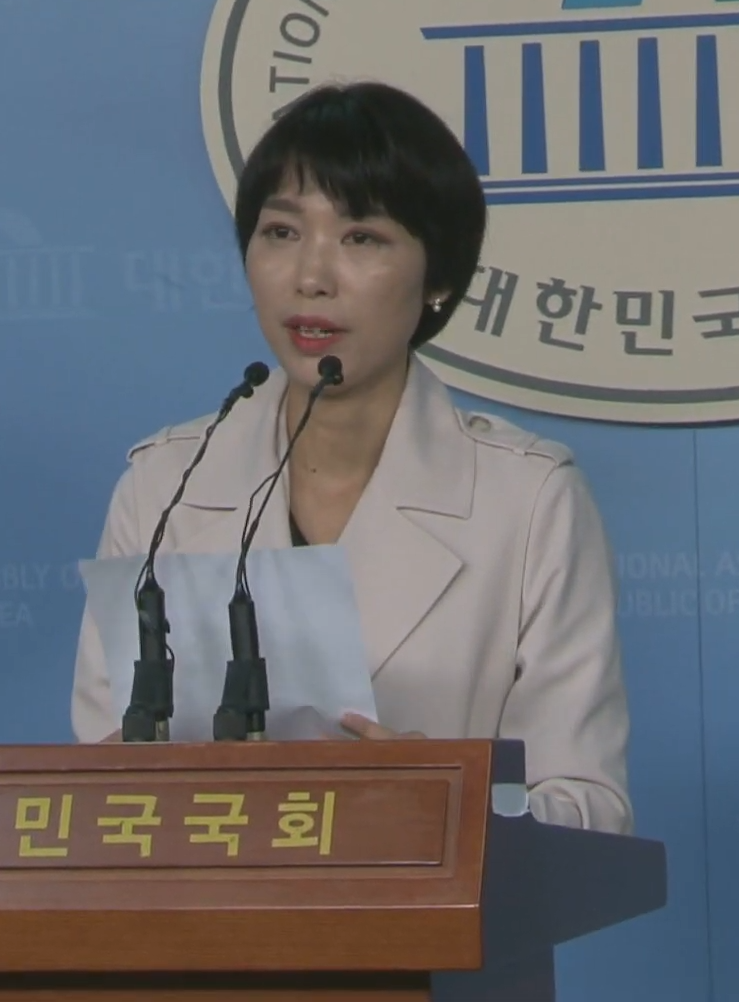
- Kim Jung-hwa is briefing about Cho Kuk scandal.

President of the Minsaeng Party
- In office 24 February 2020 – 28 May 2020 serving with Yu Sung-yup from 24 March 2020 to 20 April 2020 served with Park Joo-hyun until 23 March 2020
- Preceded by: Position established
- Succeeded by: Lee Su-bong (acting)

Personal details
- Born: 19 January 1979 (age 47) Gimje, North Jeolla, South Korea
- Party: Independent
- Other political affiliations: DUP (2012–2013); NPAD (2014–2015); PP (2016–2018); Bareunmirae (2018–2020); Minsaeng (2020–2021)
- Education: Yonsei University; Kookmin University
- Occupation: Politician

Kim Jung-hwa (Korean: 김정화, born 19 January 1979) is a South Korean politician formerly served as a co-President of the Minsaeng Party in 2020.

== Life and career ==
Born in 1979, Kim holds a bachelor's degree in law from Yonsei University, as well as a master's degree in feminist politics of Kookmin University. She entered to politics when she was brought as a female specialist to the Democratic Unionist Party (DUP) in 2012. She quit the party due to her objection towards pro-Moon Jae-in faction of the party. She then became closer to Ahn Cheol-soo, who later formed the New Politics Alliance for Democracy (NPAD) in which she also joined.

In 2016, Kim joined the People's Party formed by Ahn and again the Bareunmirae Party (BMP) in 2018. After Ahn lost at Seoul mayorship election, she soon became closer to Sohn Hak-kyu who later elected as the party President. Under Sohn's leadership, Kim served as the party's spokeswomen. In 2020, though Ahn came back to politics with establishing his new party, People Party, she decided to remain within BMP.

The BMP soon brought a decision to be merged with the New Alternatives (NA) and the Party for Democracy and Peace (PDP) in order to form the Minsaeng Party. Kim was nominated by Sohn as one of the PPL's co-Presidents, along with Yu Sung-yup (NA) and Park Joo-hyun (PDP).

On 19 April 2021, Kim made an announcement to withdraw from the party.

== Election results ==
=== General elections ===
Year	Constituency	Political party	Votes (%)	Remarks
2020	Proportional	Minsaeng	758,778 (2.71%)	Not elected
