= Choi Gyung-hwan =

South Korean politician (born 1959)

- 최경환
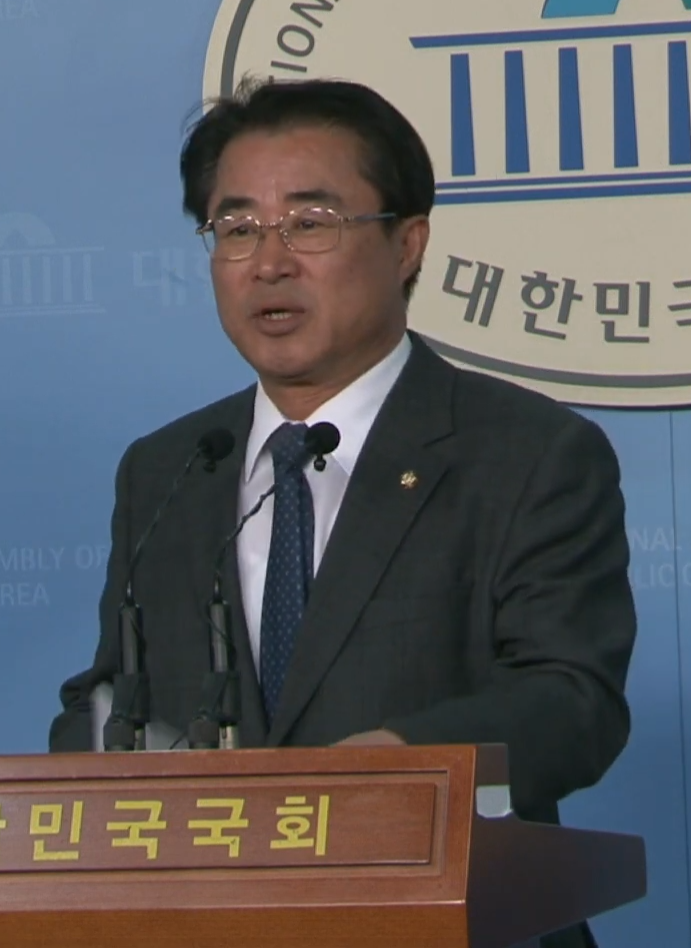

President of the New Alternatives
- In office 12 January 2020 – 24 February 2020
- Preceded by: Position established
- Succeeded by: Party dissolved

Member of the National Assembly
- In office 30 May 2016 – 29 May 2020
- Preceded by: Lim Nae-hyun
- Succeeded by: Lee Hyeong-seok
- Constituency: Gwangju Buk B

Personal details
- Born: 28 July 1959 (age 67) Jangseong, South Jeolla, South Korea
- Party: Democratic Party
- Other political affiliations: National Congress for New Politics (1996–1999); Independent (1999–2003); Millennium Democratic Party (2003–2004); Independent (2004–2012); Democratic Unionist Party (2012–2013); Democratic Party (2013–2014); New Politics Alliance for Democracy (2014–2015); Independent (2015–2016); People's Party (2016–2018); Party for Democracy and Peace (2018–2019); New Alternatives (2020); Minsaeng (2020–2021)
- Education: Sungkyunkwan University
- Occupation: Activist, politician

Choi Gyung-hwan (Korean: 최경환; born 28 July 1959) is a South Korean activist and politician. He is the member of the National Assembly for Gwangju Buk B constituency since 2016 and the president of the New Alternatives since 2020. Prior to these careers, he was the presidential secretary and the last aide for the former-president of the Republic Kim Dae-jung.

== Career ==
During the 1980s, Choi was once jailed for being involved in Hakrim incident and Youth Union for Pro-democracy Movement (aka Minchŏngryŏn) incident, in which the former was acquitted in 2015. He later served as the Presidential Secretary for Kim Dae-jung, as well as his aide. He is widely known as his last aide by serving the position till the death of the ex-President in 2009. Following the death of Kim, Choi has been working at Kim Dae-jung Peace Centre.

Choi was brought into the Democratic Unionist Party and launched his bid for Gwangju North 2nd constituency in 2012, but lost to Lim Nae-hyun during the preselection. In 2016, he joined the People's Party (PP) and was elected as the MP. He proposed a bill named Special Act on the Investigation of Facts that later passed the parliamentary votes.

Choi once helped the party's ex-President Ahn Cheol-soo, but due to the disagreement of Ahn's decision to merge with the Bareun Party, he quit and joined the Party for Democracy and Peace (PDP) in 2018. In August, he launched his bid for the party's presidency but came behind of Chung Dong-young and Yu Sung-yup, made him as one of the Vice Presidents.

In 2019, Choi and the party's dissidents left PDP and formed the New Alternatives. On 12 January 2020, he was elected as the newly-formed party's president.

== Trivia ==
Choi Gyung-hwan has the same name with the former Deputy Prime Minister Choi Kyoung-hwan, though both are not related. Nevertheless, the name brought confusions, especially after the latter was involved in controversies. As an example, on 9 December 2016, when the former Deputy Prime Minister Choi was the only MP who abstained from the impeachment vote against the President Park Geun-hye, the former Presidential Secretary Choi was the one who received many protest messages.

== Books ==
- The Leadership of Kim Dae-jung (15 December 2010)

== Election results ==
Year	Elections	Constituency	Political party	Votes (%)	Remarks
2016	20th National Assembly General Election	Buk B (Gwangju)	People's	68,641 (55.29%)	Won
2020	21st National Assembly General Election	Buk B (Gwangju)	Minsaeng	15,281 (11.12%)	Defeated (2nd)
