= Centrism in South Korea =

Centrism in South Korea refers to politicians, parties and movements that position themselves between the country's two dominant blocs, the liberal Democratic Party and the conservative People Power Party. Such politics are commonly described in Korean as the "third zone" (제3지대; je-sam-jidae).

Centrist vehicles have appeared repeatedly but proved short-lived, dissolving or merging within a few electoral cycles. Ahn Cheol-soo has attempted to establish a centrist party on several occasions since 2012. In 2016 he co-founded the People Party, launched on a platform of moderate reform. Following the Impeachment of Park Geun-hye, that party merged with the moderate conservative Bareun Party to form the Bareunmirae Party in 2018.

Realignment continued ahead of the 2020 South Korean legislative election, when Bareunmirae combined with the Party for Democracy and Peace and the New Alternative Party to form the Minsaeng Party, since renamed the Party for Democracy and Peace (2025). Ahn founded a second People Party the same year. A further wave of third-zone parties contested the 2024 general election, among them New Choice, Hope of Korea, the New Future Democratic Party and the initially centrist Reform Party.

== History ==
The first party to put centrism (Jungdogaehyeok) as its main ideology was Peace Democratic Party, a liberal party founded by Kim Dae-jung in 1987. However, when the National Congress for New Politics was founded in 1995, it emphasized "moderate conservatives" (Korean: 온건 보수; Hanja: 穩健保守) more than Jungdogaehyeok to gain more support from conservatives. The term Jungdogaehyeok was used less frequently post the presidency of Roh Moo-hyun until it was revived in 2016 as part of the first People Party founding.

In 2023-2024 a group of "third zone" parties were formed including Hope of Korea, New Choice, New Reform (initially centrist) and New Future. Ahead of the 2024 South Korean legislative election the parties agreed to merge, Hope of Korea merged into New Reform on 24 January 2024 and New Choice and a group of independent lawmakers called Principles and Common Sense also merged into New Reform. New Future initially agreed to join the merger with New Choice and Principles and Common Sense but due to disagreements withdrew 11 days later.

== See also ==
- Conservatism in South Korea
- Liberalism in South Korea
