= Opinion polling for the 2020 South Korean legislative election =

In the run up to the 2020 South Korean legislative election, various organisations carried out opinion polling to gauge voting intention in South Korea. Results of such polls are displayed in this article.

== Opinion polls ==
=== Campaign period ===
==== Constituency votes ====
| Polling firm | Fieldwork date | Sample size | Resp. | DP | UFP | MP | JP | ORP | MP | PNP | KEP | Others | Lead |
|---|---|---|---|---|---|---|---|---|---|---|---|---|---|
| Gallup | 7 - 8 Apr 2020 | 1,000 | – | 44 | 23 | 0.7 | 6 | 0.7 | 0.6 | 0.3 | - | 1 | 21 |
| Realmeter | 6 - 8 Apr 2020 | 1,509 | – | 42.6 | 30.2 | 2.6 | 4.9 | 1.1 | 1.6 | 2.0 | 1.7 | 1.5 | 12.4 |
| Realmeter | 30 Mar - 3 Apr 2020 | 2,521 | – | 43.2 | 28.8 | 2.2 | 5.4 | 1.4 | 1.4 | 1.7 | 1.3 | 1.6 | 14.4 |
| Gallup | 31 Mar - 2 Apr 2020 | 1,002 | – | 41 | 23 | 0.1 | 4 | 0.5 | 0.3 | 0.3 | - | 1 | 18 |
| C&I | 28-30 Mar 2020 | 1,000 | – | 44.7 | 33.3 | 1.3 | 4.5 | 1.6 | 2 | 1.9 | - | 3.7 | 11.4 |
| Research&Research | 28-29 Mar 2020 | 1,001 | – | 38 | 25.3 | 0.9 | 3.4 | 2 | 1 | - | - | 4.2 | 12.7 |

==== Proportional votes ====
| Polling firm | Fieldwork date | Sample size | Resp. | PlP | FKP | MP | JP | ORP | MP | PP | PNP | ODP | KEP | Others | Lead |
|---|---|---|---|---|---|---|---|---|---|---|---|---|---|---|---|
| Gallup | 7 - 8 Apr 2020 | 1,000 | – | 23 | 22 | 2.6 | 13 | 1 | - | 6 | - | 8 | - | 2 | 1 |
| Realmeter | 6 - 8 Apr 2020 | 1,509 | – | 24.2 | 27.8 | 3 | 8.1 | 1 | 1.4 | 5.3 | 2.4 | 12.3 | 1.7 | 2.7 | 3.6 |
| Ipsos | 4 - 6 Apr 2020 | 1,004 | – | 23.2 | 24.2 | 1.2 | 12.5 | 1.5 | - | 7.4 | - | 8.6 | - | - | 1 |
| Realmeter | 30 Mar - 3 Apr 2020 | 2,521 | – | 21.7 | 25.0 | 2.8 | 8.5 | 1.9 | 1.6 | 4.7 | 2.1 | 14.4 | 1.6 | 3.2 | 3.3 |
| Gallup | 31 Mar - 2 Apr 2020 | 1,002 | – | 21 | 23 | 2 | 11 | 1 | - | 5 | - | 10 | - | 2 | 2 |
| Realmeter | 30 Mar - 1 Apr 2020 | 1,514 | – | 20.8 | 25.1 | 2.9 | 8.2 | 2 | 1.2 | 5.1 | 1.8 | 14.3 | 2.0 | 3.2 | 4.3 |
| C&I | 28-30 Mar 2020 | 1,000 | – | 22.5 | 31.9 | 2.4 | 7.7 | 2.2 | 1.8 | 5.3 | 1.6 | 15.5 | - | 3.4 | 9.4 |
| Research&Research | 28-29 Mar 2020 | 1,001 | – | 16.5 | 21.8 | 0.9 | 8.5 | 1.3 | - | 3.4 | - | 9 | - | 1.1 | 5.3 |
| Realmeter | 23-27 Mar 2020 | 2,531 | – | 29.8 | 27.4 | 2.2 | 5.9 | 2 | 1.2 | 4.3 | 2.3 | 11.7 | - | 2.5 | 2.4 |

=== Pre-campaign period ===
==== 2020 ====
| Date(s) Conducted | Polling firm | DP | UFP | MP | JP | ORP | MP | PP | PNP | ODP | Others | Undecided | Lead |
|---|---|---|---|---|---|---|---|---|---|---|---|---|---|
| 24-26 March | Gallup Korea | 37 | 22 | 0 | 5 | 1 | —N/a | 4 | —N/a | 2 | 2 | 27 | 15 |
| 23-27 March | Realmeter | 44.6 | 30.0 | 1.8 | 4.6 | 1.8 | 1.0 | 3.3 | 1.6 | —N/a | 2.8 | 8.4 | 14.6 |

| Date(s) Conducted | Polling firm | DP | UFP | MP | JP | LRP | MP | PP | PNP | ODP | Others | Undecided | Lead |
|---|---|---|---|---|---|---|---|---|---|---|---|---|---|
| 17-19 March | Gallup Korea | 38 | 23 | 1 | 4 | 1 | —N/a | 4 | —N/a | 1 | 1 | 28 | 15 |
| 16-20 March | Realmeter | 42.1 | 33.6 | 1.4 | 3.7 | 1.4 | 1.3 | 4.0 | 2.1 | —N/a | 1.9 | 8.6 | 8.5 |
| 10-12 March | Gallup Korea | 39 | 22 | 0 | 6 | 1 | —N/a | 3 | —N/a | —N/a | 1 | 28 | 17 |
| 9-13 March | Realmeter | 41.5 | 32.1 | 2.1 | 4.3 | 2.4 | 1.2 | 3.9 | —N/a | —N/a | 1.6 | 10.9 | 9.4 |

| Date(s) Conducted | Polling firm | DP | UFP | MP | JP | ORP | MP | PP | Others | Undecided | Lead |
|---|---|---|---|---|---|---|---|---|---|---|---|
| 3-5 March | Gallup Korea | 36 | 22 | 1 | 6 | —N/a | —N/a | 2 | 2 | 31 | 14 |
| 2-6 March | Realmeter | 41.7 | 31.2 | 4.1 | 4.9 | 1.6 | 0.8 | 4.7 | 1.3 | 9.7 | 10.5 |
| 25-27 February | Gallup Korea | 37 | 21 | 1 | 6 | —N/a | —N/a | 2 | 1 | 33 | 16 |
| 25-28 February | Realmeter | 41.0 | 31.0 | 4.1 | 4.3 | 1.6 | 1.0 | 1.7 | 1.7 | 13.6 | 10.0 |

| Date(s) Conducted | Polling firm | DP | UFP | Bareunmirae | NA | JP | PDP | ORP | MP | PP | Others | Undecided | Lead |
|---|---|---|---|---|---|---|---|---|---|---|---|---|---|
| 18-20 February | Gallup Korea | 36 | 23 | 4 | —N/a | 7 | —N/a | —N/a | —N/a | 2 | 1 | 27 | 13 |
| 17-21 February | Realmeter | 40.5 | 33.7 | 3.0 | 1.3 | 4.1 | 2.2 | 1.5 | 1.0 | 2.3 | 0.9 | 9.5 | 6.8 |

| Date(s) Conducted | Polling firm | DP | LKP | Bareunmirae | NCP | NA | JP | PDP | ORP | MP | Others | Undecided | Lead |
|---|---|---|---|---|---|---|---|---|---|---|---|---|---|
| 11-13 February | Gallup Korea | 37 | 21 | 3 | 3 | 5 | —N/a | —N/a | —N/a | 4 | 1 | 27 | 16 |
| 10-14 February | Realmeter | 39.9 | 32.0 | 2.6 | 3.9 | 0.9 | 4.8 | 1.5 | 1.2 | 1.3 | 0.8 | 11.1 | 7.9 |

==== 2019 ====
| Date(s) Conducted | Polling firm | Democratic | Liberty Korea | Bareunmirae | Democracy and Peace | Justice | Others | Lead |
|---|---|---|---|---|---|---|---|---|
| 19–21 March | Gallup Korea | 37 | 21 | 7 | 1 | 9 | 1 | 16 |
| 18–20 March | Realmeter | 39.9 | 31.9 | 4.9 | 2.3 | 7.3 | 1.5 | 8.0 |
| 11–15 March | Realmeter | 36.6 | 31.7 | 5.9 | 2.1 | 6.9 | 1.7 | 4.9 |
| 12–14 March | Gallup Korea | 39 | 22 | 7 | 1 | 7 | 1 | 17 |
| 4–8 March | Realmeter | 37.2 | 30.4 | 6.2 | 2.1 | 7 | 1.6 | 6.8 |
| 5–7 March | Gallup Korea | 39 | 20 | 7 | 1 | 8 | 0 | 19 |
| 26–28 February | Gallup Korea | 38 | 20 | 7 | 1 | 8 | 0 | 18 |
| 25–28 February | Realmeter | 38.3 | 28.8 | 7.3 | 2.7 | 6.9 | 1.8 | 9.5 |
| 19–21 February | Gallup Korea | 40 | 19 | 6 | 1 | 9 | 1 | 21 |
| 18–22 February | Realmeter | 40.4 | 26.8 | 6.6 | 3.2 | 7.1 | 1.5 | 13.6 |
| 12–14 February | Gallup Korea | 40 | 19 | 8 | 1 | 8 | 1 | 21 |
| 11–15 February | Realmeter | 40.3 | 25.2 | 6 | 2.8 | 7 | 1.6 | 15.1 |
| 7–8 February | Realmeter | 38.9 | 28.9 | 6.8 | 2.9 | 6.2 | 1.9 | 10 |
| 29–31 January | Gallup Korea | 39 | 21 | 6 | 1 | 9 | 0 | 18 |
| 28 January – 1 February | Realmeter | 38.2 | 27.4 | 6.3 | 2.5 | 7.2 | 2.3 | 10.8 |
| 21–25 January | Realmeter | 38.7 | 26.7 | 5.5 | 3.1 | 8.1 | 2 | 12 |
| 15–17 January | Gallup Korea | 40 | 16 | 8 | 1 | 8 | 0 | 24 |
| 14–18 January | Realmeter | 39.8 | 24.3 | 6.3 | 2.7 | 7.5 | 2 | 15.5 |
| 8–10 January | Gallup Korea | 40 | 16 | 7 | 1 | 9 | 0 | 24 |
| 7–11 January | Realmeter | 40.1 | 23.9 | 6.4 | 2.2 | 9.1 | 2.2 | 16.2 |

==== 2018 ====
| Date(s) Conducted | Polling firm | Democratic | Liberty Korea | Bareunmirae | Democracy and Peace | Justice | Others | Lead |
|---|---|---|---|---|---|---|---|---|
| 15–17 October | Realmeter | 42.3 | 20 | 6.6 | 3.1 | 9.8 | 2.2 | 22.3 |
| 2–4 October | Gallup Korea | 48 | 11 | 7 | 1 | 9 | 1 | 37 |
| 28–30 September | ResearchView | 48 | 18 | 7 | 2 | 8 | 2 | 30 |
| 23 September | R&Search | 42.5 | 17.7 | 7.1 | 3 | 9.1 | 2.8 | 24.8 |
| 11–13 September | Gallup Korea | 40 | 11 | 8 | 0.5 | 12 | 0 | 28 |
| 3–4 September | Research&Research | 41.3 | 12.6 | 7 | 0.5 | 10 | 2.4 | 28.7 |
| 27–31 August | Realmeter | 41.4 | 18.8 | 6.6 | 2.8 | 11.8 | 2.1 | 22.6 |
| 21–23 August | Gallup Korea | 42 | 11 | 5 | 1 | 15 | 1 | 27 |
| 13–17 August | Realmeter | 39.6 | 19.9 | 7.3 | 2.4 | 13.3 | 1.7 | 19.7 |
| 4–5 August | ResearchView | 41.9 | 15.8 | 6.6 | 1.2 | 17 | 2.4 | 24.9 |
| 31 July – 2 August | Gallup Korea | 41 | 11 | 5 | 1 | 15 | 0 | 26 |
| 23–27 July | Realmeter | 44 | 18.6 | 7 | 2.9 | 12.5 | 1.6 | 25.4 |
| 10–12 July | Gallup Korea | 49 | 10 | 6 | 0.3 | 10 | 0 | 39 |
| 9–11 July | Realmeter | 44.3 | 16.8 | 6.3 | 2.8 | 12.4 | 2.6 | 27.5 |
| 2–6 July | Realmeter | 47.5 | 18.3 | 5.8 | 2.9 | 10.4 | 2.6 | 29.2 |
| 30 June – 1 July | ResearchView | 48 | 20 | 5 | 4 | 12 | 4 | 28 |
| 26–28 June | Gallup Korea | 52 | 10 | 5 | 1 | 9 | 1 | 42 |
| 25–27 June | Realmeter | 47.8 | 18.3 | 5.3 | 2.3 | 10.1 | 2.6 | 29.5 |
| 18–20 June | Realmeter | 53.6 | 17.4 | 5.2 | 2.7 | 7.9 | 1.9 | 36.2 |
| 13 June | 2018 local elections | | | | | | | |
| 28 May – 1 June | Realmeter | 52.2 | 19.8 | 5.6 | 2.9 | 6.3 | 1.9 | 32.4 |
| 23–24 May | Gallup Korea | 53 | 13 | 5 | 1 | 4 | 0 | 40 |
| 14–18 May | Realmeter | 54.2 | 18.7 | 5.7 | 3.4 | 5.8 | 1.5 | 35.5 |
| 5–6 May | ResearchView | 55 | 20 | 7 | 2 | 6 | 2 | 35 |
| 28–29 April | KSOI | 58.8 | 11 | 6.8 | 0.6 | 4.2 | 2 | 47.8 |
| 9–13 April | Realmeter | 50.4 | 21.9 | 5.7 | 3.3 | 4.2 | 1.9 | 28.5 |
| 26–30 March | Realmeter | 51.3 | 20.7 | 6.8 | 2.4 | 5.2 | 2.2 | 30.6 |
| 20–22 March | Gallup Korea | 47 | 14 | 6 | 1 | 5 | 0 | 33 |
| 26 February – 2 March | Realmeter | 50 | 19.7 | 6.8 | 3 | 4.5 | 2.6 | 30.3 |
| 20–22 February | Gallup Korea | 48 | 11 | 8 | 1 | 6 | 1 | 37 |
| 11–14 February | Kantar Public | 47.9 | 14.9 | 8.1 | 1.6 | 5.6 | 1.3 | 33 |
| 5–9 February | Realmeter | 44.4 | 19.1 | 11 | 4.2 | 7 | 2.1 | 25.3 |

==== 2016 to 2017 ====
| Date(s) Conducted | Polling firm | Democratic | Liberty Korea | People | Bareun | Justice | Others | Lead |
|---|---|---|---|---|---|---|---|---|
| 18–22 December | Realmeter | 52.0 | 17.8 | 4.9 | 5.7 | 5.2 | 1.6 | 34.2 |
| 5–7 December | Gallup Korea | 46 | 11 | 5 | 8 | 5 | 0 | 35 |
| 18–19 November | Research & Research | 49.0 | 11.8 | 5.5 | 6.3 | 5.4 | 0.8 | 37.2 |
| 30 October – 1 November | Realmeter | 50.9 | 17.5 | 6.6 | 4.4 | 5.7 | 2.3 | 33.4 |
| 13–14 October | KSOI | 49.7 | 12.2 | 6.9 | 5.2 | 5.6 | 1.7 | 37.5 |
| 18–20 September | Realmeter | 49.8 | 17.0 | 6.0 | 6.3 | 4.7 | 2.8 | 32.8 |
| 28–30 August | Realmeter | 52.2 | 16.8 | 6.2 | 6.5 | 6.0 | 1.7 | 35.4 |
| 4–6 July | Gallup Korea | 50 | 14 | 4 | 8 | 6 | 0 | 36 |
| 10–12 May | Realmeter | 44.7 | 13.0 | 8.8 | 8.3 | 9.6 | 1.3 | 31.7 |
| 9 May | 2017 presidential election | | | | | | | |
| 26 April | Research & Research | 38.8 | 12.9 | 20.3 | 5.7 | 6.3 | 0.3 | 18.5 |
| 11–13 April | Gallup Korea | 41 | 9 | 24 | 4 | 4 | 0 | 17 |
| 14 March | Hankook Research | 39.4 | 10.5 | 9.3 | 4.8 | 5.2 | 2.9 | 28.9 |
| 10 March | Impeachment of Park Geun-hye | | | | | | | |
| 1–2 February | Realmeter | 36.4 | 11.6 | 12.1 | 7.9 | 4.8 | 2.7 | 24.8 |
| 28–30 January | JoWon C&I | 36.9 | 12.3 | 11.9 | 8.8 | 5.0 | 3.0 | 24.6 |
| 10–12 January | Gallup Korea | 41 | 12 | 10 | 7 | 3 | 0 | 29 |
2016
| 2 November | 2016 South Korean political scandal begins | | | | | | | |
| 24–26 October | Realmeter | 30.5 | 26.5 | 14.4 | – | 4.5 | 3.9 | 4.0 |
| 26–30 September | Realmeter | 28.8 | 33.0 | 13.9 | – | 4.5 | 3.6 | 4.2 |
| 27–28 August | ResearchView | 30.6 | 27.6 | 14.3 | – | 7.4 | 0.7 | 3.0 |
| 31 July – 1 August | R&Search | 23.0 | 33.5 | 11.8 | – | 5.6 | – | 10.5 |
| 28–30 June | Gallup Korea | 23 | 30 | 14 | – | 6 | 0 | 7 |
| 30 May – 1 June | Realmeter | 29.8 | 30.1 | 17.7 | – | 7.6 | 2.9 | 0.3 |
| 19–21 Apr | Gallup Korea | 24 | 30 | 25 | – | 7 | 0 | 5 |
| 13 April 2016 | 2016 elections (PR) | 25.5 | 33.5 | 26.7 | - | 7.2 | 6.9 | 8.0 |

General notes

- Gallup Korea provides poll results only to the nearest whole number.
