= Park Joo-hyun (politician) =

South Korean politician (born 1963)

- 박주현
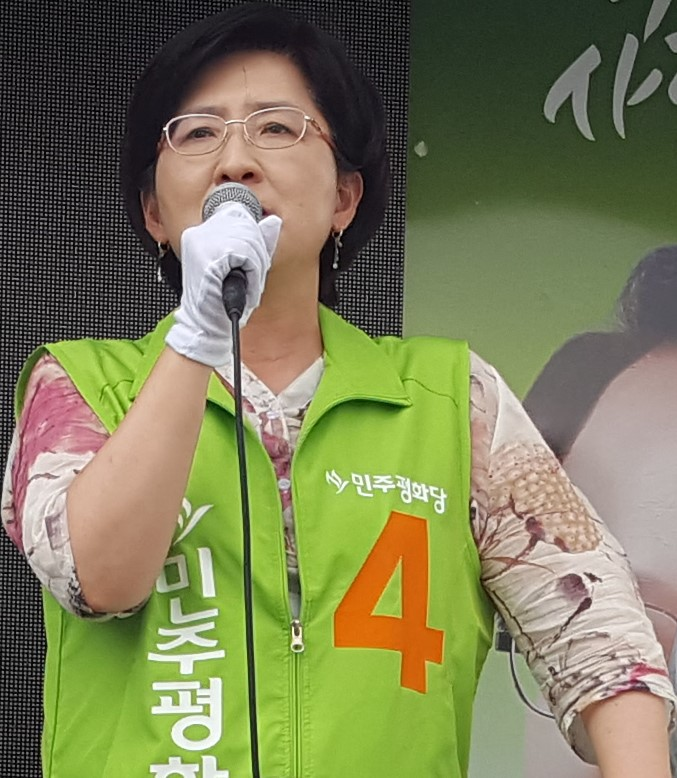
- Park Joo-hyun in 2018

President of the Minsaeng Party
- In office 24 February 2020 – 23 March 2020; Serving with Yu Sung-yup
- Preceded by: Position established
- Succeeded by: Kim Jung-hwa; Yu Sung-yup

Member of the National Assembly
- In office 30 May 2016 – 29 May 2020
- Constituency: Proportional

Senior Secretary to the President for National Participation
- In office 25 February 2003 – 21 December 2003
- President: Roh Moo-hyun
- Preceded by: Position established
- Succeeded by: Position abolished

Personal details
- Born: 11 April 1963 (age 63) Gunsan, North Jeolla, South Korea
- Party: Minsaeng
- Other political affiliations: People's (2016–2018); Bareunmirae (de jure; 2018–2020); Democracy and Peace (de facto; 2018–2020)
- Spouse: Hong Ki-tae
- Children: 1 son and 1 daughter
- Education: Seoul National University; University of Tampere
- Occupation: Lawyer, politician

Park Joo-hyun (Korean: 박주현; born 11 April 1963) is a South Korean lawyer and politician. She is the incumbent Member of the National Assembly since 2016 and was also one of the co-Presidents of the Minsaeng Party in 2020, serving with Yu Sung-yup.

== Career ==
Born in Gunsan, Park attended to Jeonju Girls' High School. She owns a bachelor's and master's degree in law from Seoul National University. She also studied education at University of Tampere in Finland.

After qualifying for the bar in 1985, Park worked at the Lawyers for a Democratic Society. In 2003, the President Roh Moo-hyun appointed her as the Senior Secretary to the President for National Participation and served for almost a year.

Prior to the 2016 election, Park was brought into the People's Party and ran 3rd in the party list. In 2018, she declared to quit from the PP along with the other dissidents due to the disagreement of the party's decision to merge with the Bareun Party (BP) (both were later merged into the Bareunmirae Party). She, along with Lee Sang-don and Chang Jung-sook, was planning to join the Party for Democracy and Peace (PDP) but unable to do so as PRs are not allowed to exit from their original parties; if they do so, their parliamentary membership will be automatically revoked. Though the law did not allow her to exit, however, the PDP allowed her to hold party positions with holding Bareunmirae membership. She was shortly considered as the potential candidate for the Governor of North Jeolla that can overcome the matter.

On 9 January 2020, Park declared to not seek re-election in the 2020 election. On 24 February, Park was elected as the co-Presidents of the Minsaeng Party along with Yu Sung-yup.

Park married to Hong Ki-tae and has a son and a daughter. She is a Protestant.

== Election results ==
=== General elections ===
Year	Constituency	Political party	Votes (%)	Remarks
2016	PR (3rd)	PP	6,355,572 (26.74%)	Elected
