= Kim Jong-hoe =

South Korean politician (born 1965)

- 김종회

Secretary-General of the New Alternatives
- Incumbent
- Assumed office 12 January 2020
- Preceded by: Position established

Member of the National Assembly
- Incumbent
- Assumed office 30 May 2016
- Preceded by: Choi Kyu-sung (as Gimje-Wanju); Kim Choon-jin (as Gochang-Buan)
- Constituency: Gimje-Buan

Personal details
- Born: 24 August 1965 (age 61) Gimje, North Jeolla, South Korea
- Party: New Alternatives
- Other political affiliations: New Politics Alliance for Democracy (2015); People's Party (2016–2018); Party for Democracy and Peace (2018–2019)
- Spouse: Kim Joo-ran
- Parent: Kim Su-yeon (father)
- Education: Wonkwang University
- Occupation: Educator, politician

Kim Jong-hoe (Korean: 김종회, born 24 August 1965) is a South Korean educator and politician. He is the incumbent Member of the National Assembly for Gimje-Buan, as well as the Secretary-General of the New Alternatives.

Born in Gimje, Kim studied law from Wonkwang University. He is the son of Kim Su-yeon, the founder of Hakseong Lecture Hall, died in 2019.

Kim was brought to the New Politics Alliance for Democracy (NPAD; then the Democratic Party of Korea) in 2015. He joined the People's Party (PP) in 2016 and was elected as the MP for Gimje-Buan in the same year. On 12 January 2020, he was appointed as the Secretary-General of the New Alternatives.

== Election results ==
=== General elections ===
Year	Constituency	Political party	Votes (%)	Remarks
2016	Gimje-Buan	PP	35,260 (45.96%)	Won
