= Centrist reformism =

South Korean political ideology

Centrist reformism (Korean: 중도개혁주의; Hanja: 中道改革主義; RR: Jungdogaehyeokjuui) is a South Korean political ideology. It is part of South Korea's centrist tradition.

In international standards, centrist reformism can be seen as conservative liberalism or liberal conservatism.

== History ==
The first party to put Jungdogaehyeok as its main ideology the Peace Democratic Party, a liberal party led by Kim Dae-jung in 1987. When the National Congress for New Politics was founded in 1995, it emphasized "moderate conservatives" (Korean: 온건 보수; Hanja: 穩健保守) more than Jungdogaehyeok to gain more support from conservatives. However, since the social liberal Roh Moo-hyun government, the term has not been used frequently for some time.

In 2016, the People Party officially put forward Jungdogaehyeok as its main ideology.

== Jungdogaehyeok parties ==
- Peace Democratic Party (1987–1991)
- Democratic Party (1991–1995)
- National Congress for New Politics (1995–2000)
- Democratic Party (2000–2007)
- Creative Korea Party (2007–2012)
- Democratic Party (2007–2008)
- People Party (2016–2018)
- Bareunmirae Party (2018–2020)
- Party for Democracy and Peace (2018–2020)
- New Alternatives (2019–2020)
- People Party (2020–2022)
- Party for Democracy and Peace (2020–present)
- New Future Democratic Party (2024–present)

== See also ==
- Centrist Reform Alliance, political party in Japan
- Liberalism in South Korea
- Centrism in South Korea
- Radical centrism
- Reformism
