= Kim Han-gil =

South Korean politician (born 1953)

- 김한길
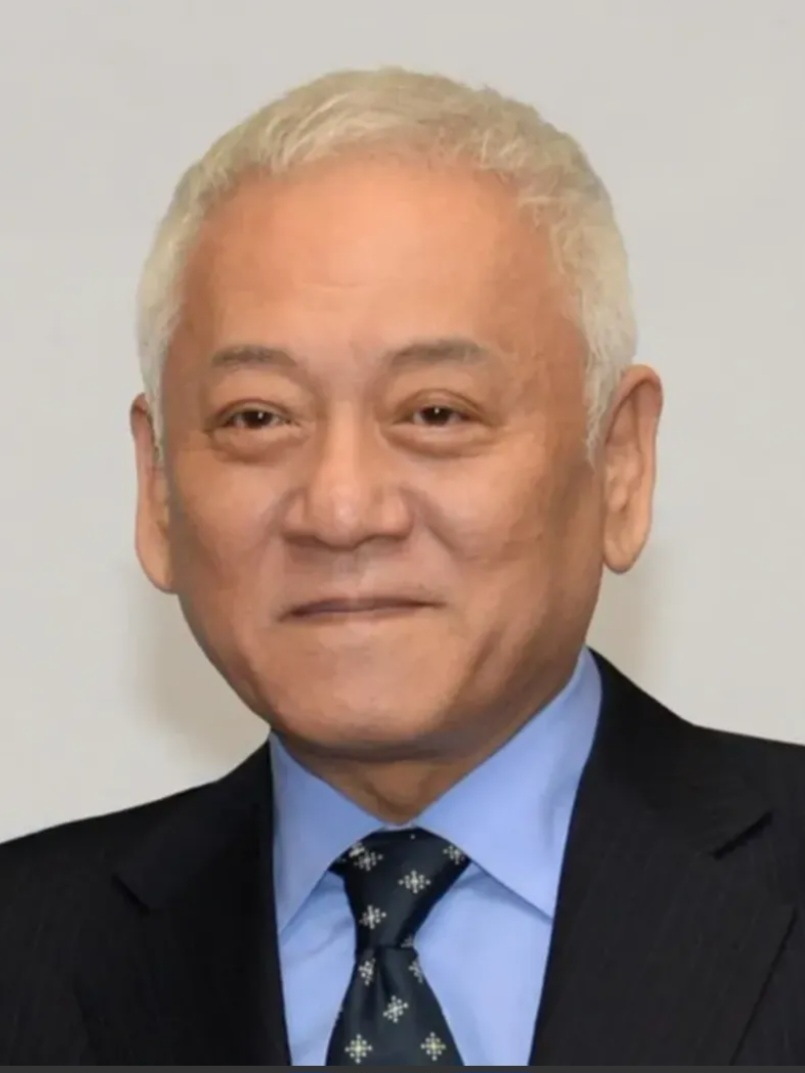
- Kim in 2013

Member of the National Assembly
- In office 30 May 2012 – 29 May 2016
- Preceded by: Gwon Taek-gi
- Succeeded by: Jun Hye-sook
- Constituency: Gwangjin A (Seoul)
- In office 30 May 1996 – 29 May 2008
- Preceded by: Lee Seung-chul
- Succeeded by: Park Young-sun
- Constituency: National (1996–1999); Proportional (2000); Guro B (Seoul, 2004–2008)

Leader of the New Politics Alliance for Democracy
- In office 26 March 2014 – 31 July 2014 Serving with Ahn Cheol-soo
- Preceded by: Position established
- Succeeded by: Park Young-sun (ERC); Moon Hee-sang (Interim); Moon Jae-in

Leader of the Democratic Party
- In office 4 May 2013 – 26 March 2014
- Preceded by: Lee Hae-chan; Moon Jae-in (acting); Park Ki-choon (Interim); Moon Hee-sang (Interim)
- Succeeded by: Position abolished

Minister of Culture and Tourism
- In office 20 September 2000 – 18 September 2001
- President: Kim Dae-jung
- Preceded by: Park Jie-won
- Succeeded by: Nam Gung-jin

Personal details
- Born: 17 September 1952 (age 74) Tokyo, Japan
- Party: NCNP → MDP → Uri → DP → CRDP → UDP → DP → DUP → DP → NPAD → Minjoo Party of Korea (1996–2016); People's Party (2016–2018) → Bareunmirae (2018–2020) → Minsaeng Party (2020–2022); Independent (2022–present)
- Spouse: Choi Myung-gil
- Education: Konkuk University
- Occupation: Journalist

Korean name
- Hangul: 김한길
- RR: Gim Hangil
- MR: Kim Han'gil

Kim Han-gil (Korean: 김한길; born 17 September 1953) is a South Korean politician, journalist, and writer. He served as a member of the 15th, 16th, 17th and 19th National Assembly and as the Minister of Culture and Tourism.

== Career ==
Having studied political science and journalism at Konkuk University, Kim worked as a journalist in the United States, writing for the Hankook Ilbo and the JoongAng Ilbo. He became active in the National Congress for New Politics in 1996, and remained a member of the main liberal party under its various names until 2016. He served as Minister of Culture and Tourism from 2000 to 2001, undertaking a highly publicized trip to North Korea on 10 March 2001, ostensibly to discuss tourism and culture arrangements. Subsequent to his trip, Kim announced an agreement to form a joint North–South team to compete in the 2001 World Table Tennis Championships, but North Korea rejected the arrangement later in March, citing "incomplete agreement and preparation problems".

Kim became a member of the National Assembly in 1996, but lost his seat in 2008. He returned to the Assembly in the 2012 elections, and became chairman of the Democratic Party in 2013. When the Democratic Party merged with Ahn Cheol-soo's New Political Vision Party to form the New Politics Alliance for Democracy in March 2014, Kim became co-chairman of the new party alongside Ahn. Kim and Ahn both resigned as co-chairmen three months later, however, following the party's disappointing performance in the 2014 by-elections, which had seen a conservative candidate win a constituency in South Jeolla Province for the first time in 26 years.

On 3 January 2016, after Ahn had left the NPAD's successor, the Minjoo Party of Korea, Kim announced that he was leaving the Minjoo Party to join Ahn as a founding member of the new People's Party. In March, in the lead-up to the 2016 legislative elections, Kim fell into dispute with Ahn over the need for an electoral alliance with the Minjoo Party. Kim resigned his position as co-chairman of the party's election campaign committee on March 11 over the dispute, and with Ahn refusing to pursue such a pact and co-chairman Chun Jung-bae backing down from the prospect, on March 17 he withdrew his candidacy for the upcoming elections. Kim nonetheless welcomed the results of the election, which were positive for the People's Party, stating that the day for a regime change was not far away.

He did not take active part when the People's Party joined the Bareun Mirae Party as it merged with the Bareun Party.

Kim is known for his "acerbic" remarks: in 2007 he labelled English teachers in Korea "white trash", and he criticized President Park Geun-hye for giving speeches in foreign languages overseas.

== Personal life ==
In October 2017, Kim was diagnosed with stage 4 lung cancer with a survival rate of 10% and he disappeared from the public scene. He got one lung removed and was unconscious for two weeks after the operation.

== Bibliography ==
=== Essays ===
- (1984) American Day. Original: (미국일기)
- (2000) Hangil Kim's Hope Diary. Original: (김한길의 희망일기)
- 2006) Don't Be Away When I Open My Eyes. Original: (눈뜨면 없어라)

=== Novels ===
- (1981) Wind and Stuffed. Original: (바람과 박제)
- (1981) The Death of Seneca. Original: (세네카의 죽음)
- (1989) Camel's Don't Cry Alone. Original (낙타는 따로 울지 않는다)
- (1991) A Woman's Man. Original: (여자의 남자)
- (1995) I Saw Her Standing. Original: (거기 그녀가 서 있는 걸 보았네)

== Election results ==
Year	Elections	Constituency	Political party	Votes (%)	Results
1992	14th National Assembly General Election	Dongjak B (Seoul)	UNP	22,424 (21.81%)	Defeated (3rd)
1996	15th National Assembly General Election	National (6th)	NCNP	4,971,961 (25.30%)	Elected
2000	16th National Assembly General Election	Proportional representation (13th)	MDP	6,780,359 (35.89%)	Elected
2001	2001 By-election	Guro B (Seoul)	MDP	23,411 (42.74%)	Defeated (2nd)
2004	17th National Assembly General Election	Guro B (Seoul)	Uri	48,673 (54.00%)	Won
2012	19th National Assembly General Election	Gwangjin A (Seoul)	DUP	44,334 (52.11%)	Won

Political offices
Preceded by Park Jie-won	Minister of Culture, Sports and Tourism; 20 September 2000–18 September 2001	Succeeded by Namgoong-jin
National Assembly of the Republic of Korea
Preceded by	Member of the National Assembly; National (6th, National Congress for New Politics); 30 May 1996–3 March 1999	Succeeded by
Preceded by	Member of the National Assembly from Proportional representation (13th, Millennium Democratic Party); 30 May 2000–20 September 2000	Succeeded by
Preceded by Lee Seung-chul	Member of the National Assembly from Guro B (Seoul); 30 May 2004–29 May 2008	Succeeded by Park Young-sun
Preceded by Kwon Tak-ki	Member of the National Assembly from Gwangjin A (Seoul); 30 May 2012–29 May 2016	Succeeded by Jun Hye-sook
Party political offices
Preceded by Chung Sye-kyun	Floor Leader of the Uri Party; 24 January 2006–23 January 2007	Succeeded by Jang Young-dal
Preceded by Lee Hae-chan (Chairman of the Democratic United Party); Moon Jae-in (Acting); Park Ki-choon (Interim); Moon Hee-sang (Interim)	Leader of the Democratic Party; 4 May 2013–26 March 2014	Succeeded by Office abolished
Preceded by New Office	Co-Leader of the New Politics Alliance for Democracy (with Ahn Cheol-soo); 26 March 2014–4 August 2014	Succeeded by Park Young-sun (Interim); Moon Hee-sang (Interim); Moon Jae-in
