= Gwangjin A =

South Korean political division

- Single-member constituency for the National Assembly
- Location of the constituency
- District(s): Gwangjin District (part)
- Region: Seoul
- Electorate: 152,431 (2016)

Current constituency
- Created: 1996
- Seats: 1
- Party: Democratic Party
- Member: Lee Jeong-heon
- Council constituency: Gwangjin 1st district Gwangjin 2nd district
- Created from: Seongdong C

Gwangjin A (Korean: 광진구 갑) is a constituency of the National Assembly of South Korea. The constituency consists of part of Gwangjin District, Seoul. As of 2016, 152,431 eligible voters were registered in the constituency.

== List of members of the National Assembly ==
Election	Member	Party	Dates	Notes
1996	Kim Sang-woo	National Congress	1996–2000	
2000	Kim Young-choon	Grand National	2000–2008	Secretary for Political Affairs (1993–1994); Chief Secretary to the Uri Party (2007); Minister of Oceans and Fisheries (2017–2019); Secretary-General of the National Assembly (2020)
2004	Kim Young-choon	Uri	2000–2008	Secretary for Political Affairs (1993–1994); Chief Secretary to the Uri Party (2007); Minister of Oceans and Fisheries (2017–2019); Secretary-General of the National Assembly (2020)
2008	Kwon Taek-gi	Grand National	2008–2012	
2012	Kim Han-gil	Democratic United	2012–2016	Senior Secretary for Policy planning (1999–2000); Minister of Culture and Tourism (2000–2001); Floor leader Uri Party (2006–2007); Leader of the Democratic Party (2013–2014); Co-leader of the New Politics Alliance for Democracy (2014)
2016	Jun Hye-sook	Democratic	2016–2024	Left the Democratic Party on 11 March 2024
2020	Jun Hye-sook	Democratic	2016–2024	Left the Democratic Party on 11 March 2024
2024	Lee Jeong-heon	Democratic	2024–present	

== Election results ==
=== 2024 ===
Legislative Election 2024: Gwangjin A
Party	Candidate	Votes	%	±%
Democratic	Lee Jeong-heon	54,105	52.53	▼1.15
People Power	Kim Byung-min	48,881	47.46	▲6.86
Rejected ballots		1,325	–	
Turnout		104,311	69.5	▲1.47
Registered electors		150,187		
Democratic gain from Independent		Swing		

=== 2020 ===
Legislative Election 2020: Gwangjin A
Party	Candidate	Votes	%	±%
Democratic	Jun Hye-sook	56,608	53.7	+13.0
United Future	Kim Byeong-min	42,822	40.6	+2.7
Justice	Oh Bong-seok	3,690	3.5	new
Minsaeng	Lim Dong-sun	1,842	1.7	−18.2
National Revolutionary Dividends	Lee Seung-wook	492	0.5	new
Rejected ballots		1,052	–	–
Turnout		106,506	68.0	+9.5
Registered electors		156,559		
Democratic hold				

=== 2016 ===
Legislative Election 2016: Gwangjin A
Party	Candidate	Votes	%	±%
Democratic	Jun Hye-sook	35,855	40.7	−11.4
Saenuri	Jeong Song-hak	33,445	37.9	−6.6
People	Lim Dong-soon	17,573	19.9	new
Employment and Welfare Pension Promotion Alliance	Lee Jung-hee	770	0.9	new
Hannara	Paik Seung-won	507	0.6	new
Rejected ballots		1,041	–	–
Turnout		89,191	58.5	+1.7
Registered electors		152,431		
Democratic hold		Swing		

=== 2012 ===
Legislative Election 2012: Gwangjin A
Party	Candidate	Votes	%	±%
Democratic United	Kim Han-gil	44,334	52.1	+16.3
Saenuri	Jeong Song-hak	37,902	44.5	−9.3
Independent	Kim Yong	2,840	3.3	new
Rejected ballots		443	–	–
Turnout		85,519	56.8	+13.9
Registered electors		150,634		
Democratic United gain from Saenuri		Swing		

=== 2008 ===
Legislative Election 2008: Gwangjin A
Party	Candidate	Votes	%	±%
Grand National	Kwon Taek-gi	33,255	53.8	+13.2
United Democratic	Lim Dong-soon	22,123	35.8	new
Liberty Forward	Kim Joon-kyo	4,425	7.2	new
Family Federation	Lim Young-joon	2,034	3.3	new
Rejected ballots		757	–	–
Turnout		62,594	42.9	−18.5
Registered electors		145,896		
Grand National gain from Democratic		Swing		

=== 2004 ===
Legislative Election 2004: Gwangjin A
Party	Candidate	Votes	%	±%
Uri	Kim Young-choon	44,519	50.7	−0.1
Grand National	Hong Hee-gon	35,646	40.6	−10.2
Millennium Democratic	Lim Dong-soon	6,167	7.0	−34.4
Independent	Kim Kwang-hae	783	0.9	new
Independent	Ma Seok-gu	424	0.5	new
Independent	Choi Nak-sun	214	0.2	new
Rejected ballots		723	–	–
Turnout		88,476	61.4	+7.1
Registered electors		144,174		
Uri gain from Grand National		Swing		

=== 2000 ===
Legislative Election 2000: Gwangjin A
Party	Candidate	Votes	%	±%
Grand National	Kim Young-choon	37,446	50.8	+22.9
Millennium Democratic	Kim Sang-woo	30,518	41.4	+11.8
United Liberal Democrats	Park Myung-jin	2,797	3.8	−7.2
Senior Progressive	Jeong Eun-hee	2,953	4.0	new
Rejected ballots		654	–	–
Turnout		74,368	54.3	−6.8
Registered electors		136,953		
Grand National gain from Millennium Democratic		Swing		

=== 1996 ===
Legislative Election 1996: Gwangjin A
Party	Candidate	Votes	%	±%
National Congress	Kim Sang-woo	23,636	29.6	new
New Korea	Kim Young-choon	22,309	27.9	new
Democratic	Kang Su-rim	12,321	15.4	new
Independent	Kim Do-hyun	12,173	15.2	new
United Liberal Democrats	Park Jong-cheol	8,785	11.0	new
Independent	Lee Tae-hee	650	0.8	new
Rejected ballots		1,250	–	–
Turnout		81,124	61.1	–
Registered electors		132,766		
National Congress win (new seat)				

== See also ==
- List of constituencies of the National Assembly of South Korea
