= Chung-Ang University School of Law =

Law school in Seoul, South Korea

Chung-Ang Law School
- Type: Public
- Established: 2009
- Dean: Kim Jung-gwon
- Students: 150 JD (=50X3)
- Location: Seoul, South Korea
- Campus: Urban
- Website: Chung-Ang Law School

Chung-Ang Law School is one of the professional graduate schools of Chung-Ang University, located in Seoul, South Korea. Founded in 2009, it is one of the founding law schools in South Korea and is one of the smaller schools with each class in the three-year J.D. program having approximately 50 students.

== History ==
The law school traces its history to the major of law founded in May 1949 and later the college of law was founded on 1953 There are 5,166 graduates as of 2009 and 300 in practice of law.

== Programs ==
- Chung-Ang Law specializes on the culture, media and entertainment law.
- The law school has a dual degree (JD/LLM) program with Indiana University Maurer School of Law-Bloomington.

=== SJD Program ===
The school offers SJD degrees on 14 special areas such as civil law, criminal law and international law etc.

== Tuition ==
The tuition is around 18 million Korean Won per year and the school allocates 30% of the total tuition receipt to academic scholarship.

== Faculty ==
- Lee Sang-don Professor

== Institute ==
- Korean Broadcasting Law Institute
- Natural Resource Energy Law Institute
- Bio Energy Law Institute
- Culture, Media, Entertainment Law Institute

== Publications ==
- Chung-Ang Law Review

== Website ==
- Official Website
- Law Library
