= Chun Jung-bae =

South Korean politician

- 천정배
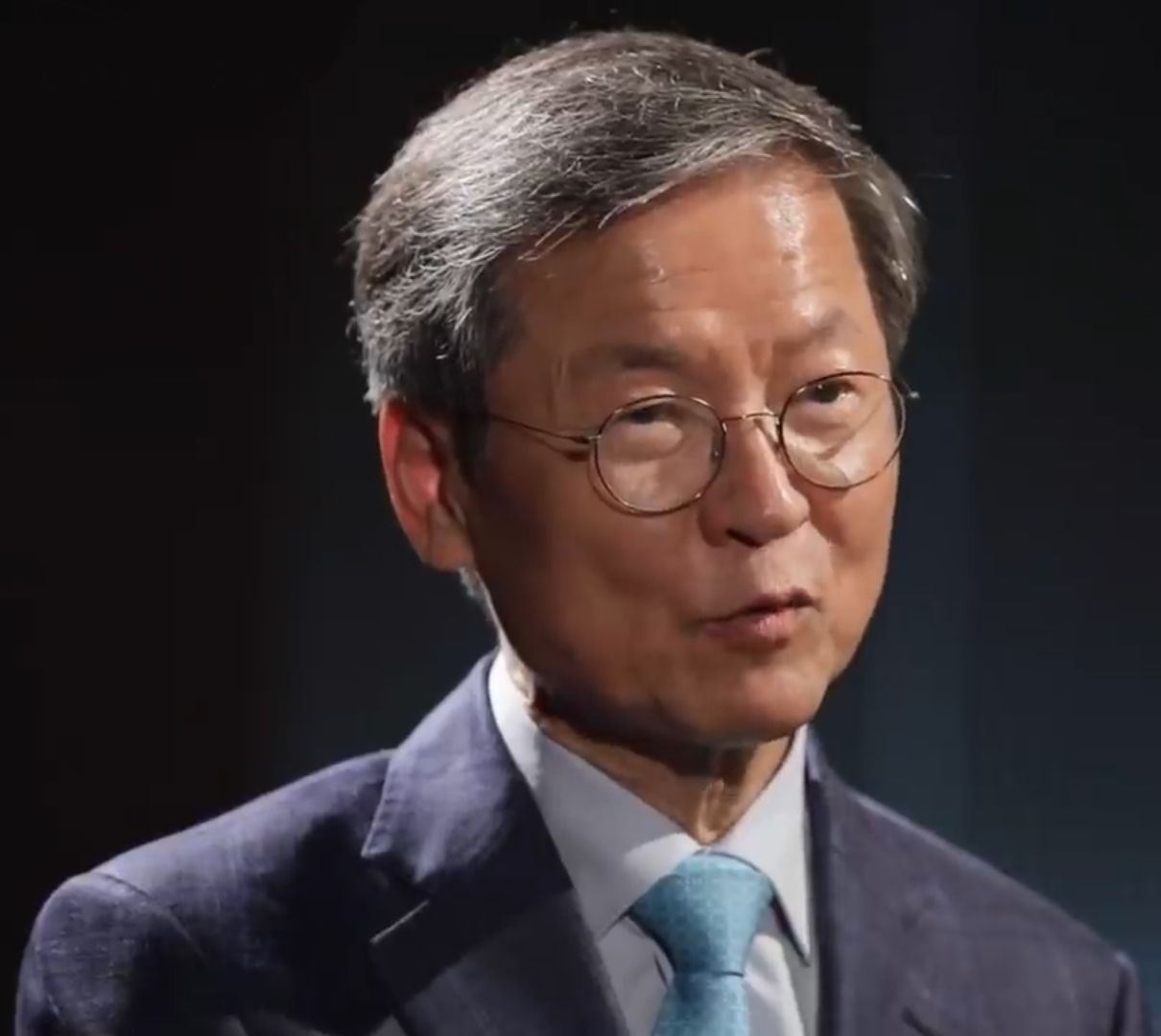
- Chun in 2021

Chairman of the People's Party
- In office 2 February 2016 – 29 June 2016 Serving with Ahn Cheol-soo
- Preceded by: Position established
- Succeeded by: Park Jie-won

Member of the National Assembly
- In office 30 April 2015 – 29 May 2020
- Preceded by: Oh Byeong-yun
- Succeeded by: Yang Hyang-ja
- Constituency: Gwangju Seo B
- In office 30 May 1996 – 29 May 2012
- Preceded by: Chang Kyung-woo (Ansan–Ongjin, Gyeonggi)
- Succeeded by: Kim Myung-yeon
- Constituency: Gyeonggi Ansan B (1996–2004); Gyeonggi Ansan Danwon A (2004–2012)

Minister of Justice
- In office 29 June 2005 – 26 July 2006
- President: Roh Moo-hyun
- Prime Minister: Lee Hae-chan; Han Duck-soo (acting); Han Myeong-sook
- Preceded by: Kim Seung-kew
- Succeeded by: Kim Seong-ho

Personal details
- Born: 12 December 1954 (age 71) Yeontae-myeon, Sinan County, South Jeolla Province, South Korea
- Citizenship: South Korean
- Party: Democratic (2021–present)
- Other political affiliations: NCNP (1995–2000); MDP (2000–2003); Uri (2003–2007); GUDNP (2007–2008); UDP (2008); Democratic (2008–2011); DUP (2011–2013); Democratic (2013–2014); NPAD (2014–2015); Independent (2015–2016); People's (2016–2018); PDP (2018–2019); Independent (2019–2020); New Alternatives (2020); Minsaeng (2020–2021)
- Education: Seoul National University
- Occupation: Lawyer

- Chun Jung-bae
- Hangul: 천정배
- Hanja: 千正培
- RR: Cheon Jeongbae
- MR: Ch'ŏn Chŏngbae

Chun Jung-bae (Korean: 천정배; born 12 December 1954) is a South Korean politician who was the joint chairman of the People's Party, alongside Ahn Cheol-soo. He is a member of the National Assembly for Gwangju Seo B since 2015, having previously represented Gyeonggi Ansan B·Ansan Danwon A from 1996 to 2012. He served as Minister of Justice from 2005 to 2006 under President Roh Moo-hyun.

Chun was credited with securing Roh's victory in the 2002 presidential election and, as floor leader of Roh's Uri Party, the party's subsequent majority in the 2004 legislative election. In 2007, Chun defected from the Uri Party to the United New Democratic Party after entering into conflict with other members of the pro-Roh group, including then-presidential chief of staff Moon Jae-in.

After standing unsuccessfully for a seat in Seoul in the 2012 elections for the Democratic United Party, Chun organized the presidential nomination campaign of Kim Doo-kwan as an alternative candidate to Moon, who would become the party's nominee. Continuing to oppose Moon, by that time party leader, he left the DUP's successor the New Politics Alliance for Democracy in March 2015, citing the party's lack of reformist leadership. He ran as an independent that year in a by-election in Gwangju, commonly viewed as a stronghold of the main liberal party, and defeated the NPAD candidate in a shock landslide victory on April 29, returning to the Assembly. In September 2015, a number of NPAD lawmakers in contact with Chun defected from the party, triggering speculation over the formation of a new party; on September 19, Chun publicly announced that he would establish a new party in opposition to the NPAD.

Chun established a new People's Reform Party, and joined forces with Ahn Cheol-soo in January 2016 to form the People's Party. In the lead-up to the 2016 parliamentary elections, however, Chun came into conflict with Ahn in March over the prospect of an electoral alliance with the Minjoo Party of Korea, the NPAD's successor; Chun vowed to boycott party meetings until Ahn withdrew from his opposition to such a pact. He backed down after a private meeting with Ahn on March 15, and the alliance with the Minjoo Party ultimately failed to materialize.

On December 26, 2016, he declared that he will be running for President in 2017 and will face his former co-leader Ahn.

== Election results ==
Year	Elections	Constituency	Political party	Votes (%)	Results
1996	15th National Assembly General Election	Ansan B (Gyeonggi)	NCNP	36,902 (38.80%)	Won
2000	16th National Assembly General Election	Ansan B (Gyeonggi)	MDP	37,523 (49.51%)	Won
2004	17th National Assembly General Election	Ansan Danwon A (Gyeonggi)	Uri	32,094 (58.21%)	Won
2008	18th National Assembly General Election	Ansan Danwon A (Gyeonggi)	UDP	23,044 (49.12%)	Won
2012	19th National Assembly General Election	Songpa B (Seoul)	DUP	46,010 (46.02%)	Defeated (2nd)
2015	2015 By-election	Seo B (Gwangju)	Independent	26,256 (52.37%)	Won
2016	20th National Assembly General Election	Seo B (Gwangju)	People's	42,599 (54.52%)	Won
2020	21st National Assembly General Election	Seo B (Gwangju)	Minsaeng	15,754 (19.49%)	Defeated (2nd)

Political offices
Preceded by Kim Seung-kew	Minister of Justice of the Republic of Korea; 29 June 2005–26 July 2006	Succeeded by Kim Seong-ho
National Assembly of the Republic of Korea
Preceded by Jang Kyung-woo (Ansan–Ongjin, Gyeonggi)	Member of the National Assembly from Ansan B (Gyeonggi); 30 May 1996–29 May 2004	Succeeded by Himself (Ansan Danwon A, Gyeonggi); Jae Jong-gil (Ansan Danwon B, Gyeonggi)
Preceded by Himself (Ansan B, Gyeonggi)	Member of the National Assembly from Ansan Danwon A (Gyeonggi); 30 May 2004–29 May 2012	Succeeded by Kim Myung-yeon
Preceded by Oh Byeong-yun	Member of the National Assembly from Gwangju Seo B (Gwangju); 30 April 2015–29 May 2020	Succeeded by Yang Hyang-ja
Party political offices
Preceded by Kim Geun-tae	Floor Leader of the Uri Party; 11 May 2004–3 January 2005	Succeeded by Chung Sye-kyun
Preceded by New Office	Co-Leader of the People's Party (With Ahn Cheol-soo); 2 February 2016–29 June 2016	Succeeded by Park Jie-won (Interim); Kim Dong-cheol (Interim); Park Jie-won
