= Peace and Justice =

2018 political party in South Korea

Members group of Peace and Justice 평화와 정의의 의원 모임
- Chamber: National Assembly
- Legislature(s): 20th
- Foundation: 2 April 2018
- Dissolution: 23 July 2018
- Member parties: Party for Democracy and Peace and Justice Party
- President: Jang Byeong-wan
- Constituency: Dong District·Nam District A (Gwangju)
- Representation: 19 / 300
- Ideology: Reformism; Liberalism

- Peace and Justice
- Hangul: 평화와 정의의 의원 모임
- Hanja: 平和와 正義의 議員 모임
- RR: Pyeonghwawa jeonguiui uiwon moim
- MR: P'yŏnghwawa chŏngŭiŭi ŭiwŏn moim

Members group of Peace and Justice (Korean: 평화와 정의의 의원 모임), or Peace and Justice (평화와 정의) for short, was a South Korean parliamentary grouping that was formed on 2 April 2018. The technical group consists of Party for Democracy and Peace and Justice Party.

== History ==
Both Democracy and Peace and Justice were non-parliamentary groups in South Korea, due to the law requiring at least 20 members to form a parliamentary group. Democracy and Peace and Justice, with 14 and 6 members of the National Assembly respectively, chose to form a parliamentary group to bolster their voices in the National Assembly after rounds of negotiations. The grouping became the fourth parliamentary group after Democratic Party of Korea, Liberty Korea Party and Bareunmirae Party. The grouping was automatically dissolved with the death of Justice Party lawmaker Roh Hoe-chan on July 23, falling below the 20-member requirement.
