= Jun Hye-sook =

South Korean politician

- 전혜숙
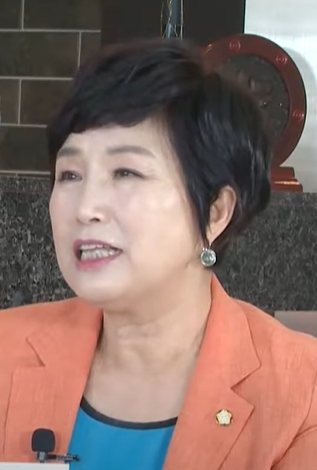

Member of the National Assembly
- In office 30 May 2016 – 29 May 2024
- Preceded by: Kim Han-gil
- Succeeded by: Lee Jeong-heon
- Constituency: Seoul Gwangjin A
- In office 30 May 2008 – 29 May 2012
- Constituency: Proportional representation

Personal details
- Born: 5 May 1955 (age 71) Chilgok, North Gyeongsang, South Korea
- Party: Independent
- Education: Yeungnam University; Sungkyunkwan University
- Occupation: Pharmacist

Korean name
- Hangul: 전혜숙
- Hanja: 全惠淑
- RR: Jeon Hyesuk
- MR: Chŏn Hyesuk

Jun Hye-sook (Korean: 전혜숙; Hanja: 全惠淑; born 5 May 1955) is a South Korean politician in the liberal Minjoo Party of Korea, and a member of the National Assembly representing Gwangjin A, Seoul. She was previously a party list member of the Assembly from 2008 to 2012.

Before entering politics, she worked as a pharmacist, serving as president of the North Gyeongsang Pharmaceutical Association from 1998 to 2004.

== Election results ==
Year	Elections	Constituency	Political party	Votes (%)	Results
2004	17th National Assembly General Election	Proportional representation (42nd)	Uri	8,145,824 (38.26%)	Not Elected
2008	18th National Assembly General Election	Proportional representation (5th)	UDP	4,313,645 (25.17%)	Elected
2016	20th National Assembly General Election	Gwangjin A (Seoul)	Democratic	35,855 (40.67%)	Won
2020	21st National Assembly General Election	Gwangjin A (Seoul)	Democratic	56,608 (53.68%)	Won
