= Yu Sung-yup =

South Korean politician (1960–2025)

- 유성엽
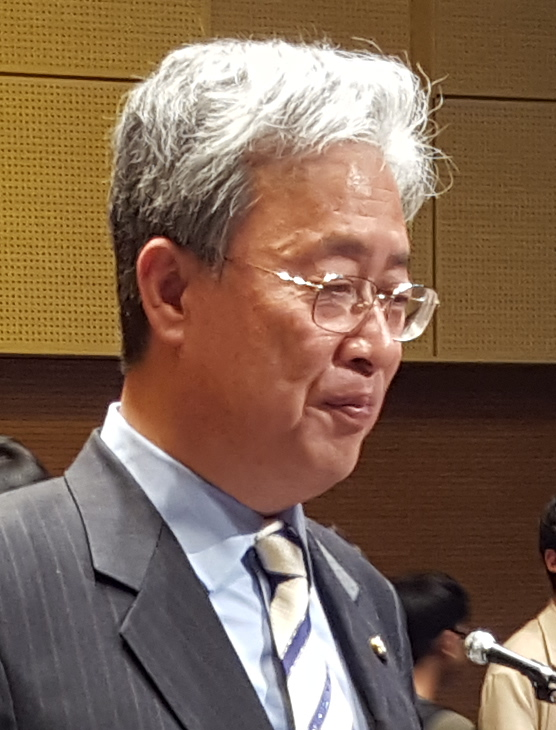
- Yu in 2018

President of the Minsaeng Party
- In office 24 February 2020 – 20 April 2020 serving with Kim Jung-hwa from 24 March 2020 to 20 April 2020 served with Park Joo-hyun until 23 March 2020
- Preceded by: Position established
- Succeeded by: Lee Su-bong (acting)

Member of the National Assembly
- In office 30 May 2016 – 29 May 2020
- Preceded by: Himself (as Jeongeup); Kim Choon-jin (as Gochang)
- Succeeded by: Yoon Joon-byung
- Constituency: Jeongeup-Gochang (North Jeolla)
- In office 30 May 2008 – 29 May 2016
- Preceded by: Kim Won-ki
- Succeeded by: Himself (as Jeongeup-Gochang)
- Constituency: Jeongeup (North Jeolla)

Mayor of Jeongeup
- In office 1 July 2002 – 8 February 2006
- Preceded by: Kuk Seung-rock
- Succeeded by: Kang Kwang

Personal details
- Born: 25 January 1960 Jeongeup, South Korea
- Died: 24 June 2025 (aged 65)
- Party: Democratic
- Other political affiliations: MDP; Uri; UDP; NPAD; PP; PDP; NA; Minsaeng
- Education: Seoul National University
- Occupation: Politician

Yu Sung-yup (Korean: 유성엽, 25 January 1960 – 24 June 2025) was a South Korean politician who was the Member of the National Assembly for Jeongeup from 2008 (also for Gochang from 2016) to 2020. He was also the co-president of the Minsaeng Party, serving with Park Joo-hyun. He formerly served as the mayor of Jeongeup from 2002 to 2006. As a former member of the Party for Democracy and Peace, he was the party's vice president from 2018 to 2019 and the parliamentary leader from May to August 2019.

== Career ==
Yu was the candidate for mayor of Jeongup from the Millennium Democratic Party (MDP) during the local election in 2002. He defeated the incumbent Kuk Seung-rock who faced harsh criticisms at the end of his term. He left the MDP and joined the Uri Party in October 2003. He ran for the party's primary of Governor of North Jeolla in the early 2006, but defeated by Kim Wan-joo.

He won as an independent candidate for Jeongeup during the parliamentary election in 2008 and won again in 2012. Later, he shortly entered New Politics Alliance for Democracy but left the party and joined People's Party. In 2016, he ran for the newly formed Jeongeup-Gochang constituency and defeated Ha Jeong-yeol of the Democratic Party.

In the early 2018, Yu left the People's Party and joined the newly formed Party for Democracy and Peace (PDP). He ran for the party's presidency during the leadership election in August 2018 but came behind Chung Dong-young, a former presidential candidate in 2007 South Korean presidential election. Instead, he became one of the Vice Presidents, but quit the position when he was elected the party's parliamentary leader.

On 12 August 2019, Yu left the PDP along with the party's dissidents group named Alternative Political Alliance for Change and Hope (later the New Alternatives). On 24 February 2020, he was elected as the co-president of the newly formed Minsaeng Party, along with Park Joo-hyun.

On 30 December 2021, Yu was one of the 12 former MPs who joined or returned to the ruling Democratic Party. On 24 June 2025, Yu died from a stroke, at the age of 65.

== Ideology ==
Yu was a conservative and economically liberal who criticised President Moon Jae-in. He opposed Moon's Keynesian economic policy while advocating tax reductions. He also had a sceptical view towards minimum wages.

During the COVID-19 pandemic, Yu urged the government to ban Chinese citizens from entering South Korea in order to protect locals.

== Election results ==
=== General elections ===
Year	Elections	Constituency	Political party	Votes (%)	Remarks
2008	18th National Assembly General Election	Jeongeup (North Jeolla)	Independent	33,489 (61.03%)	Won
2012	19th National Assembly General Election	Jeongeup (North Jeolla)	Independent	28,810 (48.73%)	Won
2016	20th National Assembly General Election	Jeongeup–Gochang (North Jeolla)	People's	43,670 (47.96%)	Won
2020	21st National Assembly General Election	Jeongeup–Gochang (North Jeolla)	Minsaeng	28,186 (30.22%)	Defeated

=== Local elections ===
==== Mayor of Jeongeup ====
Year	Elections	constituency	Political party	Votes (%)	Remarks
2002	3rd Iocal Election	Mayor of Jeongeup	MDP	22,699 (34.98%)	Won
