= Conservative liberalism =

Political ideology representing the conservative wing of the liberal movement

Conservative liberalism, also referred to as right-liberalism, is a variant of liberalism combining liberal values and policies with conservative stances, or simply representing the right wing of the liberal movement. In the case of modern conservative liberalism, scholars sometimes see it as a less radical variant of classical liberalism; it is also referred to as an individual tradition that distinguishes it from classical liberalism and social liberalism. Conservative liberal parties usually combine liberal policies with more traditional stances on social and ethical issues (in some countries this form of right-wing liberalism is traditionally known as national liberalism). Despite some differences, there are strong similarities between original ordoliberalism and the conservative-liberal thought, particularly in its German, British, Canadian, French, Italian, and American manifestations and it can be considered one of its components.

In general, liberal conservatism and conservative liberalism have different philosophical roots. Historically, liberal conservatism refers mainly to the case where conservatives embrace the elements of classical liberalism, and conservative liberalism refers to classical liberals who support a laissez-faire economy as well as socially conservative principles. Since conservatives gradually accepted classical liberal institutions, there is very little to distinguish liberal conservatives from conservative liberals. Neoconservatism has also been identified as an ideological relative or twin to conservative liberalism, and some similarities exist also between conservative liberalism and national liberalism.

== Overview ==
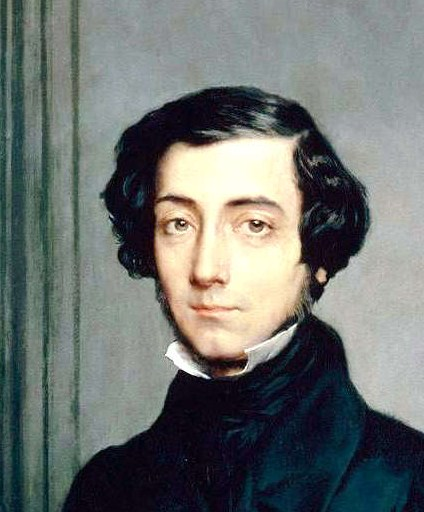
Alexis de Tocqueville had a major influence on the modern philosophy of conservative liberalism.

Conservative liberalism emerged in late 18th-century France and the United Kingdom, when the moderate bourgeoisie supported the monarchy within the liberal camp. Representatively, Doctrinaires, which existed during the Bourbon Restoration was a representative conservative-liberal party. Radicalism, the leftward flank of liberalism during the late 18th and early 19th centuries that is referred to as classical radicalism, emerged as an opposition against the moderateness of these conservative liberals. Whiggism, or Whig liberalism, in the United Kingdom also forms early conservative liberalism and is distinguished from the Radicals (radical liberalism).

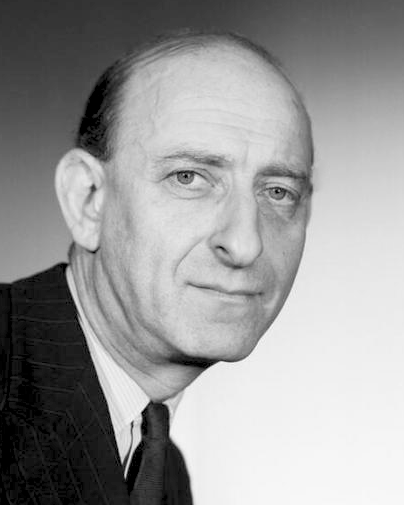
Raymond Aron is known as Jean-Paul Sartre's "great intellectual opponent".

According to Robert Kraynak, a professor at Colgate University, rather than "following progressive liberalism (i.e. social liberalism), conservative liberals draw upon pre-modern sources, such as classical philosophy (with its ideas of virtue, the common good, and natural rights), Christianity (with its ideas of natural law, the social nature of man, and original sin), and ancient institutions (such as common law, corporate bodies, and social hierarchies). This gives their liberalism a conservative foundation. It means following Socrates, Plato, Aristotle, St. Augustine, St. Thomas Aquinas, and Edmund Burke rather than Locke or Kant; it usually includes a deep sympathy for the politics of the Greek polis, the Roman Republic, and Christian monarchies. But, as realists, conservative liberals acknowledge that classical and medieval politics cannot be restored in the modern world. And, as moralists, they see that the modern experiment in liberty and self-government has the positive effect of enhancing human dignity as well as providing an opening (even in the midst of mass culture) for transcendent longings for eternity. At its practical best, conservative liberalism promotes ordered liberty under God and establishes constitutional safeguards against tyranny. It shows that a regime of liberty based on traditional morality and classical-Christian culture is an achievement we can be proud of, rather than merely defensive about, as trustees of Western civilization."

In the European context, conservative liberalism should not be confused with liberal conservatism, which is a variant of conservatism combining conservative views with liberal policies in regards to the economy, social and ethical issues. The roots of conservative liberalism are to be found at the beginning of the history of liberalism. Until the two world wars, the political class in most European countries from Germany to Italy was formed by conservative liberals. The events such as World War I occurring after 1917 brought the more radical version of classical liberalism to a more conservative (i.e. more moderate) type of liberalism. Conservative liberal parties have tended to develop in those European countries where there was no strong secular conservative party and where the separation of church and state was less of an issue. In those countries, where the conservative parties were Christian democratic, this conservative brand of liberalism developed.

== Political stance ==
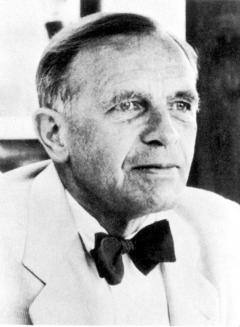
Wilhelm Röpke was representative of ordoliberalism.

Conservative liberalism is generally a liberal ideology that contrasts with social liberalism. Conservative liberalism, along with social liberalism and classical liberalism, is mentioned as the main liberal ideology of European politics. While there are conservative liberals who are located on the right-wing political position, conservative liberalism is often used to describe liberalism close to the political centre to the centre-right of the political spectrum.

=== Social, classical and conservative liberalism ===
Social liberalism is a combination of economic Keynesianism and cultural liberalism. Classical liberalism is economic liberalism that largely embraces cultural liberalism. Conservative liberalism is an ideology that highlights the conservative aspect of liberalism, so it can appear in a somewhat different form depending on the local reality. Conservative liberalism refers to ideologies that show relatively conservative tendencies within the liberal camp, so it has some relative meaning. In the United States, conservative liberals mean de facto classical liberals; in Europe, Christian democrats and ordoliberals can also be included. Christian democracy is a mainstream European conservative ideology, so there are cases where it supports free markets, such as Röpke.

== By country ==
=== France ===
Alexis de Tocqueville and Adolphe Thiers were representative French conservative liberals. They were classified as centre-left liberals (progressive-Orléanists) during the July Monarchy alone; after the French Revolution of 1848, the now French Second Republic entered and they were relegated to conservative liberals.

=== Germany ===
Before World War II, conservative liberalism or right-liberalism (German: Rechtsliberalismus) was often used in a similar sense to national-liberalism (German: Nationalliberalismus). National Liberal Party during the German Empire and German People's Party during the Weimar Republic are representative. "Right-liberalism" and "national liberalism" are used in similar meanings in Germany. According to the German Wikipedia, most of the national liberals during the Weimar Republic joined the CDU, a liberal-conservative party. For this reason, the terms "conservative liberalism" are not often used in Germany.

Ordoliberalism is more a variant of conservative liberalism than classical liberalism, which is economic liberalism that embraces cultural liberalism, or social liberalism, in principle because it is influenced by the notion of social justice based on traditional Catholic teachings. After the war, Germany pursued economic growth based on the social market economy, which is deeply related to ordoliberalism.

=== United Kingdom ===
In the United Kingdom, David Hume, Adam Smith, and Edmund Burke have been identified as conservative liberals.

=== United States ===
In the United States, liberal usually refers to a social liberal form. As such, those referred to as conservative liberals in Europe are often simply referred to as conservatives in the United States. Milton Friedman and Irving Kristol are mentioned as representative conservative liberal scholars. Political scientists evaluate all politicians in the United States as liberals in the academic sense. In general, rather than the Democratic Party, which is close to social liberalism, the Republican Party is evaluated as a conservative-liberal party. In the case of the Democratic Party, the Blue Dog Coalition is evaluated as close to conservative-liberal in fiscal policy, and as moderate to liberal on cultural issues. Conservative liberals in Europe, such as Finland's Centre Party, sometimes criticize cultural liberalism.

Peter Lawler, a professor at Berry College, argued that American neoconservatives might be classified as conservative liberals:

[I]n America today, responsible liberals—who are usually called neoconservatives—see that liberalism depends on human beings who are somewhat child-centered, patriotic, and religious. These responsible liberals praise these non-individualistic human propensities in an effort to shore up liberalism. One of their slogans is "conservative sociology with liberal politics." The neoconservatives recognize that the politics of free and rational individuals depends upon a pre-political social world that is far from free and rational as a whole.

== Notable thinkers ==
- David Hume (1711–1776)
- Adam Smith (1723–1790)
- Edmund Burke (1729–1797)
- Marquis de Lafayette (1757–1834)
- François Guizot (1787–1874)
- Adolphe Thiers (1797–1877)
- Alexis de Tocqueville (1805–1859)
- William Ewart Gladstone (1809–1898)
- Camillo Benso (1810–1861)
- Stanley Baldwin (1867–1947)
- Winston Churchill (1874–1965)
- Gustav Stresemann (1878–1929)
- Paul Reynaud (1878–1966)
- Benedetto Croce (1866-1952)
- Joseph Schumpeter (1883–1950)
- Walter Eucken (1891–1950)
- Robert Menzies (1894–1978)
- Ludwig Erhard (1897–1977)
- Wilhelm Ropke (1899–1966)
- Friedrich Hayek (1899–1992)
- Michael Oakeshott (1901–1990)
- Ayn Rand (1905–1982)
- Raymond Aron (1905–1983)
- Hannah Arendt (1906-1975)
- Milton Friedman (1912–2006)
- Erik von Kuehnelt-Leddihn (1919–1999)
- Irving Kristol (1920–2009)
- Helmut Schoeck (1922–1993)
- Francis Fukuyama (born 1952)

== List of conservative-liberal parties or parties with conservative-liberal factions ==
=== Current parties ===
- Argentina: Republican Proposal, Union of the Democratic Centre, Christian Democratic Party
- Australia: Liberal Party of Australia
- Belgium: Open Flemish Liberals and Democrats, Reformist Movement, Libertarian, Direct, Democratic
- Brazil: Progressive Party, Social Democratic Party (factions), Liberal Party, New Party
- Bulgaria: National Movement for Stability and Progress
- Canada: CentreBC, Coalition Avenir Québec, Saskatchewan Party
- Chile: Evópoli
- Croatia: Croatian Social Liberal Party
- Czech Republic: Mayors and Independents, TOP 09, Civic Democratic Party, ANO 2011
- Denmark: Venstre–Liberal Party of Denmark
- Estonia: Estonian Reform Party
- El Salvador: Nuevas Ideas, GANA
- Faroe Islands: Union Party, People's Party
- Finland: National Coalition Party, Centre Party
- France: The Republicans, Horizons, The Centrists
- Germany: Free Democratic Party
- Ghana: New Patriotic Party
- Greece: New Democracy
- Greenland: Feeling of Community
- Hungary: Tisza Party
- Iceland: Independence Party
- Ireland: Fianna Fáil, Fine Gael
- Israel: Likud, Telem, New Hope
- Italy: Forza Italia
- Japan: Liberal Democratic Party (Note: Since 2012, the LDP has been controversial due to its relations to ultranationalism and neo-fascism. Major LDP members are linked to the far-right Nippon Kaigi.)
- Latvia: Unity
- Lithuania: Liberals' Movement, Freedom and Justice
- Luxembourg: Democratic Party
- Mexico: National Action Party
- Moldova: Liberal Party, Liberal Reformist Party
- Netherlands: People's Party for Freedom and Democracy, JA21
- New Zealand: New Zealand National Party
- Norway: Progress Party
- Philippines: Liberal Party (factions), Laban ng Demokratikong Pilipino
- Poland: Civic Coalition
- Portugal: Social Democratic Party
- Romania: National Liberal Party
- Russia: Democratic Choice
- Serbia: People's Party
- Slovakia: Freedom and Solidarity
- Slovenia: Slovenian Democratic Party
- South Africa: Democratic Alliance
- South Korea: Minsaeng Party, Democratic Party of Korea (factions)
- Spain: People's Party, Catalan European Democratic Party, Basque Nationalist Party
- Switzerland: FDP.The Liberals
- Sweden: Liberals
- Thailand: Democrat Party
- Turkey: Good Party
- Ukraine: Civil Position
- United Kingdom: Conservative Party
- United States: Republican Party, Democratic Party (certain individuals, such as John Fetterman), Independents

=== Historical parties ===
- Austria: Constitutional Party, Federation of Independents, Freedom Party of Austria
- Belarus: Belarusian Peasant Party
- Belgium: People's Party
- Brazil: National Democratic Union
- Canada: Liberal-Conservative Party, BC United
- Chile: National Party
- Czech Republic: Civic Democratic Alliance, Public Affairs
- El Salvador: National Coalition Party
- France: Feuillant, Thermidorians, Doctrinaires, Resistance Party, Union for the New Republic/Union of Democrats for the Republic/Rally for the Republic, Independent Republicans/Republican Party/Liberal Democracy, Union for French Democracy Republican Party, Union for a Popular Movement, Agir
- Germany: National Liberal Party, German People's Party
- Iceland: Liberal Party (1927), Liberal Party (1998)
- Ireland: Progressive Democrats
- Israel: General Zionists, Liberal Party
- Italy: Italian Liberal Party, Italian Liberal Right, Forza Italia, Civic Choice
- Japan: New Party Sakigake
- Latvia: Latvian Way, Latvia's First Party/Latvian Way
- Lithuania: National Resurrection Party, Liberal and Centre Union
- Mexico: Liberal Party
- Netherlands: Liberal State Party, Party of Freedom
- New Zealand: United Party
- Norway: Frisinnede Venstre
- Poland: Liberty, League of the Right of the Republic, Liberal Democratic Congress, Poland Together
- Romania: Democratic Liberal Party, Liberal Reformist Party
- Russia: Democratic Choice of Russia
- Serbia: Serbian Progressive Party
- Slovakia: Democratic Party
- South Korea: Korea Democratic Party, Democratic Nationalist Party, Democratic Party (1955), New Democratic Party, Reunification Democratic Party, Democratic Party (1990), United Democratic Party (1995), National Congress for New Politics, Democratic Party (South Korea, 2000), People Party (2016), Party for Democracy and Peace, New Alternatives
- Spain: Liberal Party, Democratic Convergence of Catalonia
- Switzerland: Free Democratic Party, Liberal Party
- Turkey: Motherland Party
- United Kingdom: Whigs, Liberal Unionist Party, National Liberal Party
- United States: Whig Party

== See also ==
- Liberal conservatism
- Libertarian conservatism
- Muscular liberalism
- Ordoliberalism

== Bibliography ==
- Slomp, Hans (2011). Europe, a Political Profile: An American Companion to European Politics. ABC-CLIO. ISBN 978-0313391828.
- Dyson, Kenneth (2021). Conservative Liberalism, Ordo-liberalism, and the State: Discipling Democracy and the Market. Oxford University Press. ISBN 978-0-19-885428-9.
