= Lee Sang-don =

South Korean academic

- 이상돈

Member of the National Assembly
- Incumbent
- Assumed office 30 May 2016
- Constituency: Proportional representation

Personal details
- Born: 4 December 1951 (age 74) Busan, South Korea
- Party: Independent
- Education: Seoul National University; Tulane University
- Profession: legal scholar, activist, politician
- Website: Official Website

- Lee Sang-don
- Hangul: 이상돈
- Hanja: 李相敦
- RR: I Sangdon
- MR: I Sangdon

Lee Sang-don (born December 4, 1951) is a South Korean legal scholar and a conservative liberal political activist. His liberal philosophy was influenced by American conservatism and neoconservatism, but he is critical of South Korean conservatism. He currently works as a professor at Chung-Ang University. He is a conservative pundit well known for expressing criticisms towards the Lee Myung-bak government. He received criticisms from a group of pro-Lee Myung-bak lawmakers for participating in the restructure of the Saenuri Party (formally Grand National Party) in the past due to his distance with Lee Myung-bak.

He was a member of the National Assembly member of the People's Party, a liberal political party led by Ahn Cheol-soo.

== Early life ==
Sang-don was born in Busan. He graduated in Seoul National University with a B.A. and M.A. in law and later received his PhD from Tulane University in law.

== Remarks ==
=== On Lee Myung-bak ===
- He is critical against the real estate cover-ups made by the South Korean president, Lee Myung-bak, in Naegok-dong, Seocho-gu, Seoul.
- He had expressed concerns through his blog how Lee Myung-bak's political associates could potentially drag down the Lee Myung-bak government and his affiliated Saenuri Party (then Grand National Party) after the next presidential election due to Lee's extensive history of political corruptions.

=== On the Supreme Prosecutors' Office ===
- He proposed an extensive restructure of the Supreme Prosecutors' Office of the Republic of Korea as the organization itself covers up the corruptions generated by officials in the Lee Myung-bak government.

== Incidents ==
On April 4, 2012, Lee abruptly left a live political debate program shown in tvN Asia that generated controversies.

== Works ==
- Lee, Sang-don, 세계의 트렌드를 읽는 100권의 책, 기파랑 (2006), ISBN 978-89-91965-94-2
- Lee, Sang-don, 비판적 환경주의자, 브레인북스 (2006), ISBN 978-89-92447-01-0
- Lee, Sang-don, 위기에 처한 대한민국, 경덕출판사 (2007), ISBN 978-89-91197-43-5
- Lee, Sang-don, 조용한 혁명, 뷰스 (2011), ISBN 978-89-92037-76-1

== See also ==
- Liberalism in South Korea
- William F. Buckley Jr.
- Neoconservatism
