= People Party (South Korea, 2020) =

2020–2022 political party in South Korea

People Party 국민의당
- Leader: Ahn Cheol-soo
- Floor Leader: Kwon Eun-hee
- Secretary-General: Choi Yeon-sook
- Chair of the Policy Planning Committee: Hong Sung-pil
- Registered: 23 February 2020
- Dissolved: 18 April 2022
- Split from: Bareunmirae Party
- Merged into: People Power
- Ideology: Liberalism (South Korean); Conservatism (South Korean); Centrist reformism
- Political position: Centre to centre-right
- Colours: Orange; Navy blue
- Slogan: A smaller but larger party Shared party Innovation party!

Website
- peopleparty.kr (Archive)

Korean name
- Hangul: 국민의당
- Hanja: 國民의黨
- RR: Gungminui dang
- MR: Kungminŭi tang

The People Party (PP; Korean: 국민의당, lit. 'Party of Nationals') was a political party in South Korea. The party was founded by Ahn Cheol-soo in February 2020, after leaving the Bareunmirae Party. It has the same name as the People Party, which was also founded by Ahn and existed from 2016 to 2018.

In the 2020 South Korean legislative election, the party won three representatives for the National Assembly.

The People Party dissolved in April 2022 after merging with the conservative People Power Party.

== Political positions ==
The party was the successor of the liberal People Party in 2018, but had become more economically liberal overall. People Party is described as a liberal and conservative party.

People Party had somewhat more moderate liberal social positions than the previous old People Party, but it is not free from social conservatism. Ahn Cheol-soo, a key figure of the party, has expressed a negative stance on Seoul's LGBT Pride parade event, called "kwieo-chukje" (Korean: 퀴어 축제; Hanja: 퀴어 祝祭; lit. 'Queer Festival') in Gwanghwamun, Seoul. However, PP did not consistently stress a social conservative stance because it wished to present an image of "alternative politics," and to that end also criticized the conservative PPP in addition to the left-liberal DPK, which are the two "huge political parties" (Korean: 거대 양당; Hanja: 巨大兩黨). Ahn had criticized both Yoon Seok-youl of the PPP as well as Lee Jae-myung of the DPK for putting too much emphasis on men in their 20s and promoting misogyny.

== Merger and dissolution ==
On 18 April 2022, party leader Ahn Cheol-soo agreed with a merger with the mainstream conservative People Power Party. This came after Ahn withdrew from the March 2022 Presidential Election in favor of endorsing Yoon Seok-youl for President. Yoon won the election by a narrow margin of 0.7%.

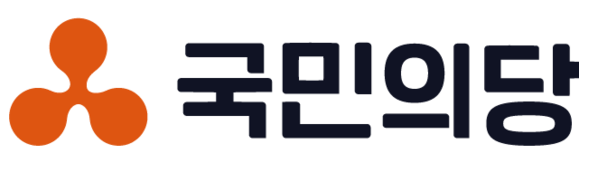
Horizontal version of the People Party logo

Parliamentary leader for the People Party, Kwon Eun-hee, rejected the merger idea. She stated "I cannot accept the idea of the merger when it only helps to entrench further the nation's political system, which is led primarily by the two major parties, thereby limiting the voices of minor parties." Kwon has requested a release from the Party and from the party unification plans so that she can keep her seat as an independent proportional representative lawmaker in the National Assembly.

== Electoral results ==
Election	Leader	Constituency			Party list			Seats	Position	Status
Election	Leader	Votes	%	Seats	Votes	%	Seats	Seats	Position	Status
2020	Ahn Cheol-soo				1,896,719	6.80	3 / 47	3 / 300	4th	Opposition

== See also ==
- Centrist reformism
- Liberalism in South Korea
- Conservatism in South Korea
- Radical centrism
- Fiscal conservatism
