= New Alternative Party (South Korea) =

2019–2020 political party in South Korea

New Alternatives Party 대안신당
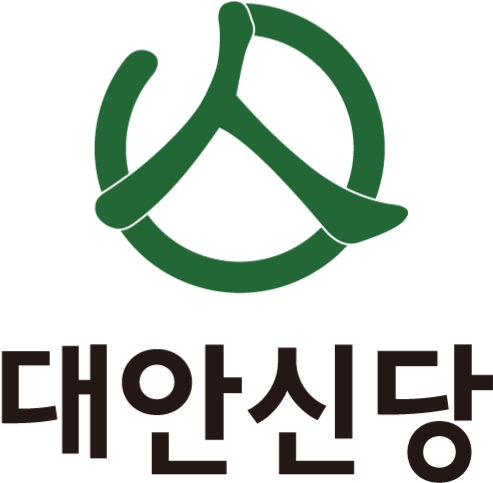
- Leader: Choi Gyung-hwan
- Founded: 16 July 2019 (within PDP); 12 August 2019 (split from PDP)
- Registered: 17 November 2019
- Dissolved: 24 February 2020
- Split from: Party for Democracy and Peace
- Merged into: Minsaeng Party
- Ideology: Conservative liberalism; Centrist reformism; Regionalism
- Political position: Centre to centre-right
- Colours: Green

The New Alternatives Party (Korean: 대안신당, romanized: Daean Sindang) was a South Korean political party founded in 2020.

== History ==
The New Alternatives Party was originally organised by the conservative dissidents of the Party for Democracy and Peace (PDP) on 16 July 2019, as the Alternative Political Alliance of Change and Hope (Korean: 변화와 희망의 대안정치연대). It was initially a part of PDP, but then split from PDP on 12 August.

It was refounded as a preparatory committee on 17 November, with the current name. It contains 8 MPs but one of them (Chang Jung-sook) is a PR of Bareunmirae Party who would like to exit. Lee Yong-joo and Chung In-hwa was excluded.

On 12 January 2020, it held the official formation convention and elected Choi Gyung-hwan as its president.

It planned to be the largest party in the 2020 election. However, on 24 February 2020, it was merged into the Minsaeng Party.

== Ideology ==
The New Alternatives Party described themselves as of the "third position" and was willing to refuse both "fake conservatives" and "fake progressives". Nevertheless, its former chairman, Yu Sung-yup, is economically liberal, opposes Keynesian economic policy and minimum wages, and advocates tax reductions. Another member, Lee Yoon-suk, a former MP, opposes same-sex marriage and Islam.

The party adopted the "5 manifestos", which supports:

- the abolition of conscription; change to volunteer military system
- to reform the labour market and put restraints on public spending
- the equal opportunity for all people regardless of birthplace, age, gender, and/or disability
- a semi-presidential system
- the abolition of the Ministry of Education; replace it with the National Education Committee
