= Ahn Cheol-soo =

South Korean politician (born 1962)

The Honourable Ahn Cheol-soo MP
- 안철수
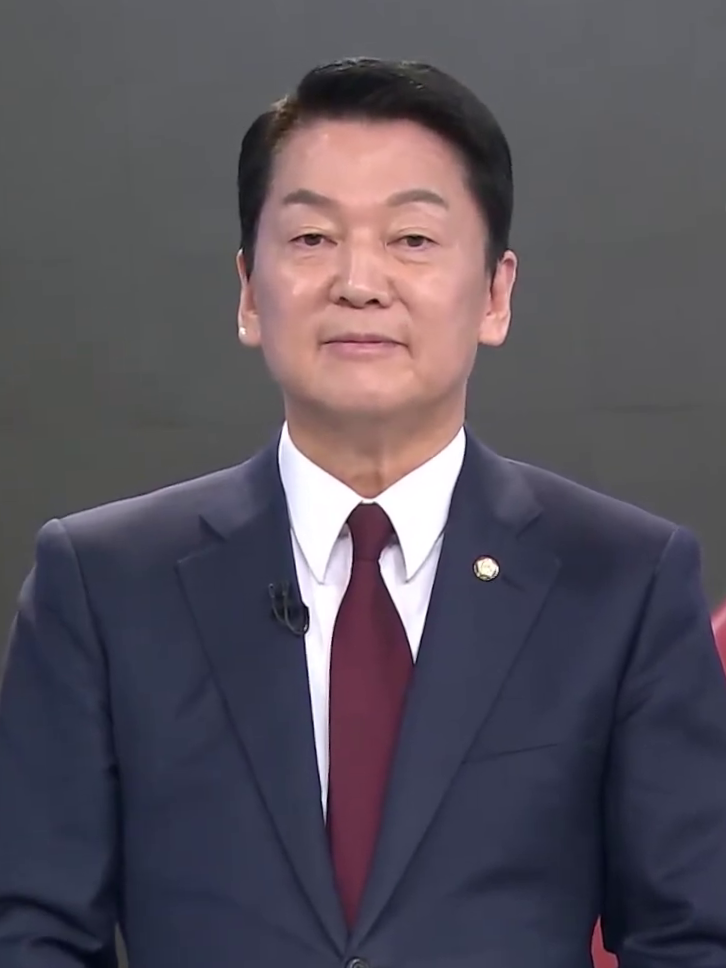
- Ahn in 2025

Member of the National Assembly
- Incumbent
- Assumed office 1 June 2022
- Preceded by: Kim Eun-hye
- Constituency: Seongnam Bundang A (Gyeonggi)
- In office 25 April 2013 – 15 April 2017
- Preceded by: Roh Hoe-chan
- Succeeded by: Kim Sung-whan (2018)
- Constituency: Nowon C (Seoul)

Leader of the New Politics Alliance for Democracy
- In office 26 March 2014 – 31 July 2014 Serving with Kim Han-gil
- Preceded by: Position established
- Succeeded by: Park Young-sun (ERC); Moon Hee-sang (acting); Moon Jae-in

Leader of the People Party (2016–2018)
- In office 2 February 2016 – 29 June 2016 Serving with Chun Jung-bae
- Preceded by: Position established
- Succeeded by: Park Jie-won (Interim); Kim Dong-cheol (Interim); Park Jie-won
- In office 27 August 2017 – 13 February 2018
- Preceded by: Park Jie-won; Joo Seung-yong (acting); Park Joo-sun (Interim)
- Succeeded by: Position abolished

Leader of the People Party (2020–2022)
- In office 23 February 2020 – 3 May 2022
- Preceded by: Position established
- Succeeded by: Position abolished

Personal details
- Born: 26 February 1962 (age 64) Busanjin Busan, South Korea
- Party: People Power (since 2022)
- Other political affiliations: Independent (2011–2014, 2015–2016, 2020); NPAD (2014–2015); People's (2016) (2016–2018); Bareunmirae (2018–2020); People's (2020) (2020–2022)
- Spouse: Kim Mi-kyung
- Children: 1
- Education: Seoul National University (MD, MS, PhD); University of Pennsylvania (MS, MBA)
- Occupation: Physician; professor; software entrepreneur
- Known for: V3 (antivirus software)
- Religion: Roman Catholic (Christian name: Paul Chong Hasang)

Military service
- Allegiance: South Korea
- Branch/service: Republic of Korea Navy
- Years of service: 1992–1994
- Rank: Daewi (Lieutenant)

Korean name
- Hangul: 안철수
- Hanja: 安哲秀
- RR: An Cheolsu
- MR: An Ch'ŏlsu
- IPA: [an tɕʰʌl.s͈u]

Ahn Cheol-soo (Korean: 안철수; pronounced [an tɕʰʌl.s͈u]; born 26 February 1962) is a South Korean politician, medical doctor, businessperson, and software entrepreneur. He is a member of the National Assembly as part of the conservative People Power Party. Prior to his career in politics, Ahn founded AhnLab, Inc., an antivirus software company, in 1995. He was chairman of the board and Chief Learning Officer of AhnLab until September 2012, and remains the company's largest stakeholder. Prior to entering politics, Ahn served as dean of the Graduate School of Convergence Science and Technology at Seoul National University until September 2012. Ahn was considered a left-wing politician when he entered politics in 2012, then considered a centrist politician by his 2017 presidential bid, and is now considered a right-wing politician.

Ahn made his first official entry into politics as an independent candidate in the 2012 South Korean presidential election, polling strongly before dropping out and endorsing the ultimately unsuccessful campaign of Democratic Party candidate Moon Jae-in. In the 2017 South Korean presidential election, Ahn ran as a third party candidate, losing to Moon Jae-in and winning 21.4% of the popular vote. In the 2022 South Korean presidential election, Ahn ran again as a third party candidate before dropping out of the race and endorsing People Power Party candidate Yoon Suk Yeol, who went on to win the election. Ahn also ran in the 2018 and 2021 elections for mayor of Seoul.

In 2014, Ahn became one of the co-founders and co-leaders of the New Politics Alliance for Democracy, now known as the Democratic Party of Korea, before stepping down from party leadership after a few months and then defecting from the party in 2015. In 2016, he was one of the co-founders of the centrist People Party and often served as party leader until the People Party and the Bareun Party merged to become the Bareunmirae Party in February 2018. In 2020, Ahn split from the Bareunmirae Party and created a new party, also called the People Party, which Ahn led until the People Party and the People Power Party merged in April 2022. Since April 2022, he has been a member of the conservative People Power Party.

== Early life and education ==
Ahn was born on 26 February 1962, in Busanjin, Busan, while his father was on military service there; he subsequently moved with his family to Busan, where he grew up. Ahn was not an academic child but had academic hobbies such as reading.

He received his doctor of medicine (MD), master of science (MS), and doctor of philosophy (Ph.D) degrees in physiology from Seoul National University between 1980 and 1991. He became the youngest chief of professors at Dankook University medical college at age 27, marking his first career milestone as a medical doctor. Ahn met his wife while in university.

While a graduate student pursuing his MD, Ahn grew interested in computer software as a hobby, in particular, antivirus software. He soon began working on his own antivirus software after a virus began mass infecting computers in Korea. Ahn was soon victimized by the same virus and reverse engineered the virus to erase it from his disk drive. The program he wrote to get rid of the virus was eventually called "Vaccine" which Ahn gave away for free.

== Business career ==
=== AhnLab, Inc ===
After finishing military service as a medical officer in the South Korean navy, and leaving behind his career in the medical profession, Cheol-soo went on to establish his venture company AhnLab, Inc in March 1995 after being advised by a software company official to do so. Ahn had previously attempted to distribute V3 via Samsung's brand though Samsung rejected Ahn's offer.

Ahn, not knowing how to run a business at first, struggled for the first several years. Whilst managing the company, Ahn was also attempting to get a master's degree in engineering at the University of Pennsylvania, where he graduated in 1997. Ahn eventually received a $10 million offer from US software giant, McAfee and Ahn met with John McAfee personally. McAfee was struggling to expand into South Korea due to AhnLab, Inc and wanted to purchase the company in an attempt to monopolize the anti-virus software market in South Korea. Ahn rejected the offer because, despite AhnLab struggling, selling the company would lead to widespread redundancies and might allow a foreign firm to dominate the Korean market.

In 1999, the company began to run a surplus after the CIH virus became widespread in Korea and people needed to buy V3 to protect against it. By the end of 1999, AhnLab, Inc became the second biggest computer security company in South Korea. That same year, he won the Scientist of the Year Award presented by the Korea Science Journalists Association. In the following year, he became a recipient of the NAEK Award by the National Academy of Engineering of Korea.

The same company later became the largest computer security company in South Korea, and was included in annual lists of Korea's most admired companies by Korea Management Association Consulting between 2004 and 2008. He resigned as CEO in 2005 and served as chairman of the board until 2012.

=== Later life and education ===
Ahn became an outside director of POSCO in 2005, and from 2010 to 2011 was chairman of the company.

Ahn was awarded an Executive Master of Business Administration (EMBA) degree from the Wharton School (San Francisco campus) in 2008. He then became a professor at KAIST in 2008, and later in the beginning of 2011 became the Dean of the Graduate School of Convergence Science and Technology at Seoul National University.

== Political career ==
=== Entry into politics ===
Since 2006, Ahn had been offered places in the main political parties but was constantly denied any chance to run as an independent due to opposing factions.

In early September 2011, speculation spread that Ahn would enter politics by competing in the 26 October Seoul mayoral by-election. The Democratic Party and Grand National Party attempted to recruit Ahn for the mayoral by-election though they failed due to Ahn feeling like he, and many other voters, had become disenfranchised with the main two choices. Ahn eventually made an announcement, denouncing the opposition and ruling party and saying he was not sure on his candidacy, deciding to watch the polls before making a choice though he shared the sentiment that he felt like it'd take a lot of work to help Seoul, saying "ten years of work" would be needed to help the city.

Analysts stated that if positioned as an independent, Ahn would attract a degree of support from those disaffected by mainstream political parties in the wake of corruption allegations and continuing policy failures.

Ahn's polling was higher than other potential candidates, at 35% with second place coming in at 17%. His approval rating was subsequently polled afterwards, reaching over 50%. Ahn eventually didn't run despite his positive poll ratings instead endorsing Park Won-soon who went on to win the by-election. Park's win has been attributed to Ahn's endorsement due to centrist voters moving to Park's side after the endorsement.

He alluded to standing as a presidential candidate in his 2012 book Thoughts of Ahn Cheol-Soo.

=== 2012 presidential campaign (2012) ===
On 19 September 2012, at 3 p.m. Korea Standard Time, Ahn held a press conference and announced his intention to run for the 2012 presidential election. This announcement came after months of speculation on whether or not Ahn was going to run for the presidency. The South Korean presidential election was to be held on 19 December 2012. In an address that lasted around 20 minutes, Ahn spent a considerable amount of time explaining how he came to the decision to run for President of the Republic of Korea, quoting the people he had met while exploring his candidacy, who had expressed their desire for a "new politics". Ahn at one point showed to be polling stronger than Moon Jae-in, with a few polls showing he could win against Park Geun-hye, the candidate who would go on to win the election. On 23 November 2012, at 8:20 p.m. KST, Ahn announced that he would drop out of the race, endorsing Moon Jae-in, the Democratic United Party presidential candidate.

=== National Assembly (2013–2016) ===
On 11 March 2013, Ahn announced that he would run for a seat in the National Assembly of South Korea as an independent candidate in the by-election in the district of Seoul Nowon District C. He won the election on 24 April, entering his first elected office. In May 2013, he launched a new think tank named Policy Network Tomorrow.

==== New Politics Alliance for Democracy Chairmanship (2014) ====
Having entered the Assembly, Ahn began to explore the creation of a new party, which was provisionally named the New Political Vision Party on the basis of public surveys. On 26 March 2014, however, while the party was in the process of being set up, Ahn merged his faction with the liberal Democratic Party to form the New Politics Alliance for Democracy (NPAD), becoming co-chairman of the new party alongside Kim Han-gil. Ahn and Kim both resigned from their position three months later in July following the new party's disappointing performance in by-elections that year, which had seen the liberals lose a seat in Jeolla Province to conservatives for the first time in 26 years.

==== Defection from the NPAD (2015) ====
Ahn remained in the NPAD, but came into increasing conflict with Moon Jae-in, who had taken over sole leadership of the party after his resignation, and the "pro-Roh" faction that Moon represented. In December 2015, Ahn issued an ultimatum to Moon demanding that a convention be held at the beginning of 2016 to elect a new party leader. Moon rejected the demand. Ahn then left the NPAD along with a range of other lawmakers opposed to Moon, including Kim Han-gil. Announcing that he would form a new party, he subsequently joined forces with Chun Jung-bae, who had left the party earlier in the year, to form the People Party in January 2016. Moon resigned as leader after Ahn's defection, describing his experience as "a series of difficult days without a single one of respite".

=== First People Party (2016–2018) ===
Ahn positioned the new People Party as an anti-establishment centrist force, attracting support from both political wings. He labeled the remaining NPAD "anachronistic progressives", and accused contemporary Korean politicians of lacking policies beyond "short-term gimmicks". In the lead-up to the 13 April parliamentary election, he came into conflict with his co-leader Chun and other members of the party after Kim Chong-in, the interim leader of the Democratic Party, the NPAD's successor, called for the two parties to form an electoral alliance. Kim Han-gil and Ahn's co-leader Chun both supported the plan, but Ahn rejected any prospect of an alliance with his former party. The proposal was ultimately scotched, with Kim Han-gil withdrawing from the upcoming election in protest.

In the event, the People Party performed better than anticipated, coming second in party-list voting and winning 38 seats overall, including 23 of the 28 districts in the liberal stronghold of Jeolla. The People Party held the balance of power in the new Assembly, establishing a three-party system. Ahn was credited for the victory, which was seen as giving him a position as kingmaker and support for contesting the presidential elections in the following year. Following the election, Ahn rejected continued calls to regroup with the Minjoo Party, stating that "it would be inappropriate to speak of politically realigning at this point in time". He added that the People Party would not be "a mere tie-breaking third party, but ... a new opinion leader in parliamentary affairs".

==== 2017 presidential campaign and defeat (2017) ====
Ahn was widely known to be a likely contender for the 2017 South Korean presidential election. He was selected as the People Party's nominee, defeating Sohn Hak-kyu and Park Joo-sun. Despite rapid increase in opinion polling which briefly bypassed Moon Jae-In, Ahn floundered in TV debates that led to his loss finishing third in a field of five total candidates.

==== Return of party chairmanship (2017–2018) ====
The underperformance of his presidential campaign and a party scandal that found People Party members fabricating evidence to smear Moon Jae-in's campaign led Ahn to declare in July 2017 to both apologize and take a step back from politics in "self-reflection." He returned a month later to run, and later win, the party chairmanship.

=== Bareunmirae Party (2018–2020) ===
As head of the People Party, Ahn was a strong advocate for merging with the center-right Bareun Party. The two leaders of the respective parties, Ahn and former presidential contender Yoo Seung-min, pushed forward with the merger which was completed in February 2018. The two parties merged to form the Bareunmirae Party in 2018.

Although Yoo retained a leadership position within the new party and Ahn stepped down from any leadership role, as of March 2018 took on the role of leading the party's talent recruiting committee - a formal position speculated to signal his preparation to run for the Seoul mayorship later in the year.

==== Hiatus (2018–2020) ====
After losing the race to become Mayor of Seoul in June, Ahn began a hiatus in his political career starting in September 2018 when he moved to Germany to study. Afterwards, he moved to the United States. Ahn would later say that his time observing political systems in Europe would influence his views on domestic political reform.

=== Second People Party (2020–2022) ===
On 29 January 2020, Ahn founded the People Party (not to be confused with the earlier party of the same name founded by Ahn in 2016 or the People Power Party) as a splinter group from the Bareunmirae Party. Ahn cited disagreement with party leader Sohn Hak-kyu as his reason for leaving. This announcement came weeks after the official defection of eight lawmakers, including Yoo Seong-min, to the New Conservative Party on 5 January 2020. The Bareunmirae Party dissolved shortly thereafter on 24 February 2020.

The People Party was officially registered on 23 February 2020. Ahn has continued to act as its leader since its founding.

On 1 March 2020, he was reported that he was carrying out COVID-19 medical service in Daegu with his wife Kim Mi-kyung. Ahn was able to treat patients because he had continued to maintain his doctor's medical license.

On 1 April 2020, he started the "Chunri-gil National Territory Master," a 14-day cross country marathon that covered a total of 400 kilometers.

==== Seoul mayoral campaign (2021) ====
In December 2020, it was reported that Ahn intended to run again in the upcoming 2021 by-election to become mayor of Seoul. Ahn officially registered as a candidate, but after he lost to Oh Se-hoon in an opinion poll, Ahn conceded and withdrew in an effort to unify the opposition camp. Oh Se-hoon would go on to win the 2021 Seoul mayoral by-election.

==== 2022 presidential campaign (2021–2022) ====
Before announcing his presidential bid in the 2022 presidential election, Ahn held negotiations with the Leader of the People Power Party Lee Jun-seok for a prospective merger between the People Party and the People Power Party. The People Power Party was at the time the main South Korean conservative party. These negotiations ended unsuccessfully in August 2021 due to disagreements on party-level issues such as Ahn's desire for the PPP to change its name to the People Party and method of picking a 2022 candidate.

On 1 November 2021, Ahn Cheol-soo announced his candidacy in the 2022 presidential election. The People Party's Central Party Election Planning Group stated it would receive applications for other presidential candidates for two days following Ahn's announcement, but it was considered merely a formality and extremely likely Ahn would be the People Party's presidential candidate.

On 4 November, Ahn was chosen as the People Party nominee with 92% of the vote, and he accepted the nomination.

On 3 March 2022, six days before the presidential election, Ahn dropped out of the 2022 presidential race. Ahn had been polling at around 10% support before dropping out of the race. Ahn endorsed PPP candidate Yoon Suk Yeol for president, who would narrowly win the election.

On 18 April, Ahn announced the merger of the People Party into the People Power Party in a joint press conference with PPP head Lee Jun-seok. The People Party was thereby dissolved.

=== People Power Party (2022–present) ===
==== National Assembly (2022–) ====
Upon the People Power Party-People Party merger on 18 April 2022, Ahn became a member of the People Power Party.

On 8 May 2022, Ahn declared his bid in the June 2022 South Korean by-elections, running for the Seongnam Bundang District A vacant seat in the National Assembly. He won the seat on 1 June 2022 with 62.5% of the votes.

==== 2023 Leadership Election ====
In 2023, Ahn declared his intention to run for the leadership of the People Power Party. Despite unifying with Yoon during the presidential election a year ago, the Presidential Office strongly criticized Ahn during the campaign period. He lost to Kim Gi-hyeon, placing in second place with 23.37% of the votes.

==== 2024 martial law and impeachment of Yoon ====
Ahn was notable as the only PPP legislator to stay in the building after every other Assembly member walked out before the impeachment of President Yoon Suk Yeol. This comes after Ahn and Yoon had sparred several times previously, partly owing to Ahn's moderate politics and Yoon's conservative outlook. He called on Yoon to step down previously, and stated he would vote for impeachment unless Yoon resigned no matter his affiliation. Only Ahn and Kim Ye-ji voted in favor of impeachment, with Kim returning later to the chamber to vote. Kim Sang-wook returned to the chamber to vote, but said he voted against impeachment. Ahn, who said he was criticized by the party for his vote, said that "The idea that a president responsible for upholding the constitution of the world's 10th largest economy would stage an unconstitutional coup is beyond imagination".

==== 2025 presidential campaign ====
"If you don't want to make Lee Jae-myung president, which you fear the most, you need to open your hearts."

- Ahn Cheol-soo during the PPP primary

Four days after former President Yoon Suk Yeol was removed from office by the Constitutional Court, Ahn declared his candidacy to run in the snap 2025 presidential election on 8 April in Gwanghwamun Square. Ahn said that he chose the square, which features a statue of Admiral Yi Sun-sin, as the location for his candidacy declaration because it serves as "the center and a symbol of national unity." He described Lee Jae-myung, the leader and presumptive nominee of the opposition Democratic Party, as the 'weakest opponent' he could face. He expressed support for National Assembly Speaker Woo Won-sik's (also of the Democratic Party) proposal for constitutional amendment referendum that would strengthen the power of the legislature, but also questioned whether it would be logistically possible to hold such a referendum simultaneously with the presidential election; Ahn proposed holding the referendum the following year instead. He called for unity within the PPP, encouraging party members to move past Yoon's impeachment.

Ahn said he offered broad moderate appeal, touting his personal character and diverse career experience during the primary campaign. On 12 April, Ahn announced his campaign's ten 'major pledges' which included pension reform, expanding housing welfare, securing energy sovereignty, and strengthening South Korea's alliance with the United States amidst the second Trump administration.

Ahn advised acting President Han Duck-soo not to run for President. He said his run was motivated by "a sense of crisis" he had felt and the emergence of cutting-edge technologies related to artificial intelligence. Ahn has claimed that PPP candidates who did not support Yoon's impeachment could not win the election, believing that he is the only candidate who could defeat a member of the opposition party. He also said his main campaign pledge, were he to secure the PPP's nomination, would be to amend the constitution to reduce the power of both the Presidency and the National Assembly; he has advocated for reducing the presidential term from five years to four or three.

On 18 April, he urged Yoon Suk Yeol to leave the party, reiterating that it would show the party's ability to take responsibility for the martial law incident.

On 29 April, Ahn lost in the penultimate primaries held by the People Power Party.

== Political positions ==
=== Centrism ===
Ahn's foreign policy proposals are roughly similar to that of South Korean conservatives: he calls for a tougher approach towards North Korea, and supports the THAAD system (although initially opposed to it). In September 2012, Ahn visited the graves of Syngman Rhee, Park Chung Hee, and Kim Dae-jung. Park and Rhee are often praised by Korean conservatives, and Kim by liberals. Ahn stated at the time that it would be "hypocritical to paint half the people as enemies and at the same time call for 'unity'". Ahn has been considered "more palatable for conservative voters" in part due to his business background. He has said that, if elected President, he would work with opposition lawmakers and form personal relationships, citing inspiration from how President Barack Obama negotiated with the opposition Republican Party in the United States.

=== National security (THAAD) ===
Ahn was among the first who opposed the American deployment of the Terminal High Altitude Area Defense system, commonly referred to as THAAD, alongside Moon Jae-in. However, he changed his stance suggesting it was "irresponsible" for any future president to reverse an agreement already made between the United States and Korea.

=== LGBT rights ===
Ahn has stated he opposes the legalization of same-sex marriage, although in a more detailed article on broadcasting network SBS' website, he said that same-sex marriage needs to be achieved through social discussion. Asked whether he was willing to attend the Queer Parade, he answered to the effect that "the right to refuse should also be respected."

== Philanthropy ==
In December 2011, Ahn has expressed his willingness to donate half of his shares in AhnLab for the education of children from low-income families. He owns 37.1 percent of AhnLab shares, and as of 9 December 2011, the value of the shares to be donated is about 250 billion won ($218 million).

== Personal life ==
In 1988 Ahn married Kim Mi-kyung, who is currently a professor at the Seoul National University College of Medicine. They live in Seongnam, and have a daughter.

Ahn competes in marathons, and has participated in the Seoul International Marathon six times, as of 2025.

=== Legal issues ===
In September 2012, Ahn made a public apology as reports surfaced that his wife evaded taxes by under-pricing a 2001 apartment she bought worth ₩450 million to ₩250 million, thus reducing the acquisition and registration taxes by up to ₩10 million. However, a statement by the Korea Taxpayers' Association claimed that the "down contract" was in accordance with trade customs and thus not unlawful due to flaws in the local tax law between 1996 and 2005.

== Election results ==
Year	Elections	Constituency	Political party	Votes (%)	Results
2013	2013 By-election	Nowon C (Seoul)	Independent	42,581 (60.46%)	Won
2016	20th National Assembly General Election	Nowon C (Seoul)	People's (2016)	53,930 (52.33%)	Won
2017	2017 Presidential Election	South Korea	People's (2016)	6,998,342 (21.41%)	Defeated (3rd)
2018	7th Local Election	Seoul (Mayoral Elections)	Bareunmirae	970,374 (19.55%)	Defeated (3rd)
2021	2021 By-election	Seoul (Mayoral Elections)	People's (2020)	–	Resigned
2022	2022 Presidential Election	South Korea	People's (2020)	–	Resigned
2022	June 2022 By-election	Seongnam Bundang A (Gyeonggi)	People Power	83,747 (62.50%)	Won
2024	22nd National Assembly General Election	Seongnam Bundang A (Gyeonggi)	People Power	87,315 (53.27%)	Won

== Bibliography ==
- 2012. Thought of Ahn Cheol-Soo (안철수의 생각). 김영사. 276 pages. ISBN 9788934958710
- 2009. Happy Virus by Ahn Cheol-soo (행복 바이러스 안철수: 안철수 박사가 쓴 안철수 이야기). 리젬. 136 pages. ISBN 9788992826259.
- 2009. My Mother Who Fostered My Ability (재능을 키워 준 나의 어머니). Jaeneung Academy. 143 pages. ISBN 9788976492456.
- 2007. My Turning Point (내 인생의 결정적 순간: 그 순간이 없었으면 지금의 나는 없다). IMAGE Box. 247 pages. ISBN 9788991684348.
- 2004. What We Need (CEO 안철수, 지금 우리에게 필요한 것은). KimYoung. 259 pages. ISBN 8934917202.
- 2003. My Choice (나의 선택: 무엇이든지 하고 싶지만 쉽게 결단을 내리지 못하는 젊음에게). JeongEum. 231 pages. ISBN 8990164192.
- 2001. Spiritual Showdown (CEO 안철수, 영혼이 있는 승부). KimYoung. 291 pages. ISBN 8934907525.
- 2000. Ahn's Internet Shortcut (안철수의 인터넷 지름길). BookMark. 396 pages. ISBN 8988351142.
- 1997. Ahn's Protection and Healing Computer Virus (안철수의 바이러스 예방과 치료). Information Age. 222 pages. ISBN 8985346865.
- 1996. Analysing Computer Virus and Making Antivirus Software (바이러스 분석과 백신 제작). Information Age. 391 pages. ISBN 8985346180.
- 1995. Eccentric Computer Doctor, Ahn Cheol-soo (별난 컴퓨터 의사 안철수). Vision. 336 pages. ISBN 8985456148.
- 1995. Learning Computer Easily (컴퓨터, 참 쉽네요!). Youngjin. 396 pages. ISBN 8931406509.

== See also ==
- Moderate conservatism

National Assembly of the Republic of Korea
Preceded by Roh Hoe-chan	Member of the National Assembly from Nowon District C (Seoul); 25 April 2013–17 April 2017	Succeeded by Kim Sung-whan
Preceded by Kim Eun-hye	Member of the National Assembly from Seongnam City Bundang District A (Gyeonggi); 2 June 2022–present	Incumbent
Party political offices
Preceded by New Office	Co-Leader of the New Politics Alliance for Democracy (With Kim Han-gil); 26 March 2014–31 July 2014	Succeeded by Park Young-sun (ERC); Moon Hee-sang (Interim); Moon Jae-in
Preceded by New Office	Co-Leader Of the People's Party (2016) (With Chun Jung-bae); 2 February 2016–29 June 2016	Succeeded by Park Jie-won (Interim); Kim Dong-cheol (Interim); Park Jie-won
Preceded by Park Jie-won; Joo Seung-ryong (Acting); Park Joo-sun (Interim)	Leader of the People's Party (2016); 27 August 2017–13 February 2018	Succeeded by Office abolished
Preceded by New Office	Leader of the People's Party (2020); 23 February 2020–3 May 2022	Succeeded by Office abolished
Preceded by New Office	People's Party (2016), People's Party (2020) nominee for President of South Korea; 2017, 2022	Succeeded by Office abolished
