= Party for Democracy and Peace =

2018–2020 political party in South Korea

- Founded: 6 February 2018 (de facto); 7 February 2018 (de jure)
- Dissolved: February 2020
- Split from: People
- Merged into: Minsaeng Party
- Ideology: Liberalism (South Korean); Conservative liberalism; Regionalism; Centrist reformism
- Political position: Centre

Website
- peaceparty.co.kr (Archive)
- Politics of South Korea; Political parties; Elections; A: It is also sometimes rated as centre-left or centre-right. And the Party for Democracy and Peace is sometimes described as a conservative party and has a more social conservative tendency than the Liberty Korea Party.

- Party for Democracy and Peace
- Hangul: 민주평화당
- Hanja: 民主平和黨
- RR: Minju pyeonghwadang
- MR: Minju p'yŏnghwadang

The Party for Democracy and Peace (Korean: 민주평화당, sometimes translated as the Democratic Peace Party) was a liberal political party in South Korea. The name "Democratic Peace Party" is known to have been named by Lee Sang-don (이상돈), a conservative liberal in South Korea.

== History ==
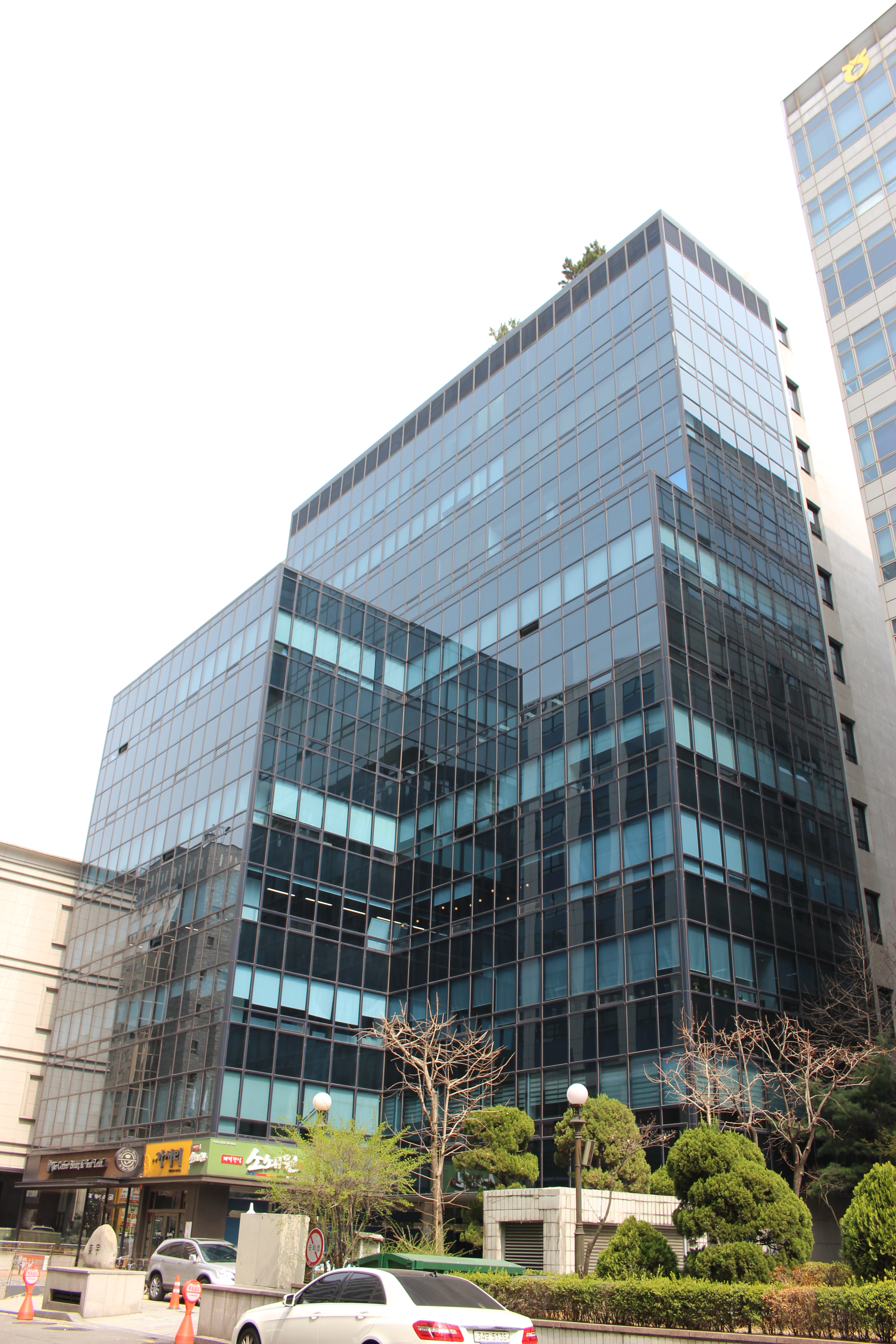
Headquarters of Party for Democracy and Peace

The party was founded by People Party dissidents who were in a faction that was closely associated with late former President Kim Dae-jung.

Plans for the new party came about following a decision by People Party leader Ahn Cheol-soo and Bareun Party leader Yoo Seong-min to merge their respective parties in January 2018 that would go onto form the Bareunmirae Party. The initial announcement was called "hasty" for being presented before votes were cast among each respective parties' members. This plan for merging the centrist People Party with the centre-right Bareun Party faced opposition within the People Party, especially with lawmakers from North and South Jeolla which noted to be liberal-leaning provinces.

On 28 January, sixteen lawmakers from the People Party, including former floor leader and party leader Park Jie-won as well as Chung Dong-young announced their plans to form what is now the Party for Democracy and Peace.

The party formerly formed a parliamentary group with the Justice Party called the Lawmakers for Peace and Justice. The parliamentary group was disbanded after the death of Roh Hoe-chan, an MP from Justice Party.

On 12 August 2019, two-thirds of the members of Parliament for the Party for Democracy and Peace stated that they will be leaving the Party and starting new. "The Party for Democracy and Peace was launched to solidify the identity of the democracy group that succeeded the spirit of the Gwangju Uprising, and to restore the pride of the peace group to develop the Sunshine Policy. But for the past year and a half we have failed to meet the public's expectations and desire," said party Floor Leader You Sung-yop during a press conference at the National Assembly.

== Political position ==
The PDP is a party led by the "pro-Kim Dae-jung" forces (who led the Millennium Democratic Party, a conservative liberal party). During the administration of Roh Moo-hyun, the Party for Democracy and Peace and the Democratic Party used to be united as the Uri Party. During that time, both Lee Hae-chan (incumbent leader of DP) and Chung Dong-young (incumbent leader of PDP) were in the same party and cabinet.

In social policy, the party tends to be more conservative than Democratic Party. The party opposes same-sex marriages and abortion. Especially on the abortion issue, the party is more conservative than the Liberty Korea Party. Because of this socially conservative tendency, some media have classified Party for Democracy and Peace as conservative parties along with the Bareunmirae Party and Liberty Korea Party.

== Electoral results ==
Election	Leader	Metropolitan mayor/Governor	Provincial legislature	Municipal mayor	Municipal legislature
2018	Cho Bae-sook	0 / 17	3 / 824	5 / 226	48 / 2,927

== See also ==
- Fiscal conservatism
- People Party (South Korea, 2016)
- Blue Dog Coalition
- Liberalism in South Korea
