= Party for Democracy and Peace (2025) =

Party for Democracy and Peace 민주평화당
- Leader: Nam Il (ERC)
- Secretary-General: Kim Chang-wan
- Founded: 24 February 2020; 19 March 2024 (Note: as Gihuminsaeng Party); 17 April 2025 (Note: as Party for Democracy and Peace)
- Merger of: Bareunmirae; New Alternatives; Democracy and Peace
- Ideology: Centrist reformism; Conservative liberalism; Regionalism
- Political position: Centre to centre-right
- Colours: Green
- National Assembly: 0 / 300
- Metropolitan Mayors and Governors: 0 / 16
- Municipal Mayors: 0 / 227
- Provincial and Metropolitan Councillors: 0 / 933
- Municipal Councillors: 0 / 3,034

Website
- www.mpeaceparty.kr

Korean name
- Hangul: 민주평화당
- Hanja: 民主平和党
- RR: Minju pyeonghwadang
- MR: Minju p'yŏnghwadang

Minsaeng Party
- Hangul: 민생당
- Hanja: 民生黨
- RR: Minsaengdang
- MR: Minsaengdang

Gihuminsaeng Party
- Hangul: 기후민생당
- Hanja: 氣候民生黨
- RR: Gihuminsaengdang
- MR: Kihuminsaengdang

The Party for Democracy and Peace (Korean: 민주평화당; lit. 'Democracy Peace Party'), formerly known as the Minsaeng Party (Korean: 민생당; lit. 'People's Livelihood Party'), is a conservative-liberal political party in South Korea based in the Honam region.

== History ==
On 14 February, the Bareunmirae Party, New Alternatives, and Party for Democracy and Peace parties agreed to merge and form a new party. Their intended name was the Democratic Unified Party (민주통합당), unveiled on 17 February, but Bareunmirae leader Sohn Hak-kyu objected. The name was scrapped the following day after the National Election Commission barred its use, citing its similarity to the extra-parliamentary United Democratic Party. The agreement was reaffirmed with the new name Minsaeng ("People's Livelihood"). The party was formally founded on 24 February 2020.

The party had twenty seats at the time of the 2020 legislative election but failed to retain any.

In the 2021 by-elections, the party President Lee Su-bong contested for the Seoul mayorship. Despite having less support than the Democratic and People Power Party candidates, he was able to appear on television debates, as the predecessor Bareunmirae Party's candidate received 19.55% of the vote in the previous mayoral election. He received 0.23% of the vote, far behind the Democratic and People Power Party candidates.

On 19 April 2021, the former party president Kim Jung-hwa made an announcement to quit the party, although she mentioned that she has no willingness to retire from politics.

On 4 May 2021, Lee Su-bong was suspended from the party for a year.

On 8 February 2024, Kim Jong-ki, the acting chairman of the DPP's emergency committee, declared the party's commitment to environmental protection and sustainable development.

On 15 March the committee suggested renaming the party to "Climate People's Democratic Party," in line with the party constitution. The Central Election Commission confirmed the name change on 19 March. Former Chairman Seo Jin-hee was elected as the new party chairman, with Lee Seung-han, Lee Jin, and Nae-hoon as supreme committee members, and Lee Ki-hyun as the National Party Congress chairman. On 20 March, Kim Jong-ki released a commentary titled "The Climate People's Party is a party that protects life, democracy, human rights, and the livelihood of ordinary people," which was disseminated via media outlets. According to a court search, an appeal was lodged following the Supreme Court's 2024 decision, case number 2024 Na 2015771. Finally, on 22 March, Seo Jin-hee was officially announced as the representative following the resolution from 19 March, and the general secretary position was declared vacant.

On 17 April 2025, the party reverted to the 2018 name, Party for Democracy and Peace, in an attempt to rebrand after party leader Seo Jin-hee was charged with adultery and violating the Political Funding Act. Seo also tried to hide the fact that she was indited on charges of wasted nearly 10 billion won (US$7 million) in political funds from party members in an effort to keep her position as leader of the Party.

== Political position ==
The party has a support base among elderly and socially conservative Christians in the Honam region. The Democratic Peace Party, a former Honam regionalist party, strongly opposed abortion, but Minsaeng Party has no official position on abortion.

On the LGBT issue, MPs expressed their opposition to same-sex marriage, but criticized some socially conservative members of the Democratic Party of Korea for hostile tendencies toward LGBT people.

== Logos ==
Logo of the Minsaeng Party

Flag of the Minsaeng Party

Logo of the Climate People's Democratic Party

Logo of the Party for Democracy and Peace (2025)

== Election results ==
| Election | Leader | Constituency | | | Party list | | | Seats | | Position | Status |
| Election | Leader | Votes | % | +/- | Votes | % | +/- | No. | +/– | Position | Status |
|---|---|---|---|---|---|---|---|---|---|---|---|
| 2020 | Kim Jung-hwa; Yu Sung-yup | 415,473 | 1.5 | new | 758,778 | 2.7 | new | 0 / 300 | new | 6th | Extra-parliamentary |
| 2024 | Kim Jung-hwa; Yu Sung-yup | 6,615 | 0.02 | | 778 | <0.01 | | 0 / 300 | 0 | | Extra-parliamentary |
