= People Party (South Korea, 2016) =

2016–2018 political party in South Korea

- Founder: Ahn Cheol-soo; Kim Han-gil
- Founded: 2 February 2016
- Dissolved: 13 February 2018
- Split from: Democratic Party of Korea
- Merged into: Bareunmirae Party
- Ideology: Liberalism (South Korean); Centrist reformism; Economic liberalism; Social conservatism
- Political position: Centre
- Colors: Dark green
- Slogan: 담대한 변화가 시작됩니다 ('Bold change is beginning!')

Website
- people21.kr (Archive)

- People Party
- Hangul: 국민의당
- Hanja: 國民의黨
- RR: Gungminui dang
- MR: Kungminŭi tang

The People Party (PP; Korean: 국민의당; lit. 'Party of Nationals') was a centrist political party from 2016 to 2018 in South Korea. The political party was established on 2 February 2016 by Ahn Cheol-soo. The party had a strong support base in the Honam region. The party dissolved on 13 February 2018.

A later party of the same name was also founded by Ahn and was active from 2020 to 2022.

== History ==
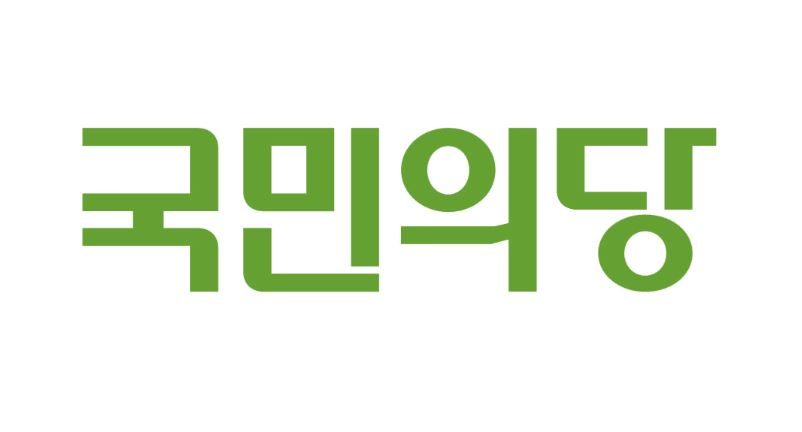
Early logo of the People Party

Plans for the party began, after Ahn Cheol-soo, who established the Democratic Party of Korea with Kim Han-gil, quit the party in mid-December 2015, after a power struggle with Moon Jae-in. At the time, Ahn vowed to create a political group that can effect government change.

Ahn unveiled the party's name in January 2016. Kim, who co-founded the Democratic Party with Ahn, joined the party a day before the name's unveiling.

The party officially launched on 2 February 2016, with 17 lawmakers in the National Assembly. In March 2016, the party gained its 20th member, a defector from the Democratic Party, which gave the party rights to form a negotiation bloc, along with higher state subsidies.

During the 2016 legislative election, the party aimed to pick up 20 seats. The party, however, ended up garnering 38 seats, including 23 of the 28 contested seats in South Korea's southwest, which is seen as a Democratic Party stronghold. Following the election, the party was seen as having a potentially deciding vote on legislation.

Ahn, however, resigned his chairmanship along with co-leader Chun Jung-bae in June of the same year, following a corruption scandal involving certain party members (see below). Ahn, however, was elected to a second stint as party chairman in August 2017, after an extended vacancy caused by Park Jie-won's resignation in May that year, following Ahn's defeat in the 2017 presidential election.

=== Merger ===
On January 18, 2018, Ahn, along with the leader of the Bareun Party, Yoo Seong-min, announced their plans to merge the two parties, in an effort to form a centrist bloc and consolidate their parliamentary standings before local elections. The announcement was noted as being "hasty", having come before the two respective parties underwent due process to confirm the union, and was seen an attempt to consolidate the plan amidst oppositions.

Within the People Party, the plan faced opposition, especially with lawmakers from the provinces of North and South Jeolla, both of which are noted to be liberal-leaning provinces.

On January 28, 16 of the party's lawmakers, including Park Jie-won and Chung Dong-young, announced plans to start a new party. The lawmakers were noted to have belonged to a faction that was closely associated with late former President Kim Dae-jung. The new party, named Party for Democracy and Peace, was launched on February 6.

The plan was approved by the Bareun Party on 5 February 2018, and was finalized by the People Party six days later.

== Controversies ==
=== Corruption allegation ===
In early June 2016, three members of the party, including two lawmakers, were accused by the National Election Commission of receiving kickbacks from the party's PR agencies, prior to elections that year. One lawmaker, Kim Su-min, was accused by prosecutors of possibly receiving ₩178 million from advertisement firms, via forged contracts. One of the members, a party official, was arrested for alleged violation of the country's Political Fund Law.

The party, however, has denied that the party itself received any of the kickbacks.

=== False accusations against Moon Jae-in ===
In July 2017, the party asked for a special prosecutor to look into allegations that the party's leadership was involved in making up evidence, as part of allegations that Moon Jae-in's son, Moon Joon-yong, received special treatment during the hiring process at a public agency. An arrest warrant was also issued against a former member of the party's Supreme Council, which was denounced by the party as being unfair.

Ahn, who ran in the presidential election that year and was noted by The Korea Herald as having stood to benefit directly from the tip-off (although he lost the election), was questioned by the party's internal investigators.

== Party leadership ==
=== Chairpersons ===
1. Ahn Cheol-soo, Chun Jung-bae (co-leaders; 2 February 2016 – 28 June 2016)
  - Park Jie-won as head of Emergency Planning Committee (30 July 2016 – 2 December 2016)
  - Kim Dong-cheol as head of Emergency Planning Committee (2 December 2016 – 15 January 2017)
2. Park Jie-won (15 January 2017 – 10 May 2017)
  - Joo Seung-yong as Interim leader (10 May 2017 – 16 May 2017)
  - Kim Dong-cheol as Interim leader (16 May 2017 – 26 May 2017)
  - Park Joo-sun as interim leader (26 May 2017 – 27 August 2017)
3. Ahn Cheol-soo (27 August 2017 – 13 February 2018)

=== Assembly leaders (Floor leaders) ===
1. Joo Seung-yong (2 February 2016 – 27 April 2016)
2. Park Jie-won (27 April 2016 – 29 December 2016)
3. Joo Seung-yong (29 December 2016 – 16 May 2017)
4. Kim Dong-cheol (16 May 2017 – 13 February 2018)

== Electoral results ==
=== President ===
| Election | Candidate | Votes | % | Result |
|---|---|---|---|---|
| 2017 | Ahn Cheol-soo | 6,998,342 | 21.41 | Not elected |

=== Legislature ===
| Election | Leader | Constituency | | | Party list | | | Seats | Position | Status |
| Election | Leader | Votes | % | Seats | Votes | % | Seats | Seats | Position | Status |
|---|---|---|---|---|---|---|---|---|---|---|
| 2016 | Ahn Cheol-soo; Chun Jung-bae | 3,565,451 | 14.85 | 25 / 253 | 6,355,572 | 26.75 | 13 / 47 | 38 / 300 | 2nd | Opposition |

== See also ==
- People Party (South Korea)
- Fiscal conservatism
- Lee Sang-don
