= Third Power (South Korea) =

2023 South Korean political group

- 세 번째 권력
- Abbreviation: 3rd Power
- Merged into: New Choice
- Formation: 15 April 2023
- Co-chairs: Ryu Ho-jeong; Cho Seong-ju; Jang Hye-young (initially)
- Affiliations: Justice Party (initially); New Choice Party
- Website: blog YouTube Facebook

Third Power (Korean: 세 번째 권력) was a South Korean political group. It was described by the media as a "political union" or "opinion group". It was launched in April 2023 by younger members of the Justice Party and was led by Justice Party lawmakers Jang Hye-young and Ryu Ho-jeong and party member Cho Seong-ju. The group argued that the Justice Party should be re-established as a new party and move beyond progressive politics to voters outside the two major parties. The group set a goal of winning 30 seats in the 2024 legislative election. In December 2023 the group announced that it would join the founding of a new party with New Choice, organised by former lawmaker Keum Tae-sup.

== Background ==
In early 2023 the Justice Party declared that it would undergo a "re-establishment" ahead of the 2024 general election. Third Power was created as a group within the party, focusing on younger voters, to push for that re-establishment to become the founding of a new party.

== Launch ==
Third Power held its launch ceremony on 15 April 2023 at the National Assembly Members' Office Building in Seoul. Jang described the group as "a movement, not an organisation".

Former People Power Party leader Lee Jun-seok and former Democratic Party emergency committee co-chair Park Ji-hyun attended the launch ceremony and gave congratulatory speeches. Both had been associated with non-mainstream factions of their parties.

In its inaugural declaration, the group said it would move beyond the politics of the "industrialisation" and "democratisation" generations to create the politics of a "democracy generation". It declared it would go beyond a labor-centred party limited to defending labor unions' immediate interests, a "de facto satellite party" of the Democratic Party, and a closed activist party. It also called for the Justice Party to reach out to voters beyond the two major parties.

== Vision presentation ==
On 27 November 2023, Third Power held a vision presentation at the National Assembly Members' Office Building. They said they aimed to win two million votes and elect more than 30 candidates in the 2024 election. Cho criticised what he called "authoritarian populism" and a resulting "vetocracy", said the Justice Party was not free from a lack of self-reflection, and said the group would explore coalition or joint-governance models to end two-party politics.

Other third-party figures attended, including Yang Hyang-ja of Hope of Korea and Keum Tae-sup of the New Choice Preparatory Committee. When asked about a proposed alliance with a new party floated by Basic Income Party lawmaker Yong Hye-in, Cho rejected it as a possible partner and said that Third Power was closer to a prospective new party led by Lee Jun-seok, possibly as that new party's "left wing".

== Merger with New Choice ==
On 8 December 2023, Keum Tae-sup and Cho announced at the National Assembly's Communication Center that New Choice and Third Power would jointly found a new party, describing it as a "third-zone" coalition of "rational progressives and reformist conservatives". Third Power would join New Choice, which had already completed its legal founding procedures, with a joint founding convention scheduled for 17 December and Keum and Cho serving as co-representatives. The convention was held on the 17 December, formally launching the New Choice.

At the announcement Ryu, who was still a Justice Party lawmaker, said she would remain in the party for the time being to persuade others to join the new party. Jang Hye-young had left Third Power on 30 November 2023 and stayed in the Justice Party. Keum said he was in discussions about an alliance with Lee Jun-seok and lawmaker Lee Sang-min, who had left the Democratic Party.

== Aftermath ==
In early 2024, Ryu Ho-jeong left the Justice Party and resigned her proportional representation seat due to her opposition to the party forming an alliance with the Green Party.

In February 2024, the New Choice party was one of four parties and organisations that agreed to merge with the Reform Party with an aim to form a new big tent ahead of the 2024 legislative election.
