= Cho Seong-ju =

South Korean politician (born 1978)

- 조성주
- Cho in 2021

Co-leader of the New Choice Party
- In office 17 December 2023 – February 2024 Serving with Keum Tae-sup
- Preceded by: office established
- Succeeded by: Jeong Ho-hee (acting) office abolished

Personal details
- Born: 28 October 1978 (age 47)
- Party: Reform Party (2024–)
- Other political affiliations: Democratic Labor Party (2003–2011); Unified Progressive Party (2011–2012); Independent (2012–2015; 2017–2021); Justice Party (2015–2017; 2021–2023); New Choice Party (2023–2024)

Cho Seong-ju (Korean: 조성주, born 28 October 1978) is a South Korean politician for the Reform Party. He is a member of a group called Political Reform 2050, a bipartisan body composed of youth politicians from ruling and opposition parties.

== Career ==
He was previously a member of the Democratic Labor Party, as well as later a member of the Unified Progressive Party.

In 2010, he participated in the founding of the "Youth Union," a labor union for young people, and served as the head of its policy planning team. He also led organisations such as the Headquarters for the Economic Democratisation Movement and the Political Power Plant, conducting research on policies related to youth and labor.

He frequently cited the American social activist Saul Alinsky (1909–1972). In June 2015, he garnered attention (securing 17.1% of the vote, or 1,266 votes) by running for the Justice Party's leadership at the age of 36, competing against figures such as Roh Hoe-chan and Sim Sang-jung. He campaigned under the slogan of "second-generation progressive politics." He declared his candidacy for the 20th National Assembly as part of the Justice Party's proportional representation primary.

He also served as the director of the Justice Party Political Development Institute.

In February 2017, he left the Justice Party and served as a labor cooperation officer at the Seoul Metropolitan Government.

In 2022 he ran again for leader of the Justice Party.

In 2023 he became co-chair of the group Third Power alongside Ryu Ho-jeong. Jang Hye-young was also initially a co-chair but she withdrew due to differences in the pace of forming the party. Cho advocated for the expansion of the third zone, the political space outside the two major parties, and co-founded the New Choice Party alongside other members of the Third Power faction. He was then elected as co-leader of the New Choice Party alongside Keum Tae-sup.

Following the merger of New Choice with Lee Jun-seok's Reform Party in February 2024, he became a member of the Reform Party.

Ahead of the 2024 South Korean legislative election, he was nominated as number 10 on the proportional representation list for the Reform Party. However, he was not elected.

== 2012 Unified Progressive Party primary rigging controversy ==
In 2012, he ran for the Youth Proportional Representation seat of the Unified Progressive Party but was defeated by candidate Kim Jae-yeon. Subsequently, when allegations of fraud in the proportional representation primary involving candidate Lee Seok-ki surfaced, he issued a joint statement with other candidates announcing that the source code of the online voting system had been accessed during the primary for youth proportional representation candidates as well. Suspicions of 'source code manipulation' were also raised, with claims that the data of the online voting system had been manipulated. However, an investigation by prosecutors revealed that the allegations of source code manipulation were groundless.

== 2016 Justice Party proportional representation candidacy ==
In an interview with Pressian while running in the Justice Party's 2016 primary for proportional representation parliamentary seats and an interview with The Hankyoreh he said that, as a Justice Party candidate, it is hard to win a constituency seat, so rather than staging a show of 'fighting' during the general election campaign, he wanted to enter the National Assembly and fight for change. After the 2015 party leadership election, he toured various regions and met with many party members; and he said many suggested that he should run for a proportional representation seat rather than running in a specific constituency. He was selected as number six on the proportional representation list but was not elected.

== Authored works ==
- Youth Diary. Kkotpinjari. 23 September 2015. ISBN 9788994103945
- Alinsky: The Politics of Change. Humanitas. 2 July 2015. ISBN 9788964372326
- You Are Me: Cheering for Jeon Tae-il in Our Time (Co-authored). Cheolsu & Younghee. 13 November 2010. ISBN 9788993463125
- Amazing Policies That Changed the World (Co-authored). Unistory. 11 May 2010. ISBN 9788996323112
- South Korea's Twentysomethings: Beyond the Triangle of Despair. Sidaeui-chang. 27 April 2009. ISBN 9788959401437

== Election history ==
Year	Election	Term	Office	Constituency	Party	Votes	Vote share	Rank	Result	Notes
2016	General election	20th	Member of the National Assembly	Proportional representation	Justice Party	1,719,891	7.23%	6th on proportional list	N/A	Left the party before succession
2022	Local elections	45th	District mayor	Mapo-gu, Seoul	Justice Party	7,760	4.48%	3rd	Lost	8th local election
2024	General election	22nd	Member of the National Assembly	Proportional representation	Reform Party	1,025,775	3.61%	10 on proportional list	Lost	
