= Recognition of same-sex unions in South Korea =

South Korea does not recognise same-sex marriage or civil unions. On 21 February 2023, an appellate court ruled that government health insurance should offer spousal coverage to same-sex couples, the "first legal recognition of social benefits for same-sex couples" in South Korea. This ruling was upheld by the Supreme Court of Korea on 19 July 2024.

Bills to establish civil unions recognising some of the rights and benefits of marriage were first introduced in 2014 by members of the Democratic Party of Korea. However, these bills have been unsuccessful in passing the National Assembly. A same-sex marriage bill was also introduced in May 2023 by MP Jang Hye-young. Additionally, lawsuits challenging the ban on same-sex marriage were filed in court in 2024 and 2026. Polling suggests that a minority of South Koreans support the legal recognition of same-sex marriage, with a 2025 Gallup Korea survey estimating that 34% of respondents backed legalization. However, surveys have shown that a majority of young South Koreans support the legalization of same-sex marriage.

== Limited legal rights ==
=== Diplomatic visas ===
In 2019, the Government of South Korea announced it would recognise the same-sex spouses of foreign diplomats who move to South Korea. The recognition does not extend to the same-sex spouses of South Korean diplomats living abroad or to South Korean same-sex couples. As of 2021, the only beneficiaries of this scheme have been New Zealand Ambassador Philip Turner and his husband Hiroshi Ikeda. Turner and Ikeda attended an official reception with President Moon Jae-in and his wife Kim Jung-sook at the Blue House in October 2019 as "legal spouses". Kyudok Hong, a professor at Sookmyung Women's University, said that "[this] symbolically shows that the recognition of same-sex marriage is a global trend and that Korea cannot ignore it."

=== Health insurance coverage ===
In February 2020, Kim Yong-min successfully registered his same-sex partner, So Seong-wook, as his spouse for the purpose of allowing So to access his employer's health insurance plan. When the story became public a few months later, the National Health Insurance Service (NHIS) reversed course and revoked the dependent status. In February 2021, So filed a lawsuit against the NHIS, claiming that it had unfairly discriminated against the couple as the agency provides spousal coverage to common-law partners, and only canceled his coverage under the insurance program of his partner's employer after learning of his same-sex marriage. In January 2022, an administrative court ruled against him citing the lack of legal recognition of same-sex unions in South Korea. So said he would appeal, "We will appeal, and the world will change. I believe a world in which people can live equally is coming soon." The Seoul High Court ruled in favor of the couple on 21 February 2023, holding that government health insurance should offer spousal coverage to same-sex couples, the "first legal recognition of social benefits for same-sex couples" in South Korea. The NHIS later announced it would appeal the ruling to the Supreme Court. On 16 May 2024, Human Rights Watch filed an amicus brief in support of the couple. On 18 July, the Supreme Court upheld the High Court ruling allowing same-sex partners equal NHIS spousal benefits. "I couldn't believe when I heard the ruling and I started crying," Kim told Reuters outside the court. "While this decision is a major milestone, the case itself is a sobering reminder of the lengthy judicial processes that same-sex couples must endure to secure basic rights that should be universally guaranteed," Amnesty International said in a statement.

Despite the court ruling, media outlets reported in September 2024 that the NHIS had rejected requests for spousal coverage from several same-sex couples. "We are currently reviewing the Supreme Court ruling related to recognizing the standard of life partner of the same sex, and will notify (the applicant) after we've set up the criteria", said the NHIS regarding an unidentified couple who had applied for spousal coverage. On 27 October 2024, an estimated 230,000 Christians demonstrated in Seoul against the ruling. A spokesperson for the organizers erroneously said the "verdict was unconstitutional because same-sex marriage has not been legalised".

== Civil partnerships ==
Laws regarding homosexuality in Asia Same-sex sexual activity legal Marriage performed Marriage recognized Other type of partnership Unregistered cohabitation No recognition of same-sex couples Restricted or ambiguous Restriction on freedom of expression, not enforced Severe restriction of association with arrests or detention Same-sex sexual activity illegal Prison, not enforced Prison Death penalty on books, not enforced Enforced death penalty

In October 2014, a bill to legalize life partnerships was proposed by some members of the Democratic Party of Korea. Life partnerships (Korean: 생활동반자관계, saenghwaldongbanjagwangye, pronounced [sʰeŋβwaɭdoŋbandʑaɡwanɡje]) would have been open to both opposite-sex and same-sex couples, and would have offered some of the rights and benefits of marriage, such as tax benefits and protection from domestic violence, among others. However, the bill was not brought to a vote in the National Assembly. In February 2021, the government announced plans to recognise domestic partnerships for opposite-sex couples in light of the country's falling birth rate, mostly attributed to the cost of raising children and education. The reform would not have applied to same-sex couples; "There hasn't been any discussion nor even a consideration about same-sex couples", a government spokesperson said. Human Rights Watch urged the government to recognise same-sex domestic partnerships.

On 26 April 2023, a group of lawmakers introduced a life partnership bill, which would have applied to a wider range of groups living together as a family, such as the elderly, friends, and unmarried couples, and provided them with rights in the areas of inheritance, adoption and housing matters, as well as other legal protections. Representative Ryu Ho-jeong, a sponsor of the legislation, said she hoped the bill would address South Korea's declining birth rate, citing the increase in the birth rate in France following the introduction of the civil solidarity pact in 1999. Another bill was proposed in 2025 by Representative Yong Hye-in. Former Constitutional Court Justice Moon Hyung-bae expressed his support, stating that "[r]ecognizing partnerships beyond marriage is essential in addressing Korea's loneliness crisis, social caregiving gap and declining birthrate".

== Same-sex marriage ==
=== Summary ===
Same-sex marriage (동성결혼, dongseong gyeolhon, pronounced [toŋsʰʌŋ kjʌɾβon]) (Note: Jeju: 동성절혼, dongseong jeorhon) is not recognized in South Korea. However, debate on the issue has emerged in recent years, and polling suggests rising support for same-sex marriage among the South Korean public, notably among women and the younger generation. Lawsuits challenging the ban on same-sex marriage were filed in 2024 and 2026.

=== Court cases ===
In July 2004, the Incheon District Court dismissed an alimony claim filed by a same-sex couple who had lived together for 20 years before separating. The court ruled that their union could not be recognized as a common-law marriage under Korean law. That same year, a same-sex couple, Lee Sang-cheol (45) and Park Jong-geun (41), attempted to register their marriage at a local office in Eunpyeong District but were rejected. In May 2014, Kim-Jho Gwangsoo and his partner, Kim Seung-hwan, filed a lawsuit seeking legal recognition of their relationship. The couple had held a public wedding ceremony in Seoul in September 2013, but their marriage registration was subsequently rejected by local authorities. Oral arguments were heard in July 2015, and on 25 May 2016 the Seoul Western District Court ruled against the couple, stating that, in the absence of clear legislation, a same-sex union could not be recognized as a marriage. The couple appealed the ruling. Their lawyer, Ryu Min-hee, announced that two additional same-sex couples had filed separate lawsuits seeking the right to marry. On 5 December 2016, an appellate court upheld the district court's decision. In February 2019, the National Human Rights Commission of Korea rejected a petition filed by a British-South Korean same-sex couple seeking recognition of their marriage performed in the United Kingdom. The commission stated that, without legislative action or a judicial ruling, foreign same-sex marriages could not be legally recognized.

In October 2024, eleven same-sex couples announced their intention to file a lawsuit challenging the refusal of Seoul district offices to issue them marriage licenses. The plaintiff couples argued that: "Marriage equality is not only a fundamental issue of dignity but also an urgent matter of livelihood to secure equal protection, respect and recognition that their fellow citizens earn from marriage". In April 2026, three additional same-sex couples simultaneously filed lawsuits in Daegu, Busan and Ulsan against local governments' refusals to process their marriage registrations.

=== Legislative activity ===
In May 2023, MP Jang Hye-young introduced a same-sex marriage bill co-sponsored by 12 lawmakers to the National Assembly. The bill would modify the definition of marriage in the Civil Code to include same-sex marriages.

=== Political viewpoints ===
The Democratic Labor Party, established in January 2000, had a political panel known as the Sexual Minorities Committee (Korean: 민주노동당 성소수자위원회, Minjunodongdang Seongsosujawiwonhoe) which advocated for the recognition and political representation of LGBT people. Their stated agenda included a campaign against homophobia and discrimination based on sexual orientation, equal rights for sexual minorities, and "complete freedom, equality, and right of pursuit of happiness for homosexuals", as well as the legalization of same-sex marriage. In its campaign for the 2004 parliamentary elections, the Democratic Labor Party promised the abolition of all inequalities against LGBT people, and won 10 seats in the National Assembly. The party later merged with the Unified Progressive Party in 2011, which was banned in 2014 on charges of plotting a pro-North Korea rebellion. The Justice Party and the Green Party have also expressed support for LGBT rights and the legal recognition of same-sex unions, as well as some members of the Democratic Party of Korea. In an interview held in September 2014 and later published in October, the Mayor of Seoul, Park Won-soon, announced his support for same-sex marriage, saying he hoped South Korea would become the first country in Asia to legalize same-sex marriage. A few days later, the Seoul Metropolitan Government stated that his words had been "misinterpreted" and that he meant to say that "maybe South Korea would become the first country in Asia to legalize same-sex marriage". This followed severe backlash from conservative Christian groups. During the 2017 presidential election, only one of the 14 presidential candidates, the Justice Party's Sim Sang-jung, voiced clear support for LGBT rights.

The People Power Party is opposed to LGBT rights and same-sex marriage. On December 19, 2007, Lee Myung-bak of the conservative Grand National Party won the presidential election. In a 2007 newspaper interview, Lee stated that homosexuality was "abnormal", and that he opposed the legal recognition of same-sex marriages. President Moon Jae-in, in office between 2017 and 2022, was also opposed to same-sex marriage.

== Public opinion ==
Support for same-sex marriage among 18–21-year-olds according to a 2016 survey from the Varkey Foundation

An April 2013 Gallup poll revealed that 25% of South Koreans supported same-sex marriage, while 67% opposed and 8% did not know or had refused to answer. A May 2013 Ipsos poll found that 26% of respondents were in favour of same-sex marriage and another 31% supported other forms of recognition for same-sex couples. According to a survey conducted by the matchmaking website Duo between 25 July and 1 August 2015, nearly 70% of female respondents viewed same-sex marriage as "acceptable", while 50% of men were against legalizing same-sex marriage. The majority of respondents who supported same-sex marriage said they did so because marriage was a personal choice (68%), because sexual orientation was determined by nature (14%), or because it would help end discrimination (12%).

According to the Asan Institute for Policy Studies, 31% and 21% of South Koreans in their 20s and 30s, respectively, supported the legalization of same-sex marriages in 2010. In 2014, these numbers had almost doubled to 60% and 40%, respectively. Support among people over 60, however, had remained unchanged (14% to 15%). A September–October 2016 survey by the Varkey Foundation found that 47% of 18–21-year-olds supported same-sex marriage in South Korea. A 2017 Gallup Korea poll found that 58% of South Koreans opposed legalising same-sex marriage, while 34% supported and 8% were undecided. Another survey in December 2017 conducted by Gallup for MBC and the Speaker of the National Assembly reported that 41% of South Koreans thought same-sex marriage should be allowed, while 53% were against.

A 2022 Hankook Research poll showed that 34% of South Koreans supported same-sex marriage, while 52% were opposed and 14% were undecided. Support was highest among 18–29-year-olds and people who personally knew a gay person. A Pew Research Center poll conducted between June and September 2023 showed that 41% of South Koreans supported same-sex marriage, 56% were opposed and 3% did not know or had refused to answer. When divided by age, support was highest among 18–34-year-olds at 61% and lowest among those aged 35 and above at 34%. Women (48%) were also more likely to support same-sex marriage than men (33%). Support was highest among the religiously unaffiliated at 50%, and lowest among Buddhists at 38% and Christians at 27%. Two 2025 opinion surveys indicated that public support for the legalization of same-sex marriage had declined. A Hankook Research poll showed support dropping from 36% in 2021 to 31% in 2025. A separate Gallup Korea survey reported 34% backing legalization compared to 58% opposition.

== See also ==
- LGBT rights in South Korea
- Recognition of same-sex unions in Asia
- Same-sex union court cases
