= Her Eun-a =

South Korean politician (born 1972)

- 허은아
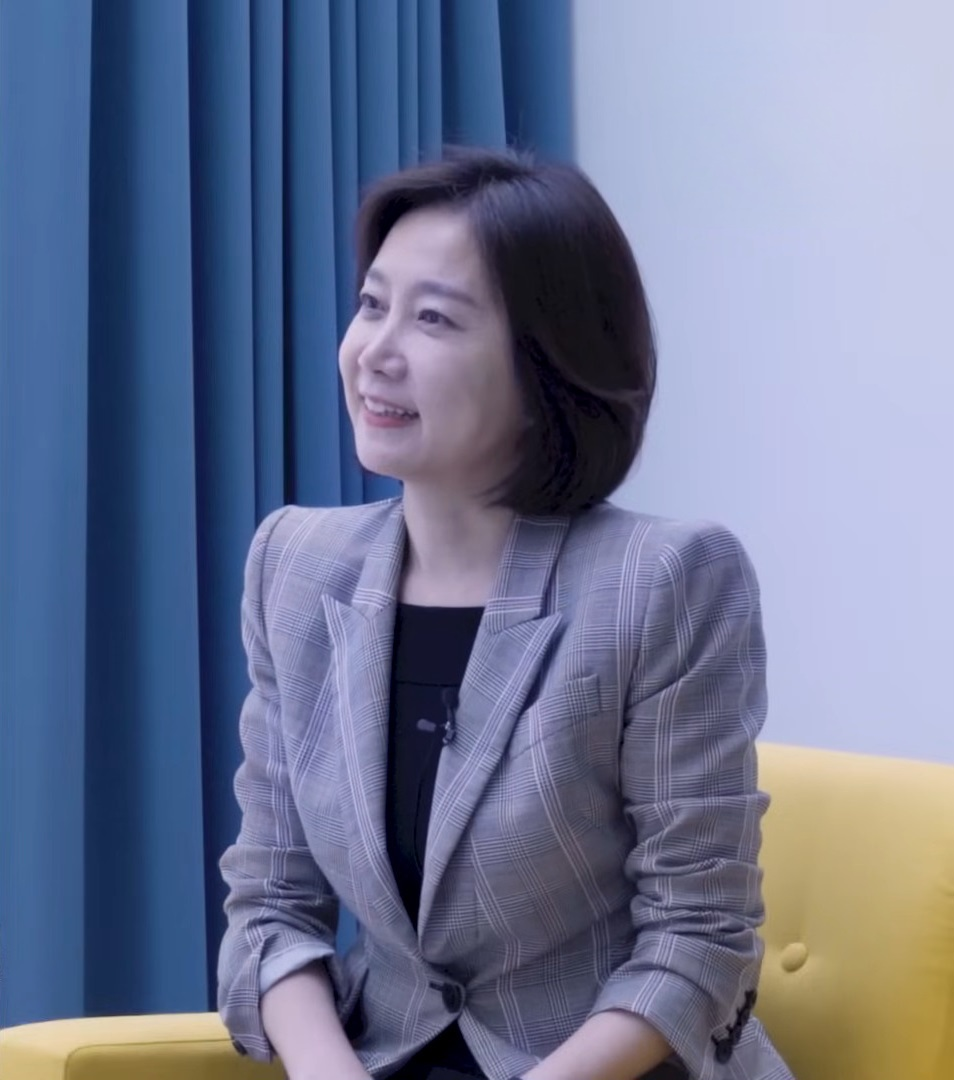
- Heo Eun-ah in 2024

National Integration Secretary
- Incumbent
- Assumed office 28 October 2025
- Preceded by: Kang Jun-wook

Leader of the New Reform Party
- In office 20 May 2024 – 26 January 2025
- Preceded by: Lee Jun-seok
- Succeeded by: Chun Ha-ram (acting)

Member of the National Assembly
- In office 30 May 2020 – 1 May 2024
- Constituency: Proportional representation

Personal details
- Born: 26 May 1972 (age 54) Seongbuk District, Seoul, South Korea
- Citizenship: South Korean
- Party: Independent (2020, 2024, 2025-present)
- Other political affiliations: Liberty Korea (2020); Future Korea (2020); People Power (2020-2024); New Reform (2024-2025); Democratic (2025)
- Education: Sungkyunkwan University (PhD)

- Her Eun-a
- Hangul: 허은아
- Hanja: 許垠娥
- RR: Heo Euna
- MR: Hŏ Ŭna

Her Eun-a (Korean: 허은아; born 26 May 1972) is a South Korean politician and former entrepreneur.

She was born on 26 May 1972 at Seongbuk District, Seoul. She was a former flight attendant at Korean Air. She founded the image consulting company Yerago (예라고) in 1999. In January 2020, she joined the Liberty Korea Party as an external talent in an image consulting role. She was elected for the first time in the 2020 election via proportional representation in 19th position on her party's list. She has announced her defection to join New Reform Party set to be launched by former People Power Party leader Lee Jun-seok. She served as the leader of the New Reform Party from 20 May 2024 until her removal on 26 January 2025. Following her removal she defected to the Democratic Party. On October 28, 2025, she was appointed as the National Integration Secretary. She left the Democratic Party due to inauguration to public office.

== Election results ==
Year	Elections	Constituency	Political party	Votes (%)	Results
2020	21st National Assembly General Election	Proportional representation (19th)	FKP	9,441,520 (33.84%)	Elected
2024	22nd National Assembly General Election	Yeongdeungpo A (Seoul)	NFP	5,084 (3.78%)	Defeated (3rd)

== See also ==
- List of members of the National Assembly (South Korea), 2020–2024
