= LGBTQ rights in South Korea =

- South Korea
- Legal status: Legal
- Gender identity: Transgender people allowed to change legal sex
- Military: Same-sex intercourse is illegal in the military, punishable by up to two years imprisonment.
- Discrimination protections: 15 local governments have enacted anti-discrimination policies and provisions that include sexual orientation, though not nationally

Family rights
- Recognition of relationships: No recognition of same-sex relationships
- Adoption: No

Lesbian, gay, bisexual, transgender, and queer (LGBTQ+) people in South Korea face prejudice, discrimination, and other barriers to social inclusion not experienced by non-LGBTQ residents. Same-sex intercourse is legal for civilians in South Korea, but in the military, same-sex intercourse among soldiers is a crime, and all able-bodied men must complete about one and a half years of military service under the conscript system. South Korean national law does not recognize same-sex marriage or civil unions, nor does it protect against discrimination based on sexual orientation or gender identity. Same-sex couples cannot jointly adopt, and a 2021 Human Rights Watch investigation found that LGBTQ students face "bullying and harassment, a lack of confidential mental health support, exclusion from school curricula, and gender identity discrimination" in South Korean schools.

On the 2019 Franklin & Marshall Global Barometer of Gay Rights, South Korea was one of only three OECD countries to earn an F, whereas the OECD average is B. Countries graded an F are characterized by the report as "persecuting" their LGBTQ communities. According to a 2025 data from the Pew Research Center, 56% of South Koreans view homosexuality as "morally unacceptable." This figure is significantly higher than in many other developed countries, such as Japan (21%) or Spain (7%).

Homosexuality remains taboo in South Korean society. Homosexuality is not specifically mentioned in either the South Korean Constitution or in the Civil Penal Code, although article 2 of the National Human Rights Commission Of Korea Act includes sexual orientation as one of the protected classes. Transgender or non-binary people are excluded from military service.

Transgender people are allowed to undergo gender affirming care in South Korea at the age of 19, and can change their gender identity on official documents. Harisu is South Korea's first transgender entertainer, and in 2002 became the second person in South Korea to legally change sex.

Gay and lesbian Koreans still face difficulties at home and work, and many prefer not to reveal their sexual orientation to family, friends or co-workers out of fear of discrimination and being ostracized.

A 2023 survey by the Pew Research Center found that a majority of South Koreans (56%) opposed the legalization of same-sex marriage. This opposition stood in contrast to regional countries, such as Japan and Vietnam, where support for same-sex marriage was significantly higher at 74% and 65%, respectively. Furthermore, a 2024 survey by Statista found that South Korea reported the lowest share of people identifying as LGBTQ among 43 countries surveyed, at only 3%. This figure was significantly lower than that of some Asian countries, including the Philippines (11%) and Thailand (10%).

== Etymology ==
The Korean word for "homosexual" is dongseongaeja (Korean: 동성애자; Hanja: 同性愛者, "same-sex lover"), which is of Sino-Korean origin. A less considerate, but quite common, term is dongseongyeonaeja (동성연애자; 同性戀愛者). South Korean homosexuals, however, make frequent use of the term ibanin (이반인; 異般人, 二般人) which can be translated as "different type person", and is usually shortened to iban (이반; 異般).

The word is a direct play on the word ilban-in (일반인; 一般人) meaning "normal person" or "ordinary person". In addition, English loanwords are used in South Korea to describe LGBTQ people. These words are simple transliterations of English words into hangul: lesbian (initially, a loanword from Greek to English) is lejeubieon or yeoseongae (레즈비언 or 여성애; 女性愛), gay is gei or namseongae (게이 or 남성애; 男性愛), queer is kwieo (퀴어), transgender is teuraenseujendeo (트랜스젠더), and bisexual is yangseongaeja (양성애자; 兩性愛者).

== History ==
There is very little mention of homosexuality in Korean literature or traditional historical accounts. While some accounts of homosexuality exist, their accuracy has been disputed.

Several members of the nobility and Buddhist monks have been known to either profess their attraction to members of the same sex or else be actively involved with them.

During the Silla Dynasty, several noblemen and noblewomen are recorded to have engaged in homosexual activity and expressed their love for a person of the same sex. Among these is King Hyegong. In addition, the hwarang (Hangul: 화랑; Hanja: 花郞), also known as the "Flowering Knights" or the "Flowering Boys", were an elite group of male Silla warriors, famous for their homoeroticism and femininity. The Samguk yusa, a collection of Korean legends, folktales and historical accounts, contains verses that reveal the homosexual nature of the hwarang.

During the Goryeo Dynasty, King Mokjong (980–1009) and King Gongmin (1325–1374) are both on record as having kept several wonchung ("male lovers") in their courts as "little-brother attendants" (chajewhi) who served as sexual partners. After the death of his wife, King Gongmin even went so far as to create a ministry whose sole purpose was to seek out and recruit young men from all over the country to serve in his court. Others, including King Chungseon, had long-term relationships with men. Those who were in same-sex relationships were referred to as yongyang jichong, whose translation has been subject to argument, but is generally viewed as meaning the "dragon and the sun".

In the Joseon Era, several noblemen and noblewomen are known to have had same-sex sexual relations, including Royal Noble Consort Sun-bin Bong who was the second consort of Munjong of Joseon and King Sejong's daughter-in-law who was banished after it was discovered that she was sleeping with one of her maids. During this period, there were travelling theater groups known as namsadang, which included underaged males called midong ("beautiful boys"). The troupes provided "various types of entertainment, including band music, song, masked dance, circus, and puppet plays," sometimes with graphic representations of same-sex intercourse. The namsandang were further separated in two groups; the "butch" members (숫동모, sutdongmo) and the "queens" (여동모, yeodongmo or 암동모, amdongmo).

The spread of Neo-Confucianism in South Korea shaped the moral system, the way of life, and social relations of Korean society. Neo-Confucianism emphasizes strict obedience to the social order and the family unit, which refers to a husband and wife. Homosexuality and same-sex relationships were viewed as disturbing this system and thus were perceived as "deviant" or "immoral". Since the 1910s, Neo-Confucianism has lost a lot of influence, though still today Confucian ideas and practices significantly define South Korean culture and society.

Homosexuality was officially declassified as "harmful and obscene" in 2003. In August 2017, the Supreme Court of Korea ordered the government to allow "Beyond the Rainbow" (비온뒤무지개재단), an LGBTQ rights foundation, to register as a charity with the Ministry of Justice. Without official registration, the foundation was unable to receive tax-deductible donations and operate in full compliance with the law. In 2014, the South Korean government voted in favor of a symbolic United Nations resolution aimed at combating discrimination against LGBTQ people.

=== COVID-19 related discrimination ===
In May 2020, the government of Seoul relaxed COVID-19 lockdown restrictions and allowed bars and nightclubs to operate. In the days that followed, a cluster of new cases of COVID-19 were reported in the inner-city area of Itaewon, where an estimated 5700 people may have been exposed. These cases were eventually linked to bars and clubs that catered to gay men, fueling a backlash against the LGBTQ community that involved a marked increase in online harassment against members of the gay community as being immoral, and calls for LGBTQ events to close.

The situation also led to discussion about homophobia in South Korea, and the coronavirus contact surveillance program exposed personal details of LGBTQ people, accidentally outing them. Foreigners and expats also reported increased harassment following the outbreak.

The period saw a rise in doxing and harassment amongst users of gay dating apps, whose personal information was shared "for spreading coronavirus".

The Itaewon crowd crush had a negative effect on the numerous LGBTQ establishments catering for foreigners in the area, and prevented the revival of the district following the COVID lockdown.

== Recognition of same-sex relationships ==
Same-sex marriages and civil unions are not legally recognized in South Korea. In October 2019, the Government of South Korea announced it would recognize the same-sex spouses of foreign diplomats, but it would not recognize the same-sex spouses of South Korean diplomats who serve overseas.

In October 2014, some members of the Democratic Party introduced a bill to recognize same-sex partnerships to the National Assembly. However, the bill was never brought to a vote.

In July 2015, actor Kim Jho Gwangsoo and his partner Kim Seung-Hwan filed a lawsuit seeking legal status for their marriage. The lawsuit was rejected by the Seoul Western District Court in May 2016 and by an appeals court in December 2016. The couple subsequently announced that they would bring their case to the Supreme Court.

In May 2019, Kim Gyu-Jin and her wife legally married and registered their marriage with the New York City Marriage Bureau. They later held a separate "factory wedding" ceremony in Seoul that November. A year later, in May 2020, to celebrate their first anniversary, Kim Gyu-Jin and her spouse attempted to register their marriage with the Jongno-gu Office in Seoul but were issued a "notice of non-repair" (refusal). Kim Gyu-Jin's experiences were featured on prime time by KBS, a Korean national broadcaster, and on the main news page of KakaoTalk, South Korea's leading messaging app. The public reaction was overwhelmingly negative. The KakaoTalk article reportedly received around 10,000 comments, with more than 80% being negative. The comments ranged from telling the couple to "Get out of Korea" to expressing fears that society and families would "fall apart" due to lesbian weddings. Due to the intensely malicious and threatening nature of many replies, Kim Gyu-Jin consulted a lawyer, pushed police to intervene with the portal sites, and ultimately sued the 100 most malicious commentators.

In January 2021, Seoul's Ministry of Gender Equality and Family announced plans to propose changes to civil and welfare regulations that would allow single parents and unmarried, cohabitating partners to be recognized as legal families. However, the ministry confirmed that these reforms would apply only to heterosexual couples. An official, speaking anonymously due to lack of media authorization, noted in an email that there had been "no discussion nor even a consideration about same-sex couples".

=== Supreme Court health insurance ruling ===
In February 2020, a man in a same-sex relationship, Kim Yong-min, successfully registered his partner, So Seong-wook, as his spouse, allowing So to access his employer's health insurance plan. When the story became public a few months later, the National Health Insurance Service (NHIS) reversed course and revoked the dependent status. In February 2021, So filed a lawsuit against the NHIS. He claimed that the NHIS had unfairly discriminated against the couple as the agency provides spousal coverage to common-law partners, and only canceled his coverage under the insurance program of his partner's employer after learning of his same-sex marriage. In January 2022, an administrative court ruled against him, citing the lack of legal recognition of same-sex unions in South Korea. So said he would appeal, "We will appeal, and the world will change. I believe a world in which people can live equally is coming soon." The Seoul High Court ruled in favor of the couple on 21 February 2023, holding that government health insurance should offer spousal coverage to same-sex couples, the "first legal recognition of social benefits for same-sex couples" in South Korea. The National Health Insurance Service later announced it would appeal the ruling to the Supreme Court. On 16 May 2024, Human Rights Watch filed an amicus brief in support of the couple. On 18 July, the Supreme Court upheld the High Court ruling allowing same-sex partners equal NHIS spousal benefits. "I couldn't believe when I heard the ruling and I started crying," Kim told Reuters outside the court. "While this decision is a major milestone, the case itself is a sobering reminder of the lengthy judicial processes that same-sex couples must endure to secure basic rights that should be universally guaranteed," Amnesty International said in a statement. In the last week of September 2023, multiple media outlets reported that the National Health Insurance Service (NHIS) rejected requests from same-sex couples to receive spousal coverage. The NHIS said that, unlike cases related to heterosexual couples, there are no regulations stating which legal documents are required for same-sex couples. Although the Constitutional Court and the Supreme Court are treated as coequal the two courts have persistently come into conflict with each other over which of them is the final arbiter of the meaning of the Constitution. In October 2023, the relationship between the two high courts came to a head when the Constitutional Court overturned a Supreme Court decision and upheld a military anti-LGBTQ law. The Constitutional Court of Korea has yet to deliver a final verdict on the case.

== Discrimination protections ==
The National Human Rights Commission Act (Korean: 국가인권위원회법), enacted in 2001, established the National Human Rights Commission of Korea (NHRCK). Under South Korean law, the NHRCK is an independent commission for protecting, advocating, and promoting human rights. The National Human Rights Commission Act explicitly includes sexual orientation as an anti-discrimination ground. When discriminatory acts are found to have occurred, the National Human Rights Commission of Korea may conduct investigations on such acts and recommend non-binding relief measures, disciplinary actions or report them to the authorities. Even so, the body does not have coercive powers.

South Korean national law does not prohibit discrimination based on sexual orientation or gender identity. Over the years, a repeated cycle of anti-discrimination legislation has been proposed and abandoned. An anti-discrimination bill was submitted in 2007 by the Ministry of Justice, but a movement of opposition arose and led to the bill being abandoned. In 2013, a bill to include sexual orientation, religion and political ideology to the country's anti-discrimination law was introduced. It received fierce opposition from conservative groups.

During the 17th National Assembly, an anti-discrimination bill was sponsored by the late Roh Hoe-chan. Another bill was sponsored by former lawmaker Kwon Young-gil during the 18th National Assembly. Both bills were dropped before any debate had taken place. During the 19th National Assembly, former lawmakers Kim Han-gil and Choi Won-sik sponsored bills only to withdraw them after encountering objections. In 2019, the National Assembly failed to hold a debate on comprehensive anti-discrimination legislation. Objections to the anti-discrimination bills come chiefly from conservative Protestants.

During the 20th National Assembly, lawmaker Kim Tae-heum (Liberty Korea Party) presented a bill that would have removed the category of sexual orientation from the National Human Rights Commission Act. In 2019, politician Ahn Sang-soo introduced another bill to repeal the protection for sexual orientation in the National Human Rights Commission Act and to restrict legal recognition of gender to a biological basis. The bill was supported by 40 of the Assembly's 300 MPs, drawing criticism and protests from LGBTQ advocates and Amnesty International.

As of 2019, the Justice Party planned to prepare a comprehensive anti-discrimination bill. A 2014 poll found that 85% of South Koreans believed gay people should be protected from discrimination. According to a more recent poll, conducted in 2017 by Gallup Korea, 90% of South Koreans said they supported equal employment opportunities for LGBTQ people.

On 23 December, in a special report issued by the National Human Rights Commission, President Moon Jae-in stressed the need for equality legislation. While acknowledging there is some opposition to the enactment of an anti-discrimination law, Moon said he expects the National Assembly to actively discuss such legislation in the near future. The U.N. Committee on the Elimination of Discrimination against Women, the Committee on Economic, Social and Cultural Rights, the Committee on the Rights of the Child, the Committee on the Elimination of Racial Discrimination, and the Human Rights Committee have recommended the enactment of anti-discrimination legislation. As a presidential candidate in 2012, Moon cited a comprehensive anti-discrimination act as one of the top 10 priorities of his human rights policy. Since taking office in 2017, Moon has been reluctant to enact such legislation amid opposition from within his governing Democratic Party of Korea.

In 2022, NBC News spoke with progressive South Korean lawmakers and dozens of LGBTQ+ South Koreans across the country; most said a comprehensive nondiscrimination bill that would outlaw discrimination against all minority groups, including the LGBTQ+ community, is key first step toward legal equality. In the view of activists, the codification of a nondiscrimination law could catalyze additional legal protections, like same-sex marriage, domestic partnerships, and joint adoption for same-sex couples. Some LGBTQ+ activists said the bill alone could still ease their everyday sense of danger. June Green, a trans-male bartender from Seoul, told NBC News reporter Michael Mitsanas that "because we still don't have a nondiscrimination bill, I often feel threatened to just walk on the street."

On LGBTQ+ rights, South Korea is an outlier among OECD nations, according to an NBC News analysis. On the 2019 Franklin & Marshall Global Barometer of Gay Rights, OECD nations averaged a grade of B. South Korea, however, was one of three OECD countries to earn an "F." Countries that receive an F are "persecuting" their LGBTQ+ communities.

=== Province-level protections ===
Map of provinces, cities, districts and counties in South Korea that have LGBTQ discrimination protections Bans discrimination on the basis of sexual orientation

Currently, 15 local governments in South Korea have enacted anti-discrimination policies and provisions (not laws) that include sexual orientation. This includes five first-level subdivisions: South Gyeongsang Province, Seoul, Jeju Province, North Chungcheong Province and South Chungcheong Province.

South Gyeongsang Province enacted anti-discrimination policies in March 2010. The policy states that "citizens shall not be discriminated, without reasonable grounds, on the grounds of sex, religion, disability, age, social status, region of origin, state of origin, ethnic origin, physical condition such as appearance, medical history, marital status, political opinion, and sexual orientation".

Seoul passed regional policies aimed at combatting discrimination on the grounds mentioned in the National Human Rights Commission Act in September 2012. The passage of this policy received fierce and violent opposition from conservative groups.

Similarly, both Jeju Province and North Chungcheong Province passed similar policies in October 2015 banning discrimination on the grounds mentioned in the National Human Rights Commission Act. South Chungcheong Province followed suit in October 2018.

Several second-level jurisdictions have also enacted anti-discrimination provisions that cover sexual orientation. These are:

- Yeonje District, Busan (November 2010)
- Suyeong District, Busan (December 2010)
- Buk District, Ulsan (January 2011)
- Nam District, Busan (May 2011)
- Buk District, Busan (March 2012)
- Jung District, Ulsan (April 2013)
- Dong District, Daejeon (April 2015)
- Haeundae District, Busan (July 2015)
- Eunpyeong District, Seoul (October 2015)
- Hwasun County, South Jeolla (December 2017)

=== Anti-bullying and student ordinances ===
Gyeonggi Province banned bullying against students on the basis of their sexual orientation in October 2010. Gwangju followed suit in October 2011, and Seoul in January 2012. Seoul's ordinance on the protection of children and youth also includes gender identity, thereby protecting transgender students from discrimination. North Jeolla Province enacted an ordinance banning bullying against "sexual minorities" in January 2013.

There is growing debate and discussing in South Gyeongsang Province, Incheon, and Busan for the passage of a similar law.

=== Other anti-discrimination provisions ===
In addition, other symbolic protections for "sexual minorities" exist. Police officers and Coast Guard personnel are forbidden from outing an LGBTQ person against their own will.

In November 2017, the city of Geoje passed a policy that prohibits broadcasting agencies from spreading information encouraging discrimination against "sexual minorities". Hongcheon County and Gangneung followed suit in November and December 2018, respectively.

Furthermore, several activist groups and coalitions have been created within the South Korean LGBTQ community to advocate for human rights for LGBTQ people. For example, the "Rainbow Action against Sexual Minority Discrimination," otherwise known as "Rainbow Action," is a coalition of several non-governmental organizations that work to promote and expand LGBTQ rights in Korea. Rainbow Action works to address several issues within the Korean community including perspectives on conversion therapy, HIV-related stigma, hate crimes, intersex persons, and more.

=== Constitutional rights ===
The Constitution of South Korea prohibits discrimination on the basis of sex, religion, and social status. According to the Ministry of Justice, the term "social status" includes LGBTQ people. However, there are no remedies for LGBTQ victims of discrimination nor are these "protections" enforced.

=== Health care insurance benefits ===
On 7 January 2022, a South Korean same-sex couple was refused health care insurance benefits by a lower court. In its ruling, the Seoul Administrative Court said matrimony in South Korea is still considered a union between a man and a woman. This ruling was overturned the following year, on 21 February 2023, when the Seoul High Court decided that the state's health insurer – the National Health Insurance Service – should provide spousal coverage to a same-sex couple. This marked the first time any court recognized the rights of a same-sex couple in South Korea. Then in 2024, the Supreme Court of South Korea ruled that same-sex couples are eligible to receive the same health insurance benefits as heterosexual couples.

== Military service ==
Consensual same-sex intercourse is a crime in the South Korean military. Article 92-6 of the 1962 Military Criminal Act criminalizes “anal intercourse” or “any other indecent acts” between military personnel, and carries a punishment of up to two years in prison. In April 2022, the Supreme Court found that the law cannot be applied to consensual acts that occur off-base during off-duty hours. Activists have called for the Constitutional Court to rule the law unconstitutional.

Military service is mandatory for all male citizens in South Korea. Enlistees are drafted through the Military Manpower Administration (MMA; Korean: 병무청) which administers a "psychology test" at the time of enlistment that includes several questions regarding the enlistee's sexual preferences. Homosexual military members in active duty are categorized as having a "personality disorder" or "behavioral disability" and can either be institutionalized or dishonorably discharged.

In 2017, Amnesty International accused the military of engaging in a "gay witch hunt" to expose and punish gay personnel, by criminally charging 32 military personnel for "sodomy or other disgraceful conduct", including sentencing a gay soldier to six months imprisonment for having consensual sex with another gay soldier in a private place.

In January 2020, staff sergeant Byun Hui-su, a transgender conscript, was dismissed from military after undergoing gender affirming care, and later committed suicide. In 2021, a South Korean district court posthumously reinstated her.

In April 2022, the Supreme Court ruled that this law cannot be applied to consensual acts that occur outside of military facilities during off-duty hours. However, apart from the Supreme Court of Korea's ruling, the Constitutional Court of Korea still upheld the constitutionality of the law on 26 October 2023, following petitions asking to declare it unconstitutional .

== Transgender rights ==
In South Korea, gender-affirming care is not currently covered by state health insurance. In a 2019 survey of 500 Korean people between the ages of 16 and 64, Korean respondents are likely to have a positive or neutral view of transgender people. 12% of Koreans said that they knew a friend or family member who was transgender. Roughly 60% of the Korean respondents also said that transgender individuals should be protected from discrimination, and that they should be allowed gender-affirming healthcare. 45% said they should not be allowed in the military. A slight majority of Korean respondents agreed that South Korea is becoming more accepting of transgender people, and a significant majority agreed that transgender people are not violating traditional Korean cultural values. However, this survey didn't actually use the word "transgender" and instead asked questions about people who dress and act as if they aren't the sex assigned at birth.

Transgender and gender diverse South Koreans face discriminatory challenges unique to their communities. It said that employment is difficult to for transgender people because certain jobs are often gendered. Koreans are less likely to support marriage equality for transgender people.

In March 2026, nearly two years after the Byun Huisu Foundation applied for recognition as a nonprofit, it was approved. A conservative member of the NHRCK had obstructed the approval process, in response to which the foundation's creators sued the NHRCK; the Seoul Administrative Court ruled that the delay was illegal, after which the NHRCK approved the nonprofit. The Byun Huisu Foundation will support transgender rights.

=== Legal documents ===
The seventh digit of the country's national identification number, known as the National Pension Number, corresponds to one's sex assigned at birth, amounting to what some LGBTQ activists call "forced outing" in job interviews. In June 2006, however, the Supreme Court ruled that transgender individuals who had undergone successful sex reassignment surgery have the right to declare their new sex in all legal documents. This includes the right to request a correction of their gender-on-file in all public and government records such as the census registry.

In March 2013, the Seoul Western District Court ruled that five trans men can be registered as male without undergoing sex reassignment surgery. In February 2017, the Cheongju District Court ruled that a trans woman could be registered as a female without undergoing surgery.

=== Military service ===
In March 2021, Byun Hui-su - South Korea's first transgender soldier, who was forcibly discharged after undergoing gender affirming care - died by suicide. The Defense Ministry classified her loss of male genitals as a mental or physical handicap, and a military panel ruled in early 2020 that she would be compulsorily discharged. However, on October 7, 2021, the Daejeon District Court determined that the presence or absence of certain male physical traits could not be used as grounds for a mental or physical disability, and thus deemed the discharge decision unjust. On March 29, 2024, the Ministry of National Defense recognized Staff Sergeant Byun Hui-su's death as being in the line of duty.

=== Access to healthcare ===
In 2011, the Supreme Court of Korea ruled that in order for a person to be eligible for gender affirming care they must be over 20 years of age, single, and without children. In the case of male-to-female gender reassignment operations, the person must prove issues related to draft resolved by either serving or being exempted. On November 24, 2022, the Supreme Court's en banc panel ruled that transgender individuals with minor children can have their gender legally recognized, provided they are not in a marital relationship. This decision overturned a precedent set 11 years earlier, which uniformly denied gender recognition for transgender individuals with minor children.

Surveys indicate that healthcare professionals in South Korea tend to hold strongly negative opinions of transgender individuals. It has also been found that healthcare providers with higher knowledge of trans people and trans issues had more positive dispositions towards trans people, but that healthcare providers with negative views tended to involve themselves much more heavily with the collection of data regarding trans people.

== Intersex people ==
In Korea, intersex people are largely ignored or marginalized because of the lack of familiarity with the term "intersex" itself and because of the general stigma that surrounds intersex people. As a result, intersex people are faced with a lack of access to medical services and some are even pushed to getting "genital normalizing surgery" without informed consent. This concept of medicalizing intersex people is still very prevalent in Korea and perpetuates the social diagnosis of intersex people as "diseased" or having to receive surgical "normalization." To mitigate these problems, in October 2015, South Korea joined the International Lesbian, Gay, Bisexual, Trans, and Intersex Association (ILGA) and have started increasing the number of articles and information on intersex people that are published nationwide to increase general knowledge about intersex people.

== Conversion therapy ==
In a 2016 survey, 16.1% of LGBTQ people who had come out were recommended to undergo conversion therapy. Of these, 65.4% said it had a harmful impact on their lives, with 94% experiencing psychological trauma. A 2017 survey reported that 58% of LGBTQ individuals who experienced conversion therapy in the past are still negatively affected by it in the present. Studies have shown that 40% of LGBTQ respondents have claimed to have experienced homophobic statements or discriminatory treatment by counselors for conversion therapy.

== Blood donation ==
South Korea forbids people who have had sex "with certain high-risk individuals" within the past one year to donate blood. These rules apply equally to all people, regardless of their sexual orientation or gender identity. The official guidelines urge people to not donate for the purposes of finding out if they have AIDS.

== Living conditions ==
Homosexuality remains quite taboo in South Korean society. The World Values Survey of 2005 to 2009 had shown that Korea was the second most-hostile country towards homosexuals among 17 countries surveyed.

In 2022, NBC News producer Michael Mitsanas spent "months" documenting the LGBTQ+ experience in South Korea, according to Hallie Jackson. LGBTQ+ South Koreans who spoke to NBC News described a culture of "round-the-clock" discrimination and abuse. Rep. Jang Hye-yeong told NBC News that "just telling somebody that you are LGBTQ will certainly subject you to discrimination." Jeon-il, a gay bartender in Itaewon, told Mitsanas that holding hands with a partner in public is "basically impossible." Yoo - who asked that NBC News withhold his full name, citing a fear of retribution - said he must "erase the queer to act masculine" while working his corporate job in Seoul, adding that he's "afraid" of what his coworkers would do "if they find out I'm gay." June Green, a trans-male bartender in Seoul, said he must make "a deeper voice whenever I leave my house, and even then, people still approach me to ask if I'm a guy or girl."

=== Bullying and discrimination ===
Young LGBTQ people in South Korea often face bullying and discrimination. A 2014 survey conducted by the GongGam Human Rights Law Foundation revealed that 54% of LGBTQ Korean youths reported being harassed previously by their classmates and fellow students. Students interviewed by Human Rights Watch described being excluded and ostracized, being targeted online, or being physically harassed. A 22-year-old lesbian woman recalled that once her sexual orientation became known at her secondary school, she was singled out for harassment and the students criticized her saying: ‘You are homosexual, you're dirty.’ A 22-year-old gay man, recalled that classmates in middle school used “gay” as a slur, targeting boys who were perceived to be gay. A 17-year-old girl recalled classmates saying that homosexuals should die. Students were also targeted if they were seen to be socializing too closely or intimately with same-sex peers.

A 2017 study exploring the rates of suicide ideation and attempts within Korean LGBT adolescents revealed that those youth who identified as homosexual or bisexual reported highest rates of suicidal ideation and medically serious attempts. Additional studies of suicide risk among youth revealed that LGBTQ youth in Korea experience extreme forms of bullying and discrimination that gives rise to higher rates of suicide attempts and risks.

Although many studies focus on discrimination that LGBTQ youths experience, discrimination based on sexual orientation or gender identity is not only faced by adolescents in Korea, but also by adults. A 2018 study revealed that 22.6% of LGB adults and 51.5% of transgender adults in Korea faced harsh discrimination and unfair treatment within the past year. Similarly, surveys conducted on LGBTQ adults in Korea reveal that the proportion of bisexual and lesbian women who reported having depressive symptoms was significantly higher than heterosexual women in Korea.

A 2022 study revealed that those who had past experience with bullying and discrimination because of their sexual identity had 1.65 times more occurrences of unrestful and poor sleep quality compared to those that have not faced discrimination against their sexual identity. Unhealthy sleep is known to perpetuate stress and depressive symptoms and thus it can be inferred that LGBTQ people who face discrimination are at higher risk of depression and stress/anxiety.

=== Identity affirming spaces ===
In recent years, the combination of taboo, consumer capitalism, and gay-led gentrification (the so-called "gaytrification effect") of the Itaewon area has pushed new gay commercialization outside of Itaewon, while isolating those places remaining. This lack of visibility is also reflected in the low profile maintained by the few gay clubs in South Korea. There are a few in metropolitan areas, especially in the section known as "Homo-hill".

Jong-no has various underground gay-friendly shops, cafés, and gay-focused NGOs. However, most of these establishments do not cater to foreign residents, trans people or women. A recent 2017 study insinuated the growth of a "gay lifestyle" community in Jong-no, a popular area in Seoul, where LGBTQ individuals feel safe in relatively heteronormative places. Though the study only looked at a well-known café, the Gay Bean, there are many other places in the Jong-no area that are considered straight but are growing increasingly welcoming of non-straight individuals.

=== Media ===
South Korea's first gay-themed magazine, Buddy, launched in 1998, and several popular gay-themed commercials have also aired.

In 1998, the film review authorities lifted a ban on portraying homosexual conduct in films.

Paving the way for television was the 2005 South Korean film The King and the Clown, a gay-themed movie based on a court affair between a king and his male jester. The movie became the highest-grossing in Korean film history, surpassing both Silmido and Taegukgi. The Korean title for The King and the Clown is "왕의 남자" which translates as "The King's Man" with the implication that it refers to the man as being the King's lover. Other recent movies include the 2008 film A Frozen Flower (Korean: 쌍화점) and No Regret (Korean: 후회하지 않아) by celebrated director Leesong hee-il, which starred at the 2006 Busan International Film Festival.

Mainstream Korean television shows have begun to feature gay characters and themes. In 2010, the soap opera Life Is Beautiful (Korean: 인생은 아름다워) premiered on SBS broadcast TV, becoming the first prime-time drama to explore a gay male couple's relationship as their unwitting families set them up on dates with women. That same year, Personal Taste (Korean: 개인의 취향, also "Personal Preference") was broadcast on MBC and revolved around a straight man who pretends to be gay to become a woman's roommate. Before these was Coming Out, which debuted on cable channel tvN in late-night in 2008, in which a gay actor and straight actress counseled gays with publicly acknowledging their sexual orientation.

Man on High Heels (Korean: 하이힐; RR: Hai hil; lit. "High Heel") is a 2014 South Korean noir film written and directed by Jang Jin, starring Cha Seung-won as a transgender homicide detective.

In 2017, the film Method was released. The film talks about a gay relationship between an actor and an idol. In 2020, the television series Itaewon Class began airing. The show prominently features a transgender supporting character played by actress Lee Joo-young, as well as cameo appearances by Hong Seok-cheon. This film reflects the increasingly favorable attitudes among South Koreans towards LGBTQ.

Openly LGBTQ entertainment figures include model and actress Harisu, a trans woman who makes frequent appearances on television. Actor Hong Seok-cheon, after coming out in 2000 and being fired from his job, has since returned to his acting career. He has appeared in several debate programs in support of gay rights.

Popular actor Kim Ji-hoo, who was openly gay, died of suicide by hanging on 8 October 2008. Police attributed his suicide to public prejudice against homosexuality.

"The Daughters of Bilitis", a KBS Drama Special about the lives of lesbian women, aired on 7 August 2011. Immediately after it aired, internet message boards lit up with outraged protesters who threatened to boycott the network. The production crew eventually shut down the online re-run service four days after the broadcast.

XY She, a KBS Joy cable talk show about male-to-female (MTF) transgender individuals, was virtually cancelled after its first episode due to public opposition. The network cited concern over attacks on MCs and other cast-members as the official reason for cancellation.

In 2013, movie director Kim Jho Kwang-soo and his partner Kim Seung-hwan became the first South Korean gay couple to publicly wed, although it was not a legally recognized marriage.

In 2016, a Christian broadcasting company was sanctioned by the Korea Communications Standards Commission for broadcasting an anti-LGBTI interview on a radio program, in which the interviewee claimed that, if an "anti-discrimination law for LGBTI people" is passed, "pedophilia, bestiality, etc. will be legalized" and that South Korea "will become stricken with unspeakable diseases such as AIDS".

In March 2016, the K-pop girl group Mercury debuted with member Choi Han-bit, a transgender model, actress, and now singer. In January 2018, singer Holland became the first openly gay K-pop idol in South Korea to debut, releasing his song "Neverland".

In May 2020, multiple media outlets linked a cluster of COVID-19 cases to a gay bar in Seoul.

In September 2021, South Korean series Squid Game was released. It is Netflix's most-watched series, becoming the top-viewed program in 94 countries and attracting more than 142 million member households and amassing 1.65 billion viewing hours during its first four weeks from launch. The series received some criticism for its negative portrayal of homosexuality.

In September 2022, Squid Game actor Lee Jung-jae's homophobic comments resurfaced on the internet. The actor made history by becoming the first Asian to win Outstanding Lead Actor at the 2022 Emmy Awards.

=== Pride parades ===
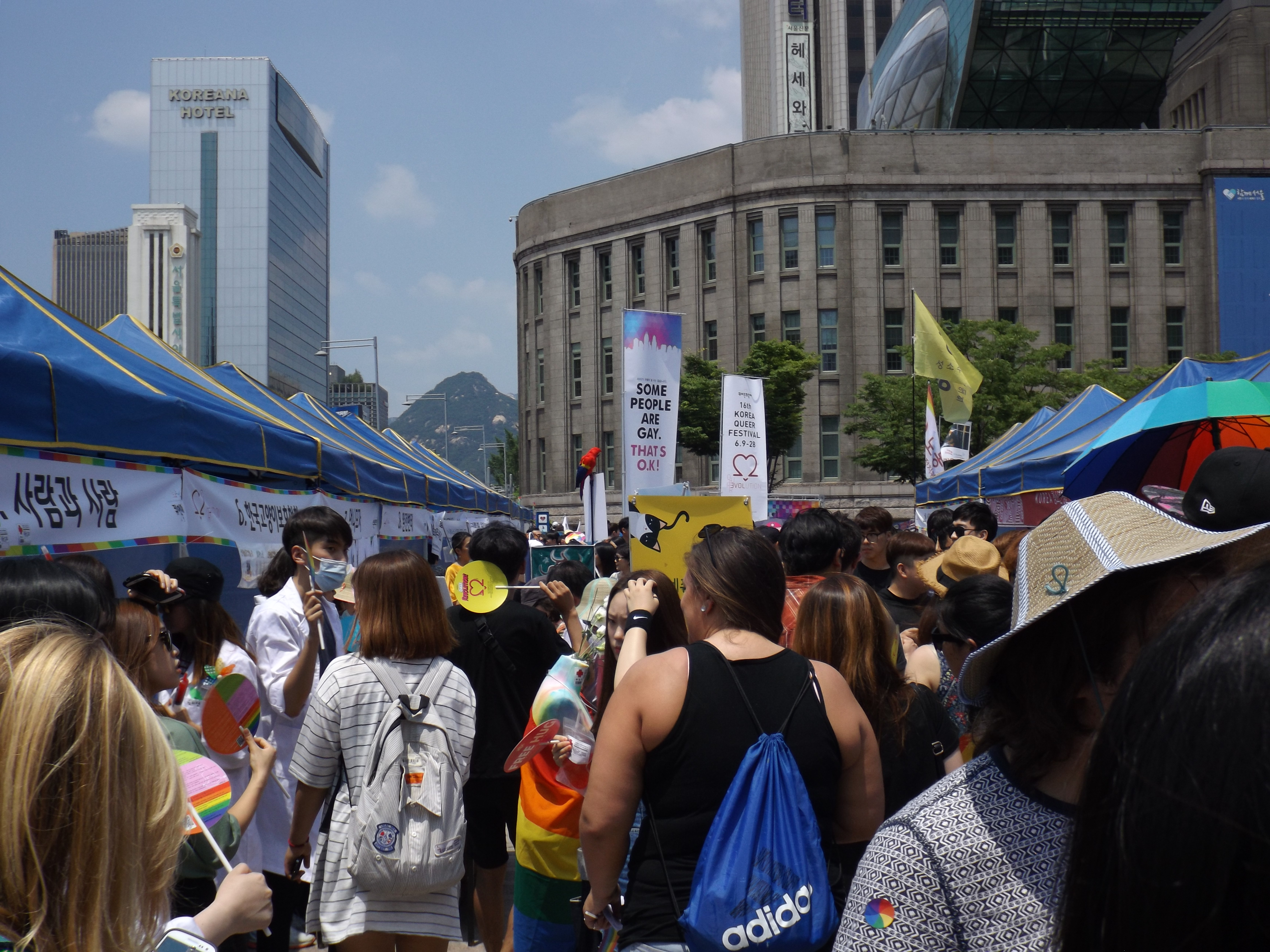
Seoul Pride parade 2015

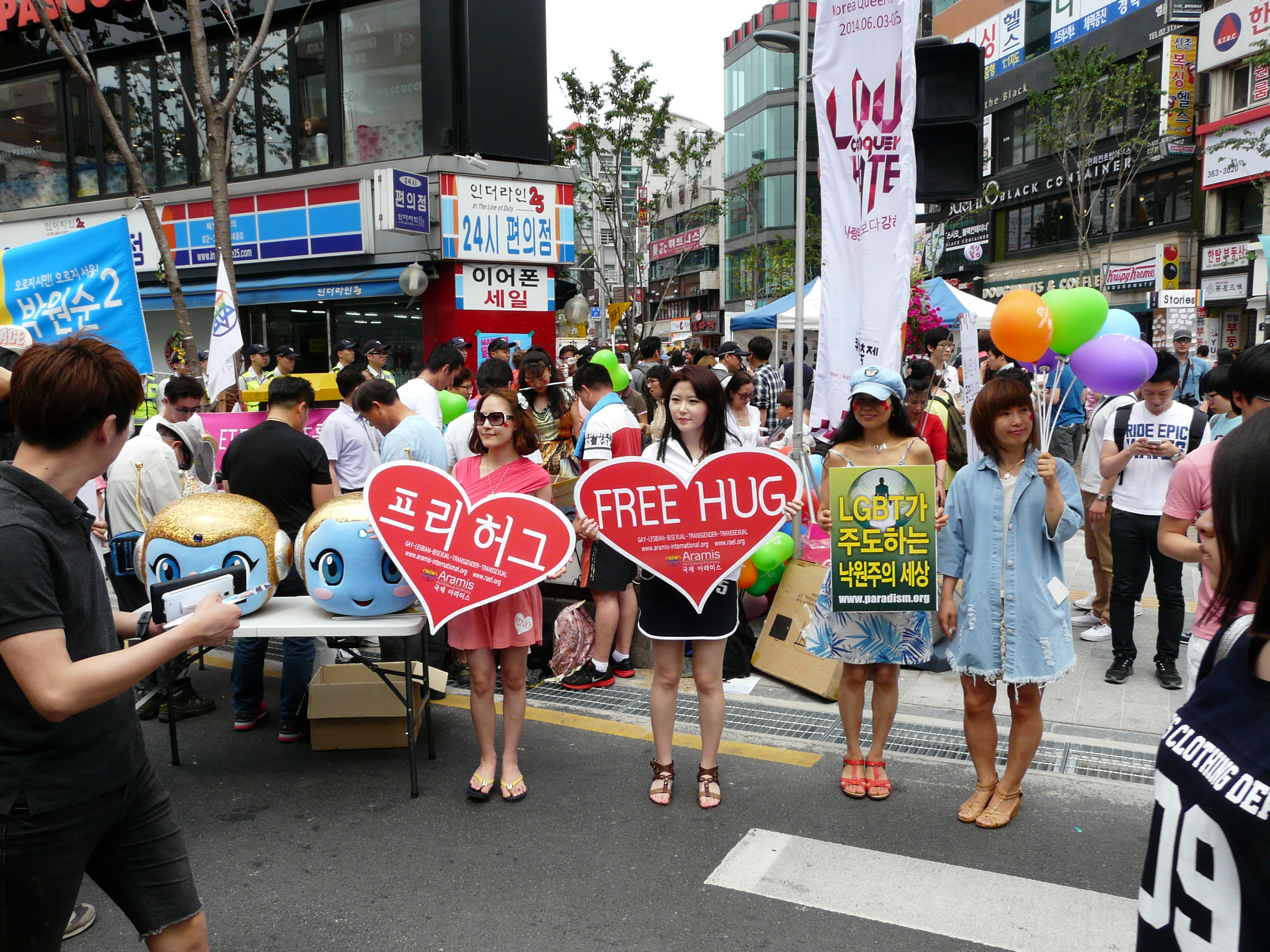
Participants at the 2014 Seoul Queer Culture Festival

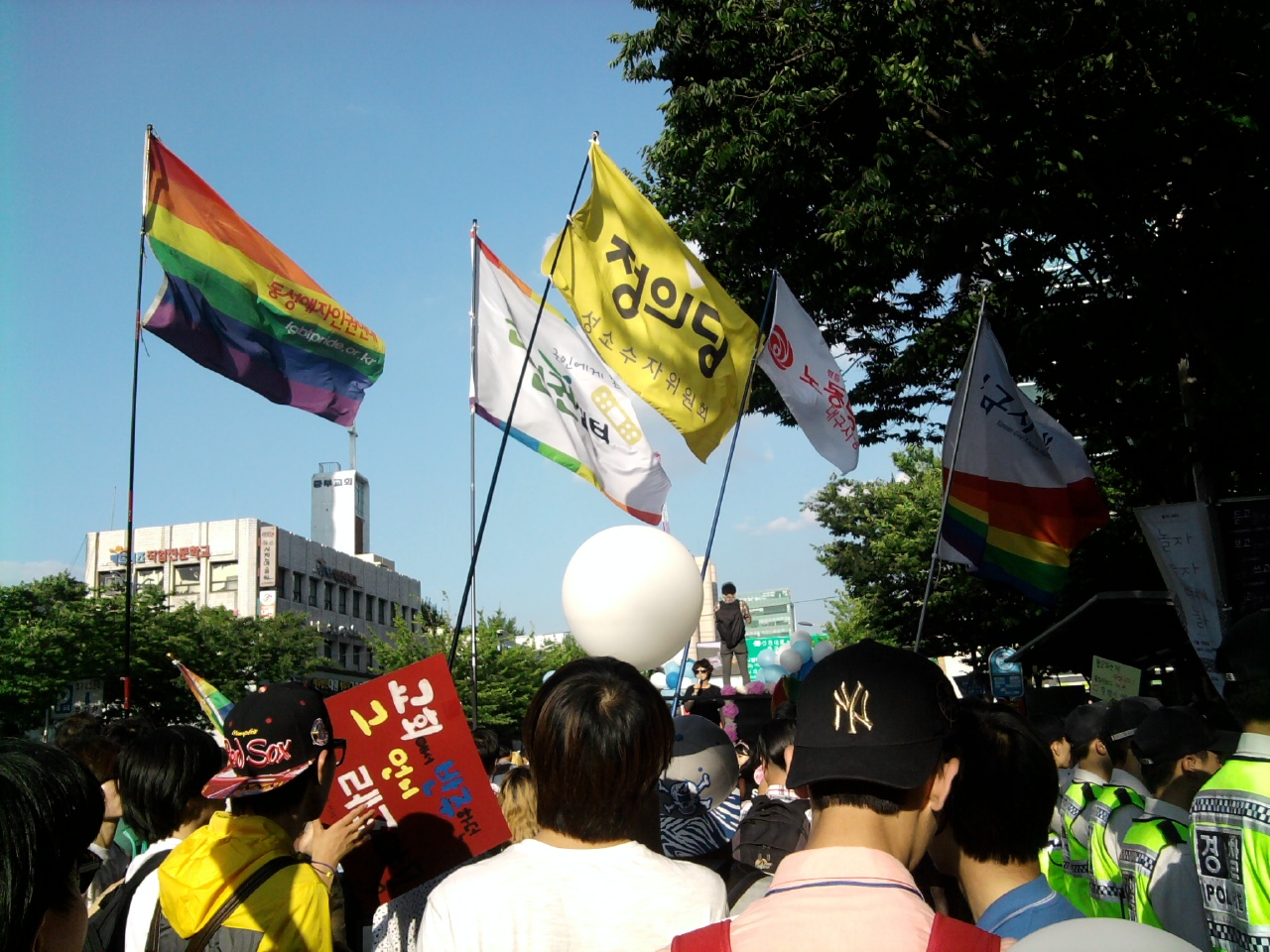
Daegu Pride parade 2014. On the right of the photograph are police officers. They were deployed to protect the participants as several protestors had tried to violently disrupt the event.

The Seoul Queer Culture Festival, also known as the "Korea Queer Culture Festival" or simply "Seoul Pride", is the largest LGBTQ event in the country. It was first held in 2000 when only 50 attended and turnout has increased every year since then. In 2015, following protests by conservative Christian groups, the Seoul Metropolitan Police Agency banned the event citing public safety concerns and traffic disruption as the reasons. The decision was overturned by the Seoul Administrative Court, allowing the parade to take place, which saw around 20,000 people participating.

In 2016, there were 50,000 attendees. In July 2017, an estimated 85,000 people (according to the organizers) marched in the streets of Seoul in support of LGBTQ rights. Ahead of the 2018 event, around 220,000 people signed an online petition demanding that officials act to prevent the festival from taking place. However, the 2018 Seoul Pride parade took place and was attended by an estimated 120,000 people.

In July 2019, conservative Christian groups again tried to block the festival, arguing that it "would be harmful to children and it would infringe on their rights". A court rejected their application as nonsensical. Days later, the 20th edition of the festival was held with approximately 150,000 participants.

Daegu has been holding annual pride marches since 2009, and Busan held its first pride event on 23 September 2017. In 2018, during the second gay pride in Busan, some 2,000 police officials were deployed to keep the event violence-free, and to protect the event's 15,000 attendees from violent anti-gay protesters. Gwangju and Jeju also held their first LGBTQ events in 2017. Gwangju's was a counter-protest to an anti-LGBTQ rally. The city organised its first official pride event the following year. Other cities, including Incheon and Jeonju, held their first pride events in 2018.

Incheon officials initially denied permission to hold the LGBTQ event, citing a lack of parking. Organizers lodged an appeal and vowed to march irrespectively. The event took place and ended in violence after about 1,000 Christian protestors began violently attacking the participants. In April 2019, organizers of the gay pride event in Incheon filed charges against several Christian pastors who violently disrupted the event. They also lodged complaints with South Korea's national human rights body accusing police of inaction.

In May 2018, the first drag parade in South Korea took place with dozens attending the incident-free protest march in the capital Seoul.

In 2020, three cities gave up holding Queer Culture Festival due to COVID-19. The new media startup 'Dotface' held a queer parade online. People participated by making their avatars through dotface's homepage and uploading the avatars on Instagram with hashtag #우리는없던길도만들지 #온라인퀴퍼 (online Queer Parade).

In May 2023, Seoul's city government blocked South Korea's annual LGBTQ festival from taking place outside city hall and granted a permit for an anti-LGBTQ Christian concert instead.

In June 2024, a protest against the Queer Culture Festival was held in central Seoul. Thousands of participants held blue flags and signs with phrases such as "No to homosexuality".

== Public opinion ==
Public opinion on same-sex marriage (2023) based on Pew Research Center
1. Strongly favor (12.0%)
2. Somewhat favor (29.0%)
3. Not sure (3.00%)
4. Somewhat oppose (19.0%)
5. Strongly oppose (37.0%)

Recent data suggests public support for the legalization of same-sex marriage in South Korea is shrinking. Two major 2025 opinion surveys confirm this trend. The Hankook Research poll showed support dropping from 36% in 2021 to 31% in 2025. A separate Gallup Korea survey reported 34% backing legalization compared to 58% opposition, returning support levels to where they stood nearly a decade ago. In 2010, 31% and 21% of South Koreans in their 20s and 30s, respectively, supported the legalization of same-sex marriages. In 2014, these numbers had almost doubled to 60% and 40%. Support among people over 60, however, remained relatively unchanged (14% to 15%). These numbers were published by the Asan Institute for Policy Studies.

A 2013 Gallup poll found that 39% of people believed homosexuality should be accepted by society, compared to only 18% who held this view in 2007. South Korea recorded the most significant shift towards greater acceptance of homosexuality among the 39 countries surveyed worldwide. Significantly, there was a very large age gap on this issue: in 2013, 71% of South Koreans aged between 18 and 29 believed that homosexuality should be accepted, compared to only 16% of South Koreans aged 50 and over.

In April 2013, a Gallup poll, which was commissioned by a conservative Christian group, found that 25% of South Koreans supported same-sex marriage, while 67% opposed it and 8% did not know or refused to answer. However, a May 2013 Ipsos poll found that 26% of respondents were in favor of same-sex marriage and another 31% supported other forms of recognition for same-sex couples.

A 2017 Gallup Korea poll found that 58% of Koreans were against same-sex marriage, while 34% supported it and 8% remained undecided. Another poll in December 2017 conducted by Gallup for MBC and the Speaker of the National Assembly reported that 41% of South Koreans thought that same-sex marriage should be allowed, 53% were against it.

In February 2019, the "2018 Korea Social Integration Survey", which was conducted by the Korea Institute of Public Administration, revealed that those who said they "cannot accept homosexuals" fell below 50% for the first time in the survey's history. This percentage decreased from 62% in 2013 to 57% in 2017, to 49% in 2018. In 2018, the rest of those interviewed answered that they could accept them as either neighbors (31%), colleagues (15%), close friends (6%), or spouses (0.4%).

A 2019 survey of 500 Korean respondents found that a majority had a favorable view of transgender people, and that they did not violate Korean traditional cultural values. Most supported gender-affirming care for trans people, however a majority still agreed that they should not be allowed to serve in the military.

A 2020 Pew Research Center poll showed that 44% of South Koreans believed society should accept homosexuality. South Korea recorded the largest generational gap of the 34 countries surveyed, with 79% of 18–29-year-olds agreeing but only 23% of those aged 50 and over. Women (51%), the more educated (51%), those on the left of the political spectrum (67%), and the religiously unaffiliated (60%) were also more likely to agree.

According to a poll in May 2021, 81% of the respondents said no to the question "Is it fair to fire a worker based on their sexuality?" and 12% said yes. In terms of marriage equality, 38% were in favour of same-sex marriage while 52% were against it.

According to a 2022 survey by the World Values Survey, 79% of South Koreans "would not like to have homosexuals as neighbors".

In a 2023 Pew Research Center survey, 41% of South Korean respondents supported same-sex marriage while 56% were opposed. There was an extreme difference in opinion based on the ages of the South Korean respondents. While only 32% of South Koreans over the age of 40 supported gay marriage, 58% of South Koreans aged 18–39 supported it.

A Hankook Research survey of 1,000 South Korean nationals in 2025 put support for legally recognizing same-sex marriage in South Korea at 31%, while 55% of respondents indicated that they oppose (14% stated they were unsure). This marked a 5% rise in opposition since Hankook Research's survey on the same issue in 2024 and a 3% drop in support.

Gallup Korea's "Social Perception of Homosexuality" survey has been tracking South Korean's attitudes regarding same-sex marriage since 2001. Its 2025 survey indicated that 58% of South Korean's oppose legalizing same-sex marriage, while 34% support legalizing same-sex marriage. Its 2025 survey breakdown by age on support for legalizing same-sex marriage was as follows:

- 20s: 49% support
- 30s: 44% support
- 40s: 46% support
- 50s: 28% support
- 60s: 22% support
- 70+: 19% support

According to a 2025 data from the Pew Research Center, 56% of South Koreans view homosexuality as "morally unacceptable." This figure is significantly higher than in many other developed countries, such as Japan (21%) or Spain (7%).

== Politics ==
In the 2008 legislative election, Choi Hyun-sook became the first openly LGBTQ parliamentary candidate in the country. As an openly lesbian candidate, she ran for the New Progressive Party. Her party did not win any seats during the election.

The United Future Party is opposed to LGBTQ rights, the Seoul Queer Culture Festival, anti-discrimination protections for LGBTQ people and same-sex marriage. Some of its members have made many public homophobic statements.

Political support for LGBTQ rights is limited in South Korea due to the significant lobbying power exerted by conservative Christian groups. Support for LGBTQ rights is limited even from the otherwise progressive Democratic Party of Korea and its leader, former human rights lawyer and South Korean President Moon Jae-in. During the 2017 presidential election, in which he emerged victorious, Moon stated that he opposed homosexuality, and that gay soldiers could undermine the Korean military.

Moon faced criticism from gay rights advocates for his inconsistent position on minority rights, given that he was prepared to backtrack on previous support for civil unions and sacrifice LGBTQ rights in order to win votes from conservative Christian voters. Moon later said that he opposed same-sex marriage while also opposing discrimination against homosexual people. Only one of the 14 presidential candidates in 2017, the Justice Party's Sim Sang-jung, expressed clear support for LGBTQ rights and introducing discrimination protections for LGBTQ people.

During South Korea's 2018 elections, openly transgender candidate Kim Ki-hong (김기홍) ran for a seat in the National Assembly of South Korea. Kim ran again under the Green Party Korea in 2020 for the National Assembly of South Korea. Due to transphobic abuse Kim endured during the campaign, they decided to end their life on February 24, 2021.

During the 2019 Seoul Queer Culture Festival, the Justice Party and the Green Party participated in the event. Some members of the ruling Democratic Party of Korea (DPK) also participated, including Keum Tae-sup. This is believed to be the first participation of the DPK at the event.

In October 2019, speaking to Buddhist and Christian religious leaders, President Moon Jae-in said, "A national consensus should be the priority for same-sex marriage. However, regarding the human rights of sexual minorities, they should not be socially persecuted or discriminated against."

On 12 September 2024, President Yoon Suk-yeol appointed Ahn Chang-ho as chairperson of the government's National Human Rights Commission, despite strong opposition from civil society groups and his concerning confirmation hearing, bypassing the National Assembly's approval process. A former Constitutional Court justice, Ahn has drawn widespread criticism for his opposition to antidiscrimination protections for LGBTQ people, claiming antidiscrimination protections spread HIV/AIDS and anal cancer, and suggesting that homosexuality could lead to a communist revolution.

=== Collusion between politics and Protestantism ===
South Korea's two major political parties (People Power Party, Democratic Party of Korea) are very conscious of the votes of South Korean Protestant voters, similar to Russia, the Orthodox country. This has led to South Korean politics neglecting LGBTQ rights and reluctance to enact anti-discrimination laws. Because, South Korea has adopted a single-member district system without a two-round system for its National Assembly elections. This is advantageous for conservative South Korean Protestants, who can leverage their strong unity to push through their agenda. Especially in areas like Gyeonggi Province and Seoul, where margins of victory can be as small as 1%, 2%, or 3%, South Korean Christian groups are highly organised and powerful. Therefore, campaigning to defeat a candidate would inevitably jeopardize their own political careers, forcing them to adopt a passive stance. However, Protestantism in United States, the origin of South Korea Protestantism, has long since changed. In the United States, many theological seminaries have LGBTQ students, faculty, deans, and others, coexisting with churches.

== Censorship issues ==
The Government of South Korea practiced censorship of gay content websites from 2001 to 2003, through its Information and Communications Ethics Committee (정보통신윤리위원회), an official organ of the Ministry of Information and Communication. That practice has since been ended.

The South Korean Government has been criticized for the lack of protection for LGBTQ people. As of 2020, South Korea has no national law preventing discrimination on the basis of sexual orientation, which places it at the bottom of the list of OECD countries in regard to LGBTQ rights. In addition, South Korea's aggressive track and test method to the COVID-19 pandemic resulted in several LGBTQ South Koreans being outed by either the press or by the public government records related to testing. A cluster of cases was linked to a gay bar in Seoul in May 2020, with all of those in attendance having their personal characteristics, and in some cases also their occupation, released to the public.

In a country with no protections, the idea of being listed in public government records as LGBTQ is "insurmountable" and can lead to "long-term negative social effects". Several LGBTQ people who had visited the bar decided not to report their positive COVID status. Government officials announced anonymous testing procedures later that month. Several COVID clusters were also linked to notoriously homophobic Christian churches or organizations.

In November 2024, Meta was fined $15 million for illegally selling and distributing sexual orientation information of users on Facebook - breaching their privacy.

== Summary table ==
Same-sex sexual activity legal (for the general public)	Yes
Same-sex sexual activity legal (for military conscripts)	No (Punishable by up to two years in prison)
Equal age of consent (16)	Yes
Anti-discrimination laws in employment	No / Yes (In some jurisdictions)
Anti-discrimination laws in the provision of goods and services	No / Yes (In some jurisdictions)
Anti-discrimination laws in all other areas (incl. indirect discrimination, hate speech)	No
Hate crime laws include sexual orientation and gender identity	No
Same-sex marriages	No
Recognition of same-sex couples	No
Stepchild adoption by same-sex couples	No
Joint adoption by same-sex couples	No
Adoption by single people regardless of sexual orientation	No
LGBTQ people allowed to serve openly in the military	No
Right to change legal gender	Yes (Since 2006; requires medical transition)
Legal recognition of non-binary gender	No
Third gender option	No
Gender self-identification	No
Intersex minors protected from invasive surgical procedures	No
Conversion therapy banned by law	No
Gay panic defense banned by law	No
Access to IVF for lesbians	No
Automatic parenthood for both spouses after birth	No
Altruistic surrogacy for gay male couples	No
MSM allowed to donate blood	Yes / No (One year deferral period for all regardless of sexual orientation)

== See also ==
- Chingusai
- LGBTQI health in South Korea
- Recognition of same-sex unions in South Korea
- Solidarity for LGBT Human Rights of Korea
- Yun Hyon-seok

General:

- Human rights in South Korea
- LGBT rights in Asia
