= Article 92-6 of South Korea Military Penal Code =

Military rule prohibiting anal sex

Article 92-6 of South Korea Military Penal Code or Article 92-6 of Republic of Korea Military Criminal Act is a law that punishes anal sex and other indecent acts with imprisonment for not more than two years.

== Text ==
Original text(Korean)	English Translation
제92조의6(추행) 제1조제1항부터 제3항까지에 규정된 사람에 대하여 항문성교나 그 밖의 추행을 한 사람은 2년 이하의 징역에 처한다.	Article 92-6 (Indecent Act) A person who commits anal intercourse with any person prescribed in Article 1 (1) through (3) or any other indecent act shall be punished by imprisonment with labor for not more than two years.

The term "any person prescribed in Article 1 (1) through (3)" means a person under the following provisions:

Original text(Korean)	English Translation
제1조(적용대상자): 1. 이 법은 이 법에 규정된 죄를 범한 대한민국 군인에게 적용한다.; 2. 제1항에서 "군인"이란 현역에 복무하는 장교, 준사관, 부사관 및 병(兵)을 말한다. 다만, 전환복무(轉換服務) 중인 병은 제외한다.; 3. 다음 각 호의 어느 하나에 해당하는 사람에 대하여는 군인에 준하여 이 법을 적용한다.; 1. 군무원; 2. 군적(軍籍)을 가진 군(軍)의 학교의 학생·생도와 사관후보생·부사관후보생 및 「병역법」 제57조에 따른 군적을 가지는 재영(在營) 중인 학생; 3. 소집되어 실역(實役)에 복무하고 있는 예비역·보충역 및 전시근로역인 군인	Article 1 (Persons subject to Application of this Act): 1. This Act shall apply to military persons of the Republic of Korea who perpetrate a crime specified in this Act.; 2. The term "military person" in paragraph (1) means any officer, warrant officer, noncommissioned officer, and enlisted soldier who is in active service: Provided, That any enlisted soldier in secondment service shall be excluded herefrom.; 3. This Act shall apply to any of the following persons as a military person: <Amended on May 29, 2016>; 1. A civilian military employee; 2. A student who is registered in the military register and is currently enrolled in a military school, an officer candidate, a noncommissioned officer candidate, or a student who is registered in the military service pursuant to Article 57 of the Military Service Act and is currently serving military service at a military base; 3. A military person in reserve service or recruit service who has been called up and is currently serving in the military or a wartime worker.

== History ==
Article 92 of the Korean Military Penal Code, enacted in 1962, has provisions to punish "sodomy" and other obscene acts.This clause is based on the Defense Security Act promulgated during the U.S. military administration in 1948. The term "sodomy" in Article 50 of the Defense Security Act was also translated when it was enacted under "Article 50 of the Art of War" in 1920.

- 1948: The National Defense Security Act was enacted.Article 50 of the Defense Security Act has a clause called "Sodomy"
- 1962: The Defense Security Law was abolished, and the Korean Military Penal Code was enacted. Article 92 stipulates that "A person who commits sodomy or other disgraceful conduct shall be punished by imprisonment with prison labor for not more than 1 year"
- 2009: Article 92 "A person who commits sodomy or other disgraceful conduct shall be punished by imprisonment with prison labor for not more than 1 year" was moved to Article 92-5 and revised to "A person who commits sodomy or other disgraceful conduct shall be punished by imprisonment with prison labor for not more than 2 years"
- 2013: Article 92-5 "A person who commits sodomy or other disgraceful conduct shall be punished by imprisonment with prison labor for not more than 2 years" has been revised to Article 92-6 and "A person who commits anal intercourse with any person prescribed in Article 1 (1) through (3) or any other indecent act shall be punished by imprisonment with labor for not more than 2 years"

== See also ==
- Sexual orientation and gender identity in the South Korean military
- LGBT rights in South Korea
- Sodomy law
- Homophobia
