= Chun Ha-ram =

South Korean politician (born 1986)

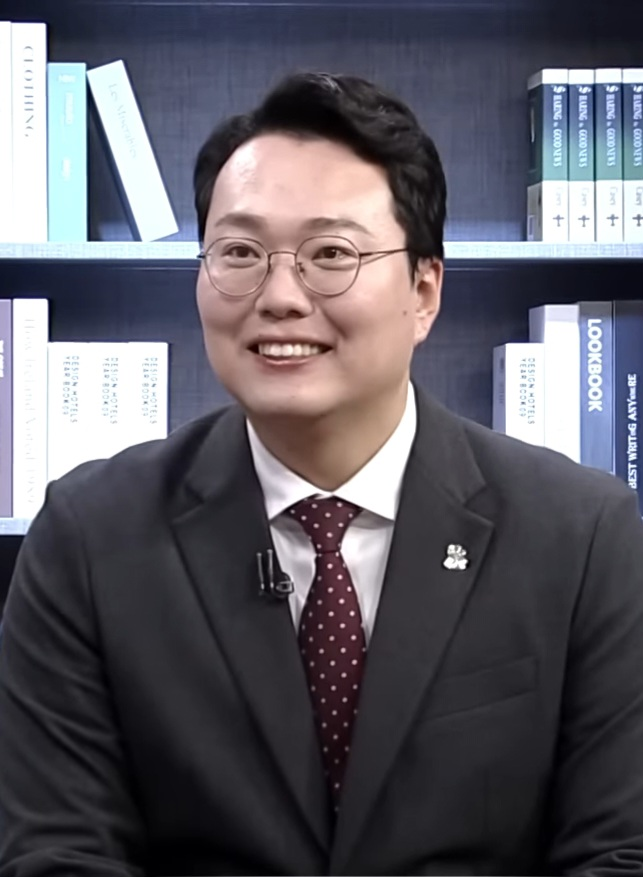
- Chun in 2023

Acting Leader of the Reform Party
- In office 26 August 2026 – 14 September 2026
- Preceded by: Lee Jun-seok
- Succeeded by: Lee Ki-in (ERC)
- In office 12 February 2025 – 27 July 2025
- Preceded by: Her Eun-a
- Succeeded by: Lee Jun-seok

Member of the National Assembly
- Incumbent
- Assumed office 30 May 2024
- Constituency: Proportional representation

Personal details
- Born: 10 July 1986 (age 40)
- Party: Reform (since 2023)

Korean name
- Hangul: 천하람
- RR: Cheon Haram
- MR: Ch'ŏn Haram

Chun Ha-ram (Korean: 천하람; born 10 July 1986) is a South Korean politician serving as a member of the National Assembly since 2024. He has served as the acting leader of the Reform Party since August to September 2026 and from February to July 2025.
