= Keum Tae-sup =

South Korean politician (born 1967)

- 금태섭
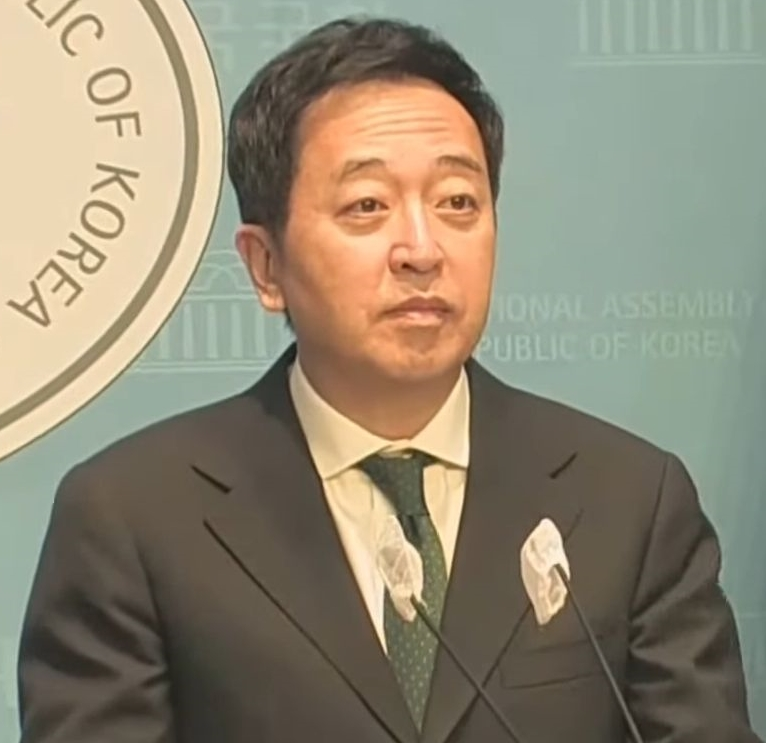

Member of the National Assembly
- In office 30 May 2016 – 29 May 2020
- Preceded by: Shin Ki-nam
- Succeeded by: Kang Sun-woo
- Constituency: Seoul Gangseo A

Co-leader of New Choice Party
- In office 17 December 2023 – February 2024 Serving with Cho Seong-ju
- Preceded by: Office established
- Succeeded by: Jeong Ho-hee (acting); Office abolished

Personal details
- Born: 29 September 1967 (age 59) Seoul, South Korea
- Party: Independent
- Other political affiliations: Democratic (2014–2020); New Choice (2023–2024); New Reform (2024)
- Education: Seoul National University; Cornell University

Korean name
- Hangul: 금태섭
- Hanja: 琴泰燮
- RR: Geum Taeseop
- MR: Kŭm T'aesŏp

Keum Tae-sup (Korean: 금태섭, born 29 September 1967) is a South Korean politician and lawyer. He had been a member of the National Assembly from 2016 to 2020. Although he had been a member of the Democratic Party of Korea since entering politics, he was disciplined for opposing the party's opinion on the establishment of the Corruption Investigation Office for High-ranking Officials, and defected from the party in 2020. He founded New Choice in 2023 and then merged with Lee Jun-seok's New Reform Party in the face of the National Assembly election.

He has advocated for LGBTQ rights in South Korea. He participated in the Seoul Queer Culture Festival in 2018.

== Early life ==
Keum was born in Seoul on 29 September 1967. His father, Keum Byeong-hun, was a judge, but was forced to resign after a judicial scandal in 1971. He passed the bar exam in 1992 after graduating from Yeouido High School and Seoul National University Law School.

When he was a prosecutor, he promoted the suspect's legally guaranteed rights through a column titled "How to get investigated properly" published in The Hankyoreh newspaper in 2006. However, he quit his job as a prosecutor and worked as a lawyer after stopping the series due to pressure from the prosecution.

== Political career ==
In 2012, Keum entered politics by legally supporting Ahn Cheol-soo's presidential campaign. He served as spokesman for the main opposition New Politics Alliance for Democracy (NPAD) during 2014. He remained in the Democratic Party when Ahn founded the People Party and left the NPAD.

In the 2016 parliamentary election, he ran in the Gangseo A constituency and won the election by beating Saenuri Party candidate Ku Sang-chan.

=== Defection from DPK ===
On 30 December 2019, Keum was the only one to abstain from legislation to establish the Corruption Investigation Office for High-ranking Officials, which his party decided to approve as a party platform. Later, some party members submitted a request for disciplinary action against him, and he was issued a warning on 25 May 2020. He requested a retrial, saying that it would be against the Constitution that other opinions in the vote would be grounds for disciplinary action, but the DPK leadership did not conclude.

On 21 October 2020, Keum defected from the Democratic Party of Korea. He cited his disciplinary action as the reason for leaving the party. He also criticized the DPK for its "shameless behavior of flip-flopping", saying it has lost its old flexibility and communication culture.

=== As an independent ===
While working as an independent politician, he tended to cooperate with conservative parties, frequently criticizing the DPK. He announced his candidacy for the Seoul mayoral by-election on 31 January 2021, but lost to Ahn Cheol-soo in the primary to select a single candidate for a third party.

=== New Reform Party ===
On 8 December 2023, Keum announced the creation of a new political party, New Choice, with Ryu Ho-jeong, a member of the Justice Party. He held a joint foundation contest on December 17 and announced that his goal is to win 30 seats in the 2024 election.

On 9 February 2024, his party merged with the New Reform Party led by Lee Jun-seok. In the 2024 election, he ran in the Jongno constituency as a member of the New Reform Party, but finished third with 3.22% of the vote.

On 3 November 2024, Keum left the New Reform Party to run for president of the Korean Bar Association. Election day was January 20, 2025, but Keum unified with another candidate, Ahn Byung-hee, on January 13.

== Election history ==
Year	Elections	Constituency	Party affiliation	Votes (%)	Results
2016	20th General Election	Gangseo A (Seoul)	Democratic	37,649 (37.24%)	Won
2024	22nd General Election	Jongno (Seoul)	New Reform	2,835 (3.22%)	Lost (3rd)

National Assembly of the Republic of Korea
Preceded by Shin Ki-nam	Member of the National Assembly for Seoul Gangseo A 2016–2020	Succeeded by Kang Sun-woo
