= Jang Hye-young =

South Korean politician (born 1987)

- 장혜영
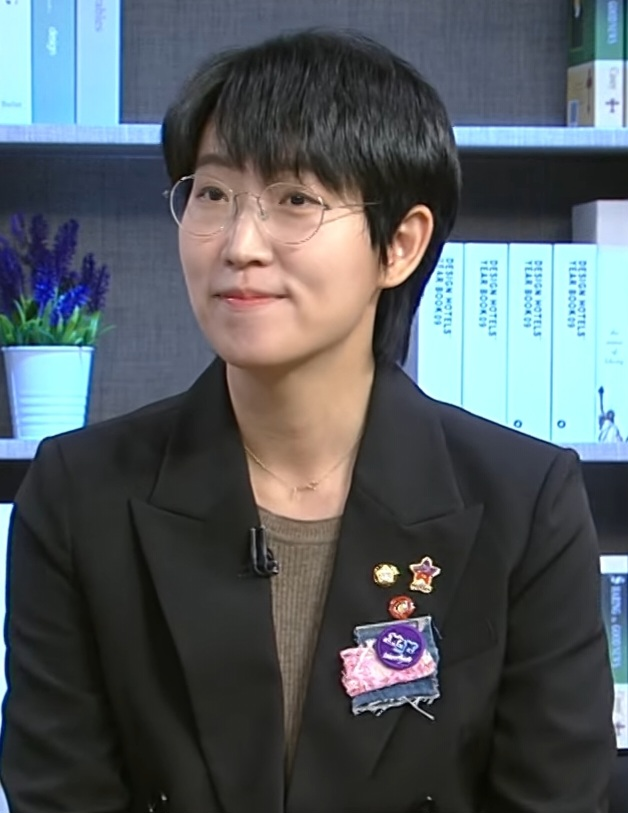
- Jang Hye-Yeong

Member of the National Assembly
- In office 30 May 2020 – 30 May 2024
- Constituency: Proportional representation

Personal details
- Born: 8 April 1987 (age 39) Seoul
- Party: Justice Party
- Education: Korea Animation High School
- Website: janghyeyeong.com

Jang Hye-young (Korean: 장혜영; Hanja: 張惠英; born 8 April 1987) is a South Korean politician and human rights activist for the disabled and the LGBTQ+ community. She is a former lawmaker and has proposed anti-discrimination laws. Jang has an autistic sister. In 2018, she released a documentary about their shared life together. Jang is a member of the progressive Justice Party of Korea.

She was selected for the Time 100 Next 2021.

== Early life ==
Jang Hye-Yeong was born in South Korea. Jang grew up with an autistic sister. Her mother received little to no support in caring for her disabled child from the government or those around her, and ultimately the family decided to place the child in an institution. According to Jang, her sister was mistreated and abused there. Shortly afterwards, Jang's mother left her family and her father sent her to stay under the care of her grandparents. The childhood trauma that Jang faced ultimately pushed her to become an activist. In 2011, Jang made the decision to drop out of the highly prestigious Yonsei University to take care of her younger sister, 18 years after she had been placed in the institution.

== Filmography ==
In 2018, Jang decided to release a documentary called Grown Up. The documentary details the first few months of her life living with and caring for her sister, who has severe developmental delays.

Year	Title
2018	Grown Up (어른이 되면)

== Political career ==
Jang is a member of the left-wing progressive Justice Party. Jang, at just age 35, is one of the South Korea's youngest ever lawmakers. Jang has made many efforts to ensure the rights of disabled people and members of the LGBT community. She joined the Korean National Assembly in 2020. The same year Jang made headlines when she claimed sexual harassment by former party leader, Kim Jong-Cheol. Kim admitted to the assault and resigned from his position.

On 28 November 2023, Jang announced that she had informally left the Justice Party. Jang said she is only maintaining Party membership to keep her seat as a proportional representative. In Korean election law, if a member of Parliament elected through proportional representation leaves the party, they also lose their seat as an elected lawmaker. Jang rejected the Party's plan to create an electoral alliance of left-wing parties agreed by the Justice Party and the Green Party. Jang and fellow Justice Party member of parliament Ryu Ho-jeong have expressed interest in creating an alliance called the Third Power. The two Justice Party lawmakers have stated that "progressive politics alone have failed" and aim to bring together all political factions that are opposed to the Democratic Party and the People Power Party. This includes Yang Hyang-ja's centrist science politics party, Hope of Korea, and Keum Tae-seop's liberal party, A New Choice.

On the morning of 30 November 2023, Jang Hye-young announced her departure from Third Power and return to the Justice Party. The reason given for her departure are unclear, but it comes after right-wing politicians in Third Power used sexist language to criticize a strike that was ongoing of female game developers due to gender-based discrimination in video game development.
