= Korea Animation High School =

Public school in Hanam, South Korea

- 한국애니메이션고등학교
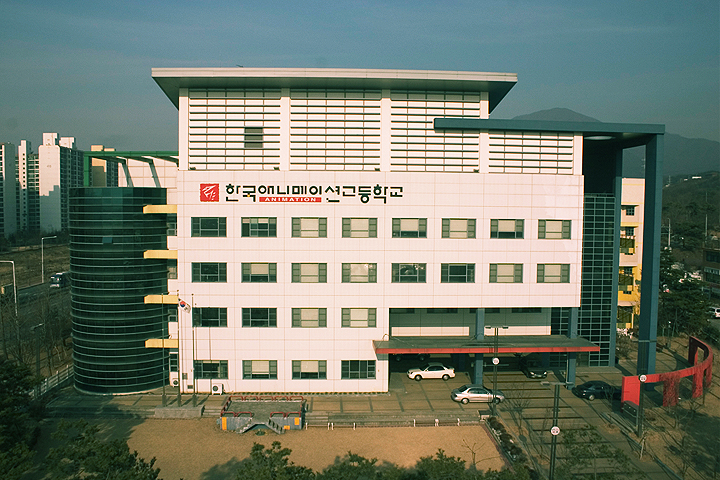

Location
- 223 Geomdansanno, 523-4 Changu-dong, Hanam, Gyeonggi Province; South Korea
- Coordinates: 37°32′06″N 127°13′38″E

Information
- Type: Public
- Motto: Faster, Newer, Wider (바르게 새롭게 너르게)
- Established: 18 January 2000
- Principal: Choi Chang-soo (최창수)
- Deputy Principal: Lee Yoon-soon (이윤순)
- Faculty: 48
- Enrollment: 307
- Colors: Red, white, and black
- Website: http://www.anigo.or.kr/

Korea Animation High School (Korean: 한국애니메이션고등학교; RR: Hanguk Aenimeisyeon Godeunghakgyo), colloquially known as Anigo (애니고) in South Korea, is a public characterized vocational secondary school in Hanam, South Korea, hosting the last three grades of secondary education in Korea. It was opened in 2000 with three educational goals: freedom, creativity, and inner beauty.

== History ==
Korea Animation High School took in their first batch of 101 students on March 8, 2000. Current principal Choi Chang-soo was appointed on March 1, 2011, as the 6th principal of the school. As of February 2, 2015, there are a total of 1273 graduates. March 3, 2015 marked the new student admissions for the 2015 school year, with 103 students.

== Departments ==
- Comics & Cartoon (만화창작과)
- Animation (애니메이션과)
- Film Production (영상연출과)
- Computer Game Production (컴퓨터게임제작과)

== Principals ==
List of principals of Korea Animation High School:

- 1st: Hwang Seon-gil (2000.04.17—2001.09.01)
- 2nd: Park Kyung-sam (2001.09.01—2002.04.08)
- 3rd: Kim Joo-young (2002.04.08—2004.09.01)
- 4th: Jeong Sun-gak (2004.09.01—2008.09.01)
- 5th: Choi Nak-seong (2008.09.01—2011.03.01)
- 6th: Choi Chang-soo (2011.03.01—present)

== Notable alumni ==
- Choi Chang-yeop, actor
