= New Choice =

2023-2024 political party in South Korea

New Choice 새로운선택
- Leader: Keum Tae-sup; Cho Seong-ju
- General Secretary: Jeong Ho-hee
- Founded: December 11, 2023
- Dissolved: April 23, 2024
- Split from: Democratic Party of Korea; People Power Party; Justice Party
- Merged into: Reform Party
- Headquarters: Room 808, Geukdong VIP Building, 15-1 Gukhoe-daero 70-gil, Yeongdeungpo-gu, Seoul
- Membership: 6,836
- Ideology: Centrist reformism Big tent Factions: Social liberalism
- Political position: Centre
- Colours: Mint; Blue; Pink
- Slogan: 성숙한 대한민국을 만드는 중도 대연합 정당 ('A moderate grand coalition party creating a mature Republic of Korea')

Website
- www.newparty.kr (archived)

Korean name
- Hangul: 새로운선택
- RR: Saeroun seontaek
- MR: Saeroun sŏnt'aek

New Choice (Korean: 새로운선택) was a South Korean political party founded around Keum Tae-sup, who left the Democratic Party of Korea in 2023. On 9 February 2024, the party announced a merger with Lee Jun-seok's Reform Party. Candidates for the New Choice Party ran under the Reform Party banner in the 2024 South Korean legislative election, and the formal merger process was completed after the election.

== History ==
In December 2023 Keum Tae-sup, Cho Seong-ju, Ryu Ho-jeong and others from the Third Power group, who were critical of both the Democratic Party and the People Power Party founded the party. Their aim was to create a "third way" political party that included both progressive and conservative reformers. Keum Tae-sup and Cho Seong-ju were elected as co-chairs of the party. Ryu Ho-jeong joined the party but remained in the Justice Party to encourage others to join the new political project and to prevent the loss of her proportional representation seat in the National Assembly. Keum Tae-sup said the party wanted to gain 30 seats in the 2024 South Korean legislative election.

In some party material on YouTube a cartoon character appeared, first in the video titled "탄핵 중독, 치료법이 있다" (Impeachment Addiction: There Is a Cure) and subsequently appeared in later videos too.
