= Ryu Ho-jeong =

South Korean politician (born 1992)

- 류호정
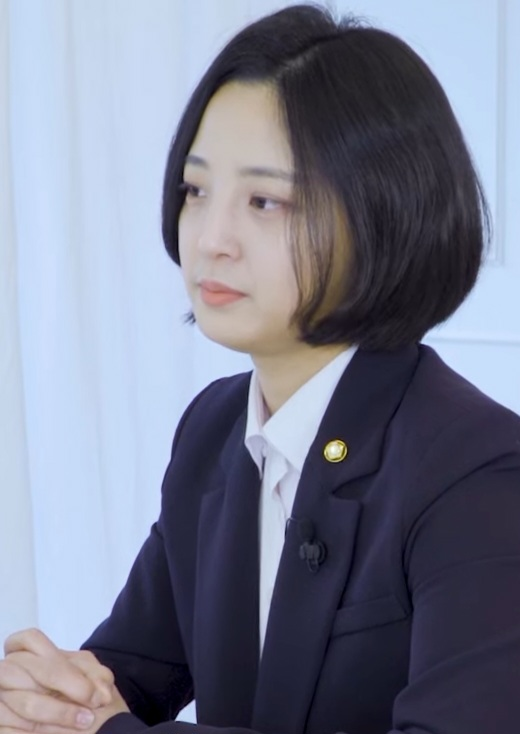
- Ryu Ho-jeong in 2023

Member of the National Assembly
- In office 30 May 2020 – 15 January 2024
- Constituency: Proportional representation

Personal details
- Born: 9 August 1992 (age 34) Changwon, South Gyeongsang, South Korea
- Party: Independent
- Other political affiliations: Justice (2017–2024); New Choice (2024); Reform (2024–2025)
- Education: Ewha Womans University

Korean name
- Hangul: 류호정
- RR: Ryu Hojeong
- MR: Ryu Hojŏng

Ryu Ho-jeong (Korean: 류호정; born 9 August 1992) is a former South Korean politician. She was a member of the National Assembly representing the Justice Party. She was elected for the first time in the 2020 election via proportional representation in first position on her party's list, and was the youngest member of the National Assembly in the 2020–2024 term.

== Early life and education ==
Ryu Ho-jeong was born in Changwon, South Gyeongsang Province in 1992. She attended Changwon Kyungil Girls' High before studying at Ewha Womans University from 2011 to 2016, earning a bachelor's degree in sociology.

While at Ewha Womans University, Ryu was president of "Klass Ewha", an esports game club. In 2014, she also admitted to having "boosted" her account in League of Legends, a video game especially popular in South Korea, by allowing other players to share the account to raise it to a higher rank or status. Account boosting is taken much more seriously in South Korea than in other places, and has since been outlawed there.

== Career ==
Ryu started her career as a Twitch streamer and online broadcaster before becoming active in politics. She was later a delegate to the Justice Party national congress in November 2018. From 2018 to 2020 she was director of the public relations department at the National Chemical Fiber Food Industry Union. In July 2019, Ryu became vice chair of the Seongnam City branch of the Justice Party. At the end of the 2020, she became director of public relations strategy and vice-president of the national party.

In the 2020 legislative election, Ryu was elected to the National Assembly via the proportional representation component, despite adverse publicity about her previous esport game account boosting. She was top candidate of the Justice Party's proportional list; the party won six seats overall, and 2.7 million votes (9.7%). At age 27, she became the youngest member of the National Assembly, in which she is a member of the Special Committee on Ethics and the Trade, Industry, Energy, SMEs, and Startups Committee.

In August 2020, Ryu was subject to online abuse after wearing a red patterned mini wrap dress and black sneakers in the National Assembly chamber. Critics derided her appearance and claimed that her outfit was inappropriate. She was defended by a number of other politicians and public figures, including former presidential spokesperson Ko Min-jung, who commended her for "breaking the National Assembly's excessively solemn and authoritarian atmosphere". In an interview with Yonhap, Ryu explained: "In every plenary session, most lawmakers, male and middle-aged, show up in a suit and a tie, so I wanted to shatter that tradition. The authority of the national assembly is not built on those suits." The incident played into the ongoing reckoning over sexism and gender equality in South Korea.

Ryu Ho-jeong raised further controversy with the campaign about the right to practice tattooing, a matter on which history weighs heavily in Korea (Note: The Hwarang warriors under the Koryo dynasty (918-1392) did wear tattoos as marks of bravery and loyalty. But tattoos were also used as a form of criminal punishment from 935 CE onward, thus have long been associated with social outcasts. At some point in Korean history, tattoos were also used as markers of ownership. Moreover, during the Japanese occupation, Korean gangs adopted the manners of the yakuza and started using tattoos as markers of gang identification. Adding to these stigma, Confucianism supports the principle of preserving the body as it was at birth and sees tattoos as mutilations, so these are culturally frowned upon for this reason as well. So much so that until 2021, men with tattoos were excluded from active military duty. Some businesses such as the Hurshimchung Spa in Busan still refused entry to some people wearing tattoos in 2023, although in that particular case this policy does not seem to be systematically applied anymore. But on television, tattoos are still covered with either clothes or bandages. The Constitutional Court's 2022 decision to keep tattoing illegal for non-doctors may not be the last word on that point: in 2021, a poll determined that 81% of Koreans in their 20s, and 60% of Koreans in their 30s and 40s, agree with lifting tattoo restrictions; and that the younger the respondent, the less they felt tattoos needed to be concealed on television as well. "K-tattoos" are thriving and the government may well come to endorse tattoos if it contributes to the promotion of all things Korean in the wake of the huge world success of k-pop.) and that older Koreans still find difficult to accept. In 1992 the Supreme Court had ruled that tattooing was a medical service — and as such was to be practiced only by certified doctors; South Korea's Medical Act allows for unlicenced tattooists to be criminally fined up to 50 million won — $41,300 — or even imprisoned up to a life sentence. Around June 10, 2021, Ryu Ho-jeong submitted a proposition for a bill to create a professional licence for tattooists, and posed for photos in Seoul's National Assembly complex, showing erasable tattoos on her back. On March 31, 2022, in a 5-4 split vote, the Constitutional Court upheld the constitutionality of the Medical Act and the interpretation of tattooing as a medical practice.

On 28 November 2023, Ryu announced that she has informally left the Justice Party. Ryu said she is only maintaining Party membership to keep her seat as a proportional representative. In Korean election law, if a member of Parliament elected through proportional representation leaves the party, they also lose their seat as an elected lawmaker. Ryu rejected the Party's plan to create an electoral alliance of left-wing parties agreed by the Justice Party and the Green Party. Ryu and fellow Justice Party member of parliament Jang Hye-young have expressed interest in creating an alliance called the Third Power. The two Justice Party lawmakers have stated that "progressive politics alone have failed" and aim to bring together all political factions that are opposed to the Democratic Party and the People Power Party. This includes Yang Hyang-ja's centrist science politics party, Hope of Korea, and Keum Tae-seop's also centrist liberal party, New Choice.

On the morning of 30 November 2023, Jang Hye-young announced her departure from Third Power and return to the Justice Party. The reason given for her departure are unclear, but it comes after right-wing politicians in Third Power used sexist language to criticize a strike that was ongoing of female game developers due to gender-based discrimination in video game development.

On 17 December 2023, Ryu attended on the founding convention of New Choice Party with some members of Third Power. She has kept a distance from the Justice Party after late 2023 and announced to become a part of Keum's new party. However by South Korean electoral law, proportional representative MPs can't hold their own seat in parliament if they withdraw from their original party. Thus Ryu declared that she will act as a member of New Choice Party without official withdrawal from Justice Party, she was criticized by remaining members of Justice Party.

On 15 January 2024, Ryu announced her departure from the Justice Party. In doing so, and in accordance to election law, Ryu also forfeit her role as a proportional representative Member of Parliament for the Justice Party. She then joined New Choice to prepare for the upcoming 2024 parliamentary election. Following the merger of the New Choice Party with the New Reform Party, Ryu initially declared her candidacy for the New Reform Party in Seongnam Bundang A. However on March 22, she announced that she would be withdrawing from the race.

On 17 February 2025, Ryu gave her first interview in almost a year. She stated that she had left the New Reform Party and quit politics altogether, now working as a carpenter at a custom furniture manufacturing and interior design company in Namyangju, Gyeonggi Province.

She later became the CEO of Lucywood.

== Political positions ==
Ryu was a member of the Justice Party. She has said that she wishes to create the "first progressive opposition party with a clear voice for the socially disadvantaged." She holds progressive positions on various issues such as LGBT rights, homelessness, workers' rights, and women's rights. She supports the legalisation and destigmatisation of tattooing.

In her 17 February 2025 interview, Ryu stated that she had not had time to engage in activism since starting her new job as a carpenter. However, she affirmed her identity as a feminist, saying that feminism should go beyond stereotypes and embrace diversity, while she does not plan to return to formal political office for now. She expressed a desire to continue political engagement as a citizen through social media.
