= Reform Party (South Korea) =

Reform Party 개혁신당
- Abbreviation: RP
- Leader: Lee Ki-in (ERC)
- Secretary-General: Kim Chul-keun
- Floor Leader: Chun Ha-ram
- Founder: Lee Jun-seok
- Founded: 20 January 2024
- Merger of: Hope of Korea (Note: Agreed to merge on 24 January 2024 and finished 6 February 2024); New Choice (Note: Agreed to merge on 9 February 2024 and finalised 23 April 2024); Principles and Common Sense (Note: Agreed to merge on 9 February 2024 and finalised 15 February 2024)
- Split from: People Power Party
- Membership (May 2025): 106,183
- Ideology: Conservatism (South Korean); Libertarian conservatism
- Political position: Centre-right to right-wing
- Colours: Orange; Black
- Slogan: "Nemo iudex in causa sua"
- National Assembly: 3 / 300
- Metropolitan Mayors and Governors: 0 / 16
- Municipal Mayors: 0 / 227
- Provincial and Metropolitan Councillors: 0 / 933
- Municipal Councillors: 1 / 3,034

Party flag

Website
- reformparty.kr

Korean name
- Hangul: 개혁신당
- Hanja: 改革新黨
- RR: Gaehyeok sindang
- MR: Kaehyŏk sindang

The Reform Party (RP; Korean: 개혁신당; lit. 'Reform New Party') is a South Korean political party. Founded by Lee Jun-seok, the former leader of the People Power Party (PPP), as a conservative party after his split from the PPP, it has subsequently merged with various parties and factions led by politicians formerly affiliated with the Democratic Party of Korea (DPK) and Justice Party, though the party is still regarded as politically conservative and on the right of the political spectrum.

== History ==
The founding congress of the Reform Party was held on 20 January 2024. At the founding congress, the intention was emphasized to create a "third force", which would include the Reform Party, to oppose the Democratic Party and the PPP. The new party expressed its readiness to create coalitions. The party is led by former People Power Party leader Lee Jun-seok and the conservative Kim Yong-nam is the party's policy committee chief.

On 24 January 2024, Yang Hyang-ja's Hope of Korea merged into the Reform Party ahead of the April 10 parliamentary election. On February 9, it was announced that the party, along with Future Party led by Lee Nak-yon, would merge to create the Reform Party, with the new party being led by Lee Jun-seok and Lee Nak-yon.

On 20 February 2024, Lee Nak-yon and his New Future Party announced their withdrawal from the merger with the Reform Party. Kim Jong-min, an assemblyman close to Lee, also left the party to rejoin Lee's New Future Party.

In April 2025, the party rejected Hong Joon-pyo's suggestion for a merger with the People Power Party, citing its opposition to the PPP's support for Yoon Suk-yeol after the 2024 martial law crisis.

== Ideology ==
Initially, the Reform Party mainly consisted of moderate conservatives centred around Lee Jun-seok, joined by centrists formerly affiliated with the Bareunmirae Party. Members of the Justice Party who refused an election alliance with the Green Party also left the party and joined the election alliance, including former MP Ryu Ho-jeong. However, after consecutive mergers with other parties and factions, it has morphed into a politically conservative party on the right of the political spectrum. The party is putting forward reformist politics.

Because its various factions were merged to form a centrist block ahead of the 2024 South Korean parliamentary elections, party members remain divided along ideological lines.

The party claims to be against authoritarianism and statism and seeks to protect liberty.

== Election results ==
=== President ===
Election	Candidate	Votes	%	Result
2025	Lee Jun-seok	2,917,523	8.34	Lost

=== Legislature ===
Election	Leader	Constituency				Party list				Seats		Position	Status
Election	Leader	Votes	%	Seats	+/-	Votes	%	Seats	+/-	No.	+/–	Position	Status
2024	Lee Jun-seok	195,147	0.68	New	1 / 254	1,025,775	3.62	New	2 / 46	3 / 300	New	4th	Opposition
