= Lee Jun-seok =

South Korean politician (born 1985)

Lee Jun-seok MP
- 이준석
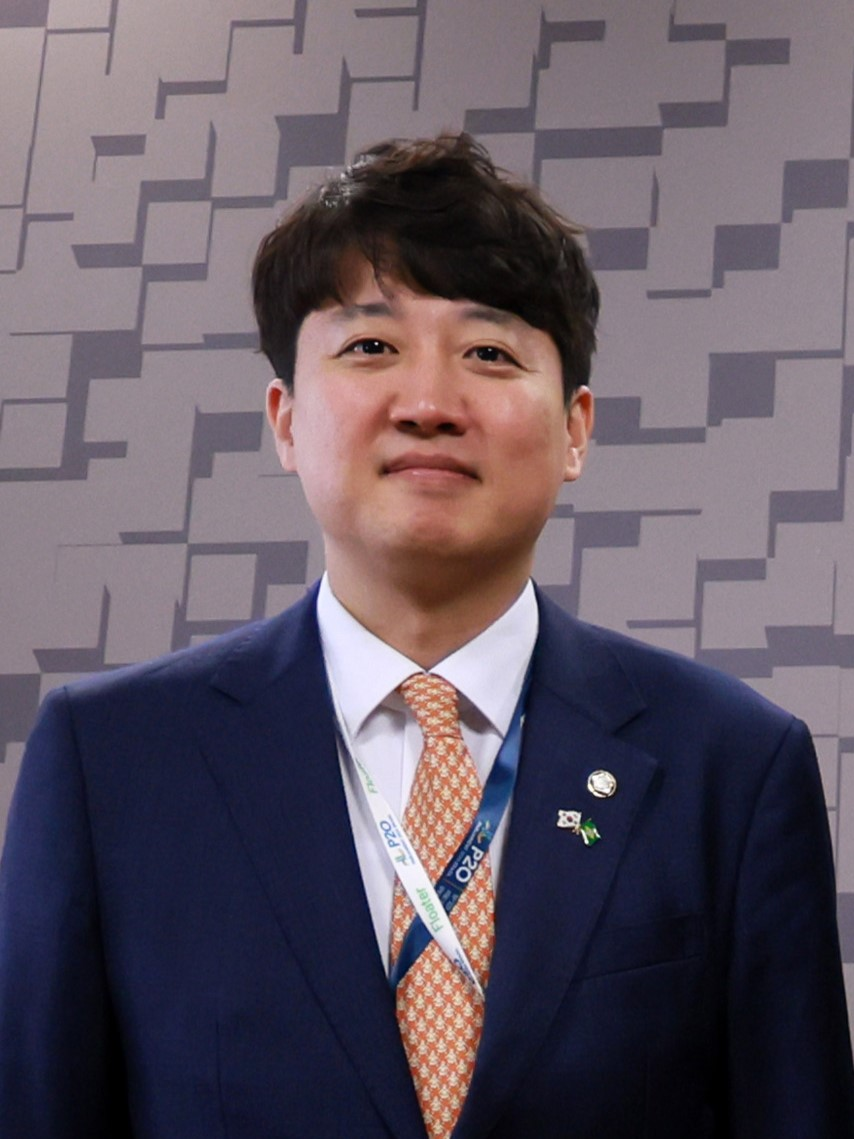
- Lee in 2024

Leader of the Reform Party
- In office 27 July 2025 – 26 August 2026
- Preceded by: Chun Ha-ram (acting)
- Succeeded by: Chun Ha-ram (acting)
- In office 20 January 2024 – 19 May 2024
- Preceded by: Office established
- Succeeded by: Her Eun-a

Leader of the People Power Party
- In office 11 June 2021 – 9 August 2022
- Preceded by: Hwang Kyo-ahn; Kim Gi-hyeon (interim)
- Succeeded by: Kweon Seong-dong (interim)

Member of the National Assembly
- Incumbent
- Assumed office 30 May 2024
- Preceded by: Lee Won-wook
- Constituency: Hwaseong B (Gyeonggi)

Personal details
- Born: 31 March 1985 (age 41) Seongdong District, Seoul, South Korea
- Party: Reform (since 2024)
- Other political affiliations: GNP (2011–2012); Saenuri (2012–2016); Independent (2016–2017, 2020); Bareun (2017–2018); Bareunmirae (2018–2020); New Conservative (2020); People Power (2020–2023); Independent (2023–2024)
- Education: Harvard University (BA) (BCS)
- Nickname: Andy Lee

Korean name
- Hangul: 이준석
- Hanja: 李俊錫
- RR: I Junseok
- MR: I Chunsŏk

Lee Jun-seok (Korean: 이준석; born 31 March 1985) is a South Korean politician who served as the leader of the Reform Party 2025 to 2026 and as the member of the National Assembly for Hwaseong B since 2024. The founder of the Reform Party, he was the party's nominee in the 2025 presidential election and had previously served as its leader from January to May 2024.

Born in Seoul, Lee graduated from Harvard University in 2007. He entered politics as a young member of the Park Geun-hye presidential administration, during which he served as one of the 11-member Grand National Party's (later renamed Saenuri Party) Executive Leadership Council, the youngest member ever to sit on the Council. After the impeachment of Park in 2016, he left the Saenuri Party and joined the centre-right conservative minor Bareun Party, of which he served as one of the party's Supreme Council members. The Bareun Party merged into the Bareunmirae Party, and Lee's faction of that party later merged with the majority right-wing conservative Party to form the current People Power Party (PPP).

In June 2021, the PPP voted Lee as its leader, making him the youngest person in South Korean history to lead the main conservative bloc. As leader of the PPP, Lee led his party to victory in the 2022 presidential election and the 2022 local elections. He has been noted for his staunch antifeminism and support from South Korean idaenam (young men).

On 8 July 2022, Lee was given a six-month suspension from the PPP as the result of a bribery and prostitution scandal. Lee was officially removed from party leadership on 9 August. On 20 September, Police decided not to refer Lee to prosecution over sexual bribery charges. On 7 October, Lee's party suspension was extended by a year by the party's ethics committee. On 13 October, police decided not to refer Lee to prosecution over evidence destruction. His suspension from the PPP was removed on 2 November 2023, together with three other politicians' suspensions. Since then, he has left the PPP to establish a new party, the Reform Party. In the 2025 presidential election, Lee was the party's nominee and placed third in the general election.

== Early life and education ==
Lee Jun-seok was born on 31 March 1985 at Hanyang University Hospital in Seongdong District, Seoul. His father, Lee Su-wol, was the previous head of the global institutional sales team at Shinhan Bank, while mother, Kim Hyang-ja, was a teacher at Andong Girls' High School. During his adolescent years, he lived in a semi-basement house in Sanggye-dong, an impoverished neighbourhood where the housing price was the cheapest. A few years later, his family eventually moved to a middle-class district Hanshin Village in Sanggye-dong and lived there for ten years. After his father was assigned overseas, he stayed in Singapore and Indonesia for one year.

When he returned to Korea, he settled in Mok-dong and graduated from Wolchon Middle School. After graduating from middle school, he mainly lived in a dormitory due to academic reasons. He returned to Sanggye-dong after 20 years. During his time at Seoul Science High School, Lee served as the vice president of the student council. In March 2003, he was accepted at KAIST as a Mathematics major but withdrew admission right after receiving his Harvard acceptance letter and full-ride presidential science scholarship.

After graduating from Harvard University in 2007, Lee returned to Korea to perform military duties working as a software developer (alternative military service as industrial technical personnel) at 'Innotive', an image browsing software startup, a subsidiary of Nexon. While on duty, Lee established a non-profit organization called Edushare 'Society of Sharing Education' and became its acting representative.

After completing his national service, Lee prepared to start his own venture. He received funding from the venture startup program backed by the Ministry of SMEs and Startups on 5 August 2011 and founded Classe Studio: an ed-tech startup that developed personalized tutoring software and workplace training applications.

== Political career ==
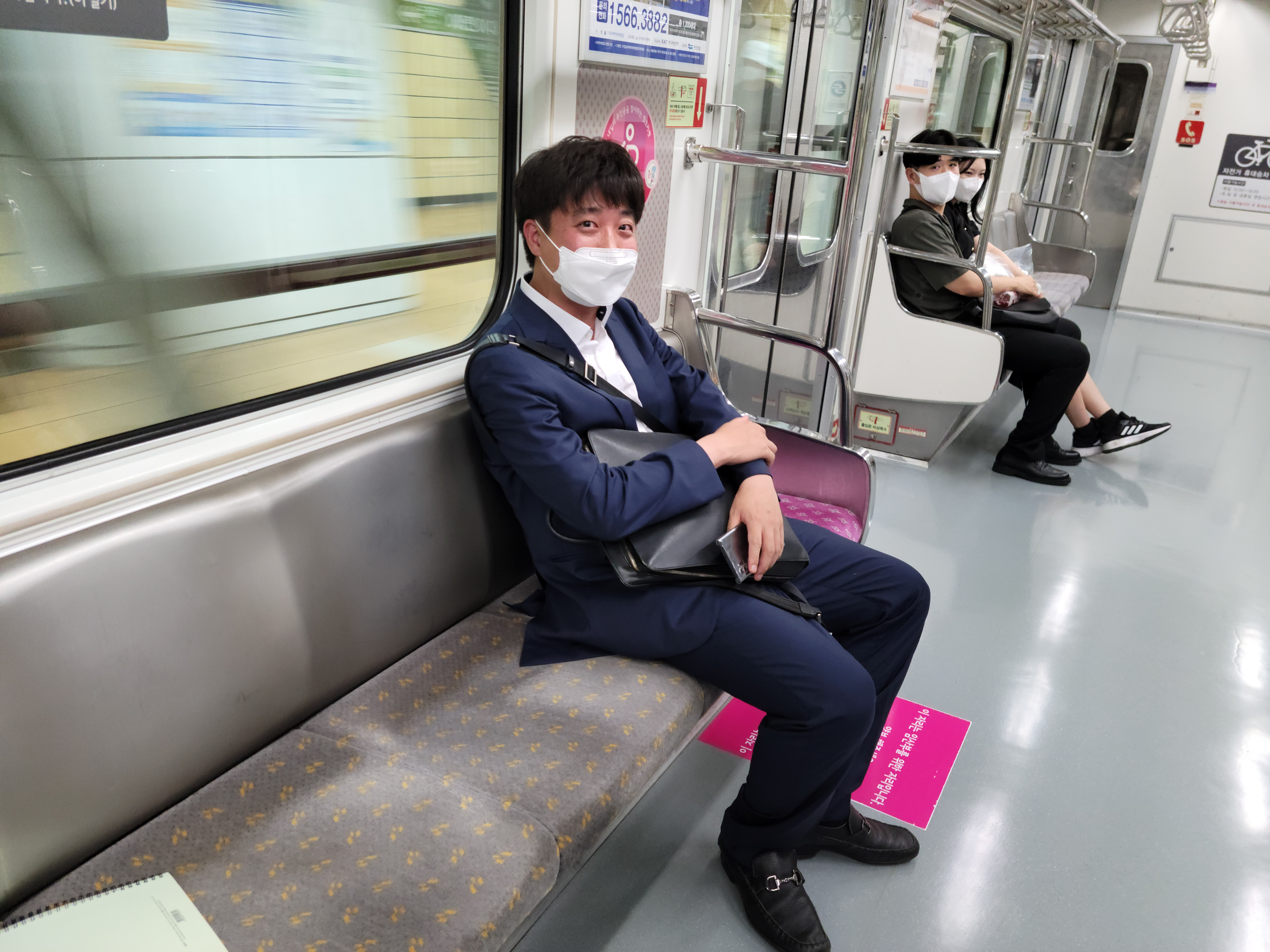
Lee in 2021

Lee had an interview with Park Geun-hye, the head of Grand National Party's emergency response committee, who visited 'Edushare' in November 2011 for 2 hours. He was introduced as a venture entrepreneur in his 20s who graduated from Harvard University on 29 December. Then, Lee was recruited to the emergency response committee of the Grand National Party.

After being appointed to the committee, Lee attracted attention with his eloquence in debate. He increased his public recognition by appearing on various TV Shows. Then, Lee ran for the National Assembly election in 2016 in Sanggye-dong against Ahn Cheol-soo (the running candidate for Presidential primary) but lost.

Lee was nicknamed as 'Park Geun-hye Kid' but supported Park's impeachment in October 2016. Lee left with Saenuri Party and established a new political party, named the Bareun Party with Yoo Seong-min. In 2018, Lee unsuccessfully ran for the National Assembly election. Before the 21st election of members of the National Assembly, Lee was appointed as a youth supreme representative in United Future Party.

After seeing a taxi driver setting fire to himself in the National Assembly, Lee acquired a taxi driver's license and worked as a taxi driver for 12 hours daily for two months in March and April 2019. Even though Lee never won an election, he lived as a political commentator, media host for 10 years, appearing on both entertainment and political TV Shows.

In the 2021 by-elections, Lee played a role in the Seoul mayoral by-election as the head of the new media division for Oh Se-hoon's campaign and played a leading role in mobilizing young voters by launching the "2030 Citizen Campaign Group," which replaced traditional political speeches with youth-led street rallies and public participation.

=== Leader of the People Power Party (2021–2022) ===
In 2021, Lee ran for the election to select the leader of the People Power Party. He became popular with people in their 20s and 30s due to his opposing stance against political correctness such as "faux feminism," introducing reforms supporting meritocracy rather than outright equality of outcome. Rather than relying on traditional campaign methods, Lee emphasized direct engagement with the public, eschewing a formal campaign office and instead travelling by subway with a minimal team to convey transparency and relatability. Lee lost the partial election to Na Kyung-won, but won the main election, recording 43.82 percent (93,390 votes) including votes from the Public Opinion Poll. As a result, Lee was elected as the leader of the PPP, the youngest to represent the main conservative bloc in Korean political history. Lee has a negative stance on affirmative action. He is rated as having idaenam as his main support.

Under Lee's leadership, the PPP won the 2022 presidential election, with Yoon Suk Yeol narrowly defeating Lee Jae-myung of the Democratic Party with 48.56% of the vote. In the local elections held in June of the same year, the PPP secured 12 out of 17 mayoral and gubernatorial posts nationwide.

==== Conflicts with Yoon Suk Yeol ====
On 29 November 2021, Lee posted a Facebook post saying, "If that is the case, this is it," with another post showing a text emoji of a smiling face and a thumbs-down gesture and has refused to answer on the phone and has been avoiding the press until December 3. The move was considered to be a protest against Yoon Suk Yeol ignoring him as leader of the party. The feud was resolved by their meeting in Ulsan on 3 December.

=== Ethics investigation, suspension, and ouster (2022–2023) ===
In December 2021, far-right think tank Hover Lab alleged that Lee had received sexual favours as bribes in 2013. Lee denied the allegations and announced that he would pursue legal action against Hover Lab. While the PPP had initially declined to commence a disciplinary process against Lee, it reversed its decision after Hover Lab released an audio recording that they alleged confirmed that such sexual favours had taken place.

On 22 April 2022, the PPP opened an ethics violation complaint against Lee. Lee is the first chairman in the history of the country's main conservative party to be referred to the ethics committee for review while still in office.

On 8 July 2022, the PPP's ethics commission sentenced Lee to a six-month suspension of party activities and from his role as party leader until 8 January 2023. The subject of the committee's deliberation was the alleged attempts of Lee and Kim Cheol-keun, the head of the party's political affairs office, to destroy evidence. Kim Cheol-keun was handed a two-year suspension from party activities for destroying evidence of Lee's acceptance of sexual favours and bribery.

On 9 August 2022, Lee was automatically removed from party leadership. Joo Ho-young took over as interim party leader on the following day.

On 26 August 2022, a court decided that Lee's suspended from duty was against the party constitution. On 8 September, the PPP central committee amended the party constitution, and Chung Jin-Seok took over as the new interim party leader instead. On 20 September, police decided not to refer Lee to prosecution over sexual bribery charges. However, it did announce that Lee would be investigated over whether he made false accusations against Hover Lab. This scandal has had a major impact on Lee's political career.

On 7 October 2022, Lee's suspension was extended by another year by the PPP's ethics committee.

On 2 November 2023, Lee's suspension was removed, along with other politicians such as Hong Joon-pyo.

On 27 December 2023, Lee officially declared his departure from the People Power Party and announced the formation of a new political party, stating that he would begin walking his own "NeXTSTEP," a phrase he used to describe his vision.

=== Reform Party (2024–present) ===
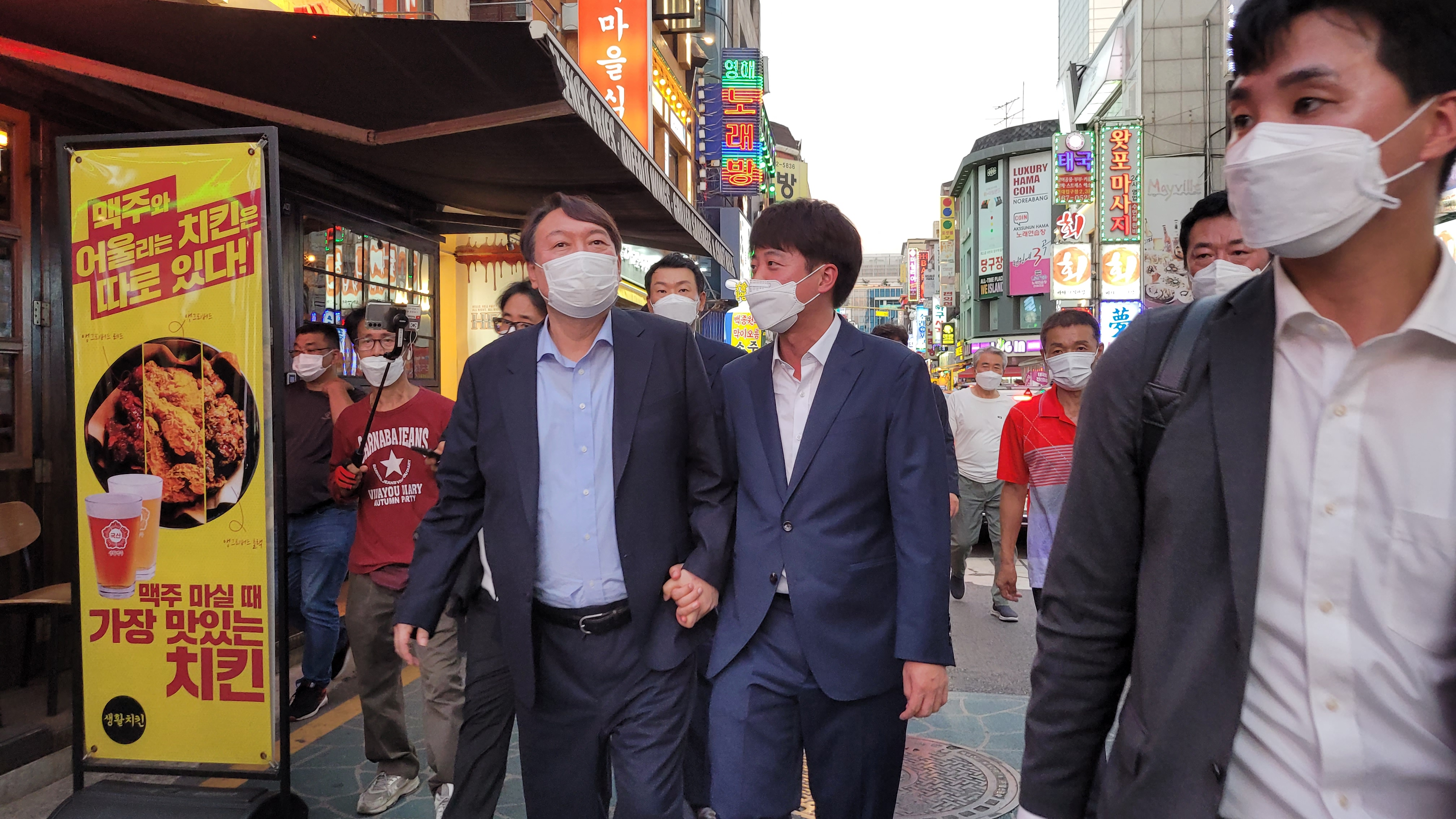
Lee (right) with the former Prosecutor General Yoon Suk Yeol in 2021

On 20 January 2024, Lee founded the Reform Party.

On 10 April 2024, he was elected as a member of the National Assembly for the first time. His victory was unexpected, as Lee moved to his new constituency only weeks before the election. Lee was the only candidate to win a constituency seat as a third-party candidate, defeating both major parties, the PPP and the Democratic Party.

On 4 December 2024, amid President Yoon Suk Yeol's declaration of martial law, Lee publicly clashed with police forces that physically barred his entry to the National Assembly.

On 18 March 2025, the party announced that Lee would be its candidate for a potential presidential election to be held in the event that the impeachment of Yoon Suk Yeol was upheld. On 11 April 2025, a week after the termination of Yoon's presidency, Lee began his campaign for the 2025 presidential election.

On 27 May 2025, during a televised presidential debate, Lee asked opponent Kwon Yeong-guk "If someone were to talk about wanting to stick chopsticks in a woman's genitals, would that be considered misogynistic?" (Note: "만약에 어떤 사람이 여성에 대해 얘기할 때 여성의 어떤 성기나 이런 곳에 젓가락을 꽂고 싶다고 얘기했다면 여성 혐오에 해당하냐 아니냐.") Kwon refused to respond. The question referenced a past case in which Lee Jae-myung's son was convicted and fined for posting obscene content online, including expressions similar to the one mentioned in the debate. The remark, which was broadcast live, drew criticism from certain civic groups and politicians for its explicit content, particularly given the family-viewing context of the debate, while others argued that the controversy stemmed from past remarks by Lee Jae-myung's son, and that Lee Jun-seok was raising the issue to highlight alleged double standards. Lee later apologized for the graphic language but defended his intent, saying he sought to highlight what he viewed as the Democratic Party's double standards of "remaining silent about misconduct within its ranks while labeling him as misogynistic" and characterized the criticisms against him as ad hominem.

On 30 May 2025, a group of 21 lawmakers from the Democratic Party, Rebuilding Korea Party, Progressive Party, Basic Income Party, and Social Democratic Party submitted a disciplinary motion against Lee, arguing that his televised remarks constituted sexual harassment and violated election and ethics regulations by publicly demeaning a specific gender.

During the election on 3 June, Lee placed third, garnering 8.34% of the vote. He conceded following the release of exit polls, stating: "If the current result stands, Lee Jae-myung will take office. Given the immense challenges of national unity and economic recovery, I hope he makes thoughtful and appropriate decisions." He was unanimously reelected as leader of the Reform Party in a convention on 27 July.

== Political positions ==
Lee has most often been described as a conservative or centre-right politician. While some critics have described Lee as far-right in the context of generation conflicts and a minority of political opponents have characterized him as left-wing, Lee describes his stance as a "conservative-leaning liberal". His political rise, sometimes referred to as the "Lee Jun-seok phenomenon," has been attributed to his meritocracy and antifeminism rhetoric, which has drawn support from a segment of younger voters, particularly the idaenam, men in their 20s.

=== Gender inequality ===
Lee has expressed criticism of certain feminist movements in South Korea, describing them as having totalitarian tendencies. Lee said feminism, when used by politicians to provoke conflict, becomes like 'blowfish poison' and criticized that hiring targets for women as reverse discrimination, while gender inequality in South Korea is still recognized to persist including high gender wage gaps and disparities in professional advancement. Lee gained strong support from young male voters through antifeminist rhetoric, particularly during the 2022 presidential election and the 2022 local elections, attributing their support to frustration with feminism and what he described as the Democratic Party of Korea's "pro-women agenda."

Lee has questioned the narrative that women in South Korea face systemic discrimination, arguing that some gender-based concerns are rooted in what he described as "unfounded victim mentality." These remarks were later classified as hate speech by the National Human Rights Commission of Korea. Lee responded by accusing the commission of "carelessly labeling speech as hate" and attempting to create "untouchable sacred zones."

Lee was an early proponent of the finger pinching conspiracy theory, a claim alleging hidden radical feminist messaging in advertisements. He quoted that an explanation was required after a poster promoting camping was sold by GS25, which has been accused for the intentional reference to the logo of Megalia.

Lee's rhetoric has widely been described as antifeminism, particularly in relation to younger male voters in 20s to 40s, although he has argued that it's not about anti-feminism, but about fair competition. Lee is regarded as a leading role in politicizing gender divisions in South Korea during these elections, particularly by overtly amplifying anti-feminist sentiment and positioning gender backlash as a core campaign issue, and it is argued that support for Lee is, in part, rooted in misogyny, as he amplified voices within the anti-feminist movement and validated their concerns.

Lee has been alleged to engage in divisive political tactics, particularly by focusing on issues that generate media attention and resonate with specific voter demographics. Critics, including political scientists and members of opposing parties, have argued that Lee's rhetoric disproportionately targets older generations and feminist movements, and is aimed at consolidating support among younger male demographics at the expense of broader coalition-building. In response to such criticisms, Lee has maintained that his policy proposals reflect legitimate reform efforts and should not be dismissed as divisive or hate-driven. He has stated that "new perspectives may be uncomfortable to some, but they are necessary for real change."

=== Meritocracy ===
Lee has advocated for what he describes as meritocracy or performance-based system. Lee has been critical of affirmative action policies, such as gender, regional, and age quotas in political candidate nominations, contending that they may inadvertently perpetuate discrimination by emphasizing group identities over individual capabilities. As an alternative, he introduced the People Power Aptitude Test (PPAT), a standardized exam intended to assess the basic competencies required of political candidates and reduce the influence of subjective selection by local party chapter heads.

Supporters and some commentators describe Lee's appeal as reflective of a generational desire for "fair competition" based on individual capability. Lee's perspective gained momentum amid public frustration over "fairness" controversies under the Moon Jae-in administration, including Cho Kuk scandal and the backlash over the Incheon International Airport part-time to full-time transition controversy. Lee's advocacy of merit-based processes such as exam scores, credentials, and measurable qualifications has been viewed by supporters as aligning with younger voters' expectations of fair competition. Some political analysts have interpreted Lee's meritocratic framing as a step toward liberalism from what they describe as "tribalism" in Korean politics. Other perspectives have raised concerns that Lee's meritocracy may overlook structural inequalities. Critics argue that factors such as socioeconomic status, regional disparities, and gender can affect individuals' access to opportunities, and that a purely merit-based framework may not account for these differences. These debates have contributed to what some media outlets have referred to as the "Lee Jun-seok phenomenon."

Lee's book Fair Competition includes statements where he compares society to a jungle in which the strong naturally win, expressing admiration for the U.S. system's relative tolerance for inequality in pursuit of liberty and efficiency.

In response to critiques that his meritocratic agenda overlooks fair opportunity, Lee has emphasized the enhancement of public education as a complement. During his tenure at Edushare, he argued that lack of access to quality education due to poverty makes a society "hopeless." He has proposed targeted state interventions in public education similar to No Child Left Behind Act or Every Student Succeeds Act raise baseline achievement levels. He argues that claiming stigma effect of such education system as policies to keep the people ignorant.

=== Social issues ===
As part of the Reform Party platform, Lee proposed that starting in 2030, mandatory military service be included as a qualification requirement for both men and women in certain public sector roles.

Lee has expressed support for protecting individuals from discrimination based on personal characteristics such as sexual orientation, stating that there should be no discrimination against personal traits like gender identity. However, he opposed the immediate passage of the anti-discrimination law, describing it as "premature" and citing lack of public and party-wide consensus. This approach has drawn criticism from political opponents, who argue that Lee offers reformist rhetoric without showing willingness to act on major policy issues. Some critics interpret his position as effectively opposing the bill.

=== Climate policy ===
Lee has expressed support to increasing reliability on nuclear power, due to concerns such as oil price. He treats nuclear energy sources as affordable, safe, and clean. While supportive of renewable energy, Lee has pointed out contradictions in relying on liquefied natural gas (LNG) as a backup for solar and wind, citing its higher carbon emissions. He advocated for a more energy mix that considers carbon output and energy reliability.

Lee has emphasized feasibility and public acceptance of climate policies. He has expressed scepticism toward the disposable cup deposit system, arguing that implementation should not place undue burdens on small businesses. He has also advocated for incentive-based approaches to electric vehicle adoption, emphasizing that environmental policies should focus on tangible benefits rather than shifting costs onto the public.

=== Transit policy ===
Lee has proposed replacing South Korea's free subway fare system for seniors aged 65+ with a universal ₩10,000 monthly transportation voucher usable on subways, buses, and taxis, followed by a 40% discount. Lee argues that the current exemption system is no longer financially sustainable due to South Korea's aging population and rising public transit deficits and emphasizes the regional inequality of the current system, pointing out that seniors in rural areas without subways receive no comparable benefits. He argued that the new policy is more equitable and efficient, ensuring that benefits reach all seniors, including those outside major cities. The chairman of Korean Senior Citizens Association has criticized Lee's proposal. He argued that fare exemptions, 815.9 billion wons a year, are not a significant cause of transit deficits and raised concerns that the proposed transit card would limit mobility and negatively affect seniors' health, resulting in greater financial burden.

=== Foreign policy ===
Lee advocates a hardline stance on North Korea, supporting unification through regime absorption rather than compromise. He also opposes unconditional aid to the North, stating it should only be provided if its South Korean origin is acknowledged and distribution is transparent. In 2025 election, he has pledged to suggest an unconditional meeting with Kim Jong Un if elected.

He stated that the South Korea–United States alliance is the core of Korean diplomacy and described the U.S.–Japan–South Korea trilateral pact as necessary. However, Lee has expressed opposition to tariffs in the second Trump administration. He also proposed a partnership with Japan in aerospace research and shared infrastructure.

Lee has publicly supported democratic movements in the 2019–2020 Hong Kong protests, voicing criticism of the Chinese government's actions. Following the Russian invasion of Ukraine, Lee has visited Ukraine and expressed support for international pro-democracy and humanitarian efforts.

=== Government restructuring ===
Lee has supported restructuring the government into a small government. In the presidential election in 2022, he supported abolishing the Ministry of Gender Equality and Family, proposing that its functions be transferred to the Ministry of Employment and Labor, while suggesting the Ministry of Unification be integrated into the Ministry of Foreign Affairs. He argued these ministries are either "past their expiration date" or "never had a meaningful role to begin with."

In 2025, he named "building a government that works well by reducing presidential power" as his first campaign pledge, stating that he would create a small, function-centered government that prioritizes administrative expertise over formal structure by reducing the number of ministries from 19 to 13 and introducing three deputy prime ministers overseeing national security, strategic affairs, and social affairs. He reaffirmed plans to abolish the Ministry of Gender Equality and Family, transferring its functions to the Ministry of Health and Welfare and the National Human Rights Commission of Korea, and to merge the Ministry of Unification into a restructured Ministry of Foreign Affairs and Unification. Other proposed changes include renaming the Ministry of Economy and Finance and transferring its budgeting authority to the Prime Minister's Office, as well as simplifying ministry names, including renaming the Ministry of the Interior and Safety to Ministry of Home Affairs. Several ministries would be consolidated: Ministry of Land, Infrastructure and Transport, Ministry of Oceans and Fisheries, and Ministry of Environment into a Ministry of Construction and Transportation; Ministry of Trade, Industry and Energy and Ministry of SMEs and Startups into a Ministry of Industrial and Energy Affairs; and Education and Ministry of Science and ICT into a Ministry of Education and Science. The Ministry of Health and Welfare would be split into separate ministries for health and welfare. Lee also proposed abolishing the Office of National Security and the Corruption Investigation Office for High-ranking Officials.

=== Impeachments of South Korean presidents ===
Lee has stated that the impeachment of Park Geun-hye was justified. Regarding the "economic community" theory cited during her trial, he noted that it was unusual for a president to face direct criminal liability, but said he respected the court's judgment.

Following Yoon Suk Yeol's 2024 South Korean martial law crisis, Lee condemned the move as unconstitutional and likened it to an attempted insurrection, stating that it constituted grounds for impeachment and that those who aided it could be guilty of rebellion.

=== Comparisons to US politicians ===
Na Kyung-won, a former politician leader in the PPP, described Lee's politics as "Trumpism". South Korean liberal newspaper The Hankyoreh also compared Lee Jun-seok to Donald Trump. It wrote that there may be many differences in the political positions of the two, but the background of their dissatisfaction with the established system is similar. Lee stated that he fashions himself more after Barack Obama in terms of policy. He has also cited Elon Musk as an inspiration, particularly for his approach to cutting inefficiencies in the public sector, referencing Department of Government Efficiency.

== Authored books ==
- Lee Jun-seok (11 April 2012). 어린 놈이 정치를? : 이준석이 말하는 issue 25 (in Korean). Seoul: jcontentree M&B. ISBN 978-89-6456-168-3.
- Lee Jun-seok; Sohn Ah-ram (5 March 2018). 그 의견에는 동의합니다 : 보수와 진보의 새로운 아이콘, 좌우의 간극과 그 접점을 이야기하다 (in Korean). Paju: book21. ISBN 978-89-509-7394-0.
- Lee Jun-seok (28 June 2019). 공정한 경쟁 : 대한민국 보수의 가치와 미래를 묻다 (in Korean). Seoul: 나무옆의자. ISBN 979-11-6157-061-7.
- Lee Jun-seok (7 March 2023). 이준석의 거부할 수 없는 미래 (in Korean). Seoul: 21세기북스. ISBN 978-89-5095-379-9.

== Election results ==
=== Legislative elections ===
2016 South Korean legislative election – Nowon C, Seoul
Party	Candidate	Votes	%
Saenuri	Lee Jun-seok	32,285	31.32
Democratic	Hwang Chang-hwa	14,370	13.94
People	Ahn Cheol-soo	53,930	52.33
Justice	Joo Hee-jun	1,911	1.85
Republic of Korea Party	Na Gi-hwan	264	0.25
People's United	Joo Hee-jun	294	0.28
Total votes		103,710	100.00
People hold			

2018 South Korean by-elections – Nowon C, Seoul
Party	Candidate	Votes	%
Democratic	Kim Sung-whan	51,817	56.43
Liberty Korea	Kang Yeon-jae	13,297	14.48
Bareunmirae	Lee Jun-seok	25,001	27.23
Democracy and Peace	Kim Yoon-ho	622	0.67
Independent	Choi Chang-woo	1,075	1.17
Total votes		93,904	100.00
Democratic gain from Bareunmirae			

2020 South Korean legislative election – Nowon C, Seoul
Party	Candidate	Votes	%
Democratic	Kim Sung-whan	55,556	53.15
United Future	Lee Jun-seok	46,373	44.36
Justice	Lee Nam-su	1,645	1.57
Minjung	Kim Sun-kyung	551	0.52
National Revolutionary	Kim Kwang-chul	1,075	1.17
Total votes		105,415	100.00
Democratic hold			

2024 South Korean legislative election – Hwaseong B, Gyeonggi
Party	Candidate	Votes	%
Democratic	Gong Young-woon	48,578	39.73
People Power	Han Jung-min	21,826	17.85
Reform	Lee Jun-seok	51,856	42.41
Total votes		122,944	100.00
Reform gain from Democratic			

=== Presidential elections ===
2025 South Korean presidential election
Party	Candidate	Votes	%
Democratic	Lee Jae Myung	17,287,513	49.42
People Power	Kim Moon-soo	14,395,639	41.15
Reform	Lee Jun-seok	2,917,523	8.34
Justice	Kwon Yeong-guk	344,150	0.98
Independent	Song Jin-ho	35,791	0.10
Total votes		35,236,497	100.00
Democratic gain from People Power			

== Filmography ==
=== Television shows ===
Year	Title	Role	Ref.
2013	The Genius: Rules of the Game	Participant	
2015	The Genius: Grand Final	Participant	
