= 2030 South Korean presidential election =

- 27 March 2030
Party	Democratic	People Power
Incumbent President
Lee Jae Myung
Democratic

Presidential elections are scheduled to be held in South Korea on 27 March 2030. They will be the tenth presidential elections since democratization and the establishment of the Sixth Republic. Under the South Korean constitution, incumbent president Lee Jae Myung is ineligible for reelection.

== Electoral system ==
The President of South Korea is elected by first-past-the-post voting for a five-year term. Presidents are limited to a single term of office.

== Potential candidates ==
=== Democratic Party ===
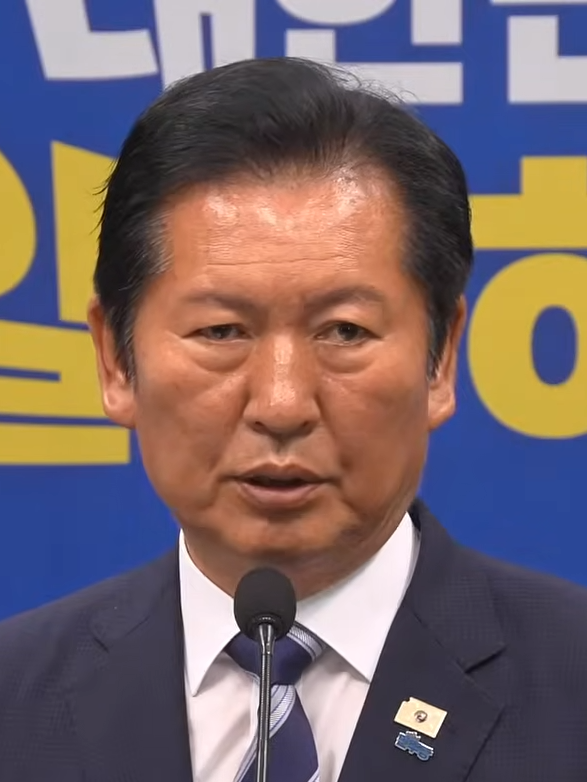
Jung Chung-rae

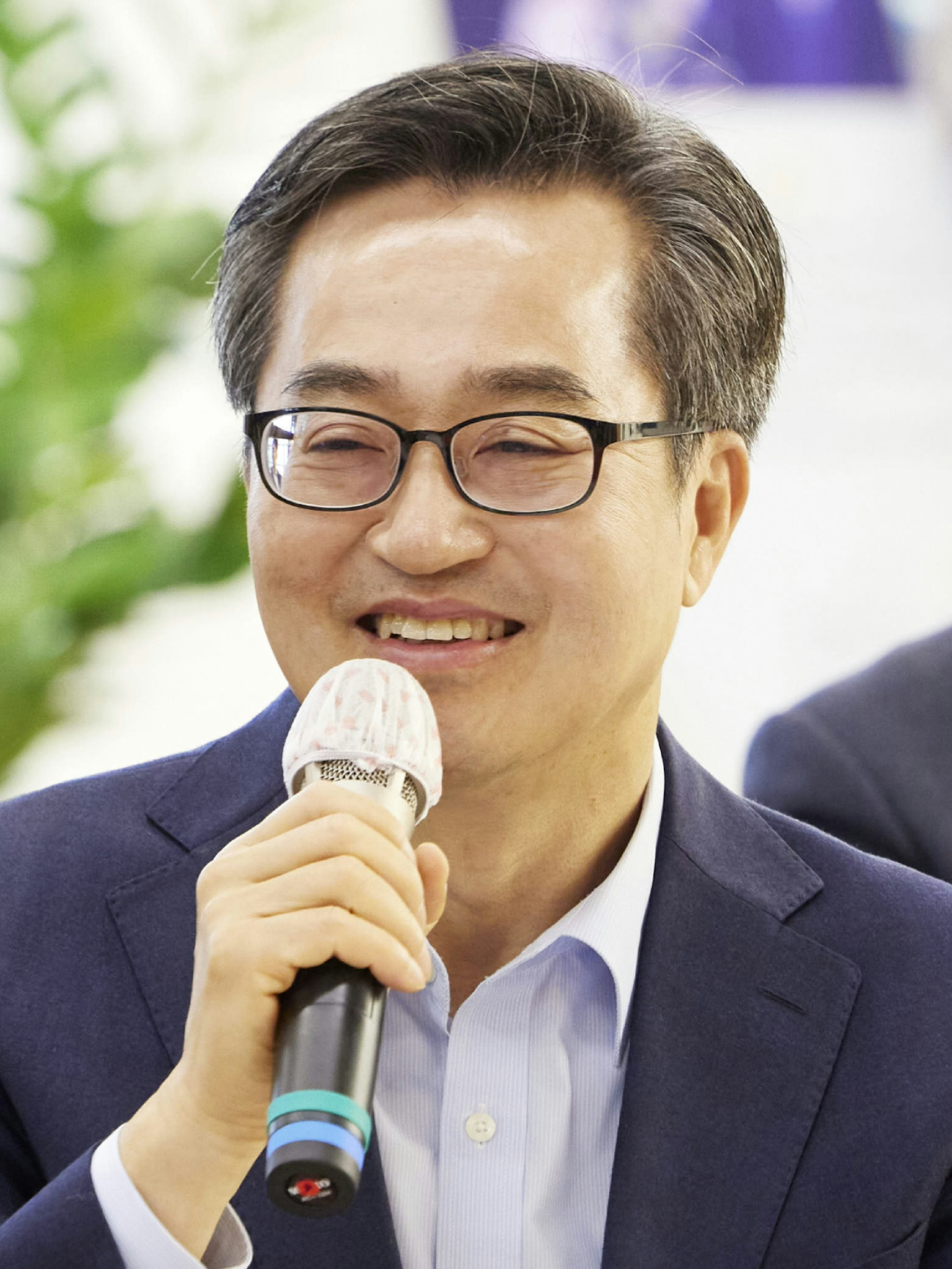
Kim Dong-yeon

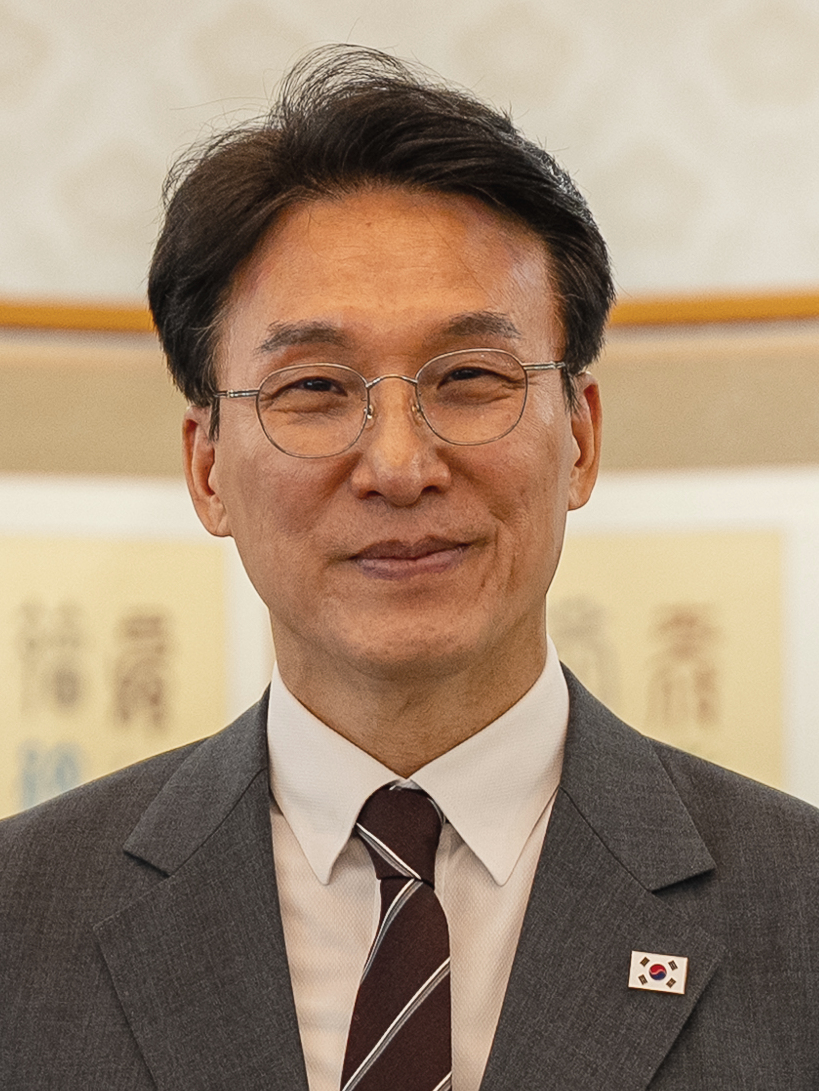
Kim Min-seok
- Jung Chung-rae, Leader of the Democratic Party (2025–2026); Member of the National Assembly (2020–present, 2012–2016, 2004–2008)
- Kim Dong-yeon, Governor of Gyeonggi Province (2022–2026); Deputy Prime Minister and Minister of Economy and Finance (2017–2018)
- Kim Min-seok, Leader of the Democratic Party (2026-present); Prime Minister (2025–2026); Leader of the Democratic Party (2016); Member of the National Assembly (2020–present, 1996–2002)

=== People Power Party ===
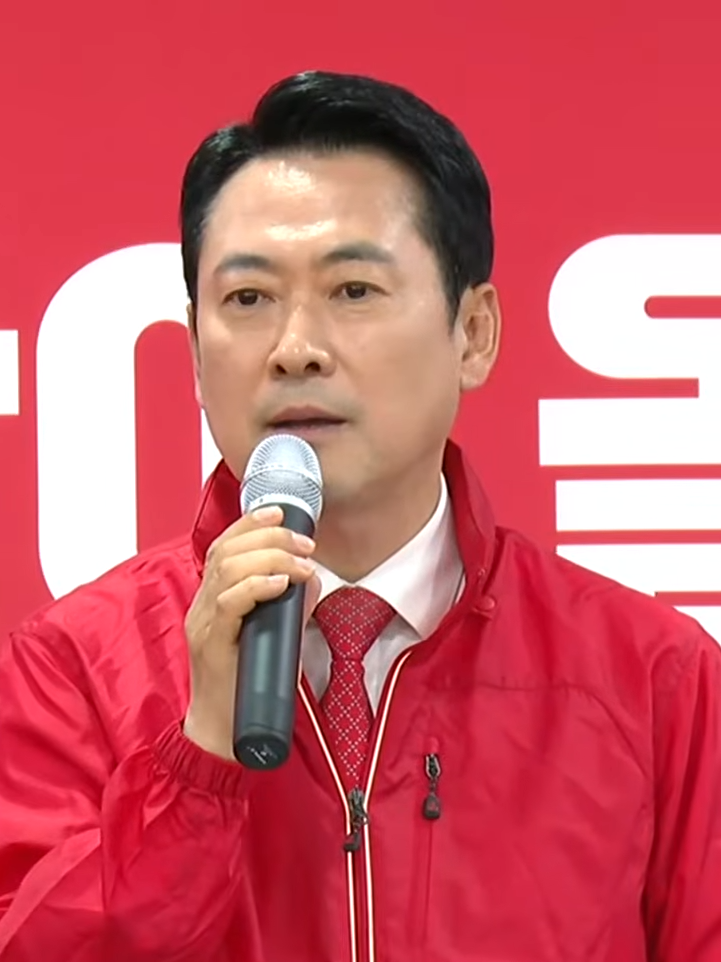
Jang Dong-hyeok

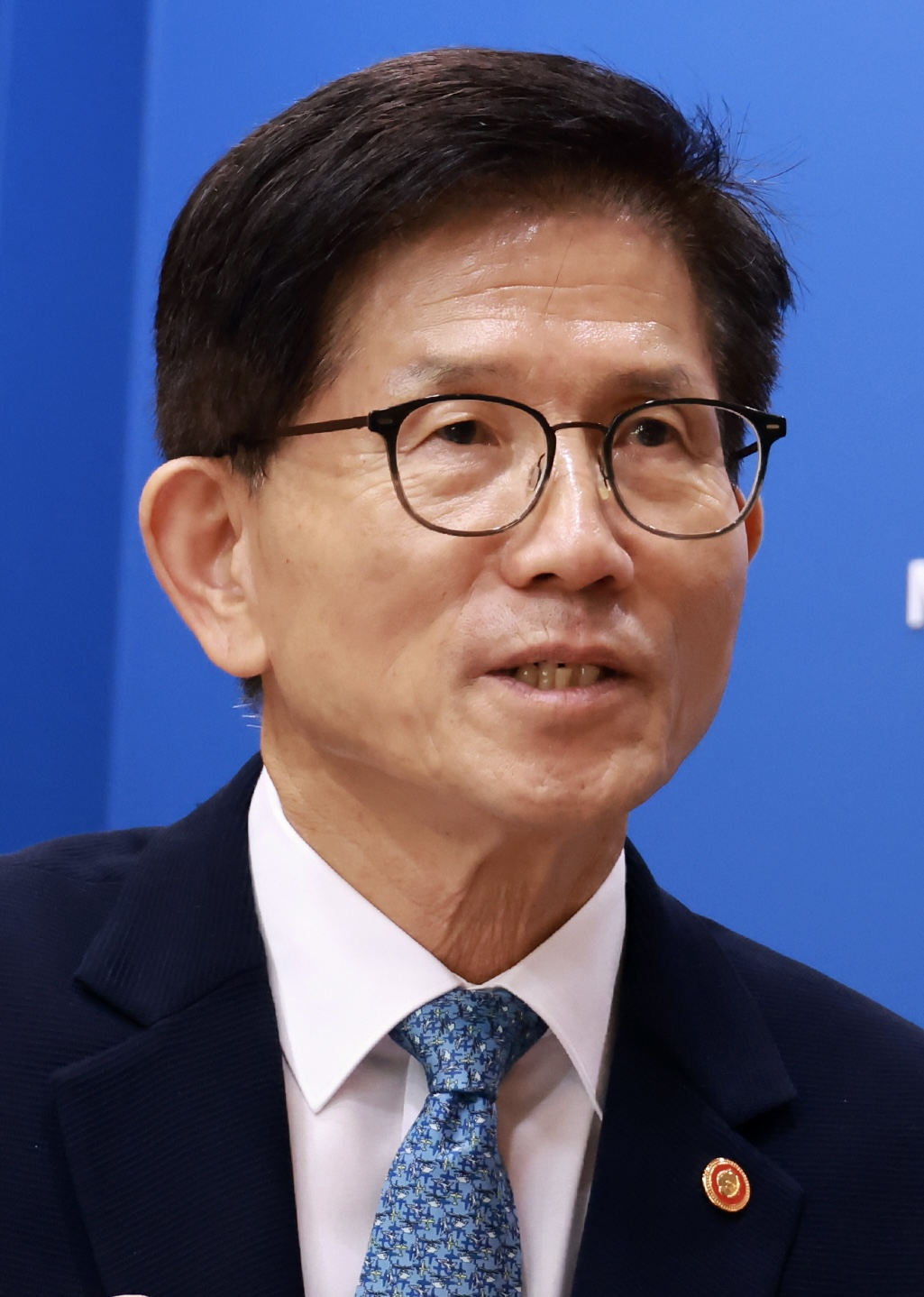
kim Moon-soo

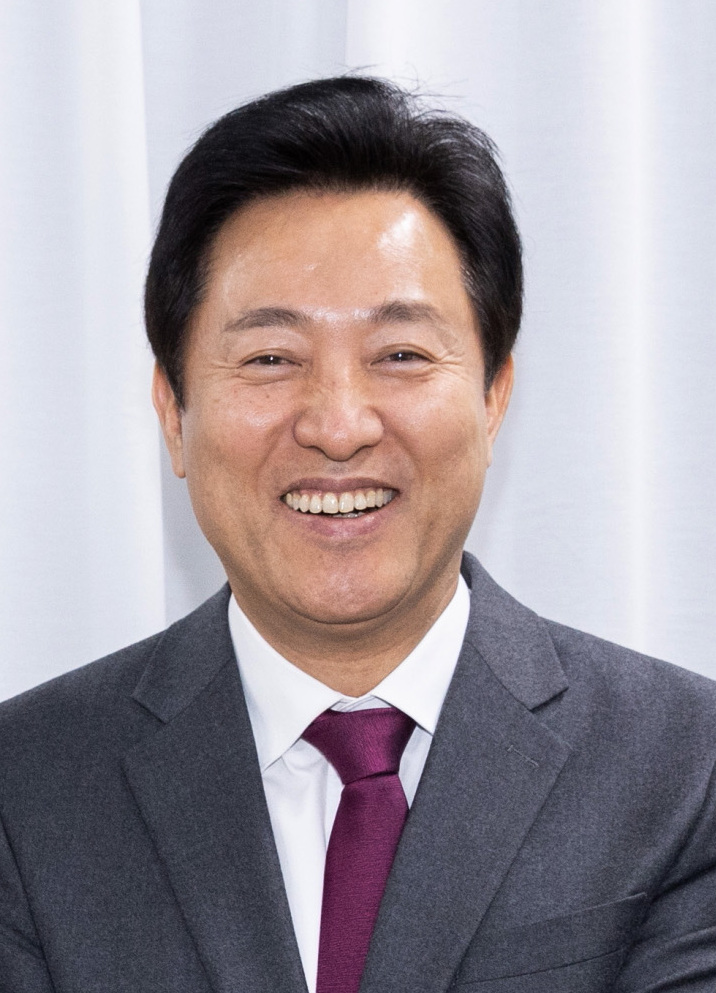
Oh Se-hoon
- Jang Dong-hyeok, Leader of the People Power Party (2025–present); Member of the National Assembly (2022–present)
- Kim Moon-soo, Minister of Employment and Labor (2024–2025); Governor of Gyeonggi Province (2006–2014); Member of the National Assembly (1996–2006)
- Oh Se-hoon, Mayor of Seoul (2021-present)

=== Reform Party ===
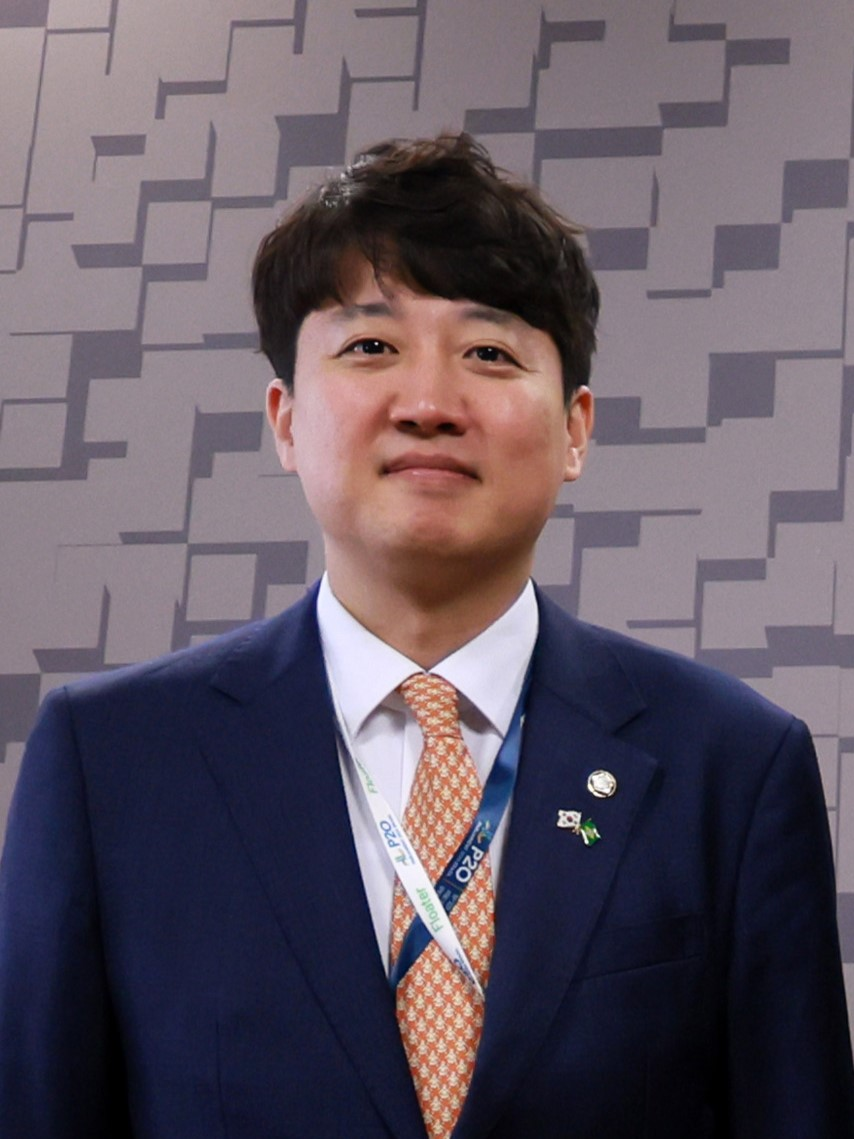
Lee Jun-seok
- Lee Jun-seok, Member of the National Assembly (2024-present);

=== Rebuilding Korea Party ===
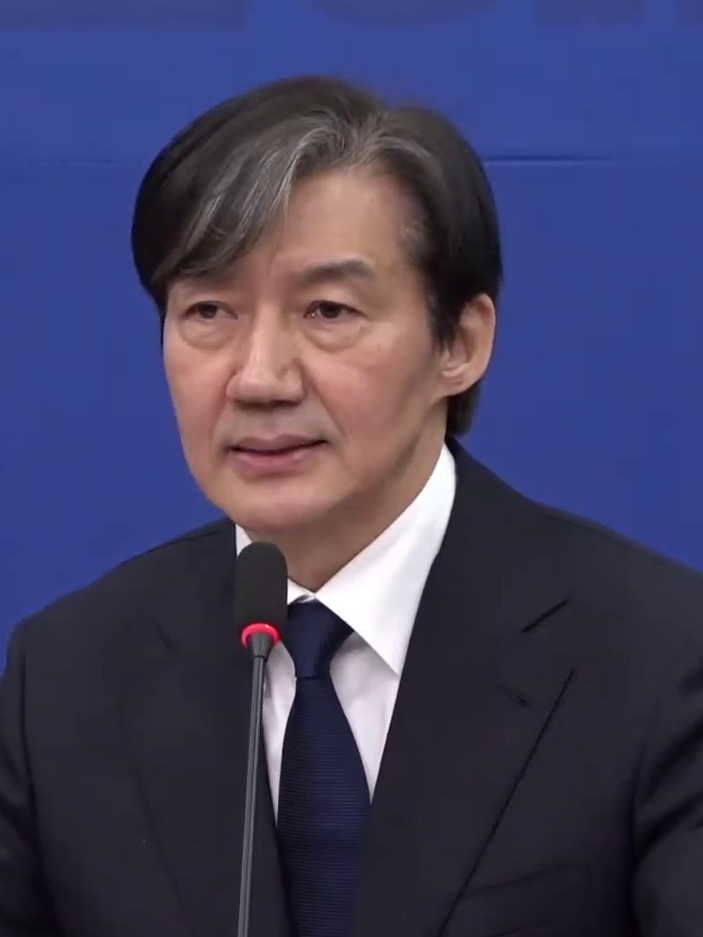
Cho Kuk
- Cho Kuk, Leader of the Rebuilding Korea Party (2025–2026, 2024); Member of the National Assembly (2024); Minister of Justice (2019)

=== Independent ===
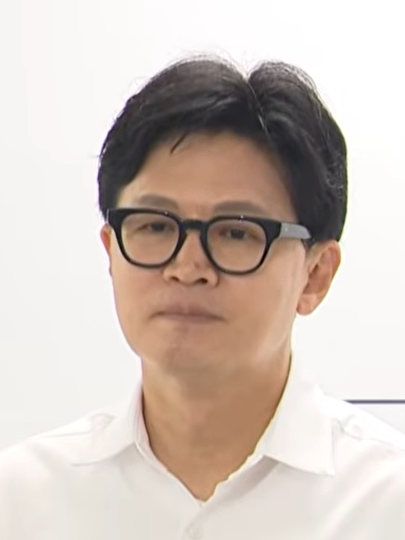
Han Dong-hoon
- Han Dong-hoon, Member of the National Assembly (2026–present); Leader of the People Power Party (2024); Minister of Justice (2022–2023)

== Opinion polls ==
=== 2026 ===
Fieldwork date	Sample size	Margin of error	Polling firm	DPK		RKP	PPP		IND	Others	Und./ no ans.	Lead
Fieldwork date	Sample size	Margin of error	Polling firm	Jung Chung-rae	Kim Min-seok	Cho Kuk	Jang Dong-hyeok	Oh Se-hoon	Han Dong-hoon	Others	Und./ no ans.	Lead
28–29 Sep	1,010	±3.1	Ace Research / Newsis	6.3	15.2	5.6	10.2	10.5	18.1	23.7 (Note: Kang Hoon-sik 7.9, Lee Jin-sook 8.1, Choo Mi-ae 3.2, Lee Jun-seok 2.0, Others 2.5)	10.5	2.9
28-29 Sep	1,002	±3.1	KIR / Cheonjiilbo	4.2	17.2	5.8	9.0	15.9	17.9	16.7 (Note: Lee Jin-sook 7.3, Choo Mi-ae 4.9, Others 4.5)	13.3	0.5
21-22 Sep	1,004	±3.1	KIR / Cheonjiilbo	5.6	21.9	7.1	8.4	13.5	16.9	13.8 (Note: Lee Jin-sook 7.3, Choo Mi-ae 3.1, Others 3.4)	12.6	5.0
19–21 Sep	2,007	±2.2	Jowon C&I / Straight News	6.7	14.8	8.6	11.9	12.6	18.1	17.8 (Note: Song Young-gil 5.5, Kim Boo-kyum 3.7, Choo Mi-ae 3.2, Lee Jun-seok 2.5, Others 2.9)	12.5	3.3
14-15 Sep	1,009	±3.1	KIR / Cheonjiilbo	4.6	15.6	7.6	8.8	11.6	18.7	23.2 (Note: Lee Jin-sook 11.3, Kang Hoon-sik 7.8, Others 4.1)	10.0	3.1
7-8 Sep	1,000	±3.1	KIR / Cheonjiilbo	6.6	16.4	6.6	10.0	13.3	15.1	20.4 (Note: Lee Jin-sook 9.2, Kang Hoon-sik 6.9, Others 4.3)	11.6	1.3
31 Oct-1 Sep	1,004	±3.1	KIR / Cheonjiilbo	8.7	16.7	7.1	10.9	13.1	11.6	21.7 (Note: Lee Jin-sook 10.2, Kang Hoon-sik 6.8, Others 4.7)	10.2	3.6
24-25 Aug	1,005	±3.1	KIR / Cheonjiilbo	10.2	15.7	6.7	10.2	12.4	13.2	21.5 (Note: Lee Jin-sook 9.2, Kang Hoon-sik 5.8, Others 6.5)	11.0	2.5
17-18 Aug	1,014	±3.1	KIR / Cheonjiilbo	10.7	18.3	7.5	10.4	11.3	9.2	22.6 (Note: Kang Hoon-sik 10.0, Lee Jin-sook 8.0, Others 4.6)	10.1	7.0
10-11 Aug	1,000	±3.1	KIR / Cheonjiilbo	6.6	15.1	7.9	11.5	13.5	11.5	19.0 (Note: Lee Jin-sook 7.8, Kang Hoon-sik 6.0, Others 5.2)	14.9	1.6
3-4 Aug	1,006	±3.1	KIR / Cheonjiilbo	6.5	17.8	8.3	11.0	8.4	13.9	21.9 (Note: Lee Jin-sook 8.0, Kang Hoon-sik 7.2, Others 6.7)	12.3	3.9
27-28 Jul	1,004	±3.1	KIR / Cheonjiilbo	8.7	16.3	7.7	13.5	12.1	10.6	18.5 (Note: Lee Jin-sook 7.0, Kang Hoon-sik 6.0, Others 5.5)	12.6	2.8
20-21 Jul	1,004	±3.1	KIR / Cheonjiilbo	6.5	12.8	7.6	14.4	12.6	13.8	17.6 (Note: Lee Jin-sook 6.0, Kang Hoon-sik 5.8, Others 5.8)	14.7	0.6
13-14 Jul	1,001	±3.1	KIR / Cheonjiilbo	7.7	13.9	—N/a	12.8	11.7	11.7	27.6 (Note: Kang Hoon-sik 8.1, Lee Jin-sook 7.0, Kim Boo-kyum 5.7, Others 6.8)	14.6	1.1
6-7 Jul	1,001	±3.1	KIR / Cheonjiilbo	6.8	13.7	—N/a	13.2	14.4	11.0	28.4 (Note: Kang Hoon-sik 9.0, Lee Jin-sook 7.5, Kim Boo-kyum 5.3, Others 6.6)	12.4	0.7
29-30 Jun	1,000	±3.1	KIR / Cheonjiilbo	4.6	15.1	—N/a	10.0	14.4	12.9	30.3 (Note: Choo Mi-ae 8.7, Kang Hoon-sik 7.9, Lee Jin-sook 7.1, Others 6.6)	12.8	2.2
22-23 Jun	1,004	±3.1	KIR / Cheonjiilbo	6.1	13.4	—N/a	11.7	15.2	11.6	30.8 (Note: Kang Hoon-sik 9.5, Lee Jin-sook 8.8, Choo Mi-ae 5.6, Others 6.9)	11.3	1.8
15-16 Jun	1,029	±3.1	KIR / Cheonjiilbo	4.4	15.7	—N/a	10.1	15.5	13.5	27.5 (Note: Kang Hoon-sik 9.7, Lee Jin-sook 6.0, Choo Mi-ae 4.2, Others 7.6)	13.4	0.2
9–11 Jun	1,002	±3.1	Gallup Korea	1	5	7	3	9	8	14 (Note: Kang Hoon-sik 2, Song Young-gil 1, Lee Jun-seok 1, Hwang Kyo-ahn 1, Lee Jin-sook 1, Kim Boo-kyum 1, Hong Joon-pyo 1, Others 6)	52	1
8-9 Jun	1,001	±3.1	KIR / Cheonjiilbo	4.0	13.3	—N/a	9.6	19.0	10.6	28.9 (Note: Kang Hoon-sik 12.0, Choo Mi-ae 6.0% Hwang Kyo-ahn 4.2, Others 6.7)	14.6	5.7
1-2 Jun	1,002	±3.1	KIR / Cheonjiilbo	6.6	9.8	11.4	10.0	—N/a	13.8	31.5 (Note: Kang Hoon-sik 11.5, Kim Moon-soo 6.0, Hwang Kyo-ahn 5.1, Others 8.9)	17.0	2.3
25 May	1,000	±3.1	KIR / Cheonjiilbo	8.9	10.8	11.1	9.4	—N/a	14.5	30.9 (Note: Kang Hoon-sik 9.7, Hwang Kyo-ahn 6.2, Kim Moon-soo 5.6, Others 9.4)	14.5	3.4
18-19 May	1,000	±3.1	KIR / Cheonjiilbo	6.6	11.6	11.5	9.1	—N/a	12.3	31.0 (Note: Kang Hoon-sik 9.7, Kim Moon-soo 7.8, Hwang Kyo-ahn 5.6, Others 7.9)	18.1	0.7
11-12 May	1,004	±3.1	KIR / Cheonjiilbo	8.8	9.2	9.8	8.8	—N/a	11.0	33.5 (Note: Kang Hoon-sik 9.5, Kim Moon-soo 8.9, Hwang Kyo-ahn 6.5, Others 8.6)	18.9	1.2
4 May	1,010	±3.1	KIR / Cheonjiilbo	7.1	9.1	11.0	9.7	—N/a	12.4	31.4 (Note: Kang Hoon-sik 11.3, Kim Moon-soo 8.0, Hwang Kyo-ahn 5.2, Others 6.9)	19.3	1.4
27–28 Apr	1,005	±3.1	KIR / Cheonjiilbo	8.8	11.1	10.3	9.6	—N/a	12.4	26.7 (Note: Kang Hoon-sik 9.0, Hwang Kyo-ahn 7.3, Lee Jun-seok 2.2, Others 8.2)	21.0	1.3
20–21 Apr	1,008	±3.1	KIR / Cheonjiilbo	8.4	11.9	11.3	10.4	—N/a	10.7	26.8 (Note: Kang Hoon-sik 8.5, Hwang Kyo-ahn 6.3, Lee Jun-seok 3.8, Others 8.2)	20.6	0.6
13–14 Apr	1,001	±3.1	KIR / Cheonjiilbo	7.4	12.4	12.4	9.9	—N/a	12.1	25.1 (Note: Hwang Kyo-ahn 6.8, Woo Won-shik 5.0, Lee Jun-seok 4.4, Others 8.9)	20.2	0.4
6–7 Apr	1,004	±3.1	KIR / Cheonjiilbo	9.5	15.2	11.8	11.3	—N/a	9.1	21.2 (Note: Hwang Kyo-ahn 9.3, Others 11.9)	21.9	3.4
30–31 Mar	1,005	±3.1	KIR / Cheonjiilbo	8.9	14.2	11.5	12.0	—N/a	10.0	20.1 (Note: Na Kyung-won 4.3, Others 15.8)	23.5	2.2
23–24 Mar	1,011	±3.1	KIR / Cheonjiilbo	10.2	14.4	9.7	14.9	—N/a	11.4	17.8 (Note: Na Kyung-won 4.2, Others 13.6)	21.6	0.5
16–17 Mar	1,007	±3.1	KIR / Cheonjiilbo	7.8	15.9	11.1	16.5	—N/a	9.6	15.2 (Note: Na Kyung-won 4.4, Others 10.8)	23.8	0.6
9–10 Mar	1,001	±3.1	KIR / Cheonjiilbo	7.2	13.5	11.5	18.6	—N/a	11.0	19.1 (Note: Na Kyung-won 3.5, Others 15.6)	19.0	5.1
3–5 Mar	1,001	±3.1	Gallup Korea	1	4	9	4	1	4	12 (Note: Song Young-gil 2, Lee Jun-seok 2, Kang Hoon-sik 1, Others 7)	64	5
2–3 Mar	1,001	±3.1	KIR / Cheonjiilbo	6.6	16.5	12.5	19.3	—N/a	8.8	16.4 (Note: Na Kyung-won 2.9, Others 13.5)	19.8	2.8
23–24 Feb	1,002	±3.1	KIR / Cheonjiilbo	6.7	17.2	13.1	17.5	—N/a	9.7	15.7 (Note: Na Kyung-won 3.2, Others 12.5)	20.1	0.3
9–10 Feb	1,006	±3.1	KIR / Cheonjiilbo	6.5	17.5	12.6	15.2	—N/a	11.6	17.3 (Note: Lee Jin-sook 5.2, Others 12.1)	19.4	2.3
2–3 Feb	1,003	±3.1	KIR / Cheonjiilbo	6.8	19.0	10.7	17.7	—N/a	8.9	16.5 (Note: Lee Jin-sook 3.6, Others 12.9)	19.4	1.3
26–27 Jan	1,001	±3.1	KIR / Cheonjiilbo	7.6	16.3	12.5	22.0	—N/a	11.3	12.2 (Note: Lee Jin-sook 2.9, Others 9.3)	18.0	5.7
12–13 Jan	1,011	±3.1	KIR / Cheonjiilbo	7.3	20.2	12.1	17.6	—N/a	10.1	14.6 (Note: Na Kyung-won 4.0, Others 10.6)	18.1	2.6
5–6 Jan	1,004	±3.1	KIR / Cheonjiilbo	7.4	18.3	12.7	17.6	—N/a	9.6	14.4 (Note: Na Kyung-won 3.8, Others 10.6)	20.0	0.7

=== 2025 ===
Fieldwork date	Sample size	Margin of error	Polling firm	DPK			RKP	PPP			NRP	Others	Und./ no ans.	Lead
Fieldwork date	Sample size	Margin of error	Polling firm	Jung Chung-rae	Kim Dong-yeon	Kim Min-seok	Cho Kuk	Jang Dong-hyeok	Oh Se-hoon	Han Dong-hoon	Lee Jun-seok	Others	Und./ no ans.	Lead
29–30 Dec	1,007	±3.1	KIR / Cheonjiilbo	7.6	—N/a	18.0	11.9	19.9	—N/a	9.6	—N/a	12.9 (Note: Na Kyung-won 4.8, Others 8.1)	20.1	1.9
20–21 Dec	1,001	±3.1	KIR / Cheonjiilbo	6.6	—N/a	18.8	13.1	16.1	—N/a	12.4	—N/a	12.1 (Note: Na Kyung-won 5.0, Others 7.1)	20.9	2.7
13–14 Dec	1,010	±3.1	KIR / Cheonjiilbo	6.9	—N/a	17.5	10.3	16.7	—N/a	12.9	—N/a	14.1 (Note: Na Kyung-won 5.9, Others 8.2)	21.6	0.8
6–7 Dec	1,000	±3.1	KIR / Cheonjiilbo	8.4	—N/a	16.5	12.1	20.5	—N/a	10.1	—N/a	10.0 (Note: Na Kyung-won 4.3, Others 5.7)	22.4	4.0
2–4 Dec	1,000	±3.1	Gallup Korea	3	1	7	8	4	2	4	3	10 (Note: Hong Joon-pyo 1, Woo Won-shik 1, Park Chan-dae 1, Others 7)	57	1
29–30 Nov	1,000	±3.1	KIR / Cheonjiilbo	5.9	—N/a	16.9	12.2	20.3	—N/a	12.3	—N/a	11.2 (Note: Na Kyung-won 3.7, Others 7.5)	21.2	3.4
22–23 Nov	1,003	±3.1	KIR / Cheonjiilbo	7.9	—N/a	19.4	10.0	20.2	—N/a	10.4	—N/a	7.1	20.4	0.8
15–16 Nov	1,005	±3.1	KIR / Cheonjiilbo	8.6	—N/a	18.3	10.7	17.3	—N/a	13.4	—N/a	9.3 (Note: Lee Jin-sook 4.2, Others 5.1)	22.4	1.0
2–3 Nov	1,005	±3.1	KIR / Cheonjiilbo	7.2	—N/a	16.3	13.1	18.6	—N/a	8.2	—N/a	11.1 (Note: Lee Jin-sook 4.2, Others 6.9)	25.5	2.3
20–21 Oct	1,002	±3.1	KIR / Cheonjiilbo	9.0	—N/a	13.6	14.5	17.0	—N/a	10.2	—N/a	13.3 (Note: Lee Jin-sook 6.4, Others 6.9)	22.4	2.5
13–14 Oct	1,007	±3.1	KIR / Cheonjiilbo	8.9	—N/a	13.3	12.4	16.0	—N/a	9.9	—N/a	15.6 (Note: Lee Jin-sook 6.2, Others 9.4)	23.9	2.7
7–8 Oct	1,001	±3.1	KIR / Cheonjiilbo	10.7	—N/a	13.1	12.7	17.8	—N/a	8.6	—N/a	12.7 (Note: Lee Jin-sook 6.9, Others 5.8)	24.4	4.7
30 Sep–1 Oct	1,000	±3.1	KIR / Cheonjiilbo	8.4	—N/a	13.3	12.3	21.3	—N/a	10.5	—N/a	10.2 (Note: Lee Jin-sook 3.7, Others 6.5)	24.0	8.0
28–29 Sep	1,016	±3.1	Ace Research / Newsis	8.9	3.2	14.3	12.4	18.3	6.3	8.2	4.9	12.7 (Note: Kim Moon-soo 5.5, Na Kyung-won 2.5, Kim Kyoung-soo 2.4, Others 2.3)	10.9	4.0
19–20 Sep	1,001	±3.1	KIR / Cheonjiilbo	—N/a	3.8	14.3	12.0	18.4	—N/a	9.2	—N/a	14.4 (Note: Kim Moon-soo 7.2, Others 7.2)	27.9	4.1
16–18 Sep	1,001	±3.1	Gallup Korea	4	—N/a	3	8	7	1	3	4	12 (Note: Kim Moon-soo 3, Others 9)	58	1
9–10 Sep	1,001	±3.1	KIR / Cheonjiilbo	14.3	3.3	—N/a	14.9	20.6	6.7	—N/a	5.7	15.6 (Note: Kim Moon-soo 7.9, Kang Hoon-sik 2.2, Others 5.5)	18.9	5.7

== See also ==
- Opinion polling on the Lee Jae Myung presidency
