= Jangheung Wi clan =

Korean clan from South Jeolla Province

- Country: Korea
- Current region: Jangheung County
- Founder: Wi Gyeong
- Connected members: Wi Ha-joon; Wi Seo-yeong; Michelle Wie; Wi Seong-gon
- Website: http://jhwi.or.kr/

Jangheung Wi clan (Korean: 장흥 위씨; Hanja: 長興 魏氏) is one of the Korean clans. Their Bon-gwan is in Jangheung County, South Jeolla Province. According to the research held in 2015, the number of Jangheung Wi clan’s member was 30450. Wi clan was a kind of naturalized clan in Tang dynasty. Their founder was Wi Gyeong, his ancestry can be traced back to the ruling family of state of Wei. Emperor Taizong of Tang send him as one of the Eight Scholars (Hanja: 八學士) because Queen Seondeok in Silla appealed to send scholars to Tang dynasty in 638. After Wi Gyeong went to Silla, he was appointed as a Minister or Secretary (尚書, shàngshū). Then, he founded Jangheung Wi clan.

== See also ==
- Korean clan names of foreign origin
