= Han Dong-hoon =

South Korean politician (born 1973)

- 한동훈
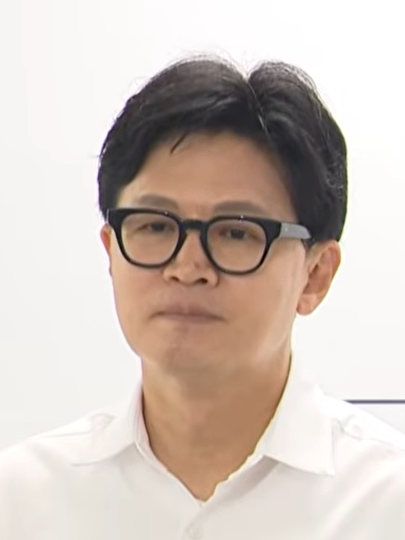
- Han in 2026

Member of the National Assembly
- Incumbent
- Assumed office 4 June 2026
- Preceded by: Chun Jae-soo
- Constituency: Busan Buk A

Leader of the People Power Party
- In office 23 July 2024 – 16 December 2024
- Preceded by: Hwang Woo-yea (acting)
- Succeeded by: Kweon Seong-dong (acting)
- Interim; 26 December 2023 – 11 April 2024
- Preceded by: Yoon Jae-ok (acting)
- Succeeded by: Yoon Jae-ok (acting)

Minister of Justice
- In office 17 May 2022 – 21 December 2023
- President: Yoon Suk Yeol
- Prime Minister: Han Duck-soo
- Preceded by: Park Beom-kye
- Succeeded by: Park Sung-jae

Personal details
- Born: 9 April 1973 (age 53) Seoul, South Korea
- Party: Independent (since 2026)
- Other political affiliations: People Power Party (2023–2026)
- Spouse: Jin Eun-jeong
- Children: 2
- Education: Seoul National University (LLB); Columbia University (LLM)

Military service
- Allegiance: South Korea
- Branch/service: Republic of Korea Air Force
- Years of service: 1998–2001
- Rank: Captain (대위)
- Unit: Military advocate

Korean name
- Hangul: 한동훈
- Hanja: 韓東勳
- RR: Han Donghun
- MR: Han Tonghun

Han Dong-hoon (Korean: 한동훈; born 9 April 1973) is a South Korean politician and prosecutor who has served as the member of the National Assembly for Busan Buk A since 2026. A political independent, he served as the leader of the People Power Party (PPP) from July to December 2024 and as the 69th minister of justice from May 2022 to December 2023 under the cabinet of Yoon Suk Yeol.

Before joining politics, Han played a key role as an anti-corruption prosecutor alongside Yoon Suk Yeol in convicting former presidents Park Geun-hye and Lee Myung-bak, Samsung executive Lee Jae-yong, and family members of former minister of justice Cho Kuk. Han served as a principal deputy when Yoon held senior positions in the Supreme Prosecutors' Office of Korea.

== Early life and education ==
Han was born on 9 April 1973, in Seoul, where he completed his high school education. He then attended Seoul National University's law school, where he obtained his Bachelor of Law degree. In 1995, while still in college, he passed the bar exam and then attended the Judicial Research and Training Institute (27th class). His first assignment as a legal professional was to serve as a military advocate in the Republic of Korea Air Force and finished his military duties with the rank of captain. He obtained a master's degree in law from Columbia Law School in New York in 2005 and was admitted to the New York State Bar.

== Career ==
=== Prosecutorial career (2001–2021) ===
In 2001, Han was appointed to the Seoul District Prosecutors' Office and began his career as a prosecutor.

When he was appointed to the Central Investigation Department of the Supreme Prosecutors' Office in 2003, he first met with Yoon Suk Yeol to investigate SK Group's accounting fraud and helped arrest chairman Chey Tae-won, and investigated the presidential slush fund case, Hyundai Motor corruption case, and the Lone Star sale case.

In 2016, Park Young-soo's special prosecutor team investigated the case of the government manipulation of state affairs with Yoon Suk Yeol investigation team leader and arrested Lee Jae-yong, vice chairman of Samsung Electronics.

In 2017, Han was appointed the third deputy prosecutor of the Seoul Central District Prosecutors' Office, which oversees anti-corruption and special investigations, and assisted Yoon Suk Yeol when he was the 3rd deputy prosecutor. He led the arrest of former President Lee Myung-bak by revealing that he was the real owner of auto parts maker "DAS" and investigated former Chief Justice Yang Sung-tae's alleged abuse of judicial administrative power and handed over a large number of former and current high-ranking judges to trial.

In 2019, he was promoted to the chief prosecutor and led the investigation of the family of the Minister of Justice Cho Kuk as the head of the anti-corruption and power department, even though he was widely regarded as corrupt and immoral. In 2020, then Justice Minister Choo Mi-ae demoted Han to Busan High Prosecutors' Office as deputy prosecutor in the first prosecution personnel reshuffle.

In June 2020, he was demoted to a researcher at the Legal Research and Training Institute due to the 'Channel A scandal'.

In June 2021, due to the Ministry of Justice's personnel reshuffle with the prosecution, he was demoted again to the vice president of the Judicial Research and Training Institute.

=== Political career ===
On 17 May 2022, Han was appointed the 69th Minister of Justice of the Republic of Korea.

In his first speech as Justice Minister, Han stated that he would revive the Seoul Southern District Prosecutors Office's Joint Securities Crime Division (증권범죄합수단) that was abolished by his predecessor Choo Mi-ae. Han stepped down from the minister post on 21 December 2023 to take over as the interim leader of the ruling People Power Party.

Han took office as the People Power Party's emergency committee chairman on 26 December 2023.

==== Conflict with Yoon Suk Yeol ====
Despite his history as Minister of Justice in Yoon Suk Yeol cabinet, media reports often highlighted the 'conflict' between Han as ruling party leader and the government. In January 2024, Han received a request from the President's Office to resign as emergency committee chairman of PPP. The media claimed that this was due to his remarks regarding First Lady Kim Keon-hee's suspicions of luxury bag corruption. He rejected calls for his resignation and reaffirmed his previous position about the first lady on 22 January. However, after a brief meeting with the president at the scene of the fire at the market in Seocheon on 23 January he made no further mention of Kim Keon-hee. Kim Kyung-yul, another major figure who was appointed to the emergency committee by Han and criticized the first lady, announced that he would not run in 2024 election.

==== 2024 election ====
In the process of advocating for the abolition of the privilege of non-arrest of National Assembly members, Han stated that he would nominate only those who pledged to give up the privilege of non-arrest as candidates for the 2024 election.

During the election period, Han responded to the theory of judgment on the Yoon Suk Yeol regime put forward by the Democratic Party of Korea by using the term Lee Cho Judgment (이조심판). He focused on attacking Lee Jae-myung and Cho Kuk, the leaders of the two major opposition parties, as 'criminals', formed the Lee Cho Judgment Special Committee, and made it an election strategy to highlight their past controversies. As the election period neared its end, he focused on highlighting the controversies of some candidates from DPK, including Yang Moon-seok and Kim Jun-hyuk.

He resigned from his position as chairman of PPP emergency committee on 11 April, after losing the election.

==== Leader of the PPP ====
On 23 July 2024, Han was elected leader of the PPP.

Han oversaw perhaps the most tumultuous time of South Korean politics since the impeachment of Park Geun-hye, with Yoon, who he was previously affiliated with, having declared martial law and attempting to arrest Han and several other politicians. Han was the only politician from the PPP to be listed as those to be arrested.

Han initially supported the PPP boycott of the first impeachment trial of Yoon, believing that Yoon would willingly hand over his power to both himself and Prime Minister Han Duck-soo. However, as it became clear that Yoon had refused to hand over power peacefully, he began to support the second impeachment vote, stating that members must attend and asking them to "vote their conscience".

After the impeachment motion against Yoon passed in the National Assembly on 14 December, Han resigned as party leader on 16 December 2024.

=== Subsequent events ===
In February 2025, Han released his memoir titled The People Come First, an account of events during Yoon's martial law declaration leading to his impeachment and Han's resignation as PPP leader.

On 10 April 2025, Han announced his candidacy for the 2025 South Korean presidential election, but lost in the PPP primary to Kim Moon-soo. He was later removed from the People Power Party on January 29, 2026.

Han achieved a political comeback by winning a highly contested parliamentary by-election in Busan's Buk-A constituency, held alongside the 2026 South Korean local elections. He secured a narrow victory with 42.96 percent of the vote, defeating Democratic Party of Korea (DPK) nominee Ha Jung-woo by a margin of just 1,382 votes, while PPP candidate Park Min-shik finished third with 15.76 percent.

== Election results ==
Year	Elections	Constituency	Political party	Votes (%)	Results
2026	2026 By-Elections	Buk A (Busan)	Independent	35,056 (42.96%)	Won
