= Dalseong =

- Hangul: 달성
- RR: Dalseong
- MR: Talsŏng

Dalseong (Korean: 달성) is a Korean-language word that can refer to:

== Places ==
- Dalseong County in Daegu, South Korea
- Dalseong Park in Daegu, South Korea
  - Dalseong, the fortress that used to exist on the site of the park
- Dalseong (constituency), a constituency of the National Assembly of South Korea

== People ==
- Queen Jeongseong; one of her titles was Dalseong
