= Kim Oh-soo =

South Korean prosecutor (born 1963)

- 김오수
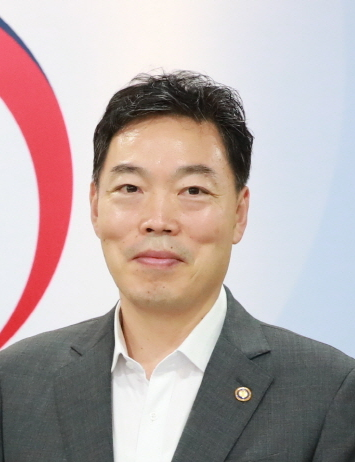
- Kim in 2019

Prosecutor General of South Korea
- In office 1 June 2021 – 6 May 2022
- President: Moon Jae-in
- Preceded by: Yoon Suk Yeol; Cho Nam-kwan (acting)
- Succeeded by: Lee One-seok

Minister of Justice
- Interim
- In office 14 October 2019 – 1 January 2020
- President: Moon Jae-in
- Preceded by: Cho Kuk
- Succeeded by: Choo Mi-ae

Deputy Minister of Justice
- In office 22 June 2018 – 27 April 2020
- President: Moon Jae-in
- Minister: Park Sang-ki; Cho Kuk; Choo Mi-ae
- Preceded by: Lee Keum-ro
- Succeeded by: Goh Ki-young

Personal details
- Born: January 9, 1963 (age 63) Yeonggwang County, South Jeolla Province, South Korea
- Party: Independent
- Spouse: Cheon Kye-sook
- Children: 2
- Education: Seoul National University
- Occupation: Prosecutor

- Kim Oh-soo
- Hangul: 김오수
- Hanja: 金浯洙
- RR: Gim Osu
- MR: Kim Osu

Kim Oh-soo (Korean: 김오수; born 9 January 1963) is a South Korean prosecutor who has served as the Prosecutor General from 2021 to 2022. He previously served as the Deputy Minister of Justice from 2018 to 2020, and briefly the interim Minister of Justice following the resignation of Cho Kuk.

== Early life and education ==
Kim was born in 1963 at Hongnong-eup, Yeonggwang County, South Jeolla Province, South Korea. He studied at Hongnong Secondary School and Gwangju Daedong High School before attending Seoul National University where he studied law.

== Career ==
After qualifying for the bar in 1988, Kim started his career at Incheon District Prosecutor's Office in 1994. He gained public attention when he investigated corruption allegation of the former Chancellor of Yonsei University, Jung Chang-young in 2005. He also investigated alleged corruption of Daewoo Shipbuilding & Marine Engineering and Hyosung in 2009.

He has also been working at the Ministry of Justice for a long time, where he worked together with Park Sang-ki, Cho Kuk and Choo Mi-ae — all were the Justice Minister under the president Moon Jae-in.

In 2018, he was appointed the Deputy Minister of Justice, replacing Lee Keum-ro. Following the resignation of controversial Cho Kuk, Kim became the interim Justice Minister until Choo Mi-ae was appointed to the position.

On 3 May 2021, Kim was nominated the Prosecutor General after the resignation of Yoon Suk Yeol who has been in conflict with the Moon Jae-in government. He favours the prosecution reform of the Moon government, such as establishing the Corruption Investigation Office for High-ranking Officials. On 31 May, the National Assembly voted in favour of his appointment, despite the boycott of the oppositions.

Kim resigned from his post and submitted his resignation to outgoing President Moon on 6 May 2022, days before Moon left office. Kim resigned in protest against the outgoing Democratic Party's legislation to strip the prosecutor service of investigative powers.

== Personal life ==
He married Cheon Kye-sook; the couple has a son and a daughter.
