= Dalseong (constituency) =

Constituency in Daegu, South Korea

- Single-member constituency for the National Assembly
- Location of the constituency
- District(s): Dalseong County
- Region: Daegu
- Electorate: 210,129 (2026)

Current constituency
- Created: 1996
- Seats: 1
- Party: People Power Party
- Member: Lee Jin-sook
- Created from: Dalseong–Goryeong

Dalseong (Korean: 달성군) is a constituency of the National Assembly of South Korea. The constituency consists of Dalseong County, Daegu. As of 2026, 210,129 eligible voters were registered in the constituency. The constituency was created in 1996 from the Dalseong–Goryeong constituency.

== History ==
Dalseong, like all other constituencies located in the Daegu–Gyeongbuk region is widely considered a stronghold for the conservative People Power Party. Accordingly, Dalseong has always elected members of conservative political parties to represent the constituency in the National Assembly. The constituency has been represented by floor leader of People Power Party Choo Kyung-ho since 2016.

Former SsangYong Group CEO Kim Suk-won of the conservative New Korea Party was the first member to represent the constituency having won with 62.71% of the vote in the 1996 legislative election. However Kim resigned two years later in 1998 in order to return to the SsangYong Group as CEO.

A by-election was held in 1998 between Park Geun-hye of the conservative Grand National Party and Eom Sam-tak of the centrist-liberal National Congress for New Politics, which saw Park win with 62.5% of the vote. Park won re-election in 2000 with 61.39% of the vote, once again defeating Eom Sam-tak of the Millennium Democratic Party. In the following election, Park won in a landslide with 70.03% of the vote. Park won re-election with a record 88.57% of the vote in 2008, receiving the second highest share of votes in the election. Park did not run for re-election in 2012, having previously taken over as acting leader of the Grand National Party in December 2011 via a party emergency committee.

Former Dalseong County Mayor Lee Jong-jin succeeded Park, having garnered 55.63% of the vote. Ahead of the 2016 election, Lee announced that he would not stand for re-election. He was succeeded by Choo Kyung-ho, who had served as Deputy Minister of Economy and Finance and the Chairman of the Office for Government Policy Coordination under President Park Geun-hye. Choo won re-election to the seat in 2020 and 2024, with 67.33% and 75.31% of the vote respectively. Choo was the only member of the ruling People Power Party (PPP) to receive more than 100,000 votes in the 2024 legislative election. Choo resigned on 30 April 2026 to run for Mayor of Daegu in the local elections held in the same year.

Former journalist Lee Jin-sook of the PPP won the seat in a by-election held in June 2026.

== Boundaries ==
The constituency encompasses the entirety of Dalseong County which includes the towns of Hwawon-eup, Nongong-eup, Dasa-eup, Yuga-eup, Okpo-eup, Hyeonpung-eup, and the townships of Gachang-myeon, Habin-myeon, and Guji-myeon. It borders the constituencies of Dalseo B, Jung–Nam, and Suseong B to the north, Goryeong–Seongju–Chilgok to the west, Miryang–Uiryeong–Haman–Changnyeong and Yeongcheon–Cheondo to the south, and Gyeongsan to the east.

== List of members of the National Assembly ==
Election	Member	Party	Dates	Notes
1996	Kim Suk-won	New Korea	1996–1998	CEO of the SsangYong Group (1975–1995) Resigned in February 1998 to return as the CEO of SsangYong Group
April 1998 by-election	Park Geun-hye	Grand National	1998–2012	Daughter of President Park Chung Hee Chairman of the Grand National Party (2004–2006) Acting Leader of the Grand National Party and Saenuri Party (2011–2012) President of South Korea (2013–2017)
2000	Park Geun-hye	Grand National	1998–2012	Daughter of President Park Chung Hee Chairman of the Grand National Party (2004–2006) Acting Leader of the Grand National Party and Saenuri Party (2011–2012) President of South Korea (2013–2017)
2004	Park Geun-hye	Grand National	1998–2012	Daughter of President Park Chung Hee Chairman of the Grand National Party (2004–2006) Acting Leader of the Grand National Party and Saenuri Party (2011–2012) President of South Korea (2013–2017)
2008	Park Geun-hye	Grand National	1998–2012	Daughter of President Park Chung Hee Chairman of the Grand National Party (2004–2006) Acting Leader of the Grand National Party and Saenuri Party (2011–2012) President of South Korea (2013–2017)
2012	Lee Jong-jin	Saenuri	2012–2016	Mayor of Dalseong County (2006–2010)
2016	Choo Kyung-ho	Saenuri	2016–2026	Deputy Minister of Economy and Finance (2013–2014) Chairman of the Office for Government Policy Coordination (2014–2016) Deputy Prime Minister and Minister of Economy and Finance (2022–2023) Floor leader of the People Power Party (2024) Resigned on 30 April 2026 to run for Mayor of Daegu Mayor of Daegu (2026–)
2020	Choo Kyung-ho	United Future	2016–2026	Deputy Minister of Economy and Finance (2013–2014) Chairman of the Office for Government Policy Coordination (2014–2016) Deputy Prime Minister and Minister of Economy and Finance (2022–2023) Floor leader of the People Power Party (2024) Resigned on 30 April 2026 to run for Mayor of Daegu Mayor of Daegu (2026–)
2024	Choo Kyung-ho	People Power	2016–2026	Deputy Minister of Economy and Finance (2013–2014) Chairman of the Office for Government Policy Coordination (2014–2016) Deputy Prime Minister and Minister of Economy and Finance (2022–2023) Floor leader of the People Power Party (2024) Resigned on 30 April 2026 to run for Mayor of Daegu Mayor of Daegu (2026–)
2026 by-election	Lee Jin-sook	People Power	2026–present	

== Election results ==
=== 2026 by-election ===
2026 by-election: Dalseong
Party	Candidate	Votes	%	±%
People Power	Lee Jin-sook	78,174	59.06	▼16.25
Democratic	Park Hyung-ryong	54,169	40.93	▲16.25
Rejected ballots		3,536	–	
Turnout		135,879	64.66	▲1.71
Registered electors		210,129		
People Power hold		Swing		

=== 2024 ===
Legislative Election 2024: Dalseong
Party	Candidate	Votes	%	±%
People Power	Choo Kyung-ho	100,054	75.31	▲7.98
Democratic	Park Hyung-ryong	32,955	24.68	▼2.33
Rejected ballots		1,621	–	
Turnout		135,120	62.95	▼1.25
Registered electors		214,642		
People Power hold		Swing		

=== 2020 ===
Legislative Election 2020: Dalseong
Party	Candidate	Votes	%	±%
United Future	Choo Kyung-ho	88,846	67.33	▲19.26
Democratic	Park Hyung-ryong	35,649	27.01	▲12.3
Independent	Seo Sang-ki	4,147	3.14	new
Minjung	Cho Jung-hoon	1,992	1.50	new
National Revolutionary	Kim Ji-young	1,304	0.98	new
Rejected ballots		1,673	–	
Turnout		133,611	64.20	▲10.0
Registered electors		208,115		
United Future hold		Swing		

=== 2016 ===
Legislative Election 2016: Dalseong
Party	Candidate	Votes	%	±%
Saenuri	Choo Kyung-ho	40,355	48.07	▼7.56
Independent	Koo Sung-jae	26,389	31.44	▲8.14
Democratic	Cho Ki-seok	12,348	14.71	▼6.35
Independent	Cho Jung-hoon	4,842	5.76	new
Rejected ballots		1,332	–	
Turnout		85,266	54.20	▲1.85
Registered electors		157,259		
Saenuri hold		Swing		

=== 2012 ===
Legislative Election 2012: Dalseong
Party	Candidate	Votes	%	±%
Saenuri	Lee Jong-jin	40,276	55.63	▼32.94
Independent	Koo Sung-jae	16,869	23.30	new
Democratic United	Kim Jin-hyang	15,246	21.06	new
Rejected ballots		802	–	
Turnout		73,193	52.35	▲5.05
Registered electors		139,824		
Saenuri hold		Swing		

=== 2008 ===
Legislative Election 2008: Dalseong
Party	Candidate	Votes	%	±%
Grand National	Park Geun-hye	50,149	88.57	▲18.54
Democratic Labor	Noh Yoon-jo	5,080	8.97	▲2.22
Family Party for Peace and Unity	Lim Jung-heon	1,386	2.44	new
Rejected ballots		801	–	
Turnout		57,416	47.30	▼11.39
Registered electors		121,397		
Grand National hold		Swing		

=== 2004 ===
Legislative Election 2004: Dalseong
Party	Candidate	Votes	%	±%
Grand National	Park Geun-hye	45,298	70.03	▲8.64
Uri	Yoon Yong-hee	15,014	23.21	new
Democratic Labor	Heo Kyung-do	4,367	6.75	new
Rejected ballots		953	–	
Turnout		65,663	58.69	▼4.82
Registered electors		111,889		
Grand National hold		Swing		

=== 2000 ===
Legislative Election 2000: Dalseong
Party	Candidate	Votes	%	±%
Grand National	Park Geun-hye	37,805	61.39	▼1.11
Millennium Democratic	Eom Sam-tak	23,774	38.60	new
Rejected ballots		1,159	–	
Turnout		62,738	63.51	▲4.08
Registered electors		94,605		
Grand National hold		Swing		

=== 1998 (by-election) ===
1998 by-election: Dalseong
Party	Candidate	Votes	%	±%
Grand National	Park Geun-hye	34,271	62.50	▼0.21
National Congress	Eom Sam-tak	20,563	37.50	▲33.01
Rejected ballots		1,389	–	
Turnout		56,223	59.43	▼4.42
Registered electors		94,605		
Grand National hold		Swing		

=== 1996 ===
Legislative Election 1996: Dalseong
Party	Candidate	Votes	%	±%
New Korea	Kim Suk-won	31,958	62.71	–
United Liberal Democrats	Kim Jung-hoon	16,707	32.78	–
National Congress	Lee Won-chul	2,289	4.49	–
Rejected ballots		2,584	–	
Turnout		53,538	63.85	–
Registered electors		83,854		
New Korea win (new seat)				

== See also ==
- List of constituencies of the National Assembly of South Korea
