= Gwangjin B =

Constituency in Seoul, South Korea

- Single-member constituency for the National Assembly
- Location of the constituency
- District(s): Gwangjin District (part)
- Region: Seoul
- Electorate: 151,508 (2024)

Current constituency
- Created: 1996
- Seats: 1
- Party: Democratic Party
- Member: Ko Min-jung
- Council constituency: Gwangjin 3rd district Gwangjin 4th district
- Created from: Seongdong C

Gwangjin B (Korean: 광진구 을) is a constituency of the National Assembly of South Korea. The constituency consists of part of Gwangjin District, Seoul. As of 2024, 151,508 eligible voters were registered in the constituency.

== List of members of the National Assembly ==
Election	Member	Party	Dates	Notes
1996	Choo Mi-ae	National Congress	1996–2004	
2000	Choo Mi-ae	Millennium Democratic	1996–2004	
2004	Kim Hyung-ju	Uri	2004–2008	Deputy Mayor of Seoul (2011–2012)
2008	Choo Mi-ae	Democratic	2008–2020	Leader of the Democratic Party (2016–2018); Minister of Justice (2020–2021); Governor of Gyeonggi Province (2026–)
2012	Choo Mi-ae	Democratic United	2008–2020	Leader of the Democratic Party (2016–2018); Minister of Justice (2020–2021); Governor of Gyeonggi Province (2026–)
2016	Choo Mi-ae	Democratic	2008–2020	Leader of the Democratic Party (2016–2018); Minister of Justice (2020–2021); Governor of Gyeonggi Province (2026–)
2020	Ko Min-jung	Democratic	2020–present	Presidential Spokesperson of South Korea (2019-2020)
2024	Ko Min-jung	Democratic	2020–present	Presidential Spokesperson of South Korea (2019-2020)

== Election results ==
=== 2024 ===
Legislative Election 2024: Gwangjin B
Party	Candidate	Votes	%	±%
Democratic	Ko Min-jung	53,362	51.47	▲1.1
People Power	Oh Shin-hwan	49,347	47.60	▼0.22
Korea National	Seo Jeong-min	956	0.92	new
Rejected ballots		1,338	–	
Turnout		105,003	69.31	▼1.18
Registered electors		151,508		
Democratic hold		Swing		

=== 2020 ===
Legislative Election 2020: Gwangjin B
Party	Candidate	Votes	%	±%
Democratic	Ko Min-jung	54,210	50.4	+1.9
United Future	Oh Se-hoon	51,464	47.8	+10.6
National Revolutionary Dividends	Heo Jeong-yeon	370	0.3	new
Mirae	Oh Tae-yang	1,574	1.5	new
Rejected ballots		958	–	–
Turnout		108,576	71.2	+11.4
Registered electors		152,526		
Democratic hold		Swing		

=== 2016 ===
Legislative Election 2016: Gwangjin B
Party	Candidate	Votes	%	±%
Democratic	Choo Mi-ae	43,980	48.5	−6.7
Saenuri	Jeong Joon-gil	33,701	37.2	−1.8
People	Hwang In-cheol	12,938	14.3	new
Rejected ballots		994	–	–
Turnout		91,613	59.8	+6.4
Registered electors		153,205		
Democratic hold		Swing		

=== 2012 ===
Legislative Election 2012: Gwangjin B
Party	Candidate	Votes	%	±%
Democratic United	Choo Mi-ae	45,980	55.2	+3.9
Saenuri	Jeong Joon-gil	32,456	39.0	−2.3
Independent	Gil Gi-yeon	3,707	4.4	new
Liberty Forward	Kim Hong-joon	1,168	1.4	−0.8
Rejected ballots		486	–	–
Turnout		83,797	53.4	+8.7
Registered electors		155,196		
Democratic United hold		Swing		

=== 2008 ===
Legislative Election 2008: Gwangjin B
Party	Candidate	Votes	%	±%
United Democratic	Choo Mi-ae	34,854	51.3	+21.2
Grand National	Park Myung-hwan	24,914	36.7	+7.6
Pro-Park Coalition	Jeon Ji-myung	4,514	6.6	new
Democratic Labor	Lee Joong-won	1,705	2.5	−2.6
Liberty Forward	Kim Hong-joon	1,512	2.2	new
Family Federation	Kim Jung-ho	450	0.7	new
Rejected ballots		298	–	–
Turnout		68,247	44.7	−16.5
Registered electors		152,770		
Democratic hold		Swing		

=== 2004 ===
Legislative Election 2004: Gwangjin B
Party	Candidate	Votes	%	±%
Uri	Kim Hyung-ju	31,963	35.7	new
Millennium Democratic	Choo Mi-ae	26,973	30.1	−27.3
Grand National	Yoo Joon-sang	26,108	29.1	−9.0
Democratic Labor	Lee Hae-sam	4,599	5.1	new
Rejected ballots		677	–	–
Turnout		90,320	61.2	+9.7
Registered electors		147,594		
Uri gain from Millennium Democratic		Swing		

=== 2000 ===
Legislative Election 2000: Gwangjin B
Party	Candidate	Votes	%	±%
Millennium Democratic	Choo Mi-ae	42,787	57.4	+13.6
Grand National	Yoo Joon-sang	28,418	38.1	+7.8
Youth Progressive	Lee Ja-young	3,401	4.6	new
Rejected ballots		784	–	–
Turnout		75,390	51.5	−8.5
Registered electors		146,498		
Millennium Democratic hold		Swing		

=== 1996 ===
Legislative Election 1996: Gwangjin B
Party	Candidate	Votes	%	±%
National Congress	Choo Mi-ae	36,570	43.8	new
New Korea	Kim Chung-geun	25,312	30.3	new
Democratic	Park Seok-mu	9,819	11.8	new
United Liberal Democrats	Kim Hee-ra	8,610	10.3	new
Independent	Kim Kwang-hae	1,672	2.0	new
Independent	Kwon Wal-soon	1,563	1.9	new
Rejected ballots		1,444	–	–
Turnout		84,990	60.0	–
Registered electors		141,598		
National Congress win (new seat)				

== See also ==
- List of constituencies of the National Assembly of South Korea
