= Lee Jin-sook (journalist) =

South Korean politician (born 1961)

- 이진숙
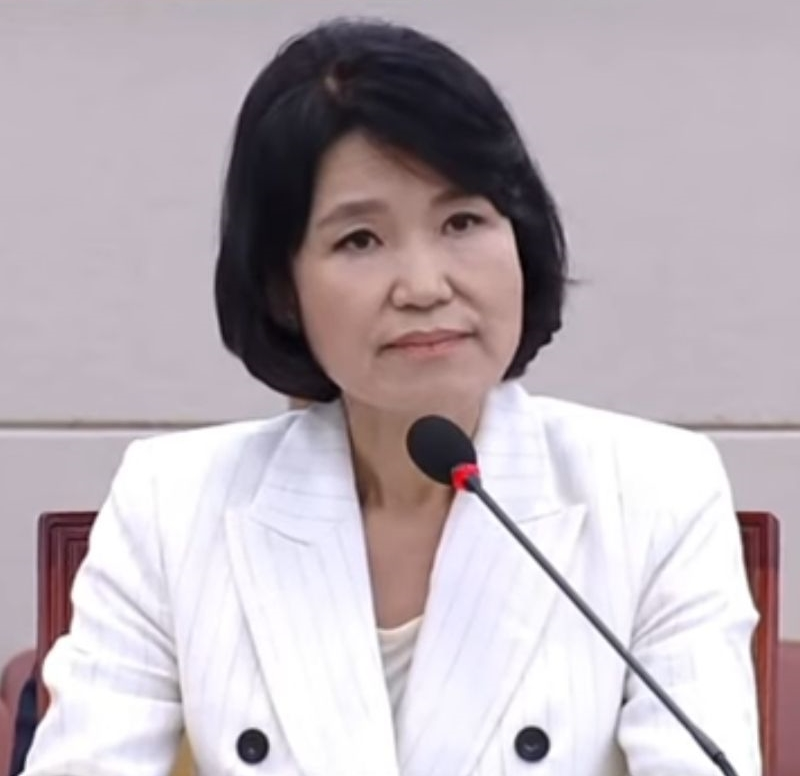

Member of the National Assembly
- Incumbent
- Assumed office June 4, 2026
- Preceded by: Choo Kyung-ho
- Constituency: Dalseong (Daegu)

Chairwoman of the Korea Communications Commission
- In office July 31, 2024 – September 30, 2025
- Preceded by: Kim Hong-il
- Succeeded by: Position abolished

Personal details
- Born: July 4, 1961 (age 65) Seongju County, North Gyeongsang Province, South Korea
- Education: Sogang University Graduate School of Journalism

Korean name
- Hangul: 이진숙
- Hanja: 李眞淑
- RR: I Jinsuk
- MR: I Chinsuk

Lee Jin-sook (Korean: 이진숙; born July 4, 1961) is a South Korean journalist and politician. She served as a reporter for Munhwa Broadcasting Corporation, head of the news department, and CEO of Daejeon Munhwa Broadcasting Corporation. She was the Chairwoman of the Korea Communications Commission under presidents of Yoon Suk Yeol and Lee Jae Myung until September 30, 2025, when the KCC was abolished.

Lee was appointed as the chairwoman of the Korea Communications Commission on July 31, 2024. She was the first Chairwoman to be impeached by the National Assembly on August 2, just two days after her appointment. She was suspended from her duties until the impeachment was dismissed on January 23, 2025 by the Constitutional Court of Korea.

On 2 October 2025, Lee was detained on charges of violating election laws and breaching political neutrality through her appearance on conservative YouTube channels in 2024. On 4 October, her petition for a judicial review was accepted, resulting in her release later that day.

She was elected to the National Assembly as the People Power Party candidate in the Dalseong County by-election, which was held concurrently with the 2026 South Korean local elections.

== Career ==
- 1986: Joined Munhwa Broadcasting Corporation News Department
- 2003–2006: Head of International Department, Munhwa Broadcasting Corporation News Department
- 2006–2009: Munhwa Broadcasting Corporation Washington correspondent
- 2009–2010: Head of International Department, Munhwa Broadcasting Corporation News Department
- 2010–2012: Director of Public Relations, Munhwa Broadcasting Corporation, Spokesperson
- 2012–2013: Director of Planning and Public Relations, Munhwa Broadcasting Corporation
- 2013–2014: Munhwa Broadcasting Corporation Washington Branch Manager
- 2014–2015: Head of News Department, Munhwa Broadcasting Corporation
- 2015–2018: President and CEO of Daejeon Cultural Broadcasting Corporation
- 2019: Joined People Power Party
- 2024: 11th Chairwoman of the Korea Communications Commission

== Election results ==
Year	Elections	Constituency	Political party	Votes (%)	Results
2026	2026 By-election	Dalseong (Daegu)	PPP	78,174 (59.06%)	Won
