= Cho Min academic credentials scandal =

2019 South Korean scandal

Cho Min (Korean: 조민, born 1991) is the daughter of the politician and former South Korean Minister of Justice Cho Kuk. She is currently a medical student at the Busan National University and is a researcher in genetics and pathology.

== Early years ==
Cho Min was born in Seoul, South Korea. Her father is Cho Kuk, a prominent politician; her mother is Chung Kyung-sim, a university professor. Her birth date registration was changed to September 1991 on the suggestion of her paternal grandfather in order to send her earlier to the school system. She was born to a wealthy family based in Busan, then the owners of Ungdong Foundation and Korea Construction Company.

== Research in genetics and other academic achievements ==
During her years in high school, she published eNos Gene Polymorphisms in Perinatal Hypoxic-Ischemic Encephalopathy in The Korean Journal of Pathology as the first author, meaning she did much of the research. She was also a co-author of Identification of Sex-specific genes in Aglaothamnion callophyllidicola (Rhodophyta) using differentially expressed gene analysis and she presented it at the 9th International Phycological Congress. These merits, along with numerous internships at prestigious institutions, helped her advance her career from a foreign language high school to Korea University's Life Sciences department, then to a Masters program at Seoul National University, and finally to the medical school of Busan National University.

== Cho Kuk scandal and the falsification of academic achievements of Cho Min ==
Beginning in late 2019, Cho Min's extraordinary academic achievements have come under scrutiny as her father, Cho Kuk, got involved in a serious scandal involving illegitimate business activities and falsifying Cho Min's academic achievements. On 27 August 2019, it was reported that 20 different locations, including Seoul National University, Busan University, Korea University, Dankook University, Kongju National University, Cho's brother-in-law's home, and other offices of his family businesses were raided by the prosecutor's office. Led by Yoon Suk-yeol, they were in search of evidence related to Cho's daughter's suspicious academic achievements, including a pathology paper, "eNos Gene Polymorphisms in Perinatal Hypoxic-Ischemic Encephalopathy". The paper was published in an international medical research journal, listing her as the primary author even though she was only a high school student. The medical paper was later retracted due to violations of ethical guidelines. A senior association of medical experts in South Korea condemned the paper as one of the most serious cases of academic misconduct in South Korean history and compared it to the Hwang Woo-suk scandal, which involved the fabrication of a series of experiments for publications in the field of stem cell research.

She later used this now retracted medical paper and other controversial extra-curricular experiences to enter Korea University and the Busan University medical school via a highly criticized admission path that does not require candidates to submit written college examination results. She is also under suspicion of receiving multiple scholarships normally reserved for financially challenged students. At the medical school, she flunked two semesters for substandard performance.

Cho's family members are currently under a travel ban. He and his family are under suspicion of inappropriate business practices, investments, and asset gains.

The aforementioned all preceded Cho's Minister of Justice nominee hearings, which took place on the 2nd and 3 September 2019. These controversies led to candlelight protests against Cho at both Seoul National University and Korea University on 23 August, where demands for his immediate resignation from the institution and his nomination were made. "Cho Kuk, you are an embarrassment," was one of this protest's campaign messages. "A survey of some 1,800 SNU students conducted by the online student community SNULife and released on 15 August, found that 95% of students said Cho was 'not fit for the justice minister position at all'". (University World News) On 28 August, a second candlelight protest was held at SNU, in which a total of 700 students participated.

On 4 September, Cho's wife, Chung Kyung-sim was officially announced as a defendant in allegations of acts of impropriety regarding an academic award claimed to have been awarded to her daughter, Cho Min, from Dongyang University. His wife's offices were put under search and seizure to obtain evidence. The President of Dongyang University, Choi Sung-hae, has denied ever awarding her such an award. Choi further added that, after leaving the prosecutor's office, as an educator, he cannot out of good conscience lie and, furthermore, the certificate number on the award in question (which appears to come with an official stamp from his office) is not in line with what his office officially utilises. The official award numbers start with "000"; the number on the allegedly fake certificate started with a "1". This indicates that there was fraud involved because the stamp itself seems similar to the official one. Most noteworthy is that this fake certificate, among other questionable awards in Cho's daughter's name, were used by Cho's family to apply for various top universities.

It was further reported that Cho's wife and other personal and political associates of Cho Kuk, including Rhyu Si-min, former Minister of Health and Welfare under Roh Moo-hyun Cabinet, placed a call to Choi and suggested that he say the certificate was authentic. Rhyu has admitted to the call but claims to have made the call as a YouTube reporter for information clarification.

On 10 September 2019, shortly after Cho Kuk's nomination hearing, Cho Kuk's wife, Chung Kyung-sim, was officially indicted for forgery of a document by the prosecutor's office. Prior to the charges and during the hearing, when asked what should happen if his wife should face charges, Cho Kuk replied that his wife should be held accountable to the fullest extent of the law. Cho Kuk did not add that he would withdraw or resign from the nomination.

On 24 October, Chung Kyung-sim was arrested for embezzlement using forged official documents and other charges.

In an interview with Kim Eo-jun, Cho Min denied all allegations against her, and showed support and worry for her indicted mother. On the possibility of retraction of all her academic credentials in tertiary education, she expressed that it would be unfair, but she also expressed her determination to become a medical doctor even if it takes her another ten years.

In an inquiry by the South Korean parliament, it was found that Cho Min's name is engraved in a memorial in the Korea Institute of Science and Technology (KIST) for her contribution to the institute. Her contribution, which is known to be her brief internship in the institute, came into question as to whether she properly participated in the internship program. A research director in KIST was sacked for his role in falsifying documents related to Cho Min's internship. KIST announced it will launch a full investigation of all individuals honored in the memorial, and remove any names who did not meet a preset standard. On December 31, 2019, KIST announced it will remove the names of all workers who quit within a month without pay. Cho Min was contracted to work at KIST as a student researcher for a month and received a work certificate. However, in a subsequent investigation, it was found that she only worked for two days. Based on this criterion, 23 names will be removed from the KIST memorial, including Cho Min.

== See also ==
- Chung Yoo-ra
