= Wi Seong-gon =

South Korean politician (born 1968)

- 위성곤
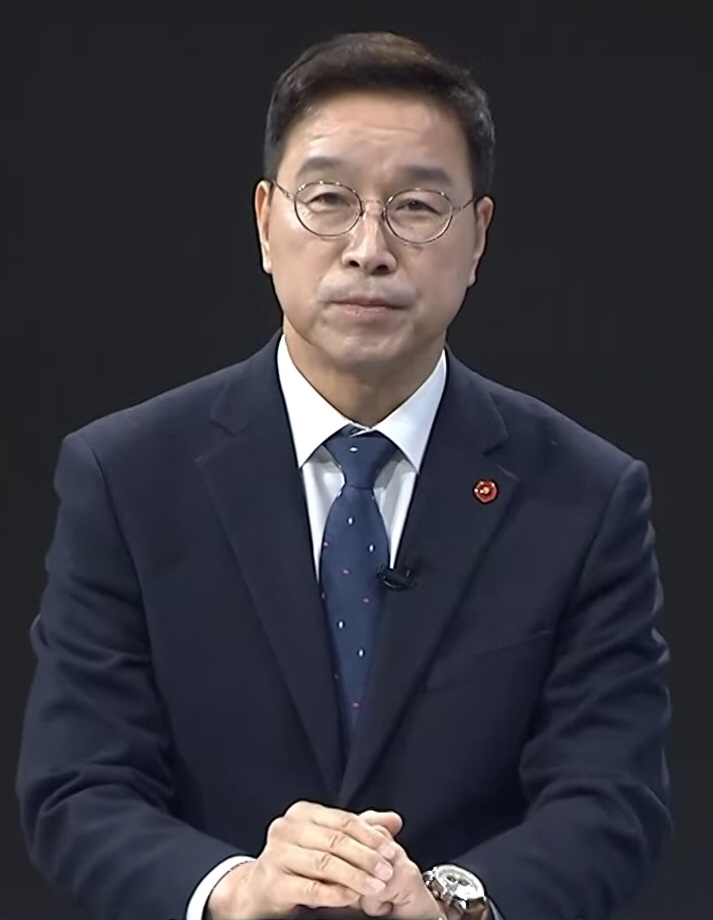
- Wi in 2023

Governor of Jeju Province
- Incumbent
- Assumed office 1 July 2026
- Preceded by: Oh Young-hun

Member of the National Assembly
- In office 30 May 2016 – 29 April 2026
- Constituency: Seogwipo (Jeju)

Personal details
- Born: 20 January 1968 (age 58) Jangheung County, South Jeolla Province, South Korea
- Party: Democratic
- Education: Jeju National University
- Religion: Roman Catholic (Christian name : Thomas Aquinas)

Korean name
- Hangul: 위성곤
- Hanja: 魏聖坤
- RR: Wi Seonggon
- MR: Wi Sŏnggon

Wi Seong-gon (Korean: 위성곤; born 20 January 1968) is a South Korean politician who has served as the governor of Jeju Province since 2026. A member of the Democratic Party of Korea (DPK), he has served as a member of the National Assembly since 2016.

== Early life and career ==
Wi Seong-gon was born on 20 January 1968 in Jangheung County, South Jeolla Province. When he was 8 years old, he moved to Seogwipo, Jeju Province with his parents. He graduated from Jeju National University.

== Political career ==
Wi served as a member of the Jeju Provincial Council from 2006 to 2015.

In 2016, he was nominated by the Democratic Party in the legislative election and was elected in Seogwipo, Jeju Province.

In the 2026 South Korean local elections, Wi was elected as Governor of Jeju Province, defeating People Power Party nominee Moon Seongyu by a wide margin.

== Election results ==
=== General elections ===
| Year | Elections | Constituency | Political party | Votes (%) | Results |
|---|---|---|---|---|---|
| 2016 | 20th National Assembly General Election | Seogwipo (Jeju) | Democratic | 42,719 (53.52%) | Won |
| 2020 | 21st National Assembly General Election | Seogwipo (Jeju) | Democratic | 53,345 (55.48%) | Won |
| 2024 | 22nd National Assembly General Election | Seogwipo (Jeju) | Democratic | 53,831 (54.00%) | Won |

=== Local elections ===
==== Governor of Jeju ====
| Year | Elections | Constituency | Political party | Votes (%) | Remarks |
|---|---|---|---|---|---|
| 2026 | 9th Iocal Election | Jeju (Governoral Elections) | Democratic | 197,897 (63.11%) | Won |

==== Jeju Special Self-Governing Provincial Council ====
| Year | Elections | Constituency | Political party | Votes (%) | Remarks |
|---|---|---|---|---|---|
| 2006 | 4th Iocal Election | Jeju 22nd | Uri | 3,282 (39.11%) | Won |
| 2010 | 5th Iocal Election | Jeju 22nd | Democratic | 6,222 (66.14%) | Won |
| 2014 | 6th Iocal Election | Jeju 22nd | NPAD | 6,197 (66.44%) | Won |
