= Seogwipo (constituency) =

South Korean parliamentary constituency

- Single-member constituency for the National Assembly
- Location of the constituency
- District(s): Seogwipo
- Region: Jeju Province
- Electorate: 142,708 (2017)

Current constituency
- Created: 2008
- Seats: 1
- Party: Democratic Party
- Member: Kim Sung-bum
- Council constituency: 20th district 21st district 22nd district 23rd district 24th district 25th district 26th district 27th district 28th district 29th district
- Created from: Seogwipo–Namjeju

Seogwipo (Korean: 서귀포시) is a constituency of the National Assembly of South Korea. The constituency consists of Seogwipo. As of 2024, 155,750 eligible voters were registered in the constituency.

== List of members of the National Assembly ==
| Election | Member | Party | Dates | Notes |
|---|---|---|---|---|
| 2008 | Kim Jae-yun | United Democratic | 2008–2015 | |
| 2012 | Kim Jae-yun | Democratic United | 2008–2015 | |
| 2016 | Wi Seong-gon | Democratic | 2016-2026 | Resigned on 29 April 2026 to run for Governor of Jeju Province; Governor of Jeju Province (2026–) |
| 2020 | Wi Seong-gon | Democratic | 2016-2026 | Resigned on 29 April 2026 to run for Governor of Jeju Province; Governor of Jeju Province (2026–) |
| 2024 | Wi Seong-gon | Democratic | 2016-2026 | Resigned on 29 April 2026 to run for Governor of Jeju Province; Governor of Jeju Province (2026–) |
| 2026 | Kim Sung-bum | Democratic | 2026-present | Deputy Minister of Oceans and Fisheries (2025–2026); Acting Minister of Oceans and Fisheries (2025–2026) |

== Election results ==
=== 2024 ===
Legislative Election 2024: Seogwipo
| Party | Candidate | Votes | % | ±% |
|---|---|---|---|---|
| Democratic | Wi Seong-gon | 53,831 | 54.00 | ▼1.48 |
| People Power | Ko Ki-cheol | 45,841 | 46.00 | ▲2.64 |
| Rejected ballots | | 1,235 | – | |
| Turnout | | 100,906 | 64.78 | ▲0.9 |
| Registered electors | | 155,750 | | |
| Democratic hold | | Swing | | |

=== 2020 ===
Legislative Election 2020: Seogwipo
| Party | Candidate | Votes | % | ±% |
|---|---|---|---|---|
| Democratic | Wi Seong-gon | 53,545 | 55.48 | ▲1.06 |
| United Future | Kang Kyung-pil | 41,689 | 43.36 | ▼3.01 |
| National Revolutionary | Moon Kwang-sam | 1,109 | 1.15 | new |
| Rejected ballots | | 1,387 | – | |
| Turnout | | 97,530 | 63.88 | ▲4.09 |
| Registered electors | | 152,676 | | |
| Democratic hold | | Swing | | |

=== 2016 ===
Legislative Election 2016: Seogwipo
| Party | Candidate | Votes | % | ±% |
|---|---|---|---|---|
| Democratic | Wi Seong-gon | 42,719 | 53.5 | +16.4 |
| Saenuri | Kang Ji-yong | 37,097 | 46.5 | +15.3 |
| Rejected ballots | | 1,369 | – | – |
| Turnout | | 81,185 | 59.8 | −1.0 |
| Registered electors | | 135,767 | | |
| Democratic hold | | Swing | | |

=== 2012 ===
Legislative Election 2012: Seogwipo
| Party | Candidate | Votes | % | ±% |
|---|---|---|---|---|
| Democratic United | Kim Jae-yun | 26,992 | 37.1 | −6.4 |
| Independent | Moon Dae-rim | 23,025 | 31.7 | new |
| Saenuri | Kang Ji-yong | 22,728 | 31.2 | −8.5 |
| Rejected ballots | | 858 | – | – |
| Turnout | | 73,603 | 60.8 | +3.8 |
| Registered electors | | 121,095 | | |
| Democratic United hold | | Swing | | |

=== 2008 ===
Legislative Election 2008: Seogwipo
| Party | Candidate | Votes | % | ±% |
|---|---|---|---|---|
| United Democratic | Kim Jae-yun | 28,855 | 43.5 | new |
| Grand National | Kang Sang-ju | 26,333 | 39.7 | new |
| Democratic Labor | Hyun Ae-ja | 7,649 | 11.5 | new |
| Liberty Forward | Oh Young-sam | 2,588 | 3.9 | new |
| Family Federation | Shin Myung-soo | 863 | 1.3 | new |
| Rejected ballots | | 532 | – | – |
| Turnout | | 66,820 | 57.0 | |
| Registered electors | | 117,236 | | |
| United Democratic win (new seat) | | | | |

== See also ==
- List of constituencies of the National Assembly of South Korea
