= Ko Min-jung =

South Korean politician (born 1979)

- 고민정
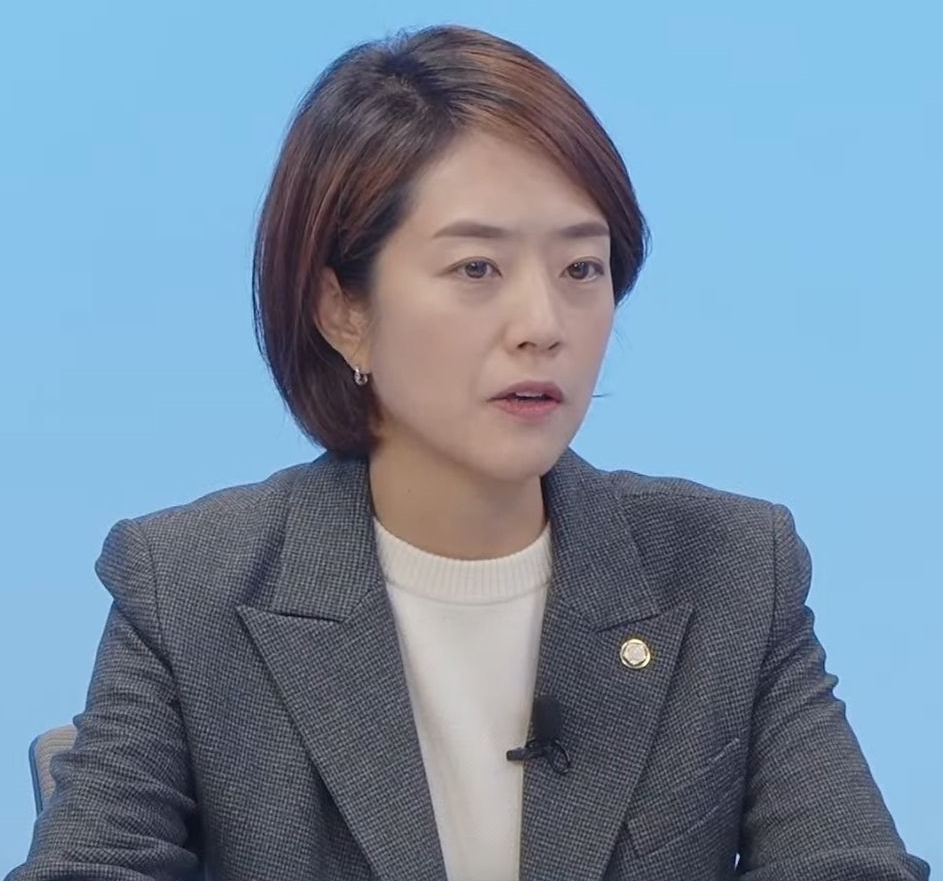

Presidential Spokesperson
- In office 25 April 2019 – 15 January 2020
- President: Moon Jae-in
- Preceded by: Park Soo-hyun; Kim Eui-kyeom
- Succeeded by: Kang Min-seok

Vice Presidential Spokesperson
- In office 18 May 2017 – 24 April 2019
- President: Moon Jae-in
- Succeeded by: Han Jung-woo

Member of the National Assembly
- Incumbent
- Assumed office 30 May 2020
- Preceded by: Choo Mi-ae
- Constituency: Seoul Gwangjin B

Personal details
- Born: 13 October 1979 (age 47) Seoul, South Korea
- Party: Democratic
- Spouse: Cho Ki Young
- Education: Kyung Hee University; Qingdao University

Korean name
- Hangul: 고민정
- RR: Go Minjeong
- MR: Ko Minjŏng

Ko Min-jung (Korean: 고민정; born October 13, 1979) is South Korean politician and former KBS announcer. She served as the presidential spokesperson at the Blue House under President Moon Jae-in and is currently a National Assembly member from Seoul.

In 2004, she passed an exam and joined the Announcers' Bureau of the Programming Department at KBS. From 2005 to 2017, she hosted various informative, family-oriented TV shows and two radio programmes.

In 2017, she left a high-paying job at a national broadcaster to serve as spokesperson for Moon during his campaign for the Democratic Party primary and 2017 presidential elections. Following Moon's inauguration as President, she became his first vice presidential spokesperson. In April 2019, she was promoted to presidential spokesperson after her predecessor resigned. She resigned from the position in January 2020 in preparation for the 2020 general election.

In the 2020 general election, Ko defeated former Seoul mayor Oh Se-hoon, a potential presidential candidate for the opposition party. In 2021, she served as a spokesperson for Park Young-sun, her party's candidate for Seoul mayor in the 2021 South Korean by-elections, where Oh was nominated by the main opposition party.

She holds a Bachelor's and Master's degree in Chinese language and literature from Kyung Hee University and Qingdao University.

== Electoral history ==
| Election | Year | District | Party affiliation | Votes | Percentage of votes | Results |
|---|---|---|---|---|---|---|
| 21st National Assembly General Election | 2020 | Seoul Gwangjin B | Democratic Party | 54,210 | 50.37% | Won |
| 22nd National Assembly General Election | 2024 | Seoul Gwangjin B | Democratic Party | 53,362 | 51.47% | Won |

== Personal life ==
She is married to poet Cho Ki-young, whom she met at Kyunghee University.
