= 2026 South Korean by-elections =

The 2026 South Korean by-elections (Korean: 2026년 대한민국 재보궐선거) were held in South Korea on 3 June 2026, alongside the 2026 South Korean local elections.

The by-elections were called due to the vacancies of 14 constituencies in the National Assembly, making the by-elections the most large-scale ones since democratisation and thus considered politically significant. Thirteen of the vacated seats were previously held by members of the Democratic Party. One of the seats was vacated by President Lee Jae Myung's resignation from the National Assembly due to his victory in the 2025 South Korean presidential election. Several seats were declared vacant by court orders due to campaign finance violations committed by previously elected MPs. Other MPs, including Min Hyung-bae and Choo Kyung-ho, resigned in order to run in the local elections.

The outcome of the by-elections did not influence the power balance of the national assembly, as the ruling Democratic Party currently holds a slim majority.

== Candidates ==
Notable candidates include Cho Kuk, Han Dong-hoon, Song Young-gil, and Lee Kwang-jae. In case they win their respective races, they are considered potential candidates for the 2030 South Korean presidential election.

== Districts ==
13 parliamentary seats are former Democratic Party seats, and the only 1 seat is former People Power Party seat. 14 seats will be elected on the 3rd of June, 2026. 5 seats are located in the Seoul metropolitan area, while the rest of seats are in other areas.

- Gyeonggi Ansan A
- Gyeonggi Hanam A
- Gyeonggi Pyeongtaek B
- Incheon Gyeyang B
- Incheon Yeonsu A
- Jeju Seogwipo
- Busan Buk A
- Gwangju Gwangsan B
- Chungnam Gongju·Buyeo·Cheongyang
- Chungnam Asan B
- Jeonbuk Gunsan·Gimje·Buan A
- Jeonbuk Gunsan·Gimje·Buan B
- Ulsan Nam A
- Daegu Dalseong
