= Kim Suk-won (entrepreneur) =

South Korean businessman and politician (1945–2023)

- Born: 22 April 1945; Keishōhoku Province, Korea, Empire of Japan
- Died: 26 August 2023 (aged 78); Seoul, South Korea
- Occupation(s): Businessman, politician
- Known for: Chair of Ssangyong Business Group; President of the Boy Scouts of Korea

Korean name
- Hangul: 김석원
- Hanja: 金錫元
- RR: Gim Seokwon
- MR: Kim Sŏgwŏn

Art name
- Hangul: 창제
- Hanja: 倉齊
- RR: Changje
- MR: Ch'angje

Kim Suk-won (Korean: 김석원; 22 April 1945 – 26 August 2023) was a South Korean businessman and politician. He was the chair of Ssangyong Business Group, one of the largest companies in South Korea. Kim served as the president of the Boy Scouts of Korea, a member of the World Scout Committee, and vice-chairman of the World Scout Foundation.

In 1995, Kim was awarded the 241st Bronze Wolf by the World Scout Committee, for exceptional services to the world Scout movement.

Kim Suk-won died on 26 August 2023, at the age of 78.
