= Cho Kuk =

South Korean politician (born 1965)

- 조국
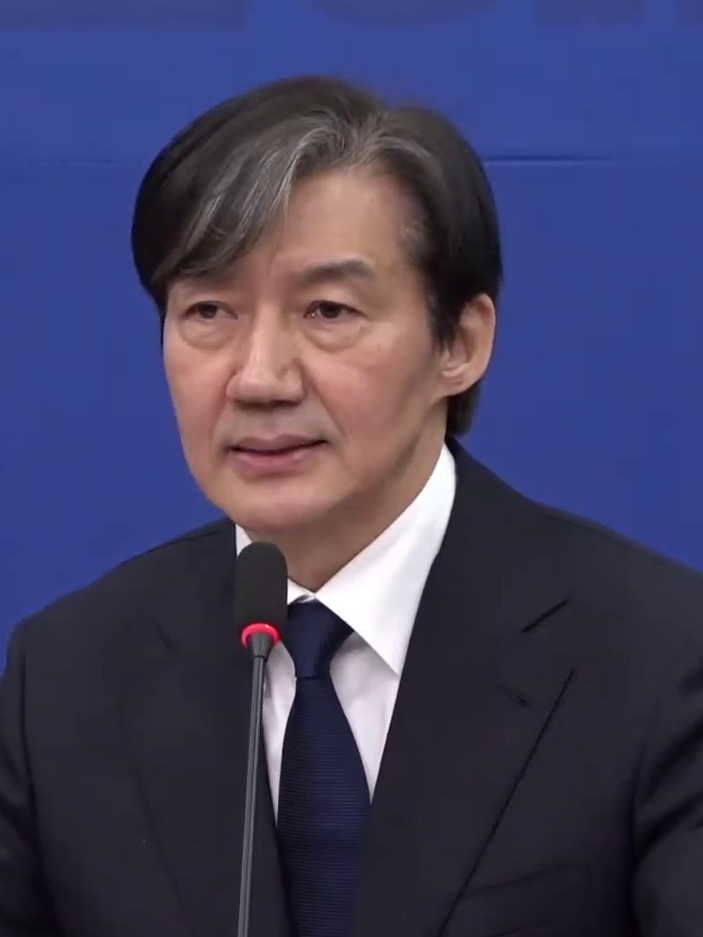
- Cho in 2024

Leader of the Rebuilding Korea Party
- In office 8 September 2025 (Note: Acting: 8 September 2025 – 23 November 2025) – 4 June 2026
- Preceded by: Kim Sunmin (acting)
- Succeeded by: Shin Jang-sik
- In office 3 March 2024 – 12 December 2024
- Preceded by: Office established
- Succeeded by: Kim Sunmin (acting)

Member of the National Assembly
- In office 30 May 2024 – 12 December 2024
- Constituency: Proportional representation

Minister of Justice
- In office 9 September 2019 – 14 October 2019
- President: Moon Jae-in
- Preceded by: Park Sang-ki
- Succeeded by: Kim Oh-soo (acting); Choo Mi-ae

Senior Presidential Secretary for Civil Affairs
- In office 11 May 2017 – 26 July 2019
- President: Moon Jae-in
- Preceded by: Cho Dae-hwan
- Succeeded by: Kim Joe-won

Personal details
- Born: 6 April 1965 (age 61) Seo District, Busan, South Korea
- Party: Rebuilding Korea (2024, 2025-present)
- Other political affiliations: New Politics Alliance for Democracy (2014–2015); Democratic Party of Korea (2015–2023); Independent (Note: Lost party membership due to criminal conviction and loss of voting and election rights) (2024-2025)
- Spouse: Chung Kyung-shim
- Children: 2, including Cho Min
- Education: Seoul National University (LLB, LLM); University of California, Berkeley (JSD)
- Occupation: Politician; activist; jurist

Korean name
- Hangul: 조국
- Hanja: 曺國
- RR: Jo Guk
- MR: Cho Kuk

Cho Kuk (Korean: 조국; born 6 April 1965) is a South Korean politician who served as the leader of the Rebuilding Korea Party in 2024 and from 2025 to 2026. He previously held office as the senior secretary to the president for civil affairs from 2017 to 2019, as the minister of justice from September to October 2019, and as a member of the National Assembly of South Korea from May to December 2024.

Born in Seo District, Busan, Cho graduated from the University of California, Berkeley with a Doctor of Juridical Science before becoming a professor at Seoul National University School of Law. Beyond academia, he was active in a range of civic and advocacy organizations concerned with human rights, such as the People's Solidarity for Participatory Democracy and the National Human Rights Commission of Korea. He entered politics as a senior presidential aide for civil affairs under the cabinet of Moon Jae-in from May 2017 to July 2019. Cho was subsequently appointed Minister of Justice, a position he held from September 2019 until his resignation on 14 October 2019 due to his involvement in a series of controversies, including allegations of corruption surrounding his family's business activities.

In 2023, Cho was convicted of falsifying documents in connection with his children's college admissions and sentenced to two years in prison. In March 2024, he founded the Rebuilding Korea Party ahead of the 2024 South Korean legislative election. In December 2024, the South Korea Supreme Court upheld the lower courts' ruling, effectively disqualifying him from his seat in the 22nd National Assembly of South Korea and barring him from running for office for five years. As a result, he lost his seat in the National Assembly and was barred from running for public office for five years under South Korean law.

He was pardoned by President Lee Jae Myung on 11 August 2025, restoring his eligibility to run for office again. Following his release from prison, the Rebuilding Korea Party reinstated his membership. Cho was elected as the party's leader in November 2025 with 98.6% approval. Following his loss in the Pyeongtaek-B constituency in Gyeonggi during the 2026 South Korean local elections, Cho announced his resignation as party leader.

== Early life and education ==
Cho was born in Seo District, Busan, South Korea in 1965, as the eldest son of the ex-Director of Ungdong Middle School Cho Byun-hyun (died in 2013), and his wife and the current Director of the institute, Park Jung-sook.

He attended Gudeok Elementary School in Busan, then moved to Seoul and studied at Daesin Middle School. After he returned to Busan, he finished his secondary education at Hyekwang High School. Cho earned bachelor's and master's degrees in law from Seoul National University, and a doctoral degree (J.S.D) from the University of California, Berkeley, in the United States. He was also a visiting scholar at the University of Oxford and University of Leeds in the United Kingdom.

== Career ==
=== Early career ===
Cho was previously a lecturer in law at the University of Ulsan from 1992 to 1994 and from 1999 to 2000, then at Dongguk University from 2000 to 2001, and later at Seoul National University—where he had earned his bachelor's degree—from 2001 to 2004. While at Seoul National University, he was promoted from lecturer to senior lecturer (2004–2009), then to full professor in 2009.

=== Political career ===
Cho showed interest in politics at the end of the 1980s, while studying at university. During this time, he was already a member of the South Korean Socialist Workers' Alliance, along with Rhyu Si-min and Eun Soo-mi. Cho was detained due to his activities, under breach of the National Security Act, and declared a prisoner of conscience by Amnesty International. Later, he criticised the National Security Act as a "barbaric law" in his book titled For the Freedom of Conscience and Ideology.

Since the 2000s, Cho has been involved in various activities related to human rights and democracy. He was a member of the People's Solidarity for Participatory Democracy, Committee of Determination of Punishment in Supreme Court, National Human Rights Commission, and the other various organisations.

Cho has never held any elected position, even though the former Democratic Party (2008) and its successor Democratic Unionist Party suggested that he run for a position as member of the National Assembly in Bundang 2nd constituency. There were also expectations that Cho would run for Superintendent of Education in Seoul during the local elections in 2014, but he declined. He did not run for mayorship of Busan in 2018, despite public expectations.

==== Senior Secretary to the President for Civil Affairs (2017–2019) ====
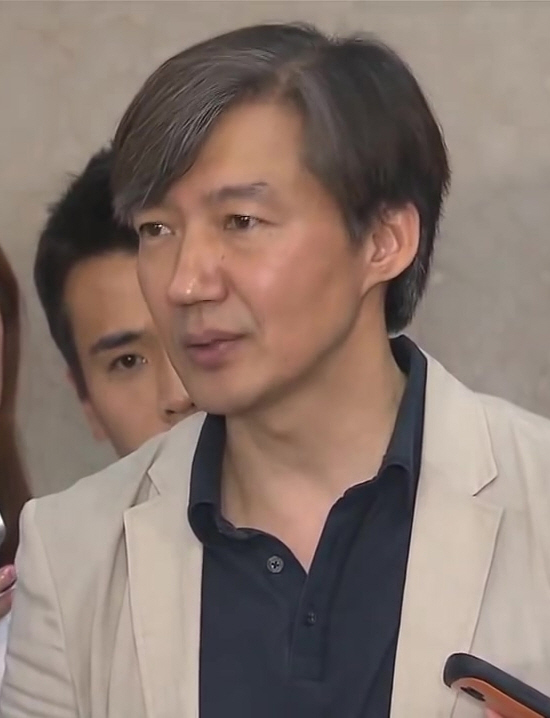
Cho Kuk in 2015

On 11 May 2017, the day after Moon Jae-in officially assumed the office of president, Cho was appointed Senior Secretary to the President for Civil Affairs. He was one of several non-prosecutors appointed to the position. He promised a clear investigation of the 2016 South Korean political scandal. This was welcomed by the People's Party, but also attacked by the Liberty Korea Party.

On 31 December 2018, Cho attended the House Steering Committee of the National Assembly. This "surprise" attendance was an issue in South Korean society, as such was not really done by former senior secretaries. A source reported that this negatively affected the approval ratings of President Moon.

Cho was replaced by Kim Joe-won on 26 July 2019.

==== Minister of Justice (2019) ====
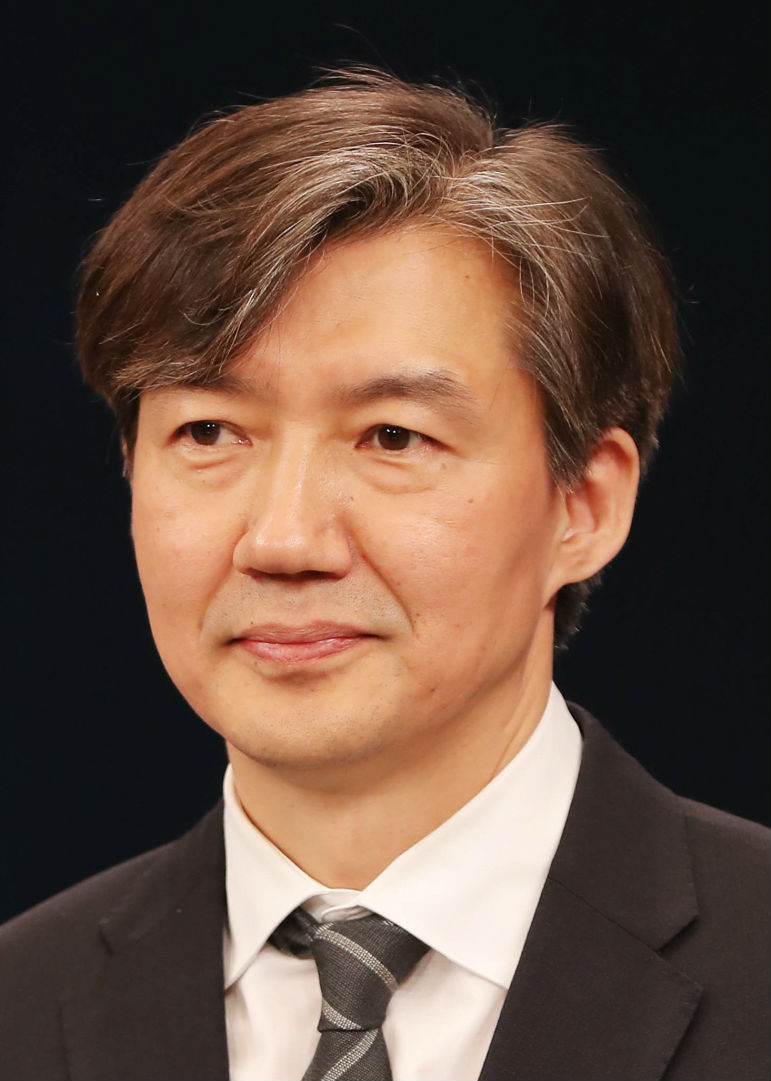
Cho Kuk in 2017

On 9 August 2019, Cho was nominated for the position of Minister of Justice replacing Park Sang-ki, by President Moon. He quoted General Yi Sun-sin and promised political reform. On 9 September, Cho was officially appointed Minister of Justice. Cho subsequently resigned on 14 October, just 35 days after taking office due to a prosecution probe into various allegations surrounding his family.

== Political positions ==
Cho is often regarded as liberal, or a left-wing politician. Regarding the abolition of the death penalty, he said, "I understood the national sentiment, but it should be replaced with life imprisonment." He also mentioned that people should not argue with the criminality of abortion.

For issues related to the Korean Confederation of Trade Unions (KCTU), Cho announced that the government is not only for KCTU and impossible to satisfy their demands.

Cho also claims that the government should induce major companies to lower their salary, to enforce equality between workers in major businesses and workers in smaller businesses.

Cho called the declaration of martial law by President Yoon Suk Yeol on 3 December 2024 "illegal" and said it met conditions for the impeachment of Yoon and Kim Yong-hyun, the minister of national defense.

== Controversies ==
=== Plagiarism ===
Leaders of Seoul National University's General Student Council chant slogans during a rally at the school campus in Seoul on 5 September 2019, to voice their objection to the possible appointment of Cho Kuk, who is facing allegations of ethical lapses.

Cho was frequently accused of plagiarism. In July 2013, Song Pyung-in of The Dong-A Ilbo and a conservative commentator Byun Hee-jae had mentioned that Cho plagiarized several theses written by Japanese scholars during his studies at Seoul National University in 1989. He replied that he underwent some problems with citations, although "unsure because it was long time ago", but then he apologized for it.

On 26 June 2015, Seoul National University issued a statement that some issues with his papers were found, though they were not serious. A few months after the incident, both commentators claimed again that Cho's plagiarism continued at University of California, Berkeley in 1997. In response, Professor John Yoo said that no rechecking is required. Berkeley also mentioned that there was no proof for the accusations.

=== Tax delinquencies ===
Cho faced another criticisms regarding tax delinquencies related to the Ungdong Institute. It was reported that he and his family did not pay legal costs for 3 years. He accepted that this was true, and made all necessary payments.

=== Allegations of illicit business activities ===
In 2017, it was revealed that Cho Kuk and his family invested a total of approximately ₩1.4 billion, with a contract to invest an additional approximately ₩7 billion into a private equity fund, CO-LINK. CO-LINK invested in a Korean company that is contracted in a multi-billion dollar computer network project in South Korea.

On 27 August 2019, a search warrant was carried out by the prosecutor's office on suspect sites. On 29 August, the former wife of Cho's younger brother Cho Kwon, Cho Eun-hyang, who is listed as the owner or CEO of many of Cho Kuk's family businesses and properties, was denied boarding on an international flight out of Gimhae International Airport. Despite two full days of news reports, she claimed she was not aware of the flight ban placed on her. Furthermore, three other business associates of Cho Kuk's family, including a Cho Kuk relative, had already left the country before the ban was officially placed on them.

Kim Gyung-yul and his team of accountants and economic analysts of People's Solidarity for Participatory Democracy came to a conclusion that this is a crime involving political power.

On 31 October 2019, Cho Kuk's younger brother, Cho Kwon, was arrested on charges of embezzlement and bribery. These charges were later dropped.

=== Falsification of academic achievements of Cho Min ===
A scandals came from his pending nomination as the Minister of Justice, mainly concerning Cho Kuk's falsification of academic achievements of his daughter, Cho Min.

Cho Min, and her parents Cho Kuk and Chung Kyung-sim, have been accused of falsifying her academic achievements to gain admission into prestigious universities and the medical school. Falsified academic achievements include her research in genetics and pathology, one which has since been retracted for violation of ethical guidelines. A senior association of medical experts in South Korea condemned the paper as one of the most serious cases of academic misconduct in South Korean history and compared it to the Hwang Woo-suk scandal.

On 31 December 2019, Cho was indicted on 12 charges over his role in his children's college admissions, including for bribery and corruption, but was not detained. In January 2020, Cho was removed from his teaching position at Seoul National University. In February 2023, Cho was sentenced to two years prison for falsely submitting documents attesting that his son had completed an internship and forging his daughter's academic credentials. In June 2023, Seoul National University expelled him from their faculty of law.

On 12 December 2024, Cho's conviction was upheld by the Supreme Court of Korea, paving the way for his losing his seat in the National Assembly and his eligibility to run in presidential elections until 2029. Cho reported to prison on 16 December, after he successfully requested prosecutors to allow him to address official duties and the succession of Rebuilding Korea's leadership.

=== Arrest of Chung Kyung-sim ===
On 10 September 2019, shortly after Cho Kuk's nomination hearing, his wife, Chung Kyung-sim, was officially indicted for forgery of a document by the prosecutor's office. When asked what should happen should his wife face charges, Cho replied that she should be held accountable to the fullest extent of the law. He did not add that he would withdraw or resign from the nomination.

On 24 October Chung Kyung-sim was charged on 15 counts, including obstruction of business, insider trading, embezzlement, and withholding evidence. On 23 December 2020, she was found guilty on 11 charges, and sentenced to four years in prison and a total of ₩638 million (equivalent to around $500,000 US) in fines and "unlawful gains". The embezzlement charges were dismissed. The sentence was upheld by the supreme court on 27 January 2022.

== Pardon ==
Cho and his wife were pardoned by President Lee Jae Myung on 11 August 2025, restoring his eligibility to run for office again. He left prison at midnight on 15 August 2025, on Liberation Day. His membership in the Rebuilding Korea, which was revoked following his conviction, was restored by party's supreme council on 21 August, and he was appointed to head the party's policy think tank.

Cho was elected as the party's leader in November 2025 with 98.6% approval. In his acceptance speech, he pledged to push for legislation on the relocation of the administrative capital, normalization of property taxes, and regulations against Jeonse fraud.

== Bibliography ==
- Sex-biased Criminal Codes (1 March 2001)
- For the Freedom of Conscience and Ideology (30 August 2001)
- Prostitution (1 February 2004)
- Hearsay Rule of Illegally Acquired Evidences (20 March 2005)
- Plea-bargaining – Introduction Planning and Studies (2006)
- Introspecting Liberals (24 March 2008)
- Hymn of Bonobo (How to survive as human in jungle-capitalist Korea?) (11 May 2009)
- We're Telling You, South Korea – Our Homelands (3 January 2011)
- Why am I studying law? (15 June 2014)
- Criminal Law for Self-control (25 December 2014)

== Electoral results ==
Year	Elections	Constituency	Political party	Votes (%)	Remarks
2024	22nd National Assembly General Election	PR (2nd)	Rebuilding Korea Party	6,874,278 (24.25%)	Elected
2026	2026 By-election	Pyeongtaek B (Gyeonggi)	Rebuilding Korea Party	26,233 (27.24%)	Defeated (3rd)

== Notes ==
Political offices
Preceded by Park Sang-ki	Minister of Justice; 2019–2020	Succeeded by Kim Oh-soo (acting); Choo Mi-ae
Preceded by Cho Dae-hwan	Senior Secretary to the President for Civil Affairs; 2017–2019	Succeeded by Kim Joe-won
