= Park Sang-ki =

South Korean educator, jurist, prosecutor and politician

- 박상기
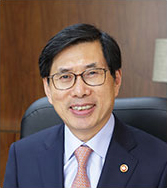

Minister of Justice
- In office 19 July 2017 – 8 September 2019
- President: Moon Jae-in
- Preceded by: Kim Hyun-woong
- Succeeded by: Cho Kuk

Personal details
- Born: 1952 (age 73–74) Muan, South Jeolla, South Korea
- Party: Independent
- Children: 1 son
- Education: Yonsei University; University of Göttingen
- Occupation: Educator; jurist; prosecutor; politician

Park Sang-ki (Korean: 박상기; born 1952) is a South Korean educator, jurist, prosecutor and politician who has served as the Minister of Justice from May 2017 to September 2019 under the cabinet of Moon Jae-in.

== Biography ==
Born in 1952 at Muan County, South Korea Park attended the University of Göttingen. He used to be a both lecturer and professor at Yonsei University. He is also a member of Citizens' Coalition for Economic Justice (CCEJ) and used to be one of its Co-Presidents from February to June 2017. He was also the ex-Director of Dongduk Women's University from 2004 to 2007.

Park formerly worked at Supreme Prosecutors' Office from 1998 to 2005, and also at Ministry of Justice from 2004 to 2011. He seeks to reform prosecution.

On 27 June 2017, Park was designated as Minister of Justice, after the resignation of Ahn Kyung-hwan. He was officially appointed on 19 July and assumed the office. During this time, he faced several controversies, including receiving the treat, bitcoin crisis, and suppression of trade union. He was replaced by Cho Kuk on 9 September 2019.

His son is a lawyer.
