= People's Solidarity for Participatory Democracy =

South Korean non-governmental organization

- Formation: 10 September 1994
- Headquarters: Jongno District, Seoul, South Korea
- Location: South Korea
- Members: 13,000 members
- General Secretary: Tae-Ho Lee
- Co-representatives: Prof. Kyun Kim; Prof. Hyun-Back Chung; Ven. Chunghwa; Att. Suk-Tae Lee (November 8, 2012-present)
- Staff: approx. 50 coordinators
- Website: www.peoplepower21.org

Korean name
- Hangul: 참여연대
- Hanja: 參與連帶
- RR: Chamyeo yeondae
- MR: Ch'amyŏ yŏndae

People's Solidarity for Participatory Democracy (PSPD; Korean: 참여연대) is a South Korean non-governmental organization that was established on 10 September 1994 with around 200 members.

In 2004, PSPD obtained a special consultative status with the UN ECOSOC and started advocating before various UN bodies including the UN human rights council.

As of July 2012, around 13,000 individuals are members of PSPD. It has ten departments and three auxiliaries.
