= Jangheung County =

Coordinates: 34°41′04″N 126°54′27″E

Jangheung
- County
- Panoramic view of Jangheung-eup

- Flag Emblem of Jangheung

- Location in South Korea
- Country: South Korea
- Region: Honam
- Provincial-level city: Jeonnam-Gwangju
- Administrative divisions: 3 eup, 7 myeon

Area
  - Total: 617.96 km^{2} (238.60 sq mi)

Population (September 2024)
  - Total: 34,544
  - Density: 86/km^{2} (220/sq mi)
  - Dialect: Jeolla

Korean name
- Hangul: 장흥군
- Hanja: 長興郡
- RR: Jangheung-gun
- MR: Changhŭng-gun

Jangheung County (Korean: 장흥군) is a county in Jeonnam-Gwangju, South Korea.

== Slow city ==
In 2007 Jangheung was designated as a slow city. It was the first slow city designation in Asia.

== Spot for filming ==
Festival (1996) was filmed in Jangheung county by director Im Kwon-taek.

== Eulalia ==
Jangheung's Cheonkwan Mt. is known for its scenery and eulalias. These plants reach full height around mid-September and until October.

== Symbols ==
- Bird : Dove
- Flower : Azalea
- Tree : Camellia

== Special products ==
The county is known for its production of Shiitake mushrooms.

Eco-friendly cultivation methods are used county-wide to raise crops used in Korean medicine. Jangheung county received an official award in 2006 for growing high-quality crops.

== Climate ==
Climate data for Jangheung (1991–2020 normals, extremes 1972–present)
Month	Jan	Feb	Mar	Apr	May	Jun	Jul	Aug	Sep	Oct	Nov	Dec	Year
Record high °C (°F)	19.6 (67.3)	23.3 (73.9)	24.6 (76.3)	28.3 (82.9)	33.5 (92.3)	34.3 (93.7)	38.7 (101.7)	38.3 (100.9)	34.8 (94.6)	30.5 (86.9)	26.5 (79.7)	20.3 (68.5)	38.7 (101.7)
Mean daily maximum °C (°F)	6.5 (43.7)	8.8 (47.8)	13.4 (56.1)	19.0 (66.2)	23.6 (74.5)	26.2 (79.2)	28.9 (84.0)	30.0 (86.0)	26.9 (80.4)	22.2 (72.0)	15.5 (59.9)	8.8 (47.8)	19.2 (66.6)
Daily mean °C (°F)	1.0 (33.8)	2.6 (36.7)	6.8 (44.2)	12.2 (54.0)	17.3 (63.1)	21.4 (70.5)	24.9 (76.8)	25.6 (78.1)	21.2 (70.2)	15.0 (59.0)	8.7 (47.7)	2.9 (37.2)	13.3 (55.9)
Mean daily minimum °C (°F)	−3.9 (25.0)	−3.0 (26.6)	0.5 (32.9)	5.4 (41.7)	11.3 (52.3)	17.3 (63.1)	21.7 (71.1)	21.9 (71.4)	16.5 (61.7)	8.8 (47.8)	2.8 (37.0)	−2.4 (27.7)	8.1 (46.6)
Record low °C (°F)	−15.5 (4.1)	−13.4 (7.9)	−11.3 (11.7)	−5.7 (21.7)	0.5 (32.9)	6.6 (43.9)	13.5 (56.3)	10.9 (51.6)	5.7 (42.3)	−2.9 (26.8)	−6.6 (20.1)	−12.1 (10.2)	−15.5 (4.1)
Average precipitation mm (inches)	28.2 (1.11)	42.4 (1.67)	78.7 (3.10)	108.5 (4.27)	121.6 (4.79)	187.0 (7.36)	275.3 (10.84)	316.5 (12.46)	163.6 (6.44)	63.4 (2.50)	54.8 (2.16)	31.8 (1.25)	1,471.8 (57.94)
Average precipitation days (≥ 0.1 mm)	7.9	6.7	8.5	8.5	9.2	9.8	13.9	12.9	8.9	5.3	7.6	7.9	107.1
Average snowy days	7.6	5.1	1.4	0.1	0.0	0.0	0.0	0.0	0.0	0.0	1.0	5.2	20.4
Average relative humidity (%)	67.0	64.9	65.3	66.1	70.1	76.3	82.7	80.8	77.8	72.3	70.9	68.9	71.9
Mean monthly sunshine hours	161.7	168.9	197.5	211.2	222.0	165.0	141.6	175.8	169.0	202.0	165.0	157.0	2,136.7
Percentage possible sunshine	51.4	55.2	54.9	57.8	54.9	45.8	41.7	53.3	53.1	63.0	56.3	52.3	53.0
Source: Korea Meteorological Administration (snow and percent sunshine 1981–2010)

== Tourist spot ==
- Vivi Ecotopia
- Oheon Old House
Oheon Old House

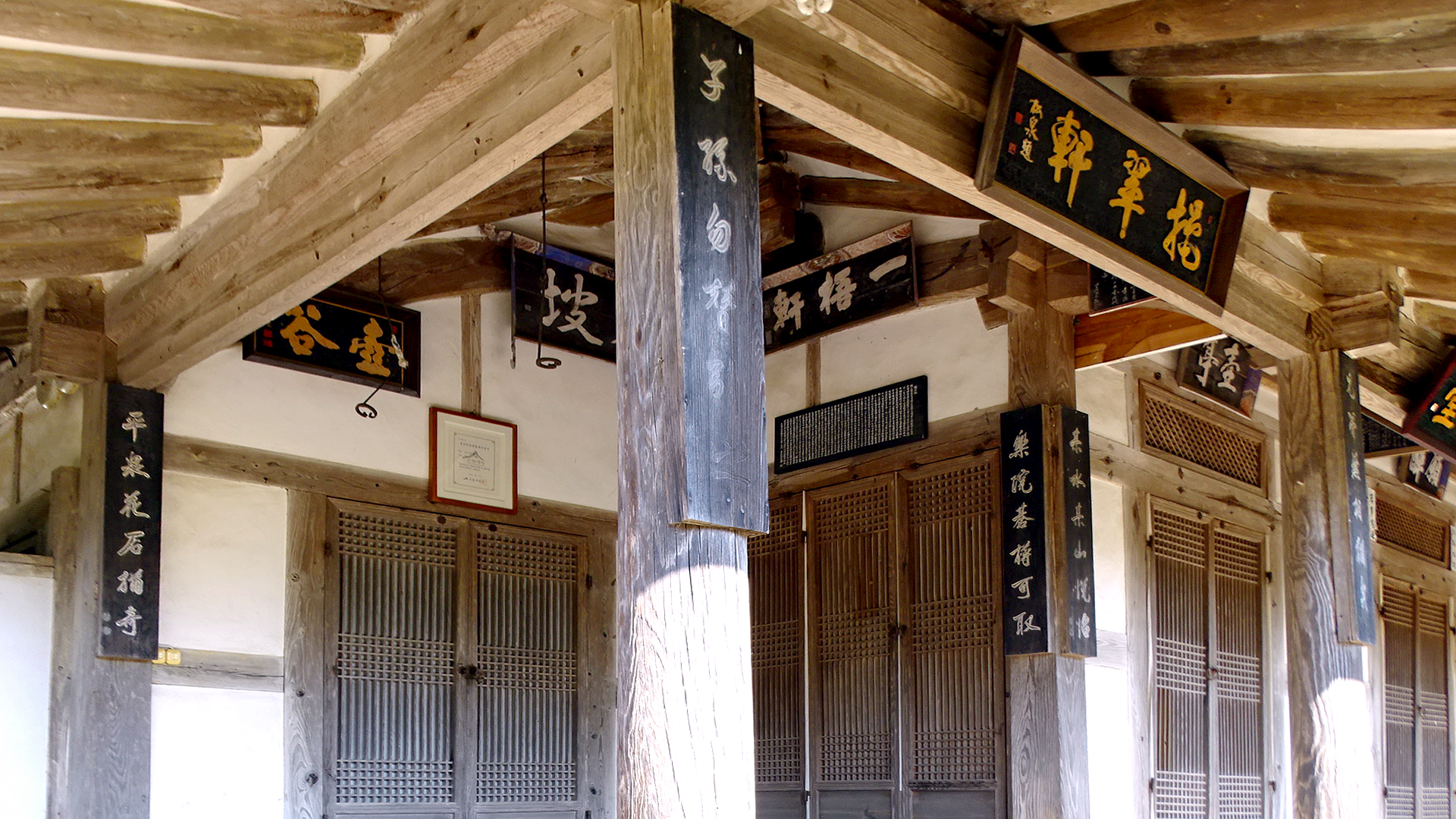
Sarangchae

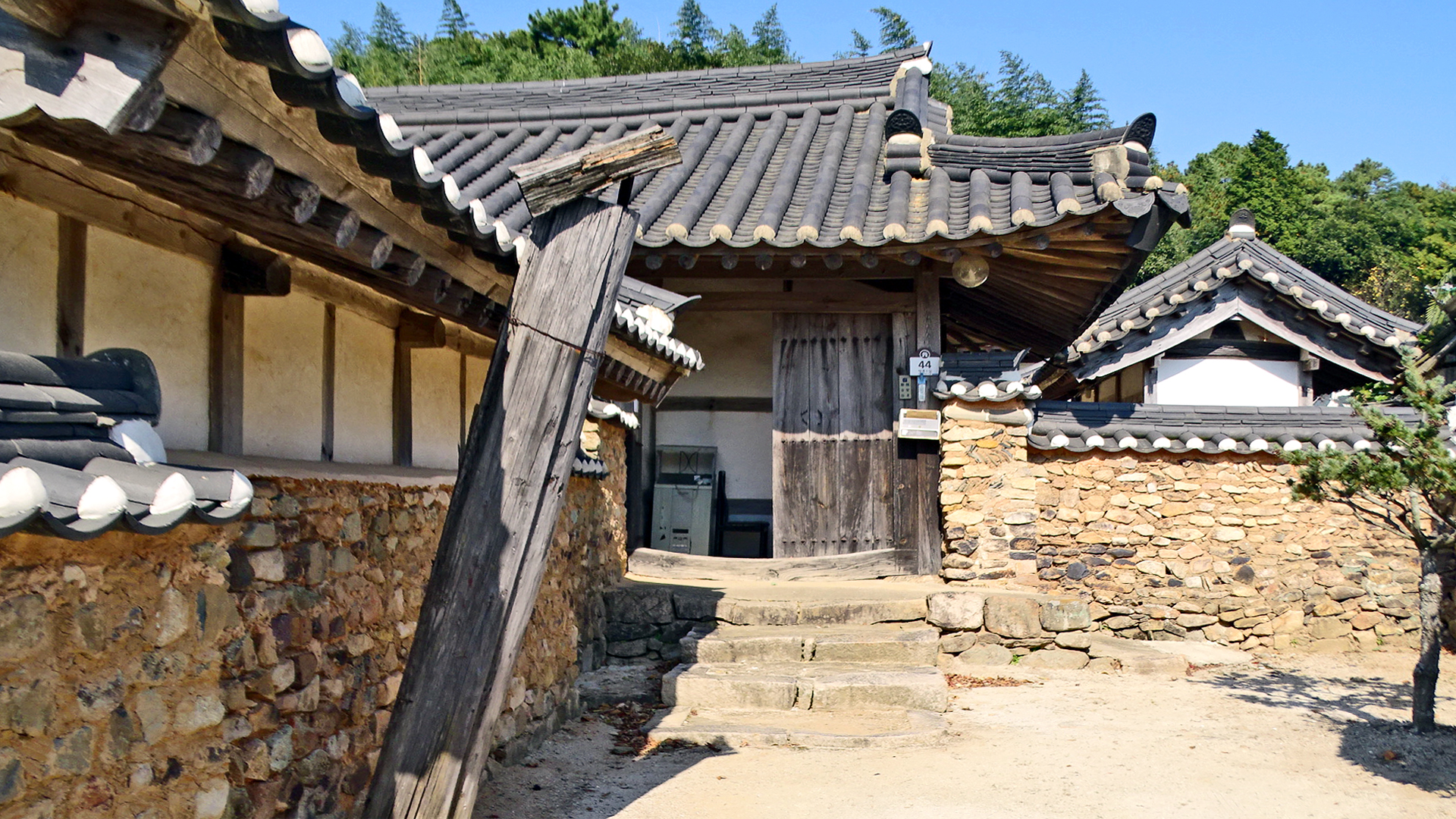

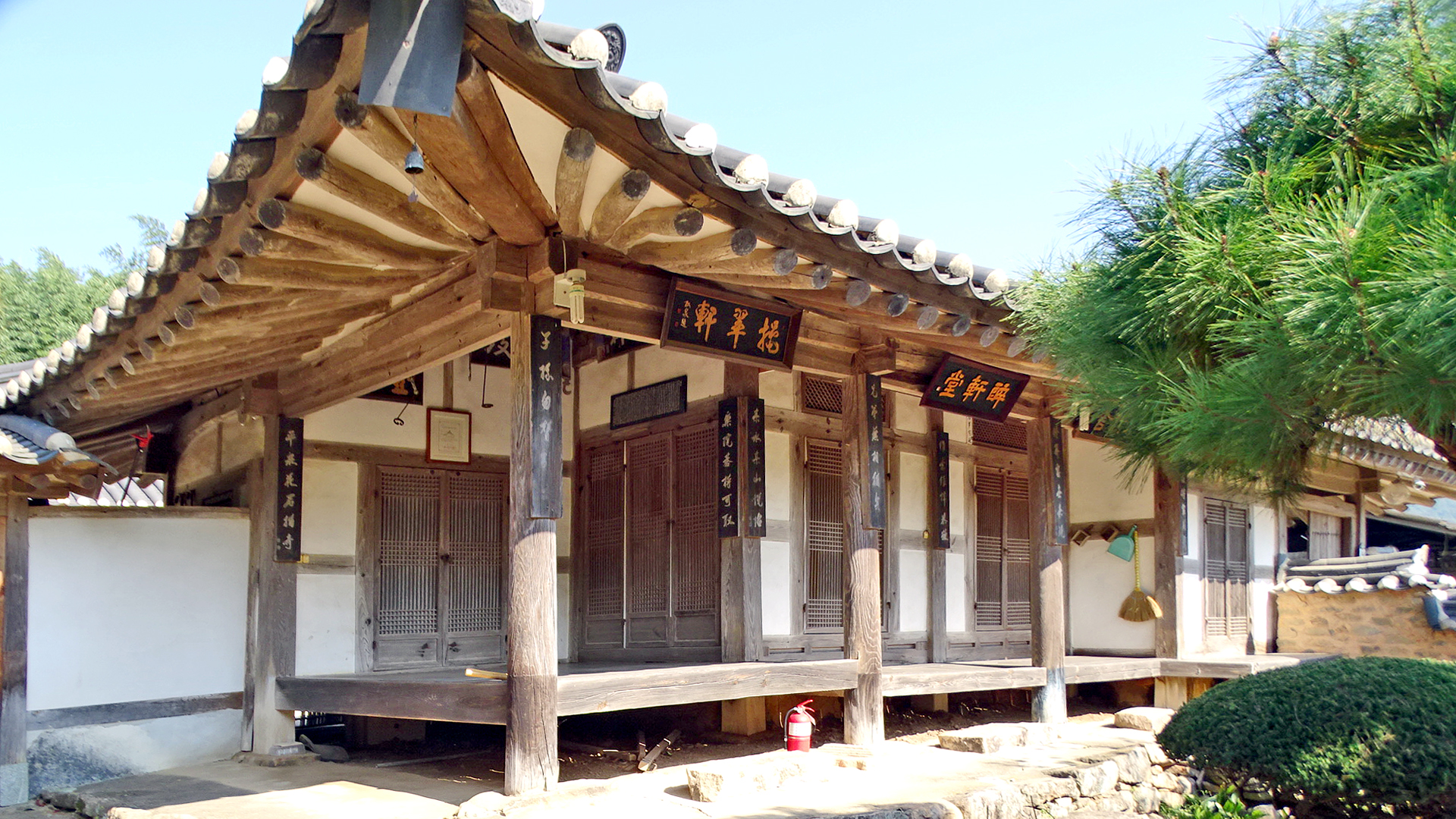
Sarangchae

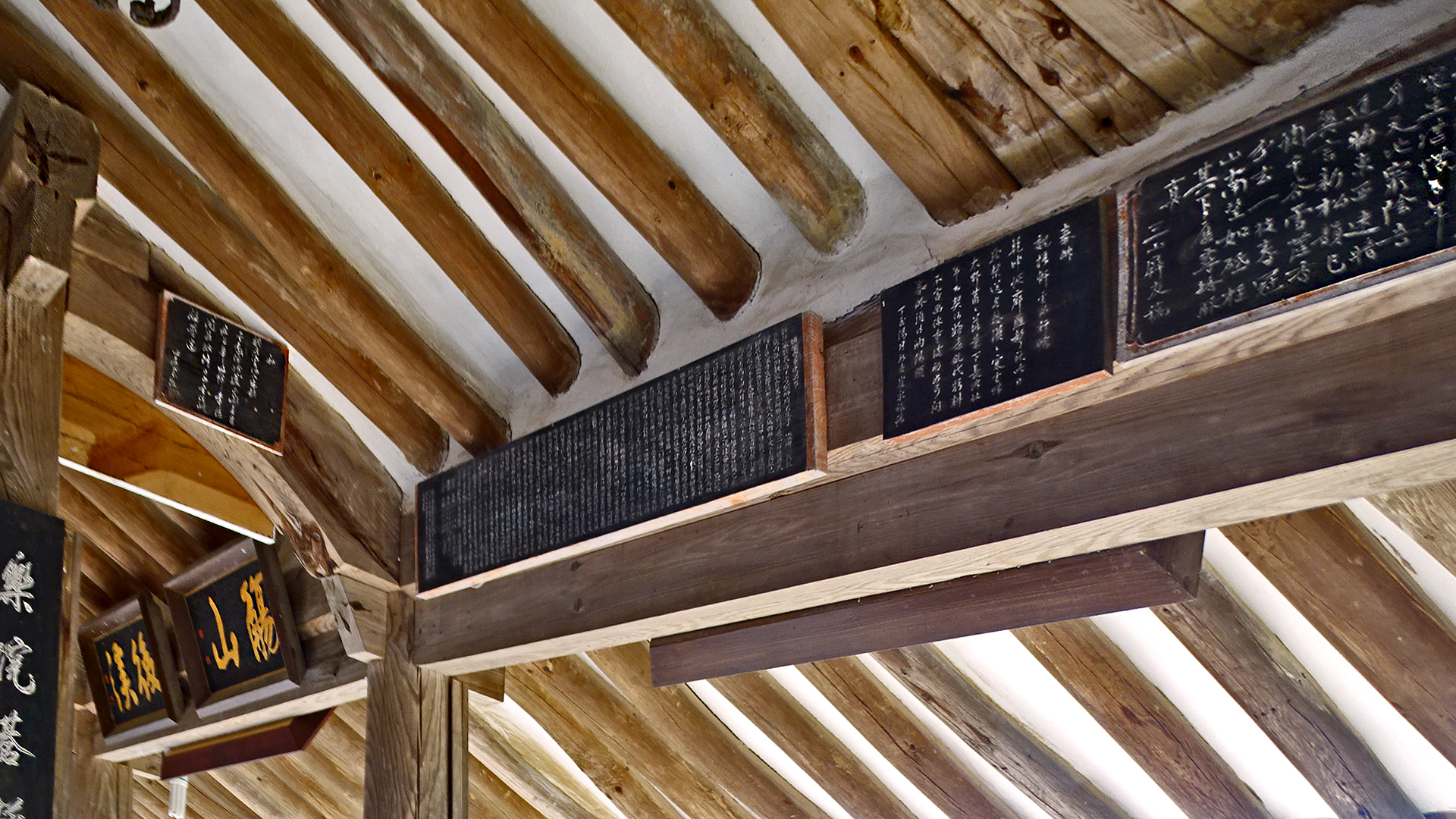
Sarangchae

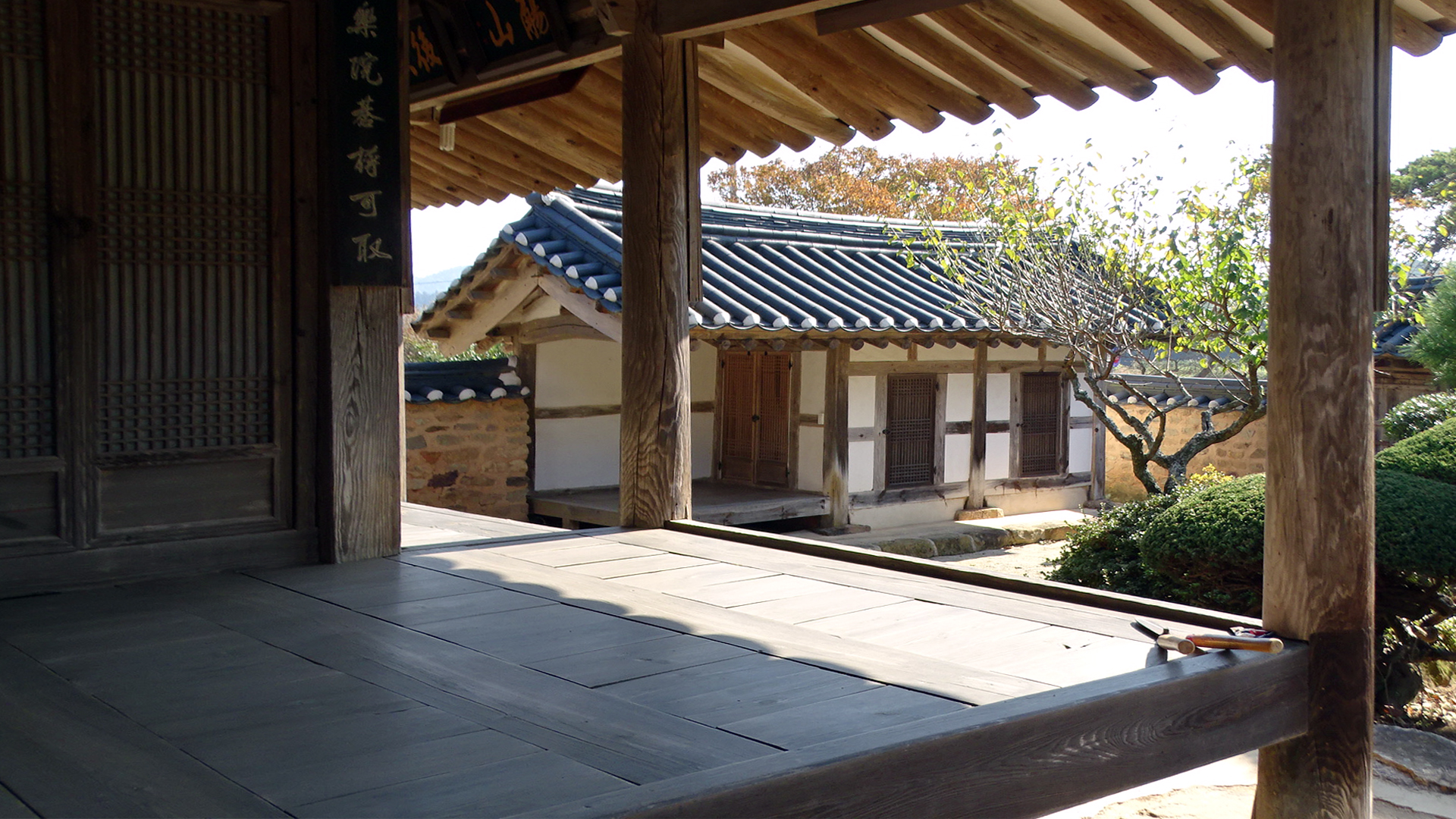
Haengnangchae

== Sister cities ==
- Haiyan, Taishan, China
- Dongjak-gu, Seoul South Korea since 1997
- Yeongdo-gu, Busan, South Korea
- Bundang, South Korea

== See also ==
- Cittaslow(Slow city)
