= Choo Mi-ae =

South Korean politician (born 1958)

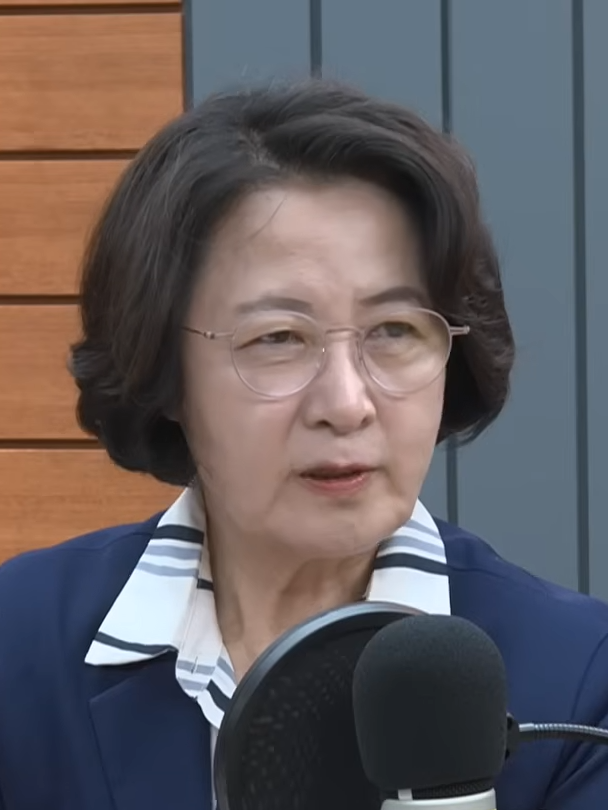
- Choo in 2026

Governor of Gyeonggi Province
- Incumbent
- Assumed office 1 July 2026
- Preceded by: Kim Dong-yeon

Minister of Justice
- In office 2 January 2020 – 27 January 2021
- President: Moon Jae-in
- Prime Minister: Lee Nak-yon; Chung Sye-kyun
- Preceded by: Cho Kuk; Kim Oh-soo (acting)
- Succeeded by: Park Beom-kye

Leader of the Democratic Party
- In office 27 August 2016 – 25 August 2018
- Preceded by: Moon Jae-in; Kim Chong-in (Interim)
- Succeeded by: Lee Hae-chan

Member of the National Assembly
- In office 30 May 2024 – 29 April 2026
- Preceded by: Choi Jong-yun (Hanam, Gyeonggi)
- Succeeded by: Lee Kwang-jae
- Constituency: Hanam A (Gyeonggi)
- In office 30 May 2008 – 29 May 2020
- Preceded by: Kim Hyung-ju
- Succeeded by: Ko Min-jung
- Constituency: Gwangjin B (Seoul)
- In office 30 May 1996 – 29 May 2004
- Preceded by: Kang Soo-lim (Seongdong C, Seoul)
- Succeeded by: Kim Hyung-ju
- Constituency: Gwangjin B (Seoul)

Personal details
- Born: 23 October 1958 (age 68) Daegu, South Korea
- Party: Democratic
- Education: Hanyang University; Yonsei University
- Website: www.choomiae.com

Korean name
- Hangul: 추미애
- Hanja: 秋美愛
- RR: Chu Miae
- MR: Ch'u Miae

Choo Mi-ae (Korean: 추미애; born 23 October 1958) is a South Korean politician who has served as the governor of Gyeonggi Province since 2026. A member of the Democratic Party of Korea (DPK), she was the party's leader from 2016 to 2018. Choo also served as the minister of justice from 2020 to 2021.

She is the first woman to hold the post after Kang Kum-sil who was appointed by then-president Roh Moo-hyun, a political mentor of the incumbent Moon Jae-in. She is also one of handful congresswomen who have served five or more terms at the National Assembly and the first to do so without ever being elected through proportional representation.

In 1996, she became the first woman to represent a constituency in Seoul since the Constitution was last revised as well as the first female ex-judge to be elected as a congresswoman. She has represented the same constituency since then except for four years between 2004 and 2008.

Choo unsuccessfully ran for the leadership of her party twice in 2003 and 2008. In 2016, she became the leader of Democratic Party. When Moon Jae-in got elected as the President of South Korea during her term in 2017, Choo became the first woman to be the leader of a ruling party. In 2018, she became the first leader of her party to complete its fixed term of two years. Additionally, she was the first female leader of her party and its first leader raised in TK region.

Choo was elected Governor of Gyeonggi Province in the 2026 South Korean local elections with a comfortable 16-point margin, and will become the first female head of a South Korean first-level administrative region government in the history.

== Political career ==
=== Entry into politics ===
Before her involvement in politics, Choo served as a district court judge for 12 years. She left her position in protest of government pressure to bring judgements against pro-democracy activists, and joined the opposition National Congress for New Politics. She entered the National Assembly in the 1996 elections as a member of the National Congress. She crossed regional barriers by being elected as a liberal despite originally hailing from the conservative stronghold of Daegu, and also became the first female member of the National Assembly to have served as a judge—followed by Na Kyung-won in 2004.

=== 1999 Jeju uprising inquiry ===
Choo became notable early in her career as an assemblywoman for being one of the first national politicians to draw public attention to the events of the 1948 Jeju uprising. She participated in a memorial service for the uprising in 1998, and chaired the first public inquiry into the events the next year. During the debate, Choo released a 200-page dossier listing 1,650 people who had been court-martialed for assisting the "communist rebellion" in Jeju. Her release of the papers marked the first time any official government document on the uprising had been released to the general public.

=== Party leadership contests and 2004 election campaign ===
Having served in the assembly for seven years, Choo ran for chairman of the Millennium Democratic Party in 2003, coming in second place behind Cho Soon-hyung. She came into conflict with Chough in the succeeding months in the crisis over the impeachment of President Roh Moo-hyun, with Choo urging Chough to step down over the events. After originally rejecting the role, she was appointed head of the party's election campaign committee less than three weeks before the 2004 parliamentary election. Her fight against regionalism in the party and her management of the party's campaign for the 2004 election during the impeachment crisis earned her the nickname "Choo d'Arc", comparing her to Joan of Arc. She lost her seat in the election.

After her re-election to the Assembly in 2008, Choo stood again for the leadership of the United Democratic Party at the party convention on 6 July 2008. She pushed to broaden and deregionalize the party, and enjoyed broad public support, but ultimately placed second behind Chung Sye-kyun.

=== Foreign affairs ===
Choo has served as a member of the Assembly's Foreign Affairs and Unification Committee, and in 2003, she was appointed special envoy to the United States on the North Korean nuclear crisis. Choo visited the United Kingdom in November 2010, giving lectures at Chatham House and the University of Cambridge on future policy in the Korean Peninsula.

== Electoral results ==
=== General elections ===
Year	Election	Constituency	Party affiliation	Votes	Percentage of votes	Results
1996	15th National Assembly General Election	Seoul Gwangjin B	National Congress for New Politics	36,570	43.77%	Won
2000	16th National Assembly General Election	Seoul Gwangjin B	Democratic Party (2000)	42,787	57.35%	Won
2004	17th National Assembly General Election	Seoul Gwangjin B	Democratic Party (2000)	26,973	30.08%	Defeated (2nd)
2008	18th National Assembly General Election	Seoul Gwangjin B	Democratic Party (2008)	34,854	51.29%	Won
2012	19th National Assembly General Election	Seoul Gwangjin B	Democratic United Party	45,980	55.19%	Won
2016	20th National Assembly General Election	Seoul Gwangjin B	Democratic Party of Korea	43,980	48.53%	Won
2024	22nd National Assembly General Election	Gyeonggi Hanam A	Democratic Party of Korea	51,428	50.58%	Won

=== Local elections ===
==== Governor of Gyeonggi ====
Year	Election	Constituency	Party affiliation	Votes	Percentage of votes	Results
2026	9th Iocal Election	Gyeonggi (Governoral Elections)	Democratic Party of Korea	3,760,080	55.04%	Won

== Controversies ==
Choo's son is accused of receiving favors during his military service. In 2016, she was convicted guilty for violation of Public Official Election Act due to spreading false information.

Choo has been criticized for her controversial step of not fully disclosing indictments against President Moon Jae-In's allies, of which she is one. Prosecutors have also criticized her broader proposed restructuring of prosecutors' offices.

While classified as being part of the liberal wing of the Democratic Party, she has been accused of expressing negative views towards feminism.

== Personal life ==
Choo is a Buddhist.

== See also ==
- Jeju 4.3 Committee

National Assembly of the Republic of Korea
Preceded by Kang Soo-lim (Seongdong C, Seoul)	Member of the National Assembly for Gwangjin B (Seoul); 30 May 1996–29 May 2004	Succeeded by Kim Hyeong-ju
Preceded by Kim Hyeong-ju	Member of the National Assembly for Gwangjin B (Seoul); 30 May 2008–29 May 2020	Succeeded by Ko Min-jung
Preceded by Choi Jong-yun (Hanam, Gyeonggi)	Member of the National Assembly for Hanam A (Gyeonggi); 30 May 2024–29 April 2026	Succeeded by Lee Kwang-jae
Political offices
Preceded by Cho Kuk; Kim Oh-soo (Acting)	Minister of Justice; 2 January 2021–27 January 2022	Succeeded by Park Beom-kye
Preceded by Kim Dong-yeon	Governor of Gyeonggi Province; 1 July 2026–	Incumbent
Party political offices
Preceded by Moon Jae-in; Kim Chong-in (Interim)	Leader of Democratic Party; 27 August 2016–25 August 2018	Succeeded by Lee Hae-chan
