= Linton (surname) =

Linton is a toponymic surname of Scottish, Irish and English origin.

== A ==
- Alby Linton (1926–2010), Australian rules footballer
- Andrew Linton (1893–1971), New Zealand cheesemaker, farmer and administrator
- Arthur Linton (1868–1896), British cycling champion

== B ==
- Barbara Linton (born 1952), Wisconsin politician and legislator
- Barry Linton (1947–2018), New Zealand cartoonist
- Bernard de Linton (fl. 1296), English priest
- Bob Linton (1902–1980), American baseball player

== C ==
- Con Linton (1938–2016), New Zealand sailor
- Curly Linton (1895–1985), Australian rules footballer

== D ==
- David Linton (geographer) (1906–1971), British geographer and geomorphologist
- David Linton (politician) (1815–1889), U.S. college fraternity founder
- Des Linton (born 1971), English footballer
- Doug Linton (born 1965), Major League Baseball pitcher

== E ==
- Edwin Linton (1855–1939), American biologist
- Edwin Linton (1855–1939), American helminthologist and parasitologist
- Eliza Lynn Linton (1822–1898), British novelist and essayist
- Ernest Linton (1880–1957), Canadian amateur soccer player

== F ==
- Frank B. A. Linton (1871–1943), American portrait painter

== G ==
- Gee Malik Linton (born 1973), American film director, screenwriter and producer
- George Linton (Barbadian cricketer) (1956–2014), Barbadian cricketer
- George Linton (Jamaican cricketer) (1873–1960), Jamaican cricketer
- Gordon Linton (born 1948), American transportation innovator

== H ==
- Hal Linton (born 1986), Barbadian singer
- Hans Linton (1939–2010), Swedish diplomat
- Henry Linton (1838–1866), English official of the Indian Civil Service and cricketer
- Hercules Linton (1837–1900), Scottish shipbuilder

== I ==
- Ivor Linton (born 1959), English footballer

== J ==
- J. Linton, Scottish footballer
- Jalon Linton (born 1984), cricketer
- J. W. R. Linton (1869–1947), West Australian artist and teacher
- James Linton (bishop) (1879–1958), Anglican bishop in Persia
- James Dromgole Linton (1840–1916), painter
- James Linton (hacker), email prankster and social engineer
- Jan Linton, British singer, musician and producer
- Jeff Linton (1909–1989), British Army officer and cricketer
- John Linton (1905–1943), Welsh Royal Navy submariner and recipient of the Victoria Cross
- John Tyler Linton (1796–1821), Virginia landowner and philanthropist
- Jonathan Linton (born 1974), American football player
- Joseph Ivor Linton (1900–1982), Israeli diplomat

== L ==
- Laura Alberta Linton (1853–1915), American chemist and physician
- Lennox Linton (born 1956), Dominican politician
- Lloyd Linton (born 1988), professional rugby union referee
- Louise Linton (born 1980), Scottish actress
- Lynette Linton (born 1990), British playwright and director

== M ==
- Malcolm Linton (born 1952), English footballer
- Marigold Linton (born 1936), American psychologist
- Marisa Linton, British historian
- Marjorie Linton (1917–1994), Canadian backstroke and swimmer
- Martin Linton (born 1944), British politician
- Meg Linton, American curator and writer
- Mildred Linton (1909–2003), better known as Karen Morley, American actor and political activist
- Murray Linton (1904–1980), New Zealand local politician

== O ==
- Óscar Linton (born 1993), Panamanian footballer
- Oliver Linton, British economist

== P ==
- Phyllis Linton (1929–2023), British swimmer

== R ==
- Ralph Linton (1893–1953), American anthropologist
- Rebecca Linton (born 1985), New Zealand swimmer
- Richard Linton (artist) (born 1935), Australian artist
- Richard Linton (educator) (born 1966), American academic
- Richard Linton (politician) (1879–1959), Australian politician
- Robert Ritchie Linton (1900–1979), Scottish vascular surgeon

== S ==
- Scott Linton (born 1989), Scottish footballer
- Simi Linton, American arts consultant, author, filmmaker and activist
- Stephen Winn Linton (born 1950), American humanitarian
- Steve Linton (born 2000), American football player
- Suzannah Linton, practising international lawyer and academic
- Sydney Linton (died 1894), Australian bishop

== T ==
- Tom Linton (born 1975), American guitarist in the band Jimmy Eat World

== W ==
- Wayne Linton (born 1955), Australian psychotherapist
- William C. Linton, founder and editor of the Chicago Whip newspaper
- William S. Linton (1856–1927), U.S. politician from Michigan
- William James Linton (1812–1897), Anglo-American author, artist and political reformer
- William Linton (artist) (1791–1876), British landscapist
- William Linton (physician) (1801–1880), Scottish army physician
- William Richardson Linton (1850–1908), British botanist
- William Alderman Linton (1891–1960), Presbyterian missionary and educator in Korea
- William Linton (songwriter), writer of the #1 hit song "Easier Said Than Done (The Essex song)"
