= List of members of the National Assembly (South Korea), 2024–2028 =

22nd National Assembly of South Korea
←	21st
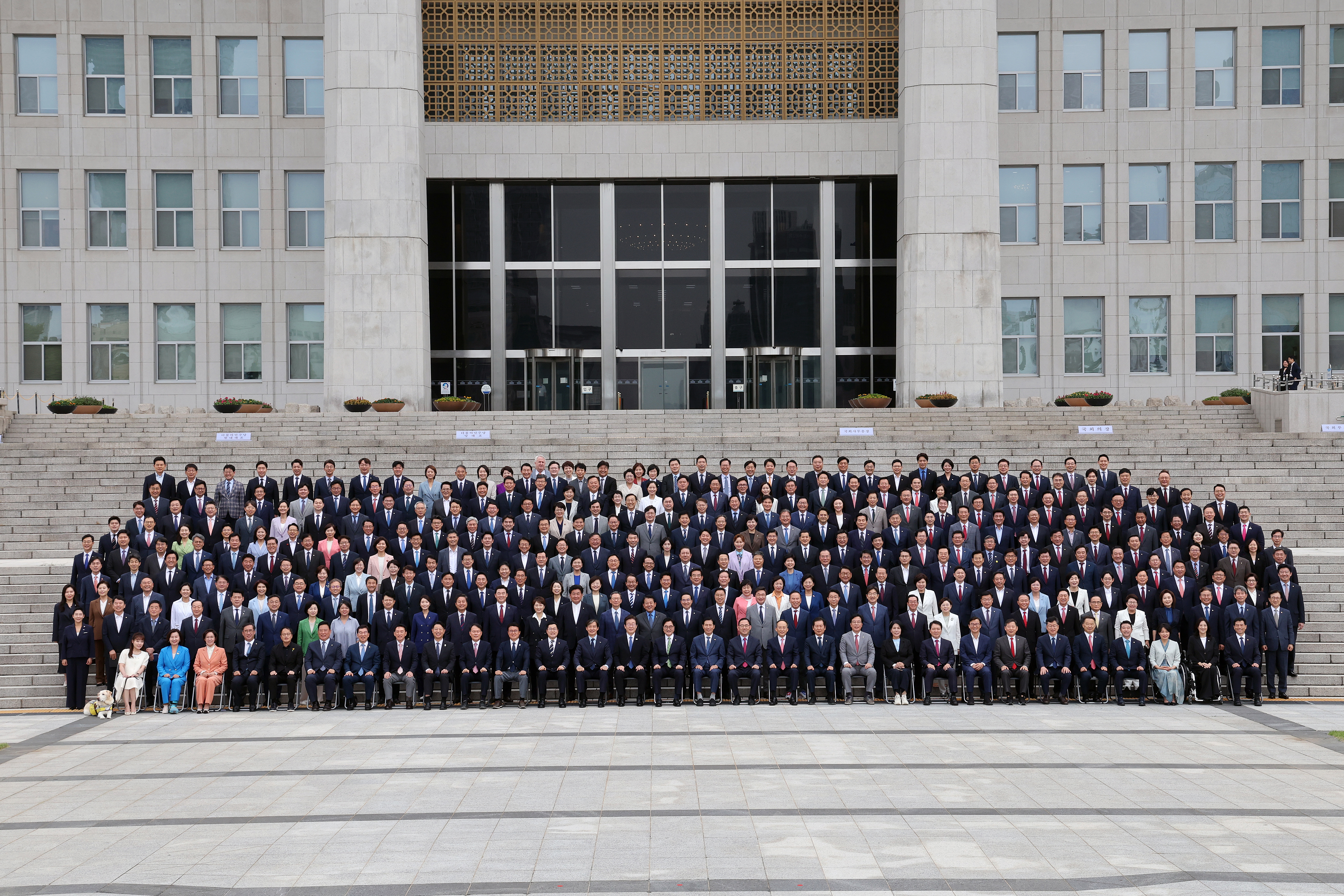
- Commemorative photo of the opening of the 22nd National Assembly

Overview
- Legislative body: National Assembly of South Korea
- Meeting place: National Assembly Proceeding Hall
- Term: 30 May 2024 – 29 May 2028
- Election: 2024 South Korean legislative election
- Government: Yoon Suk Yeol government (until 22 April 2025); Lee Jae Myung government (since 4 June 2025)

National Assembly
- Members: 300
- Speaker: Woo Won-shik (until 29 May 2026); Cho Jeong-sik (since 5 June 2026)
- Deputy Speakers: Lee Hack-young (Democratic) (5 June 2024 – 29 May 2026); Joo Ho-young (People Power) (27 June 2024 – 29 May 2026) Nam In-soon (Democratic) (since 5 June 2026); Park Duk-hyum (People Power) (since 5 June 2026)
- Prime Minister: Han Duck-soo (2025); Kim Min-Seok (2025–2026); Han Seong-sook (2026–)

The 22nd National Assembly of South Korea is the current session of the National Assembly of South Korea. Its members were first elected on 10 April 2024 and assumed office on 30 May 2024. The first session convened on 5 June 2024, and is scheduled to be seated until 29 May 2028.

== Composition ==
In the 2024 legislative election, more than eight political parties were elected to the Assembly.

Party	Original elected seats			Current seats (as of 16 July 2026)			Floor leader
Party	Con.	PR	Total	±	Total	%	Floor leader
Democratic	161	—N/a	161	-	161	53.7%	Han Byung-do
People Power	90	—N/a	90	▲19	109	36.3%	Jeong Jeom-sig
People Future	—N/a	18	18	merged into People Power			
Democratic Alliance	—N/a	14	14	merged into Democratic (Note: Excluding two members expelled to the Progressive Party, one member expelled to the Basic Income Party, and one member expelled to the Social Democratic Party)			
Rebuilding Korea	—N/a	12	12	—	12	4.0%	Kim Joon-hyung
Progressive	1	—N/a	1	▲3	4	1.3%	Yoon Jong-oh
New Reform	1	2	3	—	3	1.0%	Cheon Ha-ram
New Future	1	—N/a	1	▼1	—N/a	—N/a	—N/a
Basic Income	—N/a	—N/a	—N/a	▲1	1	0.3%	Yong Hye-in
Social Democratic	—N/a	—N/a	—N/a	▲1	1	0.3%	Han Chang-min
Independent	—N/a	—N/a	—N/a	▲8	8	2.7%	—N/a
Vacant	—N/a	—N/a	—N/a	▲1	1	0.3%	—N/a
Totals	254	46	300	—	300	100.0%	

== Changes ==
=== Changes in party affiliation ===
Date	Member	Constituency	From	To	Notes
25 April 2024	Jeong Hye-kyung	Proportional	Democratic Alliance	Progressive	Expelled from alliance and returned original member parties
25 April 2024	Yong Hye-in	Proportional	Democratic Alliance	New Progressive	Expelled from alliance and returned original member parties
25 April 2024	Han Chang-min	Proportional	Democratic Alliance	New Progressive	Expelled from alliance and returned original member parties
25 April 2024	Jeon Jong-deok	Proportional	Democratic Alliance	Progressive	Expelled from alliance and returned original member parties
26 April 2024	All 18 members of the People Future Party (Note: Choi Bo-yoon, Park Chung-kwon, Choi Soo-jin, Jin Jong-oh, Kang Sun-young, Kim Geon, Kim So-hee, Ihn Yo-han, Kim Min-jeon, Kim Ui-sang, Han Ji-ah, Yoo Yong-won, Cho Bae-sook, Kim Jang-gyum, Kim Yea-ji, Ahn Sang-hoon, Lee Dal-hee, Park Jun-tae,)	Proportional	People Future	People Power	Merged into People Power Party
30 April 2024	Yong Hye-in	Proportional	New Progressive	Basic Income	Expelled from alliance, returned to original member parties and renamed
30 April 2024	Han Chang-min	Proportional	New Progressive	Social Democratic	Expelled from alliance, returned to original member parties and renamed
2 May 2024	All 10 members of the Democratic Alliance	Proportional	Democratic Alliance	Democratic	Merged into Democratic Party
5 June 2024	Woo Won-shik	Seoul, Nowon A	Democratic	Independent	Elected as Speaker of the National Assembly (Note: South Korea's National Assembly Act requires the Speaker to officially sit as an independent)
1 September 2024	Kim Jong-min	Sejong, Sejong A	New Future	Independent	Left party to sit as an independent.
8 May 2025	Kim Sang-wook	Ulsan Nam A	People Power	Independent	Left party in the aftermath of the 2024 South Korean martial law crisis.
18 May 2025	Kim Sang-wook	Ulsan Nam A	Independent	Democratic	Joined the Democratic Party after paying tribute at the Gwangju May 18th National Cemetery.
6 August 2025	Lee Chun-seok	Jeonbuk, Iksan A	~~Democratic~~; Independent	Independent	Expelled from the Democratic Party for trading stocks under another person's name.
1 January 2026	Kang Sun-woo	Seoul, Gangseo A	Democratic	Independent	Left Democratic after accepting 100 million won in bribes for nominations of local candidates within her district.
19 January 2026	Kim Byung-kee	Seoul, Dongjak A	~~Democratic~~; Independent	Independent	Left the Democratic Party after an internal party ethics investigation.
20 March 2026	Jang Kyung-tae	Seoul, Dongdaemun B	~~Democratic~~; Independent	Independent	Left the Democratic Party after being charged with sexual assault.
30 May 2026	Woo Won-shik	Seoul, Nowon A	Independent	Democratic	Returned to the Democratic Party after end of term as Speaker..
5 June 2026	Cho Jeong-sik	Gyeonggi Siheung B	Democratic	Independent	Elected as Speaker of the National Assembly (Note: South Korea's National Assembly Act requires the Speaker to officially sit as an independent)

=== Resignations and expulsions ===
Date	Constituency	Incumbent		Date	New member		Notes
Date	Constituency	Member	Party	Date	Member	Party	Notes
12 December 2024	Proportional	Cho Kuk	Rebuilding Korea	13 December 2024	Paik Sun-hee	Rebuilding Korea	Incumbent expelled due to prison sentence. Replaced by the next member in the list.
4 June 2025	Incheon, Gyeyang B	Lee Jae Myung	Democratic	4 June 2026	Kim Nam-joon	Democratic	Elected President of the Republic of Korea Replacement elected in by-election on 3 June 2026.
4 June 2025	South Chungcheong, Asan B	Kang Hoon-sik	Democratic	4 June 2026	Jeon Eun-su	Democratic	Kang resigned after being appointed as Chief of Staff to the President. Replacement elected in by-election on 3 June 2026.
4 June 2025	Proportional Representation	Wi Sung-lac	Democratic	4 June 2025	Son Sol	Progressive	Took seat after Wi Seong-rak resigned to become Director of the National Security Office.
4 June 2025	Proportional Representation	Kang Yu-jung	Democratic	4 June 2025	Choi Hyuk-jin	Independent	Took seat after Kang resigned to become Spokesperson for the President. Expelled from Democratic Party. Refuse to rejoin Basic Income.
22 July 2025	Proportional Representation	Lim Gwang-hyeon	Democratic	22 July 2025	Lee Ju-hee	Democratic	Took seat after Lim resigned to become the Commissioner of the National Tax Service.
10 December 2025	Proportional Representation	Ihn Yo-han	People Power	12 January 2026	Lee So-hee	People Power	Ihn resigned after taking responsibility for the 2024 South Korean martial law crisis and not being able to fix the situation properly.
8 January 2026	Gyeonggi, Pyeongtaek B	Lee Byung-jin	Democratic	4 June 2026	Yu Eui-dong	People Power	Election invalidated for failing to report assets. Replacement elected in by-election on 3 June 2026.
8 January 2026	Jeonbuk Gunsan–Gimjae–Buan A	Shin Young-dae	Democratic	4 June 2026	Park Ji-won	Democratic	Election invalidated due to campaign manager's manipulation of public opinion. Replacement elected in by-election on 3 June 2026.
5 March 2026	Proportional Representation	Jeong Eul-ho	Democratic	5 March 2026	Kim Jun-hwan	Democratic	Resigned to become the 2nd Secretary for Political Affairs in the Presidential Secretariat. Replaced.
12 March 2026	Gyeonggi, Ansan A	Yang Mun-seok	Democratic	4 June 2026	Kim Nam-kuk	Democratic	Election invalidated due to obtaining a fraudulent loan in his daughter's name. Replacement elected in by-election on 3 June 2026.
30 April 2026	Busan, Buk A	Chun Jae-soo	Democratic	4 June 2026	Han Dong-hoon	Independent	Resigned to run for Busan Mayor in the 2026 local elections. Replacement elected in by-election on 3 June 2026.
30 April 2026	Daegu, Dalseong	Choo Kyung-ho	People Power	4 June 2026	Lee Jin-sook	People Power	Resigned to run for Daegu Mayor in the 2026 local elections. Replacement elected in by-election on 3 June 2026.
30 April 2026	Incheon, Yeonsu A	Park Chan-dae	Democratic	4 June 2026	Song Young-gil	Democratic	Resigned to run for Incheon mayor in the 2026 local elections. Replacement elected in by-election on 3 June 2026.
30 April 2026	Gwangju, Gwangsan-gu B	Min Hyung-bae	Democratic	4 June 2026	Im Moon-young	Democratic	Resigned to run for Jeonnam-Gwangju Governor in the 2026 local elections. Replacement elected in by-election on 3 June 2026.
30 April 2026	Ulsan Nam A	Kim Sang-wook	Democratic	4 June 2026	Kim Tae-gyu	People Power	Resigned to run for Ulsan mayor in the 2026 local elections. Replacement elected in by-election on 3 June 2026.
30 April 2026	Gyeongi, Hanam A	Choo Mi-ae	Democratic	4 June 2026	Lee Kwang-jae	Democratic	Resigned to run for Gyeonggi Province Governor in the 2026 local elections. Replacement elected in by-election on 3 June 2026.
30 April 2026	South Chungcheong, Gongju-si, Buyeo-gun, and Cheongyang-gun	Park Soo-hyun	Democratic	4 June 2026	Yoon Yong-geun	People Power	Resigned to run for South Chungcheong Governor in the 2026 local elections. Replacement elected in by-election on 3 June 2026.
30 April 2026	Jeonbuk, Gunsan–Gimje–Buan B	Lee Won-taeg	Democratic	4 June 2026	Kim Eui-gyeom	Democratic	Resigned to run for North Jeolla Governor in the 2026 local elections. Replacement elected in by-election on 3 June 2026.
30 April 2026	Jeju, Seogwipo	Wi Seong-gon	Democratic	4 June 2026	Kim Seong-beom	Democratic	Resigned to run for Jeju Governor in the 2026 local elections. Replacement elected in by-election on 3 June 2026.
16 July 2026	Gangwon, Gangneung	Kweon Seong-dong	People Power	7 April 2027	TBD	TBD	Lost seat after the Supreme Court upheld his 2-year jail sentence and fine. By-election scheduled for 7 April 2027.
30 August 2026	Proportional	Lee Hae-min	Rebuilding Korea	31 August 2026	Kim Hyung-yeon	Rebuilding Korea	Loss of seat due to leaving the party because of appointment as AI Future Planning Secretariat to the President.

== List of members ==
=== Constituency ===
==== Seoul ====
Constituency	Member	Year of birth	Party	Term	First elected	Notes
Jongno	Kwak Sang-eon	1971	Democratic	1st	2024	
Jung–Seongdong A	Jeon Hyun-hee	1964	Democratic	3rd	2008	
Jung–Seongdong B	Park Sung-joon	1969	Democratic	2nd	2020	
Yongsan	Kwon Yeong-se	1959	People Power	5th	2002	
Gwangjin A	Lee Jeong-heon	1971	Democratic	1st	2024	
Gwangjin B	Ko Min-jung	1979	Democratic	2nd	2020	
Dongdaemun A	Ahn Gyu-baek	1961	Democratic	5th	2008	
Dongdaemun B	Jang Kyung-tae	1983	Independent	2nd	2020	expelled from the Democratic in April 2026 following allegations of sexual crimes.
Jungnang A	Seo Young-kyo	1964	Democratic	4th	2012	
Jungnang B	Park Hong-keun	1969	Democratic	4th	2012	
Seongbuk A	Kim Young-bae	1967	Democratic	2nd	2020	
Seongbuk B	Kim Nam-geun	1963	Democratic	1st	2024	
Gangbuk A	Cheon Jun-ho	1971	Democratic	2nd	2020	
Gangbuk B	Han Min-su	1969	Democratic	1st	2024	
Dobong A	Kim Jae-sub	1987	People Power	1st	2024	
Dobong B	Oh Gi-hyoung	1966	Democratic	2nd	2020	
Nowon A	Woo Won-shik	1957	Democratic	5th	2004	Left the Democratic Party on 5 June 2024 to sit as an independent while serving as Speaker of the National Assembly (Note: South Korea's National Assembly Act requires the Speaker to officially sit as an independent) May 30 2026, he rejoined the Democratic Party.
Nowon B	Kim Sung-hwan	1965	Democratic	3rd	2018	
Eunpyeong A	Park Joo-min	1973	Democratic	3rd	2016	
Eunpyeong B	Kim Woo-Young	1969	Democratic	1st	2024	
Seodaemun A	Kim Dong-ah	1987	Democratic	1st	2024	
Seodaemun B	Kim Yeong-ho	1967	Democratic	3rd	2016	
Mapo A	Cho Jung-hun	1972	People Power	2nd	2020	
Mapo B	Jung Chung-rae	1965	Democratic	4th	2004	
Yangcheon A	Hwang Hee	1967	Democratic	3rd	2016	
Yangcheon B	Lee Yong-seon	1958	Democratic	2nd	2020	
Gangseo A	Kang Sun-woo	1978	Independent	2nd	2020	Left Democratic on 1 Jan 2026 for taking bribes while nominating local candidates within her constituency.
Gangseo B	Jin Seong-jun	1967	Democratic	3rd	2012	
Gangseo C	Han Jeoung-ae	1965	Democratic	4th	2012	
Guro A	Lee In-young	1964	Democratic	5th	2004	
Guro B	Youn Kun-young	1969	Democratic	2nd	2020	
Geumcheon	Choi Ki-sang	1969	Democratic	2nd	2020	
Yeongdeungpo A	Chae Hyeon-il	1970	Democratic	1st	2024	
Yeongdeungpo B	Kim Min-seok	1964	Democratic	4th	1996	
Dongjak A	Kim Byung-kee	1961	Independent	3rd	2016	Left Democratic on 19 Jan 2026 after an internal party ethics investigation.
Dongjak B	Na Kyung-won	1963	People Power	5th	2004	
Gwanak A	Park Min-kyu	1973	Democratic	1st	2024	
Gwanak B	Jeong Tae-ho	1963	Democratic	2nd	2020	
Seocho A	Cho Eun-hee	1961	People Power	2nd	2022	
Seocho B	Shin Dong-uk	1967	People Power	1st	2024	
Gangnam A	Suh Myung-ok	1960	People Power	1st	2024	
Gangnam B	Park Soo-min	1967	People Power	1st	2024	
Gangnam C	Koh Dong-jin	1961	People Power	1st	2024	
Songpa A	Park Jeong-hun	1971	People Power	1st	2024	
Songpa B	Bae Hyun-jin	1983	People Power	2nd	2020	
Songpa C	Nam In-soon	1958	Democratic	4th	2012	
Gangdong A	Jin Sun-mee	1967	Democratic	4th	2012	
Gangdong B	Lee Hae-sik	1963	Democratic	2nd	2020	

==== Busan ====
Constituency	Member	Year of birth	Party	Term	First elected	Notes
Jung–Yeongdo	Cho Seung-hwan	1966	People Power	1st	2024	
Seo–Dong	Kwak Kyu-taek	1971	People Power	1st	2024	
Busanjin A	Jeong Sung-kook	1971	People Power	1st	2024	
Busanjin B	Lee Hun-seung	1963	People Power	4th	2012	
Dongnae	Seo Ji-young	1975	People Power	1st	2024	
Nam	Park Soo-young	1964	People Power	2nd	2020	
Buk A	Han Dong-hoon	1973	Independent	1st	2026	
Buk B	Park Seong-hoon	1971	People Power	1st	2024	
Haeundae A	Ju Jin-woo	1975	People Power	1st	2024	
Haeundae B	Kim Mee-ae	1969	People Power	2nd	2020	
Saha A	Lee Seong-kweun	1968	People Power	2nd	2004	
Saha B	Cho Kyoung-tae	1968	People Power	6th	2004	
Geumjeong	Paik Jong-hun	1962	People Power	2nd	2020	
Gangseo	Kim Do-eup	1964	People Power	4th	2012	
Yeonje	Kim Hee-jung	1971	People Power	3rd	2004	
Suyeong	Jeong Yeon-uk	1965	People Power	1st	2024	
Sasang	Kim Dae-sik	1962	People Power	1st	2024	
Gijang	Chung Dong-man	1965	People Power	2nd	2020	

==== Daegu ====
Constituency	Member	Year of birth	Party	Term	First elected	Notes
Jung–Nam	Kim Ki-woong	1961	People Power	1st	2024	
Dong-Gunwi A	Choi Eun-seok	1967	People Power	1st	2024	
Dong-Gunwi B	Kang Dae-sik	1959	People Power	2nd	2020	
Seo	Kim Sang-hoon	1963	People Power	4th	2012	
Buk A	Woo Jae-jun	1988	People Power	1st	2024	
Buk B	Kim Seung-soo	1965	People Power	2nd	2020	
Suseong A	Joo Ho-young	1960	People Power	6th	2004	
Suseong B	Lee In-seon	1959	People Power	2nd	2022	
Dalseo A	Yoo Young-ha	1962	People Power	1st	2024	
Dalseo B	Yoon Jae-ok	1961	People Power	4th	2012	
Dalseo C	Kwon Young-jin	1962	People Power	2nd	2008	
Dalseong	Lee Jin-sook	1961	People Power	1st	2026	

==== Incheon ====
Constituency	Member	Year of birth	Party	Term	First elected	Notes
Jung–Ganghwa–Ongjin	Bae Jun-yeong	1970	People Power	2nd	2020	
Dong–Michuhol A	Heo Jong-sik	1962	Democratic	2nd	2020	
Dong–Michuhol B	Yoon Sang-hyun	1962	People Power	5th	2008	
Yeonsu A	Song Young-gil	1963	Democratic	6th	2000	
Yeonsu B	Chung Il-yung	1957	Democratic	2nd	2020	
Namdong A	Maeng Sung-kyu	1962	Democratic	3rd	2018	
Namdong B	Lee Hoon-gi	1965	Democratic	1st	2024	
Bupyeong A	Roh Jong-myeon	1967	Democratic	1st	2024	
Bupyeong B	Park Sun-won	1963	Democratic	1st	2024	
Gyeyang A	Yoo Dong-soo	1961	Democratic	3rd	2016	
Gyeyang B	Kim Nam-jun	1979	Democratic	1st	2026	
Seo A	Kim Kyo-heung	1960	Democratic	3rd	2004	
Seo B	Lee Yong-woo	1974	Democratic	1st	2024	
Seo C	Mo Gyeong-jong	1989	Democratic	1st	2024	

==== Gwangju ====
Constituency	Member	Year of birth	Party	Term	First elected	Notes
Dong–Nam A	Chung Jin-uk	1964	Democratic	1st	2024	
Dong–Nam B	Ahn Do-geol	1965	Democratic	1st	2024	
Seo A	Cho In-cheol	1964	Democratic	1st	2024	
Seo B	Yang Bu-nam	1961	Democratic	1st	2024	
Buk A	Jeong Jun-ho	1980	Democratic	1st	2024	
Buk B	Jun Jin-sook	1969	Democratic	1st	2024	
Gwangsan A	Park Kyoon-taek	1966	Democratic	1st	2024	
Gwangsan B	Lim Mun-yeong	1966	Democratic	1st	2026	

==== Daejeon ====
Constituency	Member	Year of birth	Party	Term	First elected	Notes
Dong	Jang Cheol-min	1983	Democratic	2nd	2020	
Jung	Park Yong-gab	1957	Democratic	1st	2024	
Seo A	Jang Jong-tae	1953	Democratic	1st	2024	
Seo B	Park Beom-kye	1963	Democratic	4th	2012	
Yuseong A	Cho Seung-rae	1968	Democratic	3rd	2016	
Yuseong B	Hwang Jung-a	1977	Democratic	1st	2024	
Daedeok	Park Jeong-hyeon	1964	Democratic	1st	2024	

==== Ulsan ====
Constituency	Member	Year of birth	Party	Term	First elected	Notes
Jung	Park Seong-min	1959	People Power	2nd	2020	
Nam A	Kim Tae-kyu	1967	People Power	1st	2026	
Nam B	Kim Gi-hyeon	1959	People Power	5th	2004	
Dong	Kim Tae-seon	1979	Democratic	1st	2024	
Buk	Yoon Jong-o	1963	Progressive	2nd	2016	
Ulju	Seo Beom-soo	1963	People Power	2nd	2020	

==== Sejong ====
Constituency	Member	Year of birth	Party	Term	First elected	Notes
Sejong A	Kim Jong-min	1964	Independent	3rd	2016	Left New Future on 1 September 2024.
Sejong B	Kang Jun-hyeon	1964	Democratic	2nd	2020	

==== Gyeonggi ====
Constituency	Member	Year of birth	Party	Term	First elected	Notes
Suwon A	Kim Seung-won	1969	Democratic	2nd	2020	
Suwon B	Baek Hye-ryun	1967	Democratic	3rd	2016	
Suwon C	Kim Young-jin	1967	Democratic	3rd	2016	
Suwon D	Kim Jun-hyuck	1969	Democratic	1st	2024	
Suwon E	Yeom Tae-yeong	1960	Democratic	1st	2024	
Seongnam Sujeong	Kim Tae-nyeon	1964	Democratic	5th	2004	
Seongnam Jungwon	Lee Soo-jin	1969	Democratic	2nd	2020	
Seongnam Bundang A	Ahn Cheol-soo	1962	People Power	4th	2013	
Seongnam Bundang B	Kim Eun-hye	1971	People Power	2nd	2020	
Uijeongbu A	Park Jee-hye	1978	Democratic	1st	2024	
Uijeongbu B	Lee Jae-kang	1962	Democratic	1st	2024	
Anyang Manan	Kang Deuk-ku	1963	Democratic	2nd	2020	
Anyang Dongan A	Min Byeong-deok	1970	Democratic	2nd	2020	
Anyang Dongan B	Lee Jae-jung	1974	Democratic	3rd	2016	
Bucheon A	Seo Young-seok	1964	Democratic	2nd	2020	
Bucheon B	Kim Gi-pyo	1972	Democratic	1st	2024	
Bucheon C	Lee Geon-tae	1966	Democratic	1st	2024	
Gwangmyeong A	Lim O-kyeong	1971	Democratic	2nd	2020	
Gwangmyeong B	Kim Nam-hee	1978	Democratic	1st	2024	
Pyeongtaek A	Hong Gi-won	1964	Democratic	2nd	2020	
Pyeongtaek B	Yu Eui-dong	1971	People Power	4th	2014	
Pyeongtaek C	Kim Hyun-jung	1969	Democratic	1st	2024	
Dongducheon–Yangju-Yeoncheon A	Jeong Seong-ho	1961	Democratic	5th	2004	
Dongducheon–Yangju-Yeoncheon B	Kim Seong-won	1973	People Power	3rd	2016	
Ansan A	Kim Nam-kuk	1982	Democratic	2nd	2020	
Ansan B	Kim Hyun	1965	Democratic	2nd	2012	
Ansan C	Park Hae-cheol	1965	Democratic	1st	2024	
Goyang A	Kim Sung-hoi	1972	Democratic	1st	2024	
Goyang B	Han Jun-ho	1974	Democratic	2nd	2020	
Goyang C	Lee Ki-heon	1968	Democratic	1st	2024	
Goyang D	Kim Young-hwan	1971	Democratic	1st	2024	
Uiwang–Gwacheon	Lee So-young	1985	Democratic	2nd	2020	
Guri	Yun Ho-jung	1963	Democratic	5th	2004	
Namyangju A	Choi Min-hee	1960	Democratic	2nd	2012	
Namyangju B	Kim Byung-joo	1962	Democratic	2nd	2020	
Namyangju C	Kim Yong-min	1976	Democratic	2nd	2020	
Osan	Cha Ji-ho	1980	Democratic	1st	2024	
Siheung A	Moon Jeong-bok	1967	Democratic	2nd	2020	
Siheung B	Cho Jeong-sik	1963	Independent	6th	2004	Left the Democratic Party on 5 June 2026 to sit as an independent while serving as Speaker of the National Assembly
Gunpo	Lee Hak-young	1952	Democratic	4th	2012	
Hanam A	Lee Kwang-jae	1965	Democratic	4th	2004	
Hanam B	Kim Yong-man	1986	Democratic	1st	2024	
Yongin A	Lee Sang-sik	1966	Democratic	1st	2024	
Yongin B	Son Myoung-soo	1966	Democratic	1st	2024	
Yongin C	Boo Seung-chan	1970	Democratic	1st	2024	
Yongin D	Lee Un-ju	1972	Democratic	3rd	2012	
Paju A	Yoon Hu-deok	1957	Democratic	4th	2012	
Paju B	Park Jeong	1962	Democratic	3rd	2016	
Icheon	Song Seok-jun	1964	People Power	3rd	2016	
Anseong	Yoon Jong-kun	1972	Democratic	1st	2024	
Gimpo A	Kim Ju-young	1961	Democratic	2nd	2020	
Gimpo B	Park Sang-hyuk	1973	Democratic	2nd	2020	
Hwaseong A	Song Ok-ju	1965	Democratic	3rd	2016	
Hwaseong B	Lee Jun-seok	1985	New Reform	1st	2024	
Hwaseong C	Kwon Chil-seung	1965	Democratic	3rd	2016	
Hwaseong D	Jeon Yong-gi	1991	Democratic	2nd	2020	
Gwangju A	So Byeong-hoon	1954	Democratic	3rd	2016	
Gwangju B	An Tae-jun	1969	Democratic	1st	2024	
Pocheon–Gapyeong	Kim Yong-tae	1990	People Power	1st	2024	
Yeoju–Yangpyeong	Kim Seon-kyo	1960	People Power	2nd	2020	

==== Gangwon ====
Constituency	Member	Year of birth	Party	Term	First elected	Notes
Chuncheon–Cheorwon–Hwacheon–Yanggu A	Heo Young	1970	Democratic	2nd	2020	
Chuncheon–Cheorwon–Hwacheon–Yanggu B	Han Gi-ho	1952	People Power	4th	2010	
Wonju A	Park Jeong-ha	1966	People Power	2nd	2022	
Wonju B	Song Ki-hun	1963	Democratic	3rd	2016	
Gangneung	~~Kwon Seong-dong~~		Vacant			Removed after receiving a two year prison sentence
Donghae–Taebaek–Samcheok–Jeongseon	Lee Cheol-gyu	1957	People Power	3th	2016	
Sokcho–Goseong–Yangyang–Inje	Lee Yang-soo	1967	People Power	3rd	2016	
Hongcheon–Hoengseong–Yeongwol–Pyeongchang	Yoo Sang-beom	1966	People Power	2nd	2020	

==== North Chungcheong ====
Constituency	Member	Year of birth	Party	Term	First elected	Notes
Cheongju Sangdang	Lee Kang-il	1967	Democratic	1st	2024	
Cheongju Seowon	Lee Goang-hee	1963	Democratic	1st	2024	
Cheongju Heungdeok	Lee Yeon-hee	1966	Democratic	1st	2024	
Cheongju Cheongwon	Song Jae-bong	1969	Democratic	1st	2024	
Chungju	Lee Jong-bae	1957	People Power	4th	2014	
Jecheon–Danyang	Eom Tae-young	1958	People Power	2nd	2020	
Boeun–Okcheon–Yeongdong–Goesan	Park Duk-hyum	1953	People Power	4th	2012	
Jeungpyeong–Jincheon–Eumseong	Lim Ho-seon	1964	Democratic	2nd	2020	

==== South Chungcheong ====
Constituency	Member	Year of birth	Party	Term	First elected	Notes
Cheonan A	Moon Jin-seok	1962	Democratic	2nd	2020	
Cheonan B	Lee Jae-kwan	1965	Democratic	1st	2024	
Cheonan C	Lee Jeong-mun	1973	Democratic	2nd	2020	
Gongju–Buyeo–Cheongyang	Yun Yong-keun	1969	People Power	1st	2026	
Boryeong–Seocheon	Jang Dong-hyeok	1969	People Power	2nd	2022	
Asan A	Bok Ki-wang	1968	Democratic	2nd	2004	
Asan B	Jeon Eun-su	1984	Democratic	1st	2026	
Seosan–Taean	Seong Il-jong	1963	People Power	3rd	2016	
Nonsan–Gyeryong–Geumsan	Hwang Myong-sun	1966	Democratic	1st	2024	
Dangjin	Eo Gi-gu	1963	Democratic	3rd	2016	
Hongseong–Yesan	Kang Seung-kyu	1963	People Power	2nd	2008	

==== North Jeolla ====
Constituency	Member	Year of birth	Party	Term	First elected	Notes
Jeonju A	Kim Yoon-deok	1966	Democratic	3rd	2012	
Jeonju B	Lee Seong-yoon	1962	Democratic	1st	2024	
Jeonju C	Chung Dong-young	1953	Democratic	5th	1996	
Gunsan-Gimje–Buan A	Kim Eui-kyum	1963	Democratic	2nd	2020	
Gunsan-Gimje–Buan B	Park Ji-won	1987	Democratic	1st	2026	
Iksan A	Lee Choon-seok	1963	Independent	4th	2008	Expelled from Democratic on 6 August 2025 for trading stocks under another person's name.
Iksan B	Han Byeong-do	1967	Democratic	3rd	2004	
Jeongeup–Gochang	Yoon Jun-byeong	1961	Democratic	2th	2020	
Namwon–Jangsu–Imsil–Sunchang	Park Hee-seung	1963	Democratic	1st	2024	
Wanju–Jinan–Muju	Ahn Ho-young	1965	Democratic	3rd	2016	

==== South Jeolla ====
Constituency	Member	Year of birth	Party	Term	First elected	Notes
Mokpo	Kim Won-i	1968	Democratic	2nd	2020	
Yeosu A	Jo Cheol-hyeon	1959	Democratic	2nd	2020	
Yeosu B	Cho Gye-won	1966	Democratic	1st	2024	
Suncheon–Gwangyang–Gokseong–Gurye A	Kim Moon-soo	1968	Democratic	1st	2024	
Suncheon–Gwangyang–Gokseong–Gurye B	Kwon Hyang-yeop	1968	Democratic	1st	2024	
Naju–Hwasun	Shin Jeong-hun	1964	Democratic	3rd	2014	
Damyang–Hampyeong–Yeonggwang–Jangseong	Lee Gae-ho	1959	Democratic	4th	2014	
Goheung–Boseong–Jangheung–Gangjin	Mun Geum-ju	1967	Democratic	1st	2024	
Haenam–Wando–Jindo	Park Jie-won	1942	Democratic	5th	1992	
Yeongam–Muan–Sinan	Seo Sam-seok	1959	Democratic	3rd	2018	

==== North Gyeongsang ====
Constituency	Member	Year of birth	Party	Term	First elected	Notes
Pohang Buk	Kim Jeong-jae	1966	People Power	3rd	2016	
Pohang Nam–Ulleung	Lee Sang-hwi	1963	People Power	1st	2024	
Gyeongju	Kim Seok-ki	1954	People Power	3rd	2016	
Gimcheon	Song Eon-seok	1963	People Power	3rd	2018	
Andong–Yecheon	Kim Hyeong-dong	1975	People Power	2nd	2020	
Gumi A	Gu Ja-geun	1967	People Power	2nd	2020	
Gumi B	Kang Myeon-ku	1977	People Power	1st	2024	
Yeongju–Yeongyang–Bonghwa	Lim Jong-deuk	1964	People Power	1st	2024	
Yeongcheon–Cheongdo	Lee Man-hee	1963	People Power	3rd	2016	
Sangju–Mungyeong	Lim Lee-ja	1964	People Power	3rd	2016	
Gyeongsan	Cho Ji-yeon	1987	People Power	1st	2024	
Uiseong–Cheongsong–Yeongdeok–Uljin	Park Hyeong-soo	1965	People Power	2nd	2020	
Goryeong–Seongju–Chilgok	Jeong Hee-yong	1976	People Power	2nd	2020	

==== South Gyeongsang ====
Constituency	Member	Year of birth	Party	Term	First elected	Notes
Changwon Uichang	Kim Jong-yang	1961	People Power	1st	2024	
Changwon Seongsan	Heo Seong-moo	1963	Democratic	1st	2024	
Changwon Masanhappo	Choi Hyeong-du	1962	People Power	2nd	2020	
Changwon Masanhoewon	Yoon Han-hong	1962	People Power	3rd	2016	
Changwon Jinhae	Lee Jong-uk	1965	People Power	1st	2024	
Jinju A	Park Dae-chul	1961	People Power	4th	2012	
Jinju B	Kang Min-gook	1971	People Power	2nd	2020	
Tongyeong–Goseong	Jeong Jeom-sig	1965	People Power	3rd	2019	
Sacheon–Namhae–Hadong	Seo Cheon-ho	1961	People Power	1st	2024	
Gimhae A	Min Hong-cheol	1961	Democratic	4th	2012	
Gimhae B	Kim Jeong-ho	1960	Democratic	3rd	2016	
Miryang–Uiryeong–Haman–Changnyeong	Park Sang-woong	1959	People Power	1st	2024	
Geoje	Seo Il-jun	1965	People Power	2nd	2020	
Yangsan A	Yoon Young-seok	1964	People Power	4th	2012	
Yangsan B	Kim Tae-ho	1962	People Power	4th	2011	
Sancheong–Hamyang–Geochang–Hapcheon	Shin Sung-beom	1963	People Power	3rd	2008	

==== Jeju ====
Constituency	Member	Year of birth	Party	Term	First elected	Notes
Jeju A	Moon Dae-lim	1965	Democratic	1st	2024	
Jeju B	Kim Han-gyu	1974	Democratic	2nd	2022	
Seogwipo	Kim Sung-bum	1968	Democratic	1st	2026	

=== Proportional representation ===
==== People Future ====
The following members were originally elected as members of the People Future Party, which merged into the People Power Party on 26 April 2024.

List number	Member	Year of birth	Party	Term	First elected	Notes
1	Choi Bo-yoon	1978	People Power	1st	2024	
2	Park Chung-kwon	1986	People Power	1st	2024	
3	Choi Soo-jin	1968	People Power	1st	2024	
4	Jin Jong-oh	1979	People Power	1st	2024	
5	Kang Sun-young	1966	People Power	1st	2024	
6	Kim Geon	1966	People Power	1st	2024	
7	Kim So-hee	1973	People Power	1st	2024	
~~8~~	~~Ihn Yo-han~~	~~1959~~	People Power	1st	2024	Resigned 10 December 2025
9	Kim Min-jeon	1965	People Power	1st	2024	
10	Kim Ui-sang	1959	People Power	1st	2024	
11	Han Ji-ah	1978	People Power	1st	2024	
12	Yoo Yong-won	1964	People Power	1st	2024	
13	Cho Bae-sook	1956	People Power	5th	2000	
14	Kim Jang-gyum	1961	People Power	1st	2024	
15	Kim Ye-ji	1980	People Power	2nd	2020	
16	Ahn Sang-hoon	1969	People Power	1st	2024	
17	Lee Dal-hee	1962	People Power	1st	2024	
18	Park Jun-tae	1981	People Power	1st	2024	
19	Lee So-hee	1986	People Power	1st	2026	Took office on 12 January 2026 following resignation of #8

==== Democratic Alliance ====
The following members were originally elected as members of the Democratic Alliance, which merged into the Democratic Party on 2 May 2024. (Note: Excluding two members expelled to the Progressive Party, one member expelled to the Basic Income Party, and one member expelled to the Social Democratic Party)

List number	Member	Year of birth	Party	Term	First elected	Notes
1	Seo Mi-hwa	1967	Democratic	1st	2024	
~~2~~	~~Wi Sung-lac~~	~~1954~~	Democratic	1st	2024	Resigned to become the Director of National Security Office of the Republic of Korea on 5 June 2025
3	Bak Seung-a	1985	Democratic	1st	2024	
~~4~~	~~Lim Gwang-hyeon~~	~~1969~~	Democratic	1st	2024	
5	Jeong Hye-kyung	1975	Progressive	1st	2024	Expelled to the Progressive Party on 25 April 2024
6	Yong Hye-in	1990	Basic Income	2nd	2020	Expelled to the New Progressive Alliance on 25 April 2024, returned to the Basic Income Party on 30 April 2024
7	Oh Se-hee	1955	Democratic	1st	2024	
8	Park Hong-bae	1972	Democratic	1st	2024	
~~9~~	~~Kang You-jung~~	~~1975~~	Democratic	1st	2024	Resigned to become the Presidential Spokesperson on 5 June 2025
10	Han Chang-min	1973	Social Democratic	1st	2024	Expelled to the New Progressive Alliance on 25 April 2024, returned to the Social Democratic Party on 30 April 2024
11	Jeon Jong-deok	1971	Progressive	1st	2024	Expelled to the Progressive Party on 25 April 2024
12	Kim Yoon	1966	Democratic	1st	2024	
13	Lim Mi-ae	1966	Democratic	1st	2024	
~~14~~	~~Jeong Eul-ho~~	~~1971~~	Democratic	1st	2024	
15	Son Sol	1995	Progressive	1st	2025	Took seat 9 June 2025 after the resignation of Wi Sung-lac
16	Choi Hyuk-jin	1970	Independent	1st	2025	Took seat 9 June 2025 after the resignation of Kang You-jung. Expelled from the Democratic Party on 13 June 2025. Refused to return to Basic Income
17	Lee Ju-hee	1978	Democratic	1st	2026	Took seat 23 July 2025 following Lim Gwang-hyeon's appointment as Commissioner of the National Tax Service
18	Kim Jun-hwan	1962	Democratic	1st	2026	Took seat 5 March 2026 following Jung Eul-ho's appointment as political secretary

==== Rebuilding Korea ====
List number	Member	Year of birth	Party	Term	First elected	Notes
1	Park Eun-jung	1972	Rebuilding Korea	1st	2024	
~~2~~	~~Cho Kuk~~	~~1965~~	Rebuilding Korea	1st	2024	Lost seat on 12 December 2024
~~3~~	~~Lee Hae-min~~	~~1973~~	Rebuilding Korea	1st	2024	Lost seat on 30 August 2026 due to inauguration to public office
4	Shin Jang-sik	1971	Rebuilding Korea	1st	2024	
5	Kim Seon-min	1964	Rebuilding Korea	1st	2024	
6	Kim Joon-hyung	1963	Rebuilding Korea	1st	2024	
7	Kim Jae-won	1975	Rebuilding Korea	1st	2024	
8	Hwang Un-ha	1962	Rebuilding Korea	2nd	2020	
9	Jung Choon-saeng	1969	Rebuilding Korea	1st	2024	
10	Cha Kyu-geun	1968	Rebuilding Korea	1st	2024	
11	Kang Gyeong-sook	1967	Rebuilding Korea	1st	2024	
12	Seo Wang-jin	1964	Rebuilding Korea	1st	2024	
13	Paik Sun-hee	1968	Rebuilding Korea	1st	2024	Took seat after the loss of #2
14	Kim Hyung-yeon	1966	Rebuilding Korea	1st	2026	Took seat after the loss of #3

==== New Reform ====
List number	Member	Year of birth	Party	Term	First elected	Notes
1	Lee Ju-young	1982	New Reform	1st	2024	
2	Cheon Ha-ram	1986	New Reform	1st	2024	

== Notes ==
Preceded by 2020–24	Members of the National Assembly	Succeeded by —
