= William Linton =

William Linton may refer to:

- William C. Linton, founder and editor of the Chicago Whip newspaper
- William S. Linton (1856–1927), U.S. politician from Michigan
- William James Linton (1812–1897), Anglo-American author, artist and political reformer
- William Linton (artist) (1791–1876), British landscapist
- William Linton (physician) (1801–1880), Scottish army physician
- William Richardson Linton (1850–1908), British botanist
- William Alderman Linton (1891–1960), Presbyterian missionary and educator in Korea
- William Linton (songwriter), writer of the #1 hit song "Easier Said Than Done (The Essex song)"

== See also ==
- Linton (surname)
