= Lee So-hee (politician) =

South Korean lawyer and politician (born 1986)

- 이소희

Member of the National Assembly
- Incumbent
- Assumed office January 12, 2026
- Preceded by: Ihn Yo-han
- Constituency: Proportional representation

Personal details
- Born: November 15, 1986 (age 39)
- Party: People Power Party (2022–2024; 2024–)
- Other political affiliations: People Future Party (2024)

Lee So-hee (Korean: 이소희, born 15 November 1986) is a South Korean politician and lawyer.

== Early life ==
She is a native of Dain-myeon, Uiseong-gun, North Gyeongsang Province. At the age of 15, while attending middle school, she suffered lower-body paralysis due to a medical accident during surgery for scoliosis. After passing the qualification exams for middle and high school, she earned a bachelor's degree in law from Ewha Womans University, followed by a master's degree in law from Kyungpook National University Law School and a doctorate in law from Yonsei University Law School.

== Early Career ==
After passing the bar examination, she worked as a senior investigator at the Korea Deposit Insurance Corporation from 2017 to 2021. Subsequently, she opened a law office in Sejong and practised law.

During South Korea's 2022 South Korean presidential election, she served as an advisor for youth and women's affairs in the campaign of People Power Party candidate Yoon Suk-yeol, and subsequently served as a proportional representation member of the 4th Sejong City Council (representing the People Power Party) from July 2022 to March 2024. Later, for the 2024 South Korean legislative election held in April 2024, she was nominated as a proportional representation candidate number nineteen for the People Future Party. On 12 January 2026, she succeeded to the proportional representation seat that had become vacant following the resignation of National Assembly member Ihn Yo-han.

== Education ==
- Bachelor's degree in law from Ewha Womans University.
- Master's degree in law from Kyungpook National University Law School.
- Doctorate in law from Yonsei University Law School.

== History ==
From 2017 until 2021, she served as a senior investigator at the Korea Deposit Insurance Corporation.

Later, she became an attorney at the Yeomin Law Firm.

During the 2022 South Korean presidential election, she served as a special advisor for Youth and Women's Affairs to Yoon Suk-yeol's People Power Party campaign.

She served as a member of the 4th Sejong Special Self-Governing City Council. However, she resigned from the role in March 2024. During her time on the council, she served as the chair of Educational Safety Committee.

In August 2022, she was appointed as a member of the People Power Party emergency response committee. In September 2022, she expressed her intention to resign from the committee.

In October 2023, she was appointed to the People Power Party innovation committee. The committee existed for sixty days and dissolved on 24 December 2023.

In 2025, she was appointed to the Special Committee for Party Reorganisation for the People Power Party.

Ahead of the 2025 South Korean presidential election, she participated in the Clean Primary Subcommittee of the People Power Party.

On 12 January 2026, following the resignation of Ihn Yo-han, she became a first term proportional representation member of the 22nd National Assembly succeeding Ihn.

Following her succession into the National Assembly, she was appointed to the Culture, Sports and Tourism Committee for the rest of the first half of the 22nd National Assembly. At the start of the second half of the 22nd National Assembly, she was appointed as a member of the Health and Welfare Committee.

== Authored works ==
- Autobiography: Even Though I Cannot Walk, I Rise Every Day (2024, Yemun)

== Election results ==
Year	Election	Term	Office	Constituency	Party	Votes	Vote share	Rank	Result	Notes
2022	Local elections	4th	City council member	Sejong Special Self-Governing City	People Power Party	71,729	48.50%	No 1	Elected	First term; 8th local elected term
2024	Legislative election	22nd	Member of the National Assembly	Proportional representation	People Future Party	10,395,264	36.67%	No 19	Elected	First term; succeeded Ihn Yo-han

== See also ==
- People Power Party
- People Future Party
- Sejong City Council
- List of members of the National Assembly (South Korea), 2024–2028
