= Kim Hee-jeong =

- Hangul: 김희정
- RR: Gim Huijeong
- MR: Kim Hŭijŏng

Kim Hee-jeong may refer to:

- Kim Hee-jung (actress, born 1970) (born 1970), South Korean actress
- Kim Hee-jung (actress, born 1992) (born 1992), South Korean actress
- Kim Hee-jeong (fencer) (born 1975), South Korean fencer
- Kim Hee-jung (politician), South Korean politician
