= Richard Linton =

Richard Linton may refer to:

- Richard Linton (artist)
- Richard Linton (politician)
- Richard Linton (educator)
