= Hae-min =

- Hangul: 해민
- RR: Haemin
- MR: Haemin

Hae-min (Korean: 해민) is a Korean given name. As of 2026, the name ranked 835th out of 36,179 male names and 700th out of 28,726 female names. A total of 840 people, consisting of 423 males and 417 females, were born with the name from 2008 to 2026.

Notable people with the name include:

- Hae Min Lee, Korean-American murder victim
- Lee Hae-min (politician), South Korean politician
- Park Hae-min, South Korean center fielder
- Bae Hae-min, South Korean footballer

== See also ==
- List of Korean given names
