= George Linton =

George Linton may refer to:

- George Linton (Jamaican cricketer) (1873–1960), Jamaican cricketer
- George Linton (Barbadian cricketer) (1956–2014), Barbadian cricketer
