= Choi Bo-yoon =

South Korean lawyer and politician (born 1978)

- 최보윤

Chief Spokesperson of the People Power Party
- Incumbent
- Assumed office 28 August 2025

Member of the National Assembly
- Incumbent
- Assumed office 30 May 2024
- Constituency: Proportional representation

Personal details
- Born: 27 April 1978 (age 48)
- Party: People Power Party (2024–)
- Other political affiliations: People Future Party (2024)
- Website: bychoi.com archived

Choi Bo-yoon (Korean: 최보윤, born 27 April 1978) is a South Korean politician and former legal professional.

She graduated from Seoul National University College of Law, and passed the 51st Bar Examination. After passing the exam, she suffered a medical accident that resulted in paralysis on the left side of her body, leaving her with a spinal cord impairment. Subsequently, she worked as a lawyer at Daeryun Law Firm and served as a member of the Ministry of Justice’s Human Rights Policy Advisory Group and the Korea Employment Agency for the Disabled’s Human Rights Management Committee.

Ahead of the 2024 South Korean legislative election, she joined the People Future Party and was placed first on its proportional representation list. Following the election, she secured a seat within the proportional representation quota and was elected as a member of the 22nd National Assembly.

== Education ==
- Graduated Hanyoung Foreign Language High School.
- Seoul National University College of Law.

== History ==
In 2009 she passed the 51st Bar Examination and completed the Judicial Research and Training Institute as part of its 41st class.

From 2014 she served as a steering committee member of the Seongnam City Centre for the Promotion of Rights of Persons with Disabilities and later becoming a member of the representative council of the Seongnam City Community Social Security Council. She also served as a board member of the Canaan Welfare Foundation.

Before entering the National Assembly she served as an attorney at Daeryun Law Firm.

Ahead of the 2024 South Korean legislative election, she joined the People Future Party and was assigned the number one on the proportional representation list and served as a spokesperson for the Central Election Campaign Committee for the People Future Party.

In April 2024, she was elected as a first term proportional representation member of the 22nd National Assembly.

She was appointed a member of the research group National Vision 2050 Forum.

In 2026, as part of the second half of the 22nd National Assembly, she was appointed a member of the Welfare Committee.

In 2025, she was appointed a chief spokesperson for the People Power Party.

Ahead of the 2025 South Korean presidential election, she joined the presidential campaign for Kim Moon-soo as a co-head of the Strategic Planning Committee.

=== Electoral history ===
| Year | Election | Legislature | Office | Constituency | Party | Votes | Vote share | Rank | Result | Notes |
|---|---|---|---|---|---|---|---|---|---|---|
| 2024 | General election | 22nd | Member of the National Assembly | Proportional representation | People Future | 10,395,264 | 36.67% | No. 1 | Elected | First term |

== See also ==
- People Future Party
- People Power Party
- List of members of the National Assembly (South Korea), 2024–2028
