= Lee Hack-young =

South Korean politician (born 1952)

- Lee in 2026

Deputy Speaker of the National Assembly
- In office June 5, 2024 – 29 May 2026 Serving with Joo Ho-young
- Speaker: Woo Won-shik
- Preceded by: Kim Young-joo
- Succeeded by: Nam In-soon

Member of the National Assembly
- Incumbent
- Assumed office May 30, 2012
- Preceded by: Kim Boo-kyum
- Constituency: Gunpo (Gyeonggi, 2012-2016, 2020-); Gunpo B (Gyeonggi, 2016-2020)

Personal details
- Party: Democratic Party of Korea

Korean name
- Hangul: 이학영
- Hanja: 李學永
- RR: I Hakyeong
- MR: I Hagyŏng

Lee Hack-young (Korean: 이학영) is a South Korean politician and member of the Democratic Party of Korea. Lee was elected deputy speaker of the National Assembly of South Korea during the 22nd National Assembly. Lee was first elected to the 19th National Assembly. In 2023, an Anti-Corruption Division of the Seoul Central District Prosecutor's Office investigated Lee based on allegations of preferential employment at Korea Integrated Logistics.

Lee has advocated for energy transition for the purposes of national security due to South Korea's reliance on energy imports. Lee participated in negotiations with China over territorial claims in the Yellow Sea.

== Electoral history ==
Election	Year	District	Party affiliation	Votes	Percentage of votes	Results
19th National Assembly General Election	2012	Gyeonggi Gunpo	Democratic United Party	65,506	51.32%	Won
20th National Assembly General Election	2016	Gyeonggi Gunpo B	Democratic Party	33,220	43.85%	Won
21st National Assembly General Election	2020	Gyeonggi Gunpo	Democratic Party	91,256	57.41%	Won
22nd National Assembly General Election	2024	Gyeonggi Gunpo	Democratic Party	89,561	56.92%	Won
