= William Alderman Linton =

American missionary in Korea (1891–1960)

- Born: Thomasville, Georgia, United States
- Died: 1960
- Other name: Ihn Don
- Education: Georgia Institute of Technology; Columbia Theological Seminary
- Relatives: John Alderman Linton (grandson)

William Alderman Linton (February 8, 1891 – 1960) was an American Presbyterian missionary and Korean independence activist. He moved to Korea in 1912 and engaged in various charitable activities there.

== Early life ==
William Alderman Linton was born February 8, 1891, in Thomasville, Georgia. William Linton's brother and sisters died and his parents separated in the first 10 years of his life. Cynthia McLean, Sunday School teacher, and M.M. Hull influenced his early life. Linton lived with Hull while he attended college and through this association met John Fairman Preston, who invited Linton to become a missionary to Korea.

== Educational ministry in Korea ==
To be an educational missionary in Korea, Linton conducted self-directed research and study, including Korean pronunciation training and earning additional degrees from Columbia Teacher's College and Columbia Theological Seminary.

Linton's key accomplishment as an educational missionary in Korea under Japanese rule was fighting for the rights of Korean students and participating in the anti-Japanese colonization movement as principal of Jeonju Shinheung High School. As a result of the school's refusal to participate in Shinto shrine worship, it was forced to shut down in 1937. Linton continued to seek the classification needed from the Japanese Government-General of Korea's Bureau of Education that would enable Korean students to continue their education without losing the opportunity to pursue higher education.

Following Japanese colonial rule of Korea and the Korean War, in 1956 Linton founded Daejeon College in Daejeon, and served as its first president. The college ultimately became known as Hannam University in 1982.

== Family ==
Even after Linton's death in 1960, his family has continued to serve Korea and is currently impacting Korean society in Christian missions, medical care, and public service.

Two of William Linton's sons, Hugh Linton and Thomas Dwight Linton, served as Christian missionaries in Korea. Hugh Linton planted more than 600 churches in South Jeolla province, served in the Korean War, and during the 1960s established several tuberculosis clinics. Dwight Linton planted churches in the Gwangju area and later, while living in the US, served on the board of Christian Friends of Korea for over a decade.

Two of Hugh Linton's sons have made significant contributions to Korea in medical care. John Alderman Linton is director of Severance Hospital's International Care Center located in Seoul and invented a new type of ambulance for Korea in 1993. In 2012, he was granted Korean citizenship in recognition of his contribution to Korean society. In 1995, Dr. Stephen Winn Linton established the Eugene Bell Foundation, named for William Linton's father-in-law who also served as a missionary in Korea. This non-profit organization provides medicine and medical equipment to North Korea and has provided treatment to more than 200,000 North Korean tuberculosis patients.
