= Lee Ju-young =

South Korean politician and paediatrician (born 1982)

- 이주영

Member of the National Assembly
- Incumbent
- Assumed office 30 May 2024
- Constituency: Proportional representation

Personal details
- Born: March 22, 1982 (age 44) Daegu, South Korea
- Party: Reform Party
- Education: Bachelor of Medicine, Dongguk University College of Medicine; Master of Medicine, Graduate School of Ulsan University

Lee Ju-young (Korean: 이주영, born 22 March 1982) is a South Korean politician and former paediatrician. She is a member of the 22nd National Assembly.

She graduated from Dongguk University College of Medicine, with a Bachelor of Medicine and Graduate School of Ulsan University with a Master of Medicine.

Ahead of the 22nd National Assembly election, she joined the Reform Party and was nominated as the number one candidate on the proportional representation list. She won the proportional representation seat.

== Education ==
- Bachelor of Medicine, Dongguk University College of Medicine.
- Master of Medicine, Graduate School of Ulsan University.

== See also ==
- Reform Party (South Korea)
- List of members of the National Assembly (South Korea), 2024–2028
