= Dudo (island) =

Island of Busan, South Korea

- Interactive map of Dudo

Geography
- Location: Annam-dong, Seo District, Busan, South Korea
- Coordinates: 35.0487°N 129.01492°E

Dudo (Korean: 두도) is a small rocky island in Annam-dong, Seo District, Busan, South Korea. It was designated as a park on December 20, 1972. It is located just south of Annam Park.

The island was possibly previously called Meoriseom (머리섬; lit. 'head island') or Daegariseom (대가리섬; lit. 'head island'); the origin of these names is uncertain.

It has a height of 59 m (194 ft), and an area of 19,080 m^{2} (205,400 ft^{2}). The island has sheer cliffs and is very rocky and rugged. It has over a dozen large sea caves on its sides. On its top are various trees. Archaeological excavations have found a large number of dinosaur fossils on the island. There is an unmanned lighthouse on the island. The island is reportedly popular for fishing.

In 2022, plans were announced for a bridge to be constructed between the island and the mainland. Concurrently, a trail would be constructed around the island that would connect to a trail on the mainland.
