= Jeong Eul-ho =

South Korean politician

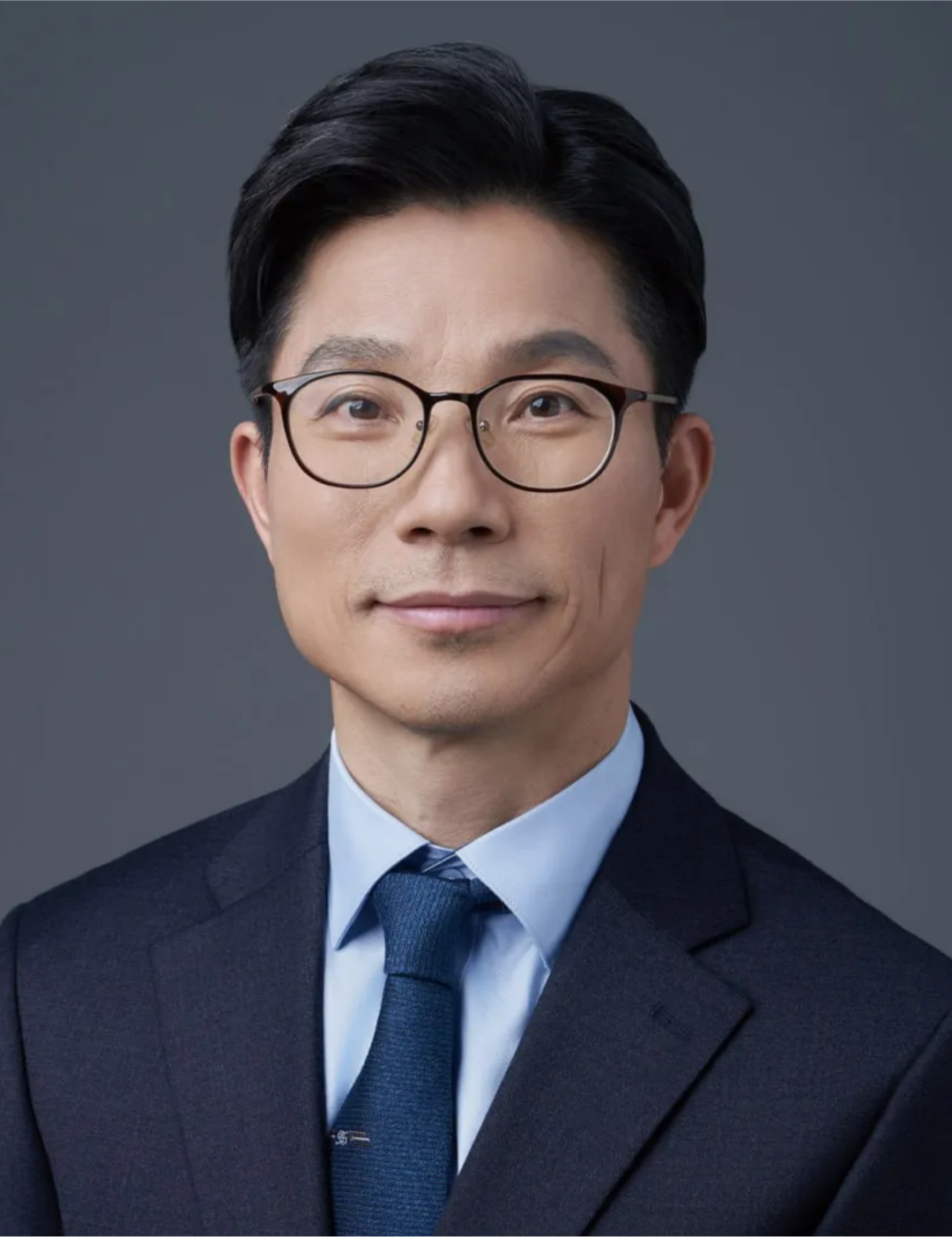
- Jeong in 2024

Presidential Political Affairs Secretary
- Incumbent
- Assumed office March 4, 2026

Member of the National Assembly
- In office 2024 – March 3, 2026

Personal details
- Born: 1971 (age 54–55) Gochang
- Education: Chung-Ang University

Jeong Eul-ho (Korean: 정을호) is a South Korean politician. He served as a member of the National Assembly and serves as the Political Affairs Secretary to the Presidential Office.

== Biography ==
Jeong was born in 1971 in Gochang. He graduated from Chung-Ang University. Jeong served as Chief of Staff to Kim Hye-kyung.

Jeong was a member of the 22nd National Assembly. Jeong resigned from his National Assembly seat to become the Political Affairs Secretary to the Presidential Office on March 3, 2026 to comply with the National Assembly Act. He became the Political Affairs Secretary on March 4, 2026.

== Election results ==
Year	Elections	Constituency	Political party	Votes (%)	Results
2024	22nd National Assembly General Election	Proportional representation (14th)	Democratic Alliance	7,567,459 (26.69%)	Elected
