= Namhang Bridge =

Namhangdaegyo
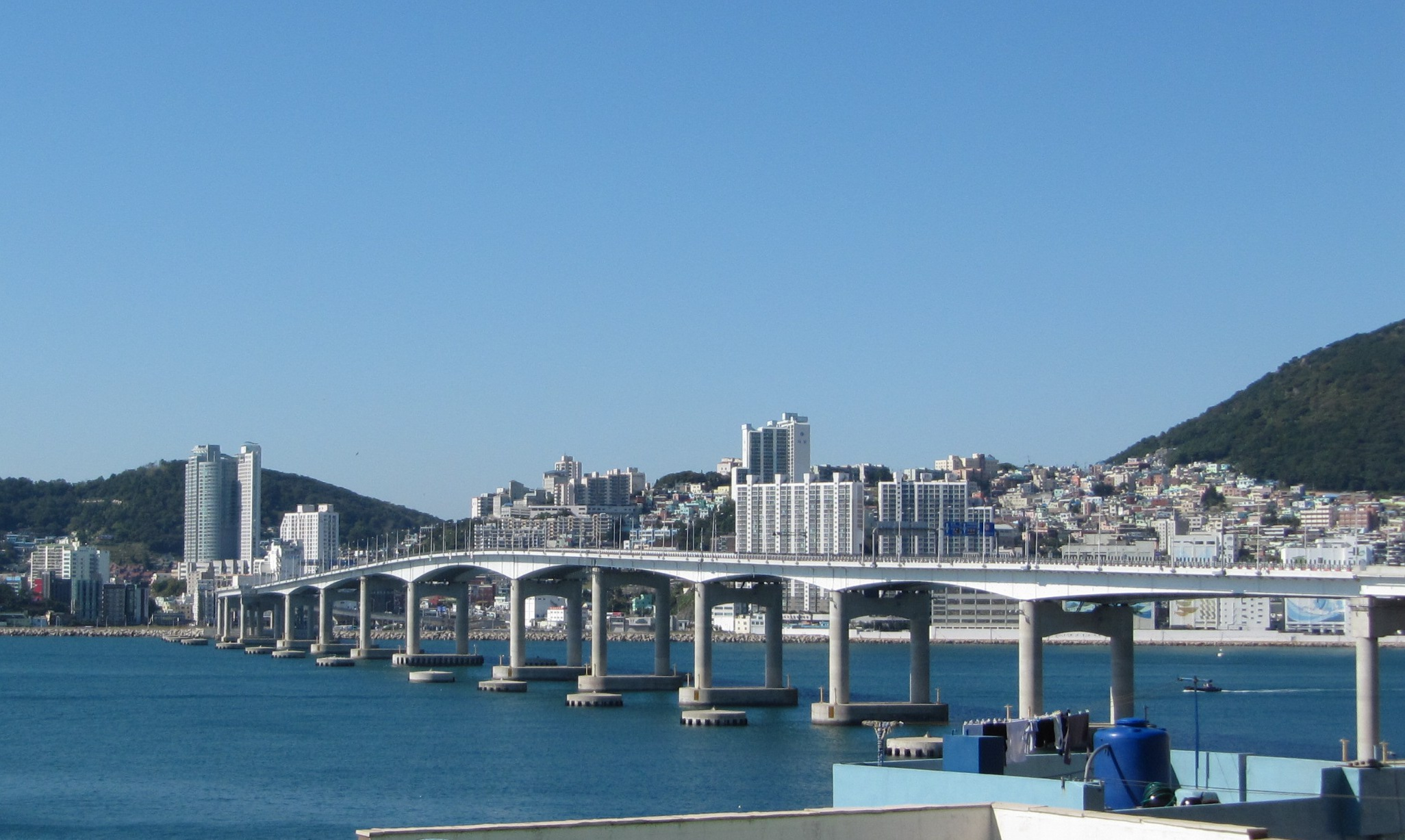
- Coordinates: 35°04′49″N 129°01′56″E
- Carries: 4 lanes of pedestrians and bicycles

Characteristics
- Total length: 1,941m

History
- Opened: 9 July 2008

Location
- Interactive map of Namhangdaegyo

Namhangdaegyo (남항대교) is a girder bridge in Busan. It spans Yeongdo-gu and Seo-gu and is 1.8 km long in total with four lanes of traffic (two in each direction).

== History ==
- broke ground in 1995
- 1998 stopped construction because of financial troubles
- July 9, 2008 opened to the public

== Effects ==
The bridge was constructed as part of the Southern Busan Thoroughfare (부산남부순환로) initiative. It has significantly reduced the time between Yeongdo Island and western Busan. Initially, a trip from Seo-gu to Yeongdo-gu (or vice versa) was 7 km long and would take 30 minutes. Now, it is only 2 km long and takes 3 minutes.

== See also ==
- Gwangandaegyo -another bridge part of the Southern Busan Thoroughfare
