= Park Hae-cheol =

South Korean politician (born 1965)

- 박해철
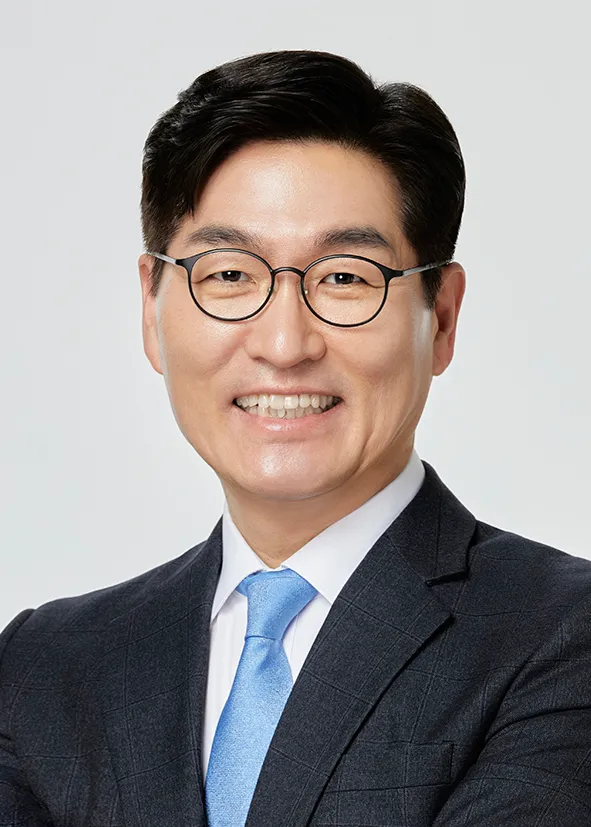
- Official portrait

Member of the National Assembly
- Incumbent
- Assumed office 30 May 2024

Personal details
- Born: October 8, 1965 (age 60) Daegu, South Korea

Park Hae-cheol (Korean: 박해철; born 8 October 1965) is a South Korean politician who currently serves as a member of the National Assembly.

== Biography ==
Prior to the 22nd National Assembly election in 2024, he was initially nominated by the Democratic Party for an Ansan City district. However, his nomination was overturned, leading to a contested primary. After the primary, Park was confirmed as the official nominee for the Ansan City district. He was subsequently elected as a member of the National Assembly.
