= Seo District, Busan =

District of Busan, South Korea

Coordinates: 35.10°N 129.02°E

Seo
- Autonomous District
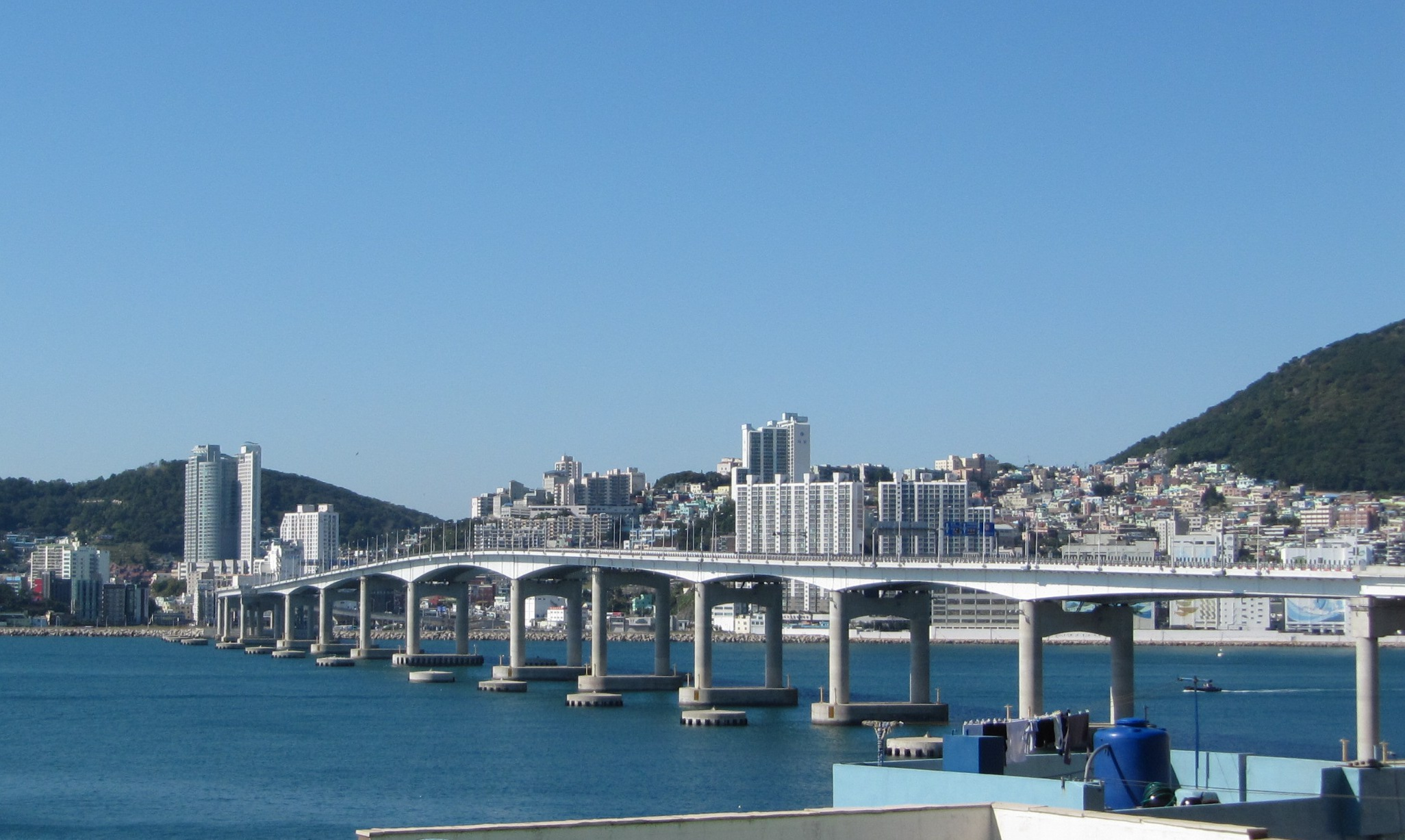
- Seo District and Namhang Bridge

- Flag

- Country: South Korea
- Region: Yeongnam
- Provincial level: Busan
- Administrative divisions: 14 administrative dong

Government
  - Mayor: Gong Han-su (공한수)

Area
  - Total: 13.67 km^{2} (5.28 sq mi)

Population (2024)
  - Total: 103,337
  - Density: 7,559/km^{2} (19,580/sq mi)
  - Dialect: Gyeongsang
- Website: Seo District Office

Korean name
- Hangul: 서구
- Hanja: 西區
- RR: Seo-gu
- MR: Sŏ-gu

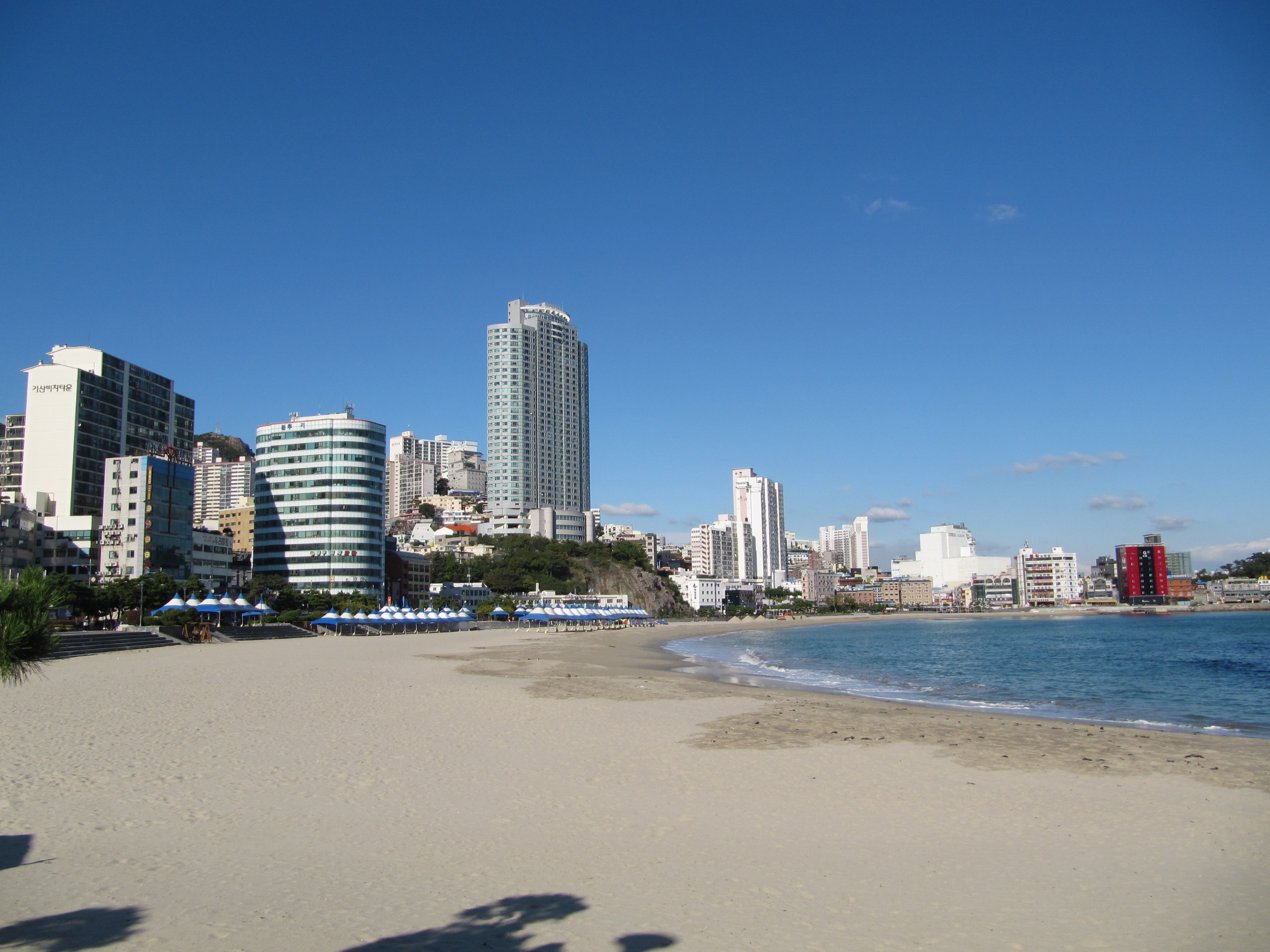
Songdo Beach

Seo District (Korean: 서구; lit. 'West District') is a gu, or district, in south-west central Busan, South Korea.

== Administrative divisions ==
Administrative divisions

Seo-gu is divided into 8 legal dong, which altogether comprise 14 administrative dong, as follows:

- Dongdaesin-dong/East Daesin (3 administrative dong)
- Seodaesin-dong/West Daesin (3 administrative dong)
- Bumin-dong
- Ami-dong
- Chojang-dong
- Chungmu-dong
- Nambumin-dong/South Bumin (3 administrative dong)
- Amnam-dong

In 1998 Ami 1-dong and Ami 2-dong were merged. In 2003 Seodaesin 2-dong and Seodaesin 1-dong were merged.

The district contains the island Dudo.

== Politics ==
The area is represented in the National Assembly by the West District and East District Busan (South Korean Legislature Constituency)

== Sister cities ==
- Changhai, China

== See also ==
- Geography of South Korea
- Subdivisions of South Korea
