= J. Linton =

Scottish footballer

Personal information
- Position: Winger

Senior career*
| Years | Team | Apps | (Gls) |
| 1892–1893 | Dundee | | |
| 1893 | Grimsby Town | 1 | (0) |
- * Club domestic league appearances and goals

J. Linton is an English professional footballer who plays as a winger.
