= Seo–Dong, Busan =

Constituency in Busan, South Korea

- Single-member constituency for the National Assembly
- Location of the constituency
- District(s): Seo District, Busan and Dong District, Busan
- Region: Busan
- Electorate: 172,850 (2024)

Current constituency
- Created: 2016
- Seats: 1
- Party: People Power Party
- Member: Kwak Kyu-taek
- Created from: Seo, Busan and Jung–Dong, Busan

Seo–Dong, Busan (Korean: 부산광역시 서구·동구) is a constituency of the National Assembly of South Korea. The constituency consists of Busan's Seo District and Dong District. As of 2024, 172,850 eligible voters were registered in the constituency.

== History ==
The constituency was established ahead of the 2016 South Korean legislative election from the former Seo constituency and Jung–Dong constituency.

Like the vast majority of constituencies located in Busan, Seo–Dong is considered a safe seat for the conservative People Power Party and its predecessor parties.

== Boundaries ==
The constituency encompasses all neighborhoods within the Seo and Dong Districts of Busan.

== List of members of the National Assembly ==
Election	Member	Party	Dates	Notes
2016	Yoo Ki-joon	Saenuri	2016–2020	
2020	An Byung-gil	United Future	2020–2024	
2024	Kwak Kyu-taek	People Power	2024–present	

== Election results ==
=== 2024 ===
Legislative Election 2024: Seo‒Dong, Busan
Party	Candidate	Votes	%	±%
People Power	Kwak Kyu-taek	64,884	57.95	▲1.91
Democratic	Choi Hyeong-uk	47,066	42.04	▼0.16
Rejected ballots		1,831	–	
Turnout		113,781	65.83	▲0.6
Registered electors		172,850		
People Power hold		Swing		

=== 2020 ===
Legislative Election 2020: Seo–Dong, Busan
Party	Candidate	Votes	%	±%
United Future	An Byung-gil	63,885	56.04	+3.84
Democratic	Lee Jae-kang	48,094	42.20	+7.39
Our Republican	Kim Tae-soo	1,162	1.04	new
National Revolutionary	Kim Seong-gi	834	0.73	new
Rejected ballots		1,837	–	
Turnout		115,782	65.23	+14.06
Registered electors		177,509		
United Future hold		Swing		

=== 2016 ===
Legislative Election 2016: Seo–Dong, Busan
Party	Candidate	Votes	%	±%
Saenuri	Yoo Ki-joon	47,577	52.20	–
Democratic	Lee Jae-kang	31,724	34.81	–
Independent	Lim Jeong-seok	11,833	12.98	–
Rejected ballots		1,865	–	
Turnout		92,999	51.17	–
Registered electors		181,730		
Saenuri win (new seat)				

== See also ==
- List of constituencies of the National Assembly of South Korea
