= Ihn Yo-han =

American-South Korean politician (born 1959)

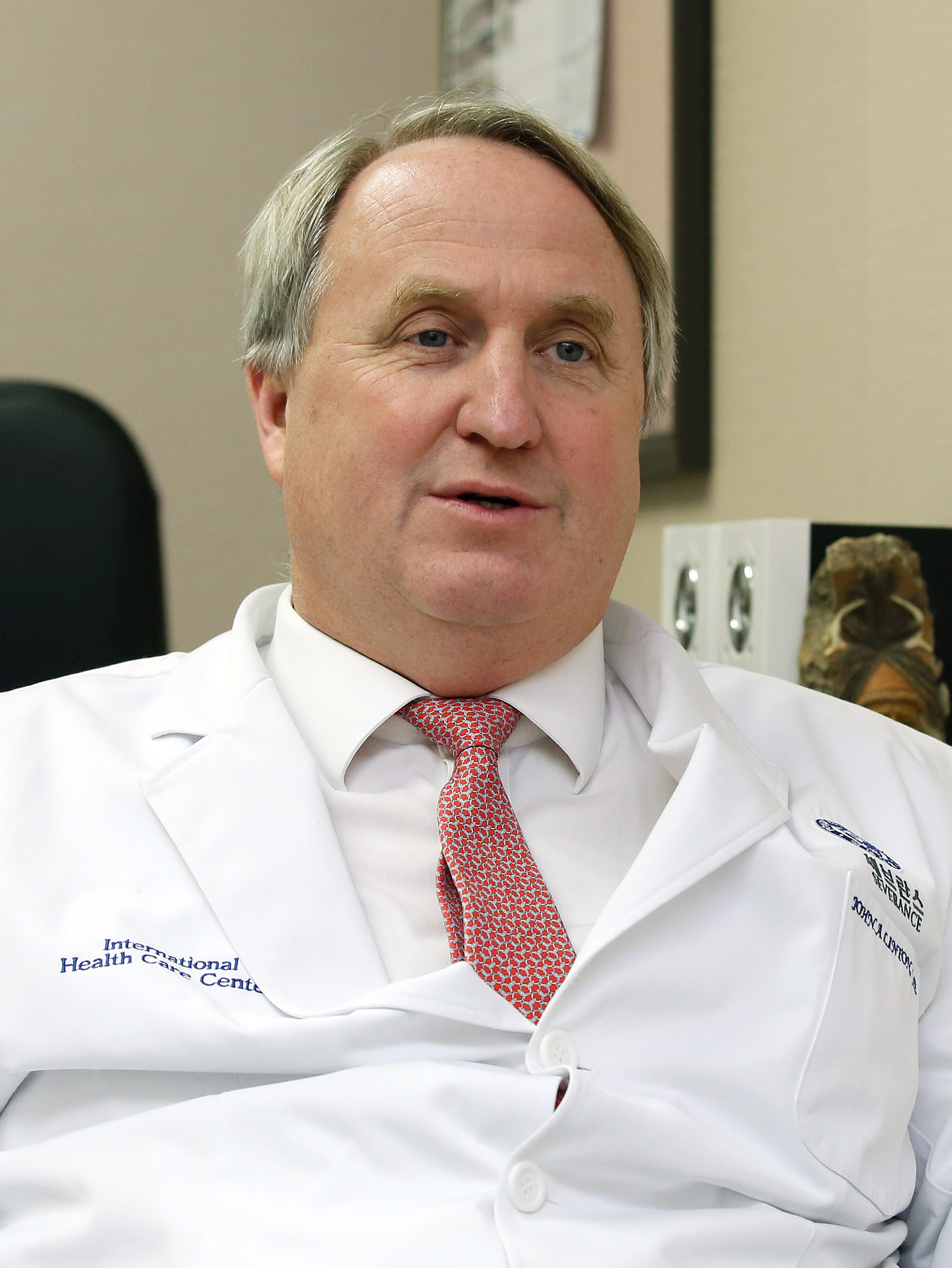
- Ihn in 2014

Member of the National Assembly
- In office 30 May 2024 – 9 January 2026
- Constituency: Proportional

Personal details
- Born: John Alderman Linton; December 8, 1959 (age 66) Jeonju, South Korea
- Citizenship: United States; South Korea (since 2012)
- Party: People Future Party (since 2024)
- Other political affiliations: People Power
- Relations: William Alderman Linton (grandfather)
- Education: Yonsei University
- Occupation: Physician; politician
- Known for: Contributions to emergency medicine

Korean name
- Hangul: 인요한
- Hanja: 印曜翰
- RR: In Yohan
- MR: In Yohan

Ihn Yo-han (Korean: 인요한; born John Alderman Linton, 8 December 1959) is an American (Note: Even after acquiring South Korean citizenship, he was allowed to retain his American citizenship by pledging that he would not use his foreign citizenship in South Korea.) and South Korean physician and politician who served as a member of the 22nd National Assembly of South Korea from 2024 to 2025. He received South Korean citizenship in 2012. Since 1991, he has been the director of Yonsei University's International Health Care Center at Severance Hospital.

Ihn has come under some scrutiny for various public statements he has made. He has claimed the disease AIDS is a result of not following the Bible, and claimed that impeached president Yoon Suk Yeol's declaration of martial law was "'extreme', but not entirely unjustified".

== Early life and education ==
Ihn was born in Jeonju, South Korea, as the youngest of six children. He spent his early years in his hometown of Suncheon. Ihn's family has been in Jeolla for several generations; in 1895, his great-grandfather Eugene Bell came to the province as a Southern Presbyterian missionary. His grandfather William Alderman Linton participated in the March First Movement in 1919. Ihn's parents also performed missionary work, and established a number of churches and schools in Korea. During the colonization of Korea by Japan, they were deported to the United States in 1940, where his father joined the United States Navy and fought against Japan during World War II. Ihn's father later served in the Korean War.

Ihn grew up in a missionary compound in Suncheon. He grew up speaking a mix of Korean and English; his Korean has been described as having a heavy Jeolla accent. He attended the Taejon Christian International School as a teenager.

In 1980, Ihn was a first-year medical student at Yonsei University when the Gwangju Uprising occurred. Ihn went from Seoul to Gwangju, and worked as a translator for foreign reporters. Within two weeks, he was summoned to the US Embassy with regards to a letter that described him as an instigator of the uprising. For years afterwards, he was carefully observed by the South Korean government. He returned to school and became the first Westerner to pass the Korean Medical Licensing Examination.

== Career ==
=== Medical career ===
In 1991, he became the youngest director in history of Yonsei University's International Health Care Center. The following year, he helped introduce the first ambulances in South Korea. Before the introduction of ambulances, patients were transported in taxi-like cars. Ihn was, in part, motivated to address this issue because of his own experience; his father had died in such a car in 1984, after being hit by a drunk driver. In 1993, he trained the country's first paramedic prehospital care team in his hometown of Suncheon. In 1995, he contributed to the development of an enhanced ambulance.

Beginning in 1997, he began making medical aid trips to North Korea. As of 2018, he has since made 29 trips to the country.

In 2017, he treated Oh Chong-song, a North Korean soldier who defected to the South via the Korean Demilitarized Zone.

=== Political career ===
Ihn has become a public figure in South Korea. He met Kim Dae-jung in 1994 (who later became president), and served as vice chairman of president elect Park Geun-hye's transition committee in 2012.

Ihn is a Korean reunification activist, and has expressed support for providing further aid to North Korea.

According to Ihn, he adopted a "moderate conservative" stance after Yoon Suk Yeol sought his assistance following his win of the People Power Party (PPP) primary. On October 23, 2023, he was appointed as an Innovation Chairman of the PPP, which had become the ruling party in the 2022 elections alongside Yoon's victory in the presidential race. He ran in the 2024 South Korean legislative election as a candidate of People Future Party, a bloc party of People Power Party. In a shock victory, Ihn placed eighth on the party's list, winning him a seat in the National Assembly.

In 2024, after president Yoon declared martial law, Ihn voted against impeaching Yoon. A political ally of Yoon, Ihn claimed that his declaration of martial law was "'extreme' but not entirely unjustified".

Ihn has sparked controversy over certain comments he has made in the past, such as claiming that AIDS arises from not following the Bible. He has also expressed support for controversial politicians Park Chung Hee and Paik Sun-yup. He also claimed the National Health Insurance Service possessed "socialist proclivities" and proposed adding an additional layer of private insurance, which was criticized by some healthcare providers.

On July 22, 2025, Ihn expressed approval of far-right figure Jeon Han-gil's entrance into the PPP. He said that Jeon added diversity to the party.

He resigned from his seat in the National Assembly, criticizing South Korean politics as being trapped in factionalism on January 9, 2026.

After stepping down, he expressed disappointment over martial law and said he would return to his medical career.

== Other activities ==
Ihn published an autobiography in 2006, entitled My Hometown is Jeolla-do, My Soul is Korean (내 고향은 전라도 내 영혼은 한국인). In 2019, Ihn appeared on an episode of the variety show Master in the House.

In 2014, Ihn was awarded the Order of Service Merit of Human Rights Award.

== Personal life ==
Ihn has since become the progenitor of a Korean clan: the Suncheon Ihn clan.

In 2012, Ihn received South Korean citizenship; he was the first adult to do so under a new law that permitted him to retain his American citizenship.
