= Park Duk-hyum =

South Korean politician

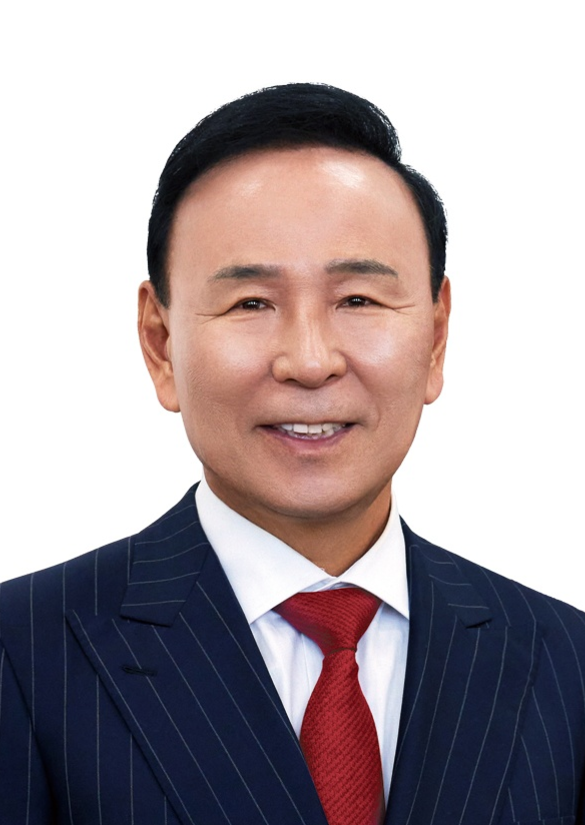
- Park in 2024

Deputy Speaker of the National Assembly
- Incumbent
- Assumed office 5 June 2026 Serving with Nam In-soon
- Speaker: Cho Jeong-sik
- Preceded by: Joo Ho-young

Member of the National Assembly
- Incumbent
- Assumed office 30 May 2012
- Preceded by: Lee Yong-hee
- Constituency: Boeun–Okchen–Yeongdong (North Chungcheong, 2012–2016); Boeun–Okchen–Yeongdong–Goesan (North Chungcheong, 2016–)

Personal details
- Party: People Power

Korean name
- Hangul: 박덕흠
- Hanja: 朴德欽
- RR: Bak Deokheum
- MR: Pak Tŏkhŭm

Park Duk-hyum (Korean: 박덕흠) is a South Korean politician. Park was elected Deputy Speaker of the National Assembly on 5 June 2026. On 8 May 2026, Park became the People Power Party's candidate for Deputy Speaker. In September 2020, Park left the People Power Party after corruption allegations because his family's company's contracts were audited by the land committee, which he was part of.

== Election results ==
Year	Elections	Constituency	Political party	Votes (%)	Results
2012	19th National Assembly General Election	Boeun–Okchen–Yeongdong (North Chungcheong)	Saenuri	30,196 (40.67%)	Won
2016	20th National Assembly General Election	Boeun–Okchen–Yeongdong–Goesan (North Chungcheong)	Saenuri	51,723 (56.68%)	Won
2020	21st National Assembly General Election	Boeun–Okchen–Yeongdong–Goesan (North Chungcheong)	UFP	58,490 (56.88%)	Won
2024	22nd National Assembly General Election	Boeun–Okchen–Yeongdong–Goesan (North Chungcheong)	PPP	55,234 (52.93%)	Won
