= Stephen Winn Linton =

American activist (born 1950)

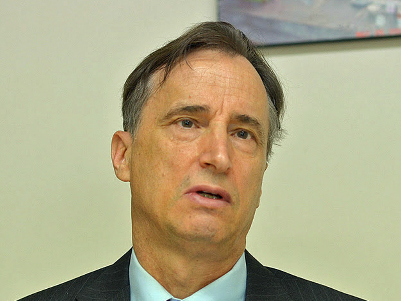

Dr. Stephen Linton (born 1950) is an American humanitarian and an expert on the Democratic People's Republic of Korea (North Korea). He has visited North Korea over 80 times since 1979 and twice met the country's late president, Kim Il Sung, as an advisor and translator to the Rev. Billy Graham.

He is also the founder and chairman of the Eugene Bell Foundation, which provides medical humanitarian assistance to rural North Korea. Focusing on multi-drug-resistant tuberculosis, the foundation currently sponsors 12 medical centers serving patients in half of the country.

Currently an affiliated scholar at Harvard University's Korea Institute, Linton was raised in a rural area of Jeollanam-do, South Korea, as the son of a prominent family of missionaries to Korea. His father, Hugh Linton, established over 200 churches in rural Korea and his mother, Betty Linton, served 40 years as director of the Soonchun Christian Tuberculosis Rehabilitation Center. His brother, John Alderman Linton, is the director of International Healthcare Center of Yonsei University in Seoul.

== Education ==
- BA (philosophy), Yonsei University, Westminster Theological Seminary,
- MA Columbia University,
- PhD Columbia University
