= Lee Hae-min (politician) =

AI Future Planning Senior Secretary since 2026

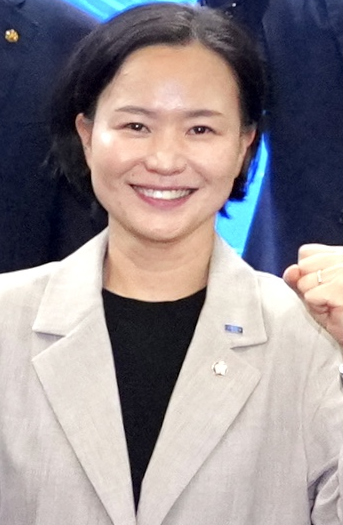
- Lee in 2024

AI Future Planning Senior Secretary
- Incumbent
- Assumed office August 30, 2026
- President: Lee Jae-myung
- Prime Minister: Han Seong-sook
- Preceded by: Ha Jung-woo

Member of the National Assembly
- In office June 5, 2024 – August 30, 2026
- Constituency: Proportional representation

Personal details
- Born: July 2, 1973 (age 53)
- Citizenship: South Korea
- Party: Independent (2026–present)
- Other political affiliations: Rebuilding Korea Party (2024–2026)
- Education: Master of Computer Engineering, Sogang University Graduate School
- Occupation: Businesswoman, politician

Korean name
- Hangul: 이해민
- Hanja: 李海珉
- RR: I Haemin
- MR: I Haemin

Lee Hae-min (Korean: 이해민; born July 2, 1973) is a South Korean computer engineer and politician serving as the AI Future Planning Senior Secretary in the Lee Jae-myung administration. She previously served as a proportional representation member of the 22nd National Assembly. Before entering politics she worked at Google when she was recruited by the Rebuilding Korea Party on 4 March 2024. She was subsequently given proportional representation number three and was elected to the 22nd National Assembly.

== Education ==
- Bachelor’s degree in Computer Science, College of Engineering, Sogang University
- Master’s degree in Computer Engineering, Graduate School of Sogang University

== History ==
- Product Manager, Google Korea April 2007 – August 2022
- August 2022 – February 2024 Chief Product Officer, Open Survey
- 10 April 2024 elected a member of the National Assembly
- Chairperson, Public Relations Committee, Rebuilding Korea
- Party Chairperson, Women's Committee, Rebuilding Korea Party
- December 2024 – March 2025: Senior Vice-Chairperson, Policy Committee, Rebuilding Korea Party
- February 2025 – August 2026: Chairperson, Special Committee on Science & Technology Innovation, Rebuilding Korea Party
- February 2025 – August 2026: Chairperson, Special Committee on AI, Rebuilding Korea Party
- March 2025 – September 2025: Supreme Council Member, Rebuilding Korea Party
- Chairperson, Subcommittee on Court Reform, Rebuilding Korea
- Party Chairperson, Seongnam City Regional Committee (Gyeonggi Province), Rebuilding Korea Party
- November 2025 – July 2026: Secretary-General, Rebuilding Korea Party
- August 2026 – present: Senior Secretary for AI Future Planning, Office of the President

=== Legislative activities ===
- May 2024 – August 2026: Member of the 22nd National Assembly (Proportional Representation, Rebuilding Korea Party, First-term)
  - June 2024 – May 2026: Member, Science, ICT, Broadcasting and Communications Committee (First Half of the 22nd National Assembly)
  - June 2026 – August 2026: Member, National Policy Committee (Second Half of the 22nd National Assembly)

== Electoral history ==
Year	Election	Assembly	Position	Constituency	Party	Votes	Vote share	Rank	Result	Notes
2024	General election	22nd	Member of the National Assembly	Proportional representation	Rebuilding Korea Party	6,874,278	24.25%	3rd on the proportional representation list	Elected	First-term member

== Political affiliation ==
Party	Period	Notes
Rebuilding Korea Party	2024–2026	Founding member
Independent	2026–present	Withdrawal from the party upon assuming public office. (Note: Withdrawal from the Rebuilding Korea Party upon assuming public office.)

== See also ==
- Rebuilding Korea members of the 22nd National Assembly
