= Kim Mi-ae =

South Korean politician (born 1969)

- 김미애
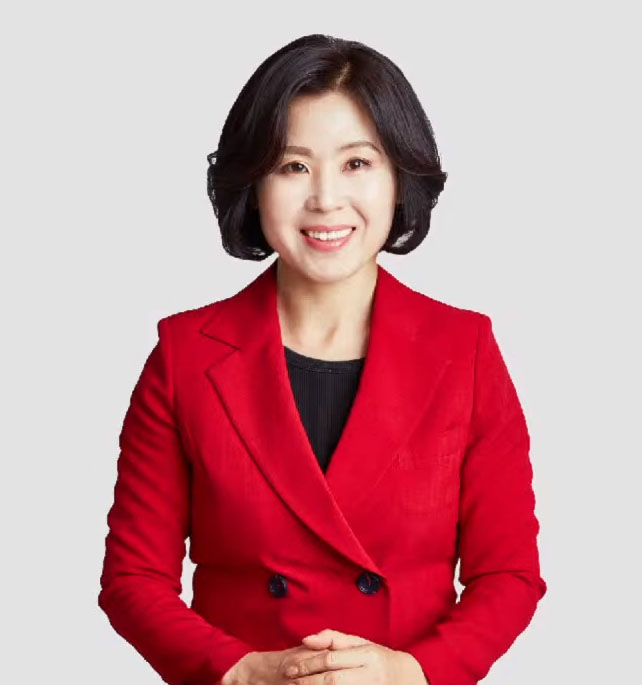

Member of the National Assembly of the Republic of Korea

Personal details
- Born: October 6, 1969 (age 56) Pohang
- Party: United Future Party
- Occupation: Politician, lawyer
- Website: Congresswoman Kim Mi-Ae's website

Kim Mi-ae (Korean: 김미애; October 6, 1969) is a South Korean lawyer and politician. She served as a member of the 21st National Assembly and is affiliated with the People's Power Party.

== Biography ==
Kim was born in a small fishing village in Hajeong 1-ri, Guryongpo-eup, Yeongil-gun, North Gyeongsang Province (now Pohang), South Korea, the daughter of a fishermen couple from Udo-myeon, Bukjeju-gun, Jeju-do (now Jeju City, Jeju Special Self-Governing Province). When she was in the fifth grade, she learned that her mother had succumbed to cancer, and she worked as Haenyeo, catching balanidae and mussel for her mother, who loved seafood. Kim was 15 when she learned that her mother had died after a four-year battle with the disease, and she studied by picking up other people's discarded reference books and problem sets and reworking them.

Shortly after enrolling in Pohang Girls' High School, Kim dropped out due to difficult family circumstances, and at the age of 17, she worked as a laborer at Taekwang Group's textile factory in Banyeodong, Haeundae District, Busan (now Busan). At the time, the factory was notorious for its harsh working conditions, with three eight-hour shifts (6 a.m. to 2 pm, 2 p.m. to 10 pm, and 10 p.m. to 6 am) In her early 20s, Kim taught herself Japanese, then got a job at a general merchandise store near a hotel in Haeundae District, and in 1994, she opened a sushi restaurant. However, she sold the sushi shop less than a year later, and in 1996, she took the College Scholastic Ability Test (CSAT).

Kim enrolled in the night class at Dong-a University School of Law in 1997 and received her bachelor's degree in law in 2001. In 2002, she passed the 44th bar exam, completing the 34th course of the Judicial Training Institute. She worked as an attorney at Kim & Kim from February 2005 to January 2017. Kim has worked primarily in the areas of women's, children's, and human rights, advocating on behalf of marginalized groups, including single mothers, adopted children, foster children, women victims of domestic violence, and women victims of sexual assault. She also founded the Busan District Bar Association's Me Too Movement Legal Support Group for women victims of sexual assault. In February 2017, she founded Hanol, a law firm composed of female attorneys.

Kim joined the Liberty Korea Party in October 2018 through Member of Parliament Kim Se-yeon, who was serving as the chairman of the Busan Party of the Liberty Korea Party, and in January 2019, she was appointed as the chairwoman of the Busan Haeundae district of the Liberty Korea Party. Kim Mi-ae ran as a candidate for the Busan Haeundae district of the United Future Party in the 21st parliamentary election of the Republic of Korea held on April 15, 2020, and won, defeating Yoon Jun-ho of the Democratic Party of Korea.

Kim Mi-ae is a Protestant and has served as a deacon at Suyeongro Church in Busan. She is also a single mom who has adopted three children.
