= Yoo Yeongha =

South Korean politician

Member of the National Assembly
- Incumbent
- Assumed office 30 May 2024
- Preceded by: Hong Seok-jun
- Constituency: Dalseo A (Daegu)

Personal details
- Party: People Power

Korean name
- Hangul: 유영하
- RR: Yu Yeongha
- MR: Yu Yŏngha

Yoo Yeongha (Korean: 유영하) is a South Korean politician. Yoo is a member of the National Assembly. When he was nominated to run for a single candidacy by the People Power Party, Yoo was criticized by Hong Seok-joon. At the time, Hong called for a primary to determine who would run for the National Assembly seat. Yoo was formerly an aide of President Park Geun-hye. He ran in the 2026 Daegu mayoral primary.

Yoo was seen drawing a gorilla during the October 27, 2025, National Assembly audit of the Financial Services Commission. Prior to the audit, Yoo criticized the current administration for their real estate policies. Yoo later apologized for drawing the gorilla, stating that drawing was a method for him to relieve stress.

== Election results ==
=== General elections ===
Year	Elections	Constituency	Political party	Votes (%)	Results
2004	17th National Assembly General Election	Gunpo (Gyeonggi)	GNP	44,609 (35.99%)	Defeated (2nd)
2008	18th National Assembly General Election	Gunpo (Gyeonggi)	GNP	45,999 (47.09%)	Defeated (2nd)
2012	19th National Assembly General Election	Gunpo (Gyeonggi)	Saenuri	62,132 (48.67%)	Defeated (2nd)
2024	22nd National Assembly General Election	Dalseo A (Daegu)	PPP	60,070 (71.39%)	Won
