= Edwin Linton =

American biologist

Edwin Linton (March 14, 1855, in East Bethlehem, Pennsylvania – 1939) was an American biologist noted for his research in the field of helminthology, the study of worms, especially parasitic worms in fishes. Linton was a research fellow in biology at the University of Pennsylvania and professor emeritus at Washington and Jefferson College. The New York Times called Linton "one of the world's leading authorities on helminthology." Linton received his doctorate from Yale University. He was awarded the 1937 Leidy Award from the Academy of Natural Sciences of Philadelphia.
