= Cho Jeong-sik =

South Korean politician (born 1963)

The Right Honourable Cho Jeong-sik
- 조정식
- Cho in 2026

Speaker of the National Assembly
- Incumbent
- Assumed office 5 June 2026
- Deputy: Nam In-soon; Park Duk-hyum
- Preceded by: Woo Won-shik

Member of the National Assembly
- Incumbent
- Assumed office 30 May 2004
- Preceded by: Park Byeong-yun (Siheung, Gyeonggi)
- Constituency: Siheung B (Gyeonggi)

Special Advisor for Political Affairs to the President
- In office 28 December 2025 – 3 May 2026
- President: Lee Jae Myung
- Prime Minister: Kim Min-seok

Secretary-General of the Democratic Party
- In office 31 August 2022 – 21 April 2024
- Preceded by: Kim Min-ki
- Succeeded by: Kim Yoon-deok

Secretary-General of the New Politics Alliance for Democracy
- In office 4 August 2014 – 8 February 2015
- Preceded by: Joo Seung-yong
- Succeeded by: Yang Seung-jo

Personal details
- Born: 25 December 1963 (age 62) Jung, Seoul, South Korea
- Party: Independent (2026–present)
- Other political affiliations: See list: Democratic (1990) (1990–1991); Democratic (1991) (1991–1995); UDP (1995) (1995–1996); Democratic (1995) (1996–1997); Grand National Party (1997–2003); Independent (2003); Uri (2003–2007); GUDNP (2007–2008); UDP (2008) (2008); Democratic (2008) (2008–2011); DUP (2011–2013); Democratic (2013) (2013–2014); NPAD (2014–2015); Democratic (2015) (2015–2026)
- Education: Yonsei University (B.Arch., MPA)

Korean name
- Hangul: 조정식
- Hanja: 趙正湜
- RR: Jo Jeongsik
- MR: Cho Chŏngsik

Cho Jeong-sik (Korean: 조정식; born December 25, 1963) is a South Korean politician. He is a member of and the current Speaker of the National Assembly of the Republic of Korea.

On 13 May 2026, Cho was elected by the Democratic Party's ruling party lawmakers and dues-paying party members as nominee to be Speaker of the National Assembly, replacing Woo Won-shik. On 5 June 2026, Cho was elected by the National Assembly as Speaker.

== Career ==
=== Before entering politics ===
Born in Seoul, 1963, Cho Jeong-sik graduated from Dongsung High School and Yonsei University with an architecture degree. His activism during college years was limited. While he joined an activist-related group, his involvement primarily consisted of attending meetings and reading materials. In 1985, he led a rally but faced potential repercussions such as arrest upon joining the military afterwards. This resulted in him prioritizing graduating on time, a decision reportedly encouraged by his father. For this reason, some classify him as a non-activist figure.

Following his graduation, Cho Jung-sik pursued a new direction in his career. He transitioned from student activities to working anonymously as a pressman in the labor movement. After four years in this role, Cho Jung-sik's political involvement deepened in 1990. With the announcement of a three-party merger featuring the Reunification Democratic Party (RDP), the ruling Democratic Justice Party (DJP) and New Democratic Republican Party (NDRP) on 22 January 1990 to form the Democratic Liberal Party, he joined the RDP dissidents into the remaining opposition force, the Little Democrats, as a professional committee member.

=== Entering politics ===
Je Jeong-gu, who was respected socially as a godfather of the poor movement while advocating clean politics in the 14th general elections, was elected by running for the Siheung-Gunpo region on the Democratic Party's ticket. Cho Jung-sik began his full-fledged political career, serving as an aide to the lawmaker Je Jeong-gu. Following the party split, he continued his political journey with Je Jeong-gu, and when United Democratic Party was divided into two groups in the 1997 presidential election process, he again moved to the Grand National Party along with Je Jeong-gu.

After Je Jeong-gu's death in 1999, he also served as an aide to Lee Bu-young, who moved from the United Democratic Party to the Grand National Party. In the 16th presidential election in 2002, he served as a special aide to Lee Hoi-Chang. However, he left the GNP in 2003 following Lee Bu-young and joined the Uri Party, completely settling down with the current DP party.

=== Political career ===
He was elected as a candidate for the 17th National Assembly in 2004 by running for the Uri Party in the Eul district of Siheung, Gyeonggi Province, followed by the United Democratic Party in the 18th National Assembly election in 2008, the Democratic United Party in the 19th National Assembly election in 2012, the Democratic Party of Korea in the 20th National Assembly election in 2016, and the same constituency in 2020.

After being elected for the first time, he served as vice chairman of the Uri Party's education and training committee and as a member and spokesman of the Uri Party's first-term group of lawmakers. Although it was initially classified as a pro-Roh faction, it is often classified as a faction of Sohn Hak-kyu, as he showed a favorable attitude toward Sohn in the process of disbanding the Uri Party. When he was a second-term lawmaker, he served as floor spokesman, vice floor leader and chairman of the Gyeonggi Provincial Party. He served as secretary-general of the main opposition New Politics Alliance for Democracy from August 2014 to February 2015, when he served as a three-term lawmaker.

Negotiation and coordination have been recognized, but there is an assessment that something on its own is a bit disappointing. However, in the case of lawmakers who have a lot of players, but are not very noticeable, the majority of lawmakers are faithful to the management of their constituencies, which is why they are supported by residents. It can be seen from the fact that about 50 out of 300 lawmakers are on the big news. He, however, may also be conscious, but he is said to be aiming for the post of chairman of the standing committee in the 20th National And he became the chairman of the Land, Infrastructure and Transport Committee in the first half of the 20th National Assembly, as he had hoped. A series of favorable reviews have been made that his undergraduate major is architecture and the Land, Infrastructure and Transport Committee, which serves as the chairman of the standing committee, is closely related to his major, making a good choice. It's the prime standing committee that everyone is looking for. This is because if the SOC (Social Overhead Capital) is elected and belongs to the Land, Infrastructure and Transport Committee, it will be easier to implement its pledges through budget allocation using its standing member status, which will be advantageous for the next election. In addition, the so-called chairman, secretary or standing committee chairman can exert influence with a simple instruction.

On November 15, 2017, the Framework Act on Sustainable Infrastructure Management was proposed, and the bill was revised and implemented on January 1, 2020.

On January 21, 2019, he was appointed chief policymaker of the main opposition Minjoo Party of Korea.

On July 11, regarding Japan's economic retaliation, he responded to remarks made at a forum of the Korea Economic Research Institute under the Federation of Korean Industries that "the cause of political and diplomatic failures" and "the show-off response," calling them "ridiculous remarks" and "regretful for disparaging the government's efforts and passing the buck to the Korean government at a Korean government."

In the 21st general elections, he was registered as a preliminary candidate, and won the fifth term with 69,720 votes and 67.0 percent of the votes, being the highest number of votes among the elected candidates in the Seoul metropolitan area.

In the 21st National Assembly, he is said to be interested in floor leader rather than vice speaker of the National Assembly.

=== 22nd National Assembly ===
Cho was re-elected in the 22nd National Assembly election in 2024. Belonging to the Lee Jae Myung faction of the Democratic Party, President Lee Jae Myung appointed Cho as Special Advisor for Political Affairs to the President in December 2025, serving until May 2026, to run for the position of Speaker of the National Assembly.

=== Speaker of the National Assembly ===
On 13 May 2026, Cho was elected by the Democratic Party's ruling party lawmakers and dues-paying party members as nominee to be Speaker of the National Assembly, replacing Woo Won-shik. Cho won the vote over Reps. Kim Tae-nyeon and Park Jie-won. Cho then elected by the National Assembly on 5 June 2026 with 267 of 276 votes case in a plenary session.

Cho pledged to “complete constitutional revision” by launching a special committee immediately if elected as Speaker, supporting a four-year presidential term with one consecutive re-election and to strengthen the National Assembly's authority by transferring the Board of Audit and Inspection, from the president under the Constitution, to the Assembly.

== Police records ==
- Violation of Road Traffic Act (Denial of Drinking): 1.5 million won fine (July 5, 2000)

== Electoral history ==
| Election | Year | Position | Party Affiliation | Votes | Percentage of votes | Results |
|---|---|---|---|---|---|---|
| 17th General Election | 2004 | Gyeonggi Siheung B | Uri Party | 34,469 | 59.44% | Won |
| 18th General Election | 2008 | Gyeonggi Siheung B | United Democratic Party | 23,313 | 51.13% | Won |
| 19th General Election | 2012 | Gyeonggi Siheung B | Democratic United Party | 34,596 | 59.62% | Won |
| 20th General Election | 2016 | Gyeonggi Siheung B | Democratic Party of Korea | 33,780 | 47.03% | Won |
| 21st General Election | 2020 | Gyeonggi Siheung B | Democratic Party of Korea | 69,720 | 67.02% | Won |
| 22nd General Election | 2024 | Gyeonggi Siheung B | Democratic Party of Korea | 71,207 | 56.53% | Won |

Political offices
| Preceded by Park Byeong-yun (Siheung, Gyeonggi) | Member of the National Assembly for Siheung B (Gyeonggi); 30 May 2004–present | Incumbent |
| Preceded by Woo Won-shik | Speaker of the National Assembly of South Korea; 5 June 2026–present | Incumbent |
