= Nam In-soon =

South Korean politician

- 남인순
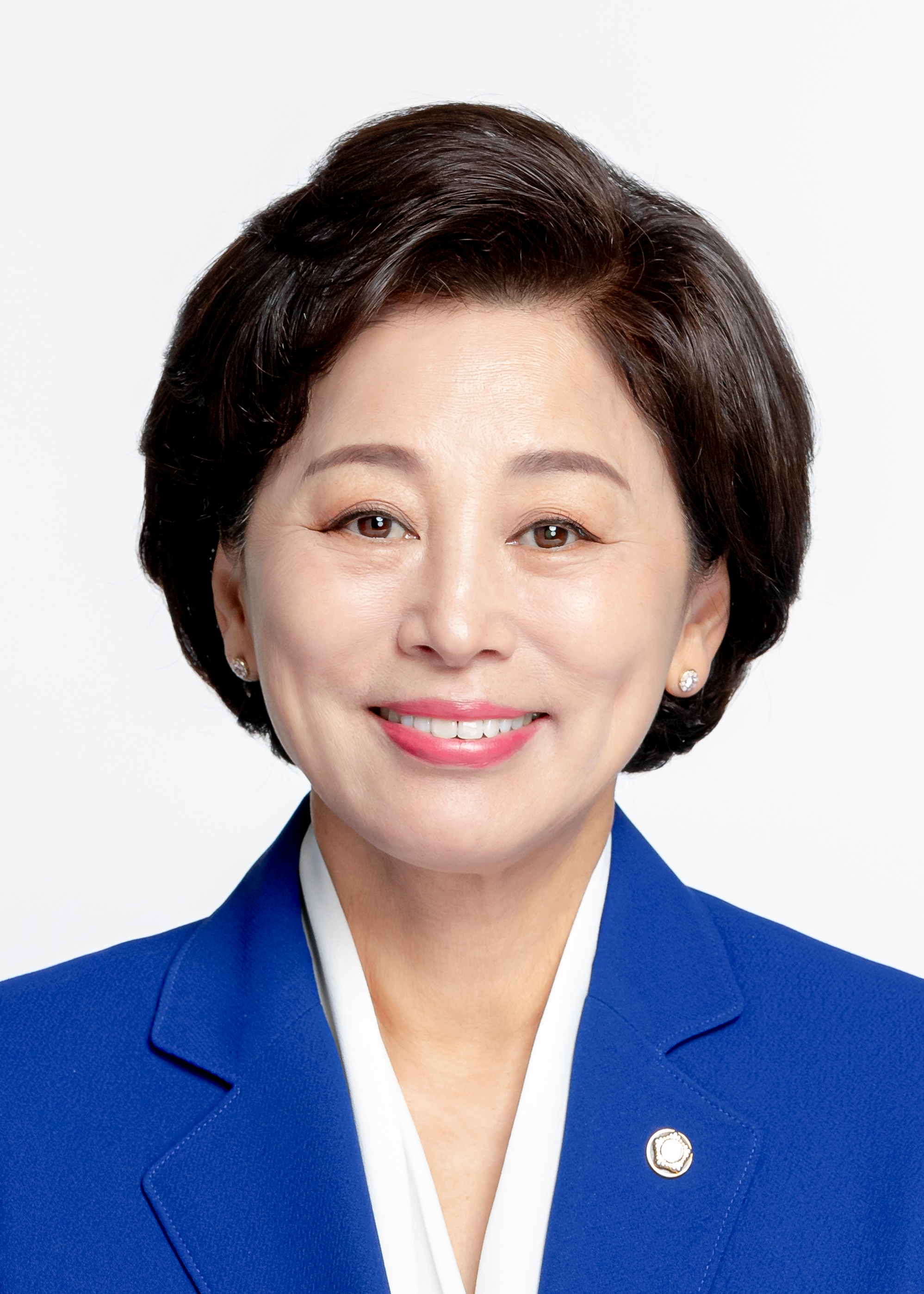
- Nam in 2018

Deputy Speaker of the National Assembly
- Incumbent
- Assumed office 5 June 2026 Serving with Park Duk-hyum
- Speaker: Cho Jeong-sik
- Preceded by: Lee Hack-young

Member of the National Assembly
- Incumbent
- Assumed office 30 May 2016
- Preceded by: Kim Eul-dong
- Constituency: Seoul Songpa C
- In office 30 May 2012 – 29 May 2016
- Constituency: Proportional

Personal details
- Born: 5 November 1958 (age 67) Incheon, South Korea
- Party: Democratic
- Other political affiliations: Democratic Unionist Party (2011–2013); Democratic Party (2013–2014); New Politics Alliance for Democracy (2014–2015)
- Spouse: Seo Joo-won
- Children: Seo Ha-nui
- Education: Sejong University; Anglican Church University
- Occupation: Activist, politician

Nam In-soon (Korean: 남인순; born 5 November 1958) is a South Korean feminist activist and politician, currently a member of National Assembly representing Songpa C constituency. In August 2018, she was elected as one of the Vice Presidents of Democratic Party of Korea.

Known for her feminist activism in South Korea, Nam began her involvement in the feminist cause during the late 1980s. She has been a member of the National Assembly since 2012. She also served as a Vice President of the Democratic Unionist Party and deputy parliamentary leader of New Politics Alliance for Democracy, parties which were predecessors of the Democratic Party.

== Early life ==
Born in Incheon, Nam attended for Songlim Primary School, Soongduck Women Secondary School, and Inil Women High School. She studied Korean at Capital Women College of Education (currently Sejong University) in the late 1970s. During this time, her dream career changed from a Korean lecturer to a labour activist after she saw the suppression of women's trade unions. She joined a protest against the university's management, after which her education was suspended. For a while, she learned to sew and temporarily worked at a factory before she was readmitted to university, finally earning her bachelor's degree. She also earned a master's degree in Social Welfare from Anglican Church University in Seoul.

== Activist career ==
Nam began her activist career in the Korean labour and feminist movement in 1988, when she joined and became the assistant administrator for the House of Sharing for Working Women in Incheon. Then, she became a co-founder of the Women Labour Committee of Incheon and served as the secretary-general and vice president. Since 1994, she has also held the roles of secretary-general and executive director in Korean Women's Associations United, where she worked for 17 years.

As a feminist activist, she contributed to various establishments, including the enactment of Anti-Domestic Violence Act and Anti-Prostitution Act, amendment of Infant Care Act and Maternity Protection Act, introduction of gender quota system, establishment of Ministry of Women, and the abolition of patriarchal family system. Organizations that she has worked for include: Citizens' Solidarity for General Election, Solidarity Congress of Civil Society Organisations, Seoul Metropolitan Government, The Ombudsman of Korea, the Supreme Court of South Korea, National Human Rights Commission, Korean Broadcasting System (KBS), and the Ministry of Women.

== Political career ==
=== 19th Parliament (2012–2016) ===
Nam began her political involvement in 2011, while she was a Co-President of Innovation and Unity. The organisation then merged with the Democratic Party and reorganised as the Democratic Unionist Party (DUP; then Democratic Party), therefore she automatically became a member of the newly formed DUP. Before the election, she briefly served as one of the party's Vice Presidents. In 2012 election, she ran 9th in the DUP list and was elected for the National Assembly.

As a member of the Assembly, Nam was a member of several parliamentary committees, such as the Committee of Women and Family, the Health and Welfare Committee (including Subcommittee for Improvement of Childcare Services), and the Special Committee on Budget and Accounts. She was also a co-leader of the Gender Equality Policy Research Forum and the Civil Politics Forum within the National Assembly. Outside of parliament, she also held party positions within Democratic Party and its successors, the New Politics Alliance for Democracy (NPAD) and the Democratic Party of Korea. The positions include the President of Foreign Cooperation Committee, National Women Committee, and Special Committee on Childcare. She was also the deputy parliamentary leader of NPAD from May 2014 to 2015.

Nam was also a member of the Special Committee for the Enhancement of Military Human Rights and Army Life in the National Assembly from October 2014 to July 2015. As a committee member, she contributed to enrich human rights of soldiers including the prohibition of sexual harassment and the improvement of medical treatment system within military camps. Before this, she was also the President of Committee for Fact Finding and System Improvement of Lee Seo-hyun Incident.

=== 20th Parliament (2016-present) ===
In 2016 election, Nam ran for the Songpa District 3rd constituency. She received 44.88% and narrowly defeated the incumbent, Kim Eul-dong of Saenuri Party (then Liberty Korea Party). After the opening of the 20th Parliament, she was elected as the President of Committee of Women and Family, but also worked for Health and Welfare Committee, and Special Committee on Budget and Accounts.

During the presidential election in 2017, Nam was appointed as the women chief for the Democratic presidential candidate Moon Jae-in. After Moon was elected and inaugurated as the President, she was one of the possible figure to be the Minister of Women and Family, although Chung Hyun-back was actually selected for the position.

Nam ran as a vice presidential candidate for the Democratic Party leadership election in 2018. She received 8.42% and came to 6th, just behind of Park Jung. As the party has 5 Vice Presidents, she couldn't actually be elected for the position. However, according to the party constitution, since no female was within the top 5, Nam was subsequently elected, instead of Park.

== Personal life ==
Nam is married to Seo Joo-won, who is the President of Sudokwon Landfill Site Management Corporation. They have a daughter named Seo Ha-nui.

Nam used an unofficial name, Nam Yoon In-soon (Korean: 남윤인순), for her activist career. This was a part of double-barrelled name (similar to Spanish naming customs) campaign from the late 1990s, but she also used this name during the 2012 election. She reverted to her original name in 2015, because of systems issues and to relate more closely to people.

== Electoral history ==
Election	Year	District	Party affiliation	Votes	Percentage of votes	Results
19th National Assembly General Election	2012	Proportional Representation (9th)	Democratic United Party	7,777,123	36.45%	Elected
20th National Assembly General Election	2016	Seoul Songpa C	Democratic Party	56,772	44.88%	Won
21st National Assembly General Election	2020	Seoul Songpa C	Democratic Party	78,789	52.49%	Won
22nd National Assembly General Election	2024	Seoul Songpa C	Democratic Party	80,358	51.04%	Won
