= Eugene Bell Foundation =

U.S.-based nonprofit organization

- Formation: 1995; 31 years ago
- Founder: Stephen Winn Linton
- Type: NGO
- Legal status: Foundation
- Purpose: Humanitarian assistance in North Korea
- Headquarters: Washington, D.C.
- Website: www.eugene-bell.org

The Eugene Bell Foundation is a U.S.-based foundation that provides medical humanitarian assistance to rural North Korea. Focusing on multidrug-resistant tuberculosis, the foundation currently sponsors 12 treatment centers, drawing patients from the western half of North Korea. The foundation primarily offers material support and medical expertise to North Korean medical staff and facilities in North Korea. The foundation is primarily financed through South Koreans and ethnic Koreans abroad. According to the foundation's home-page, "Eugene Bell USA is a not-for-profit 501(c)(3) organization established in 1995 by Dr. Stephen Winn Linton".

== History ==
Stephen Linton founded the Eugene Bell Centennial Foundation in 1995 to provide teaching and research to North Korea. The foundation was named in honor of the 100th anniversary of the arrival of Eugene Bell, his ancestor, to Korea as a missionary.

From 1996 to 1998, the foundation provided grain and other food aid to North Koreans. At the request of the North Korean government, the foundation began to focus on medical aid in 1998, spending the next ten years setting up a monitored supply chain that provided diagnostic and operating room assistance to medical facilities across North Korea.

By 2008, drug-resistant tuberculosis, in particular multidrug-resistant tuberculosis, had emerged as a significant and untreated threat, prompting the North Korean government to invite Eugene Bell to aid patients with the disease. As of 2014, the Eugene Bell Foundation is providing aid to 12 treatment centers in the form of medicine, diagnostic equipment, and treatment consultation.

In 2013, 885 patients received care at Eugene Bell-supported multidrug-resistant tuberculosis treatment centers, a number expected to rise to 1,500 by the end of 2014.

== Treating patients in North Korea ==
The Foundation has developed a unique medical aid model, which combines regular visits by American personnel with daily treatment by North Korean health professionals., Every six months, Eugene Bell senior staff and volunteers visit each of the 12 centers receiving medical aid to gather samples from each patient and monitor progress. North Korean patients are currently receiving treatment through the Eugene Bell Foundation at centers in North P'yongan Province, South P'yongan Province, Pyongyang, North Hwanghae Province, South Hwanghae Province, and Kaesong.

The medical director of the Eugene Bell Foundation, Dr. KJ Seung, published the Foundation's findings about the extent of multidrug-resistant tuberculosis in 2013. The study indicates that incidence of drug resistance is much higher than previously known and recommended a rapid expansion in international aid.

== Relationship with the North Korean government ==
The Eugene Bell Foundation works closely with the North Korean Ministry of Health and relies on local North Korean nurses and doctors to provide care at treatment centers.
