= Sejong City Council =

City council in South Korea

Sejong Special Self-Governing City Council 세종특별자치시의회
- 4th Sejong Special Self-Governing City Council

Type
- Type: Unicameral

History
- Founded: 1 July 2012

Leadership
- Chairman: Sang Byeong-heon, Democratic
- Vice Chairman: Park Ran-hee, Democratic
- Vice Chairman: Kim Hak-seo, People Power Party

Structure
- Seats: 20
- Political groups: Democratic (13) People Power (7)
- Length of term: 4 years

Elections
- Voting system: Parallel voting: First-past-the-post (16 seats); Party-list proportional representation (2 seats)
- Last election: 1 June 2022

Website
- Sejong City Council (Korean); Sejong City Council (English)

- Sejong City Council
- Hangul: 세종특별자치시의회
- Hanja: 世宗特別自治市議會
- RR: Sejong-teukbyeoljachisi uihoe
- MR: Sejong-t'ŭkpyŏljach'isi ŭihoe

The Sejong City Council, officially the Sejong Special Self-Governing City Council (Korean: 세종특별자치시의회) is the local council of Sejong City, South Korea.

There are a total of 18 members, with 16 members elected in the First-past-the-post voting system and 2 members elected in Party-list proportional representation.

== Current composition ==
Political party	Seats
Democratic	13
People Power	7
Total	20

== Organization ==
The structure of Council consists of:

- Chairman
- Two Vice-chairmen
- Standing Committees
  - Steering Committee of Council
  - Administration and Welfare Committee
  - Industry and Construction Committee
  - Education Committee
- Special Committees
  - Special Committees on Budget and Accounts
  - Special Committees on Ethics

== Recent election results ==
=== 2018 ===
Summary of the 13 June 2018 Sejong City Council election results
Party	Constituency				Party list				Total seats	
Party	Votes	%	Seats	±	Votes	%	Seats	±	Seats	±
Democratic Party of Korea	85,299	62.97	16	▲8	79,752	59.01	1	0	17	▲8
Liberty Korea Party	22,513	16.62	0	▼4	23,567	17.43	1	0	1	▼4
Justice Party	—				17,369	12.85	0	new	0	new
Bareunmirae Party	18,224	13.45	0	new	14,455	10.69	0	new	0	new
Independents	9,433	6.96	0	▼1	—				0	▼1
Total	135,469	100.00	16	–	135,143	100.00	2	–	18	–
