= Robert Ritchie Linton =

Scottish surgeon (1900–1979)

Robert Ritchie Linton (1900–1979) was a Scottish-born vascular surgeon.

== Early life and education ==
Born in Grangemouth, Scotland, Linton relocated to the Puget Sound area in Washington after his father, a physician wounded in the Boer War, sought a fresh start. He graduated summa cum laude from the University of Washington in 1921 and proceeded to attend Harvard Medical School, where he was inducted into the Alpha Omega Alpha honor society.

== Career ==
After completing medical school in 1925, Linton interned at Johns Hopkins Hospital and then undertook a surgical residency at Massachusetts General Hospital. It was there, in 1928, that he joined the hospital's newly formed Vascular Clinic. Litton's career coincided with the early development of vascular surgery, a field that saw significant advancements in the early 20th century, such as the first successful complete ligation of the aorta by Rudolph Matas in 1923.

By 1930, under the guidance of Edward Delos Churchill, then John Homans Professor of Surgery at Harvard, Linton deepened his involvement in vascular surgery, utilizing the hospital's animal laboratory for research. His work during this period contributed to the evolving techniques in vascular surgery, which were still gaining recognition, as evidenced by the limited coverage of this specialty in contemporary surgical texts, such as the 1932 Textbook of Surgery by John Homans, which dedicated only 32 pages to vascular procedures.

Linton was instrumental in advancing vascular surgery and made contributions to the understanding of portal hypertension, particularly in the selection of patients for portacaval shunts. His work was highlighted at the sixth annual meeting of the Society for Vascular Surgery, which he helped to establish. There, Linton presented data on the emergency treatment of massive bleeding from esophageal varices using a transthoracic approach. He also introduced a balloon with an intragastric component, later known as the "Linton balloon," which proved effective in controlling hemorrhage.

Linton held leadership roles in various surgical organizations, becoming president of the Society for Vascular Surgery in 1955 and of the Boston Surgical Society in 1960. His tenure was marked by a period of strong leadership in the vascular division at Massachusetts General Hospital.

In 1973, the same year he co-founded the New England Society for Vascular Surgery, Linton published the Atlas of Vascular Surgery, which featured 220 plates illustrating his extensive surgical experience. That year, he and his wife were seriously injured in a car accident, which significantly impacted his health. Although he continued to participate in surgical activities, his capacity for performing surgery was diminished. Linton died on July 21, 1979, after witnessing developments in the field of vascular surgery over his lifetime.
