= Kim Hee-jung (politician) =

South Korean politician

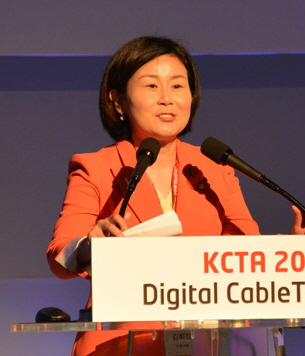
- Kim in 2013

Member of the National Assembly
- Incumbent
- Assumed office 2024
- In office 2012–2014
- In office 2004–2008

Minister of Gender Equality and Family
- In office 2014–2015
- President: Park Geun-hye

Head of the Internet and Security Agency
- In office 2009–2010

Personal details
- Party: People Power Party

Kim Hee-jung is a South Korean politician. Kim is a member of the National Assembly, was the Minister of Gender Equality and Family, and head of the Internet and Security Agency.

Kim was first elected to the National Assembly in 2004, which she left to become the head of the Internet and Security Agency. She served as head of the agency from 2009 to 2010. She was reelected to the National Assembly in 2012, which she left in 2014 to become the Minister of Gender Equality and Family. Kim left her role as minister in 2015 to run for a National Assembly seat. Kim was reelected to the National Assembly in 2024. Kim is part of the World Economic Forum's Task Force on Gender Parity and Empowerment of Women.
