= Chicago Whip =

African-American newspaper (1919–1939)

- "Don't buy where you can't work"
- Type: Weekly newspaper
- Founder: William C. Linton
- Publisher: The Whip Publishing Company
- Associate editor: Joseph Dandridge Bibb
- Financier: Anthony Overton, Jesse Binga, and Oscar DePriest
- Founded: June 24, 1919; 107 years ago
- Ceased publication: 1939
- City: Chicago
- Country: United States
- Circulation: 65,000 (as of 1920)
- ISSN: 2694-099X
- OCLC number: 15192974

The Chicago Whip (sometimes referred to as simply The Whip) was an African American newspaper in Chicago from 1919 until 1939.

== History ==
In 1919, William C. Linton became the founding editor and publisher of the paper. Linton unexpectedly fell ill and died in March 1922 after which Joseph Dandridge Bibb (who previously served as a co-editor for the paper) took over. The paper's "Don't Spend Money Where You Can't Work" campaign advocated for the boycott of white-run businesses with racially discriminatory hiring practices, and the campaign led to over 15,000 Chicago blacks securing jobs. The newspaper was The Chicago Defender's contemporary and rival. Within a year of its launch, The Whip had a circulation of 65,000. 185,000 copies of The Defender were in circulation at the time. The Whip survived until 1939.

== See also ==
- Newspapers of the Chicago metropolitan area
