= William Linton (physician) =

Scottish army physician

- Born: 1801
- Died: 9 October 1880 (aged 78–79)
- Occupation: Army physician

Sir William Linton KCB (1801 – 9 October 1880) was a Scottish army physician.

== Biography ==
Linton was the eldest son of Jabez Linton of Hardrigg Lodge, Dumfriesshire, by Jane, daughter of William Crocket of Grahamshill in the same county. He was born in 1801 at Kirkpatrick Fleming. He was educated at Edinburgh University, and graduated L.R.C.S. in 1826. But he had already utilised four summer vacations as surgeon on a whaler in the arctic regions. He entered the army medical department in 1826, graduated M.D. at Glasgow in 1834, and became staff surgeon of the first class in 1848. After serving in Canada, the Mediterranean, and the West Indies, he was appointed deputy inspector-general of hospitals of the first division of the army in the Crimea, was present in every action up to the battle of Balaclava, and had care of the barrack hospital in Scutari shortly after its establishment in 1854 until the British forces came home. On his return in 1856 he was created C.B. In the following year he proceeded to India as inspector-general of hospitals, to which was soon added the post of principal medical officer of the European army. He held the offices throughout the Indian mutiny. His unremitting zeal was rewarded by his being in 1859 enrolled among her majesty's honorary physicians, and in 1865 he was advanced to the dignity of K.C.B. Linton retired from the active list in 1863, and died unmarried at his residence of Skairfield, Lockerbie, Dumfriesshire, on 9 October 1880.
