= Richard Linton (artist) =

Australian artist

- Born: September 1935 (age 90); Melbourne, Australia
- Education: self-taught, Melbourne School of Printing (RMIT)
- Known for: Painting, Printmaking

Richard Linton, ASMA, (born 1935) is an internationally renowned Australian artist. His paintings are primarily of maritime subjects.

== Early life ==
Linton was born in Melbourne in 1935. From the age of 16, he apprenticed in the printing trade, and also trained in photolithography at the Melbourne School of Printing (now a part of RMIT). He is primarily self-taught in painting. His first professional work was in 1957.

== Works ==
Linton is one of a select number of artists to have their work reproduced by the Franklin Mint and Mourlot Studios. His paintings have won numerous awards worldwide. He has twice won the prestigious Heidelberg Award. His work is represented in many public and private collections worldwide.

His studio was first located in central Frankston, a bayside suburb of Melbourne. In 2005, he relocated his studio to the Morning Star Estate, a vineyard just outside Frankston. His studio is housed in the old dairy on the estate.

His most recent works include The River Min and Spirit of the High Country.
