= George Linton (Jamaican cricketer) =

Jamaican cricketer

George Constantine Linton (27 July 1873 – 20 January 1960) was a Jamaican cricketer. He married Daisy Euraldine Delgado on 4 December 1907, in Kingston, Jamaica. They were the parents of at least 2 daughters. He played for Jamaica in the days before the first world war and was a member of the team to British Guiana and Barbados in 1896. Against R. A. Bennett's English tourists in 1902 he played an innings of 60 for Jamaica Born. He was a most powerful hitter and earned the title of the "local Jessop."
