= People Future Party =

People Future Party 국민의미래 國民의未來
- Abbreviation: PFP
- Leader: Cho Hye-jung
- Founded: 23 February 2024
- Registered: 27 February 2024
- Dissolved: 26 April 2024
- Split from: People Power Party
- Preceded by: Future Korea Party (de facto)
- Merged into: People Power Party
- Ideology: Conservatism (South Korean); South Korean nationalism
- Political position: Right-wing to far-right
- Constituency counterpart: People Power Party
- Colours: Red

Website
- www.peoplefutureparty.kr

The People Future Party (Korean: 국민의미래; RR: Gungminui mirae; lit. 'Future of Nationals') was a satellite party of the People Power Party established on 23 February 2024 and registered on 27 February 2024 in order to run for party-list proportional representation seats in the 2024 South Korean legislative election, similar to how the United Future Party formed the satellite Future Korea Party for the 2020 election.

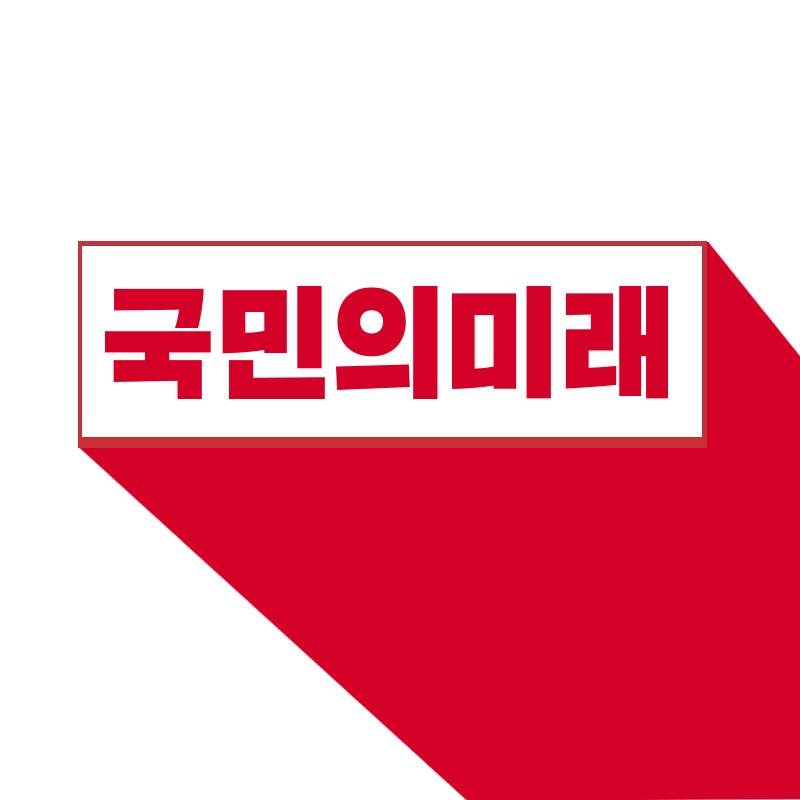
Logo of the People Future Party

It was announced it would merge back into the People Power Party by the end of April 2024.

== Election results ==
Election	Leader	Constituency			Party list			Seats	Position	Status
Election	Leader	Votes	%	Seats	Votes	%	Seats	Seats	Position	Status
2024	Cho Hye-jung				10,395,264	36.67	18 / 46	18 / 300	1st	Minority government

== See also ==
- Future Korea Party
