= Politics of South Korea =

Politics of the Republic of Korea 대한민국의 정치 (Korean)
- National emblem of the Republic of Korea
- Polity type: Unitary presidential constitutional republic
- Constitution: Constitution of the Republic of Korea

Legislative branch
- Name: National Assembly
- Type: Unicameral
- Meeting place: National Assembly Building
- Presiding officer: Cho Jeong-sik, Speaker of the National Assembly

Executive branch
- Head of state and government
- Title: President
- Currently: Lee Jae-myung
- Appointer: Direct popular vote
- Cabinet
- Name: State Council
- Leader: President
- Deputy leader: Prime Minister
- Appointer: President
- Headquarters: Yongsan, Seoul
- Ministries: 18

Judicial branch
- Name: Judiciary of South Korea
- Supreme Court
- Chief judge: Cho Hee-dae
- Constitutional Court
- Chief judge: Kim Sanghwan

Separation of powers and the election system of South Korea

The politics of South Korea take place in the framework of a presidential representative democratic republic, whereby the president is the head of state, and of a multi-party system. To ensure a separation of powers, the government of the Republic of Korea is made up of three branches: legislative, executive, and judicial. The government exercises executive power, and legislative power is vested in both the government and the National Assembly. The judiciary is independent of the executive and the legislature and comprises a Supreme Court, appellate courts, and a Constitutional Court.

Since 1948, the constitution has undergone nine major revisions, each signifying a new republic. The current Sixth Republic began with the last major constitutional revision that took effect in 1988. From its founding until the June (1987) Democratic Struggle, the South Korean political system operated under a military authoritarian regime, with the freedom of assembly, association, expression, press and religion as well as civil society activism being tightly restricted. During that period, there were no freely elected national leaders, political opposition was suppressed, dissent was not permitted and civil rights were curtailed.

The Economist Intelligence Unit rated South Korea a "full democracy" in 2022. According to the V-Dem Democracy indices in 2026, South Korea was the joint most electorally democratic country (alongside Japan), as well as the most liberally democratic country in Asia. South Korea is often cited as a model of democracy due to its relatively peaceful and internally-driven democratic transition.

The period from the mid-2000s to mid-2010s are often considered South Korea's backsliding period. Although, some have argued South Korea has hit a democratic ceiling and changes are more characteristic of democratic stagnation, rather than outright regression. This took the form of more state involvement (particularly through the Korea Communications Commission or KCC) in media control and less editorial independence among journalists with conservative media owners.

Overall, political expression lagged behind comparable democracies. Additionally, South Korea has very strict election and campaign finance regulations, that includes no door-to-door canvassing and, consequently, some have cited these regulations as barriers to political expression and free and fair elections. These changes have largely attributed to South Korea's weak political party structure that emphasizes leaders and, consequently, hyper-presidentialism. Moreover, a right-left ideological divide has been more deeply entrenched into South Korean political society. However, South Korea is considered to have a strong civil society or simin sahoe manifested through a large number of civic organizations that prevented further backsliding via the 2016-2017 Candlelight Demonstrations. South Korea was also plagued by strong regionalism, dating back to the Silla-Baekje rivalry.

Under more recent administrations such as President Yoon Suk Yeol, South Korea has taken a stance as a "Global Pivotal State," which involves a greater role in East Asia as a democratic power. Despite its own democratic struggles, South Korea has taken an active role on democracy on the global stage, having hosted the 2024 Summit for Democracy and committing to "strengthen coordination on promoting democracy and protecting human rights" at the 2023 Camp David Summit with the U.S. and Japan, bolstering their trilateral relationship.

== National government ==
=== Executive branch ===
Main office-holders
Office	Name	Party	Since
President	Lee Jae-myung	Democratic	4 June 2025
Prime Minister of South Korea	Han Seong-sook	Independent	1 July 2026

The head of state is the president, who is elected by direct popular vote for a single five-year term. The president is Commander-in-Chief of the Republic of Korea Armed Forces and enjoys considerable executive powers.

The president appoints the prime minister with approval of the National Assembly, as well as appointing and presiding over the State Council of chief ministers as the head of government. On 12 March 2004, the executive power of then President Roh Moo-hyun was suspended when the Assembly voted to impeach him and Prime Minister Goh Kun became an Acting President. On 14 May 2004, the Constitutional Court overturned the impeachment decision made by the Assembly and Roh was reinstated.

On 4 June 2025, Lee Jae-myung succeeded Yoon Suk Yeol as president of South Korea.

=== Legislative branch ===
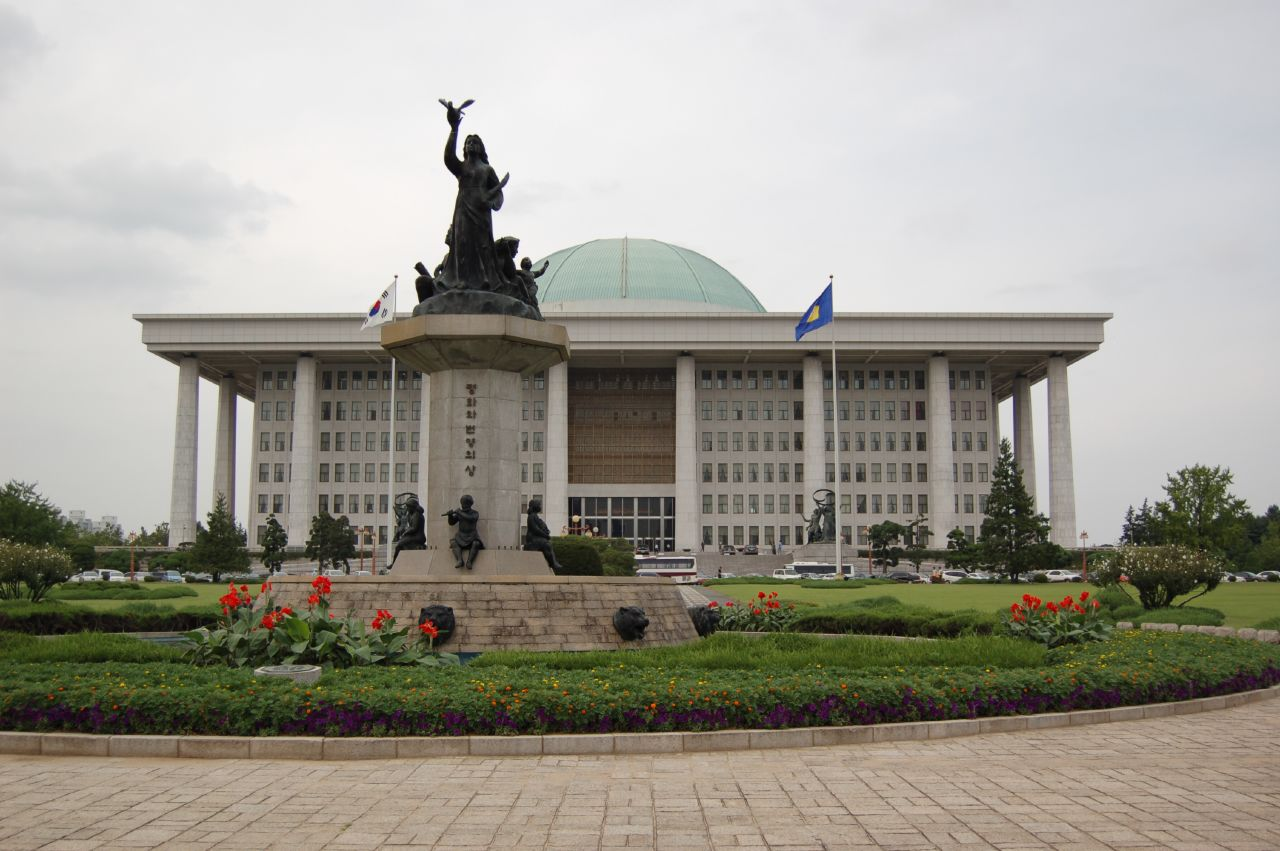
National Assembly of South Korea in Seoul

The National Assembly (Korean: 국회; Hanja: 國會; RR: gukhoe) has 300 members, elected for a four-year term, 253 members in single-seat constituencies and 47 members by proportional representation. The ruling Democratic Party of Korea is the largest party in the Assembly.

=== Judicial branch ===
The South Korean judiciary is independent of the other two branches of government, and is composed of two different highest courts. Inferior ordinary courts are under the Supreme Court, whose justices are appointed by the president of South Korea with the consent of the National Assembly. In addition, the Constitutional Court oversees questions of constitutionality, as single and the only court whose justices are appointed by the president of South Korea by equal portion of nomination from the president, the National Assembly, and the Supreme Court Chief justice. South Korea has not accepted compulsory ICJ jurisdiction.

== Political parties and elections ==
South Korea elects on national level a head of state – the president – and a legislature. The president is elected for a five-year term by the people. The National Assembly (Gukhoe) has 300 members, elected for a four-year term, 253 members in single-seat constituencies and 47 members by proportional representation.

The main two political parties in South Korea are the centrist or centre-left Democratic Party of Korea (lit. 'Together Democratic Party' or DPK) and the conservative People Power Party (PPP), formerly the United Future Party (UFP). These are the dominant forces of South Korean politics at present.

Parties in the 22nd National Assembly
Group	Floor leader	Seats	% of seats
▌Democratic Party	Han Byung-do	166 (Note: Including 14 seats held by the Democratic Alliance of Korea)	55.33%
▌People Power Party	Jeong Jeom-sig	107 (Note: Including 13 seats held by the People's Future Party)	35.67%
▌Rebuilding Korea Party	Kim Joon-hyung	12	4%
▌Progressive party	Yoon Jong-oh	4	1.33%
▌New Reform party	Chun Ha-ram	3	1%
▌Basic Income Party	Yong Hye-in	1	0.33%
▌Social Democratic Party	Han Chang-min	1	0.33%
▌Independents		4	1.33%
▌Vacant		2	0.67%
Total		300	100.0%
Notes: 1. Negotiation groups can be formed by 20 or more members.

=== Political nature ===
South Korea's political history has always been prone to splits from and merges with other parties. One reason is that there is a greater emphasis around the 'politics of the individual' rather than the party; therefore, party loyalty is not strong when disagreements occur. The graph below illustrates the extent of the political volatility within the last 10 years alone. These splits were intensified after the 2016 South Korean political scandal. Party realignment is a persistent feature of Korean party politics. The repeated mergers and splits among political parties indicate a low level of institutionalization. Studies have generally assessed the institutionalization of Korean party politics as weak. After democratization, a personalistic party structure, a lack of voluntary party foundation, a lack of development into a policy party, and confrontational relations between political parties have been identified as major factors contributing to the low institutionalization of Korean party politics. The following is an explanation of the four factors above. Since democratization, Korean political parties have long had a fragmented structure centered on party leaders with regional bases. It also functioned as an electoral body to realize the personal political goals of party leaders. As political parties repeatedly merged and disintegrated according to the political interests of their leaders, the stable institutionalization of party politics failed to take place. Korean political parties have operated under an undemocratic structure, with the central party and grassroots organizations centered around leaders. Even recently, there have been criticisms that the distinction between public and private affairs within political parties has become blurred, resulting in nominations being made for the personal gain of the party leader. As a result, voluntary voter participation in party politics has been limited, making it difficult for parties to establish a stable organizational foundation. The absence of voluntary voter participation has hindered the institutionalization of party politics. And this has also made it difficult for political parties to carry out their essential functions, namely, expressing and uniting social interests. A survey result also showed that when National Assembly members choose important agendas, they consider their party's platform and policies more important than the policy preferences of their constituents or public opinion. In a survey on factors influencing the agenda of National Assembly members' legislative activities, 61.4% of respondents chose 'affiliated party's platform and policies', while 43.8% chose 'preferences for local constituents' policies'. Accordingly, the development of a political party with policy differentiation has also been delayed. As a result, Korean political parties have not been able to sufficiently perform their political agenda-setting function of gathering the diverse demands of voters and turning these demands into political issues. South Korea's party politics has shown limited effectiveness in resolving social conflicts and promoting social integration. Despite a long period of democratization, party politics still maintains a confrontational structure, hindering productive legislative activity that responds promptly to public demands.

Some have argued that South Korea's political parties, dominated by powerful politicians and driven by competition, have maintained stability without a solid public organizational foundation. The South Korean party system, dominated by a small number of powerful politicians, has been labeled a "partyless democracy." In Korean political parties, patron-client relationships between faction leaders and their followers influence party decision-making and significantly impact nomination outcomes. During the 20th general election, the Saenuri Party promised 100% bottom-up nominations, but its nomination management committee unilaterally excluded non-Park Geun-hye figures from the nomination process. The Democratic Party of Korea pursued a system-based nomination system, but it implemented factional nominations that conflicted with the party constitution and rules.

During the 22nd National Assembly election, the major political parties also faced similar controversies during their nomination processes. The Democratic Party of Korea advocated for "systematic nominations" and emphasized the transparency of its internal nomination process. However, some media outlets pointed out that a large number of candidates from certain factions were nominated. In the case of the Democratic Party of Korea, 45% of its candidates for the 21st general election were replaced. Approximately 110 candidates, primarily those sympathetic to Lee Jae-myung, received nominations. As a result, after the 22nd general election, the Democratic Party of Korea became a party dominated by those who supported Lee Jae-myung.

The recent emergence of "fandom politics" in Korean politics is an extension of the party system dominated by a small number of influential politicians. "Fandom politics" refers to groups or political phenomena where fans worship a particular politician, as if they were celebrities or sports stars, and engage in fan-like activities. This phenomenon of politicians becoming celebrities, coupled with the proliferation of network media such as the Internet and social media as well as traditional legacy media, has led to the "personalization of politics," in which the influence of individual politicians is strengthened and the influence of institutional political organizations such as political parties is relatively weakened. The phenomenon of political leaders' personal charisma and leadership overwhelming the influence of political parties reflects the trend toward "personalization of politics." This personalization has forced political parties to move beyond their traditional supporter-centric mobilization strategies and explore new political lines. As a result, the policy and ideological elements of political parties have been relatively diminished, while emotional factors, such as the personal appeal of political leaders and popular sympathy, have come to play a greater role in shaping political support.

Most researchers agree that the term “fandom politics” in South Korea began to be used after the formation of the political community “Nosamo,” which supported former President Roh Moo-hyun, in May 2000. The 16th presidential election in 2002, held in the Web 1.0 era, ushered in an era of widespread online campaigning, sparking a surge in online campaigning. In the two-way primary between Lee Hoi-chang of the Grand National Party and Roh Moo-hyun of the Millennium Democratic Party, Roh emerged victorious, outpacing Lee in online campaigning. Upon Roh's victory, domestic and international media outlets proclaimed him "the world's first internet president." In March 2004, a group supporting Park Geun-hye, "ParkSamo," emerged. In Korea, the original political fan clubs are largely divided into the progressive "NoSamo" and the conservative "ParkSamo." ParkSamo spearheaded Park Geun-hye's victory in the 2012 presidential election and actively and devotedly defended former President Park both before and after the election. A prime example is the nationwide candlelight protests demanding an investigation into the truth behind the botched Sewol ferry disaster and the Choi Soon-sil scandal, which led to the presidential impeachment. ParkSamo held rallies and other events during the impeachment process, confronting the candlelight protesters. Since then, Korean political fandom has continued with fandoms of Moon Jae-in, Lee Jae-myung, and Han Dong-hoon. Moon Jae-in's fandom actively spread political messages by sharing information about former President Moon Jae-in online, creating fan art and merchandise, and Lee Jae-myung's fandom called themselves "dog daughters" (daughters of reform) and even launched a comment relay saying, "We will become daughters" after his defeat in the presidential election. They exert strong solidarity around each politician, influencing not only the formation of political discourse but also the actual political process.

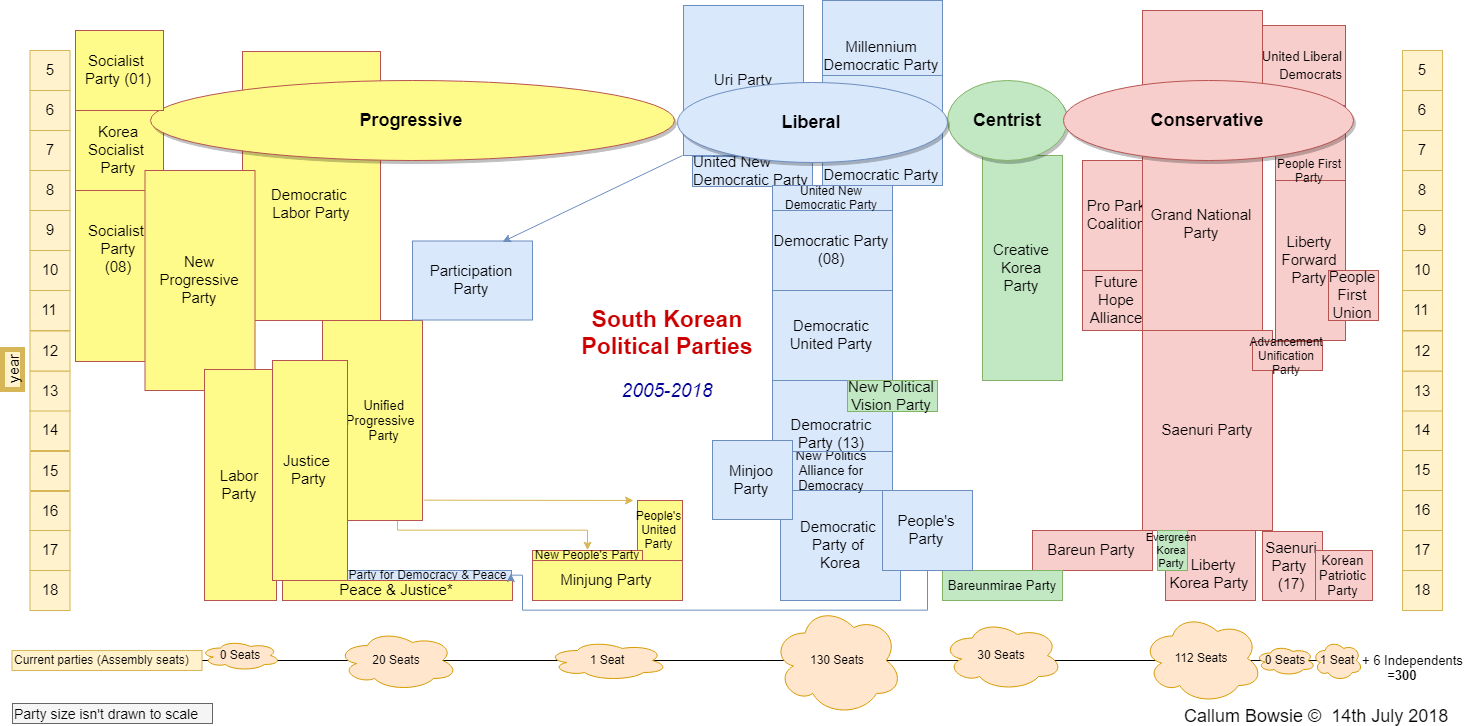
This graph traces the recent origins of all six main political parties currently in the Republic of Korea, all of which have either split from or merged with other parties in the last four years. They have emerged from four main ideological camps, from Left to Right: Progressive (socialist), liberal, centrist, and conservative.

A 2025 opinion poll found the most important political issues were job creation, institutional reform, housing and polarization.

=== Latest elections ===
==== Presidential election ====
On June 3, 2025, Lee Jae-myung won the election with 49.42% of the votes over the ruling party's Kim Moon-soo. He will be sworn into office only hours after the election.

== Political pressure groups and leaders ==
- Federation of Korean Industries
- Federation of Korean Trade Unions
- Korean Confederation of Trade Unions
- Korean National Council of Churches
- Korean Traders Association
- Korean Veterans' Association
- National Council of Labor Unions
- National Democratic Alliance of Korea
- National Federation of Farmers' Associations
- National Federation of Student Associations

== Collusion between politics and Protestantism ==
South Korea's two major political parties (People Power Party, Democratic Party of Korea) are very conscious of the votes of South Korean Protestant voters. This has led to South Korean politics neglecting LGBTQ rights and reluctance to enact anti-discrimination laws. Because, South Korea has adopted a single-member district system without a two-round system for its National Assembly elections. This is advantageous for conservative South Korean Protestants, who can leverage their strong unity to push through their agenda. Especially in areas like Gyeonggi Province and Seoul, where margins of victory can be as small as 1%, 2%, or 3%, South Korean Christian groups are highly organised and powerful. Therefore, campaigning to defeat a candidate would inevitably jeopardize their own political careers, forcing them to adopt a passive stance.

This political collusion with South Korean Protestantism is hindering the introduction of comprehensive sexuality education, a program aimed at improving South Korea's criticised sex education system. South Korean Protestantism makes the scientifically unsubstantiated claim that comprehensive sexuality education promotes early sexualization.(조기 성애화, jogi seongaehwa)

Actually, South Korea's Protestantism is being criticised for actively interfering in the politics of own country and for pushing through some of their demands, rendering the separation of church and state meaningless.

== Administrative divisions ==
One Special City (Teukbyeolsi, Capital City), six Metropolitan Cities (Gwangyeoksi, singular and plural), nine Provinces (Do, singular and plural) and one Special Autonomous City (Sejong City).

- Seoul Teukbyeolsi (서울특별시)
- Busan Gwangyeoksi (부산광역시)
- Daegu Gwangyeoksi (대구광역시)
- Incheon Gwangyeoksi (인천광역시)
- Daejeon Gwangyeoksi (대전광역시)
- Gwangju Gwangyeoksi (광주광역시)
- Ulsan Gwangyeoksi (울산광역시)
- Gyeonggi-do (경기도)
- Gangwon-do (강원도)
- Chungcheongbuk-do (충청북도)
- Chungcheongnam-do (충청남도)
- Jeollabuk-do (전라북도)
- Jeollanam-do (전라남도)
- Gyeongsangbuk-do (경상북도)
- Gyeongsangnam-do (경상남도)
- Jeju Teukbyeoljachi-do (제주특별자치도)
- Sejong Teukbyeol-jachisi (세종특별자치시)

== Foreign relations ==
South Korea is a member of the

- African Development Bank
- Asia-Pacific Economic Cooperation
- Asian Development Bank
- Bank for International Settlements
- Colombo Plan
- European Bank for Reconstruction and Development
- United Nations Economic and Social Commission for Asia and the Pacific
- Food and Agriculture Organization
- Group of 77
- International Atomic Energy Agency
- International Bank for Reconstruction and Development
- International Civil Aviation Organization
- International Criminal Court
- International Chamber of Commerce
- International Red Cross and Red Crescent Movement
- International Development Association
- International Energy Agency (observer)
- International Fund for Agricultural Development
- International Finance Corporation
- International Hydrographic Organization
- International Labour Organization
- International Monetary Fund
- International Maritime Organization
- International Mobile Satellite Organization
- Intelsat
- Interpol
- International Olympic Committee
- International Organization for Migration
- International Organization for Standardization
- International Telecommunication Union
- International Trade Union Confederation
- United Nations Mission for the Referendum in Western Sahara
- Non-Aligned Movement (guest)
- Nuclear Suppliers Group
- Organization of American States (observer)
- OECD
- Organisation for the Prohibition of Chemical Weapons
- Organization for Security and Co-operation in Europe (partner)
- United Nations
- United Nations Conference on Trade and Development
- UNESCO
- United Nations Industrial Development Organization
- UN mediation of the Kashmir dispute
- United Nations Observer Mission in Georgia
- United Nations University
- Universal Postal Union
- World Customs Organization
- World Health Organization
- World Intellectual Property Organization
- World Meteorological Organization
- World Tourism Organization
- World Trade Organization
- Zangger Committee

== Interest Groups of South Korea ==
=== Definition ===
An Interest Group is defined as a collective of individuals who strive to influence public policy to achieve their members' common interests. These groups employ various means and methods to exert influence throughout the political process, aiming to advance either members' interests (private interests) or the public interest. The influence of interest groups is evident at every stage of the policy process, encompassing agenda-setting, policy formulation and decision-making, as well as policy implementation and evaluation. In South Korea, the active exertion of influence by interest groups became prominent following the country's democratization in 1987, as the system transitioned towards a pluralistic interest representation system.

Although interest groups are not formal participants in the policy-making process, they are classified as informal participants because they seek to exert influence over the formal participants to further their own interests.

In South Korea, interest groups can generally be categorized into four types: economic interest groups, labor interest groups, professional interest groups, and consumer & civic organizations.

== Economic Interest Groups of South Korea ==
=== Korean Chamber of Commerce and Industry (KCCI) ===
The Korean Chamber of Commerce and Industry (KCCI), founded in 1884, is the oldest and largest business organization in South Korea, representing about 140,000 member companies through 71 regional chambers. As the nation’s sole representative to the International Chamber of Commerce (ICC), KCCI connects Korean enterprises with over 200 chambers worldwide, supporting their global expansion. It serves as a key policy partner of the government, addressing business, labor, and trade issues while protecting corporate interests. KCCI also offers management consulting, trade information, and training services, and has administered national qualification examinations since 1962 as an authorized testing institution.

The Korean Chamber of Commerce and Industry (KCCI) carries out various initiatives to improve Korea’s business environment, promote entrepreneurship, encourage corporate social responsibility, and strengthen global competitiveness. KCCI contributes to creating a favorable business climate by providing economic insights such as the Business Survey Index (BSI), submitting policy proposals on finance, taxation, and regulation, and promoting cooperative labor-management relations. It also conducts analyses of industrial trends and develops strategies to enhance the competitiveness of both traditional and emerging industries.

To foster entrepreneurship, the KCCI supports startups and small and medium-sized enterprises (SMEs) through education, management consulting, and global cooperation programs, including the Korea–Japan Startup Forum. It also conducts research on the state of entrepreneurship and recommends policy measures to encourage innovation and sustainable growth.

In the area of corporate social responsibility (CSR), the KCCI promotes the spread of ESG (Environmental, Social, and Governance) management by providing guidelines and analysis, supports initiatives to address demographic challenges such as low birth rates and population aging, and leads social contribution activities including childcare support projects and aid for veterans and first responders.

The KCCI also plays a key role in enhancing global competitiveness by expanding international business cooperation through 34 economic committees in 32 countries, participating in multilateral forums such as the OECD’s Business and Industry Advisory Committee (BIAC), and collaborating with global think tanks to address international trade and supply chain issues. It further works to resolve challenges faced by Korean businesses abroad by facilitating dialogue with foreign embassies and government officials.

=== Federation of Korean Industries (FKI) ===
Founded in 1961, Federation of Korean Industries (FKI) is one of Korea’s four major economic bodies and serves as a representative voice of Korean businesses. It promotes industrial development and international economic exchange while unifying business opinions on fiscal, financial, and trade matters to influence national economic policy.

FKI promotes a better business environment, entrepreneurship, corporate social responsibility, and global competitiveness. It enhances policy efficiency, supports legal and regulatory advancement, and fosters cooperative labor relations. FKI encourages entrepreneurship through education, SME support, and international collaboration. It leads CSR initiatives by promoting ESG management and addressing demographic challenges. Additionally, FKI strengthens global competitiveness by expanding international cooperation, dispatching business delegations, and supporting Korean companies in overcoming global business challenges.

FKI has established and supported several affiliated organizations to promote industrial development and enhance corporate management efficiency. These include the Korea Management Association (KMA), Korea Employers Federation (KEF), National Health Insurance Service (NHIS), Korea Energy Agency (KEA), Korea Biotechnology Industry Organization (Korea BIO), Korea Advertisers Association (KAA), Korea Information Industry Association (KIIA), and Korea Business Finance Association. Through these institutions, the FKI contributes to advancing Korea’s economy and fostering collaboration across various industries.

=== Korea Enterprises Federation (KEF) ===
The Korea Enterprises Federation (KEF) is a comprehensive economic organization in South Korea established in 1970. It was founded to contribute to the development of the national economy by promoting free-market economic and social policies, enhancing corporate competitiveness, and fostering cooperative labor-management relations.

The Federation’s main objectives include strengthening corporate competitiveness, improving labor systems and employment, and creating jobs. In recent years, its activities have expanded beyond traditional labor-management issues to encompass broader economic areas, including economic policy, industrial policy, business systems, and regulatory innovation. Reflecting this wider scope, the organization changed its English name from 'Korea Employers Federation' to 'Korea Enterprises Federation.'

As a key government partner in shaping economic policy, KEF participates in major policy discussions and strives to stabilize labor relations and foster a cooperative labor culture. It represents the business community in domestic and international economic cooperation networks and provides consulting and support services related to wages, labor management systems, and working hours. The Federation also offers education and up-to-date information on industrial relations and human resources for its member companies.

KEF publishes the monthly 'KEF e-Magazine', which provides analyses and commentary on revised labor laws, pension reform, and employment insurance policy, as well as surveys on youth employment trends. To support the advancement of ESG management, it also releases a monthly report titled 'ESG Trends', featuring updates on sustainability reporting standards in the EU (VSME and ESRS), carbon reduction initiatives, and carbon circulation pilot projects.

=== Korea International Trade Association (KITA) ===
Since its establishment in 1946, Korea International Trade Association(KITA) has been the largest business organization in South Korea and currently represents over 77,000 member companies.

KITA represent the interests and rights of Korea’s business community and perform multiple functions such as providing hands-on support to business, formulating new trade strategies, promoting private sector trade cooperation, and building trade infrastructure.

KITA coordinates overseas trade missions and conducts market research to facilitate global business connections. It provides advisory and consulting services for exporters and importers regarding trade rules and regulations. KITA operates three offices in the United States and maintains seven branches in other countries.

As an economic organization, the goal of KITA is to contribute to Korea’s economic growth by standing up for the Korean trade industry’s interests and rights, facilitating global trade.

As global ESG regulations are strengthened, export companies are facing challenges in responding. KITA is taking the lead in supporting ESG management for exporters. It recognizes ESG as an essential element directly related to export competitiveness. The association aims to provide ESG assessments for 50 companies and customized on-site consulting for 20 companies through specialized organizations. KITA also provides consulting services for member companies on greenhouse gas inventory development and international certification.

== Professional Interest Group ==
=== Definition ===
Professional interest groups are organizations formed by individuals working in specific professions or fields of expertise, which aim both to represent the rights and interests of their members and to improve their social and economic status. These associations typically bring together licensed or credentialed practitioners such as lawyers, nurses, or teachers and act collectively to influence public policy, regulatory frameworks, labor conditions and professional standards. In doing so, they combine the functions of a professional association that promotes ethical standards and professional practice and advocacy body, seeking better remuneration, autonomy and working conditions Also, as a policy stakeholder that shapes legislation, regulation and public-service delivery. Because their members share a discrete occupation and common professional identity, professional interest groups are distinguished from broader labor or trade unions by their focus on professional status, expertise, self-regulation and the socio-economic advancement of the profession. Moreover, these groups often engage in research, public education, and collaboration with governmental and international organizations to advance their professions’ contributions to society. They serve as vital intermediaries between the state and professional communities, ensuring that expertise informs policymaking while safeguarding the autonomy and integrity of professional practice.

=== General Characteristics ===
Professional interest groups typically display several identifiable characteristics which reflect their dual role as both professional associations and policy-actors. One key feature is expertise-based membership. These groups are formed by individuals possessing specialized training, certification or licensing in a distinct professional field, and their identity and authority rest on that specialized knowledge.

Another characteristic is a formal membership system. Professional interest groups maintain defined criteria for membership such as credentialing, licensing or affiliation, membership dues or fees, and institutional structures that ensure the organization represents the defined professional constituency rather than general labor.

They often make the tension between public vs. private interest while they advance the socio-economic status of their own members, they also claim to protect public interest through professional standards, ethics and service quality. This can lead to what some describe as a “two-faced” nature: on one hand professional enhancement, on the other interest protection.

These groups frequently have close ties with the government. Because their members operate in regulated fields such as law, medicine, and education. They interact with state agencies, ministries, licensing boards, and regulatory processes.

They engage in lobbying and pressure tactics—making policy submissions, organizing collective action, protests or strikes when necessary—to influence legislation, regulation or administrative decisions that affect their profession.

Because the membership is credentialled and the profession specialized, they display exclusive expertise, reinforcing the perception that only qualified members can define standards, self-regulate, and speak for the profession.

They tend to be strongly organized, with centralized national leadership, regional branches, professional staff, secretariats, and research or policy units, enabling sustained advocacy.

Finally, they exert policy influence by providing expert testimony, drafting policy proposals, participating in advisory committees and shaping the regulatory environment for their profession. Their combination of technical expertise, membership density, and institutional access gives them notable influence in policy-making processes.

=== Background ===
The emergence of professional interest groups in South Korea is closely related to the nation’s political modernization, socio-economic transformation, and the institutionalization of professional occupations throughout the twentieth century. During the Japanese colonial period (1910–1945), modern systems of law, medicine, and education were introduced, and Western-style professional qualifications began to take root in Korea, leading to the formation of early professional identities among lawyers, physicians, and teachers.

After Korea’s independent in 1945, professional organizations were restructured within the framework of state-building and national development. These organizations sought to restore professional autonomy while cooperating with state authorities in rebuilding national institutions.

During the developmental state era under President Park Chung-hee in the 1960s and 1970s, the government actively mobilized professional associations as partners in modernization, while these groups simultaneously acted as policy advocates or pressure groups within corporatist arrangements.

Following democratization in 1987, constitutional guarantees of freedom of association and expression expanded the scope of civil society, enabling professional associations to engage more actively in policy debates, social advocacy, and ethical self-regulation. In contemporary Korea, professional interest groups serve not only as occupational representatives but also as institutional actors influencing lawmaking, healthcare reform, and educational policy, reflecting their evolution into key intermediaries between the state and expert communities.

=== Korean Bar Associatation ===
The Korean Bar Association (KBA), established in 1952, is the national organization representing all licensed lawyers in South Korea. It regulates legal ethics, oversees training and professional conduct, and promotes the independence of the legal profession. The KBA also provides policy advice, offers continuing education, and conducts public service through legal aid and human rights advocacy. As both a regulatory and representative body, it maintains cooperation and tension with the government, balancing members’ professional interests with the broader goal of upholding justice and the rule of law in Korean society.

=== Korean Medical Association ===
The Korean Medical Association (KMA) represents physicians across South Korea and serves as the country’s largest professional body for doctors. Founded in 1908, it aims to improve medical standards, protect physicians’ rights, and influence public health policy. The KMA organizes medical education programs, publishes research journals, and engages in health-policy negotiations with government authorities. It often acts as a lobbying organization, mobilizing collective actions when medical autonomy or working conditions are threatened. Through these functions, the KMA plays a crucial role in shaping national healthcare policy and representing physicians’ professional and ethical interests.

=== Korean Nursing Association ===
The Korean Nurses Association (KNA), founded in 1923, is the leading organization representing registered nurses in South Korea. It promotes professional education, policy participation, and the social recognition of nursing. The KNA supports legislative initiatives that strengthen the nursing workforce and improve healthcare quality. It also fosters international collaboration through global nursing networks. With its emphasis on professional ethics and patient safety, the KNA works to advance both nurses’ welfare and the quality of public healthcare services, illustrating the growing influence of nursing as a professional interest group in Korean society.

=== Korean Federation of Teachers' Association ===
The Korean Federation of Teachers’ Associations (KFTA), established in 1947, is South Korea’s largest organization for educators. It represents teachers from primary to secondary education, promoting professional development, fair labor conditions, and high teaching standards. The KFTA actively participates in education policy discussions, collaborating with the Ministry of Education on curriculum reform and teacher welfare. It also provides training and research support for members. Balancing advocacy and public responsibility, the KFTA seeks to enhance the professional status of teachers while contributing to the development of equitable and effective educational policies nationwide.

== Consumer Interest Group & Civic Organization ==
=== Definition of Consumer Interest Groups ===
It is an interest group that represents the consumer sector among the economic sectors. It refers to a social group that is organized to protect and promote the rights and interests of consumers, exerts influence on the government or companies, and demands market monitoring and corporate social responsibility. It also refers to an organization that systematically gathers and works to protect and improve the rights that arise when consumers use products or services. As a representative of consumers, it exerts influence on society as a whole, including participating in the government's policy-making process, monitoring corporate unfair behavior, and demanding improvement. It is also an interest group that makes efforts to strengthen the voices of consumers, the weak, in the economic structure centered on large corporations. The main functions of consumer interest groups are the function of protecting and advocating consumer rights and interests, as well as the function of providing information and education for consumers. The consumer rights and interests protection function is to help consumers buy goods, use services, and solve damage. It also mediates problem-solving or provides legal support. The consumer education function is to provide and educate various information to help consumers spend reasonably. It is to educate them on what to be careful about when signing a contract and how to deal with damage.

=== Background ===
Korea entered a consumer society in earnest in the 1980s. People began to express their individuality not only through the use of goods but also through consumption. As consumption emerged as an important part of society, the problems faced by consumers began to become diverse and important. Based on these social changes, Korea's consumer policy began in earnest with the enactment of the 'Consumer Protection Act' in 1980. The content of the law was that the state legally recognizes and protects consumer rights. Based on this law, consumers have the basis for claiming their rights, and the enactment of this law became the basis for consumer interest groups to operate. Since then, Korea's economy has rapidly developed, companies have grown, and groups such as large corporations have increased their share of the economy, making it difficult for consumers to speak out individually against them. Therefore, the need for consumer interest groups has grown in order for many people to share the difficult battle with large corporations, which is difficult alone.

=== Examples ===
==== Green Consumer Alliance ====
The Green Consumer Alliance is an organization that aims to preserve the ecological environment and build a safe and humane society by protecting consumers' rights and practicing a consumer life that considers the environment together. The organization is campaigning to establish an environmental lifestyle together to overcome the increasingly deepening global environmental crisis and seeks to transition to an environmentally friendly and sustainable socio-economic system. Major projects include consumer rights protection and legal aid projects, environmental conservation projects through various campaigns, fair trade order establishment and monopoly prevention projects, consumer behavior networks and local organization projects, and information provision projects.

==== Korea Consumer Federation ====
Founded in January 1970, the Korea Consumer Federation was the first private organization specializing in the consumer movement in Korea, and it laid the foundation for the Korean consumer movement by developing and implementing methodologies such as consumer counseling, product testing, consumer research, and consumer education. It also established various laws and systems for consumer protection, established consumer policies, and established standards for resolving consumer disputes to remedy consumer damage, laying the foundation for the guarantee of consumers' rights before and after. The Consumer Federation has local organizations in nine regions, including Incheon, Gyeonggi, Gangwon, Daegu, Jeonnam, Busan, Daejeon, and Gwangju, including its headquarters and Seoul branch, and conducts information exchange and solidarity activities with consumer organizations around the world. There are four major activities of the Korea Consumer Federation. The first is the operation of the Consumer Information Center, which operates a counseling center to receive and process consumer complaints about various products and services through phone calls or online, and to provide necessary information to consumers. In recent years, professional counseling and monitoring activities are mainly conducted to prevent and respond to new types of consumer damage caused by the development of information. The second is consumer education. Consumer education is conducted nationwide to cultivate reasonable consumers and prevent consumer damage. Instructors are dispatched to institutions and schools that require consumer education, and textbooks for education are produced. The third is product testing. Through specialized experiments on the quality, performance, and safety of various products, it provides comparison information for each product required for consumers to choose, and allows safety problems or defective products to be recovered and improved. The last is a collective consumer action. In order to demand the correction and suspension of the continuing unfair behavior that hinders the consumer interests of the business operator, the consumer group lawsuit system is being used to solve the problem through litigation. To this end, the Korea Consumer Federation created the 'Consumer Public Interest Litigation Center' in March 2015 and has formed and operated a collective consumer lawsuit response team composed of consumer law scholars and lawyers. In addition to class action, efforts are being made to improve laws and systems by discovering consumer problems that are not improving due to lack of laws and systems.

==== Korea Consumer Organization Council ====
The Korea Consumer Organization Council aims to effectively develop consumer protection campaigns by forming a council that combines organizations engaged in consumer protection activities to promote consumers' sound and independent organizational activities and protect their rights and interests. Starting with four organizations in 1976, the Korea Consumer Organization Council is currently carrying out a consumer movement with 11 member organizations and 255 local organizations. Major tasks include overseeing consumer counseling and damage relief, information service projects to increase the utilization of data by building a database of information necessary for consumers, monthly consumer publishing and public relations activities, and overseeing price research and monitoring activities.

=== Definition of Civic Organization ===
Interest groups usually refer to organizations that represent the interests of a specific group or class. However, civic groups can also be viewed as a type of interest group in a broad sense. Civic groups are distinguished from political parties in that they promote citizen participation, secure autonomy over the state, and promote the public interest. Although civic groups are characterized by the pursuit of the public interest, they can be classified as a form of interest group in a broad sense in that they strive to influence policy in order to achieve the goal of the public interest. Civic groups intend to expand their political support base by participating in committees, contacting lawmakers or bureaucrats, promoting legislation, and holding seminars to make certain social issues a policy agenda. Some civic groups exert the same influence as other interest groups based on their expertise in specific issues.

=== Background ===
In June 1987, Korea gained freedom and democracy through a historical event called the June Democratic Uprising. Since June, freedom of speech, assembly, and association has been greatly guaranteed, people's awareness of participation has increased, and an environment has been established in which citizens can gather their will to work. Civic groups monitored political and economic power through the voluntary participation of citizens and suggested specific policies and alternatives. The real-name financial system and property disclosure of public officials proposed by the Economic Justice Action Coalition (1989) were accepted as government policies and contributed to economic democratization. In addition, it was a major player in changes in Korean society, such as the demand for environmental organizations to implement the waste-based system, the abolition of the Australian system by women's organizations, and the mandatory sexual harassment prevention education.In addition, civic groups' political participation began in earnest in the 1990s, and 63.6% of civic groups were established at this time. However, after the 2000s, criticism of the 'citizen-free civic movement' appeared and faced a crisis. Since then, the agenda of the civic movement has diversified, the national democratization as well as the civic movement for welfare, education, medical care, culture, women, and youth has been relatively strengthened, and the theory of crisis has calmed down. Early civic groups were strong political actors because of the special political situation in Korea, but institutional politics stabilized and quickly depoliticized. Therefore, specialization and diversification are currently taking place by subject.

=== Examples ===
==== Solidarity for Participatory Democracy ====
The People's Solidarity for Participatory Democracy is a civic group to create a just and democratic society. Launched on September 10, 1994, it strives to establish the rule of law based on citizens' democratic participation by monitoring and accusing the abuse of power and monopoly of opportunity in various fields of society. Major activities include the campaign to enact the Anti-Corruption Act and enhancing transparency in corporate management through minority shareholder movements. In 2024, he conducted activities such as the Itaewon Disaster Citizens' Countermeasures Conference, Pension Reform, Public Medical Movement, Peace Action on the Korean Peninsula in 70 years of the armistice, and Solidarity for the enactment of anti-discrimination laws. This solidarity activity is one of the important ways of activities of the participatory solidarity, and it is a strategy of the participatory solidarity to maximize the impact of the movement. The Participatory Solidarity categorizes solidarity activity organizations into three categories: permanent domestic solidarity organizations, temporary domestic solidarity organizations, and permanent international solidarity organizations. If specific topics and activity deadlines are set for each case and agenda, temporary and comprehensive activity goals are classified as permanent organizations in the case of photography. In January 2025, there were 10 domestic standing organizations, 84 domestic temporary organizations, and 8 international standing organizations.

==== the Union for Environmental Movement ====
Environmental Movement Alliance is an alliance founded in 1988 with the roots of the Korea International Union for the Elimination of Pollution Movement. Immediately after the foundation of the Korea International Union for the Elimination of Pollution Movement, environmental organizations involving office workers, housewives, students, and experts began to be formed across the country. With the 1992 United Nations Conference on Environmental Development held in Rio, the Korean environmental movement came to pursue new changes. A coalition was formed to preserve the global environment through national solidarity, expanding the scope from the victim-centered anti-pollution movement to citizens. As a result, eight environmental organizations across the country were integrated to form the National Federation of Environmental Movement. The core values of the environmental movement alliance are 'life, peace, and ecological participation', and the core goals are four. The first is the earth where life breathes, the second is the peaceful Korean Peninsula, the third is a sustainable ecological democratic society, and the fourth is a free civil community. Major areas of activity include climate energy, denuclearization, resource circulation, ocean, ecological conservation, chemical safety, international solidarity, and environment in general. The Environmental Movement Union is an organization that accuses illegal environmental damage through direct environmental monitoring activities and focuses on improving environmental awareness of consumers and citizens through environmental education.

== Labor Union ==
=== The History and Major Events of Korean Labor Unions ===
The history of labor unions in Korea has developed in various forms through constant struggles by workers and changes in national policies over time. Labor union activities in Korea date back to the late 19th century, when the number of dock workers began to increase.

After liberation in 1945, nationwide organizations began to emerge under government control. The first nationwide organization formed by Korean workers was the Korean Confederation of Labor Unions (Jeonpyeong), established in 1945. During the turbulent post-liberation period, workers voluntarily gathered to assert their rights, marking an important moment in labor history.However, after the establishment of the government and the Korean War, labor unions were mainly formed within individual companies under strong state control, leading to the dominance of the enterprise-based union system until 1987.

Following the April Revolution of 1960, a democratization movement led by students, the wave of change also reached the labor sector. The only labor organization at the time, the Federation of Korean Trade Unions (FKTU), was criticized for being too close to the government. As a result, workers began to call for the democratization of labor unions, realizing that unions should truly represent workers’ voices free from external influence.

The 1980s were a period of intense aspiration for democratization in Korean society. In particular, the June Democratic Uprising of 1987 greatly empowered the labor movement. The long-suppressed awareness of workers’ rights erupted, leading to large scale strikes and demonstrations across the country a movement known as the Great Workers’ Struggle. During this period, numerous new unions were established, and workers strongly asserted their legitimate rights, marking a major turning point in Korean labor history.

After the 1987 democratization, Korean labor unions expanded rapidly, but the 1997 IMF crisis increased non-regular employment and job insecurity, leading to a gradual decline in unionization. By 2023, union membership reached 2.737 million with an organization rate of 13.0%, a slight 0.5% increase in members from the previous year. However, as the number of eligible workers grew faster, the unionization rate still fell by 0.1 percentage points, showing the continued struggle of unions to maintain influence in a changing labor market.

=== The Federation of Korean Trade Unions (FKTU) ===
Federation of Korean Trade Unions|The Federation of Korean Trade Unions (FKTU), established in 1960, is one of Korea’s two major national labor union organizations. It places great importance on protecting workers’ rights and interests through dialogue and negotiation, and on achieving social consensus. The FKTU has long emphasized social partnership, actively engaging in dialogue with the government and employers especially during difficult economic times.

The FKTU has been an active participant in the Tripartite Commission, which include representatives from labor, management, and the government. Through this participation, the FKTU strives to reflect workers’ voices on not only labor-related issues but also key national matters, seeking reasonable solutions through dialogue and compromise.In January 1998, during the IMF financial crisis, President Kim Daejung launched the Tripartite Commission to overcome the national crisis. Unlike the Korean Confederation of Trade Unions (KCTU), the FKTU chose to participate, demonstrating a willingness to cooperate and find solutions. Since then, the Tripartite Commission, which includes the FKTU, the Korea Enterprises Federation (KEF), and the Ministry of Labor, has continued to operate as a permanent legal institution.

During times of national financial or economic crisis, the FKTU has often shown a cooperative stance, joining efforts with the government and employers to overcome difficulties. In particular, during the 1997 IMF crisis, the FKTU played a crucial role in protecting jobs and revitalizing the economy through its participation in the Tripartite Commission. This led to the first-ever grand social compromise in Korean constitutional history, achieved in just 20 days, after which the commission was formally institutionalized.

In recent years, the FKTU has also participated in social pacts involving labor, management, the government, and local communities to discuss practical measures for job retention and sharing, as well as government support policies to overcome economic downturns. This reflects the FKTU’s recognition that labor movements should pursue not only wage increases but also broader social goals through collective effort.

=== The Korean Confederation of Trade Unions (KCTU) ===
Korean Confederation of Trade Unions|The Korean Confederation of Trade Unions (KCTU) emerged as a result of the revitalized labor movement following the 1987 Democratization Movement. Rooted in a critical stance toward the government and capital (business sector), the KCTU strongly pursues direct struggle and social reform to protect and advance workers’ rights.

After the 1987 democratization, Korean workers sought to break away from the state controlled union system and achieve genuine labor liberation through their own power. Within this atmosphere, the KCTU grew rapidly, and the labor politics movement which emphasized the political participation of workers became active. This laid the foundation for the working class to emerge as a significant social force with the official establishment of the KCTU in 1995.

The KCTU tends to rely more on direct collective actions such as strikes and demonstrations rather than dialogue with the government or corporations, in order to push forward its demands. This approach reflects the organization’s ideological background, which aims not only to address issues within individual companies but also to challenge the structural problems of capitalist society and promote broader social transformation. In February 1999, the KCTU withdrew from the Tripartite Commission and did not participate again until 2012, demonstrating its willingness to reject institutionalized dialogue and maintain an independent struggle-oriented stance in certain situations. Studies analyzing the collective actions of workers in Ulsan, a major industrial city, also highlight how workers have resisted in various forms over the past 30 years, reinforcing the militant nature of the KCTU’s labor movement.

The KCTU places strong emphasis on union autonomy and workers’ solidarity. It promotes a structure in which union activists take the lead, and workers make decisions and act independently without external interference. This principle is often described as a form of “militant democracy,” reflecting the KCTU’s readiness to take assertive even confrontational actions to defend democracy and workers’ rights. However, some critics argue that the KCTU’s labor movement can be too factional or centered on regular workers in large enterprises, rather than being fully inclusive of the broader and more diverse working class.

== See also ==
- Censorship in South Korea
- Conservatism in South Korea
- Liberalism in South Korea
- Progressivism in South Korea
- Political scandals in South Korea
- Law of South Korea
- Government of South Korea
