= Next South Korean legislative election =

- No later than 12 April 2028
- All 300 seats in the National Assembly; 151 seats needed for a majority
Party	Leader	Current seats
Democratic	Kim Min-seok	161
People Power	Jang Dong-hyeok	107
Rebuilding Korea	Shin Jang-sik	12
Progressive	Kim Jong-hoon	4
Reform	Lee Ki-in (ERC)	3
Basic Income	Oh Jun-ho	1
Social Democratic	Song Chi-yong	1
Independents	–	6 (Note: including Speaker of the National Assembly, Cho Jeong-sik)
Incumbent Speaker
Cho Jeong-sik; Independent

Legislative elections are to be held in South Korea no later than 12 April 2028. All 300 members of the National Assembly will be elected, 254 from first-past-the-post constituencies and 46 from proportional party lists.

== Electoral system ==
The National Assembly's 300 seats are elected by the following methods:

- 254 constituency seats are elected via first-past-the-post voting
- 46 seats are elected by proportional representation via the additional member system and largest remainder method.

The minimum voting age is set at 18.

== Political parties ==
Parties	Leader	Ideology	Seats		Status
Parties	Leader	Ideology	Last election	Before election	Status
Democratic Party	Kim Min-seok	Liberalism	161 / 300	161 / 300	Government
Democratic Party	Kim Min-seok	Liberalism	10 / 300 (Note: As the Democratic Alliance of Korea satellite party and two affiliated independents.)	161 / 300	Government
People Power Party	Jang Dong-hyeok	National conservatism	90 / 300	109 / 300	Opposition
People Power Party	Jang Dong-hyeok	National conservatism	18 / 300 (Note: As the People Future Party satellite party.)	109 / 300	Opposition
Rebuilding Korea Party	Shin Jang-sik	Liberalism	12 / 300	12 / 300	Opposition
Progressive Party	Kim Jae-yeon	Progressivism	3 / 300	4 / 300	Opposition
Reform Party	Lee Ki-in (ERC)	Libertarian conservatism	3 / 300	3 / 300	Opposition
Basic Income Party	Oh Jun-ho	Universal basic income	2 / 300 (Note: As the New Progressive Alliance coalition)	1 / 300	Opposition
Social Democratic Party	Han Chang-min	Social democracy	2 / 300	1 / 300	Opposition
New Future Democratic Party	Jun Byung-hun	Centrist reformism	1 / 300	0 / 300	Opposition

== Opinion polls ==
LOESS curve for the 2028 South Korean legislative election with a 14-day average
