= Open Democratic Party (2022) =

Political party in South Korea

Open Democratic Party 열린민주당
- Abbreviation: Open Party; ODP
- Leader: Kim In-tae (ERC)
- Founder: Kim Sang-gyun
- Founded: 18 December 2022
- Registered: 23 December 2022
- Preceded by: Open Democratic Party
- Headquarters: 78 Daerim-ro, Yeongdeungpo-gu, Seoul
- Membership (2024): 6,243
- Ideology: Liberalism; Social liberalism
- Colours: Blue; Yellow

Website
- openminju.co.kr

Korean name
- Hangul: 열린민주당
- Hanja: 열린民主黨
- RR: Yeollin minjudang
- MR: Yŏllin minjudang

The Open Democratic Party (Korean: 열린민주당) is a South Korean political party within the democratic camp, founded in December 2022 by some members of the original Open Democratic Party who opposed its merger with the Democratic Party of Korea.

== History ==
On 18 December 2022, a political party named the "Open Democratic Party" was formed and was registered by the National Election Commission on 23 December 2022. This party uses the same logo, party colors, and slogans as the disbanded 2020 Open Democratic Party. The recreation is led by YouTuber-turned-politician Kim Sang-gyun and does not include any of the former party leaders from the 2020 rendition. The 2022 rendition of the Open Democratic Party's founding committee expressed that it would succeed the existing Open Democratic Party in terms of not only the party name but also the platform and policies in order to realise the reform values of the past Open Democratic Party that could not be realised.

Kim Sang-gyun stated his intention was for the party to replace the Justice Party.

The party adopted the name and logo of the 2020 Open Democratic Party with permission from former lawmaker Sohn Hye-won.

It joined a coalition with the Basic Income Party and Social Democratic Party to create the New Progressive Alliance for the 2024 South Korean legislative election. The New Progressive Alliance in turn participated in the Democratic Alliance of Korea with the Democratic Party of Korea and the Progressive Party.

== Logos ==
Logo of the Open Democratic Party

Alternate Orientation of the Open Democratic Party logo
