= Korean Solidarity of Civilian Military Employees =

South Korean labour rights advocacy group

- Abbreviation: KSCME
- Formation: 10 February 2025
- Type: Advocacy group
- Region served: South Korea
- Representative: Son Dong-hwa
- Website: nmcws.org

Korean name
- Hangul: 전국군무원연대
- Hanja: 全國軍務員連帶
- RR: Jeonguk gunmuwon yeondae
- MR: Chŏn'guk kunmuwŏn yŏndae

The Korean Solidarity of Civilian Military Employees (KSCME; Korean: 전국군무원연대) is a South Korean advocacy organization for civilian employees of the Republic of Korea Armed Forces. Founded on 10 February 2025, it advocates labour rights, improved working conditions and protection of these employees' civilian status. In August 2026, it jointly submitted a complaint to the International Labour Organization (ILO) alleging violations of civilian military employees' rights to freedom of association and collective bargaining.

== Background and formation ==
Civilian military employees in South Korea are civilian public officials who work in military units and agencies in administrative, technical, research and logistical roles. According to the Ministry of National Defense, civilian military employees are assigned non-combat duties, while active-duty military personnel perform combat duties. The United States and the United Kingdom also employ civilian personnel to support their armed forces.

The organization grew out of a 2023 petition to the National Assembly seeking changes to laws governing civilian military employees' rights and working conditions. Son Dong-hwa led the campaign. The petition gathered at least 50,000 signatures and was referred to the National Defense Committee. According to the organization's founding materials, its organizers met on 22 January 2025 and completed registration procedures on 3 February.

Current and former civilian military employees publicly announced KSCME's formation on 10 February 2025, together with the Center for Military Human Rights Korea, the State Public Officials' Labor Union and the Korean Government Employees' Union. At the founding press conference, the group said it would gather employees' views, challenge work orders it considered unfair and seek legal changes that would allow it to become a workplace council or trade union.

== Objectives ==
KSCME calls for a clear distinction between the status and duties of civilian military employees and those of military personnel. It opposes what it describes as the militarization of civilian staff, including their assignment to duties intended for combat personnel.

Its proposals include allowing civilian military employees to establish and join workplace councils and trade unions, ending the application of the Framework Act on Military Status and Service to them, and exempting them from the Military Criminal Act in peacetime. It also seeks greater use of civilian employees' professional expertise and opportunities for them to serve in defence policy roles in the Ministry of National Defense and other policy-making bodies.

== Activities ==
=== Labour rights ===
On 12 May 2026, KSCME launched a signature-gathering campaign in support of its proposals for civilian military employees' labour rights and working conditions.

On 15 May 2026, the organization announced plans to file a complaint against the South Korean government with the ILO's Committee on Freedom of Association. It argued that civilian military employees were excluded from public-sector trade-union legislation despite their civilian status. The Ministry of National Defense responded that their status as members of the armed forces subjected them to restrictions on labour organizations and union activities under military service legislation. It also said that it had no plans to assign combat duties to civilian employees.

On 14 August 2026, KSCME, the Korean Government Employees' Union and the State Public Officials' Labor Union submitted the complaint. They alleged that the government's refusal to recognize civilian military employees' freedom of association and right to collective bargaining violated ILO Conventions Nos. 87 and 98, and called for legislative changes and a review of Son Dong-hwa's military trial.

The complaint also alleged that civilian employees had been assigned to shooting drills, cold-weather training and troop roll calls. It stated that, during a joint South Korean–US military exercise in March 2026, employees at a unit under the Army's First Logistics Support Command had been required to wear helmets and full battle gear and take on a covering-fire role.

=== Policy proposals and cooperation ===
On 27 May 2025, KSCME signed a policy agreement with the policy division of the Democratic Party of Korea's central election campaign committee ahead of the 2025 South Korean presidential election. According to the Center for Military Human Rights Korea, the agreement covered protection of civilian military employees' status, improved working conditions and better use of their expertise.

=== Service regulations and working conditions ===
KSCME and the Center for Military Human Rights Korea have opposed applying military haircut regulations to civilian employees. In October 2025, the rights centre reported that an employee of the Army's Capital Corps had received a two-month pay cut for failing to comply with the regulations. In April 2026, MBC reported that a two-month pay cut imposed on one employee had been reduced to one month on review. In May, it reported that another employee's penalty had been reduced to a reprimand. KSCME challenged the legal basis for applying the same haircut regulations to soldiers and civilian staff, and said it would consider administrative litigation and constitutional challenges.

On 26 August 2026, the Ministry of National Defense issued guidance removing hair-length restrictions for civilian military employees while retaining a requirement that their hair be kept neat. KSCME welcomed the change and called for wider reform of practices that it said treated civilian employees as combat personnel. As of September 2026, one of the disciplined employees was pursuing an administrative lawsuit challenging the reduced penalty.

On 10 September 2026, MBC reported that the Army had expanded a five-day physical fitness programme to include civilian military employees. KSCME objected to requiring non-combatant civilian staff to participate in training aimed at improving combat fitness and called for their exemption and a review of the basis for requiring their participation. The Army said the programme was intended to improve fitness and unit cohesion, and rejected its characterization as coercive, high-intensity training. It acknowledged shortcomings in communication about civilian participation at some units and said it would change how the programme was run.

== Prosecution of Son Dong-hwa and allegations of retaliation ==
KSCME representative Son Dong-hwa was investigated by the Defense Counterintelligence Command over allegations that he had disclosed internal documents concerning restrictions on iPhone use in military security areas. In April 2026, military prosecutors indicted him under the Military Criminal Act on charges relating to the alleged disclosure and political involvement.

The Center for Military Human Rights Korea, KSCME and public-sector unions alleged that the prosecution was retaliation for Son's campaign for civilian military employees' rights. At a press conference on 20 April 2026, the centre argued that the information at issue had already been reported in the media and that the prosecution was intended to discourage advocacy for better working conditions.

On 6 May 2026, a civilian personnel committee at the Republic of Korea Air Force's 5th Air Mobility Wing rejected a proposal to suspend Son from his post. MBC reported that the committee found little connection between the charges and his duties and no problems with his work performance. The Air Force said its decision took account of the relationship between the charges and his duties, their effect on his ability to work, and his right to defend himself.
