= KGEU =

KGEU may refer to:

- Glendale Municipal Airport (ICAO: KGEU), Maricopa County, Arizona
- Korean Government Employees' Union, labor union in South Korea
