= 2028 =

2028 in various calendars
- Gregorian calendar: 2028; MMXXVIII
- Ab urbe condita: 2781
- Armenian calendar: 1477; ԹՎ ՌՆՀԷ
- Assyrian calendar: 6778
- Baháʼí calendar: 184–185
- Balinese saka calendar: 1949–1950
- Bengali calendar: 1434–1435
- Berber calendar: 2978
- British Regnal year: N/A
- Buddhist calendar: 2572
- Burmese calendar: 1390
- Byzantine calendar: 7536–7537
- Chinese calendar: 丁未年 (Fire Goat); 4725 or 4518 — to — 戊申年 (Earth Monkey); 4726 or 4519
- Coptic calendar: 1744–1745
- Discordian calendar: 3194
- Ethiopian calendar: 2020–2021
- Hebrew calendar: 5788–5789
- Hindu calendars
- Vikram Samvat: 2084–2085
- Shaka Samvat: 1949–1950
- Kali Yuga: 5128–5129
- Holocene calendar: 12028
- Igbo calendar: 1028–1029
- Iranian calendar: 1406–1407
- Islamic calendar: 1449–1450
- Japanese calendar: Reiwa 10 (令和１０年)
- Javanese calendar: 1961–1962
- Juche calendar: 117
- Julian calendar: Gregorian minus 13 days
- Korean calendar: 4361
- Minguo calendar: ROC 117 民國117年
- Nanakshahi calendar: 560
- Thai solar calendar: 2571
- Tibetan calendar: མེ་མོ་ལུག་ལོ་ (female Fire-Sheep); 2154 or 1773 or 1001 — to — ས་ཕོ་སྤྲེ་ལོ་ (male Earth-Monkey); 2155 or 1774 or 1002
- Unix time: 1830297600 – 1861919999

2028 (MMXXVIII) will be a leap year starting on Saturday of the Gregorian calendar, the 2028th year of the Common Era (CE) and Anno Domini (AD) designations, the 28th year of the 3rd millennium and the 21st century, and the 9th year of the 2020s decade.

== Predicted and scheduled events ==
- January 5–30 – The first FIFA Women's Club World Cup is scheduled to be held.
- January 15–29 – The 2028 Winter Youth Olympics will be held in Italy.
- February 13 – Super Bowl LXII will be played at Mercedes-Benz Stadium, in Atlanta, Georgia, United States.
- February 20 – The 2028 NBA All-Star Game will be held in Oklahoma City, United States in Paycom Center.
- April 12 – If not triggered earlier, the next South Korean legislative election will be held no later than this date.
- May - Eurovision Song Contest 2028, host determined by the 2027 winner.
- May 8 – The 2028 Philippine presidential election is scheduled to be held.
- May 14
  - If not triggered earlier, the next Turkish presidential election will be held no later than this date.
  - June 9–July 9 – The UEFA Euro 2028 tournament will be hosted in England, Scotland, Wales, and the Republic of Ireland.
- June 5 – US v. Khalid Sheikh Mohammed: The trial of Khalid Sheikh Mohammed and 3 other Al-Qaeda members involved in the September 11 attacks is scheduled to be held on this date.
- July 5–25 – NASA's Dragonfly mission, or New Frontiers 4 will be launched to explore Saturn's moon, Titan, from a SpaceX Falcon Heavy.
- July 14–30 – The 2028 Summer Olympics will be held in Los Angeles, California, US.
- July 22 – A total solar eclipse will be visible across Australia, including Sydney, and New Zealand.
- August 15–27 – The 2028 Summer Paralympics will be held in Los Angeles, California, US.
- September 28 – If not triggered earlier, the next Australian federal election will be held no later than this date.
- November 7 – The 2028 United States presidential election will be held.

=== Date unknown ===
- May – The 2028 Lebanese general election is scheduled to be held.
- June–December – The Jeddah Tower will most likely be completed within this time period. It will surpass the Burj Khalifa and become the new tallest building in the world.
- Japanese scientists will grow human babies in the lab, by incubating eggs and sperm in an artificial womb, years after they tested on mice with drugs.
- NASA is targeting the first two thirds of 2028 to launch Artemis IV, the first crewed lunar landing since 1972, and the last third of 2028 to launch Artemis V, the second crewed lunar landing since 1972.
- The lease on the Moldauhafen port lot in Hamburg, Germany, to the Czech Republic is set to expire.
- The 54th International Eucharistic Congress will be held in Sydney, Australia.
- The 2028 ICC Men's T20 World Cup is scheduled to be held in Australia and New Zealand.
- Nusantara is set to replace Jakarta as the new capital of Indonesia.
- Colossal Biosciences aim to birth the first generation of woolly mammoths and reintroduce them to the arctic (Alaska, Yukon, and Pleistocene Park) in semi-captivity 4,000 years after the species went extinct.
