= SLU =

SLU may refer to:

== Universities ==
- St. Lawrence University, Canton, New York, US
- Saint Louis University (Philippines), Baguio City, Benguet
- Saint Louis University (United States), St. Louis, Missouri, US
- Shenyang Ligong University, in Shenyang, Liaoning, China
- Sveriges Lantbruksuniversitet (Swedish University of Agricultural Sciences), Uppsala

== Places ==
- George F. L. Charles Airport, Castries, Saint Lucia, IATA code
- Siu Lun stop, Hong Kong, MTR station code
- South Lake Union, Seattle
- Sulu, Philippines, ISO provincial code

== Other ==
- Special Liaison Unit, delivering WWII Ultra intelligence
- Schedule loss of use
- Sociedad de la responsabilidad limitada unipersonal, a Spanish single-person limited liability company
- Sociedad de la responsabilidad limitada unipersonal, a Spanish single-person limited liability company
- The State Public Officials' Labor Union is a South Korean trade union representing public officials employed by central government ministries, agencies and commissions.
