= Kang Mi-jeong =

South Korean announcer and politician (born 1984)

- 강미정
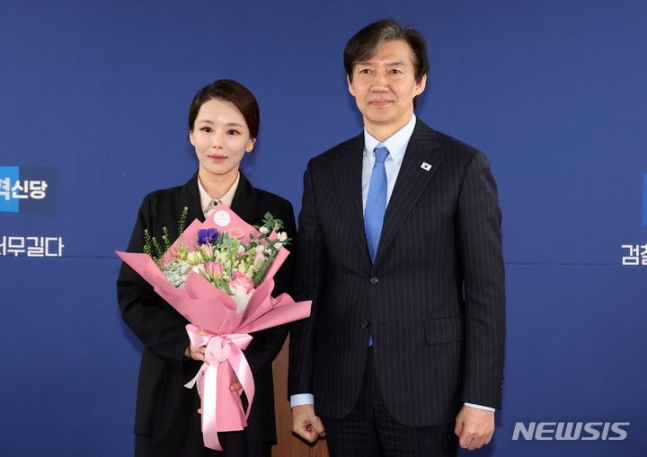
- Kang (left)

Spokesperson for the Rebuilding Korea Party
- In office 2024 – September 2025

Chairperson of the Uijeongbu regional committee of the Rebuilding Korea Party
- In office March 2025 – September 2025

Personal details
- Born: May 28, 1984 (age 42)
- Citizenship: South Korea
- Party: Independent (2025–)
- Other political affiliations: Rebuilding Korea Party (2024–2025)

Kang Mi-jeong (Korean: 강미정, born 28 May 1984) is a South Korean politician and former broadcaster who served as a spokesperson and later the Uijeongbu regional committee chairperson for the Rebuilding Korea Party.

== History ==
Kang is a former announcer and broadcaster. In 2024, she joined the Rebuilding Korea Party, and became a party spokesperson and, in 2025, chairperson of the Uijeongbu regional committee. She later resigned and left the party following what she called the lukewarm response to a series of sexual harassment and workplace bullying cases that took place within the party since last year.

=== Broadcasting ===
She appeared on MBC's Sunday Night segment "New Recruit." She also worked as an announcer on MBC Live Morning, KBS Good Morning Korea and Defense FM Joyful Barracks.
