= Health Insurance Review and Assessment Service =

- 건강보험심사평가원

Agency overview
- Formed: 1 July 2000
- Jurisdiction: Government of South Korea
- Headquarters: Wonju, Gangwon Province, South Korea
- Agency executive: Kim Sunmin, President
- Parent department: Ministry of Health and Welfare
- Website: http://www.hira.or.kr/eng/main.do

Korean name
- Hangul: 건강보험심사평가원
- Hanja: 健康保險審査評價院
- RR: Geongang boheom simsa pyeonggawon
- MR: Kŏn'gang pohŏm simsa p'yŏngkawŏn

The Health Insurance Review and Assessment Service (HIRA; Korean: 건강보험심사평가원) is a government agency under Ministry of Health and Welfare responsible for claims review and quality assessment of the National Health Insurance. Since its foundation, its role has expanded as it has become a specialised agency with delegated powers related to health insurance and healthcare from the Ministry. Its head with fixed 3 year term is nominated by the Minister upon the recommendations from nomination committee and appointed by the President.

It has its headquarters in Wonju and 10 branch offices across the nation.

== What HIRA does ==
Health Insurance Review & Assessment Service (HIRA) ensures to build a sustainable and high-performing healthcare system in Korea.

HIRA collects and connects the health data across the country and then utilizes data for further use to create values in health. HIRA shares its knowledge and experiences with international communities to bring Universal Health Coverage to the world.

=== 1. Sustainable Health Financing ===
• Design and implement the healthcare provider payment systems

• Design the health benefits package

• Conduct the claims review to evaluate healthcare costs

• Re-review claims and providers via a follow-up review and on-site investigation

=== 2. Excellence in Quality Healthcare ===
• Use Quality Assessment to improve quality of care

• Encourage providers to take more steps toward quality improvement

• Designate tertiary hospitals with quality assessment results

=== 3. Maximizing the Value of Health Data ===
• Collect, Connect, and Utilize nationwide data in healthcare

• Play a key role in creating added value

- Drug Management (KPIS / DUR)

- Health Resources Management

- Healthcare Utilization Monitoring Dashboard

=== 4. Bringing Sustainable Universal Health Coverage to the World ===
• Collaborate with various international organizations

• Provide consultation and capacity-building programs

- Expert Consulting

- Capacity Building Program

== HIRA in response to COVID-19 ==
Building off of the MERS crisis in 2015, laws and systems were put in place to rapidly respond to the threat of emerging epidemic outbreaks. HIRA utilized tools and skills that enable a rapid and flexible approach to dealing with COVID-19.

With data from patients and providers nationwide, HIRA contributes to preventing spread, detecting and treating cases early, and responding quickly to the surge capacity of the healthcare system.

HIRA ICT system is connected with all healthcare facilities and pharmacies across the country for claims and reimbursement purposes. HIRA has widened the use of this interconnected system piece-bypiece over the last several decades, developing it into a multi-functional network. HIRA have taken full advantage of the existing systems and can adapt their functionality swiftly according what is needed during an outbreak.

=== • Early detection & treatment of confirmed cases ===
- Detection of high-risk groups using DUR/ITS

- Expanding health benefits package rapidly

- Responding quickly to surge capacity through resource reallocation

=== • Preventing transmission of COVID-19 ===
- Stabilizing the protective face mask supply

- “National Safe Hospital” designation (COVID-19 Protection Hospital)

=== • National COVID-19 Data Warehouse ===
- National COVID-19 Patient Data Repository

- COVID-19 Global Research Collaboration Platform

== History ==
- 1963 : Enactment of the Health Insurance Act
- 1976 : Revision of the Health Insurance Act to include mandatory health insurance enrolment of the population
- 1977 : Introduction of mandatory social health insurance (National Health Insurance) for workers in large corporations with 500+ employees
- 1989 : Expansion of National Health Insurance coverage to all citizens
- 1999 : Legislation of the National Health Insurance Act, Expansion of EDI claim submission to the whole nation
- 2000 : Establishment of the Health Insurance Review & Assessment Service (HIRA), responsible for claims review and quality assessment of the National Health Insurance
- 2003 : Establishment of DW system (healthcare data analysis system)
- 2005 : Entrusted with claims review for government-assisted medical program for the disadvantaged (Medical Aid)
- 2008 : Entrusted with claims review for Veterans Hospitals
- 2010 : Expansion of DUR to the whole nation
- 2011 : Web-based Benefit Claim Portal
- 2013 : Entrusted with claims review for auto insurance
- 2015 : Relocation of HIRA headquarters from Seoul to Wonju
- 2017 : Kingdom of Bahrain's SEHATI-IT Reform Project (Implementation of National Social Health Insurance Scheme)
- 2020 : Advancement of the Review and Assessment system COVID-19 countermeasure support

== See also ==
- Healthcare in South Korea
