= Kim Sunmin =

South Korean health care expert

- 김선민
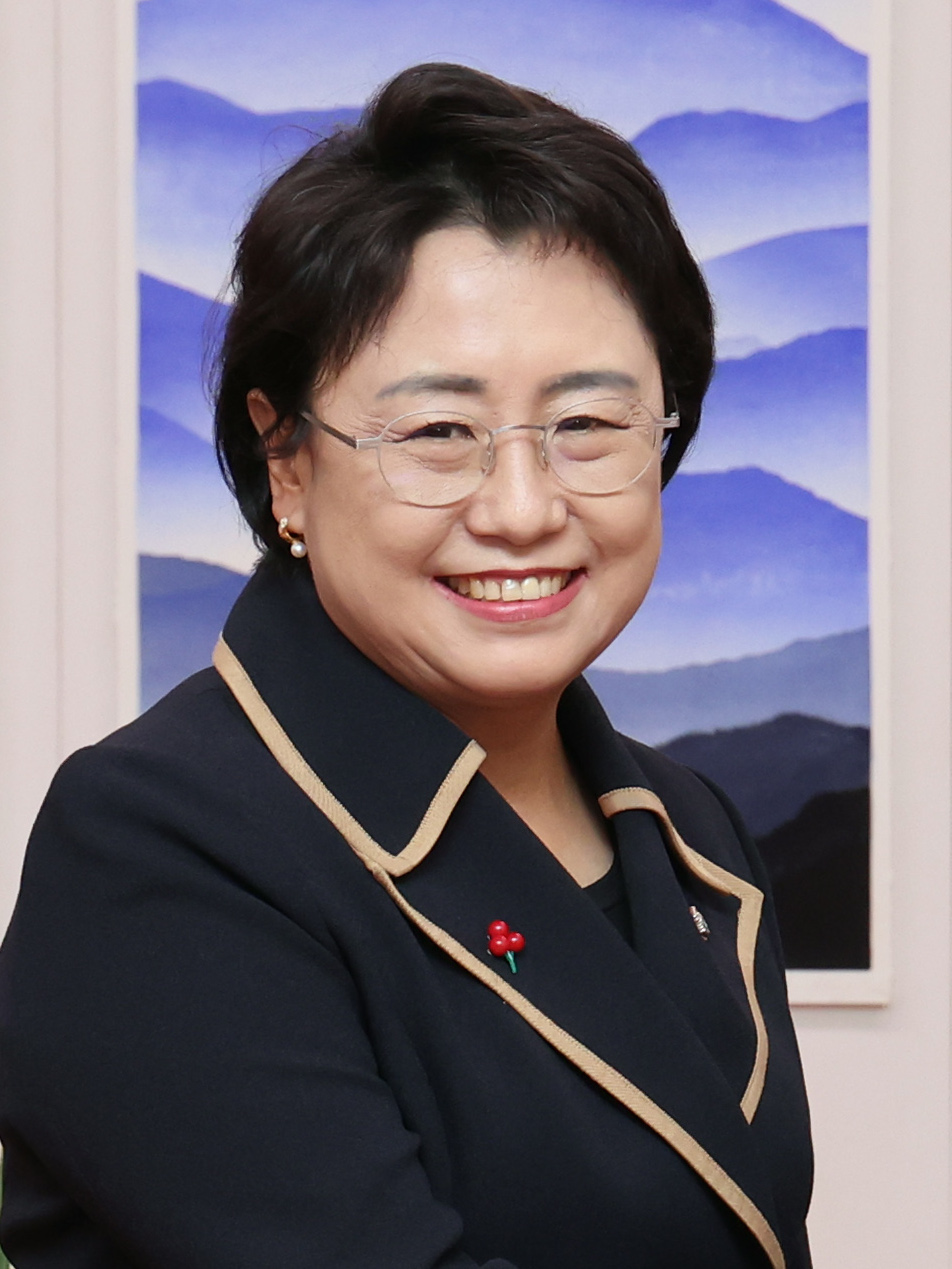
- Kim in 2024

Leader of the Rebuilding Korea Party
- Acting
- In office 12 December 2024 – 7 September 2025
- Preceded by: Cho Kuk
- Succeeded by: Cho Kuk (ERC)

President of Health Insurance Review & Assessment Service
- In office 21 April 2020 – 12 March 2023
- President: Moon Jae-in
- Minister: Park Neung-hoo; Kwon Deok-chul

Personal details
- Born: 24 May 1964 (age 62) Seoul, South Korea
- Education: Seoul National University

Kim Sunmin (Korean: 김선민; Hanja: 金宣旼; born 24 May 1964) is a South Korean health care expert and politician who served as the acting leader of the Rebuilding Korea Party from 2024 to 2025. Previously, she served as the President of Health Insurance Review & Assessment Service (HIRA) from April 2020 to March 2023. She was the first woman to lead HIRA since its creation in 2000. Before being promoted as its 10th president, Kim was the Executive Director of Planning for HIRA, the agency's de facto vice-president.

Kim's background consists primarily of work in various inter-government and government institutions. She was a senior researcher at Korea Health Industry Development Institute from 1999 to 2001 and human rights researcher at National Human Rights Commission from 2001 to 2004. She took numerous roles in HIRA since 2006 when she was first joined the institution as a member of its Review and Assessment Committee. She also worked as a senior technical officer at World Health Organization's Department of Service Delivery and Safety from 2016 to 2018.

Kim represented HIRA and Korea at OECD Health Care Quality and Outcome (HCQO) Working Group from 2009 and became its chair in 2018 becoming the first Asian-country-national and first woman to lead the HCQO Working Group.

She holds three degrees from Seoul National University - M.D and master's and doctorate in preventative medicine. She was previously an assistant professor at Hallym University and affiliate professor at Catholic University of Korea.

== Election results ==
Year	Elections	Constituency	Political party	Votes (%)	Results
2024	22nd National Assembly General Election	Proportional representation (5th)	Rebuilding Korea Party	6,874,278 (24.25%)	Elected
