= Shin Jang-sik =

South Korean politician (born 1971)

- 신장식
- Shin in 2026

Leader of the Rebuilding Korea Party
- Incumbent
- Assumed office 25 July 2026
- Preceded by: Kim Joon-hyung (acting)
- Acting; 4 June 2026 – 7 July 2026
- Preceded by: Cho Kuk
- Succeeded by: Kim Joon-hyung (acting)

Secretary-General of the Justice Party
- In office July 2017 – July 2019
- Preceded by: Lee Hyuk-jae
- Succeeded by: Kwon Tae-hong

Member of the National Assembly
- Incumbent
- Assumed office 30 May 2024
- Constituency: Proportional representation

Personal details
- Born: May 25, 1971 (age 55)
- Party: Rebuilding Korea Party (2024–)
- Other political affiliations: Independent (1998–2000; 2008; 2010–2016; 2023–2024); Democratic Labor Party (2000–2008); New Progressive Party (2008–2010); Justice Party (2016–2023)

Shin Jang-sik (Korean: 신장식, born 25 May 1971) is a South Korean politician and former lawyer. He is a member of the 22nd National Assembly.

He ran for a local council seat in Gwanak-gu, Seoul (Bongcheon-dong) in the 1998 local elections but was unsuccessful. He also ran for the National Assembly representing the Gwanak-gu Eul district—as a candidate for the Democratic Labor Party in 2004 and for the New Progressive Party in 2008—but failed to win in each instance. He served as the chair of the Planning Committee for the Democratic Labor Party and as a spokesperson for the New Progressive Party. He joined the Justice Party in February 2016 and served as its third Secretary-General from July 2017 to July 2019.

He hosted News High Kick on MBC Standard FM until stepping down in 2024.

In 2024 he joined the Rebuilding Korea Party and was nominated as the fourth candidate on the proportional representation list for the 22nd National Assembly election held on 10 April 2024, and was subsequently elected as a member of the National Assembly. He served in several positions including supreme council member, deputy floor leader, floor spokesperson, senior deputy floor leader and chairman of the Vision Committee. In July 2026, he was elected as the leader of the Rebuilding Korea Party succeeding Cho Kuk.

== Election results ==
Year	Election	Assembly	Office	Constituency	Party	Votes	Vote share	Rank	Result	Notes
1998	2nd Iocal Election	2nd	District councillor	Bongcheon 9-dong, Gwanak, Seoul	Independent	1,280	25.57%	3rd	Defeated	2nd term of popularly elected local government
2000	16th National Assembly General Election	16th	Member of the National Assembly	Gwanak B, Seoul	Democratic Labor Party	8,635	8.41%	3rd	Defeated	
2004	17th National Assembly General Election	17th	Member of the National Assembly	Gwanak B, Seoul	Democratic Labor Party	13,699	11.33%	4th	Defeated	
2008	18th National Assembly General Election	18th	Member of the National Assembly	Gwanak B, Seoul	New Progressive Party	7,247	7.79%	3rd	Defeated	
2024	22nd National Assembly General Election	22nd	Member of the National Assembly	Proportional representation	Rebuilding Korea Party	6,874,278	24.25%	4th on party list	Elected	First term

== See also ==
- Rebuilding Korea Party
- Cho Kuk
- Democratic Labor Party
- New Progressive Party
- Justice Party
