= Democratic Alliance of Korea =

Democratic Alliance of Korea 더불어민주연합
- Abbreviation: DAK
- President: Yoon Young-deok; Paik Seung-ah
- Floor leader: Yoon Young-deok
- Founded: 7 March 2024
- Dissolved: 8 May 2024
- Preceded by: Platform Party (de facto)
- Political position: Centre to left-wing
- National affiliation: Democratic Party of Korea; New Progressive Alliance; Progressive Party

Website
- theminjoounion.kr

The Democratic Alliance of Korea (Korean: 더불어민주연합) was an electoral alliance and political party formed in order to run for party-list proportional representation in the 2024 South Korean legislative election. It consisted of 3 centrist to left-wing parties and alliances — the Democratic Party of Korea, the Progressive Party and the New Progressive Alliance. It only nominated proportional representation candidates in the 2024 South Korean election. On May 2, 2024, the Democratic Alliance, excluding members of the Progressive Party and New Progressive Alliance, merged into the Democratic Party of Korea.

== Member parties ==
Name	Ideology	Position	Leader	MPs	Entry
Party
Democratic Party	Liberalism	Centre to centre-left	Lee Jae-myung	8 / 300	3 March 2024
Progressive Party	Progressivism; Left-wing nationalism	Left-wing to far-left	Yun Hee-suk	3 / 300	3 March 2024
New Progressive Alliance •Basic Income Party •Open Democratic Party •Social Democratic Party	Universal basic income Liberalism; Social liberalism	N/A	Yong Hye-in; Oh Joon-ho	2 / 300	3 March 2024

=== Refused to join ===
Despite receiving an invitation from the Democratic Party, the Green Justice Party declined to participate in the electoral alliance due to their stance against the formation of satellite parties.

Name	Ideology	Position	Leaders	MPs	References
Party
Green Justice Party •Justice Party •Green Party Korea	Green politics Progressivism	Centre-left to left-wing	Kim Joon-woo; Kim Chan-hwee	0 / 300	

== Candidates ==
List number	Candidates	Endorser party
1	Seo Mi-hwa	United Political Citizens Assembly
2	Wi Sung-rak	Democratic Party
3	Baek Seung-a	Democratic Party
4	Lim Gwang-hyeon	Democratic Party
5	Jeong Hye-kyung	Progressive Party
6	Yong Hye-in	New Progressive Alliance (Basic Income Party)
7	Oh Se-hee	Democratic Party
8	Park Hong-bae	Democratic Party
9	Kang You-jung	Democratic Party
10	Han Chang-min	New Progressive Alliance (Social Democratic Party)
11	Jeon Jong-deok	Progressive Party
12	Kim Yoon	United Political Citizens Assembly
13	Lim Mi-ae	Democratic Party
14	Jeong Eul-ho	Democratic Party
15	Son Sol	Progressive Party
16	Choi Hyuk-jin	New Progressive Alliance
17	Lee Ju-hee	United Political Citizens Assembly
18	Kim Jun-hwan	Democratic Party
19	Go Jae-soon	Democratic Party
20	Kim Young-hun	United Political Citizens Assembly
21	Kwak Eun-mi	Democratic Party
22	Cho Won-hee	Democratic Party
23	Baek Hye-sook	Democratic Party
24	Seo Seoung-man	Democratic Party
25	Jeon Ye-hyun	Democratic Party
26	Seo Jae-heon	Democratic Party
27	Heo So-young	Democratic Party
28	Chpi Young-seung	Democratic Party
29	Kang Gyeong-yoon	Democratic Party
30	Song Chang-wook	Democratic Party

== Criticism ==
The inclusion of the Progressive Party was heavily criticised, as it is considered de facto successor of the Unified Progressive Party (UPP) that was banned for its pro-North Korean allegiance despite its denial to the claims. Han Dong-hoon, the interim President of the People Power Party (PPP), denounced the coalition as "the combination of the privileged (socialist) activists, radical supporters of Lee Jae-myung, pro-North Korean UPPs and Cho Kuk". Several pre-candidates, including Lee Rae-kyung and Cho Sung-woo, were alleged to be conspiracy theorists.

Lee Sang-heon, the MP for Buk, Ulsan, announced his withdrawal from the Democratic Party following the Democratic Alliance's decision to support for Yoon Jong-oh, a member of the Progressive Party as well as the former MP for the constituency.

On 14 February 2024, the Democratic Alliance rejected the nomination of Lim Tae-hoon, former chair and founder of the Military Human Rights Commission, for a spot on the proportional representation list. The reason given by the Democratic Party was that Lim had been arrested in the early 2000s for evading military conscription, which is required by law for all men in South Korea. Lim, who is openly gay, would also have been the Democratic Party's first sexual minority in a national election. Some members of the Democratic Party hold social conservative opinions. The Democratic Party also rejected an appeal from Lim, despite conscientious objection being legalized in 2018. Lim was pardoned by President Roh in 2005 and thus founded the Military Human Rights Commission in 2009.

Hours after the announcement of the rejection of candidate Lim, the civil society and human rights groups within the electoral alliance threatened to withdraw their support and candidates from the electoral alliance on 14 February 2024.

== Election results ==
Election	Leader	Constituency			Party list			Seats	Position	Status
Election	Leader	Votes	%	Seats	Votes	%	Seats	Seats	Position	Status
2024	Yoon Young-deok; Paik Seung-ah				7,567,459	26.70	14 / 46	14 / 300	2nd	Opposition
