= Seo Mi-hwa =

South Korean politician (born 1967)

- 서미화
- Seo in 2026

Member of the National Assembly
- Incumbent
- Assumed office May 30, 2024
- Constituency: Proportional representation

Personal details
- Born: November 6, 1967 (age 58)
- Party: Democratic Party (2014–2024, 2024–)
- Other political affiliations: Democratic Party (2010–2011); Democratic Party (2011–2014); Democratic Alliance of Korea (2024)

Seo Mi-hwa (Korean: 서미화, 6 November 1967) is a South Korean human rights activist and politician. She is a member of the 22nd National Assembly.

== Education ==
Mi-hwa has a bachelor’s degree in social welfare from Mokpo National University, a Master’s Degree in social welfare from Dongshin University., and a Ph.D. in social welfare from Chosun University.

== History ==
She served as director of the Mokpo Sexual Violence Counselling Centre for Women with Disabilities. She later became chairperson of the National Sexual Violence Counselling Committee of the Korea Federation of Women with Disabilities.

On 2 June 2010, she was elected in the 2010 South Korean local elections as a first-term proportional representation Democratic Party member on the Mokpo City Council, South Jeolla Province.

She later became the Non-standing Commissioner of the National Human Rights Commission of Korea from 1 May 2020 to 29 June 2023.

On 10 April 2024, she was elected in the 2024 South Korean legislative election as a first-term proportional representation member for the Democratic Alliance of Korea. The Democratic Alliance of Korea later merged into the Democratic Party following the election.

On 17 August 2026, she was elected as a member of the Democratic Party's Supreme Council at its convention.

Seo Mi-hwa has a lifelong visual impairment.

== Electoral history ==
Year	Election	Number	Office	Constituency	Party	Votes	Vote share	Rank	Result	Notes
2010	5th Iocal Election	5th	City councilor; Mokpo South Jeolla	Proportional representation	Democratic Party	57,171	64.79%	1st (proportional representation)	Elected	First term; 5th popularly elected local administration
2024	22nd National Assembly General Election	22nd	Member of the National Assembly	Proportional representation	Democratic Alliance	7,567,459	26.69%	1st (proportional representation)	Elected	First term

== Media ==
National Assembly portrait of Seo Mi-hwa

Preparing for the National Party Member Convention with Candidate Seo Mi-hwa: Behind-the-scenes of the profile shoot + 1-minute policy statement

== See also ==
- Democratic Party (South Korea, 2015)
- List of members of the National Assembly (South Korea), 2024–2028
