= Center for Military Human Rights Korea =

South Korean military human rights NGO

- 군인권센터
- Abbreviation: CMHRK
- Formation: September 23, 2009; 17 years ago
- Founder: Lim Tae-hoon
- Type: NGO
- Legal status: Human rights organization
- Purpose: Protection and promotion of the human rights of military personnel in South Korea
- Headquarters: 4F, 20, Sinchon-ro 14-gil, Mapo-gu, Seoul, Republic of Korea
- Location: South Korea
- Coordinates: 37°33′19″N 126°56′00″E
- Region served: South Korea
- Members: 1,336 paying members (December 2021)
- Official language: Korean
- Director: Lim Tae-hoon
- Subsidiaries: Sexual Assault Counseling Center
- Website: mhrk.org

Korean name
- Hangul: 군인권센터
- Hanja: 軍人權센터
- RR: Gun ingwon senteo
- MR: Kun inkwŏn sent'ŏ

The Center for Military Human Rights Korea (CMHRK; Korean: 군인권센터) is a South Korean non-governmental organization based in Seoul. It monitors alleged rights violations in the Republic of Korea Armed Forces and provides counselling and other assistance to people affected by military service. Human rights activist Lim Tae-hoon founded the organization in 2009.

CMHRK has received national coverage for its work on the 2014 death of Army conscript Yoon Seung-ju, the Army's 2017 investigation of gay soldiers, allegations concerning enlisted orderlies assigned to General Park Chan-ju's residence, military planning documents prepared during the impeachment of President Park Geun-hye, and the discharge of transgender soldier Byun Hui-su.

== History and advocacy ==
=== Founding and early work ===
CMHRK's charter gives 23 September 2009 as its establishment date, while independent reports generally identify only the year. According to its 2012 annual report, it registered with the Seoul Metropolitan Government as a non-profit civic organization on 11 September 2012.

In 2012, CMHRK petitioned the National Assembly to dismiss the former commander of the Korea Army Training Center after three trainee deaths in 2011. Contemporary reporting identified the deaths as resulting from pneumonia, suicide and meningitis. The organization also opposed the military prosecution of an Army captain for insulting a superior through social-media posts criticizing President Lee Myung-bak. The Supreme Court of Korea later upheld the captain's conviction.

In April 2012, CMHRK submitted information on military rights to the second-cycle Universal Periodic Review of South Korea. The submission is listed by the Office of the United Nations High Commissioner for Human Rights. According to its annual report, CMHRK also visited the Bangkok office of FORUM-ASIA in November 2012 and surveyed 305 soldiers on leave.

CMHRK's 2013–2016 report dates the reorganization of its counselling service under the name Armycall to January 2013. News reports in 2014 described CMHRK as preparing a larger civilian hotline with funding from the National Human Rights Commission of Korea, with a formal expansion planned for early 2015. In June 2013, CMHRK publicized the case of an Army corporal whose brain tumour was diagnosed only after a civilian examination and said it would petition the National Human Rights Commission over his access to medical care.

=== Cases from 2014 to 2019 ===
In 2014, CMHRK released investigative records concerning the death of Private Yoon Seung-ju, who had been assaulted by other soldiers. Yonhap described CMHRK as the first organization to publicize the case, while also reporting a dispute between CMHRK and the Ministry of National Defense over the cause of death and the organization's allegation that the investigation had been curtailed. CMHRK called for murder charges. Military prosecutors later amended the indictment to add a murder charge.

In December 2015, CMHRK alleged that three Air Force non-commissioned officers had assaulted and sexually abused a colleague and asked the military to reopen its investigation. In 2016, a medication error at the Armed Forces Cheongpyeong Hospital left a soldier's arm paralysed. CMHRK publicized the case and called for changes to the military medical system.

In April 2017, CMHRK alleged that Army investigators had used an inquiry into a video involving two male soldiers to identify and prosecute other gay service members. The organization said investigators had pressured soldiers to identify partners, examined mobile phones and used dating applications. The Army said it was conducting a lawful investigation and denied that it was carrying out a broader campaign against gay soldiers. Later that year, CMHRK publicized former orderlies' accounts alleging that General Park Chan-ju and his wife had mistreated enlisted personnel assigned to their residence. A Ministry of National Defense audit found support for several allegations, and the ministry announced that military orderlies at official residences would be replaced by civilian employees. Allegations concerning the treatment of the orderlies were not the basis of Park's later bribery indictment, and the abuse-related case ended without prosecution.

In July 2018, after a ruling-party lawmaker disclosed an initial Defense Security Command document describing possible troop deployments during the impeachment of Park Geun-hye, CMHRK released related planning material and filed complaints against two former commanders. President Moon Jae-in ordered an investigation, and a joint military and civilian prosecution team began work later that month. In October 2019, CMHRK released a longer document that it described as the original version. Yonhap reported the organization's account of the document, including a reference to the National Security Council.

In May 2019, CMHRK established a specialized counselling centre for people affected by sexual violence connected with the military. CMHRK's report gives 14 May as the registration date and states that the organizing campaign involved 197 donors.

=== Activities since 2020 ===
In January 2020, Byun Hui-su announced at a news conference held at CMHRK that she would challenge the Army's decision to discharge her following gender-affirming surgery. Lim said that CMHRK would support her challenge. Byun died in 2021 while the case was pending. In October 2021, the Daejeon District Court ruled that the discharge should be annulled. Between 2020 and 2022, CMHRK also operated a support programme that included trauma counselling and legal and medical assistance for victims of military abuse and bereaved families.

After the 2021 death of Air Force Master Sergeant Lee Ye-ram, CMHRK raised allegations of interference in the investigation of the sexual assault she had reported. In November 2021, the organization released an audio file supplied by a former military lawyer as evidence for its allegations. A special-counsel investigation later found that the file had been fabricated using text-to-speech software. The informant's two-year prison sentence for evidence fabrication and related offences became final in 2023. Reports said that CMHRK had used the file without knowing that it was fabricated.

Following the July 2023 death of Marine Corporal Chae Su-geun during a flood-search operation, CMHRK published messages and testimony from the unit and alleged that commanders had ordered searches without adequate safety measures. The organization counselled a surviving Marine and supported complaints filed by the survivor and his mother. In April 2024, CMHRK alleged that lobbying may have influenced the handling of the investigation.

In 2024, CMHRK assisted the family of Army trainee Park Tae-in and released a recording of a conversation in which the company commander appeared to minimize the punitive training imposed before Park's death. The commander and a deputy commander had by then been indicted on charges including causing death through abuse. CMHRK and the mother of Private Hong Jeong-gi also campaigned for an amendment allowing bereaved military families to seek compensation for their own emotional harm. The National Assembly passed an amendment with that effect in December 2024.

After President Yoon Suk Yeol's declaration of martial law on 3 December 2024, CMHRK filed a complaint with the Corruption Investigation Office for High-ranking Officials against Yoon and 26 other people. It alleged insurrection and abuse of authority. CMHRK later publicized reports that some deployed soldiers had been confined to their bases and had their phones collected. The military denied that allegation. A Seoul court also stayed a police ban on a CMHRK rally near the presidential residence.

In February 2025, CMHRK hosted a news conference at which the Korean Solidarity of Civilian Military Employees (KSCME), a nationwide advocacy group for civilian employees of the South Korean military, announced its formation. In April 2026, CMHRK held a news conference alleging that military prosecutors had brought retaliatory charges against a civilian military employee who represented KSCME. Separately, CMHRK and other advocates applied in 2024 to establish the Byun Hui-su Foundation. The National Human Rights Commission approved the foundation in March 2026 after a court ruled that the prolonged failure to decide the application was unlawful.

== Organization and services ==
CMHRK operates Armycall, which accepts reports and provides counselling about alleged abuse, medical-care problems, disciplinary action and other issues connected with military service. Its work also includes legal and administrative referrals, support for bereaved families, policy advocacy, education and submissions to international human-rights mechanisms.

The affiliated Military Sexual Abuse Victim Support Center provides counselling and referrals for military personnel and civilians affected by sexual violence connected with service members. Its reported statistics are maintained separately from CMHRK's general-intake figures from 2022 onward.

The United States Department of State's human-rights reports for 2021 and 2022 cited reports by CMHRK when describing instances of violence and cruel treatment in the South Korean military. Amnesty International's 2017–18 report on South Korea cited CMHRK's account of the Army investigation of gay soldiers.

CMHRK reports the number of regular donors in its annual publications. It recorded 866 at the end of 2018, 1,254 at the end of 2019, 1,242 at the end of 2020, 1,336 at the end of 2021 and 1,327 at the end of 2022. These are historical donor counts, not a current membership figure.

=== Finances ===
CMHRK has received public project funding in some earlier years. For example, its reports mention a Seoul municipal grant for a 2013 education programme, and news coverage described National Human Rights Commission funding for Armycall preparation in 2014. The organization's 2024 report, by contrast, recorded no government subsidy income for that year. It stated that general and designated donations accounted for 99.9 per cent of revenue.

2024 finances as reported by CMHRK
| Category | Amount (won) | Share |
Revenue
| General donations | 561,947,068 | 96.1% |
| Designated donations | 22,305,336 | 3.8% |
| Non-operating income | 454,267 | 0.1% |
| Total revenue | 584,706,671 | 100.0% |
Expenditure
| General programme costs | 302,656,743 | 62.0% |
| Psychological-care support | 8,632,600 | 1.8% |
| Victim support | 27,248,000 | 5.6% |
| Support for a surviving Marine | 1,875,100 | 0.4% |
| Fundraising and communications | 30,405,601 | 6.2% |
| Administration | 92,995,159 | 19.1% |
| Non-operating expenses | 7,287,210 | 1.5% |
| Transfer to the sexual-violence counselling centre | 16,800,000 | 3.4% |
| Total expenditure | 487,900,413 | 100.0% |

== Counselling statistics ==
CMHRK publishes annual intake figures, but the figures do not form a consistent time series. The covered channels and organizational scope changed. The 2011 figure includes only the online message board and excludes telephone, email and in-person contacts. The 2012 total uses a broader category of counselling requests. The 2015 report counts incidents rather than individual counselling sessions. From 2022, CMHRK separated general intake from the affiliated sexual-violence centre. The tables therefore reproduce the organization's reported figures without treating changes between years as changes in the incidence of military rights violations.

CMHRK general counselling incidents by year
| Year | 2011 | 2012 | 2015 | 2016 | 2017 | 2018 | 2019 | 2020 | 2021 | 2022 | 2023 | 2024 |
|---|---|---|---|---|---|---|---|---|---|---|---|---|
| Reported incidents | 41 | 122 | 567 | 432 | 1,036 | 1,238 | 1,669 | 1,710 | 1,708 | 1,348 | 1,260 | 1,348 |

The affiliated centre counts one counselling contact as one session. Its figures are therefore not counts of distinct incidents and are not comparable with the general table. The 2019 figure covers the period after the centre opened; the report recorded 117 sessions but did not state the number of clients.

Military Sexual Abuse Victim Support Center counselling sessions by year (clients in parentheses)
| Year | 2019 | 2020 | 2021 | 2022 | 2023 | 2024 |
|---|---|---|---|---|---|---|
| Sessions (clients) | 117 (not reported) | 386 (127) | 866 (200) | 929 (154) | 961 (181) | 983 (186) |

== See also ==
- Human rights in South Korea
- National Human Rights Commission of Korea
