= Han Chang-min =

South Korean politician (born 1973)

Leader of the Social Democratic Party
- In office February 15, 2024 – 22 September 2026
- Preceded by: Office established
- Succeeded by: Song Chi-yong

Floor Leader of the Social Democratic Party
- Incumbent
- Assumed office May 30, 2024
- Preceded by: Office established

Member of the National Assembly
- Incumbent
- Assumed office May 30, 2024
- Constituency: Proportional representation

Personal details
- Born: July 22, 1973 (age 53)
- Party: Social Democratic Party
- Other political affiliations: Independent (2001-2002, 2008-2012); People's Party for Reform (2002-2003); Uri Party (2003-2007); Grand Unified Democratic New Party (2007-2008); Justice Party (2013-2024); New Progressive Alliance (2024); Democratic Alliance of Korea (2024)

Korean name
- Hangul: 한창민
- RR: Han Changmin
- MR: Han Ch'angmin

Han Chang-min (Korean: 한창민, 22 July 1973) is a South Korean politician serving as a member of the 22nd National Assembly. He is the inaugural floor leader and former party leader of the Social Democratic Party.

== History ==
He became active as a member of the Roh Moo-hyun Supporters' Association National Primary Election Campaign Committee starting in 2002. In 2005 he became the Director of the "Solidarity for Participatory Politics." He later became operations team leader for the Bongha Project Headquarters at the Roh Moo-hyun Foundation. In 2021, he served as the Head of the Management Planning at the Roh Moo-hyun Foundation.

He was appointed chairman of the preparatory committee for the Daejeon City Chapter of the Progressive Justice Party, and later the inaugural chairman of the Justice Party's Daejeon City Chapter. He served as a spokesperson for the Justice Party and as its deputy chairman from 2017 to 2019. He was a member of the "New Progress" faction of the party, some of whom had originally belonged to the People's Participation Party.

In the 22nd National Assembly election held in 2024, he ran as a representative of the Democratic Alliance of Korea and was assigned the 10th spot on the proportional representation list. Following the election results, he secured a seat as a member of the 22nd National Assembly. After the election, he was expelled from the Democratic Alliance of Korea and returned to his original party, the Social Democratic Party.

== Election history ==
Year	Election	Number	Office	Constituency	Party	Votes	Vote share	Position	Result	Comparison
2014	Local elections	6th	Mayor	Mayor of Daejeon	Justice Party	11,346	1.76%	3rd	Lost	6th local elections
2020	Legislative election	21st	National Assembly	Proportional representation	Justice Party	2,697,956	9.67%	10th (proportional representation)	Not elected	Left the party before succession
2024	Legislative election	22nd	National Assembly	Proportional representation	Democratic Alliance	7,567,459	26.69%	10th (proportional representation)	Elected	First election

== See also ==
- Social Democratic Party (South Korea)
- List of members of the National Assembly (South Korea), 2024–2028
- Democratic Alliance of Korea
