= State Public Officials' Labor Union =

South Korean civil service trade union

- Abbreviation: SLU
- Formation: 4 October 2016; 9 years ago
- Merger of: Executive Branch Public Officials' Labor Union and Central Administrative Agencies Public Officials' Union
- Type: Trade union
- Purpose: Representation of national public officials and protection of their labor rights and working conditions
- Headquarters: 5F, 252, Hangang-daero, Yongsan-gu, Seoul, South Korea
- Coordinates: 37.5409404715971°N 126.973536596832°E
- Region served: South Korea
- Members: 36,269 (2024)
- Official language: Korean
- Chair: Lee Cheol-su
- Affiliations: Confederation of Korean Government Employees' Unions
- Website: splunion.org

Korean name
- Hangul: 국가공무원노동조합
- Hanja: 國家公務員勞動組合
- RR: Gukga gongmuwon nodongjohap
- MR: Kukka kongmuwŏn nodongjohap

Short name
- Hangul: 국공노
- Hanja: 國公勞
- RR: Gukgongno
- MR: Kukkongno

The State Public Officials' Labor Union (SLU; Korean: 국가공무원노동조합), abbreviated in Korean as Gukgongno (국공노), is a South Korean trade union representing public officials employed by central government ministries, agencies and commissions. Its rules give its English name as State Public Officials' Labor Union and its abbreviation as SLU.

The union traces its organizational history to an unregistered public officials' union formed in 2004. It adopted its current name and integrated structure in 2016, when two unions representing employees of central government bodies combined. The union is affiliated with the Confederation of Korean Government Employees' Unions. South Korea's Ministry of Employment and Labor reported 36,269 members at the end of 2024. The union said in 2026 that its branches covered 35 central administrative bodies and one constitutional institution.

== History ==
The union's official chronology traces its origin to 7 May 2004, when the first Executive Branch Public Officials' Labor Union (행정부공무원노동조합) was launched as an organization without legal trade-union status. The organization was renamed the Central Government Ministries Public Officials' Labor Union (중앙부처공무원노동조합) in March 2005. In 2006, representatives from 13 government bodies held a founding delegates' conference for an executive-branch union, which filed an establishment report with the Ministry of Labor that September and joined the Confederation of Korean Government Employees' Unions in December. A former chair described the 2004 organization as the present union's predecessor.

On 4 October 2016, the Executive Branch Public Officials' Labor Union changed its name to the State Public Officials' Labor Union as part of an integration with the Central Administrative Agencies Public Officials' Union (중앙행정기관공무원노동조합). Contemporary and later reports described the resulting organization as a merger of the two unions.

== Collective bargaining ==
In December 2017, the union and the Ministry of Personnel Management concluded a collective agreement for central-government officials, ending negotiations that had begun in 2006. It was the first agreement between the parties in 11 years. The agreement provided for a labor–management consultative council on working conditions and welfare, official leave for union representatives attending regular delegates' meetings, and consideration of improvements to maternity leave. At the time, Yonhap News Agency described the union as representing about 25,000 mid- and lower-level central-government officials.

A second agreement was signed in December 2021 after negotiations that had started in September 2018. It included measures concerning childcare-leave benefits, support for public officials responding to national disasters, workplace safety for officials handling civil complaints, flexible work and substitute holidays for weekend duty.

In October 2023, the union requested a third round of executive-branch bargaining. Its proposals included establishing a mutual-aid association for national public officials, housing support for officials assigned far from their home region, changes to the public-official pay-setting process and expanded childcare support. The resulting agreement was signed in August 2025 by the government and a delegation of seven national public-official unions led by the SLU chair. The parties agreed to pursue a mutual-aid association, expand support for early-career officials assigned to distant workplaces, grant official leave to union auditors, and work on reforms concerning on-call duty, staff who handle civil complaints and workplace health and safety.

== Other activities ==
During the 25th World Scout Jamboree in August 2023, the union criticized what it described as last-minute and unclear instructions mobilizing ministry employees to support participants after the campsite was evacuated.

In November 2025, the union welcomed a Ministry of Personnel Management plan to revise the national on-call system. The proposed changes included wider use of work-from-home on-call shifts, integrated on-call rooms for groups of agencies, and reduced patrol and staffing requirements.

== Organization ==
The union's branches are organized around central administrative bodies and comparable independent or constitutional institutions. Its rules permit eligible serving and former national public officials to join, subject to South Korea's law governing public officials' trade unions. Lee Cheol-su began a second consecutive term as chair, the union's 12th leadership term, on 1 January 2026. The union lists offices at the Government Complex Sejong and in Yongsan District, Seoul.

== See also ==
- Korean Government Employees' Union
- Labor movement of South Korea
- Trade unions in South Korea
