= Lim Tae-hoon =

- Born: October 9, 1975 (age 50); Yeongju, Gyeongsangbuk-do, South Korea
- Education: Sungkonghoe University
- Occupations: Human rights defender, Center for Military Human Rights Korea (Representative)

Korean name
- Hangul: 임태훈
- Hanja: 林泰勳
- RR: Im Taehun
- MR: Im T'aehun

Lim Tae-hoon (Korean: 임태훈; born 9 October 1975 in Yeongju, South Korea) is a human rights defender and was a lecturer of Kangwon University. He has been committed to women, youth, sexual minority issues along with rights of conscientious objection, soldiers, riot police and so on. He was the first head of Solidarity for LGBT Human Rights of Korea from 1998 to 2002.

== Career ==
From 2004 to 2005, he was imprisoned for his conscientious objection to the military service of the Republic of Korea. His case was viewed as a violation of the human rights enshrined in the International Covenant on the Civil and Political Rights (ICCPR). He specifically objected to the criteria for conscription examination which classifies homosexuality as a type of mental disorder and criminalizes consented homosexual intercourse of two male soldiers under Article 92 of Military Criminal Act (as of 2020, it is Art. 92–6). The Amnesty International endowed the status of conscientious objector to him for this activity.

After this experience, he continued human rights activities related to the military issues. Then around 2008, he organized an establishment for the military human rights center. In 2009, finally, he established the Center for Military Human Rights Korea (CMHRK); he is the current Representative of the CMHRK.

=== Academic activities ===
2002	Chief Researcher for "HOTLINE Project" funded by the USA ASTRAEA
2007	Researcher for Korea Region for the "2008 Report of the Performance & Establishment of NHRI in Asia" by the Forum-Asia
2013	Master's degrees (NGO Studies) by the Songkonghoe University

=== Representative of the Center for Military Human Rights Korea (CMHRK) ===
The CMHRK (which is also known as the Military Human Rights Center, MHRC) focuses on counseling victims of human rights infringement cases within the military including sexual violence, bullying and beating.

He has participated in the governance body set up by the Ministry of National Defense, after the death of Yoon Seungjoo in 2014. The attackers were found guilty though the responsible officers were not charged. Later he was recommended by the National Assembly to be appointed as a Member of the Military Service Policy Deliberation Committee under the Defense Minister in 2018 to 2019, during which he enforced the lifting the ban on enlisted soldier's mobile phone use.

He had also taken a seat at the Advisory Committee for the Alternative Service in 2018. Later in 2020, he was appointed as one of the first Members of the Alternative Service Committee under the Manpower Administration.

==== Major cases and achievements ====
- Exemption of student loans' interest rate for the conscripted soldiers during the military service in 2011 (actualized in 2013)
- Vaccination of cerebromeningitis/ encephalomeningitis for all trainees in 2011 (actualized in 2012)
- Abolition of arbitrary detention in the military (called, 'detention in a military guardhouse') in 2013 (actualized in 2020)
- Abolition of peacetime court-martial in 2009 (partially actualized in 2015)
- Enactment of military human rights bill in 2009 (partially actualized in 2016)
- Abolition of sodomy law in the military (article 92-6 of the Military Criminal Act) in 2017 (first historic acquittal in 2019)
- Allowance of service of transgender soldiers with completion of the sex reassignment surgery in 2020 (ongoing)
- Guarantee of mobile phone use of the enlisted personnel in 2009 (actualized in 2019)
- Abolition of Defense Security Command in 2017 (partially actualized in 2018)

==== Abroad training ====
2015	IVLP(International Visitors Leadership Program)
2016	PIPA(Programme d'invitation des personnalités d'avenir)

== Awards ==
Date	Award	Conferrer
25 December 2014	Human Rights Award	NCCK (National Council of Churches in Korea)
31 December 2018	Award	Minister of Justice
7 August 2019	Letter of Appreciation	Commander of the Marine Corps
18 December 2019	Letter of Appreciation	Minister of National Defense
