= Yong Hye-in =

South Korean politician (born 1990)

- 용혜인

Leader of the Basic Income Party
- Incumbent
- Assumed office 1 September 2022 (Note: Oh Jun-ho served as acting party leader from 9 May 2024 to 30 June 2024.)
- Preceded by: Shin Ji-hye; Kim Young-gil (acting)
- In office 19 January 2020 – 23 March 2020
- Preceded by: Office established
- Succeeded by: Park Ki-hong (acting); Shin Ji-hye

Floor Leader of the Basic Income Party
- Incumbent
- Assumed office 30 May 2020
- Preceded by: Office established

Member of the National Assembly
- Incumbent
- Assumed office 30 May 2020
- Constituency: Proportional

Personal details
- Born: 12 April 1990 (age 36) Bucheon, South Korea
- Party: Basic Income Party
- Other political affiliations: Platform (2020); Labor (2013–2019); New Progressive (2010–2013)
- Education: Kyung Hee University
- Website: yonghyein.kr

Korean name
- Hangul: 용혜인
- Hanja: 龍慧仁
- RR: Yong Hyein
- MR: Yong Hyein

Yong Hye-in (Korean: 용혜인, born 12 April 1990) is a South Korean civil society activist who has served as the leader of the Basic Income Party since 2022. She was one of the main proponents of the silent march campaign, Stay Where You Are, that originated in an announcement made during the sinking of MV Sewol in 2014.

In the National Assembly, she serves on the Public Administration and Security Committee, Strategy and Finance Committee, and Gender Equality and Family Committee. She is also a senior fellow and member of the National Assembly Forum on Basic Income study.

== Political career ==
In 2014, the prosecution requested a prison sentence for leading the Stay Where You Are protest, which was denied. The president at the time of the tragedy was subsequently impeached, and six years later Yong Hye-in was elected to the National Assembly.

In 2020, she founded the Basic Income Party, where 80% of the members were in their 20s, and she was its first leader. In 2021, she was re-elected, becoming the third standing representative of the Basic Income Party.

On 23 May 2021, Yong became the third MP in South Korean history to give birth while serving as a sitting member of parliament. Since the birth of her child, Yong had been on maternity leave from Parliament, temporarily substituted while she was absent by Basic Income Party leader Shin Ji-hye.

Yong returned to Parliament on 5 June 2021 with her 59-day-old son.

On 5 May 2023, the Children's Day of South Korea, she delivered a speech with her two-year-old son, advocating for the elimination of no kid zones. In May she also became the first in South Korea who proposed the Civil union Act.

After the Seoul Halloween crowd crush, she worked as a special committee member for the investigation into the incident, and her findings served as a major basis for the impeachment of the responsible minister.

She presents universal basic income as an alternative to inequality and the climate crisis in the post-pandemic era. She has proposed several legislative bills about basic income, such as the Basic Income on Carbon Tax Act and the Basic Income on Land Tax Act, and has asked the government to actively engage in energy and digital transition. She also operates the study of the National Assembly Forum on basic income.

She was a keynote speaker at the Basic Income Earth Network Congress, in Seoul, in 2023.

In June 2023, she insisted that wastewater dumping from the Fukushima nuclear accident be stopped and proposed a referendum.

Yong has been described as someone who is a "vocal supporter of the rights of women, children, working-class people, and other politically underrepresented groups".

In September 13, 2026, Yong stepped down as a candidate for the minister of Gender Equality and Family after a request from the Democratic Party.

== Electoral results ==
Year	Elections	Constituency	Political party	Votes (%)	Remarks
2016	20th National Assembly General Election	PR (1st)	Labor Party	91,705 (0.38%)	Not Elected
2020	21st National Assembly General Election	PR (5th)	Platform Party (Note: Originally a member of the Basic Income Party but ran under the Platform Party banner. She was expelled from the party on 12 May 2020 in order to return to her original party.)	9,307,112 (33.35%)	Elected
2024	22nd National Assembly General Election	PR (6th)	Democratic Alliance (Note: Originally a member of the Basic Income Party but ran under the Democratic Alliance banner. She was expelled from the party in order to return to her original party.)	7,567,459 (26.69%)	Elected

== See also ==
- Basic Income Party
