= Kim Joon-hyung (professor) =

South Korean professor

- 김준형
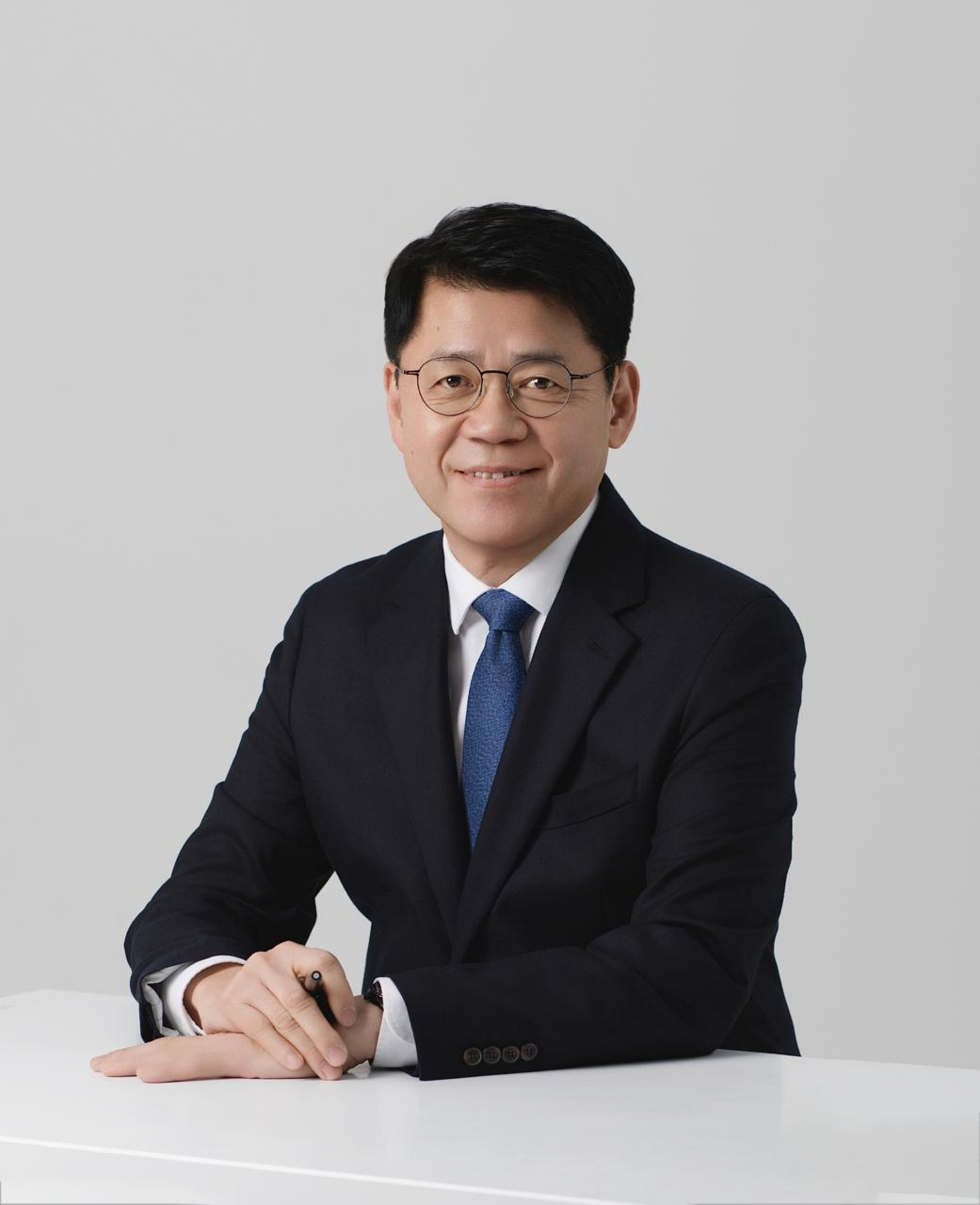

Floor leader of the Rebuilding Korea Party
- Incumbent
- Assumed office 16 June 2026
- Preceded by: Seo Wang-jin

Member of the National Assembly
- Incumbent
- Assumed office 30 May 2024
- Constituency: Proportional representation

Chancellor of Korea National Diplomatic Academy
- In office 9 August 2019 – August 2021
- President: Moon Jae-in
- Minister: Kang Kyung-wha
- Preceded by: Cho Sei-young
- Succeeded by: Hong Hyunik

Personal details
- Born: 29 March 1963 (age 63) Hongcheon County, Gangwon Province, South Korea
- Party: Rebuilding Korea Party (2024–)
- Education: Yonsei University; George Washington University

Kim Joon-hyung (Korean: 김준형; Hanja: 金峻亨; born 29 March 1963) is a South Korean professor of international relations at Handong Global University served as the Chancellor of Korea National Diplomatic Academy of Ministry of Foreign Affairs under President Moon Jae-in from 2019 to 2021.

Kim joined both Moon's presidential campaigns in 2012 and 2017 as his advisor on foreign and North Korean policies.

Since the beginning of Moon's presidency, Kim has been involved in his policy formulation as an advisor on multiple occasions. As a member of Foreign Affairs and Security Sub-committee of State Affairs Planning Advisory Committee, a Moon's de facto transition team, he is reportedly known to be the co-author of Moon's "New Southern Policy" which seeks to and resulted in expansion of South Korea's relations with ASEAN nations and India in all aspects. Before resigning for Chancellor, he has also served as a member of the National Security Council Advisory Committee, a chair of Advisory Committee for Reforming Ministry of Foreign Affairs and a member of Peace and Prosperity Committee of Presidential Commission on Policy Planning roughly from the beginning of Moon's presidency.

He participated in "1.5 track meeting" in Helsinki between South Korean, North Korean and American officials in March 2018.

Moreover, he was previously a member of foreign policy and security sub-committee of policy evaluation committee under President Roh Moo-hyun.

Furthermore, he hosted several TV shows in early 2000s, and has frequently shared his views on updates on Inter-Korean and North Korea–United States relations on media.

After completing his doctorate studies in the United States, he worked as a researcher at the United States Institute of Peace. He then came back to Korea and taught international relations at multiple universities as part-time lecturer. Since 1999 when he joined the faculty as an assistant professor, he has been teaching international relations at School of International Studies, Languages and Literature of Handong Global University

Kim holds three degrees in politics: bachelor from Yonsei University in 1986 and master and doctorate in political science from George Washington University in 1990 and 1996.

In the 2024 South Korean legislative election, he was elected as a member of the National Assembly as a proportional representation member for the Rebuilding Korea Party.

On December 11, 2024, regarding South Korean President Yoon’s imposition of martial law, Kim claimed during a meeting of the National Assembly’s Foreign Affairs and Unification Committee that on Friday the 6th, ambassadors of the Five Eyes countries in South Korea met and decided to boycott all international summits, including APEC, if the president continued his duties. However, the U.S., Australian, British, and Canadian embassies later issued official statements asserting that Kim’s remarks were completely unfounded. As a result, Kim effectively became responsible for spreading fake news.

In 2026, he was elected floor leader of the Rebuilding Korea Party succeeding Seo Wang-jin.

== Election results ==
Year	Elections	Constituency	Political party	Votes (%)	Results
2024	22nd National Assembly General Election	Proportional representation (6th)	Rebuilding Korea Party	6,874,278 (24.25%)	Elected
