= Korean Government Employees' Union =

South Korean public-sector trade union

- 전국공무원노동조합
- Abbreviation: KGEU
- Formation: January 1999
- Type: Trade union
- Headquarters: 73, Beodeunaru-ro, Yeongdeungpo-gu, Seoul, South Korea
- Location: South Korea
- Coordinates: 37.52482041860474°N 126.909409656483°E
- Region served: South Korea
- President: Kim Jung-nam
- Affiliations: KCTU
- Website: www.kgeu.org

Korean name
- Hangul: 전국공무원노동조합
- RR: Jeonguk gongmuwon nodongjohap
- MR: Chŏn'guk kongmuwŏn nodongjohap

Short name
- Hangul: 전공노
- RR: Jeongongno
- MR: Chŏn'gongno

The Korean Government Employees' Union (KGEU; Korean: 전국공무원노동조합) is a labor union of government employees in South Korea. The KGEU was founded in 1999 as the Korean Association of Government Employees' Work Councils and part of the Korean Confederation of Trade Unions.
