= Social Democratic Party (South Korea) =

Social Democratic Party 사회민주당
- Abbreviation: SDP
- Leader: Song Chi-yong
- Secretary-General: Kim Bo-kyung
- Floor Leader: Han Chang-min
- Founded: 15 February 2024
- Split from: Justice Party
- Ideology: Social democracy; Social liberalism
- Political position: Centre-left
- National affiliation: New Progressive Alliance (2024)
- Colours: Orange; Green
- National Assembly: 1 / 300

Website
- samindang.kr

Korean name
- Hangul: 사회민주당
- Hanja: 社會民主黨
- RR: Sahoe minjudang
- MR: Sahoe minjudang

Alternative color logo of the Social Democratic Party

The Social Democratic Party (SDP, Korean: 사회민주당) is a South Korean political party that was registered on 15 February 2024. It was founded by members who left the Justice Party.

== History ==
The party participated in the 2024 South Korean legislative election as part of the BIP-led New Progressive Alliance, which in turn participated as part of the DPK-led Democratic Alliance of Korea. Han Chang-min, a representative of the SDP, was elected to the National Assembly by proportional representation.

== Election results ==
=== Local elections ===
Year	Election	Metropolitan mayor		Provincial governor		Metropolitan councilor		Provincial councilor	
		Elected	Share	Elected	Share	Elected	Share	Elected	Share
2026	9th	0/16	0%	0/227	0%	0/933	0%	0/3035	0%
