= Rebuilding Korea Party =

South Korean political party

Rebuilding Korea Party 조국혁신당
- Abbreviation: RKP
- Leader: Shin Jang-sik
- Secretary-General: Chung Choon-saeng
- Floor Leader: Kim Joon-hyung
- Chair of the Policy Planning Committee: Kim Sun-min
- Founder: Cho Kuk
- Founded: 3 March 2024
- Split from: Democratic Party
- Headquarters: 93 Jandari-ro, Mapo-gu, Seoul, South Korea
- Membership (2024): 170,000
- Ideology: Progressivism (South Korean); Liberalism (South Korean)
- Political position: Centre-left
- Colors: True Blue (primary); Cobalt Blue (secondary); Deep Blue (tertiary)
- National Assembly: 12 / 300
- Metropolitan mayors and governors: 0 / 16
- Municipal mayors: 2 / 227
- Provincial and metropolitan councillors: 5 / 933
- Municipal councillors: 32 / 3,034

Party flag

Website
- rebuildingkoreaparty.kr

Korean name
- Hangul: 조국혁신당
- Hanja: 祖國革新黨
- Lit.: Homeland Innovation Party
- RR: Joguk hyeoksindang
- MR: Choguk hyŏksindang

The Rebuilding Korea Party (RKP; Korean: 조국혁신당; lit. 'Homeland Innovation Party') is a South Korean political party founded by former Minister of Justice Cho Kuk ahead of the 2024 South Korean legislative election. The name of the party can be pronounced as 'Jo-guk Hyeok-sin Dang' in Korean. The word 'Jo-guk' refers to 'Fatherland' (Korea), but also refers to the name of the party founder Cho Kuk, which shares the same spelling in Korean. However, the Hanja is different. Cho Kuk resigned as party leader in December 2024 following the Supreme Court decision to uphold his two-year prison sentence for document falsification.

The RKP is considered to be a more left-leaning alternative to the mainstream Democratic Party. The party opposes what it refers to as a "prosecutorial dictatorship" and considered President Yoon Suk-yeol's administration complicit in maintaining it. Thus, the party prioritizes reforming and depoliticizing the country's Public Prosecutor's Office. It also supports greater government intervention in the economy and pushes for an expansion of the social safety net.

== History ==
Former Minister of Justice Cho Kuk announced on 13 February 2024, that he was planning on establishing a new political party with the aim of fighting against "prosecutorial dictatorship". He subsequently registered the Cho Kuk New Party (조국신당) as a preparatory party establishment committee with the National Election Commission. After holding a naming contest for the party, its name was changed to the Rebuilding Korea Party on 29 February 2024. The party selected true blue as its primary color. The party was officially founded on 3 March 2024 at the party's establishment ceremony.

In the 2024 South Korean legislative election, the RKP won 12 seats, all of which were proportional representation seats (RKP did not stand candidates for the district seats to avoid vote-splitting). This made RKP the third-largest party in the 300-seat South Korean parliament, after the Democratic Party, which won 175 seats, and People Power Party, which won 108 seats.

Following the 2024 martial law crisis, the party's legislators voted in favor of the impeachment of Yoon Suk Yeol as well as the later impeachment of Han Duck-soo.

In December 2024, the Supreme Court upheld a ruling which sentenced party founder Cho Kuk to a 2-year prison term for falsifying documents. As a result of the ruling, he lost his seat in the National Assembly and is prohibited from running for office until 2031. Before this, he was seen as a potential candidate in the 2025 presidential election.

The party did not run a candidate in the 2025 South Korean presidential election, endorsing Lee Jae-myung of the Democratic Party.

== Ideology ==
The Rebuilding Korea Party is primarily described as liberal and progressive. It is considered more progressive than the Democratic Party (DP).

The party's platform sets forth abolishing "prosecutorial dictatorship" in South Korea and bringing an end to President Yoon Suk-yeol's administration as a priority. To achieve this, the party prioritizes reforming and depoliticizing South Korea's Public Prosecutor's Office. It also aims to reform the Ministry of Economy and Finance and make the National Assembly Budget Office independent from the Ministry of Economy and Finance. The party displays economic progressive tendencies, and supports greater government intervention in the economy through environmental and scientific investments, balanced development, and expanding the social safety net. The party seeks to achieve a peaceful relationship of cooperation with North Korea and the denuclearization of the Korean peninsula.

== List of leaders ==
No.	Name	Photo	Term of office	
No.	Name	Photo	Took office	Left office
1	Cho Kuk		3 March 2024	4 July 2024
-	Kim Joon-hyung (acting)		4 July 2024	20 July 2024
2	Cho Kuk		20 July 2024	12 December 2024
-	Kim Sunmin (acting)		12 December 2024	7 September 2025
3	Cho Kuk		11 September 2025	4 June 2026 (Note: Acting: 8 September 2025 – 23 November 2025)
-	Shin Jang-sik		4 June 2026	25 July 2026
4	Shin Jang-sik		25 July 2026	Incumbent

== Election results ==
Election	Leader	Constituency				Party list				Seats		Position	Status
Election	Leader	Votes	%	Seats	+/-	Votes	%	Seats	+/-	No.	+/–	Position	Status
2024	Cho Kuk					6,874,278	24.25	New	12 / 46	12 / 300	New	3rd	Opposition
