= Basic Income Party =

Political party in South Korea

Basic Income Party 기본소득당
- Leader: Oh Jun-ho
- Secretary-General: Kwon Eun-hee
- Floor Leader: Yong Hye-in
- Chair of the Policy Planning Committee: Keum Min
- Founded: 19 January 2020
- Split from: Labor Party
- Membership (2023): ▲23,271
- Ideology: Universal basic income; Social liberalism
- Political position: Centre-left
- National affiliation: New Progressive Alliance
- Colors: Mint green Dark green
- National Assembly: 1 / 300

Party flag
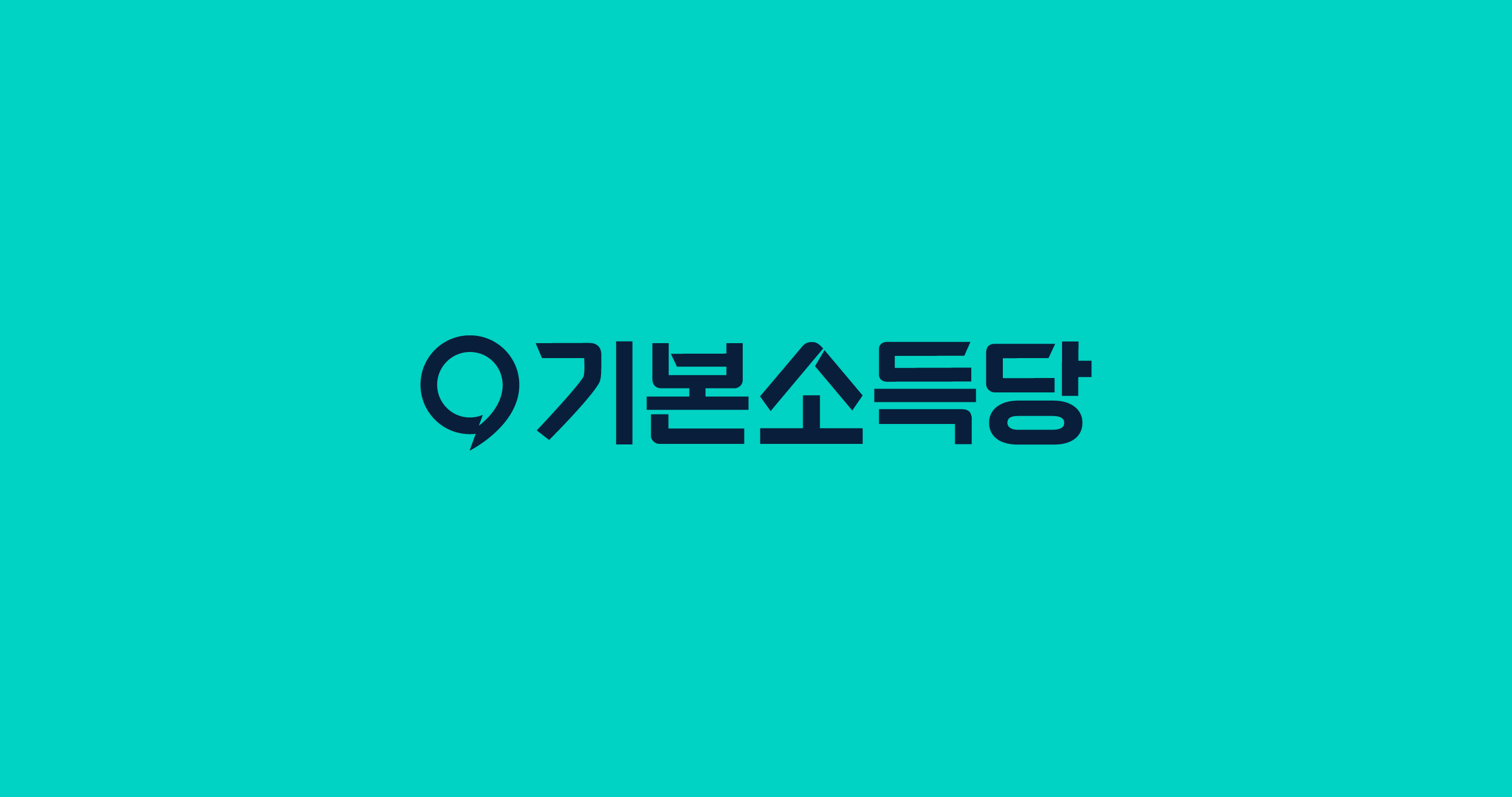

Website
- basicincomeparty.kr

Korean name
- Hangul: 기본소득당
- Hanja: 基本所得黨
- RR: Gibon sodeukdang
- MR: Kibon sodŭktang

Logo of the New Progressive Alliance (2024)

The Basic Income Party (BIP; Korean: 기본소득당) is a single-issue political party in South Korea advocating for a universal basic income (UBI). For the 2024 Parliamentary election, the Basic Income Party formed a coalition with the Open Democratic Party and the Social Democratic Party, called the New Progressive Alliance.

== History ==
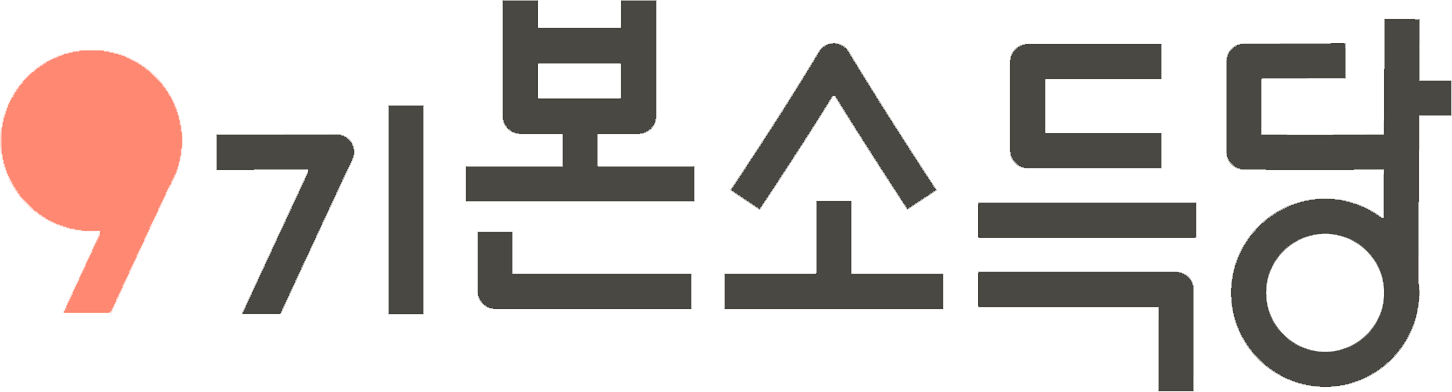
Basic Income Party logo (2020)

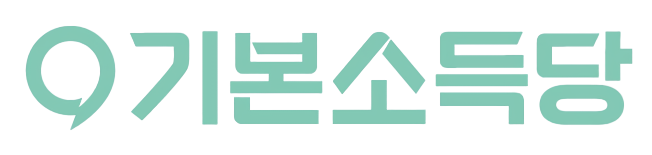
Logo of the Basic Income Party (2020–2024)

The Basic Income Party came into existence when the ninth leadership board of the Labor Party led by Yong Hye-in resigned on 15 July. Before the official founding of the party on 19 January 2020, the Basic Income Party began establishing local chapters of the party across the cities and provinces of South Korea with the catch phrase ₩"600,000 a month for all." The party announced via their Facebook page on 7 November that they reached 5,000 members. The party officially registered with the National Election Commission on 19 January 2020. The party puts a strong emphasis on that their members are mostly young adults.

The party joined the Platform Party (party-list of the Democratic Party) on 21 March 2020 for the 2020 South Korean legislative election. Two candidates ran for proportional representation. Yong Hye-in was elected under the party-list proportional representation. After the election, Yong rejoined the party.

The party declared its support for Jin Kyo-hoon, the candidate of the Democratic Party of Korea, in the Gangseo-gu mayor by-election.

During the 2025 South Korean presidential election, the Basic Income Party opted to not run a candidate and instead endorsed Democratic candidate Lee Jae-myung. Upon the victory of Lee, Democratic MP Kang Yoo-jung was appointed as the spokesperson for the presidential office. This allowed Basic Income Party candidate for proportional representation, Choi Hyuk-jin, to assume Kang's seat and Choi entered the National Assembly as the second Member of Parliament for the Basic Income Party. However, Choi announced on his personal Facebook page that he will not return to the Basic Income Party, breaking the election agreement between the Basic Income Party and the Democratic Party. In response, Yong Hye-in, the leader of the Basic Income Party, declared that she would withdraw her nomination for Choi Hyuk-jin and urged his expulsion from the Democratic Party. Choi was sworn in as a Member of Parliament, and subsequently expelled from the Democratic Party (due to the electoral agreement between the parties), thus began sitting as an independent.

== Ideology ==
As of 2019, the party advocated for the implementation of a ₩600,000 (then roughly equivalent to 500 United States dollars) per month universal basic income for all citizens of South Korea.

In the March 2022 presidential election the party's candidate, Oh Jun-ho, ran on a policy of a universal basic income of 650,000 South Korean won (then $530) a month for all adults in South Korea.

Although the party has no official ideology, it and its former leader, Shin Ji-hye, have been described as socially liberal, advocating feminism and LGBT rights and seeking to improve the social safety net and remedy social disadvantages. It is also described as centre-left.

== Election results ==
=== President ===
Election	Candidate	Votes	%	Result
2022	Oh Jun-ho	18,105	0.05	Not elected

=== Legislature ===
Election	Leader	Constituency				Party list				Seats		Position	Status
Election	Leader	Votes	%	Seats	+/-	Votes	%	Seats	+/-	No.	+/–	Position	Status
2020	Park Gi-hong	4,658	0.0	0 / 253	new					0 / 300	new	36th	Extra-parliamentary

Election	Location	Candidate	Votes	%	Place	Result
2020 Parliamentary	Eunpyeong B, Seoul	Shin Min-ju	2,600	1.89%	4th	Loss
2020 Parliamentary	Goyang D, Gyeonggi Province	Shin Ji-hye	2,058	1.28%	4th	Loss
2021 Seoul Mayor	Seoul, citywide	Shin Ji-hye	23,628	0.48	5th	Loss
2022 Daegu Mayor	Daegu, citywide	Shin Won-ho	7,542	0.87%	4 of 4	Loss
2022 Incheon Mayor	Incheon, citywide	Kim Han-byeol	6,079	0.5	4th	Loss
2022 Gwangju Mayor	Gwangju, citywide	Moon Hyeon-cheol	3,344	0.75	5th	Loss
2022 Gyeonggi Governor	Gyeonggi, Provincial	Seo Tae-seong	9,314	0.16	6th	Loss

== See also ==
- Economic inequality in South Korea
- Economy of South Korea
- Poverty in South Korea
