= Eun Soo-mi =

South Korean politician (born 1963)

- 은수미

Mayor of Seongnam
- In office 1 July 2018 – 30 June 2022
- Preceded by: Lee Jae Myung
- Succeeded by: Shin Sang-jin

Member of the National Assembly
- In office 30 May 2012 – 29 May 2016
- Constituency: Proportional

Personal details
- Born: 6 December 1963 (age 62) Jeongeup, South Korea
- Party: Democratic
- Other political affiliations: Democratic Unionist Party (2012–2013); Democratic Party (2013–2014); New Politics Alliance for Democracy (2014–2015)
- Education: Seoul National University
- Occupation: Activist, politician

Korean name
- Hangul: 은수미
- Hanja: 殷秀美
- RR: Eun Sumi
- MR: Ŭn Sumi

Eun Soo-mi (Korean: 은수미, born 6 December 1963) is a South Korean activist and politician who served as a member of National Assembly from 2012 to 2016. She was elected as the Mayor of Seongnam in 2018, making her the first woman to hold the position.

== Early life ==
Eun was born in Jeongeup, North Jeolla, but grew in Gwanak District of Seoul. Her father was a soldier.

She earned a Bachelor's Degree of Sociology from Seoul National University. Initially, she desired to be a nun, but gave up as her parents didn't allow.

During the early of 1990s, Eun was a member of South Korean Socialist Workers' Alliance, along with Cho Kuk and Rhyu Si-min. This activity caused her to be detained in 1992, under the breach of National Security Act. She later mentioned she was tortured by Agency for National Security Planning and underwent several diseases. It made her to be selected as a prisoner of conscience by Amnesty International.

In 2004, she was hired to Korea Labour Institute and used to write various theses. This experience boosted her career, made her as one of the well-known labour experts.

== Political career ==
=== Member of National Assembly (2012–2016) ===
Originally, Eun was not intended to be a politician. The first time when requested by Democratic Unionist Party (DUP), she faced her family's objections. After a long thought, she finally decided to join politics in order to "achieve her dream". Then, she ran 3rd in the DUP list for the legislative election in 2012, and won the seat.

On 24 February 2016, she gained nationwide attentions after a speech for 10 hours and 18 minutes against the Anti-Terrorist Act, made it as the longest in South Korean history, where the former record was made by Park Han-sang (10 hours and 15 minutes).

In the 2016 election, Eun ran for the Seongnam Jungwon District. She originally intended to run for this constituency during the by-election in last year, but lost to Jung Hwan-seok at preselection. After Jung was defeated by Shin Sang-jin of Saenuri Party (then Liberty Korea Party), Eun could be selected as the candidate in this time. Nevertheless, after Jung was selected as the candidate of People's Party, Eun also lost to Shin. She subsequently accepted the result, but mentioned that she would continue her activities.

=== Mayor of Seongnam (2018-) ===
After lost in 2016, Eun served as Secretary of Women and Family in the Blue House from 2017 to 2018.

During the local elections in 2018, Eun was considered as one of the possible candidates for Seongnam mayorship. She resigned from the Blue House, and in 25 April, she was selected as the candidate of Democratic Party of Korea (DPK). She received 57.6%, and became the first woman mayor of the city. Moreover, she also became the sole woman mayor within Gyeonggi Province.

== Election results ==
=== General elections ===
Year	Elections	Constituency	Political party	Votes (%)	Results
2012	19th National Assembly General Election	Proportional representation (3rd)	DUP	7,777,123 (36.45%)	Elected
2016	20th National Assembly General Election	Seongnam Jungwon (Gyeonggi)	Democratic	44,546 (38.89%)	Defeated (2nd)

=== Local elections ===
==== Mayor of Gyeonggi Seongnam ====
Year	Elections	Constituency	Political party	Votes (%)	Remarks
2018	7th Iocal Election	Mayor of Gyeonggi Seongnam	Democratic	280,510 (57.64%)	Won

== Controversy ==
On 26 April 2018, a person revealed that he was a driver for Eun, and was paid by Komatrade, a company linked to a local gang group, called the International Mafia. This controversy was reviewed by Unanswered Questions of SBS in 21 July. It was reported that her predecessor, Lee Jae-myung, was also implicated into the case. She was sued by the prosecution on 11 December.

On 2 September 2019, Eun was fined 900,000 won for violating the Political Funds Act. Due to being fined less than 1 million won, Eun was able to maintain her mayorship. On 30 November 2021, Mayor Eun was indicted by prosecutors on charges on graft and corruption. Eun is accused of having rewarded a 450 million won streetlight replacement contract to an unidentified company in exchange for insider information during the probe into her Political Funds Act violation. The police officer who leaked the insider information is accused of having received 75 million from the company that won the contract. In addition, Eun is alleged to have helped the officer's acquittance secure a position in the municipal government. Eun was also indicted on allegations of having received gifts of cash and wine worth around 4.67 million won from an aide between October 2018 to December 2019. Eun has denied all the allegations from the prosecution.
