= Lee Jae Myung =

President of South Korea since 2025

Lee Jae Myung GOM OMRI GCLH
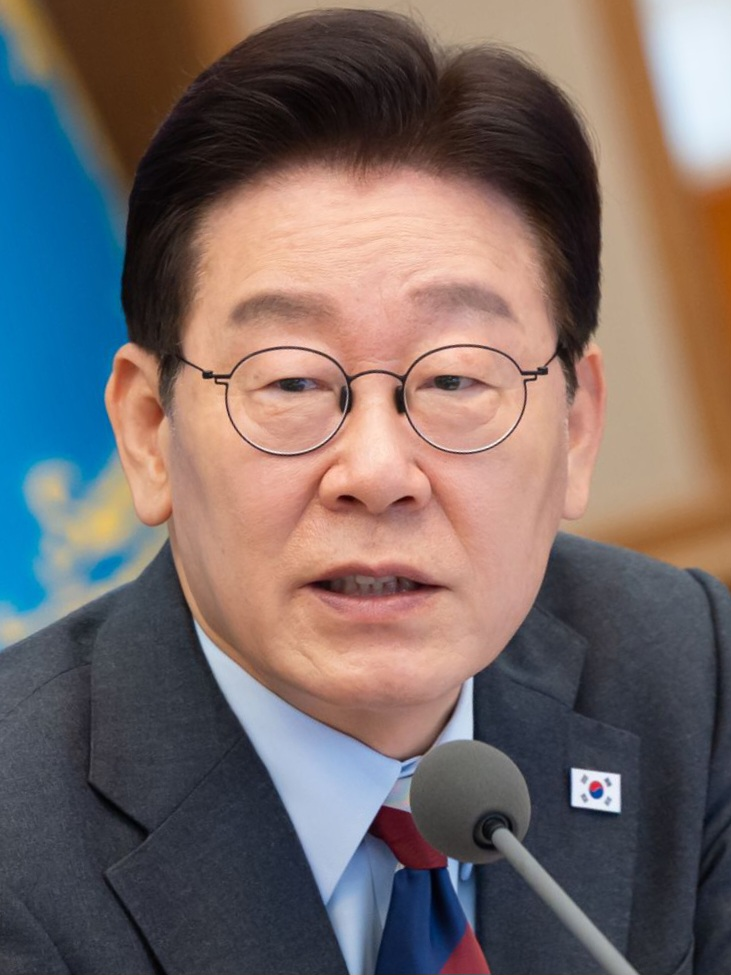
- Lee in 2026

14th President of South Korea
- Incumbent
- Assumed office 4 June 2025
- Prime Minister: Lee Ju-ho (acting); Kim Min-seok; Han Seong-sook
- Preceded by: Yoon Suk Yeol; Han Duck-soo (acting); Lee Ju-ho (acting)

Leader of the Democratic Party
- In office 28 August 2022 – 9 April 2025 (Note: Suspended from 24 June to 18 August 2024 when Lee stepped down to run for re-election as leader. Park Chan-dae served as acting leader during this period.)
- Preceded by: Song Young-gil; Yun Ho-jung, Park Ji-hyun (ERC); Park Hong-keun (interim); Woo Sang-ho (interim); Lee Jae Myung (himself); Park Chan-dae (acting)
- Succeeded by: Park Chan-dae (acting); Lee Jae Myung (himself); Park Chan-dae (acting); Kim Byung-kee (acting); Jung Chung-rae

Member of the National Assembly for Incheon Gyeyang B
- In office 2 June 2022 – 4 June 2025
- Preceded by: Song Young-gil
- Succeeded by: Kim Nam-jun

Governor of Gyeonggi Province
- In office 1 July 2018 – 25 October 2021
- Preceded by: Nam Kyung-pil
- Succeeded by: Oh Byeong-kwon (acting); Kim Dong-yeon

Mayor of Seongnam
- In office 1 July 2010 – 15 March 2018
- Preceded by: Lee Dae-yup
- Succeeded by: Lee Jae-cheol (acting); Eun Soo-mi

Personal details
- Born: c. 8 December 1963 (age 62) (Note: It is believed that Lee was born around this date; Lee's father registered his birth date late. Lee's legal birth date is 22 December 1964, but this was arbitrarily selected by his father.) Andong, North Gyeongsang, South Korea
- Party: Democratic (2015) (since 2015)
- Other political affiliations: Uri (2005–2007); GUDNP (2007–2008); UDP (2008); Democratic (2008) (2008–2011); DUP (2011–2013); Democratic (2013) (2013–2014); NPAD (2014–2015)
- Spouse: Kim Hea Kyung (m. 1991)
- Children: 2
- Education: Chung-Ang University (LLB); Gachon University (MPA)
- Occupation: Politician; lawyer; author

Korean name
- Hangul: 이재명
- Hanja: 李在明
- RR: I Jaemyeong
- MR: I Chaemyŏng
- IPA: [i.dʑɛ.mjʌŋ]
- Lee Jae Myung's voice Lee Jae Myung on fixing South Korea's economy following the 2024 martial law crisis Recorded 13 January 2025

Lee Jae Myung (Note: He uses "Lee Jae Myung" on his passport. His name was previously widely rendered by foreign media as Lee Jae-myung, but upon taking office as president, he requested that organizations use his legal spelling to promote consistency.) (Korean: 이재명; pronounced [i.dʑɛ.mjʌŋ]; born c. 8 December 1963) is a South Korean politician and lawyer who has served as the 14th President of South Korea since 2025. A member of the Democratic Party of Korea (DPK), he was the party's leader while serving as member of the National Assembly for Incheon Gyeyang B from 2022 to 2025. Lee previously served as Governor of Gyeonggi from 2018 to 2021 and as Mayor of Seongnam from 2010 to 2018.

Born into a poor family in Andong, instead of attending middle school, Lee began working at a Seongnam factory at an early age. There, an accident left him disabled. He earned middle and high school equivalency diplomas and graduated from Chung-Ang University with a law degree in 1986. As a human rights and labor lawyer, Lee worked with Minbyun to organize efforts advocating for opening a new hospital in Seongnam.

Lee entered politics in 2005 and ran in several elections without success. He was elected mayor of Seongnam in 2010 and re-elected in 2014. In 2017, he sought the DPK's presidential nomination but lost to Moon Jae-in. Lee resigned as mayor of Seongnam in 2018 to run for governor of Gyeonggi Province, won that race, and served until 2021. In 2022, he won his party's presidential nomination and narrowly lost the general election to Yoon Suk Yeol of the People Power Party (PPP).

Lee survived an assassination attempt in January 2024. In November, he was convicted under the Public Official Election Act for falsely denying a connection to Kim Moon-ki, a former Seongnam Development Corporation executive, during his 2022 presidential campaign. During the 2024 martial law crisis instigated by President Yoon Suk Yeol, Lee drew international attention after climbing over the National Assembly building fence and livestreaming the event. He helped lead the impeachment of Yoon Suk Yeol, which led to the Constitutional Court of Korea removing Yoon from office. In the aftermath of Yoon's removal, Lee launched a third presidential bid in 2025, won the DPK nomination, and defeated the PPP candidate Kim Moon-soo in the presidential election.

== Early life and education ==
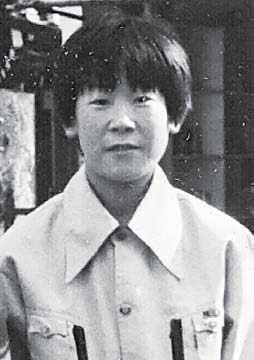
Lee in 1976

Lee was born in Andong, South Korea as the fifth of seven children. His birth likely occurred around 8 December 1963 (the 22nd or 23rd day of the 10th month in the Korean lunisolar calendar), but because his father registered it late, his official birth date was recorded as 22 December 1964.

Lee grew up in poverty and often missed social activities because his family lacked the funds, relying on school faculty's support to join field trips and community events. He cited fishing along the creek with friends as one of his favorite pastimes.

His first-grade report card described him as stubborn, noted that his grades were average, and said he got along well with his classmates. After elementary school – when middle and high school were not publicly funded – his father's gambling losses had exhausted his family's savings, and they left Andong to find work.

Lee's family moved to Seongnam, a planned industrial city created under President Park Chung Hee to move industry out of Seoul. Seongnam was largely populated by poor people who were forced to relocate there by the government.

Like other children from poor families, Lee worked in a handmade necklace factory instead of attending middle school. When the necklace factory went bankrupt, he found work at Dongma Rubber. Because he was underage, he worked under various aliases. While working there, Lee injured his finger.

After the first accident, Lee left Dongma Rubber and worked for Daeyang Industry. There, an industrial press crushed his wrist joint in a second injury. The wound went untreated and resulted in a permanent arm disability. He was later exempted from military service and is officially registered as a disabled person.

While working at Daeyang Industry, Lee saw students in school uniform and decided to pursue higher education. He enrolled in private classes to prepare for equivalency exams. In 1978, he passed the middle school equivalency exam and earned his middle school diploma. In 1981, he passed the high school equivalency exam and obtained his high school diploma.

Lee has stated his own experience with severe poverty inspired his political philosophy of "suppressing the strong, helping the weak" (억강부약; 抑強扶弱; eokgangbuyak), which seeks to curb the privileges and excesses of the powerful and support society's poorest members.

Based on his entrance examination scores, Lee was accepted into Chung-Ang University's College of Law on a scholarship.

== Law career ==
In 1986, upon graduating from college, he passed the bar exam and entered the Judicial Research and Training Institute for two years in order to join the bar. Lee opposed the authoritarian regime of Chun Doo-hwan. Lee originally intended to become a judge or prosecutor for the prestige and pay, but he was inspired by a lecture from Roh Moo-hyun to become a human rights and labour lawyer, like Roh and Moon Jae-in. He set up his practice in Seongnam.

After opening his own lawyer's office, Lee organized for labour and human rights with the lawyers' organization Minbyun, working with the heads of labour counselling centers in Incheon and Gwangju. In 1995, he started a civic movement as a founding member of the 'Seongnam Citizens' Association'. He gained fame as a lawyer and social activist in relation to the "Park View" preferential sale case, where an investigation suggested corruption in the awarding of building permits and preferential sales of property in Bundang to government officials.

In the early 2000s, two general hospitals in Seongnam closed, and Lee started a movement to build a new municipal hospital. Lee and his colleagues collected signatures from 200,000 Seongnam citizens and leading to the submission of an ordinance bill to establish a Seongnam municipal hospital to the city council. However, the city council, where the Grand National Party held a majority, rejected it in a snap vote after just 47 seconds. Lee and the citizens strongly protested, but they were convicted for special obstruction of official duties. Afterwards, he realized that he could not change society through social movements, and he decided to enter politics.

== Early political career ==
On 23 August 2005, Lee joined the then-ruling Uri Party, a predecessor of the Democratic Party of Korea, and declared his candidacy for mayor of Seongnam. He ran as a candidate in the 2006 local elections, but was defeated by 23.75% of the vote due to poor public opinion about the Uri Party and the Roh administration at the time. He graduated from Kyungwon University, later part of Gachon University, with a Master of Public Administration degree in 2005.

In the 2007 presidential election, Lee served as the senior deputy chief of the Office of the Presidential Candidate Chung Dong-young of the Grand Unified Democratic New Party. In the 2008 general election, he applied for a nomination in the constituency of Seongnam Jungwon A, but was defeated by Cho Sung-jun in the primary election, and was nominated in the Seongnam Bundang A constituency. However, Lee suffered from another defeat with 33% of the votes under difficult circumstances, as the constituency was a traditional stronghold of an opposing party who had just won the Presidential election under Lee Myung-bak.

After the 2008 election, Lee served as the Democratic Party's deputy spokesperson at the request of the Democratic Party's leader Chung Sye-kyun.

== Mayor of Seongnam (2010–2018) ==
He ran for the mayoralty of Seongnam in the 2010 South Korean local elections under the Democratic Party, and won with 51.16% of the vote against Hwang Jun-gi.

In his inaugural speech as the 19th mayor of Seongnam, he stated "It will not be easy to take a new step in Seongnam. If it's hard, let's take a break. Let's take care of each other's shoulders and smile, step by step. We can do it. Let's emphasize Seongnam, where citizens are the leaders, citizens are happy, and our Seongnam, where opportunities are equal." He started by moving the mayor's office to a narrower space after allowing the former mayor's office, which caused controversy over its luxury, to become a book cafe.

He also declared a moratorium on spending and debt repayment in his first press conference, due to the city being in large debt (though the debt has never been actively collected on). The first of this was the 520 billion won owed to the Ministry of Land, Infrastructure and Transport over the construction of the Pangyo project; he thereafter attempted to renegotiate the debt owed, and paid it off with a large amount of municipal bonds. He also attracted attention due to his active use of social media, such as Twitter and Facebook, often expressing his views on national issues bluntly on the two services. A particular stunt involving him installing CCTV in the mayoral office gained fame, with him claiming that "many people were bringing in money envelopes."

He also restructured and focused on the welfare policy of the city. In particular focus was funding of the Seongnam Medical Center, which he began to strengthen. He also promoted free school uniforms for students. Along with that, he established a "youth dividend" system, acting as a form of Universal Basic Income for young citizens.

He won re-election in the 2014 South Korean local elections, winning 55.1% of the vote.

Lee is noted for his decision to ban dog meat and to shut down dog slaughtering facilities in Moran Market. The dog slaughtering facilities had long been a subject of heated debate over their morality, the rights of animals, and their environmental impact. In 2016, Lee, an animal rights advocate, signed an agreement with shop owners that prohibited the display and slaughter of live dogs at the market. The city helped business owners transition to other businesses, but did not offer any direct compensation for their closure.

Lee heavily criticized the response of Park Geun-hye to the Sinking of MV Sewol. He also held an 11-day fast in response to plans by Park to reorganize local government's fiscal responsibilities, which would've severely hurt Buddhist groups across the country, including those in Seongnam. By the time he had finished his term as mayor of the city, a survey showcased he had implemented 270 of 287 total promises, including the construction and expansion of the Seongnam Medical Center, a youth dividend policy, and the free student uniform program. In total, he had a 94.1% promise fulfillment rate.

Several of the policies introduced by Lee, such as the youth dividend, would go on to become his premier framework in national politics.

== Governor of Gyeonggi Province (2018–2021) ==
Following his defeat for the presidential nomination, Lee ran for Governor of Gyeonggi Province, which encompasses much of the Seoul Capital Area and has a population of over 13 million, in the 2018 local elections. During the 2018 gubernatorial election, actress Kim Boo-sun reported that she had an affair with Lee in 2007–2009. He won the Democratic Party primary for the governorship over close Moon Jae-in ally Jeon Hae-cheol, capturing about 60% of the vote and being selected to run against incumbent governor Nam Kyung-pil. Despite general expectations of a close race, Lee won against Nam by over 20%, managing to bring in about 56% of the vote. He was the first liberal Governor of Gyeonggi since Lim Chang-yeol twenty years earlier.

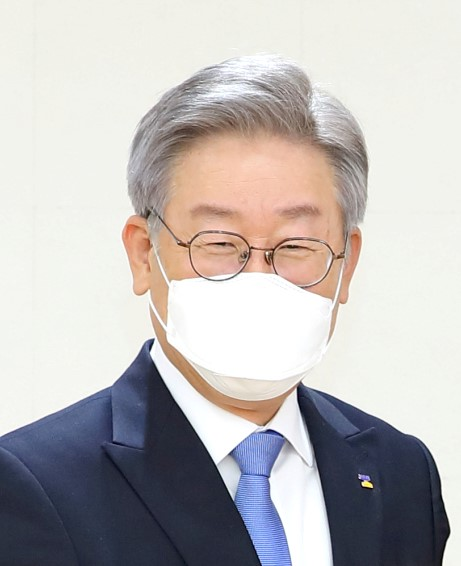
Lee in 2020

Lee received acclaim for his response to the COVID-19 pandemic as governor.

In March 2020, when the nation's first COVID-19 wave took place, following an infection cluster among followers of the Shincheonji Church of Jesus, Lee visited the residence of the organization's founder, Lee Man-hee, in Gyeonggi Province. The founder had refused to be tested for COVID-19 or to share church event attendance records for contact tracing. Lee warned the founder of the potential legal and administrative actions, and secured the founder's cooperation. He responded to critics of his COVID-19 response in the Protestant sects by invoking his own religious views, rhetorically asking, "Am I a fake Protestant?!"

Lee also announced a special order for all foreigners working in Gyeonggi Province to be tested for COVID-19. Seoul announced similar policies but changed them to recommendation after facing criticism. Lee's special order resulted in finding 329 new positive cases.

In February 2021, a year after the first Central Disaster and Safety Countermeasures Headquarters (CDSCH) meeting was held to tackle the COVID-19 pandemic, it was revealed that Lee attended only three meetings, while the average number of meetings attended by provincial and municipal leaders was 68.5. In response, Lee said in April 2021 that he used his time effectively in addressing more critical issues. Chung Sye-kyun publicly shared his frustration that Lee would not have made such a statement if he was well aware of the government's efforts in containing the virus and vaccinating the public.

Throughout 2021, Lee was partially at odds with the central government over his plan to provide COVID-19 disaster relief funds to all residents of Gyeonggi Province.

Lee frequently stated in office, "I have kept an average of 95 percent of my campaign promises while serving the public", and "Even if I might have to experience a political loss, I believe in the collective intelligence of the public, and push forward on the right things in order to bring about results. That is my style". He resigned as governor to focus on his bid for the presidency on 25 October 2021.

== National Assembly (2022–2025) ==
Following his narrow loss in the presidential election the same year, on 7 May 2022, Lee declared his candidacy in the June 2022 South Korean by-elections, running for Incheon Gyeyang District B vacant seat in the National Assembly. Despite weak results for the DPK in the local elections, Lee won the seat in the elections on 1 June 2022. Afterwards, he was elected as the leader of the Democratic Party of Korea on 28 August.

=== Assassination attempt ===
On 2 January 2024, Lee was stabbed in the left side of his neck while holding a question and answer session with reporters after touring the construction site of a planned new airport located on Gadeokdo in Busan. Though Lee remained conscious, he continued bleeding and was transferred to a hospital approximately 20 minutes later. The assailant, who was wearing a "I'm Lee Jae Myung" paper crown, lunged at Lee after asking for his autograph. The assailant was arrested at the scene. The assailant was identified as a man named Kim Jin-sung and was reported to have been born in 1957.

Though the neck wound was not considered to be life-threatening, Lee's surgery took longer than expected, with damage being inflicted on his jugular vein that led to additional bleeding. The laceration in his neck which resulted from the knife wound was determined to be approximately 1 centimetre. While in custody, the assailant confessed to Busan Metropolitan Police that he carried out the attack with the intention of killing Lee.

=== 2024 martial law crisis ===
Lee climbing the National Assembly building fence during the 2024 declaration of martial law in South Korea

Lee gained international attention in 2024 when, after President Yoon Suk Yeol declared martial law and attempted to stop the National Assembly from convening using the military, he continued to go to the Assembly building anyway. Lee started a livestream on his YouTube channel, recording himself in a car driving to the National Assembly and climbing the National Assembly building fence to bypass the military personnel. He called on people to gather in front of the Assembly building, and to "...keep protesting". The Democratic Party alleged that an arrest team had been sent to him, Han Dong-hoon, and Woo Won-shik, attempting to bring all three into custody. This was confirmed from testimony by National Intelligence Service (NIS) Deputy Director Hong Jang-won, who stated Yoon wanted to "use this chance to arrest [opposition leaders] and wipe them out."

He stated that he thought the martial law declaration was, initially, a deepfake. He afterwards led the charge to impeach Yoon, with he himself frequently rallying against the President outside the Assembly building, claiming that Yoon committed treason. On impeachment, he stated that "Yoon will be impeached, if it's today, a month, or three months from now." Yoon was ultimately impeached by the National Assembly on 14 December.

In March 2025, Lee was cleared of a previous accusation of violating election law by a South Korean appeals court, but an appeal filed by the prosecutors to the Supreme Court of Korea overturned his acquittal on 1 May, returning it to the Seoul High Court. The Seoul High Court will be required to deliberate the case again and then refer it to the Supreme Court for a final decision. The initial date of retrial was set at 15 May, but was later delayed to 18 June, which was after the election date. On 9 June, after Lee Jae Myung's election win, the Seoul High Court indefinitely delayed his retrial, on the basis that as a sitting president, he was exempt from prosecution except in the case of insurrection or treason.

== Presidential campaigns ==
=== 2017 presidential election ===
At the end of 2016, Park Geun-hye–Choi Soon-sil Gate broke. At a series of protests that took place across the country, Lee attracted national attention with his strong speeches, stating that "President Park Geun-hye is no longer our president". He ranked second in various public opinion polls after Moon Jae-in in the Democratic Party 2017 primary. An official from the leadership of the DP stated that "I think Lee Jae Myung's support rate can rise by up to 20% because the support of the loyal Democratic Party voters is highly concentrated. There is also an expectation that he may use a similar strategy to Roh Moo-hyun to significantly shore up his support in just a few regions." Lee was considered part of the progressive wing in the Democratic Party.

However, as the protests began to dim with the impeachment of the President and removal of her in favor of Hwang Kyo-ahn, Lee Jae Myung's approval rating, who was popular for his remarks on the scandal, also fell. In the end, Lee Jae Myung's first presidential election ended in him placing third in the primary, with 347,647 votes. He was second to Ahn Hee-jung, who placed second with 353,631 votes, and Moon Jae-in, who won 936,419 votes and a majority. He would go on to defeat Hong Joon-pyo, Ahn Cheol-soo, Yoo Seung-min, and Sim Sang-jung to win the Presidency.

=== 2022 presidential election ===
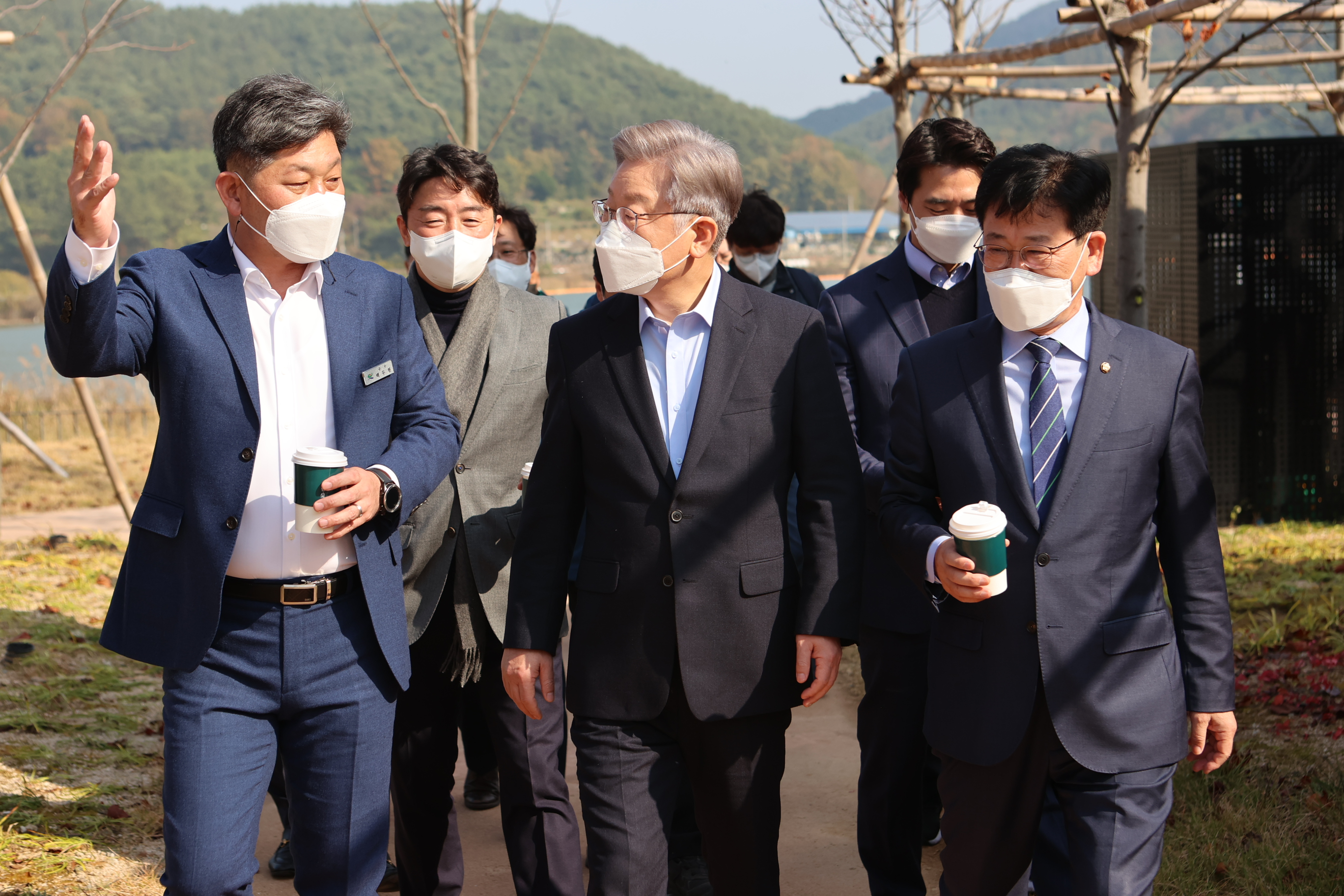
Lee meeting with mayor of Goseong County, Gangwon to discuss proposed projects

Lee declared his bid in the 2022 presidential election in July 2021 and emphasized policies that would ensure equality for people of all backgrounds in the nation, and heighten Korea's standing abroad as a nation that provides public goods for global communities. "We are situated in a time of a great transformation," Lee said in a televised address immediately following his nomination. "My first objective, if I am elected president, would be to help Korea take the lead in fighting climate change, the global pandemic and the ever-speedy technological revolution. My second objective would be to help this nation achieve economic growth during this time of great struggle. When it comes to policies to boost the people's welfare and well-being, there is no left or right; there is no ideological differences. I am ready to try anything and everything if it means the people can lead better livelihoods."

Lee became the nominee of the Democratic Party of Korea on 10 October 2021. Lee won a majority of the votes in the primary and made it directly to the presidential election without a runoff. In his acceptance speech, Lee expressed his ambition to create the new Republic of Korea through reform and practice.

In the general election, Lee lost to Yoon Suk Yeol of the People Power Party, 47.8% to 48.6%.

=== 2025 presidential election ===
On 9 April 2025, five days after the 4 April impeachment of President Yoon Suk Yeol, Lee resigned as leader of the Democratic Party. He announced his third candidacy for the presidential election on 10 April. On 27 April, Lee won the Democratic Party presidential primaries and became the party's official nominee for president.

Among his campaign pledges was amending the Constitution to allow presidents to serve two four-year terms and introduce run-off voting. On 3 June 2025, Lee won the presidential election with 49.42% of the votes.

== Presidency (2025–present) ==
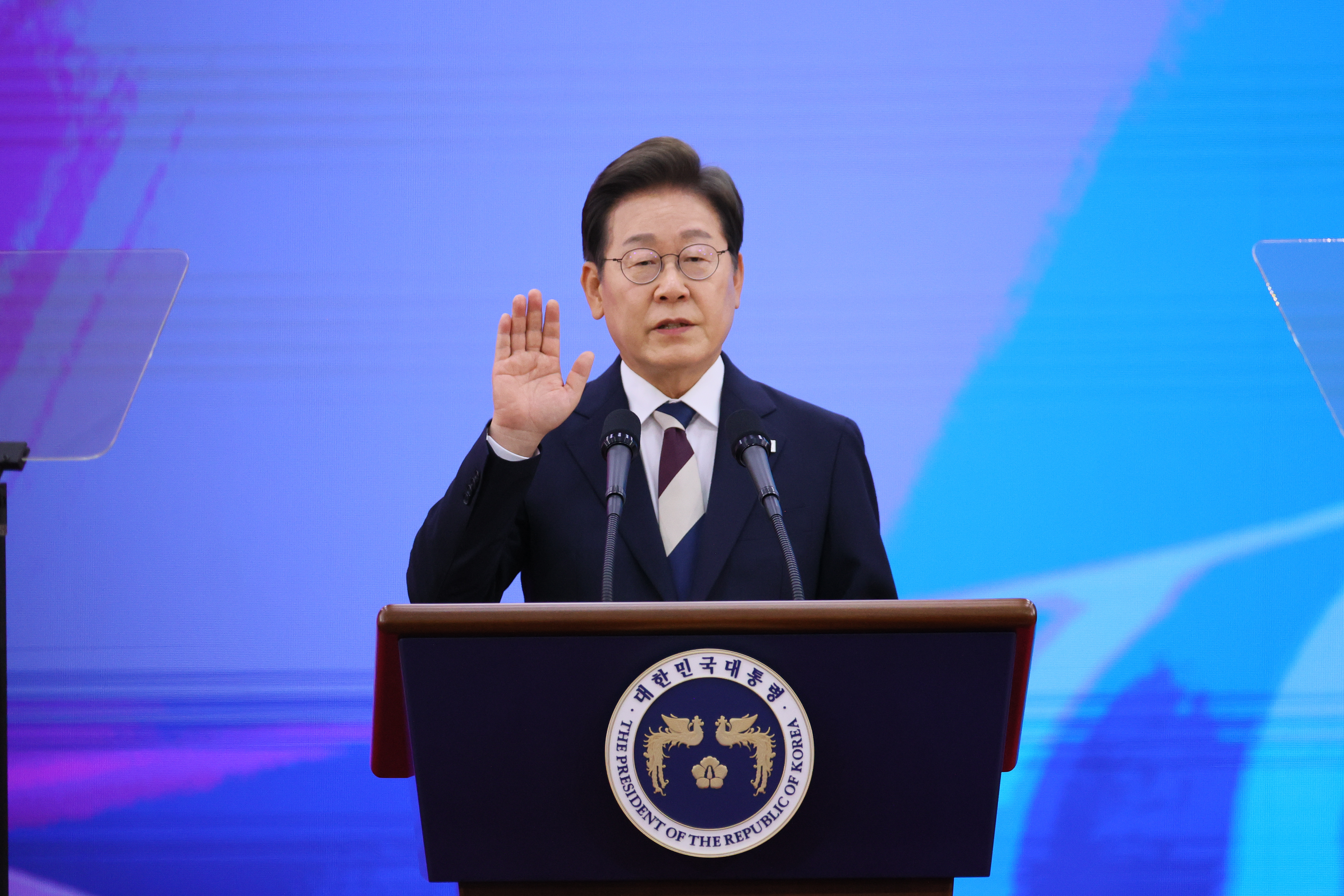
Lee takes the presidential oath of office in the Rotunda Hall of the National Assembly on 4 June 2025.

Lee was sworn in on 4 June 2025 at 11:00 KST. The swearing-in ceremony, which also included Lee giving an inaugural address to the nation, was held in the Rotunda Hall of the National Assembly. Before being sworn in, Lee, in what was regarded to be his "first official schedule," took part in a "world of living together" tribute at the Seoul National Cemetery.

In his first personal announcement as President of South Korea, Lee formally nominated Kim Min-seok as prime minister. Opting to ensure continuity in state affairs, Lee turned down resignation offers from holdover Cabinet members from the previous South Korean government, with the exception of Justice Minister Park Sung-jae. As president, Lee moved the presidential residence from the Yongsan Presidential Office to its previous headquarters at Cheong Wa Dae in December 2025.

On 5 June, Lee withdrew nominations made by former acting president Han Duck-soo to the Constitutional Court. He also ordered the Ministry of Oceans and Fisheries to transfer its headquarters to Busan, which had been part of his campaign pledges. On 23 June 2025, Lee would nominate 10 ministers to his cabinet, including his defense, foreign affairs and unification ministers. Once appointed, his defense minister nominee Ahn Gyu-back became the first civilian defense minister since 1961.

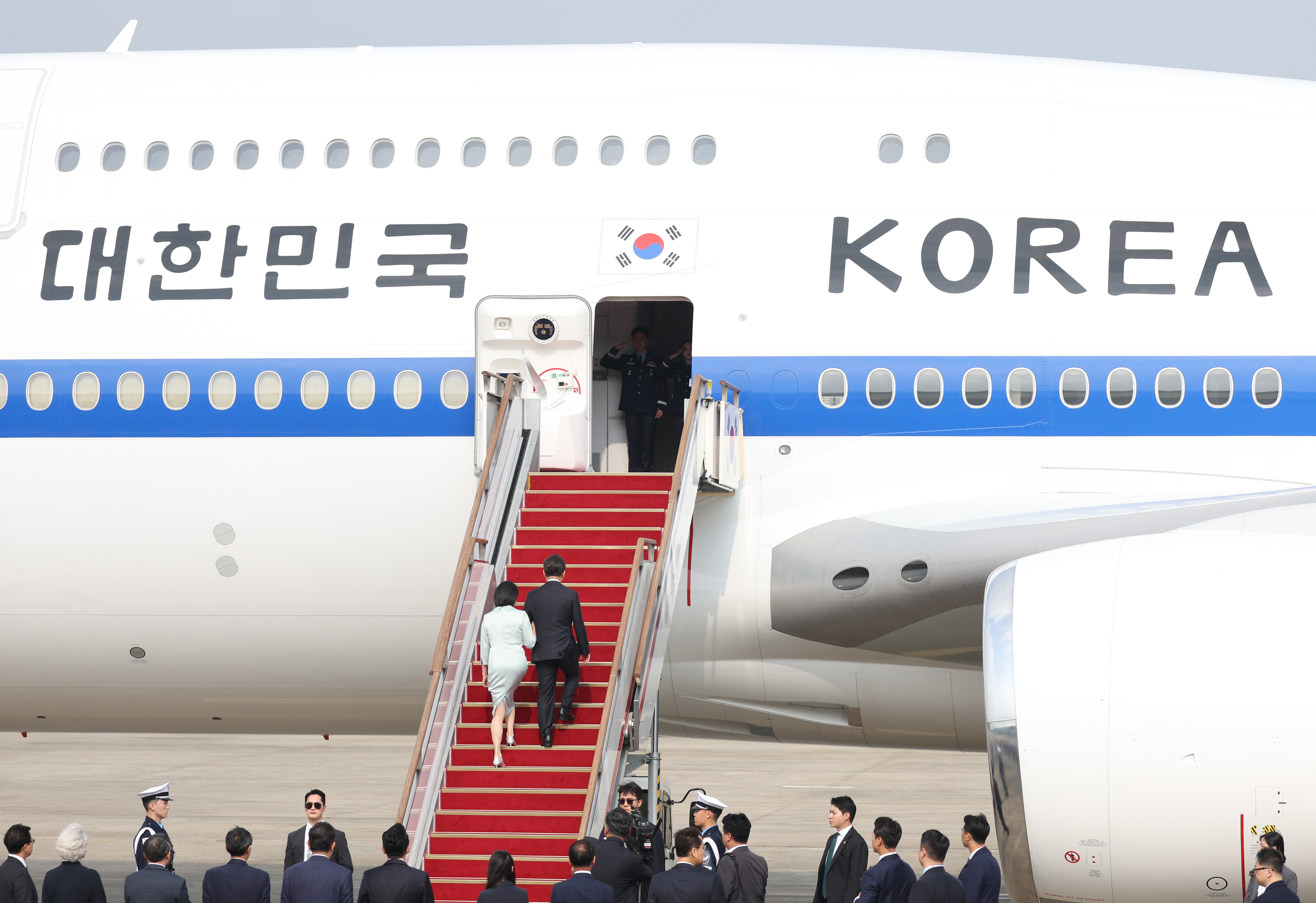
President Lee departs for Canada to attend the 51st G7 summit, his first presidential trip since taking office, 16 June 2025

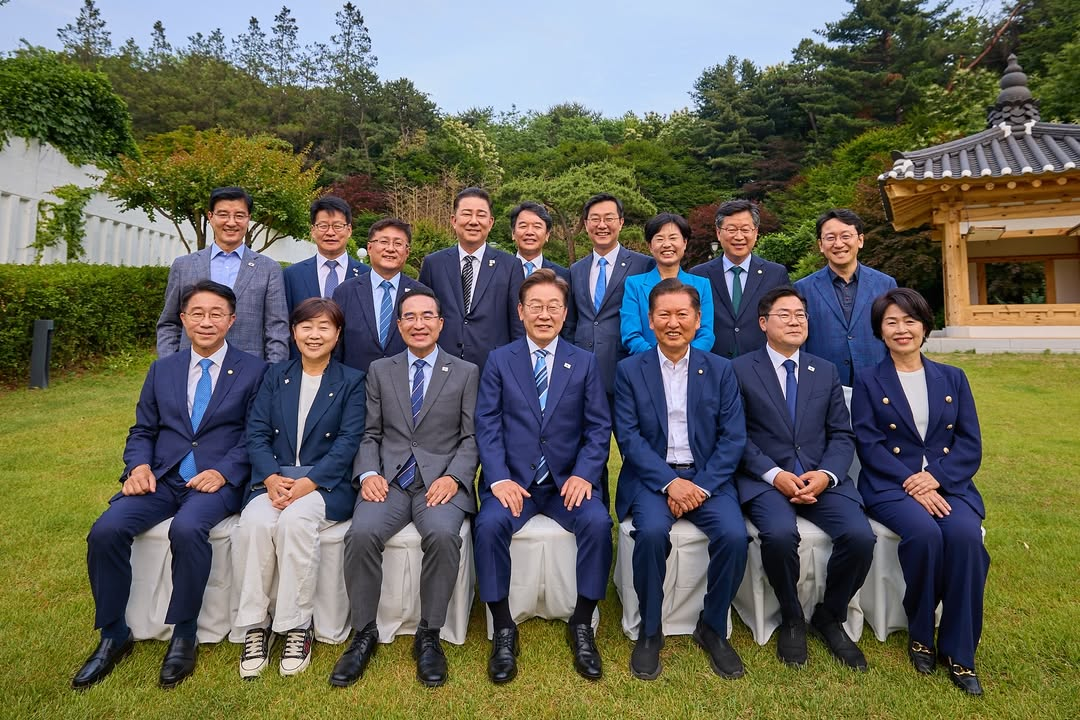
Lee poses for a group photo with members of the National Assembly from the Democratic Party at the presidential residence in Hannam-dong, Seoul, 7 June 2025.

On 3 July 2025, the South Korean National Assembly voted to approve of Kim Min-seok as Prime Minister in a 173–3 vote, who was sworn in as Prime Minister on 7 July 2025. The post of prime minister is the only cabinet-level position which requires National Assembly approval in South Korea. On 13 July 2025, Lee appointed 12 vice ministers. One notable appointment was Hong So-young, who would become the first woman to serve as commissioner of the Military Manpower Administration since the administration was founded in 1970.

On 29 December 2025, Lee Jae-myung commuted to Cheong Wa Dae for the first time since taking office in June, more than three years after his predecessor, Yoon Suk Yeol, moved the presidential office to the Defence Ministry compound in Yongsan. It is the first time a president had commuted to Cheong Wa Dae since 9 May 2022, the last day of President Moon Jae-in's term.

Lee's approval ratings have been among the highest of any modern South Korean president, reaching nearly 70% in some polls as of April 2026. His party made strong gains in the 2026 local elections.

=== Domestic policy ===
On 15 August 2025, a public inauguration ceremony, dubbed the "People's Mandate Ceremony", was held at Gwanghwamun Square in Seoul to commemorate the 80th anniversary of the liberation of the Korean Peninsula from Japan, more than two months after he took office. During the ceremony, he received appointment letters from 80 selected notable people.

On 2 October 2025, Lee issued an apology for the adoption of Korean children overseas in the 1970s and 1980s through processes that involved abuse and fraud. In October 2025, after far-right groups started holding anti-Chinese rallies in response to a launch of visa-free entry for Chinese tour groups, Lee called for a crackdown on such protests.

On 18 December 2025, Lee suggested the merger of Daejeon with South Chungcheong Province ahead of local elections scheduled in 2026.

On 12 January 2026, Lee expressed his support for religious leaders' calls to disband the Unification Church, the Shincheonji Church of Jesus, and other "illegitimate, heretical religious organizations" during a meeting with representatives from major religious communities. In January 2026, the South Korean government launched a major joint investigation into the Unification Church and the Shincheonji Church of Jesus over allegations of bribery, election interference, and corrupt ties to politicians.

Lee has advocated for tightening regulations on low-wage foreign labor, questioning the reliance on minimum-wage migrant workers in key industries. His administration has pushed for raising the minimum salary for foreign workers to protect domestic wage levels, aiming to shift from a growth model based on cheap labor to one prioritizing 'shared growth' and labor rights.

=== Economic policy ===
In June 2025, in order to tackle the Korea discount, the National Assembly twice amended the Commercial Act, which regulates public companies, so that company managers now have fiduciary duty to shareholders rather than just the companies alone. This meant a change of power from the families that dominate companies towards minority investors. The law also mandates electronic shareholder meetings and changes voting procedures. In the same month, Lee's government introduced a cap of 600 million won on all housing-backed loans in the Seoul metropolitan area and other designated regulatory zones. It also introduced mandatory residency requirements as well as reduced maximum loan terms and blocked mortgages for those who own multiple houses in the designates areas.

In July, the Lee cabinet approved a 15.2 trillion won budget allocation to give at least 150,000 won worth of cash-equivalent vouchers to all South Koreans, with those who cannot afford basic living expenses and those categorized as "near poor" given 400,000 won and 300,000 won respectively. It also gives an additional 100,000 won people in the bottom 90 percent of the income bracket. In August, the National Assembly amended the Trade Union and Labor Relations Adjustment Act to allow subcontracting firms' labor unions to make demands of client companies directly, restrict the ability of employers to seek damages for strike-related disruptions and increase the liability for executives who do not participate in collective bargaining.

In August, Lee proposed a 728 trillion won budget for 2026, an increase of 8.1 percent from the previous year. The budgets increases research and development spending by 19.3 percent to 35.3 trillion won, including nearly tripling artificial intelligence funding to 10.1 trillion won, defense spending by 8.3 percent to 66.3 trillion won, and health, welfare and employment spending by 8 percent to 269.1 trillion won. In December, the Democratic Party and the PPP agreed on the budget, which includes the establishment of a 150 trillion won National Growth Fund to support industrial policy, and an increase of the corporate tax rate by 1 percent to 25 percent, as well as well as an increase on the education tax from 0.5 percent to 1 percent.

=== Foreign policy ===
==== China ====
Lee has focused on improving relations with China, which frayed relatively under his predecessor Yoon Suk Yeol, who prioritized closer relations with the United States. In October 2025, he hosted Chinese leader Xi Jinping in South Korea; this was Xi's first visit to South Korea since 2014. This was reciprocated by a visit by Lee to China in January 2026, the first visit by a South Korean president since 2019. During the visit, Lee called for a "full-scale restoration of South Korea-China relations". During the visit, he criticized anti-Chinese sentiment in South Korea and those who spread conspiracy theories regarding China's involvement in election fraud in South Korea, which he said "angered Chinese people and drove them to turn their backs on Korea". He said that anti-Chinese sentiment harmed the country as it contributed to anti-Korean sentiment in China, leading to consumer boycotts of Korean goods and products. In November 2026, Lee visited Shenzhen to attend APEC China 2026. Xi and Lee held a meeting, with both leaders marking the 35th anniversary of diplomatic ties. Xi said he was willing to assist in "various efforts aimed at easing tensions on the Korean Peninsula, including a North Korea-U.S. dialogue", while Lee asked China to play "a constructive role" in the Korean Peninsula issues, which he said was a "do or die" matter.

==== North Korea ====
On 11 June 2025, Lee banned anti-North Korean activists from sending leaflets into the North by balloon. He also ordered the military to halt loudspeaker propaganda broadcasts across the border with North Korea, South Korea even switched off shortwave radio broadcasts that had carried similar propaganda for over half a century in an attempt to improve relations. North Korea responded by halting their own propaganda loudspeakers towards the South just a few hours later. Lee expressed gratitude for the North's reciprocation, remarking that the speed of their response had exceeded his expectations, and also expressed hope for an improvement in relations.

However, these efforts by Lee were "not the work worthy of appreciation," said Kim Yo Jong, who spoke for her brother, Kim Jong Un, in a statement. She went on to say that regardless of what policy was adopted in Seoul or proposal was sent that they had zero interest in discussion with South Korea. These were the first official remarks on the new administration by the North Korean government. South Korea sought to downplay the significance of the statement by Kim Yo Jong, saying that the government would continue its efforts to promote reconciliation and cooperation. A South Korean government spokesman, Koo Byoung-sam, said that the remarks from the North "showed how high the wall of distrust has become in South-North Korean relations." In other to improve relations, Lee also halted five radio channel and one TV channel broadcasts by the National Intelligence Service to North Korea.

On 1 March 2026, Lee gave a statement to mark the National Liberation Day, where he called on for cooperation between the two Koreas, and said that South Korea "respects North Korea's system" and would not pursue "unification by absorption". He also said South Korea would work to replace the Armistice Agreement with a "permanent peace regime". On 25 March 2026, Unification Minister Chung Dong-young referred to the North Korea–South Korea relations as hanjo gwangye (한조관계; Hanguk-Chosŏn relations) instead of the traditional term "North-South relations". He also referred to North Korea by its official name, the Democratic People's Republic of Korea, the first time a senior South Korean government official had used North Korea's official state name, parallelling North Korea's own move towards calling South Korea in its official state name as per the two hostile states theory.

==== Japan ====
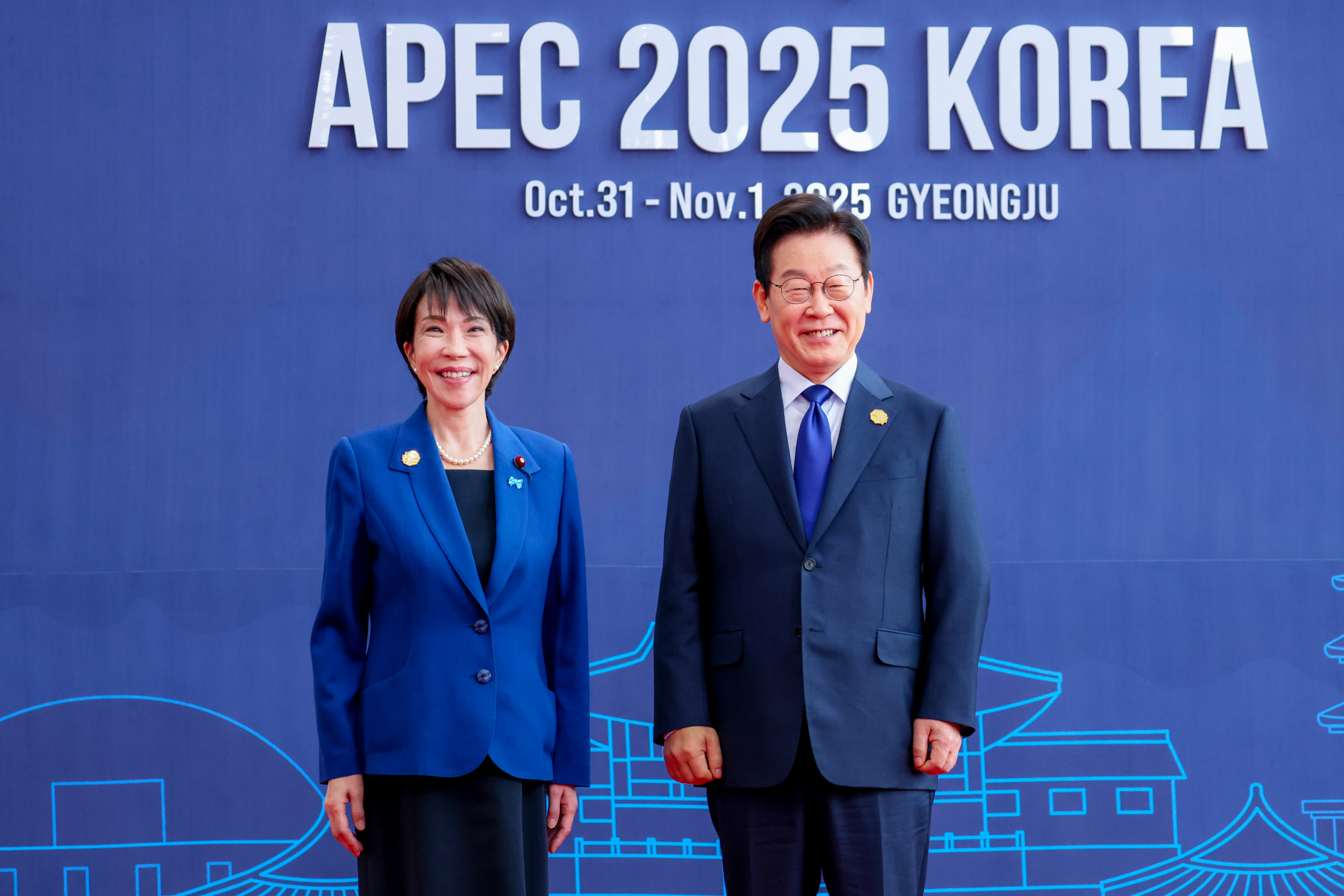
Lee Jae Myung with Japanese prime minister Sanae Takaichi at the APEC South Korea 2025 summit on 31 October 2025

Despite his critical statements regarding Japan in the past, Lee has generally focused on maintaining improved ties with Japan as president. He visited Japan in August 2025 for his first presidential trip abroad, becoming the first South Korean president to pick Japan as their first destination for a bilateral summit since the two countries established diplomatic ties in 1965. On 3 December 2025, Lee said that South Korea would not take sides between China and Japan during a diplomatic crisis between the two countries, which he said "would only escalate the conflict", and called on both countries to "seek ways to coexist". He also offered for South Korea to "play a role in mediating and coordination" between the two countries. After China announced dual-export restrictions on Japan in January 2026, the Ministry of Trade, Industry and Resources announced South Korea would "preemptively review whether it is possible to replace imported Japanese items subject to China's export curbs on dual-use goods in order to minimize negative impacts on supply chains".

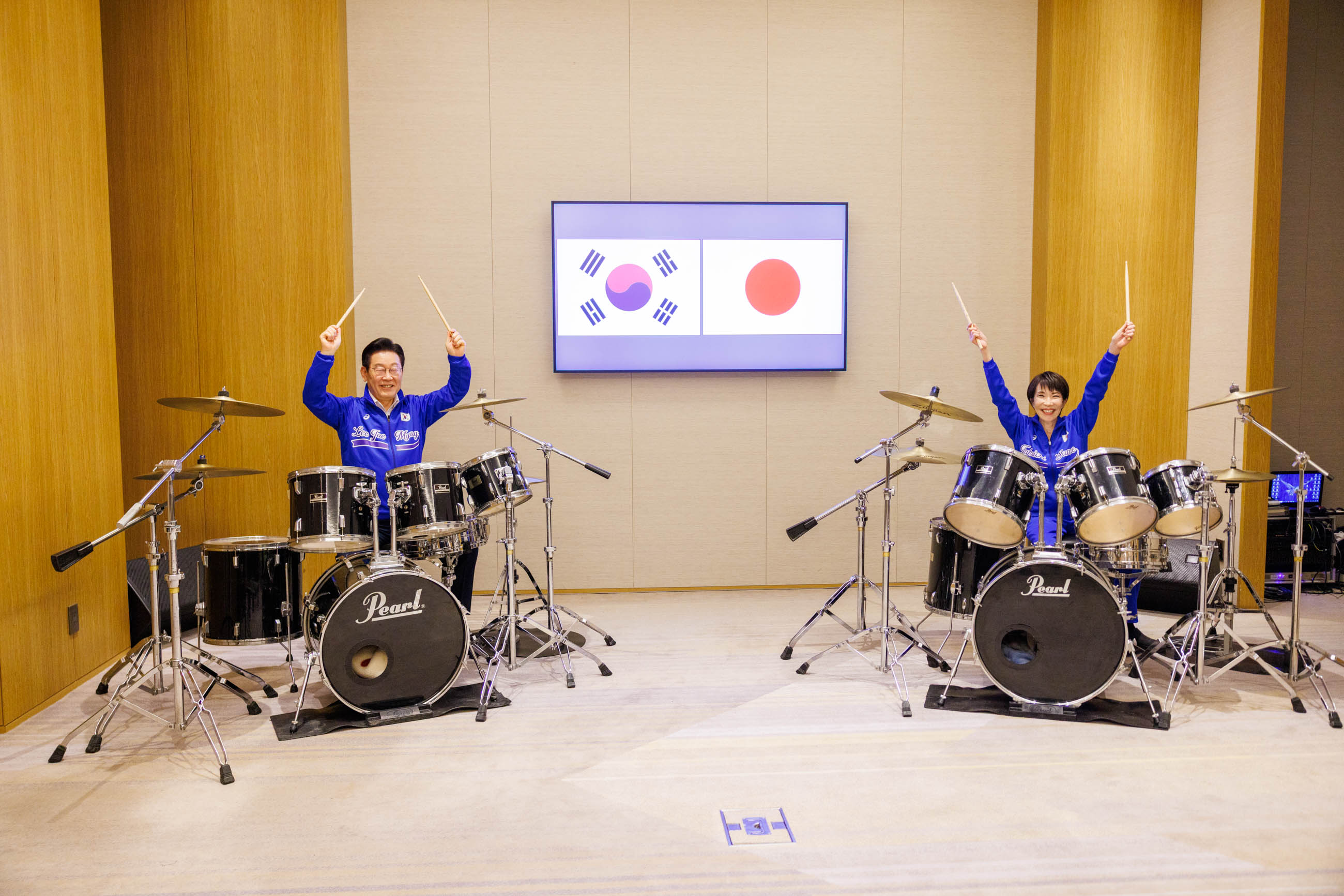
Lee drums with Takaichi at a South Korea-Japan summit in Nara, Japan on 13 January 2026

On 13 January 2026, he met Japanese Prime Minister Sanae Takaichi for a bilateral summit in Nara, Japan. Lee stated at the beginning of the summit "I believe cooperation between Korea and Japan is now more important than ever".

==== Southeast Asia ====
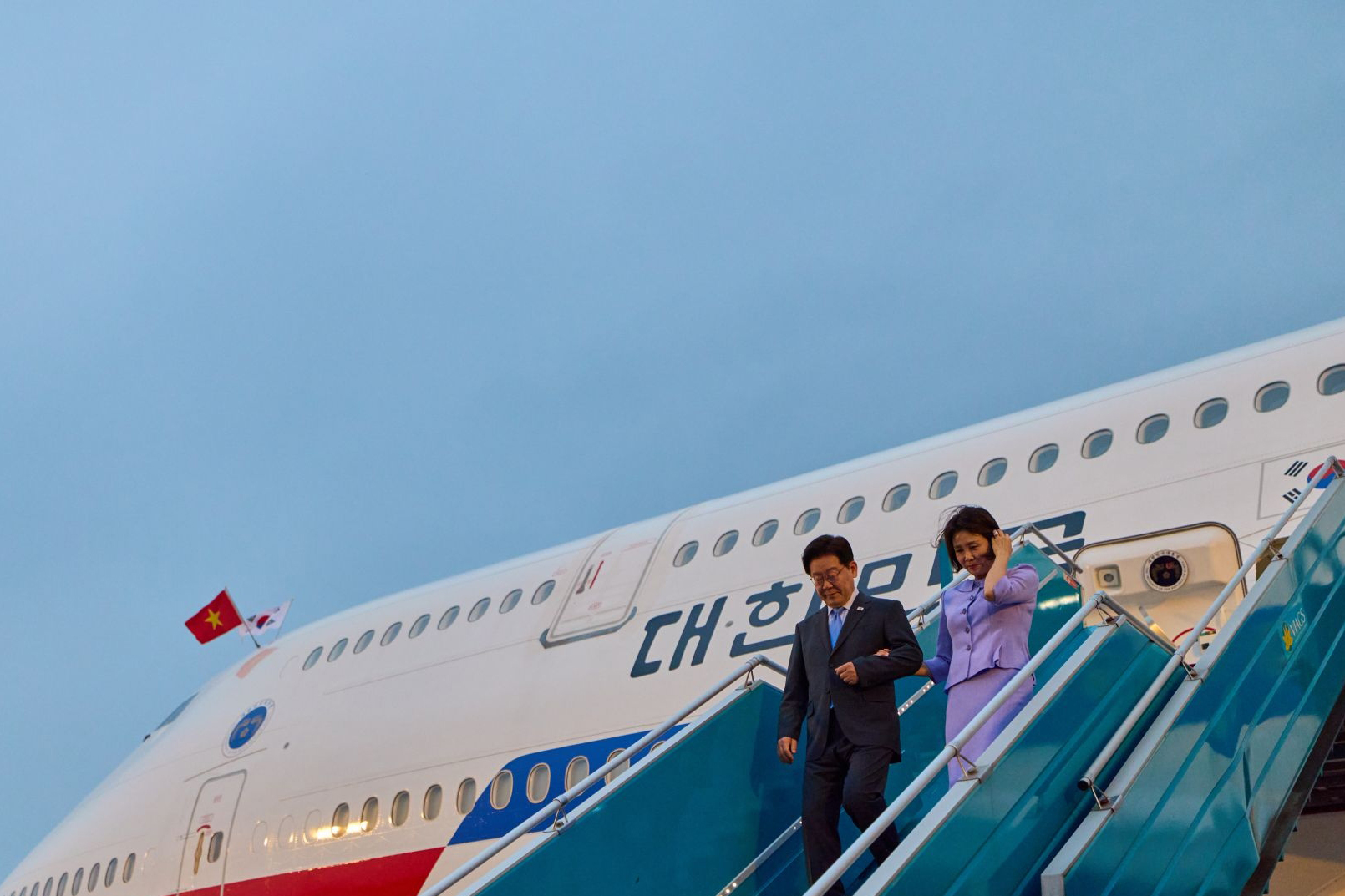
Lee arrived in Hanoi for his April 2026 state visit to Vietnam.

On 10 September 2025, Lee ordered the suspension of a development loan for bridge construction in the Philippines after reports showed it had been revived under political pressure despite earlier rejection over corruption risks. In response, the Philippine Department of Finance said that no such loan with South Korea existed.

===== Vietnam =====
Lee endorses stronger South Korea–Vietnam relations, receiving in 2025 the General Secretary of the Communist Party of Vietnam Tô Lâm as the first state guest of his presidency, as well as becoming Vietnam's first state guest after the country's 2026 party congress and general election. Alongside pushing for further economic, political and defense cooperation between the two countries, Lee projects to ease and enhance conditions to attract more Vietnamese migrant workers, especially within the Lai Đại Hàn group. Lee is critical of South Korean war crimes during the Vietnam War, even comparing them to Japanese atrocities in Korea. Lee has reportedly planned to publicly address the issue with Vietnam, however, the Vietnamese side privately turned down Lee's intention, citing its greater emphasis on future collaborations instead of talking about the painful past. On the other hand, Lee also seeks further Vietnamese participation in the peace process on the Korean Peninsula, probably addressing Vietnam's good relations with North Korea and its status as the host of the Second Trump-Kim Summit in Hanoi.

==== United States ====
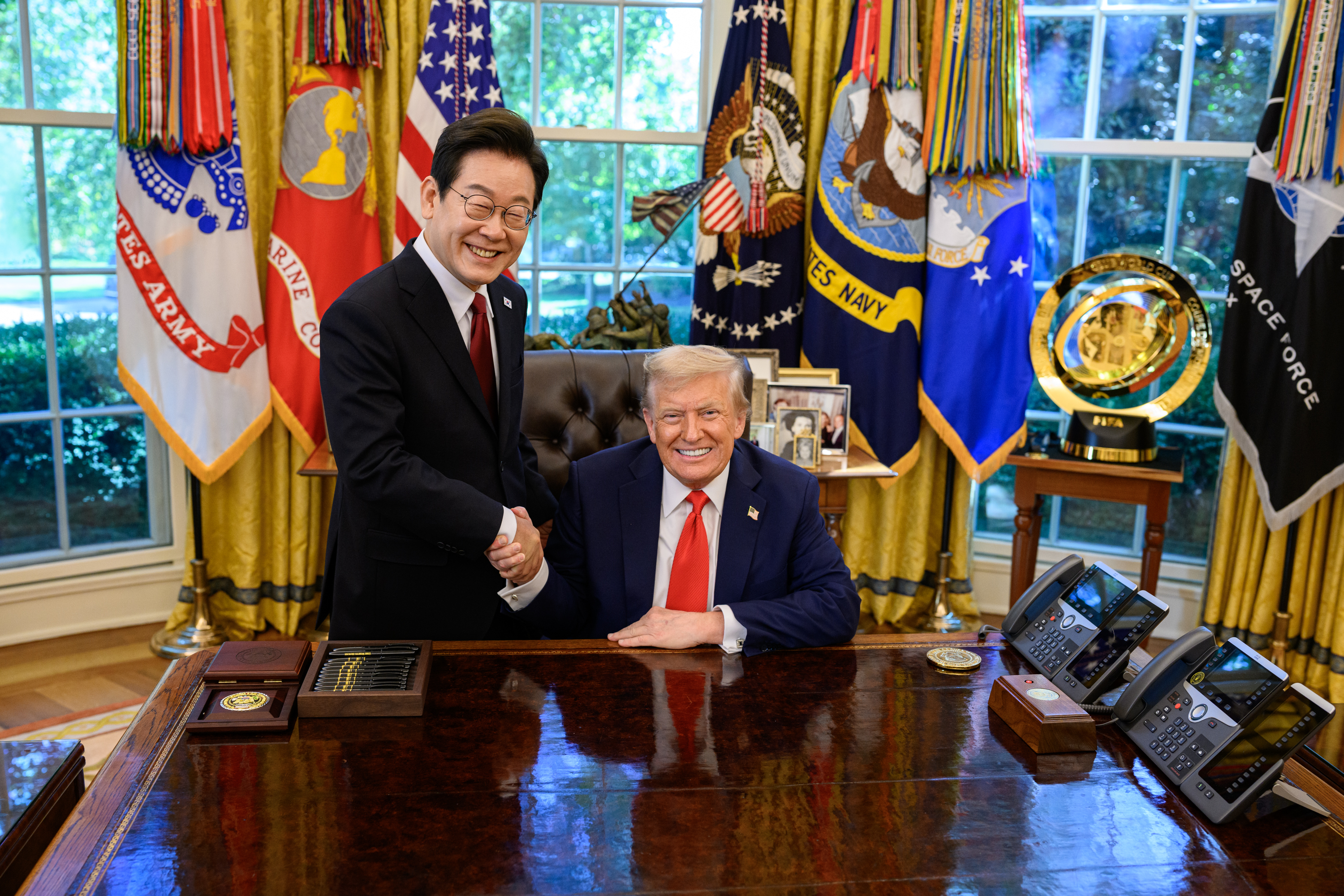
Lee with U.S. President Donald Trump in the Oval Office on 25 August 2025

On 25 August 2025, Lee participated in a bilateral meeting with U.S. President Donald Trump. On 29 October 2025, Lee hosted Trump in South Korea, giving him a gold crown and a golden Grand Order of Mugunghwa medal.

During a Cabinet meeting on 14 April 2026, Lee urged the parties involved in the 2026 Iran war to take "courageous steps" toward peace, citing a fragile ceasefire and high oil prices as significant threats to the global economy.

== Legal issues ==
In 2018 during the Gyeonggi gubernatorial election, Rep. Jeon Hae-cheol filed a complaint against the Twitter account @08_hkkim for publishing false information on elections. The police reported that they believed the account belonged to Lee's spouse. Prosecutors dropped the case, citing a lack of evidence.

In July 2020, the Supreme Court found Lee not guilty of breaching campaign law during a television debate for Gyeonggi provincial governor. In the debate, Lee denied that he had attempted to admit his brother to a psychiatric hospital. The Court and its lower courts determined that the allegation was true. However, deferring to freedom of expression during political campaigns, the Supreme Court said Lee did not "actively" distort the facts – and therefore did not breach campaign law – when he lied. Lee was represented by several lawyers including two former Supreme Court justices.

Lee has been at the center of an investigation into corporate donations and favors during his mayoral administration of Seongnam since 2022. In response, the opposition has accused the government of trying to distract from their failures by launching an investigation against the leader of the opposition.

In January 2023, he was summoned to the prosecutor's office for questioning, marking the first time a politician had been questioned about a criminal case since the country's transition to democracy. In February 2023, a motion for Lee's arrest by the prosecution was rejected by the National Assembly in an unexpectedly close vote, with 30 members from Lee's party voting in favour of the motion in a secret vote.

In March 2023, Lee was indicted on bribery, corruption, breach of trust and conflict of interests charges. He was accused of colluding with a group of private property developers when he was mayor of Seongnam, to help them make more than 800 billion won from the project, whilst simultaneously inflicting enormous losses of nearly 490 million won on the city. He was also accused of receiving or demanding more than 18 billion won from four companies in bribes to fund a football club in the city, in return for favours in his capacity as the Mayor. Lee said the indictment was "not surprising at all" and denied the accusations. He claimed the investigation was politically motivated and led by the Yoon Administration to take down a political opponent.

In September 2023, Seoul prosecutors sought another motion to arrest Lee on corruption charges for giving special favours to a land developer in the Baekhyeon-dong neighbourhood and sending 8 million dollars to North Korea through the Ssangbangwool Group. On 21 September, the Democratic-majority National Assembly approved the motion, with a 149–136 vote, with dozens of his own party members voting to arrest him. On that day, Justice Minister Han Dong-hoon issued an arrest warrant for Lee, marking a historic first, as the motion passed during a heated plenary session with 136 lawmakers opposing it. He was released after the Seoul Central District Court rejected the arrest warrant on 27 September.

In June 2024, Lee was indicted again, on bribery charges in an alleged scheme to transfer funds to North Korea and facilitate a visit to Pyongyang. He was accused of asking an underwear company to illegally transfer $8 million to North Korea between 2019 and 2020, during his tenure as governor of Gyeonggi Province, to facilitate a visit. Lee denied the charges.

On 15 November 2024, Lee was convicted by the Seoul Central District Court of making false statements during his 2022 presidential campaign in violation of the Public Official Election Act and was given a one-year suspended prison sentence over his denial of acquaintanceship with Kim Moon-ki, a former executive of Seongnam Development Corporation that was behind a corruption-ridden development project in Seongnam. On 25 November, Lee was acquitted by the same court of instigating a witness in a related case to commit perjury. Lee appealed the Public Official Election Act verdict between 21 November 2024 and 27 March 2025, the Seoul High Court acquitted Lee. On 1 May, the Supreme Court overturned Lee's acquittal and returned the case to the Seoul High Court.

On 24 March 2025, Lee was fined 3 million won ($2,043) by the Seoul Central District Court for defying an order to testify in the Seongnam Development Corporation case for a second time. On 26 March, the Seoul High Court overturned Lee's conviction for Public Office Election Act violation. On 28 March, Lee was again fined 5 million-won (US$3,407) by the Seoul Central District Court for refusing to testify in the Seongnam Development Corporation case for a third time.

== Political positions ==
=== Economic and social policy ===
Sampro TV's interview with Lee on economic policies

Lee tends to run a policy platform close to the centre-left in the Democratic Party of Korea. Lee advocates for New Deal liberalism economically and respects the policies of Franklin D. Roosevelt. On 10 October 2021, Lee said "We will change the graph of economic growth upward with a strong state-led economic revival policy. I'll learn from Roosevelt, who overcame the Great Depression with left-wing policy (좌파 정책)".

Lee announced his overarching economic policy vision as "Transformative and Fair Growth". Lee's view on the Korean economy is that many problems have arisen from the slowdown of economic growth. Low growth leads to fewer opportunities for younger generations, causing fiercer competition and social unrest. This is especially relevant for Korea, as the rules and institutions that have been designed for a high-growth catch-up economy no longer work well for an advanced economy.

Lee asserts that the slowdown of economic growth is related to the unfairness and polarization in many areas of the economy: for example, the gap between big monopolies and small and medium-sized enterprises, the differences between platforms and irregular workers, and inequalities in the real estate market. Unfair conventions distort people's economic incentives in a way that encourages rent-seeking activities, causing serious inefficiency in resource allocation.

Lee's growth strategy, "Transformative and Fair Growth" comprises a set of policies to make the economy fairer and more transformative. Innovations and transformation can be expedited on the basis of right incentives and fairer institutions. This strategy includes industrial policies for a "Green New Deal" and digital transformation, education reforms to help people adapt to the new environment, balancing market power among economic entities, measures for fair competition and labour market justice, and social safety nets to share risks related to the transformation.

His overall policy stance is close to social liberalism and moderate progressivism, but there are also some economic liberal tendencies, such as real estate tax cuts and partial corporate deregulation. This tendency toward economic liberalism has shifted to the right compared in recent years, and increased before and after the 2022 South Korean presidential election. Lee has complemented this shift with occasional rhetoric supporting traditional Buddhism's role in maintaining social cohesion nationwide, despite Lee being a Protestant who has emphasized Christians gaining political power.

Unlike most South Korean liberals, Lee often speaks favorably of former dictator Park Chung Hee. Lee said on 2 November 2021, "President Park Chung Hee created the Gyeongbu Expressway to open the way for manufacturing-oriented industrialization," adding, "The Lee Jae Myung administration will build an 'energy highway' that will open a new future while speeding through the decarbonised era." The Dong-A Ilbo, a conservative media outlet in South Korea, said Lee's state-led policies are closer to Park Chung Hee's authoritarianism than left-wing populism based on social equality.

When Lee evaluated Chun Doo-hwan's economic performance favourably on 11 December 2021, he was criticized by South Korea's liberal camp. The Justice Party's Sim Sang-jung said of Lee, "You seem to have become a presidential candidate for the [conservative] People Power Party while trying to differentiate yourself from the Moon Jae-in government". The People Power Party's presidential candidate, Yoon Suk Yeol, sarcastically said, "You can be our party's presidential candidate". In an editorial in The Hankyoreh, a South Korean centre-left liberal journalist who was critical of the dictatorship in the past strongly criticized Lee for forgetting his (liberal) "values" to win the votes of conservative voters.

==== Universal basic income ====
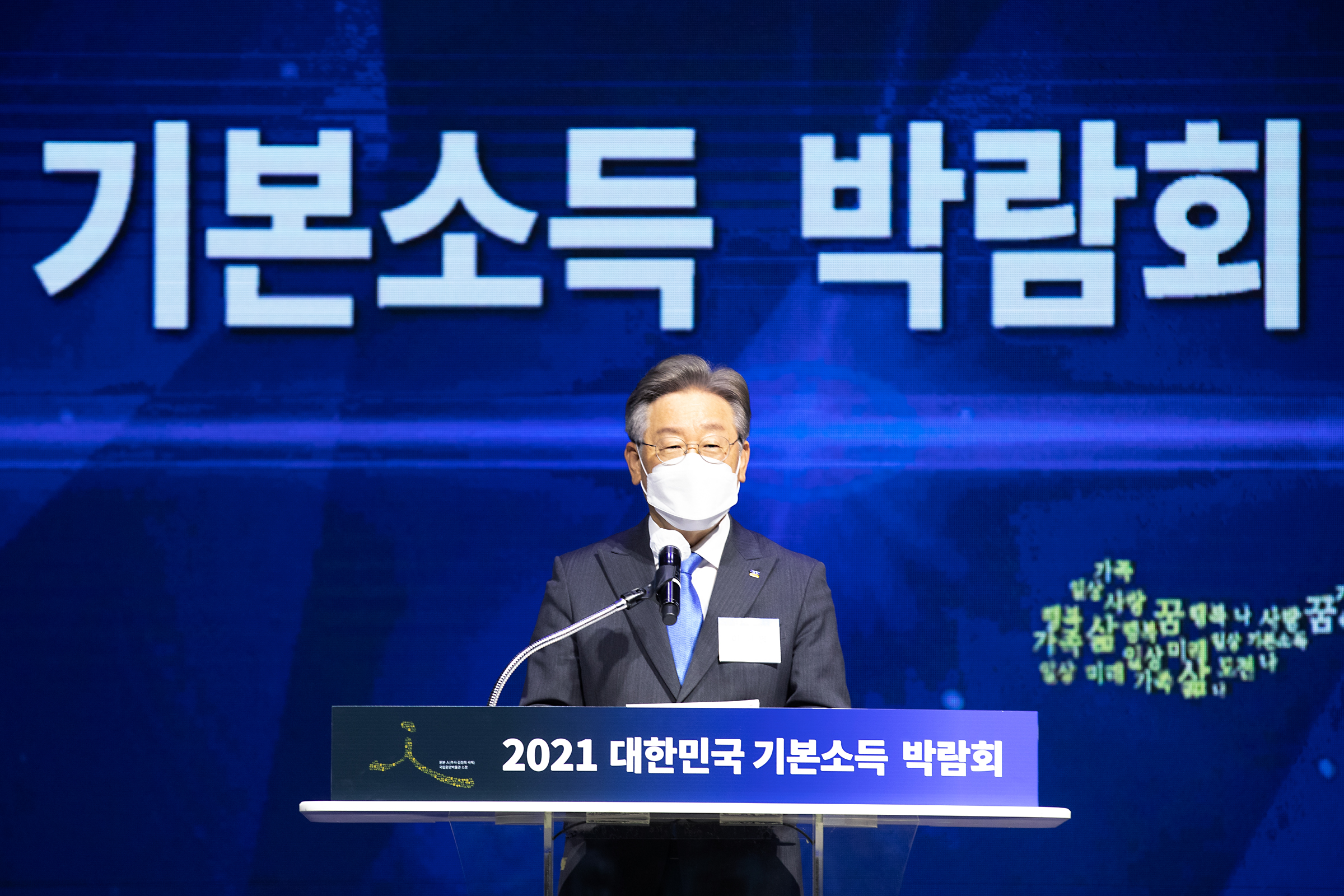
Lee at the 2021 Basic Income Expo

One of Lee's signature 2022 presidential campaign pledges was a promise to implement universal basic income. Lee implemented various basic income programs for residents during his time as mayor and governor.

During the 2022 campaign, Lee promised to introduce basic income to young people, farmers and fishermen first. Later, the program would expand to include all citizens, and the basic income amounts would increase. As part of this plan, Lee sought to link the basic income to a carbon tax and land value tax.

Lee pledged to introduce a universal basic income scheme at the national level for the first time in the world. He pledged to distribute 1,000,000 South Korean won (about US$900) per year to every citizen and ₩2,000,000 (about US$1,800) per year to youth aged between 19 and 29. Additional basic income would be considered for farmers, children, the elderly, and disabled people. Although the basic income program would start at a modest level, Lee indicated that the long-term goal is to increase basic income to ₩6,000,000 (about US$5,400) per year. Lee proposed the basic income plan would be financed by land value tax and carbon tax. Lee stressed that these taxes were necessary to curb real estate speculation and reduce carbon emissions.

==== Government-backed loans ====
Lee advocated for "basic loans," which would allow any citizen to take out government loans of up to ₩10,000,000 (US$8,750) at an interest rate of around 3 percent, regardless of their credit status. Lee advocated for these government-backed loan to the public as a safer alternative to borrowing money from loan sharks or private money lenders.

==== Technology ====
Lee emphasises the importance of data in digital transformation. During his tenure as the governor of Gyeonggi Province, Lee ordered that administrative official documents should use the open document format (ODF) instead of the previous Hangeul software. He also implemented the world's first data dividend, which returns the portion of the profit created by data-related business to the consumers who actually created the data. He used data analysis to combat African swine fever and prosecute illegal construction companies. He provided a mobile app to monitor the movements of COVID-19 confirmed patients without violating privacy and revealing personal information, using data encryption technology. Lee argues that the monopoly situation of big platform companies with network effects could be as an obstacle to fair growth of the digital sector, and argues that workers employed by platform enterprises should have new types of employment contracts so that they could be better protected in the digital era.

Lee states that South Korea should have future-oriented economic policies that take into account the role of artificial intelligence and its effect on society. He has stated that this shift will require government support to alleviate difficulties that might arise from the economic adjustment.

==== Trade policy ====
Lee has been described as a strong supporter of free trade. He opposes restrictions against South Korean semiconductor items due to U.S. trade protectionism.

==== Education ====
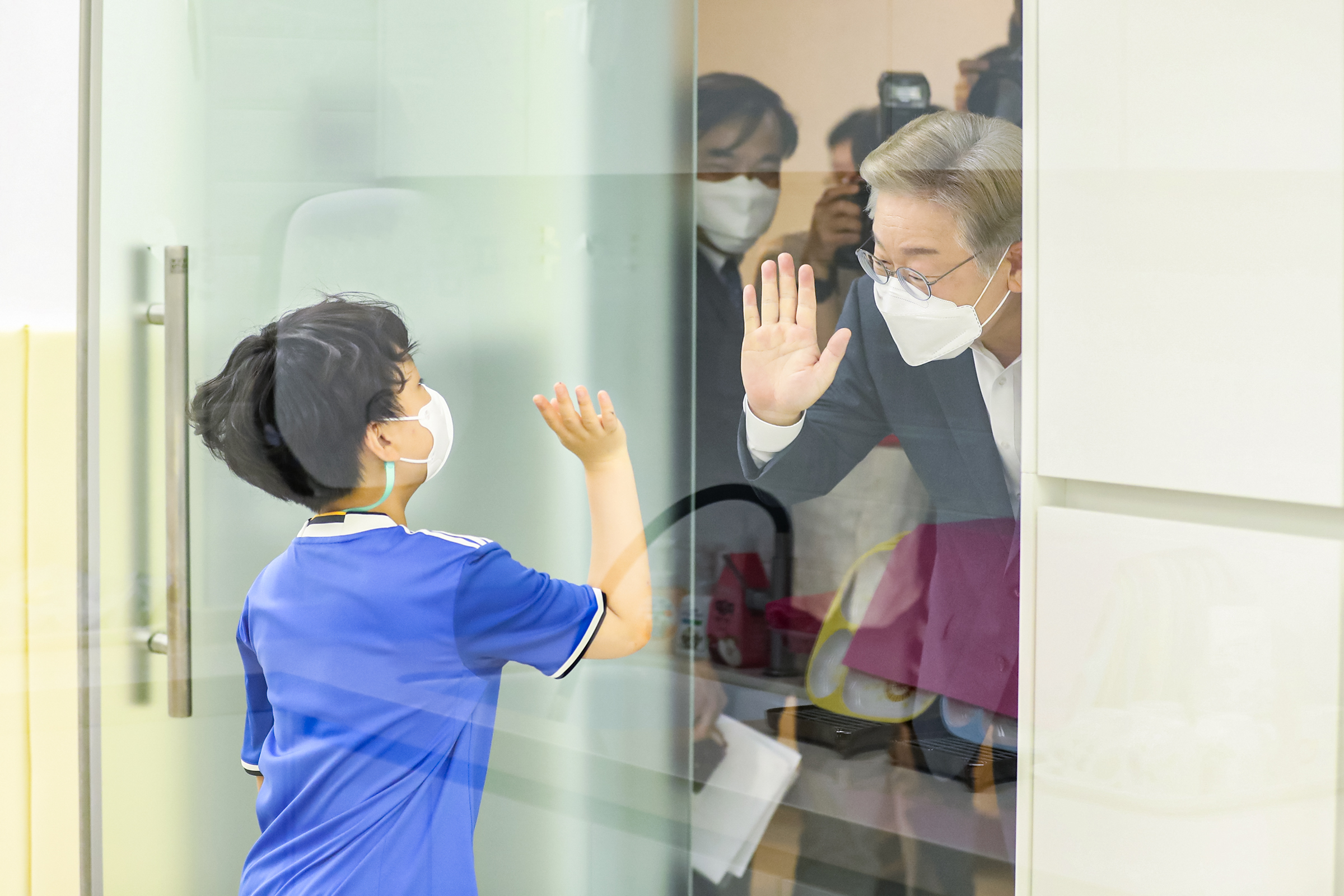
Lee during a visit to a child care center, 2021

One of Lee's election pledges was to avoid focusing on grades and numbers and instead proceed in the direction of strengthening student's capabilities. Lee said that in middle school teachers would determine student performance through summative assessments, and that he planned to launch a basic math curriculum through a 'high school credit system' in high school to make up for underachievement. He also suggested introducing AI-based personalized learning and evaluation in some subjects, such as mathematics, to strengthen individualized learning and evaluation throughout elementary and middle school.

Lee proposed an 'outdoor school' that fosters the challenges, adventures, cooperation, and curiosity necessary for adolescent growth. It promised to prepare and introduce a curriculum of about 10 hours per semester.

==== Youth policy ====
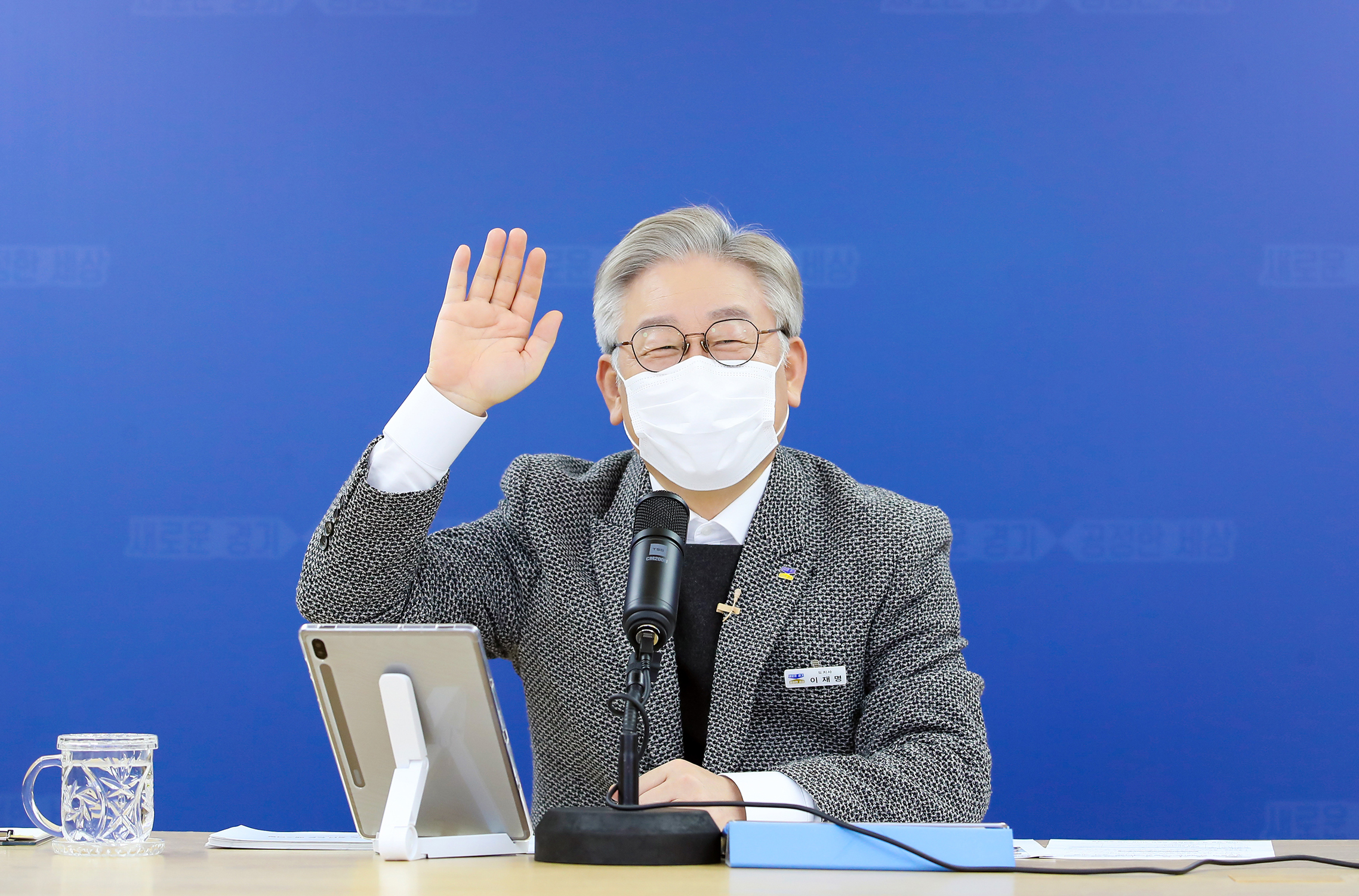
Lee on a youth radio show

Lee promised universal basic income and universal basic loans specifically for youth. He planned to provide one-time employment benefits to youth that voluntarily resigned from a job, in order to support job searching and career development. Lee planned to lower student loan interest rates and allow university tuition to be proportional to the credits students take each semester. Lastly, he planned to provide universal basic housing to youth and reform the housing market to help low-income youth buy and own their own homes.

==== LGBT rights ====
During the 2022 presidential election, Lee stated that he was positive on anti-discrimination laws, but was against abolishing the 'sodomy law' in the military and would not openly support the LGBTQ community. However, Lee stated more recently that he is against passing anti-discrimination laws with LGBTQ protection unilaterally without social consensus, and would not let it pass under his watch.

==== Feminism ====
Some media outlets, such as the New York Times, have characterized Lee Jae Myung as being hostile to feminism. On 8 November 2021, Lee distributed an article to participants of the National Election Commission stating, "If Lee Jae Myung differentiates himself from the Moon Jae-in government's feminist-first policy, he can gain support from young men". On 10 November, Lee shared a post written by a supporter on DC Inside on his Facebook page, which read, "Candidate Lee Jae Myung, please stop the 'feminism of madness' (of the Moon Jae-In government). If you promise to do so, I will vote [for you] with great pleasure".

Progressive politician Sim Sang-jung criticized Lee Jae Myung as a clear "anti-feminist". Ahn Cheol-soo, a centre-right conservative liberal, also criticized Lee Jae Myung's pledge on gender as "misogyny".

Lee Jae Myung created a subsidy for teens to purchase period products in 2016 and advocated for allowing medical insurance to be used to cover the cost of abortion and other contraceptive procedures. In this regard, it received positive reviews from feminists. Time magazine described Lee's women policy as "progressive". He strongly opposes the "abolition of the Ministry of Gender Equality and Family" (여성가족부 폐지) supported by the right-wing conservative camp.

Lee criticized Yoon Suk-Yeol's claim that structural gender inequality and misogyny do not exist in modern South Korean society and insisted on resolving structural gender discrimination. Lee has also called for a public apology for Yoon Suk-Yeol's comments that women are no longer discriminated against.

During his presidential campaign in 2022, Lee Jae Myung pledged to strengthen the punishment for sex crimes and expand government support for single-person female households. He also pledged to introduce a sexist workplace report and supervision system to prevent gender discrimination in the workplace. Concerning women's health, he pledged to increase government subsidy of sanitary pads and promote free HPV vaccines to prevent cervical cancer, as well as changing the name of the "Department of Obsterics and Gynecology" to the "Department of Women's Health Medicine".

==== Immigrant rights ====
Lee is a proponent of immigrant rights, emphasizing the need to improve the treatment of foreign workers and advocating for a human-rights-focused approach over a solely labor-centric immigration policy. However, he is also conservative on the excessive inflow of the immigrant workers. He pointed out that using foreign workers with low wages will do harm for domestic workers, so that companies should hire more domestic workers with proper wages rather than hiring foreigners with low wages. Under his presidency, foreign immigrant work visas decreased by 40%, and he instructed to review the system that allows autonomous visa issuance for local government. His government is also pushing for strengthening the Refugee Act, which would ban the denied asylum seeker’s re-application.

=== Foreign policy ===
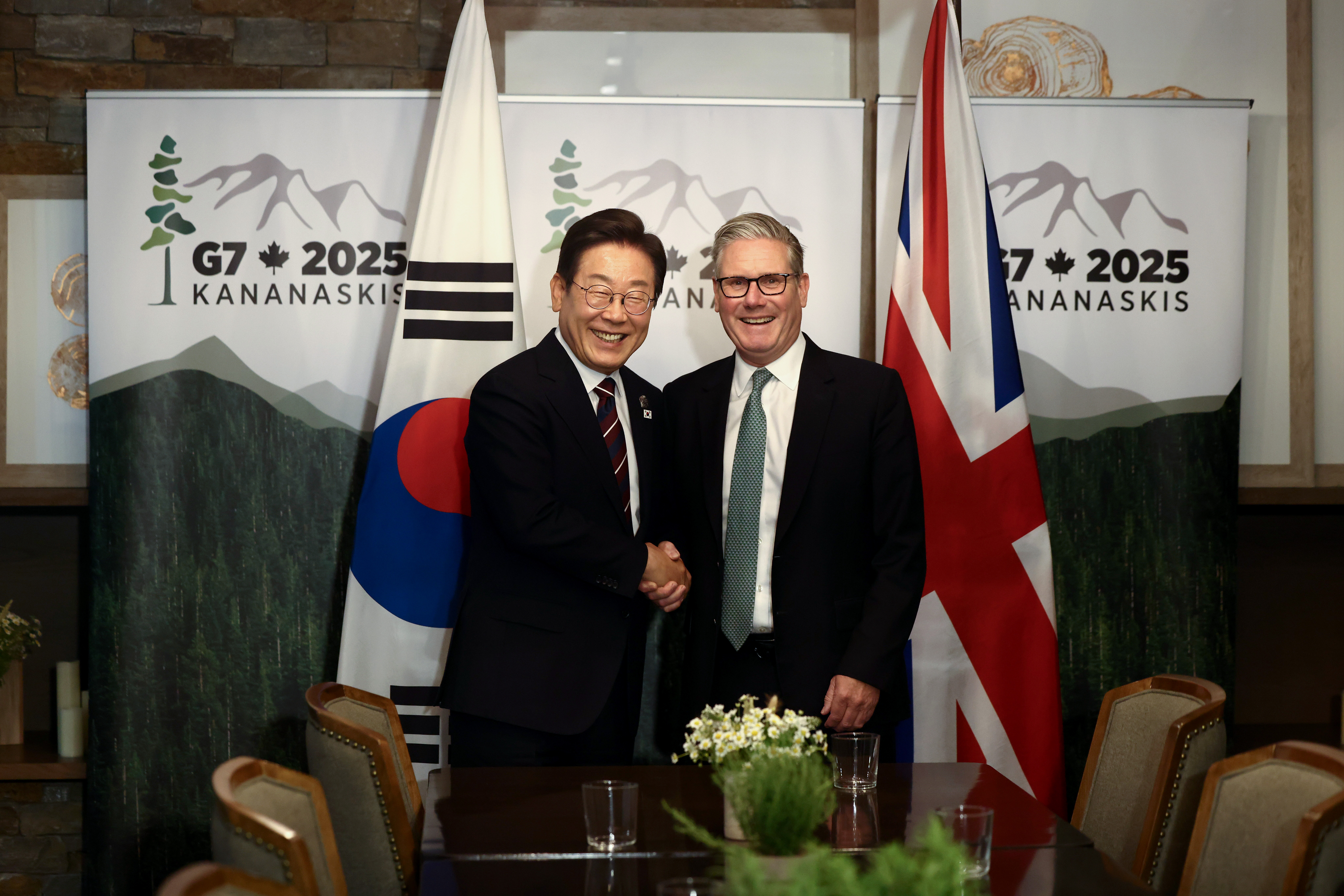
Lee and British Prime Minister Keir Starmer at the 51st G7 summit in Kananaskis, Canada, 17 June 2025

Lee revealed his diplomats about the United States and neighboring countries China and Japan as presidential candidates, while seeking friendly relations with North Korea. Lee announced a comprehensive foreign policy plan on 22 August 2021. He emphasized that the aim of foreign policy should be focused on improving the quality of the people and it should be practical to enhance national interest. Lee's foreign policy has been described as related to Korean nationalism.

==== North Korea ====
Lee stated that he will continue the efforts of previous liberal presidents to conduct peace talks with North Korea, citing President Kim Dae-jung's Sunshine Policy, President Roh Moo-hyun's summit with Kim Jong Il, and President Moon Jae-in's peace talks with North Korea. Lee favours the approach of a conditional rollback of sanctions on North Korea if it takes steps to denuclearize. While he believes in easing of sanctions, he also advocates immediate restoration of sanctions if North Korea fails to keep its denuclearization promises.

Shortly after taking office as president, Lee ordered a suspension of loudspeaker broadcasts across the DMZ into North Korea on 11 June 2025 as part of efforts to ease tensions and restore the Sunshine Policy.

==== United States ====
Lee awards U.S. President Donald Trump the Grand Order of Mugunghwa, making him the first U.S. president to ever receive the award.

Lee supports trade relations with the US. He also believes in good relations with the US military, which has its main bases in his province. However, he has criticized the US-deployed THAAD anti-missile system for prompting Chinese economic retaliation. Later, he said that as the THAAD is already deployed, the country must make a new decision on the US-ROK alliance and the progress of denuclearisation of North Korea.

Lee expressed his position on the issue between the US and China in South Korea's foreign policy, saying that the US is Korea's only ally and that friendly relations with the US are the most important.

==== China ====
Lee stated that while the United States is South Korea's only ally, China is also a strategic partner. He said, "There is no reason to narrow our range of movement by choosing one or the other side. It is competent diplomacy to make the U.S. and China choose to cooperate with us."

In response to a Korean Chinese performer wearing a hanbok at the opening ceremony of the 2022 Beijing Winter Olympics, Lee criticized China for "robbing and invading" Korean culture. In 2022, Lee said that if a Chinese fishing boat illegally breaks into South Korean waters, he would sink it.

In 2024, Lee criticized President Yoon for unnecessarily "antagonizing" China and creating a trade deficit with the country for the first time in decades. He also criticized Yoon's administration on the issue of Taiwan, saying "We should just say ‘xie xie’ [to China] and ‘xie xie’ to Taiwan as well. Why do we interfere in cross-strait [China-Taiwan] relations?"

==== Japan ====
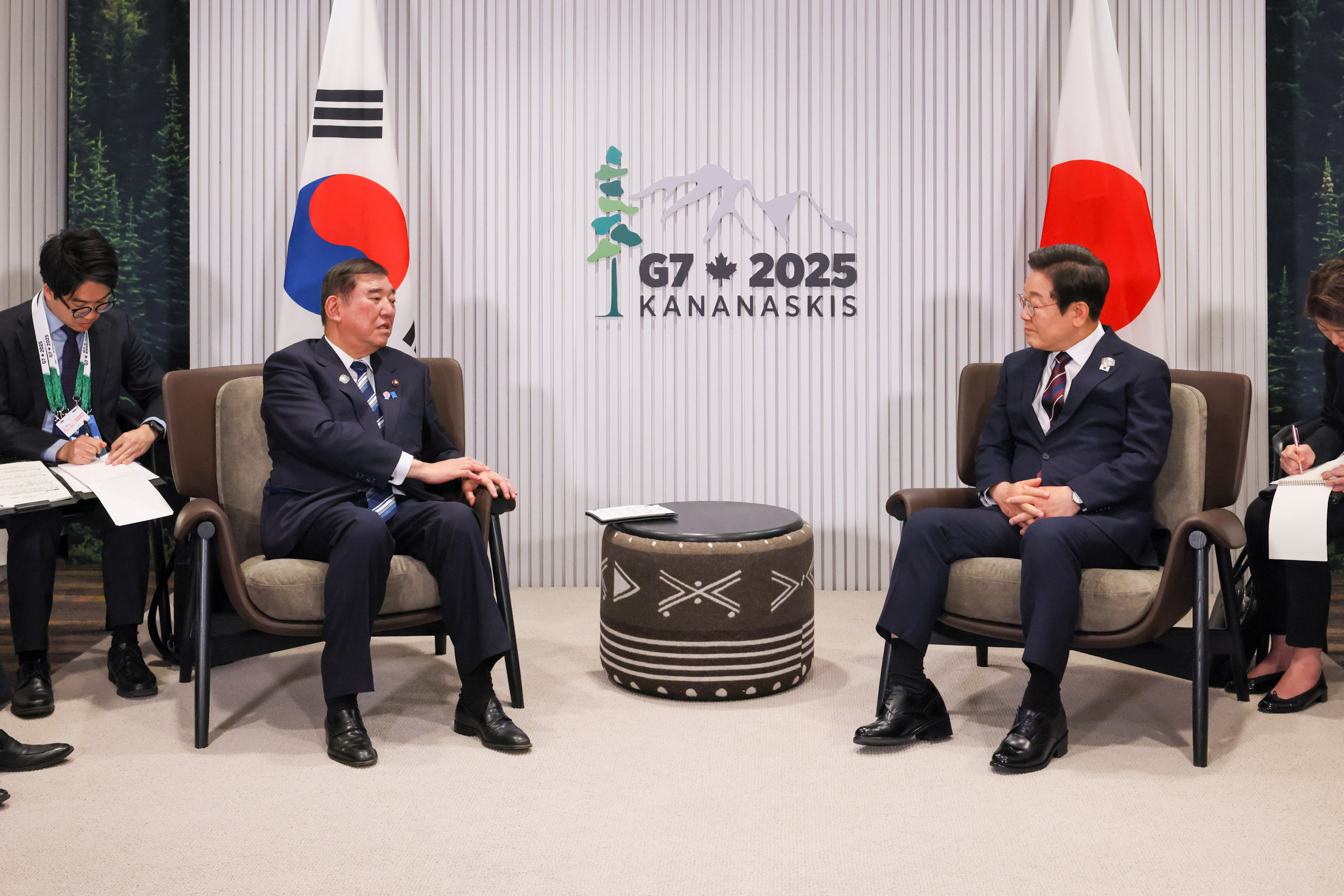
Lee and Japanese Prime Minister Shigeru Ishiba on 17 June 2025

In regards to relations with Japan, Lee is pursuing a "two track strategy" to promote economic, social, and diplomatic exchange and cooperation while also dealing with historical issues, territorial sovereignty, and the life and safety of the people.

Lee opposes to military training with the United States in which Japan participates, and he has described those who support training with Japan as "far-right chinil acts" (극단적 친일 행위).

In 2016, Lee said in an interview with an NHK reporter that Japan is South Korea's de facto 'enemy country'. He argues that if Japan increases its military power, it will be the first to invade South Korea. However, while critical of "Japanese imperialism" (일본 제국주의), Lee is not opposed to the South Korea-Japan military agreement, GSOMIA (지소미아), to maintain friendly relations with the United States, which calls for military cooperation between South Korea and Japan. GSOMIA is known to be what the United States demands from South Korea and Japan.

On 1 March 2018, Lee said that Japan which he referred to as "an aggressor country" (침략국가), rather than Korea, should have been divided into two countries following the Pacific War.

==== Russia ====
Lee has expressed opposition to the Russian invasion of Ukraine and does not oppose partial sanctions against Russia, yet he is considered to hold a relatively favorable perception of Russia by South Korean standards. In February 2022, he drew controversy by criticizing Ukrainian President Volodymyr Zelenskyy's foreign policy as "incompetent" and "provoking," for which he later apologized. Lee strongly opposes conservative calls for providing lethal arms aid to Ukraine, citing potential negative repercussions for the South Korean economy and security.

==== Israel ====
In April 2026, a diplomatic dispute occurred between South Korea and Israel after Lee shared a video on social media alleging Israeli military violence against Palestinians in the West Bank. Lee compared the actions in the video to historical atrocities, stating there was "no difference" between these acts and the Holocaust, the "massacre of Jews," or the issue of "comfort women" (sexual slavery by the Japanese military during WWII). The Israeli Foreign Ministry called Lee's comments "unacceptable" and accused him of trivializing the Holocaust. Lee later clarified that the video dated to 2024 but maintained his criticism, expressing "disappointment" at Israel’s response and urging the country to "reflect on the criticisms from people around the world" regarding human rights and international law.

==== Vietnam ====
Lee supports stronger relations with Vietnam, while also endorses measures to welcome more Vietnamese workers, including the Lai Đại Hàn. Lee recognizes South Korean war crimes in Vietnam, comparing those to Japanese atrocities and as the opposition leader under Yoon Suk Yeol's presidency, he formally supported South Korean court's decision ordering the government to pay reparations for Vietnamese war crime victims.

== Personal life ==
Lee is married to Kim Hea Kyung since 1991; the two first met in August 1990. They have two children together.

== Awards ==
=== National awards ===
South Korea

- Recipient of the Grand Order of Mugunghwa (4 June 2025) (as the President of South Korea)

=== Foreign awards ===
Italy:

- Knight Grand Cross with Collar of the Order of Merit of the Italian Republic (11 June 2026)

France:

- Grand Cross of the Legion of Honour (8 September 2026)

== Electoral history ==
2006 Gyeonggi Seongnam mayoral election
| Party | Candidate | Votes | % |
|---|---|---|---|
| Grand National | Lee Dae-yup | 177,531 | 54.01 |
| Uri | Lee Jae Myung | 78,059 | 23.75 |
| Democratic | Jang Yeong-ha | 38,144 | 11.60 |
| Democratic Labor | Kim Mi-hee | 34,909 | 10.62 |
| Total votes | | 331,884 | 100.0 |
| Grand National hold | | | |

2008 South Korean legislative election – Seongnam Bundang A, Gyeonggi Province
| Party | Candidate | Votes | % |
|---|---|---|---|
| Grand National | Ko Heong-gil | 46,396 | 64.73 |
| UDP | Lee Jae Myung | 23,822 | 33.23 |
| PUFP | Choi Jeong-hwan | 1,455 | 2.03 |
| Total votes | | 72,490 | 100.0 |
| Grand National hold | | | |

2010 Gyeonggi Seongnam mayoral election
| Party | Candidate | Votes | % |
|---|---|---|---|
| Democratic | Lee Jae Myung | 201,047 | 51.16 |
| Grand National | Hwang Joon-gi | 169,510 | 43.14 |
| Independent | Lee Dae-yup | 22,360 | 5.69 |
| Total votes | | 397,878 | 100.0 |
| Democratic gain from Grand National | | | |

2014 Gyeonggi Seongnam mayoral election
| Party | Candidate | Votes | % |
|---|---|---|---|
| NPAD | Lee Jae Myung | 239,685 | 55.05 |
| Saenuri | Shin Yeong-su | 191,749 | 44.04 |
| The New Politics | Heo Jae-ahn | 3,901 | 0.89 |
| Total votes | | 448,996 | 100.0 |
| NPAD hold | | | |

2018 Gyeonggi gubernatorial election
| Party | Candidate | Votes | % |
|---|---|---|---|
| Democratic | Lee Jae Myung | 3,370,621 | 56.40 |
| Liberty Korea | Nam Kyung-pil | 2,122,433 | 35.51 |
| Bareunmirae | Kim Young-hwan | 287,504 | 4.81 |
| Justice | Lee Hong-woo | 151,871 | 2.54 |
| Minjung | Hong Sung-kyu | 43,098 | 0.72 |
| Total votes | | 5,975,527 | 100.0 |
| Democratic gain from Liberty Korea | | | |

2022 South Korean presidential election
| Party | Candidate | Votes | % |
|---|---|---|---|
| People Power | Yoon Suk Yeol | 16,394,815 | 48.56 |
| Democratic | Lee Jae Myung | 16,147,738 | 47.83 |
| Justice | Sim Sang-jung | 803,358 | 2.38 |
| National Revolutionary | Huh Kyung-young | 281,481 | 0.83 |
| Progressive | Kim Jae-yeon | 37,366 | 0.11 |
| Our Republican | Cho Won-jin | 25,972 | 0.08 |
| Basic Income | Oh Jun-ho | 18,105 | 0.05 |
| Korean Wave Alliance | Kim Min-chan | 17,305 | 0.05 |
| Korean Unification | Lee Gyeong-hee | 11,708 | 0.03 |
| Labor | Lee Baek-yun | 9,176 | 0.03 |
| New Liberal Democratic Union | Kim Gyeong-jae | 8,317 | 0.02 |
| Saenuri | Ok Un-ho | 4,970 | 0.01 |
| Total votes | | 33,760,311 | 100.00 |
| People Power gain from Democratic | | | |

June 2022 South Korean by-elections – Gyeyang B, Incheon
| Party | Candidate | Votes | % |
|---|---|---|---|
| Democratic | Lee Jae Myung | 44,289 | 55.24 |
| People Power | Yoon Hyeong-seon | 35,886 | 44.75 |
| Total votes | | 80,175 | 100.0 |
| Democratic hold | | | |

2024 South Korean legislative election – Gyeyang B, Incheon
| Party | Candidate | Votes | % |
|---|---|---|---|
| Democratic | Lee Jae Myung | 48,365 | 54.12 |
| People Power | Won Hee-ryong | 40,616 | 45.45 |
| Tomorrow, Future | Choi Chang-won | 373 | 0.41 |
| Total votes | | 89,354 | 100.0 |
| Democratic hold | | | |

2025 South Korean presidential election
| Party | Candidate | Votes | % |
|---|---|---|---|
| Democratic | Lee Jae Myung | 17,287,513 | 49.42 |
| People Power | Kim Moon-soo | 14,395,639 | 41.15 |
| Reform | Lee Jun-seok | 2,917,523 | 8.34 |
| Justice | Kwon Yeong-guk | 344,150 | 0.98 |
| Independent | Song Jin-ho | 35,791 | 0.10 |
| Total votes | | 35,236,497 | 100.00 |
| Democratic gain from People Power | | | |

=== Primary election ===
2017 South Korean presidential election Democratic Primary
| Party | Candidate | Votes | % |
|---|---|---|---|
| Democratic | Moon Jae-in | 936,419 | 57.0 |
| Democratic | Ahn Hee-jung | 353,631 | 21.5 |
| Democratic | Lee Jae Myung | 347,647 | 21.2 |
| Democratic | Choi Sung | 4,943 | 0.3 |
| Total votes | | 1,642,677 | 100.0 |

2022 South Korean presidential election Democratic Primary
| Party | Candidate | Votes | % |
|---|---|---|---|
| Democratic | Lee Jae Myung | 719,905 | 50.3 |
| Democratic | Lee Nak-yon | 560,392 | 39.1 |
| Democratic | Choo Mi-ae | 129,035 | 9.0 |
| Democratic | Park Yong-jin | 22,261 | 1.6 |
| Total votes | | 1,431,593 | 100.0 |

2025 South Korean presidential election Democratic Primary
| Party | Candidate | Votes | % |
|---|---|---|---|
| Democratic | Lee Jae Myung | 623,695 | 89.8 |
| Democratic | Kim Dong-yeon | 41,307 | 6.9 |
| Democratic | Kim Kyoung-soo | 25,512 | 3.4 |
| Total votes | | 690,514 | 100.0 |

== Authored books ==
- Lee Jae Myung (20 February 2010). 고난을 통해 희망을 만들다 [Make hope through hardship] (in Korean). Seoul: Cheongdonggeoul. ISBN 978-89-5749-128-7.
- ——— (20 February 2014). 오직 민주주의, 꼬리를 잡아 몸통을 흔들다 [Only democracy, Grab the tail and shake the body] (in Korean). Paju: LeeBook. ISBN 978-89-97496-21-1.
- ——— (20 January 2017). 이재명, 대한민국 혁명하라 [Lee Jae Myung, Revolutionize Korea] (in Korean). Seoul: Medici Media. ISBN 979-11-5706-077-1.
- ———; Seo Hae-seong (3 February 2017). 이재명의 굽은 팔 [Lee Jae Myung's curved arm] (in Korean). Paju: Gimm-Young Publishers. ISBN 978-89-349-7719-3.
- ——— (7 February 2017). 이재명은 합니다 [Lee Jae Myung Do] (in Korean). Seoul: Wisdom House. ISBN 978-89-6086-325-5.
- ———; Cho Jung-mi (17 October 2018). 나의 소년공 다이어리 [My factory boy's diary] (in Korean) (1st ed.). Bucheon: Fandom Books. ISBN 979-11-6169-058-2.

== See also ==
- List of current heads of state and government
- List of heads of the executive by approval rating
- List of current state leaders by date of assumption of office

== Notes ==
Political offices
| Preceded by Lee Dae-yup | Mayor of Seongnam; 1 July 2010–15 March 2018 | Succeeded by Lee Jae-cheol (Acting); Eun Soo-mi |
| Preceded by Nam Kyung-pil | Governor of Gyeonggi Province; 1 July 2018–25 October 2021 | Succeeded by Oh Byeong-Kwon (Acting); Kim Dong-yeon |
| Preceded by Yoon Suk Yeol; Han Duck-soo (Acting); Choi Sang-mok (Acting); Han Duck-soo (Acting); Lee Ju-ho (Acting) | President of South Korea; 4 June 2025–present | Incumbent |
Diplomatic posts
| Preceded by (Peru) Dina Boluarte | Chairperson of APEC; 2025 | Succeeded by (China) Xi Jinping |
| Preceded by (United Kingdom) Andy Burnham | Chairperson of the Group of 20; 2028 | Succeeded by TBA |
Party political offices
| Preceded by Moon Jae-in | Democratic Party nominee for President of South Korea; 2022, 2025 | Most recent |
| Preceded by Song Young-gil; Yun Ho-jung, Park Ji-hyun (ERC); Park Hong-keun (Interim); Woo Sang-ho (Interim); Lee Jae Myung (Himself); Park Chan-dae (Acting) | Leader of the Democratic Party; 28 August 2022–24 June 2024; 18 August 2024–9 April 2025 | Succeeded by Park Chan-dae (Acting); Lee Jae Myung (Himself); Park Chan-dae (Acting); Kim Byung-kee (Acting); Jung Chung-rae |
National Assembly of the Republic of Korea
| Preceded by Song Young-gil | Member of the National Assembly from Gyeyang District B (Incheon); 2 June 2022–4 June 2025 | Succeeded by Kim Nam-jun |
