= Sejong National Research Complex =

Research facility in Sejong, South Korea

Coordinates: 36.4952°N 127.3046°E

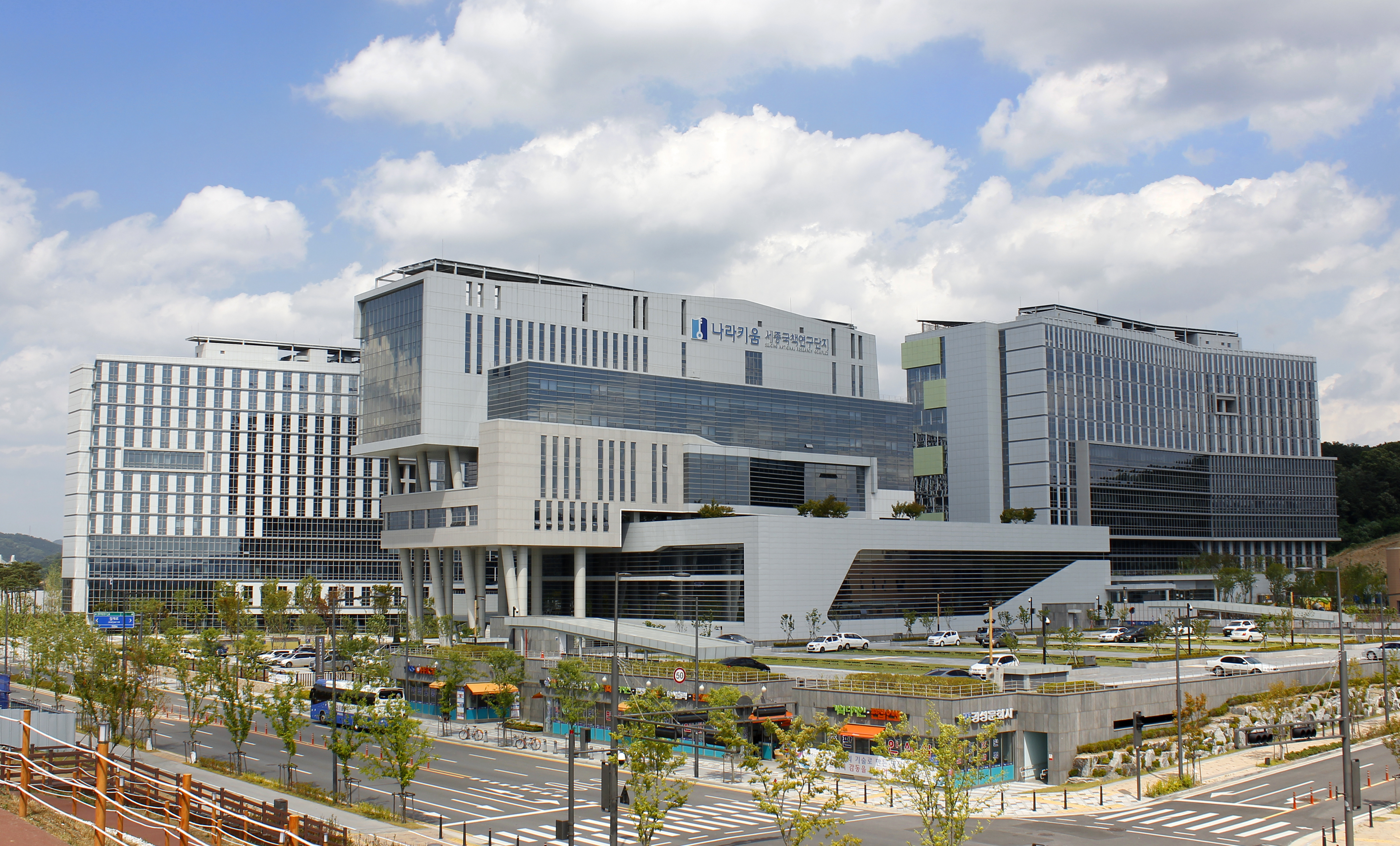
- Formation: 2014
- Type: Government research center
- Headquarters: 370, Sicheong-daero
- Location: Sejong, South Korea

- Sejong National Research Complex
- Hangul: 세종국책연구단지
- Hanja: 世宗國策硏究團地
- RR: Sejong gukchaek yeongu danji
- MR: Sejong kukch'aek yŏn'gu tanji

The Sejong National Research Complex is a campus comprising four research buildings housing ten research institutes. Institutes started to relocate to the complex in 2014. It neighbors the Korea Institute of Public Finance (ko), Korea Legislation Research Institute (ko), and the Korea Research Institute for Human Settlements, (ko) and is approximately 1.6 kilometers away from the Korea Development Institute.

== Research Institutes ==
The research complex is divided into four primary buildings, A, B, C, and D, each divided by topic of research.

=== A - Research Support ===
National Research Council for Economics, Humanities and Social Sciences (NRC)
Science and Technology Policy Institute (STEPI) (part of 3rd floor)
National Research Council of Science and Technology (NST)

=== B - Science and Infrastructure ===
Korea Transport Institute (KOTI)
Science and Technology Policy Institute (STEPI)
Korea Environment Institute (KEI)

=== C - Economic Policy ===
Korea Institute for International Economic Policy (KIEP)
Korea Labor Institute (KLI)
Korea Institute for Industrial Economics and Trade (KIET)

=== D - Social Policy ===
Korea Institute for Health and Social Affairs (KIHASA)
National Youth Policy Institute (NYPI)
Korea Research Institute for Vocational Education and Training (KRIVET)
