= Gyeyang B =

Constituency in Incheon, South Korea

- Single-member constituency for the National Assembly
- Location of the constituency
- District(s): Gyeyang District
- Region: Incheon
- Electorate: 137,090 (2022)

Current constituency
- Created: 2004
- Seats: 1
- Party: Democratic Party
- Member: Kim Nam-jun
- Created from: Gyeyang (constituency)

Gyeyang B (Korean: 계양구 을; Hanja: 桂陽區 乙) is a constituency of the National Assembly of South Korea. The constituency consists part of Gyeyang District, Incheon. As of 2022, 137,090 eligible voters were registered in the constituency.

== History ==
Gyeyang B was created ahead of the 2004 South Korean legislative election from the former Gyeyang constituency as a result of an increase in the area's voter population.

The constituency is considered a Democratic Party stronghold, electing candidates affiliated with the Democratic Party and its predecessor parties every election except for a by-election that was held in 2010. It was represented by President Lee Jae-myung from 2022 to 2025.

== Boundaries ==
The constituency encompasses the neighborhoods Gyesan-dong and Gyeyang-dong.

== List of Members of the National Assembly from Gyeyang B ==
Election	Member	Party	Dates	Notes
2004	Song Young-gil	Uri	2000-2010	Secretary General of the Uri Party (2007); Resigned to run for Mayor of Incheon
2008	Song Young-gil	United Democratic	2000-2010	Secretary General of the Uri Party (2007); Resigned to run for Mayor of Incheon
2010 by-election	Lee Sang-kwon	Grand National	2010-2012	
2012	Choi Won-sik	Democratic United	2012-2016	
2016	Song Young-gil	Democratic	2016-2022	Mayor of Incheon (2010–2014); Leader of the Democratic Party (2021–2022) Resigned to run for Mayor of Seoul
2020	Song Young-gil	Democratic	2016-2022	Mayor of Incheon (2010–2014); Leader of the Democratic Party (2021–2022) Resigned to run for Mayor of Seoul
2022 by-election	Lee Jae Myung	Democratic	2022–2025	Mayor of Seongnam (2010–2018); Governor of Gyeonggi Province (2018–2021); Leader of the Democratic Party (2022–2025); Resigned to take the office of President of South Korea in June 2025. President of South Korea (2025–)
2024	Lee Jae Myung	Democratic	2022–2025	Mayor of Seongnam (2010–2018); Governor of Gyeonggi Province (2018–2021); Leader of the Democratic Party (2022–2025); Resigned to take the office of President of South Korea in June 2025. President of South Korea (2025–)
2026 by-election	Kim Nam-jun	Democratic	2026-2028	presidential Co-spokesperson (2025–2026)

== Election results ==
=== 2024 ===
Legislative Election 2024: Gyeyang B
Party	Candidate	Votes	%	±%
Democratic	Lee Jae Myung	48,365	54.12	▼1.12
People Power	Won Hee-ryong	40,616	45.45	▲0.7
Tomorrow Future	Choi Chang-won	373	0.41	new
Rejected ballots		1,495	–	
Turnout		90,849	71.34	▲11.21
Registered electors		127,351		
Democratic hold		Swing		

=== 2022 by-election ===
2022 by-election: Gyeyang B
Party	Candidate	Votes	%	±%
Democratic	Lee Jae Myung	44,289	55.24	−3.43
People Power	Yoon Hyeong-seon	35,886	44.75	+6.01
Rejected ballots		2,259	–	
Turnout		82,434	60.13	–
Registered electors		137,090		
Democratic hold		Swing		

=== 2020 ===
Legislative Election 2020: Gyeyang B
Party	Candidate	Votes	%	±%
Democratic	Song Young-gil	51,821	58.67	+15.38
United Future	Yoon Hyeong-seon	34,222	38.74	+7.48
Minjung	Go Hye-gyeong	1,538	1.74	new
National Revolutionary	Chung Dae-soo	740	0.83	new
Rejected ballots		977	–	
Turnout		89,298	62.66	–
Registered electors		142,502		
Democratic hold		Swing		

=== 2016 ===
Legislative Election 2016: Gyeyang B
Party	Candidate	Votes	%	±%
Democratic	Song Young-gil	35,197	43.29	−12.97
Saenuri	Yoon Hyeong-seon	25,420	31.26	−12.47
People	Choi Won-sik	20,679	25.43	new
Rejected ballots		779	–	
Turnout		82,075	57.03	+7.37
Registered electors		143,927		
Democratic hold		Swing		

=== 2012 ===
Legislative Election 2012: Gyeyang B
Party	Candidate	Votes	%	±%
Democratic United	Choi Won-sik	38,045	56.26	+13.43
Saenuri	Lee Sang-kwon	29,568	43.73	−3.89
Rejected ballots		548	–	
Turnout		68,161	49.66	+26.49
Registered electors		137,257		
Democratic United gain from Saenuri		Swing		

=== 2010 by-election ===
2010 by-election: Gyeyang B
Party	Candidate	Votes	%	±%
Grand National	Lee Sang-kwon	14,444	47.62	+6.47
Democratic	Kim Hee-gap	12,992	42.83	−3.26
Democratic Labor	Park In-sook	2,313	7.62	+1.78
Independent	Lee Gi-cheol	579	1.91	new
Rejected ballots		89	–	
Turnout		30,417	23.17	−19.2
Registered electors		131,281		
Grand National gain from Democratic		Swing		

=== 2008 ===
Legislative Election 2008: Gyeyang B
Party	Candidate	Votes	%	±%
United Democratic	Song Young-gil	23,731	46.09	new
Grand National	Lee Sang-kwon	21,182	41.15	+3.77
Democratic Labor	Park In-sook	3,008	5.84	new
Liberty Forward	Park Hee-ryong	2,626	5.10	new
Family Party for Peace and Unity	Song Kwak-seok	932	1.81	new
Rejected ballots		307	–	
Turnout		51,786	42.37	−14.8
Registered electors		122,224		
United Democratic hold		Swing		

=== 2004 ===
Legislative Election 2004: Gyeyang B
Party	Candidate	Votes	%	±%
Uri	Song Young-gil	37,706	56.24	–
Grand National	Lee Sang-kwon	23,069	37.38	–
Millennium Democratic	Chung Chang-gyo	3,934	6.38	–
Rejected ballots		670	–	
Turnout		62,379	57.17	–
Registered electors		109,102		
Uri win (new seat)				

== See also ==
- List of constituencies of the National Assembly of South Korea
