= Korea discount =

Phenomenon in the South Korean stock market

The Korea discount (Korean: 코리아 디스카운트) is the phenomenon in South Korea where companies listed on the Korea Exchange are valued lower compared to their global counterparts due to various factors. Factors include poor corporate governance and tensions with North Korea.

== Factors ==
=== Chaebols ===
The country's prominent chaebol structures give disproportionately low benefits to non-family stakeholders and have been cited as a discount factor. However, empirical evidence shows that chaebols themselves have lower discounts than non-chaebols.

=== Dividends ===
South Korea has riskier and lower dividend payouts compared to other advanced markets.

=== Geopolitical risk ===
In March 2026, President Lee Jae Myung cited geopolitical risk exaggerated by political circles as a factor in the discount.

=== Split listing ===
In April 2026, the Financial Services Commission announced that it would ban split listings (resulting from division spinoffs) to counter the discount.

== History ==
During his tenure, President Yoon Suk Yeol promised to alleviate the Korea discount. However, his 2024 declaration of martial law was seen as exacerbating the factors related to the phenomenon.

In June 2025, during the tenure of President Lee Jae Myung, the National Assembly twice amended the Commercial Act, which regulates public companies, so that company managers now have fiduciary duty to shareholders rather than just the companies alone. This meant a change of power from the families that dominate companies towards minority investors. The law also mandates electronic shareholder meetings and changes voting procedures.
