= The Korea Transport Institute =

South Korean think tank

The Korea Transport Institute (KOTI) Republic of Korea
- 한국교통연구원

Agency overview
- Formed: 11 November 1985
- Preceding agency: 교통개발연구원 (Until 2005)
- Jurisdiction: Republic of Korea
- Headquarters: 370 Sicheong-daero, Sejong City, Korea
- Agency executive: Jaehak OH, President
- Website: English Site

Korean name
- Hangul: 한국교통연구원
- Hanja: 韓國交通硏究院
- RR: Hanguk gyotong yeonguwon
- MR: Han'guk kyot'ong yŏn'guwŏn

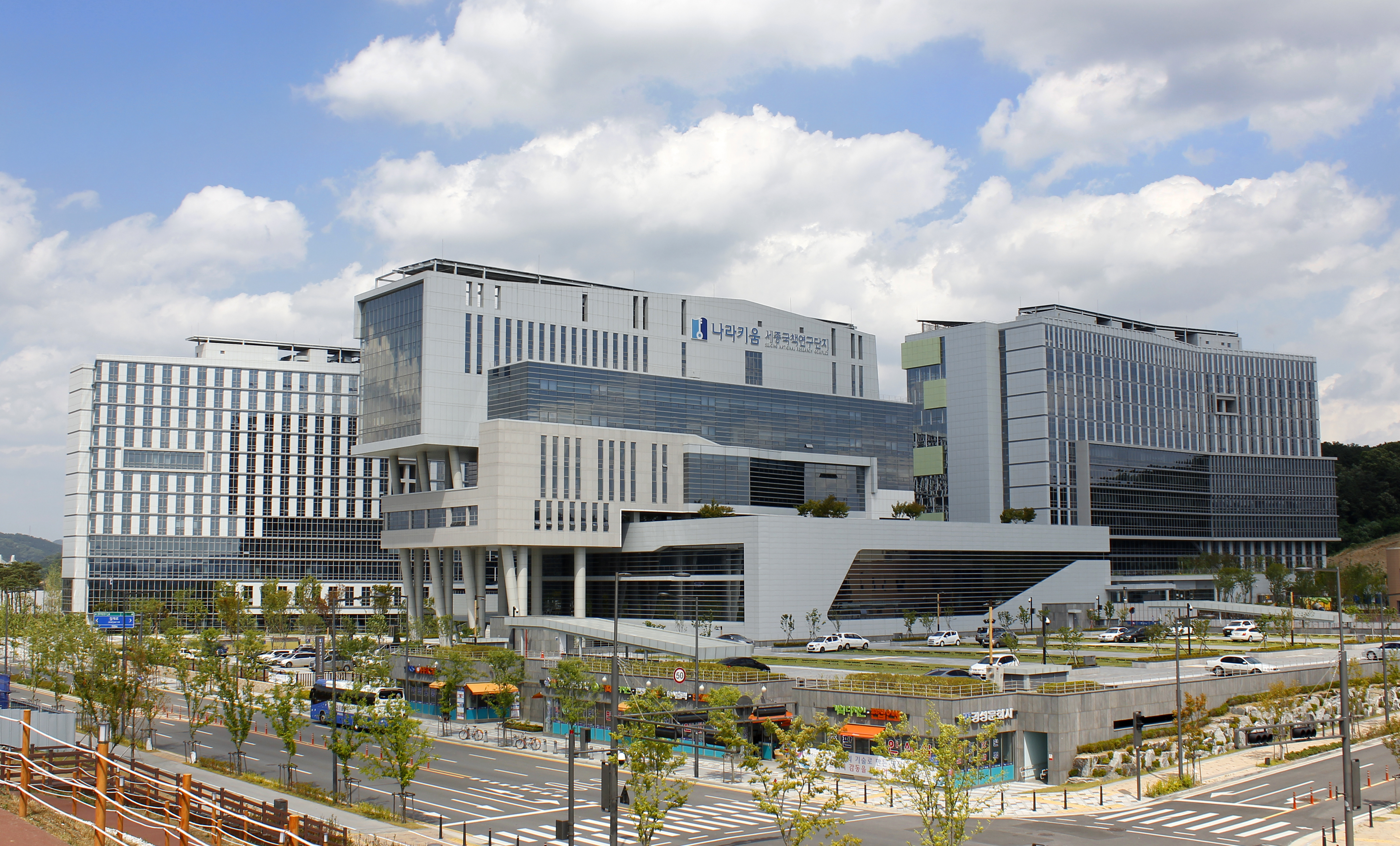
Sejong National Research Complex

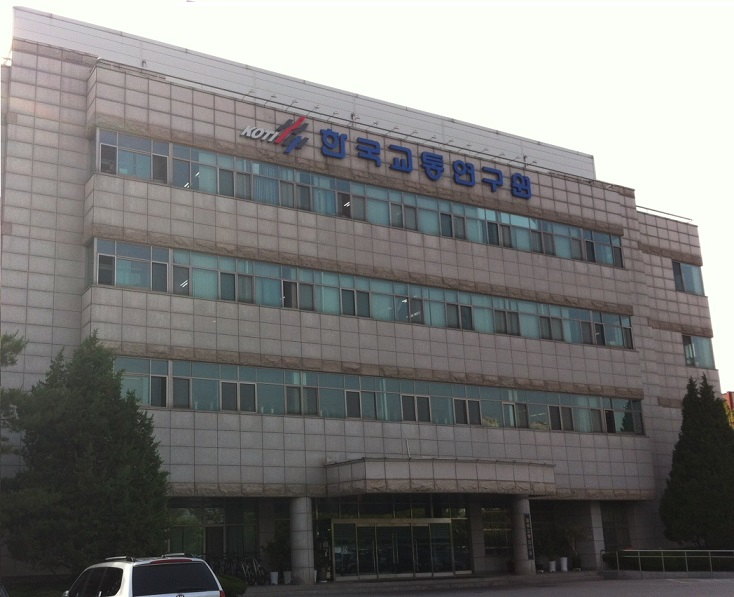
The main building in Goyang prior to the move to Sejong

The Korea Transport Institute (KOTI) is a think tank under the Prime Minister's Office in South Korea. Commissioned research is by order of the Ministry of Land, Infrastructure and Transport (MOLIT) and local government. It relocated to the Sejong National Research Complex in Sejong City in December 2014.

== History ==
KOTI was founded through Article 32 of the Civil Act in November 1985 and official began operation August 1987 under article 24 of the Urban Traffic Readjustment Promotion Act. In 1999 it joined the National Research Council for Economics, Humanities, and Social Sciences (NRCS) and moved to the Construction & Transport Research Complex in Goyang City until it moved to Sejong City in December 2014. As of December 2017, the current president is OH Jaehak and is the 14th president of KOTI. The position was previously held by LEE Chang Woon.

== Organization ==
KOTI consists of 300 personnel of which 230 are in research positions and a total of 99 are Ph.D. holders. Under the president are nine departments with 22 divisions. Researcher exchange programs exist with Organisation for Economic Co-operation and Development (OECD), Asian Development Bank (ADB), and the World Bank.

- Dept. of The Fourth Industrial Revolution & Transport
- Dept. of Comprehensive Transport
- Dept. of Road Transport
- Dept. of Rail Transport
- Dept. of Aviation
- Dept. of Logistics
- Dept. of National Transport Big Data
- Dept. of Global Transport Cooperation
- Dept. of Planning and Administration

== Publications ==
=== Korean Language ===
- Research Book Series - focuses on major transport issues in Korea, grouped by theme
- Research Reports - short-term research and analysis on transport issues and policy problem
- Commissioned Research Reports - as commissioned by the government and domestic/international research organizations
- Journal of Transport Research (교통연구) - quarterly academic journal with articles written by those in universities, research institutes, and businesses
- Transport (교통) - monthly publication focusing on current Korean and international transport policies and research
- KOTI Brief - biweekly research report newsletter
- KOTI Themed Briefs - briefs issued by specific research focuses within KOTI including KOTI KTDB, aviation policy, sustainable transport, logistics, bicycle, and Northeast Asia

=== English Language ===
- KOTI World Brief - monthly newsletter with selected articles translated from the KOTI Brief
- Toward an Integrated Green Transportation System in Korea - series which takes KOTI World Brief articles and collects them into themes
- KSP Series - book series focusing on Korea's major transport policies and technological developments
