= Mayor of Seongnam City =

Mayor of Seongnam, South Korea

Mayor of Seongnam
- 성남시장
- Incumbent; Shin Sang-jin since 1 July 2022
- Term length: 4 years
- Inaugural holder: Lee Jae-deok
- Formation: 1 July 1973
- Deputy: 1 Deputy Mayor
- Website: seongnam.go.kr

The Mayor of Seongnam is the head of the local government responsible for overseeing the administrative affairs of Seongnam City, Gyeonggi Province, South Korea.

== Appointed mayors (1973–1995) ==
The following is a list of appointed mayors of Seongnam, serving from July 1973 until June 1995.

No.	Name	Term	Notes
1	Lee Jae-deok	July 1, 1973 – November 12, 1974	Former head of the Seongnam Branch Office
2	Lee Nam-du	November 13, 1974 – July 25, 1976	
3	Hong Seok-pyo	July 26, 1976 – July 19, 1977	
4	Park Bong-hwi	July 20, 1977 – March 12, 1980	
5	Lee Bong-hak	March 13, 1980 – November 29, 1980	
6	Jeon Yeong-ho	November 30, 1980 – July 9, 1982	
7	Park Je-hyeok	July 10, 1982 – April 13, 1983	
8	Im Gyeong-ho	April 14, 1983 – July 7, 1985	
9	Kim Gak-hyeon	July 8, 1985 – December 23, 1986	
10	Lee Hae-jae	December 24, 1986 – December 31, 1988	
11	Kim Byeong-ryang	January 1, 1989 – December 26, 1989	
12	Oh Seong-su	December 27, 1989 – January 10, 1993	
13	Jeon Yeong-guk	January 11, 1993 – May 3, 1993	
14	Eom Seok-bong	May 3, 1993 – June 30, 1995	Last appointed mayor of Seongnam

== Directly elected mayors (1995–present) ==
The following is a list of directly elected mayors of Seongnam, beginning in July 1995.

No.	Name	Term	Party	Notes
15	Oh Seong-su	July 1, 1995 – June 30, 1998	Independent	1st elected term (former appointed mayor)
16	Kim Byeong-ryang	July 1, 1998 – June 30, 2002	Millennium Democratic Party (Note: The party affiliation shown reflects the party's name at the time.)	2nd elected term (former appointed mayor)
17	Lee Dae-yeop	July 1, 2002 – June 30, 2006	Grand National Party	3rd elected term
18	Lee Dae-yeop	July 1, 2006 – June 30, 2010	Grand National Party	4th elected term, re-elected
19	Lee Jae Myung	July 1, 2010 – June 30, 2014	Democratic Party	5th elected term
20	Lee Jae Myung	July 1, 2014 – March 15, 2018	Democratic Party	6th elected term, re-elected
Acting mayor		Lee Jae-cheol (Note: Acting mayor following Lee Jae-myung's resignation.)	March 15, 2018 – June 30, 2018	Deputy mayor
21	Eun Soo-mi	July 1, 2018 – June 30, 2022	Democratic Party	7th elected term
22	Shin Sang-jin	July 1, 2022 – June 30, 2026	People Power Party	8th elected term
23	Shin Sang-jin	July 1, 2026 –	People Power Party	9th elected term, re-elected

== Note ==
Lee Jae Myung (who served during the 5th and 6th popularly elected terms) was elected President of South Korea in the 2025 presidential election, setting a record as the first president to have previously served as the head of a popularly elected basic-level local government; he also became the second president, following former President Lee Myung-bak (who served as the popularly elected Mayor of Seoul during the 3rd term), and to have previously served as the head of a popularly elected metropolitan-level local government (as the popularly elected Governor of Gyeonggi Province during the 7th term).

== See also ==
- Governor of Gyeonggi Province
- Gyeonggi Province
