= Korea Labor Institute =

Policy/issues body

Korea Labour Institute (Korean: 한국노동연구원), or shortly KLI, is a governmental organisation that focuses about labour issues and policies. The organisation was inaugurated on 25 August 1988, and since 2014, it is located in Sejong City. The incumbent president is Bae Kyu-shik.
