= 2022 Sangdang by-election =

- 9 March 2022
Nominee	Chung Woo-taik	Kim Shi-jean	Ahn Chang-hyun
Party	People Power	Independent	Independent
Popular vote	67,033	38,637	9,952
Percentage	56.92%	32.81%	8.45%
Nominee	Park Jin-jae
Party	Independent
Popular vote	2,127
Percentage	1.80%
MP before election
Jeong Jeong-soon
Democratic
Elected MP
TBD

A by-election was held on 9 March 2022 for the National Assembly seat for Sangdang. It was called following the election annulment of the incumbent, Jeong Jeong-soon, on 1 September 2021. A part of the March 2022 by-elections, this by-election will be held together with the 2022 presidential election.

Jeong, who is a member of the ruling Democratic Party, was elected MP for Sangdang at the 2020 election, defeating Yoon Gap-geun from the United Future Party (UFP), Kim Hong-bae from the Minsaeng Party, Kim Jong-dae from the Justice Party, and Hong Kyung-hee from the National Revolutionary Dividends Party (NRDP).

Chung Woo-taik from the PPP had won the by-election by a landslide majority of 28,396 votes to return to be the MP for Sangdang again.

== Nomination ==
Lee Jang-sup, the MP for Seowon and the Democratic Party North Chungcheong chairman denied the party was considering put a direct candidate, as no one had intention for the election and Jeong Jeong-soon was still remaining as the Division Chief of the party despite his election result had already been void on 1 September 2021. Newspapers have mentioned the names of several potential candidates, including Lee Si-jong, the Governor of North Chungcheong, whose term is supposed to end by 30 June 2022 and is ineligible for seeking another term at the 2022 local elections. Nevertheless, on 25 January 2022, the Democratic Party made an announcement to not contest for the by-election in order to take a responsibility of provoking it.

In the People Power Party (PPP), the former North Chungcheong governor Chung Woo-taik was the leading candidate. He was also the former MP for Sangdang from 2012 to 2020, but was relocated to Heungdeok at the 2020 election, which he lost to the incumbent Do Jong-hwan. He announced to run for the by-election on 27 December 2021. Yoon Gap-geun, who contested at the 2020 election under the United Future Party (UFP) banner, was also considered potential candidate after he was acquitted of court cases on 15 December. Yoon also launched his bid to contest on 27 January 2022. Chung won PPP preselection on 10 February.

On 6 January 2022, the Justice Party announced the party will again back the former candidate Kim Jong-dae to contest again for Sangdang. This decision, however, provoked internal conflicts due to his competence. Chung Se-young, the former Justice Party North Chungcheong chairman, cited that Kim, who was under the party's North Chungcheong branch, left the party, but returned to Gyeonggi branch. Regarding Chung's claim, Kim revealed the reason, which is because of a broadcasting related to elections. On 17 January, Lee Yin-seon, the Justice Party North Chungcheong chairman, revealed that Kim declined to contest at the by-election, but would rather focus on the presidential election.

On 7 February, Kim Hyun-moon, the People Party North Chungcheong chairman, sent his intention to contest at this by-election to the central office. 2 days later, he, however, withdrew himself, citing "personal reasons". A day before, Ahn Chang-hyun, the former Seowon People Party chief, quit the party and announced he will contest as an independent candidate.

As no non-conservative parties put their respective candidates, it was expected that Chung might win uncontested. Nevertheless, on 14 February, Kim Shi-jean, the policy secretary to the Superintendent of Education of North Chungcheong Kim Byung-woo, announced her intention to run as an independent candidate, adding that she wants to bring changes to Sangdang. Park Jin-jae, an anti-immigration activist, is also contesting as an independent candidate.

== Controversies and issues ==
There were no debates for this by-election as Chung Woo-taik is the sole candidate qualifying for the debates. According to the law only member of a political party that has at least 5 MPs and/or, received at least 3% votes at the past elections qualify for the debates. Based on these regulations, only Chung is qualified. People's Solidarity for Participation and Citizens' Autonomy, a non-governmental organisation (NGO), urged the Sangdang National Election Commission (NEC) branch to hold debates to guarantee the "right to know".

Kim Shi-jean, an independent candidate, was criticised by netizens for using blue as a main colour, which is also the colour used by the Democratic Party that did not put forward a candidate. A photo was uploaded on her Facebook, which was taken along with the Democratic Party president Song Young-gil, also brought controversies. Park Jin-jae, another independent candidate, also criticised Kim for confusing the voters over using blue colour and not mentioning herself as an "independent".

== Results ==
2022 by-election: Sangdang
Party	Candidate	Votes	%	±%
People Power	Chung Woo-taik	67,033	56.92	+12.95
Independent	Kim Shi-jean	38,637	32.81	N/A
Independent	Ahn Chang-hyun	9,952	8.45	N/A
Independent	Park Jin-jae	2,127	1.80	N/A
Majority		28,396	24.11	N/A
Turnout		121,806	74.77	+9.88
People Power gain from Democratic		Swing	N/A	

== Previous result ==
2020 South Korean legislative election: Sangdang
Party	Candidate	Votes	%	±%
Democratic	Jeong Jeong-soon	45,707	47.09	−0.06
United Future	Yoon Gap-geun	42,682	43.97	−5.29
Justice	Kim Jong-dae	6,707	6.97	N/A
Minsaeng	Kim Hong-bae	1,278	1.31	N/A
National Revolutionary	Hong Kyung-hee	678	0.69	N/A
Majority		3,025	3.12	N/A
Turnout		98,093	64.89	+6.01
Democratic gain from United Future		Swing	+5.23	
