= Chung Woo-taik =

South Korean politician (born 1953)

Chung Woo-taik MP
- 정우택
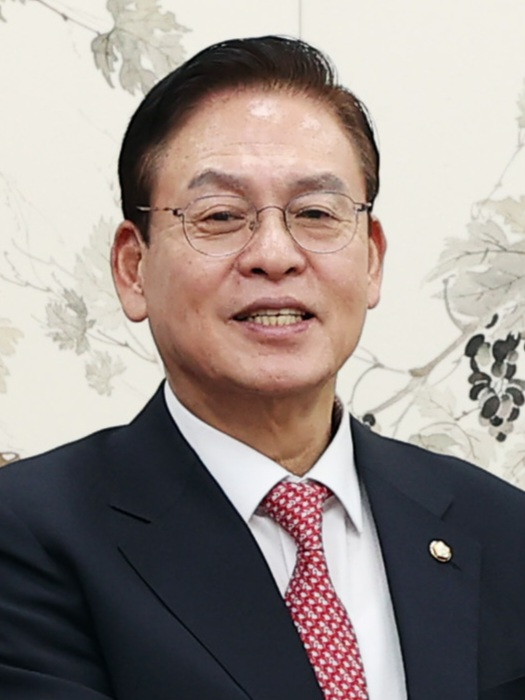

Deputy Speaker of the National Assembly
- In office 10 November 2022 – 29 May 2024 Serving with Kim Young-joo
- Preceded by: Chung Jin-suk
- Succeeded by: Joo Ho-young

Governor of North Chungcheong
- In office 1 July 2006 – 30 June 2010
- Preceded by: Lee Won-jong
- Succeeded by: Lee Si-jong

President of the Liberty Korea Party (Saenuri Party before 13 February 2017)
- Interim
- In office 1 April 2017 – 2 July 2017
- Preceded by: In Myung-jin (interim)
- Succeeded by: Hong Jun-pyo
- In office 16 December 2016 – 28 December 2018
- Preceded by: Lee Jung-hyun
- Succeeded by: In Myung-jin (interim)

Minister of Oceans and Fisheries
- In office 26 March 2001 – 6 September 2001
- President: Kim Dae-jung
- Prime Minister: Lee Han-dong
- Preceded by: Roh Moo-hyun
- Succeeded by: Yoo Sam-nam

Member of the National Assembly for Cheongju Sangdang (North Chungcheong)
- In office 10 March 2022 – 29 May 2024
- Preceded by: Jeong Jeong-soon
- Succeeded by: Lee Kang-ill
- In office 30 May 2012 – 29 May 2020
- Preceded by: Hong Jae-hyung
- Succeeded by: Jeong Jeong-soon

Member of the National Assembly for Jincheon–Goesan–Eumseong (North Chungcheong)
- In office 30 May 2000 – 29 May 2004
- Preceded by: Himself (as Jincheon-Eumseong, North Chungcheong); Kim Chong-hoh (Goesan, North Chungcheong)
- Succeeded by: Kim Jong-ryul (as Jeungpyeong–Jincheon–Goesan–Eumseong, North Chungcheong)

Member of the National Assembly for Jincheon–Eumseong (North Chungcheong)
- In office 30 May 1996 – 29 May 2000
- Preceded by: Min Tae-koo
- Succeeded by: Himself (as Jincheon–Goesan–Eumseong, North Chungcheong)

Personal details
- Born: 18 February 1953 (age 73) Yeonsan-dong, Busan, South Korea
- Citizenship: South Korean
- Party: People Power
- Other political affiliations: UNP (1992–1994); NDP (1994); Independent (1994–1995, 1995, 2004–2005); Democratic (1995); ULD (1995–2004); GNP (2005–2012); Saenuri (2012–2017); LKP (2017–2020); UFP (2020)
- Spouse: Lee Ok-bae
- Children: 2
- Parent(s): Chung Woon-gap (father); Park Deuk-ki (mother)
- Relatives: Chung Ji-taik (elder brother)
- Education: Sungkyunkwan University; Seoul National University; University of Hawaiʻi
- Occupation: Politician

Chung Woo-taik (Korean: 정우택, born 18 February 1953) is a South Korean politician who served as the former Governor of North Chungcheong from 2006 to 2010. He is currently the Member of the National Assembly for North Chungcheong Cheongju Sangdang since 2012~2020, 2022.

Chung is a notable Hoseo-based politician, although his actual birthplace is Busan. He was firstly elected MP in the 1996 election, and served as a 4-term MP from 1996 to 2004, and again from 2012 to 2020; both term in North Chungcheong. Once being a member of the now-defunct Alliance of Liberal Democrats (ALDE) that was a coalition partner to the National Congress for New Politics (NCNP) during the Kim Dae-jung government, he served as the Minister of Oceans and Fisheries from March to September 2001, which he resigned following the ALDE's departure from the government. He then joined to the Grand National Party (GNP) and ran for North Chungcheong governorship at the 2006 local elections and was elected, but failed to retain a second term.

He was the interim President of the Saenuri Party from 16 to 28 December 2016, and its successor, Liberty Korea Party (LKP), from 1 April to 2 July 2017.

== Early life and education ==
Chung Woo-taik was born in Yeonsan-dong, Busan, South Gyeongsang (now Yeonsan-dong, Yeonje, Busan) on 18 February 1953 amid the Korean War. He was the fourth son to 5 sons and 2 daughters of Park Deuk-ki and Chung Woon-gap, a veteran politician who served as the former Minister of Agriculture and Forestry and a 5-term MP. He attended Kyunggi High School and Sungkyunkwan University, where he graduated with a Bachelor of Laws degree. He studied together with a junior named Hwang Kyo-ahn, who later became the Prime Minister and the interim President.

== Political career ==
=== Early political career (1992–2001) ===
When the Chairman of Hyundai Group Chung Ju-yung founded the Unification National Party (UNP) in 1992, his son, Chung Mong-joon, who was also the then MP for Ulsan East, asked Chung Ji-taik to join politics. He refused it, but instead suggested his younger brother, Chung Woo-taik, to do so. He contested for Jincheon-Eumseong, where he was the UNP Division Chief, at the 1992 election. He quit the party after his defeat at the election.

He was firstly elected to the National Assembly at the 1996 election under the Alliance of Liberal Democrats (ALDE) ticket. The ALDE soon formed an alliance with National Congress for New Politics (NCNP) and nominated Kim Dae-jung as its candidate at the 1997 presidential election. After Kim was elected president, Chung became a member of the Commission on Presidential Transition, representing the ALDE.

=== Minister of Oceans and Fisheries (2001) ===
Following his re-election at the 2000 election, Chung was appointed Minister of Oceans and Fisheries in March 2001. He made total 48 site visits and organised a policy proposal titled "If I am the Minister?", where he accepted various ideas from the employees. Under his ministerial tenure, employees of the Ministry of Oceans and Fisheries took English examinations in order to enhance the quality. He resigned after ALDE withdrew from the cabinet in September 2001.

=== In opposition (2001–2005) ===
In 2004, the National Assembly voted for the impeachment of Roh Moo-hyun following his remarks that supporting the then de facto ruling Uri Party. Despite the strong boycott of the Uri Party, 193 MPs from the 3 oppositions (GNP, MDP and ALDE) voted in favour of the impeachment, and Chung was one of them (only Lee Nak-yon and Kim Chong-hoh voted against). The event, however, provoked a widespread anger among the people, which let the Uri Party to win the majority (152 out of 300 seats) at the 2004 election. The ALDE only secured 4 seats; Chung was also defeated by Kim Jong-ryul. Following the defeat, he withdrew from the ALDE on 28 May, just 2 days before the beginning of the 17th National Assembly.

=== Governor of North Chungcheong (2006–2010) ===
On 21 September 2005, Chung joined the Grand National Party (GNP). It was reported that he was preparing to run for North Chungcheong governorship at the 2006 local elections.

On 16 April 2006, Chung won GNP preselection, defeating Han Dae-soo and Kim Jin-ho. He was elected, achieving an overwhelming victory amid the high popularity of the party.

During his governorship, North Chungcheong attracted the highest manufacturing investment in South Korea, which is about 21,575,100,000,000 won (£13,345,028,604). Chungju, one of the main city of the province, successfully hosted the 2013 World Rowing Championships. He also organised the North Chungcheong Provincial Performing Arts Company, as well as corporate mecenat movements.

His tenure was, however, also faced public criticisms for budget wastes. Several projects i.e. China World, which was supposed to be built in Jecheon or Cheongwon, was cancelled. Cheongju International Airport aviation MRO project, which he promoted during his tenure, was ended up with permanent cancellation after Asiana Airlines officially abandoned it on 29 August 2016. The Democratic Party criticised him for being "hasty" about the project.

On 20 April 2010, Chung launched his bid for re-election at the 2010 election. Although he was leading at opinion polling, he finally lost to Lee Si-jong. His defeat was attributed to factors such as the amendment of Sejong by the Lee Myung-bak government.

=== Return to the National Assembly (2012–2016) ===
In the 2012 election, Chung contested as the Saenuri candidate for Sangdang and defeated Hong Jae-hyung, the then incumbent MP for the constituency and the Deputy Speaker of the National Assembly, making him to return as an MP after 2004. On 4 May, he made an announcement to run for the Saenuri leadership election on 15 May. He came to the 4th (11.5%) and lost to Hwang Woo-yea, but instead was elected one of the vice presidents.

=== Interim president of the Saenuri Party/Liberty Korea Party (2016–2017) ===
On 16 December 2016, shortly after the National Assembly voted in favour of the impeachment of Park Geun-hye, Chung was elected parliamentary leader of the Saenuri Party, defeating Na Kyung-won. As Lee Jung-hyun resigned as the President of the Saenuri Party on the same day, Chung also became the interim President, which he served until 28 December as he was replaced by In Myung-jin. During his interim presidency, 29 MPs including Kim Moo-sung and Yoo Seong-min left the party; they later formed the Bareun Party.

On 13 February 2017, the Saenuri Party changed its name to the Liberty Korea Party (LKP). On 10 March, the Constitutional Court upheld the impeachment in a unanimous 8–0 decision, which provoked the snap presidential election on 9 May. On 29 March, In announced he would step down by 31 March, the same date of the LKP presidential preselection where Hong Jun-pyo was elected LKP presidential candidate.

Chung returned as the interim President of the LKP and led the party at the presidential election on 9 May. Hong was defeated by Moon Jae-in, with only receiving 7,852,849 votes (24.03%). Chung's interim LKP presidency came to the end when Hong was elected president on 3 July.

=== Return to opposition (2017–present) ===
On 1 March 2020, the United Future Party (UFP) relocated Chung to Heungdeok for the 2020 election. He, however, lost to the former Minister of Culture, Sports and Tourism Do Jong-hwan.

On 27 December 2021, Chung announced he would contest at the 2022 Sangdang by-election, which was triggered following the election of Jeong Jeong-soon was declared void on 1 September. He won People Power Party (PPP) preselection, defeating Yoon Gap-geun. As the Democratic Party decided to not contest, Chung was expected to win uncontested, however, he faced a challenge from 3 independent candidates, including the Democrats-friendly Kim Shi-jean.

He made a successful return to the MP for Sangdang with about 56.9% of popular votes.

== Political views ==
A pro-Park Geun-hye figure, Chung was one of the 9 hardliner MPs revealed by the then Governor of Gyeonggi Nam Kyung-pil in 2016. In February 2017, he accused the 3 main opposition parties — Democratic Party, People's Party, and Justice Party, was threatening the Constitutional Court to uphold the impeachment.

He opposes the death penalty and same-sex marriage.

== Controversies ==
=== Parliamentary assault incident ===
On 19 September 1996, Chung provoked a controversy when he assaulted an NCNP MP Bang Yong-seok during a parliamentary session. During that time, Bang, who is 8 year older than Chung, was using informal language to Chung. Chung, however, could not handle his anger and smashed Bang's head for 3 times using a glass cup. Bang was severely injured and got an emergency treatment. Chung immediately apologised to Bang. People's Solidarity for Participatory Democracy (PSPD), a non-governmental organisation (NGO), condemned Chung and filed lawsuit against him 4 days later.

=== Remarks on Gyeongju earthquake ===
On 12 September 2016, Chung made a Facebook post, where he wrote that the 2016 Gyeongju earthquake was due to North Korean nuclear test 3 days ago. He also added that the nuclear test also increased the possibility of the eruption of Mount Baekdu. Several netizens criticised him for relating both cases. 6 days later, Koh Yoon-hwa, the Head of the Korea Meteorological Administration, mentioned that both incidents are not related each other.

=== Sleeping at Memorial Day ceremony ===
On 6 June 2017, Chung sparked another controversy when he was allegedly sleeping at the 62nd Memorial Day Ceremony. While the President Moon Jae-in was delivering a speech, Chung was recorded sleeping, compared to others who were listening his speech. He denied that he was sleeping, but adding that he was just listening with closing his two eyes.

== Personal life ==
Chung married Lee Ok-bae and has 2 sons.

He is a Protestant, although he grew up in a strict Confucianist family.

== Election results ==
=== General elections ===
Year	elections	Constituency	Political party	Votes (%)	Remarks
1992	14th National Assembly General Election	Jincheon–Eumseong (North Chungcheong)	UNP	17,597 (24.30%)	Defeated (2nd)
1996	15th National Assembly General Election	Jincheon–Eumseong (North Chungcheong)	ULD	33,771 (48.58%)	Won
2000	16th National Assembly General Election	Jincheon–Goesan–Eumseong (North Chungcheong)	ULD	36,505 (36.16%)	Won
2004	17th National Assembly General Election	Jeungpyeong–Jincheon–Goesan–Eumseong (North Chungcheong)	ULD	36,543 (40.77%)	Defeated (2nd)
2012	19th National Assembly General Election	Cheongju Sangdang (North Chungcheong)	Saenuri	55,141 (53.89%)	Won
2016	20th National Assembly General Election	Cheongju Sangdang (North Chungcheong)	Saenuri	40,307 (49.26%)	Won
2020	21st National Assembly General Election	Cheongju Heungdeok (North Chungcheong)	UFP	57,656 (42.95%)	Defeated (2nd)
2022	March 2022 By-election	Cheongju Sangdang (North Chungcheong)	PPP	67,033 (56.92%)	Won

=== Local elections ===
==== Governor of North Chungcheong ====
Year	Elections	Constituency	Political party	Votes (%)	Remarks
2006	4th Iocal Election	North Chungcheong (Governoral Elections)	GNP	361,157 (59.66%)	Won
2010	5th Iocal Election	North Chungcheong (Governoral Elections)	GNP	313,646 (45.91%)	Defeated (2nd)

Political offices
Preceded by Min Tae-koo	Member of the National Assembly for Jincheon-Eumseong; 1996–2000	Succeeded by Himself as Jincheon-Goesan-Eumseong
Preceded by Himself (as Jincheon-Eumseong); Kim Chong-hoh (Goesan)	Member of the National Assembly for Jincheon-Goesan-Eumseong; 2000–2004	Succeeded by Kim Jong-ryul (as Jeungpyeong-Jincheon-Goesan-Eumseong)
Preceded by Hong Jae-hyung	Member of the National Assembly for Sangdang; 2012–2020	Succeeded by Jeong Jeong-soon
Preceded by Roh Moo-hyun	Minister of Oceans and Fisheries; 2001	Succeeded by Yoo Sam-nam
Preceded by Lee Won-jong	Governor of North Chungcheong; 2006–2010	Succeeded by Lee Si-jong
Preceded by Lee Jung-hyun	President of the Saenuri Party (Interim); 2016	Succeeded by In Myung-jin (interim)
Preceded by In Myung-jin (interim)	President of the Liberty Korea Party (Interim); 2017	Succeeded by Hong Jun-pyo
