= Seosan–Yeongdeok Expressway =

Expressway in South Korea

Expressway No.30
- Seosan-Yeongdeok Expressway 서산영덕고속도로

Route information
- Length: 305.5 km (189.8 mi)
- Existed: 28 November 2007–present

Major junctions
- East end: Dangjin-dong, Dangjin, South Chungcheong Province
- West end: Yeongdeok-eup, Yeongdeok County, North Gyeongsang Province

Location
- Country: South Korea
- Major cities: Dangjin, Gongju, Sejong, Daejeon, Cheongju, Sangju, Andong

Highway system
- Highway systems of South Korea; Expressways; National; Local

- Seosan–Yeongdeok Expressway
- Hangul: 서산영덕고속도로
- Hanja: 瑞山盈德高速道路
- RR: Seosan Yeongdeok gosok doro
- MR: Sŏsan Yŏngdŏk kosok toro

Seosan–Yeongdeok Expressway (Korean: 서산영덕고속도로) also known as 6th East–West Expressway is an expressway in South Korea connecting Dangjin to Yeongdeok County.

Numbered 30, it means an East–West expressway. At 305.5 km, it is the fifth-longest expressway in South Korea. Two sections of the route, Dangjin-Daejeon Expressway and Cheongju-Yeongdeok Expressway is directly connected with Gyeongbu Expressway.

== History ==
- 28 November 2007: Cheongwon JC-Nakdong JC segment opens to traffic
- 27 August 2009 : Magoksa IC opened
- 18 December 2009 : Nakdong JC-Yeongdeok IC begins construction
- 23 December 2009 : N.Yuseong IC opened
- 28 June 2012 : Nakdong JC-Sangju JC begins construction
- 1 July 2012 : E.Gongju IC and N.Yuseong IC changed the name to E.Sejong IC and S.Sejong IC
- 1 December 2014 : Cheongwon JC changed to Cheongju JC, Cheongwon-Sangju Expressway changed to Cheongju-Sangju Expressway
- 23 December 2016 : Nakdong JC - Yeongdeok IC section was scheduled to open, but it was delayed to 00:00 on 26 December due to additional security problems. The postponement was announced during the opening ceremony on the 23rd
- 26 December 2016 : Nakdong JC - Yeongdeok IC segment opened to traffic

== Compositions ==
Lanes

- Dangjin JC ~ Hoedeok JC, Cheongju JC ~ Yeongdeok IC : 4 lanes
- Hoedeok JC ~ Cheongju JC (Gyeongbu Expressway overlap) : 8 lanes

Length

- 197.88 km

Speed limit

- Dangjin JC ~ Yuseong JC, Cheongju JC ~ Nakdong JC : 110 km/h
- Yuseong JC ~ Cheongju JC, Nakdong JC ~ Yeongdeok IC : 100 km/h

=== Tunnels ===
Dangjin ~ Daejeon section

Name	Location	Length	Completion year	Note
Daeheung Tunnel	Sonji-ri, Daeheung-myeon, Yesan County, South Chungcheong Province	556m	2009	Yeongdeok-bound
Daeheung Tunnel	Jigok-ri, Daeheung-myeon, Yesan County, South Chungcheong Province	562m	2009	Dangjin-bound
Chadong Tunnel	Chadong-ri, Sinyang-myeon, Yesan County, South Chungcheong Province	363m	2009	Yeongdeok-bound
Chadong Tunnel	Nokcheon-ri, Yugu-eup, Gongju, South Chungcheong Province	315m	2009	Dangjin-bound
Sinyeong Tunnel	Nokcheon-ri, Yugu-eup, Gongju, South Chungcheong Province	686m	2009	Yeongdeok-bound
Sinyeong Tunnel	Sinyeong-ri, Yugu-eup, Gongju, South Chungcheong Province	680m	2009	Dangjin-bound
Hwaheung Tunnel	Yugu-ri, Yugu-eup, Gongju, South Chungcheong Province	305m	2009	Yeongdeok-bound
Hwaheung Tunnel	Hwaheung-ri, Sinpung-myeon, Gongju, South Chungcheong Province	305m	2009	Dangjin-bound
Haewol Tunnel	Haewol-ri, Sagok-myeon, Gongju, South Chungcheong Province	492m	2009	Yeongdeok-bound
Haewol Tunnel	Hogye-ri, Sagok-myeon, Gongju, South Chungcheong Province	440m	2009	Dangjin-bound
Hogye Tunnel	Hogye-ri, Sagok-myeon, Gongju, South Chungcheong Province	562m	2009	Yeongdeok-bound
Hogye Tunnel	Hogye-ri, Sagok-myeon, Gongju, South Chungcheong Province	550m	2009	Dangjin-bound
Yuseong Tunnel	Banseok-dong, Yuseong District, Daejeon	315m	2009	Yeongdeok-bound
Yuseong Tunnel	Hagi-dong, Yuseong District, Daejeon	315m	2009	Dangjin-bound

Cheongju ~ Sangju section

Name	Location	Length	Completion year	Note
Munui 1 Tunnel	Nohyeon-ri, Munui-myeon, Sangdang District, Cheongju, North Chungcheong Province	536m	2007	Yeongdeok-bound
Munui 1 Tunnel	Magu-ri, Munui-myeon, Sangdang District, Cheongju, North Chungcheong Province	451m	2007	Dangjin-bound
Munui 2 Tunnel	Magu-ri, Munui-myeon, Sangdang District, Cheongju, North Chungcheong Province	220m	2007	Yeongdeok-bound
Munui 2 Tunnel	Magu-ri, Munui-myeon, Sangdang District, Cheongju, North Chungcheong Province	120m	2007	Dangjin-bound
Pibanryeong Tunnel	Magu-ri, Munui-myeon, Sangdang District, Cheongju, North Chungcheong Province	1,952m	2007	Yeongdeok-bound
Pibanryeong Tunnel	Magu-ri, Munui-myeon, Sangdang District, Cheongju, North Chungcheong Province	2,014m	2007	Dangjin-bound
Hoein Tunnel	Geoncheon-ri, Hoebuk-myeon, Boeun County, North Chungcheong Province	220m	2007	Yeongdeok-bound
Hoein Tunnel	Geoncheon-ri, Hoebuk-myeon, Boeun County, North Chungcheong Province	215m	2007	Dangjin-bound
Suriti Tunnel	Geoncheon-ri, Hoebuk-myeon, Boeun County, North Chungcheong Province	903m	2007	Yeongdeok-bound
Suriti Tunnel	Geoncheon-ri, Hoebuk-myeon, Boeun County, North Chungcheong Province	825m	2007	Dangjin-bound
Suhan Tunnel	Gyoam-ri, Suhan-myeon, Boeun County, North Chungcheong Province	214m	2007	
Tanbu Tunnel	Goseung-ri, Tanbu-myeon, Boeun County, North Chungcheong Province	220m	2007	
Hwaseo 1 Tunnel	Sinbong-ri, Hwaseo-myeon, Sangju, North Chungcheong Province	225m	2007	
Hwaseo 2 Tunnel	Sanggok-ri, Hwaseo-myeon, Sangju, North Chungcheong Province	128m	2007	
Naeseo 1 Tunnel	Gogok-ri, Naeseo-myeon, Sangju, North Chungcheong Province	131m	2007	
Naeseo 2 Tunnel	Gogok-ri, Naeseo-myeon, Sangju, North Chungcheong Province	470m	2007	Yeongdeok-bound
Naeseo 2 Tunnel	Gogok-ri, Naeseo-myeon, Sangju, North Chungcheong Province	418m	2007	Dangjin-bound
Naeseo 3 Tunnel	Neungam-ri, Naeseo-myeon, Sangju, North Chungcheong Province	500m	2007	Yeongdeok-bound
Naeseo 3 Tunnel	Neungam-ri, Naeseo-myeon, Sangju, North Chungcheong Province	520m	2007	Dangjin-bound
Naeseo 4 Tunnel	Neungam-ri, Naeseo-myeon, Sangju, North Chungcheong Province	1,335m	2007	Yeongdeok-bound
Naeseo 4 Tunnel	Neungam-ri, Naeseo-myeon, Sangju, North Chungcheong Province	1,370m	2007	Dangjin-bound

- Nakdong Tunnel
- Danmil 1 Tunnel
- Danmil 2 Tunnel
- Danmil 3 Tunnel
- Danmil 4 Tunnel
- Ansa 1 Tunnel
- Ansa 2 Tunnel
- Anpyeong 1 Tunnel
- Anpyeong 2 Tunnel
- Anpyeong 3 Tunnel
- Danchon 1 Tunnel
- Danchon 2 Tunnel
- Danchon 3 Tunnel
- Danchon 4 Tunnel
- Oksan Tunnel
- Gilan 1 Tunnel
- Gilan 2 Tunnel
- Gilan 3 Tunnel
- Gilan 4 Tunnel
- Sailsan Tunnel
- Pacheon 1 Tunnel
- Pacheon 2 Tunnel
- Pacheon 3 Tunnel
- Jinbo Tunnel
- Jipum 1 Tunnel
- Jipum 2 Tunnel
- Jipum 3 Tunnel
- Jipum 4 Tunnel
- Jipum 5 Tunnel
- Jipum 6 Tunnel
- Jipum 7 Tunnel
- Jipum 8 Tunnel
- Jipum 9 Tunnel
- Jipum 10 Tunnel
- Dalsan 1 Tunnel
- Dalsan 2 Tunnel
- Dalsan 3 Tunnel
- Yeongdeok Tunnel

=== Bridges ===
Dangjin-Cheongju section

- Sagiso Bridge
- Samung Bridge
- Seongha 2 Bridge
- Wondong 1 Bridge
- Wondong 2 Bridge
- Monggok Bridge
- Jagae 2 Bridge
- Godeok 2 Bridge
- Godeok 3 Bridge
- Daecheoncheon Bridge
- Seokgok 1 Bridge
- Yongri 1 Bridge
- Yongri 2 Bridge
- Sapgyocheon Bridge
- Hapo Bridge
- Buncheon 1 Bridge
- Buncheon 2 Bridge
- Buncheon 3 Bridge
- Jwabang 1 Bridge
- Jwabang 2 Bridge
- Sinseokyuk Bridge
- Wolgok Bridge
- Sinjang 1 Bridge
- Sinjang 2 Bridge
- Sinjang 3 Bridge
- Yesan Bridge
- Sonji Bridge
- Tanbang Bridge
- Seogyeyang Bridge
- Nokmun Bridge
- Sinyang 1 Bridge
- Sinyang 2 Bridge
- Daedeok Bridge
- Chadong 1 Bridge
- Chadong 2 Bridge
- Nokcheon 1 Bridge
- Nokcheon 2 Bridge
- Seungji Bridge
- Yugu 1 Bridge
- Yugu 2 Bridge
- Hwaheung 1 Bridge
- Hwaheung 2 Bridge
- Hwaheung 3 Bridge
- Haewol Bridge
- Haewol 1 Bridge
- Hogye Bridge
- Saedeul Bridge
- Hongcheon Bridge
- Dongdae Bridge
- Bangmun Bridge
- Sangseo Bridge
- Docheon 1 Bridge
- Docheon 2 Bridge
- Sinung Bridge
- Gwisan Bridge
- Jeongancheon Bridge
- Cheongryong 1 Bridge
- Cheongryong 2 Bridge
- Habong 2 Bridge
- Eunyong Bridge
- Sanak 3 Bridge
- Daegyocheon Bridge
- Songwon Bridge
- Geumgang Bridge (488m long)
- Yongsucheon Bridge
- Ansan 1 Bridge
- Ansan 2 Bridge
- Yuseong Bridge
- Hagi 1 Bridge
- Hagi 2 Bridge
- Hagi 3 Bridge
- Tandong Bridge
- Jangdong Bridge
- Seolmok Overpass
- Hwaam Bridge
- Gapcheon Bridge
- Sangseo 1 Bridge
- Seokbong Overpass
- Geumgang 1 Bridge
- Maebongcheol Overpass
- Maebong 1 Overpass
- Seondong Bridge
- Sidong Bridge
- Jukjeon Bridge
- Jukam Bridge
- Nami Bridge
- Nami Overpass

Cheongju-Yeongdeok section

- Cheoksan 2 Bridge
- Cheoksan 3 Bridge
- Cheogksan 4 Bridge
- Namgye 1 Bridge
- Namgye 2 Bridge
- Namgye 3 Bridge
- Gukjeon Bridge
- Samhang 1 Bridge
- Munui Bridge
- Nohyeon Bridge
- Yongchon Bridge
- Hoein Bridge
- Busu 1 Bridge
- Busu 2 Bridge
- Hoein Bridge (925m long)
- Geoncheon Bridge
- Suriti Bridge
- Chajeong Bridge
- Dongjeong Bridge
- Bocheong Bridge
- Gyoam 1 Bridge
- Gyoam 2 Bridge
- Seongri Bridge
- Sogye Bridge
- Geumgul Bridge
- Bocheongcheon Bridge
- Sangjang 1 Bridge
- Sangjang 2 Bridge
- Samgacheon Bridge
- Bongbi Bridge
- Bulmok 1 Bridge
- Sumun Bridge
- Galpyeong Bridge
- Gubyeongsan Bridge
- Pyeongon Bridge
- Sangreung Bridge
- Geumsan Bridge
- Dalcheon 1 Bridge
- Dalcheon 2 Bridge
- Dalcheon 3 Bridge
- Jisan 1 Bridge
- Jisan 2 Bridge
- Hwaseo Bridge
- Samgok Bridge
- Seowon 1 Bridge
- Seowon 2 Bridge
- Seowon 3 Bridge
- Seowon 4 Bridge
- Gogok 1 Bridge
- Gogok 2 Bridge
- Naeseo 1 Bridge
- Naeseo 2 Bridge
- Neungam Bridge
- Jisa Bridge
- Gajang Bridge
- Byeongseongcheon 1 Bridge
- Byeongseongcheon 2 Bridge
- Jicheon 2 Bridge
- Jicheon 3 Bridge
- Jicheon 4 Bridge
- Unpyeong 1 Bridge
- Unpyeong 2 Bridge
- Seoje Bridge
- Dodeok 1 Bridge
- Dodeok 2 Bridge
- Samchun 1 Bridge
- Jangrimcheon Bridge
- Gilancheon Bridge
- Mukgye 1 Bridge
- Yonggyecheon Bridge
- Yongjeoncheon Bridge
- Seosicheon Bridge
- Jipum 2 Bridge
- Osipcheon 1 Bridge
- Osipcheon 2 Bridge
- Yongdeokcheon Bridge
- Soseocheon Bridge
- Daeseocheon Bridge

== Major stopovers ==
South Chungcheong Province

- Dangjin (Sagiso-dong - Myeoncheon-myeon) - Yesan County (Bongsan-myeon - Godeok-myeon - Sapgyo-eup - Oga-myeon - Eungbong-myeon - Daeheung-myeon - Sanyang-myeon) - Gongju (Yugu-eup - Sinpung-myeon - Sagok-myeon - Useong-myeon - Wolmi-dong - Useong-myeon - Uidang-myeon)

Sejong

- Janggun-myeon - Yeongi-myeon

South Chungcheong Province

- Gongju Banpo-myeon

Sejong

- Geumnam-myeon

Daejeon

- Yuseong District (Ansan-dong - Oesam-dong - Banseok-dong - Oesam-dong - Hagi-dong - Jaun-dong - Jang-dong - Banghyeon-dong - Hwaam-dong - Gwanpyeong-dong - Yongsan-dong - Tamnip-dong - Jeonmin-dong) - Daedeok District (Sindae-dong - Wa-dong - Sangseo-dong - Deokam-dong - Moksang-dong - Seokbong-dong)

North Chungcheong Province

- Cheongju Seowon District (Hhyeondo-myeon - Nami-myeon) - Cheongju Sangdang District (Munui-myeon - Gadeok-myeon) - Boeun County (Hoein-myeon - Suhan-myeon - Boeun-eup - Tanbu-myeon - Jangan-myeon - Maro-myeon)

North Gyeongsang Province

- Sangju (Hwanam-myeon - Hwaseo-myeon - Naeseo-myeon - [[Oenam-myeon - Gaeun-dong - Gajang-dong - Yangchon-dong - Jicheon-dong - Odae-dong - Geodong-dong - Nakdong-myeon) - Uiseong County (Danmil-myeon - Danbuk-myeon - Angye-myeon - Ansa-myeon - Anpyeong-myeon) - Andong Iljik-myeon - Uiseong County (Danchon-myeon - Jeomgok-myeon - Oksan-myeon) - Andong]] Gilan-myeon - Cheongsong County (Pacheon-myeon - Jinbo-myeon) - Yeongdeok County (Jipum-myeon - Dalsan-myeon - Ganggu-myeon - Yeongdeok-eup)

== List of facilities ==
- IC: Interchange, JC: Junction, SA: Service Area, TG:Tollgate
  - Light purple(■): Honam Expressway overlap
  - Light green(■): Gyeongbu Expressway overlap
  - Light blue(■): Sangju-Yeongcheon Expressway overlap

No.	Name	Korean name	Distance		Connection	Location		Note
Seosan–Dangjin section is under construction
1	Dangjin JC	당진 분기점	-	25.80	Seohaean Expressway	South Chungcheong Province	Dangjin	
2	Myeoncheon IC	면천 나들목	4.04	29.84	Local Route 70 (Myeoncheon-ro); Ami-ro	South Chungcheong Province	Dangjin	
SA	(Myeoncheon SA)	(면천휴게소)				South Chungcheong Province	Dangjin	
3	Godeok IC	고덕 나들목	8.66	38.50	National Route 40 (Yedeok-ro)	South Chungcheong Province	Yesan County	
4	Yesan-Sudeoksa IC	예산수덕사 나들목	11.68	50.18	National Route 21 (Chungseo-ro)	South Chungcheong Province	Yesan County	
4-1	Yesan JC	예산 분기점			Iksan-Pyeongtaek Expressway	South Chungcheong Province	Yesan County	
SA	Yesan SA	예산휴게소				South Chungcheong Province	Yesan County	
5	Sinyang IC	신양 나들목	12.51	62.69	Local Route 70 (Cheongsin-ro)	South Chungcheong Province	Yesan County	
6	Yugu IC	유구 나들목	10.53	73.22	National Route 39 (Geumgyesan-ro)	South Chungcheong Province	Gongju	
SA	(Sinpung SA)	(신풍휴게소)				South Chungcheong Province	Gongju	
7	Magoksa IC	마곡사 나들목	9.14	82.36	National Route 32 (Chadong-ro)	South Chungcheong Province	Gongju	Dangjin-bound only
8	W.Gongju JC	서공주 분기점	3.79	86.15	Seocheon-Gongju Expressway	South Chungcheong Province	Gongju	
9	Gongju JC	공주 분기점	2.67	88.82	Nonsan-Cheonan Expressway	South Chungcheong Province	Gongju	
10	Gongju IC	공주 나들목	2.87	91.69	Nonsan-Cheonan Expressway; National Route 23 (Charyeong-ro); National Route 32 (Geumbyeong-ro); National Route 36 (Chadong-ro·Charyeong-ro); Baekjekeun-gil	South Chungcheong Province	Gongju	
SA	Gongju SA	공주휴게소				South Chungcheong Province	Gongju	
11	W. Sejong IC	서세종 나들목	7.00	98.65	National Route 36 (Janggi-ro)	Sejong		Former E.Gongju IC
12	S.Sejong IC	남세종 나들목	12.56	111.25	National Route 1 (Sejong-ro); Bukyuseong-daero	Sejong		Former N.Yuseong IC
13	Yuseong JC	유성 분기점	6.13	117.38	Honam Expressway Branch	Daejeon	Yuseong District	
	N.Daejeon IC	북대전 나들목	4.61	121.99	Local Route 32 (Daedeok-daero); Local Route 57 (Daedeok-daero)	Daejeon	Yuseong District	
	Hoedeok JC	회덕 분기점	3.61	125.60	Gyeongbu Expressway; Honam Expressway Branch	Daejeon	Daedeok District	
SA	Sintanjin SA	신탄진휴게소				Daejeon	Daedeok District	Yeongdeok-bound Only
	Sintanjin IC	신탄진 나들목	4.08	129.68	National Route 17 (Sintanjin-ro); Sintanjin-ro 681beon-gil	Daejeon	Daedeok District	
SA	Jugam SA	죽암휴게소				North Chungcheong Province	Cheongju	
	S.Cheongju IC	남청주 나들목	11.08	140.76	National Route 17 (Cheongnam-ro); Local Route 96 (Yeoncheong-ro·Cheongnam-ro)	North Chungcheong Province	Cheongju	Former Cheongwon IC
17	Cheongju JC	청주 분기점	3.50	144.26	Gyeongbu Expressway	North Chungcheong Province	Cheongju	Former Cheongwon IC
SA	Munui Cheongnamdae SA	문의청남대휴게소				North Chungcheong Province	Cheongju	
18	Munui Cheongnamdae IC	문의 나들목	8.10	152.36	Local Route 32 (Micheongoeun-ro)	North Chungcheong Province	Cheongju	
19	Hoein IC	회인 나들목	10.70	163.06	National Route 25 (Bocheong-daero)	North Chungcheong Province	Boeun County	
20	Boeun IC	보은 나들목	10.82	173.88	National Route 19 (Nambu-ro)	North Chungcheong Province	Boeun County	
21	Songnisan IC	속리산 나들목	5.98	179.86	National Route 25 (Bocheong-daero)	North Chungcheong Province	Boeun County	
21-1	Gubyeongsan IC	속리산 나들목	7.70	187.56	National Route 25 (Bocheong-daero)	North Chungcheong Province	Boeun County	Hi-pass exclusive interchange for Seosan-bound; access is via Seosan-bound only
SA	Songnisan SA	속리산휴게소				North Chungcheong Province	Boeun County	Dangjin-bound Only
SA	Hwaseo SA	화서휴게소				North Gyeongsang Province	Sangju	Yeongdeok-bound Only
22	Hwaseo IC	화서 나들목	16.23	196.09	National Route 25 (Yeongnamjeil-ro); Local Route 49 (Yeongnamjeil-ro)	North Gyeongsang Province	Sangju	
23	S.Sangju IC	남상주 나들목	18.95	215.04	National Route 3 (Gyeongsang-daero)	North Gyeongsang Province	Sangju	
24	Nakdong JC	낙동 분기점	8.64	223.68	Jungbu Naeryuk Expressway; Sangju-Yeongcheon Expressway	North Gyeongsang Province	Sangju	
25	Sangju JC	상주 분기점	3.83	227.51	Sangju-Yeongcheon Expressway	North Gyeongsang Province	Sangju	
26	E.Sangju IC	동상주 나들목	2.01	229.52	National Route 25 (Nakdong-daero); National Route 59 (Sangjudain-ro·Yeongnamjeil-ro)	North Gyeongsang Province	Sangju	
27	W.Uiseong IC	서의성 나들목	10.89	240.41	National Route 28 (Seobu-ro)	North Gyeongsang Province	Uiseong County	
SA	Uiseong SA	의성휴게소				North Gyeongsang Province	Uiseong County	
28	Andong JC	안동 분기점	20.02	260.43	Jungang Expressway	North Gyeongsang Province	Andong	
29	N.Uiseong IC	북의성 나들목	6.10	266.53	National Route 5 (Gyeongbuk-daero); Local Route 914 (Gyeongbuk-daero)	North Gyeongsang Province	Uiseong County	
SA	Jeomgok SA	점곡휴게소				North Gyeongsang Province	Uiseong County	Yeongdeok-bound Only
SA	Oksan SA	옥산휴게소				North Gyeongsang Province	Uiseong County	Dangjin-bound Only
30	E.Andong IC	동안동 나들목	19.16	285.69	National Route 35 (Chunghyo-ro)	North Gyeongsang Province	Andong	
SA	Cheongsong SA	청송휴게소				North Gyeongsang Province	Cheongsong County	
31	Cheongsong IC	청송 나들목	13.15	298.84	National Route 31 (Cheongsong-ro)	North Gyeongsang Province	Cheongsong County	
32	E.Cheongsong-Yeongyang IC	동청송영양 나들목	9.67	308.51	National Route 34 (Gyeongdong-ro)	North Gyeongsang Province	Cheongsong County	
33	Yeongdeok JC	영덕 분기점			Donghae Expressway	North Gyeongsang Province	Yeongdeok County	
TG	Yeongdeok TG	영덕 요금소				North Gyeongsang Province	Yeongdeok County	
34	Yeongdeok IC	영덕 나들목	26.90	335.41	National Route 7 (Donghae-daero)	North Gyeongsang Province	Yeongdeok County	

== See also ==
- Roads and expressways in South Korea
- Transportation in South Korea
