= Local Route 32 (South Korea) =

Road in South Korea

State-Funded Local Highway 32
- 국가지원지방도 제32호선
- Daejeon-Mungyeong Line 대전 ~ 문경선

Route information
- Length: 116.8 km (72.6 mi)
- Existed: 19 July 1996–present

Major junctions
- West end: Oncheon-dong, Yuseong District, Daejeon
- East end: Jeomchon-dong, Mungyeong, North Gyeongsang

Location
- Country: South Korea

Highway system
- Highway systems of South Korea; Expressways; National; Local

Local Route 32 Daejeon–Mungyeong Line (Korean: 국가지원지방도 제32호선 대전 ~ 문경선) is a local route of South Korea that connects Yuseong District, Daejeon to Mungyeong, North Gyeongsang.

== History ==
The route was originally planned in 1994 as an extension of National Route 32 from Daejeon to Jeomchon, but due to a lack of funding, the route was instead designated as a state-funded local route on 19 July 1996.

== Stopovers ==
Daejeon

- Yuseong-gu - Daedeok-gu

North Chungcheong Province

- Cheongju - Goesan County

North Gyeongsang Province

- Sangju

North Chungcheong Province

- Goesan County

North Gyeongsang Province

- Sangju - Mungyeong

== Major intersections ==
- (■): Motorway

IS: Intersection, IC: Interchange

=== Daejeon ===
Name	Hangul name	Connection	Location		Note
Guam Station IS	구암역삼거리	National Route 32 (Gyeryong-ro); Mannam-ro	Daejeon	Yuseong District	Terminus; National Route 32 overlap
Guam Bridge	구암교		Daejeon	Yuseong District	National Route 32 overlap
Guam Bridge IS	구암교네거리	National Route 32 (Hyeonchungwon-ro)	Daejeon	Yuseong District	National Route 32 overlap
Jangdae IS	장대네거리	Jangdae-ro	Daejeon	Yuseong District	
Gungdong IS	궁동네거리	Hanbat-daero	Daejeon	Yuseong District	
Gungdong Bridge Chungnam National University VHS Daejeon Nursing Home	궁동교 충남대학교 대전보훈요양원		Daejeon	Yuseong District	
Sinseong Bridge	신성교	Gajeong-ro; Noeun-ro	Daejeon	Yuseong District	
Jaundae IS	자운대네거리	Sinseongnam-ro; Jaun-ro	Daejeon	Yuseong District	
Sutgoldari	숯골다리		Daejeon	Yuseong District	
Chungnyeolsa IS	충렬사삼거리	Gajeongbuk-ro	Daejeon	Yuseong District	
Hwaam IS	화암네거리	Prefectural Route 57 (Daedeok-daero); Yuseong-daero	Daejeon	Yuseong District	Prefectural Route 57 overlap
Daejeon Electronic Design High School	대전전자디자인고등학교		Daejeon	Yuseong District	Prefectural Route 57 overlap
North Daejeon IC (North Daejeon IC IS)	북대전 나들목 (북대전IC네거리)	Dangjin-Yeongdeok Expressway; Honam Expressway; Daedeok-daero 989beon-gil	Daejeon	Yuseong District	Prefectural Route 57 overlap
No name	(이름 없음)	Baeul 1-ro	Daejeon	Yuseong District	Prefectural Route 57 overlap
Mirae-ro IS	미래로네거리	Oeryong-ro; Techno jungang-ro	Daejeon	Yuseong District	Prefectural Route 57 overlap
Korea Gas Technology Corporation	한국가스기술공사		Daejeon	Yuseong District	Prefectural Route 57 overlap
Singu Bridge IS	신구교네거리	Gapcheon-ro; Geumnamgujeuk-ro	Daejeon	Yuseong District	Prefectural Route 57 overlap
Singu Bridge	신구교		Daejeon	Yuseong District	Prefectural Route 57 overlap
Singu Bridge			Daejeon	Daedeok District	Prefectural Route 57 overlap
Daedeok Industrial Complex IS	대덕산단네거리	Munpyeongseo-ro; Sinilseo-ro	Daejeon	Daedeok District	
Daedeok Post Office IS	대덕우체국네거리	Munpyeongdong-ro; Sinildong-ro	Daejeon	Daedeok District	
Daedeok Police Station IS	대덕경찰서네거리	Daedeok-daero 1417beon-gil Sinildong-ro 33beon-gil	Daejeon	Daedeok District	
Hankook Daejeon Factory	한국타이어 대전공장		Daejeon	Daedeok District	
Seokbong IS	석봉네거리	Deogambuk-ro	Daejeon	Daedeok District	
Sintanjin Elementary School Saeyeoul Branch Sintanjin Underpass	신탄진초등학교 새여울분교 신탄진굴다리		Daejeon	Daedeok District	
Sintanjin IS	신탄진네거리	National Route 17 (Sintanjin-ro)	Daejeon	Daedeok District	
Sintanjin Yongjeong Elementary School	신탄진용정초등학교		Daejeon	Daedeok District	
West of Daecheong Bridge	대청대교 서단	Daecheong-ro	Daejeon	Daedeok District	
Daecheong Bridge	대청대교		Daejeon	Daedeok District	Continuation into North Chungcheong Province

=== North Chungcheong Province ===
Name	Hangul name	Connection	Location		Note
Daecheong Bridge	대청대교		Cheongju City	Seowon District Hyeondo-myeon	Daejeon - North Chungcheong Province border line
Nosan 1 IS	노산1 교차로	Nosan 2-gil	Cheongju City	Seowon District Hyeondo-myeon	
Nosan 1 Bridge	노산1교		Cheongju City	Seowon District Hyeondo-myeon	
Nosan 2 IS (Nosan 2 Bridge)	노산2 교차로 (노산2교)	Dalgyenosan-ro	Cheongju City	Seowon District Hyeondo-myeon	
(Eco-corridor)	(생태이동통로)		Cheongju City	Seowon District Hyeondo-myeon	50m long
Haseok 1 IS (Dalgye Bridge)	하석1 교차로 (달계교)	Dalgyehaseok-ro	Cheongju City	Seowon District Hyeondo-myeon	
Haseok Bridge	하석교		Cheongju City	Seowon District Hyeondo-myeon	
Haseok 2 IS	하석2 교차로	Haseok 1-gil Hyeondosidong-gil	Cheongju City	Seowon District Hyeondo-myeon	
Daecheong Tunnel	대청터널		Cheongju City	Seowon District Hyeondo-myeon	Right tunnel: Approximately 1,170m Left tunnel: Approximately 1,120m
Daecheong Tunnel			Cheongju City	Sangdang District Munui-myeon	Right tunnel: Approximately 1,170m Left tunnel: Approximately 1,120m
Pumgok 1 Bridge	품곡1교		Cheongju City	Sangdang District Munui-myeon	
Pumgok IS	품곡 교차로	Deogyunamgye-ro	Cheongju City	Sangdang District Munui-myeon	
Pumgok 2 Bridge Pumgok 3 Bridge	품곡2교 품곡3교		Cheongju City	Sangdang District Munui-myeon	
Munui Tunnel	문의터널		Cheongju City	Sangdang District Munui-myeon	Right tunnel: Approximately 510m Left tunnel: Approximately 495m
Munsan Bridge Dodang 1 Bridge Dodang 2 Bridge	문산교 도당1교 도당2교		Cheongju City	Sangdang District Munui-myeon	
Dodangsan IS	도당산 교차로	Daecheonghoban-ro; Munuisinae-ro	Cheongju City	Sangdang District Munui-myeon	
Munui 1 Bridge Munui 2 Bridge Micheon Bridge	문의1교 문의2교 미천교		Cheongju City	Sangdang District Munui-myeon	
Munui IS	문의사거리	Daecheonghoban-ro; Munuisinae-ro; Hoenammunui-ro	Cheongju City	Sangdang District Munui-myeon	Connected with Prefectural Route 509
Munui IC (Munui IC IS)	문의 나들목 (문의IC삼거리)	Dangjin-Yeongdeok Expressway	Cheongju City	Sangdang District Munui-myeon	
Namgye 2 IS	남계2삼거리	Namgye-gil	Cheongju City	Sangdang District Munui-myeon	
Namgye 1 IS	남계1사거리	Gukjeon-gil; Gukjeonsamhang-gil; Namgye 1-gil	Cheongju City	Sangdang District Munui-myeon	
Namgye 3 IS	남계3사거리	Namgye 3-gil	Cheongju City	Sangdang District Munui-myeon	
Hwadang IS	화당삼거리	Cheoksanhwadang-ro	Cheongju City	Sangdang District Namil-myeon	
Hwadang Bridge	화당교		Cheongju City	Sangdang District Namil-myeon	
Hwadang 2 IS	화당2삼거리	Hwadang-gil	Cheongju City	Sangdang District Namil-myeon	
Gasan IS	가산삼거리	Gasan-gil	Cheongju City	Sangdang District Namil-myeon	
Goeun Bridge	고은교		Cheongju City	Sangdang District Namil-myeon	
Goeun IS	고은사거리	National Route 25 (Danjae-ro); Goeundusan-ro	Cheongju City	Sangdang District Namil-myeon	National Route 25 overlap
Goeun IS	고은삼거리	Goeundusan-ro	Cheongju City	Sangdang District Namil-myeon	National Route 25 overlap
Dusan IS	두산삼거리	National Route 25 (Bocheong-daero)	Cheongju City	Sangdang District Namil-myeon	National Route 25 overlap
Eunhaeng IS	은행삼거리	Gyesaneunhaeng-ro	Cheongju City	Sangdang District Namil-myeon	
Eunhaeng Bridge	은행교		Cheongju City	Sangdang District Namil-myeon	
Munju Bridge	문주교		Cheongju City	Sangdang District Namil-myeon	
Munju Bridge			Cheongju City	Sangdang District Gadeok-myeon	
Munju IS	문주삼거리	Prefectural Route 509 (Inchasidong-ro)	Cheongju City	Sangdang District Gadeok-myeon	
Kadok Elementary School	가덕초등학교		Cheongju City	Sangdang District Gadeok-myeon	
Geumgeo 2-ri Entrance	금거2리입구	Geumgeo-gil	Cheongju City	Sangdang District Gadeok-myeon	
Geumgeo Bridge	금거교		Cheongju City	Sangdang District Gadeok-myeon	
Chujeong Bridge Gwanjeong Bridge	추정교 관정대교		Cheongju City	Sangdang District Namseong-myeon	
Gwanjeong IS	관정삼거리	Prefectural Route 512 (Sanseong-ro)	Cheongju City	Sangdang District Namseong-myeon	
Miwon Bridge	미원교		Cheongju City	Sangdang District Miwon-myeon	
Miwon IS	미원사거리	National Route 19 (Nambu-ro)	Cheongju City	Sangdang District Miwon-myeon	National Route 19 overlap
Miwon IS	미원삼거리	Miwonsinae 2-gil	Cheongju City	Sangdang District Miwon-myeon	National Route 19 overlap
Miwon-myeon Office	미원면사무소	Prefectural Route 511 (Miwonchojeong-ro)	Cheongju City	Sangdang District Miwon-myeon	National Route 19 overlap
Cheongwon Library Miwon Middle School Miwon Elementary School	청원도서관 미원중학교 미원초등학교		Cheongju City	Sangdang District Miwon-myeon	National Route 19 overlap
Gubang IS	구방삼거리	National Route 19 (Goesan-ro)	Cheongju City	Sangdang District Miwon-myeon	National Route 19 overlap
Cheongcheon Police Station	청천파출소	Cheongcheon 8-gil Cheongcheon 9-gil	Goesan County	Cheongcheon-myeon	
Cheongcheon-myeon Office Cheongcheon Bus Terminal	청천면사무소 청천버스터미널		Goesan County	Cheongcheon-myeon	
Cheongcheon IS	청천사거리	National Route 37 (Goesan-ro); Cheongcheon 2-gil	Goesan County	Cheongcheon-myeon	National Route 37 overlap
Geumpyeong IS	금평삼거리	National Route 37 (Geumpyeong-ro)	Goesan County	Cheongcheon-myeon	National Route 37 overlap
Geumpyeong Bridge Dowonso Bridge	금평교 도원소교		Goesan County	Cheongcheon-myeon	
Dowon IS	도원삼거리	Prefectural Route 533 (Dogyeong-ro)	Goesan County	Cheongcheon-myeon	
Dowon Bridge	도원교		Goesan County	Cheongcheon-myeon	
Dowon Bridge IS	도원교 교차로	Hupyeongdowon-ro	Goesan County	Cheongcheon-myeon	
Hwayang Youth Training Center 1st Hwayang Bridge	화양청소년수련원 화양제1교		Goesan County	Cheongcheon-myeon	
Hwayang-dong Entrance IS	화양동입구 교차로	Hwayangdong-gil	Goesan County	Cheongcheon-myeon	
Wontapjae	원탑재		Goesan County	Cheongcheon-myeon	Elevation 390m
Chungcheongbuk-do Nature Learning Center Songmyeon Bridge	충청북도자연학습원 송면교		Goesan County	Cheongcheon-myeon	
Songmyeon IS	송면삼거리	Prefectural Route 49 (Songmun-ro)	Goesan County	Cheongcheon-myeon	Prefectural Route 49 overlap
Songmyeon Intercity Bus Stop Songpyeong Bridge Ipyeong Public Bus Stop Songmyon Middle School	송면시외버스정류장 송평교 이평공동정류소 송면중학교		Goesan County	Cheongcheon-myeon	Prefectural Route 49 overlap Continuation into North Gyeongsang Province

=== North Gyeongsang Province ===
Name	Hangul name	Connection	Location		Note
Ipseok-ri Hwabuk Elementary School Ipseok Branch Ipseok Clinic	입석리 화북초등학교 입석분교 입석보건진료소		Sangju City	Hwabuk-myeon	Prefectural Route 49 overlap North Chungcheong Province - North Gyeongsang Province border line
No name	(이름 없음)	Prefectural Route 997 (Yonghwa-ro)	Sangju City	Hwabuk-myeon	Prefectural Route 49, 997 overlap
Jangam IS	장암 교차로	Munjangdae 2-gil	Sangju City	Hwabuk-myeon	Prefectural Route 49, 997 overlap
Hwabuk Elementary School Hwabuk-myeon Office	화북초등학교 화북면사무소		Sangju City	Hwabuk-myeon	Prefectural Route 49, 997 overlap
No name	(이름 없음)	Prefectural Route 49 (Munjang-ro)	Sangju City	Hwabuk-myeon	Prefectural Route 49, 997 overlap
Yongyu 3 Bridge	용유3교		Sangju City	Hwabuk-myeon	Prefectural Route 997 overlap
Byeongcheon Bridge	병천교		Sangju City	Hwabuk-myeon	Prefectural Route 997 overlap
Byeongcheon Bridge			Mungyeong City	Nongam-myeon	Prefectural Route 997 overlap
Ssangyong Tunnel	쌍용터널		Mungyeong City	Nongam-myeon	Prefectural Route 997 overlap Approximately 400m
STX Resort Naeseo 4 Bridge Naeseo 3 Bridge Naeseo 2 Bridge Naeseo 1 Bridge Nongam Elementary School Cheonghwa Branch	STX리조트 내서4교 내서3교 내서2교 내서1교 농암초등학교 청화분교		Mungyeong City	Nongam-myeon	Prefectural Route 997 overlap
No name	(이름 없음)	Prefectural Route 997 (Chilbong-ro)	Mungyeong City	Nongam-myeon	Prefectural Route 997 overlap
Nongam IS	농암사거리	Prefectural Route 901 (Eunseong-ro)	Mungyeong City	Nongam-myeon	Prefectural Route 901 overlap
Nongam Bridge	농암교		Mungyeong City	Nongam-myeon	Prefectural Route 901 overlap
Sahyeon 1 IS	사현1 교차로	Prefectural Route 901 (Usan-ro)	Mungyeong City	Nongam-myeon	Prefectural Route 901 overlap
Sahyeon 2 IS	사현2 교차로	Muungogae-gil	Mungyeong City	Nongam-myeon	
Sahyeon Bridge	사현교		Mungyeong City	Nongam-myeon	
Sahyeon Tunnel	사현터널		Mungyeong City	Nongam-myeon	Approximately 180m
Jidong IS	지동 교차로	Jidong-gil	Mungyeong City	Nongam-myeon	
Jidong Tunnel	지동터널		Mungyeong City	Nongam-myeon	Approximately 764m
Jidong Tunnel			Sangju City	Euncheok-myeon	Approximately 764m
Dugok 1 IS	두곡1 교차로	Muun 1-gil	Sangju City	Euncheok-myeon	
Dugok 2 IS	두곡2 교차로	Dugok 2-gil	Sangju City	Euncheok-myeon	
Dugok 3 IS	두곡3 교차로	Jakyak-ro	Sangju City	Euncheok-myeon	
Jangam 1 Bridge	장암1교		Sangju City	Euncheok-myeon	
Jangam 1 Bridge			Sangju City	Ian-myeon	
Mureung IS	무릉 교차로	Mureung 1-gil	Sangju City	Ian-myeon	
Gamam Bridge	감암교	Acheon 4-gil	Sangju City	Ian-myeon	
Acheon IS	아천 교차로	Sasil-ro; Acheon 2-gil	Sangju City	Ian-myeon	
Bigogae Geoncheon Bridge	비고개 건천교		Sangju City	Ian-myeon	
Ian IS	이안 교차로	Yangbeomanryong-gil; Jineomae-gil	Sangju City	Ian-myeon	
Gyochon IS	교촌 교차로	Gyochon-gil	Sangju City	Hamchang-eup	
Hamchang Silk Museum	함창명주박물관		Sangju City	Hamchang-eup	
Hamchang IS	함창 교차로	Guhyang-ro	Sangju City	Hamchang-eup	
Daejo IS	대조 교차로	National Route 3 (Mungyeong-daero)	Sangju City	Hamchang-eup	
No name	(이름 없음)	Maebong-ro; Danggyo 5-gil	Mungyeong City	Mojeon-dong	
Mungyeong City Hall	문경시청		Mungyeong City	Mojeon-dong	
Mojeon IS	모전오거리	Mojeon-ro; Jungang-ro; Sinheung-ro	Mungyeong City	Mojeon-dong	Terminus

== See also ==
- Roads and expressways in South Korea
- Transportation in South Korea
