= Kim Young-hwan =

South Korean politician (born 1955)

- 김영환
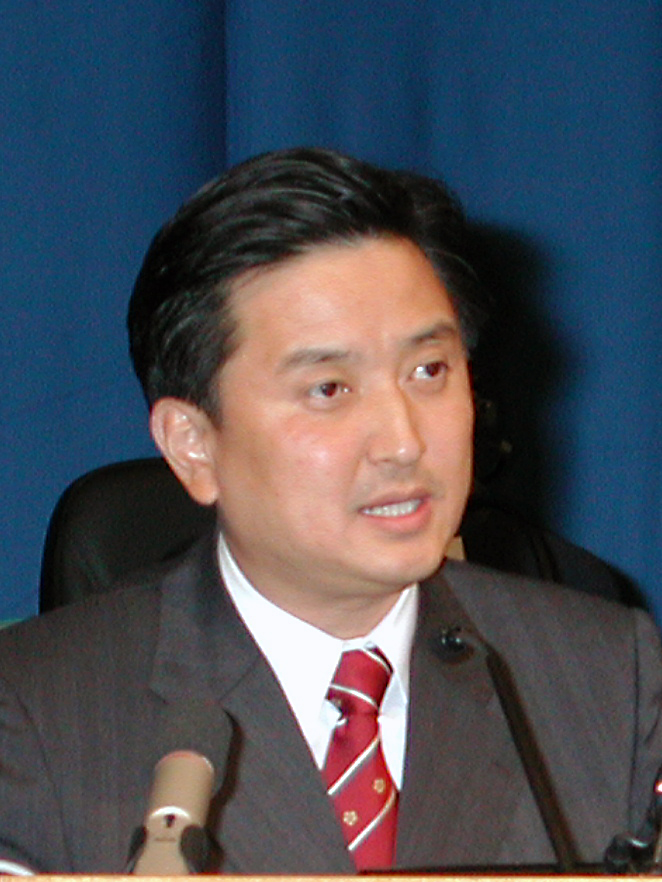

Governor of North Chungcheong
- In office 1 July 2022 – 30 June 2026
- Preceded by: Lee Si-jong
- Succeeded by: Shin Yong-han

Secretary-General of the People's Party
- In office 10 May 2016 – 10 November 2016
- President: Ahn Cheol-soo, Chun Jung-bae; Park Jie-won (acting)
- Preceded by: Park Sun-sook
- Succeeded by: Yu Sung-yup

Member of the National Assembly
- In office 29 October 2009 – 29 May 2016
- Preceded by: Hong Jang-pyo
- Succeeded by: Kim Cheol-min
- Constituency: Ansan Sangnok B (Gyeonggi)
- In office 30 May 1996 – 29 May 2004
- Preceded by: Chang Kyung-woo (Ansan–Ongjin, Gyeonggi)
- Succeeded by: Jang Gyung-soo (Ansan Sangnok A, Gyeonggi); Lim Jong-in (Ansan Sangnok B, Gyeonggi)
- Constituency: Ansan A (Gyeonggi)

Minister of Science and Technology
- In office 26 March 2001 – 28 January 2002
- President: Kim Dae-jung
- Prime Minister: Lee Han-dong
- Preceded by: Seo Jung-wook
- Succeeded by: Chae Young-bok

Personal details
- Born: 27 May 1955 (age 71) Cheongju, Sangdang, North Chungcheong, South Korea
- Party: People Power
- Other political affiliations: NCNP (1995–2000); MDP (2000–2005); Democratic (2005) (2005–2007); Democratic (2007) (2007–2008); Independent (2008–2009, 2015–2016, 2019–2020); Democratic (2008) (2009–2011); DUP (2011–2013); Democratic (2013) (2013–2014); NPAD (2014–2015); Democratic (2015) (2015–2016); People's (2016–2018); Bareunmirae (2018–2019); UFP (2020)
- Spouse: Chun Eun-joo
- Children: 1 son and 2 daughters
- Relatives: Yang Hyun-suk (relative)
- Education: Yonsei University
- Occupation: Activist, writer, dentist politician

Kim Young-hwan (Korean: 김영환, born 27 May 1955) is a South Korean activist, writer, dentist, and politician who served as the minister of science and technology from 2001 to 2002 under President Kim Dae-jung and as the governor of North Chungcheong Province from 2022 to 2026.

Botn in Cheongju, Kim was a member of the National Assembly in Ansan from 1996 to 2004 and 2009 to 2016. He stood for the Gyeonggi governorship in 2018 but lost.

== Early life and career ==
Kim was born in Cheongju, North Chungcheong Province, in 1955. After graduating from Cheongju High School in 1973, he studied dentistry at Yonsei University. In 1977, he was detained for 2 years due to leading a protest to abolish the Restoration Constitution. He was also involved in anti-dictatorship protests in 1980.

Kim also wrote several poems, including A Day of a Simple Assembler (단순 조립공의 하루) written under the pseudonym of Kim Hae-yoon (김해윤). Following his graduation in 1988, he opened a hospital.

== Political career ==
Kim Young-hwan was brought into the National Congress for New Politics in 1995 along with Kim Geun-tae, with whom he built a close relationship as a labourer. He ran in the 1996 election and was elected. Following his re-election in 2000, he was appointed the Minister of Science and Technology in 2001. By the time of his appointment, he was the youngest person serving the position.

In 2003, when the Millennium Democratic Party (MDP) was split after the dissidents formed the new party named Uri Party, Kim remained at the MDP. He failed to be re-elected in the 2004 election. Then, he returned as a dentist for a while. He launched a bid for Seoul mayorship in 2006, but his party chose Park Joo-sun instead. He harshly criticised the party's decision and warned he could leave the party.

Kim returned to the National Assembly following his election in the 2009 by-election. In 2012, he announced his bid to run as the President of the Republic but lost at the preselection.

In 2016, Kim joined the People's Party formed by Ahn Cheol-soo. He stood again as an MP candidate in the 2016 election but lost to Kim Cheol-min. Shortly after that, he was appointed the Secretary-General of his party. He resigned on 10 November due to the disagreement with the party's decision to join outdoor rallies against the President of the Republic, Park Geun-hye involved in a political scandal. In January 2017, he ran for the party presidency but lost to Park Jie-won; instead, he was elected as one of the Vice Presidents.

Prior to the local elections in 2018, Kim was selected as the Bareunmirae candidate for Gyeonggi governorship. He harshly condemned the Democratic candidate Lee Jae-myung for being connected to various controversies, but ended up with 4.8%, coming behind Lee Jae-myung and Nam Kyung-pil. He ran for the party presidency on 2 September but lost.

In February 2020, Kim joined the United Future Party and was elected as one of the vice presidents.

== Personal life ==
Kim married Chun Eun-joo in 1985, who is a cousin to Yang Hyun-suk, the former Chief Executive Officer of YG Entertainment. Both have a son and two daughters.

== Works ==
=== Poems ===
- "따라오라 시여" (시인사) (Come Here, Poet)
- "지난날의 꿈이 나를 밀어간다" (Dreams of Past Days Pushing Me, 1994)
- "꽃과 운명" (Flower and Destiny, 2000)
- "똥 먹는 아빠" (Poop-eating Dad, 1997)
- 방귀에 불이 붙을까요 김영환 아저씨의 재미있는 과학동시 (Is My Fart Flammable? Kim Young-hwan's Funny Science Poem, 2010)
- "불타는 바그다드의 어머니" (Mother of Burning Baghdad, 2003)
- "물왕리에서 우리가 마신 것은 사랑이었습니다" (What we drank at Mulwangni was love, 2003)
- "돌관자여 흐르는 강물에 갈퀴손을 씻으라" (O Stoner, Wash Your Rake Hands in the Flowing River, 2010)
- "눈부신 외로움" (Dazzling Loneliness, 2010)

=== Essays ===
- Love Song for You
- You Who Stood Alone Is Beautiful
- The First "Challenge!"
- 10 Thoughts Storage Saving The Country
- Ambiocularity CV

=== Critiques ===
- The Politics of Addition and Subtraction

== Election results ==
=== General elections ===
Year	Elections	Constituency	Political party	Votes (%)	Remarks
1996	15th National Assembly General Election	Ansan A (Gyeonggi)	NCNP	31,997 (34.44%)	Won
2000	16th National Assembly General Election	Ansan A (Gyeonggi)	MDP	48,206 (53.08%)	Won
2004	17th National Assembly General Election	Ansan Sangnok A (Gyeonggi)	MDP	18,631 (26.09%)	Defeated (2nd)
2008	18th National Assembly General Election	Ansan Sangnok A (Gyeonggi)	Independent	14,355 (23.92%)	Defeated (3rd)
2009	2009 By-election	Ansan Sangnok B (Gyeonggi)	Democratic	14,176 (41.17%)	Won
2012	19th National Assembly General Election	Ansan Sangnok B (Gyeonggi)	DUP	34,509 (59.58%)	Won
2016	20th National Assembly General Election	Ansan Sangnok B (Gyeonggi)	People's	23,837 (33.47%)	Defeated (2nd)
2020	21st National Assembly General Election	Goyang C (Gyeonggi)	UFP	65,981 (44.72%)	Defeated (2nd)

=== Local elections ===
==== Governor of Gyeonggi ====
Year	Elections	Constituency	Political party	Votes (%)	Remarks
2018	7th Iocal Election	Gyeonggi (Governoral Elections)	Bareunmirae	287,504 (4.81%)	Defeated (3rd)

==== Governor of North Chungcheong ====
Year	Elections	Constituency	Political party	Votes (%)	Remarks
2022	8th Iocal Election	North Chungcheong (Governoral Elections)	PPP	395,517 (58.19%)	Won
2026	9th Iocal Election	North Chungcheong (Governoral Elections)	PPP	371,067 (45.42%)	Defeated (2nd)
