= Ahn Nam-gi =

South Korean serial killer

- Born: July 1967 (age 59); Goesan County, South Korea
- Convictions: Murder x3 Rape x1
- Penalty: Death; commuted to life imprisonment

Details
- Victims: 3+
- Span of crimes: 2004–2010
- Country: South Korea
- State: North Chungcheong
- Date apprehended: 2010
- Imprisoned at: Chungju Prison

Ahn Nam-gi (Korean: 안남기; born July 1967) is a South Korean serial killer and rapist who was convicted of raping and killing at least three women in Cheongju from 2004 and 2010, while he worked as a taxi driver. Initially sentenced to death, his sentence was later commuted to life imprisonment, which he is currently serving at Chungju Prison.

== Early life and crimes ==
Ahn Nam-gi was born in July 1967 in Goesan County, South Korea, the only child of poor rural farmers. Unable to afford higher education, Ahn dropped out of high school and moved to Seoul to work in a factory. While living there, he married a local woman with whom he had three sons, and eventually switched professions to become a taxi driver.

On the early morning of August 23, 2000, Ahn attempted to rape a 19-year-old female passenger under the threat of a knife in Sangdang Park, but was prevented from doing and so arrested by police. He was then charged with rape, convicted and sentenced to a 3-year prison term. After being released from circa June 2003, he attempted to reconcile with his wife, but was rejected and left to live alone in Heungdeok-gu. As there was no laws preventing sex offenders from applying to be taxi drivers, he obtained a driver's license and continued with his profession.

== Murders ==
In October 2004, Ahn was driving around Cheongju when he came across 24-year-old Jo Cheon-byeon, an intellectually disabled runaway who had just arrived to the city via bus. After driving her around for some time, he eventually took her to his house, where he raped and strangled her to death. After keeping Mo's body in the house for two more days, Ahn wrapped up it up with blankets and twine and stuffed in the trunk of his taxi. He then drove to National Route 1 and dumped it there, where it was discovered on October 16. The authorities were unable to locate the culprit at the time, and the case went cold.

On the night of September 21, 2009, Ahn picked up a 41-year-old woman named Kim Mo at an intersection in Cheongju. When she fell asleep, he stopped the taxi in a sparsely populated area and raped her. After that, he drove to his house, where he tied Kim up and demanded that she give him her credit card information. After doing so, he taped Kim's mouth and stuffed her in the trunk of the taxi, where she eventually suffocated. On the following morning, Ahn went to a convenience store in Sangdang, where he withdrew 220,000 won from her bank account, before driving to the Jangpyeong Bridge, where he dumped Kim's body. Her body was found by a fisherman the day after, and authorities, having captured CCTV footage of Ahn withdrawing money using his victim's card, released images to the public in an attempt to identify the suspected killer.

In the early hours of January 20, 2010, Ahn kidnapped a 33-year-old female passenger from Heungdeok-gu and bound her with tape, but along the way, she began bleeding. She told him that she might be pregnant and begged him to drop her off at a gynecologist. To her surprise, Ahn removed the tape plastered over her eyes, dropped her off and then fled without harming her further. Two months later, on March 26, he kidnapped a 24-year-old woman named Song from Sangsang. Threatening her with a knife, he tied her up with string, stole her money and raped her. After doing so, he taped up her face with duct tape and locked her in the trunk of the taxi, while he went to a nearby ATM to withdraw some cash. However, he was given the wrong password, and when he returned to interrogate her, he found that Song had already suffocated. Apparently unconcerned, Ahn returned home to have a nap, and then for the next two days, went on with his job while keeping the woman's body in the trunk. Eventually, he abandoned it an empty parking lot near the Daedeok Industrial Complex in Daejeon, where it was found by an employee nine hours later.

== Investigation and arrest ==
Unbeknownst to Ahn, he had been caught on the building's cameras while dumping the body, and after analyzing the footage, police deduced that the killer was a taxi driver from Cheongju area who drove a Hyundai Sonata. As part of the investigation, they inspected all 67 vehicles registered in the city until they eventually reached Ahn, who was arrested 12 hours later. As a convicted felon, he was ordered to provide a DNA sample, which was then matched to the two previous unsolved cases, to which he confessed culpability.

== Trial, sentence and imprisonment ==
Prior to his trial, a mental evaluation determined that Ahn possessed several psychopathic traits, but it was clarified that he was not necessarily a psychopath. He himself claimed that never intended to kill his victims, as he even tore of pieces of the duct tape to let them breathe, but this claim was rejected by the courts due to the conflicting evidence presented. Ahn was found guilty and initially sentenced to death by the Daejeon District Court, but the verdict was later reduced to life imprisonment on appeal. He is currently imprisoned at the Chungju Prison, where is reportedly described as a model inmate.

Since his imprisonment, several media outlets and podcasts have suggested that Ahn might be responsible for more crimes, specifically committed during an unexplained lull in murders from 2004 to 2009. In recent years, he has been focused on as a suspect in the unsolved 2000 murder of a beauty guru in Cheongju, due to circumstantial evidence placing him near the crime scene and a personal letter which he sent to her sister, in which he requested that she "send a picture of the victim."

== See also ==
- List of serial killers by country
