= Noh Young-min =

South Korean politician

- 노영민

Chief of Staff to the President
- In office 9 January 2019 – 31 December 2020
- President: Moon Jae-in
- Preceded by: Im Jong-seok
- Succeeded by: Yoo Young-min

South Korean Ambassador to China
- In office 25 October 2017 – 8 January 2019
- President: Moon Jae-in
- Preceded by: Kim Jang-soo
- Succeeded by: Jang Ha-sung

Member of National Assembly
- In office 30 May 2004 – 29 May 2016
- Preceded by: Yoon Gyung-sik
- Succeeded by: Do Jong-hwan
- Constituency: Cheongju Heungdeok B (North Chungcheong)

Personal details
- Born: 25 November 1957 (age 68) Cheongju, South Korea
- Party: Democratic
- Education: Yonsei University

Noh Young-min (Korean: 노영민; Hanja: 盧英敏; born 25 November 1957) is a South Korean politician previously served as the Chief of Staff to the President Moon Jae-in and his first ambassador to China. He is a three-term parliamentarian of the ruling party, Democratic Party of Korea, and reportedly one of the closest confidants of Moon.

Noh was admitted to Yonsei University to study business management in 1976. In 1977 he was imprisoned for two years for being involved in a protest against authoritarian regime of Park Chung Hee and in 1978 further sentenced for continuing related endeavors while in jail. In 1979 he was pardoned and released from jail. However, he was placed on police's wanted list and expelled from the university in the following year due to his involvement in Gwangju Uprising. Before being re-admitted to the university, he worked as electric engineer and labour right activist. Noh graduated from the university in 1990.

While serving as a member of National Assembly, Noh took various high-level roles in his party and its preceding parties. He was also the chief of staff to Moon's first presidential campaign in 2012. After announcing that he won't run for re-election in 2016 general election, he helped Do Jong-hwan's campaign for his constituency's seat in parliament and later Moon's presidential campaign in 2017.

In February 2025, Noh was sentenced to a suspended prison term of six months by the Seoul Central District Court for abuse of power involving the forced repatriation of two North Korean fishermen who had killed 16 of their colleagues in the Sea of Japan in 2019.

== Electoral history ==
=== General elections ===
Election	Year	District	Party Affiliation	Votes	Percentage of votes	Results
16th National Assembly General Election	2000	Cheongju Heungdeok (North Chungcheong)	Millennium Democratic Party	24,966	25.75%	Lost (3rd)
17th National Assembly General Election	2004	Cheongju Heungdeok B (North Chungcheong)	Uri Party	36,604	52.45%	Won
18th National Assembly General Election	2008	Cheongju Heungdeok B (North Chungcheong)	United Democratic Party	22,175	37.46%	Won
19th National Assembly General Election	2012	Cheongju Heungdeok B (North Chungcheong)	Democratic United Party	41,606	52.96%	Won

=== Local elections ===
==== Governor of North Chungcheong ====
Elections	Year	Constituency	Political party	Votes (%)	Remarks
8th Iocal Election	2022	North Chungcheong (Governoral Elections)	Democratic Party	284,166 (41.80%)	Lost (2nd)
