= Shin Yong-han =

South Korean politician (born 1969)

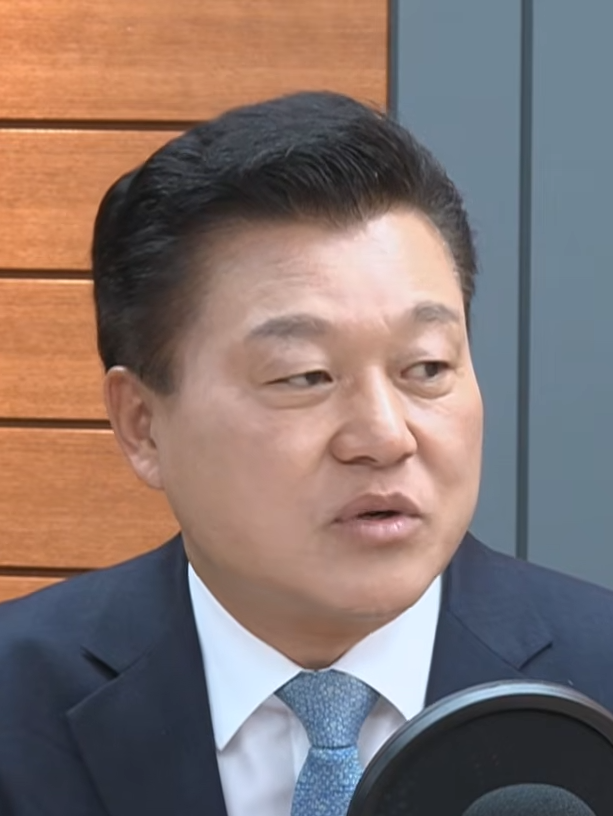
- Shin in 2026

Governor of North Chungcheong Province
- Incumbent
- Assumed office 1 July 2026
- Preceded by: Kim Young-hwan

Chairman of the Presidential Committee on Young Generation
- In office 7 October 2014 – 10 December 2015
- President: Park Geun-hye
- Prime Minister: Chung Hong-won; Lee Wan-koo; Choi Kyoung-hwan (acting); Hwang Kyo-ahn

Vice Chairman of the Presidential Committee for Decentralization and Balanced Development
- In office 29 September 2025 – 30 April 2026
- President: Lee Jae Myung
- Prime Minister: Kim Min-Seok
- Preceded by: Lee Jung-hyun
- Succeeded by: Song Soon-ho

Chairman of the Presidential Committee for Decentralization and Balanced Development
- Acting
- In office 5 March 2026 – 30 April 2026
- President: Lee Jae Myung
- Prime Minister: Kim Min-Seok
- Preceded by: Kim Kyoung-soo
- Succeeded by: Park Jung-hyun

Personal details
- Born: 2 May 1969 (age 57) Cheongju, Cheongwon, North Chungcheong, South Korea

Korean name
- Hangul: 신용한
- RR: Sin Yonghan
- MR: Sin Yonghan

Shin Yong-han (Korean: 신용한; born 2 May 1969) is a South Korean politician who has served as the governor of North Chungcheong Province since 2026. He is a member of the Democratic Party.

== Election results ==
=== Local elections ===
==== Governor of North Chungcheong ====
Year	Elections	Constituency	Political party	Votes (%)	Remarks
2018	7th Iocal Election	North Chungcheong (Governoral Elections)	Bareunmirae	70,330 (9.17%)	Defeated (3rd)
2026	9th Iocal Election	North Chungcheong (Governoral Elections)	Democratic	445,868 (54.57%)	Won
