= Lim Jong-in =

South Korean politician

- 임종인
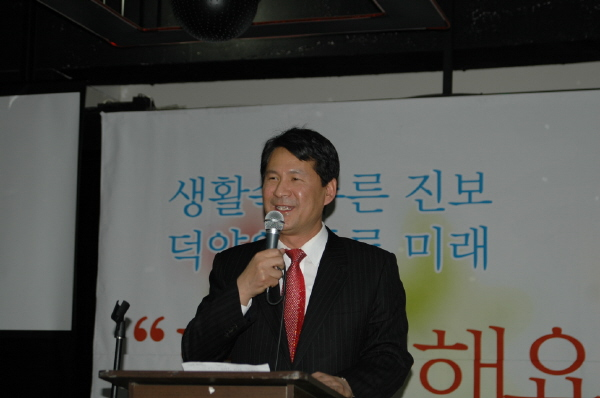
- Lim Jong-in

Member of the 17th National Assembly
- In office 30 May 2004 – 29 May 2008
- Preceded by: Kim Young-hwan (Ansan A, Gyeonggi)
- Succeeded by: Hong Jang-pyo
- Constituency: Ansan Sangnok B (Gyeonggi)

Personal details
- Born: August 28, 1956 (age 70) Gochang-eup, Gochang-gun, North Jeolla Province, South Korea
- Party: Independent
- Other political affiliations: Uri Party (until 2007)

- Lim Jong-in
- Hangul: 임종인
- Hanja: 林鐘仁
- RR: Im Jongin
- MR: Im Chongin

Lim Jong-In (Korean: 임종인; born August 28, 1956) is a politician and a lawyer. Lim was born in Gochang County, North Jeolla Province, South Korea. He received a bachelor's degree in law at Korea University.

Lim served 17th term of the South Korean National Assembly (2004–2008) as a member of Uri Party. He opposed the dispatch of South Korean troops at Iraq War, U.S-Korea FTA, and Uri Party's alliance with Grand National Party. Lim was the first member to quit Uri Party. In 2011, Lim joined Democratic Unity Party.

== Election results ==
Year	Elections	Constituency	Political party	Votes (%)	Results
1996	15th National Assembly General Election	Seongdong A (Seoul)	UDP	7,649 (9.23%)	Defeated
2004	17th National Assembly General Election	Ansan Sangnok B (Gyeonggi)	Uri	27,960 (47.90%)	Won
2008	18th National Assembly General Election	Ansan Sangnok B (Gyeonggi)	Independent	7,227 (15.54%)	Defeated
2009	2009 By-election	Ansan Sangnok B (Gyeonggi)	Independent	5,363 (15.57%)	Defeated

== See also ==
- Politics of South Korea
