= March 2022 South Korean by-elections =

The March 2022 South Korean by-elections was held on 9 March 2022, along with the 2022 presidential election. In this election, 5 MPs were elected, replacing their respective predecessors.

== Constituencies and reasons ==
Party	Incumbent	Constituency	Date	Reason
Democratic	Jeong Seong-soon	Sangdang	1 September 2021	Annulled
PPP	Yun Hee-suk	Seocho 1st	13 September 2021	Resigned
Democratic	Lee Nak-yon	Jongno	15 September 2021	Resigned
Democratic	Lee Kyu-min	Anseong	30 September 2021	Annulled
Independent	Kwak Sang-do	Daegu Central-South	11 November 2021	Resigned

== List of by-elections ==
- 2022 Anseong by-election
- 2022 Daegu Central-South by-election
- 2022 Jongno by-election
- 2022 Sangdang by-election
- 2022 Seocho 1st by-election
