= Hŭngsu Child =

Hominid skeleton discovered in Korea

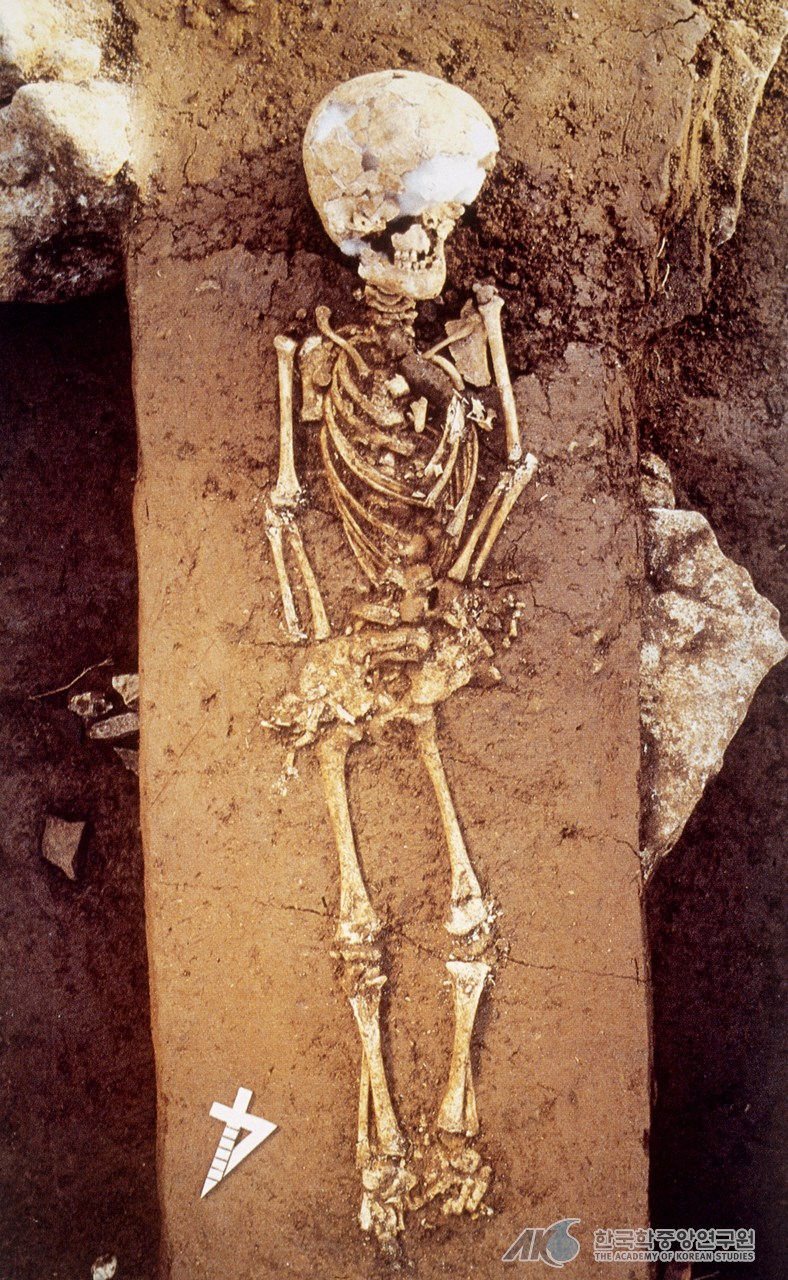
Hŭngsu Child

Hŭngsu (Korean: 흥수아이; lit. 'Hŭngsu child') is the name given to a skeleton which is believed to belong to the Paleolithic era and that was discovered in the Turubong limestone cave complex in Sangdang-gu, Cheongju by the excavation team of Chungbuk National University Museum (충북대학교 박물관) in 1982. The name Hŭngsu was originally assigned to both the cave and the archaeological remain by the government with the intent of rewarding the person who first discovered this skeleton: Kim Hŭngsu (김흥수). That was the first time in which a person's name was used to name a historical site.

== Discovery ==
In 1978, Kim Hŭngsu (김흥수) ran a limestone mine and found several animal bones and ivory that he sent to the neighboring Chungbuk National University (충북대학교). In 1983, while looking for limestone mines around Turubong cave in Cheongwon-gun (청원군), he discovered some hominid bones inside the cave that seemed to belong to two young children; one was missing its bones from the chest up, but the other skull—today known as Hŭngsu Child – was special because it was 60% intact. At discovery, the bones were lying on limestone rock and the back of the skull was protruded. Since then, a total of seven caves, one rock shelter, and one open site have yielded hominid fossils from the Korean peninsula.

The Korean peninsula is characterized by acidic soil which can easily dissolve remains., so discovery of remains like this was unexpected. The discovery of hominid fossils in Korea shows that there was a continuation of the Upper Paleolithic culture during the late Pleistocene period. Although late Pleistocene hominin fossil records of China and Japan are relatively well known, the record of the Korean Peninsula is poorly understood outside of Korea. Because the peopling of the Japanese archipelago was likely by some type of watercraft, the Korean Peninsula is the easternmost part of the Eurasian landmass reached by terrestrially restricted hominins through the middle of the late Pleistocene. Furthermore, the Korean Peninsula was never cut off from the continent as the Japanese archipelago was during almost all periods, except extreme glaciations. Thus, it is quite possible that hominins (presumably H. Erectus) who reached China during the early and/or Middle Pleistocene could have reached the Korean Peninsula as well. Research on the Korean Pleistocene was initiated in the early 1960s. Since that time thirteen caves and fifteen open-air sites on the Korean Peninsula have been in the process of being excavated. Among these, six cave sites and one rock shelter have yielded hominid fossils. Presently, only preliminary reports on these hominid remains have been published as part of excavation reports. The Turubong Cave Complex is one of the most important archaeological/paleontological sites of the Middle/Upper Pleistocene age in South Korea. The cave complex was formed in a Paleocene limestone basement during the Lower Pleistocene. The area has been mined for limestone since the 1930s, resulting in the destruction of many of the interwoven cave channels. In the Turubong complex, the Hŭngsu cave is of the greatest importance.

== Characteristics ==
The child was found outlying in a perfectly arranged position: a large flat limestone rock lied underneath 10 centimeters of fine soil, over which the child was placed, with his skull sticking out.

The stature of the skeleton is about 110 to 120 cm. Roentgenographic analysis, calcification pattern, and dental eruption revealed that at the time of their death, the child was probably from 4 to 6 years old. They died before their permanent teeth came out. The gender was indistinguishable. The estimated cranial capacity is from 1,260cc to 1,300cc. Sun-joo Park (박선주) and Yung-jo Lee (이영조) compared these measurements to the range of growth samples of Lowe Museum of Anthropology in Berkeley and noticed slight differences. Comparisons of the Hŭngsu skeleton are mainly based on a series of Indigenous North American children’s skeletons (2–5 year, using metrics of 101 individuals ranging in age 2 to 5 years of age. (Comparison made under the assumption of the Bering Strait Land Bridge Theory.) The La Quina Neanderthal child’s skull and prehistoric human skull including the modern man in East Asia are also used for comparison. The comparison of the Hŭngsu child’s skull and mandible with the normal range of growth of the Lowe's child’s sample shows them similar in many aspects. The Hŭngsu individual is only differentiated by the superiority in size of the skull, cranial length, and height, and, most significantly, its greater parietal arc. Robustness of the mandible and massive condylar process are also striking characteristics. These features are regarded as primitive. When the parietal arc of the Hŭngsu skull is compared with that of the La Quina Neanderthal child and that of the Yokpo child, the Hŭngsu one is significantly longer than the latter, and its arc is almost the same as Tha Tof Mandal adult skull. Some retardation in the growth of long bones is suggested; alternatively, such short stature could have been one of the main physical characteristics of the Upper Pleistocene hominid stock in Korea.

In the exact place in which Hŭngsu Child was discovered, experts have found stone artifacts and some traces of pollen and flowers, probably chrysanthemum. Moreover, the skeleton was originally covered in soil. This could be evidence to demonstrate that funerary rites were practiced already in the Paleolithic era or even the existence of a pseudo-religion. This is interesting because the funerary rites appear in a structured form during the reign of Koguryŏ (고구려), at the end of the Neolithic period.

== Dating ==
It is generally thought that Hŭngsu Child is an archeological find belonging to the Pleistocene age. Since some traces of fauna have been found, the exact period would probably be around the warm stage of the Upper Pleistocene. Given the physical features, the skull can be regarded as the first Homo Sapiens in Korea. If this is true, this means that 40,000 years B.C. the peninsula was already populated by people whose features were probably an evolution of the original African strain.

== Controversies ==
The problem with the findings from Hŭngsu Cave is that, before a multidisciplinary analytical research program had been set up to study the child’s bones and the site’s context, they were almost immediately presented to the public as representing the “oldest” (purportedly c. 40,000 years old) child burial of its kind in the world. Numerous archaeologists (who were not part of the Hŭngsu Cave excavation) have questioned the purported c. 40,000-year-old date for the child burial due to unclear stratigraphic context and necessity for closer evaluation of the child’s bones. Given this evidence (or lack thereof), it has long been speculated that the Hŭngsu burial might be of much more recent origin.

As stated in a study by S.-J Park, J.-Y Kim, Y.-J Lee, and J.–Y Woo, recently no radiocarbon age was obtained successfully. Today not only do the bones lack datable collagen but they are contaminated by the polyvinyl acetate preservative poured over the bone surface since 1982. However, Dr. Amélie Vialet, Maître de conférences at the Muséum National d'Histoire Naturelle, through accelerator mass spectrometry analysis obtained a radiocarbon age which was quite controversial: the archeological find was traced back in AD 1630–1893, a much later period compared the Pleistocene era.

Although the Korean research team who found the Hŭngsu child dismissed the more recent data by arguing that it was most likely due to contamination of the sample, there is little reason not to believe the radiocarbon date, particularly because it is based on a sample taken directly from the skeleton. Thus, before this type of potentially important information is disseminated to the public, it is best that a site and associated materials be subjected to thorough scientific scrutiny from multiple angles.

== See also ==
- List of unsolved deaths
