= Lee Si-jong =

South Korean politician (born 1947)

- 이시종
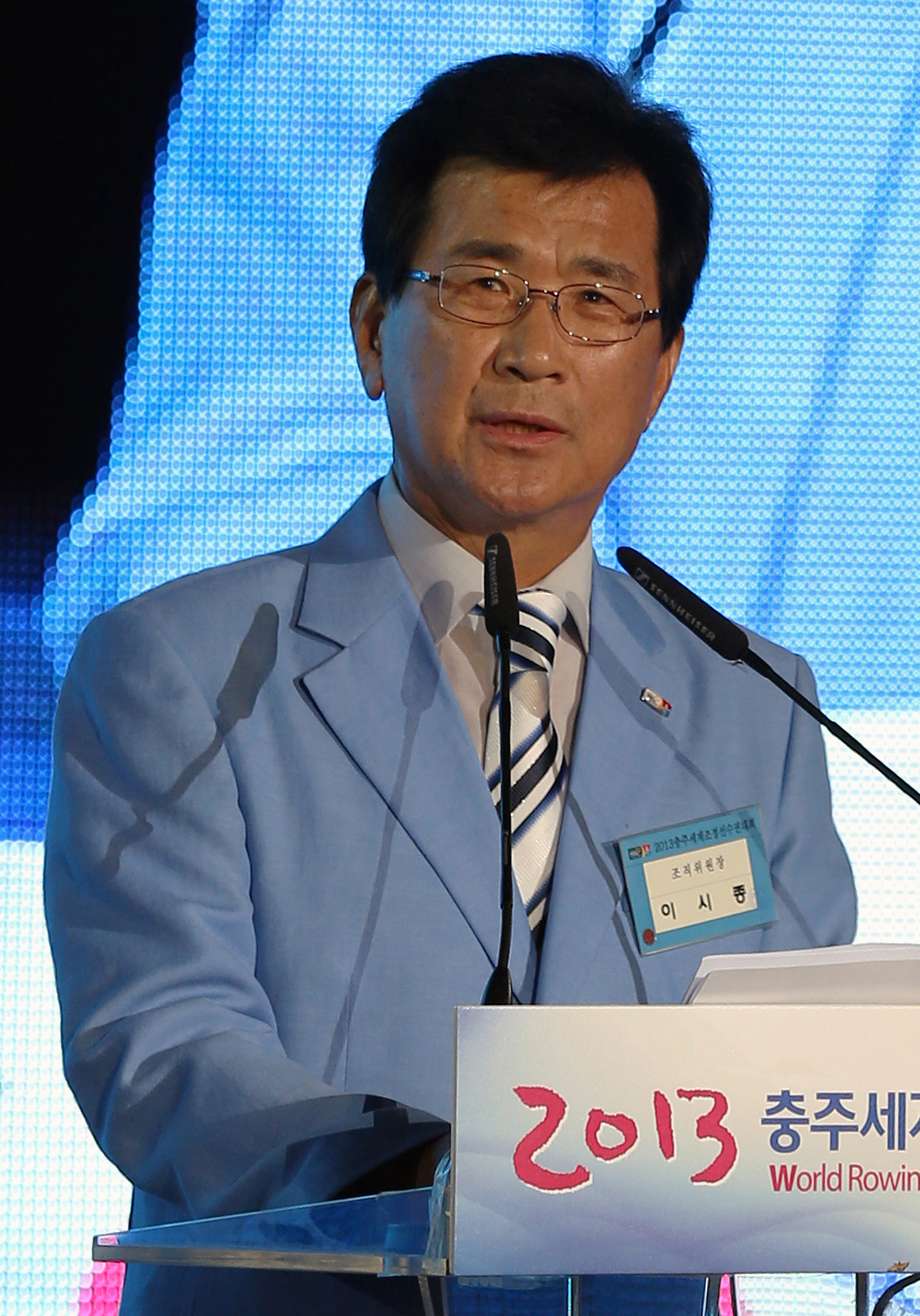

Governor of North Chungcheong
- In office 1 July 2010 – 30 June 2022
- Preceded by: Chung Woo-taik
- Succeeded by: Kim Young-hwan

Member of the National Assembly
- In office 30 May 2004 – 12 April 2010
- Preceded by: Lee Won-sung
- Succeeded by: Yoon Jin-shik
- Constituency: Chungju (North Chungcheong)

Mayor of Chungju
- In office 1 July 1995 – 17 December 2003
- Preceded by: Lee Seok-ui
- Succeeded by: Han Chang-hee
- In office 1 January 1989 – 9 January 1991
- Preceded by: Oh Byeong-ha
- Succeeded by: Oh Byeong-ha

Mayor of Yeongwol County
- In office 6 July 1981 – 22 January 1982
- Preceded by: Lee Gil-won
- Succeeded by: Kim Ui-hwan

Personal details
- Born: 18 April 1947 (age 79) Chungju, North Chungcheong Province, southern Korea
- Party: Democratic
- Education: Seoul National University
- Website: Lee Si-jong's Facebook

Korean name
- Hangul: 이시종
- Hanja: 李始鍾
- RR: I Sijong
- MR: I Sijong

Lee Si-jong (Korean: 이시종; born 18 April 1947) is a South Korean public servant and politician. He was the governor of North Chungcheong Province from 2010 to 2022.

== Election results ==
=== General elections ===
Year	Elections	Constituency	Political party	Votes (%)	Results
2004	17th National Assembly General Election	Chungju (North Chungcheong)	Uri	46,155 (51.59%)	Won
2008	18th National Assembly General Election	Chungju (North Chungcheong)	UDP	39,147 (48.04%)	Won

=== Local elections ===
==== Governor of North Chungcheong ====
Year	Elections	Constituency	Political party	Votes (%)	Remarks
2010	5th Iocal Election	North Chungcheong (Governoral Elections)	Democratic	349,913 (51.22%)	Won
2014	6th Iocal Election	North Chungcheong (Governoral Elections)	NPAD	361,115 (49.75%)	Won
2018	7th Iocal Election	North Chungcheong (Governoral Elections)	Democratic	468,750 (61.15%)	Won

==== Mayor of North Chungcheong Chungju ====
Year	Elections	Constituency	Political party	Votes (%)	Remarks
1995	1st Iocal Election	Mayor of North Chungcheong Chungju	DLP	42,514 (42.05%)	Won
1998	2nd Iocal Election	Mayor of North Chungcheong Chungju	Independent	55,599 (62.15%)	Won
2002	3rd Iocal Election	Mayor of North Chungcheong Chungju	GNP	46,811 (56.67%)	Won
