= Governor of North Chungcheong Province =

- 충청북도지사
- Seal of North Chungcheong

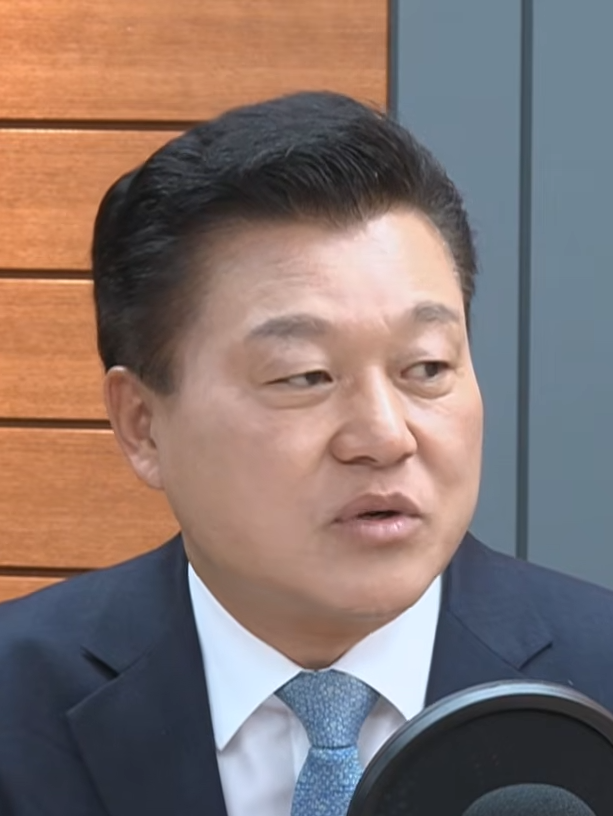
- Incumbent; Shin Yong-han since 1 July 2026
- Term length: Four years
- Inaugural holder: Yoon Ha-young
- Formation: 15 February 1946; 80 years ago

The Governor of North Chungcheong Province (Korean: 충청북도지사; Hanja: 忠淸北道知事) is the head of the local government of North Chungcheong Province who is elected to a four-year term.

== List of governors ==
=== Appointed governors (before 1995) ===
From 1946 to 1995, the Governor of North Chungcheong Province was appointed by the President of the Republic of Korea.

=== Directly elected governors (1995–present) ===
Since 1995, under provisions of the revised Local Government Act, the Governor of North Chungcheong Province is elected by direct election.

Political parties
Conservative
Liberal

Term	Portrait	Name (Birth–Death)	Term of office			Political party	Elected
Term	Portrait	Name (Birth–Death)	Took office	Left office	Time in office	Political party	Elected
1st		Ju Byeong-deok 주병덕 朱炳德 (1936–2020)	1 July 1995	30 June 1998	3 years, 0 days	United Liberal Democrats → Grand National	1995
2nd		Lee Won-jong 이원종 李元鐘 (born 1942)	1 July 1998	30 June 2006	8 years, 0 days	United Liberal Democrats → Grand National	1998
3rd		Lee Won-jong 이원종 李元鐘 (born 1942)	1 July 1998	30 June 2006	8 years, 0 days	United Liberal Democrats → Grand National	2002
4th		Chung Woo-taik 정우택 鄭宇澤 (born 1953)	1 July 2006	30 June 2010	4 years, 0 days	Grand National	2006
5th		Lee Si-jong 이시종 李始鍾 (born 1947)	1 July 2010	30 June 2022	12 years, 0 days	Democratic ('08) → Democratic United → Democratic ('11) → NPAD → Democratic ('14)	2010
6th		Lee Si-jong 이시종 李始鍾 (born 1947)	1 July 2010	30 June 2022	12 years, 0 days	Democratic ('08) → Democratic United → Democratic ('11) → NPAD → Democratic ('14)	2014
7th		Lee Si-jong 이시종 李始鍾 (born 1947)	1 July 2010	30 June 2022	12 years, 0 days	Democratic ('08) → Democratic United → Democratic ('11) → NPAD → Democratic ('14)	2018
8th		Kim Young-hwan 김영환 金榮煥 (born 1955)	1 July 2022	30 June 2026	4 years, 0 days	People Power	2022
9th		Shin Yong-han 신용한 申龍漢 (born 1969)	1 July 2026	Incumbent	69 days	Democratic	2026

== Elections ==
=== 1995 ===
1995 North Chungcheong gubernatorial election
Party	#	Candidate	Votes	Percentage
United Liberal Democrats	3	Ju Byeong-deok	250,105	36.43%
Democratic	2	Lee Yong-hee	168,209	24.50%
Democratic Liberal	1	Kim Deok-young	159,911	23.29%
Independent	6	Cho Nam-sung	54,748	7.97%
Independent	5	Yoon Suk-jo	27,880	4.06%
Independent	4	Yang Sung-youn	25,603	3.72%
Total			686,456	100.00%
Voter turnout			72.67%	

=== 1998 ===
1998 North Chungcheong gubernatorial election
Party	#	Candidate	Votes	Percentage
United Liberal Democrats	3	Lee Won-jong	451,533	74.14%
Grand National	1	Ju Byeong-deok	157,459	25.85%
Total			608,992	100.00%
Voter turnout			60.91%	

=== 2002 ===
2002 North Chungcheong gubernatorial election
Party	#	Candidate	Votes	Percentage
Grand National	1	Lee Won-jong	343,546	58.59%
United Liberal Democrats	3	Koo Chun-suh	196,253	33.47%
Independent	4	Chang Han-ryang	46,459	7.92%
Total			586,258	100.00%
Voter turnout			55.79%	

=== 2006 ===
2006 North Chungcheong gubernatorial election
Party	#	Candidate	Votes	Percentage
Grand National	2	Chung Woo-taik	361,157	59.66%
Uri	1	Han Beom-deok	185,426	30.63%
Democratic Labor	4	Bae Chang-ho	39,095	6.45%
People First	5	Cho Byung-se	19,646	3.24%
Total			605,324	100.00%
Voter turnout			54.70%	

=== 2010 ===
2010 North Chungcheong gubernatorial election
Party	#	Candidate	Votes	Percentage
Democratic	2	Lee Si-jong	349,913	51.22%
Grand National	1	Chung Woo-taik	313,646	45.91%
New Progressive	7	Kim Baek-kyu	19,551	2.86%
Total			683,110	100.00%
Voter turnout			58.83%	

=== 2014 ===
2014 North Chungcheong gubernatorial election
Party	#	Candidate	Votes	Percentage
NPAD	2	Lee Si-jong	361,115	49.75%
Saenuri	1	Yoon Jin-sik	346,152	47.68%
Unified Progressive	3	Shin Jang-ho	18,590	2.56%
Total			725,857	100.00%
Voter turnout			58.76%	

=== 2018 ===
2018 North Chungcheong gubernatorial election
Party	#	Candidate	Votes	Percentage
Democratic	1	Lee Si-jong	468,750	61.15%
Liberty Korea	2	Park Kyung-guk	227,371	29.66%
Bareunmirae	3	Shin Yong-han	70,330	9.17%
Total			766,451	100.00%
Voter turnout			59.35%	

=== 2022 ===
2022 North Chungcheong gubernatorial election
Party	#	Candidate	Votes	Percentage
People Power	2	Kim Young-hwan	395,517	58.19%
Democratic	1	Noh Young-min	284,166	41.80%
Total			679,683	100.00%
Voter turnout			49.82%	

=== 2026 ===
Candidate	Party	Votes	%
Shin Yong-han	Democratic Party	445,868	54.58
Kim Young-hwan (incumbent)	People Power Party	371,067	45.42
Total		816,935	100.00
Valid votes		816,935	98.10
Invalid/blank votes		15,786	1.90
Total votes		832,721	100.00
Registered voters/turnout		1,396,588	59.63
Democratic gain from People Power			

== See also ==
- Government of South Korea
- Politics of South Korea
