= Do Jong-hwan =

Korean poet and politician

- 도종환
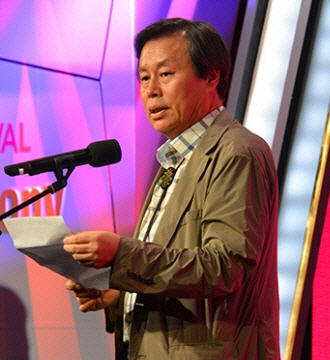

Leader of the Democratic Party
- Interim
- In office 8 April 2021 – 16 April 2021
- Preceded by: Kim Tae-nyeon (acting)
- Succeeded by: Yun Ho-jung (acting)

Minister of Culture, Sports and Tourism
- In office 16 June 2017 – 2 April 2019
- Prime Minister: Lee Nak-yeon
- Preceded by: Cho Yoon-sun
- Succeeded by: Park Yang-woo

Member of the National Assembly
- In office 30 May 2016 – 29 May 2024
- Preceded by: Noh Young-min
- Succeeded by: Lee Yeon-hee
- Constituency: Cheongju Heungdeok (North Chungcheong)
- In office 30 May 2012 – 29 May 2016
- Constituency: Proportional representation

Personal details
- Born: 27 September 1955 (age 70) Cheongju, North Chungcheong, South Korea
- Party: Democratic
- Religion: Roman Catholic (Christian name : Yoo Jin-ghil Augustine)

Korean name
- Hangul: 도종환
- Hanja: 都鐘煥
- RR: Do Jonghwan
- MR: To Chonghwan

Do Jong-hwan (Korean: 도종환; born 27 September 1955) is a South Korean poet and politician. He is a member of the South Korean National Assembly and former Minister of Culture, Sports and Tourism. He was also the interim leader of the Democratic Party from 8 to 16 April 2021.

== Life ==
Do Jong-hwan was born in Cheongju, South Korea. He received his undergraduate and graduate education at Chungbuk National University, graduating in 1982 with a Master's in Korean Language and Literature. He became a school teacher and was a part-time poet until his wife died just two years after their marriage. This trauma resulted in his writing You, my hollyhock, a collection of love poems which brought him critical acclaim. After his wife's death, Do endeavored to embrace his life more fully. With the goal of improving educational standards, he served as the regional director for his teachers' union, and was also active as a regional leader for an organization promoting democracy. Though he lost his job as a teacher and was even jailed for his activities, he continued to fight for justice and better future for the Korean people.

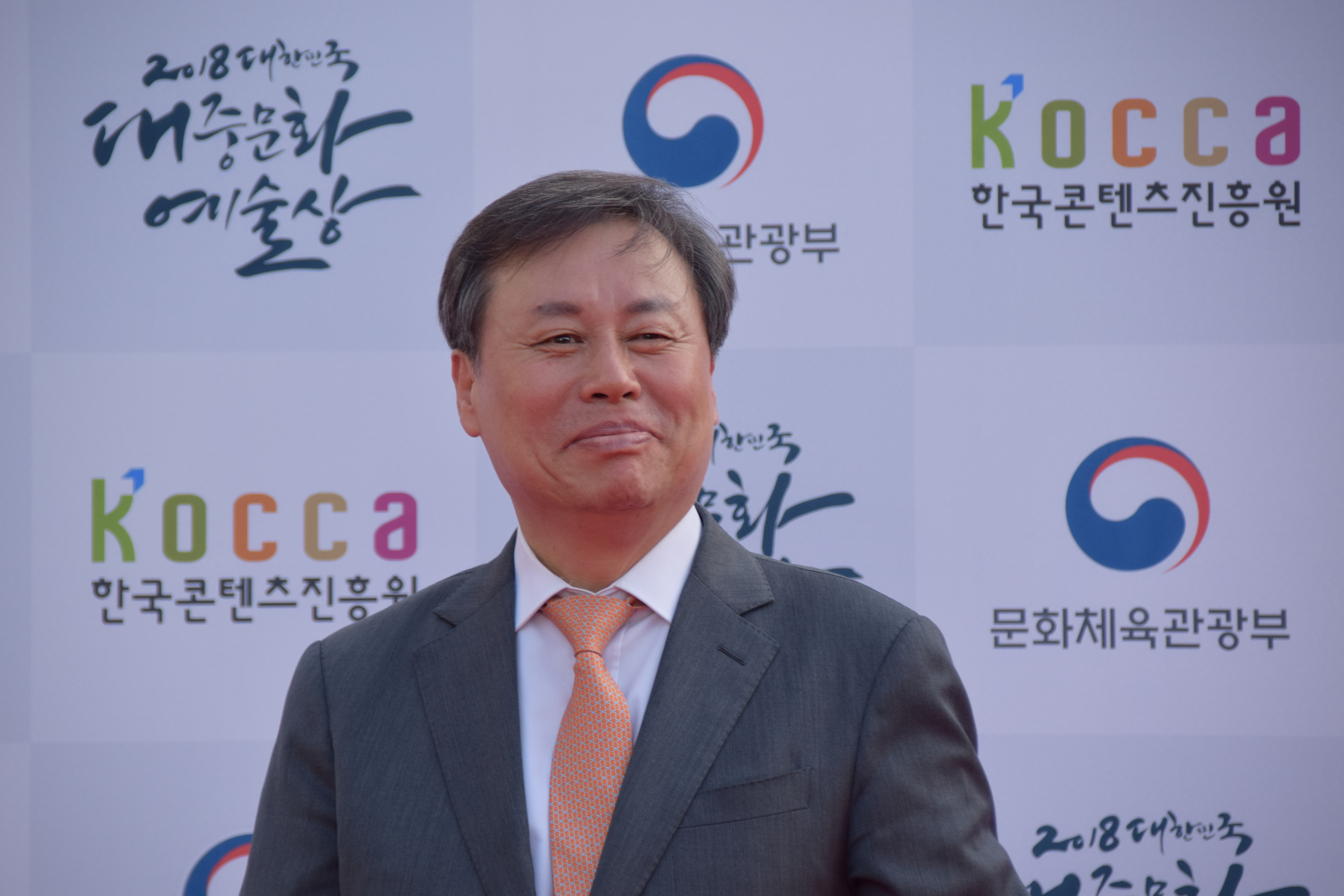
Minister Do in 2018

In the 2012 election he ran at large for the National Assembly under the Democratic Union Party proportional representation and was elected. Among other things he served on the Culture, Sports, Tourism and Broadcasting Communications Committee, and the History Textbook Committee. In 2016 he was re-elected as the member from the reconstituted Heungdeok District.

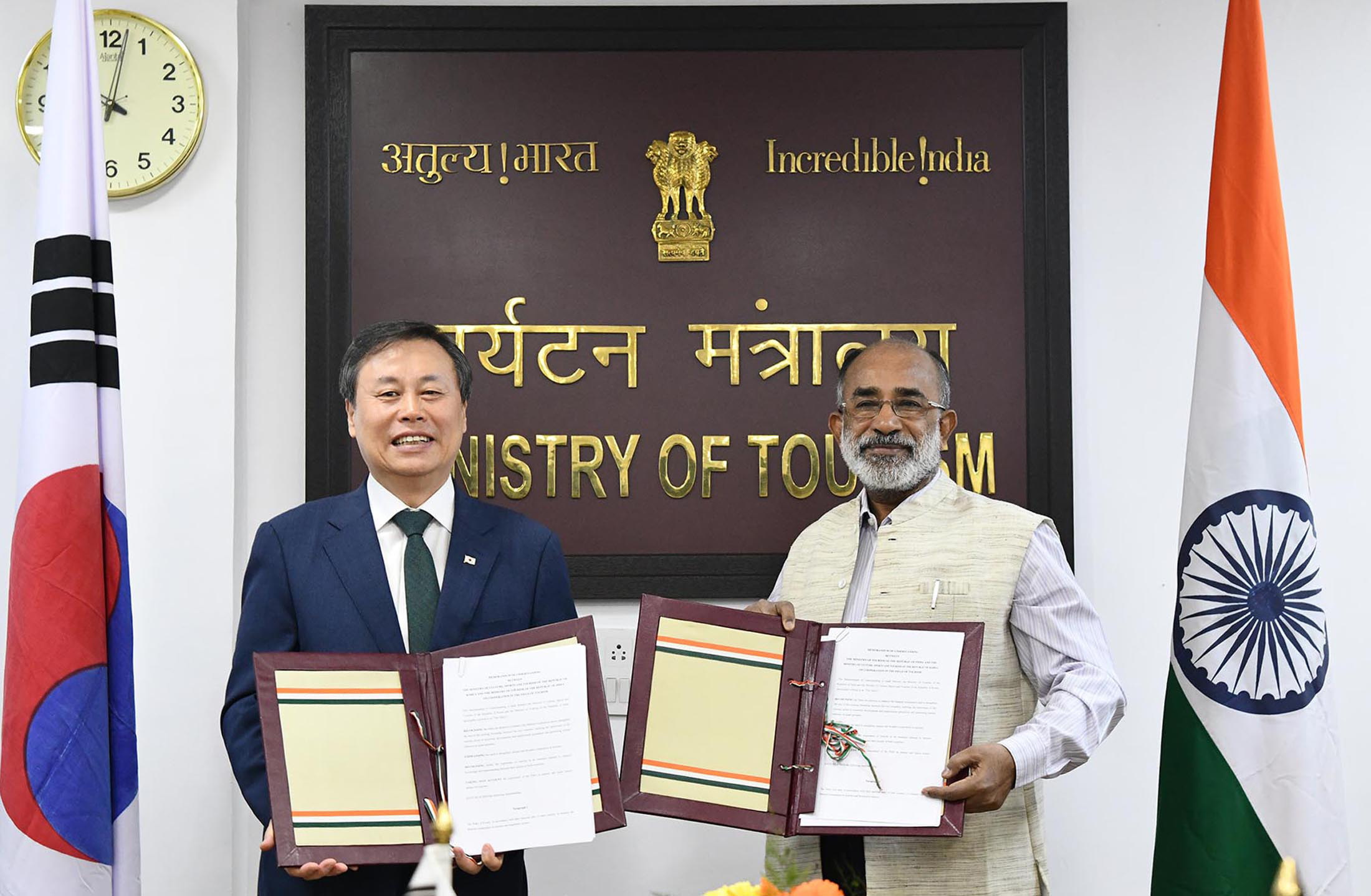
Minister Do and Alphons Kannanthanam

In 2017, he was appointed as the Minister of Culture, Sports and Tourism. In 2020 he was elected as the chair of National Assembly's Culture, Sports and Tourism Committee responsible for scrutinising Ministry of Culture, Sports and Tourism Cultural Heritage Administration and related agencies.

Following the Democratic Party's huge suffer in the 2021 by-elections, the party leadership was immediately collapsed. He then became the party's acting president.

== Election results ==
Year	Elections	Constituency	Political party	Votes (%)	Results
2012	19th National Assembly General Election	Proportional representation (16th)	DUP	7,777,123 (36.45%)	Elected
2016	20th National Assembly General Election	Cheongju Heungdeok (North Chungcheong)	Democratic	49,982 (45.75%)	Won
2020	21st National Assembly General Election	Cheongju Heungdeok (North Chungcheong)	Democratic	74,900 (55.80%)	Won

== Work ==
His first poem was published in 1982. But it was in 1986 with You, my hollyhock, written in part as a tribute to his deceased wife who reminded him of hollyhocks, where the poet's grief at the sudden loss of his love and the intense longing for the happiness he shared with his wife, made him famous. When he turns away "leaving a song by her grave," she follows him home "in the weeping of nameless insects;" when he heads home, "leaving a tear drop upon her grave," she becomes "the rain that soaks through the core of [his] body." In order to overcome his anguish and despair, the poet embraces the world with a new perspective. Through his suffering, the poet has realized that life must go on even if it is more painful than death.

Since that time Do has also written about the issue of the division of Korea, depicting the difficulties of a single people living in a divided country. In his work Do suggests new possibilities for uniting the two Koreas. He has received a number of Korean literary prizes, including the Baekseok Literary Award in 2011 for From three to five and the Korean Literary Award for Literature in 2012 for Leaning on a tree.

=== Works in Korean (Partial) ===
- In Godumi Village (1985)
- You, My Hollyhock (1986)
- You Whom I Love (1988)
- Who Are You (1993)
- A Flower Falls in the Village of People (1994)
- Soft Straight Line (1998)
- The Root of Sorrow (2002)
