= Daedeok District =

Coordinates: 36°20′47″N 127°24′57″E

Daedeok
- Autonomous District
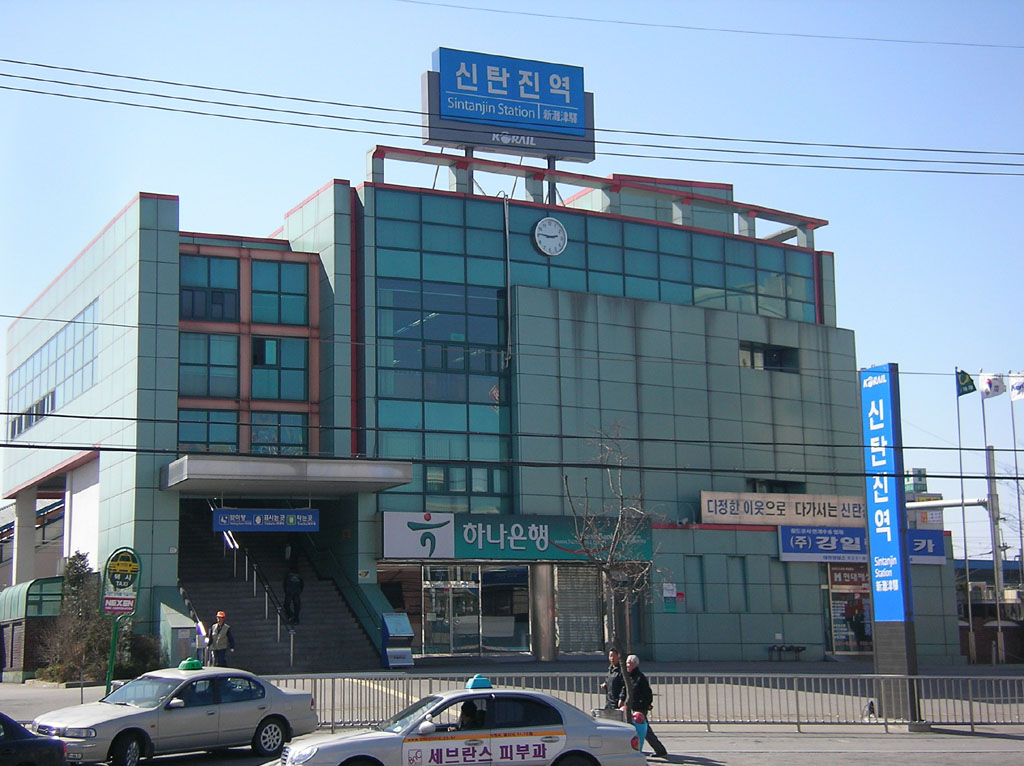

- Flag

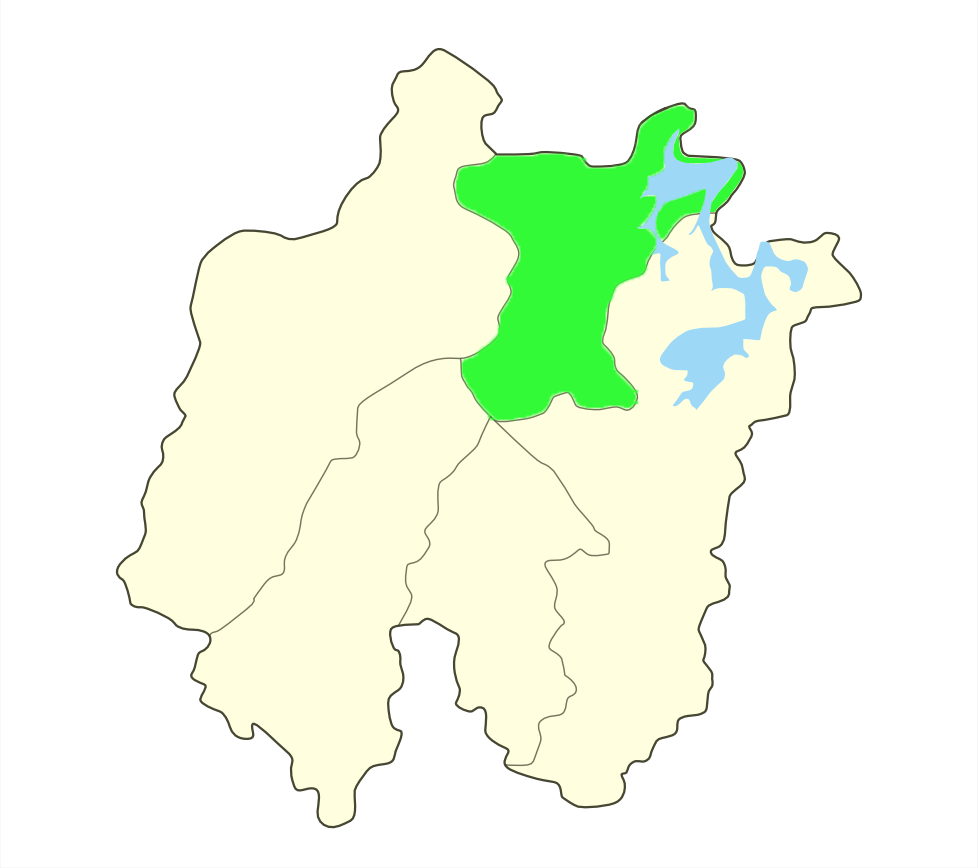
- Country: South Korea
- Region: Hoseo
- Provincial level: Daejeon
- Administrative divisions: 23 administrative dong

Government
  - Mayor: Kim Chan-sul (Democratic)

Area
  - Total: 68.45 km^{2} (26.43 sq mi)

Population (September 2024)
  - Total: 169,171
  - Density: 2,471/km^{2} (6,401/sq mi)
  - Dialect: Chungcheong
- Website: Daedeok District Office

Korean name
- Hangul: 대덕구
- Hanja: 大德區
- RR: Daedeok-gu
- MR: Taedŏk-ku

Daedeok District (Korean: 대덕구) is a district of Daejeon, South Korea. Headquarters of KT&G, Korea Ginseng Corporation and Korea Water Resources, and Daejeon Logistics Terminal, Korea Express are located in this district.

As of the end of January 2023, the population was 172,266, accounting for 11.91% of the total population of Daejeon Metropolitan City, and when comparing the population by region, Songchon-dong has the largest population with 26,609 and Moksang-dong has the lowest with 6,323.
