= Heungdeok District =

- Non-autonomous District
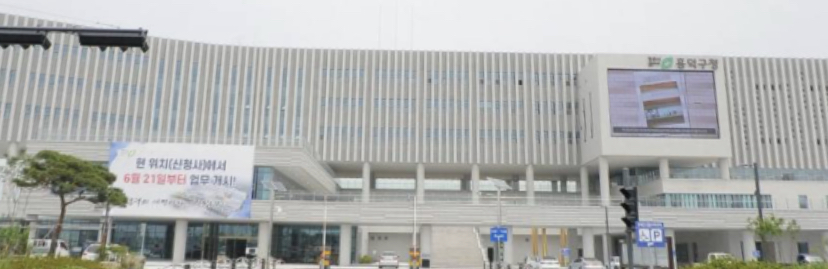
- Heungdeok District office

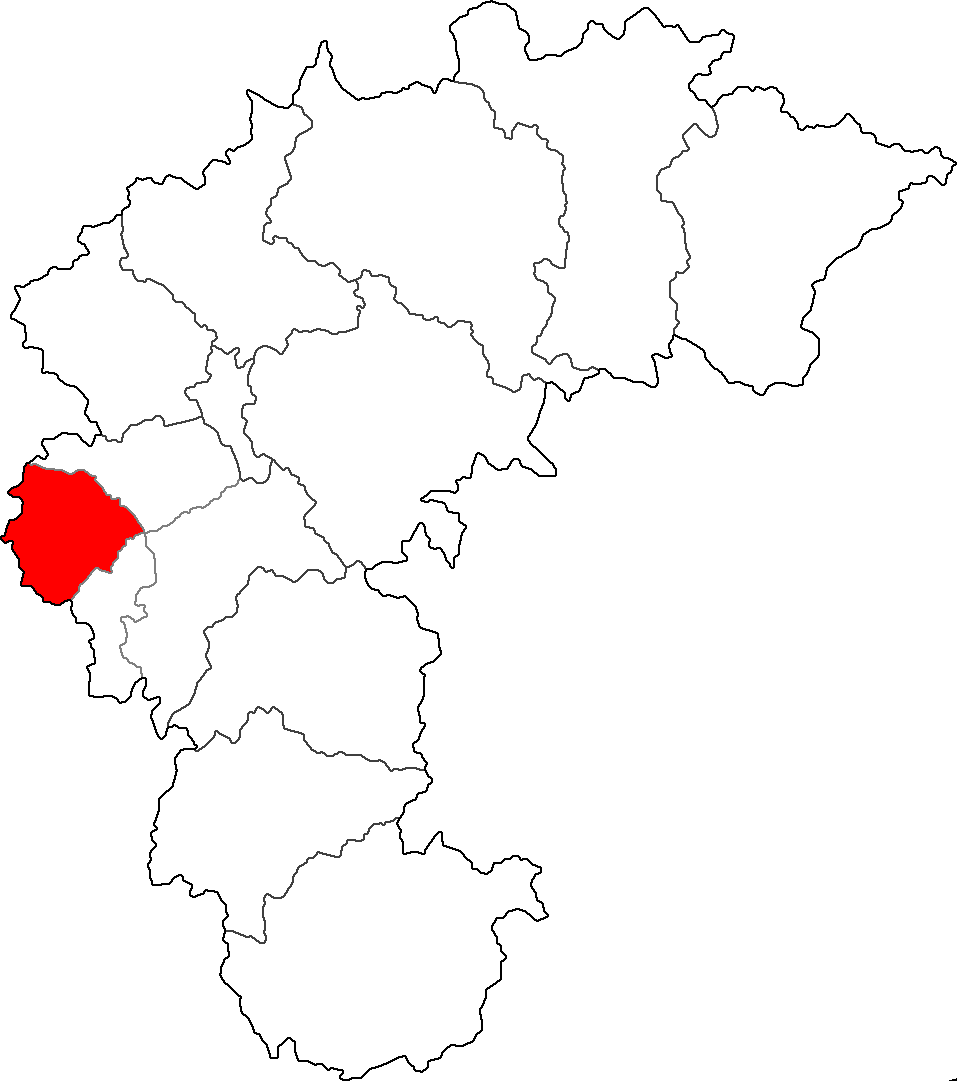
- Coordinates: 36°38′15″N 127°28′11″E
- Country: South Korea
- Region: Hoseo
- Province: North Chungcheong
- City: Cheongju
- Administrative divisions: 1 eup, 2 myeon and 8 dong

Area
  - Total: 198.27 km^{2} (76.55 sq mi)

Population (2014)
  - Total: 254,329
  - Density: 1,282.7/km^{2} (3,322.3/sq mi)
  - Dialect: Chungcheong
- Website: cheongju.go.kr

Korean name
- Hangul: 흥덕구
- Hanja: 興德區
- RR: Heungdeok-gu
- MR: Hŭngdŏk-ku

Heungdeok District (Korean: 흥덕구) is a non-autonomous district of Cheongju, North Chungcheong Province, South Korea. Heungdeok District was re-established from a part of Heungdeok District and a part of Cheongwon County in July 2014. The newly created Seowon District annexed the part of Heungdeok District.

== Administrative divisions ==
Heungdeok District is divided into one town (eup), 2 townships (myeon), and 8 neighborhoods (dong).

	Hangul	Hanja
Osong-eup	오송읍	五松邑
Gangnae-myeon	강내면	江內面
Oksan-myeon	옥산면	玉山面
Uncheon-dong; Sinbong-dong	운천신봉동	雲泉洞 新鳳洞
Bokdae-dong	복대1동	福臺洞
Bokdae-dong	복대2동	福臺洞
Gagyeong-dong	가경동	佳景洞
Bongmyeong-dong	봉명1동	鳳鳴洞
Songjeong-dong	봉명2송정동	松亭洞
Gangseo-dong	강서1동	江西洞
Gangseo-dong	강서2동	江西洞

== Economy ==
Aero K has its headquarters in Osong-eup, Heungdeok District.
