= Sangdang District =

- Non-autonomous District
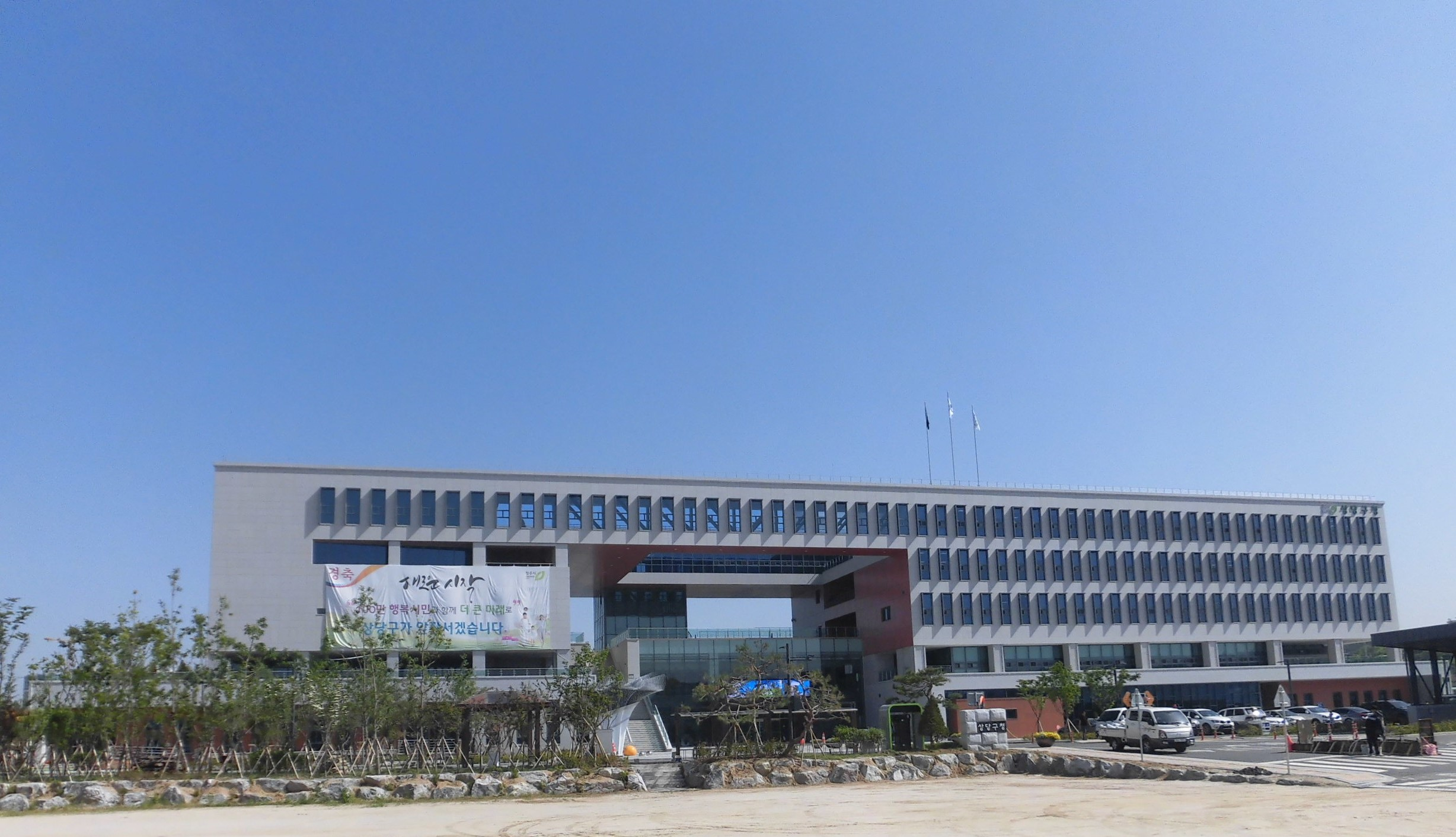
- Sangdang-gu office

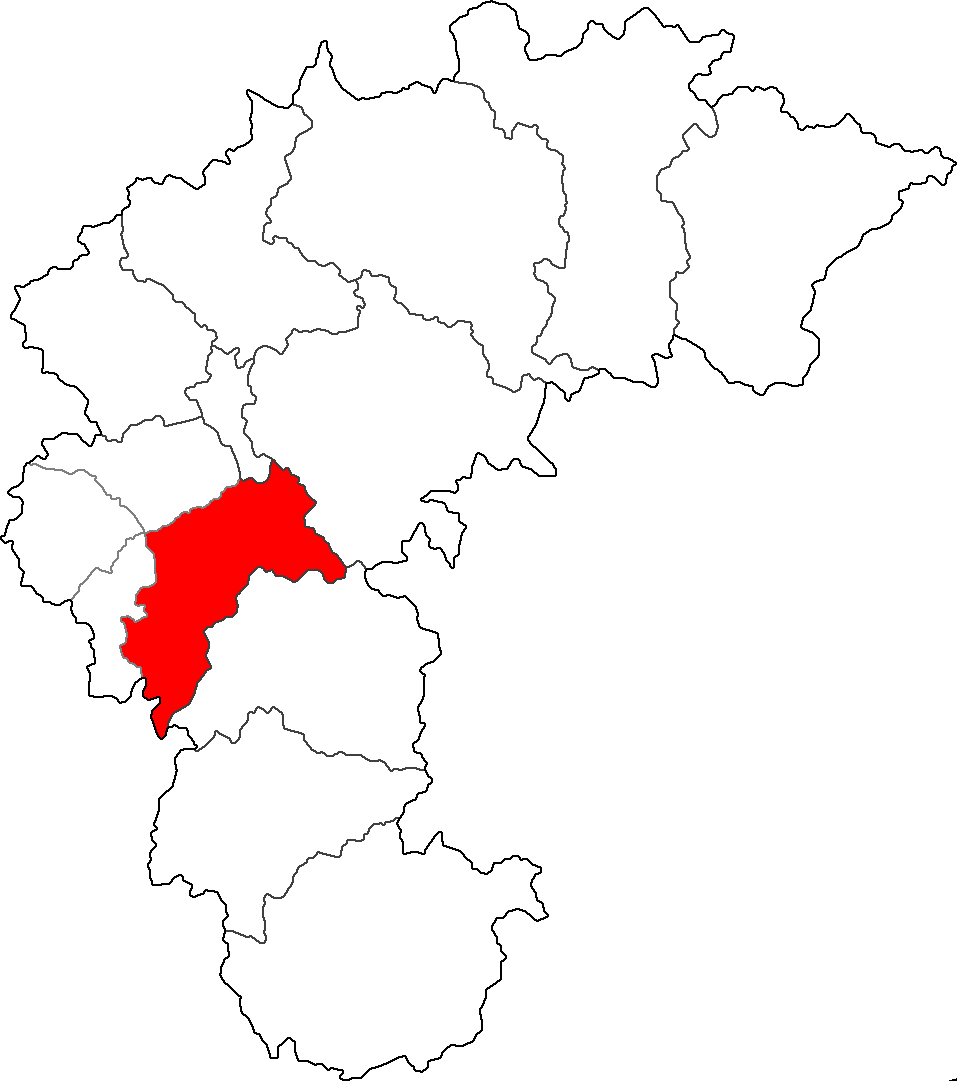
- Coordinates: 36°39′4″N 127°29′12″E
- Country: South Korea
- Region: Hoseo
- Province: North Chungcheong
- City: Cheongju
- Administrative divisions: 5 myeon and 8 dong

Area
  - Total: 404.44 km^{2} (156.16 sq mi)

Population (2014)
  - Total: 180,272
  - Density: 445.73/km^{2} (1,154.4/sq mi)
  - Dialect: Chungcheong
- Website: cheongju.go.kr

Korean name
- Hangul: 상당구
- Hanja: 上黨區
- RR: Sangdang-gu
- MR: Sangdang-gu

Sangdang District (Korean: 상당구) is a non-autonomous district in Cheongju, North Chungcheong Province, South Korea. Sangdang District was re-established from a part of Sangdang District and a part of Cheongwon-gun in July 2014. The newly created Cheongwon District annexed the part of Sangdang District.

== Archaeology ==
The Hungsu Child was found in the Turubong limestone cave located in Munui-myeon.

== Administrative divisions ==
Sangdang District is divided into 5 townships (myeon) and 8 neighborhoods (dong).

	Hangul	Hanja
Nangseong-myeon	낭성면	琅城面
Miwon-myeon	미원면	米院面
Gadeok-myeon	가덕면	加德面
Namil-myeon	남일면	南一面
Munui-myeon	문의면	文義面
Jungang-dong	중앙동	中央洞
Seongan-dong	성안동	城安洞
Tap-dong; Daeseong-dong	탑대성동	塔洞 大成洞
Yeongun-dong	영운동	永雲洞
Geumcheon-dong	금천동	金川洞
Yongdam-dong; Myeongam-dong; Sanseong-dong	용담명암산성동	龍潭洞 明岩洞 山城洞
Yongam-dong	용암1동	龍岩洞
Yongam-dong	용암2동	龍岩洞
