= Lee In-young =

South Korean politician

- 이인영
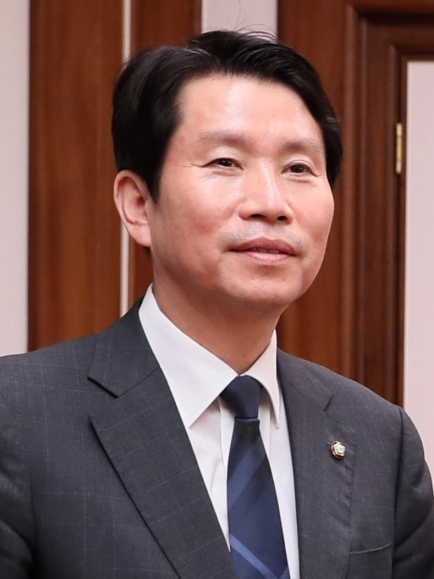

Minister of Unification
- In office 27 July 2020 – 9 May 2022
- President: Moon Jae-in
- Prime Minister: Chung Sye-kyun; Hong Nam-ki (acting); Kim Boo-kyum
- Preceded by: Kim Yeon-chul; Suh Ho (acting)
- Succeeded by: Kwon Young-se

Member of the National Assembly for Guro A (Seoul)
- Incumbent
- Assumed office 30 May 2012
- Preceded by: Lee Beom-rae
- In office 30 May 2004 – 29 May 2008
- Preceded by: Kim Ki-bae
- Succeeded by: Lee Beom-rae

Personal details
- Born: 28 June 1964 (age 62) Chungju, South Korea
- Party: Democratic (2015)
- Other political affiliations: MDP (1999–2003); Uri (2003–2007); UNDP (2007–2008); UDP (2008); Democratic (2008) (2008–2011); DUP (2011–2013); Democratic (2013) (2013–2014); NPAD (2014–2015)
- Spouse: Lee Bo-eun
- Education: Korea University
- Occupation: Activist, politician

Lee In-young (Korean: 이인영, born 28 June 1964) is a South Korean activist and politician who served as the Minister of Unification from 2020 to 9 May 2022. Prior to this, he was the parliamentary leader of the Democratic Party from 2019 to 2020. He has been the Member of the National Assembly for Guro A constituency from 2004 to 2008 and since 2012. Before entering to politics, he was the 1st President of the Association of National University Student Representatives, an anti-establishment student organisation.

== Early life ==
Lee was born in Chungju, North Chungcheong in 1964. His father, Lee Moon-heum (died in 1988), was a primary school teacher. He was educated at Chungju High School and completed a bachelor's degree in Korean language, as well as a master's degree in Information and Communications at Korea University.

He began to pay attention to politics during his university life, after joining a political event. In 1987, he was the President of Student Council, who led a protest as a part of June Struggle to achieve direct election for the President of the Republic. He was detained due to the breach of the National Security Act and jailed for a while. Soon, he was released and formed the Association of National University Student Representatives (ANUSR) in July. He subsequently became its President and served for a year. After this, he became the assistant administrator of the National Union for Nationalist Democratic Movement (NUNDM) and the organisation director of the National Alliance for Democracy and Ethnic Reunification (NADER). At the NUNDM, he met Kim Geun-tae, the policy director who later be the Chairman of the Uri Party, as well as his wife, Lee Bo-eun. He then became the follower of Kim.

== Political career ==
Lee was intended to start his political career in 1990, but promised with other members including Woo Sang-ho, served as the Vice President of the ANUSR under Lee, to not do it for 10 years in order to "not ruin the meaning of student movements". He, along with Woo, were brought to the Millennium Democratic Party (MDP) by Kim Dae-jung in 1999. He ran as the MP for Guro 1st constituency, but lost to Kim Ki-bae of the Grand National Party (GNP). He could be elected in the 2004 election under the banner of the Uri Party, the splinter group of the MDP. For the first term as an MP, he was a member of Committee of Education and Public Administration and Security Committee of the National Assembly.

He lost to Lee Beom-rae in the 2008 election, but continued his political career. In 2010, he ran as the party president of the Democratic Party but lost to Sohn Hak-kyu. Instead, he became one of the Vice Presidents. He also ran for the presidency of the newly-formed Democratic Unionist Party, but lost to Han Myung-sook and elected as a Vice President.

Lee came back as an MP in the 2012 election and worked for Strategy and Finance Committee, Environment and Labour Committee and Gender Equality and Family Committee. He ran again for the presidency of the New Politics Alliance for Democracy in 2015, but came as 3rd and lost behind of Moon Jae-in and Park Jie-won. He was re-elected in 2016 election.

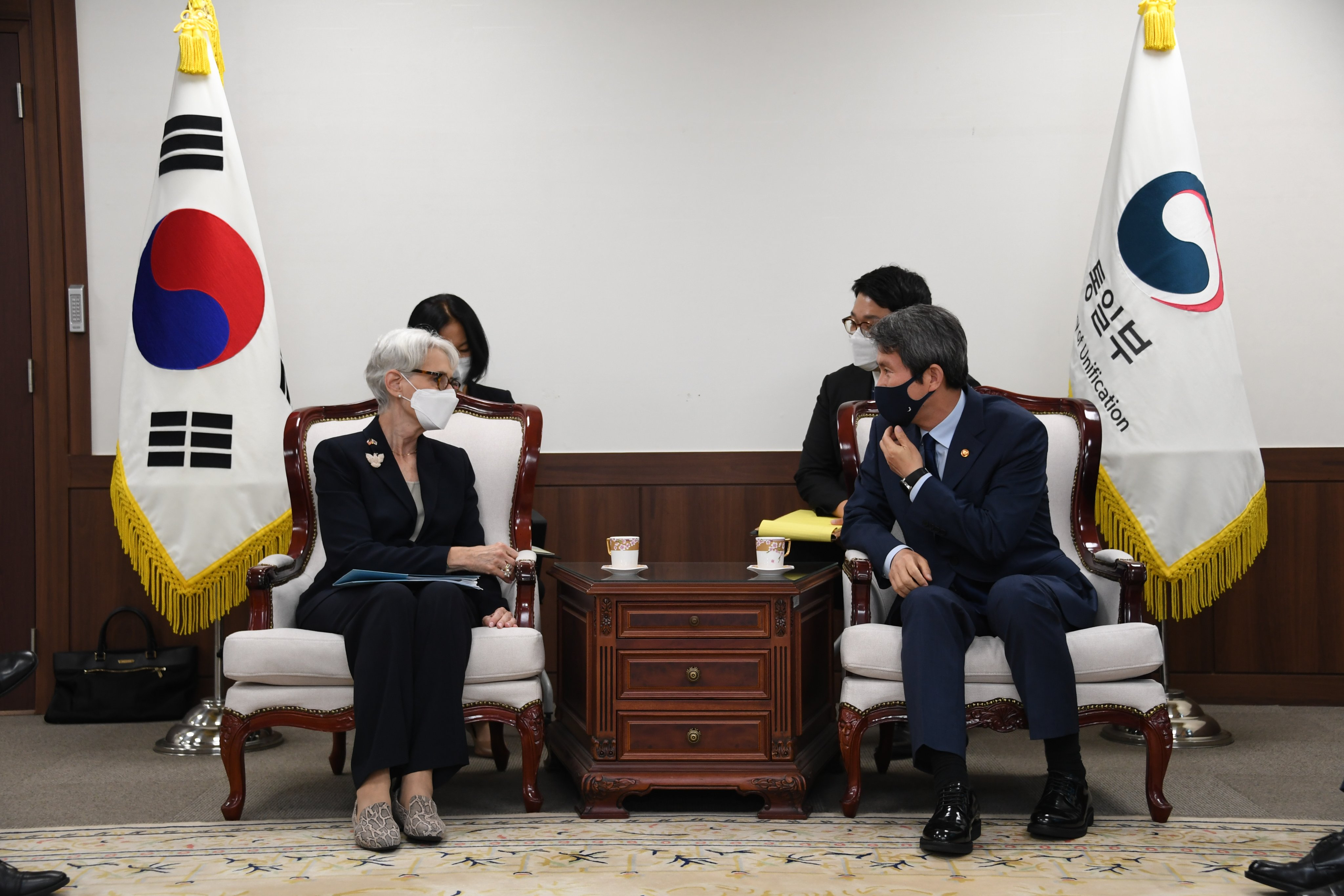
Lee meets with U.S. Deputy Secretary of State Wendy Sherman in Seoul in July 2021.

On 21 April 2019, Lee declared to run as the parliamentary leader of the Democratic Party. He was endorsed by National Alliance for Democracy and Peace, The Better Future and The Owls Group within the party. On 8 May, he gained 54 votes and defeated Kim Tae-nyeon who gained 37 votes and Roh Woong-rae gained 34 votes in the first round. Since no one gained the majority, Lee and Kim went to the second round in the same day, where Lee gained 76 votes and defeated Kim with 49 votes. Lee was immediately elected as the new parliamentary leader of the party, replacing the incumbent Hong Young-pyo.

On 3 July 2020, Lee was nominated as the Minister of Unification, following the resignation of Kim Yeon-chul due to North Korea's destruction of the Inter-Korean Liaison Office in June. He was officially appointed to the position on 27 July.

== Political views ==
Ideologically, Lee is regarded as a left-wing in Democrats. During an interview with Park Mi-sook of Moonthly Joongang on 17 April 2013, Park asked Lee that Democrats failed as it has moved to left. Lee replied: "Then should the Democratic Party be a conservative party?" He also added that there's no centrism in politics, by providing an example: "What is the centre between reducing and increasing the temporary employees?" However, during the parliamentary leader election campaign, he declared himself to move his position from left to centre.

== Controversy ==
On 10 May 2019, shortly after being elected as the parliamentary leader, it was reported that Lee denounced civil servants along with Kim Soo-hyun, the policy director of the Blue House. Lee mentioned by providing an example of the Minister of Land, Infrastructure and Transport (MoLIT) Kim Hyun-mee, which is that "they do weird things if there's no Minister". His remark was soon condemned by the trade union of the MoLIT, opposition politicians i.e. Jun Hee-kyung of the Liberty Korea Party (LKP), Lee Jong-chul of the Bareunmirae Party, Park Jie-won of the Party for Democracy and Peace (PDP) and the other civil servants. Prime Minister Lee Nak-yeon also criticised the remark.

== Election results ==
Year	Elections	Constituency	Political party	Votes (%)	Remarks
2000	16th National Assembly General Election	Guro A (Seoul)	MDP	41,432 (47.02%)	Defeated (2nd)
2004	17th National Assembly General Election	Guro A (Seoul)	Uri	48,970 (44.73%)	Won
2008	18th National Assembly General Election	Guro A (Seoul)	UDP	38,878 (45.40%)	Defeated (2nd)
2012	19th National Assembly General Election	Guro A (Seoul)	DUP	58,381 (52.22%)	Won
2016	20th National Assembly General Election	Guro A (Seoul)	Democratic	64,063 (52.02%)	Won
2020	21st National Assembly General Election	Guro A (Seoul)	Democratic	75,865 (53.92%)	Won
2024	22nd National Assembly General Election	Guro A (Seoul)	Democratic	80,182 (55.74%)	Won
