= Seongbuk A =

Constituency in Seoul, South Korea

- Single-member constituency for the National Assembly
- Location of the constituency
- District(s): Seongbuk District (part)
- Region: Seoul
- Electorate: 202,294 (2020)

Current constituency
- Created: 1988
- Seats: 1
- Party: Democratic Party
- Member: Kim Young-bae
- Created from: Seongbuk

Seongbuk A (Korean: 성북구 갑) is a constituency of the National Assembly of South Korea. The constituency consists of portions of Seongbuk District, Seoul. As of 2020, 202,294 eligible voters were registered in the constituency. The constituency was created in 1988 from the Seongbuk constituency.

== History ==
Throughout its history, Seongbuk A more often elected members of centre-left, liberal parties to represent the constituency. The centre-left Democratic Party's Lee Chul, who was elected as an independent, was the first member to represent Seongbuk A in the National Assembly. He was re-elected in the 1992 South Korean legislative election, but lost to Yoo Jae-geon of the liberal National Congress for New Politics in the 1996 legislative election. Yoo went on to win re-election in 2000 and 2004. The conservative Grand National Party's Jung Tae-geun won the seat in the 2008 legislative election, marking the first time a conservative party won the constituency. However, he was defeated by the liberal Democratic United Party's You Seung-hee in the subsequent legislative election held in 2012. You Seung-hee won re-election in 2016 as the liberal Democratic Party's candidate, defeating Jung once again. Kim Young-bae, the former Mayor of Seongbuk, was nominated as the Democratic Party's candidate for Seongbuk A in the 2020 legislative election, having defeated incumbent You Seung-hee in the party's primary for the constituency. Kim went on to win the election, defeating Han Sang-hak of the United Future Party by more than 24 points.

== Boundaries ==
The constituency encompasses the neighborhoods of Gireum 1-dong, Donam 2-dong, Anam-dong, Bomun-dong, Jeongneung-dong, Seongbuk-dong, Samseon-dong, and Dongseon-dong.

== List of members of the National Assembly ==
Election	Member	Party	Dates	Notes
1988	Lee Chul	Independent	1988–1996	Chairman of the Korail (2005–2008)
1992	Lee Chul	Democratic	1988–1996	Chairman of the Korail (2005–2008)
1996	Yoo Jae-geon	National Congress	1996–2008	Left the Grand Unified Democratic New Party on January 30, 2008 Joined the Liberty Forward Party on January 31, 2008
2000	Yoo Jae-geon	Millennium Democratic	1996–2008	Left the Grand Unified Democratic New Party on January 30, 2008 Joined the Liberty Forward Party on January 31, 2008
2004	Yoo Jae-geon	Uri (Note: merged into the Grand Unified Democratic New Party on August 20, 2007)	1996–2008	Left the Grand Unified Democratic New Party on January 30, 2008 Joined the Liberty Forward Party on January 31, 2008
2008	Jung Tae-geun	Grand National (Note: Independent from December 13, 2011)	2008–2012	Deputy Mayor for Political Affairs Seoul (2005–2006); Left the Grand National Party on December 13, 2011
2012	You Seung-hee	Democratic United	2012–2020	
2016	You Seung-hee	Democratic	2012–2020	
2020	Kim Young-bae	Democratic	2020–present	Mayor of Seongbuk (2010–2018)
2024	Kim Young-bae	Democratic	2020–present	Mayor of Seongbuk (2010–2018)

== Election results ==
=== 2024 ===
Legislative Election 2024: Seongbuk A
Party	Candidate	Votes	%	±%
Democratic	Kim Young-bae	74,707	55.68	▼5.12
People Power	Lee Jong-chul	52,511	39.14	▲2.64
New Future	You Seung-hee	6,934	5.16	new
Rejected ballots		1,752	–	
Turnout		135,904	69.40	▲1.09
Registered electors		195,813		
Democratic hold		Swing		

=== 2020 ===
Legislative Election 2020: Seongbuk A
Party	Candidate	Votes	%	±%
Democratic	Kim Young-bae	82,954	60.90	+13.03
United Future	Han Sang-hak	49,727	36.50	+0.25
Minsaeng	Park Chun-lim	2,642	1.93	new
National Revolutionary	Choi Won-yong	880	0.64	new
Rejected ballots		1,983	–	
Turnout		138,186	68.31	+7.68
Registered electors		202,294		
Democratic hold		Swing		

=== 2016 ===
Legislative Election 2016: Seongbuk A
Party	Candidate	Votes	%	±%
Democratic	You Seung-hee	57,819	47.87	−3.39
Saenuri	Jung Tae-geun	43,789	36.25	−8.54
People	Do Cheon-soo	17,883	14.80	new
People's United	Park Cheol-woo	1,273	1.05	new
Rejected ballots		1,383	–	
Turnout		122,147	60.63	+6.87
Registered electors		201,457		
Democratic hold		Swing		

=== 2012 ===
Legislative Election 2012: Seongbuk A
Party	Candidate	Votes	%	±%
Democratic United	You Seung-hee	54,057	51.26	+14.46
Independent	Jung Tae-geun	47,234	44.79	−10.60
Korea Vision	Kang Seung-kyu	5,127	6.13	new
Future Union	Choi Deok-chan	1,095	1.03	new
Rejected ballots		2,461	–	
Turnout		107,914	53.76	+9.31
Registered electors		200,755		
Democratic United gain from Independent				

=== 2008 ===
Legislative Election 2008: Seongbuk A
Party	Candidate	Votes	%	±%
Grand National	Jung Tae-geun	46,260	55.39	+14.72
United Democratic	Son Bong-suk	30,736	36.80	new
Democratic Labor	Jung Tae-heung	5,127	6.13	−0.87
Family Party for Peace and Unity	Kim Hyeong-joon	1,392	44.45	new
Rejected ballots		943	–	
Turnout		84,458	44.45	−17.32
Registered electors		190,021		
Grand National gain from Liberty Forward				

=== 2004 ===
Legislative Election 2004: Seongbuk A
Party	Candidate	Votes	%	±%
Uri	Yoo Jae-geon	44,531	42.84	new
Grand National	Jung Tae-geun	42,280	40.67	−4.45
Millennium Democratic	Lim Yeong-hwa	8,049	7.74	−40.19
Democratic Labor	Kim Joon-soo	7,282	7.00	new
United Liberal Democrats	Sung Tae-jin	1,090	1.04	new
Independent	Bae Gi-soo	714	0.68	new
Rejected ballots		711	–	
Turnout		104,657	61.77	+8.74
Registered electors		169,441		
Uri hold		Swing		

=== 2000 ===
Legislative Election 2000: Seongbuk A
Party	Candidate	Votes	%	±%
Millennium Democratic	Yoo Jae-geon	44,845	47.93	new
Grand National	Jung Tae-geun	42,296	45.12	new
Youth Progressive	Jung Hoe-jin	4,881	5.21	new
Democratic People's	Jeon Jae-woong	1,528	1.63	new
Rejected ballots		1,049	–	
Turnout		94,599	53.03	−7.41
Registered electors		178,403		
Millennium Democratic hold		Swing		

=== 1996 ===
Legislative Election 1996: Seongbuk A
Party	Candidate	Votes	%	±%
National Congress	Yoo Jae-geon	39,159	36.06	new
Democratic	Lee Chul	34,555	31.82	new
New Korea	Shim Eui-suk	22,695	20.89	−14.41
United Liberal Democrats	Chae Soo-ho	8,042	7.40	new
Independent	Kim Sae-hyeon	1,728	1.59	new
Non-Partisan National Association	Song Young-gi	1,440	1.32	new
Independent	Lim Tae-baek	971	0.89	new
Rejected ballots		1,243	–	
Turnout		109,833	60.44	−7.02
Registered electors		181,721		
National Congress gain from Democratic		Swing		

=== 1992 ===
Legislative Election 1992: Seongbuk A
Party	Candidate	Votes	%	±%
Democratic	Lee Chul	61,719	49.70	new
Democratic Liberal	Kim Jeong-rye	43,846	35.31	new
Unification National	Yoo In-hyun	14,243	11.47	new
New Political Reform	Song Young-gi	4,354	3.50	new
Rejected ballots		1,328	–	
Turnout		125,490	67.46	−1.37
Registered electors		186,008		
Democratic hold		Swing		

=== 1988 ===
Legislative Election 1988: Seongbuk A
Party	Candidate	Votes	%	±%
Independent	Lee Chul	40,652	31.15	–
Democratic Justice	Kim Jeong-rye	30,603	23.45	–
Peace Democratic	Sul Hoon	29,482	22.59	–
New Democratic Republican	Choi Jae-woo	16,326	12.51	–
Reunification Democratic	Koh In-soon	10,578	8.10	–
Social Democratic	Song Young-gi	1,882	1.44	–
Hankyoreh Democratic	Kim Hyun-shik	953	0.73	–
Rejected ballots		1,039	–	
Turnout		131,515	68.83	–
Registered electors		191,086		
Independent win (new seat)				

== See also ==
- List of constituencies of the National Assembly of South Korea
