= Lee Jong-seok (politician) =

South Korean politician (born 1958)

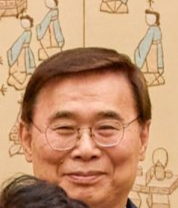

Korean name
- Hangul: 이종석
- Hanja: 李鍾奭
- RR: I Jongseok
- MR: I Chongsŏk

Lee Jong-seok (born May 11, 1958) is a South Korean politician who is director of the South Korean National Intelligence Service (NIS). He formerly served as the South Korean Minister of Unification and chairman of the National Security Council, having succeeded Chung Dong-young on February 10, 2006. His appointment was controversial as certain lawmakers wanted to separate the two posts, while others were troubled by questions raised during his confirmation hearings over his apparent failure to properly brief President Roh Moo-hyun. Prior to his appointment, he had been the council's deputy chief.

He was a member of the ruling Uri Party. A graduate of Sungkyunkwan University who spent most of his career as an academic, he authored the 2000 book "Understanding Contemporary North Korea". He is widely seen as an important behind-the-scenes figure in South Korea's neutralist realignment in foreign policy between the United States and North Korea, working on the Sunshine Policy and accompanying Kim Dae-jung to the North Korean summit meeting in 2000.

Lee is now a senior researcher at the Sejong Institute in the southern Seoul suburb of Seongnam, Gyeonggi Province.

Following the 2025 South Korean president election, it was reported the Lee was a potential pick to serve in South Korean President Lee Jae-myung's cabinet. On June 4, 2025, Lee Jae-myung nominated Lee Jong-seok to be director of the NIS. His scrutiny hearing before the South Korean National Assembly would take place on June 19, 2025. At the start of this hearing, Lee would take his oath, and soon afterwards confirmed to be now serving as the director of the National Intelligence Service (NIS).

Political offices
Preceded by Chung Dong-young	Unification Minister of South Korea; February 10, 2006–December 12, 2006	Succeeded by Lee Jae-joung
Preceded by Chung Dong-young	Chairman of the National Security Council; February 10, 2006–present	Succeeded by incumbent
