= Chae Su-chan =

South Korean politician (born 1955)

Chae Su-chan 채수찬 蔡秀澯

Member of the National Assembly
- In office 30 May 2004 – 29 May 2008
- Preceded by: Chung Dong-young
- Succeeded by: Kim Sae-woong
- Constituency: Jeonju Deokjin (North Jeolla)

Personal details
- Born: 1955 (age 70–71) Jinan County, North Jeolla Province, South Korea
- Education: Seoul National University, University of Pennsylvania
- Profession: Economist

Korean name
- Hangul: 채수찬
- Hanja: 蔡秀澯
- RR: Chae Suchan
- MR: Ch'ae Such'an

Chae Su-chan (Korean: 채수찬; born 1955) is a South Korean academic and politician. He is a former member of the National Assembly of Korea and a professor at the Korea Advanced Institute of Science and Technology. He also serves as the chairman of the board of the Han River Society.

== Academic and political career ==
While in the National Assembly, he was a member of the National Policy Committee, which had oversight over the Financial Supervisory Service and the Fair Trade Commission, and also a member of the Finance and Economy Committee, which had oversight over the Ministry of Finance and Economy. He also served as the Special Envoy of President Roh Mu-hyun to the 2005 World Economic Forum at Davos. During the Asian economic crisis, he advised Korean policy makers including President Kim Dae-jung, and wrote columns both in Korean and in English in worldwide newspapers regarding the solutions to the crisis.

Before he was elected to the Korean National Assembly, he had been an economics professor at Rice University for almost 20 years. He earned a B.S. and M.S. in mathematics in his native South Korea before coming to the University of Pennsylvania, where he earned his Ph.D. in economics in 1985.

Suchan Chae's professional publications have mostly been in the areas of bargaining theory, industrial organization, and general economic theory. He has held visiting positions in universities and research institutes in several countries. In South Korea, he has been a visitor at the Korea Development Institute, Korea Information Society Development Institute, and the Korea Institute for International Economic Policy. He has also been as a guest scholar with the Brookings Institution.

== Election results ==
Year	Elections	Constituency	Political party	Votes (%)	Results
2004	17th National Assembly General Election	Jeonju Deokjin (North Jeolla)	Uri	86,270 (72.52%)	Won
