= Cho Myoung-gyon =

South Korean politician (born 1957)

- 조명균

Minister of Unification
- In office 3 July 2017 – 8 April 2019
- President: Moon Jae-in
- Prime Minister: Lee Nak-yeon
- Preceded by: Hong Yong-pyo
- Succeeded by: Kim Yeon-chul

Personal details
- Born: 17 November 1957 (age 68) Uijeongbu, South Korea
- Party: independent
- Education: Sungkyunkwan University; Seoul National University
- Religion: Roman Catholicism

Cho Myoung-gyon (Korean: 조명균; Hanja: 趙明均; born 17 November 1957) is a South Korean politician previously served as President Moon Jae-in's first Minister of Unification.

After passing the state exam in 1979, Cho spent most of his career at the Ministry of Unification. He actively participated in multiple projects and negotiations with Pyongyang which resulted in enhanced Inter-Korean relations during Kim Dae-jung and Roh Moo-hyun administrations commended by then-Minister Jeong Se-hyun. He left public service upon the beginning of the new administration in 2008. Since then he completely distanced himself from politics before being appointed as Minister in 2017.

During his term as Minister, Inter-Korean relations dramatically improved which was deteriorated after Kim and Roh administrations.

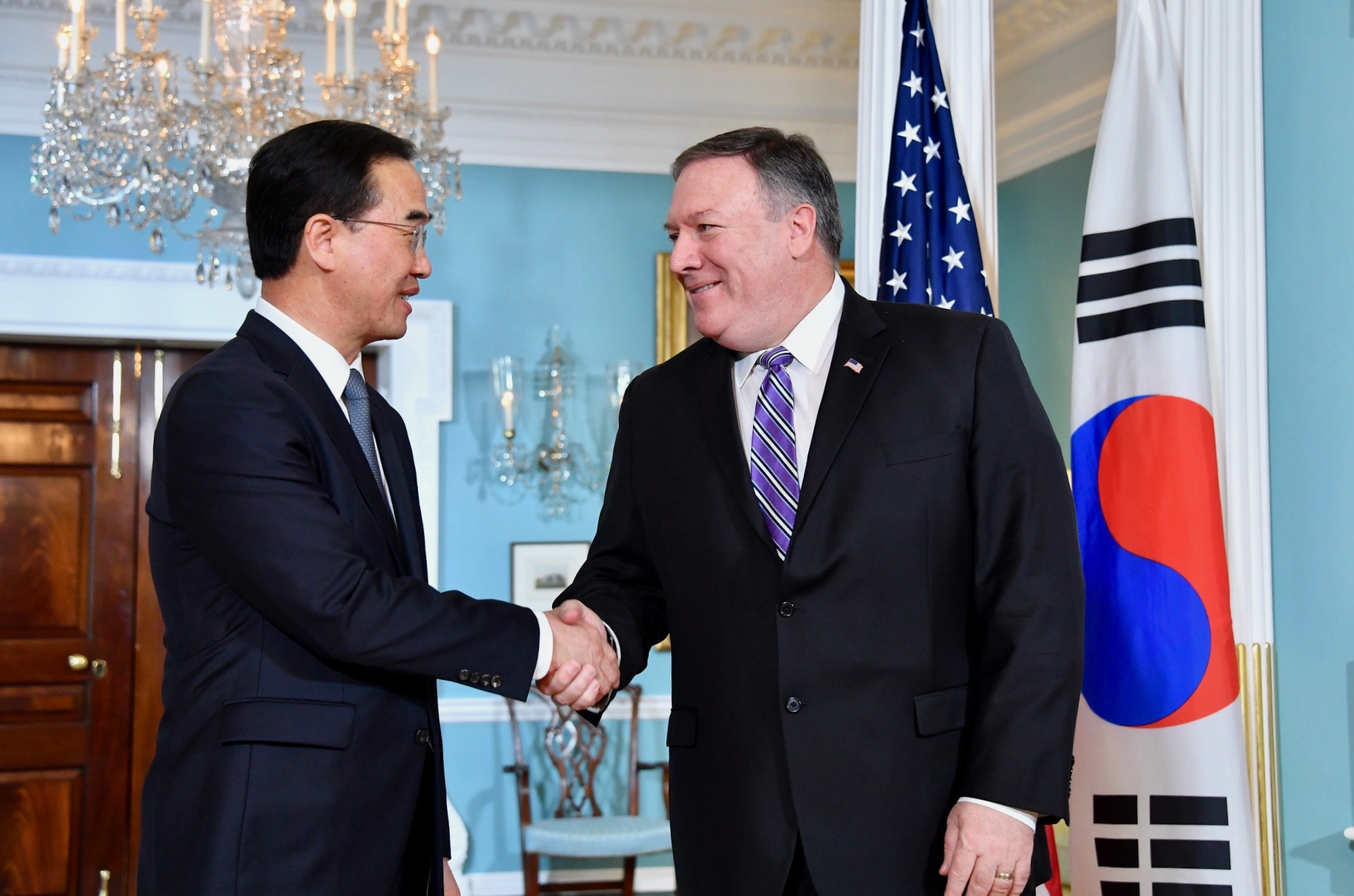
Cho Myoung-gyon meeting US Secretary of State Mike Pompeo

He holds two degrees - a bachelor's in statistics from Sungkyunkwan University and a master's in administration from Seoul National University.
