= Kim Sung-joo =

Kim Sung-joo or similar may refer to:

- Kim Il Sung, founder and first leader of North Korea, whose birth name is Kim Seong-ju
- Kim Sung-joo (entrepreneur) (born 1956), South Korean entrepreneur and businesswoman
- Kim Sung-joo (politician, born 1964), South Korean politician
- Kim Sung-joo (presenter) (born 1972), South Korean former announcer and TV host
- Kim Seong-ju (born 1990), South Korean football midfielder for Ulsan Hyundai
- Kim Sung-joo (entertainer) (born 1994), South Korean singer and member of Uniq
- Kim Seong-joo (born 1998), South Korean football forward for the Jeonnam Dragons
