= Lee Jae-joung =

South Korean politician (born 1944)

- Hangul: 이재정
- Hanja: 李在禎
- RR: I Jaejeong
- MR: I Chaejŏng

Lee Jae-joung (Korean: 이재정; born March 1, 1944) was the Unification Minister of South Korea. As head of the Ministry of Unification, Lee is tasked with working toward the reunification of Korea.

Lee assumed the position of Minister for Unification, taking over from Lee Jeong-suk (now a Senior Fellow at the Sejong Institute and Member of the Presidential Advisory Group on the Inter-Korean Summit) in December 2006. The appointment made him the 33rd Minister for Unification, and in the intense prelude to the second inter-Korean Leader's Summit of 2–4 October 2007, the appointment also made him a regular figure in the Korean-language media.

== See also ==
- Government of South Korea
- Foreign relations of South Korea
- Division of Korea

Political offices
Preceded by Lee Jong-seok	Unification Minister of South Korea; 2006–2008	Succeeded by Kim Ha-joong
Party political offices
Preceded by (create)	Leader of People's Participation Party; 2010–2011	Succeeded by Rhyu Si-min
