= Kim Sung-joo (politician, born 1964) =

South Korean entrepreneur and politician

- 김성주
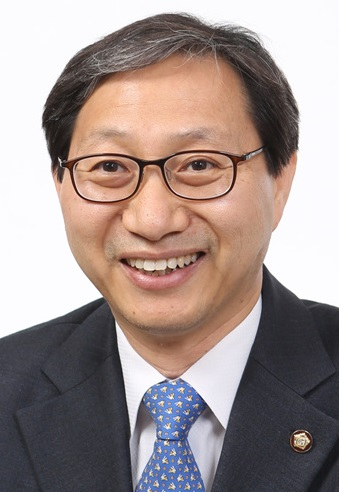

Member of the National Assembly
- In office 30 May 2020 – 29 May 2024
- Preceded by: Chung Dong-young
- Succeeded by: Chung Dong-young
- Constituency: Jeonju C (North Jeolla)
- In office 30 May 2012 – 29 May 2016
- Preceded by: Chung Dong-young
- Succeeded by: Kim Kwang-soo (Jeonju A, North Jeolla); Chung Dong-young (Jeonju C, North Jeolla)
- Constituency: Jeonju Deokjin (North Jeolla)

Chairman of the National Pension Service
- In office 7 November 2017 – 30 December 2019
- President: Moon Jae-in
- Prime Minister: Lee Nak-yon
- Preceded by: Moon Hyung-pyo
- Succeeded by: Park Jung-bae (acting); Kim Yongjin
- Incumbent
- Assumed office 15 December 2025
- President: Lee Jae Myung
- Prime Minister: Kim Min-seok; Han Seong-sook
- Preceded by: Kim Tae-hyun

Personal details
- Born: Kim Seong-ju; 10 April 1964 (age 62) Jeonju, South Korea
- Party: Democratic Party of Korea
- Education: Seoul University
- Religion: Roman Catholic (Christian name : Macharius)

Korean name
- Hangul: 김성주
- Hanja: 金成柱
- RR: Gim Seongju
- MR: Kim Sŏngju

Kim Sung-joo (Korean: 김성주; Hanja: 金成柱; 10 April 1964) is a South Korean entrepreneur and politician who is the representative of the Jeonju C(Deokjin) constituency in the National Assembly. He served as the Chairman of the National Pension Service from 2017 to 2019.

== Early life and education ==
Kim was born in Jeonju, South Korea on April 10, 1964. During Chun Doo-hwan's regime, he was arrested and put in prison two times for participating in democratization movements. The human rights lawyer that defended Kim at the time was Park Won-soon, the Mayor of Seoul from 2011 to 2020. He graduated from Seoul University in 1988 and established a computer software-related company called Hannuri Computer (now called Hannuri Net) and became a successful youth entrepreneur. He is often called "the Bill Gates of Jeonju" due to his successful computer-related business career.

== Political career ==
Kim ran in the 1998 South Korean local elections to become a member of the Jeonju City Council, however, he came in second place and lost the election. He ran in the 2006 South Korean local elections and was elected a member to the North Jeolla Provincial Assembly. He was reelected to the North Jeolla Provincial Assembly in the 2010 South Korean local elections. Kim was a candidate for the North Jeolla (Jeonbuk) Jeonju Deokjin-gu constituency in the 2012 South Korean legislative election and was elected with 62.52% of the vote.

In the 2016 South Korean legislative election, Kim Seong-ju ran for the Jeonju C constituency as the Democratic Party of Korea candidate, but lost to Chung Dong-young of the People's Party by 0.75% and 989 votes.

On November 7, 2017, Kim assumed the office of Chairman of the National Pension Service. Moon Jae-in and his cabinet were criticized by opposition parties such as the Liberty Korea Party and People's Party for revolving door politics. Except for being a member of the Health and Welfare Committee during the 19th session of the National Assembly, Kim had no experience regarding social security and social welfare. He resigned from his post on December 30, 2019, in order to prepare for the 2020 South Korean legislative election.

Kim once again ran for the Jeonju C constituency as the Democratic Party of Korea candidate, and defeated Chung Dong-young with 66.65% of the vote.

== Electoral history ==
Election	Year	Position	Party affiliation	Votes	Percentage of votes	Results
1998 South Korean local elections	1998	Member of the Jeonju City Council	Independent	1,387	47.84%	Lost (2nd)
2006 South Korean local elections	2006	Member of the North Jeolla Provincial Assembly	Uri Party	23,436	51.26%	Won
2010 South Korean local elections	2010	Member of the North Jeolla Provincial Assembly	Democratic Party	17,278	58.75%	Won
2012 South Korean legislative election	2012	Member of the National Assembly (Jeonju Deokjin, North Jeolla)	Democratic United Party	64,744	62.52%	Won
2016 South Korean legislative election	2016	Member of the National Assembly (Jeonju C, North Jeolla)	Democratic Party of Korea	60,673	46.96%	Lost (2nd)
2020 South Korean legislative election	2020	Member of the National Assembly (Jeonju C, North Jeolla)	Democratic Party of Korea	104,039	66.65%	Won

== See also ==
- National Pension Service
- List of members of the National Assembly (South Korea), 2020–2024
