= Chungju High School =

Coordinates: 36.96250°N 127.92951°E

- 충주고등학교
- Chungju, Chungbuk; South Korea

Information
- Type: Public
- Motto: 최고, 최선, 최대 (The Highest, The Utmost, The Best)
- Established: April 18, 1940
- Principal: Oh Jin Taek (오진택)
- Faculty: 87 (2009)
- Enrollment: 1,083 (2009)
- Mascot: Tiger
- Website: www.chungju.hs.kr

Chungju High School is a public secondary boys' school in Chungju-city, Chungcheongbuk-do, South Korea. It is located on 37 Yeseong Gil, (558 Hoam-dong). The 8th Secretary-General of the United Nations, Ban Ki-moon, graduated from the school.

== Motto ==
최고(最高), 최선(最善), 최대(最大) (The Highest, the Utmost, the Best)

This meaning of the motto is The Highest Goals, the Utmost Efforts, the Best Results

== Symbol ==
- Mascot : Tiger
- Tree : Maidenhair tree
- Flower : Korean Forsythia

== School event ==
- Mi-eul Festival (미을제)

Held in May each year.

== Notable alumni ==
- Ban Ki-moon - eighth Secretary-General of the United Nations
- Hong Soon-young - 28th Minister of Unification of South Korea
- Kim Ho-bok - fourth Mayor of Chungju City
- Lee Hyung-geun - ROK Army general and diplomat
- Lee In-young - politician
- Shin Kyung-rim - poet
- Yoo Jong-Ho - literary critic
- Lee Kyeong-yeong - actor.
