= Kim Yeon-chul =

South Korean political scientist (born 1964)

- 김연철

Minister of Unification
- In office 8 April 2019 – 19 June 2020
- President: Moon Jae-in
- Prime Minister: Lee Nak-yeon; Chung Sye-kyun
- Preceded by: Cho Myoung-gyon
- Succeeded by: Suh Ho (acting); Lee In-young

Personal details
- Born: 9 July 1964 (age 62) Donghae, South Korea
- Party: independent
- Education: Sungkyunkwan University

Kim Yeon-chul (Korean: 김연철; Hanja: 金鍊鐵; born 26 March 1964) is a South Korean associate professor of unification at Inje University who served as Minister of Unification under President Moon Jae-in from April 2019 to June 2020.

Before promoted to Minister, Kim was the president of the Korea Institute for National Unification, a government-funded research institute. He was previously a policy advisor to then-Minister of Unification Chung Dong-young from 2004 to 2006.

After completing his doctorate programme, he joined Samsung Economic Research Institute as its senior researcher. He was also the first president of The Hankyoreh's research institute on peace studies.

Kim holds three degrees in political science from Sungkyunkwan University from a bachelor to a doctorate.

Following North Korea's destruction of its Kaesong liaison office and a general worsening of inter-Korean relations, he offered to resign on June 17, 2020. On June 19, 2020, President Moon Jae-in officially accepted his resignation as the Minister of Unification.

In February 2025, Kim was sentenced to a suspended prison term of six months by the Seoul Central District Court for abuse of power involving the forced repatriation of two North Korean fishermen who had killed 16 of their colleagues in the Sea of Japan in 2019.
