= Kim Geun-tae =

South Korean politician (1947–2011)

- 김근태
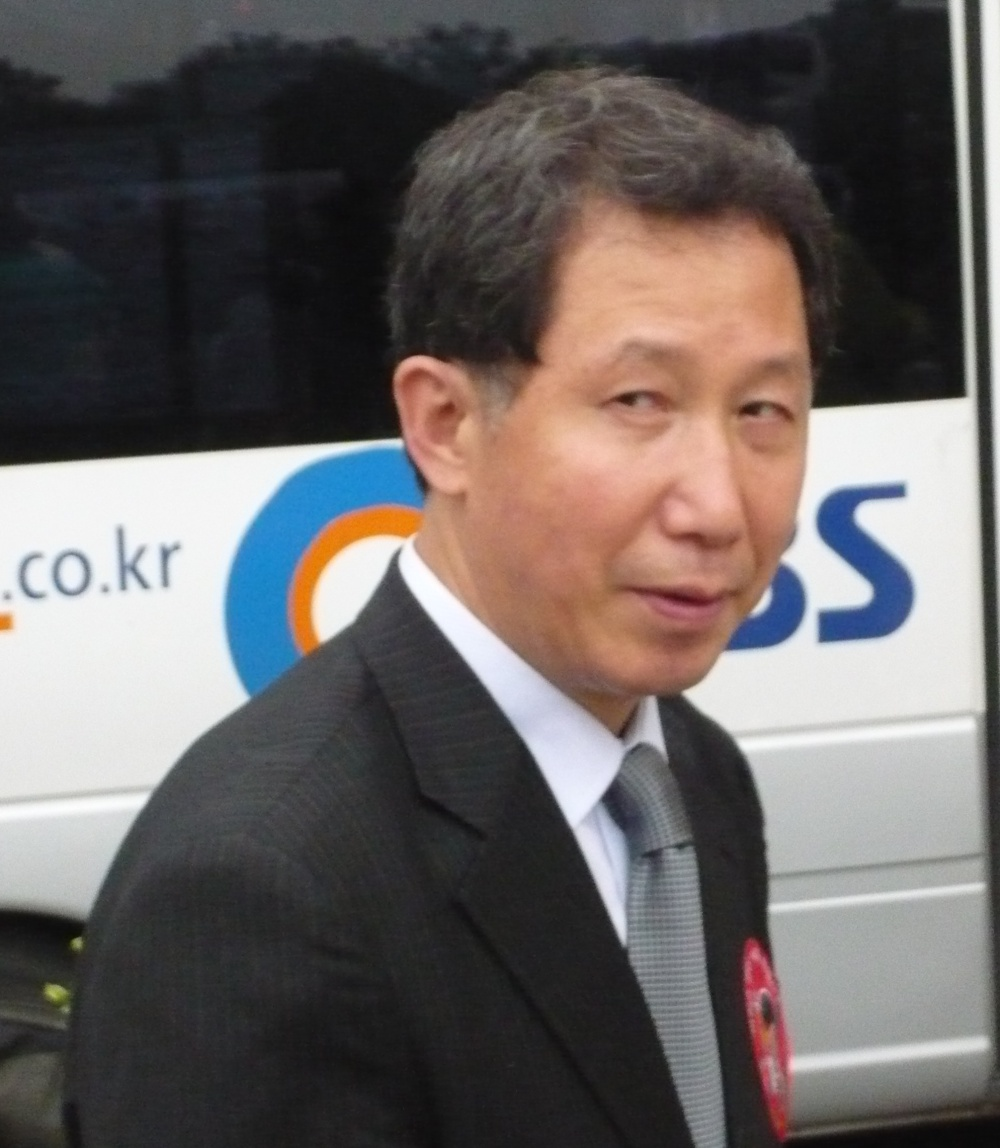
- Kim in 2008

Chairman of the Uri Party
- In office 9 June 2006 – 14 February 2007
- Preceded by: Chung Dong-young
- Succeeded by: Chung Sye-kyun

Member of the National Assembly
- In office 30 May 1996 – 29 May 2008
- Preceded by: Yoo Ihn-tae
- Succeeded by: Shin Ji-ho
- Constituency: Dobong A (Seoul)

Minister of Health and Welfare
- In office 1 July 2004 – 10 February 2006
- President: Roh Moo-hyun
- Prime Minister: Lee Hae-chan; Han Duck-soo (Acting)
- Preceded by: Kim Hwa-joong
- Succeeded by: Rhyu Si-min

Personal details
- Born: 14 February 1947 Bucheon, southern Korea
- Died: 30 December 2011 (aged 64) Seoul, South Korea
- Party: Democratic Party (1996–2003, 2007–2011); Uri Party (2003–2007)
- Spouse: In Jae-keun (m. 1947–2011)
- Education: Seoul National University
- Religion: Roman Catholic (Christian name : Zachary)

- Kim Geun-tae
- Hangul: 김근태
- Hanja: 金槿泰
- RR: Gim Geuntae
- MR: Kim Kŭnt'ae

Kim Geun-tae (Korean: 김근태; 14 February 1947 – 30 December 2011) was a South Korean democracy activist and politician.

== Life ==
Kim was born in Bucheon, Gyeonggi Province, southern Korea. He studied in Kyunggi High School and entered Seoul National University and majored economics. In college, he started demonstrating against the Yushin Regime of President Park Chung Hee and for democracy. He was arrested several times and served several years in prison. After serving a full sentence, Kim was freed.

Although Park Chung Hee was assassinated in 1979, the military dictatorship was succeeded by General Chun Doo-hwan in 1980. After Kim's release from prison, he began protesting against Chun's regime and founded the democracy activist group, Democratic Youth Coalition (민청련; 民靑聯) in 1983. In 1985, he was arrested for profiting North Korea (which was a frequent frame-up to the democracy movement by the military government) and tortured severely for 23 days by Lee Guen An, who was an inspector of the national police. In 1987, he shared the Robert F. Kennedy Human Rights Award with his wife In Jae-keun. The Award is given annually to those whose courageous activism is at the heart of the human rights movement and in the spirit of Robert F. Kennedy's vision and legacy.

He remembered the details of the torture and the identity of torturer, and revealed it during his trial. The government denied it at that time, but it was revealed as the truth after the democracy movement successfully forced the military regime into enacting democratic reforms. Lee Geun An, who tortured Kim, was wanted for the crime after the political situation reversed.

Kim was regarded as one of the most important activists in the democracy movement of the Republic of Korea and he went into politics on the recommendation of Kim Dae-jung in 1995. After Kim Dae-jung was elected the president of the Republic of Korea in 1997, Kim was one of candidates who could succeed Kim Dae-jung's presidency in the ruling party. Because of a low approval rating, he gave up the race for presidency halfway, and supported Roh Moo-hyun, who won the presidential election in 2002. During Roh's presidency, he was a former leader of the ruling Uri Party (now the Democratic United Party), and he served as Health and Welfare Minister from 2004 to 2006. He was also member of Parliament of the Republic of Korea from 1996 until 2008.

Although his political career seemed to go well, he suffered from severe PTSD. Because of this, he refused to go to doctors or dentists, which reminded him of being tortured. He was diagnosed with Parkinson's disease in 2006, which was thought to be due to the torture.

His condition got worse in 2010, deteriorating to the extent that he could not attend his daughter's wedding ceremony. He collapsed from a complication of his Parkinson's disease (a blood clot in the brain) in November 2011. Kim died on 30 December 2011. He was 64. He was buried in Moran Cemetery, Seongnam, where several notable democracy activists were buried.

== Election results ==
Year	Elections	Constituency	Political party	Votes (%)	Results
1996	15th National Assembly General Election	Dobong A (Seoul)	NCNP	27,768 (38.85%)	Won
2000	16th National Assembly General Election	Dobong A (Seoul)	MDP	34,233 (50.85%)	Won
2004	17th National Assembly General Election	Dobong A (Seoul)	Uri	42,583 (52.13%)	Won
2008	18th National Assembly General Election	Dobong A (Seoul)	UDP	31,335 (46.16%)	Defeated (2nd)

== In popular culture ==
He was played by actor Park Won-sang in the film National Security (2012).

Political offices
Preceded by Kim Hwa-hoong	Minister of Health and Welfare; 1 July 2004–10 February 2006	Succeeded by Rhyu Si-min
National Assembly of the Republic of Korea
Preceded by Yoo In-tae	Member of the National Assembly from Dobong A (Seoul); 30 May 1996–29 May 2008	Succeeded by Shin Ji-ho
Party political offices
Preceded by New Office	Floor Leader of the Uri Party; 27 October 2003–11 May 2004	Succeeded by Chun Jung-bae
Preceded by Chung Dong-young	Chairman of the Uri Party; 9 June 2006–14 February 2007	Succeeded by Chung Sye-kyun
