= Kim Tae-hyun =

Kim Tae-hyun may refer to:

- Kim Tae-hyeon (born 2000), South Korean footballer
- Kim Tae-hyun (footballer) (born 1996), South Korean footballer
- Kim Tae-hyun (politician) (born 1966), South Korean politician
- Kim Tae-hyun (weightlifter) (born 1969), South Korean weightlifter
