= Kim Yung-ho =

South Korean politician (born 1959)

- 김영호
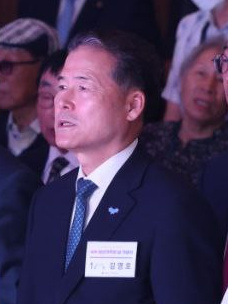
- Kim in 2024

Minister of Unification
- In office 7 July 2023 – 25 July 2025
- President: Yoon Suk Yeol; Lee Jae-myung
- Prime Minister: Han Duck-soo; Lee Ju-ho (acting); Kim Min-seok
- Preceded by: Kwon Young-se
- Succeeded by: Chung Dong-young

Personal details
- Born: 1 August 1959 (age 67) Dalseong, North Gyeongsang, South Korea
- Education: Seoul National University (BA); Boston University (MA); University of Virginia (PhD)

Kim Yung-ho (Korean: 김영호, born 1 August 1959) is a South Korean political and diplomatic scholar who served as the minister of unification from 2023 to 2025.

== Biography ==
Kim was born in the southeastern city of Jinju, South Gyeongsang Province. He majored in diplomacy at Seoul National University and received a doctorate from the University of Virginia in the United States. Kim also worked as a researcher at the Sejong Institute and began teaching political and diplomatic studies at Sungshin Women's University in Seoul in 1999.

In 2005, he became one of the most vocal scholars of the conservative New Right movement, holding advisory positions at the Ministry of Foreign Affairs, the Ministry of Veterans Affairs, and the Ministry of Unification.

He was appointed presidential secretary for unification during the conservative Lee Myung Bak presidency in 2011 and served as the human rights ambassador of the Ministry of Foreign Affairs from 2012 to 2013.

Kim has opened his YouTube channel in 2018, and he is presenting a column sharing his conservative views on world politics.

== Minister of Unification ==
Yonhap News Agency explained that he is considered the right person to understand and implement President Yoon Suk Yeol's North Korea policy stance centered on a "bold initiative" aimed at supporting North Korea's economic development in return for North Korea's denuclearization commitments.
