= Yoo Jae-geon =

South Korean politician (1937–2022)

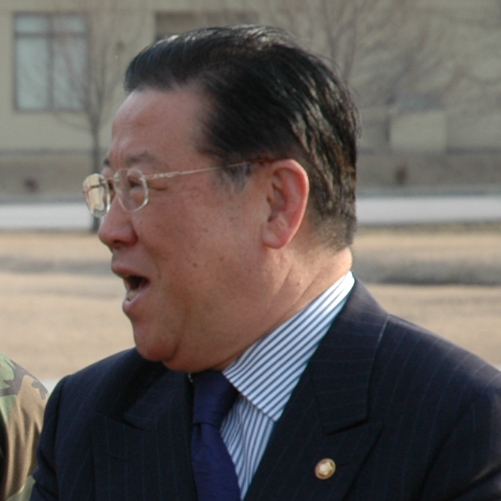

Member of the National Assembly of South Korea
- In office 30 May 1996 – 29 May 2008
- Preceded by: Lee Chul
- Succeeded by: Jung Tae-geun
- Constituency: Seongbuk A(Seoul)

Personal details
- Born: 19 September 1937 Keijō, Korea, Empire of Japan
- Died: 1 December 2022 (aged 85)
- Party: NCNP; MDP; Uri; GUDNP; AUP
- Education: Yonsei University; Brigham Young University; Washington State University; University of California, Davis

Yoo Jae-geon (Korean: 유재건; 19 September 1937 – 1 December 2022) was a South Korean politician. He had membership in multiple political parties and served in the National Assembly from 1996 to 2008.

Yoo died on 1 December 2022, at the age of 85.

== Election results ==
Year	Elections	Constituency	Political party	Votes (%)	Results
1996	15th National Assembly General Election	Seongbuk A (Seoul)	NCNP	39,159 (45.16%)	Won
2000	16th National Assembly General Election	Seongbuk A (Seoul)	MDP	44,845 (47.93%)	Won
2004	17th National Assembly General Election	Seongbuk A (Seoul)	Uri	44,531 (42.83%)	Won
