= Gyodong In clan =

Korean clan from Incheon

Gyodong In clan 교동인씨(喬桐 印氏)
- Country: Korea
- Current region: Gyodong-myeon, Ganghwa County
- Founder: In Seo
- Connected members: In Gyo-jin; In Jae-keun

Gyodong In clan (Korean: 교동 인씨; Hanja: 喬桐 印氏) was one of the Korean clans. Their Bon-gwan is in Ganghwa County, Incheon. According to the research in 2015, the number of Gyodong In clan was 20,737 people. Their founder was In Seo who was an Adjunct (Hanja: 馮翊) in Jin dynasty, China. He was dispatched to Silla as an embassy. After that, he was naturalized to Silla.

== Clan residences ==
The Gyodong In clan is reported to have a couple of villages (집성촌) where the members are made up of mostly people from the Gyodong In clan, these areas include/included:

- Yeomul-ri, Yi-an Myeon, Sangju, Gyeongsangbukdo
- Guhyang-ri, Hamchang-Eup, Sangju, Gyeongsangbukdo
- Daga-dong, Dongnam-Gu, Daejeon
- Songhak-ri, Myeoncheon-Myeon, Dangjin, Chungcheongnamdo
- Samhwa-ri, Seokmun-Myeon, Dangjin, Chungcheongnamdo
- Naksang-ri, Deoksan-Myeon, Yesan, Chungcheongnamdo
- Yongdong-ri, Sapgyo-Eub, Yesan, Chungcheongnamdo
- Jangsan-ri, Munsan-Eup, Paju, Gyeonggido
- Daechon-ri (Formerly Noktan-ri of Sangwol-Myeon), Pyeongsan, North Hwanghae Province
- Nampo-Ri (Formerly and still recorded as Changreung-ri in genealogy books), Nam-Myeon, Kaepoong, Gyeonggido

== See also ==
- Korean clan names of foreign origin
