= Dobong A =

Constituency in Seoul, South Korea

- Single-member constituency for the National Assembly
- Location of the constituency
- District(s): Dobong District (part)
- Region: Seoul
- Electorate: 136,836 (2024)

Current constituency
- Created: 1988
- Seats: 1
- Party: People Power
- Member: Kim Jae-sub
- Created from: Dobong

Dobong A (Korean: 도봉구 갑) is a constituency of the National Assembly of South Korea. The constituency consists of parts of Dobong District, Seoul. As of 2024, 136,836 eligible voters were registered in the constituency. The constituency was created in 1988 from the Dobong constituency.

== History ==
Since its establishment, Dobong A has more often voted for centre-left, liberal parties to represent the constituency and is thus considered a stronghold for the Democratic Party.

Shin Oh-chul of the right-wing New Democratic Republican Party was the first member to represent the constituency, having won with only 33.27% of the vote. Shin unsuccessfully ran for re-election and was succeeded Yoo Ihn-tae of the centre-left Democratic Party. In the following election held in 1996, Kim Geun-tae of the centrist liberal National Congress for New Politics won the seat with 38.85% of the vote, narrowly beating out Yang Kyung-ja of the centre-right Grand National Party. Kim won re-election in 2000 and 2004 and went on to serve as Minister of Health and Welfare under President Roh Moo-hyun. Kim narrowly lost re-election in 2008 to Shin Ji-ho of the Grand National Party. Shin was not re-nominated for the 2012 election, after losing to Yoo Kyung-hee in the Saenuri Party's primary for the constituency. In the general election, Yoo Kyung-hee faced In Jae-keun, the spouse of former representative Kim Geun-tae who had died in 2011. In Jae-keun emerged victorious, securing 58.46% of the vote. In won re-election in 2016 and 2020, garnering 60.1% and 54.2% of the vote respectively.

Ahead of the 2024 South Korean legislative election, incumbent In Jae-keun announced that she would not be standing for re-election in Dobong A. Despite the constituency's historical preference for candidates from the Democratic Party and predecessor parties, Ahn narrowly lost to Kim Jae-sub of the conservative People Power Party. Kim Jae-sub was one of only three People Power Party candidates to win in Seoul constituencies north of the Han River.

== Boundaries ==
The constituency encompasses the neighborhoods of Ssangmun 1-dong, Ssangmun 3-dong, and Chang-dong. It is bordered by Dobong B to the north, Gangbuk A to the south and west, Nowon A to the east, and Nowon B to the northeast.

== List of members of the National Assembly ==
Election	Member	Party	Dates	Notes
1988	Shin Oh-chul	New Democratic Republican	1988–1992	
1992	Yoo Ihn-tae	Democratic	1992–1996	Senior Secretary for Political Affairs (2003–2004); Secretary-General of the National Assembly (2018–2020)
1996	Kim Geun-tae	National Congress	1996–2008	Minister of Health and Welfare (2004–2006)
2000	Kim Geun-tae	Millennium Democratic	1996–2008	Minister of Health and Welfare (2004–2006)
2004	Kim Geun-tae	Uri	1996–2008	Minister of Health and Welfare (2004–2006)
2008	Shin Ji-ho	Grand National	2008–2012	
2012	In Jae-keun	Democratic United	2012–2024	Spouse of Kim Geun-tae
2016	In Jae-keun	Democratic	2012–2024	Spouse of Kim Geun-tae
2020	In Jae-keun	Democratic	2012–2024	Spouse of Kim Geun-tae
2024	Kim Jae-sub	People Power	2024–present	

== Election results ==
=== 2024 ===
Legislative Election 2024: Dobong A
Party	Candidate	Votes	%	±%
People Power	Kim Jae-sub	46,374	49.05	▲8.56
Democratic	Ahn Gwi-ryeong	45,276	47.89	▼6.13
Green Justice	Yoon Oh	2,882	3.04	▼1.84
Rejected ballots		905	–	
Turnout		95,398	69.72	▲4.03
Registered electors		136,836		
People Power gain from Democratic		Swing		

=== 2020 ===
Legislative Election 2020: Dobong A
Party	Candidate	Votes	%	±%
Democratic	In Jae-keun	50,603	54.02	▼6.08
United Future	Kim Jae-sub	37,967	40.49	▲0.59
Justice	Yoon Oh	4,577	4.88	new
National Revolutionary	Park Young-chan	554	0.59	new
Rejected ballots		950	–	
Turnout		93,701	65.69	▲6.42
Registered electors		142,625		
Democratic hold		Swing		

=== 2016 ===
Legislative Election 2016: Dobong A
Party	Candidate	Votes	%	±%
Democratic	In Jae-keun	49,780	60.10	▲1.64
Saenuri	Lee Jae-bum	33,050	39.90	▼0.23
Rejected ballots		1,831	–	
Turnout		84,661	59.27	▲3.98
Registered electors		142,823		
Democratic hold		Swing		

=== 2012 ===
Legislative Election 2012: Dobong A
Party	Candidate	Votes	%	±%
Democratic United	In Jae-keun	45,682	58.46	▲12.3
Saenuri	Yoo Kyung-hee	31,361	40.13	▼7.91
Real Democratic	Park Chun-yup	1,094	1.40	new
Rejected ballots		507	–	
Turnout		78,644	55.29	▲6.91
Registered electors		142,229		
Democratic United gain from Saenuri		Swing		

=== 2008 ===
Legislative Election 2008: Dobong A
Party	Candidate	Votes	%	±%
Grand National	Shin Ji-ho	32,613	48.04	▲10.66
United Democratic	Kim Geun-tae	31,335	46.16	new
Democratic Labor	Kim Seung-kyo	2,347	3.45	▼1.4
Independent	Hong Woo-cheol	951	1.40	new
Family Party for Peace and Unity	Lee Hyun-jae	603	0.92	new
Rejected ballots		406	–	
Turnout		68,282	48.38	▼14.17
Registered electors		141,137		
Grand National gain from United Democratic		Swing		

=== 2004 ===
Legislative Election 2004: Dobong A
Party	Candidate	Votes	%	±%
Uri	Kim Geun-tae	42,583	52.13	new
Grand National	Yang Kyung-ja	30,538	37.38	▼4.63
Millennium Democratic	Lee Kyung-tae	4,596	5.62	▼45.23
Democratic Labor	Hong Woo-cheol	3,967	4.85	new
Rejected ballots		641	–	
Turnout		82,325	62.55	▲7.82
Registered electors		131,619		
Uri hold		Swing		

=== 2000 ===
Legislative Election 2000: Dobong A
Party	Candidate	Votes	%	±%
Millennium Democratic	Kim Geun-tae	34,233	50.85	new
Grand National	Yang Kyung-ja	28,279	42.01	▲6.69
United Liberal Democrats	Lee Hee-sun	2,464	3.66	▼10.16
Youth Progressive	Jeon Jin	2,334	3.46	new
Rejected ballots		511	–	
Turnout		67,821	54.73	▼6.19
Registered electors		123,917		
Millennium Democratic hold		Swing		

=== 1996 ===
Legislative Election 1996: Dobong A
Party	Candidate	Votes	%	±%
National Congress	Kim Geun-tae	27,768	38.85	new
New Korea	Yang Kyung-ja	22,923	35.32	▲3.5
United Liberal Democrats	Shin Oh-chul	9,884	13.82	new
Democratic	Ahn Pyung-su	7,396	10.34	new
Independent	Cho Su-hwi	1,176	1.64	new
Rejected ballots		1,109	–	
Turnout		72,578	60.92	▼6.85
Registered electors		119,140		
National Congress gain from Democratic		Swing		

=== 1992 ===
Legislative Election 1992: Dobong A
Party	Candidate	Votes	%	±%
Democratic	Yoo Ihn-tae	48,603	40.88	new
Democratic Liberal	Shin Oh-chul	27,838	31.82	new
Unification National	Han Ho-sang	23,766	19.98	new
Independent	Cho Sung-kuk	3,216	2.70	new
New Political Reform	Yoon Eung-soon	2,670	2.24	new
Independent	Kim Jong-yoon	1,631	1.37	new
Independent	Park Young-chul	1,166	0.98	new
Rejected ballots		1,159	–	
Turnout		120,049	67.77	▼1.01
Registered electors		177,153		
Democratic gain from Democratic Liberal		Swing		

=== 1988 ===
Legislative Election 1988: Dobong A
Party	Candidate	Votes	%	±%
New Democratic Republican	Shin Oh-chul	39,873	33.27	–
Democratic Justice	Chang Cheon-seok	23,183	19.34	–
Peace Democratic	Han Ho-sang	22,532	18.80	–
Hankyoreh Democratic	Cho Soon-hyung	17,817	14.86	–
Reunification Democratic	Park Jung-tae	16,436	13.71	–
Rejected ballots		854	–	
Turnout		120,695	68.78	–
Registered electors		175,484		
New Democratic Republican win (new seat)				

== See also ==
- List of constituencies of the National Assembly of South Korea
