= Chung Dong-young =

South Korean politician (born 1953)

- 정동영
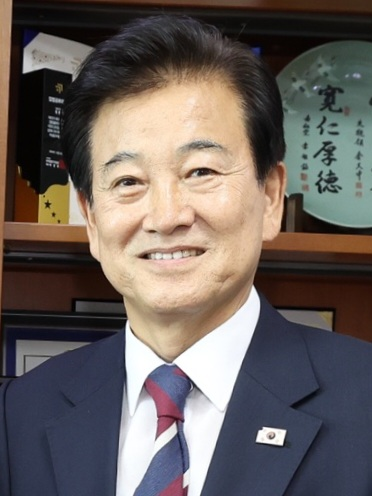
- Chung in 2025

Minister of Unification
- Incumbent
- Assumed office 25 July 2025
- President: Lee Jae Myung
- Prime Minister: Kim Min-seok; Han Seong-sook
- Preceded by: Kim Yung-ho
- In office 1 July 2004 – 30 December 2005
- President: Roh Moo-hyun
- Prime Minister: Lee Hae-chan
- Preceded by: Lee Jong-seok
- Succeeded by: Jeong Se-hyun

Leader of the Party for Democracy and Peace
- In office 5 August 2018 – 24 February 2020
- Preceded by: Cho Bae-sook
- Succeeded by: Office abolished

Member of the National Assembly
- Incumbent
- Assumed office 30 May 2024
- Preceded by: Kim Sung-joo
- Constituency: Jeonju C (North Jeolla)
- In office 30 May 2016 – 29 May 2020
- Preceded by: Kim Sung-joo (Jeonju Deokjin, North Jeolla)
- Succeeded by: Kim Sung-joo
- Constituency: Jeonju C (North Jeolla)
- In office 30 April 2009 – 29 May 2012
- Preceded by: Kim Sae-woong
- Succeeded by: Kim Sung-joo
- Constituency: Jeonju Deokjin (North Jeolla)
- In office 30 May 1996 – 29 May 2004
- Preceded by: Oh Tan (Jeonju B, North Jeolla)
- Succeeded by: Chae Su-chan
- Constituency: Jeonju Deokjin (North Jeolla)

Chairman of the Uri Party
- In office 18 February 2006 – 9 June 2006
- Preceded by: Moon Hee-sang; Chung Sye-kyun (Interim); Yoo Jae-geon (Interim)
- Succeeded by: Kim Geun-tae
- In office 11 January 2004 – 17 May 2004
- Preceded by: Kim Won-gi
- Succeeded by: Shin Gi-nam

Personal details
- Born: Chung Dong-young; 27 July 1953 (age 73) Sunchang County, North Jeolla Province, South Korea
- Party: Democratic Party of Korea
- Education: Seoul National University; University of Wales
- Occupation: Politician

Korean name
- Hangul: 정동영
- Hanja: 鄭東泳
- RR: Jeong Dongyeong
- MR: Chŏng Tongyŏng

Chung Dong-young (Korean: 정동영; born 27 July 1953) is a South Korean politician who has served as the Minister of unification since late July 2025.

A member of the Democratic Party of Korea (DPK), he was the nominee of the United New Democratic Party in the 2007 South Korean presidential election and previously served as the unification minister from 2004 to 2006.

== Early life and career ==
He was born in Sunchang County, North Jeolla Province, South Korea on 27 July 1953. He has a bachelor's degree in Korean History from Seoul National University (1979) and master's from the University of Wales, and before entering politics, he was a journalist and anchor at the Politics Section of the Munhwa Broadcasting Corporation. He served as an anchor at MBC Newsdesk from the late 1980s and early 1990s. Chung is a Roman Catholic.

== Political career ==
From 1996 to 2004, he served two terms in the National Assembly with the National Congress for New Politics and the Millennium Democratic Party, respectively; has twice been chairman of the Uri Party; and was considered a strong contender to succeed Roh Moo-hyun as president.

=== Minister of Unification (2004–2006) ===
From April 2004 until December 2005, Chung was the South Korean Minister of Unification. During his tenure as Unification Minister, Chung was a strong supporter of the Sunshine Policy. One of his uncontroversial achievements is the foundation of Kaesong Industrial Complex, which is an exclusive industrial zone set up on the southernmost province of North Korea, Keasong. The establishment of the complex, by allowing South Korean small and middle sized companies hiring cheap labors from North Korea brought synergetic effect on the South Korean economy. The complex is now reputed to have promoted peace on the Korean peninsula and to have served as "the bastion of peace" whenever the North and South relationship is strained. Some people criticize that he has not taken a tougher stance on North Korea, and that he had rhetorical clashes with the United States that helped weaken relations between the two countries. He was once accused of attempting to distract reporters from a meeting of activists for human rights in North Korea. However, some of the criticisms are biased by the one-sided political perspective from the people who support the hard-line approach to North Korea. The contention that he had impeded on the relationship between South Korea and the United States can be counter proven by the process he had made the Keasong Complex realized. The Keasong Complex could not have been made possible unless the then Bush administration had authorized the approval of foreign materials flowing into North Korea. The realization of the complex in the middle of hawk driven period of "axis of evil" can only be correctly explained by the quick and wide approach by the then Unification Ministry and the minister Chung to convince the US government and the Korean counterpart.

In March 2007, while visiting the North Korean town of Kaesong where South Korean companies are set up, he proposed that an inter-Korean summit be organized there. However, since he had lost the presidential election that year, under the Lee Myung-bak government it never materialized.

=== 2007 presidential campaign ===
On October 15, 2007, the United New Democratic Party announced that Chung won about 44 percent of the votes in the party primary, beating two other candidates, to become the party's candidate for the presidential elections that year.

Chung, however, lost the elections to the opposition's Grand National Party candidate Lee Myung-bak by the widest margin since direct elections began in 1987. The loss was attributed primarily to the people's disappointment of the economic situation and its dealings and continuous political strife under the Roh Mu-hyun government as well as the unsuccessful campaign strategies that overly relied on criticizing the other candidate, Lee Myung-bak. The issue of the presidential election in 2007 was predominantly about determining truth of the implication of the presidential candidate Lee Myung bak in the allegation of the investment advisory firm BBK ltd. which had then been accused of large scale stock price manipulation that hurt thousands of individual investors. The primary issue was to prove that he was the real owner of the company.

Lee strongly denied the claim even though there have been plenty of evidence he was at least closely related to the heads of the company and even there was a video tape showing he claiming himself to be the owner of the company. However, any hearings or legal trials of the case had not realized during the presidential election period and obviously after Lee become the president the case lost its force despite the wide public attention to it. Let alone the case, Lee Myung-bak was previously committed fourteen different cases of violations or crimes. However, the widespread perception of the people that the new president has to be the one who can efficiently control the economy has given him the strong edge over the opponent candidate. Evidently, the legitimacy of the president was an issue from the perspective of Chung and Chung's party. He stated that should the turnout for the presidential elections be under 50% that the legitimacy of the result may be an issue. However, the voter turnout was 62.9%.

Earlier, Chung also criticized opposition leader Park Geun-hye of the Grand National Party that they exploited the event to make an image that she is a victim to emotionally move the voters by immediately campaigning during that party's primaries after her recovery from an attack by a man who slashed her face with a small knife. Later, he attributed the downfall of his party in the poll to the attack. Predictably, the Uri Party suffered a major defeat in the elections in which the opposition Grand National Party took 13 of the 16 provinces and major cities.

=== Minister of Unification (2025–) ===
On 23 June 2025, South Korea President Lee Jae-Myung nominated Chung to once again be unification minister.

On 25 September 2025, Chung said that "North and South are, in fact, two states — already two states, even in international legal terms", though he said that "acknowledging North Korea's statehood does not mean permanent division". On 25 March 2026, Chung referred to the North Korea–South Korea relations as hanjo gwangye (한조관계; Hanguk-Chosŏn relations) instead of the traditional term "North-South relations". He also referred to North Korea by its official name, the Democratic People's Republic of Korea, the first time a senior South Korean government official had used North Korea's official state name.

== Election results ==
Year	Elections	Constituency	Political party	Votes (%)	Results
1996	15th National Assembly General Election	Jeonju Deokjin (North Jeolla)	NCNP	97,858 (89.92%)	Won
2000	16th National Assembly General Election	Jeonju Deokjin (North Jeolla)	MDP	98,746 (88.24%)	Won
2004	17th National Assembly General Election	Proportional representation (22nd)	Uri	-	Resigned
2000	2007 Presidential Election	South Korea	GUDNP	6,174,681 (26.14%)	Defeated (2nd)
2008	18th National Assembly General Election	Dongjak B (Seoul)	UDP	36,251 (41.50%)	Defeated (2nd)
2009	2009 By-election	Jeonju Deokjin (North Jeolla)	Independent	57,423 (72.27%)	Won
2012	19th National Assembly General Election	Gangnam B (Seoul)	DUP	48,419 (39.26%)	Defeated (2nd)
2015	2015 By-election	Gwanak B (Seoul)	Independent	15,569 (20.15%)	Defeated (3rd)
2016	20th National Assembly General Election	Jeonju C (North Jeolla)	People's	61,662 (47.72%)	Won
2020	21st National Assembly General Election	Jeonju C (North Jeolla)	Minsaeng	50,022 (32.04%)	Defeated (2nd)
2024	22nd National Assembly General Election	Jeonju C (North Jeolla)	Democratic	117,407 (82.08%)	Won

== See also ==
- Division of Korea
- Politics of South Korea
- 2007 South Korean presidential election

== Notes ==
Political offices
Preceded by Jeong Se-hyun	Unification Minister of South Korea; 1 June 2004–30 December 2005	Succeeded by Lee Jong-seok
Preceded by Jeong Se-hyun	Chairman of the National Security Council; 1 June 2004–30 December 2005	Succeeded by Lee Jong-seok
Preceded by Kim Yung-ho	Unification Minister of South Korea; 25 July 2025–	Succeeded by
National Assembly of the Republic of Korea
Preceded by Oh Tan (Jeonju City B, North Jeolla)	Member of the National Assembly from Jeonju City Deokjin District (North Jeolla); 30 May 1996–29 May 2004	Succeeded by Chae Su-chan
Preceded by Kim Sae-woong	Member of the National Assembly from Jeonju City Deokjin District (North Jeolla); 30 April 2009–29 May 2012	Succeeded by Kim Sung-joo
Preceded by Kim Sung-joo (Jeonju City Deokjin District, North Jeolla)	Member of the National Assembly from Jeonju City C (North Jeolla); 30 May 2016–29 May 2020	Succeeded by Kim Sung-joo
Preceded by Kim Sung-joo	Member of the National Assembly from Jeonju City C (North Jeolla); 30 May 2024–	Succeeded by
Party political offices
Preceded by Kim Won-ki; Moon Hee-sang; Chung Sye-kyun (interim); Yoo Jae-geon (Interim)	Chairman of the Uri Party; 11 January 2004–17 May 2004; 18 February 2006–9 June 2006	Succeeded by Shin Ki-nam; Kim Geun-tae
Preceded by Cho Bae-sook	Leader of the Party for Democracy and Peace; 5 August, 2018–24 February, 2020	Succeeded by Office abolished
Preceded by Roh Moo-hyun	Grand Unified Democratic New Party nominee for President of South Korea; 2007	Succeeded by Moon Jae-in
