= Aphae Jung clan =

Korean clan from South Jeolla Province

Aphae Jeong clan
- Country: Korea
- Current region: Sinan County, South Jeolla
- Founder: Chŏng Toksŏng
- Connected members: Jeong Se-hyun; Chung Sye-kyun; Jung Hae-in; Jung Il-woo; Jung Eun-bi; Jung Whee-in
- Website: www.aphaejeong.or.kr

Aphae Jung clan (Korean: 압해 정씨; Hanja: 押海 丁氏) is a Korean clan. It was one of the most recognized noble families in the late Joseon Dynasty, but was kicked out of the government by the royal family as it became involved in the Catholic Persecution of 1801. Their Bon-gwan is in Sinan County, South Jeolla, South Jeolla Province. Their founder was Chŏng Toksŏng. According to the clan, he was originally a chancellor from the Tang dynasty but exiled to Aphae Island in 853 during the reign of Emperor Xuanzong of Tang. Although he was pardoned, he refused to return to China and stayed in Korea. There are Aphae Jung clan villages in Naju, Shinan, Changwon and Yeonggwang. Famous figures from this family include Chŏng Yagyong, Jeong Yak-jeon, and Jung Hae-in. According to the 1985 South Korean census, there were 55,893 members of the Aphae Jung clan, from 12,688 households.

== See also ==
- Korean clan names of foreign origin
