= Ahn Gwi-ryeong =

South Korean politician (born 1989)

- 안귀령
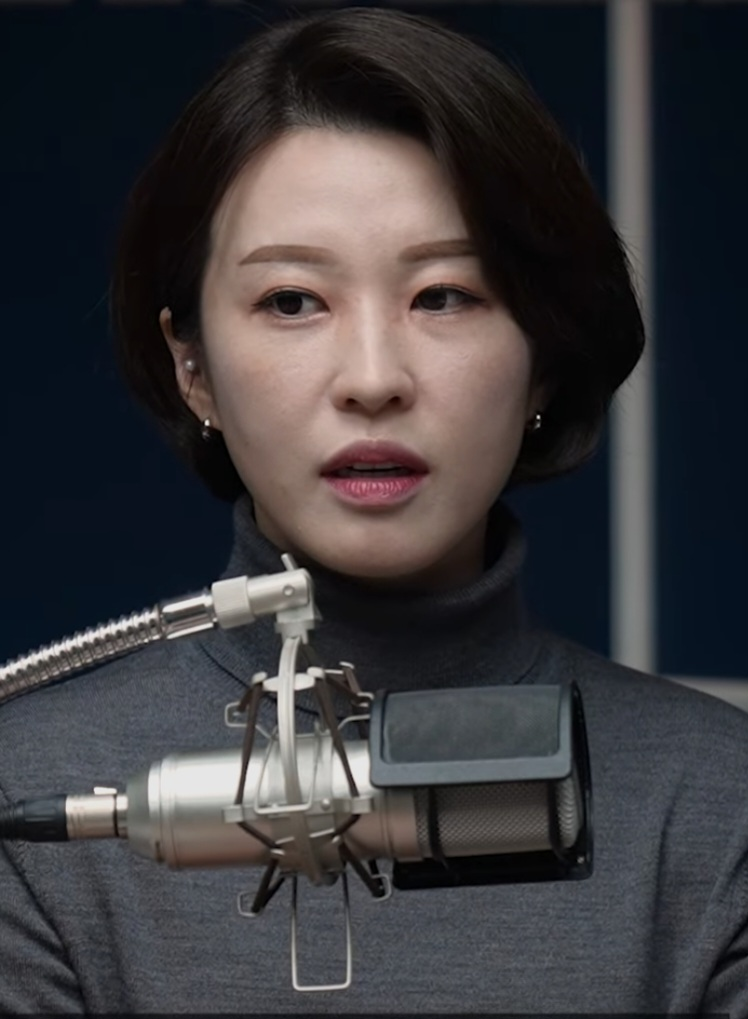
- Ahn Gwi-ryeong in 2023

Chairperson of the Seoul Dobong District 1 Regional Committee
- Incumbent
- Assumed office February 2024
- Preceded by: In Jae-keun

Personal details
- Born: June 1, 1989 (age 37) Gyeongju, South Korea
- Party: Democratic Party of Korea
- Education: Ewha Womans University (BA)
- Occupation: Journalist, Politician
- Website: Instagram

Korean name
- Hangul: 안귀령
- RR: An Gwiryeong
- MR: An Kwiryŏng

Ahn Gwi-ryeong (Korean: 안귀령; born June 1, 1989) is a South Korean politician and former news anchor for the Korean broadcasting company YTN. She transitioned into politics and ran in the 2024 South Korean legislative election as the candidate for the Korean Democratic Party in the Dobong A constituency but was defeated. She is currently serving as the Deputy Spokesperson of the Democratic Party.

During the 2024 South Korean martial law crisis, Ahn Gwi-ryeong was photographed & filmed confronting and attempting to wrestle a service rifle from a martial law soldier during the protest against President Yoon Suk Yeol's effort to blockade the National Assembly. She subsequently participated in the impeachment movement against President Yoon.

== Career ==
Ahn Gwi-ryeong began her career as an announcer at Gwangju Broadcasting in 2014 before joining YTN as an announcer in April 2016. In January 2022, she resigned from YTN and transitioned into politics, joining the election campaign committee of Lee Jae-myung, the presidential candidate of the Democratic Party of Korea, where she served as a spokesperson.

In the 2024 South Korean legislative election, Ahn received a strategic nomination to run in the Seoul Dobong District 1 constituency. However, she was defeated, securing 47.89% of the vote and finishing in second place.

On January 18, 2024, the broadcasting journalists' unions for JTBC and the National Union of Media Workers released a public statement criticizing Ahn and Lee Jeong-heon for leaving journalism to join the Democratic Party. The statement argued that such actions constituted a breach of professional ethics.

Ahead of the 2024 South Korean legislative election, incumbent In Jae-keun announced that she would not be running for re-election in the Dobong A constituency.

Despite the constituency's historical preference for Democratic Party candidates and its predecessor parties, Ahn narrowly lost to Kim Jae-sub of the conservative People Power Party.

Kim's victory was notable, as he was one of only three People Power Party candidates to win in Seoul constituencies north of the Han River.

In November 2024, Ahn Gwi-ryeong was fined 700,000 Korean won for violating the Public Official Election Act.

During the declaration of martial law in 2024, Ahn Gwi-ryeong arrived at the National Assembly building around 23:00. She was later seen trying to seize an assault rifle from a soldier before the latter pointed it at her briefly, prompting her to berate the soldier, saying "Aren't you ashamed?" as he walked away. However, individual soldiers were not issued live ammunition, with many of the soldiers utilizing non-lethal simulation training rounds. She later told BBC Korean Service that "I didn't think… I just knew we had to stop this." The video was captured by a live stream by online newscaster OhmyNews. Shortly afterward, the clip received 1.2 million views on YouTube. The video then went viral online. She told Reuters: "I think that the people have already psychologically impeached President Yoon Suk Yeol," Ahn said. "Who could trust a president declaring martial law almost like a child playing games or entrust the nation to such leadership?" A still from the video the incident was selected by the BBC as one of the most striking images of 2024. The BBC compared one still of the video to a painting of Joan of Arc by artist John Gilbert. In early 2025, videos surfaced showing additional scenes of the struggle. In one particular scene, she is seen struggling with a soldier, attempting to seize control of his rifle. Another soldier is seen to then attempt to defuse the situation, by removing her hands grabbing the sling of the rifle. Despite this, she immediately grabbed the sling again, a move that garnered criticism for unnecessarily escalating the situation. Later in 2025, Ahn filed a police defamation complaint against Commander Kim Hyun-tae of the 707th Special Missions Group, Republic of Korea Special Forces, as he testified that the situation in which she had struggled with the soldier's rifle in the famous image had been artificial. Commander Kim was responsible for leading the 707th into the National Assembly during the martial law crisis, and testified under oath as a witness in the trial of former Defense Minister Kim Yong-hyun, stating, “The soldiers said that Ahn brought along large bodyguards and even prepared makeup right before filming. The soldiers felt very wronged about that.” Ahn's legal representative responded that, “Due to former Commander Kim’s remarks, Ahn has been portrayed as a politician who ‘politically exploited the insurrection situation’ or a person who ‘deceived the public,’” adding, “Her social reputation and honor, built as a journalist and spokesperson, have been severely damaged.”

== Election results ==
| Year | Elections | Constituency | Political party | Votes (%) | Results |
|---|---|---|---|---|---|
| 2024 | 22nd National Assembly General Election | Dobong A (Seoul) | Democratic | 45,276 (47.89%) | Defeated (2nd) |
