= In Jae-keun =

South Korean politician (born 1953)

- 인재근
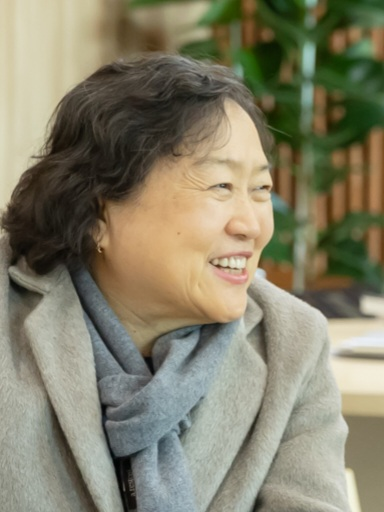

Member of the National Assembly
- In office 30 May 2012 – 29 May 2024
- Preceded by: Shin Ji-ho
- Succeeded by: Kim Jae-sub
- Constituency: Dobong A (Seoul)

Personal details
- Born: 11 November 1953 Gyeonggi Province, South Korea
- Party: Minjoo Party of Korea
- Spouse: Kim Geun-tae (m. 1947–2011)
- Education: Ewha Womans University
- Occupation: politician, activist
- Religion: Roman Catholic (Christian name : Elizabeth)

- Korean name
- Hangul: 인재근
- Hanja: 印在謹
- RR: In Jaegeun
- MR: In Chaegŭn

In Jae-keun (Korean: 인재근; born 11 November 1953) is a South Korean politician and democracy activist. In 1985, her husband Kim Geun-tae was arrested and tortured by the government of Chun Doo-hwan for his pro-democracy activism. In 1987, In was awarded the Robert F. Kennedy Human Rights Award along with her husband for her role in publicly exposing his detention and torture. After Kim's death, she was elected as member of national assembly for Dobong A, Seoul in 2012. Dobong A was Kim's constituency from 1996 to 2008.

== Election results ==
Year	Elections	Constituency	Political party	Votes (%)	Results
2012	19th National Assembly General Election	Dobong A (Seoul)	DUP	45,682 (58.46%)	Won
2016	20th National Assembly General Election	Dobong A (Seoul)	Democratic	49,780 (60.10%)	Won
2020	21st National Assembly General Election	Dobong A (Seoul)	Democratic	50,653 (54.02%)	Won
