= Kim Young-bae (politician, born 1967) =

South Korean politician (born 1967)

- 김영배
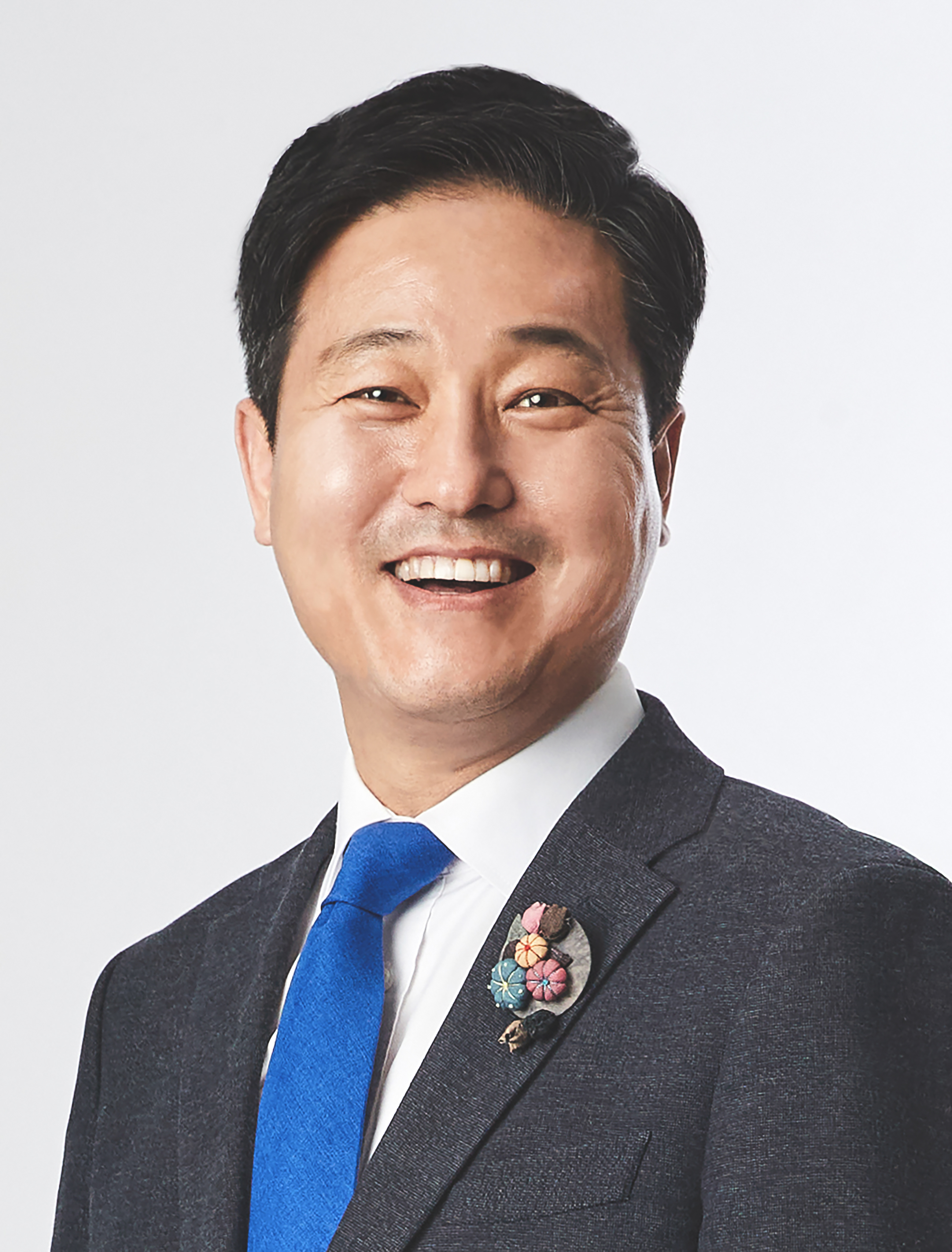
- Kim Young-bae

Member of the National Assembly
- Incumbent
- Assumed office 30 May 2020
- Preceded by: You Seung-hee
- Constituency: Seongbuk A (Seoul)

Mayor of Seongbuk
- In office 1 July 2010 – 30 June 2018
- Preceded by: Suh Chan-kyo
- Succeeded by: Lee Seung-ro

Personal details
- Born: 8 March 1967 (age 59) Busan, South Korea
- Party: Democratic
- Other political affiliations: UDP (2008); Democratic (2008–2011); DUP (2011–2013); Democratic (2013–2014); NPAD (2014–2015)
- Spouse: Lee Ji-hyun
- Children: 2
- Education: Korea University; Syracuse University
- Occupation: Activist, politician

Kim Young-bae (Korean: 김영배, born 8 March 1967) is a South Korean politician and activist who served as the Mayor of Seongbuk from 2010 to 2018. In 2020 he was elected to the National Assembly for Seongbuk A constituency.

== Political career ==
He joined politics during the 1995 local elections, when he contributed the election of Chin Young-ho as the Mayor of Seongbuk. He then served as the secretary to Chin until 2001; he was the youngest secretary to district mayors during that time.

In the 2002 presidential election, Kim worked close to the Millennium Democratic Party (MDP) candidate Roh Moo-hyun, who was later elected the new President of the Republic. He became an aide to Shin Kye-ryoon, who served as the Chief Secretary of the presidential transition team. After Roh took an oath as the President, Kim became an administrator, as well as a secretary of the Office of the President. In 2007, he projected the inter-Korean summit between Roh Moo-hyun and Kim Jong Il.

Prior to the 2008 election, Kim contested UDP preselection for Seongbuk 1st constituency but lost to Son Pong-suk. He instead contested as the Mayor of Seongbuk in the 2010 local elections, and defeated the incumbent Suh Chan-kyo. He was re-elected in 2014, defeating Kim Kyu-sung. He did not contest in 2018. He returned to the Blue House as the Secretary for Policy Coordination on 6 August 2018, despite his early denial. He was later promoted to the Secretary to the President for Civil Affairs on 21 January 2019.

In the 2020 election, Kim contested Democratic preselection for Seongbuk 1st constituency, and defeated the then incumbent MP You Seung-hee. However, You did not concede his defeat, and filed a lawsuit against Kim's 3 campaign members for breaching the Public Official Election Act. Nevertheless, Kim was confirmed as the Democratic candidate for Seongbuk 1st on 12 March. On 15 April, Kim successfully defeated the UFP candidate Han Sang-hak. He received 60.90%, the highest vote among the newly elected Democratic candidates in Seoul.

Following the landslide defeat of the Democratic Party in the 2021 by-elections, the party leadership was subsequently collapsed. As the incident provoked the leadership by-election, Kim announced his intention to run as one of five elected members of its Supreme Council on 15 April 2021, exactly after a year of his election as an MP. On 2 May, he received 13.46% and was elected as the 4th out of 5 vice presidents-elected. Only Jun Hye-sook came behind of Kim.

== Education ==
Kim attended Peniel High School before entering to Korea University, where he served as the President of the Student Council of College of Political Science and Economics. He obtained a bachelor's degree and a doctorate in political science and diplomacy, and a master's degree in public administration from the university. He went to the United States in 2001, and gained another master's degree in public administration from Syracuse University in 2002.

== Personal life ==
He is married to Lee Ji-hyun; the couple has a son and a daughter. He is a Buddhist.

== Election results ==
=== General elections ===
Year	Elections	Constituency	Political party	Votes (%)	Remarks
2020	21st General Election	Seongbuk A (Seoul)	DPK	82,954 (60.90%)	Won
2024	22nd General Election	Seongbuk A (Seoul)	DPK	74,707 (55.68%)	Won

=== Local elections ===
==== Mayor of Seoul Seongbuk ====
Year	Elections	Constituency	Political party	Votes (%)	Remarks
2010	5th Local Election	Mayor of Seoul Seongbuk	Democratic	95,951 (47.57%)	Won
2014	6th Local Election	Mayor of Seoul Seongbuk	NPAD	124,555 (55.22%)	Won
