= National Pension Service =

Public pension fund in South Korea

- Native name: 국민연금공단
- Type: Government-linked company Pension fund (Sovereign wealth fund)
- Industry: Investment management
- Founded: 1988; 38 years ago
- Headquarters: Deokjin District, Jeonju, South Korea
- Key people: Tae-Hyun Kim, chief executive officer
- AUM: ▲KRW₩ 1.227 trillion (2025)
- Parent: Ministry of Health and Welfare
- Website: nps.or.kr

- National Pension Service
- Hangul: 국민연금공단
- Hanja: 國民年金公團
- RR: Gungminnyeongeum gongdan
- MR: Kungminnyŏn'gŭm kongdan

The National Pension Service (NPS; Korean: 국민연금공단) is a public pension fund in South Korea. It is the third largest in the world with over $900 billion in assets, and is the largest investor in South Korea. It was established in 1986 with an aim to provide financial support to Korean citizens who can no longer work due to old age, disability, or death caused by an accident. It also runs various welfare programs to help improve the overall well-being of the population.

== History ==
The National Pension Service (NPS) of Korea was created following the promulgation of the National Pension Act in December 1986, which established the legal basis for the pension system. In September 1987, the National Pension Corporation was formed to oversee the administration and operation of the system. At the time of its founding, the National Pension Service (NPS) operated with 656 employees across 6 divisions, 15 departments, and 14 regional branches. However, as the scope of the NPS expanded, including the introduction of special old-age pension payments and the extension of coverage to rural areas, the agency's workload grew substantially. In response, the organization underwent structural specialization and staff expansion.

The national pension system was first implemented in January 1988, covering workplaces with 10 or more full-time employees. This compulsory coverage was extended in January 1992 to include workplaces with five or more full-time employees. In January 1993, the payment of Special Old-age Pension benefits commenced.

The National Pension Research Institute was founded in April 1995 to conduct research related to the pension system. In July 1995, compulsory coverage was extended to farmers and fishermen in rural areas, followed by the extension to workplace-based foreigners in August 1995. By April 1999, compulsory coverage expanded to include the majority of the population in urban areas.

In November 1999, the National Pension Fund Management Center was launched to oversee fund management. Between July 2003 and 2006, compulsory coverage was gradually expanded to corporations and workplaces with fewer than five full-time employees. The organization was renamed the "National Pension Service" in July 2007.

In May 2009, the Retirement Planning Service was introduced, alongside the launch of the NPS International Service Center. January 2011 saw the establishment of the NPS International Center, integrating the International Cooperation Department and the International Service Center. Concurrently, the collection of contributions was consigned to the National Health Insurance Service.

In April 2011, a system for the assessment and registration of persons with disabilities was implemented in accordance with the Welfare of Disabled Persons Act, and support programs for the disabled commenced in October 2011. In December 2012, the scope of income for insured individuals under the National Basic Living Security Act was determined. In 2013, the fund surpassed KRW 400 trillion, making it one of the world's top three pension funds.

Support for the Basic Pension operation began in July 2014. The NPS headquarters relocated to Jeonju in January 2015. The Retirement Planning Service was fully implemented in December 2015. On January 30, 2017, NPS opened up an office in New York City's One Vanderbilt. In February 2017, the National Pension Service Investment Management (NPSIM) was relocated to Jeonju. From 2022 to 2025, Kim Tae-hyun was the CEO of the fund. In 2022, the NPS reported an annual surplus, recent surpluses have been between 1% and 5% of GDP. In May 2024, NPS announced its intention to aim for a 65% ratio of risky assets. As of 2024, out of ₩1,101 trillion the fund had invested ₩597 trillion in assets outside Korea and ₩504 trillion domestically. In June 2024, NPS and the Korean Central Bank agreed to expand their currency swap line from $35 billion to $50 billion. In December 2024, the swap line was expanded to $65 billion. The NPS is looking to buy a portfolio of blue-chip stocks from emerging markets.

== Solvency ==
The scheme is currently in annual surplus. According to projections published 27 January 2023 by the NPS, at the current contribution rates and replacement rate, surpluses are projected to remain until 2041, and the fund to remain solvent until 2055. Due to demographic changes projected to continue, in order for the scheme to remain solvent in the long term it is suggested that, in the next few years, there be an adjustment to the contribution rate somewhere between 1 and 2%.

== Assets ==
The National Pension Service mainly invests in government bonds, but also retains sizeable investments in domestic and foreign equities. As of year-end 2012, the NPS had approximately 60% domestic bonds (2% of which was in provincial or territorial bonds), 19% domestic stocks, 8% foreign stocks and 5% foreign bonds. By 2016, those proportions had changed to 52% domestic bonds, 19% domestic stocks, 14% foreign stocks, and 4% foreign bonds. The NPS is a significant shareholder in 94 different listed South Korean companies, owning more than 5% of their shares, and owns at least one share of approximately 600 different companies, approximately 30% of all the listed firms in the country. Overall, the NPS invests specifically in blue chip and large market capitalization stocks, which suits their desire for stability (in well established companies) and long-term returns on investment. Almost all of its investments are below the disclosure threshold of 10% to avoid mandatory disclosure when a company obtains more than 10% of a company's shares. The holdings are viewed as stable by the investment community and thus seek to sell their stake(s) in those companies to other institutional investors.

Despite the fund's large size, its investment performance has faced criticism. In 2012, the NPS reported an operating return of 6.99%, and in 2013, 4.16%, which was the lowest return among the six largest pension funds in the world. Concerns have been raised regarding the efficiency of its asset management practices. The NPS also plays an active role in corporate governance. In the first quarter of 2009, it exercised its voting rights at 348 general shareholders meeting, and voted against at least one agenda item in 84 of them (24.1%). The NPS voted against a total of 111 items out of a total 2,417 proposals, yielding a disapproval rate of 4.59%. This disapproval rate rises to 6.33%, when abstentions are included. In meetings, the NPS voted against one agenda item in 63 meetings and against two or more agenda items in 21 meetings.
