= Rhyu Si-min =

South Korean politician (born 1959)

Rhyu Si-min 유시민 柳時敏

Member of the National Assembly
- In office 25 April 2003 – 29 May 2008
- Preceded by: Kwack Chi-Young (canceled)
- Succeeded by: Son Beom-gyu
- Constituency: Goyang Deogyang A (Gyeonggi)

Minister of Health and Welfare
- In office 10 February 2006 – 22 May 2007
- President: Roh Moo-hyun
- Prime Minister: Lee Hae-chan; Han Duck-soo (acting); Han Myeong-sook; Kwon O-kyu (acting); Han Duck-soo
- Preceded by: Kim Geun-tae
- Succeeded by: Byun Jae-jin

Personal details
- Born: July 28, 1959 (age 67) Bukbu-dong, Gyeongju, South Korea
- Party: Independent (2018–); Justice Party (South Korea) (2012–2018); Unified Progressive Party (2011–2012); People's Participation Party (2009–2011); Independent (2008–2009); United New Democratic Party (2007–2008); Uri Party (2003–2007); People's Party for Reform (2002–2003)
- Spouse: Han Gyeong-hye
- Education: Seoul National University; Department of Economics (B.S.); Johannes Gutenberg University of Mainz; Gutenberg School of Management & Economics (M.S.)
- Profession: Politician

Military service
- Allegiance: South Korea
- Branch/service: Republic of Korea Army
- Years of service: 1980–1983
- Rank: Byeongjang

Korean name
- Hangul: 유시민
- Hanja: 柳時敏
- RR: Yu Simin
- MR: Yu Simin

Rhyu Si-min (Korean: 유시민; born 28 July 1959) is a South Korean politician who served as the 44th Minister of Health and Welfare from February 2006 to May 2007 under the Roh Moo-hyun administration.

Rhyu studied economics at Seoul National University and later earned a master's degree in economics from the Johannes Gutenberg University of Mainz. He worked as a journalist for The Dong-A Ilbo and The Hankyoreh, before entering politics in August 2002.

In February 2006, he became Minister of Health and Welfare but resigned on 22 May 2007. On 18 August 2007, he announced his candidacy for president, but later dropped out during the primary.

Later, Rhyu was elected to the National Assembly as a member of the United New Democratic Party, representing the Deogyang A district.

He was selected by the liberal opposition parties to run for governor of Gyeonggi Province on 13 May 2010. In December 2011, Rhyu agreed to merge his People's Participation Party with the Unified Progressive Party and served as one of the co-chairs after the merger.

He announced his retirement from politics on 19 February 2013.

== Career ==
After graduating from Shim-in Senior High School in Daegu, he attended Seoul National University, where he served as president of the student council in the 1980s. He actively opposed Chun Doo-hwan's military regime, advocating for freedom and democracy in South Korea. During this period, he was arrested in connection with the Seoul National University Campus Informant Scandal and subsequently forced to serve 33 months of military service near the demilitarized zone. Rhyu gained prominence within South Korea's pro-democracy movement after his Grounds For Appeal (항소이유서) was published, challenging Seoul District Court's verdict.

In November 1988, Rhyu married Han Gyeong-hye, a fellow participant in the pro-democracy movement and a Seoul National University graduate in mathematics. He served as an aide to Assemblyman Lee Hae Chan for 2 years, until February 1991. In 1992, Rhyu and his wife traveled to Germany to pursue further studies in their respective fields.

Since 2019, Rhyu has hosted a YouTube show and podcast called Alileo, which translates to "I'd like to let you know".

On 25 September 2020, Rhyu sparked controversy in South Korea by referring to Kim Jong Un as an "Enlightenment monarch" after the North Korean leader issued an official apology for the killing of a South Korean official, who had allegedly attempted to defect to North Korea.

== Election results ==
Year	Elections	Constituency	Political party	Votes (%)	Results
2003	2003 By-election	Goyang Deogyang A (Gyeonggi)	People's Party for Reform	14,833 (43.28%)	Won
2004	17th National Assembly General Election	Goyang Deogyang A (Gyeonggi)	Uri Party	40,288 (47.93%)	Won
2008	18th National Assembly General Election	Suseong B (Daegu)	Independent	23,005 (32.59%)	Defeated (2nd)
2012	19th National Assembly General Election	Proportional representation (12nd)	Unified Progressive Party	2,198,082 (10.30%)	Not Elected

=== Local elections ===
==== Governor of Gyeonggi ====
Year	Elections	Constituency	Political party	Votes (%)	Remarks
2010	5th Iocal Election	Gyeonggi (Governoral Elections)	People's Participation Party	2,079,892 (47.79%)	Defeated (2nd)

National Assembly of the Republic of Korea
Preceded by Kwack Chi-Young	Member of the National Assembly from Goyang Deogyang A (Gyeonggi); 25 April 2003–29 May 2008	Succeeded by Son Beom-gyu
Political offices
Preceded by Kim Geun-tae	Health and Welfare Minister of South Korea; 10 February 2006–22 May 2007	Succeeded by Byun Jae-jin
