= People's Party for Reform =

2002-2004 South Korean Political Party

People's Party for Reform 개혁국민정당
- Abbreviation: Reform Party
- Leader: Rhyu Si-min
- Founded: November 16, 2002
- Dissolved: September 12, 2004
- Split from: Millennium Democratic Party
- Succeeded by: Uri Party (Rhyu Si-min faction); Democratic Labor Party (Lee Yong-hwi faction)
- Membership: 10,270
- Ideology: Social liberalism Pro-Roh; Liberalism; Participatory democracy
- Political position: Centre to Centre-left
- Colors: Light green
- National Assembly: 2 / 299

Korean name
- Hangul: 개혁국민정당
- RR: Gaehyeok gungmin jeongdang
- MR: Kaehyŏk kungmin chŏngdang

The People's Party for Reform (Korean: 개혁국민정당) was a South Korean political party of the Democratic camp founded in 2002.

== History ==
It was founded in 2002 by pro-Roh Moo-hyun political figures, including Rhyu Si-min and Moon Sung-keun under the banners of eradication corruption, national unity, participatory democracy and the concept of "internet democracy". Subsequently the party supported Roh Moo-hyn in the 2002 South Korean presidential election.

On 1 November 2003, the People's Party for Reform, having recruited numerous pro-Roh lawmakers from the former Democratic Party, sought a merger into the Uri Party, which had been formed by pro-Roh defectors from the Democratic Party. On 11 November 2003 instead of a formal merger, the party resolved to voluntarily dissolve via online voting and a Central Committee decision, intending for its members to join the Uri Party individually; however, the National Electoral Commission (NEC) ruled that these resolutions were invalid. Subsequently, the party leadership faction led by Rhyu Si-min joined the Uri party, triggering a mass exodus of mainstream members who held social-liberal views. The NEC declared the decision to merge with the Uri Party, made by Rhyu's faction via online and Central Committee votes, to be an illegal violation of the party constitution, which mandated that dissolution or merger could only be authorised through a national party convention. Meanwhile, a faction remaining within the Reform Party, led by Lee Yong-hwi, formed an emergency committee and successfully filed for an injunction to suspend the duties of the leadership and appoint an acting representative, targeting party leaders Rhyu Si-min and Kim Won-ung along with seven other executive committee members. Although Lee Yong-hwi's side won this legal battle just days before the 2004 South Korean legislative election, the party faced automatic dissolution under the Political Parties Act because it failed to maintain five or more metropolitan or provincial seats. Consequently the leadership declared their support for and an electoral alliance with the Democratic Labor Party (DLP) for the 2004 election, asserting that the DLP was best aligned with the parties founding principles and ideology. Furthermore, they characterised the party's dissolution as an act of "illegal party dissolution" and an exercise of oppressive force by the faction led by Rhyu Si-min. Ultimately, the party was dissolved for failing to meet the requirements stated by the Political Parties Act.

The People's Party for Reform secured up to two parliamentary seats; it first entered the legislature on 25 November 2002, when Representative Kim Won-ung, a reformist figure from the Grand National Party joined the party, and subsequently reached the two-seat mark following the election of candidate Rhyu Si-min in the by-election on 24 April 2003. However, the party faced criticism; because it championed "electronic democracy" based on participatory democracy, conducting most decision-making processes online, and made unlawful decisions that disregarded the party constitution. It ultimately ended up dissolving.

== Party history ==
- 23 August 2002, proposed the formation of the "Committee to Promote a Reformist People's Party for Political Revolution and National Unity."
- 29 August 2002 – Launched the official website.
- 20 October 2002 – Held the inaugural preparatory meeting.
- 16 November 2002 – Held the party's founding convention.
- November 25, 2002 – Representative Kim Won-ung joined the party.
- 24 April 2003 – Candidate Rhyu Si-min won the April 24 by-election.
- 1 November 2003 – Voted to dissolve the party via an online poll of members.
- 11 November 2003 – Many members joined the Uri Party.
- 19 November 2003 – The National Election Commission ruled the online dissolution vote invalid.
- 22 November 2003 – Members advocating to remain formed an emergency steering committee.
- December 2003 – Members who wished to remain protested because the faction that had left the party refused to relinquish control of the website.
- September 2004 – Ceased to exist after failing to meet the requirements of the revised Political Parties Act.

== See also ==
- Uri Party
- Roh Moo-hyun
- People's Participation Party
