= Kim Seong-joo =

South Korean footballer (born 1998)

Personal information
- Date of birth: 23 August 1998 (age 28)
- Place of birth: South Korea
- Position: Forward

Team information
- Current team: Jeonnam Dragons
- Number: 26

Senior career*
Years	Team	Apps	(Gls)
2017–	Jeonnam Dragons	2	(0)
2018–	→ Daejeon Citizen (loan)	6	(0)
- * Club domestic league appearances and goals as of 14:41, 27 December 2018 (UTC)

Kim Seong-joo (born 23 August 1998) is a South Korean footballer who plays for Jeonnam Dragons.

== Club ==
As of 23 July 2018.

Club	Season	League			Cup		Continental		Other		Total	
Club	Season	Division	Apps	Goals	Apps	Goals	Apps	Goals	Apps	Goals	Apps	Goals
Jeonnam Dragons	2017	K League Classic	2	0	0	0	–		0	0	2	0
Daejeon Citizen (loan)	2018	K League 2	6	0	0	0	–		0	0	6	0
Career total			8	0	0	0	0	0	0	0	8	0
