= Kim Tae-hyun (politician) =

South Korean politician

Chairman and CEO of the National Pension Service
- In office September 2, 2022 – August 2025

Chairman and President of the Korea Deposit Insurance Corporation
- In office 2021 – September 2022

Personal details
- Born: November 15, 1966 (age 60) Jinju, South Korea
- Education: Seoul National University

Kim Tae-hyun (born November 15, 1966) is a South Korean politician. Kim was the Chairman and CEO of the National Pension Service and Chairman and President of the Korea Deposit Insurance Corporation.

== Early life ==
Kim was born on November 15, 1966, in Jinju, South Korea. He graduated from Seoul National University´s School of Business and earned a master´s degree in Business Administration from Seoul National University´s Graduate School of Business. In 1991, Kim passed the civil service exam.

== Career ==
In 1996, Kim became a deputy director in the Securities Business Division of the Financial Policy Bureau in the Ministry of Finance and Economy. In 1999, Kim moved to the Securities System Division within the same bureau. In 2002, Kim became a director of the Financial Policy Division within the Ministry of Finance and Economy.

In 2007, Kim became the secretary to the Minister of Finance and Economy. In 2008, Kim was promoted to the head of the Asset Management Division of the Financial Services Bureau in the Financial Service Commission. He also became the head of the Insurance Division with the same commission. In 2009, Kim became seconded to the Presidential Secretariat. In 2011, Kim was promoted to the head of the Financial Policy Division of the Financial Policy Bureau within the Financial Service Commission. Kim was given a Presidential Citation for Outstanding Public Service in 2012.

In 2016, Kim was promoted to the Director General of the Capital Markets Bureau within the Financial Services Commission. In 2017, Kim was Director General of the Financial Services Bureau and the Financial Policy Bureau. In 2019, Kim became the Standing Commissioner and Secretary General of the Financial Policy Bureau. In 2021, he was appointed to a three-year term as the Chairman and President of the Korea Deposit Insurance Corporation. On September 2, 2022, Kim became the Chairman and CEO of the National Pension Service. Kim served a three-year term that ended in August 2025.

== Personal life ==
Kim is married and has a son.
