= Jeong Se-hyun =

South Korean politician

- 정세현

Executive Vice-chair of National Unification Advisory Council
- In office 2 September 2019 – 31 August 2021
- President: Moon Jae-in
- Preceded by: Kim Deog-ryong
- Succeeded by: Lee Seok-hyun

Minister of Unification
- In office 29 January 2002 – 30 June 2004
- President: Kim Dae-Jung; Roh Moo-hyun
- Preceded by: Hong Soon-young
- Succeeded by: Chung Dong-young

Personal details
- Born: 7 May 1945 (age 81) Manchuria (now-Heilongjiang, China)
- Education: Seoul National University
- Religion: Won Buddhism

- Jeong Se-hyun
- Hangul: 정세현
- Hanja: 丁世鉉
- RR: Jeong Sehyeon
- MR: Chŏng Sehyŏn

Jeong Se-hyun (Korean: 정세현; Hanja: 丁世鉉; born 7 May 1945) is a South Korean politician who served as an Unification Minister under two consecutive presidents from 2002 to 2004.

He spent more than two decades at the Ministry of Unification which he first joined as a researcher on communist countries at then-Board of National Unification in 1977. In 2002 he was appointed as the head of the Ministry and assumed the post until June 2004 serving two consecutive Presidents, Kim Dae-jung and Roh Moo-hyun. He was also credited with boosting inter-Korean cooperative projects including Kaesong Industrial Region, a landmark site of Inter-Korean cooperation.

In 2019 Jeong was appointed the Executive Vice-Chair of National Unification Advisory Council led by the President Moon Jae-in, the third president Jeong serves and third liberal president of the country. He was credited with helping to create the predecessor of the Council, Presidential Advisory Council on Peaceful Unification Policy, back in 1981.

He also worked at Korean think tanks - now-Sejong Institute and Korea Institute for National Unification - as their ranking member. In addition, he was the visiting scholar to Kyung Hee University and Myongji University as well as the Endowed-Chair Professor of Ewha Womans University and Kyungnam University.

Moreover, he previously served as the 11th President of Wonkwang University and the 6th President of Korean Council for Reconciliation and Cooperation, one of South Korean NGOs that most actively engage with North Korea. He currently chairs Korea Peace Forum.

He holds three degrees from Seoul National University: bachelor in political science and diplomacy and master and doctorate in international relations. He focused his postgraduate studies on Chinese studies earning master for analysing Han Fei, a Chinese philosopher, and doctorate for Mao Zedong's foreign policy.

== Honours ==
- Order of Service Merit by the government of South Korea (2002)

Political offices
Preceded by Hong Soon-young	Minister of Unification; 2002–2004	Succeeded by Chung Dong-young
