= Hong Soon-young =

South Korean diplomat (1937–2014)

- Hangul: 홍순영
- Hanja: 洪淳瑛
- RR: Hong Sunyeong
- MR: Hong Sunyŏng

Hong Soon-young (Korean: 홍순영; 30 January 1937 – 30 April 2014) was a South Korean diplomat. He has served in several high-level posts, including as presidential aide for state affairs, Foreign Minister, and Minister of Unification, and has been ambassador to Russia (1992–1993), Germany (1994–1998), The People's Republic of China (2000–2001), Malaysia (1990–1992), and Pakistan (1984–1987). He is a graduate of Seoul National University and attended the Graduate School of International Relations at Columbia University.

Preceded by Park Chung-soo	Foreign Minister of South Korea; August 1998–December 2000	Succeeded by Lee Joung-bin
Preceded by Lim Dong-won	Unification Minister of South Korea; September 7, 2001–January 2002	Succeeded by Jeong Se-hyun
