= Kim Jae-sub =

South Korean politician

Member of the National Assembly
- Incumbent
- Assumed office 30 May 2024
- Constituency: Dobong A (Seoul)

Personal details
- Born: 28 June 1987 (age 39) Dobong District, South Korea
- Party: People Power
- Education: Seoul National University

Kim Jae-sub (Korean: 김재섭) is a South Korean politician. Kim is a member of the National Assembly and the People Power Party.

== Biography ==
He graduated from Seoul National University with a law degree.

He ran for election in Dobong A during the 2020 South Korean legislative election but was unsuccessful. However, he ran again in the 2024 South Korean legislative election and was successfully elected.

He is a centre-right politician who is politically close to Han Dong-hoon and Oh Se-hoon, while remaining critical of Yoon Suk-yeol.

In 2026, Kim was sued by the People Power Party for allegations relating to a 1995 assault case regarding Jung Won-oh, the Democratic Party of Korea's candidate for Seoul mayor. The complaint alleges that Kim violated Article 250 of the Public Official Election Act because he published false information for the purpose of defeating a candidate.

== Election results ==
Year	Elections	Constituency	Political party	Votes (%)	Results
2020	21st National Assembly General Election	Dobong A (Seoul)	UFP	37,967 (40.49%)	Defeated (2nd)
2024	22nd National Assembly General Election	Dobong A (Seoul)	PPP	46,374 (49.05%)	Won
