= Grand Unified Democratic New Party =

2007–2008 political party in South Korea

Grand Unified Democratic New Party 대통합민주신당
- Leader: Sohn Hak-kyu (last)
- Floor Leader: Kim Hyo-seok (last)
- Founded: 5 August 2007
- Dissolved: 17 February 2008
- Merger of: Uri Party
- Split from: Uri; Grand National; Democratic
- Merged into: United Democratic
- Headquarters: 15-16 Yeouido-dong, Yeongdeungpo-gu, Seoul, South Korea
- Ideology: Liberalism (South Korean)
- Political position: Centre to centre-left
- Colours: Orange

- Grand Unified Democratic New Party
- Hangul: 대통합민주신당
- Hanja: 大統合民主新黨
- RR: Daetonghap minju sindang
- MR: Taet'onghap minju sindang

The Grand Unified Democratic New Party (GUDNP; Korean: 대통합민주신당) was a political party of South Korea. It was formed out of the Uri Party and its resulting splinter groups. Chung Dong-young was the party's candidate in the 2007 South Korean presidential election; he lost to Lee Myung-bak. On February 17, 2008, the party merged with the Democratic Party to form the United Democratic Party.

== Brief history ==
The party was formed when loyalists to president Roh Moo-hyun in the Uri Party chose to break ranks from other party members who showed lukewarm support for the administration. Some 80 out of 152 lawmakers of the Uri Party joined the new party, a conservative-liberal minority group from the Grand National Party (led by Sohn Hak-kyu), and a group of progressive civil rights' group from outside South Korean politics also joined, seeking to complete political reforms.

As a result of merge with the Uri Party, this party has been ranked as the biggest political party in the legislative by 140 of 298 seats (as of January 14, 2008). After receiving a 'shocked' result at the 2007 presidential election, the delegates of its party decided to elect a new leader, with adopting a 'Papal conclave'-style system. On January 11, with more than a half delegates' vote, Sohn Hak-kyu was elected to lead at the 2008 parliamentary election.

== Principles of policies ==
This party's platform emphasized these 4 key ideologies.

- Democracy
- Peace
- Integration (political)
- Environmentalism

== Presidential election primary ==
=== Timeline ===
These list of key events has been managed by its public primary election committee (국민경선위원회).

- August 21 and August 22, 2007 - Official announcement has been made by its committee. Registration process has been done.
- August 25, 2007 - The full list of official candidate for the primary has been announced. 'Cut-off' process begins.
- August 27, 2007 - 'The policy debate' for its candidates has been done.
- September 5, 2007 - The result of cut-off election (to nominate 5 candidates to go to its primary) will be announced.
- September 5 to September 14, 2007 - Nationwide 'Policy debate'(tour) will be held in several cities.
- September 15 to October 14, 2007 - The primary election will be held in 8 multi-regional areas. (see 'Results' for more details)
- October 14, 2007 - Chung Dong-young was elected as the official presidential candidate of the party.

=== Rules ===
- Cut-off process (August 25 – September 5)
  - The official result of cut-off process has been combining a result from public poll(50%), and a poll result from its 10,000 randomly selected delegates(50%). 'Public poll' has been conducted from all eligible voters (whether this party is in favour or not).
  - Top-5 candidates who earn more votes will join to its official primary(Result has been announced-see 'Candidates')
- Primary election (September 15 – October 14)

The official result of this primary combines all votes of these key methods. First-past-the-post and Electronic voting system is being used.

  - 1. Regional Rounds from 8 multi-provincial divisions (see below)
  - 2. The total number of 'Mobile vote' cast
  - 3. Public opinion polls which conducted from October 8 to 14

Method 1 and 2 grants exactly 90% of results (Method 3 grants 10%). The official candidate of this party will be nominated on October 14, just after the last regional rounds finishes. Due to the executives of this party's decision, All candidates did not contested during the Hangawi holidays and the 2007 Inter-Korean summit periods.

=== Candidates ===
As of August 25, 2007, 9 politicians has been set up to their presidential bid. Before starting their official primary to the South Korean public, they have to access the 'cut-off' process to reduce from 9 to 5. Later, the number of candidates reduced to 3 after ex-Health and Welfare Minister Rhyu Si-min and former Prime Minister Han Myeong-sook quit the race.

Here's a list of official candidates of the UNDP primary that announced on September 5, 2007, 05:30GMT.

Name	Occupation	Key Policies	Notes
Sohn Hak-kyu (손학규)	Former Governor of Gyeonggi Province	Advanced economy, Integral society, Peace of Korean Peninsula	led a conservative-liberal group from Grand National Party
Chung Dong-young (정동영)	Former Minister of Unification	Continental and peaceful economy, '40 million middle-class' plan, Air-7 project	Former chairperson of Uri Party
Lee Hae-chan (이해찬)	Member for Gwanak B	Stable peace-footing of Korean Peninsula, Employment&Education21, Social integration, Matured democracy	Former Prime Minister of the Republic of Korea (36th)

(Placed in order. Not considered its cut-off results. Based as of September 23, 2007)

=== Results ===
Region	Date	Voters	%	Son Hak-gyu	Chung Dong-young	Lee Hae-chan	Total
Ulsan and Jeju	September 15	84,257	18.9	4,089 (26.1%)	5,265 (33.6%)	3,414 (21.8%)	15,658
Gangwon Province and North Chungcheong Province	September 16	93,834	20.9	5,279 (26.9%)	8,645 (44.0%)	5,511 (28.1%)	19,626
Gwangju and South Jeolla Province	September 29	246,518	22.63	19,906 (35.68%)	26,065 (46.71%)	9,826 (17.61%)	55,797
Busan and South Gyeongsang Province	September 30	209,518	14.61	8,577 (28.01%)	11,150 (36.42%)	10,890 (35.57%)	30,617
Daejeon, South Chungcheong Province and North Jeolla Province	October 14			9,467 (16.12%)	42,026 (71.56%)	7,236 (12.32%)	58,729
Incheon and Gyeonggi Province	October 14			16,747 (41.88%)	16,142 (40.37%)	7,098 (17.75%)	39,987
Daegu and North Gyeongsang Province	October 14			3,547 (38.96%)	2,706 (29.72%)	2,851 (31.32%)	9,104
Seoul	October 14			13,631 (32.14%)	20,977 (49.46%)	7,802 (18.40%)	42,410
Mobile votes	October 4–14	238,725	74.33	70,031 (39.46%)	62,138 (35.02%)	45,284 (25.52%)	177,453
Opinion polls	October 8–14	-	-	17,525 (35.34%)	21,850 (44.06%)	10,216 (20.60%)	49,591
Total		1,969,156	25.18	168,799 (34.04%)	216,984 (43.75%)	110,128 (22.21%)	495,911

Source: The current status of the UNDP Primary, Seoprise.com, Retrieved on October 1, 2007.

=== Re-merge with Democratic Party ===
On February 17, 2008, the UNDP merged with the Democratic Party, forming the United Democratic Party. This was four years after the Uri Party's split from the Millennium Democratic Party.

== Election results ==
Election	Candidate	Votes	%	Result
2007	Chung Dong-young	6,174,681	26.1	Not elected

== See also ==
- United Democratic Party
- Uri Party
- Liberalism
- Contributions to liberal theory
- Liberalism worldwide
- List of liberal parties
- Liberal democracy
- Politics of South Korea
- Liberalism in South Korea
