= Shin Ji-ho =

Korean politician

Shin Ji-ho 신지호

Personal details
- Born: 23 June 1963 (age 63) Jongno, Seoul; South Korea
- Party: Grand National Party
- Education: Yonsei University; Keio University
- Profession: Politician
- Website: Official Website

Korean name
- Hangul: 신지호
- Hanja: 申志鎬
- RR: Sin Jiho
- MR: Sin Chiho

Shin Ji-ho (Korean: 신지호; born 23 June 1963) is a South Korean politician. He was noted for being a temporary spokesperson of Na Kyung-won for the October 2011 by-election. He is one of the prominent members of the New Right movement.

== Controversy ==
- He made a disrespectful comment towards the protesters in the Yongsan Incident calling them "criminals" and supported police brutality against them.
- He was shown drunken for a live debate show on MBC on 7 October 2011 about issues on the October 2011 by-election; later resigned as a spokesperson of the candidate, Na Kyung-won, on the next day.

== Election results ==
Year	Elections	Constituency	Political party	Votes (%)	Results
2008	18th National Assembly General Election	Dobong A (Seoul)	GNP	32,613 (48.04%)	Won
