= Deokjin District =

Coordinates: 35.829359°N 127.134363°E

- Non-autonomous District
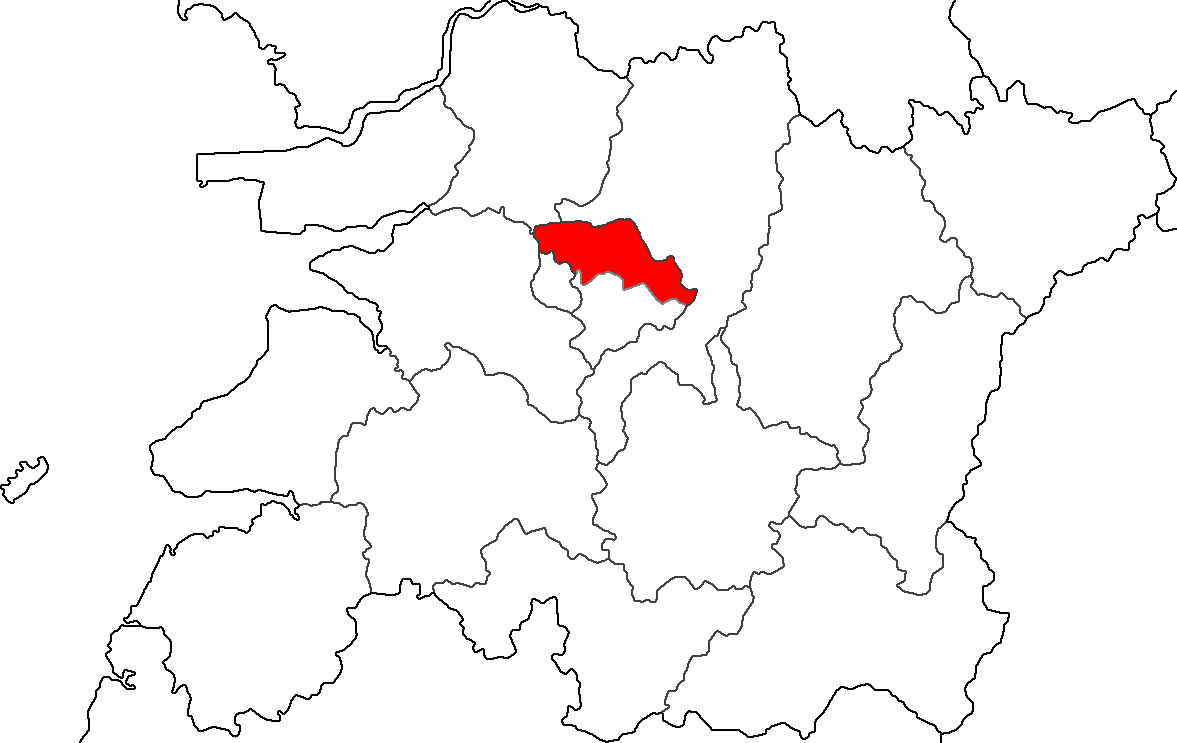
- Country: South Korea
- State: Jeonbuk
- City: Jeonju
- Administrative divisions: 15 dong

Area
  - Total: 110.77 km^{2} (42.77 sq mi)

Population (2012.12)
  - Total: 284,877
  - Density: 2,571/km^{2} (6,660/sq mi)
  - Dialect: Jeolla
- Website: Deokjin District Office

Korean name
- Hangul: 덕진구
- Hanja: 德津區
- RR: Deokjin-gu
- MR: Tŏkchin-gu

Deokjin District (Korean: 덕진구) is a non-autonomous district of Jeonju, North Jeolla Province, South Korea.

== Administrative divisions ==
Deokjin District is divided into 15 neighborhoods (dong).

	Hangul	Hanja
Jinbuk-dong	진북동	鎭北洞
Inhu-dong	인후1동	麟後洞
Inhu-dong	인후2동	麟後洞
Inhu-dong	인후3동	麟後洞
Deokjin-dong	덕진동	德津洞
Geumam-dong	금암1동	金岩洞
Geumam-dong	금암2동	金岩洞
Palbok-dong	팔복동	八福洞
Ua-dong	우아1동	牛牙洞
Ua-dong	우아2동	牛牙洞
Hoseong-dong	호성동	湖城洞
Songcheon-dong	송천1동	松川洞
Songcheon-dong	송천2동	松川洞
Jochon-dong	조촌동	助村洞
Dongsan-dong	동산동	東山洞

== See also ==
- Wansan District
