= Uri Party =

2003–2007 political party in South Korea

Uri Party 열린우리당
- Logo of Uri Party (2006–2007)
- President: Roh Moo-hyun
- Founded: 1 November 2003
- Dissolved: 20 August 2007
- Split from: Democratic Party; Grand National Party; People's Party for Reform
- Merged into: Grand Unified Democratic New Party
- Headquarters: 133 Yeongdeungpo-dong 6-ga, Yeongdeungpo-gu, Seoul, South Korea
- Ideology: Liberalism (South Korean); Social liberalism
- Political position: Centre-left
- Colours: Yellow

- Uri Party
- Hangul: 열린우리당
- Hanja: 열린우리黨
- RR: Yeollin uridang
- MR: Yŏllin uridang

The Yeollin Uri Party (Korean: 열린우리당; lit. 'Our Open Party'), generally abbreviated to Uri Party (우리당), was the ruling social-liberal political party in South Korea from 2003 to 2007. A liberal party, it was created to support then-President Roh Moo-hyun. Chung Sye Kyun was the last leader of the party and twice served as its chairman. In 2007 the party merged the United New Democratic Party to form the Democratic Party. The current-day descendant of the party is the Democratic Party of Korea, but progressives in the party have become members of the Justice Party and Social Democratic Party.

== Brief history ==
Logo of Uri Party (until 2006)

The party was formed when the conservative-dominated National Assembly voted to impeach then President Roh Moo-hyun, loyalists and pro-Roh faction in the Millennium Democratic Party chose to break ranks from other party members who showed lukewarm support for the administration. Some 42 out of 103 lawmakers of the Millennium Democratic Party joined the new party, and 5 lawmakers from the conservative Grand National Party also joined, seeking to complete political reforms.

The Uri Party won a sweeping victory in the 2004 Parliamentary election, winning 152 of 299 seats. It was the first time that a liberal party had won a majority in 41 years.

== Party platform and policy direction ==
Policywise, the Uri Party emphasized increased spending on social services for the low-income population while de-emphasizing economic growth. It was conciliatory towards North Korea while moving away from the traditional military alliance with the U.S. and Japan. Even after North Korea had continued testing explosive devices, Uri Party members have for continued aid to North Korea, leading to heavy criticism from conservative parties and accusations of harboring Communist sympathizers. The Uri Party placed most of the blame for the crisis on the hard-line policies of the United States toward North Korea.

In addition, the party was the most culturally liberal party among the historical liberal parties in South Korea. The Uri Party insisted on expanding women's rights and abolishing the National Security Act. The party tried very hard to clear up the legacy of far-right military dictatorship and Japanese colonization, which is considered a tragedy in South Korean history. The bill, led by the party and Roh Moo-hyun, is Special law to redeem pro-Japanese collaborators' property. Uri Party was also liberal in the issue of disabled rights. In 2006, the 'Disability Discrimination Act' (장애인차별금지법) was enacted under the leadership of the Uri Party. The law was opposed by conservative conglomerates.

The Hankyoreh editorial evaluated that the Uri Party was close to American liberalism.

== Significant events ==
The party came to international attention when their members physically blocked the speaker's chair in the National Assembly in a failed attempt to prevent the impeachment vote on President Roh on March 12, 2004. (The vote was subsequently overruled by South Korea's Constitutional Court on May 14, 2004.) The impeachment was influenced to the Assembly elections, which the party won a majority.

On August 19, 2004, the party suffered an embarrassing setback when party chairman Shin Ki-nam resigned following revelations by a national investigation that his father had worked for the Japanese military police during the Japanese occupation. The investigation, initiated on the 56th anniversary of Liberation Day (August 15, 2004) by President Roh, was a part of a national campaign to shed light on the activity of collaborators during the Japanese occupation. The campaign was vocally supported by Shin and backed by the Uri Party.

The party's popularity has decreased considerably after the 2004 election because of internal strife and scandals related to the President, who had admitted to feeling "incompetent" and unfit for the job. The Uri party failed to secure a single seat out of six electoral districts in the by-election held on April 30, 2005, losing its majority status in the National Assembly. Despite they lost the majority status, they relied on support from the centrist Democratic Party and left-wing Democratic Labor Party, which the liberals maintained majority in the National Assembly.

Prior to the Uri Party's devastating defeat in regional elections held on May 31, 2006, Chung apologized for the party's "self-righteous attitude and inadequacy". The party failed to win in all but one area, while the opposition Grand National Party took 12 of the 16 key regional posts in the election. The Uri Party even lost in Daejeon, a city long considered a secure ruling-party stronghold.

== Merger with the Grand Unified Democratic New Party ==
On August 18, 2007, the delegates of the Uri Party decided to merge into the newly created liberal party Grand Unified Democratic New Party.

== Election results ==
=== Legislature ===
Election	Leader	Constituency			Party list			Seats	Position	Status
Election	Leader	Votes	%	Seats	Votes	%	Seats	Seats	Position	Status
2004	Chung Dong-young	8,957,665	41.99	129 / 243	8,145,824	38.27	23 / 56	152 / 299	1st	Government

=== Local ===
Election	Leader	Metropolitan mayor/Governor	Provincial legislature	Municipal mayor	Municipal legislature
2006	Chung Dong-young	1 / 16	52 / 733	19 / 230	630 / 2,888

== See also ==
- List of liberal parties
- Politics of South Korea
- Liberalism in South Korea
  - Democratic Party of Korea - some Uri Party member
  - Justice Party (South Korea) - some Uri Party member
