= Ministry of Unification =

Government ministry of South Korea

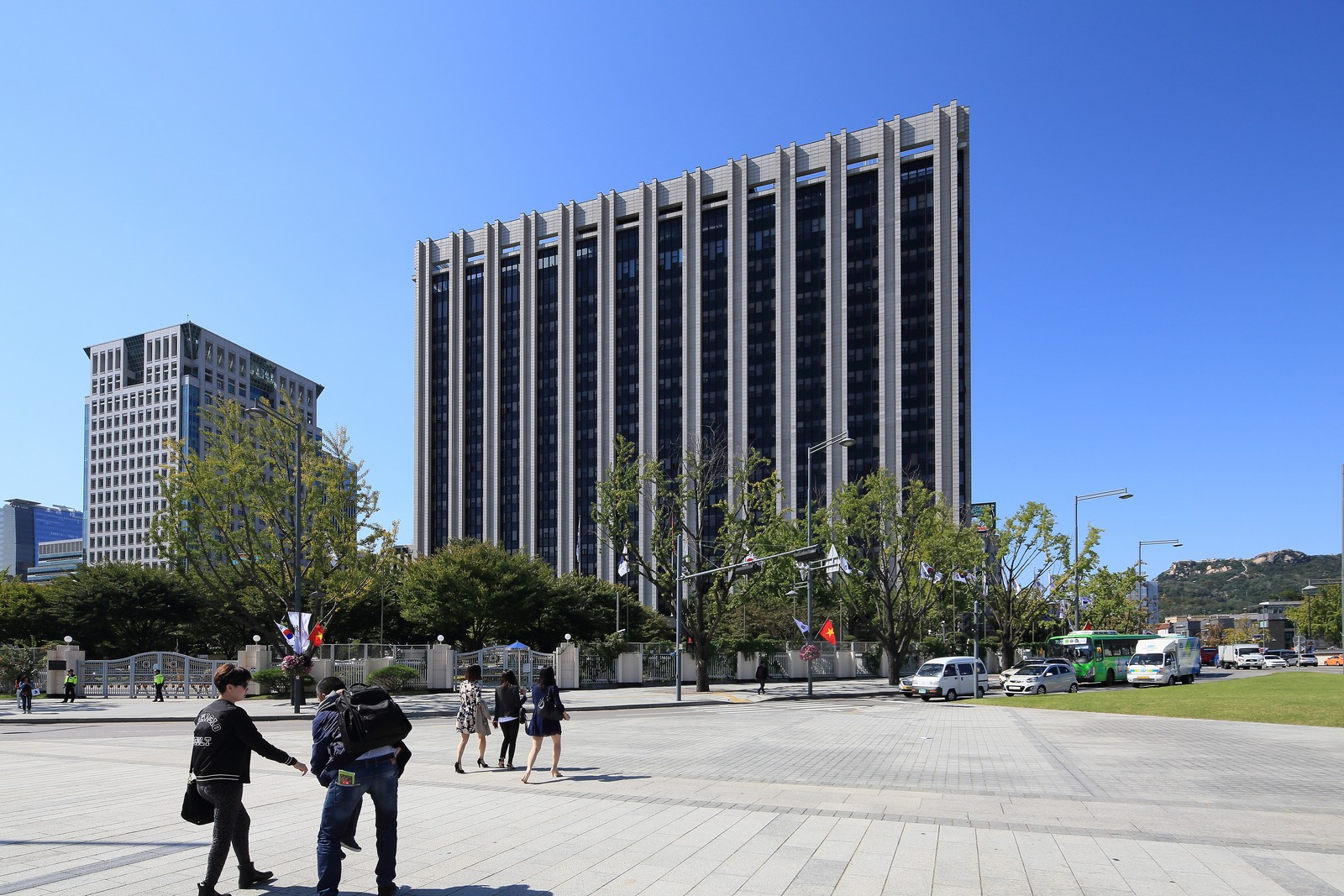
- MOU headquarters in Seoul

Agency overview
- Formed: March 1, 1969
- Preceding agency: National Unification Board (1969–1998)
- Jurisdiction: Government of South Korea
- Headquarters: Jongno-gu, Seoul; 37°34′29.586″N 126°58′32.632″E
- Minister responsible: Chung Dong-young, Minister
- Deputy Minister responsible: Kim So-kyeong, Vice Minister
- Website: www.unikorea.go.kr/web/eng_unikorea/main (in English); www.unikorea.go.kr/web/unikorea/main (in Korean)

Map
- Ministry of Unification (Seoul)

Korean name
- Hangul: 통일부
- Hanja: 統一部
- RR: Tongilbu
- MR: T'ongilbu

The Ministry of Unification (Korean: 통일부) is an executive department of the South Korean government aimed at promoting Korean reunification. It was first established in 1969 as the National Unification Board, under the rule of Park Chung Hee. It gained its current status in 1998 and has played a major role in promoting inter-Korean dialogues, exchanges and cooperation. Its headquarters are on the third and fourth floors of the Seoul Government Complex in Jongno District, Seoul.

== History ==
- National Unification Board (Korean: 국토통일원) (1969–1990)
- Unification Board (Korean: 통일원) (1990–1998)
- Ministry of Unification (Korean: 통일부) (1998–present)

The Ministry of Unification takes charge of overall unification matters, including formulating policies on unification, inter-Korean dialogue, exchanges, cooperation, and humanitarian assistance; analyzing North Korea's situation; providing unification education; and promoting unification.

Under previous minister Yu Woo-ik, the ministry consisted of one office for planning and coordination; three bureaus for unification policy, inter-Korean exchanges and cooperation, and humanitarian cooperation; one special bureau for the Gaeseong Industrial Complex project; and five affiliated agencies on unification education, inter-Korean dialogue, transit between the South and the North, settlement support for dislocated North Koreans and inter-Korean consultations on exchanges and cooperation. However, in 2008, the ministry was significantly downsized as part of an efficiency restructuring of government.

During the Park Geun-hye administration, the MOU has assigned nine core tasks and three cooperative tasks in order to settle peace and establish a foundation for a unified Korea considering the security circumstances and national consensus.

During the Moon Jae-in administration, the MOU had initiated several tasks to ease the tension with North Korea. Initiatives and plans including Asian Highway 1 and AH6 highway, Trans-Korean Main Line. Also, Pyongyang and Seoul agreed to build a liaison office in Kaesong, nearby Kaesong Industrial Region.

== Logo ==
?-1998

1998-2005

2005-2016

2016-present

== Organization ==
The minister is supported by one vice-minister.

=== Affiliated organization ===
- Inter-Korean Liaison Office
- National Institute for Unification Education
- Inter-Korean Transit Office
- Center for Unified Korean Future
- North Korean Human Rights Records Center
- Inter-Korean relations Management Corps

=== Related organization ===
- Korea Hana Foundation
- South-North Korea Exchanges and Cooperation Support Association
- Gaeseong Industrial District Foundation
- Gyeoremalkeunsajeon Committee
- Peaceful Unification Advisory Council

== Objectives ==
=== Lee Myung Bak administration ===
The ministry's aims as of 2008 were:

=== Responsibilities ===
According to the Ministry website, its major duties are as follows:

- Establishing North Korea Policy: The ministry coordinates the South Korean government's policy toward North Korea and establishes and implements long-term policies for national unification. The ministry encourages public participation in the overall process. To effectively pursue unification policies, the ministry analyzes the political, socioeconomic and military aspects of North Korea.
- Coordinating inter-Korean dialogue: As the chief government body tasked with communicating with North Korea, the Ministry of Unification coordinates inter-Korean dialogue at all levels in the political, economic, military and humanitarian areas.
- Pursuing inter-Korean cooperation: In addition, the ministry sets the rules and procedures for inter-Korean economic cooperation including those governing Mt. Geumgang tour, Gaeseong industrial complex and reconnection of inter-Korean roads and railways and various exchange programs in the athletic, cultural and academic areas. This includes the pursuit of humanitarian cooperation on human rights conditions in North Korea, South Korean POW and abductee issues, reunion of separated families, settlement support for dislocated North Koreans and cross-border exchanges of goods and people alongside the inter-Korean roads and railways.
- Educating the public on unification. The ministry often enlists the services of local NGOs to provide educational information to people throughout Korea.

=== Vision ===
1. Creating a Community for Peace: It will denuclearize the Korean peninsula, build military trust between South and North Korea and reduce tension on the peninsula.
2. Creating a Community for Common Prosperity: The Lee government will help North Korea develop its economy and participate in the international community and pursue an economic cooperation that will benefit both Koreas.
3. Creating a Community for Happiness: It will enhance the well-being of the 70 million South and North Koreans by resolving humanitarian issues between the two Koreas and raising the quality of life for all Koreans.

=== Guiding principles ===
The Hong Yong-pyo administration is guided by four principles: a balanced approach; North Korea policy that evolves over time; and cooperation with the international community.

1. A balance between ‘national security and exchange/cooperation’ and ‘inter-Korean cooperation and international cooperation’ will be struck: remain flexible where appropriate, yet firm when necessary, in order to closely coordinate the critical factors which constitute our policy towards North Korea.
2. Encourage North Korea to make “the right choice” and move closer towards meaningful cross-border interaction by continuously complementing and revising our policies toward the North; North Korean policies will remain responsive and vigilant with regards to developments in our surrounding regional neighborhood in order to ensure robust and proactive management of the situation on the Korean Peninsula.
3. Close consultation and cooperation with the international community, we will resolve the security crisis on the Korean Peninsula; seek to establish a virtuous cycle between the resolution of issues on the Korean Peninsula and increased peace and collaboration in Northeast Asia.

=== Major tasks ===
1. All issues between the two Koreas should be resolved through dialogue. We will engage in productive dialogue with the North to resolve all pending issues with sincerity. The leaders of the two Koreas may meet any time if they do so in good faith with the goal of unification and a better life for all 70 million Koreans.
2. It will continue to encourage North Korea to give up its nuclear programs through the Six-party Talks. The Lee administration will call for a peaceful resolution of the North Korean nuclear issue during inter-Korean dialogue.
3. It will achieve qualitative development of inter-Korean relations through mutually beneficial economic cooperation between the two Koreas. Existing economic cooperation projects will be promoted by removing obstacles. New projects will be pursued according to the four criteria: progress in North Korea's denuclearization, economic feasibility, our financial capability and national consensus. The Lee administration will implement the Vision 3000: Denuclearization and Openness to create an inter-Korean economic community.
4. Social and cultural exchanges will be expanded to develop a sense of national commonality. An institutional foundation will be laid to ensure a substantial and stable development of social and cultural exchanges.
5. The former Lee administration will remain strongly committed to the resolution of the humanitarian issues. We will find fundamental solutions to the separate family issue and give a priority to the resolution of the South Korean POW and abductee issues as they are our citizens whom the government should protect. We will deal with human rights in North Korea as a matter of universal value. The ROK government will provide humanitarian aid to North Korea unconditionally from a humanitarian perspective and in the spirit of brotherhood toward fellow North Koreans.

== List of ministers ==
As of 2025, the Minister of Unification is Chung Dong-young.

== See also ==
- Committee for the Peaceful Reunification of the Fatherland – similar organization in North Korea (existed until 2024)
- Division of Korea
- Foreign relations of South Korea
- Government of South Korea
- Information Center on North Korea
- Minister of Intra-German Relations — similar organization in West Germany
- National Unification Advisory Council
- Taiwan Affairs Office — similar organization in Mainland China
- Mainland Affairs Council — similar organization in Taiwan
- State Ministry for Reconciliation and Civic Equality of Georgia — similar organization in Georgia
- Ministry of Temporarily Occupied Territories and IDPs — similar organization in Ukraine
