= Minister of Education (South Korea) =

South Korean government position

- Emblem of the Government of South Korea

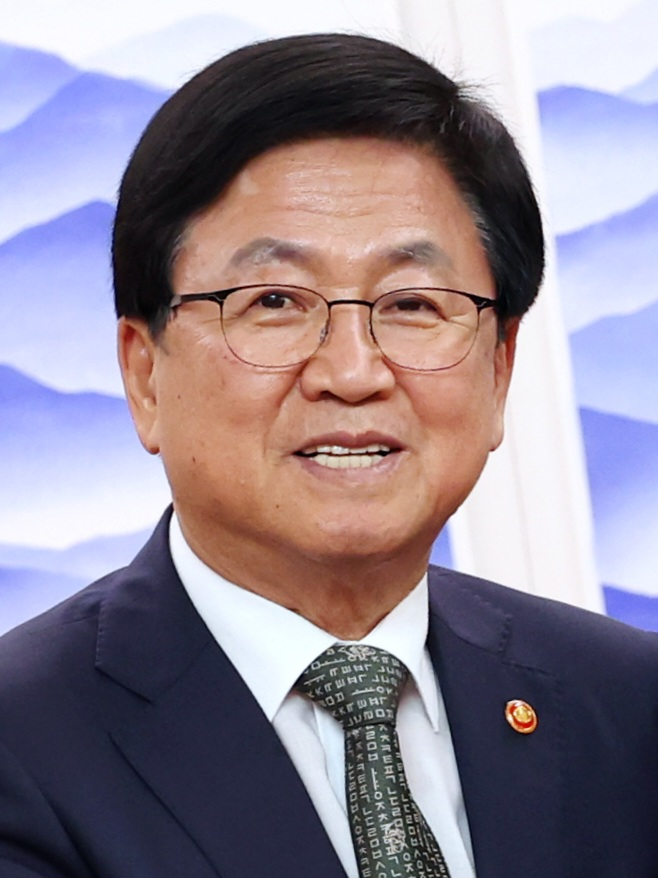
- Incumbent; Choi Kyo-jin since 11 September 2025
- Ministry of Education
- Style: His Excellency
- Member of: Cabinet of South Korea
- Reports to: President of South Korea
- Appointer: President of South Korea with approbation of the South Korea National Assembly

The minister of education (Korean: 교육부 장관) of South Korea is the leader and chief executive of the Ministry of Education and a member of the State Council. The president nominates the minister of education upon the recommendation of the prime minister. All minister nominees are required to undergo congressional confirmation hearings, though the consent of the National Assembly is only necessary for the Prime Minister.

In January 2001, the Ministry of Education was reformed into the Ministry of Education & Human Resources Development; in February 2008, it was merged with the Ministry of Science & Technology to form the Ministry of Education, Science & Technology. In March 2013, the Ministry of Education, Science & Technology was split into the current Ministry of Education and the Ministry of Science, ICT and Future Planning.

In South Korea, the offices of the two deputy prime ministers are held by a member of the State Council. The minister of education and human resources development held the position of deputy prime minister from 2001 to 2008, during the Kim Dae-jung and Roh Moo-hyun administrations. From 2014 to 2025, during the Park Geun-hye, Moon Jae-in, and Yoon Suk Yeol administrations, the minister of education held the position of deputy prime minister.

== List ==
=== Minister of Education (1948–2001) ===
No.	Portrait	Name	Term of office			President
No.	Portrait	Name	Took office	Left office	Time in office	President
1		Ahn Ho-sang 안호상 安浩相 (1902–1999)	3 August 1948	3 May 1950	1 year, 273 days	Syngman Rhee
2		Baek Nak-jun 백낙준 白樂濬 (1895–1985)	4 May 1950	29 October 1952	2 years, 178 days	Syngman Rhee
3		Kim Beop-rin 김법린 金法麟 (1899–1964)	30 October 1952	20 April 1954	1 year, 172 days	Syngman Rhee
4		Lee Seon-geun 이선근 李瑄根 (1905–1983)	21 April 1954	7 June 1956	2 years, 47 days	Syngman Rhee
5		Choi Kyu-nam 최규남 崔奎南 (1898–1992)	8 June 1956	26 November 1957	1 year, 171 days	Syngman Rhee
6		Choi Jae-yu 최재유 崔在裕 (1906–1993)	27 November 1957	27 April 1960	2 years, 152 days	Syngman Rhee
7		Yi Pyong Do 이병도 李丙燾 (1896–1989)	28 April 1960	22 August 1960	116 days	Yun Po-sun
8		Oh Cheon-seok 오천석 吳天錫 (1901–1987)	23 August 1960	2 May 1961	252 days	Yun Po-sun
9		Yoon Taek-joong 윤택중 尹宅重 (1913–2002)	3 May 1961	19 May 1961	16 days	Yun Po-sun
10		Mun Hui-seok 문희석 文凞奭 (1922–1977)	20 May 1961	18 January 1962	243 days	Yun Po-sun
11		Kim Sang-hyup 김상협 金相浹 (1920–1995	19 January 1962	14 October 1962	268 days	Yun Po-sun
11		Kim Sang-hyup 김상협 金相浹 (1920–1995	19 January 1962	14 October 1962	268 days	Park Chung Hee (acting)
12		Park Il-kyung 박일경 朴一慶 (1920–1994)	15 October 1962	15 March 1963	151 days	Park Chung Hee (acting)
13		Lee Jong-woo 이종우 李鍾雨 (1903–1974)	16 March 1963	16 December 1963	275 days	Park Chung Hee (acting)
14		Kauh Kwang-man 고광만 高光萬 (1904–1994)	17 December 1963	10 May 1964	145 days	Park Chung Hee
15		Yoon Cheon-joo 윤천주 尹天柱 (1921–2001)	11 May 1964	26 August 1965	1 year, 107 days	Park Chung Hee
16		Gwon O-byeong 권오병 權五柄 (1918–1975)	27 August 1965	25 September 1966	1 year, 29 days	Park Chung Hee
17		Moon Hong-joo 문홍주 文鴻柱 (1918–2008)	26 September 1966	20 May 1968	1 year, 237 days	Park Chung Hee
18		Gwon O-byeong 권오병 權五柄 (1918–1975)	21 May 1968	10 April 1969	324 days	Park Chung Hee
19		Hong Jong-cheol 홍종철 洪鍾哲 (1924–1974)	11 April 1969	3 June 1971	2 years, 53 days	Park Chung Hee
20		Min Kwan-shik 민관식 閔寬植 (1918–2006)	4 June 1971	17 September 1974	3 years, 105 days	Park Chung Hee
21		Ryu Ki-chun 유기춘 柳基春 (1922–1982)	18 September 1974	3 December 1976	2 years, 76 days	Park Chung Hee
22		Hwang San-deok 황산덕 黃山德 (1917–1989)	4 December 1976	19 December 1977	1 year, 15 days	Park Chung Hee
23		Park Chan-hyun 박찬현 朴瓚鉉 (1917–1991)	20 December 1977	13 December 1979	1 year, 358 days	Park Chung Hee
24		Kim Ok-gil 김옥길 金玉吉 (1921–1990)	14 December 1979	21 May 1980	159 days	Choi Kyu-hah
25		Lee Kyu-ho 이규호 李奎浩 (1926–2002)	22 May 1980	14 October 1983	3 years, 145 days	Choi Kyu-hah
25		Lee Kyu-ho 이규호 李奎浩 (1926–2002)	22 May 1980	14 October 1983	3 years, 145 days	Chun Doo-hwan
26		Kwon Lee-hyuk 권이혁 權彛赫 (1923–2020)	15 October 1983	18 February 1985	1 year, 126 days	Chun Doo-hwan
27		Sohn Jae-suk 손제석 孫製錫 (1931–2016)	19 February 1985	13 July 1987	2 years, 144 days	Chun Doo-hwan
28		Suhr Myong-won 서명원 徐明源 (1919–2006)	14 July 1987	24 February 1988	225 days	Chun Doo-hwan
29		Kim Young-shik 김영식 金永植 (1930–2022)	25 February 1988	4 December 1988	283 days	Roh Tae-woo
30		Chung Won-shik 정원식 鄭元植 (1928–2020)	5 December 1988	26 December 1990	2 years, 21 days	Roh Tae-woo
31		Yoon Hyeong-seob 윤형섭 尹亨燮 (born 1933)	27 December 1990	22 January 1992	1 year, 26 days	Roh Tae-woo
32		Jo Wan-kyu 조완규 趙完圭 (1928–2026)	23 January 1992	25 February 1993	1 year, 33 days	Roh Tae-woo
33		Oh Byung-mun 오병문 吳炳文 (1928–2010)	26 February 1993	21 December 1993	298 days	Kim Young-sam
34		Kim Sook-hee 김숙희 金淑喜 (born 1937)	22 December 1993	11 May 1995	1 year, 140 days	Kim Young-sam
35		Park Young-sik 박영식 朴煐植 (1934–2013)	16 May 1995	20 December 1995	218 days	Kim Young-sam
36		An Byung-young 안병영 安秉永 (born 1941)	21 December 1995	5 August 1997	1 year, 227 days	Kim Young-sam
37		Lee Myung-hyun 이명현 李明賢 (born 1942)	6 August 1997	2 March 1998	208 days	Kim Young-sam
38		Lee Hae-chan 이해찬 李海瓚 (1952–2026)	3 March 1998	23 May 1999	1 year, 81 days	Kim Dae-jung
39		Kim Deok-jung 김덕중 金德中 (1934–2025)	24 May 1999	13 January 2000	234 days	Kim Dae-jung
40		Moon Yong-lin 문용린 文龍鱗 (1947–2023)	14 January 2000	5 August 2000	204 days	Kim Dae-jung
41		Song Ja 송자 宋梓 (1936–2019)	7 August 2000	29 August 2000	22 days	Kim Dae-jung
42		Lee Don-hee 이돈희 李敦熙 (born 1937)	31 August 2000	28 January 2001	150 days	Kim Dae-jung

=== Minister of Education & Human Resources Development (2001–2008) ===
No.	Portrait	Name	Term of office			President
No.	Portrait	Name	Took office	Left office	Time in office	President
43		Han Wan-sang 한완상 韓完相 (born 1936)	29 January 2001	28 January 2002	364 days	Kim Dae-jung
44		Lee Sang-joo 이상주 李相周 (1937–2023)	29 January 2002	5 March 2003	1 year, 35 days	Kim Dae-jung
45		Yoon Deok-hong 윤덕홍 尹德弘 (born 1947)	7 March 2003	23 December 2003	291 days	Roh Moo-hyun
46		An Byung-young 안병영 安秉永 (born 1941)	24 December 2003	4 January 2005	1 year, 11 days	Roh Moo-hyun
47		Lee Ki-jun 이기준 李基俊 (1938–2025)	5 January 2005	10 January 2005	5 days	Roh Moo-hyun
48		Kim Jin-pyo 김진표 金振杓 (born 1947)	28 January 2005	20 July 2006	1 year, 173 days	Roh Moo-hyun
49		Kim Byong-joon 김병준 金秉準 (born 1954)	21 July 2006	8 August 2006	18 days	Roh Moo-hyun
50		Kim Shin-il 김신일 金信一 (born 1941)	9 August 2006	28 February 2008	1 year, 203 days	Roh Moo-hyun

=== Minister of Education, Science, and Technology (2008–2013) ===
No.	Portrait	Name	Term of office			President
No.	Portrait	Name	Took office	Left office	Time in office	President
51		Kim Do-yeon 김도연 金道然 (born 1952)	29 February 2008	5 August 2008	2 years, 24 days	Lee Myung-bak
52		Ahn Byong-man 안병만 安秉萬 (1941–2022)	6 August 2008	30 August 2010	2 years, 24 days	Lee Myung-bak
53		Lee Ju-ho 이주호 李周浩 (born 1961)	30 August 2010	10 March 2013	2 years, 192 days	Lee Myung-bak
54		Seo Nam-soo 서남수 徐南洙 (born 1952)	11 March 2013	22 March 2013	164 days	Park Geun-hye

=== Minister of Education (2013–present) ===
No.	Portrait	Name	Term of office			President
No.	Portrait	Name	Took office	Left office	Time in office	President
55		Seo Nam-soo 서남수 徐南洙 (born 1952)	23 March 2013	7 August 2014	1 year, 137 days	Park Geun-hye
56		Hwang Woo-yea 황우여 黃祐呂 (born 1947)	8 August 2014	12 January 2016	1 year, 157 days	Park Geun-hye
57		Lee Joon-sik 이준식 李俊植 (born 1952)	13 January 2016	4 July 2017	1 year, 172 days	Park Geun-hye
58		Kim Sang-gon 김상곤 金相坤 (born 1949)	5 July 2017	2 October 2018	1 year, 89 days	Moon Jae-in
59		Yoo Eun-hae 유은혜 兪銀惠 (born 1962)	2 October 2018	9 May 2022	3 years, 219 days	Moon Jae-in
60		Park Soon-ae 박순애 朴順愛 (born 1965)	5 July 2022	8 August 2022	34 days	Yoon Suk-yeol
61		Lee Ju-ho 이주호 李周浩 (born 1961)	7 November 2022	29 July 2025	2 years, 264 days	Yoon Suk-yeol
62		Choi Kyo-jin 최교진 崔敎振 (born 1953)	11 September 2025	incumbent	361 days	Lee Jae Myung

== See also ==
- Ministry of Education (South Korea)
