= List of Korea University presidents =

List of presidents of Korea University

The following is a list of all principals and presidents of Korea University from its founding as Bosung College in 1905.

== Bosung College ==
No.	Image	Name	Hangul name	Term
1		Sin Haeyŏng	신해영	1905 April–1907 December
2		Yu Sŏngjun	유성준	1907 December–1908 January
3		Sin Haeyŏng	신해영	1908 February–1909 February
4		Chŏng Yŏngt'aek	정영택	1909 February–1910 July
5		Yun Iksŏn	윤익선	1911 January–1919 August
6		Ko Wŏnhun	고원훈	1920 March–1923 November
7		Ho Hon	허헌	1923 November–1924 August
8		Yu Sŏngjun	유성준	1924 December–1925 July
9		Pak Sŭngbin	박승빈	1925 September–1932 June
10		Kim Seong-su	김성수	1932 June–1935 May
11		Kim Yong-mu	김용무	1935 August–1937 May
12		Kim Seong-su	김성수	1937 May–1946
13		Hyeon Sang-yun	현상윤	1946 February–1946 August

== Korea University ==
No.	Image	Name	Hangul name	Term
1		Hyeon Sang-yun	현상윤	1946 August–1950 October
2–4		Yu Jin-o	유진오	1952 September–1965 October
5		Lee Jong-u	이종우	1965 October–1970 September
6		Kim Sang-hyup	김상협	1970 October–1975 April
7		Cha Rhak-Hoon	차락훈	1975 June–1977 August
8		Kim Sang-hyup	김상협	1977 August–1982 July
9		Kim Jun-yop	김준엽	1982 July–1985 February
10–11		Lee Jun-beom	이준범	1985 March–1989 June
12		Kim Hui-jip	김희집	1990 June–1994 June
13		Hong Il-sik	홍일식	1994 June–1998 June
14		Kim Jung-bae	김정배	1998 June–2002 June
Acting		Han Sung-joo	한승주	2002 June–2003 February
15		Euh Yoon-dae	어윤대	2003 February–2006 December
16		Lee Phil Sang	이필상	2006 December–2007 February
Acting		Han Sung-joo	한승주	2007 March–2008 January
17		Lee Ki-Su	이기수	2008 February–2011 February
18		Kim Byoung-Chul	김병철	2011 March–2015 February
19		Yeom Jaeho	염재호	2015 March–2019 February
20		Jung Jin-Taek	정진택	2019 March–2023 February
21		Kim Dong-one	김동원	Current

== See also ==
- List of Seoul National University presidents
- List of Yonsei University presidents
- List of KAIST presidents
