= Park Byeong-seug =

South Korean politician

The Right Honourable Park Byeong-seug
- 박병석
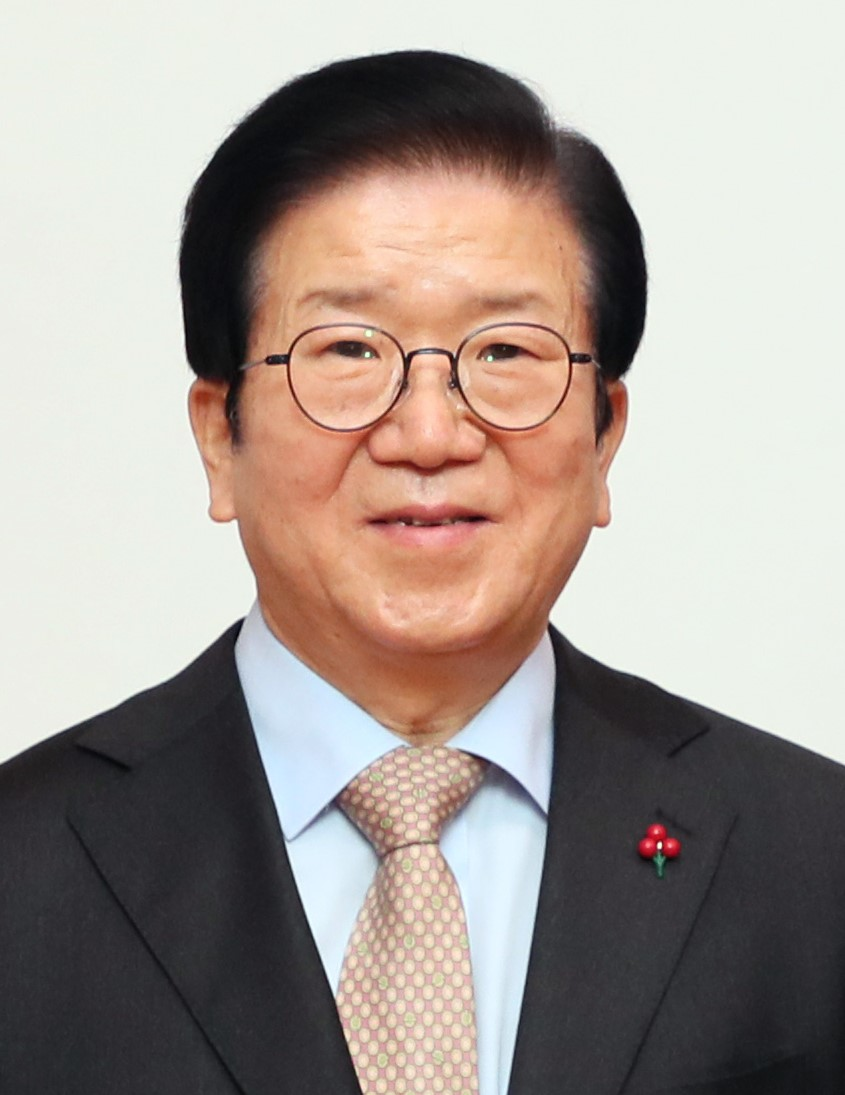

Speaker of the National Assembly
- In office 5 June 2020 – 29 May 2022
- Deputy: Kim Sang-hee; Chung Jin-suk
- Preceded by: Moon Hee-sang
- Succeeded by: Kim Jin-pyo

Deputy Speaker of the National Assembly
- In office 1 July 2012 – 29 May 2014; Serving with Lee Byeong-seok
- Preceded by: Chung Ui-hwa; Hong Jae-hyung
- Succeeded by: Jeong Kab-yoon; Lee Seok-hyun

Member of the National Assembly
- In office 30 May 2000 – 29 May 2024
- Preceded by: Lee Won-beom
- Succeeded by: Chang Jong-tae
- Constituency: Daejeon Seo A

Deputy Mayor for Political Affairs of Seoul
- In office 11 August 1999 – 12 February 2000
- President: Go Kun, Mayor
- Preceded by: Shin Kye-ryoon
- Succeeded by: Tak Byung-oh

Personal details
- Born: 25 January 1952 (age 74) Daejeon, South Chungcheong, South Korea
- Party: Democratic (2022–present)
- Other political affiliations: NCNP (1998–2000); MDP (2000–2003); Uri (2003–2007); UNDP (2007–2008); UDP (2008); Democratic (2008–2011); DUP (2011–2013); Democratic (2013–2014); NPAD (2014–2015); Democratic (2015–2020); Independent (2020–2022)
- Spouse: Han Myung-hui
- Children: 2
- Education: Sungkyunkwan University; Hanyang University
- Occupation: Politician

Korean name
- Hangul: 박병석
- RR: Bak Byeongseok
- MR: Pak Pyŏngsŏk

Park Byeong-seug (Korean: 박병석; born 25 January 1952) is a South Korean politician and former broadcaster. He has been the Member of the National Assembly for Daejon Seo A constituency since 2000. He used to be the Deputy Speaker of the National Assembly (2012–2014) and the Deputy Mayor for Political Affairs of Seoul (1999–2000).

== Early life and education ==
Park Byeong-seug was born in Daejeon, South Chungcheong (now separated from the province) in 1952. He graduated from Sungkyunkwan University with a Bachelor in Law. He also obtained a doctorate in mass communication at Hanyang University.

== Career ==
He joined JoongAng Ilbo in 1985, where he used to be a correspondent in Hong Kong, the Head of Department of Industry, the Head of Department of Economy and the Director of Editorial Department. During the Tiananmen Square protests in 1989, he reported the detention of the General Secretary of the Communist Party Zhao Ziyang.

Prior to the 1997 presidential election, Park joined the National Congress for New Politics (NCNP) instead of the Alliance of Liberal Democrats (ALDE) despite the strong support for the ALDE in his region. He was appointed the top spokesperson of the NCNP in 1998. In 1999, he was appointed the Deputy Mayor for Political Affairs of Seoul by the then Mayor Goh Kun, following the resignation of Shin Kye-ryoon in order to run for the upcoming general election. He resigned in 2000 to run for the general election in April.

Park has been the Member of the National Assembly for Daejeon West 1st constituency since 2000. On 4 June 2012, following the 2012 election, he contested the DUP preselection for the Deputy Speaker of the National Assembly and defeated Lee Seok-hyun with a margin 86–41. He was elected to the position on 2 July.

Following the 2016 election, Park contested to be the Speaker but came behind to Chung Sye-kyun and Moon Hee-sang. In 2018, he unsuccessfully ran again for the position, defeated by Moon Hee-sang with a margin 67–47. After the outright victory of the Democratic Party in 2020 election, he automatically became the sole 6-term MP, in which he was widely expected to be the Speaker without any preselections. On 25 May, he was confirmed as the Speaker by the Democratic Party. On 5 June, he was officially inaugurated as the new Speaker.

== Personal life ==
Park married to Han Myung-hui and has 2 sons. He is able to communicate in Standard Chinese.

== Election results ==
Year	Elections	Constituency	Political party	Votes (%)	Remarks
2000	16th National Assembly General Election	Daejeon Seo A	Millennium Democratic	28,538 (37.45%)	Won
2004	17th National Assembly General Election	Daejeon Seo A	Uri	49,194 (51.75%)	Won
2008	18th National Assembly General Election	Daejeon Seo A	United Democratic	32,626 (41.29%)	Won
2012	19th National Assembly General Election	Daejeon Seo A	Democratic United	53,671 (54.53%)	Won
2016	20th National Assembly General Election	Daejeon Seo A	Democratic	56,241 (48.66%)	Won
2020	21st National Assembly General Election	Daejeon Seo A	Democratic	74,978 (55.58%)	Won

== Notes ==
Political offices
Preceded by Moon Hee-sang	Speaker of the National Assembly of South Korea; 5 June 2020–29 May 2022	Succeeded by Kim Jin-pyo
Preceded by Chung Ui-hwa; Hong Jae-hyung	Deputy Speaker of the National Assembly; Serving with Lee Byung-suk; 2 July 2012–29 May 2016	Succeeded by Jeong Gap-yun; Lee Seok-hyun
Preceded by Shin Gye-ryun	Deputy Mayor for Political Affairs Seoul; 11 August 1999–12 February 2000	Succeeded by Tak Byeong-oh
National Assembly of the Republic of Korea
Preceded by Lee Won-beom	Member of the National Assembly from Seo A (Daejeon); 30 May 2000–29 May 2024	Succeeded by Chang Jong-tae
