= Lee Ju-ho =

South Korean politician (born 1961)

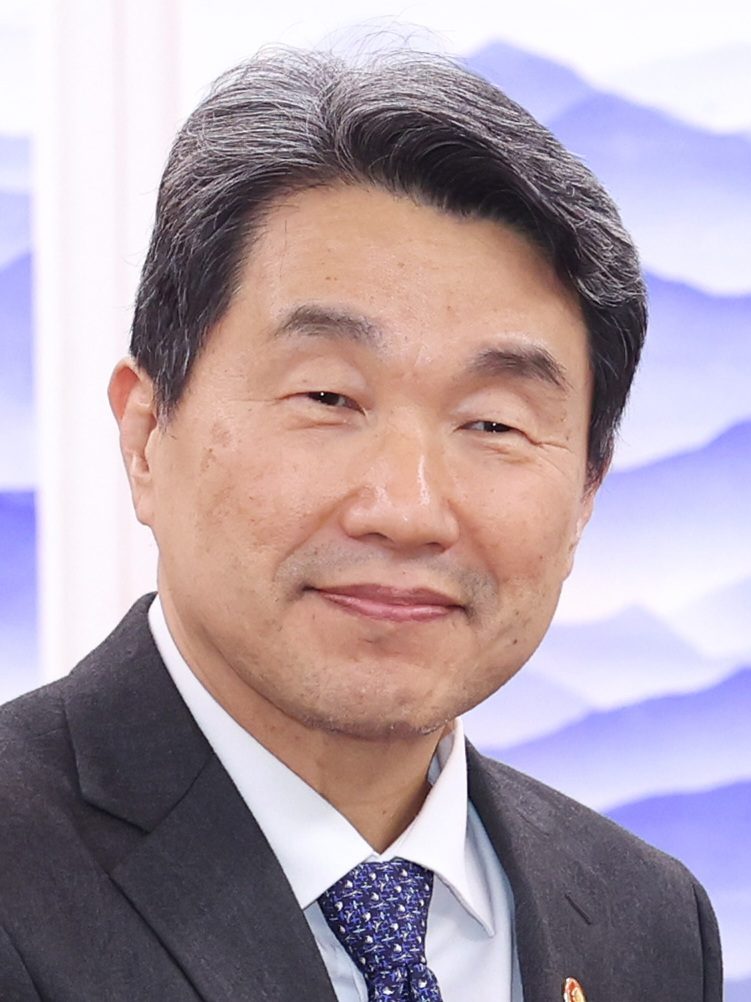
- Lee in 2024

Acting President of South Korea
- In office 2 May 2025 – 4 June 2025
- Prime Minister: Himself (acting)
- Preceded by: Han Duck-soo (acting)
- Succeeded by: Lee Jae Myung

Acting Prime Minister of South Korea
- In office 2 May 2025 – 4 July 2025
- President: Himself (acting); Lee Jae Myung
- Deputy: Himself
- Preceded by: Han Duck-soo
- Succeeded by: Kim Min-seok

Deputy Prime Minister and Minister of Education
- In office 7 November 2022 – 29 July 2025
- Prime Minister: Han Duck-soo; Choi Sang-mok (acting); Han Duck-soo; Himself (acting); Kim Min-seok
- Preceded by: Park Soon-ae
- Succeeded by: Choi Kyo-jin

Minister of Education, Science and Technology
- In office 31 August 2010 – 11 March 2013
- President: Lee Myung-bak; Park Geun-hye
- Prime Minister: Yoon Jeung-hyun (acting); Kim Hwang-sik; Chung Hong-won
- Preceded by: Ahn Byong-man
- Succeeded by: Seo Nam-soo

Member of the National Assembly
- In office 30 May 2004 – 29 May 2008
- Constituency: Proportional representation

Personal details
- Born: 17 February 1961 (age 65) Chilgok, North Gyeongsang, South Korea
- Party: Independent
- Other political affiliations: Grand National Party; Saenuri Party; Liberty Korea Party; United Future Party; People Power Party
- Spouse: Park Eun-jin (박은진)
- Education: Seoul National University (BA, MA); Cornell University (PhD)

Korean name
- Hangul: 이주호
- Hanja: 李周浩
- RR: I Juho
- MR: I Chuho

Lee Ju-ho (Korean: 이주호; born 17 February 1961) is a South Korean economist who served as the acting president of South Korea from May to June 2025 and acting prime minister of South Korea from May to July 2025. He also served as the deputy prime minister and education minister from 2022 to 2025.

He is a professor at the KDI School of Public Policy and Management. From 1 May 2025 to 4 June 2025, after the impeachment of president Yoon Suk Yeol, resignation of prime minister Han Duck-soo, and subsequent resignation of minister of economy Choi Sang-mok, Lee was the acting President of South Korea, acting Prime Minister, Deputy Prime Minister, and Minister of Education concurrently.

== Early life ==
Lee Joo-ho was born in Chilgok County, North Gyeongsang Province, South Korea on 17 February 1961.

Lee holds three degrees in economics – a bachelor's and a master's from Seoul National University and a doctorate from Cornell University.

== Early political career ==
He served as a Korea Development Institute professor before entering the 17th National Assembly as a proportional representative in 2004. In January 2009, he served as the First Vice Minister of Education, Science and Technology in the Lee Myung-bak government, and as Minister in 2010, serving in that role until 2013. He was appointed Minister once more in 2022 in the Yoon Suk Yeol government.

As minister, Lee oversaw several key education changes. He established the Neulbom School program, which provided free after-school care to young elementary students, and oversaw efforts to increase medical school enrollment by 2,000 seats, which ultimately failed. He also advocated for the use of digital textbooks, particularly artificial intelligence-based textbooks introduced this school year.

== Acting presidency and premiership (2025) ==
On 2 May 2025, Lee ascended to the presidency and the premiership, which came after the sudden resignations of the previous acting president and prime minister, Han Duck-soo and the deputy prime minister, Choi Sang-mok. The presidency itself was already vacant due to the impeachment of Yoon Suk Yeol. As acting president, Lee directed the military to elevate its preparedness posture to the "highest level," and called for meticulous preparations to ensure the "orderly" and "fair" conduct of the presidential election on June 3. Lee also directed acting Defense Minister Kim Seon-ho to thoroughly oversee military surveillance and readiness and to elevate the country's military preparedness posture to the highest level, to be able to respond "rapidly and sternly" to any and all types of provocations, also directing all public servants to maintain strict discipline when it came to their work and political neutrality ahead of the presidential election.

Lee acted as the prime minister until 4 July 2025, when Kim Min-seok's nomination for the position was confirmed.

== Election results ==
Year	Elections	Constituency	Political party	Votes (%)	Results
2004	17th National Assembly General Election	Proportional representation (12nd)	GNP	7,613,660 (35.76%)	Elected

Political offices
Preceded by Han Duck-soo; Acting	President of South Korea; Acting; 2025	Succeeded by Lee Jae Myung
Preceded by Han Duck-soo	Prime Minister of South Korea; Acting; 2025	Succeeded by Kim Min-seok
