= List of Ewha Womans University presidents =

List of presidents of Ewha Womans University

The following is a list of all principals and presidents of Ewha Womans University from its founding as Ewha Girls' High School in 1886.

No.	Image	Name	Hangul name	Term
1		Mary F. Scranton	메리 스크랜튼	1886–1890
2		Louisa C. Rothweiler	루이자 C. 로드와일러	1890–1892
3		Josephine O. Paine	조세핀 O. 페인	1892–1907
4		Lulu E. Frey	룰루 E. 프라이	1907–1921
5		A. Jeannette Walter	A. 진네트 월터	1921–1922
6		Alice Rebecca Appenzeller	앨리스 R. 아펜젤러	1922–1939
7		Kim Helen	김활란	1939–1961
8		Kim Ok-Gil	김옥길	1961–1979
9		Chung Ii-sook	정의숙	1979–1990
10		Yoon Hoo Jung	윤후정	1990–1996
11		Chang Sang	장상	1996–2002
12		Shin In-ryung	신인령	2002–2006
13		Lee Bae-yong	이배용	2006–2010
14		Kim Sunuk	김선욱	2010–2014
15		Choi Kyung-hee	최경희	2014–2016
16		Kim Hei-sook	김혜숙	2017–2021
17		Kim Eun Mee	김은미	2021–2025
18		Lee Hyang-sook	이향숙	2025–

== See also ==
- List of Seoul National University presidents
- List of Yonsei University presidents
