= List of Seoul National University presidents =

List of presidents of Seoul National University

The following is a list of all presidents of Seoul National University from its founding in 1946.

No.	Image	Name	Hangul name	Term
1		Harry Bidwell Ansted	해리 엔스테드	October 7, 1945 – October 24, 1947
2		Lee Chunho	이춘호	October 15, 1947 – May 12, 1948
3		Jang E-wook	장이욱	May 13, 1948 – January 3, 1949
4		Choi Kyou-dong	최규동	January 4, 1949 – October 5, 1950
5		Choi Kyu-nam	최규남	September 3, 1951 – June 8, 1956
6		Yun Il-seon	윤일선	July 19, 1956 – December 6, 1961
7		Kwon Joong-whi	권중휘	December 7, 1961 – June 8, 1964
8		Shin Tae-hwan	신태환	June 24, 1964 – August 26, 1965
9		Ryu Paul Kichyon	유기천	August 27, 1965 – November 10, 1966
10		Choi Mun-hwan	최문환	November 11, 1966 – November 10, 1970
11 & 12		Han Sim-suk	한심석	November 11, 1970 – June 26, 1975
13		Yoon Chun-joo	윤천주	May 27, 1975 – May 26, 1979
14		Koh Byong-ik	고병익	May 27, 1979 – June 29, 1980
15		Kwon E-hyock	권이혁	June 30, 1980 – October 14, 1983
16		Lee Hyun-jae	이현재	October 27, 1983 – July 20, 1985
17		Park Bong-shik	박봉식	July 22, 1985 – August 13, 1987
18		Cho Wan-kyoo	조완규	August 14, 1987 – August 13, 1991
19		Kim Chong-un	김종운	August 14, 1991 – February 28, 1995
20		Lee Soo-sung	이수성	March 1, 1995 – December 1, 1995
21		Seonu Jungho	선우중호	February 12, 1996 – August 31, 1998
22		Lee Ki-Jun	이기준	November 11, 1998 – May 9, 2002
23		Chung Un-chan	정운찬	July 20, 2002 – July 19, 2006
24		Lee Jang-moo	이장무	July 20, 2006 – July 19, 2010
25		Yeon Cheon Oh	오연천	July 20, 2010 – July 19, 2014
26		Sung Nak-in	성낙인	July 20, 2014 – July 19, 2018
Acting		Park Chanuk	박찬욱 (1954년)	July 20, 2018 – January 31, 2019
27		Oh Se-jung	오세정	February 1, 2019 – January 31, 2023
28		Ryu Hong Lim	유홍림	February 1, 2023 –

== See also ==
- List of Korea University presidents
- List of Yonsei University presidents
- List of KAIST presidents
- List of Ewha Womans University presidents
