= Lee Doo-hee =

South Korean politician and general

Minister of National Defense
- Acting
- In office 26 June 2025 – 25 July 2025
- President: Lee Jae Myung
- Prime Minister: Lee Ju-ho; Kim Min-seok
- Preceded by: Kim Seon-ho (acting)
- Succeeded by: Ahn Gyu-back

Deputy Minister of National Defense
- Incumbent
- Assumed office 26 June 2025
- President: Lee Jae Myung
- Prime Minister: Lee Ju-ho; Kim Min-seok
- Preceded by: Kim Seon-ho

Personal details
- Born: 1967 (age 58–59) Gyeongsan, South Korea
- Party: Independent
- Education: Korea Military Academy; Kyung Hee University

Military service
- Allegiance: South Korea
- Branch/service: Republic of Korea Army
- Years of service: 1990–2024
- Rank: Lieutenant general
- Commands: Missile Strategic Command

Lee Doo-hee (Korean: 이두희; Hanja: 李斗熙; born 1967) is a South Korean politician and retired Republic of Korea Army lieutenant general. An independent, he served as acting minister of national defense of South Korea from June 2025 to July 2025.
