= List of Yonsei University presidents =

List of presidents of Yonsei University

The following are lists of all presidents of Yonsei University, Yonhi College, and Severance Medical School.

== Yonsei University ==
No.	Image	Name Romanized	Name Hangul	Term
1		Baek Nak-jun	백낙준	1957 – 1959
2		Ko Byung Gan	고병간	December 1960 – September 1961
3			윤인구	November 1961 – August 1964
4 & 5 & 6		Park Dae Seon	박대선	September 1964 – April 1975
7 & 8		Lee Woo Joo	이우주	June 1975 – July 1980
9 & 10		Ahn Sae Hee	안세희	July 1980 – July 1988
11		Park Young Sik	박영식	August 1988 – July 1992
12		Song Ja	송자	August 1992 – July 1996
13		Kim Byung Soo	김병수	August 1996 – July 2000
14		Kim Woo Sik	김우식	August 2000 – February 2004
15		Jeong Chang Young	정창영	April 2004 – October 2007
16		Kim Han Joong	김한중	October 2007 – February 2012
17		Jeong Kap Young	정갑영	February 2012 – January 2016
18		Kim Yong Hak	김용학	February 2016 – January 2020
19		Suh Seoung Hwan	서승환	January 2020 – January 2024
20		Yoo Dong-Sup	윤동섭	February 2024 –

== Yonhi College ==
No.	Image	Name Romanized	Name Hangul	Term
1		Horace Grant Underwood	호러스 그랜트 언더우드	April 1915 – December 1916
2		Oliver R. Avison	올리버 R. 에이비슨	December 1916 – June 1934
3		Horace Horton Underwood	호러스 호턴 언더우드	September 1934 – December 1941
4		Yun Chi-ho	윤치호	December 1941 – August 1942
5		Yu Uk Gyum	유억겸	August 1945 – December 1945
6		Baek Nak-jun	백낙준	August 1946 – January 1957

== Severance Medical School ==
No.	Image	Name Romanized	Name Hangul	Term
1		Oliver R. Avison	올리버 R. 에이비슨	1893 – 1934
2		Oh Geung Seon	오긍선	1934 – 1941
3		Lee Young Jun	이영준	1941 – 1945
4		Choi Dong	최동	December 1941 – August 1942
5		Lee Yong Seul	이용설	1948 – 1952
6		Kim Myung Seon	김명선	1952 – 1957

== See also ==
- List of Seoul National University presidents
- List of Korea University presidents
- List of KAIST presidents
- List of Ewha Womans University presidents
