= Kim Jin-pyo (politician) =

South Korean politician

The Right Honourable Kim Jin-pyo MP
- 김진표
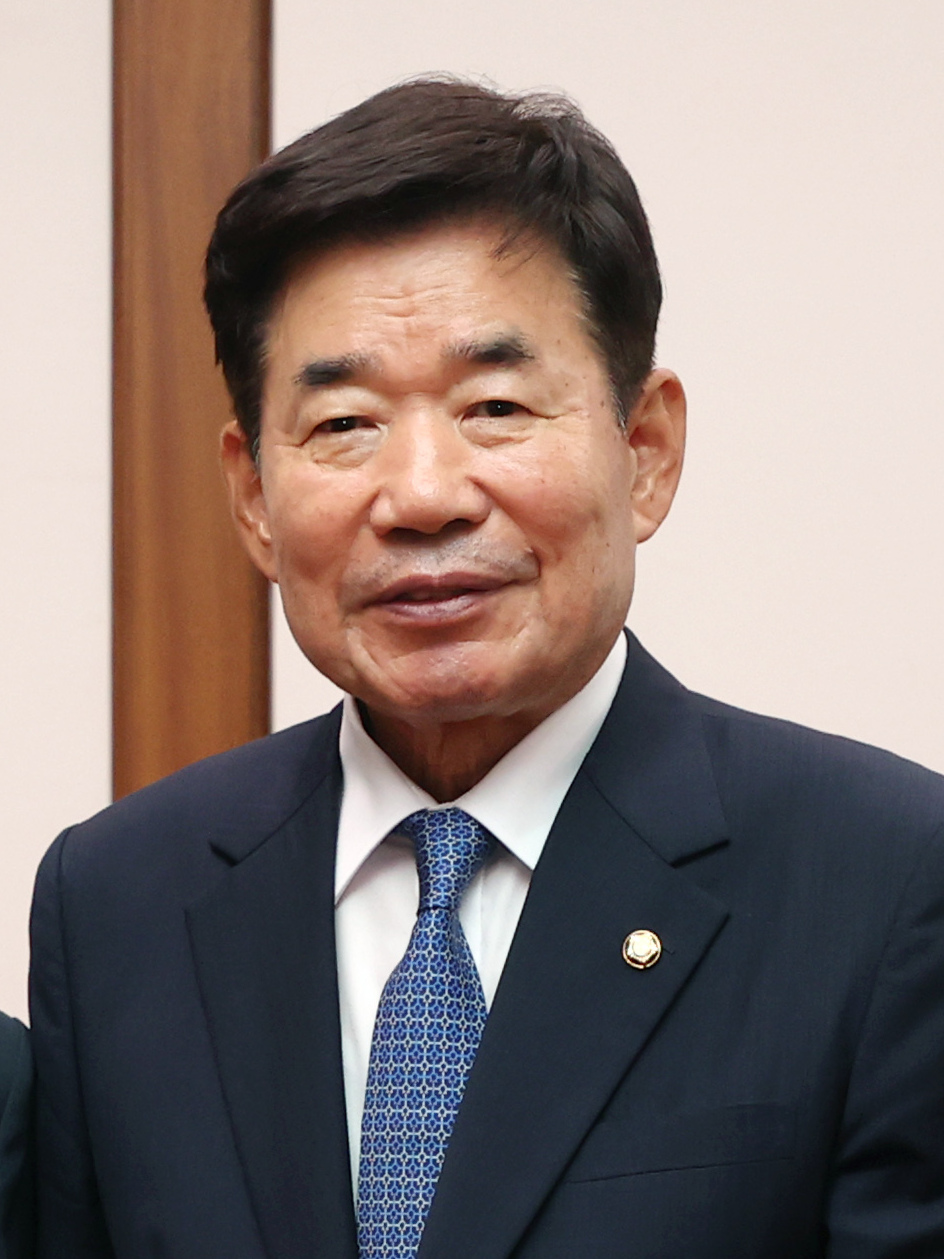
- Kim in 2022

Speaker of the National Assembly
- In office 4 July 2022 – 29 May 2024
- Deputy: Kim Young-joo; Chung Jin-suk; Chung Woo-taik
- Preceded by: Park Byeong-seug
- Succeeded by: Woo Won-shik

Member of the National Assembly
- In office 30 May 2016 – 29 May 2024
- Preceded by: Jung Mi-gyeong (Gyeonggi Suwon B); Park Kwang-on (Gyeonggi Suwon D)
- Succeeded by: Yeom Tae-young
- Constituency: Gyeonggi Suwon E (2016-2024)
- In office 30 May 2004 – 15 May 2014
- Preceded by: New constituency
- Succeeded by: Park Kwang-on
- Constituency: Gyeonggi Suwon Yeongtong (2004-2012); Gyeonggi Suwon D (2012-2014)

Floor Leader of the Democratic Party·Democratic United Party
- In office 30 May 2011 – 4 May 2012
- Preceded by: Park Jie-won
- Succeeded by: Park Jie-won
Ministerial offices
Deputy Prime Minister and Minister of Education and Human Resources Development
In office 28 January 2005 – 20 July 2006
President	Roh Moo-hyun
Prime Minister	Lee Hae-chan; Han Duck-soo (acting); Han Myeong-sook
Preceded by	Lee Ki-jun; Kim Young-shik (acting)
Succeeded by	Kim Byong-joon
Deputy Prime Minister and Minister of Finance and Economy
In office 27 February 2003 – 10 February 2004
President	Roh Moo-hyun
Prime Minister	Goh Kun
Preceded by	Jeon Yoon-chul
Succeeded by	Lee Hun-jai
Minister for Government Policy Coordination
In office 11 July 2002 – 26 February 2003
President	Kim Dae-jung; Roh Moo-hyun
Prime Minister	Chang Sang (acting); Jeon Yoon-chul (acting); Chang Dae-whan (acting); Kim Suk-soo
Preceded by	Kim Ho-shik
Succeeded by	Lee Young-tak

Personal details
- Born: 4 May 1947 (age 79) Yeonbaek County, Soviet Civil Administration
- Party: Democratic
- Education: Seoul National University (LLB); University of Wisconsin–Madison (MPA)

Kim Jin-pyo (Korean: 김진표; Hanja: 金振杓; born 4 May 1947) is a South Korean politician who previously served as a government minister under two liberal Presidents Kim Dae-jung and Roh Moo-hyun and has represented Suwon at the National Assembly since 2004. He has dedicated his career in public service as a public servant for 30 years and then as government minister and a parliamentarian. He belongs to the more conservative wing of the liberal Democratic Party.

== Pre-Minister career ==
After passing the state exam in 1974, he began his career as a public servant at one of regional offices of National Tax Service. Apart from working for Deputy Prime Minister Rha Woong-bae as his chief of staff for five months in 1996, he continued working on tax. He was part of a small task-force to prepare "real-name financial system" and one of nine people apart from then-President Kim Young-sam who knew about this before it was announced by the president.

Under President Kim Dae-jung, he led the Tax and Customs Office of the Ministry of Finance and Economy from 1991 and oversaw the implementation of newly-created "real-name real estate system." From 2001 he led the Ministry as its Vice-Minister. From January 2002, he worked on building country-wide High-speed Internet as Senior Presidential Secretary for Policy Planning (Korean: 대통령정책기획수석) and later appointed Minister for Government Policy Coordination.

In 2002 then-President-elect Roh Moo-hyun appointed him as vice chair of his transition team praising him as "the most capable public servant I have ever met."

== Member of State Council and National Assembly ==
Kim later became Roh's first Minister of Finance and Economy and ex officio Deputy Prime Minister in 2003. In 2004 he resigned for the 2004 general election upon Roh's recommendation. After successfully securing his seat at the parliament, he was brought back to Roh's cabinet as his Minister of Education and Human Resources Development and ex officio Deputy Prime Minister.

In 2007 he became the chair of Policy Planning Committee of his party, Uri Party, and its succeeding party, United New Democratic Party. From 2008 to 2010 he served as a member of his party's Supreme Council.

In 2010 he ran for his party's candidate for Gyeonggi Provincial Governor but dropped out after endorsing Rhyu Si-min from other liberal party.

In 2011 he was elected as the floor leader of this party which he continued to serve in succeeding party till 2012.

In the 2014 election, he resigned from the post of three-term parliamentarian to run as his party's candidate for Gyeonggi Governor but lost to Nam Kyung-pil from opposition party.

In 2015 he became a member of advisory committee to then-party leader Moon Jae-in. He organised the "policy exposition" of his party - the first of its kind in South Korean history.

In 2017 Kim joined Moon Jae-in's second presidential campaign in 2017 as the chair of its jobs committee.

Upon the beginning of Moon Jae-in's presidency, Kim was appointed as the chair of State Affairs Planning Advisory Committee (Korean: 국정기획자문위원회), Moon's de facto transition team, as Moon began his presidency without having one. The Committee produced detailed blueprint of Moon's 5-year administration with 100 policy tasks based on Moon's campaign promises.

Kim Jin-pyo was elected as the Speaker of the National Assembly to be occupied by the Democratic Party of Korea.

== Early life and education ==
Kim was born in Yeonbaek County, now North Korean territory. During the Third Battle of Seoul he and his father moved south and settled in now-Suwon. He was admitted to Kyungbock High School as top of his class.

He holds two degrees - LLB from Seoul National University where he completed his postgraduate programme on public policy and Master of Public Affairs from University of Wisconsin–Madison.

== Political positions ==
He belongs to the most conservative faction of Democratic Party of Korea. However, he was elected as the Speaker of the National Assembly with the support of the majority of DPK members. As the speaker of the National Assembly, he was criticized by various members of the party for putting the brakes on various policies promoted by the party without agreement with the party. He was rated more conservative than the center-right Bareun Party in a South Korean media survey.

He supports economic liberalism including real estate deregulation. He argued against the government's position that the sale price was disclosed in order to prevent the skyrocketing house price in the past, and argued that the disclosure of the sale price was socialism.

He also takes a socially conservative stance. He introduced the 'homosexuality healing movement' as one of the solutions to the low birth rate. He has strong opposition to homosexuality and same-sex marriage. In the past, he made remarks such as, "The religious world should promote childbirth, oppose abortion, and campaign against homosexuality and same-sex marriage in accordance with God's spirit of creation." Because of this position, some organizations have received claims that they "condemn hate against LGBTI people."

He has a very close relationship with the church and opposes taxing religious people. He said at a religious event in the past, "I think that only through theocracy can we regain the trust of the people and play the role of check and balance as an opposition party." It was pointed out that this remark violated the separation of church and state.

He influenced the withdrawal of the operating room CCTV installation, which is considered one of the reform legislation. He claimed to be in favor, but suddenly took a stance against it. Regarding this, it was criticized by several members of the party as "a breach of trust that betrays the will of sovereignty." According to an opinion poll, about 80% of Koreans supported the installation of CCTV in operating rooms.

== Electoral history ==
Election	Year	Post	Party affiliation	Votes	Percentage of votes	Results
17th General Election	2004	Member of National Assembly from Gyeonggi Suwon Yeongtong	Uri Party	49,155	48.34%	Won
18th General Election	2008	Member of National Assembly from Gyeonggi Suwon Yeongtong	Democratic Party (2008)	40,781	49.83%	Won
19th General Election	2012	Member of National Assembly from Gyeonggi Suwon D	Democratic United Party	68,274	61.02%	Won
6th Iocal Election	2014	Gyeonggi Provincial Governor	New Politics Alliance for Democracy	2,481,824	49.56%	Lost (2nd)
20th General Election	2016	Member of National Assembly from Gyeonggi Suwon E	Democratic Party of Korea	62,408	51.48%	Won
21st General Election	2020	Member of National Assembly from Gyeonggi Suwon E	Democratic Party of Korea	82,002	55.22%	Won

== Awards ==
- Turkmenistan : Order "Neutrality" (2023)

== See also ==
- Conservative Democrat (United States)

== Notes ==
Political offices
Preceded by Park Byeong-seug	Speaker of the National Assembly of South Korea; 4 July 2022–29 May 2024	Succeeded by Woo Won-shik
Preceded by Kim Ho-shik	Minister for Government Policy Coordination; 11 July 2002–26 February 2003	Succeeded by Lee Young-tak
Preceded by Jeon Yoon-chul	Deputy Prime Minister and Minister of Finance and Economy; 27 February 2003–10 February 2004	Succeeded by Lee Hun-jai
Preceded by Lee Ki-jun; Kim Young-shik (Acting)	Deputy Prime Minister and Minister of Education and Human Resources Development; 28 January 2005–20 July 2006	Succeeded by Kim Byong-joon
National Assembly of the Republic of Korea
Preceded by New Constituency	Member of the National Assembly from Suwon Yeongtong (Gyeonggi); 30 May 2004–29 May 2012	Succeeded by Himself (Suwon D, Gyeonggi)
Preceded by Himself (Suwon Yeongtong, Gyeonggi)	Member of the National Assembly from Suwon D (Gyeonggi); 30 May 2012–15 May 2014	Succeeded by Park Kwang-on
Preceded by Jung Mi-gyeong (Suwon B, Gyeonggi); Park Kwang-on (Suwon D, Gyeonggi)	Member of the National Assembly from Suwon E (Gyeonggi); 30 May 2016–29 May 2024	Succeeded by Yeom Tae-young
Party political offices
Preceded by Park Jie-won	Floor Leader of the Democratic Party·Democratic United Party; 30 May 2011–4 May 2012	Succeeded by Park Jie-won
