= Choi Kyo-jin =

South Korean civil servant (born 1965)

Choi Gyo-jin
- 최교진
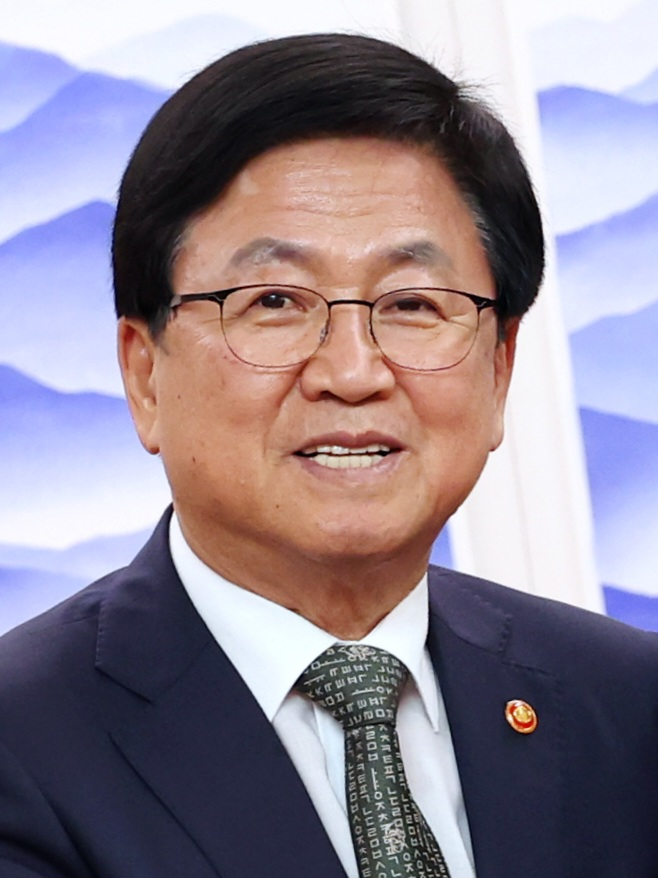

Minister of Education
- In office 11 September 2025 – 22 November 2026
- President: Lee Jae Myung
- Prime Minister: Kim Min-seok; Han Seong-sook
- Preceded by: Choi Eun-ok (acting)
- Succeeded by: Choi Eun-ok (acting)

Deputy Prime Minister of South Korea
- In office 11 September 2025 – 30 September 2025
- Prime Minister: Kim Min-seok
- Preceded by: Lee Ju-ho
- Succeeded by: Bae Kyung-hoon
Local government offices
Superintendent of Education of Sejong Special Self-Governing City
In office 1 July 2014 – 1 September 2025
Mayor	Lee Choon-hee; Choi Min-ho
Preceded by	Shin Jung-kyun
Succeeded by	Cheon Beom-san (acting)

Personal details
- Born: 24 November 1953 (age 72) Boryeong, South Chungcheong Province, South Korea
- Education: Kongju National University (BKLA); Mokwon University (MPA)

Korean name
- Hangul: 최교진
- RR: Choe Gyojin
- MR: Ch'oe Kyojin

Choi Kyo-jin (Korean: 최교진; born 24 November 1953) is a South Korean politician and educator who has served as the minister of education since 2025. He previously held office as the superintendent of education of Sejong Special Self-Governing City from 2014 to 2025.

== Early life and education ==
Choi was born in Boryeong, South Chungcheong Province. He graduated Bachelor of Korean Language Education from Kongju National University and Master of Public Administration from Mokwon University subsequently embarked on a teaching career.

== Career ==
In the 1990s, Choi was the head and senior vice-chairman of the Korean Teachers and Education Workers Union's Chungcheongnam-do branch. He was elected Sejong City Superintendent of Education in 2014 and was reelected twice.

Choi became minister of education in the government of president Lee Jae Myung. He resigned in 2026 amid criticism over the conduct of that year's College Scholastic Ability Test, in which 111 candidates had been found with unauthorised smart devices and nationwide alerts were issued on cellphones nationwide as part of efforts to stop cheating.
