= List of KAIST presidents =

List of presidents of KAIST

The following is a list of all principals and presidents of KAIST from its founding as Korea Advanced Institute of Science (KAIS) in 1971.

== Korea Advanced Institute of Science ==
No.	Image	Name	Hangul; Hanja	Term
1		Lee Sang-soo	이상수; 李相洙	1971 January 27–1972 March 10
2		Park Joseph D.	박달조; 朴達祚	1972 March 11–1974 May 19
3 & 4		Cho Soon-tak	조순탁; 趙淳卓	1974 May 20–1980 May 25
5		Choi Hyung-seop	최형섭; 崔亨燮	1980 May 26–1980 August 25
6		Lee Chung-oh	이정오; 李正五	1980 August 26–1981 January 4

== Korea Institute of Technology (KIT) ==
No.	Image	Name	Hangul; Hanja	Term
1		Choi Soon-dal	최순달; 崔順達	1985 August 1–1987 February 1
2		Lee Chung-oh	이정오; 李正五	1987 February 2–1988 May 2
3		Chon Hak-ze	전학제; 全學濟	1988 May 11–1989 August
4		Cho Byung-ha	조병하; 趙炳夏	1989 August–1990 April 24

== Information and Communications University (ICU) ==
No.	Name	Hangul; Hanja	Term
1	Yang Seun-taek	양승택; 梁承澤	1997 July 16–2001 March 25
2	Ahn Byung-yup	안병엽; 安炳燁	2001 April 23–2004 February 25
3	Huh Un-ha	허운나; 許雲那	2004 July 7–2008 January 27

== KAIST ==
No.	Image	Name	Hangul; Hanja	Term
1		Lee Choo-chon	이주천; 李柱天	5 Jan 1981 – 8 Jan 1982
2		Lim Kwan	임관; 林寬	9 Jan 1982 – 22 Feb 1984
3		Chon Hak-ze	전학제; 全學濟	23 Feb 1984 – 18 Jan 1986
4		Lee Chung-oh	이정오; 李正五	19 Feb 1986 – 2 May 1988
5		Chon Hak-ze	전학제; 全學濟	11 May 1988 – 22 Feb 1989
6		Lee Sang-soo	이상수; 李相洙	23 Feb 1989 – 28 Feb 1991
7		Chun Soung-soon	천성순; 千性淳	1 Mar 1991 – 29 Mar 1994
8		Shim Sang-chul	심상철; 沈相哲	30 Mar 1994 – 29 May 1995
9		Yoon Duk-yong	윤덕용; 尹德龍	31 May 1995 – 8 Jun 1998
10		Choi Duk-in	최덕인; 崔德隣	9 Jun 1998 – 8 Jun 2001
11		Hong Chan-sun	홍창선; 洪昌善	9 Jun 2001 – 6 Jul 2004
12		Robert B. Laughlin	로버트 러플린	7 Jul 2004 – 13 Jul 2006
13 & 14		Suh Nam-pyo	서남표; 徐南杓	14 Jul 2006 – 22 Feb 2013
15		Kang Sung-mo	강성모; 姜城模	23 Feb 2013 – 22 Feb 2017
16		Shin Sung-chul	신성철; 申成澈	23 Feb 2017 – 21 Feb 2021
17		Lee Kwang Hyung	이광형; 李光炯	22 Feb 2021 – 30 Jun 2026
18		Choongsik Bae	배충식	1 Jul 2026 - date

== See also ==
- List of Seoul National University presidents
- List of Korea University presidents
- List of Yonsei University presidents
