= Yang Sung-chul =

South Korean politician

South Korean Ambassador to the United States
- In office 5 September 2000 – 16 April 2003
- President: Kim Dae-jung
- Preceded by: Lee Hong-koo
- Succeeded by: Han Sung-joo

Personal details
- Born: 20 November 1939 (age 86) Gokseong County, Zenranan Province, Korea, Empire of Japan
- Citizenship: South Korea
- Party: National Congress for New Politics
- Children: 2
- Education: Seoul National University (BA); University of Hawaiʻi at Mānoa (MA); University of Kentucky (PhD)
- Occupation: Political scientist
- Known for: Member of the National Assembly; Ambassador to the United States

Korean name
- Hangul: 양성철
- Hanja: 梁性喆
- RR: Yang Seongcheol
- MR: Yang Sŏngch'ŏl

Yang Sung-chul (born 20 November 1939) is a South Korean political scientist, politician, and diplomat.

== Early life and career ==
Yang was born in Gokseong County, South Jeolla Province in 1939. He did his undergraduate studies at Seoul National University's Department of Political Science. While in college, he volunteered to serve in the Korean Army from 1960 to 1962 as a student draftee. He began working at the Hankook Ilbo as a reporter in October 1963, but received a scholarship in 1965 to study at the University of Hawaii at Manoa's East–West Center for his master's degree. It was there that he first met Kim Dae-jung, of whom he would go on to become a political supporter; Kim was visiting Hawaii at the time at the invitation of the U.S. Department of State. He went on to the University of Kentucky for his doctoral studies, where he defended a dissertation comparing the South Korean April Revolution of 1960 which led to the resignation of Syngman Rhee and the May 16 coup the following year which brought Park Chung Hee to power.

Upon receiving his Ph.D., he taught at the Eastern Kentucky University in Richmond for four years and returned to the University of Kentucky system in 1975 to 1987 where he was a full professor and a member of the University of Kentucky graduate faculty. He also taught at Northwestern University in Evanston, Illinois, Indiana University in Bloomington, and Pembroke State University in Pembroke, North Carolina. While in the United States, he was one of the founding members of the Association of the Korean Political Scientists in North America and served as its Secretary-General. Yang married after moving to the United States, and had two children there. He naturalised as a U.S. citizen in 1977.

Yang returned to South Korea in 1986 as a visiting professor at Seoul National University. Later that same year, he accepted a professorship at the Graduate Institute of Peace Studies at Kyung Hee University, where he was an academic dean until 1996. He gave up U.S. citizenship in 1989.

== In the National Assembly ==
Yang was elected to the 15th National Assembly in the 1996 elections. He served on the National Assembly's Foreign Affairs and Unification Committee. In 1998, he became acting head of the Jeollanam-do branch of the National Congress for New Politics, replacing Han Hwa-gap (한화갑).

== Ambassadorship ==
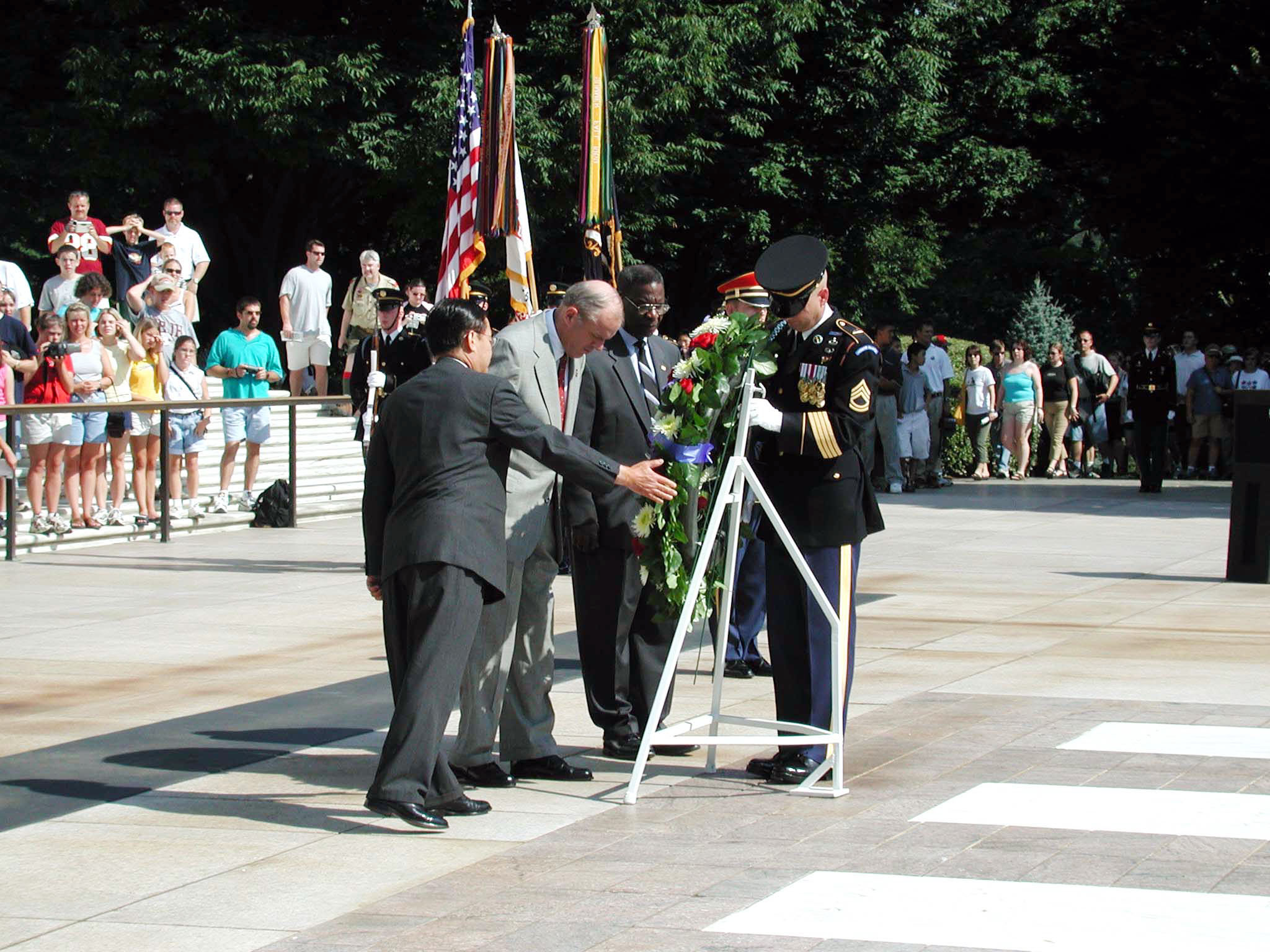
Yang (left), Secretary of the Army Thomas E. White, and retired Army Lieutenant General Julius Becton at a 2001 wreath-laying ceremony for African-American veterans of the Korean War

In May 2000, just in advance of the first Inter-Korean summit, South Korean newspapers began to report that Yang had been chosen as Seoul's next ambassador to the United States. Yang's appointment was a surprise due to his relative lack of political and diplomatic experience. Stratfor analysed Kim's choice to nominate Yang, along with the naming of four-decade career diplomat and trade expert Hong Soong-young as ambassador to Beijing, as part of an effort to push forward the Sunshine Policy: the posting to Washington of Yang, an expert on North Korean affairs, symbolised the autonomy of Seoul's policies towards Pyongyang, while Hong's role was to improve relations with Beijing and ensure its support for inter-Korean reconciliation. Yang's term as ambassador came to an end in April 2003, when he was succeeded by Han Sung-joo.

== Later career ==
After leaving his ambassadorial post, Yang and his wife returned to South Korea. He went on to become a professor at Korea University's Graduate School of International Studies. He also served as the chairperson of the Kim Dae-jung Peace Foundation Advisory Committee from August 2007 to 2012.

Drs. Sung-Chul Yang and Daisy Lee Yang Lecture Series endowment fund agreement with UH Foundation, dated July 28, 2015("Original Agreement) and amended gift agreement on June 8, 2021, was to support the promotion and advancement of Korean Studies at the Center for Korean Studies at the University of Hawaii at Manoa Campus. This lecture series was created to invite an eminent scholar of Korean or Asian affairs to deliver a lecture.

== Selected works ==
English

- Revolution and change: a comparative study of the April Student Revolution of 1960 and the May Military coup d'etat of 1961 in Korea. Doctoral dissertation. University of Kentucky. 1970. OCLC 9114852.
- Revolution and change: a comparative study of the April Student Revolution of 1960 and the May Military coup d'etat of 1961 in Korea. Seoul: Korea University Press. 2015. ISBN 978-89-7641-892-0.
- Korea and Two Regimes: Kim Il Sung and Park Chung Hee. Cambridge, Massachusetts: Schenkman Publishing Co. 1981. ISBN 978-0-87073-605-6. OCLC 6708895.
- The North and South Korean political systems: A comparative analysis. Boulder, Colorado: Westview Press. 1994. ISBN 978-89-7225-021-0. OCLC 29845380.
- Polemics & Foibles: Fragments on Korean Politics, Society and Beyond. Seoul: Seoul Press. 1998. ISBN 978-89-7225-089-0. OCLC 43308171.
- As editor. Democracy and Communism: Theory, Reality and the Future. The KAIS International Conference Series No. 3. Seoul: The Korean Association of International Studies. 1995. OCLC 45268467.
- With James Lilley et al. Ambasadors' Memoir: U.S.-Korea Relations Through the Eyes of the Ambassadors. Washington, D.C.: Korea Economic Institute. 2008. ISBN 978-0-9747141-5-8.

Korean

- With Pak Han-sik et al. 북한 기행: 재미 한국인 학자 9인이 본 80년대 북한 [A Journey to North Korea: 1980s North Korea as seen by nine Korean scholars from the U.S.]. Seoul: 한울출판사. 1986. OCLC 19388626.
- 남북통일 이론의 새로운 전개 [A New Approach to Unified Korea]. 통일연구 시리즈 no. 5. Seoul: 경남대학교 극동문제연구소. 1989. OCLC 22827347.
- With Park Sung-Jo. 독일통일과 분단한국 [United Germany and Divided Korea]. 통일연구 시리즈 No. 6. Seoul: 경남대학교 극동문제연구소. 1991. OCLC 27851661.
- 한국정부론:역대정권 고위직 행정엘리트 연구(1948-1993) [On The Government of the Republic of Korea: A Study of Top Administrative Elites from 1948 to 1993]. Seoul: Pakyong-sa. 1994. ISBN 89-10-40082-X.
- 북한정치 연구 [A Study of North Korean Politics] (2nd ed.). Seoul: Pakyong-sa. 1995. ISBN 89-10-40091-9.
- Co-edited with Kang Sung-hak. 북한외교정책 [North Korea's Foreign Policy]. Seoul: Seoul Press. 1995. ISBN 89-7225-059-7.
- With Lee Yong-pil. 북한체제변화와 협상전략 [Negotiation Strategy to Transform the North Korean Political System]. Seoul: Pakyong-sa. 1996. ISBN 89-10-40093-5.
- 삶의 정치:이제 정치도 새롭게 태어나자 [Politics for Every Day Life]. 서울 프레스. 1997. ISBN 89-7225-082-1.
- 물구나무서기 정치 [On Topsyturvy Politics]. 서울 프레스. 1998. ISBN 89-7225-091-0.
- 통일:우리도 분단을 극복할 수 있다, Volume I and II [Unification:We Can Overcome Division]. 서울 프레스. 1999. ISBN 89-7225-113-5.
- 움:민구의 작은 발견. Seoul: 현대시문학. 2007. ISBN 978-89-90520-57-9.
- With 이정복. 21세기 한국 정치의 발전방향. Seoul: 서울대학교 출판부. 2009. ISBN 978-89-521-0970-5.
- 한국 외교와 외교관:양성철 전주미대사. Seoul: Korea National Diplomatic Academy. 2015. ISBN 979-11-952526-4-0.
- With 이상근 김대중 외교: 비전과 유산 [Kim Dae-jung Diplomacy:Vision and Legacy]. Seoul: 연세대학교 대학출판문화원. 2015. ISBN 978-89-6850-124-1.
- 학문과 정치:막스 베버와 21세기 전자인간시대 [Science and Politics:Max Weber and Homo Electronicus in the 2lst Century]. Seoul: 고려대학교 출판문화원. 2017. ISBN 978-89-7641-944-6.
- 글이 금이다 [Classic is Gold]. Seoul: 박영사. 2019. ISBN 978-89-10-98010-0.

== Honors and awards ==
- Distinguished Alumni Award on the occasion of Gokseong Elementary School's Centennial, 2012, Gokseong County
- Distinguished Alumni Award of Kwangju High School, 1998, Kwangju High School Alumni Association
- Outstanding Alumnus of Kwangju High School, 2004, Kwangju High School Alumni Association in Seoul-Gyeonggi Region
- Kwangju High School Distinguished Alumni Achievement Award, 2021
- Hall of Distinguished Alumni, University of Kentucky 2010, Lexington, Kentucky
- Fifty Years, Fifty Stories, East-West Center, 2010, in commemoration of the East-West Center's 50th Anniversary
- Person of the Year 2000 for Gokseong County, South Cholla Province, Korea
- 건국 포장(ROK Presidential Award) On the Occasion of the 3rd Anniversary of the April Student Revolution, 1963
