= Lee Seok-hyun =

Lee Seok-hyun may refer to:

- Lee Seok-hyun (footballer)
- Lee Seok-hyun (politician)
