= Jo Wan-kyu =

South Korean politician (1928–2026)

- 조완규
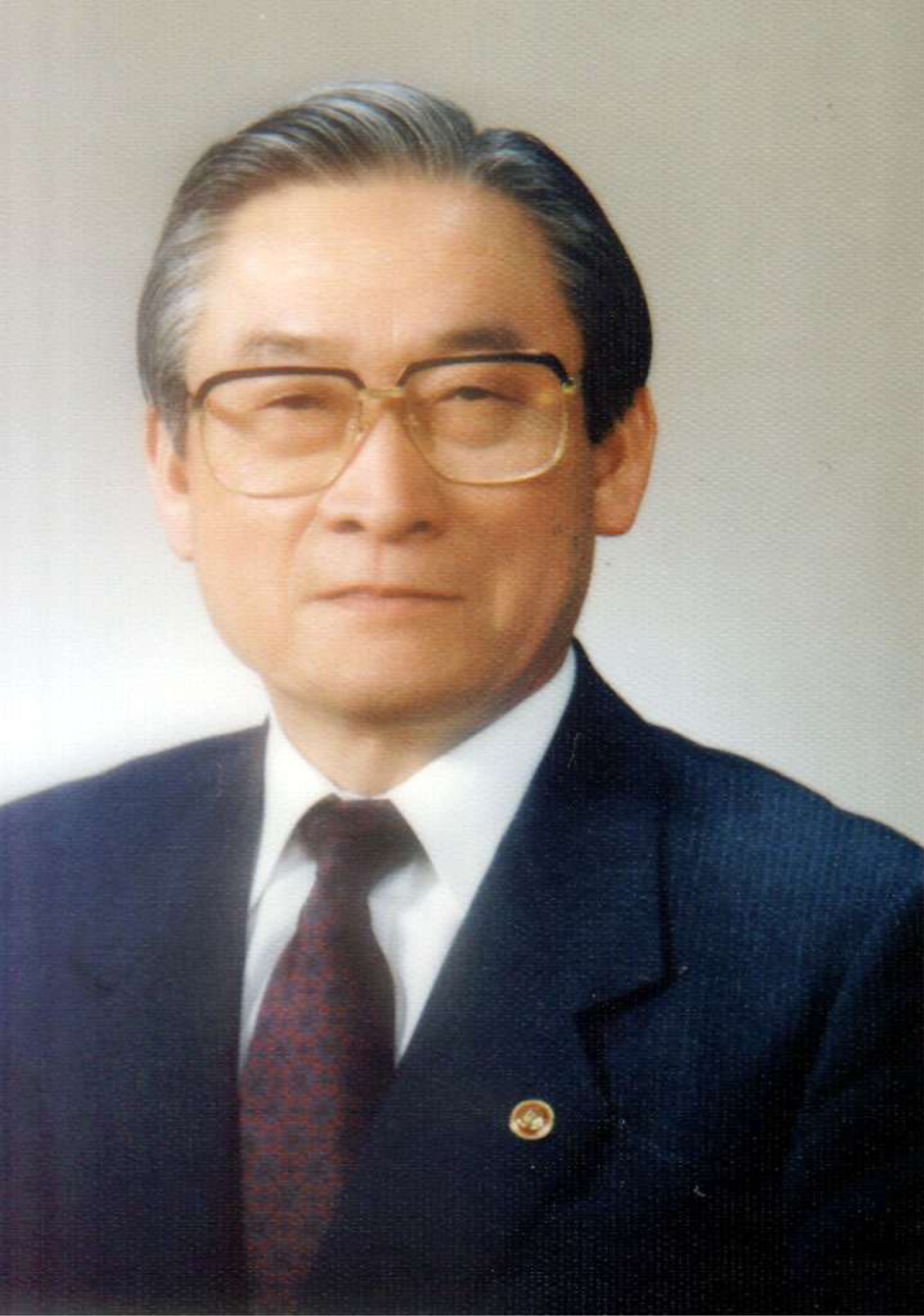

Minister of Education
- In office 23 January 1992 – 25 February 1993
- Preceded by: Yoon Hyeong-seob
- Succeeded by: Oh Byung-mun

Personal details
- Born: 11 February 1928 Daejeon, Korea, Empire of Japan
- Died: 13 July 2026 (aged 98)
- Education: Seoul National University (BS, MS, PhD)
- Occupation: Biologist; Academic

Jo Wan-Kyu (Korean: 조완규; 11 February 1928 – 13 July 2026) was a South Korean politician. He served as Minister of Education from 1992 to 1993. He also founded and served as the first president of the Korean Academy of Science and Technology from 1994 to 1998.

Jo died on 13 July 2026, at the age of 98.
