= Korean Academy of Science and Technology =

Think tank in Seongnam, South Korea

Agency overview
- Formed: June 7, 1995
- Headquarters: Seongnam, Gyeonggi-do, South Korea
- Agency executive: President, Yoo Ook Joon
- Website: www.kast.or.kr

Korean name
- Hangul: 한국과학기술한림원
- Hanja: 韓國科學技術翰林院
- RR: Hanguk gwahak gisul hallimwon
- MR: Han'guk kwahak kisul hallimwŏn

The Korean Academy of Science and Technology (KAST) is the highest academy of science in South Korea and serves as an integrated think-tank for the country's science and technology. It contributes to national development by promoting science and technology through active participation of its member scientists and engineers who have demonstrated professional excellence domestically and internationally in their respective fields.

KAST contributes to the globalization of science and technology by playing the role of the principal contact point for international cooperation and information exchanges, through bilateral and/or multilateral academic exchange programs with foreign academies, public semi-scientific lectures and "Science Hall of Fame" program, cooperation with international scientific and technological organizations, and friendly relations and exchanges with overseas scholars.

KAST was founded in 1994 to play a strong role in helping South Korea climb the technology ladder. KAST has also served to encourage cooperation between scientists in South and North Korea in the science and technology sector. The non-profit institute has also strengthened global cooperation by operating the secretariat for the 17-member Association of Academies of Science in Asia (AASA) since 2000.

== International standing ==
KAST is an internationally recognized academy of science. KAST has 34 Nobel Laureates amongst its foreign members including Steven Chu, who is a co-winner of Nobel Prize in Physics in 1997 and head of the U.S. Department of Energy during the Barack Obama administration, Robert B. Laughlin, head of the Korea Advanced Institute of Science and Technology and Jerome I. Friedman, who earned the 1990 Nobel Prize in Physics.

== Awards ==
KAST and DuPont Korea cooperate in awarding the DuPont Science Award to scientists who have made significant studies and observations in various fields. The award recognizes the scientists' contribution to studies and advancement in the country and serves to encourage further excellence. Since 1997, KAST also presents the annual Young Scientist Award to four individuals in research fields. Many of the winners are employed at SKY, KAIST, or POSTECH at the time of the award and later frequently work for KAIST or the Institute for Basic Science.

== List of presidents ==
- Jo Wan-kyu (조완규) (November 1994 – March 1998)
- Jhon Mu Shik (전무식) (March 1998 – January 2001)
- Han In Kyu (한인규) (January 2001 – February 2004)
- Chung KunMo (정근모) (February 2004 – February 2007) a former department head at the International Atomic Energy Agency
- Rhee Hyun-Ku (이현구) (February 2007 – March 2010)
- Chung Kil-Saeng (정길생) (March 2010 – March 2013)
- Park Sung Hyun (박성현) (March 2013 – March 2016)
- Lee Myung-Chul (이명철) (March 2016 – March 2019)
- Han Min-Koo (한민구) (March 2019 – March 2022)
- Yoo Ook Joon (유욱준) (March 2022 – current)
