= Lee Ki-jun =

South Korean politician (1938–2025)

- 이기준

Minister of Education and Human Resources Development
- In office 5 January 2005 – 10 January 2005
- Preceded by: Ahn Byung-young
- Succeeded by: Kim Young-sik

President of Seoul National University
- In office 11 November 1998 – 9 May 2002
- Preceded by: Seonu Jungho
- Succeeded by: Chung Un-chan

Personal details
- Born: 28 July 1938 Keijō, Korea, Japan
- Died: 9 November 2025 (aged 87) Seoul, South Korea
- Education: Seoul National University (BS, MS); University of Washington (PhD)
- Occupation: Academic

Lee Ki-jun (Korean: 이기준; 28 July 1938 – 9 November 2025) was a South Korean politician. He was president of Seoul National University from 1998 to 2002 and served as Minister of Education and Human Resources Development for five days, from 5 to 10 January 2005.

Lee died on 9 November 2025 at Seoul National University Hospital, at the age of 87.
