= Kim Seon-ho (general) =

South Korean general and politician (born 1964)

Minister of National Defense
- Acting
- In office 5 December 2024 – 26 June 2025
- President: Yoon Suk Yeol; Han Duck-soo (acting); Choi Sang-mok (acting); Lee Ju-ho (acting); Lee Jae-myung
- Prime Minister: Han Duck-soo; Choi Sang-mok (acting)
- Preceded by: Kim Yong-hyun
- Succeeded by: Lee Doo-hee (acting)

Deputy Minister of National Defense
- In office 20 October 2023 – 26 June 2025
- President: Yoon Suk Yeol; Han Duck-soo (acting); Choi Sang-mok (acting); Lee Ju-ho (acting); Lee Jae-myung
- Prime Minister: Han Duck-soo; Choi Sang-mok (acting); Lee Ju-ho (acting)
- Preceded by: Shin Beom-chul
- Succeeded by: Lee Doo-hee

Personal details
- Born: 1964 (age 61–62) Seoul, South Korea
- Party: Independent
- Education: Korea Military Academy

Military service
- Allegiance: South Korea
- Branch/service: Republic of Korea Army
- Years of service: 1987–2020
- Rank: Lieutenant general
- Commands: Capital Defense Command

Korean name
- Hangul: 김선호
- Hanja: 金善鎬
- RR: Gim Seonho
- MR: Kim Sŏnho

Kim Seon-ho (Korean: 김선호; born 1964) is a South Korean politician and retired Republic of Korea Army lieutenant general. An independent, he served as acting minister of national defense of South Korea from December 2024 to June 2025.

On 5 December 2024, during an investigation by the National Assembly, he accused national defense minister Kim Yong-hyun of having ordered soldiers to enter the National Assembly and prevent lawmakers from gathering to vote down the martial law declaration.

== Early life ==
Kim was born in Seoul. He graduated from the Korea Military Academy.

== Life and career ==
Prior to becoming the acting minister of national defense of South Korea, Kim served as Deputy Minister of National Defense of South Korea under Yoon Suk Yeol's Government. As deputy minister, he condemned North Korea's deployment of troops in support of Russia in its war with Ukraine, and raised concerns that the North will most probably use the intelligence and funds it receives in return to advance its nuclear weapons.

Amidst the 2024 South Korean martial law crisis, Kim became acting minister of national defense of South Korea after Kim Yong-hyun resigned on 5 December 2024. Furthermore, according to him, Yong-hyun had ordered troops to enter the National Assembly and block lawmakers from entering the compound during martial law.

Kim has stated that the defense ministry and the military will not obey any orders to execute martial law should they be issued again, amid rumors over the possibility of another martial law declaration. He served as acting minister for a month of Lee Jae Myung's term, before being replaced as vice-minister by Lee Doo-hee on 26 June 2025.
