= Jang Deok-sun =

Korean literary scholar (1921–1996)

- Born: July 9, 1921; Longjing, Jilin, Manchukuo
- Died: August 20, 1996 (aged 75); Seodaemun District, Seoul, South Korea
- Resting place: Jangheung, Gyeonggi Province
- Education: Longjing Middle School, Yeonhee Professional School (BA, 1944), Seoul National University (BA, 1949; Ph.D, 1971)
- Occupations: Professor, Scholar of Korean Studies and Literature, Essayist
- Notable work: Study on Korean Folk Literature (1970) (한국설화문학연구), History of Korean Literature (1976) (한국문학사) , History of Korean Essay Literature (1977)(한국수필문학사)

Korean name
- Hangul: 장덕순
- Hanja: 張德順
- RR: Jang Deoksun
- MR: Chang Tŏksun

Jang Deok-sun (Korean: 장덕순; July 9, 1921 – August 20, 1996) was a Korean literary scholar and essayist of Seoul National University. Jang has his familial roots in Uljin and his literary alias is Seongsan. Jang graduated from the Humanities Department of Yeonhee Professional School and the Korean Literature Department of Seoul National University. He then contributed to the studies of Korean literature, mythical and oral literature, and traditional Korean literature prior to the introduction of Western literary models in Korea. through the studies done in his first book, General Theory of Korean Literature (국문학통론). His work, History of Korean Literature (한국설화문학연구), includes the argument that although traditional literature written in Chinese characters can be included within the spectrum of the Korean literary tradition, there is a need to differentiate the literature before and after the creation of the Korean alphabet Hangul by King Sejong the Great in 1446.

== Life ==
=== Early life and education ===
Jang was born as the second son of his family in July 1921 in Longjing, Manchuria, under Japanese Colonial Rule. He graduated from Chung-ang Elementary School (중앙소학교) in 1935. Jang went on to Gwangmyeong Middle School (광명중학교) in 1939, and studied under the Humanities Department at Yeonhee Professional School starting from 1941 (which was the predecessor of modern-day Yonsei University) and graduated in March 1944.

Jang then graduated from the Korean Language and Literature Department of Seoul National University in July, 1949 with a Ph.D in Literature through writing his book, Study on Korean Folk Literature (1970).

=== Career ===
==== As an educator ====
In 1949, Jang was hired as a full-time lecturer at Kongju National University where he taught courses in the College of Education. Jang continued to work at Kongjoo, then moved on to Daegu and Pusan National University consecutively until he became a professor at Yeonhee University in 1953. However, due to Jang's involvement in the April 19th Revolution in 1960, a protest against the elongated autocratic term of President Rhee Sungman, he resigned from Yeonhee University.

In 1963, after his resignation, Jang was hired at Seoul National University (SNU) where he served as a professor in the department of Korean Language and Literature. During his time at SNU, Jang taught courses and conducted research in Korean traditional literature, including the studies on mythical oral literature from before the Koryo (or Goryeo) period (918 to 1392 C.E.). This study covered the eras from the Koryo dynasty to the early 20th century. He retired in 1987.

==== As a scholar of Korean literature ====
Jang published his first book, General Theory of Korean Literature (국문학통론) in 1960. In General Theory of Korean Literature, Jang helped to introduce Korean literature and its historical relevance. He also analyzed the origin of the genres within Korean Literature and introduced major works surrounding Korean history based on time periods. The significance of this early work is in the combination of the elements of the introductory and the historical scholarly work, providing a basis for future Korean literature and history scholars to reference from.

Within Jang's book, he also presents two distinctive methods of Korean literary research: the folkloristic method and the comparative literary method. In doing so, Jang helped to emphasize the relationship between oral and written Korean literature, even if "later opinions of research methods focused on theories of aesthetic study of the literary works themselves." Using his book, Jang argued that thorough comparative research on literature both inside and outside of Korea need to be conducted and, also, that the characteristics of Korean literature and its status in world literature needs to be identified.

In 1970 and 1971, Jang published the Study on Korean Folk Literature (한국설화문학연구), from his doctoral dissertation, and the Introduction to Oral Literature (구비문학개론), with his students. These texts helped not only to clarify the intersection of traditional literature with classic and modern novels but also helped each type of folklore gain categorization and started the development of an organized structure to the study of folk literature. More specifically, the Study on Korean Folk Literature allowed scholars to view the importance of folklore and tales through an Anthropological lens, while listing ten scholarly articles on the different forms of Korean folklore and eighteen works on the intersection of mythology, works of fiction, and poetry.

Included in this study is the content of the Yaraeja Jeonseol (야래자 전설), which is a type of a heroic myth when a mysterious beast (such as a snake, otter, or a softshell turtle) transforms into a man and visits a virgin woman's room in the night to conceive a child, and the child born thus grows up to be a great man.

Afterwards, in 1971, he published Introduction to Oral Literature (구비문학개론) with his students, which contributed to systematizing and elevating the position of Oral Literature in Korean Literature Studies. Through Study on Korean Folk Literature and Introduction to Oral Literature, Jang put the types of traditional folktales and mythology into nine categories, including A. Mythological content (신화적 내용), B. Fables (동물담), C. Biographies (일생담), and six others. Specifically, Study on Korean Folk Literature gave an opening to the way of scholarly thinking that there is literary value in folk tales, which were considered in the domain of Anthropology or folklore. These works hold their significance as researches that structuralized the study on Korean Oral literature after the Liberation from Japanese Rule in August 15, 1945, when public study and publication of Korean Literature written in the Korean language was prohibited by law.

As a scholar of Korean literature, Jang has contributed through publications on comparative studies. Most notably, he has compared the legends of the aforementioned Korean Yaraeja Jeonseol (야래자 전설) and the Japanese Miwayama Densetsu (Korean: 삼륜산전설, Japanese: 三輪山伝説). Through the study of these legends, and the archetypal narratives of heroic literature in East Asia, Jang has furthered the discussion of both Korean and Japanese literature. He has also wrote the History of Korean Essay Literature (한국수필문학사) and Origin and Sites of Korean Literature (국문학의 연원과 현장), which were based on his research of traditional Korean essays, which were written in Chinese characters and had a distinct literary style, prior to the influence of Western nations. These works were conceived based on his research on traditional Korean essays before Western influence, written in Chinese characters and literary style while he traveled South Korea.

Jang published academic works in Korean ethnology, such as Korean Women's Literature (한국의 여속) (1969) and Korean Customs (한국풍속지) (1972).

In 1973, he participated in the World Congress of Orientalists, and also was invited to the 29th Joseon Studies Conference held in Japan. Jang served as the chairman of the Donam Society, a judge for the Hankook Ilbo Publishing Culture Award and for the Central Culture Award, and was a member of the Academy of Sciences.

=== Later life ===
In his later years, Jang published his major works into an anthology titled Collected Works of Seongsan Jang Deok-sun (1995). After his retirement, Jang formed Samwoohoe (Korean: 삼우회 Hanja: Hanja: 三友會), an informal scholarly group with fellow writers Lee Gyeong-seon (이경선) and Lee Kang-ro (이강로). The Samwoohoe conducted field studies on pavilion literature (누정 문학), a poetic tradition composed by scholars in scenic settings.

During his retirement, Jang also served as the chairman of the Donam Literary Association (도남학회) the president of the Oral Literature Association (구비문학회), and the chairman of The Society of Korean Literature (국문학연구회).

Jang died on August 20, 1996, due to a chronic illness in his residence in Seodaemun-gu, Seoul. He was 75 years old at the time. Jang is now buried in Jangheung, Gyeonggi-do.

== Awards and acknowledgements ==
Jang established The Seongsan Scholarly Award (성산학술상) in 1995. The award is designated for people who contribute to the study of Korean classical literature and the first recipient of the award was Professor Jo Gyu-ik of Soongsil University on September 5, 1996, after Jang's death.

== Criticism ==
Later scholars criticized Jang's first work, General Theory of Korean Literature, for its viewpoint to differentiate between literature written in Chinese characters during the Chosun Dynasty and the works written in the Korean writing system. Also in the same book, Jang's method of categorizing Korean literature into three "forms" (양식), which could be named as lyrical (서정적), epic (서사적), and dramatic (극적), instead of using the Western-influenced term "genre" (장르), received objection as well. His wording of the "forms" wasn't the main subject of discussion, but within the form of epic literature, Jang included both non-fictional essays and works of fiction such as novels that focus on narrating fictional events. This caused issues in the actual practice of following his categorization method.

== Published works ==
- 『국문학통론』 (English: General Theory of Korean Literature) (1960)
- 『한국의 여속』 (English: Korean Women's Literature) (1969)
- 『한국설화문학연구』 (English: Korean Folktale Literature Studies) (1970)
- 『구비문학개설』 (Oral Literature Introduction) (1971)
- 『한국풍속지』 (Korean Customs) (1972)
- 『한국문학사』 (History of Korean Literature) (1976)
- 『한국수필문학사』(History of Korean Essay Literature) (1977)
- 『한국문학의 연원과 현장』)(Origin and Sites of Korean Literature) (1986)
- 『성산장덕순선생저작집』 전 10권 (Collected Works of Seongsan Jang Deok-sun, 10 Volumes) (1995)
