= Julius W. Becton Jr. =

United States Army lieutenant general (1926–2023)

Julius Becton
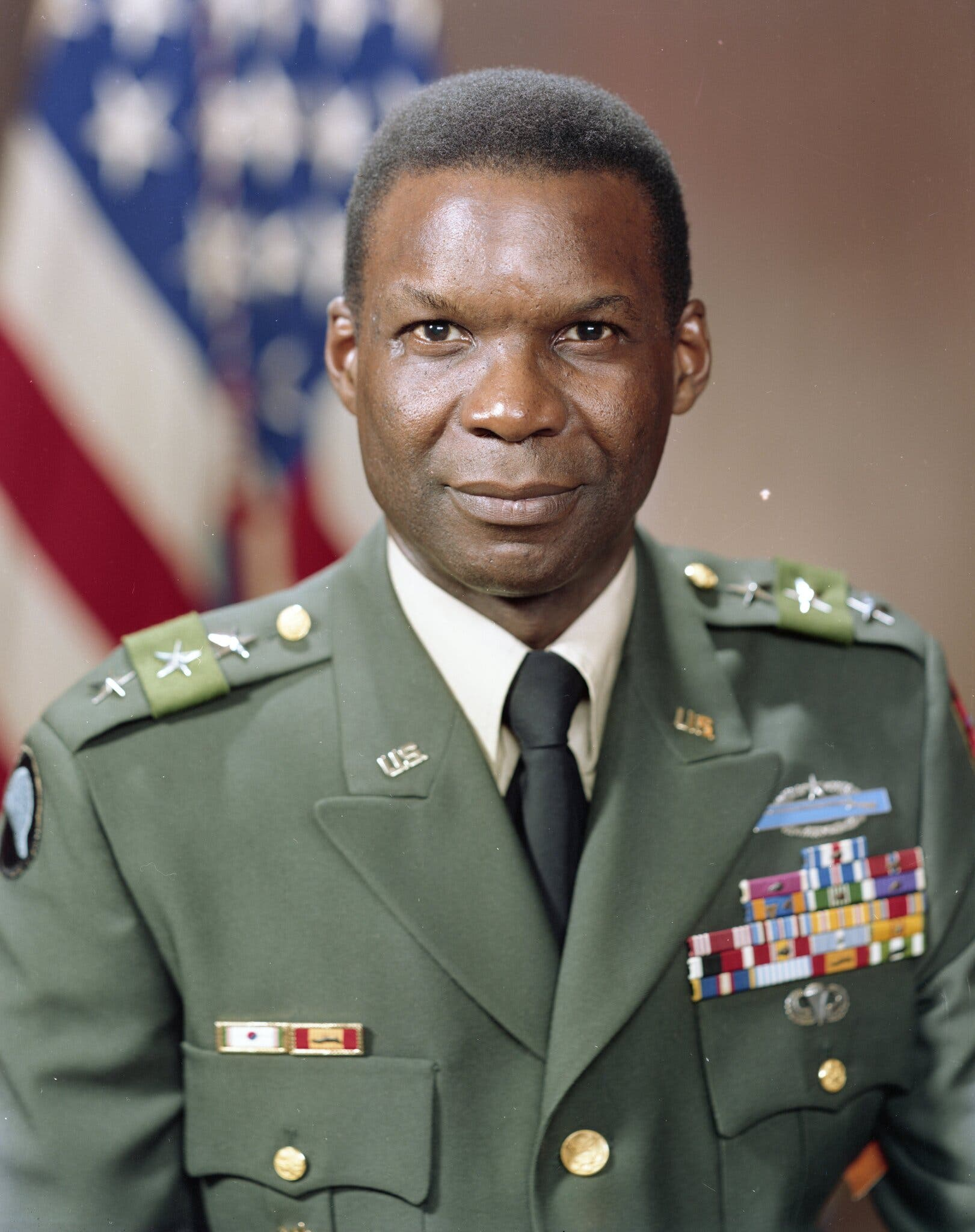

Director of the Federal Emergency Management Agency
- In office November 1985 – June 1989
- President: Ronald Reagan; George H. W. Bush
- Preceded by: Robert Morris (acting)
- Succeeded by: Robert Morris (acting)

Personal details
- Born: Julius Wesley Becton Jr. June 29, 1926 Bryn Mawr, Pennsylvania, U.S.
- Died: November 28, 2023 (aged 97) Fort Belvoir, Virginia, U.S.
- Resting place: Arlington National Cemetery
- Party: Republican
- Spouse: Louise Thornton (m. 1948; died 2019)
- Children: 5
- Education: Muhlenberg College (attended); Prairie View A&M University (BS); University of Maryland, College Park (MA)

Military service
- Allegiance: United States
- Branch/service: United States Army
- Years of service: 1944–1946; 1948–1983
- Rank: Lieutenant General
- Commands: VII Corps; 1st Cavalry Division
- Battles/wars: World War II; Cold War; • Korean War; • Vietnam War
- Awards: Army Distinguished Service Medal; Silver Star (2); Legion of Merit (2); Distinguished Flying Cross; Bronze Star Medal (2); Air Medal (2, with valor); Army Commendation Medal (2); Purple Heart (2); Combat Infantryman Badge; Parachutist Badge

Julius Wesley Becton Jr. (June 29, 1926 – November 28, 2023) was a United States Army lieutenant general, director of the Federal Emergency Management Agency (FEMA), and education administrator. He served as Commanding General, VII Corps in 1978 and as Deputy Commanding General for Training of the United States Army Training and Doctrine Command (TRADOC) in 1981. He retired in 1983.

== Early life and education ==
Becton was born in Bryn Mawr, Pennsylvania, on June 29, 1926. He joined the U.S. Army Air Corps in July 1944, graduated infantry Officer Candidate School in 1945, and served with 93rd Infantry Division. He separated from the Army in 1946 but returned to service after President Harry S. Truman's executive order to integrate the U.S. Armed Forces in 1948.

== Career ==
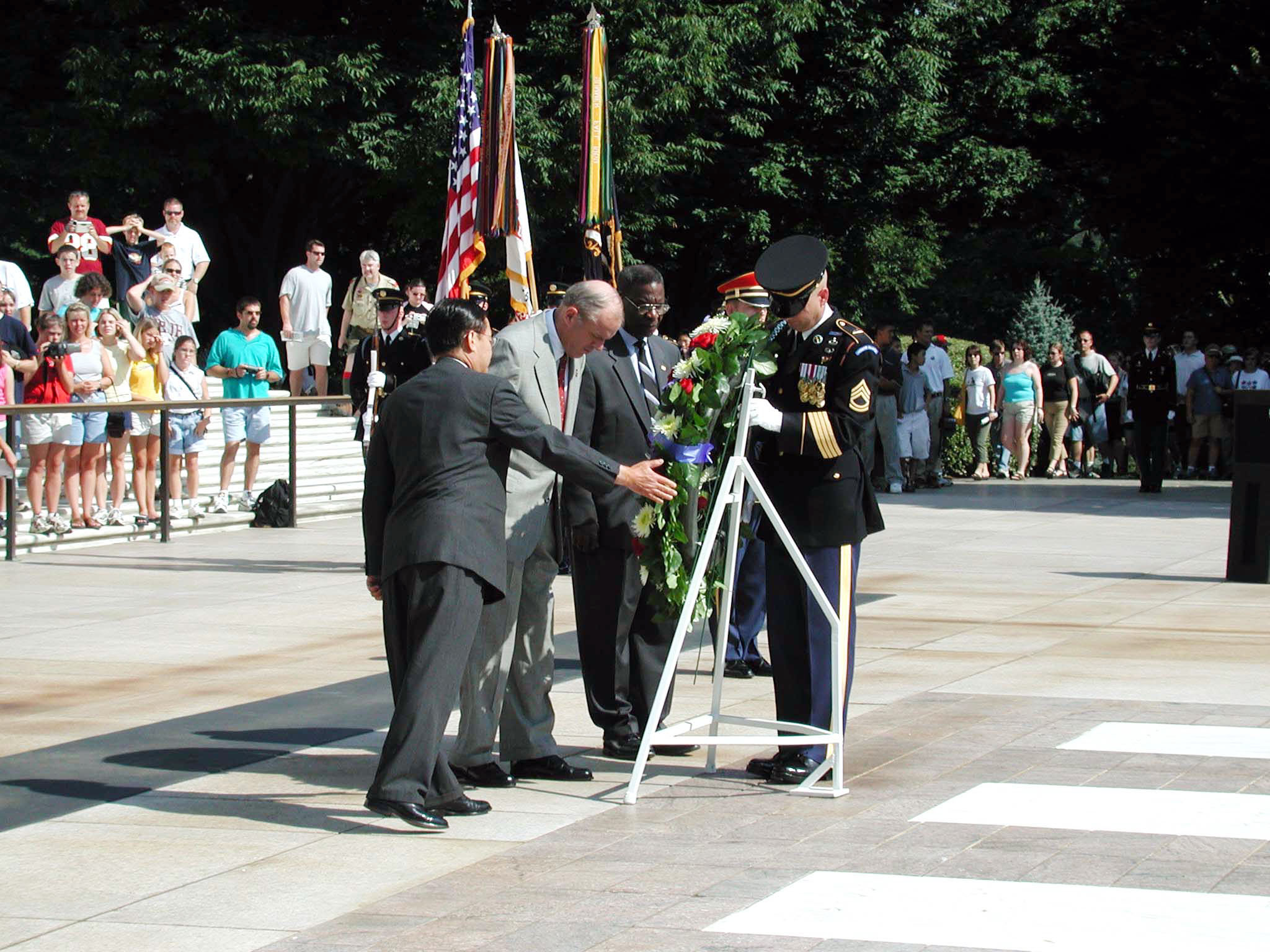
The South Korean ambassador to the United States Yang Sung-chul, Secretary of the Army Thomas E. White, and Becton at a July 2001 wreath-laying ceremony for African-American veterans of the Korean War.

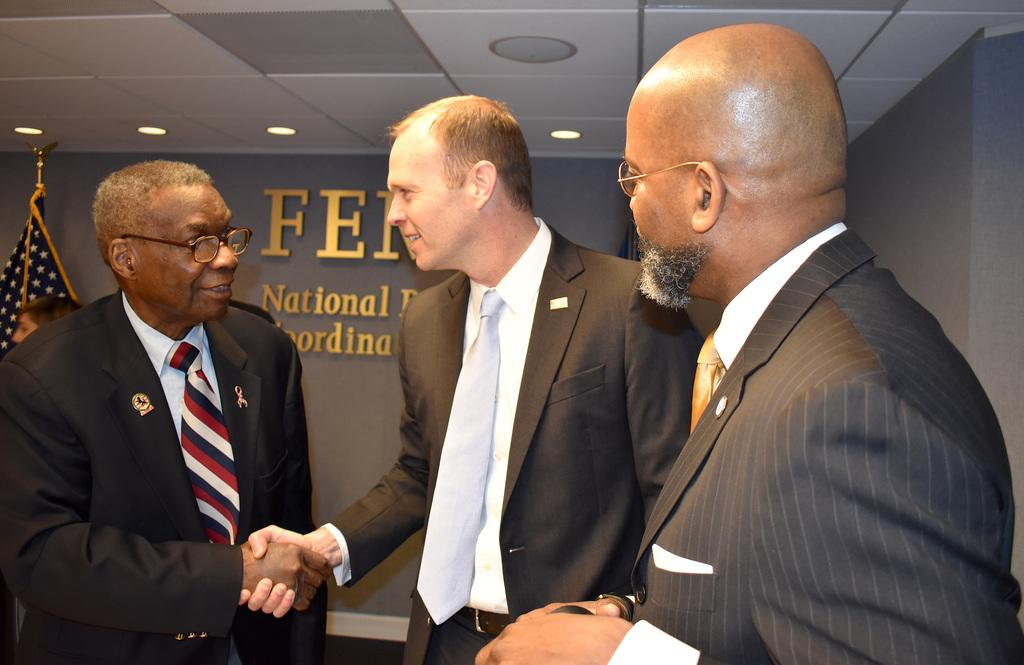
Becton (left) with FEMA director Brock Long in 2018

Becton went on to serve in the Korean War and the Vietnam War, eventually rising to the rank of lieutenant general in 1978 and command of VII Corps in Europe during the Cold War. Among his decorations were the Distinguished Service Medal, two Silver Stars, two Legion of Merit medals, and two Purple Hearts, along with the Knight Commander's Cross of the Order of Merit of Germany.

While in the service, Becton graduated from Prairie View Agricultural and Mechanical University (Bachelor's Degree in Mathematics in 1960), the University of Maryland (Master's Degree in Economics in 1966). He also graduated from the U.S. Army Command and General Staff College, the Armed Forces Staff College, and the National War College.

Becton retired from the U.S. Army in 1983, after nearly 40 years of service. However, his public service career was far from over. From 1984 to 1985, he served as the Director of the Office of Foreign Disaster Assistance in the United States Agency for International Development (US AID). He then served as the Director of FEMA from 1985 to 1989 under President Ronald Reagan.

In his mid-60s, Becton began a new career as an education administrator. From 1989 to 1994, Becton was the fifth president of Prairie View A&M University (his alma mater). President Becton was the first graduate of Prairie View A&M University to attain flag rank in the military.

In 1996, he became the Superintendent of the Washington, D.C. public school system.

Becton served as a director to several corporations, academic institutions, and associations. He was part of a group of retired military officers who spoke in favor of affirmative action to defend national security. His many honors include being named several times by Ebony magazine as "One of the 100 Most Influential Blacks in America," and he has also received the Distinguished Service Award Association of the U.S. Army and the Boy Scouts of America's Silver Beaver Award. His autobiography, Becton: Autobiography of a Soldier and Public Servant, was published in 2008 by Naval Institute Press.

== Personal life and death ==
Becton resided at The Fairfax in Fort Belvoir, Virginia. He was married to Louise Thornton from 1948 until her death in 2019. They had five children, 11 grandchildren, and eight great-grandchildren.

Julius W. Becton Jr. died at Fort Belvoir of complications of dementia on November 28, 2023, at the age of 97.

== Decorations ==

Combat Infantryman Badge with one star
1st Row	Army Distinguished Service Medal			
2nd Row	Silver Star with Oak Leaf Cluster	Legion of Merit with Oak Leaf Cluster	Distinguished Flying Cross	Bronze Star with Oak Leaf Cluster
3rd Row	Air Medal with Oak Leaf Cluster and "V" Device	Meritorious Service Medal	Army Commendation Medal with Oak Leaf Cluster	Purple Heart with Oak Leaf Cluster
4th Row	American Campaign Medal	Asiatic Pacific Campaign Medal	World War II Victory Medal	Army of Occupation Medal
5th Row	National Defense Service Medal with Oak Leaf Cluster	Korean Service Medal with one service star	Vietnam Service Medal with one service star	Philippine Independence Medal
6th Row	United Nations Korea Medal	Vietnam Gallantry Cross with Palm	Vietnam Campaign Medal	Grand Officer's Cross of the Order of Merit of the Federal Republic of Germany

Government offices
Preceded by Robert Morris; Acting	Director of the Federal Emergency Management Agency; 1985–1989	Succeeded by Robert Morris; Acting
