= Mokwon University =

Coordinates: 36°19′33.9″N 127°20′19″E

- 목원대학교
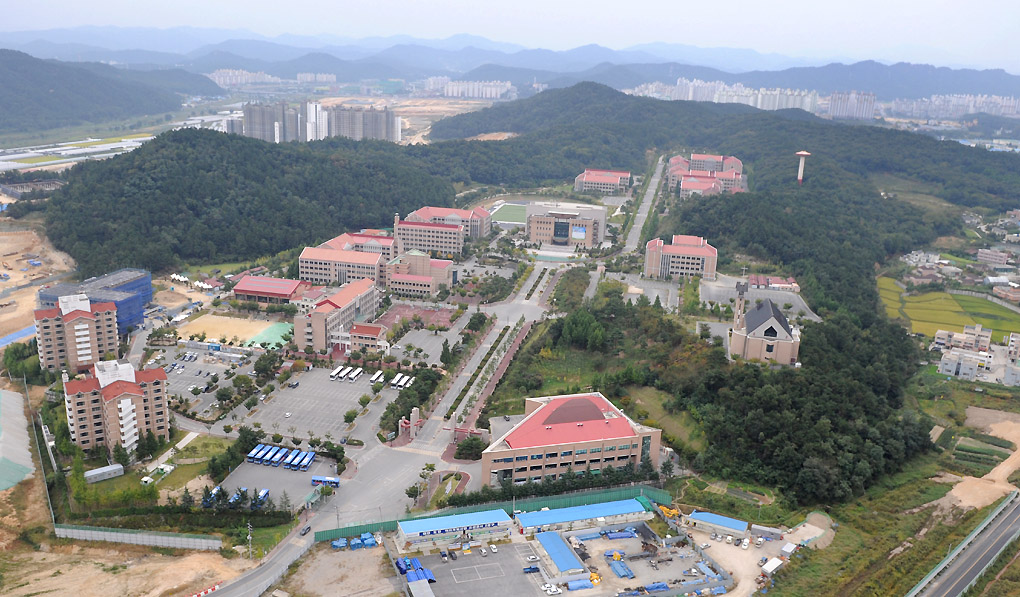
- Type: Private
- Established: 1954
- Founders: Charles D. Stokes
- Location: Daejeon, South Korea
- Website: www.mokwon.ac.kr

Korean name
- Hangul: 목원대학교
- Hanja: 牧園大學校
- RR: Mogwon daehakgyo
- MR: Mogwŏn taehakkyo

Mokwon University (Korean: 목원대학교) is a private university located in Daejeon, South Korea.

== History ==
Christian missionaries with the Methodist Church, Dr. Charles D. Stokes established the Mokwon University in 1954.
