= Han Sung-joo =

South Korean politician (born 1940)

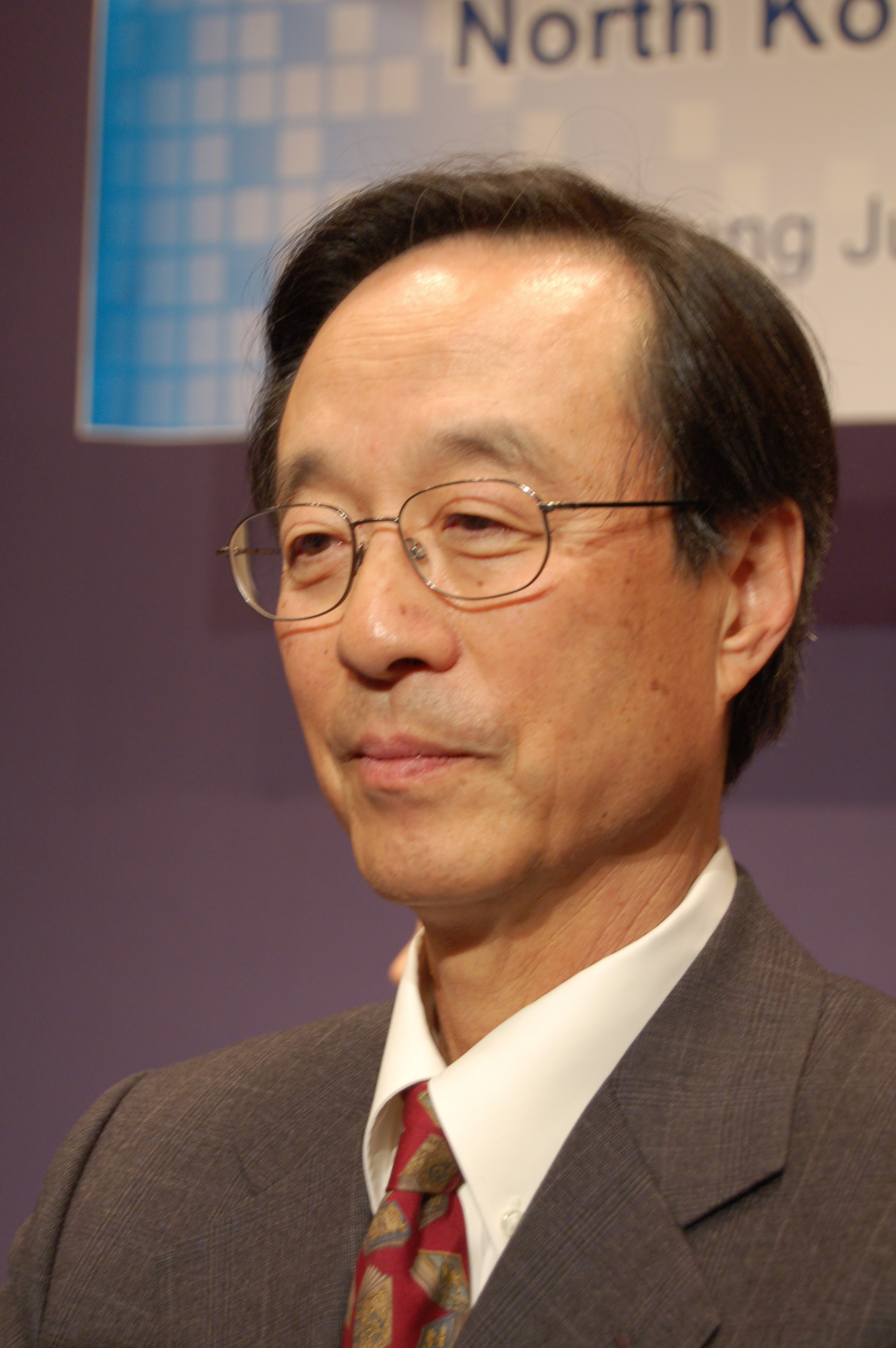

Minister of Foreign Affairs
- In office February 1993 – December 1994
- President: Kim Young-sam
- Prime Minister: Hwang In-sung
- Preceded by: Lee Sang-ock
- Succeeded by: Gong Ro-myung

South Korean Ambassador to the United States
- In office April 2003 – February 2005
- President: Roh Moo-hyun
- Prime Minister: Goh Kun
- Preceded by: Yang Sung-chul
- Succeeded by: Hong Seok-hyun

Personal details
- Born: 13 September 1940 (age 85) Korea
- Party: Independent
- Education: Seoul National University (BA); University of New Hampshire (MA); University of California, Berkeley (PhD)
- Occupation: Educator, diplomatist, diplomat, and politician

Han Sung-joo (Korean: 한승주; Hanja: 韓昇洲; born September 13, 1940) is a Korean educator, diplomatist, diplomat, and politician. Han is a member of Cheongju Han clan.

He was born in Keijō (Seoul), Korea, Empire of Japan on September 13, 1940.

He is a foreign diplomat of South Korea, former foreign minister and ambassador to the United States, and a diplomat who has been a professor since 1978 in the Department of Political Science and Diplomacy at Korea University.

After graduating from Seoul National University in 1962, he received a master's degree in political science from the University of New Hampshire in 1964 and a doctorate in political science from the University of California, Berkeley, in 1970. From February 1993 to December 1994, he was Minister of Foreign Affairs. In 2006, he retired from Korea University professorship. From June 2002 to February 2003 and from March 2007 to January 2008, he served as President of Korea University.

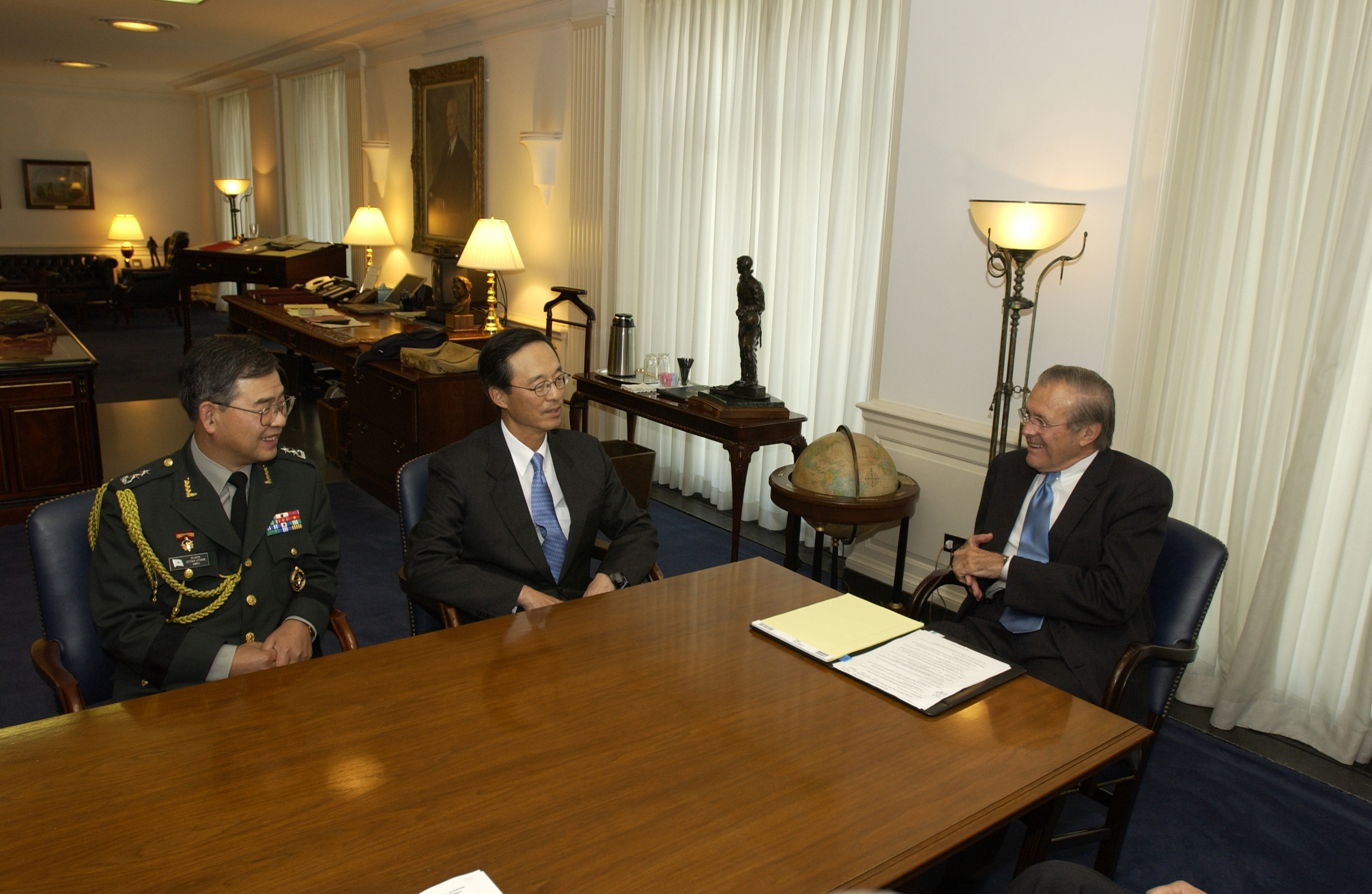
Secretary of Defense Donald H. Rumsfeld (right) meets in his Pentagon office with South Korean Ambassador to the United States Han Sung Joo (center) and Maj. Gen. Moon Young Han (left) on Oct. 1, 2004.

He was the Ambassador to the United States from April 2003 to February 2005.
