= Song Ja =

South Korean politician (1936–2019)

Minister of Education
- In office 7 August 2000 – 31 August 2000
- President: Kim Dae-jung
- Prime Minister: Lee Han-dong
- Preceded by: Moon Yong-lin
- Succeeded by: Lee Don-hee

Personal details
- Born: 2 December 1936 Daejeon, Korea, Empire of Japan
- Died: 22 August 2019 (aged 82) Seoul, South Korea
- Occupation: Politician; academic

Korean name
- Hangul: 송자
- Hanja: 宋梓
- RR: Song Ja
- MR: Song Cha

Song Ja (Korean: 송자; 6 December 1936 – 22 August 2019) was a South Korean politician and academic. He had served as chancellor of Yonsei University and Myongji University, and as Minister of Education.

== Career ==
Song was named a professor of business management at Yonsei University in 1977. He was elevated to the position of twelfth chancellor of Yonsei University in August 1992. In November 1994, Yang Dong-kwan of the Seoul Western District Court ruled that his nomination to the chancellorship had been invalid because he formally had not yet applied for restoration of South Korean citizenship at the time, and so was legally stateless. Song had naturalised as a U.S. citizen in 1978, but gave up U.S. citizenship in 1984. However, an appeal court ruled in May 1995 that his lack of citizenship was not sufficient reason to invalidate his nomination. In January 1997, Song announced that he was resigning from his professorship at Yonsei University.

In June 1997, Song was appointed chancellor of Myongji University, also in Seoul. He became Minister of Education in 2000 during the presidency of Kim Dae-jung. He was the third former Myongji University chancellor to receive a cabinet position in the past decade.

== Personal life ==
Song was born on 6 December 1936 in Daejeon, then known as Taiden. His family was part of the Eunjin Song bongwan. He graduated from Yonsei University in 1960 and received a scholarship from the U.S. to study at Washington University in St. Louis. He obtained U.S. permanent residence through adjustment of status in 1970. He was married and had two daughters.

Song died on 22 August 2019. His funeral was held at Yonsei University.
