= Lee Seok-hyun (politician) =

South Korean politician (born 1951)

- 이석현
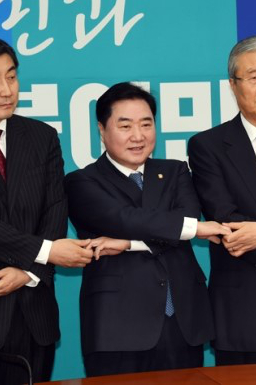

Deputy Speaker of the National Assembly
- In office 30 May 2014 – 29 May 2016 Serving with Jeong Kab-yoon
- Preceded by: Park Byeong-seug
- Succeeded by: Park Joo-sun

Member of the National Assembly
- In office 30 May 2004 – 29 May 2020
- Constituency: Gyeonggi Anyang Dongan A
- In office 30 May 1996 – 29 May 2000
- Constituency: Gyeonggi Anyang Dongan B
- In office 29 May 1996 – 30 May 1992
- Constituency: Gyeonggi Anyang B

Personal details
- Born: 16 March 1951 (age 75) Iksan, South Korea
- Party: Independent
- Education: Seoul National University

Korean name
- Hangul: 이석현
- Hanja: 李錫玄
- RR: I Seokhyeon
- MR: I Sŏkhyŏn

Lee Seok-hyun (Korean: 이석현; born 16 March 1951) is a South Korean politician used serving as the executive vice president of National Unification Advisory Council chaired by President Moon Jae-in from September 2021 to August 2022 previously served as Deputy Speaker of the National Assembly and its six-term parliamentarian.

Lee was first admitted to Seoul National University as its engineering student but quit to reapply to study law. During his studies, he actively participated in pro-democracy, student activism movement and produced and distributed its newspapers with Choi Gee-sung but was never imprisoned.

After finishing his studies, he started working for insurance company not preparing for bar exam - a typical route for law graduates - to avoid taking governmental roles under totalitarian regime of Park Chung Hee. He then founded pro-democracy civil organisation with Moon Hee-sang funded by the eldest son of Kim Dae-jung in 1980. With the martial law issued following the Seoul Spring, he tried to run away but was later captured and tortured by Defense Security Command.

In 1985 upon return from the United States, Kim Dae-jung employed him as his personal secretary. In 1988 he ran as a candidate of Kim's party but lost. In 1997 Lee, then-two term parliamentarian from Anyang, became the centre of politics when his business card which had his name in 7 languages marked nationality of his, South Korean, in a way used by North Koreans in Mandarin. He subsequently resigned from his party and stayed in Mountain Gyeryongsan. He returned to the party long after his party's victory in the 1997 South Korean presidential election. After losing the re-election in 2000 to Shim Jae-chul, he was appointed as CEO of Korea Environment Corporation run by Ministry of Environment under President Kim Dae-jung from 2000 to 2003. After returning to the National Assembly in 2004, Lee was elected as the chair of its Health and Welfare Committee. He also took chairmanship of its special committees on reforming the National Pension Service twice in 2005 and 2011, State-owned enterprise in 2008 and Low birth rate-Aging society in 2008. In 2014 he was elected as the Deputy Speaker of the Assembly. He is well known to the public for his chairing filibuster against controversial anti-terror bill at the plenary - most notably when Cho Won-jin tried to interrupt Lee's party parliamentarian's speech. In the 2020 election, he lost his primary and did not run for re-election. In 2021 he was appointed by then party leader Lee Nak-yon to lead party's campaign in two by-elections in two populous cities of the country, Seoul and Busan, as the head of its advisory board. In August 2021 President Moon Jae-in appointed him as his deputy at National Unification Advisory Council. Lee holds LLB from Seoul National University.

== Electoral history ==
Elections	Year	Constituency	Party affiliation	Votes	Percentage of votes	Results
13th National Assembly General Election	1988	Gyeonggi Anyang B	Peace Democratic Party	18,990	21.76%	Lost (2nd)
14th National Assembly General Election	1992	Gyeonggi Anyang B	Democratic Party	39,146	36.74%	Won
15th National Assembly General Election	1996	Gyeonggi Anyang Dongan B	National Congress for New Politics	27,330	42.34%	Won
16th National Assembly General Election	2000	Gyeonggi Anyang Dongan	Millennium Democratic Party	61,239	48.43%	Lost (2nd)
17th National Assembly General Election	2004	Gyeonggi Anyang Dongan A	Uri Party	41,913	51.56%	Won
18th National Assembly General Election	2008	Gyeonggi Anyang Dongan A	United Democratic Party	30,852	47.87%	Won
19th National Assembly General Election	2012	Gyeonggi Anyang Dongan A	Democratic United Party	43,869	54.86%	Won
20th National Assembly General Election	2016	Gyeonggi Anyang Dongan A	Democratic Party of Korea	45,680	50.05%	Won
22nd National Assembly General Election	2024	Seoul Gangbuk B	New Future Party	4,672	5.54%	Lost (3rd)
