= Yoon Jeung-hyun =

South Korean politician (born 1946)

- 윤증현
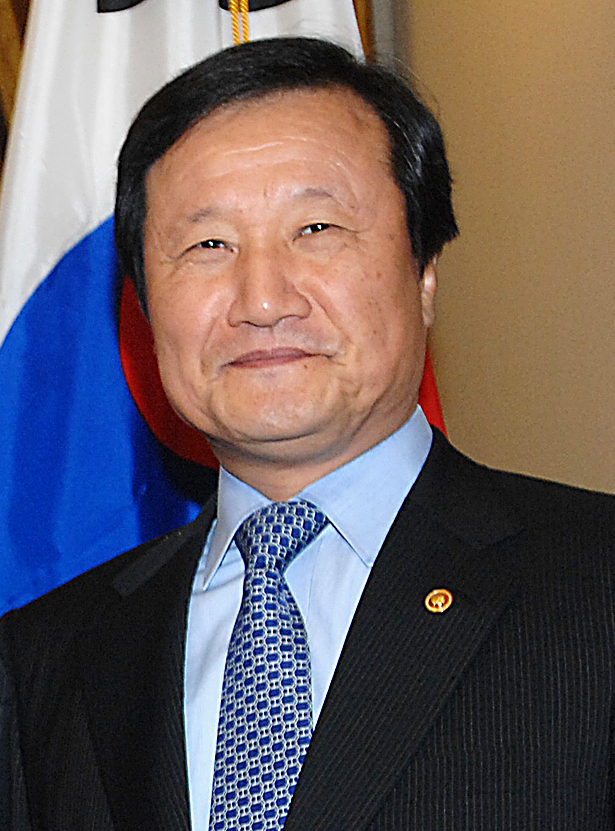

Acting Prime Minister of South Korea
- In office 11 August 2010 – 1 October 2010
- President: Lee Myung-bak
- Preceded by: Chung Un-chan
- Succeeded by: Kim Hwang-sik

Minister of Economy and Finance
- In office 10 February 2009 – 1 June 2011
- President: Lee Myung-bak
- Preceded by: Kang Man-soo
- Succeeded by: Bahk Jae-wan

Personal details
- Born: 19 September 1946 (age 80) Masan, southern Korea
- Education: Seoul National University

- Korean name
- Hangul: 윤증현
- Hanja: 尹增鉉
- RR: Yun Jeunghyeon
- MR: Yun Chŭnghyŏn

Yoon Jeung-hyun (born 19 September 1946) is a South Korean civil servant and politician who served as the acting prime minister of South Korea from August to October 2010.

== Early life ==
He was born in Masan, and graduated from Seoul National University. He became the Minister of Strategy and Finance on 10 February 2009.

Political offices
Preceded by Kang Man-soo	Minister of Economy and Finance; 2009–2011	Succeeded by Bahk Jae-wan
