= Kim Hwang-sik =

South Korean lawyer and politician

His Excellency Kim Hwang-sik
- 김황식
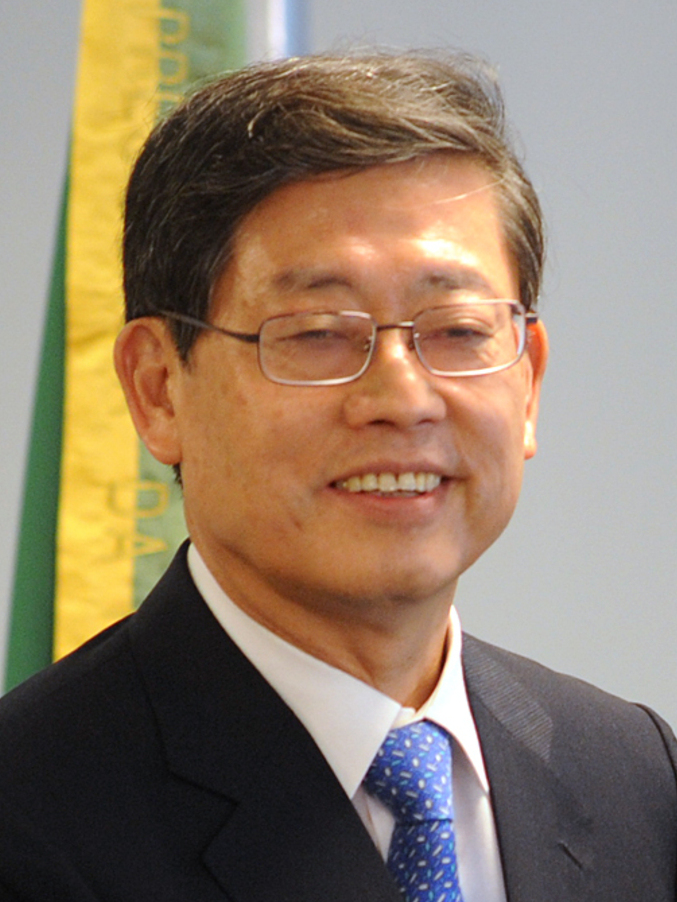
- Kim in 2011

41st Prime Minister of South Korea
- In office 1 October 2010 – 26 February 2013
- President: Lee Myung-bak
- Preceded by: Chung Un-chan; Yoon Jeung-hyun (acting)
- Succeeded by: Chung Hong-won

Personal details
- Born: 9 August 1948 (age 78) Jangseong, South Jeolla Province, southern Korea
- Education: Seoul National University (LLB)

Korean name
- Hangul: 김황식
- Hanja: 金滉植
- RR: Gim Hwangsik
- MR: Kim Hwangsik

Kim Hwang-sik (Korean: 김황식; Hanja: 金滉植; born 9 August 1948) is a South Korean lawyer and politician who served as the prime minister of South Korea from October 2010 to February 2013 under President Lee Myung-bak. He was the former Chairperson of the Board of Audit and Inspection (BAI). He was the only member in the Lee Myung-bak Government who came from the liberal Honam Region.

== Biography ==
He was born in Jangseong, studied law at Marburg University (Germany) and graduated from Seoul National University. He passed National Judicial Examination and had since made rounds through regional courts as a judge. He served as a Supreme Court justice from 2005 to 2008. He has served as the Chairperson of Board of Audit and Inspection from September 2008. On 16 September 2010, he was nominated as the new prime minister. After the National Assembly's confirmation hearing on 29 September, Kim was confirmed as the Prime Minister on October 1, 2010. Kim quit the BAI post just halfway into its four-year term; he was the second person to be appointed prime minister straight from the top BAI post after Lee Hoi-chang.

== Draft dodging controversy ==
Kim was exempted from being drafted for the two-year military service in 1972 by claiming to have a thyroid gland disorder. His brother ran the hospital which gave him the diagnosis. In 1973, he was exempted again due to an "extreme imbalance" between the vision in his left and right eyes, despite having played badminton at a high level throughout his teens. These inconsistencies were one of the main topics on which his confirmation hearing for the prime ministry focused.

Political offices
Preceded by Yoon Jeung-hyun; Acting	Prime Minister of South Korea; 2010–2013	Succeeded by Jung Hong-won
