= Lee Jang-moo =

South Korean mechanical engineer (born 1945)

- Hangul: 이장무
- Hanja: 李長茂
- RR: I Jangmu
- MR: I Changmu

Lee Jang-moo (Korean: 이장무; born May 14, 1945) is a professor of Seoul National University in the department of Mechanical Engineering and the current president of Seoul National University since July 2006.

Preceded by Chung Un-Chan	President of Seoul National University; July 2006 -	Succeeded by Incumbent
