= Chung Un-chan =

Prime Minister of South Korea from 2009 to 2010

His Excellency Chung Un-chan
- 정운찬
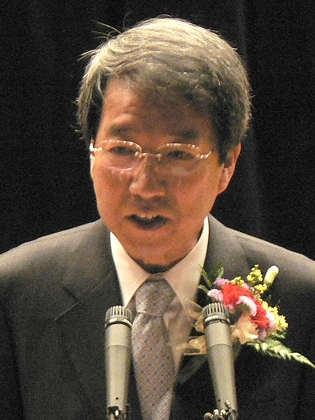
- Chung as Seoul National University president, 2006

40th Prime Minister of South Korea
- In office 29 September 2009 – 11 August 2010
- President: Lee Myung-bak
- Preceded by: Han Seung-soo
- Succeeded by: Yoon Jeung-hyun (acting); Kim Hwang-sik

Personal details
- Born: 21 March 1947 (age 79) Gongju, southern Korea
- Party: Independent
- Education: Seoul National University (BA); Miami University (MA); Princeton University (PhD)
- Profession: Economist; Professor

Korean name
- Hangul: 정운찬
- Hanja: 鄭雲燦
- RR: Jeong Unchan
- MR: Chŏng Unch'an

Chung Un-chan (Korean: 정운찬; born 21 March 1947) is a South Korean academic and politician who served as the prime minister of South Korea from 2009 to 2010. He was an economics professor at Seoul National University from 1978 to 2009, serving as president of the university from 2002 to 2006. Chung also served as the 22nd commissioner of the Korea Baseball Organization from 2018 to 2020.

== Early life and education ==
Chung Un-chan was born 21 March 1947, in Gongju. He received a bachelor of arts in economics from Seoul National University in 1970 and a master's degree in economics from Miami University (Ohio) in 1972. Chung received a Ph.D. in economics from Princeton University in 1978 after completing a doctoral dissertation titled "Toward a theory of the price setting banking firm." In October 2004, Chung was awarded an honorary degree in international education at the Far Eastern National University in Vladivostok, Russia.

== Career ==
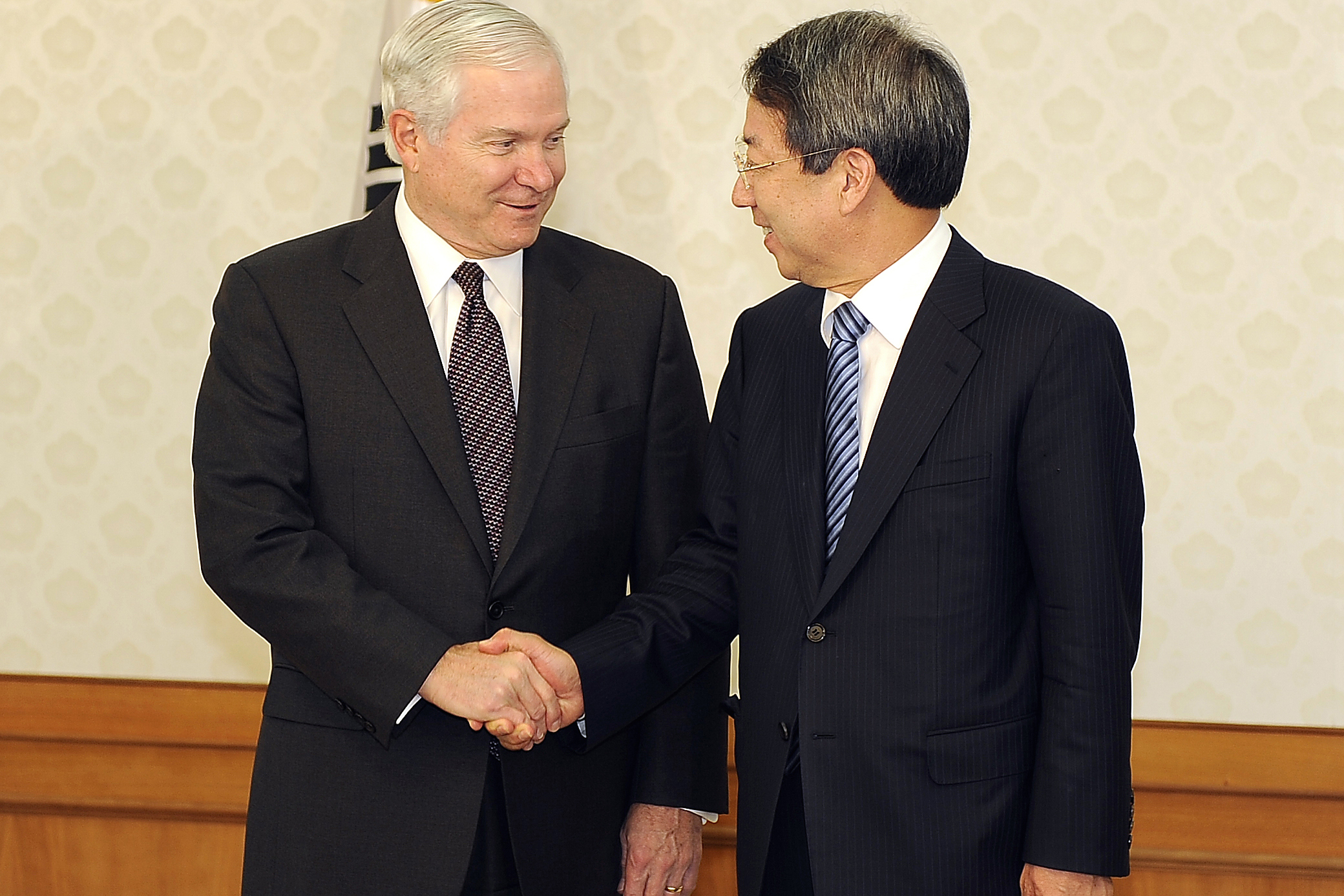
Chung with U.S. Defense Secretary Robert Gates at Government Complex Seoul in 2009

Chung began his academic career as a business associate and assistant professor at Columbia University from 1976 to 1978. After three years of teaching money and financial markets at the university, Chung returned to Seoul National University in late 1978 as a member of the faculty of economics. Prior to his appointment as Seoul National University president in 2002, Chung was dean of the college of social sciences in the first half of 2002. Chung served as president of the university until 2006.

Chung was a visiting associate professor at the University of Hawaiʻi at Mānoa in 1983, a visiting scholar at the London School of Economics from 1986 to 1987, and a visiting professor at Ruhr University Bochum in 1999. Chung continues to write and conduct research in macroeconomics and financial markets. He has numerous publications in both Korean and English.

Chung has held senior positions in government commissions and private research institutions. From 1995 to 1997, he served as a senior advisor to the Seoul Metropolitan Government's Policy Advisory Committee. Since 1996, he has been the director of the Suam Educational and Cultural Foundation. From 1998 to 1999, he was president of the Korean Money and Finance Association, and from 1998 to 2001, he served as director of the Korea Council of Economic and Social Research Institutes. Between 2000 and 2001, he held the position of chairperson of the Financial Development Committee within the Ministry of Economy and Finance. In 2002, he served as chairperson of the Committee on National Pension Development. From 2006 to 2007, he was President of the Korean Economic Association.

Chung had topped the list of potential candidates the ruling Uri Party camp would like to recruit at the 2007 presidential election, but he didn't enter the party.

=== Premiership (2009–2010) ===
On 3 September 2009, Chung was nominated as Prime Minister of South Korea by president Lee Myung-bak. At the parliamentary confirmation hearing, he said that a government plan to relocate nine ministries and four major administration bodies to the newly created Sejong City in central South Korea would lead to nationwide inefficiency. Opposition parties including Democratic Party threatened to vote against him, but he was approved in the National Assembly of South Korea and assumed office as the 40th prime minister on 30 September 2009.

After assuming office, the Sejong City plan faced an uphill political battle and opposition parties vowed opposition toward him. After the 2010 South Korean local elections, he expressed willingness to resign. He offered his resignation on 29 July and stepped down on 10 August after 10 months of bitter political experience.

== Private life ==
Chung is a fan of baseball. He is a fan of the Doosan Bears, the Korean baseball team, and the New York Yankees. Chung was the 22nd commissioner of the Korea Baseball Organization from 2018 to 2020.

Academic offices
Preceded by Lee Ki-joon	President of Seoul National University; 2002–2006	Succeeded by Lee Jang-moo
Political offices
Preceded by Han Seung-soo	Prime Minister of South Korea; 2009–2010	Succeeded by Yoon Jeung-hyun; Acting
