= Kim Ok-gil =

South Korean politician

Kim Ok-gil (Korean: 김옥길; 1921–1990) was a South Korean politician.

She was appointed Minister of Education in 1979.
