= List of members of the National Assembly (South Korea), 2020–2024 =

21st National Assembly of South Korea
| ← | 20th | 22nd | → |
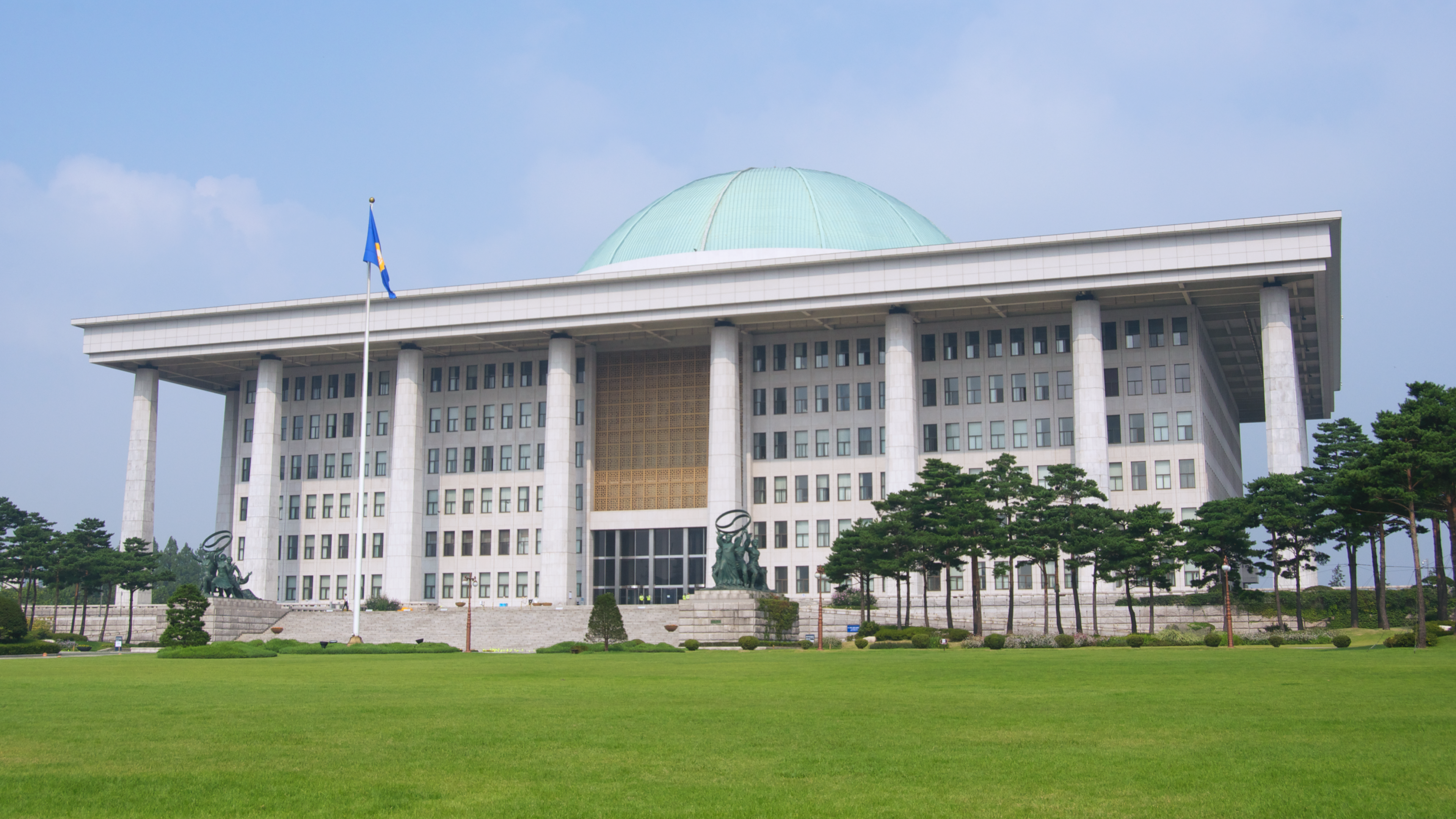
- The National Assembly Proceeding Hall

Overview
- Legislative body: National Assembly of South Korea
- Meeting place: National Assembly Proceeding Hall
- Term: 30 May 2020 – 29 May 2024
- Election: 2020 South Korean legislative election
- Government: Moon Jae-in government (until 10 May 2022); Yoon Suk Yeol government (since 10 May 2022)

National Assembly
- Members: 300
- Speaker: Park Byeong-seug (until 29 May 2022); Kim Jin-pyo (since 4 July 2022)
- Deputy Speakers: Kim Sang-hee (Democratic) (5 June 2020 – 29 May 2022) Chung Jin-suk (People Power (31 August 2021 – 10 November 2022); Kim Young-joo (People Power) (Note: originally elected as the deputy speaker belonging to the Democratic Party, removed from office on 2 May 2024 for changing party affiliation) (4 July 2022 – 2 May 2024) Chung Woo-taik (People Power) (since 10 November 2022)
- Prime Minister: Chung Sye-kyun (Democratic) (30 May 2020 – 16 April 2021) Kim Boo-kyum (Democratic) (14 May 2021 – 11 May 2022) Han Duck-soo (Independent) (since 21 May 2022)

The 21st National Assembly of South Korea was the twenty-first session of the National Assembly which first convened on 30 May 2020 and was seated until 29 May 2024. Its members were first elected in the 2020 legislative election held on 15 April 2020.

== Composition ==
In the 2020 legislative election, more than five political parties were elected to the Assembly.

| Party | Original elected seats | | | Current seats | | | Floor leader |
| Party | Con. | PR | Total | ± | Total | % | Floor leader |
|---|---|---|---|---|---|---|---|
| Democratic Party | 163 | —N/a | 163 | ▼8 | 155 | 51.7% | Park Chan-dae |
| Platform Party | —N/a | 17 | 17 | merged into Democratic. | | | Park Chan-dae |
| People Power Party | 84 | —N/a | 84 | ▲29 | 113 | 37.7% | Choo Kyung-ho |
| Future Korea Party | —N/a | 19 | 19 | merged into People Power. | | | Choo Kyung-ho |
| Justice Party | 1 | 5 | 6 | Steady | 6 | 2.0% | Jang Hye-young |
| Open Democratic Party | —N/a | 3 | 3 | merged into Democratic. | | | |
| People Party | —N/a | 3 | 3 | merged into People Power. | | | |
| Democratic Alliance | —N/a | —N/a | —N/a | merged into Democratic. | | | |
| People Future Party | —N/a | —N/a | —N/a | merged into People Power. | | | |
| New Future | —N/a | —N/a | —N/a | ▲5 | 5 | 1.6% | Kim Jong-min |
| New Reform | —N/a | —N/a | —N/a | ▲4 | 4 | 1.3% | Yang Hyang-ja |
| Progressive Party | —N/a | —N/a | —N/a | ▲1 | 1 | 0.3% | Kang Sung-hee |
| Liberty Unification | —N/a | —N/a | —N/a | ▲1 | 1 | 0.3% | Hwangbo Seung-hee |
| Rebuilding Korea | —N/a | —N/a | —N/a | ▲1 | 1 | 0.3% | Hwang Un-ha |
| Independent | 5 | —N/a | 5 | ▲4 | 9 | 3.0% | |
| Vacant | —N/a | —N/a | —N/a | ▲3 | 3 | 1.0% | |
| Totals | 253 | 47 | 300 | — | 300 | 100.0% | |

== Changes ==
=== Changes in party affiliation ===
| Date | Member | Constituency | From | To | Notes |
|---|---|---|---|---|---|
| 7 May 2020 | Yang Jeong-suk | Proportional | Platform | Independent | Expelled from the Platform Party on charges of dodging taxes and using relative's names without consent for property assets. |
| 12 May 2020 | Yong Hye-in | Proportional | Platform | Independent | Expelled from the Platform Party in order to return to respective parties |
| 12 May 2020 | Cho Jung-hun | Proportional | Platform | Independent | Expelled from the Platform Party in order to return to respective parties |
| 13 May 2020 | Yong Hye-in | Proportional | Independent | Basic Income | Returned to the Basic Income Party |
| 13 May 2020 | Cho Jung-hun | Proportional | Independent | Transition Korea | Returned to Transition Korea |
| 18 May 2020 | All 14 members of the Platform Party | Proportional | Platform | Democratic | Merged into the Democratic Party |
| 29 May 2020 | All 19 members of the Future Korea Party | Proportional | Future Korea | United Future | Merged into the United Future Party |
| 5 June 2020 | Park Byeong-seug | Seo A, Daejeon | Democratic | Independent | Elected as Speaker of the National Assembly (Note: South Korea's National Assembly Act requires the Speaker to officially sit as an independent) |
| 17 September 2020 | Kweon Seong-dong | Gangneung | Independent | People Power | Returned to the People Power Party |
| 18 September 2020 | Kim Hong-geol | Proportional | Democratic | Independent | Expelled from the Democratic Party for allegedly underreporting net worth and real estate investments |
| 23 September 2020 | Park Duk-hyum | Boeun–Okcheon–Yeongdong–Goesan | People Power | Independent | Left the People Power Party over corruption allegations |
| 24 September 2020 | Lee Sang-jik | Jeonju B | Democratic | Independent | Left the Democratic Party for allegedly bankrupting Eastar Jet while serving as CEO |
| 22 December 2020 | Chun Bong-min | Suyeong | People Power | Independent | Left the People Power Party for receiving unregistered property gifts from his father |
| 7 January 2021 | Kim Tae-ho | Sancheong–Hamyang–Geochang–Hapcheon | Independent | People Power | Returned to the People Power Party |
| 7 January 2021 | Kim Byong-wook | Pohang Nam–Ulleung | People Power | Independent | Left the People Power Party for alleged sexual assault |
| 14 April 2021 | Song Eon-seok | Gimcehon | People Power | Independent | Expelled from the People Power Party over physical altercations with party officials |
| 21 May 2021 | Kim Byong-wook | Pohang Nam–Ulleung | Independent | People Power | Returned to the People Power Party after sexual assault charges were dropped |
| 22 June 2021 | Yang Yiwon-young | Proportional | Democratic | Independent | Expelled for allegedly violating the Agricultural Land Act |
| 22 June 2021 | Yoon Mee-hyang | Proportional | Democratic | Independent | Expelled for property related controversies |
| 24 June 2021 | Hong Joon-pyo | Suseong B | Independent | People Power | Returned to the People Power Party |
| 13 July 2021 | Yang Hyang-ja | Seo B, Gwangju | Democratic | Independent | Left the Democratic Party over sexual misconduct amongst office aides |
| 5 August 2021 | Yoon Sang-hyun | Dong–Michuhol B | Independent | People Power | Returned to the People Power Party |
| 27 August 2021 | Song Eon-seok | Gimcehon | Independent | People Power | Reinstated by the People Power Party |
| 26 September 2021 | Kwak Sang-do | Jung–Nam | People Power | Independent | Left the People Power Party after media reports revealed that his son embezzled 5 billion won (US$4.24 million) |
| 8 October 2021 | Yang Yiwon-young | Proportional | Independent | Democratic | Returned to the Democratic Party |
| 2 December 2021 | Chun Bong-min | Suyeong | Independent | People Power | Returned to the People Power Party |
| 7 December 2021 | Lee Yong-ho | Namwon–Imsil–Sunchang | Independent | People Power | Joined the People Power Party |
| 30 December 2021 | Park Duk-hyum | Boeun–Okcheon–Yeongdong–Goesan | Independent | People Power | Returned to the People Power Party |
| 14 January 2022 | All 3 members of the Open Democratic Party | Proportional | Open Democratic Party | Democratic | Open Democratic Party merged into the Democratic Party |
| 28 June 2023 | Yang Hyang-ja | Seo B, Gwangju | Independent | Hope of Korea | Founded Hope of Korea party |
| 24 January 2024 | Yang Hyang-ja | Seo B, Gwangju | Hope of Korea | New Reform | Hope of Korea party merged into New Reform |

=== Resignations and recalls ===
| Date | Member | Constituency | Party | Notes |
|---|---|---|---|---|
| 24 March 2021 | Kim Jinai | Proportional | Open Democratic | Resigned Succeeded by Kim Eui-kyeom on 25 March 2021 |
| 28 August 2021 | Jeong Jeong-soon | Cheongju Sangdang | Democratic | Recalled due to campaign financing violations |
| 13 September 2021 | Yoon Hee-suk | Seocho A | People Power | Resigned for allegedly engaging in real estate speculation |
| 15 September 2021 | Lee Nak-yon | Jongno | Democratic | Resigned to run for President of South Korea |
| 30 September 2021 | Lee Kyu-min | Anseong | Democratic | Recalled due to violating the Public Official Election Act |
| 11 November 2021 | Kwak Sang-do | Jung–Nam | Independent | Resigned due to controversies surrounding his son's embezzlement of 5 billion won |
| 25 January 2024 | Lee Eun-joo | Proportional | Justice | Resigned due violations of the Public Elections Act. Replaced by Jasmine Lee |
| 29 Jan 2024 | Ryu Ho-jeong | Proportional | Justice | Resigned due to leaving the Party. Replaced by Yang Gyeong-gyu. |

== List of members ==
=== Constituency ===
==== Seoul ====
| Constituency | Member | Party | Notes |
|---|---|---|---|
| Jongno | ~~Lee Nak-yeon~~ | ~~Democratic Party~~ | Resigned on 8 September 2021 to run for President |
| Jongno | Choi Jae-hyung | People Power | Elected March 9, 2022 |
| Jung–Seongdong A | Hong Ihk-pyo | Democratic Party | |
| Jung–Seongdong B | Park Sung-joon | Democratic Party | |
| Yongsan | Kwon Yeong-se | People Power | |
| Gwangjin A | Jeon Hye-sook | ~~Democratic Party~~; Independent | Left Democratic on 11 February 2024 citing ideological differences with Party leader Lee Jae-myung and for not being renominated by the Party for the 2024 election. |
| Gwangjin B | Ko Min-jung | Democratic Party | |
| Dongdaemun A | Ahn Gyu-baek | Democratic Party | |
| Dongdaemun B | Jang Kyung-tae | Democratic Party | |
| Jungnang A | Seo Young-kyo | Democratic Party | |
| Jungnang B | Park Hong-keun | Democratic Party | |
| Seongbuk A | Kim Young-bae | Democratic Party | |
| Seongbuk B | Ki Dong-min | Democratic Party | |
| Gangbuk A | Chun Joon-ho | Democratic Party | |
| Gangbuk B | Park Yong-jin | Democratic Party | |
| Dobong A | In Jae-keun | Democratic Party | |
| Dobong B | Oh Gi-hyung | Democratic Party | |
| Nowon A | Koh Yong-jin | Democratic Party | |
| Nowon B | Woo Won-shik | Democratic Party | |
| Nowon C | Kim Seong-hwan | Democratic Party | |
| Eunpyeong A | Park Joo-min | Democratic Party | |
| Eunpyeong B | Kang Byung-won | Democratic Party | |
| Seodaemun A | Woo Sang-ho | Democratic Party | |
| Seodaemun B | Kim Yeong-ho | Democratic Party | |
| Mapo A | Noh Woong-rae | Democratic Party | |
| Mapo B | Jung Chung-rae | Democratic Party | |
| Yangcheon A | Hwang Hee | Democratic Party | |
| Yangcheon B | Lee Yong-seon | Democratic Party | |
| Gangseo A | Kang Sun-woo | Democratic Party | |
| Gangseo B | Jin Seong-jun | Democratic Party | |
| Gangseo C | Han Jeoung-ae | Democratic Party | |
| Guro A | Lee In-young | Democratic Party | |
| Guro B | Youn Kun-young | Democratic Party | |
| Geumcheon | Choi Ki-sang | Democratic Party | |
| Yeongdeungpo A | Kim Young-joo | ~~Democratic Party~~; ~~Independent~~; People Power | Vice-Speaker of the National Assembly. Left Democratic on 21 February 2024 after being singled out for having bottom 20% performance rating as a lawmaker. Joined People Power 3 March 2024. |
| Yeongdeungpo B | Kim Min-seok | Democratic Party | |
| Dongjak A | Kim Byung-kee | Democratic Party | |
| Dongjak B | Lee Sujin | ~~Democratic Party~~; Independent | Left Democratic on 23 February 2024 due to ideological differences with Party leader Lee Jae-myung and not being renominated for the next election. |
| Gwanak A | Yoo Ki-hong | Democratic Party | |
| Gwanak B | Jeong Tae-ho | Democratic Party | |
| Seocho A | ~~Yoon Hee-sook~~ | ~~People Power~~ | Informed Party leadership on 25 August 2021 she intends on retiring after the reports published by the Anti-Corruption and Civil Rights Commission. Resigned 14 September 2021. |
| Seocho A | Cho Eun-hee | People Power | Elected March 9, 2022 |
| Seocho B | Park Sung-joong | People Power | |
| Gangnam A | Thae Ku-min | People Power | |
| Gangnam B | Park Jin | People Power | |
| Gangnam C | Yu Kyung-jun | People Power | |
| Songpa A | Kim Woong | People Power | |
| Songpa B | Bae Hyun-jin | People Power | |
| Songpa C | Nam In-soon | Democratic Party | |
| Gangdong A | Jin Sun-mee | Democratic Party | |
| Gangdong B | Lee Hae-sik | Democratic Party | |

==== Busan ====
| Constituency | Member | Party | Notes |
|---|---|---|---|
| Jung–Yeongdo | Hwangbo Seung-hee | ~~People Power~~; ~~Independent~~; Liberty Unification | Left People Power on 18 June 2023 over illegal political funds and controversy about private life Joined Liberty Unification on 8 March 2024. |
| Seo–Dong | Ahn Byung-gil | People Power | |
| Busanjin A | Suh Byung-soo | People Power | |
| Busanjin B | Lee Hun-seung | People Power | |
| Dongnae | Kim Hee-gon | People Power | |
| Nam A | Park Soo-young | People Power | |
| Nam B | Park Jae-ho | Democratic Party | |
| Buk–Gangseo A | Chun Jae-soo | Democratic Party | |
| Buk–Gangseo B | Kim Do-eup | People Power | |
| Haeundae A | Ha Tae-keung | People Power | |
| Haeundae B | Kim Mee-ae | People Power | |
| Saha A | Choi In-ho | Democratic Party | |
| Saha B | Cho Kyoung-tae | People Power | |
| Geumjeong | Paik Jong-hun | People Power | |
| Yeonje | Lee Joo-hwan | People Power | Asked by the Party leader Lee Jun-seok to remove himself from the Party on 24 August 2021 for violating the Anti-Corruption and Civil Rights Commission reports. Party withdrew their request on 25 November 2021. |
| Suyeong | Chun Bong-min | ~~People Power~~; ~~Independent~~; People Power | Left People Power on 22 December 2020 over receiving unregistered property gifts from his father. Readmitted 2 December 2021. |
| Sasang | Chang Je-won | People Power | |
| Gijang | Chung Dong-man | People Power | |

==== Daegu ====
| Constituency | Member | Party | Notes |
|---|---|---|---|
| Jung–Nam | ~~Kwak Sang-do~~ | ~~People Power~~; ~~Independent~~ | Left the People Power 25 September 2021 after media reports revealed that his son embezzled 5 billion won (US$4.24 million). Resigned from Parliament on 3 October 2021. |
| Jung–Nam | Im Byeong-heon | ~~Independent~~; People Power | Elected March 9, 2022. Rejoined People Power. |
| Dong A | Yoo Sung-kull | People Power | |
| Dong B | Kang Dae-sik | People Power | |
| Seo | Kim Sang-hoon | People Power | |
| Buk A | Yang Geum-hee | People Power | |
| Buk B | Kim Seung-soo | People Power | |
| Suseong A | Joo Ho-young | People Power | |
| Suseong B | Hong Joon-pyo | ~~Independent~~; ~~People Power~~ | Readmitted to the People Power Party on 24 June 2021. Resigned to run for Daegu Mayor in 2022. |
| Suseong B | Lee In-seon | People Power | Elected 1 June 2022 |
| Dalseo A | Hong Seok-joon | People Power | |
| Dalseo B | Yoon Jae-ok | People Power | |
| Dalseo C | Kim Yong-pan | ~~People Power~~; People Future | Joined People Future 22 March 2024. |
| Dalseong | Choo Kyung-ho | People Power | |

==== Incheon ====
| Constituency | Member | Party | Notes |
|---|---|---|---|
| Jung–Ganghwa–Ongjin | Bae Jun-yeong | People Power | |
| Dong–Michuhol A | Heo Jong-sik | Democratic Party | |
| Dong–Michuhol B | Yoon Sang-hyun | ~~Independent~~; People Power | Rejoined People Power on 5 August 2021 |
| Yeonsu A | Park Chan-dae | Democratic Party | |
| Yeonsu B | Chung Il-yung | Democratic Party | |
| Namdong A | Maeng Sung-kyu | Democratic Party | |
| Namdong B | Youn Kwan-suk | ~~Democratic Party~~; Independent | Left Democratic 3 May 2023 after bribing party officials with money. |
| Bupyeong A | Lee Seong-man | ~~Democratic Party~~; Independent | Left Democratic 3 May 2023 after bribing party officials with money. |
| Bupyeong B | Hong Young-pyo | ~~Democratic Party~~; New Future | Left Democratic on March 7, 2023 due to factional infighting |
| Gyeyang A | Yoo Dong-soo | Democratic Party | |
| Gyeyang B | ~~Song Young-gil~~ | ~~Democratic Party~~ | Resigned to Run for Seoul Mayor in 2022. |
| Gyeyang B | Lee Jae-myung | Democratic Party | Elected 1 June 2022 |
| Seo A | Kim Kyo-heung | Democratic Party | |
| Seo B | Shin Dong-kun | Democratic Party | |

==== Gwangju ====
| Constituency | Member | Party | Notes |
|---|---|---|---|
| Dong–Nam A | Yoon Young-deok | ~~Democratic Party~~; Democratic Alliance | Joined Democratic Alliance 3 March 2024. |
| Dong–Nam B | Lee Byeong-hoon | Democratic Party | |
| Seo A | Song Kap-seok | Democratic Party | |
| Seo B | Yang Hyang-ja | ~~Democratic Party~~; ~~Independent~~; ~~Hope of Korea~~; New Reform | Voluntarily left the Party on 15 July 2021 after reports of sexual misconduct amongst her office workers; first failing to report such misconduct and then denying it happened. Founded Hope of Korea on 24 June 2023. Merged Party with New Reform on 23 January 2024. |
| Buk A | Cho Oh-seop | Democratic Party | |
| Buk B | Lee Hyung-seok | ~~Democratic Party~~; Democratic Alliance | Joined Democratic Alliance 20 March 2024. |
| Gwangsan A | Lee Yong-bin | ~~Democratic Party~~; Democratic Alliance | Joined Democratic Alliance 20 March 2024. |
| Gwangsan B | Min Hyung-bae | ~~Democratic Party~~; ~~Independent~~; Democratic Party | Suddenly left Democratic on 20 April 2022. No explanation has been given. Returned to Democratic on 26 April 2023. |

==== Daejeon ====
| Constituency | Member | Party | Notes |
|---|---|---|---|
| Dong | Jang Cheol-min | Democratic Party | |
| Jung | Hwang Un-ha | ~~Democratic Party~~; Rebuilding Korea | Left Democratic on 8 March 2024 and joined Korea Innovation. |
| Seo A | Park Byeong-seug | ~~Independent (Speaker)~~; Democratic Party | Left automatically Democratic on 6 June 2020 due to the act of the National Assembly after he was elected as the Speaker of South Korean National Assembly on 5 June 2020. Rejoined Democratic 27 May 2022 after term expired. |
| Seo B | Park Beom-kye | Democratic Party | |
| Yuseong A | Cho Seung-rae | Democratic Party | |
| Yuseong B | Lee Sang-min | ~~Democratic Party~~; ~~Independent~~; People Power | Left Democratic on 4 December 2023 citing ideological differences with Party leader Lee Jae-Myeong. Joined People Power on 7 January 2024. |
| Daedeok | Park Young-soon | ~~Democratic Party~~; New Future | Left Democratic on 27 February 2024. Joined New Future. |

==== Ulsan ====
| Constituency | Member | Party | Notes |
|---|---|---|---|
| Jung | Park Seong-min | People Power | |
| Nam A | Lee Chae-ik | People Power | |
| Nam B | Kim Gi-hyeon | People Power | |
| Dong | Kwon, Myeong-ho | People Power | |
| Buk | Lee Sang-heon | ~~Democratic Party~~; Independent | Left Democratic on 29 February 2024 after not being renominated for the 2024 election. |
| Ulju | Seo Beom-soo | People Power | |

==== Sejong ====
| Constituency | Member | Party | Notes |
|---|---|---|---|
| Sejong A | Hong Seong-guk | Democratic Party | |
| Sejong B | Kang Jun-hyeon | Democratic Party | |

==== Gyeonggi ====
| Constituency | Member | Party | Notes |
|---|---|---|---|
| Suwon A | Kim Seung-won | Democratic Party | |
| Suwon B | Baek Hye-ryun | Democratic Party | |
| Suwon C | Kim Young-joon | Democratic Party | |
| Suwon D | Park Kwang-on | Democratic Party | |
| Suwon E | Kim Jin-pyo | ~~Democratic Party~~; Independent (Speaker) | Left automatically Democratic on 4 July 2022 due to the act of the National Assembly after he was elected as the Speaker of South Korean National Assembly. |
| Seongnam Sujeong | Kim Tae-nyeon | Democratic Party | |
| Seongnam Jungwon | Yoon Young-chan | Democratic Party | |
| Seongnam Bundang A | ~~Kim Eun-hye~~ | ~~People Power~~ | Resigned to Run for Gyeonggi Governor in 2022. |
| Seongnam Bundang A | Ahn Cheol-soo | People Power | Elected 1 June 2022. |
| Seongnam Bundang B | Kim Byung-wook | Democratic Party | |
| Uijeongbu A | Oh Young-hwan | ~~Democratic Party~~; New Future | Left Democratic on 17 March 2024 and joined New Future. |
| Uijeongbu B | Kim Min-cheol | ~~Democratic Party~~; Democratic Alliance | Joined Democratic Alliance 20 March 2024. |
| Anyang Manan | Kang Deuk-ku | Democratic Party | |
| Anyang Dongan A | Min Byeong-deok | Democratic Party | |
| Anyang Dongan B | Lee Jae-jung | Democratic Party | |
| Bucheon A | Kim Gyeong-hyeop | Democratic Party | |
| Bucheon B | Sul Hoon | ~~Democratic Party~~; ~~Independent~~; New Future | Left Democratic on 28 February 2024 citing ideological differences with leader Lee Jae-myung. Joined New Future on 17 March 2024. |
| Bucheon C | Kim Sang-hee | Democratic Party | |
| Bucheon D | Seo Young-seok | ~~Democratic Party~~ ~~Independent~~ Democratic Party | Asked by the Democratic Supreme Council to remove herself from the Party on 8 June 2021 for violating the Anti-Corruption and Civil Rights Commission reports. Accepted the council's ruling. Acquitted of the charges and returned to the Democratic Party on 25 August 2021. |
| Gwangmyeong A | Lim O-kyeong | Democratic Party | |
| Gwangmyeong B | Yang Gi-dae | Democratic Party | |
| Pyeongtaek A | Hong Gi-won | Democratic Party | |
| Pyeongtaek B | Yoo Ui-dong | People Power | |
| Ansan Sangnok A | Jeon Hae-cheol | Democratic Party | |
| Ansan Sangnok B | Kim Cheol-min | Democratic Party | |
| Ansan Danwon A | Goh Young-in | Democratic Party | |
| Ansan Danwon B | Kim Nam-kook | ~~Democratic Party~~; ~~Independent~~; Democratic Alliance | Left Democratic 14 May 2023 after controversies around using a gay dating app and selling cryptocurrencies while in parliament session. Joined Democratic Alliance 20 March 2024. |
| Goyang A | Sim Sang-jung | Green-Justice | |
| Goyang B | Han Jun-ho | Democratic Party | |
| Goyang C | Hong Jung-min | ~~Democratic Party~~; Democratic Alliance | Joined Democratic Alliance 20 March 2024. |
| Goyang D | Lee Yong-woo | Democratic Party | |
| Namyangju A | Cho Eung-cheon | ~~Democratic Party~~; ~~Independent~~; New Reform | Left Democratic on 10 January 2024, citing ideological differences with leader Lee Jae-myung. Joined New Reform on 9 February 2024. |
| Namyangju B | Kim Han-jeong | Democratic Party | Asked by the Democratic Supreme Council to remove himself from the Party on 8 June 2021 for violating the Anti-Corruption and Civil Rights Commission reports. Protesting the council's ruling. Acquitted 13 September 2021 |
| Namyangju C | Kim Yong-min | Democratic Party | |
| Siheung A | Moon Jeong-bok | Democratic Party | |
| Siheung B | Cho Jeong-sik | Democratic Party | |
| Gunpo | Lee Hak-young | Democratic Party | |
| Yongin A | ~~Jeong Chan-min~~ | ~~People Power~~ | Asked by the Party leader Lee Jun-seok to remove himself from the Party on 24 August 2021 for violating the Anti-Corruption and Civil Rights Commission reports. Removed from Parliament on 18 August 2023 on charges of bribery. |
| Yongin B | Kim Min-gi | Democratic Party | |
| Yongin C | Jung Choun-sook | Democratic Party | |
| Yongin D | Lee Tahney | Democratic Party | |
| Paju A | Yoon Hu-deok | Democratic Party | |
| Paju B | Park Jeong | Democratic Party | |
| Gimpo A | Kim Ju-young | ~~Democratic Party~~; ~~Independent~~; Democratic Party | Asked by the Democratic Supreme Council to remove himself from the Party on 8 June 2021 for violating the Anti-Corruption and Civil Rights Commission reports. Accepted the council's ruling. Readmitted 27 October 2021 |
| Gimpo B | Park Sang-hyuk | Democratic Party | |
| Hwaseong A | Song Ok-ju | Democratic Party | |
| Hwaseong B | Lee Won-uk | ~~Democratic Party~~; ~~Independent~~; New Reform | Left Democratic on 10 January 2024, citing ideological differences with leader Lee Jae-myung. Joined New Reform on 9 February 2024. |
| Hwaseong C | Kwon Chil-seung | Democratic Party | |
| Gwangju A | So Byeong-hoon | Democratic Party | |
| Gwangju B | ~~Lim Jong-seong~~ | ~~Democratic Party~~; ~~Independent~~ | Asked by the Democratic Supreme Council to remove himself from the Party on 8 June 2021 for violating the Anti-Corruption and Civil Rights Commission reports. Accepted the council's ruling. Removed from office by court order on 8 February 2024. |
| Guri | Yun Ho-jung | Democratic Party | |
| Osan | An Min-seok | Democratic Party | |
| Hanam | Choi Jong-yoon | Democratic Party | |
| Icheon | Song Seok-jun | People Power | |
| Anseong | ~~Lee Kyu-min~~ | ~~Democratic Party~~ | Election invalid due to election crimes on 30 September 2021. Violated the Public Official Election Act by maliciously spreading false information about Kim Hak-yong, the opposing candidate in the 2020 Parliamentary election. |
| Anseong | Kim Hak-young | People Power | Elected March 9, 2022 |
| Yangju | Jeong Seong-ho | Democratic Party | |
| Uiwang–Gwacheon | Lee So-young | Democratic Party | |
| Dongducheon–Yeoncheon | Kim Seong-won | People Power | |
| Pocheon–Gapyeong | Choi Chun-sik | People Power | Asked by the Party leader Lee Jun-seok to remove himself from the Party on 24 August 2021 for violating the Anti-Corruption and Civil Rights Commission reports. Party withdrew their request on 25 November 2021. |
| Yeoju–Yangpyeong | ~~Kim Seon-kyo~~ | ~~People Power~~ | Removed from parliament on 18 March 2023 for accountant's misfiling of election expenses. |

==== Gangwon ====
| Constituency | Member | Party | Notes |
|---|---|---|---|
| Chuncheon–Cheorwon–Hwacheon–Yanggu A | Heo Young | Democratic Party | |
| Chuncheon–Cheorwon–Hwacheon–Yanggu B | Han Gi-ho | People Power | |
| Wonju A | ~~Lee Kwang-jae~~ | ~~Democratic Party~~ | Resigned to Run for Gangwon Governor in 2022. |
| Wonju A | Park Jeongha | People Power | Elected 1 June 2022 |
| Wonju B | Song Ki-hun | Democratic Party | |
| Gangneung | Kwon Seong-dong | ~~Independent~~; People Power | Rejoined the People Power on 17 September 2020. |
| Donghae–Taebaek–Samcheok–Jeongseon | Lee Cheol-gyu | People Power | Asked by the Party leader Lee Jun-seok to remove himself from the Party on 24 August 2021 for violating the Anti-Corruption and Civil Rights Commission reports. |
| Hongcheon–Hoengseong–Yeongwol–Pyeongchang | Yoo Sang-beom | People Power | |
| Sokcho–Goseong–Yangyang–Inje | Lee Yang-soo | People Power | |

==== North Chungcheong ====
| Constituency | Member | Party | Notes |
|---|---|---|---|
| Cheongju Sangdang | ~~Jeong Jeong-soon~~ | ~~Democratic Party~~ | Imprisoned for campaign finance violations on 3 November 2020. Removed from office on 27 August 2021. |
| Cheongju Sangdang | Chung Woo-taik | People Power | Elected March 9, 2022 |
| Cheongju Seowon | Lee Jang-seop | Democratic Party | |
| Cheongju Heungdeok | Doh Jong-hwan | Democratic Party | |
| Cheongju Cheongwon | Byeon Jae-il | Democratic Party | |
| Chungju | Lee Jong-bae | People Power | |
| Jecheon–Danyang | Eom Tae-young | People Power | |
| Boeun–Okcheon–Yeongdong–Goesan | Park Duk-hyum | ~~People Power~~; ~~Independent~~; People Power | Left People Power on 24 September 2020 over corruption allegations. Readmitted to People Power 30 Dec 2021. |
| Jeungpyeong–Jincheon–Eumseong | Lim Ho-seon | Democratic Party | |

==== South Chungcheong ====
| Constituency | Member | Party | Notes |
|---|---|---|---|
| Cheonan A | Moon Jin-seok | ~~Democratic Party~~; ~~Independent~~; Democratic Party | Asked by the Democratic Supreme Council to remove himself from the Party on 8 June 2021 for violating the Anti-Corruption and Civil Rights Commission reports. Accepted the council's ruling. Cleared of all charges and returned to Democratic as of February 2022. |
| Cheonan B | Park Wan-ju | ~~Democratic Party~~; Independent | Expelled from Democratic on 12 May 2022 over sexual misconduct. |
| Cheonan C | Lee Jeong-mun | Democratic Party | |
| Gongju–Buyeo–Cheongyang | Chung Jin-suk | People Power | |
| Boryeong–Seocheon | ~~Kim Tae-heum~~ | ~~People Power~~ | Resigned to Run for South Chungcheong Governor in 2022. |
| Boryeong–Seocheon | Jang Dong-hyeok | People Power | Elected 1 June 2022 |
| Asan A | Lee Myeong-su | People Power | |
| Asan B | Kang Hun-sik | Democratic Party | |
| Seosan–Taean | Seong Il-jong | People Power | |
| Nonsan–Gyeryong–Geumsan | Kim Jong-min | ~~Democratic Party~~; ~~Independent~~; ~~New Future~~; ~~New Reform~~; New Future | Left Democratic on 10 January 2024, citing ideological differences with leader Lee Jae-myung. Created New Future 4 January 2024. Party merged with New Reform on 9 February 2024. Left New Reform on 20 February 2024, citing ideological differences with leader Lee Jun-seok; returned to New Future. |
| Dangjin | Eo Gi-gu | Democratic Party | |
| Hongseong–Yesan | Hong Mun-pyo | People Power | |

==== North Jeolla ====
| Constituency | Member | Party | Notes |
|---|---|---|---|
| Jeonju A | Kim Yoon-deok | Democratic Party | |
| Jeonju B | ~~Lee Sang-jik~~ | ~~Democratic Party~~; ~~Independent~~ | Left Democratic on 12 October 2020 on charges of purposely bankrupting his Eastar Jet company. Arrested on 28 April 2021. Removed by the Supreme Court on 12 May 2022. |
| Jeonju B | Kang Sung-hee | Progressive Party | Elected 5 April 2023 |
| Jeonju C | Kim Seong-ju | Democratic Party | |
| Gunsan | Shin Young-dae | Democratic Party | |
| Iksan A | Kim Su-heung | ~~Democratic Party~~; ~~Independent~~; Democratic Party | Asked by the Democratic Supreme Council to remove himself from the Party on 8 June 2021 for violating the Anti-Corruption and Civil Rights Commission reports. Accepted the council's ruling. Found innocent in July 2021. |
| Iksan B | Han Byeong-do | Democratic Party | |
| Jeongeup–Gochang | Yoon Jun-byeong | Democratic Party | |
| Namwon–Imsil–Sunchang | Lee Yong-ho | ~~Independent~~; People Power | Currently in talks to rejoin the Democratic, as of 4 June 2021. Joined People Power 9 December 2021. |
| Gimje–Buan | Lee Won-taek | Democratic Party | |
| Wanju–Jinan–Muju–Jangsu | Ahn Ho-young | Democratic Party | |

==== South Jeolla ====
| Constituency | Member | Party | Notes |
|---|---|---|---|
| Mokpo | Kim Won-i | Democratic Party | |
| Yeosu A | Jo Cheol-hyeok | Democratic Party | |
| Yeosu B | Kim Hoi-jae | Democratic Party | Asked by the Democratic Supreme Council to remove himself from the Party on 8 June 2021 for violating the Anti-Corruption and Civil Rights Commission reports. Protesting the council's ruling. Found not guilty. |
| Suncheon–Gwangyang–Gokseong–Gurye A | So Byeong-cheol | Democratic Party | |
| Suncheon–Gwangyang–Gokseong–Gurye B | Seo Dong-yong | Democratic Party | |
| Naju–Hwasun | Shin Jeong-hun | Democratic Party | |
| Damyang–Hampyeong–Yeonggwang–Jangseong | Lee Gae-ho | Democratic Party | |
| Goheung–Boseong–Jangheung–Gangjin | Kim Seung-nam | Democratic Party | |
| Haenam–Wando–Jindo | Yun Jae-kap | Democratic Party | Asked by the Democratic Supreme Council to remove himself from the Party on 8 June 2021 for violating the Anti-Corruption and Civil Rights Commission reports. Accepted the council's ruling. Yoon was cleared of all charges, but his wife was prosecuted under the violation of the Farmland Law. Returned to Democratic on 10 August 2021. |
| Yeongam–Muan–Sinan | Seo Sam-seok | Democratic Party | |

==== North Gyeongsang ====
| Constituency | Member | Party | Notes |
|---|---|---|---|
| Pohang Buk | Kim Jeong-jae | People Power | |
| Pohang Nam–Ulleung | Kim Byong-wook | ~~People Power~~; ~~Independent~~; People Power | Left People Power on 7 January 2021 over suspicion of sexual assault. Reinstated to the Party 21 May 2021. |
| Gyeongju | Kim Seok-ki | People Power | |
| Gimcheon | Song Eon-seok | ~~People Power~~; ~~Independent~~; People Power | Expelled from People Power on 12 April 2021 over physical altercation with party officials. Reinstated late 2021. |
| Andong–Yecheon | Kim Hyeong-dong | People Power | |
| Gyeongsan | Yoon Du-hyeon | People Power | |
| Gumi A | Gu Ja-geun | People Power | |
| Gumi B | Kim Young-sik | People Power | |
| Sangju–Mungyeong | Lim I-ja | People Power | |
| Yeongcheon–Cheongdo | Lee Man-hee | People Power | |
| Gunwi–Uiseong–Cheongsong–Yeongdeok | Kim Hee-gook | People Power | |
| Yeongju–Yeongyang–Bonghwa–Uljin | Park Hyeong-su | People Power | |
| Goryeong–Seongju–Chilgok | Jeong Hee-yong | People Power | |

==== South Gyeongsang ====
| Constituency | Member | Party | Notes |
|---|---|---|---|
| Changwon Uichang | ~~Park Wan-soo~~ | ~~People Power~~ | Resigned to run for Gyeongnam Governor in 2022. |
| Changwon Uichang | Kim Yeong-seon | People Power | Elected 1 June 2022 |
| Changwon Seongsan | Kang Ki-youn | People Power | Asked by the Party leader Lee Jun-seok to remove himself from the Party on 24 August 2021 for violating the Anti-Corruption and Civil Rights Commission reports. |
| Changwon Masanhappo | Choi Hyeong-du | People Power | |
| Changwon Masanhoewon | Yoon Han-hong | People Power | |
| Changwon Jinhae | Lee Dal-gon | People Power | |
| Jinju A | Park Dae-chul | People Power | |
| Jinju B | Kang Min-gook | People Power | |
| Tongyeong–Goseong | Jeong Jeom-sik | People Power | |
| Sacheon–Namhae–Hadong | Ha Young-je | ~~People Power~~; Independent | Evicted from People Power 30 March 2023 for bribes of US$53,600. |
| Gimhae A | Min Hong-cheol | Democratic Party | |
| Gimhae B | Kim Jeong-ho | Democratic Party | |
| Miryang–Uiryeong–Haman–Changnyeong | Cho Hae-jin | People Power | |
| Geoje | Seo Il-jun | People Power | |
| Yangsan A | Yoon Young-seok | People Power | |
| Yangsan B | Kim Doo-kwan | Democratic Party | |
| Sancheong–Hamyang–Geochang–Hapcheon | Kim Tae-ho | ~~Independent~~; People Power | Rejoined the People Power on 7 January 2021 |

==== Jeju ====
| Constituency | Member | Party | Notes |
|---|---|---|---|
| Jeju A | Song Jae-ho | ~~Democratic Party~~; Democratic Alliance | |
| Jeju B | ~~Oh Young-hun~~ | ~~Democratic Party~~ | Asked by the Democratic Supreme Council to remove himself from the Party on 8 June 2021 for violating the Anti-Corruption and Civil Rights Commission reports. Protesting the council's ruling. Violation of the Farmland Act (not charged). Returned to Democratic. Resigned to Run for Jeju Governor in 2022. |
| Jeju B | Kim Han-gyu | Democratic Party | Elected 1 June 2022. |
| Seogwipo | Wi Seong-gon | Democratic Party | |

=== Proportional representation ===
==== Future Korea ====
| List number | Member | Party | Notes |
|---|---|---|---|
| 1 | Youn Ju-kyoung | ~~Future Korea~~; People Power | |
| 2 | Youn Chang-hyeon | ~~Future Korea~~; People Power | |
| 3 | Han Mu-gyeong | ~~Future Korea~~; People Power | Asked by the Party leader Lee Jun-seok to remove herself from the Party on 24 August 2021 for violating the Anti-Corruption and Civil Rights Commission reports. All chargest dropped December 2021. |
| 4 | Lee Jong-seong | ~~Future Korea~~; ~~People Power~~; People Future | Left People Power and joined People's Future on 17 March 2024. |
| 5 | Jo Su-jin | ~~Future Korea~~; People Power | |
| ~~6~~ | ~~Cho Tae-yong~~ | ~~Future Korea~~; People Power | Resigned 17 May 2022 to become Ambassador to the United States |
| 7 | Jeong Kyoung-hee | ~~Future Korea~~; ~~People Power~~; People Future | Left People Power and joined People's Future on 17 March 2024. |
| ~~8~~ | ~~Shin Won-sik~~ | ~~Future Korea~~; ~~People Power~~ | Resigned 7 October 2023 to become 49th Minister of National Defense. |
| 9 | Jo Myeong-hee | ~~Future Korea~~; People Power | |
| 10 | Park Dae-su | ~~Future Korea~~; People Power | |
| 11 | Kim Ye-ji | ~~Future Korea~~; ~~People Power~~; People Future | Left People Power and joined People's Future on 17 March 2024. |
| 12 | Ji Seong-ho | ~~Future Korea~~; ~~People Power~~; People Future | Left People Power and joined People's Future on 17 March 2024. |
| ~~13~~ | ~~Lee Young~~ | ~~Future Korea~~; ~~People Power~~ | Resigned 1 March 2023 to become Minister of SMEs and Startups. |
| 14 | Choi Seung-jae | ~~Future Korea~~; People Power | |
| 15 | Jeon Ju-hye | ~~Future Korea~~; People Power | |
| 16 | Chung Woon-chun | ~~Future Korea~~; People Power | |
| 17 | Seo Jeong-suk | ~~Future Korea~~; People Power | |
| 18 | Lee Yong | ~~Future Korea~~; People Power | |
| ~~19~~ | ~~Heo Eun-ah~~ | ~~Future Korea~~; ~~People Power~~ | Lost seat on 3 January 2024 after leaving the Party to join Lee Jun-seok's new party |
| 20 | Roh Yong-ho | ~~People Power~~; People Future | Replaced #6 after resignation on 17 March 2022. Left People Power and joined People's Future on 17 March 2024. |
| 21 | Choi Young-hui | ~~People Power~~; People Future | Replaced #13 after resignation on 2 March 2023. |
| 22 | Woo Shin-ku | ~~People Power~~; People Future | Replaced #8 after resignation on 2 November 2023. Left People Power and joined People's Future on 17 March 2024. |
| 23 | Kim Eun-hui | ~~People Power~~; People Future | Replaced #19 after resignation on 3 January 2024. Left People Power and joined People's Future on 17 March 2024. |

==== Platform ====
| List number | Member | Party | Notes |
|---|---|---|---|
| 1 | Shin Hyeon-young | ~~Platform~~; Democratic Party | |
| 2 | Kim Kyeong-man | ~~Platform~~; ~~Democratic Party~~; Democratic Alliance | Left Democratic on 17 March 2024 and joined Democratic Alliance. |
| 3 | Kwon In-suk | ~~Platform~~; ~~Democratic Party~~; Democratic Alliance | Left Democratic on 17 March 2024 and joined Democratic Alliance. |
| 4 | Lee Dong-ju | ~~Platform~~; ~~Democratic Party~~; Democratic Alliance | Left Democratic on 17 March 2024 and joined Democratic Alliance. |
| 5 | Yong Hye-in | ~~Platform~~; ~~Basic Income~~; ~~New Progressive Alliance~~; ~~Democratic Alliance~~; Basic Income | Expelled from Platform and returned to Basic Income on 12 May 2020. Temporarily substituted while on maternity leave as of 9 May 2021. Return June 5, 2021; Joined Democratic Alliance on 9 February 2024. Expelled from Democratic Alliance on 27 April 2024 and return to Basic Income. |
| 6 | Cho Jung-hoon | ~~Platform~~; ~~Period Transition~~; People Power | Expelled from Platform and returned to Period Transition on 12 May 2020. Merged Period Transition into People Power on 9 November 2023. |
| 7 | Yoon Mee-hyang | ~~Platform~~; ~~Democratic Party~~; Independent | Expelled from Democratic on 8 June 2021 following a controversy related to property issues. |
| 8 | Jeong Pil-mo | ~~Platform~~; Democratic Party | |
| 9 | Yang Yiwon-young | ~~Platform~~; ~~Democratic Party~~; ~~Independent~~; ~~Democratic Party~~; Democratic Alliance | Expelled from Democratic on 8 June 2021 following a controversy of breaching the Agricultural Land Act. Reinstated October 2021 after being found not guilty. Left Democratic on 17 March 2024 and Democratic Alliance. |
| 10 | Yoo Jeong-ju | ~~Platform~~; Democratic Party | |
| 11 | Choi Hye-young | ~~Platform~~; Democratic Party | |
| 12 | Kim Byung-ju | ~~Platform~~; Democratic Party | |
| 13 | Lee Soo-jin | ~~Platform~~; Democratic Party | |
| 14 | Kim Hong-geol | ~~Platform~~; Democratic Party | Expelled from Democratic on 18 September 2020 on charges of underreporting his wealth and real estate investments. Readmitted on 7 July 2023 after being found not guilty. |
| 15 | Yang Jeong-suk | ~~Platform~~; ~~Democratic Party~~; New Reform | Expelled from Platform on 29 April 2020 on charges of dodging taxes and using relative's names without consent for property assets. Joined New Reform on 14 February 2024. |
| 16 | Jeon Yong-gi | ~~Platform~~; Democratic Party | |
| 17 | Yang Kyeong-suk | ~~Platform~~; Democratic Party | |

==== Justice ====
| List number | Member | Party | Notes |
|---|---|---|---|
| ~~1~~ | ~~Ryu Ho-jeong~~ | ~~Justice~~ | Loss of seat due to leaving the Party. |
| 2 | Jang Hye-young | Green-Justice | |
| 3 | Kang Eun-mi | Green-Justice | |
| 4 | Bae Jin-gyo | Green-Justice | |
| ~~5~~ | ~~Lee Eun-ju~~ | ~~Justice~~ | Resigned 25 January 2024 after election was invalidated due to improper campaigning. |
| 8 | Yang Gyeong-gyu | Green-Justice | Took seat after the resignation of #1. |
| 9 | Jasmine Lee | Green-Justice | Took seat after the resignation of #5. |

==== People Party ====
| List number | Member | Party | Notes |
|---|---|---|---|
| 1 | Choi Yeon-suk | ~~People Party~~; People Power | Elected under People Party. Parties merged on 18 April 2022. |
| 2 | Lee Tae-gyu | ~~People Party~~; People Power | Elected under People Party. Parties merged on 18 April 2022. |
| ~~3~~ | ~~Kwon Eun-hee~~ | ~~People Party~~; ~~People Power~~ | Elected under People Party. Party merged with People Power on 18 April 2022. Refused the merger decision. Acted as an independent. Accepted merger in May 2022. Lost seat 30 January 2024 after leaving the Party. |
| 4 | Kim Geun-tae | ~~People Power~~; People Future | Replaced #4 after resignation on 30 January 2024. Left People Power and joined People's Future on 17 March 2024. |

==== Open Democratic ====
| List number | Member | Party | Notes |
|---|---|---|---|
| ~~1~~ | ~~Kim Jinai~~ | ~~Open Democratic Party~~ | Resigned 24 March 2021 |
| ~~2~~ | ~~Choe Kang-wook~~ | ~~Open Democratic Party~~; ~~Democratic Party~~ | Elected from Open Democratic Party. Merged into Democratic. Suspended on 20 June 2022 for 6 months for making sexually-suggestive comment during a Party meeting. Expelled from Parliament 18 September 2023 for falsifying academic background. |
| 3 | Kang Min-jeong | ~~Open Democratic Party~~; ~~Democratic Party~~; Democratic Alliance | Elected from Open Democratic Party. Merged into Democratic. Left Democratic on 17 March 2024 and joined Democratic Alliance. |
| 4 | Kim Eui-kyeom | ~~Open Democratic Party~~; ~~Democratic Party~~; Democratic Alliance | Took seat after the resignation of #1. Under investigation for suspicious real estate deals as presidential spokesperson Elected from Open Democratic Party. Merged into Democratic. Left Democratic on 17 March 2024 and joined Democratic Alliance. |
| 5 | Heo Suk-jeong | Democratic Party | Took seat after the resignation of #2. |

== Notes ==
| Preceded by 2016–20 | Members of the National Assembly | Succeeded by 2024–28 |
