= List of physically disabled politicians =

List of world politicians who had or have a physical disability

The following is a list of politicians who hold or held office while having a physical disability.

== Afghanistan ==
- Mohammed Omar, Taliban leader and former head of state (lost one eye due to a shrapnel injury)

== Algeria ==
- Abdelaziz Bouteflika, former President of Algeria (wheelchair user)

== Argentina ==
- Gabriela Michetti, former vice president (wheelchair user)
- Daniel Scioli, former vice president and former governor of Buenos Aires Province (lost his right arm in an accident in 1989)
- Jorge Triaca Jr., former Minister of Labour (wheelchair user)

== Armenia ==
- Seyran Ohanyan, former Defence Minister of Armenia (one leg amputated after being wounded during the First Nagorno-Karabakh War)
- Zaruhi Batoyan, Minister of Social Affairs and Labour (wheelchair user)
- Artak Zeynalyan, Minister of Justice of Armenia (leg amputee)

== Australia ==
Federal

- Graham Edwards, member of the House of Representatives (lost both legs during the Vietnam War)
- John Hyde, member of the House of Representatives (lost an arm in a farming accident)
- George Maxwell, member of the House of Representatives (deteriorating eyesight, eventually went blind)
- Gregor McGregor, senator for South Australia (deteriorating eyesight, eventually went blind)
- Alby Schultz, member of the House of Representatives (blind in one eye after an accident with hydrochloric acid)
- Jordon Steele-John, senator for Western Australia (cerebral palsy, wheelchair user)

State

- Denise Allen, member of the Victorian Legislative Assembly (muscular atrophy)
- Les Craig, member of the WA Legislative Council (lost a leg during World War I)
- Henry Curran, member of the WA Legislative Assembly (lost a leg in a traffic accident)
- Roberts Dunstan, member of the Victorian Legislative Assembly (lost a leg during World War II)
- Frank Guthrie, member of the WA Legislative Assembly (lost a leg during World War I)
- Cecil Hincks, member of the South Australian House of Assembly (lost a leg during World War I)
- David Hunter, member of the NSW Legislative Assembly (went blind as a child after contracting meningitis)
- Mathieson Jacoby, member of the WA Legislative Assembly (blind in one eye after dynamiting accident)
- Peter Lalor, member of the Victorian Legislative Assembly (lost an arm in the Eureka Rebellion)
- Iven Manning, member of the WA Legislative Assembly (lost an arm during World War II)
- Frank Marriott, member of the Tasmanian House of Assembly (lost sight during World War I)
- Hugh Mosman, member of the Queensland Legislative Council (lost arm in a dynamiting accident)
- Batong Pham, member of the WA Legislative Council (uses a wheelchair after experiencing a brain aneurysm)
- Rob Pyne, member of the Queensland Legislative Assembly (quadriplegic, wheelchair user)
- Liesl Tesch, member of the New South Wales Legislative Assembly (paraplegic, wheelchair user)
- Kelly Vincent, member of the South Australian Legislative Council (cerebral palsy, wheelchair user)
- William Willmott, member of the WA Legislative Assembly (lost a leg during World War I)

== Austria ==
- Ferdinand I, Emperor of Austria (1835–48) (severe epilepsy from childhood, hydrocephalic)

== Brazil ==
Name	Party (most recent)	Office(s)	Notes
Mara Gabrilli	Social Democratic Party	Senator for São Paulo (2019–current) Federal Deputy for São Paulo (2011–2019)	Tetraplegic due to a car accident
Felipe Rigoni	Brazil Union	Federal Deputy for Espírito Santo (2019–2022)	Blind
Golbery do Couto e Silva	National Renewal Alliance	Chief of Staff of the Presidency (1974–1981)	Blind in one eye
Luiz Inácio Lula da Silva	Workers' Party	President of Brazil (2003–2011), (2023–current) Federal Deputy for São Paulo (1989–1991), (1987–1989)	Lost his left pinky finger from a machine accident
Walter Tosta	Liberal Party	Federal Deputy for Minas Gerais (2011–2015) State Deputy of Minas Gerais (2007–2011)	Paraplegic

== Cambodia ==
- Ta Mok, Khmer Rouge leader (amputated lower leg)
- Hun Sen, Prime minister (blind in one eye due to a war wound)

== Canada ==
- Lucien Bouchard, former Ambassador to France, leader of the Bloc Québécois and Premier of Quebec (amputee due to necrotizing fasciitis)
- Buckley Belanger, Member of the Legislative Assembly of Saskatchewan for Athabasca (visually impaired in left eye)
- Stephanie Cadieux, Member of the Legislative Assembly of British Columbia (paraplegic)
- Diane Finley, Minister of Human Resources and Skills Development (visually impaired due to Graves' disease)
- Steven Fletcher, Federal Minister of State for Democratic Reform and for Transport; Leader of the provincial Manitoba Party (first quadriplegic MP)
- Kent Hehr, Member of the Legislative Assembly of Alberta for Calgary-Buffalo; Member of Parliament for Calgary Centre (quadriplegic after being shot as a bystander in a drive-by shooting)
- Marlene Jennings, Member of Parliament for Notre-Dame-de-Grâce—Lachine (partially blind due to detached retinas and cataracts)
- Joseph McNamara, Member of Provincial Parliament for Riverdale (amputee; lost his right arm while a soldier in Vimy, France in World War I)
- Megan Patterson, Member of the Legislative Assembly of Saskatchewan for Moose Jaw Wakamow (tracheostomy due to injuries sustained in a car crash)
- Manon Perreault, Member of Parliament for Montcalm (paraplegic)
- Pierre Sévigny, former Member of Parliament and Associate Minister of National Defence (amputee)
- Michelle Stilwell, Member of the Legislative Assembly of British Columbia (quadriplegic)
- Sam Sullivan, former mayor of Vancouver (quadriplegic with limited use of his extremities)
- Carla Qualtrough, Member of Parliament for Delta and Minister of Public Services and Procurement and Accessibility (visually impaired since birth)
- Sarah Jama, Member of the Ontario Provincial Parliament for Hamilton Central (wheelchair user born with cerebral palsy).

== Colombia ==
- Jairo Clopatofsky, Representative of the constituency of Bogotá to the Chamber of Representatives of Colombia (1991–1994), Senator of Colombia (1994–1998, 2002–2004, 2005–2010), General Director of the Administrative Department of Sport, Recreation, Physical Activity and the Use of Free Time, Coldeportes (2010–2012). Paraplegic from 1982 to 2005 due to a car accident. Partially able to walk since 2005 thanks to stem cell treatment.
- Viviane Morales Hoyos, Representative of the constituency of Bogotá to the Chamber of Representatives of Colombia (1991–1994, 1994–1998), Senator of Colombia (1998–2002), Attorney General of Colombia (2010–2012). Missing one eye due to an infection.
- Antonio Navarro Wolff, Collegiate president of the Constituent Assembly of Colombia writing the Colombian Constitution of 1991, Mayor of the city of Pasto (1995–1997), Representative of the constituency of Bogotá to the Chamber of Representatives of Colombia (1998–2002), Governor of Nariño (2008–2011), General Secretary of the mayor of Bogotá, Senator of Colombia (2002–2006, 2014–2018). Amputated lower leg and speech disorder secondary to partial tongue paralysis due to an assassination attempt.
- Elsa Noguera, Mayor of Barranquilla (2012–2015), Minister of Housing, City and Territory (2016–2017), Governor of Atlantico. Mobility problems due to osteogenesis imperfecta.

== Czech Republic ==
- Jaromír of Bohemia, Duke of Bohemia (blinded by Oldřich of Bohemia after being dethroned in 1012, ruled again from 1033 to 1034)
- Wenceslaus I of Bohemia, King of Bohemia (half-blind; permanently injured his left eye in a hunting accident)
- John of Bohemia, King of Bohemia and Poland (blind)
- Jan Žižka, Czech general and Hussite leader, follower of Jan Hus; took part in the civil wars in Bohemia in the reign of Wenceslaus IV (blind)
- Jan Syrový, Czech general, prime minister of Czechoslovakia during the Munich Crisis (half-blind; lost his right eye during the Battle of Zborov)
- Miloš Zeman, President of the Czech Republic, wheelchair user as a result of complications caused by diabetes and neuropathy.

== Dominican Republic ==
- Joaquín Balaguer, former president (1960–1962, 1966–1978, and 1986–1996) (blind on his last term due to glaucoma)

== Ecuador ==
- Lenín Moreno, former President (2017–2021) and former Vice President (2007–2013) (paraplegic)

== Estonia ==
- Edgar Savisaar, former mayor of Tallinn and former acting Prime Minister (had a leg amputated due to necrotizing fasciitis)

== Fiji ==
- Iliesa Delana, member of Parliament and Assistant Minister for Youth and Sports (since 2014); Paralympic gold medallist (leg amputee due to an accident as a child)

== France ==
- Georges Couthon, one of the leaders of the French Revolution, President of the National Convention (paraplegic)
- Louis XVIII, King of France (paralysed by gout in his final years)
- Antoine Pinay, Prime Minister of France (paralyzed right arm due to a World War I injury)
- Jean-Marie Le Pen, Member of the European Parliament and three-time presidential candidate (blind in his left eye)
- Damien Abad, deputee and minister (arthrogryposis)

== Gabon ==
- Ali Bongo Ondimba, President of Gabon, paralyzed because of a stroke

== Germany ==
- Malu Dreyer, former Minister-President of Rhineland-Palatinate (has multiple sclerosis)
- George V, last King of Hanover (blind by age 14)
- Joseph Goebbels, Reich Minister of Propaganda and ultimately Chancellor of Germany after Hitler (had deformed foot causing limp)
- Heike Heubach, Member of Bundestag since 2024 (First deaf member of the Bundestag)
- Otto Graf Lambsdorff, Member of Bundestag 1972–1998, minister of economy 1977–1984 (leg amputee)
- Wolfgang Schäuble, former President of the Bundestag, former minister of finance and the interior and former CDU party chairman (wheelchair user since 1990 assassination attempt)
- Kurt Schumacher, Member of Bundestag 1949–1952, head of SPD (double amputee: right arm and left leg)
- Wilhelm II, last Kaiser and King of Prussia (Had a withered left arm about 15 cm shorter than his right as a result of Erb's palsy)

== Gibraltar ==
- Peter Caruana, Member of the Gibraltar Parliament 1991–2013, 5th Chief Minister of Gibraltar 1996–2011 (blind in one eye)

== Hungary ==
- Béla II, King of Hungary (1131–1141) (blinded by his father's political opponents in 1113)
- Ferenc Hirt, Member of Parliament for Tamási (2006–2018) (wheelchair user since 1988 due to a car accident)
- Katalin Szili, Speaker of the National Assembly of Hungary (lost hand from undisposed grenade explosion at age 12)
- Vilmos Kátai-Németh, Member of the National Assembly of Hungary and Minister of Social and Family Affairs (lost his vision due to an inherited retinal disease at age 16)

== India ==
- Jaipal Reddy (polio)
- Yamuna Prasad Shastri (blind)
- Sadhan Gupta (blind)
- Simon Britto Rodrigues (legs paralysis)
- Hari Dev Joshi (did not have one hand)

== Indonesia ==
- Abdurrahman Wahid, 4th president of Indonesia (lost his left eye and visually impaired on the right eye due to glaucoma)

== Iran ==
- Ali Khamenei, Supreme Leader of Iran (lost his right hand's function in an assassination attempt)

== Ireland ==
- Brian Crowley, former MEP for South (wheelchair-user since an accident aged 16)
- Senator Martin Conway (blind)
- Michael Davitt, Irish Republican Member of Parliament of the United Kingdom for Irish seats between 1882 and 1899, (lost right arm in an industrial accident aged 11)
- Seán Connick, former TD for Wexford (wheelchair user)
- Mark Ward, Sinn Féin TD for Dublin Mid-West (multiple sclerosis)

== Israel ==
- Moshe Dayan, Defense Minister and Foreign Affairs Minister of Israel (lost his left eye in World War II)
- Karin Elharar, Minister of Energy and member of the Knesset (has sarcopenia, which causes a degenerative loss in skeletal muscle mass; wheelchair user)
- Ilan Gilon, member of the Knesset (paralyzed leg due to polio)
- Ya'akov Katz, member of the Knesset (injury sustained in the Yom Kippur War)
- Moshe Matalon, member of the Knesset (paraplegic due to injury sustained in an accident before the Yom Kippur War)
- Fateen Mulla, member of the Knesset (injury sustained during military service)
- Shirly Pinto, member of the Knesset (deaf)
- Zion Pinyan, member of the Knesset (polio)
- David Rotem, member of the Knesset (polio)
- Ofir Sofer, member of the Knesset (injury sustained during military service)

== Jamaica ==
- Floyd Morris, President of the Senate (blind)

== Japan ==
- Toshikazu Hori (堀利和), former member of the House of Councillors from 1989 to 1995 and 1998–2004 (legally blind)
- Eiko Kimura (木村英子), member of the House of Councillors from 2019 (a wheelchair user with tetraplegia and cerebral palsy due to falling with a baby walker as an infant)
- Yasuhiko Funago (舩後靖彦), member of the House of Councillors from 2019 (paralysed wheelchair user and lost ability to speak and write due to Amyotrophic lateral sclerosis)

== Kingdom of Jerusalem ==
- Baldwin IV of Jerusalem, King of Jerusalem (grave physical impairments as a result of his leprosy)

== Malaysia ==
- Ras Adiba Radzi, current member of senator (full-time wheelchair user, due to car accident on 15 November 1995, with her veterba was injured)
- Karpal Singh, member of parliament for Bukit Gelugor (a full-time wheelchair user, due to car accident, with neurological problems in his right arm)

== Mexico ==
- Miguel Barbosa, former President of the Senate (lost his right foot due to diabetes)
- Antonio López de Santa Anna, former President of the United Mexican States (lost his left leg in combat)
- Alonso Lujambio, former Secretary of Public Education and Senator (wheelchair user due to multiple myeloma; died after 24 days in office due to cancer)
- Álvaro Obregón, former President of the United Mexican States (lost his right arm in combat)
- Gilberto Rincón Gallardo, former President of the National Council to Prevent Discrimination (congenital physical anomaly)

== New Zealand ==
- Adam Adamson, Mayor of Invercargill (born without right hand)
- Leon Götz, MP 1949–1963 (lost right arm and eye during the First World War)
- Norman Jones, MP 1975–1987 (leg amputee; war wound during Second World War)
- John A. Lee, MP 1922–1943 (arm amputee; war wound during the First World War)
- Mojo Mathers, MP 2011–2017 (born deaf)
- Clutha McKenzie, MP 1921–1922 (blinded at Gallipoli during the First World War)
- Margaret Wilson, MP 1999–2008 (leg amputee)

== Norway ==
- Tove Linnea Brandvik, former Member of the Parliament of Norway (uses a wheelchair due to a neuromuscular disease)
- Guro Fjellanger, former Environment Minister (wheelchair user due to spina bifida)

== Philippines ==
- Apolinario Mabini, former prime minister and Foreign Affairs Secretary (paralysis due to polio)
- Grace Padaca, former governor of Isabela (paralysis due to polio)

== Poland ==
- Wojciech Jaruzelski, former Minister of Defence, Prime Minister, and President of Poland (snow blinded)
- Jan Filip Libicki, member of the Sejm and the Senate of Poland (wheelchair user)
- Janina Ochojska, member of the European Parliament (polio)
- Malgorzata Olejnik, member of the Sejm (wheelchair user; quadraplegic)
- Sławomir Piechota, member of the Sejm (wheelchair user)
- Marek Plura, member of the Sejm and later Member of the European Parliament (wheelchair user due to spinal muscular atrophy)

== Republic of Korea ==
- Dae-jung Kim (김대중) (1924–2009), former President of South Korea (limp following assassination attempt)
- Jie-won Park (박지원) (1942–), List of members of the National Assembly (South Korea), 2024–2028 (wears prosthetic eye after losing it)
- Jae-myung Lee (이재명) (1963–), former List of members of the National Assembly (South Korea), 2024–2028, current President of South Korea (injuries caused by youth labor accident)
- Mi-hwa Seo (서미화) (1967–), List of members of the National Assembly (South Korea), 2024–2028 (blind)
- Bo-yoon Choi (최보윤) (1978–), List of members of the National Assembly (South Korea), 2024–2028 (wheelchair user)
- Hye-young Choi (최혜영) (1979–), List of members of the National Assembly (South Korea), 2020–2024 (wheelchair user)
- Yea-ji Kim (김예지) (1980–), List of members of the National Assembly (South Korea), 2024–2028 (blind)
- Seong-ho Ji (지성호) (1982–), List of members of the National Assembly (South Korea), 2020–2024 (left leg and left arm amputated)
- So-hee Lee (이소희) (1986–), List of members of the National Assembly (South Korea), 2024–2028 (wheelchair user)

== Republic of Venice ==
- Enrico Dandolo (1107?–1205), 42nd Doge of Venice (blind)

== Roman Empire ==
- Appius Claudius Caecus, consul, praetor, and dictator of the Roman Republic fl. c. 312–279 BC (became blind in old age)
- Julius Caesar, dictator of the Roman Republic 49–44 BC (suffered from seizures)
- Claudius, 4th Roman emperor 41–54 (had problems walking)
- Justinian II "Rhinotmetos", Byzantine emperor 685–695, 705–711 (had his nose mutilated after his first deposition)
- Michael IV the Paphlagonian, Byzantine Emperor 1041-1042 (epileptic)
- Nikephoros Diogenes, Byzantine Emperor 1070–1071 (blinded by Alexios I Komnenos for plotting to overthrow him)
- Isaac II Angelos, Byzantine emperor 1185–1195, 1203–1204 (blinded by Alexios III Angelos to secure the latter's position as Emperor); because he was blind when he ascended the throne a second time, Isaac II was forced to co-rule with his son, Alexios IV Angelos
- Constantine Komnenos Angelos, sebastokrator of the Byzantine Empire c. 1185–? (blinded by Andronikos I Komnenos as a threat to the latter's position as Emperor); was made sebastokrator in the second reign of his brother, Isaac II Angelos

== Romania ==
- Armand Calinescu, Prime Minister of Romania in 1939, was one-eyed

== Russia ==
- Said Amirov, former mayor of Makhachkala (paralysed as a result of one of many assassination attempts)
- Vladimir Lenin, 1st Head of Government of the Russian Soviet Federative Socialist Republic (mute and bed-ridden after a series of strokes)
- Prince Grigory Potemkin, governor of Novorossiya (lost left eye during 1760s)
- Vasily II, the Grand Prince of Moscow (was blinded by his captors in 1446); regained power and reigned until his death in 1462
- Boris Yeltsin, the country's president (lost his left thumb and index finger, officially from a grenade blast)
- Natalia Poklonskaya, former prosecutor of Crimea and member of the State Duma (assaulted in the stairwell of her home in Yalta, leading to partial facial paralysis)

== San Marino ==
- Mirko Tomassoni, former Captain-Regent (paraplegic)

== Solomon Islands ==
- Martin Magga, Minister for Health (became ill and needed to use a wheelchair in 2009 while serving); resigned from the Cabinet but retained his seat in Parliament in the 2010 general election; served as MP, in a wheelchair, until his death in 2014

== Spain ==
- Pablo Echenique, member of the Congress of Deputies (wheelchair user due to spinal muscular atrophy)
- Charles II of Spain, ruled 1665–1700, described by historians Will and Ariel Durant as "short, lame, epileptic, senile and completely bald before 35, always on the verge of death but repeatedly baffling Christendom by continuing to live." An autopsy reported that his "heart was the size of a peppercorn; his lungs corroded; his intestines rotten and gangrenous; he had a single testicle, black as coal, and his head was full of water."

== Syria ==
- Alp Arslan al-Akhras, Seljuk sultan of Aleppo, known as the al-Akhras "the Mute," known for speech impediment and stammer.

== Sri Lanka ==
- Senarath Attanayake, Member of Uva Provincial Council; first elected representative with a disability in Sri Lanka; first person with a disability to hold ministerial portfolios (Minister of Agriculture, Irrigation, Land and Forestry) and to become an Acting Chief Minister of a Province; first person with a disability to become a lawyer in Sri Lanka (full-time wheelchair user due to polio infection at the age of two)
- Sugath Wasantha De Silva, Member of Parliament (National List) NPP. First blind and disabled person select the Parliament of Sri Lanka.

== Sweden ==
- David Lega, wheelchair user, congenital. MEP. Second vice minister of Christian Democrats.

== Thailand ==
- Rama IX, King of Thailand from 1946 to 2016 (blind in one eye for most of his reign following a road accident)

== Timurid Empire ==
- Timur, Amir of the Timurid Empire 1370–1405, injured by two arrow wounds to his right leg and arm, rendering them unusable, also known as "Timur the Lame," or Tamerlane.

== Turkey ==
- Deniz Baykal, former leader of the CHP, member of the house of councils. (paralyzed)

== Ukraine ==
- Hennadiy Kernes, Mayor of Kharkiv (wheelchair user since 2014 assassination attempt)
- Oleksandr Pabat, Kyiv City Council member and former presidential candidate (blind since 2013 because of an accident)
- Andriy Pyshnyi, MP from 2012 to 2014 and Governor of the National Bank of Ukraine since 2022 (almost completely without hearing)
- Yuriy Shukhevych, MP from 2014 to 2019 (blind since imprisonment in the 1970s)
- Valeriy Sushkevich, MP from 1998 to 2014 (wheelchair user since childhood)
- Oleksiy Zhuravko, MP from 2006 to 2012 and collaborator with Russia in 2022 (disabled since birth)
- Yana Zinkevych, MP since 2019 (wheelchair user since 2015 accident)

== United Kingdom ==
- Jack Ashley, MP from 1966 to 1992 (profoundly deaf from 1967)
- John Jacob Astor, 1st Baron Astor of Hever, MP 1922–45 (lost his right leg in battle in World War I in 1918)
- Anne Begg, MP from 1997 to 2015 (wheelchair user)
- David Blunkett, former Home Secretary (blind since birth)
- Robert Bourne, MP 1924–38 (lost sight of one eye in schooldays game of rounders and permanently damaged his hand at Suvla Bay during World War I)
- Gordon Brown, former Prime Minister (blind in one eye)
- Richard Austen Butler, Baron Butler of Saffron Walden, MP 1929–65, ultimately Foreign Secretary (left with a poorly functioning right hand after a childhood riding accident)
- Duncan Frederick Campbell, MP 1911–16 (lost left arm at the First Battle of Ypres in 1914)
- Jane Campbell, Baroness Campbell of Surbiton, disabled rights activist and member of the House of Lords (born with spinal muscular atrophy)
- Sir Winston Churchill, MP between 1901 and 1964, twice Prime Minister of the United Kingdom; in his second premiership (1951–55) became increasingly deaf (condition onset 1949) and a wheelchair user after series of strokes
- Jack Brunel Cohen, MP 1918–31 (lost both legs at the Third Battle of Ypres)
- Susan Cunliffe-Lister, Countess of Swinton and Baroness Masham of Ilton, politician (had several parts of her body paralysed following a car accident)
- Marsha de Cordova, MP since 2017 (blind from nystagmus)
- Steve Darling, MP since 2024 (blind)
- Terry Dicks, MP 1983-97 (had cerebral palsy)
- Pam Duncan-Glancy, MSP from 2021 (permanent wheelchair user)
- Reginald Essenhigh, MP 1931–35 (lost a leg in action in World War I in 1917)
- Stephen Flynn, MP from 2019 (walked with a crutch from childhood until a hip replacement, stemming from avascular necrosis)
- Michael Foot, MP 1950-55 and 1960–92, Leader of the Labour Party 1980-83 (walked with aid of a stick since car crash injuries in 1963 and was blinded in one eye by shingles in 1976)
- Ian Fraser, Baron Fraser of Lonsdale, MP several times between 1924 and 1958, then first life peer appointed to the House of Lords in 1958 (blinded in action during the First World War)
- George III, King of the United Kingdom (blind and deaf in his last ten years)
- Tanni Grey-Thompson, Baroness Grey-Thompson, disabled athlete and Member of the house of Lords (born with spina bifida)
- Robert Halfon, Education Select Committee Chair since 2017 (cerebral palsy and osteoarthritis)
- Aubrey Herbert, MP 1911–1923 (near blind from youth, becoming totally blind in his last year of life and service)
- Chris Holmes, Baron Holmes of Richmond, Conservative life peer in the House of Lords (blind)
- Davina Ingrams, 18th Baroness Darcy de Knayth, member of the House of Lords (paralyzed from the neck down following a car accident)
- Dan Irving, MP 1918–24 (lost a leg in an industrial accident as a railway worker)
- Colin Low, Baron Low of Dalston (born blind)
- Stephen Lloyd, MP from 2010 to 2015 and from 2017 to 2019 (deaf from age six)
- David Maclean, Baron Blencathra, MP (1983–2010) currently sitting to the house of Lords (since 1996 has multiple sclerosis)
- Iain Macleod, MP 1950–70, Chancellor of the Exchequer 1970, who permanently limped due to a World War II wound and later ankylosing spondylitis.
- Harold Macmillan, 1st Earl of Stockton, MP 1924–1929 and 1931–1964, Prime Minister 1957–63 (had slight limp and weak right hand, affecting handwriting, by a series of wounds in World War I)
- Cecil Manning, MP 1944–50 (lost right arm serving in World War I)
- Frederick Martin, MP 1922–24 (blinded during military training in 1915)
- George May, 1st Baron May, civil servant and member of the House of Lords from 1935 until his death in 1946 (blind in one eye)
- Paul Maynard, Parliamentary Under-Secretary of State for Department for Transport since 2019 (cerebral palsy)
- Herbert Morrison, Baron Morrison of Lambeth, successively Home and Foreign Secretary (blind in right eye from babyhood infection)
- Lord North, Prime Minister of United Kingdom 1770-82 and MP 1754-90 (lost eyesight 1780s)
- Jared O'Mara, MP from 2017 to 2019 (cerebral palsy, hemiparesis, and autism spectrum disorder)
- William Rees-Davies, MP 1953-83 (lost his right arm in action in World War II)
- Kevin Shinkwin, Baron Shinkwin, Conservative politician and member of the House of Lords (osteogenesis imperfecta, or "brittle bone syndrome")
- Charles Simmons, MP 1929-31 and 1945-59 (lost a leg at the Battle of Vimy Ridge in 1917)
- Gareth Thomas, MS since 2026 (wheelchair user)
- Marie Tidball, MP since 2024 (congenital disability which affects all her limbs)
- Arthur Wellesley, 1st Duke of Wellington, Prime Minister of the United Kingdom 1828-30 and 1834 (deaf in one ear from 1822)
- Edward Wood, 1st Earl of Halifax, MP 1910–25, Viceroy of India 1926–31, and Foreign Secretary of the United Kingdom 1938-40 (born without left hand)
- Richard Wood, Baron Holderness, MP 1950–79 (lost both legs in battle in the Middle East in World War II - son of Lord Halifax, above)
- George VI, King of the United Kingdom, had a stammer in the 1920s that he overcame with help from speech therapist Lionel Logue.
