= Kim Ye-ji =

- Hangul: 김예지
- RR: Gim Yeji
- MR: Kim Yeji

Kim Ye-ji or Kim Yeji (Korean: 김예지) is a Korean name. It may refer to:

- Kim Ye-ji (Politician) (born 1980), South Korean politician and pianist
- Kim Ye-ji (sport shooter) (born 1992), South Korean pistol shooter
- Kim Ye-ji (rower) (born 1994), South Korean rower
- Kim Ye-ji (actress) (born 1997), South Korean actress

== See also ==
- Kim Ye-jin (Korean: 김예진; born 1999), South Korean speed skater
