= Lee Eun-ju (politician) =

South Korean politician (born 1969)

- 이은주

Floor leader of the Justice Party
- In office May 2022 – May 2023
- Preceded by: Bae Jin-gyo
- Succeeded by: Bae Jin-gyo

Member of the National Assembly
- In office 30 May 2020 – 25 January 2024
- Constituency: Proportional representation

Personal details
- Born: September 2, 1969 (age 57)
- Party: Justice Party (2013–)
- Other political affiliations: Democratic Labor Party (2000–2008); New Progressive Party (2008–2011); Independent (2011–2013)

Lee Eun-ju (Korean: 이은주; born 2 September 1969) is a South Korean politician.

She began her career as a station staff member, joining the Seoul Subway Corporation in 1993. She was relieved of her position after participating in a strike organised by the National Railway and Subway Union Council in 1994. She subsequently served as the Director of the Women's Affairs Department and the Director of the Policy Department on the union's central executive committee in 1995. In 2008, she became the first woman elected as a station branch president, but was dismissed while opposing the Lee Myung-bak administration's policy of privatising public enterprises. In 2013, she was appointed Head of the Policy Department of the Seoul Subway Union, where she engaged in union activities through labor-management and labor-government negotiations.

== Education ==
- Graduated from the Department of Oriental Philosophy, Sungkyunkwan University.

== Political history ==
In August 2019, she was elected as a member of the Nowon-gu Steering Committee of the Justice Party Seoul City Chapter. In November 2019, she became Chairperson of the Justice Party Special Committee on Public Institutions for Citizens. On 12 May 2020, she was elected as one of the deputy floor leaders of the Justice Party alongside Ryu Ho-jeong and Jang Hye-young. In August 2021, she was appointed as the floor spokesperson of the Justice Party. In May 2022, she was named Justice Party floor leader, succeeding Bae Jin-gyo. In June 2022, she was appointed as Chairperson of the Emergency Response Committee of the Justice Party. In October 2022, Lee Jeong-mi was elected leader, succeeding Lee as ERC chair. In May 2023, she became Senior Deputy Floor Leader of the Justice Party. On 25 January 2024, she resigned as a member of the 21st National Assembly ahead of the Supreme Court of Korea's ruling on her case concerning violations of the Public Official Election Act and was succeeded by Jasmine Bacurnay Lee.

In May 2024, Lee was appointed as Director of Political Affairs of the Justice Party as part of the eighth generation of leadership. She left the position in August 2026 following the election of the ninth generation of leadership.

== Criminal convictions ==
Lee was convicted in one case of obstructing traffic.

=== Election results ===
Year	Election	Assembly	Position	Constituency	Party	Votes	Vote share	Rank	Result	Notes
2020	General election	21st	Member of the National Assembly	Proportional representation	Justice Party	2,697,956	9.67%	5th on the proportional representation list	Elected	First term

== See also ==
- List of members of the National Assembly (South Korea), 2020–2024
- Democratic Labor Party
- New Progressive Party
- Justice Party
- Jasmine Bacurnay Lee
