= Kim Suk-joong =

South Korean soldier (d. 2014)

Kim Suk Joong (died June 2014) was a South Korean military officer and whistleblower. He claimed that the Republic of Korea Army Cyber Command's meddled in the 2013 election.

== Whistleblower ==
Kim was in charge of making composite pictures and videos in a cyber history psychological warfare unit. His work is believed to have been aimed at opposition politicians or cultural and artistic figures who were critical of the government. The Defense Ministry launched an investigation in 2013. Cyber history psychological warfare agents tried to destroy evidence by erasing computer hard disks, but sensitive information such as reports from Cheong Wa Dae (home of the President), was left intact on the computers that Kim submitted to investigation. The ministry announced that it had found no internal and external instructions on intervention in the election. Kim Ki-hyun, former head of the cyber history psychological warfare unit, said that Kim told him that he would "make a declaration of his conscience at an appropriate time". He died about 15 days after saying that.

== Death ==
Kim was assigned to Daegu military hospital, which has nothing to do with intelligence work, after he was reported as a whistleblower," said Kim Jin-pyo, a lawmaker of the opposition Democratic Party of Korea. "He died in a car accident while walking. We should also thoroughly investigate this as well."

"If we look at the data of the 2017 findings, the details are the exact opposite," Kim said. "At that time, Baek Nak-jong, the head of the Defense Ministry's investigation division, asked whether he could cover up suspicions alone, and whether he was willing to thoroughly investigate former Defense Minister Kim Kwan-jin." Defense Minister Song Young-moo said, "The order is not subject to any scope of investigation." Seo Young-kyo of the same party said, "The NIS chief, identified only by his surname Lim, died when there was a cyber problem, and when there was a military cyber problem, Kim Suk Joong was killed in a car accident". "The military should thoroughly investigate and sternly punish those who died while trying to save Korea by declaring their conscience at the time so that there was no unfair death," Song said. "We will completely overhaul the military's cyber history."
