= Senarath Attanayake =

Sri Lankan politician (1966–2017)

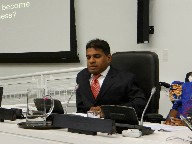
- Senarath Attanayake at the COSP, UNCRPD 2013

Personal details
- Born: 5 August 1966
- Died: 29 August 2017 (aged 51) Colombo, Sri Lanka
- Spouse: Shikanthini Varma (1994 - 2006) Lasanthi Daskon Children Chetianga Attanayake (born July 2000)
- Profession: Lawyer

Attanayake Mudiyanselage Kithsiri Senarath Bandara Attanayake (12 August 1966 – 29 August 2017) known as Senarath Attanayake was a Sri Lankan politician and lawyer.

He was a recipient of the 2016 Henry Viscardi Achievement Award. He was also a member of the Uva Provincial Council, and was the Minister of Agriculture, Irrigation, Livestock, Land and Forestry between 2000 and 2005. He also became acting Chief Minister for a brief period during this tenure. Attanayake was the first person with a disability in Sri Lanka to be an elected representative and a lawyer.

== Early life and education ==
Born to Attanayake Mudiyanselage Jayawardena Attanayake, a former member of parliament (1970–1977 & 1994–1999), former Basnayaka Nilame (Lay Custodian) of the Ruhunu Maha Kataragama Devalaya and Wimala Manathunge of Pitakumbura, a village in the Moneragala District. The eldest in a family of three, with a brother and a sister, at the age of two years he was affected by polio and was a wheelchair user since then. He was educated at the Royal College Colombo and graduated from University of Colombo and passed the law exams of the Sri Lanka Law College becoming an Attorney at law.

== Career ==
Maintaining a successful legal career, Attanayake entered active politics in 1999, following the death of his father. He contested for the Uva Provincial Council Elections, winning a seat and serving as a Minister in his first term.

He represented the Moneragala district – one of the most poverty-stricken and disadvantaged areas of Sri Lanka.

Attanayake was also an activist for making all public places and building in Sri Lanka entirely accessible to wheelchair users. In 2006, he sued Qatar Airways for misplacing his wheelchairs and donated the entire amount to Ragama Rehabilitation Hospital for building proper access for wheelchairs. He had been active in bringing the rights of disabled Sri Lankans to the forefront. He was also pioneering a programme for disability counselling in Sri Lanka.

In 2012, Senarath prepared a set of proposals titled 'Making Moneragala the First Disable Friendly District of Sri Lanka', which he presented to the Uva Provincial Council and also to several organisations and donors. The Country Office of the World Health Organization (WHO) in Colombo took these proposals into consideration and recognising the similarities of the proposals with the Global Age-friendly Cities concept, pledged its support to the project with the altered theme 'Moneragala, the First Disable-friendly/Age-friendly District in Sri Lanka. Accordingly, the Wellawaya Division of Moneragala District was selected as a pilot division for the implementation of the project. This was the second city in southeast Asia to join the network and the first in Sri Lanka.

In December 2012, the Wellawaya Division of Moneragala District joined the Global Age-friendly Cities Network. Senarath co-ordinated the project (pro-bono) which involves DPOs, CBR Networks, WHO-SEARO, WHO-CO in Sri Lanka, Ministry of Social Services, Ministry of Health, Uva Provincial Council, other government administrative bodies and structures and the community of the division in general.

He represented Sri Lanka at the sixth, seventh, and eighth Conferences of State Parties to the United Nations Convention on the Rights of Persons with Disabilities and at the High Level Meeting on Disability and Development held at the United Nations Headquarters in New York on 23 September 2013. He won the Henry Viscardi Achievement Awards given to exemplary leaders with disabilities in 2016.

Senarath was an Adviser to the Export Development Board of Sri Lanka.

== Personal life ==
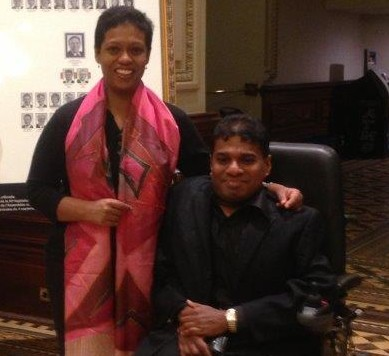
Senarath with his wife Lasanthi at the Quebec Parliament

Senarath was married to Lasanthi Daskon an Attorney-at-Law and a Disability Rights Activist and lived alternatively in Colombo and in Bibila, Sri Lanka. Senarath had one daughter, Chetianga, from his previous marriage to Shikanthini Varma.

== Death ==
Senarath Attanayake died on 29 August 2017 at a private hospital, less than a month after his 51st birthday.

== See also ==
- List of political families in Sri Lanka
- List of physically disabled politicians
- List of poliomyelitis survivors
