= Koh Yong-jin =

South Korean politician

38th Secretary-General of the National Assembly
- Incumbent
- Assumed office June 30, 2026

Member of the National Assembly
- In office 2016–2020
- Constituency: Nowon A

Personal details
- Born: 1964 (age 61–62) Seoul, South Korea
- Education: Seoul National University

Koh Yong-jin (Korean: 고용진; born 1964) is a South Korean politician. Koh is the 38th Secretary-General of the National Assembly. Koh was a member of the National Assembly and the Senior Spokesperson for the Democratic Party of Korea.

== Early life ==
Koh was born in Seoul in 1964. He earned a Bachelor and a Master degree in Communication from Seoul National University. Koh was a secretary of vice speaker of the National Assembly Cho Yoon-hyung.

== Career ==
Koh was a member of the Seoul City Council for two terms. He was an Administration Officer in Roh Moo-hyung´s administration. Koh was also the Senior Spokesperson for the Democratic Party of Korea.

Koh became a member of the National Assembly representing the Nowon-A district in Seoul in 2016, serving 2 terms in the 20th and 21st National Assemblies. Koh was the Chairman of the Subcommittee on Tax of the Strategy and Finance Committee in the National Assembly, and Chairman of the Budget and Accounts Committee in the Democratic Party of Korea. Koh was also Floor Leader of the Democratic Party of Korea. In December 6, 2017, Koh hosted a meeting in the National Assembly on streamer self regulation, which he jointly organized with the Korea Communications Commission and Korea Communication Standards Commission. 19 members of government, the private sector, and academia were invited to the meeting.

On June 30, 2026, Koh became the 38th Secretary-General of the National Assembly. His appointment as Secretary-General necessitated the approval of a plenary session of the National Assembly. In the Secretariat of the National Assembly´s announcement of Koh´s nomination, the Secretariat stated that Koh´s experience in the executive branch, legislative branch, and local government gave Koh a better understanding of the South Korean government´s administration, and that his sense of communication was expected to support bipartisanship. On July 1, 2026, Koh was presented with a letter of appointment at the National Assembly Building by Cho Jeong-sik.
