= Ha Young-je =

South Korean politician

Member of the National Assembly of South Korea
- In office 2020–2024

Personal details
- Born: 25 February 1954 (age 72)
- Party: Independent

Ha Young-je (born 25 February 1954) is a South Korean Independent politician who was elected to the National Assembly in Sacheon–Namhae–Hadong in the 2020 election.

Ha was indicted in 2023 for violations of the Political Funds Act where he received 167.5 million won from lawmakers and officials from South Gyeongsang Province.

On 24 May 2023 he announced his retirement at the 2024 South Korean legislative election.

== See also ==
- List of members of the National Assembly (South Korea), 2020–2024
