= Jasmine Bacurnay Lee =

Filipino South Korean politician (born 1977)

Lee Jasmine
- 이자스민; Jasmine Bacurnay Lee 자스민 바쿠어나이 이

Member of the National Assembly
- In office 29 Jan 2024 – 29 May 2024
- Constituency: Proportional Representation №9
- In office 30 May 2012 – 29 May 2016
- Constituency: Proportional Representation №15

Personal details
- Born: Jasmine Villanueva Bacurnay; January 6, 1977 (age 49) Manila, Philippines
- Party: Justice Party (2019 ~ )
- Other political affiliations: Liberty Korea Party (until 2019)
- Spouse: Lee Dong-ho (m. 1995; died 2010)
- Children: Lee Seung-geun (son); Lee Seung-yeon (daughter)
- Education: Ateneo de Davao University
- Occupation: Actress, TV Host, Civil Servant

Korean name
- Hangul: 이자스민
- Hanja: 李자스민
- RR: I Jaseumin
- MR: I Chasŭmin

Jasmine Bacurnay Lee (born Jasmine Bacurnay y Villanueva; January 6, 1977) is a South Korean television personality, actress and civil servant. Elected as a proportional representative in South Korea's National Assembly in 2012, she is the first non-ethnic Korean and naturalized South Korean to become a lawmaker.

== Early life and education ==
Jasmine was born in the Philippines, in Manila, and moved to Davao when she was a teenager. There she met South Korean mariner Lee Dong-ho when she was a college student majoring in biology at Ateneo de Davao University in 1994. They got married and first visited South Korea in 1995 and finally united in 1996. They have two children, a son Lee Seung-geun and a daughter Lee Seung-yeon. She became a naturalized South Korean in 1998. Her husband died of a heart attack in 2010 while saving their daughter from drowning in a mountain stream in Okcheon, Gangwon while on a family vacation.

== Career ==
Since 2006, she has been a panelist on the KBS program "Love in Asia" and has also appeared on a Korean language program on educational channel EBS.

As an actress, she played the role of the mother of lead actor Yoo Ah-in in the highly acclaimed 2011 film Punch which drew 5.3 million viewers. She also appeared in the 2010 film Secret Reunion.

In January 2012, Lee became the first Filipino to receive the Korea Image Millstone Award from the Corea Image Communication Institute (CICI). She was cited for her volunteer and charity works for foreign immigrants in South Korea. An advocate of multiculturalism in South Korea, she regularly gives lectures about the subject to teachers and student leaders.

She is the secretary general of Waterdrop, a charity formed by foreign spouses of South Koreans, and worked at the Foreign Residents Assistance Division of the Seoul Metropolitan Government.

On April 11, 2012, she was elected as a proportional representative in South Korea's National Assembly election following her party's majority victory in the polls held. With her win, she made history in South Korea as the first Filipina and naturalized South Korean to become a lawmaker. Lee's win was a result of the victory of the ruling Saenuri Party, to which she belongs.

Lee was excluded from the party's list for the 2016 election and left office on May 29, 2016. Lee left the Saenuri Party after the 2016 election. She returned to politics in 2020 ahead of the 2020 South Korean legislative election as a candidate for the Justice Party.

Lee was once again elected to Parliament on 25 January 2024 after the resignation of MP Lee Eun-ju. Not only is Lee the first ethnic minority lawmaker in Korean history, but Lee is the first parliamentarian in Korean history to switch from a conservative to progressive party and be re-elected. Lee's inauguration ceremony was held in the Justice Party Press Room of the National Assembly on 1 February 2024.

== Criticism ==
Since the 2012 election, Lee has been hit by charges of misrepresenting her education, after claiming on national television to have attended medical school in the Philippines when in fact she had simply taken biology classes during college.

Some South Koreans engaged in racist criticism of Lee, stating that she was not a "true" South Korean due to being from the Philippines. One South Korean spoke out against the racist behavior of Lee's critics, stating that South Koreans were more concerned about engaging in racist vitriol against politicians, whereas in other countries, people were more concerned about a politician's professional qualifications.
