= Bae Jin-gyo =

South Korean politician (born 1968)

- 배진교

Secretary for Public Listening
- Incumbent
- Assumed office July 2025
- President: Lee Jae Myung
- Preceded by: Office established

Floor leader of the Justice Party
- In office 9 May 2023 – 14 February 2024
- Preceded by: Lee Eun-ju
- Succeeded by: Sim Sang-jung
- In office 4 May 2021 – 4 May 2022
- Preceded by: Kang Eun-mi
- Succeeded by: Lee Eun-ju
- In office 30 May 2020 – 1 September 2020
- Preceded by: Yun So-ha
- Succeeded by: Kang Eun-mi

Member of the National Assembly
- In office 30 May 2020 – 30 May 2024
- Constituency: Proportional representation

Mayor of Namdong-gu, Incheon
- In office 1 July 2010 – 30 June 2014
- Preceded by: Yoon Tae-jin
- Succeeded by: Jang Seok-hyun

Personal details
- Born: 26 August 1968 (age 58) Jeongeup, Jeonbuk, South Korea
- Party: Independent (2024–2025, 2025–)
- Other political affiliations: Democratic Party (2025); Justice Party (2012–2024); Unified Progressive Party (2011–2012); Democratic Labor Party (2003–2011)

Bae Jin-gyo (Korean: 배진교, born 26 August 1968) is a South Korean politician who was a member of the 21st National Assembly. He previously served as the 10th Mayor of Namdong-gu, Incheon from 2010 to 2014.

== Career ==
Bae joined the Democratic Labor Party and was appointed chairman of the party's Namdong-gu Committee in 2003.

In the 2004 South Korean legislative election, he ran as a candidate for the Democratic Labor Party for the Namdong-gu Eul constituency but was defeated by Lee Ho-ung of the Uri Party.

In the 2006 South Korean local elections, he ran for Mayor of Namdong-gu, Incheon, as a candidate for the Democratic Labor Party, but was defeated by Grand National Party candidate Yoon Tae-jin.

In the 2008 South Korean legislative election, he ran as a Democratic Labor Party candidate for the Incheon Namdong-gu Eul constituency but was defeated by Grand National Party candidate Cho Jeon-hyuk. Following his defeat, he served as vice-chairman of the Democratic Labor Party's Incheon City Committee.

In the 2010 South Korean local elections he was selected as the unified opposition candidate and ran for and won the election for Mayor of Namdong-gu, Incheon, representing the Democratic Labor Party.

Due to a conflict with the leadership of the Unified Progressive Party, he left the party on 7 September 2012, and joined the Progressive Justice Party, which was founded by former members of the Unified Progressive Party.

In the 2014 South Korean local elections, he ran for the position of Mayor of Namdong-gu as a Justice Party candidate but was defeated by Saenuri Party candidate Jang Seok-hyun. Following his unsuccessful bid for the district mayoralty, he served as an open-recruitment auditor for the Incheon Metropolitan City Office of Education.

In the 2018 South Korean local elections, he ran for the position of Mayor of Namdong-gu as a Justice Party candidate but was defeated by Democratic Party of Korea candidate Lee Kang-ho.

In the 2020 South Korean legislative election, he participated in the Justice Party's primary for proportional representation candidates, was assigned the fourth spot on the list, and was elected as a proportional representation member of the National Assembly.

Between May and September 2020, he served as the floor leader of the Justice Party.

On 26 June 2020, he was appointed as head of the People's Livelihood Headquarters.

Between May 2021 and May 2022, he served as floor leader of the Justice Party and again between May 2023 and February 2024.

In November 2023, Bae became chairman of the Emergency Response Committee of the Justice Party.

On 14 February 2024, he resigned as Floor Leader of the Green-Justice Party.

On 22 January 2025, Bae, alongside Choo Hye-seon and Yun So-ha, joined the Democratic Party.

Bae in 2021

In February 2025, he was appointed as a special advisor on public welfare to Democratic Party leader Lee Jae-myung.

From July 2025, he has served as Secretary for Listening to the People.

== Education ==
- Bachelor's degree in Public Administration, Korea National Open University.
- Horary diploma in Public Administration, Graduate School of Incheon National University.

== Previous convictions ==
- Violation of the Act on Punishment of Violent Acts etc, Violation of the Act on Punishment of the Use of Molotov Cocktails, etc. Imprisonment for one year and was sentenced on June 20, 1990.

== Election history ==
Year	Election	Assembly	Position	Constituency	Party	Votes	Vote share	Rank	Result	Notes
2004	17th National Assembly General election	17th	Member of the National Assembly	Namdong District B, Incheon	Democratic Labor Party	7,594	9.31%	3rd	Defeated	
2006	4th Local election	9th	District mayor	Mayor of Namdong District, Incheon	Democratic Labor Party	15,983	13.09%	3rd	Defeated	
2006	by-election	17th	Member of the National Assembly	Namdong District B, Incheon	Democratic Labor Party	6,338	18.50%	2nd	Defeated	
2008	18th National Assembly General election	18th	Member of the National Assembly	Namdong District B, Incheon	Democratic Labor Party	7,037	11.67%	4th	Defeated	
2010	5th Local election	10th	District mayor	Mayor of Namdong District, Incheon	Democratic Labor Party	96,110	54.98%	1st	Won	First election local
2014	6th Local election	11th	District mayor	Mayor of Namdong District, Incheon	Justice Party	105,320	49.71%	2nd	Defeated	
2018	7th Local election	12th	District mayor	Mayor of Namdong District, Incheon	Justice Party	53,254	22.02%	3rd	Defeated	
2020	21st National Assembly General election	21st	Member of the National Assembly	Proportional representation	Justice Party	2,697,956	9.67%	4th on party list	Elected	First election

== See also ==
- Democratic Labor Party
- Unified Progressive Party
- Justice Party
- Democratic Party
- List of members of the National Assembly (South Korea), 2020–2024
