= Jungnang A =

Constituency in Seoul, South Korea

- Single-member constituency for the National Assembly
- Location of the constituency
- District(s): Jungnang District (part)
- Region: Seoul
- Electorate: 160,283 (2016)

Current constituency
- Created: 1988
- Seats: 1
- Party: Democratic Party
- Member: Seo Young-kyo
- Created from: Dongdaemun

Jungnang A (Korean: 중랑구 갑) is a constituency of the National Assembly of South Korea. The constituency consists of part of Jungnang District, Seoul. As of 2016, 160,283 eligible voters were registered in the constituency.

== List of members of the National Assembly ==
Election	Member	Party	Dates	Notes
1988	Lee Sang-soo	Peace Democratic	1988–1992	
1992	Lee Soon-jae	Democratic Liberal	1992–1996	Actor
1996	Lee Sang-soo	National Congress	1996–2004	Minister of Labor (2006–2008)
2000	Lee Sang-soo	Millennium Democratic	1996–2004	Minister of Labor (2006–2008)
2004	Lee Hwa-young	Uri	2004–2008	
2008	Yoo Jung-hyun	Grand National	2008–2012	
2012	Seo Young-kyo	Democratic United	2012–present	
2016	Seo Young-kyo	Democratic	2012–present	
2020	Seo Young-kyo	Democratic	2012–present	
2024	Seo Young-kyo	Democratic	2012–present	

== Recent election results ==
=== 2024 ===
Legislative Election 2024: Jungnang A
Party	Candidate	Votes	%	±%
Democratic	Seo Young-kyo	60,881	61.92	▲4.16
People Power	Kim Sam-hwa	37,429	38.07	▲1.79
Rejected ballots		1,391	–	
Turnout		99,701	63.82	▲2.79
Registered electors		156,202		
Democratic hold		Swing		

=== 2020 ===
Legislative Election 2020: Jungnang A
Party	Candidate	Votes	%	±%
Democratic	Seo Young-kyo	55,185	57.76	+3.56
United Future	Kim Sam-hwa	34,670	36.28	+4.78
Justice	Kim Ji-soo	2,706	2.83	new
Independent	Lee Seong-bok	1,109	1.16	new
Minsaeng	Lee Ki-hyon	754	0.78	new
Minjung	Seong Chi-hwa	624	0.65	new
National Revolutionary	Park Myeong-soo	492	0.51	new
Rejected ballots		1,145	–	–
Turnout		96,685	61.03	+7.63
Registered electors		158,409		
Democratic hold		Swing		

=== 2016 ===
Legislative Election 2016: Jungnang A
Party	Candidate	Votes	%	±%
Democratic	Seo Young-kyo	45,838	54.2	+13.3
Saenuri	Kim Jin-soo	26,622	31.5	+7.8
People's Party (South Korea, 2016)	Min Byung-rok	11,429	13.5	new
Rejected ballots		901	–	–
Turnout		85,545	53.4	+2.5
Registered electors		160,283		
Democratic hold		Swing		

=== 2012 ===
Legislative Election 2012: Jungnang A
Party	Candidate	Votes	%	±%
Democratic United	Seo Young-kyo	33,891	40.9	+27.6
Saenuri	Kim Jeong	19,647	23.7	−16.8
Independent	Yoo Jung-hyun	18,989	22.9	−17.6
Independent	Lee Sang-soo	8,115	9.8	−21.4
Rejected ballots		578	–	–
Turnout		83,413	50.9	+8.7
Registered electors		163,898		
Democratic United gain from Saenuri		Swing		

== See also ==
- List of constituencies of the National Assembly of South Korea
