= Park Sang-hyuk =

South Korean politician (born 1973)

- 박상혁

Member of the National Assembly
- Incumbent
- Assumed office 30 May 2020
- Preceded by: Hong Chul-ho
- Constituency: Gimpo 2nd

Executive Officer for Judicial Affairs of the Office of the President
- In office 31 May 2017 – 7 May 2019
- President: Moon Jae-in

Personal details
- Born: 20 March 1973 (age 53) Gimpo, South Korea
- Party: Democratic
- Parent: Park Chul (brother)
- Education: Hanyang University; Chonnam National University; Erasmus University Rotterdam
- Occupation: Activist, lawyer, politician

Park Sang-hyuk (Korean: 박상혁, born 20 March 1973) is a South Korean activist, lawyer and politician. A member of the liberal Democratic Party, he is the incumbent Member of the National Assembly for Gimpo 2nd constituency since 2020. Politically, he is close to the former Mayor of Seoul Park Won-soon.

Park had previously served as the President of the Student Council during schooldays and later became a secretary of 2 former MPs — Kim Geun-tae and Lim Chae-jung. After qualifying for the bar in 2012, he became a lawyer and handled several cases, including Lance Corporal Yoon case in 2014. Prior to be elected to the National Assembly, he served as the political adviser to Park Won-soon while he was the Mayor of Seoul in 2016, as well as the Executive Officer for Judicial Affairs of the Office of the President under the President Moon Jae-in from 2017 to 2019.

== Early life and education ==
Park Sang-hyuk was born on 20 March 1973, the son of a trade worker who had ever been to Africa during the 1970s and 1980s. His second elder brother, Park Chul, is a poet. He was educated at Gaehwa Primary School, Banghwa Secondary School and Konghang High School. He went to the Hanyang University, where he consecutively graduated with a LLB, an LLM and a PhD degree in International Law. He then moved to the Netherlands and obtained a postgraduate LLM degree in Business Law at the Erasmus University Rotterdam. He also studied law at the Chonnam National University.

While studying at Hanyang University, he had completed his national service at the Joint Security Area (JSA) from 1994 to 1997. Prior to the 1996 election, North Korea had sent the armed forces to Panmunjom. Regarding this incident, he said, "I have clearly seen the politicised fake national security."

== Student activist career ==
During the schooldays, Park served as the President of the Student Council for 3 times; firstly at Konghang High School (1989), then at Hanyang University for 2 other times — within the Faculty of Law (1998) and the universitywide (1999). Shortly after elected the President of the Student Council at Hanyang University, he joined the South Korean Federation of University Students Councils, a left-wing student organisation that was declared illegal in 1998. He was wanted for this activities and could not return to home for more than a year. Following his arrest, he was sentenced to 10 months in prison under the breach of the National Security Act on 15 February 1999. He was pardoned on 15 August.

== Legal career ==
Park had passed the 1st National Bar Examination and was qualified for the bar in 2012. The next year, he started his legal career, starting as a town lawyer in Gochon-eup, Gimpo. He subsequently joined a law firm named LawTec, where he used to work for a year. Then, he moved to Changjo and was involved until 2016.

As a lawyer, he was also a legal adviser in various governmental organisations, including Nowon District Office, Seongdong District Office, Seoul Metropolitan Facilities Management Corporation (now Seoul Facilities Corporation) and the Seoul Metropolitan Council.

In 2014, following the Lance Corporal Yoon case, where the victim Lance Corporal Yoon was bullied and murdered, Park pled the family of the late Yoon. Along with Chung Yeon-soon, he urged that the defendants should be punished for reckless homicide. On 30 October, the defendants had been sentenced from 15 to 45 years of imprisonments, but for accidental mortality instead of homicide. Park criticised the sentence, citing "they must be punished for murder on appeal". Homicide was applied to the defendants during an appeal on 9 April 2015.

On 22 June 2019, Park opened his own law firm in Gurae-dong, named Gimpo and Together With Park Sang-hyuk Law Firm (김포와더불어 박상혁 법률사무소).

== Political career ==
Park has also been built ties with politics prior to his legal career. At the 2004 election, he helped Lee In-young, the then Uri candidate for Guro 1st constituency. Following the Uri's victory in the election amid the impeachment of the then President Roh Moo-hyun, he became a secretary to Kim Geun-tae, the then parliamentary leader of the party. Being his secretary for a year, he then also became a secretary to Lim Chae-jung, who served as the Speaker of the National Assembly from 2006 to 2008.

In 2016, he worked as the political adviser to the then Mayor of Seoul Park Won-soon. The following year, after Moon Jae-in was elected the President, he was appointed the Executive Officer for Judicial Affairs of the Office of the President. He announced his resignation on 7 May 2019, in order to run for the 2020 election.

=== 2020 legislative election ===
On 16 December 2019, Park announced he would run for Gimpo 2nd constituency in the 2020 election through YouTube and Facebook.

On 17 February 2020, he was excluded from the Democratic preselection. He criticised the party's decision and submitted an appeal in order to be a pre-candidate. A week later, he posted on his Facebook that his appeal was accepted and was allowed to contest preselection. While the other pre-candidates have ever convicted of driving under the influence (DUI) before, Park emphasised that he does not have any criminal records related to DUI.

After won preselection on 5 March, Park faced a challenge from the incumbent MP and the United Future candidate Hong Chul-ho. Despite the early leading, on 15 April, the exit poll showed that Hong came closed to Park (Park: 49.6%, Hong: 48.7%). However, Park received 53.83% and was elected with a majority of 10,993. Along with Kim Nam-kuk from the same party, he became the first MP graduated from a law school.

== Trivia ==
Park is a colleague to Kim Chang-yeol, a member of a hip-hop trio DJ DOC. Both has been colleagues since primary school.

He is married.

== Election results ==
=== General elections ===
Year	Constituency	Political party	Votes (%)	Remarks
2020	Gimpo 2nd	Democratic	63,193 (53.83%)	Won
