= Childbirth in South Korea =

This article documents traditional and some modern childbirth practices in Korea. Korea has some special cultures in terms of childbirth. Korea reached 0.95 birthrate in 2019, which is the lowest among OECD countries. Most women give birth at hospitals. There are also special postpartum care centers, called sanjuhori.

== Background ==
Some women gave birth at their own home but most births happened in the husband’s house. Women would place straw on the floor, Pregnant woman would also wear a black skirt before birth. Usually, mother-in-law or other experienced women helped with the procedure. The umbilical cord would typically be cut with a pair of scissors. In some provinces, the umbilical cord was covered with straw or paper and then burned on the third day. Some provinces put it in a small pot and let it flow down the river.

After the birth, the family tied a gold rope around the front door. If it was a boy, they would weave paper, pine, straw, and charcoal. It would be hung for 7, 21, and 49 days. between these days, neighbors and other people are not allowed to visit. On the third day, the woman and the baby wash for the first time. On the seventh day, the baby takes off his/her diaper and wears clothes without a collar. And on the fourteenth day, he/she wears clothes with a collar. When the rope is taken off, cousins and neighbors are allowed to visit the family to celebrate.

Traditionally, when a woman realized she was pregnant, she would tell her mother-in-law first, then her husband and lastly her mother. Thereafter, the whole family would assist tending to her needs, as opposed to her tending to theirs.

=== Birthrate and women's health statistics ===
Korea’s birthrate has reached 0.95 in 2019. This rate is the lowest ever since 1981 and it is the lowest among other OECD countries. OECD countries average birthrate is 1.68.

Birthrate in Korea by year

Year	1970	1980	1990	2000	2010	2019
Birthrate	4.53	2.82	1.57	1.47	1.23	0.95

In 2018, women who got medical treatment were 24,725,205. Woman who visited hospital due to deficiency of iron anemia was 282,720, which is four times the man. Most of the women with iron deficiency anemia were 40s. People who visited hospital with folate deficiency anemia were total 3,355. And 2,398 were woman. People with cervical cancer are constantly increasing. On 2018, the number was 62,071.

== Labor and birth ==
=== Support during labor ===
Most of the women in Korea prepare their birth in a hospital. Women get care from public health centers as well as hospitals. In Korea, fathers have not traditionally been present during delivery.

=== Birth attendants and health care providers ===
Births in Korea are attended by either licensed doctors or experienced midwives. At some hospitals, they keep the baby in the nursery for the first 24 hours.

=== Technology in birth ===
42% of deliveries are by Cesarean delivery, Cesarean section and 58% of the deliveries are by natural childbirth. Birthing pools are available for labor and delivery in some hospitals. Episiotomies are still commonly performed in Korea.

This chart gives more information about some hospitals technology.

Location	Seoul	Gwang myeong	Ansan	Gimhae	Busan	Seoul	Seoul	Seoul	Seoul
Hospital’s name	Yeon & Nature	GM Cheil Women’s Clinic	Agitanseng Natural Birth Center	Prime Woman’s Clinic	Good culture Hospital	Soon Chun Hyang	Cha hospital	Medi Flower	Sansung Gangbuk
Water birth Available	Yes	Yes	Yes	No	No	Yes	Yes	Yes	Yes
Showers in Room	Yes	Yes	No	Yes	Yes	No	Yes	Yes	Yes
Birth stool available	Yes	Yes	Yes	No	No	Yes	Yes	Yes	No
Neonatal intensive care	No	Incubator	No	No	Yes	Yes	Yes	No	Yes
Available to perform C-section	Yes	Yes	No	Yes	Yes	Yes	Yes	Yes	Yes
Number of natural birthing suites	10	4	2	3	3	2	1	8	2

== Pregnancy behaviors and belief ==
=== Prenatal care in person and socially ===
Women's bodies undergo the process of pregnancy and childbirth and have many changes. Therefore, there is prenatal care such as managing the reduction of stress in babies and mothers, managing edema and pain prevention, preparing safe delivering in the last month of pregnancy, chapped skin prevention.

The society also implements a policy of consideration for pregnant women. They include the Maternal Health Act, the National Health Insurance Act, the Health Household Basic Act, the Multicultural Family Support Act, the Gender Equality and Work for Men and Women, the Labor Standards Act, the Women's Development Framework Act and the Basic Law for Low Birth and Aging Society. In addition, the health insurance system provides support for pregnant women during pregnancy (including postpartum) in the form of electronic vouchers, and some of the major prenatal examinations for health care of fetuses from conception can be applied to health insurance. According to the prenatal care report provided in the Standard Maternal Health Diary, it is recommended to visit prenatal care once every four weeks until 28 weeks (7 months) of pregnancy, once every two weeks (8–9 months) from 28 weeks of pregnancy to 36 weeks of pregnancy, once every week from 36 weeks of pregnancy to delivery. For the first time in the world, seats were made for pregnant women in buses and subways. It was made for early pregnant women and all pregnant women who could not be identified, but there are criticisms of its effectiveness and other things.

For the first time in the world, seats were made for pregnant women in buses and subways. In Korea, there were incidents in which an old man assaulted a pregnant woman in public spaces. It was made for early pregnant women and all pregnant women, but there are criticisms of its effectiveness and other things. This is because there is that the assault on pregnant women continues still. And the problem exists that people who are not pregnant sit down. Also, dispute that people waste their seats when they are crowded, such as during rush hour threatens to be aggravated.

=== Preparation in birth ===
In Korea, women are encouraged to minimize their movements. They also think that the mother's thoughts and mindset affect the child, so they have a "tae-gyo(태교)" where they are careful and comfortable about everything, including food and behavior. The mom-to-be was expected to only look at ‘beautiful’ things such as flowers, animals and to not look on ‘dead’ things. Everything she ate, felt, thought or saw could influence the physical characteristics of the baby. There are many myths, especially about food. She could only eat foods that were unblemished and had to avoid broken or crooked pieces of fruit, vegetable, etc. Pregnant women were not allowed to eat duck because the baby might be born with webbed feet if she did. There are also rumors that eating beans and nuts during pregnancy makes the child smarter. During this period, the family made sure that negative events in the family were kept from her so that she would only have ‘good’ thoughts. In addition, acquaintance buys shoes and baby items for children in advance, and the mother herself gets information about childcare at the internet community consists of mothers.

== Postpartum ==
=== Postnatal care center: san-hu-jo-ri center (산후조리원) ===
Postpartum care is the act of stabilizing the bodies of mothers who have undergone pregnancy and childbirth to recover. However, this is a term referring to the period of rest after all diseases, and Korea's postnatal care culture exists as a separate item called 'san-hu-jo-ri.' The postnatal care center first appeared in Korea in 1997.

Traditionally, women did postpartum care at home. However, as more women entered society, they could not afford postnatal care at home, and they needed someone to take care of their mothers by becoming a nuclear family, which led to the emergence of postnatal care centers. In particular, the government did not have the policy to support childbirth in those days, and the economic power of households has declined since a bailout request to IMF in 2007, causing a huge burden on individuals for childbirth.

Number of San-hu-jo-ri center in Korea
	Seoul	Busan	Dae-gu	In-cheon	Gwang-ju	Dae-jeon	Ul-san	Se-jong	Gyeong-gi-do	Gang-won-do	Chung-chung-do	Jeon-Ra-do	Gyeong-sang-do	Je-ju
num	147	28	27	22	8	15	9	3	166	16	28	26	51	9

The postpartum care center's legal standards were finalized in 2009 in the revised Maternal Health Act, and the postpartum care center industry grew significantly. According to the 2018 fertility survey released by the Korea Institute for Health and Social Affairs, 75.1 percent of women use postpartum care centers after giving birth. At the postnatal care center, the mother prepares to return to her daily life by taking a rest, learning what she has to do as a parent, such as breastfeeding, how to deal with newborn babies, and learning yoga to care for her body after childbirth. In addition, postpartum care centers are tasked with sleeping, bathing, and checking the mother's health care. The postpartum care center owned by the Korean government was 1.9 million won as of 2016, and the national average postpartum care center charge was 2.47 million won as of June 2018, announced by the Ministry of Health and Welfare.

Despite treating newborns and mothers with weak immune systems, many postpartum care centers have poor and unsanitary conditions or non-professional employment problems. As of 2019, there have been more than 400 cases of virus infection at postpartum care centers in the past four years. For this reason, some are critical of exposing newborns and mothers to postpartum care centers that many people visit. It seems necessary to improve the law, which lacks the punishment clause. As the average age of marriage in South Korea increases, the age of giving birth to children is also aging. This naturally increases the risk of childbirth for mothers. The demand for postpartum care centers is expected to rise further.

Opinions are divided as to why postpartum care culture has developed in Korea. There is a theory that it is because Westerners have bigger pelvis than Asians, but the relationship has not been proved exactly. Socially, in the case of women, it is difficult for them to take maternity leave, and also it is not common for men to take paternity leave, so they prefer to go to postpartum care centers even if they pay a high price. In fact, the reasons for using postpartum care centers in Korea were 'easy for postnatal care' (36.5%) and 'to get help from an infant specialist' (18.7%) respectively. In South America and the Muslim, there is a postnatal care culture, and in recent years, Korea's unique postnatal care culture is spreading to Japan and China.

=== Postpartum depression ===
Postpartum depression can occur to both parents after childbirth. Symptoms include sadness, lethargy, sleep disorders, and eating disorders. The cause has yet to be determined, but hormonal changes and major changes in life are thought to be the main causes.

In 2017, 8,291 mothers were diagnosed with a high risk of postpartum depression at the health center, a 2.6-fold increase in the two-year period. However, only 48 percent of them were actively consulted. Korea's unique social atmosphere, which emphasizes motherhood rather than human rights, often neglects postpartum depression. Also, Koh Young-hoon, a professor of mental health medicine at Korea University, said that due to the Korean cultural characteristics, there is a higher incidence of postpartum depression than in other countries as they often engage in single parenting.

== New borns ==
=== Bathing ===
After returning from postnatal care, bathing a newborn can be challenging for parents. Bathing in the immediate postbirth period can carry risks such as hypothermia, respiratory compromise and increased oxygen consumption. If using a bathtub shared by adults, ensure that the bath equipment is disinfected before and after each use. This will help reduce the harbouring of microorganisms. Bathing a newborn brings special care and attention towards factors such as bath safety, temperature of room and water, hand placement, and cleanser/soap options.

=== Naming ===
Korean thinks names affect their lives, so when parents name child, they usually go to famous philosophy or temples to get a good name. As a result, the rate of change in name is also increasing.

Popularity ranking of baby name in 2017
	male	female
1	Do Yoon(도윤)	Ha Yoon(하윤)
2	Ha Jun(하준)	Seo Yoon(서윤)
3	Seo Jun(서준)	Seo Yeon(서연)
4	Si Woo(시우)	Ha Eun(하은)
5	Min Jun(민준)	Ji Yu(지유)

Before the 2000s, when the male preference was intense, women's names were sometimes named with "Ja(자)," meaning man, and "suk(숙)," were now considered old-fashioned. When parents naming babies recently, they prefer soft-spoken like ‘y(ㅇ in Korean spell)’ and neutral names. The increasing popularity of names consisting of Han-gul, not Chinese characters, has increased. Korean name is composed of last name and given name. And the law that only followed my father's family name has revising recently, so some child can follow their mother's family name now.
