= Yang Kyung-sook =

South Korean politician (born 1962)

- 양경숙

Member of the National Assembly
- Incumbent
- Assumed office 30 May 2020
- Constituency: Proportional representation

Personal details
- Born: 6 September 1962 (age 64) Imsil, South Korea
- Party: Democratic
- Education: Soongsil University; Yonsei University; Korea University
- Religion: Roman Catholic (Christian name : Regina)

Yang Kyung-sook (Korean: 양경숙; Hanja: 梁敬淑; born 6 September 1962) is a South Korean politician currently serving as a Democratic member of National Assembly.

In 2020 general election, she was placed as the number 17 on the proportional representation list for Platform Party, a sister party of Democratic Party. After the election, two parties merged allowing her to return to the party to which she dedicated her political career from 1991.

She has previously served as a member of Seoul Metropolitan Council representing Jongno District twice from 1995 to 2002. She took numerous roles in her party and its preceding parties such as its deputy chair of Women's Committee, deputy chair of Policy Planning Committee and many more for almost thirty years from 1991 when she was first recruited to the party after participating in pro-democracy movement against the authoritarian regime of Chun Doo-hwan in 1980s.

Yang holds three degrees - a bachelor in Korean literature from Soongsil University and a master's and a doctorate in administration from Yonsei University and Korea University respectively.

Yang is frequently mistaken for other politician with criminal records who has same Korean name and previously held democratic party membership.

== Electoral history ==
| Election | Year | District | Party affiliation | Votes | Percentage of votes | Results |
|---|---|---|---|---|---|---|
| 21st National Assembly General Election | 2020 | Proportional representation | Platform Party | 9,307,112 | 33.3% | Won |
