= Shin Hyun-young =

South Korean doctor and politician

- 신현영

Member of the National Assembly
- Incumbent
- Assumed office 30 May 2020
- Constituency: Proportional representation

Personal details
- Born: 17 November 1980 (age 45) Seoul, South Korea
- Party: Democratic
- Education: Catholic University of Korea; Yonsei University; Catholic Kwandong University

Shin Hyun-young (Korean: 신현영; Hanja: 申賢榮; born 17 November 1980) is a South Korean doctor specialised in Family medicine currently serving as a Democratic member of National Assembly.

== Background ==
In 2020 election, Shin was on the top of the list for then-Platform Party's proportional representation. Her nomination was in strict contrast to the vice president of Korea Medical Association who joined the main opposition's sister party for its proportional representation list but resigned after he was placed as the number 22 of the list. After the election, her party merged with its sister party, Democratic Party. She is now its deputy floor leader.

She is widely known to the public as the co-author of the article which synthesises information related to the recovery of the third COVID-19 patient in Korea treated with AIDS medicine.

Before entering politics, she was an assistant professor of family medicine at Hanyang University and led family medicine department at Myongji Hospital. Moreover, Shin was director of multiple medical associations - Korean Association of Family Medicine, Association of Healthcare for Korean Unification, Korean Medical Women's Association, Korean Intern Resident Association and finally - and largest - Korea Medical Association (KMA). She was also KMA's spokesperson.

Shin holds three degrees in medicine - M.D. from Catholic University of Korea, a master's in Epidemiology from Yonsei University and a doctorate in medicine from Catholic Kwandong University. She graduated from one of the elite secondary education institutions in the country, Seoul Science High School.

== Electoral history ==
Election	Year	District	Party affiliation	Votes	Percentage of votes	Results
21st National Assembly General Election	2020	Proportional representation	Platform Party	9,307,112	33.3%	Won
