= Yoo Jung-ju =

South Korean animator and politician

- 유정주
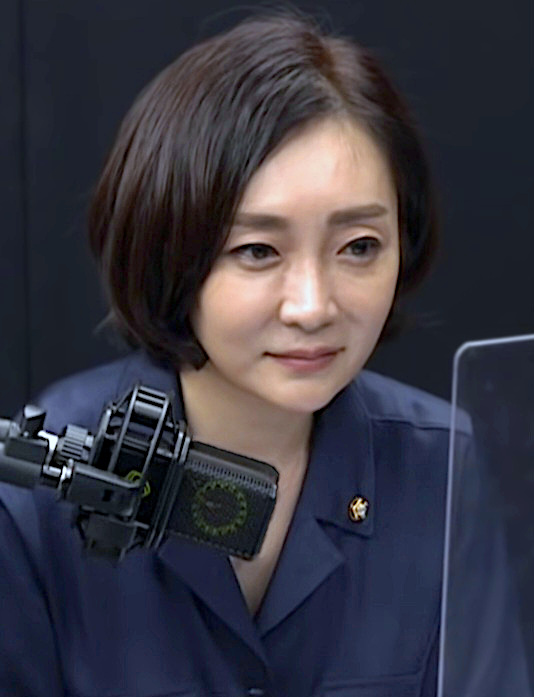
- Yoo Jung-ju, c.2021

Member of the National Assembly
- Incumbent
- Assumed office 30 May 2020

Personal details
- Born: 13 December 1975 (age 50)
- Party: Democratic
- Education: Sangmyung University; Dongguk University

Yoo Jung-ju (Korean: 유정주; Hanja: 兪訂炷; born 13 December 1975) is a South Korean animator currently serving as a Democratic member of National Assembly.

Yoo runs the animator company Gotagi (Korean: 꽃다지) and previously led the Korea Animation Industry Association. In the 2020 general election, she was recruited by Platform Party as part of its efforts to prioritise representatives of the civil societies and industries for its proportional representation list. She was placed as the number 10 on the list and her nomination was welcomed by animation industry trade unions.

She was also the member of Presidential Council on Intellectual Property chaired by then Prime Minister Lee Nak-yeon.

Yoo is a daughter of Yoo Sung-woong who produced popular animation films in 1980s

Yoo holds two degrees in film studies - a bachelor from Sangmyung University and a master's from Dongguk University. She also completed a doctorate programme at Dongguk University.

== Electoral history ==
Election	Year	District	Party affiliation	Votes	Percentage of votes	Results
21st National Assembly General Election	2020	Proportional representation	Platform Party	9,307,112	33.3%	Won
