= Kang Eun-mi =

South Korean politician (born 1970)

- 강은미
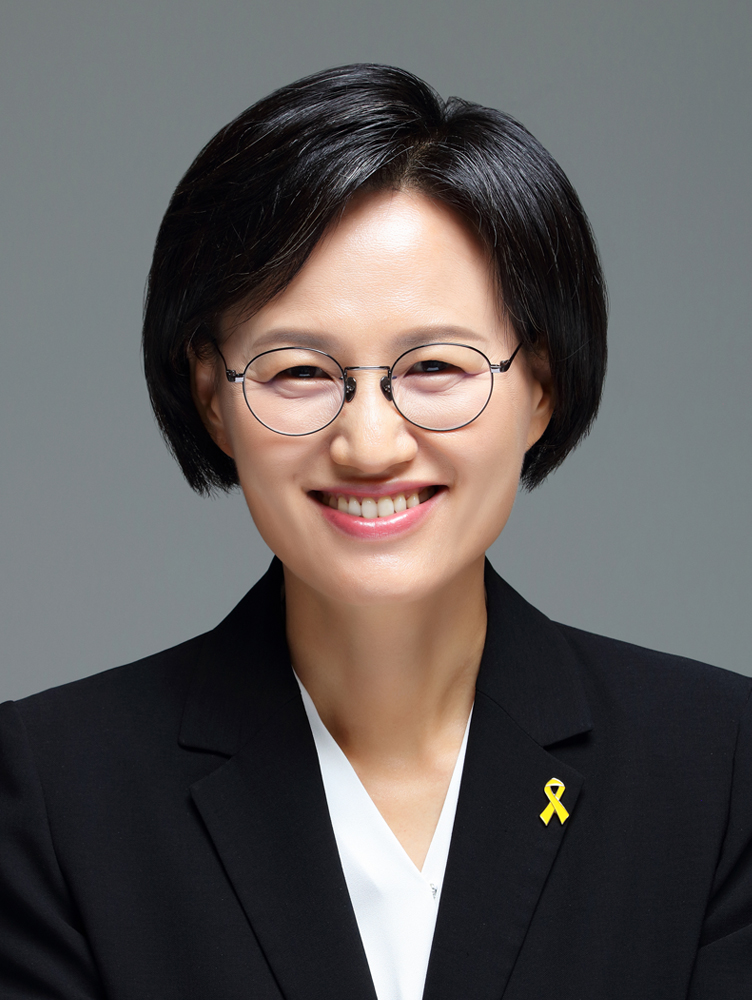

Floor leader of the Justice Party
- In office 9 September 2020 – 23 March 2021
- Preceded by: Bae Jin-gyo
- Succeeded by: Bae Jin-gyo

Interim Leader of the Justice Party
- In office 29 January 2021 – 23 March 2021
- Preceded by: Kim Yun-ki (acting)
- Succeeded by: Yeo Yeong-gug

Member of the National Assembly
- Incumbent
- Assumed office 30 May 2020

Personal details
- Born: 6 September 1970 (age 56) Gwangju, Honam, South Korea
- Party: Justice Party
- Education: Chonnam National University
- Religion: Roman Catholic

Korean name
- Hangul: 강은미
- Hanja: 姜恩美
- RR: Gang Eunmi
- MR: Kang Ŭnmi

Kang Eun-mi (Korean: 강은미; born 6 September 1970) is a South Korean politician. She is currently a member of the 21st National Assembly representing the Justice Party, where she serves as floor leader of the party. (Note: As Leader of the Emergency Response Committee, as Leader of Emergency Response Conference until 30 January.)
