= Yang Yiwonyoung =

South Korean environmentalist and politician

- 양이원영

Member of the National Assembly
- Incumbent
- Assumed office 30 May 2020
- Constituency: Proportional representation

Personal details
- Born: Yang Won-young; 14 May 1971 (age 55)
- Party: Democratic (Nov 2021 - present)
- Other political affiliations: Independent (June 2021-Nov 2021) Democratic (2020–2021); Platform (2020)
- Education: Sogang University; KDI School of Public Policy and Management; HHL Leipzig Graduate School of Management

Yang Yiwonyoung or Yang Yi Wonyoung (Korean: 양이원영; Hanja: 梁李媛瑛; born 14 May 1971) is a South Korean politician and environmentalist currently serving as an independent member of National Assembly.

== Biography ==
Yang holds three degrees: a bachelor in biology from Sogang University, a MPP from KDI School of Public Policy and Management and MBA from HHL Leipzig Graduate School of Management.

Before entering politics, Yang dedicated her career in civil societies, specifically environment movements. She has worked at Korea Federation for Environmental Movements for over a decade. She also led civil movements calling for nuclear free societies and transition to green(er) energy.

In the 2020 general election, she was recruited by and joined Platform Party after the party launched their version of the Green New Deal. After the election, Platform Party and its sister party, Democratic Party, merged as planned which resulted in her becoming a member of the party she previously criticised for "its lack of green initiatives and pro-nuclear energy stances."

She legally changed her name to Yang Yiwonyoung (Yang as last name and the rest as given name) to reflect both of her parents' last names in her name in May 2020. Her previous legal name, Yang Wonyoung, had her dad's last name, Yang, but not her mom's last name, Yi, like most Koreans. However, she has been using "Yang Yi Wonyoung" as her name even before the court confirmed her name change, which is standard procedure for any type of name change. She is the first parliamentarian in Korea to have and use their name which has both of their parents' last names during their terms .

On 8 June 2021, Yang Yiwonyoung was kicked out of the Democratic Party for violating real estate and land speculation laws during the LH Scandal which rocked the ruling Democratic Party. If the Party rules that she is expelled, then she will be able to keep her seat as an independent lawmaker. However, if she voluntarily leaves the Party, then she will lose her seat as a lawmaker elected under proportional representation. Yang Yi maintains her innocence and is fully complying with a government audit.

Yang was readmitted to the Democratic Party on 8 October 2021 after being cleared of all charges.

== Electoral history ==
Election	Year	District	Party affiliation	Votes	Percentage of votes	Results
21st National Assembly General Election	2020	Proportional representation	Platform Party	9,307,112	33.3%	Won
