= Elected =

Elected may refer to:

- "Elected" (song), by Alice Cooper, 1973
- Elected (EP), by Ayreon, 2008
- The Elected, an American indie rock band

== See also ==
- Election
