= Kim Yong-min =

South Korean lawyer and politician (born 1976)

- 김용민

Member of the National Assembly
- Incumbent
- Assumed office 30 May 2020
- Preceded by: Ju Gwang-deok
- Constituency: Namyangju C (Gyeonggi)

Personal details
- Born: 5 June 1976 (age 50) Gangbuk, Seoul, South Korea
- Party: Democratic
- Education: Hanyang University; KAIST
- Occupation: Lawyer, politician

Kim Yong-min (Korean: 김용민, born 5 June 1976) is a South Korean lawyer and politician and, since 2020, the Member of the National Assembly for Namyangju 3rd constituency. He is one of the prominent pro-Cho Kuk MPs, along with Kim Nam-kuk and Choe Kang-wook.

== Early career ==
Born in Seoul, Kim attended Younghoon High School before majoring in law at Hanyang University. He also studied for a Master of Engineering at KAIST.

After qualifying for the bar in 2003, he had been working at the Korean Bar Association and for Lawyers for a Democratic Society (LDS), of which he was the deputy secretary-general. In 2013, he defended Naneun Ggomsuda sued for breaching the Public Official Election Act. He was also in charge of defending Yoo Woo-seong, a North Korean defector who was falsely accused as a spy. During the 2016 political scandal, Kim revealed that Ko Young-tae was unfairly examined by the prosecution. In 2018, he defended Chung Bong-ju, who was involved in a sexual harassment controversy.

== Political career ==
On 7 February 2020, Kim joined the Democratic Party, along with Kim Nam-kuk. Soon after, he became a potential candidate for Namyangju 3rd constituency that was held by Joo Kwang-deok. However, because he became the candidate without any preselections, other pre-candidates protested and some urged him to withdraw.

Following his confirmation as the Democratic candidate for Namyangju 3rd, Kim faced a challenge against the then MP Joo Kwang-deok, who was seeking re-election under the banner of the United Future Party (UFP). The competition was widely described as "Cho Kuk War", as Kim was a strong advocate of the former minister of justice, Cho Kuk, while Joo was a "sniper" against the former minister. In the election on 15 April, Kim defeated Joo with a margin of 4,286 votes.

On 16 April 2021, approximately a year after his election, Kim launched his bid for the party's vice presidency in the by-election on 2 May. He received 17.73% and was elected with the highest votes in an upset victory. The Maeil Business Newspaper said that the outcome was due to strong support from pro-Moon Jae-in members.

== Political views ==
A progressive figure, Kim is one of strong advocates of Cho Kuk, along with Kim Nam-kuk and Choe Kang-wook. He supports the prosecution reforms promoted by the Moon Jae-in government.

== Election results ==
Year	Elections	Constituency	Political party	Votes (%)	Remarks
2020	21st National Assembly General Election	Namyangju C (Gyeonggi)	Democratic	71,776 (50.07%)	Won
2024	22nd National Assembly General Election	Namyangju C (Gyeonggi)	Democratic	83,387 (54.58%)	Won
