= Kim Nam-kuk =

South Korean politician (born 1982)

- 김남국
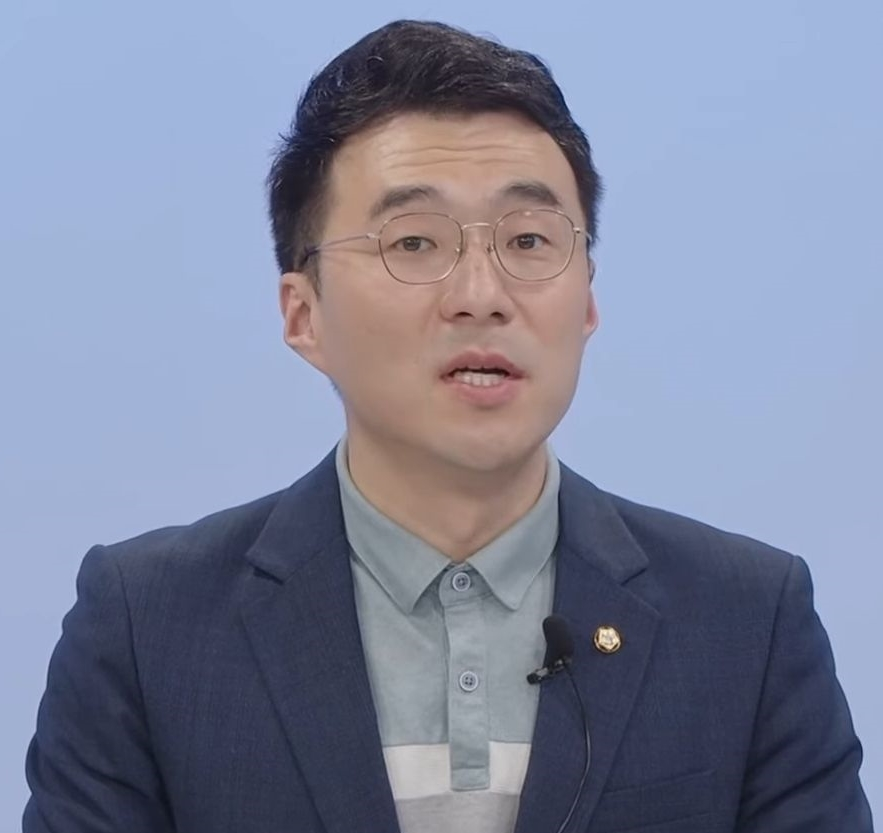

Member of the National Assembly
- In office 30 May 2020 – 29 May 2024
- Preceded by: Park Soon-ja
- Succeeded by: Kim hyun (Ansan B, Gyeonggi); Park Hae-cheol (Ansan C, Gyeonggi)
- Constituency: Ansan Danwon B (Gyeonggi)

Member of the National Assembly
- Incumbent
- Assumed office 4 June 2026
- Preceded by: Yang Moon-seok
- Constituency: Ansan A (Gyeonggi)

Digital Communication Secretary to the President
- In office 1 May 2025 – 4 December 2025

Personal details
- Born: 22 October 1982 (age 44) Gwangju, South Korea
- Party: Democratic (2024–2025, 2025–); Democratic Alliance of Korea (2024); Independent (2023–2024, 2025); Democratic (2015–2023); New Politics Alliance for Democracy (2015)
- Education: Chung-Ang University; Chonnam National University; Seoul National University
- Occupation: Lawyer, politician

Kim Nam-kuk (Korean: 김남국, born 22 October 1982) is a South Korean lawyer and politician. A person from Gwangju, he has currently been operating Lawyer Kim Nam-kuk Legal Firm. He, also one of co-writers of White Paper on Cho Kuk, is widely known for his pro-Cho Kuk views.

== Education ==
Kim obtained his Bachelor of Public Administration degree from Chung-Ang University in 2008. He proceeded to postgraduate studies in law at Chonnam National University, being graduated in 2012. He had completed his doctoral programme in law at Seoul National University in 2016.

== Career ==
Following the death of the former President Roh Moo-hyun, Kim began his lawyer career in order to fight against the prosecution, as he believed the former President was victimised by the "absolute" prosecution's investigation. He was a member of the Committee for Juvenile Protection of the Ministry of Justice from 2012 to 2015 and was also a court-appointed assistant of Seoul Family Court from 2014 to 2016.

=== 2020 general election ===
On 7 February 2020, Kim was brought into the ruling Democratic Party along with Kim Yong-min. On 18 February, he declared to run for Gangseo 1st constituency at the upcoming general election and therefore he planned to formally announce his bid at the National Assembly Proceeding Hall. However, he suddenly cancelled the plan, somehow people suggested that he did flip-flop on his earlier decision. Soon, he posted on Facebook that he had confirmed to run for the election.

Gangseo 1st, where currently being held by Keum Tae-seop, who had criticised the former Justice Minister Cho Kuk. As Kim holds pro-Cho Kuk views, various newspapers often used the term "Cho vs Anti-Cho" should a preselection between 2 of them is carried out. Keum accused Kim for making the election as "defending the ex-Justice Minister". Kim then reacted that Keum was urging him to not stand for the election. On 21 February, the Democratic Party brought a decision to have a preselection that excludes Kim. Nevertheless, Keum lost to Kang Sun-woo, in which the result was regarded as "shocking". Kim, instead, was nominated to Ansan Danwon 2nd.

== Controversies ==
=== Sexist Podcast ===
On 13 April 2020, Park Soon-ja, the MP for Ansan Danwon 2nd as well as one of the competitors to Kim, has revealed a record of a 18+ podcast where Kim used to appear from January to February 2019. From the record, some guests were speaking offensive words, such as "Have you ever fxxk with your husband at his home?", "suck your mum's dxxk", "such a big boob like head", "Criollos are damn good" and so on, though all of these were never mentioned by Kim himself. Park, did not just condemn Kim, but the entire Democratic Party for "not having a proper mind in sex issues". She then urged him to resign his candidacy as soon as possible, as well as his party to sincerely apologise. The Justice Party also harshly denounced and advised him to make an apology. Chin Jung-kwon, also accused him by connecting with Nth room case. Kim then revealed, "I was not an emcee; I just attended as a guest because I'm not good in love. But it was so helpless and too offensive. That's why I quit." He also added that Park was connecting the controversy to the Nth room case in order to "overturn the situation". In the end, he expressed his regret.

The next day, he was sued by a civic organization for breaching the Information and Communications Network Act.

=== Gay dating app controversy ===
On 19 October 2022, Kim Nam-kuk stirred public controversy when parliamentary livestream cameras caught a notification alarm for a gay dating app on his personal cellphone. Kim's office strongly denied that the Member of Parliament was outed as a homosexual, but rather Kim was researching the app after hearing about it from a friend. Also, cellphones are not permitted to be used during parliamentary sessions in the chamber hall.

=== Cryptocurrency controversy ===
On 14 May 2023, Kim left the Democratic Party after allegations of using and selling cryptocurrencies while Parliament was in session. Kim was reported in possession of 1.5 billion won (US$1,117,310) worth of cryptocurrencies that he acquired while a member of Parliament. He has cooperated in the investigations.

=== Corruption and Favoritism controversy ===
On 1 May 2025, it was announced that Kim would be appointed as incoming President Lee Jae-Myung's Digital Communications Secretary. Kim resigned on 4 December 2025 after a personal chatroom between him and Cheonan Member of Parliament, Moon Jin-seok, leaked. Kim and Moon, who went to the same university, became in the spotlight when media outlets captured Democratic Party lawmaker Moon Jin-seok asking Secretary Kim via mobile phone messenger to recommend a specific university graduate to the president of the Korea Automobile Manufacturers Association. Secretary Kim's response, "I will recommend you to older brother Hoon-sik and older sister Hyun-ji," was also captured, sparking controversy.

== Election results ==
Year	Elections	Constituency	Political party	Votes (%)	Remarks
2020	21st National Assembly General Election	Ansan Danwon B (Gyeonggi)	Democratic	42,150 (51.32%)	Won
2026	2026 By-election	Ansan A (Gyeonggi)	Democratic	50,969 (55.45%)	Won
