= Choi Hye-young =

South Korean politician

- 최혜영

Head of Public Relations
- In office 7 August 2025 – February 2026
- President: Lee Jae Myung
- Prime Minister: Kim Min-seok
- Preceded by: Kim Soo-hye

Member of the National Assembly
- In office 30 May 2020 – 30 May 2024
- Constituency: Proportional

Personal details
- Born: 1 June 1979 (age 47) Busan, South Korea
- Party: Democratic (2019–2020; 2020-)
- Other political affiliations: Platform (2020)
- Education: Silla University; Seoul Women's University; Korea Nazarene University
- Occupation: Educator, politician

Choi Hye-young (Korean: 최혜영, born 1 June 1979) is a South Korean educator and politician served as the Member of the National Assembly from 2020 until 2024.

== Life ==
Initially having a dream as a ballerina, she changed her mind after an unfortunate accident left her a quadriplegic in 2003. Since then, she brought a decision to be an educator could improve the awareness of disability. In 2009, she established Korea Education Centre for Disabilities Awareness. Currently, she is a professor of the Department of Social Welfare and Administration at Gangdong University.

She holds a bachelor's degree in dance at Silla University. She attained a master's degree in social welfare at Seoul Women's University in 2010. In 2017, she also received a doctorate in rehabilitation welfare at Korea Nazarene University, made her to be the first disabled woman with spinal cord injury to receive the doctorate.

She married Chung Nak-hyun, an ex-swimmer who has also been having a quadriplegia following his diving accident. He then became a rugby player and received a silver medal in the 2014 Asian Para Games.

== Politics ==
On 26 December 2019, Choi was brought to the ruling Democratic Party of Korea (DPK) by its President Lee Hae-chan. During an interview with Kim Hyun-jung's News Show of CBS, she revealed that she joined politics after her saw the main opposition Liberty Korea Party (LKP)'s intention to oppose the 3 Kindergarten Acts, in which she thought the LKP is impossible to fight for disabled rights. She also added if she is elected to the National Assembly, she will fight for disabled female rights.

On 14 March 2020, the DPK had revealed its proportional list for the upcoming election, in which Choi would contest the party's 1st list. After the party had joined the Platform Party, a satellite party to the DPK and an electoral alliance including DPK and other minor left-of-centre parties, Choi contested the alliance's 11th list; the DPK candidates start from 11th.

In July 2025 she was appointed as Head of Public Relations in the Lee Jae-myung government and took the office on 7 August. In February 2026, she resigned from the role.

== Controversies ==
On 24 February 2020, sources reported that though both Choi and Chung had married in 2011 but the registration was done in 2019. The sources also revealed that therefore, Chung was unfairly taking benefits by delaying the marriage registration. Choi denied they were unfairly enjoying benefits.

Choi was also reported that she was formerly fined a million won (≒ US$1,000) for driving without a licence.

== Election results ==
=== General elections ===
| Year | Constituency | Political party | Votes (%) | Remarks |
|---|---|---|---|---|
| 2020 | PR (11th) | Platform Party (Note: Choi is the 1st list of the Democratic Party but ran under the Platform Party banner. According to the Platform Party list, all Democratic members start from 11th list. As the Platform Party was merged into the Democratic Party on 13 May 2020, most of its MPs automatically became the Democratic members.) | 9,307,112 (33.35%) | Elected |
