= Kim Ye-ji (politician) =

South Korean politician and pianist (born 1980)

- 김예지
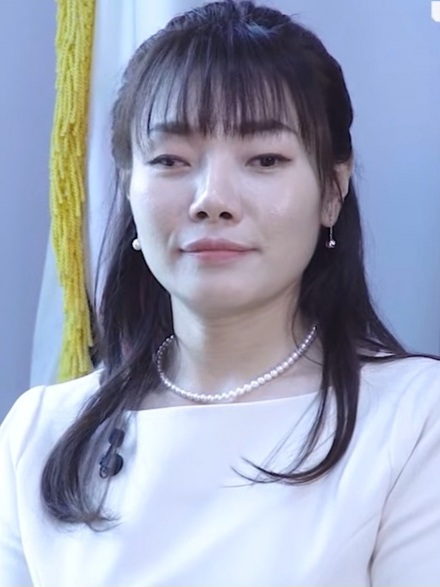

Member of the National Assembly
- Incumbent
- Assumed office May 30, 2020
- Constituency: Proportional representation

Personal details
- Born: 13 December 1980 (age 45)
- Party: People Power Party (2020–2024; 2024–)
- Other political affiliations: Future Korea Party (2020); People Future Party (2024)
- Education: Seoul School for the Blind; Sookmyung Women's University (Piano Major); Doctor of Musical Arts (DMA) University of Wisconsin–Madison

Kim Ye-ji (Korean: 김예지, 13 December 1980) is a South Korean pianist and politician who is visually impaired. She is a member of the 21st and 22nd National Assemblies; she was elected as a proportional representation member in the 2020 South Korean legislative election and re-elected via proportional representation in the 2024 South Korean legislative election.

== Athletic activities ==
She competed in cycling at the 39th National Para Games in 2019. At the 17th National Para Winter Games in 2020, she won a silver medal in the women's 4km classic (B-blind) cross-country skiing and a bronze medal in the 4.5km sprint biathlon (B-blind).

== Education ==
- Graduated from Seoul School for the Blind.
- Graduated from Sookmyung Women's University (Piano Major).
- Doctor of Musical Arts (DMA) from the University of Wisconsin–Madison.

== History ==
In January 2016, she became a member of the Heart Chamber Orchestra, an orchestra for the visually impaired.

She later became a board member of the Korea Association of Artists with Disabilities.

Between March 2020 and April 2020, she served as a spokesperson for the Election Campaign Committee of the Future Korea Party. On 15 April 2020, she was elected to the 21st National Assembly as a proportional representation member. The Future Korea Party later merged into the United Future Party. After the election, she was appointed an advisor to the Committee on the Disabled for the People Power Party. In 2021, she was appointed as a deputy floor leader for the People Power Party.

On 9 August 2021, Kim joined Yoo Seong-min's presidential primary campaign. After Yoon Suk Yeol became the party candidate, she joined his campaign, taking responsibility for the disability sector.

In October 2023, Kim was appointed to the Supreme Council of the People Power Party. Later that year, she was appointed to be part of Han Dong-hoon's emergency response committee.

At the 2024 South Korean legislative election, she was re-elected as a proportional representation member for the People Future Party (as number fifteen). After the election, the People Future Party merged into the People Power Party.

Following the 2024 South Korean martial law crisis, she voted in favour of the Impeachment of Yoon Suk Yeol.

In 2025, she joined Han Dong-hoon's presidential campaign for the primary as chairperson of the Committee for Bridging Gaps.

=== Electoral history ===
Year	Election	National Assembly	Position	Constituency	Party	Votes	Vote share	List rank	Result
2020	General election	21st	Member of the National Assembly	Proportional representation	Future Korea Party	9,441,520	33.84%	Proportional representation No. 11	First term
2024	General election	22nd	Member of the National Assembly	Proportional representation	People Future Party	10,395,264	36.67%	Proportional representation No. 15	Re-elected

== See also ==
- List of members of the National Assembly (South Korea), 2020–2024
- List of members of the National Assembly (South Korea), 2024–2028
- Future Korea Party
- People Future Party
- Han Dong-hoon
