= Seo Young-kyo =

South Korean politician

- 서영교
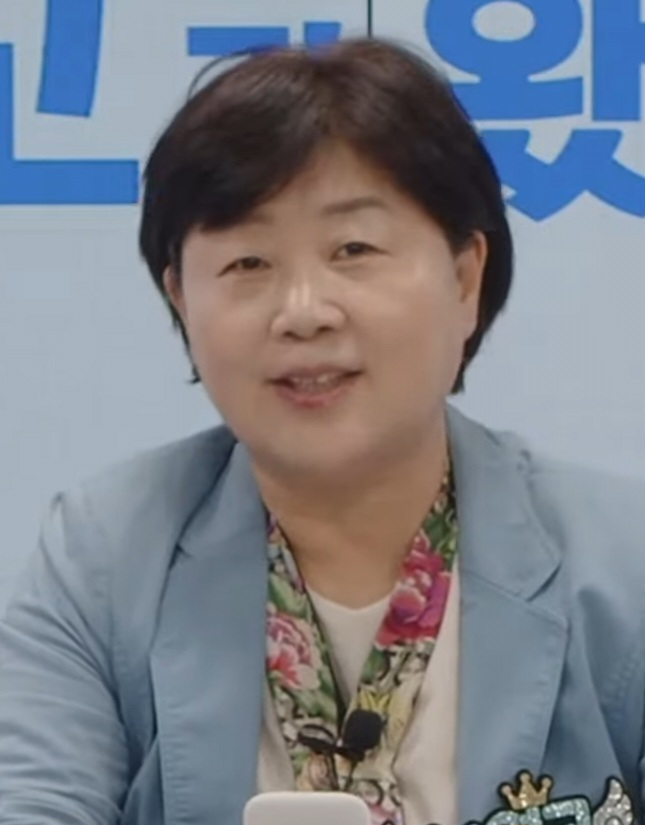

Member of the National Assembly
- Incumbent
- Assumed office 30 May 2012
- Preceded by: Yoo Jung-hyun
- Constituency: Seoul Jungnang A

Personal details
- Born: 11 November 1964 (age 62) Sangju, South Korea
- Party: Minjoo Party of Korea
- Education: Ewha Womans University
- Occupation: Political scientist

Korean name
- Hangul: 서영교
- Hanja: 徐瑛敎
- RR: Seo Yeonggyo
- MR: Sŏ Yŏnggyo

Seo Young-kyo (Korean: 서영교; born 11 November 1964) is a South Korean academic and politician in the liberal Minjoo Party of Korea. She has been a member of the National Assembly for Jungnang A, Seoul, since 2012.

Seo is a member of the Assembly's Legislation and Judiciary Committee. She has supported greater protection for children against sexual abuse, and in October 2014 she released documents listing public complaints against judges, highlighting cases of bias and elitism in the judiciary. Following the expiration of a murder case involving a six-year-old boy who had been doused in sulfuric acid in 1999, in 2015 Seo led the drafting of legislation to abolish the statute of limitations on homicide, stating that "murderers might enjoy a time limit for their crimes, but the pain of the victims of the crimes never has a limit".

A 2013 Dong-A Ilbo analysis of the 19th National Assembly stated that Seo was the lawmaker responsible for the highest number of "nasty" comments in the Assembly. In February–March 2016, she participated in a world-record filibuster against a government anti-terrorism bill. The filibuster lasted over 190 hours, but was ultimately unsuccessful in preventing the bill from being passed.

Born in 1964 in Sangju, North Gyeongsang, Seo studied political science and international relations at Ewha Womans University as an undergraduate, and went on to receive an MA in public administration and PhD in East Asian studies from the same university. She later became an associate professor at the Graduate School of Communication and Information at Dongguk University.

== Electoral history ==
Election	Year	District	Party affiliation	Votes	Percentage of votes	Results
19th National Assembly General Election	2012	Seoul Jungnang A	Democratic United Party	33,891	40.91%	Won
20th National Assembly General Election	2016	Seoul Jungnang A	Democratic Party	45,838	54.15%	Won
21st National Assembly General Election	2020	Seoul Jungnang A	Democratic Party	55,185	57.76%	Won
22nd National Assembly General Election	2024	Seoul Jungnang A	Democratic Party	60,881	61.92%	Won
