= Elections in South Korea =

Elections in South Korea are held on a national level to select the President and the National Assembly. Local elections are held every four years to elect governors, metropolitan mayors, municipal mayors, and provincial and municipal legislatures.

The president is directly elected for a single five-year term by plurality vote. The National Assembly has 300 members elected for a four-year term, 254 in single-seat constituencies and 46 members by proportional representation. Each individual party willing to represent its policies in the National Assembly is qualified on the legislative (general) election if: i) the national party-vote reaches over 3% on proportional contest or ii) more than 5 members of the party are elected from each of their first-past-the-post election constituencies.

== Voting ==
=== Eligibility ===
All citizens over the age of 18 have the right to vote. According to Article 34 of the 'Immigration Control Act,' a non-Korean citizen registered in the relevant local constituency and who has had a resident visa for at least three years has the right to vote in local elections.

=== Voting methods ===
Voting methods of South Korea
Office	Methods	Electoral district
President of South Korea	first-past-the-post	National
Member of the National Assembly	first-past-the-post	Constituencies and Party List
Metropolitan Mayor/Governor	first-past-the-post	Provinces
Member of the Metropolitan Council	first-past-the-post	Constituencies and Party List
Superintendent of Education	non-partisan first-past-the-post	Provinces
Municipal Mayor	first-past-the-post	Municipal divisions
Member of the Municipal Council	Single non-transferable vote	Constituencies and Party List

== Election technology ==
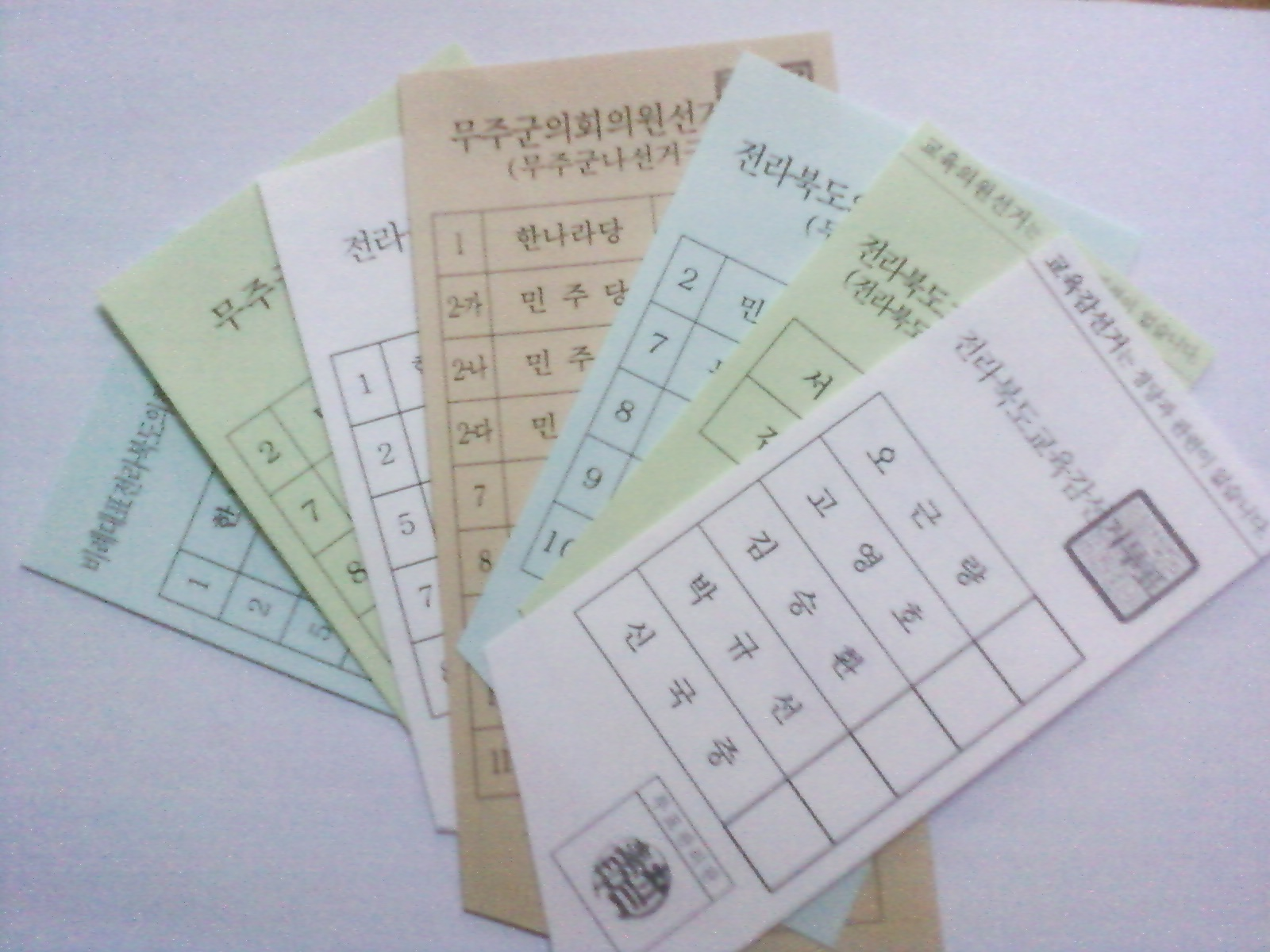
South Korean ballots from 2010 South Korean local elections.

Polling places are usually located in schools. During the absentee or early voting period, voters can vote at any place in the country. On election day, voters may only vote at polling places in their registered constituency. Korean voters mark paper ballots with a rubber stamp using red ink. There is one race per ballot paper; if there are multiple offices up for election, ballot papers are colour-coded and voters are issued one ballot per race.

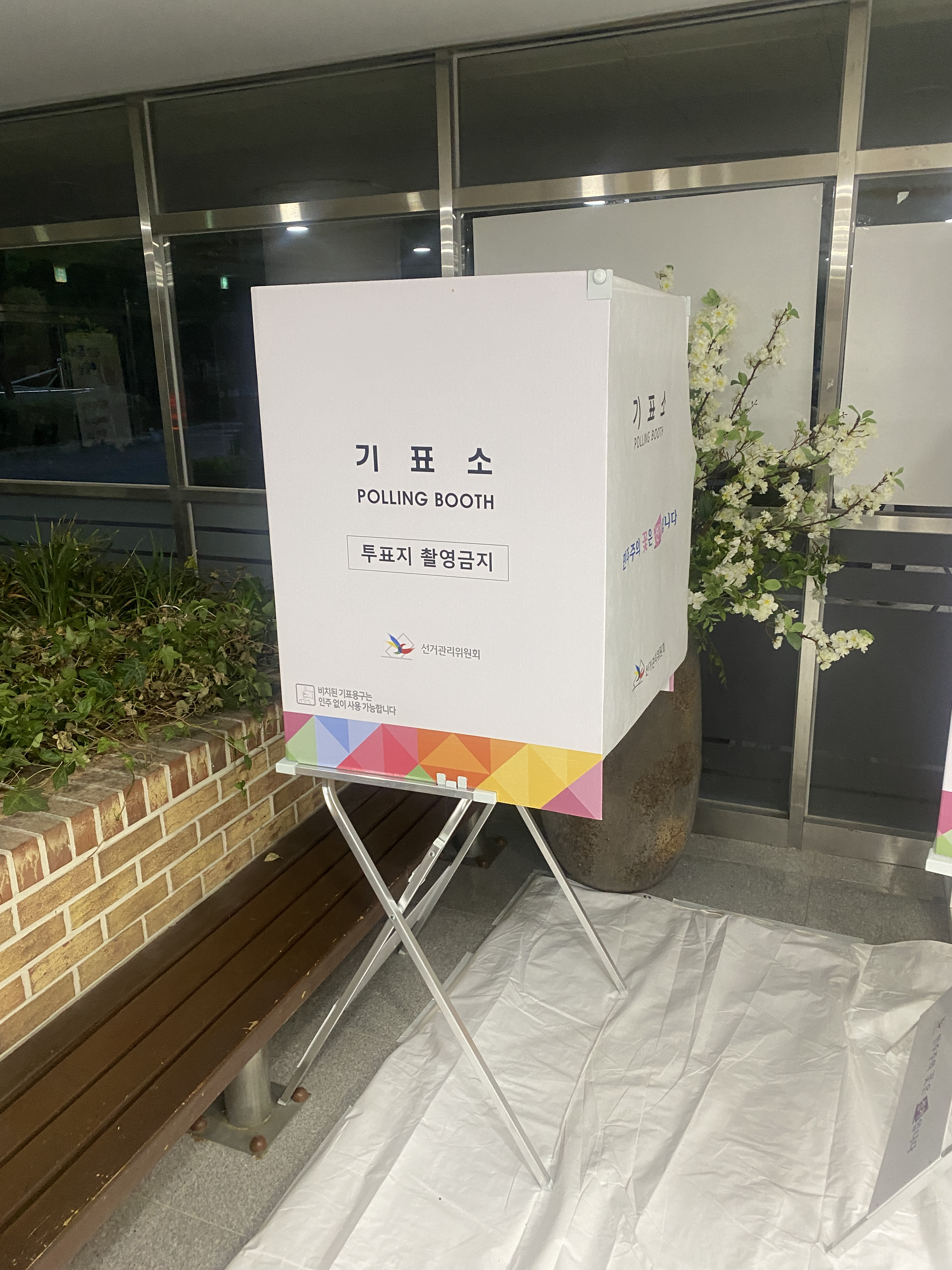
Polling booth, used in 2025 Presidential Election.

Korea uses a central count model. After the polls close, ballot boxes are sealed and transported to the constituency's counting centre. Traditionally ballots were hand-counted, and optical scanners have been adopted since 3rd local elections held on 13 June 2002. The scanners resemble cash sorter machines, sorting the ballots into stacks by how they are voted. Stacks are then counted using machines resembling currency counting machines.

Korean elections have been praised as a model of best practice. However, the legality of the introduction of optical scan technology has been challenged and there have been allegations of rigged counting, mainly by conservative citizens and candidates. Taking count of these concerns, the National Election Committee added the checking process by counting staffs from the 2024 South Korean legislative election.

== Schedule ==
=== Election ===
Position	2022	2023	2024	2025	2026	2027
Type	Presidential (March); Local (June)	None	National Assembly (April)	Presidential (June)	Local (June)	None
President	President	None		President	None	
National Assembly	None		All seats	None		
Provinces, cities and municipalities	All positions	None			All positions	None

=== Inauguration ===
Position	2022	2023	2024	2025	2026	2027
Type	Presidential (May); Local (July)	None	National Assembly (May)	Presidential (June)	Local (July)	None
President	May 10	None		June 4	None	None
National Assembly	None		May 30	None		
Provinces, cities and municipalities	July 1	None			July 1	None

== Latest elections ==
=== 2024 legislative election ===
Party or alliance		Proportional			Constituency			Total seats
Party or alliance		Votes	%	Seats	Votes	%	Seats	Total seats
People Power Party / People Future Party		10,395,264	36.67	18	13,179,769	45.08	90	108
Democratic Alliance	Democratic Party	7,567,459	26.70	8	14,758,083	50.48	161	169
Democratic Alliance	Progressive Party	7,567,459	26.70	2	302,925	1.04	1	3
Democratic Alliance	New Progressive Alliance (Note: Alliance of the Basic Income Party, the Social Democratic Party and the Open Democratic Party)	7,567,459	26.70	2	14,271	0.05	0	2
Democratic Alliance	Independents	7,567,459	26.70	2				2
Democratic Alliance	Total	7,567,459	26.70	14	15,075,279	51.57	162	176
Rebuilding Korea Party		6,874,278	24.25	12				12
Reform Party		1,025,775	3.62	2	195,147	0.67	1	3
Liberal Unification Party		642,433	2.27	0	18,700	0.06	0	0
Green–Justice Party		609,313	2.15	0	107,029	0.37	0	0
New Future Party		483,827	1.71	0	200,502	0.69	1	1
Pine Tree Party		124,369	0.44	0	18,939	0.06	0	0
Grand National Party		72,925	0.26	0				0
National Revolutionary Party		67,420	0.24	0				0
Saenuri Party		57,210	0.20	0				0
Liberal Democratic Party		39,977	0.14	0	1,245	0.00	0	0
Christian Party		36,117	0.13	0	218	0.00	0	0
Grand National Unity Party		30,323	0.11	0				0
Our Republican Party		29,895	0.11	0	12,814	0.04	0	0
Great Korea Party		29,481	0.10	0				0
Women's Party		28,942	0.10	0				0
Hashtag People's Policy Party		26,906	0.09	0				0
Labor Party		25,937	0.09	0	7,465	0.03	0	0
Financial Reform Party		20,548	0.07	0				0
Senior Welfare Party		15,178	0.05	0				0
Republican Party		14,912	0.05	0				0
Hongik Party		13,326	0.05	0				0
Korea's Farmer and Fisherman's Party		13,035	0.05	0	2,804	0.01	0	0
Korea People's Party		11,947	0.04	0	85	0.00	0	0
Mirae Party		11,505	0.04	0				0
New National Participation Party		10,242	0.04	0				0
To Tomorrow, to the Future		9,417	0.03	0	1,333	0.00	0	0
Republic of Korea Party		8,527	0.03	0				0
Unification Korea Party		8,518	0.03	0				0
Korea Party		7,820	0.03	0				0
Popular Democratic Party		7,663	0.03	0				0
Gihuminsaeng Party		6,615	0.02	0	778	0.00	0	0
Party for the Abolition of Special Privileges		4,707	0.02	0	54	0.00	0	0
Korean Wave Union Party		3,894	0.01	0				0
Korea Business Party		3,783	0.01	0				0
K-Political Innovation Union Party		3,451	0.01	0				0
New Korean Peninsula Party		1,580	0.01	0				0
Korean National Party					1,917	0.01	0	0
People's Democracy Party					290	0.00	0	0
Independents					409,761	1.40	0	0
Total		28,344,519	100.00	46	29,234,129	100.00	254	300
Valid votes		28,344,519	95.58		29,234,129	98.63		
Invalid/blank votes		1,309,931	4.42		406,790	1.37		
Total votes		29,654,450	100.00		29,640,919	100.00		
Registered voters/turnout		44,280,011	66.97		44,245,552	66.99		
Source: KBS, Daum, NEC

=== 2025 presidential election ===

Vote share by municipalities and provinces (inset)

Candidate	Party	Votes	%
Lee Jae Myung	Democratic Party	17,287,513	49.42
Kim Moon-soo	People Power Party	14,395,639	41.15
Lee Jun-seok	Reform Party	2,917,523	8.34
Kwon Yeong-guk	Democratic Labor Party	344,150	0.98
Song Jin-ho	Independent	35,791	0.10
Total		34,980,616	100.00
Valid votes		34,980,616	99.27
Invalid/blank votes		255,881	0.73
Total votes		35,236,497	100.00
Registered voters/turnout		44,391,871	79.38
Source: National Election Commission

=== By province and city ===
Province/City	Lee Jae Myung		Kim Moon-soo		Lee Jun-seok		Kwon Yeong-guk		Song Jin-ho	
Province/City	Votes	%	Votes	%	Votes	%	Votes	%	Votes	%
Seoul	3,105,459	47.13	2,738,405	41.56	655,346	9.95	83,900	1.27	5,998	0.09
Busan	895,213	40.14	1,146,238	51.40	168,473	7.55	18,189	0.82	2,099	0.09
Daegu	379,130	23.23	1,103,913	67.63	135,376	8.29	12,531	0.77	1,362	0.08
Incheon	1,044,295	51.68	776,952	38.45	176,739	8.75	20,743	1.03	2,098	0.10
Gwangju	844,682	84.77	79,937	8.02	62,104	6.23	8,767	0.88	934	0.09
Daejeon	470,321	48.51	393,549	40.59	94,724	9.77	9,905	1.02	1,109	0.11
Ulsan	315,820	42.54	353,180	47.57	63,177	8.51	9,299	1.25	899	0.12
Sejong	140,620	55.63	83,965	33.22	25,004	9.89	2,961	1.17	235	0.09
Gyeonggi	4,821,148	52.21	3,504,620	37.95	816,435	8.84	84,074	0.91	8,356	0.09
Gangwon	449,161	43.96	483,360	47.31	78,704	7.70	9,422	0.92	1,137	0.11
North Chungcheong	501,990	47.47	457,065	43.22	86,984	8.23	10,169	0.96	1,228	0.12
South Chungcheong	661,316	47.68	600,108	43.27	111,092	8.01	12,893	0.93	1,519	0.11
North Jeolla	1,023,272	82.65	134,996	10.90	67,961	5.49	10,061	0.81	1,719	0.14
South Jeolla	1,111,941	85.87	110,624	8.54	60,822	4.70	9,352	0.72	2,104	0.16
North Gyeongsang	442,683	25.53	1,159,594	66.87	116,094	6.69	13,884	0.80	1,788	0.10
South Gyeongsang	851,733	39.40	1,123,843	51.99	161,579	7.47	21,809	1.01	2,678	0.12
Jeju	228,729	54.77	145,290	34.79	36,909	8.84	6,191	1.48	528	0.13
Total	17,287,513	49.42	14,395,639	41.15	2,917,523	8.34	344,150	0.98	35,791	0.10
Source: National Election Commission

=== 2022 local elections ===
2022 South Korean local elections
- 1 June 2022

All 17 metropolitan mayors and governors All 226 municipal mayors All 824 seats for provincial and metropolitan councillors All 2926 seats for municipal councillors
- Turnout: 50.9% ▼9.3 pp
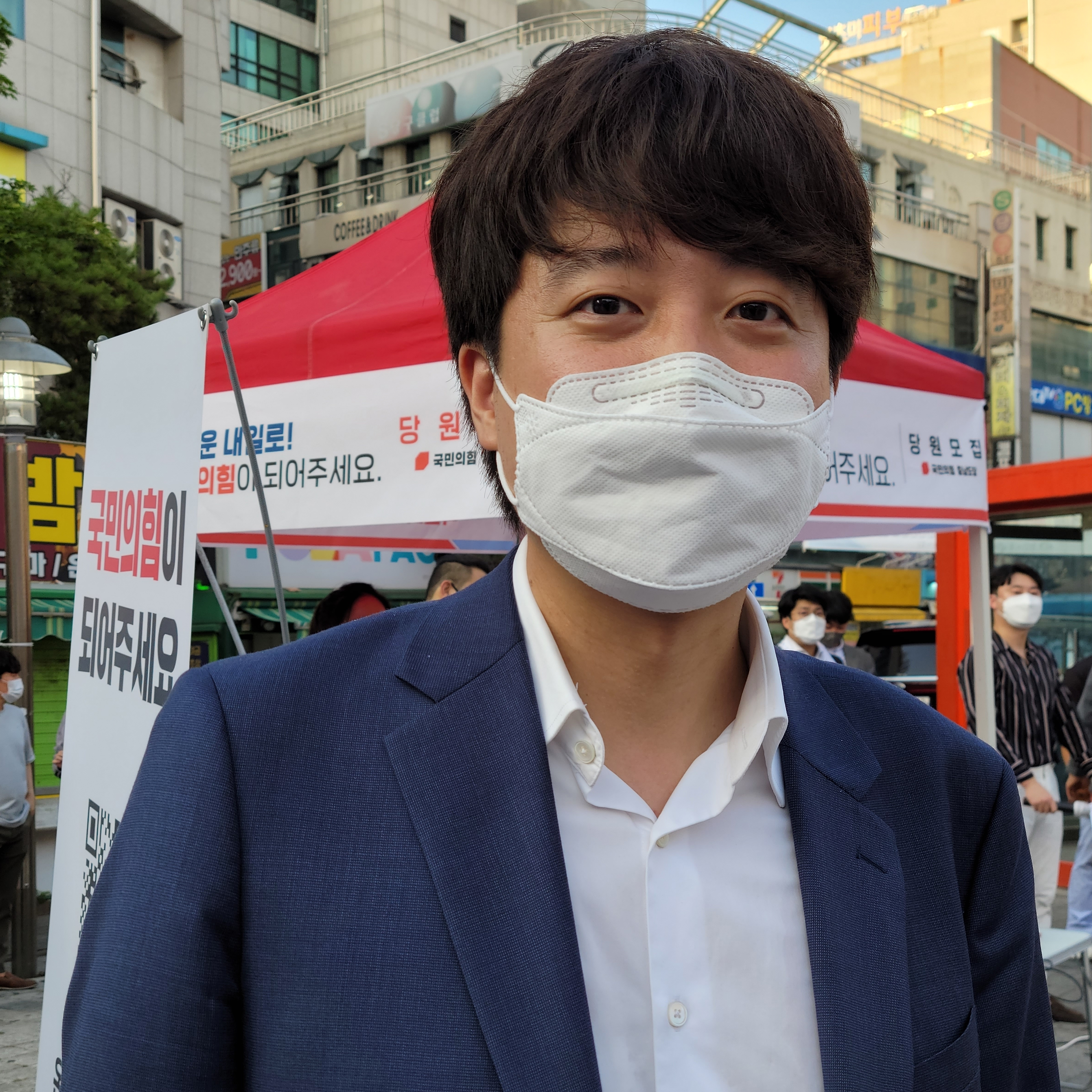

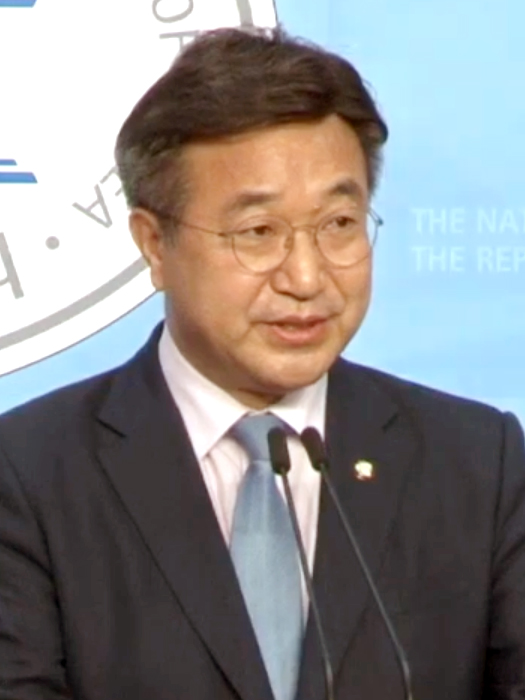

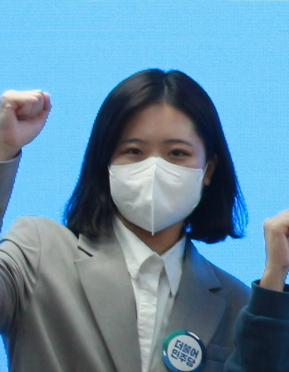

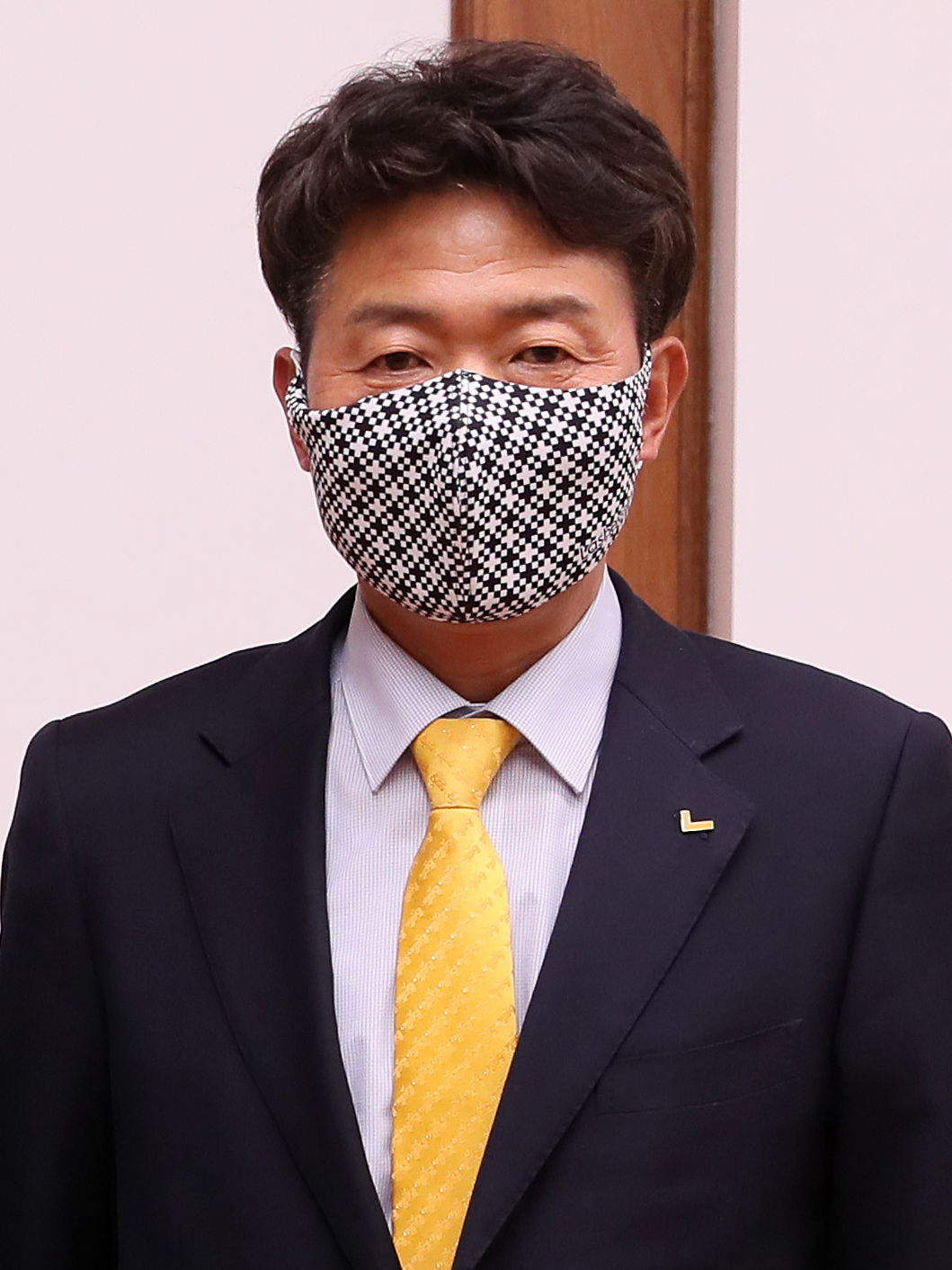
	First party	Second party
Leader	Lee Jun-seok	Yun Ho-jung & Park Ji-hyun
Party	People Power	Democratic
Regional offices	5 governors 7 met. mayors	4 governors 1 met. mayor
Regional offices +/–	▲4 governors ▲6 met. mayors	▼3 governors ▼6 met. mayors
Mayors	145	63
Mayors +/–	▲92	▼88
Councillors	540 (P); 1,435 (M)	322 (P); 1,384 (M)
Councillors +/–	▲403 (P) ▲426 (M)	▼330 (P) ▼255 (M)
	Third party	Fourth party
Leader	Kim Jae-yeon	Yeo Yeong-gug
Party	Progressive	Justice
Regional offices	0 governor 0 met. mayor	0 governor 0 met. mayor
Regional offices +/–	0	0
Mayors	1	0
Mayors +/–	▲1	0
Councillors	3 (P); 17 (M)	2 (P); 7 (M)
Councillors +/–	▲3 (P) ▲6 (M)	▼9 (P) ▼19 (M)

== Summary of past elections ==
=== Local elections ===
- 1995 South Korean local elections
- 1998 South Korean local elections
- 2002 South Korean local elections
- 2006 South Korean local elections
- 2010 South Korean local elections
- 2014 South Korean local elections
- 2018 South Korean local elections
- 2022 South Korean local elections

== See also ==
- History of South Korea
- Constitution of South Korea
- Electoral calendar
- Electoral system
