= 2022 South Korean presidential election =

- 9 March 2022
- Opinion polls
- Registered: 44,197,692
- Turnout: 77.08% (▼0.15pp)
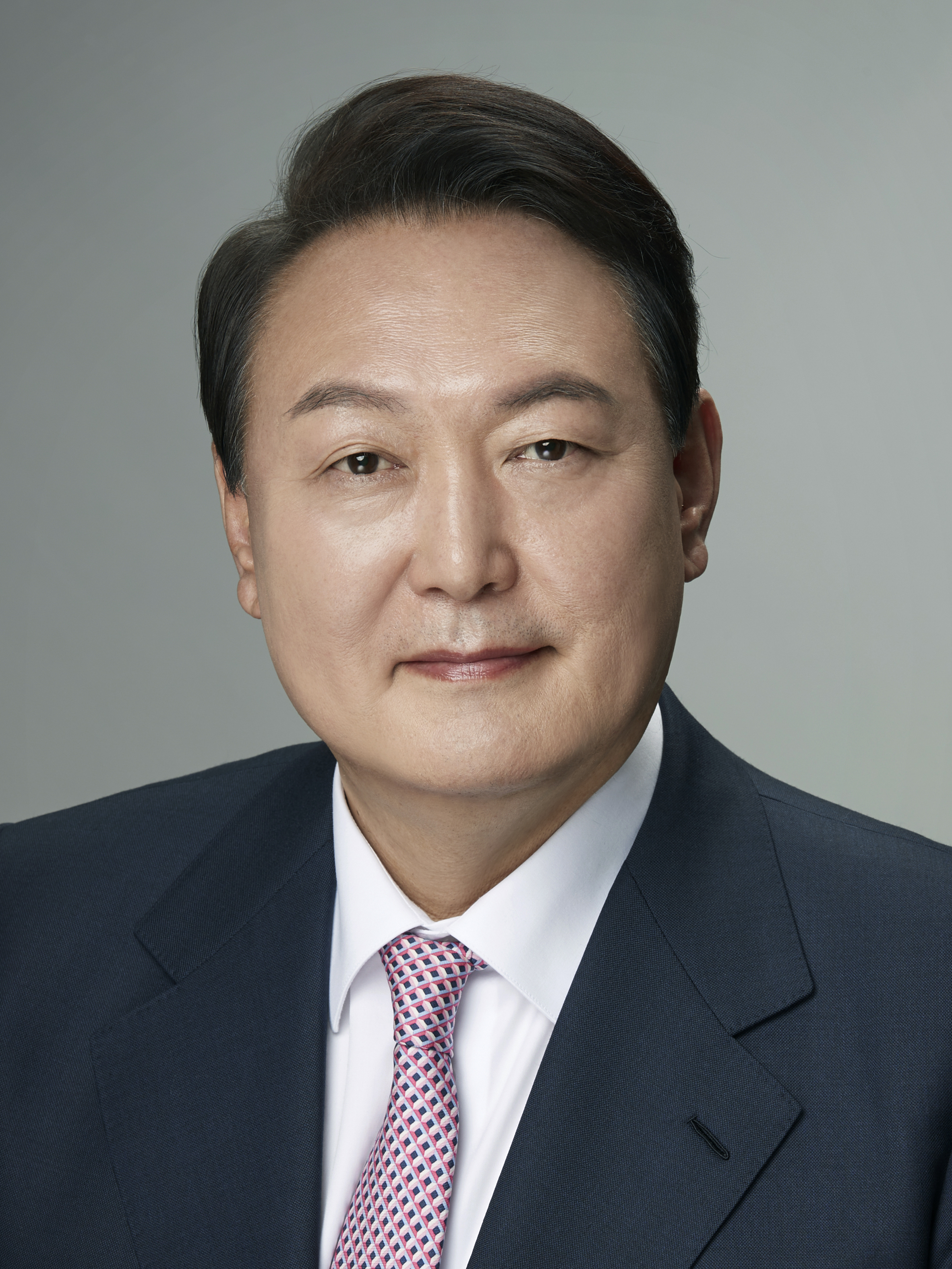

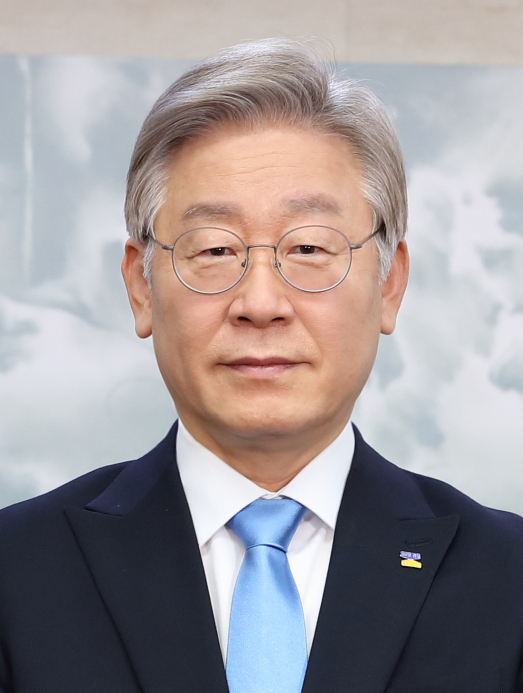
Nominee	Yoon Suk Yeol	Lee Jae Myung
Party	People Power	Democratic
Popular vote	16,394,815	16,147,738
Percentage	48.56%	47.83%
President before election
Moon Jae-in
Democratic
Elected President
Yoon Suk Yeol
People Power

Presidential elections were held in South Korea on 9 March 2022. Under the South Korean constitution, presidents are restricted to a single five-year term, meaning that incumbent president Moon Jae-in was ineligible to run for a second term. Opposition candidate Yoon Suk Yeol of the People Power Party won the election, defeating candidate Lee Jae Myung of the incumbent Democratic Party.

Both main parties had unusually intense primary elections. Upon its nomination of Lee Jae Myung, the second-place Democratic Party candidate Lee Nak-yon called for an appeal of the results, until being forced to concede. In the PPP, frontrunner Yoon and party chairman Lee Jun-seok frequently clashed over Yoon's performance and perceived apathy towards debates with other candidates. The People Party nominated Ahn Cheol-soo and the Justice Party nominated Sim Sang-jung.

Economic inequality, recovery from the ongoing COVID-19 pandemic, antifeminist sentiment, and housing issues were prominent topics during the election. Analysts observed increased political polarization, record low popularity amongst the candidates, infighting within both main political parties, as well as a negative or divisive tone throughout campaigning. After discussing a potential merger for some time, Ahn withdrew his campaign on 3 March, six days before the election, and endorsed Yoon.

In the closest presidential election in South Korean history, Yoon won the most overall votes and the key area of Seoul, but lost in Gyeonggi Province and Incheon. In addition, this was the country's first-ever direct presidential election in which the national winner failed to secure Jeju Province, a traditional bellwether region.

In 2025, following Yoon's impeachment and removal from office, Lee would go on to succeed him as president following a successful bid for the presidency in the 2025 presidential election.

== Background ==
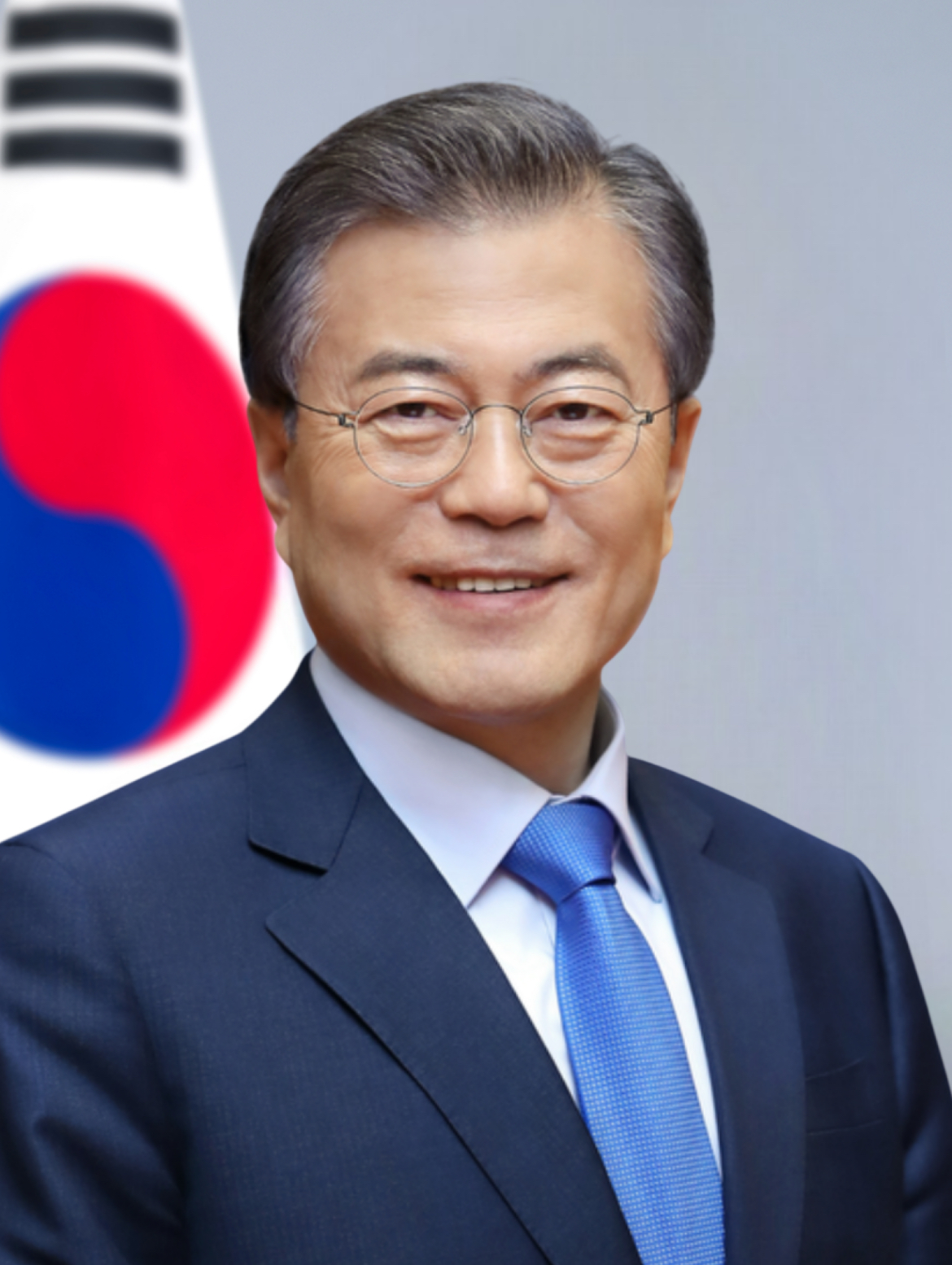
The incumbent in 2022, Moon Jae-in. His term expired on 10 May.

Following a 2016 political scandal that led to the impeachment of President Park Geun-hye, snap elections were called for 2017. Moon Jae-in of the Democratic Party defeated Hong Joon-pyo of the Liberty Korea Party and Ahn Cheol-soo of the People Party by a wide margin in the May 2017 election, bringing the Democrats back to power after nine years. After three years in office, Moon's position was strengthened by his party's victory in the 2020 legislative election, which gave them an absolute majority of 180 out of 300 seats in the National Assembly.

However, in the 2021 Seoul mayoral by-election, young voters in Seoul, who had traditionally sided with the Democratic Party, voted for the conservative People's Power Party (PPP) by large majorities: by a margin of 55.3 percent to 34.1 percent among voters in their 20s, and 56.5 percent to 38.7 percent among voters in their 30s. The incumbent administration was blamed for the housing crisis in Seoul which affected mostly younger citizens in their 20s and was rooted as the main cause of the Democrats' defeat, along with antifeminist sentiment among young male voters. The PPP elected 36-year-old Lee Jun-seok as their new party chief in June 2021. Lee's leadership campaign focused on young people and a big tent approach to the electorate, which was seen as a generational shift in South Korean politics. Lee had never held a public office. Several parties selected candidates for the presidential election who similarly lacked legislative or executive experience. Commentators observed that this reflected growing public distrust in South Korea's establishment politicians.

== Electoral system ==
The president of South Korea is elected by first-preference plurality (FPP), but with a two-party system and primary elections similar to those in the United States (sometimes called a partisan two-round system). The president serves a term of five years and cannot be re-elected.

== Nominations ==
=== Democratic Party ===
The Democratic Party (Korean: 더불어민주당) was the ruling political party of South Korea following its victories in the 2017 presidential election, 2018 local elections and the 2020 National Assembly election. The Democratic Party, while technically founded in 2014, is part of a lineage of parties that originated from the conservative 1955 Democratic Party. Parties in this lineage gradually shifted their ideology over the course of decades, and the 2022 Democratic Party is considered a big tent party comprising both centrist and liberal factions.

Politicians in this party generally support a social market economy with a strong social safety net, anti-corruption measures, direct democracy, and environmentalist policies. On matters of foreign policy, the party supports reconciliation and eventual reunification with North Korea. The party is particularly strong in Honam region. The incumbent president at the time, Moon Jae-in, was ineligible to run for reelection due to term limits.

==== Primary campaign ====
Former Prime Minister Lee Nak-yeon cemented his frontrunner status for both the Democratic Party's nomination and the general election by his victory in the crucial district of Jongno in the 2020 legislative election. Lee received wide support from President Moon Jae-in's faction of the party, evinced by his landslide victory in the party leadership contest of August 2020. However, Lee's January 2021 proposal to pardon former conservative presidents Park Geun-hye and Lee Myung-bak faced backlash. Gyeonggi Governor Lee Jae Myung, who ran a left-wing populist campaign for president in 2017 while Mayor of Seongnam, emerged as a popular alternative bolstered by a well-received response to the COVID-19 pandemic and his proposal for a universal basic income. Moon's second prime minister, Chung Sye-kyun, also resigned to run for the presidency.

The primary campaign saw clashes which became increasingly heated between Lee Nak-yeon and Lee Jae Myung.

==== Primary schedule and process ====
The nominating primaries were scheduled to be held in September 2021, although representatives of the Lee Nak-yon and Chung Sye-kyun campaigns called for the primaries to be delayed to November. The calls to delay the primary are seen to be attempts to prevent frontrunner Lee Jae Myung from getting the nomination, as he is the most preferred candidate among the public and the party.

On 25 June, the party's supreme council decided to hold the primary as scheduled by 10 September. The timetable for the process was as follows:

- 28 to 30 June – Registration of candidates
- 9 to 11 July – Preliminary primary involving a 50:50 survey of the general public and party members
- 11 July – announcement of the top six candidates eligible for the main primary
- Before 10 September – Announcement of primary result and party nominee

On 19 July, the party announced a delay in the final selection of candidates to mid-October due to an upsurge in COVID-19 cases in South Korea.

Following the completion of the nationwide primaries on 10 October 2021, Lee Jae Myung was announced as the party's candidate for president.

===== Primary results =====
Candidate	Votes	%
Lee Jae Myung	719,905	50.29
Lee Nak-yeon	560,392	39.14
Choo Mi-ae	129,035	9.01
Park Yong-jin	22,261	1.55
Total	1,431,593	100.00

The votes above only count the votes cast for the four candidates who stayed in the race up to the final round of the primary and do not include votes received by Chung Sye-kyun and Kim Doo-kwan, who both dropped out midway. Before dropping out, Chung had received 23,731 votes and Kim received 4,411 votes.

On 10 October, following the announcement of Lee Jae Myung's nomination, Lee Nak-yeon's campaign stated they would appeal the results. A day later, the campaign submitted a formal appeal to the party. Rep. Hong Young-pyo, co-chair of the Lee Nak-yeon campaign, said that the votes of Kim and Chung should be included in the final result, in which case Lee Jae Myung's vote share would be reduced to 49.32% and run-off would be required. However, party chairman Song Young-gil told reporters he would reject the appeal and urged the former prime minister to concede. Song added that the specific clause of excluding votes received by withdrawn candidates from the final tally was approved during the party convention of August 2020, when Lee Nak-yeon himself was elected party chairman.

On 13 October, the Party Affairs committee, with 64 of the 76 panel members attending, voted by acclamation to dismiss the appeal. Lee Nak-yeon formally conceded and vowed to do his part to ensure the party's victory in the March election.

==== Candidate ====
- Lee Jae Myung, Governor of Gyeonggi (2018–2021) and former Mayor of Seongnam (2010–2018) (Announced bid on 1 July, won nomination on 10 October)

1

Democratic Party Ticket
Lee Jae Myung
for President
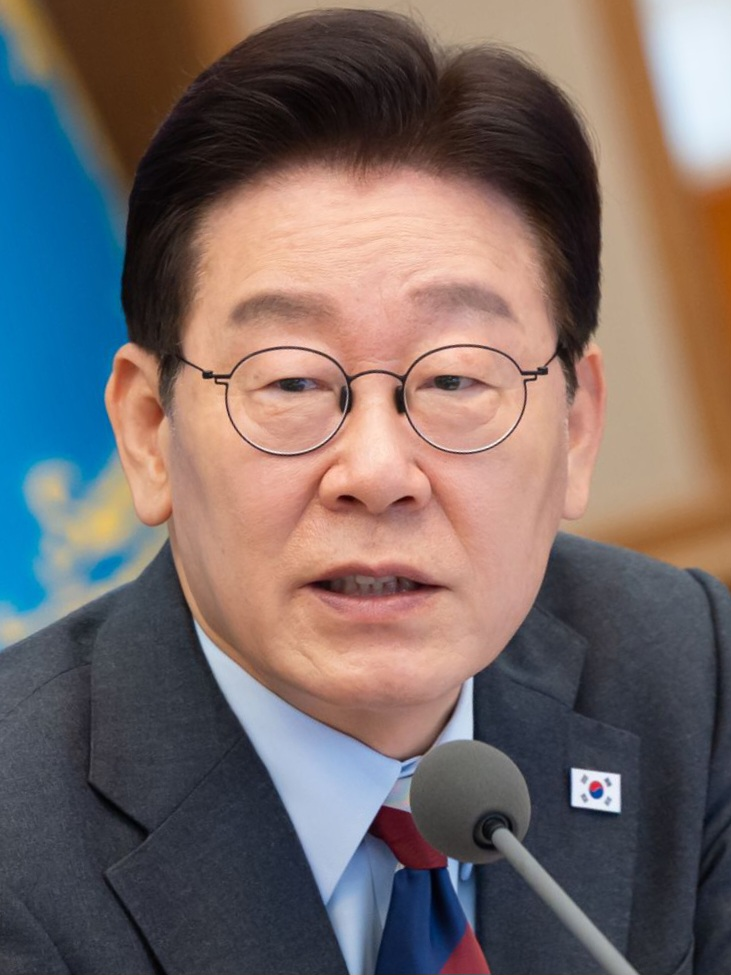
35th
Governor of Gyeonggi Province
(2018–2021)
Campaign

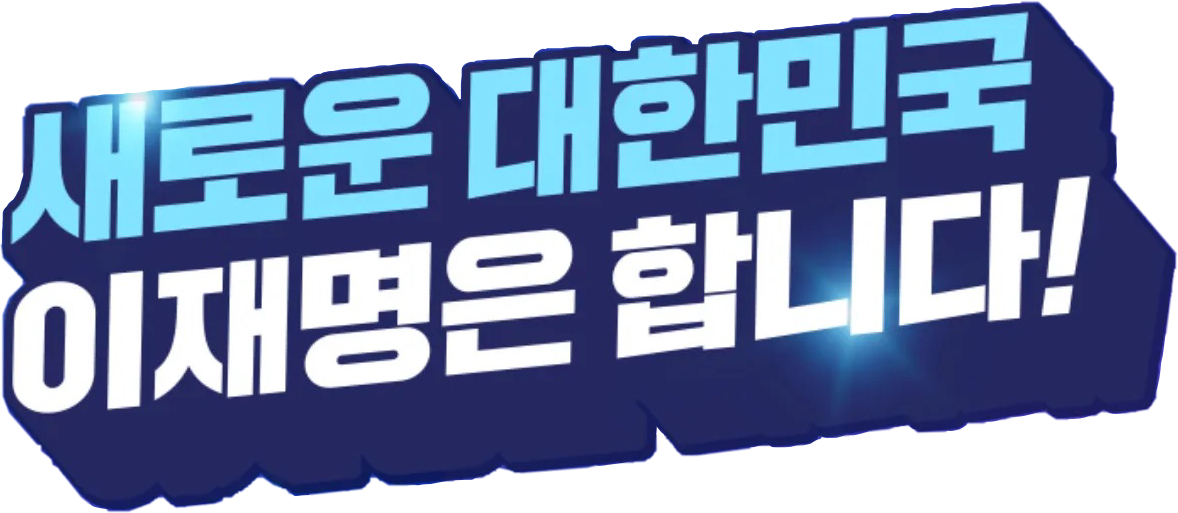

==== Other primary candidates ====
The following individuals were candidates for the Democratic Party primaries until the conclusion of the nomination process on 10 October, in the order of announcement of candidacy:

- Lee Nak-yon, former member of the National Assembly (2000–2014, 2020–2021), former Prime Minister (2017–2020), former Governor of South Jeolla (2014–2017) and former leader of the Democratic Party (South Korea, 2015) (2020–2021)
- Park Yong-jin, member of the National Assembly (2016–present)
- Choo Mi-ae, former Minister of Justice (2020–2021), former member of the National Assembly (1996–2004, 2008–2020) and former leader of the Democratic Party (South Korea, 2015) (2016–2018)
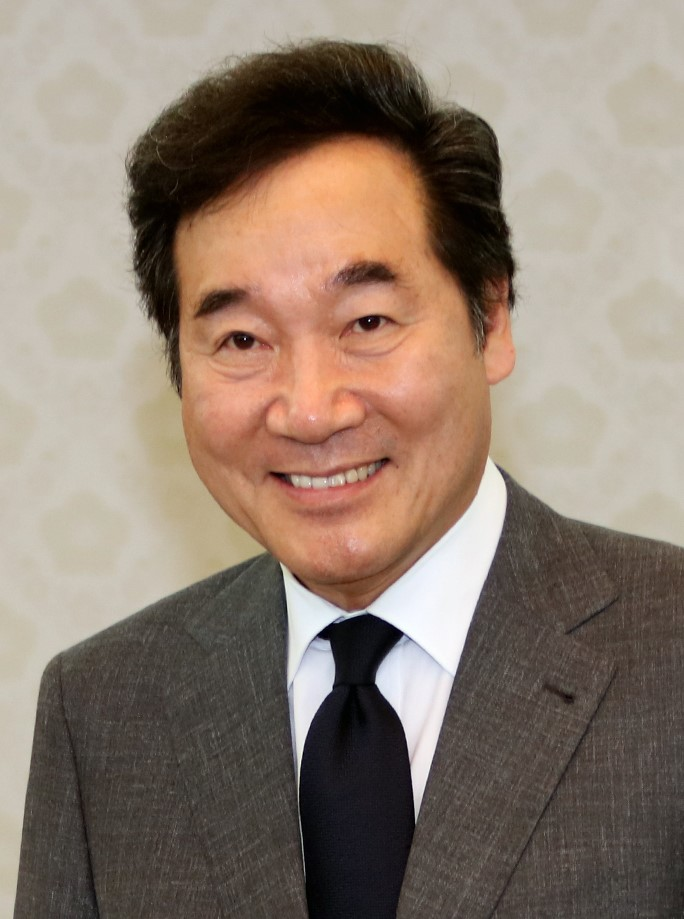
Lee Nak-yon (announced 5 July 2021)

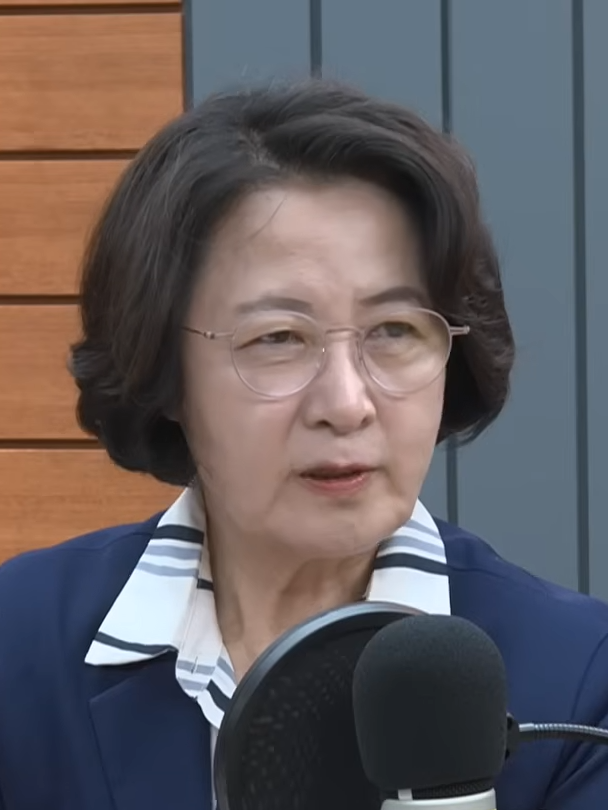
Choo Mi-ae (announced 20 June 2021)

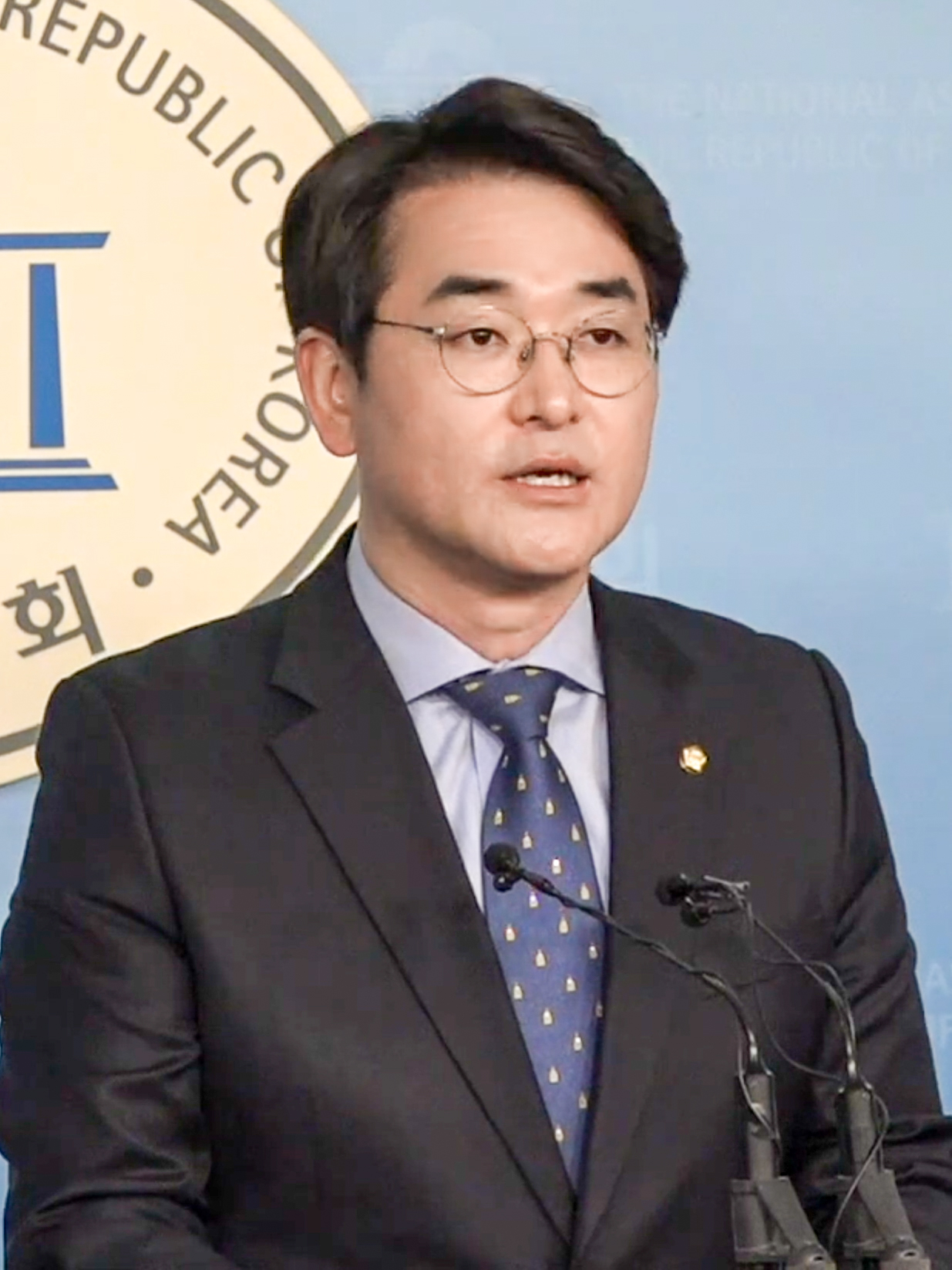
Park Yong-jin (announced 9 May 2021)

==== Eliminated candidates ====
On 11 July 2021, the Democratic Party (South Korea, 2015) narrowed its primary candidates down to six in the first round of the party primary. As a result, two candidates were eliminated.

- Yang Seung-jo, Governor of South Chungcheong (2018–present), former member of the National Assembly (2004–2018)
- Choi Moon-soon, Governor of Gangwon (2011–present), former member of the National Assembly (2008–2011)
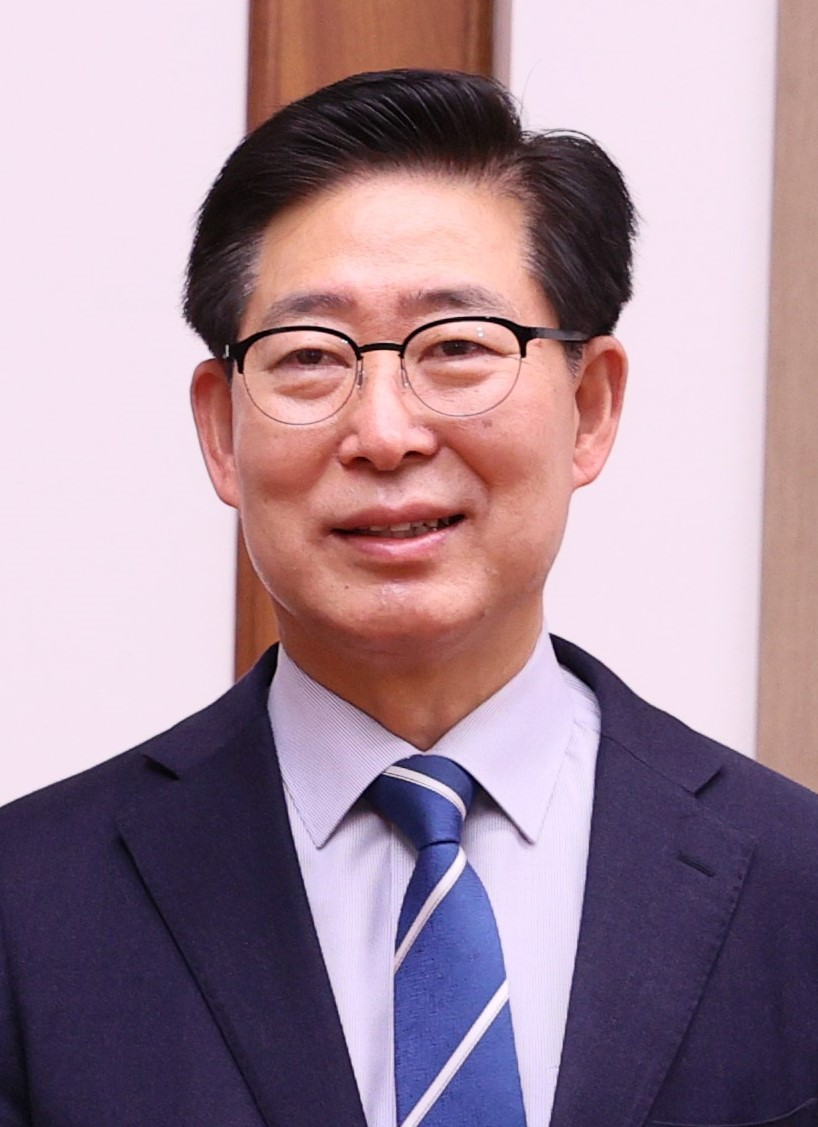
Yang Seung-jo (announced 12 May 2021)

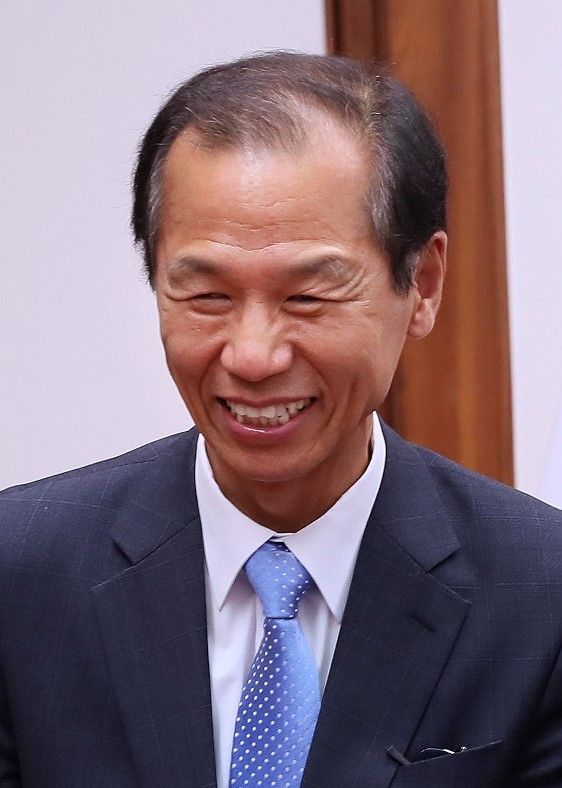
Choi Moon-soon (announced 1 June 2021)

==== Withdrawn candidates ====
- Lee Kwang-jae, member of the National Assembly (2004–2010, 2020–present), former Governor of Gangwon (2010–2011)(announced 27 May 2021, withdrew on 5 July and endorsed Chung Sye-kyun)
- Chung Sye-kyun, former Prime Minister (2020–2021), former Speaker of the National Assembly (2016–2018), former member of the National Assembly (2004–2020) (announced 17 June 2021, withdrew on 13 September)
- Kim Doo-kwan, member of the National Assembly (2016–present), former Mayor of Namhae (1995–2002), former Governor of South Gyeongsang (2010–2012), former Minister of Government Administration and Home Affairs (2003) (announced candidacy 1 July 2021, withdrew on 26 September and endorsed Lee Jae Myung)
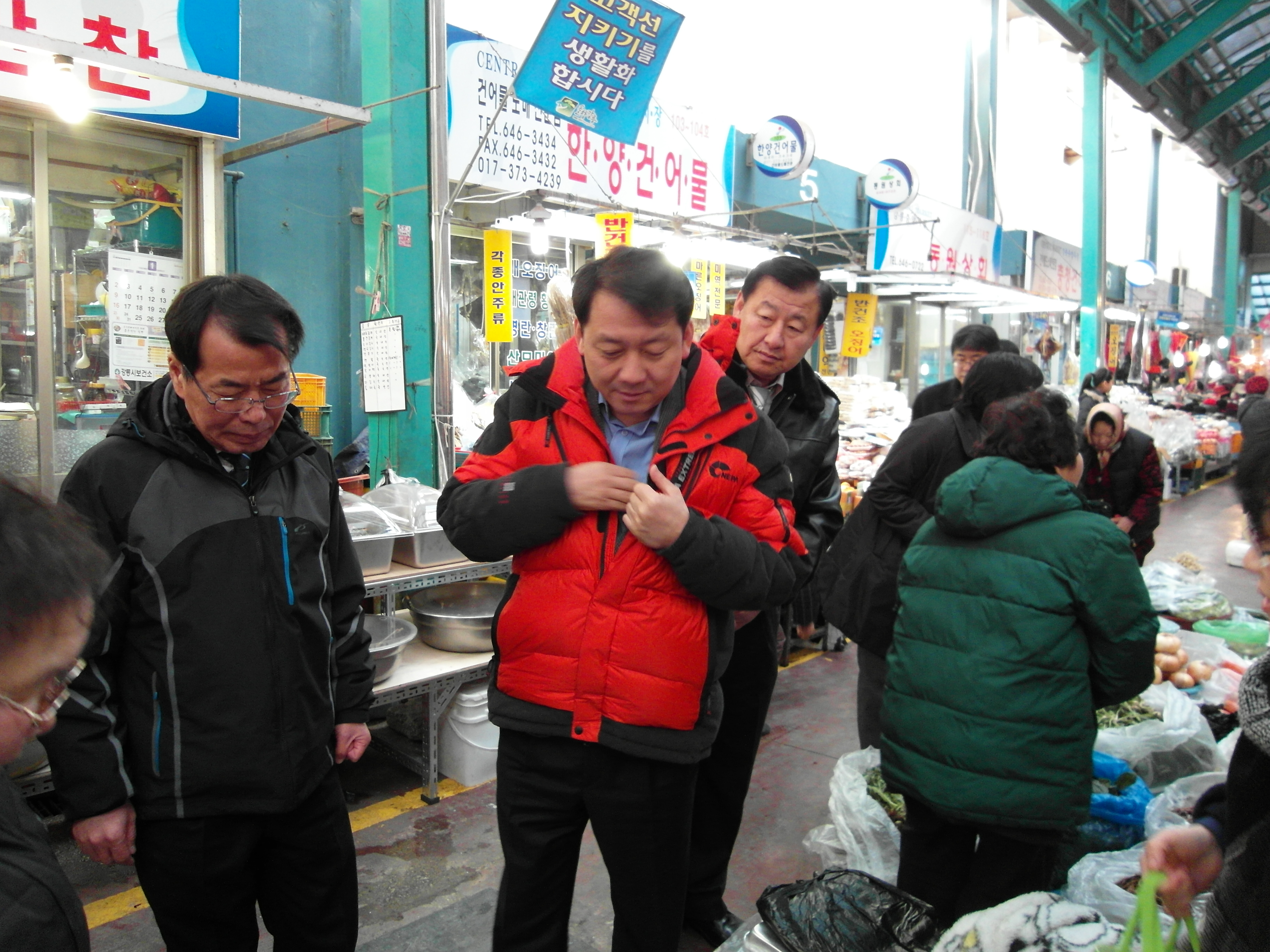
Lee Kwang-jae

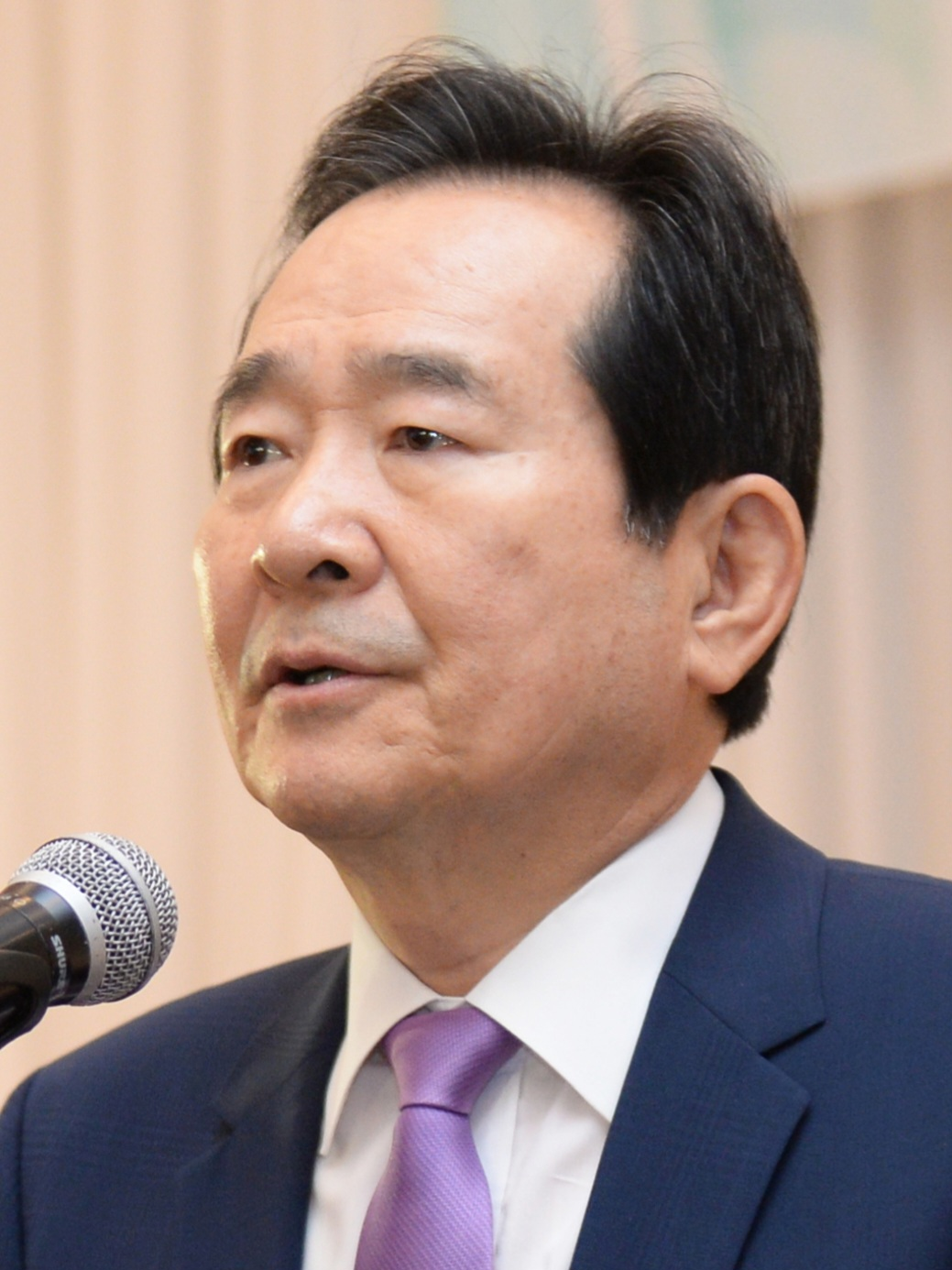
Chung Sye-kyun

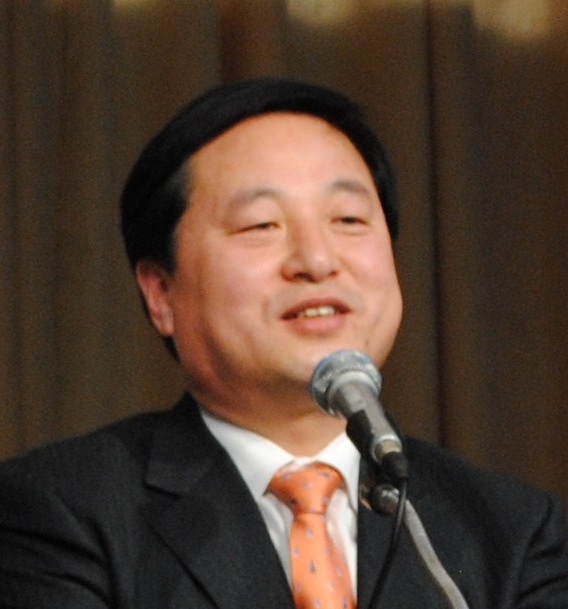
Kim Doo-kwan

=== People Power Party ===
The People Power Party (국민의힘) is the current iteration of a long line of Korean conservative parties that, throughout modern Korean history, rivaled the long line of parties in the Democratic Party lineage. The party was formally established in 2020 following a merger of multiple conservative parties created in the fallout of the 2016 South Korean corruption scandal that led to the fall of conservative president Park Geun-hye and her Saenuri Party. In the 2017 presidential election, the party's legal predecessor nominated right-wing populist Hong Jun-pyo, who went on to lose the election to liberal Moon Jae-in.

The party lost further ground in the 2020 National Assembly election. However, the party has since regained ground after retaking the mayor's offices of Seoul and Busan in the 2021 South Korean by-elections. On matters of policy, politicians in this party generally support liberal economic policies (including support for chaebols, the industrial conglomerates that dominate the South Korean economy) and hold conservative positions on national security, including hawkish stances on North Korea. The party is particularly strong in the southeastern Gyeongsang region.

Under new party chairman Lee Jun-seok's plans for a 'big tent' approach for the party's appeal to the electorate and desire to unify opposition forces against the Democratic Party, up to 14 individuals have declared or expressed interest in running for the PPP nomination. Another opposition candidate, Ahn Cheol-soo is not a member of the PPP.

==== Primary campaign ====
Yoon Suk Yeol, was seen as the frontrunner for the party's nomination since early 2020 despite not initially being a member of the party. Yoon led a January 2021 opinion poll as the most favored presidential candidate at 30.4 percent, over the ruling Democratic Party's Lee Jae Myung and Lee Nak-yeon. Yoon had expressed interest in joining the party, but had also not ruled out the possibility of creating his own party and then forging an electoral alliance with the PPP afterwards. After officially declaring his candidacy on 29 June 2021, Yoon officially joined the PPP on 30 July.

At one point, former Prime Minister Hwang Kyo-ahn, a longtime prosecutor who entered politics as Minister of Justice and later became acting President of South Korea following Park Geun-hye's removal from office, was briefly seen as the most likely right-wing candidate for the 2022 presidential election during a period in 2019. However, his high-profile defeat in the 2020 South Korean legislative election in the crucial Jongno district by Democratic 2022 presidential candidate and former Prime Minister Lee Nak-yeon obliterated his standing in national polling.

Representative Hong Jun-pyo, the conservative opponent of Moon in 2017, sought the PPP nomination again for 2022, coming in a close second place.

Former National Assembly member Yoo Seong-min, one of the most prominent conservative opponents of Park Geun-hye and a co-founder of the breakaway Bareun Party in 2016, announced his candidacy in May 2020.

Choi Jae-hyung, former Chairman of the Board of Audit and Inspection, joined the party on 15 July 2021. On 26 July, Choi officially registered his candidacy with the National Election Commission. On 30 July, upon frontrunner Yoon Suk Yeol's entrance into the People Power Party, Choi personally welcomed Yoon in a small COVID-19-aware media ceremony.

Chang Sŏng-min, former aide to president Kim Dae-jung and former member of the National Assembly (2000–2002) joined PPP on 2 August and announced his candidacy on 15 August 2021.

In August 2021, the primary campaign was marked by clashes between party chairman Lee and frontrunner Yoon. Yoon was accused of snubbing planned debates between the primary contenders mooted by Lee and the party leadership as Yoon was allegedly unprepared for debate questioning, including scandals involving his family and lacking broad knowledge on various social issues, as evidenced by gaffes made during the campaign. Yoon attacked Lee, calling him "self-righteous" while Lee hit back and said Yoon was uncooperative with the party leadership. In addition, Lee was also accused of being partial and taking sides, regarded as unbecoming of a party chairman's role. Other PPP candidates waded into the issue and criticised Yoon.

Yoon was charged by the Corruption Investigation Office for High-ranking Officials (CIO) on multiple charges, including abuse of power on 10 September, for allegedly prodding the PPP to lodge criminal complaints against pro-government figures ahead of the April 2020 parliamentary elections to possibly influence the polls. By this point, Yoon was no longer a stable frontrunner for the PPP nomination, instead, 2017 candidate Hong Jun-pyo had overtaken Yoon according to several opinion polls.

During the campaign, Yoon made a series of controversial statements which took a toll on his support:

- Criticizing the Moon administration's 52-hour work week policy, Yoon called for more flexibility for corporate managers, saying that, for example, employees at a game development studio should be able to work up to 120 hours a week during peak season and given ample downtime when work was slow. (Currently, South Korea already has among the longest working hours among the Organisation for Economic Co-operation and Development (OECD) member states)
- Implying that the growing feminist movement in South Korea was a factor in the country's low birthrate
- "Poor people should be allowed to choose to have inferior food to eat at lower prices", in reference to government regulations and food safety.
- On Japan's Fukushima power plant, that "basically radiation leaks did not occur as the power plant itself wasn't destroyed."
- In October 2021, Yoon said of former president and dictator Chun Doo-hwan, "Many people still consider Chun as having done well in politics, except the military coup and the Gwangju Uprising," and added the claim that some people in the southwestern region of Honam, which includes Gwangju, also think that way. This comment was criticized by both the Democratic party and even within the PPP. To make matters worse, after Yoon made a reluctant apology, a photo posted on Instagram of his dog being fed an apple caused controversy. In Korean, "apology" and "apple" are homonyms and the fact that Yoon's dog was given the fruit only hours after the public apology led to criticism that Yoon was not truly sorry and dismissed the people as dogs.

===== Primary results =====
Candidate	Votes	%
Yoon Suk Yeol	347,963	47.85
Hong Jun-pyo	301,786	41.50
Yoo Seong-min	54,304	7.47
Won Hee-ryong	23,085	3.17
Total	727,138	100.00

==== Candidate ====
- Yoon Suk Yeol, former Prosecutor General of South Korea (2019–2021) (announced bid on 29 June 2021, won nomination on 5 November 2021)

2

People Power Party Ticket
Yoon Suk Yeol
for President

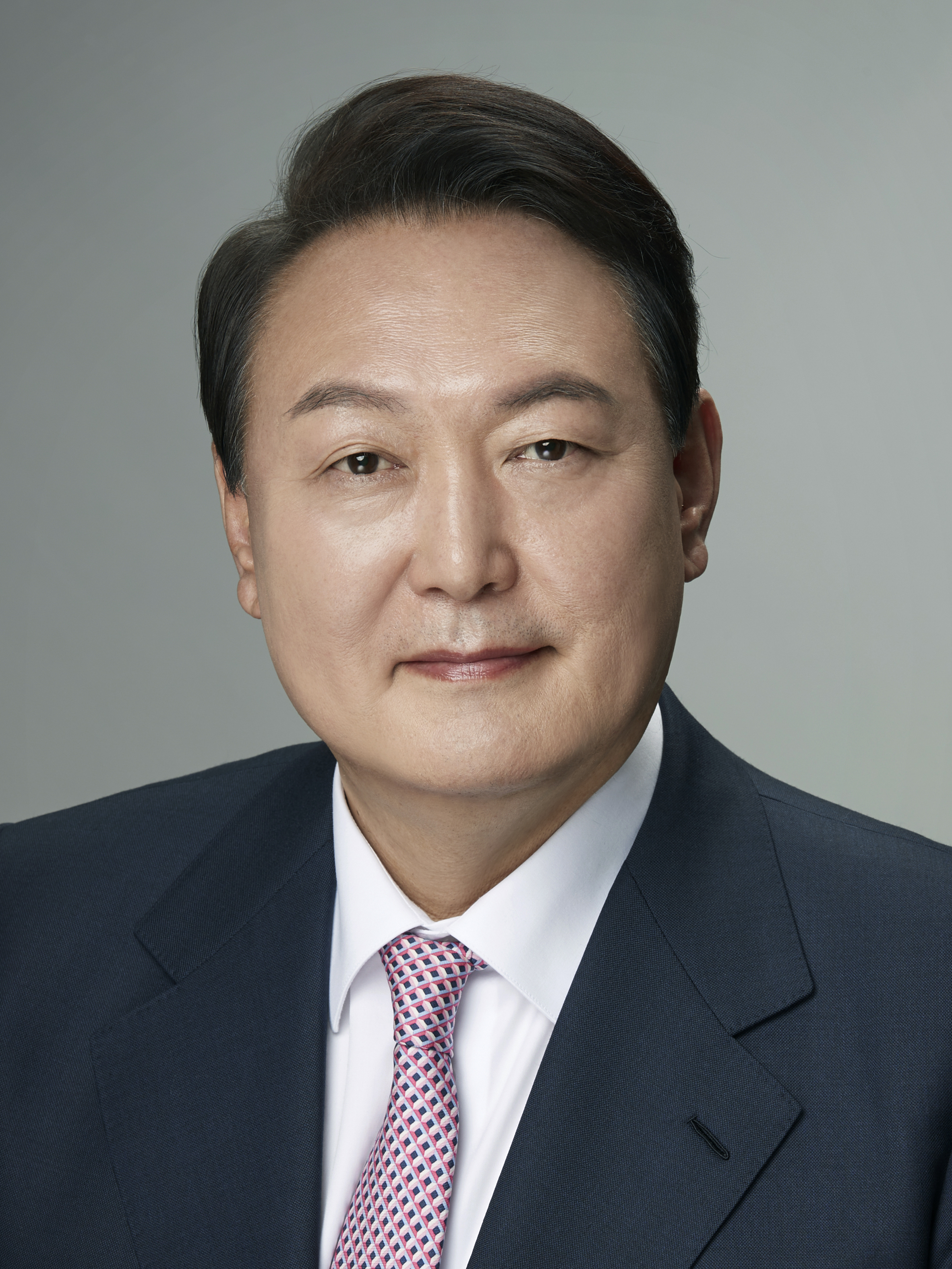

Prosecutor General of South Korea
(2019–2021)
Campaign

==== Other candidates ====
The following individuals were candidates until the conclusion of the nomination process on 5 November where Yoon Suk Yeol was announced the winner.

- Hong Joon-pyo, member of the National Assembly (1996–1999, 2001–2012, 2020–present), former Governor of South Gyeongsang (2012–2017), former leader of the Grand National Party (2011) and the Liberty Korea Party (2017–2018), and 2017 presidential nominee of the Liberty Korea Party.
- Yoo Seong-min, former member of the National Assembly (2005–2020), 2017 presidential nominee of the Bareun Party, former leader of the Bareunmirae Party (2018), and former leader of the Bareun Party (2017–2018).
- Won Hee-ryong, Governor of Jeju (2014–2021) and former member of the National Assembly (2000–2012)
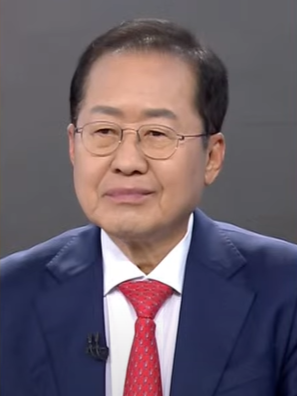
Hong Joon-pyo (announced 28 June 2021)

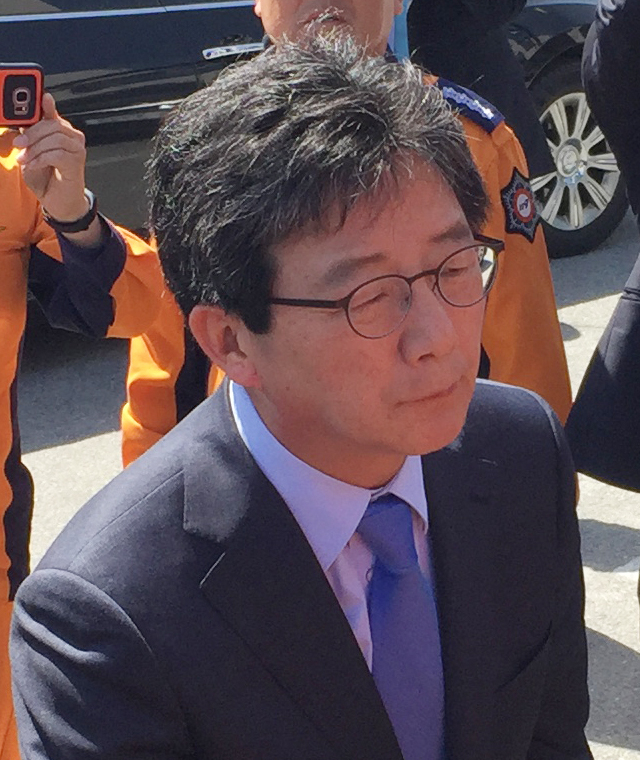
Yoo Seong-min (announced 26 May 2020)

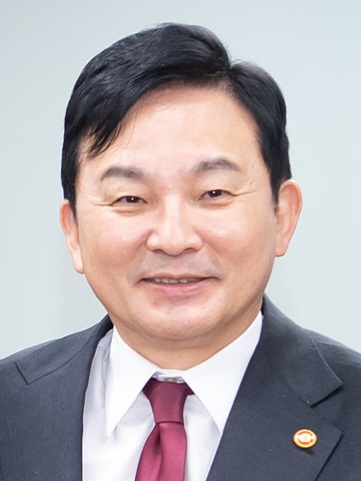
Won Hee-ryong (announced 11 October 2020)

The following 4 candidates were eliminated on 8 October.

- Ha Tae-keung, member of the National Assembly (2012–present)
- Hwang Kyo-ahn, former Acting President (2017), former Prime Minister (2015–2017), former Minister of Justice (2013–2015), former leader of the Liberty Korea Party (2019–2020), and former leader of the Future United Party (2020)
- Ahn Sang-soo, former member of the National Assembly (1999–2000, 2015–2020), former mayor of Incheon (2002–2010)
- Choi Jae-hyung, former judge and Chairman of the Board of Audit and Inspection (2018–2021) (Subsequently, endorsed Hong Jun-pyo on 16 October)
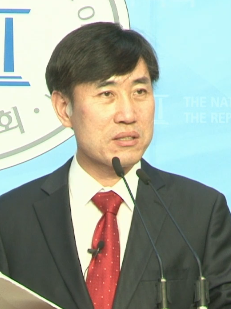
Ha Tae-keung (announced 11 June 2021)

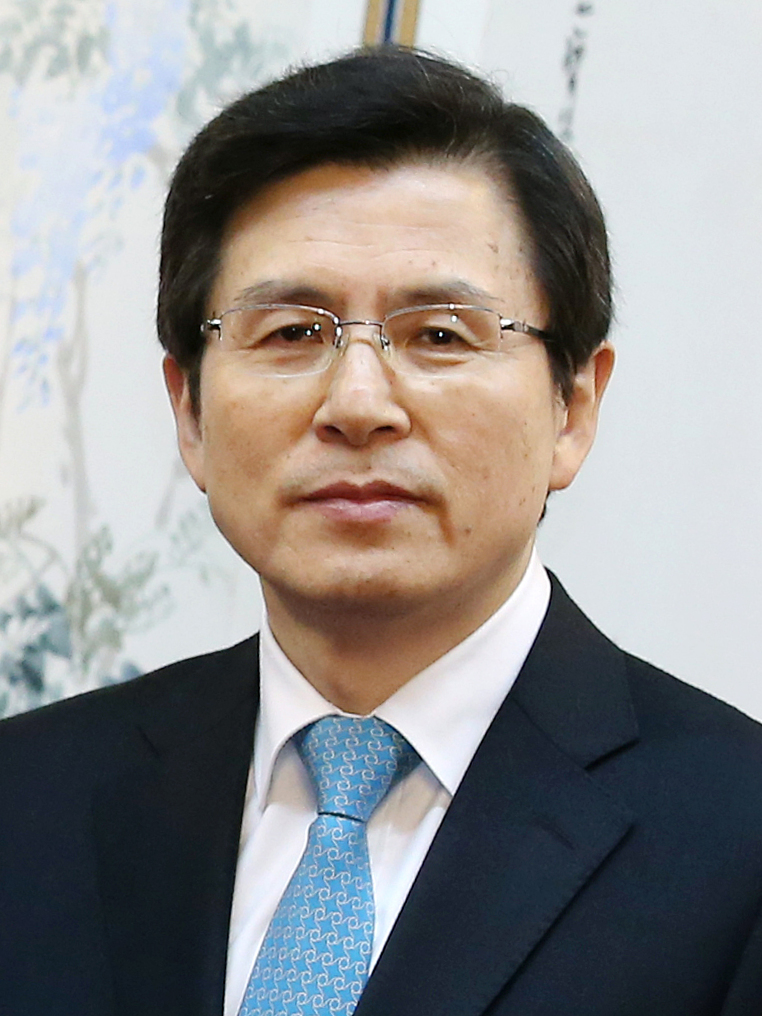
Hwang Kyo-ahn (announced 1 July 2021)

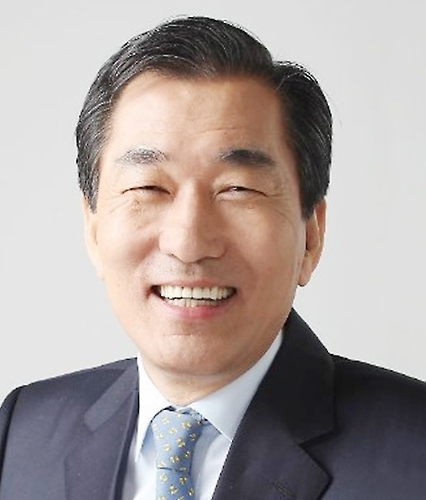
Ahn Sang-soo (announced 1 July 2021)

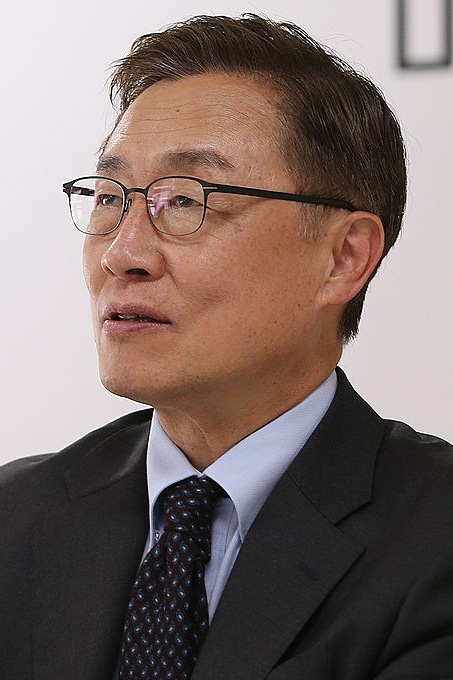
Choi Jae-hyung (announced 4 August 2021)

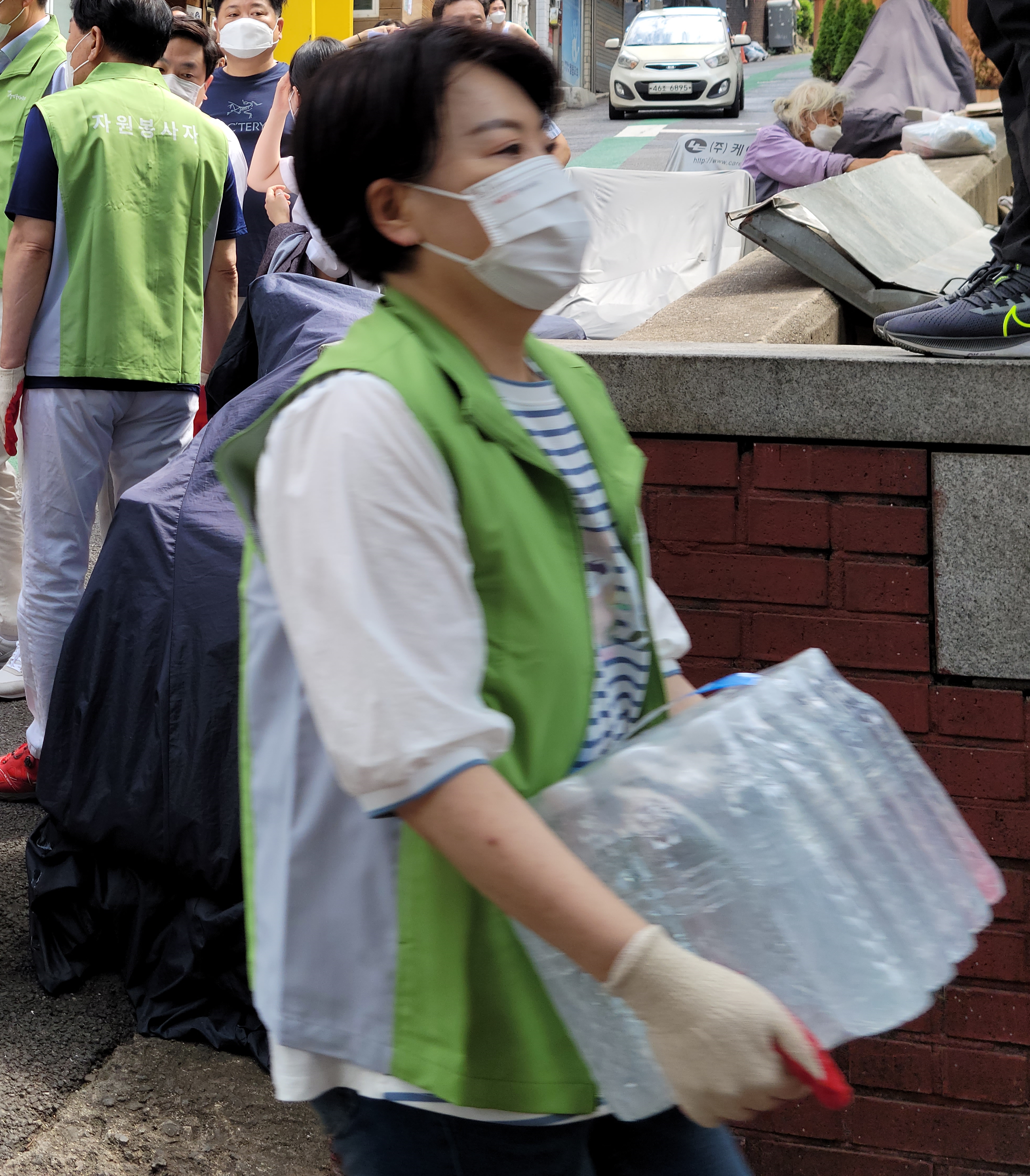
Yun Hee-suk (announced 2 July 2021)

Kim Tae-ho (announced 15 July 2021)

The following candidates were eliminated by a party cut-off process on 15 September.

- Jang Kyi-pyo, former leader of the Green Social Democratic Party (announced 6 July 2021)
- Chang Sŏng-min, 2017 National Grand Unification Party presidential nominee and former member of the National Assembly (2000–2002) (announced on 15 August 2021)

==== Withdrawn candidates ====
- Yun Hee-suk, member of the National Assembly (2020–2021) (announced 2 July 2021, ended campaign on 25 August)
- Kim Tae-ho, member of the National Assembly (2011–2016, 2020–present) , former Mayor of Geochang(2002–2004) and former Governor of South Gyeongsang (2004–2010) (announced 15 July 2021, ended campaign on 17 August)

==== Did not run ====
Amid reports of a dossier detailing illegal activities of Yoon Suk Yeol and his family in late June 2021, Seoul Mayor Oh Se-hoon, who had recently won the April 2021 mayoral by-election, was speculated to join the primary race if Yoon dropped out. Ultimately this did not materialize.

Another candidate who intended to run for the PPP nomination was Ahn Cheol-soo, founder and leader of the People Party. Ahn, a former medical doctor, software engineer and National Assembly member who is known for his centrist views, is considered a possible candidate following his performance in the 2017 presidential election. Ahn had also recently run for Mayor of Seoul in the 2021 by-elections, but had pulled out of the race and supported PPP candidate Oh Se-hoon after losing opinion surveys to Oh, who would go on to win the race. On 22 June 2021, Ahn began negotiations with the PPP and its party leader Lee Jun-seok, reportedly considering a merger between his People Party and the PPP and a bid for the presidency on the PPP ticket. These negotiations ended unsuccessfully on 16 August due to disagreements on party-level issues such as proposed changes to the PPP's name and method of picking a 2022 candidate. Ahn later ran as a third-party nominee with the People Party before dropping out and endorsing Yoon Suk Yeol.

- Oh Se-hoon, Mayor of Seoul (2021–present, 2006–2011) and former member of the National Assembly (2000–2004)
- Ahn Cheol-soo, 2017 People's Party presidential nominee, leader of the People Party, former member of the National Assembly (2013–2017), and founder of AhnLab, Inc.
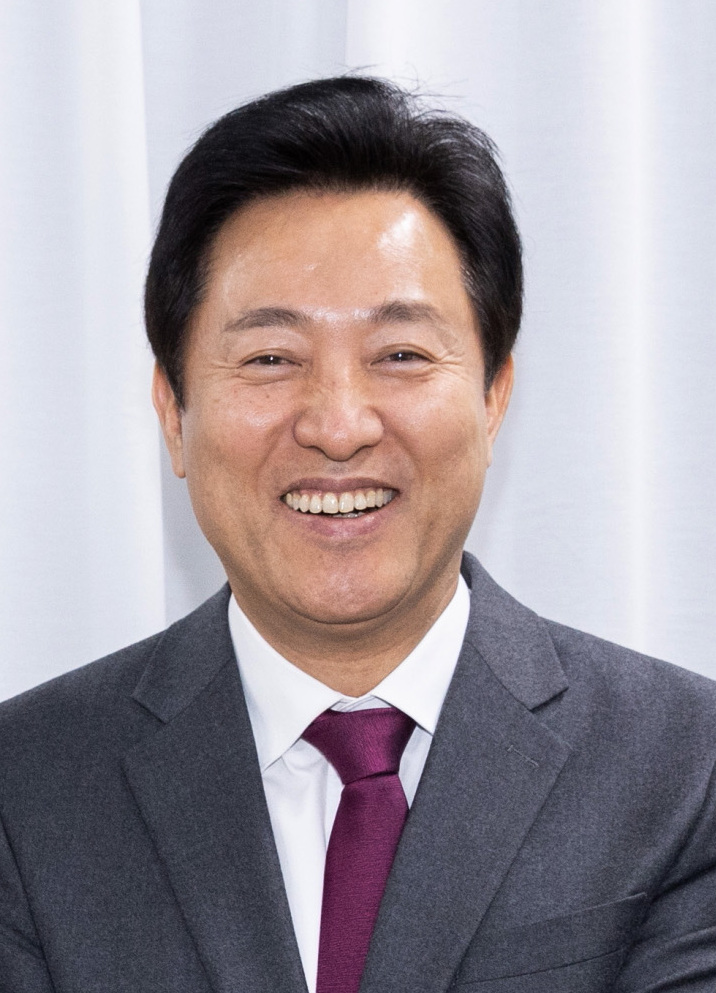
Oh Se-hoon

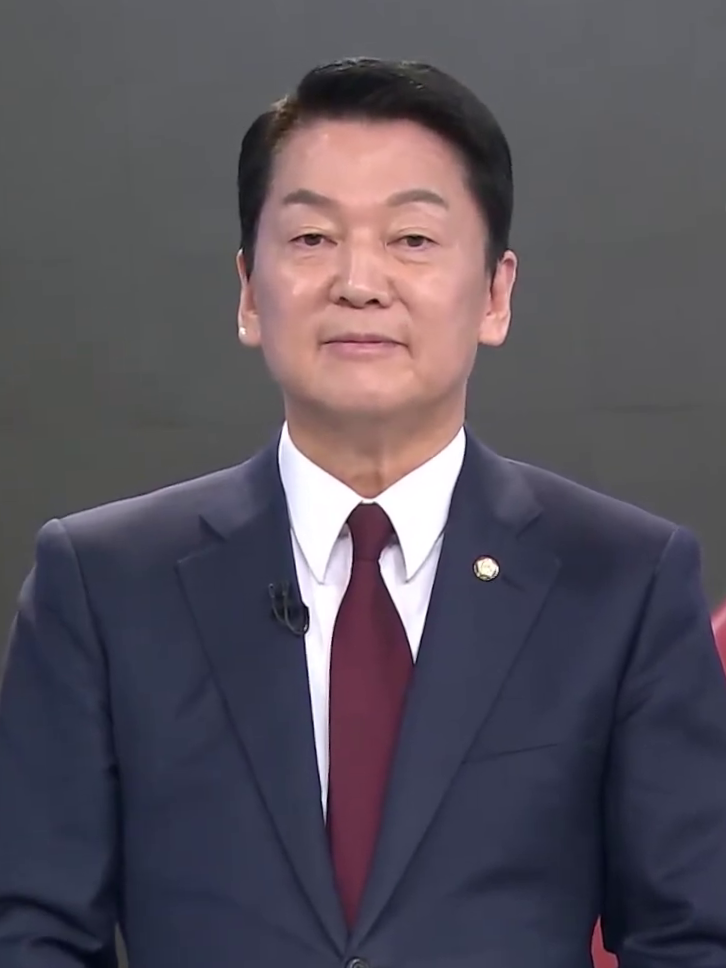
Ahn Cheol-soo

=== Justice Party ===
The Justice Party (정의당) is a centre-left, social democratic and progressive party that was founded in October 2012. The party has been the third largest party in the National Assembly after the 2020 election.

==== Candidate ====
- Sim Sang-jung, 2017 Justice Party presidential nominee, member of the National Assembly (2004–2008, 2012–present), and former leader of the Justice Party (2015–2017, 2019–2020) (announced 18 August 2021, nominated on 12 October)

3

Justice Party Ticket
Sim Sang-jung
for President

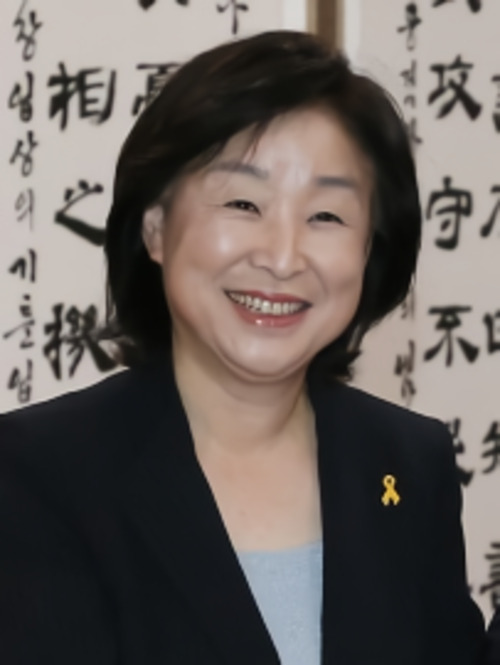

Member of the National Assembly
(2012–)

==== Other primary candidates ====
- Lee Jeong-mi, former member of the National Assembly (2016–2020) and former leader of the Justice Party (2017–2019) (announced 23 August 2021)
- Hwang Sun-sik, two-term member of the Gwacheon City Council in Gyeonggi-do. (announced 31 August 2021)
- Kim Yun-gi, acting Representative of the Justice Party (announced 2 September 2021)
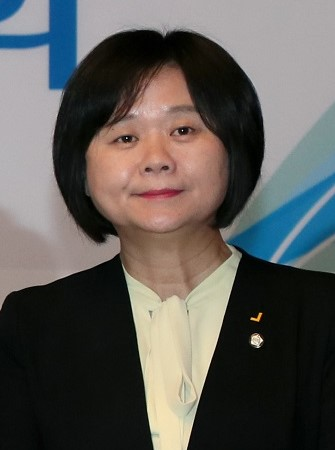
Lee Jeong-mi

=== People Party ===
The People Party (국민의당) is a conservative liberal, socially conservative and reformist party that was registered in February 2020. The party is considered a minor or third party, as current politics is mostly dominated by the centre-left Democratic Party (South Korea, 2015) and the right-wing People Power Party. It is the most recent party founded by centrist politician Ahn Cheol-soo, a former medical doctor and software executive who ran for president in the 2012 and 2017 presidential elections and emerged at various points as a possible winning contender. In the 2017 election, Ahn emerged as a major threat to eventual winner Moon Jae-in, at one point polling nearly even with Moon before collapsing in polling and finishing behind conservative firebrand candidate Hong Jun-pyo with approximately 21.41% of the vote. In the 2020 National Assembly election, the People Party fared poorly, winning a mere 3 seats; in comparison, Ahn's previous outfit, the identically named People Party, won an unexpectedly large 38 seats in the 2016 National Assembly election. In the 2021 elections, Ahn ran for Mayor of Seoul, but, in a pre-negotiated deal with the PPP, pulled out of the race after losing opinion polls to PPP candidate Oh Se-hoon and supported Oh, who would go on to win the election.

Ahn was considering a candidacy and party merger with the People Power Party. However, the negotiations between Ahn and PPP leader Lee Jun-seok ended with hostilities on 16 August 2021.

On 8 October 2021, the Party's "Central Party Election Planning Group" was launched, and it took the first steps in the process of selecting a presidential candidate.

On 1 November 2021, Ahn Cheol-soo announced his candidacy in the 2022 presidential election. The People Party's Central Party Election Planning Group stated it would receive applications for other presidential candidates for two days following Ahn's announcement, but it was considered merely a formality and that Ahn would certainly be the People Party's presidential candidate.

On 3 November, Ahn publicly rejected the idea of merging the candidacies of the People Party and the People Power Party.

On 4 November, Ahn was chosen as the People Party nominee with 92% of the vote, and he accepted the nomination.

On 3 March 2022, six days before the presidential election, Ahn dropped out of the presidential race and endorsed PPP candidate Yoon Seok-youl for president. At the time of his dropping out, Ahn was polling at around 10%.

==== Candidate ====
- Ahn Cheol-soo, 2012 independent presidential candidate, 2017 People's Party presidential nominee, leader of the People Party (2020–), former member of the National Assembly (2013–2017), and founder of AhnLab, Inc. (nominated 4 November 2021)

4

People Party Ticket
Ahn Cheol-soo
for President

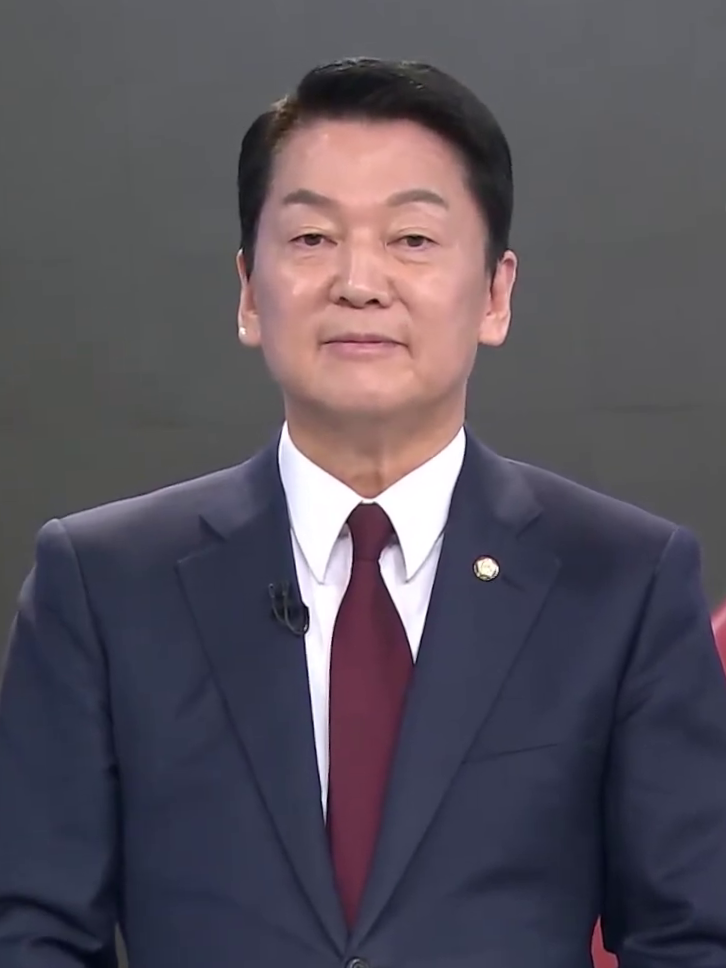

Leader of the People Party
(2020–)

=== Minor party candidates ===
Party	Candidate	Position	Notes
National Revolutionary Dividends Party	Huh Kyung-young	Syncretic	Party founder and 2021 candidate for Seoul Mayor, 1997 and 2007 Democratic Republican Party presidential candidate.
Progressive Party	Kim Jae-yeon	Left-wing to far-left	Former member of the National Assembly (2012–2014).
Our Republican Party	Cho Won-jin	Far-right	Former member of the National Assembly (2008–2020). Saenuri Party's presidential candidate in the 2017 presidential election
~~National Revolutionary Party~~	~~Ko Young-il~~	Far-right	Lawyer (Note: Resigned 12 February 2022, urging the unification of opposition power.)
Unification Korea Party	Lee Gyeong-hee	Ethnic nationalism	
~~New Wave - Squid Party~~	~~Kim Dong-yeon~~	~~Centre~~	Endorsed by Period Transition, Future Party; Withdrew on 2 March 2022. Endorsed Lee Jae Myung
Basic Income Party	Oh Jun-ho	Single issue Basic income	Member of the Korea Network of Basic Income. Ran on a policy of a universal basic income of ₩650,000 ($530) a month for all adults in South Korea.
~~Independent~~	~~Sohn Hak-kyu~~	~~Centre to centre-right~~	Former leader of the now-defunct Bareunmirae Party; Governor of Gyeonggi Province (2002–2006); Member of the National Assembly (1993–1998, 2000–2002, 2011–2012); Withdrew on 27 January 2022
Labor Party	Lee Baek-yun	Left-wing; Socialism	Former leader for the South Chungcheong Province branch of the Socialist Revolutionary Workers' Party.
~~New Korean Peninsula Party~~	~~Park Geun-Ryeong~~	Right-wing to far-right National conservatism	Biological daughter of former dictator Park Chung Hee and younger sister of impeached and imprisoned ex-President Park Geun-hye; Failed to submit required candidacy document. (Note: On 21 December 2021, the political party was quietly disbanded. She quietly gave up running without registering as a candidate after her husband was sued for sexual assault.)
Korean Wave Union Party	Kim Min-chan	Centre to centre-right	Candidate for the 2017 Presidential election. Chairman of the World Masters Committee.
~~New National Participation Party~~	~~Kim Yu-chan~~	Centre to centre-right	CEO of Korea Research Institute for Political Development. Endorsed by the Korean National Party. (Note: Did not complete candidacy requirements for the National Elections Commission)
~~Revolution 21~~	~~Hwang Jang-su~~	Right-wing to far-right	Director of Future Management Research Institute. (Note: Resigned 10 February 2022 citing health issues.)
Saenuri Party	Ok Un-ho	Far-right	Former co-represented of the Clean Election Citizen Action
New Liberal Democratic Union	Kim Gyeong-Jae	Centre-right to Right-wing	Former selected candidate for the National Revolutionary Party. but replaced and changed parties.
~~New Han People's Peninsular Peace Party~~	~~Go Don-sik~~	Ethnic nationalism	Former President of the Korea Culture, Sports and Arts Association. (Note: Did not complete candidacy requirements for the National Elections Commission)

== Registered candidates ==
#	Candidate	Affiliation	Background
1	Lee Jae Myung	Democratic	Governor of Gyeonggi (2018–2021); Mayor of Seongnam (2010–2018)
2	Yoon Suk Yeol	People Power	Prosecutor General of South Korea (2019–2021)
3	Sim Sang-jung	Justice	Member of the National Assembly (2004–2008, 2012–present); Leader of the Justice Party (2015–2017, 2019–2020)
4	~~Ahn Cheol-soo~~	People Party	Leader of the People Party (2020–present); Member of the National Assembly (2013–2017); Withdrew from the election and endorsed Yoon Suk Yeol on 3 March
5	Oh Jun-ho	Basic Income	Member of the Korea Network of Basic Income
6	Huh Kyung-young	National Revolutionary Dividends	Leader of the National Revolutionary Party (2019–present); Perennial candidate
7	Lee Baek-yun	Labor	Former leader of South Chungcheong Province branch of the Socialist Revolutionary Workers' Party
8	Ok Un-ho	Saenuri	CEO of ABIX
9	~~Kim Dong-yeon~~	New Wave	Leader of the New Wave (2021–present); Withdrew from the election and endorsed Lee Jae Myung on 2 March
10	Kim Gyeong-jae	New Liberal Democratic Union	Member of the National Assembly (1996–2004)
11	Cho Won-jin	Our Republican	Leader of the Our Republican Party (2020–present); Member of the National Assembly (2008–2020)
12	Kim Jae-yeon	Progressive	Member of the National Assembly (2012–2014)
13	Lee Gyeong-hee	Unification Korea Party	Entrepreneur
14	Kim Min-chan	Korean Wave Union Party	Candidate in the 2017 election

== Opinion polling ==
View source data.
Local regression of polls conducted

== Campaign developments ==
=== Campaign issues ===
According to a Gallup poll in January 2022, voters main priorities were solving real estate issues, economic recovery and response to the COVID-19 pandemic.

=== Negative campaigning and candidate unpopularity ===
During the primary campaign, observers noted that the presidential campaign was going down as the most negative campaign in South Korea's recent history, as the candidates were described to be busy slandering each other and not competing on the basis of values, platforms or policies.

A Hankyoreh commentary said PPP candidates like Yoo Seong-min, Won Hee-ryong, and Choi Jae-hyung, and Lee Nak-yeon and Chung Sye-kyun on the Democratic side struggled in their respective party primaries as they were too "elite" and too "respectable". A Voice of America article reported that South Korea's lax media editorial standards was responsible for playing a role in allowing unsubstantiated allegations being spread. This environment, added with complications by social media, which has fractured the media landscape and sharpened political divides has led to allowing the loudest and most divisive voices to emerge at the top (an example of such a phenomenon was cited as Donald Trump's victory over Hillary Clinton, in the 2016 U.S. election campaign).

By October,

- Yoon Suk Yeol (PPP), in addition to his controversial remarks and being accused of preparing premeditated criminal charges on figures related to the Moon government on behalf of the PPP opposition in 2020 as prosecutor general, was dogged by accusations of relying on shamanism and superstition. At a debate with primary candidates he was forced to deny meeting with an unlicensed religious medical practitioner specialising in anal acupuncture. However he ended up defending the teachings of a mystic who claimed he could travel between dimensions.
- As for candidate Hong Jun-pyo, he described himself as a strongman leader comparing himself to US President Donald Trump and China's leader Xi Jinping, and was called "Hong Trump" due to his offensive and colourful remarks. He was criticized for writing in a 2005 book that he helped his friend obtain a 'pig stimulant' to commit date rape on a woman when he was an 18-year-old college student (this controversy first emerged in his 2017 presidential run). In his 2017 campaign, he said dish-washing in the house was a woman's job.

The three main contenders, Lee for the Democratic Party, and Hong Jun-pyo and Yoon on the PPP side, were reported to have record low favorability ratings according to approval ratings compiled by Gallup Korea. Lee, has an approval rating of only 34%, while Yoon's rating was at just 30% and Hong Joon-pyo, at 28%. In contrast, President Moon Jae-in had a positive favorability rating of 47% while running for election in 2017.

A later poll in the second half of October showed that Lee's rating fell to 32%, while Yoon's rating fell to 28% (after the Chun Doo-hwan controversy) and falling behind Hong who was polled at 31%. The same pollster revealed that minor party candidates fared even worse: Sim Sang-jung from the Justice Party had 24 percent support approval against 62 percent disapproval, and Ahn Cheol-soo, leader of the People Party, had a 19 percent approval rating with 72 percent disapproval.

However, by January 2022, a Gallup poll showed the favorability ratings of Ahn Cheol-soo, Lee Jae Myung and Sim Sang-jung rose to 38%, 36% and 30% respectively, while Yoon Suk Yeol's rating crashed to 25%.

=== Recruitment of left-wing feminists to the conservative camps ===
On 21 December 2021, despite conservative People Power Party candidate Yoon Suk Yeol being openly anti-feminist, two famous left-wing women's rights activists, Shin Ji-ye and Lee Soo-jung, joined the conservative camp for president. Yoon's camp most notably recruited Shin Ji-ye, a two time candidate for Seoul Mayor in 2018 under the Green Party and again in 2021 as an independent. Shin stated, "(Yoon) pledged to resolve violence against women, address the climate crisis and create a Republic of Korea that overcomes (the division of) left and right and moves forward, so I decided to take part." Many criticized this move, including:

- Choi Hyun-sook, an LGBTQ human rights activist, left a comment on Shin Ji-ye's Facebook statement, saying, "She must have been such a human being."
- Ha Heon-ki, a youth spokesman for the Democratic Party (South Korea, 2015), said on Facebook, "She ended up going to the place she had commented on as Hitler's party."
- Austin Bashore, long-time friend of Shin and member of the Green Party US tweeted "This was not our plan", "Nobody saw this coming, even her closest friends", and "I met Shin Ji-ye in her apartment two weeks ago for a friendship brunch. As friends do, we talked about politics and she said she did not know [who] to support, so I suggested, as friends do, to support Progressive Party candidate Kim Jae-yeon." Bashore also called her an "opportunist," which began trending on Korean Twitter from 21 to 22 December 2021.
- The Korean Women's Political Network, in which Shin helped found, also made it clear that "CEO Shin's decision was not discussed in advance with the Korean Women's Political Network and was irrelevant to the organizational decision."
- Kim Min-jae, a spokesperson for the New Wave - Squid Party youth caucus, commented, "It is an opportunistic appearance to seize vested interests and complete chaos to sleep with the enemy in order to seize votes."
- Justice Party spokesman Kim Chang-in commented, "The change is bizarre."
- Shin Ji-hye, standing representative of the Basic Income Party, urged candidate Yoon Suk Yeol to reveal the national vision for what it is, saying, "Stop the show."
- The Green Party left a notice saying it would return the donations Shin Ji-ye received when she ran for the mayor of Seoul in 2018 under the Green Party banner.

On 23 December, two days after the recruitment of Shin Ji-ye, party leader Lee Jun-seok, who had a year-long conflict with Shin Ji-ye over gender politics, stepped down from all his roles in the presidential campaign, and called for the campaign committee to be overhauled.

On 3 January 2022, after only 14 days, Shin Ji-ye resigned from her position as senior vice-chair of the New Generation Policy Committee, citing conflicts with Lee Jun-seok and plummeting poll numbers for Yoon Suk Yeol.

On 19 January 2022, Lee Soo-jung, a criminal psychology professor and feminist, also quit the Yoon campaign. Lee resigned due to Yoon's wife's comments about the MeToo movement during an 8-hour long phone interview with TV broadcaster MBC's investigative news show Straight, in which she mocked victims of sexual assault.

=== Infighting in Yoon's campaign team and PPP ===
By January, as a result of infighting within Yoon's campaign team and Yoon's dispute with party leader Lee Jun-seok, Lee Jae Myung reversed Yoon's poll lead and built a healthy poll lead ranging from 6 to 10 points, outside the margin of error. The centrist Ahn Cheol-soo also ate into Yoon's support, gaining support in the range of 10 to 15%. A Realmeter survey commissioned by YTN with 1,024 voters between the ages of 18 and 39 conducted showed that Yoon had only 18.4 percent support from respondents, trailing Lee Jae-myung at 33.4 percent and Ahn Cheol-soo at 19.1 percent, marking a plunge in support from the youth demographic in contrast to the lead he had when he was nominated for the PPP in this crucial demographic.

Yoon Seok-yeol then disbanded his election campaign committee, following weeks of internal dispute on 5 January. The campaign had recruited former party leader and veteran campaigner Kim Chong-in to be the campaign manager, before the infighting took place and Yoon pointed out that numerous leadership posts including the chief, subcommittee chiefs and standing chairpersons and internal subcommittees slowed down the decision-making process, which was one of Lee Jun-seok's criticisms of his campaign.

On 3 January, Kim, the election committee's top chief, had made an announcement of an overhaul of the committee without informing Yoon in advance. As a result, Yoon reportedly sacked Kim and reshuffled his campaign team, while "asking [Kim] to continue giving advice". However, Kim announced he had quit early on 5 January even before Yoon proposed the disbandment, and said he had disagreements with Yoon's campaign staff, leading to the parting of ways. Yoon appointed Rep. Kwon Yeong-se as his new campaign chief.

However, on 6 January, PPP members began demanding the party chairman to quit on grounds that he was damaging the party's chances of winning the election, although the majority of the public blamed Yoon for the chaos enveloping his campaign. By the end of the same day however, Yoon and Lee reached an agreement to put their long-running feud behind them.

=== Sim Sang-jung suspends campaign activities ===
On 12 January 2022, The Justice Party candidate, Sim Sang-jung suspended campaign activities and went into seclusion amid low ratings, to craft "reform plans". A day later, her campaign chief and election committee members decided to resign and the committee was "virtually disbanded," as key campaign leaders tendered their resignations.

On 19 January 2022, Sim resumed campaign appearances with a visit to the national office of the Green Party. Together, they discussed their combined plans to combat climate change and pushed for an anti-discrimination law. There is currently no form of anti-discrimination legislation in the Republic of Korea.

=== Bus accident deaths involving Ahn Cheol-soo's campaigners ===
On 15 February 2022, the first legal day of the presidential campaign, two members of the People's Party presidential campaign died in an apparent accident with the campaign tour bus. The bus driver and the campaign chair for the city of Nonsan died of apparent carbon monoxide poisoning inside the bus in the central city in Cheonan around 5:24 PM local time. One person was also rushed to a local hospital while unconscious. In response, Ahn halted all scheduled appearances for the remainder of the week.

=== Ahn's withdrawal from the campaign, endorsing Yoon Suk Yeol ===
On 20 February 2022, Ahn clarified that there won't be further negotiations over unification with Yoon Suk Yeol, a week after he proposed a unified opposition campaign through opinion polls that ask who will be more suitable for the presidency and to defeat Lee Jae Myung, the nominee of the governing Democratic Party.

However, on the night of 2 March 2022, hours after the last presidential debate, Ahn met Yoon at the house of the brother-in-law of Chang Je-won, assemblymember for the People Power Party, and a close aide to Yoon. On the morning of 3 March, Ahn and Yoon made a joint statement that the two candidates decided to join forces to change the government. Ahn will be involved in the takeover committee, in the case of Yoon's victory, and the two parties will merge weeks after the election.

The unification seemed to be over by most of the commentators, as ballot papers including Ahn's name were already printed. In addition, absentee ballots of overseas residents have already been cast between 23 and 28 February. Those voting on the day of the election will still see Ahn's name on the ballot, even though ballots cast for Ahn will be counted invalid. After the joint statement, the members' board of the People Party went down due to an overflow of complaints of the members of the party.

Ahn also faced criticisms over breaking his promise of achieving Third Way politics and implementing multi-party system in South Korean politics. Just days before the unification, he said "if you vote for Yoon, you'll want to cut your finger after a year".

Ahn also secured his public image as "withdrawal", which is the Korean word that sounds the same as Ahn's given name, Cheol-soo. This is the fourth election in which Ahn withdrew his candidacy. Ahn withdrew in 2011 and 2021 to Park Won-soon and Oh Se-hoon respectively for the mayoralty of Seoul, and in 2012 and 2022 to Moon Jae-in and Yoon Suk Yeol respectively for the presidency.

=== Attack against Song Young-gil ===
On 7 March 2022, the Democratic Party president Song Young-gil was attacked while campaigning for the presidential candidate, Lee Jae Myung, in Sinchon. He was immediately brought to a nearby hospital, and was reportedly safe. Several Democratic MPs were criticised for labelling the incident as a "far-right terrorism", although the suspect was reportedly a Democratic-friendly YouTuber.

News1 reported that the incident is reminiscent of the 2006 local elections, when the then–Grand National Party (GNP) president Park Geun-hye was stabbed while campaigning. The incident reportedly contributed to an overwhelming victory of the GNP, including the Daejeon mayorship election where the GNP was expected to lose but won in the end. Based on this incident, the newspaper also analysed that the attack against Song could possibly bring a positive consequence to the Democratic Party and Lee Jae Myung.

== Voting ==
Due to the COVID-19 pandemic in South Korea, changes were made to voting. The pandemic had reached record levels of daily infections in South Korea around the time of the election amidst the arrival of the transmissible SARS-CoV-2 Omicron variant. A record 37% eligible voters voted early, and South Korean electoral law was modified ahead of the election to permit people with COVID-19 who were isolating to vote - estimated at over 1 million people at the time of the election. Polls were open later than usual to allow people with COVID-19 to vote.

== Exit polls ==
When polls closed, two separate exit polls released at 7:30 p.m. KST gave conflicting results within the margin of error, showing the election was too close to call.

KBS, MBC, and SBS terrestrial broadcasting exit survey (margin of error: 0.8%)

Candidate	Estimated percentage
Yoon Suk Yeol	48.4%
Lee Jae Myung	47.8%
Sim Sang-jung	2.5%

Breakdown of KBS/MBC/SBS exit poll
Demographic group	Lee	Yoon
Total vote	47.8	48.4
Age
18–29 years old	47.8	45.5
30–39 years old	46.3	48.1
40–49 years old	60.5	35.4
50–59 years old	52.4	43.9
60–69 years old	32.8	64.8
70 and older	28.5	69.9
Age by gender
18–29 years old men	36.3	58.7
18–29 years old women	58.0	33.8
30–39 years old men	42.6	52.8
30–39 years old women	49.7	43.8
40–49 years old men	61.0	35.2
40–49 years old women	60.0	35.6
50–59 years old men	55.0	41.8
50–59 years old women	50.1	45.8
60–69 years old men	33.9	63.3
60–69 years old women	31.8	66.0
70+ years old men	25.6	72.5
70+ years old women	30.7	67.8

JTBC broadcasting exit survey

Candidate	Estimated percentage
Lee Jae Myung	48.4%
Yoon Suk Yeol	47.7%

== Results ==
The Korean Broadcasting System was the first broadcaster to forecast that Yoon would be the winner of the election at 3:22 a.m. KST on the morning of 10 March. Shortly after at 3:50 a.m. KST, Lee conceded defeat and congratulated Yoon for his victory. Yoon's victory margin of 0.73% made this the closest presidential election result in South Korean history. Yoon called the result "a victory for the people", and indicated that national unity for Koreans was his top priority.

Lee won Jeju Island, Incheon and Gyeonggi Province (the most populous province in South Korea), where he was a former governor; however, the housing crisis in Seoul swung the city and its suburbs to the conservative Yoon with a 310,000 vote margin (previously, liberal Moon Jae-in won Seoul twice in his two campaigns in 2012 and 2017). This allowed Yoon to overcome Lee nationwide by 247,000 raw votes. Lee won the Honam provinces of Jeolla and the city of Gwangju with over 80% of votes; however Yoon's vote share of >10% was the best result a conservative candidate had achieved in these liberal strongholds.

Vote share by municipalities and provinces (inset)

Candidate	Party	Votes	%
Yoon Suk Yeol	People Power Party	16,394,815	48.56
Lee Jae Myung	Democratic Party	16,147,738	47.83
Sim Sang-jung	Justice Party	803,358	2.38
Huh Kyung-young	National Revolutionary Party	281,481	0.83
Kim Jae-yeon	Progressive Party	37,366	0.11
Cho Won-jin	Our Republican Party	25,972	0.08
Oh Jun-ho	Basic Income Party	18,105	0.05
Kim Min-chan	Korean Wave Alliance	17,305	0.05
Lee Gyeong-hee	Korean Unification	11,708	0.03
Lee Baek-yun	Labor Party	9,176	0.03
Kim Gyeong-jae	New Liberal Democratic Union	8,317	0.02
Ok Un-ho	Saenuri Party	4,970	0.01
Total		33,760,311	100.00
Valid votes		33,760,311	99.10
Invalid/blank votes		307,542	0.90
Total votes		34,067,853	100.00
Registered voters/turnout		44,197,692	77.08
Source: Election results

=== By province and city ===
Province/City	Yoon Suk Yeol		Lee Jae Myung		Sim Sang-jung		Huh Kyung-young		Kim Jae-yeon		Cho Won-jin		Oh Jun-ho		Kim Min-chan		Lee Gyeong-hee		Lee Baek-yun		Kim Gyeong-jae		Ok Un-ho	
Province/City	Votes	%	Votes	%	Votes	%	Votes	%	Votes	%	Votes	%	Votes	%	Votes	%	Votes	%	Votes	%	Votes	%	Votes	%
Seoul	3,255,747	50.56	2,944,981	45.74	180,324	2.80	36,540	0.57	5,615	0.09	4,657	0.07	3,829	0.06	1,907	0.03	1,333	0.02	1,571	0.02	1,791	0.03	844	0.01
Busan	1,270,072	58.28	831,896	38.17	47,541	2.18	21,990	1.01	2,799	0.13	1,867	0.09	1,071	0.05	942	0.04	575	0.03	546	0.03	527	0.02	352	0.02
Daegu	1,199,888	75.18	345,045	21.62	31,131	1.95	13,941	0.87	938	0.06	2,824	0.18	892	0.06	619	0.04	472	0.03	344	0.02	451	0.03	261	0.02
Incheon	878,560	47.07	913,320	48.94	51,852	2.78	16,733	0.90	1,593	0.09	1,378	0.07	1,116	0.06	758	0.04	511	0.03	508	0.03	449	0.02	276	0.01
Gwangju	124,511	12.73	830,058	84.84	14,865	1.52	6,138	0.63	1,366	0.14	112	0.01	434	0.04	455	0.05	188	0.02	242	0.02	140	0.01	92	0.01
Daejeon	464,060	49.58	434,950	46.47	25,445	2.72	8,593	0.92	958	0.10	588	0.06	566	0.06	395	0.04	258	0.03	223	0.02	227	0.02	138	0.01
Ulsan	396,321	54.43	297,134	40.81	21,292	2.92	9,234	1.27	2,180	0.30	685	0.09	375	0.05	333	0.05	234	0.03	308	0.04	185	0.03	109	0.01
Sejong	101,491	44.16	119,349	51.93	6,780	2.95	1,594	0.69	181	0.08	121	0.05	100	0.04	88	0.04	66	0.03	50	0.02	48	0.02	23	0.01
Gyeonggi	3,965,341	45.64	4,428,151	50.97	205,709	2.37	63,207	0.73	8,768	0.10	5,897	0.07	4,151	0.05	3,192	0.04	1,927	0.02	1,919	0.02	1,990	0.02	1,124	0.01
Gangwon	544,980	54.21	419,644	41.74	25,031	2.49	11,668	1.16	1,260	0.13	824	0.08	582	0.06	560	0.06	525	0.05	323	0.03	262	0.03	181	0.02
North Chungcheong	511,921	50.70	455,853	45.15	26,557	2.63	11,165	1.11	1,083	0.11	779	0.08	614	0.06	653	0.06	698	0.07	385	0.04	288	0.03	213	0.02
South Chungcheong	670,283	51.10	589,991	44.98	31,789	2.42	14,169	1.08	1,586	0.12	899	0.07	750	0.06	864	0.07	791	0.06	477	0.04	314	0.02	200	0.02
North Jeolla	176,809	14.43	1,016,863	83.00	19,451	1.59	7,975	0.65	896	0.07	299	0.02	542	0.04	1,464	0.12	409	0.03	377	0.03	199	0.02	135	0.01
South Jeolla	145,549	11.45	1,094,872	86.13	16,279	1.28	8,322	0.65	1,917	0.15	296	0.02	672	0.05	2,246	0.18	507	0.04	473	0.04	304	0.02	179	0.01
North Gyeongsang	1,278,922	72.80	418,371	23.81	33,123	1.89	18,028	1.03	1,763	0.10	2,431	0.14	964	0.05	1,046	0.06	1,607	0.09	535	0.03	550	0.03	356	0.02
South Gyeongsang	1,237,346	58.27	794,130	37.40	52,591	2.48	28,645	1.35	3,892	0.18	2,044	0.10	1,180	0.06	1,473	0.07	1,379	0.06	749	0.04	491	0.02	424	0.02
Jeju	173,014	42.71	213,130	52.62	13,598	3.36	3,539	0.87	571	0.14	271	0.07	267	0.07	310	0.08	228	0.06	146	0.04	101	0.02	63	0.02
Total	16,394,815	48.56	16,147,738	47.83	803,358	2.38	281,481	0.83	37,366	0.11	25,972	0.08	18,105	0.05	17,305	0.05	11,708	0.03	9,176	0.03	8,317	0.02	4,970	0.01
Source: National Election Commission

Sim Sang-jung (Justice Party)'s vote share by municipalities

== Aftermath ==
Commentators suggested that the Democrats' defeat, and the comeback of the conservatives was unforeseen given their landslide defeat in the 2017 election after the Park Geun-hye impeachment. Reasons cited for the defeat of the Democrats included their failure to provide high-quality housing at affordable prices, double standards in the government's anti-corruption campaign, limited success in achieving promised social reforms despite an overwhelming majority in the National Assembly, and failure to nurture new political talents (unlike the PPP).

In October 2024, it was revealed that the opinion polls showing National Revolutionary Party candidate and cult leader Huh Kyung-young above Justice Party candidate Sim Sang-jung were faked. Myung Tae-kyun, a political broker closely aligned with President Yoon Suk Yeol, artificially and illegally inflated the results of the opinion polls to favor Huh. He attempted to raise the approval rating of National Revolutionary Party candidate Huh in order to have him appear in a TV debate, after which he attempted to attack Democratic Party candidate Lee Jae Myung. In a recorded call with People Power Party member and deputy director at the Future Korea Research Institute, Kang Hye-kyung, Myung asked "Is the opinion poll coming out today? Huh Kyung-young needs to come out to have an advantage now." Myung continued, "Huh Kyung-young is also the breadwinner for all the kids under him, so when they give out the results (of the opinion poll), shouldn't it come out at 5%?" One of the criteria for a candidate to appear on the televised candidate debates is for the candidate to poll at 5% in 3 different polling firms approved by the National Elections Commission, to which the Future Korea Research Institute was accredited during 2022 election.

In January 2026, South Korean prosecutors launched a formal investigation into allegations of political interference involving the Shincheonji Church of Jesus and the Unification Church during the 2021 presidential primary. Former Daegu Mayor Hong Joon-pyo claimed that in August 2022, Shincheonji leader Lee Man-hee told him that over 100,000 followers were directed to join the PPP as "responsible members" to support then-candidate Yoon Suk Yeol during the 2021 primary. Critics allege this support was in exchange for Yoon, then Prosecutor General, blocking a police raid on Shincheonji headquarters during the early COVID-19 pandemic.
