= Revolution 21 =

2021–2024 political party in South Korea

- Leader: Bang Young-cheol
- Founded: April 28, 2021
- Dissolved: March 25, 2024
- Headquarters: 7-an-gil, Jandari-ro, Mapo-gu, Seoul
- Ideology: Right-wing populism Conservatism
- Political position: Right wing
- Colours: Blue

Korean name
- Hangul: 혁명21
- Hanja: 革命21
- RR: Hyeongmyeong 21
- MR: Hyŏngmyŏng 21

Revolution 21 (Korean: 혁명21) was a South Korean political party founded by the current affairs commentator Hwang Jang-soo.

== History ==
In November 2020, the party's Preparatory Committee was registered with the party itself officially being registered in April 2021.

Hwang Jang-soo, then leader of the party and a YouTuber announced that he would run in the 2022 South Korean presidential election after receiving 99.5% of the votes in an online party vote among party members. The party planned to put forward "judgement and liquidation of the Moon Jae-in administration, punishment for the failure of COVID-19 containment, and changes to quarantine policies" as its political platform for the election.

In the 2022 South Korean local elections, the party ran candidate Kim Jae-sang in Busan Metropolitan City for the local council, Yeongdo-gu.

The party was dissolved on 25 March 2024 and subsequently did not participate in the 2024 South Korean legislative election.

The party held rallies against Google Korea claiming it was censoring right-wing YouTube channels.

== Election history ==
=== Local elections ===
Year	Election	Metropolitan mayors/governors		Municipal mayors		Metropolitan council members		Municipal council members	
Year	Election	Seats won	Success rate	Seats won	Success rate	Seats won	Success rate	Seats won	Success rate
2022	8th	0/17	0%	0/226	0%	0/872	0%	0/2,988	0%
