= New Wave (South Korean political party) =

2021–2022 political party in South Korea

New Wave 새로운물결
- Leader: Kim Dong-yeon
- Secretary-General: Park Gi-tae
- Central Planning: Moon Woo-sik
- Chair of the Policy Planning Committee: Sim Jae-seong
- Founded: 28 August 2021
- Registered: 3 January 2022
- Dissolved: 15 April 2022
- Preceded by: Transition Korea (factions)
- Merged into: Democratic Party of Korea
- Succeeded by: Brighter Future Party (factions)
- Ideology: Reformism
- Political position: Centre
- Colors: Green; Yellow green Blue

Website
- newwavekorea.kr

- New Wave
- Hangul: 새로운물결
- RR: Saeroun mulgyeol
- MR: Saeroun mulkyŏl

The New Wave (Korean: 새로운물결, abbreviated as 새물결; Saemulgyeol) was a self-proclaimed centrist political party in South Korea created to assist in Kim Dong-yeon's run in the 2022 South Korean presidential election. The party was formally registered on 3 January 2022.

== History ==
The New Wave Party was formed in October 2021 to assist career civil servant and former Deputy Prime Minister Kim Dong-yeon's run in the 2022 presidential election. "As long as the current political ecosystem dominated by the two major parties remains, it is impossible to resolve structural problems that Korea has been suffering from for the past 20 years," Kim said during the party's founding ceremony. Kim denied merging his new party with the two ruling parties in Korea, the Democratic Party and People Power Party.

Cho Jung-hoon, proportional representative Member of Parliament for Transition Korea Party, expressed his congratulations for the creation of the party.

On 24 October 2021, the Party adopted four key "visions:"

- Create a 'Youth Investment Nation' by creating a youth startup paradise
- Work-based government through regulatory reform.
- Resolve 'opportunities polarization' in income, real estate, and education
- 'Political reforms' to break the winner-take-all political structure, including a 3-year limited decentralized Presidency.

On 7 April 2022, party leader Kim Dong-yeon agreed to merge the New Wave with the Democratic Party of Korea to promote change in politics and national unity. The merger was completed by 15 April 2022.

=== Election results ===
Election	Location	Candidate	Votes	%	Place	Result
2022 President	Nationwide	Kim Dong-yeon	0	0%		Withdrew
2022 By-Election	Parliament; Jong-ro District	Song Moon-hee	535	0.56%	7 of 12	Loss
