= Myung Tae-kyun =

South Korean businessman and journalist (born 1970)

Myung Tae-Kyun
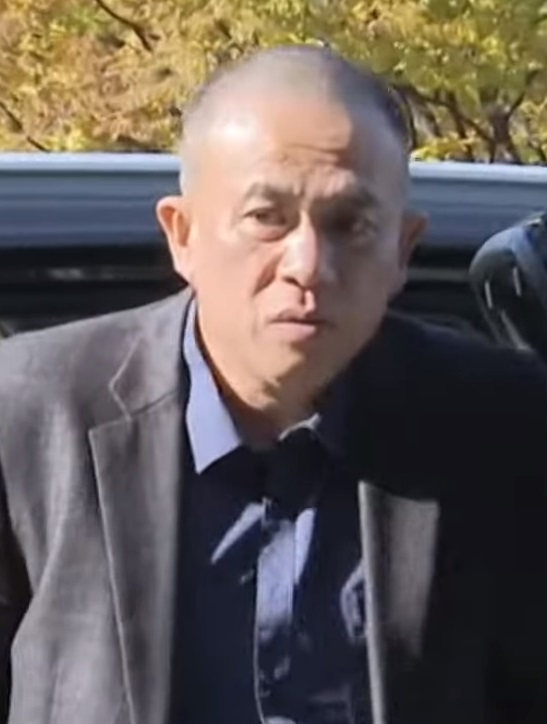
- Myung Tae-kyun on 8 November 2024
- Born: 1970 (age 55–56); Changnyeong, South Korea

Korean name
- Hangul: 명태균
- RR: Myeong Taegyun
- MR: Myŏng T'aegyun

Myung Tae-kyun (Korean: 명태균, born 1970) is a South Korean businessman and journalist recognized as a key figure in the 2024 political scandal involving First Lady Kim Keon Hee and several conservative politicians. Prominent in South Gyeongsang Province, he is accused of conducting unverified polls and unlawfully influencing elections through the "Future Korea Research Institute" (미래한국연구소) – an organization he founded.

In the lead-up to the 2018 South Korean local elections, he conducted illegal public opinion polls without proper qualifications and was convicted of violating the Public Official Election Act (공직선거법).

On July 10, 2019, he was sentenced to 10 months in prison with a two-year probation for fraud and violation of the Attorney-at-Law Act (변호사법), after accepting bribes from a Grade 6 civil servant in exchange for lobbying for their promotion to Grade 5.

Myung had largely remained behind the scenes until he emerged into the public spotlight amid the so-called People Power Party Primary Lobby Scandal – in which Myung brokered quid pro quo deals with PPP primary candidates and lobbied for their nominations. Key political figures, including Lee Jun-seok, Kim Young-sun, and President Yoon Suk Yeol, face allegations of receiving Myung's support in their elections. The first opposition party, the Democratic Party of Korea, and Cho Kuk's Rebuilding Korea Party dubbed the scandal Myung Tae-kyun Gate (명태균게이트) and likened Myung to Choi Soon-sil – a key figure in the 2016 South Korean political scandal that resulted in former president Park Geun-hye's impeachment and imprisonment.

== 2024 South Korean political scandal ==
On September 19, 2024, News Tomato (뉴스토마토), a small media outlet, raised suspicions that during the 2022 special election, President Yoon Suk Yeol and his wife Kim Keon Hee suddenly pressed for the nomination of Kim Young-sun in Uichang, Changwon, South Gyeongsang Province, after a call with Myung. Kim Young-sun was nominated and elected as a PPP candidate in the special election and served as a member of the National Assembly until 2024.

A follow-up report released on the same day indicated that Myung and the first lady were also involved in the PPP's nomination process for the 2024 legislative election. Kim Young-sun also reportedly had a meeting with Lee Jun-seok of the New Reform Party at Chilbulsa Temple in Jirisan, when he was eventually cut off from the 2024 nomination and demanded to be first in the list of the NRP's proportional representation candidates in exchange for revealing his plotting with Kim Keon Hee.

On September 20, JTBC reported that the prosecution confirmed circumstantial evidence that Kim Young-sun delivered ₩63,000,000 to Myung shortly after the 2022 special election.

=== Future Korea Research Institute ===
He served as chairman of Future Korea Research Institute (미래한국연구소), a polling firm. The institute mainly conducted polls in the form of being listed as a client for surveys conducted by other pollster, PNR. Yoon Suk Yeol was found to have topped 49 of the 50 surveys conducted by the institute in the face of the 2022 presidential election, which led to suspicions of tampering with samples since it differed from the general toss-up between Yoon Suk Yeol and Lee Jae-myung in other surveys.

On October 6, The Hankyoreh's report revealed that the Future Korea Research Institute was accused of illegal polling four times from 2019 to 2022 and received three warnings and one fine.

On October 11, No Cut News reported that Myung collected personal information of about 570,000 members of the PPP in 2021, especially 8,500 of which were stored in the form of internal codes by encrypting their propensity to support, age, gender, and region. Pointing out that Myung did not publish it even after conducting the poll, the report said it is necessary to explain why he conducted the poll which he would not even publish, and where he tried to use the collected information.

On October 15, an exclusive report by News Tomato revealed a recording of Myung's phone call directing the specific results of the polls during the PPP's presidential primary. In the call, he asked a working-level official to adjust the approval ratings of Yoon Suk Yeol and Hong Joon-pyo, the two main candidates of the race at the time, to make Yoon appear ahead.

=== Myung Tae-kyun gate ===
Myung made sensational claims on his Facebook page about his relationships with important political figures, but most of them denied the allegations.

Lee Jun-seok, a member of the New Reform Party, was suspected of rising to prominence in the 2021 PPP leadership election and the 2024 legislative election with Myung's support. Na Kyung-won, once a leading contender for party leadership but ultimately defeated by Lee, challenged him by referencing an early morning meeting between Myung and Lee at Chilbulsa Temple. Lee has strongly denied any ties to Myung, instead highlighting his association with other key figures in the allegation, President Yoon and First Lady Kim.

Seoul Mayor Oh Se-hoon faced allegations of receiving Myung's support during the 2021 special election. In a press interview, Myung claimed Oh had pleaded for his help, even breaking down in tears on four occasions. Oh dismissed Myung's claim, stating that he was ready to press charges against him.

On October 15, Myung released a record of his messages with Kim Keon Hee on his Facebook page. The messages generally contained Kim Kun-hee apologizing for her "oppa (오빠) who talks without thinking" and relying on Myung. Under speculation that the word "oppa" meant President Yoon Suk Yeol, Those messages sparked suspicions that the first lady was frequently involved in the president's state affairs. However, the presidential office dismissed the controversy, saying that "oppa" means her own brother.

On the same night, during an interview with CBS, Myung said the details of the conversation between him and the president and his wife were over 2,000 pages long, suggesting further revelations.

On October 21, Kang Hye-kyung, a close confidant of Myung, appeared before the National Assembly's Legislative and Judiciary Committee. She mostly affirmed Myung's alleged manipulation of opinion polls and his alleged involvement in the nomination process with first lady Kim Keon Hee. Since Myung stopped making bombshell allegations on October 16, Kang has taken on the role of a key informant in the scandal.

During the testimony, Jeon Hyun-hee asked, "Who gave Kim Young-sun's nomination?" Kang responded, "It was from Kim Keon Hee." She also released a recording in which the president and his wife are mentioned several times.
