= Korean Wave Union Party =

Political party in South Korea

- Leader: Kim Young-jong
- Founded: January 16, 2021
- Registered: January 26, 2021
- Headquarters: 64, Nonhyeon-ro, Gangnam-gu, Seoul
- Membership (2024): 9,317
- Ideology: Single issue promotion of culture and arts
- Political position: Big tent
- Colors: Purple
- Slogan: 새로운 시대! 새로운 나라! 새로운 사람! ('New Era! new country! new person!')
- National Assembly: 0 / 300
- Metropolitan Mayors and Governors: 0 / 16
- Municipal Mayors: 0 / 227
- Provincial and Metropolitan Councillors: 0 / 933
- Municipal Councillors: 0 / 3,034

Website
- k-wave21.kr

Korean name
- Hangul: 한류연합당
- Hanja: 韓流聯合黨
- RR: Hallyu yeonhapdang
- MR: Hallyu yŏnhaptang

The Korean Wave Union Party (Korean: 한류연합당) is a South Korean political party founded in 2021.

It was founded by Kim Min-chan, who had run as an independent candidate in the 2017 South Korean presidential election.

== Election results ==
=== Presidential ===
Year	Election	Candidate	Votes	Vote share	Result	Outcome
2022	20th	Kim Min-chan	17,305	0.05%	8th	Lost

=== National Assembly ===
Year	Election	Constituency		Proportional representation		Total seats	
Year	Election	Seats won	Seat share	Seats won	Vote share	Seats won	Seat share
2024	22nd	0 / 254	0%	0 / 46	0.01%	0 / 300	0%

=== Local ===
Year	Election	Metropolitan mayors/governors		Municipal mayors/heads		Metropolitan/provincial councils		Municipal councils	
Year	Election	Seats won	Share	Seats won	Share	Seats won	Share	Seats won	Share
2022	8th	0/17	0%	0/226	0%	0/872	0%	0/2,988	0%
