= Unification Korea Party =

Political party in South Korea

- Leader: Lee Gyeoung-hee
- Founded: May 21, 2021
- Registered: June 4, 2021
- Preceded by: Korea National Party
- Headquarters: Hwigyeong-ro 2-gil, Dongdaemun-gu, Seoul
- Membership (2024): 12,002
- Colors: Blue
- National Assembly: 0 / 300
- Metropolitan Mayors and Governors: 0 / 16
- Municipal Mayors: 0 / 227
- Provincial and Metropolitan Councillors: 0 / 933
- Municipal Councillors: 0 / 3,034

Website
- unikoreaparty.kr

Korean name
- Hangul: 통일한국당
- Hanja: 統一韓國黨
- RR: Tongil hangukdang
- MR: T'ongil han'guktang

The Unification Korea Party (Korean: 통일한국당) is a South Korean political party founded in 2021.

Lee Gyeoung-hee, who ran in the 2017 South Korean presidential election, left the Korea National Party and founded the Unification Korea Party.

For the 2022 South Korean presidential election, the party elected its leader, Lee Gyeoung-hee, as its official candidate.

== Electoral history ==
=== Presidential elections ===
| Year | Election | Candidate | Votes | Vote share | Result | Outcome |
|---|---|---|---|---|---|---|
| 2022 | 20th presidential election | Lee Gyeoung-hee | 11,708 | 0.03% | 9th | Not elected |

=== National Assembly elections ===
| Year | Election | Constituency | | Proportional representation | | Total | |
| Year | Election | Seats won | Vote share | Seats won | Vote share | Seats won | Vote share |
|---|---|---|---|---|---|---|---|
| 2024 | 22nd legislative election | 0/254 | 0% | 0/46 | 0.03% | 0/300 | 0% |

=== Local elections ===
| Year | Election | Metropolitan mayors and governors | | Basic local government heads | | Metropolitan councilors | | Basic councilors | |
| Year | Election | Seats won | Vote share | Seats won | Vote share | Seats won | Vote share | Seats won | Vote share |
|---|---|---|---|---|---|---|---|---|---|
| 2022 | 8th local elections | 0/17 | 0% | 0/226 | 0% | 0/872 | 0% | 0/2,988 | 0% |
