= K-Political Innovation Union Party =

2022–2024 political party in South Korea

- Leader: Lee Rae-kyung
- Founded: September 30, 2022
- Dissolved: June 9, 2024
- Split from: Democratic Party of Korea; New Wave
- Headquarters: Seoul Yeongdeungpo-gu 26, Gukjegeumyung-ro 6-gil, 6th floor (Yeouido-dong)
- Ideology: Reformism
- Political position: Center-left
- Colors: Dark Blue; Historical: Green; Lime

Website
- kjhy.kr (archived)

Korean name
- Hangul: K정치혁신연합당
- Hanja: K政治革新聯合黨
- RR: K jeongchi hyeoksin yeonhapdang
- MR: K chŏngch'i hyŏksin yŏnhaptang

The K-Political Innovation Union Party (Korean: K정치혁신연합당) was a South Korean political party founded in 2022. Originally established under the name "Brighter Future Party" (Korean: 더밝은미래당; Hanja: 더밝은未來黨), it changed its name after the Preparatory Committee for the K-Political Innovation Union merged with it in 2024. On the ballot for the 2024 South Korean legislative election, it was listed as K-Political Innovation Union Party in accordance with the alphabetical order of party names. The party announced its dissolution following the election.

== Election results ==
=== National Assembly elections ===
Election results
Year	Election	Constituency		Proportional representation		Total seats	
Year	Election	Seats won	Vote share	Seats won	Vote share	Seats won	Vote share
2024	22nd	0/254	0%	0/46	0.01%	0/300	0%

== Logos ==
Logo of the Brighter Future Party (2022-2024)

Logo of the K-Political Innovation Union Party (2024)
