= People Union (South Korea) =

Political party in South Korea

- Leader: Kim Hyun-wook
- Secretary-General: Oh Hee-joo
- Founded: April 15, 2017
- Registered: April 15, 2017
- Headquarters: 125, Samcheong-ro, Jongno-gu, Seoul
- Membership (2024): 9,717
- Ideology: Moderate conservatism
- Political position: Centre-right
- Colors: Magenta; Dark Blue; Gray; Purple

Website
- https://xn--3e0b39yophy6p.kr/

Korean name
- Hangul: 국민연합
- Hanja: 國民聯合
- RR: Gungmin yeonhap
- MR: Kungmin yŏnhap

The People Union (Korean: 국민연합) is a centrist reformist conservative party in South Korea founded in 2017.

== History ==
On 15 April 2017, it was founded as the Federation of People's Hope, centred around Shin Jae-hon, formerly of the United Korea Party, and later changed its name to the National New Political Party on 29 August 2017. Subsequently, on 16 June 2021, it changed its name to the New Korean Peninsula Party. Later on 25 September 2024, it changed its name to the People Union.

== Logos ==
Logo of the Federation of People's Hope (2017)

Logo of the National New Political Party (2017–2021)

Logo of the New Korean Peninsula Party (2021–2024)

Logo of the People Union (2024–)
