= Opinion polling for the 2024 South Korean legislative election =

There have been several opinion polls conducted for the 2024 South Korean legislative election. For more information, visit the National Election Survey Deliberation Committee of Korea.

== Constituency votes ==
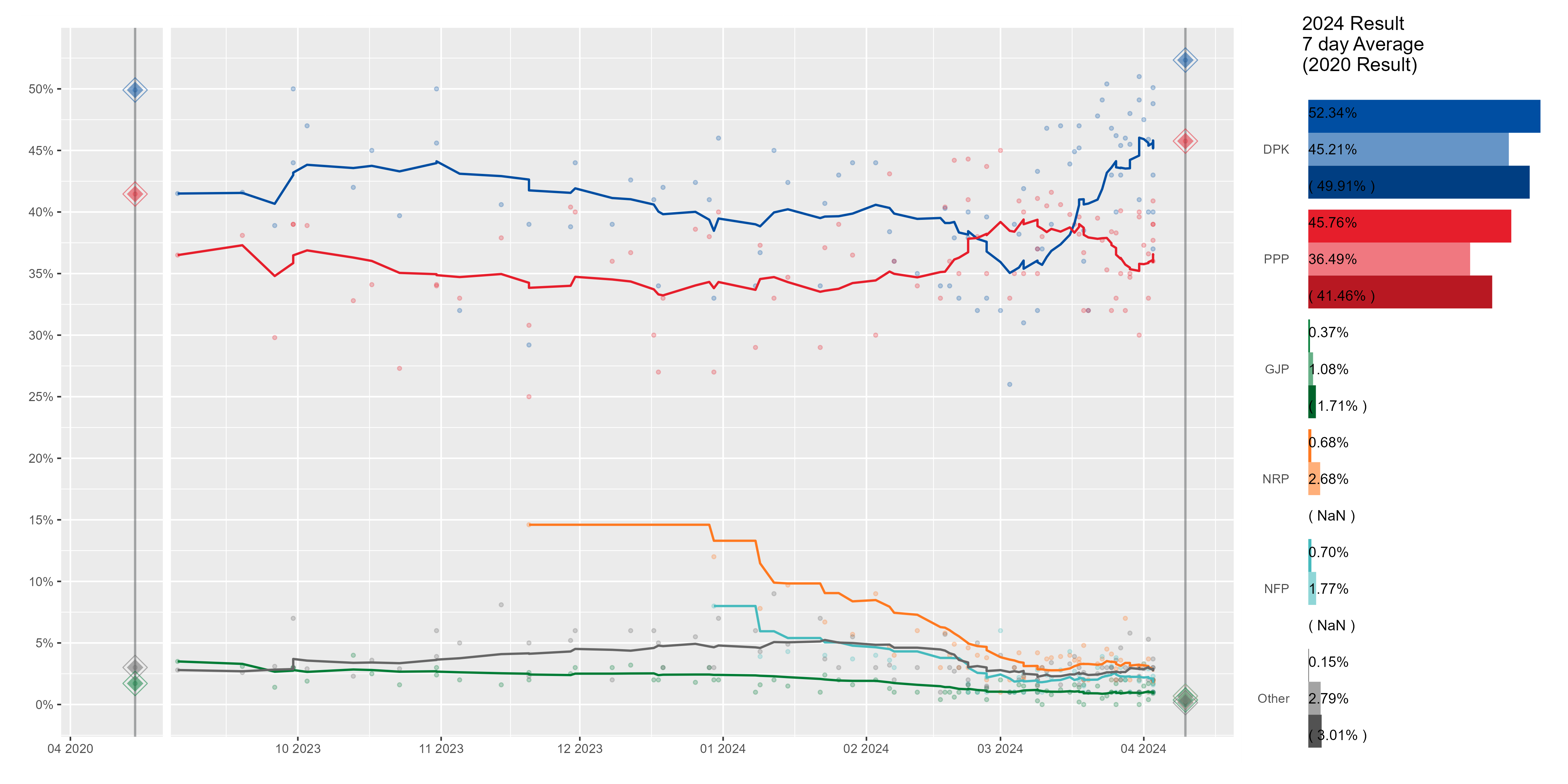
7 day moving average curve of the polling for the constituency vote with a 7-day average bar chart.

=== 2024 ===
Color key:

Poll conducted after legal ban on opinion polls

Fieldwork date	Sample size	Margin of error	Polling firm	DP	PPP	GJP	NRP	NFP	RKP	Others	Ind.	Und./ no ans.	Lead
10 Apr 2024	2024 elections			52.34	45.76	0.37	0.68	0.7	—N/a	0.15	—N/a	—N/a	6.58
2-3 Apr 2024	1,000	±3.1	Research view	50.1	40.9	0.9	1.9	2.3	—N/a	1.0	—N/a	2.8	9.2
2-3 Apr 2024	1,002	±3.1	Korea Research / MBC	40	36	1	2	1	—N/a	3	—N/a	18	4
2-3 Apr 2024	1,000	±3.1	Everyresearch / NewsSpirit	48.8	37.7	1.7	1.9	1.6	—N/a	3.7	—N/a	4.7	11.1
1-3 Apr 2024	1,002	±3.1	Ipsos / SBS	43	39	1	2	2	—N/a	2	—N/a	9	4
1-3 Apr 2024	1,004	±3.1	Embrain Public, KStat Research, Korea Research, Hankook Research	37	39	1	2	1	—N/a	3	—N/a	17	2
1-2 Apr 2024	1,001	±3.1	Gongjung / Dailian	45.9	36.6	1.7	3.7	2.9	—N/a	5.3	—N/a	3.9	9.3
30 Mar-2 Apr 2024	5,000	±1.4	Hankook Research / KBS	40	33	0.4	1	1	—N/a	2	—N/a	23	7
30 Mar-1 Apr 2024	2,033	±2.2	Jowon C&I / Straight News	47.5	37.3	1.5	3.3	3.3	—N/a	2.9	—N/a	4.2	10.2
30-31 Mar 2024	1,000	±3.1	Metrix / Yonhap News	41	30	0	3	1	—N/a	1	—N/a	24	11
30-31 Mar 2024	1,006	±3.1	Media Tomato / News Tomato	49.1	39.6	0.8	2.0	1.9	—N/a	2.3	—N/a	4.2	9.5
29-31 Mar 2024	1,000	±3.1	Research view	51	40	1	3	2	—N/a	1	—N/a	1	11
28-29 Mar 2024	1,004	±3.1	Research&Research / Dong-a Ilbo	45.5	34.7	—N/a	—N/a	—N/a	—N/a	5.8	—N/a	14.0	10.8
28-29 Mar 2024	1,011	±3.1	Gallup Korea / Seoul Economic Daily	48	35	1	2	1	—N/a	3	2	9	13
25-28 Mar 2024	1,171	±2.9	Korea Research / MBC	46	32	2	7	2	—N/a	3	—N/a	7	14
26-27 Mar 2024	1,001	±3.1	Korea Research / MBC	43	35	1	2	2	—N/a	2	—N/a	16	8
25-27 Mar 2024	4,041	±1.5	Jowon C&I / Herald	45.4	40.1	1.0	3.6	3.0	—N/a	4.6	—N/a	1.7	5.3
25-26 Mar 2024	1,002	±3.1	Gongjung / Fntoday, The Public	46.2	38.3	1.7	2.9	3.8	—N/a	3.6	—N/a	3.4	7.9
24-26 Mar 2024	3,000	±1.8	Hankook Research / KBS	40	33	0	2	1	—N/a	2	—N/a	22	7
24-25 Mar 2024	1,003	±3.1	Embrain Public / YTN	43	32	1	2	2	—N/a	3	—N/a	18	11
23-25 Mar 2024	2,015	±2.2	JowonC&I / Straight News	46.8	38.4	1.0	4.1	3.1	—N/a	3.0	—N/a	3.7	8.4
23-24 Mar 2024	1,005	±3.1	Media Tomato / News Tomato	50.4	35.3	0.7	4.5	2.4	—N/a	3.0	—N/a	3.7	15.1
22-23 Mar 2024	1,002	±3.1	Flower Research	49.1	37.7	0.5	3.7	3.9	—N/a	3.0	—N/a	2.1	11.4
21–22 Mar 2024	1,016	±3.1	Rnsearch	47.8	39.5	1.5	3.3	3.0	—N/a	2.5	—N/a	2.2	8.3
18–20 Mar 2024	1,001	±3.1	Embrain Public, KStat Research, Korea Research, Hankook Research	32	32	1	2	1	5	1	—N/a	25	Tie
18–19 Mar 2024	1,001	±3.1	Gongjung / Dailian	38.5	36.7	1.6	4.8	1.5	9.3	2.6	—N/a	5.1	1.8
17–19 Mar 2024	3,000	±1.8	Hankook Research / KBS	36	32	0	2	1	4	2	—N/a	23	4
16–18 Mar 2024	2,027	±2.2	Jowon C&I / Straight News	47.0	39.6	1.4	3.7	2.4	—N/a	3.0	—N/a	3.0	7.4
16–18 Mar 2024	1,008	±3.1	Hangil Research / Kukinews	45.2	38.2	0.2	3.4	2.0	—N/a	1.6	1.9	7.5	7.0
16–17 Mar 2024	1,023	±3.1	Media Tomato / News Tomato	44.9	39.0	1.6	3.6	2.7	—N/a	3.9	—N/a	4.2	5.9
15–16 Mar 2024	1,068	±3.0	Rnsearch / Asia Today	43.9	39.8	1.0	4.0	4.3	—N/a	3.3	—N/a	3.6	4.1
13–14 Mar 2024	1,004	±3.1	Rnsearch	47.0	40.6	1.2	3.9	2.8	—N/a	1.6	—N/a	3.0	6.4
12 Mar 2024	1,000	±3.1	Gongjung / Fntoday, The Public	39.0	41.6	0.8	3.8	2.2	5.4	3.4	—N/a	3.8	2.6
9–11 Mar 2024	2,000	±2.2	Jowon C&I / Straight News	46.8	40.5	1.1	3.7	2.4	—N/a	2.7	—N/a	2.9	6.3
8–10 Mar 2024	1,000	±3.1	Korea Research / MBC	37	38	0	3	1	—N/a	3	—N/a	3.6	1
8–9 Mar 2024	1,005	±3.1	Rnsearch / Asia Today	43.3	41.1	1.6	4.2	2.8	—N/a	2.0	—N/a	5.1	2.2
7–9 Mar 2024	2,009	±2.2	Meta Voice / JTBC	37	37	1	3	1	4	2 (Note: Progressive Party – 1, New Progressive Alliance – 0, Others – 1)	—N/a	15	Tie
7–9 Mar 2024	3,000	±1.8	Hankook Research / KBS	32	35	0.3	1	1	3	1.5 (Note: Progressive Party 0.4, – New Progressive Alliance 0.1, Others 1)	—N/a	27	3
5–6 Mar 2024	1,004	±3.1	Rnsearch	41.9	40.0	1.5	2.2	2.5	5.2	2.3	—N/a	4.4	1.9
4–6 Mar 2024	1,000	±3.1	Embrain Public, KStat Research, Korea Research, Hankook Research	31	35	1	2	1	4	—N/a	—N/a	24	4
4–5 Mar 2024	1,000	±3.1	Gongjung / Dailian	38.2	40.9	1.6	4.2	2.2	5.4	2.0	—N/a	5.6	2.7
3–4 Mar 2024	1,004	±3.1	Embrain Public / YTN	39	35	1	3	1	—N/a	3	—N/a	19	4
2–3 Mar 2024	1,000	±3.1	Metrix / Yonhap News	26	33	1	2	1	3	1	—N/a	32	7
3 March 2024	Rebuilding Korea Party established												
26 Feb–1 Mar 2024	1,216	±2.8	Korea Research / MBC	32	45	2	1	6	3	4	—N/a	9	19
26–27 Feb 2024	1,005	±3.1	Gongjung / Fntoday, The Public	39.6	43.7	1.3	3.8	2.2	4.6	1.4	—N/a	3.6	4.1
25–27 Feb 2024	3,003	±1.8	Hankook Research / KBS	33	35	0.4	2	1	2	1.5 (Note: Progressive Party 1, – New Progressive Alliance 0.0, Others 0.5)	—N/a	26	2
24–25 Feb 2024	1,021	±3.1	Meta Voice / JTBC	32	38	1	4	1	—N/a	5 (Note: Progressive Party – 2, New Progressive Alliance – 1, Others – 2)	—N/a	20	6
22–23 Feb 2024	1,015	±3.1	Gallup Korea / Seoul Economic Daily	40	41	1	3	1	—N/a	2	3	10	1
22–23 Feb 2024	1,001	±3.1	Gongjung / Fntoday, The Public	37.9	44.3	1.6	4.6	1.7	4.9	1.6	—N/a	3.4	6.4
19–21 Feb 2024	1,005	±3.1	Embrain Public, KStat Research, Korea Research, Hankook Research	33	35	1	3	—N/a	—N/a	3	—N/a	25	2
20 February 2024	New Reform splits into New Reform and New Future												
19–20 Feb 2024	1,001	±3.1	Gongjung / Dailian	37.9	44.2	0.6	4.9	—N/a	3.8	2.7	—N/a	5.9	6.3
18–19 Feb 2024	1,001	±3.1	Embrain Public / YTN	34	36	1	4	—N/a	—N/a	3	—N/a	23	2
16–18 Feb 2024	5,004	±1.4	Realmeter / NewsSpirit	40.3	40.4	1.0	5.8	—N/a	—N/a	5.7 (Note: Liberal Unification Party – 2.0, Progressive Party 1.3, – New Progressive Alliance 1.0, Others 1.4)	1.9	4.7	0.1
15–17 Feb 2024	3,000	±1.8	Hankook Research / KBS	34	33	0.4	3	—N/a	—N/a	1	—N/a	28	1
11–12 Feb 2024	1,004	±3.1	Meta Voice / JTBC	35	34	1	6	—N/a	—N/a	3 (Note: New Progressive Alliance – 1, Progressive Party – 1, Others – 1)	—N/a	21	1
9 February 2024	New Future-New Reform merger												
6–7 Feb 2024	1,001	±3.1	Embrain Public / YTN	36	36	1	4	3	—N/a	2	—N/a	19	Tie
5–6 Feb 2024	1,001	±3.1	Gongjung / Dailian	38.4	43.1	1.3	4.7	3.6	—N/a	3.2	—N/a	5.6	4.7
4 February 2024	New Future established as a short-lived political party												
30 Jan – 3 Feb 2024	1,265	±2.8	Korea Research / MBC	44	30	2	9	4	—N/a	3	—N/a	8	14
30 January 2024	Green–Justice electoral alliance formed												
27–29 Jan 2024	2,006	±2.2	Jowon C&I / Straight News	44.0	36.5	1.6	5.7	3.7	—N/a	5.5	—N/a	2.9	7.5
25–26 Jan 2024	1,011	±3.1	Gallup Korea / Seoul Economic Daily	43	39	2	—N/a	—N/a	—N/a	3	2	12	4
22–23 Jan 2024	1,004	±3.1	Gongjung / Dailian	40.7	37.1	2.4	6.7	4.0	—N/a	3.7	—N/a	5.4	3.6
21–22 Jan 2024	1,000	±3.0	Embrain Public / YTN	34	29	1	—N/a	—N/a	—N/a	7	—N/a	28	5
20 January 2024	New Reform established.												
13–15 Jan 2024	2,002	±2.2	Jowon C&I / Straight News	42.4	34.7	1.5	9.7	4.3	—N/a	4.9	—N/a	2.5	7.7
10–12 Jan 2024	1,314	±2.7	Korea Research / MBC	45	33	2	—N/a	—N/a	—N/a	9	—N/a	10	12
8–9 Jan 2024	1,002	±3.1	Gongjung / Dailian	36.7	37.3	1.6	7.8	3.9	—N/a	4.3	—N/a	8.3	0.6
7–8 Jan 2024	1,002	±3.1	Embrain Public / YTN	34	29	1	—N/a	—N/a	—N/a	6	—N/a	30	5
2 January 2024	Attempted assassination of Lee Jae-myung												

=== 2023 ===
Fieldwork date	Sample size	Margin of error	Polling firm	DP	PPP	JP	NRP	NFP	RKP	Others	Ind.	Und./ no ans.	Lead
29–31 Dec 2023	1,000	±3.1	Research view	46	40	2	—N/a	—N/a	—N/a	7	—N/a	5	6
29–30 Dec 2023	1,001	±3.1	Ipsos / SBS	33	27	2	12	8	—N/a	3	—N/a	15	6
28–29 Dec 2023	1,017	±3.1	Gallup Korea / JoongAngIlbo	41	38	3	—N/a	—N/a	—N/a	3	3	11	3
25–26 Dec 2023	1,015	±3.1	Gongjung / Dailian	42.4	38.6	1.8	—N/a	—N/a	—N/a	5.5	3.6	8.1	3.8
18–19 Dec 2023	1,008	±3.1	Gallup Korea / Seoul Economic Daily	42	33	3	—N/a	—N/a	—N/a	3	4	14	9
17–18 Dec 2023	1,006	±3.1	Embrain Public / YTN	34	27	2	—N/a	—N/a	—N/a	5	—N/a	33	7
13–17 Dec 2023	1,508	±2.5	Korea Research / MBC	41	30	2	—N/a	—N/a	—N/a	6	—N/a	21	11
11–12 Dec 2023	1,000	±3.1	Gongjung / Dailian	42.6	36.7	3.2	—N/a	—N/a	—N/a	6.0	3.4	8.1	5.9
7–8 Dec 2023	1,033	±3.0	Gallup Korea / Kookmin Ilbo	39	36	3	—N/a	—N/a	—N/a	2	5	16	3
28–30 Nov 2023	1,000	±3.1	Research view	44	40	3	—N/a	—N/a	—N/a	6	—N/a	7	4
28–29 Nov 2023	1,002	±3.1	Gongjung / Dailian	38.8	40.4	2.5	—N/a	—N/a	—N/a	5.2	4.2	9.0	1.6
19–20 Nov 2023	1,000	±3.1	Embrain Public / YTN	39	25	2	—N/a	—N/a	—N/a	5	—N/a	30	14
18–20 Nov 2023	2,018	±2.2	Jowon C&I / Straight News	29.2	30.8	2.6	14.6	—N/a	11.2	2.3	—N/a	9.3	1.6
13–14 Nov 2023	1,001	±3.1	Gongjung / Dailian	40.6	37.9	1.6	—N/a	—N/a	—N/a	8.1	3.3	8.5	2.7
4–5 Nov 2023	1,000	±3.1	Metrix / Yonhap News	32	33	2	—N/a	—N/a	—N/a	5	—N/a	28	1
30–31 Oct 2023	1,000	±3.1	Research view	50	34	3	—N/a	—N/a	—N/a	6	—N/a	7	16
30–31 Oct 2023	1,001	±3.1	Gongjung / Dailian	45.6	34.1	2.4	—N/a	—N/a	—N/a	3.9	3.9	10.0	11.5
22–23 Oct 2023	1,004	±3.1	Embrain Public / YTN	39.7	27.3	1.6	—N/a	—N/a	—N/a	2.9	—N/a	28.5	12.4
16–17 Oct 2023	1,002	±3.1	Gongjung / Dailian	45.0	34.1	2.5	—N/a	—N/a	—N/a	3.6	4.9	9.8	10.9
12–13 Oct 2023	1,013	±3.1	Gallup Korea / Seoul Economic Daily	42.0	32.8	4.0	—N/a	—N/a	—N/a	2.3	3.6	15.2	9.2
2–3 Oct 2023	1,000	±3.1	Gongjung / Dailian	47.0	38.9	1.9	—N/a	—N/a	—N/a	2.9	2.2	7.1	8.1
29–30 Sep 2023	1,000	±3.1	Research view	50	39	3	—N/a	—N/a	—N/a	3	—N/a	4	11
25–26 Sep 2023	1,002	±3.1	Embrain Public / YTN	38.9	29.8	1.4	—N/a	—N/a	—N/a	3.1	—N/a	26.8	9.1
18–19 Sep 2023	1,000	±3.1	Gongjung / Dailian	41.6	38.1	3.1	—N/a	—N/a	—N/a	2.6	3.9	10.7	3.5
4–5 Sep 2023	1,001	±3.1	Gongjung / Dailian	41.5	36.5	3.5	—N/a	—N/a	—N/a	2.8	3.9	11.9	5.0
29–30 Sep 2023	1,000	±3.1	Research view	44	39	3	—N/a	—N/a	—N/a	7	—N/a	8	5
15 April 2020	2020 elections			49.91	41.46	1.71	—	—	—	3.01	3.91	—	8.45

== Proportional votes ==
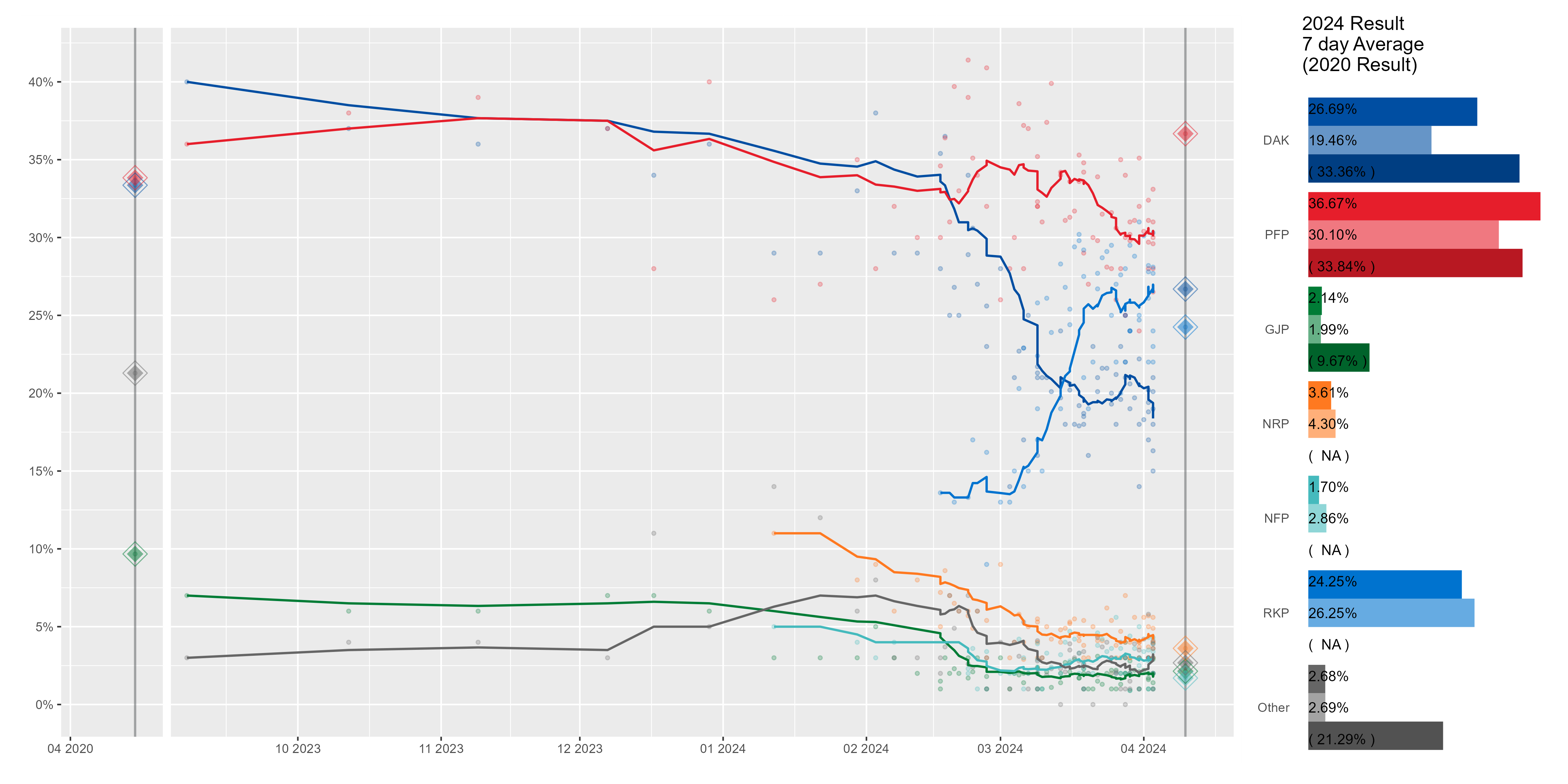
7 day moving average curve of the polling for the proportional vote with a 7-day average bar chart.

=== 2024 ===
Color key:

Poll conducted after legal ban on opinion polls

Fieldwork date	Sample size	Margin of error	Polling firm	DAK	PFP	GJP	LUP	NRP	NFP	RKP	Others	Und./ no ans.	Lead
10 Apr 2024	2024 elections			26.69	36.67	2.14	2.26	3.61	1.70	24.25	2.68	—N/a	9.98
2-3 Apr 2024	1,000	±3.1	Research view	19.0	33.1	2.0	—N/a	4.9	3.9	28.1	3.6	5.4	5.0
2-3 Apr 2024	1,002	±3.1	Korea Research / MBC	18	28	2	2	4	2	22	1	22	6
2-3 Apr 2024	1,004	±3.1	Realmeter / EKN	16.3	29.6	1.4	5.9	5.6	3.4	30.3	4.1	3.5	0.7
2-3 Apr 2024	1,000	±3.1	Everyresearch / NewsSpirit	20.1	26.5	2.9	4.7	3.6	4.3	27.7	3.9	6.4	1.2
1-3 Apr 2024	1,002	±3.1	Ipsos / SBS	21	30	3	3	4	2	24	2	13	6
1-3 Apr 2024	1,004	±3.1	Embrain Public, KStat Research, Korea Research, Hankook Research	15	31	1	—N/a	3	1	23	3	23	8
1-2 Apr 2024	1,000	±3.1	Realmeter/ Media Tribune	19.4	31.1	2.0	4.3	5.0	2.8	28.2	3.0	4.0	2.9
1-2 Apr 2024	1,001	±3.1	Gongjung / Dailian	18.8	29.7	1.6	5.4	5.7	3.5	27.8	3.0	4.6	1.9
1-2 Apr 2024	1,002	±3.1	Media Research / Newspim	20.2	32.4	1.7	—N/a	3.7	4.3	26.1	5.8	5.8	6.3
30 Mar-2 Apr 2024	5,000	±1.4	Hankook Research / KBS	17	28	1	—N/a	3	1	22	3	26	6
30 Mar-1 Apr 2024	2,033	±2.2	Jowon C&I / Straight News	18.3	30.4	2.2	—N/a	5.6	3.4	30.1	4.2	5.8	0.3
30-31 Mar 2024	1,000	±3.1	Metrix / Yonhap News	14	24	1	1	4	1	25	1	29	1
30-31 Mar 2024	1,006	±3.1	Media Tomato / News Tomato	22.2	35.1	2.1	—N/a	3.7	2.5	24.7	3.5	6.2	10.4
29-31 Mar 2024	1,000	±3.1	Research view	18	32	3	—N/a	4	5	31	3	5	1
29-30 Mar 2024	1,000	±3.1	Flower Research	19.7	31.1	2.2	—N/a	5.6	3.6	28.8	3.9	5.2	2.3
28-29 Mar 2024	1,004	±3.1	Research&Research / Dong-a Ilbo	20.6	29.8	2.8	3.0	3.0	0.9	24.0	2.0	14.1	5.8
28-29 Mar 2024	1,004	±3.1	Realmeter / EKN	19.0	30.2	0.9	5.0	4.0	4.4	29.5	1.5	5.4	0.7
28-29 Mar 2024	1,011	±3.1	Gallup Korea / Seoul Economic Daily	24	31	2	2	3	2	24	1	11	7
27-28 Mar 2024	1,004	±3.1	Ace Research / Newsis	25	30	2	—N/a	4	4	28	3	4	2
26-28 Mar 2024	1,001	±3.1	Gallup Korea	22	34	2	2	4	2	22	0	13	12
25-28 Mar 2024	1,171	±2.9	Korea Research / MBC	21	25	3	4	7	3	25	1	12	Tie
26-27 Mar 2024	1,001	±3.1	Korea Research / MBC	23	28	2	2	3	2	20	1	20	5
25-27 Mar 2024	4,041	±1.5	Jowon C&I / Herald	19.6	35.0	1.3	—N/a	4.7	3.6	27.6	4.0	4.2	7.4
25-26 Mar 2024	1,002	±3.1	Gongjung / Fntoday, The Public	21.2	30.6	2.2	4.8	3.8	5.6	27.0	2.1	2.8	3.6
24-26 Mar 2024	3,000	±1.8	Hankook Research / KBS	18	26	1	—N/a	3	2	22	2	27	4
24-25 Mar 2024	1,003	±3.1	Embrain Public / YTN	20	28	1	—N/a	2	2	25	3	20	3
23-25 Mar 2024	2,015	±2.2	JowonC&I / Straight News	19.3	31.6	2.2	—N/a	5.4	3.6	29.5	3.0	5.5	2.1
23-24 Mar 2024	1,005	±3.1	Media Tomato / News Tomato	21.6	28.1	2.0	—N/a	6.2	3.4	29.1	4.0	5.6	1.0
22-23 Mar 2024	1,002	±3.1	Flower Research	21.6	31.5	1.3	—N/a	4.1	4.2	28.7	3.7	4.8	2.8
21–22 Mar 2024	1,004	±3.1	Realmeter / EKN	20.1	29.8	3.1	2.8	4.1	4.6	27.7	1.9	5.9	2.1
21–22 Mar 2024	1,016	±3.1	Rnsearch	21.0	33.9	1.5	—N/a	4.4	3.8	26.7	4.3	4.2	7.2
19-21 Mar 2024	1,001	±3.1	Gallup Korea	23	30	1	2	5	2	22	0	15	7
18–20 Mar 2024	1,001	±3.1	Embrain Public, KStat Research, Korea Research, Hankook Research	16	27	1	—N/a	3	2	19	2	30	8
18–19 Mar 2024	1,001	±3.1	Gongjung / Dailian	18.7	34.2	2.3	—N/a	5.4	2.3	29.2	3.4	4.5	5.0
17–19 Mar 2024	3,000	±1.8	Hankook Research / KBS	18	29	1	—N/a	3	1	21	1	25	8
18–19 Mar 2024	1,000	±3.1	Media Research / Newspim	18.5	34.8	2.0	—N/a	3.8	2.6	27.5	2.6	8.2	7.3
16–18 Mar 2024	2,027	±2.2	Jowon C&I / Straight News	19.2	35.3	1.7	—N/a	4.4	3.3	30.2	2.8	3.1	5.1
16–18 Mar 2024	1,008	±3.1	Hangil Research / Kukinews	17.9	33.6	1.7	—N/a	4.1	2.0	29.8	3.3	7.6	3.8
16–17 Mar 2024	1,023	±3.1	Media Tomato / News Tomato	18.0	31.7	2.9	—N/a	5.5	4.2	29.4	3.0	5.3	2.3
15–16 Mar 2024	1,000	±3.1	Everyresearch / NewsSpirit	20.6	31.3	2.1	3.0	5.2	4.7	24.4	3.9	4.7	6.9
15–16 Mar 2024	1,068	±3.0	Rnsearch / Asia Today	20.2	33.6	2.7	—N/a	5.3	2.8	25.4	3.5	6.5	8.2
14–15 Mar 2024	1,000	±3.1	Realmeter / EKN	18.0	31.1	2.7	4.2	4.9	4.0	26.8	2.1	6.2	4.3
13–14 Mar 2024	1,004	±3.1	Rnsearch	19.7	34.2	1.4	—N/a	4.8	3.2	28.3	2.3	6.1	5.9
12–14 Mar 2024	1,002	±3.1	Gallup Korea	24	34	2	1	4	2	19	0	14	10
12 Mar 2024	1,000	±3.1	Gongjung / Fntoday, The Public	20.1	39.9	1.1	2.6	4.2	2.4	23.9	2.3	3.5	16.0
9–11 Mar 2024	2,000	±2.2	JowonC&I / Straight News	21.0	37.4	2.1	—N/a	5.0	3.3	26.1	1.9	3.1	11.3
8–10 Mar 2024	1,000	±3.1	Korea Research / MBC	21	31	1	—N/a	3	1	15	3	24	10
8–9 Mar 2024	1,004	±3.1	Flower Research	21.3	32.3	2.4	—N/a	5.5	2.9	25.8	4.1	5.7	6.5
8–9 Mar 2024	1,005	±3.1	Rnsearch / Asia Today	21.7	35.2	2.3	—N/a	5.3	3.9	22.4	2.8	6.4	12.8
7–9 Mar 2024	2,009	±2.2	Meta Voice / JTBC	21	32	2	—N/a	4	2	19	2	19	11
7–9 Mar 2024	3,000	±1.8	Hankook Research / KBS	16	32	1	—N/a	3	1	17	1	29	15
5–7 Mar 2024	1,000	±3.1	Gallup Korea	25	37	2	—N/a	5	2	15	1	13	12
5–6 Mar 2024	1,004	±3.1	Rnsearch	22.9	37.2	1.4	—N/a	2.9	3.0	22.9	5.3	4.5	14.3
4–6 Mar 2024	1,000	±3.1	Embrain Public, KStat Research, Korea Research, Hankook Research	17	28	2	—N/a	4	1	14	—N/a	31	9
4–5 Mar 2024	1,000	±3.1	Gongjung / Dailian	22.7	38.6	1.9	—N/a	5.8	4.2	20.3	3.1	3.4	15.9
3–4 Mar 2024	1,004	±3.1	Embrain Public / YTN	21	30	2	—N/a	4	2	15	4	24	9
2–3 Mar 2024	1,000	±3.1	Metrix / Yonhap News	14	28	1	—N/a	3	2	13	1	38	14
3 March 2024	Rebuilding Korea Party established												
26 Feb–1 Mar 2024	1,216	±2.8	Korea Research / MBC	28	26	3	—N/a	9	2	13	4	13	2
26–27 Feb 2024	1,005	±3.1	Gongjung / Fntoday, The Public	25.6	40.9	1.8	—N/a	5.4	3.4	16.2	3.0	3.7	15.3
25–27 Feb 2024	3,003	±1.8	Hankook Research / KBS	23	32	1	—N/a	3	1	9	1	29	9
24–25 Feb 2024	1,021	±3.1	Meta Voice / JTBC	27	34	3	—N/a	6	1	—N/a	6	22	7
23–24 Feb 2024	1,009	±3.1	Flower Research	30.6	35.1	2.1	—N/a	4.9	3.6	17.0	2.4	4.3	4.5
22–23 Feb 2024	1,015	±3.1	Gallup Korea / Seoul Economic Daily	34	39	3	—N/a	6	2	—N/a	7	9	5
22–23 Feb 2024	1,001	±3.1	Gongjung / Fntoday, The Public	28.9	41.4	1.7	—N/a	5.7	2.3	13.3	2.6	4.0	12.5
19–21 Feb 2024	1,005	±3.1	Embrain Public, KStat Research, Korea Research, Hankook Research	25	33	2	—N/a	6	—N/a	—N/a	6	29	8
20 February 2024	New Reform splits into New Reform and New Future												
19–20 Feb 2024	1,001	±3.1	Gongjung / Dailian	26.8	39.7	2.3	—N/a	6.5	—N/a	13.0	4.9	6.9	12.9
18–19 Feb 2024	1,001	±3.1	Embrain Public / YTN	25	31	2	—N/a	7	—N/a	—N/a	7	29	6
16–18 Feb 2024	5,004	±1.4	Realmeter / NewsSpirit	36.5	36.4	3.0	3.4	8.6	—N/a	—N/a	3.7	8.3	0.1
16–17 Feb 2024	1,002	±3.1	Flower Research	35.4	34.6	1.5	—N/a	7.2	—N/a	13.6	3.0	4.6	0.8
15–17 Feb 2024	3,000	±1.8	Hankook Research / KBS	28	30	1	—N/a	5	—N/a	—N/a	2	32	2
11–12 Feb 2024	1,004	±3.1	Meta Voice / JTBC	29	30	2	—N/a	8	—N/a	—N/a	3 (Note: Progressive Party – 2, Others – 1)	28	1
9 February 2024	New Future-New Reform merger												
6–7 Feb 2024	1,001	±3.1	Embrain Public / YTN	29	32	3	—N/a	6	4	—N/a	3	22	3
4 February 2024	New Future established as a short-lived political party												
30 Jan–3 Feb 2024	1,265	±2.8	Korea Research / MBC	38	28	5	—N/a	9	3	—N/a	8	9	10
30 January 2024	Green–Justice electoral alliance formed												
29–30 Jan 2024	1,004	±3.1	Gallup Korea / The Segye Times	33	35	3	—N/a	8	4	—N/a	6	11	2
21–22 Jan 2024	1,000	±3.0	Embrain Public / YTN	29	27	3	—N/a	—N/a	—N/a	—N/a	12	29	2
20 January 2024	New Reform established												
10–12 Jan 2024	1,314	±2.7	Korea Research / MBC	29	26	3	—N/a	11	5	—N/a	14	15	3
2 January 2024	Attempted assassination of Lee Jae-myung.												

=== 2023 ===
Fieldwork date	Sample size	Margin of error	Polling firm	DAK	PFP	GJP	LUP	Others	Und./ no ans.	Lead
28–29 Dec 2023	1,017	±3.1	Gallup Korea / JoongAngIlbo	36	40	6	—N/a	5	12	4
13–17 Dec 2023	1,508	±2.5	Korea Research / MBC	34	28	7	—N/a	11	20	6
5–7 Dec 2023	1,000	±3.1	Gallup Korea	37	37	7	—N/a	3	17	Tie
7–9 Nov 2023	1,001	±3.0	Gallup Korea	36	39	6	—N/a	4	16	3
10–12 Oct 2023	1,002	±3.1	Gallup Korea	37	38	6	—N/a	4	15	1
5–7 Sep 2023	1,000	±3.1	Gallup Korea	40	36	7	—N/a	3	14	4
15 April 2020	2020 elections			33.36	33.84	9.67	1.84	21.29	—	0.48

== See also ==
- Opinion polling for the 2020 South Korean legislative election
