= 2024 South Korean legislative election =

- 10 April 2024

All 300 seats in the National Assembly 151 seats needed for a majority
- Turnout: 66.97% (▲0.77pp; Const. votes); 66.99% (▲0.78pp; PR votes)
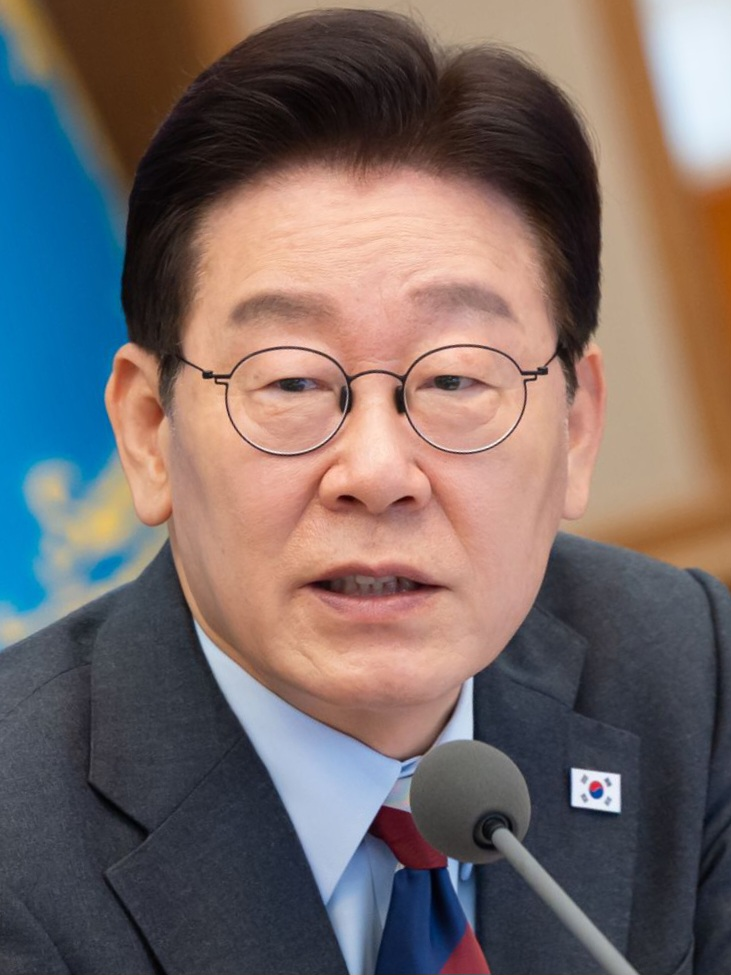

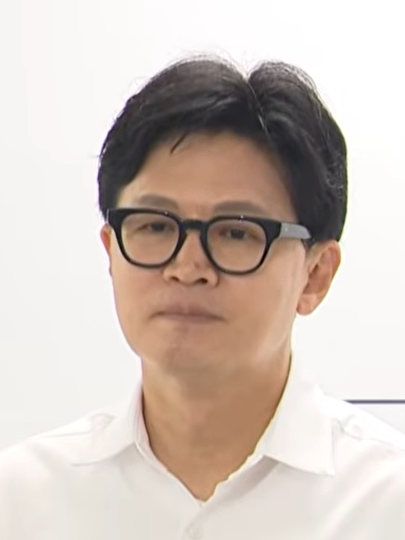

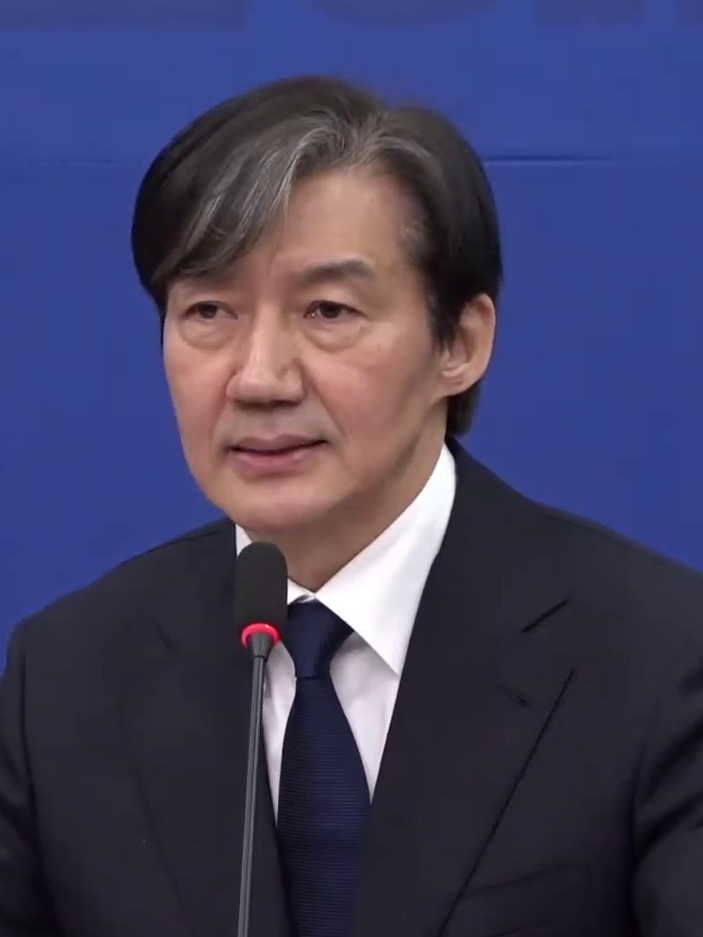

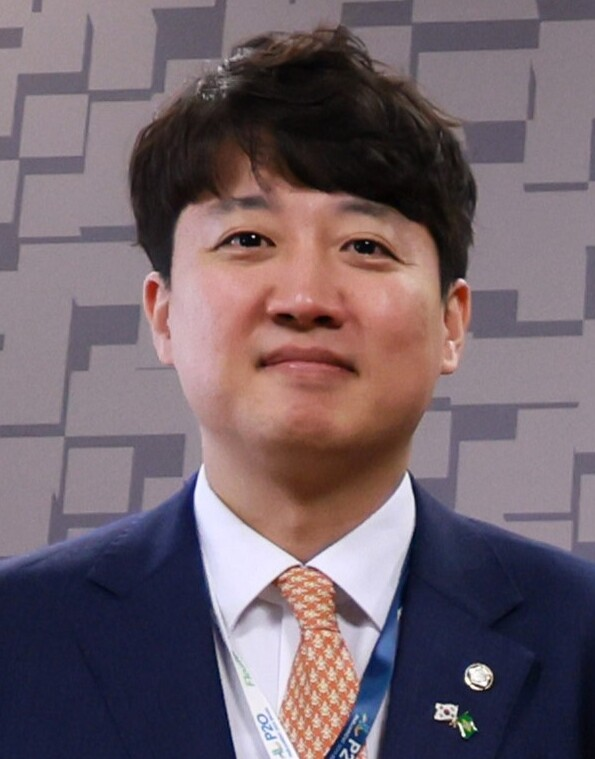
	Majority party	Minority party
Leader	Lee Jae Myung	Han Dong-hoon
Party	Democratic	People Power (Note: with People Future contesting PR seats)
Alliance	Democratic Alliance (Note: For the proportional seats)
Last election	180 seats (Note: Known as Democratic/Platform Party)	103 seats (Note: Known as United Future/Future Korea Party)
Seats won	173 (Note: Including the Basic Income Party in seat totals, which only won seats through the Democratic Alliance proportional list. The Progressive Party won a separate FPTP district, and ran against the DPK in certain provinces.)	108
Seat change	▼7	▲5
Constituency vote	15,075,279	13,179,769
% and swing	51.57% (▲1.66 pp)	45.08% (▲3.62 pp)
Regional vote	7,567,459	10,395,264
% and swing	26.70% (▼6.66pp)	36.67% (▲2.83pp)
	Third party	Fourth party
Leader	Cho Kuk	Lee Jun-seok
Party	Rebuilding Korea	Reform
Last election	Did not exist	Did not exist
Seats won	12	3
Seat change	New	New
Constituency vote	–	195,147
% and swing	–	0.67% (New)
Regional vote	6,874,278	1,025,775
% and swing	24.25% (New)	3.62% (New)
- Results of the election.
Speaker before election
Kim Jin-pyo
Democratic
Elected Speaker
Woo Won-shik
Democratic

Legislative elections were held in South Korea on 10 April 2024. All 300 members of the National Assembly were elected, 254 from first-past-the-post constituencies and 46 from proportional party lists. The two largest parties, the liberal Democratic Party and the conservative People Power Party, once again set up satellite parties to take advantage of the electoral system.

The election served as a "mid-term evaluation" for the administration of President Yoon Suk-yeol as it approached its third year. Additionally, there was significant interest in whether the ruling party could surpass the constraints of the ruling coalition, which did not secure a majority in the previous general election, and gain the necessary momentum to govern effectively during the remainder of its term.

The election saw opposition parties, primarily the Democratic Party, retain their majority in the National Assembly. The new legislators had their first meeting on 30 May.

== Background ==
=== Redistricting ===
On 28 February 2024, the ruling and opposition parties reached a consensus to redraw the electoral districts. Subsequently, the National Assembly's plenary session passed an amendment to the Public Offices Election Act, resulting in the reformation of the electoral districts. In comparison to the 21st National Assembly elections, there was an increase of one constituency, bringing the total to 254, while the seats for proportional representation decreased by one, totaling 46.

== Electoral system ==
The National Assembly's 300 seats were elected by a mixed-member majoritarian electoral system with de facto parallel voting:

- 254 constituency seats are elected via first-past-the-post voting
- 46 seats are elected by proportional representation using largest remainder method.

The minimum voting age is set at 18.

== Campaign ==
The election was held amid several political and socioeconomic issues in South Korea such as corruption, with President Yoon Suk-yeol of the People Power Party facing criticism over the handling of issues involving his wife and a former minister, and party leaders such as the Democratic Party's Lee Jae-myung and Rebuilding Korea Party's Cho Kuk facing trials for bribery and forgery respectively, as well as rising inflation and the ongoing medical crisis. One major talking point was an incident on 18 March when President Yoon visited a grocery store in Seoul to check consumer prices and describing the 875-won ($0.65) price of a green onion he found as reasonable, only for it to emerge that the onions were being sold at a discount and that the true price of onions was three to four times higher. The incident led to opposition candidates bringing out green onions at campaign rallies and the hashtag #greenonions875won becoming a trending topic on social media throughout the election. In response, the National Election Commission banned voters from bringing green onions to polling stations, citing concerns over "election interference". This was in turn, widely ridiculed and led to an increase in demand for green onion-themed merchandise.

On 27 October 2023 the Justice Party and Green Party announced their intention to form an electoral alliance and invited other left-wing parties to participate. This move was heavily criticized by Justice Party deputies Jang Hye-young and Ryu Ho-jeong, as well as former Justice Party Youth Committee Chair Kim Chang-in; all three believe that the Justice Party should form electoral alliances not by ideology, but with any "third zone" party opposed to the Democratic and People Power parties.

On 2 January 2024 Lee Jae-myung was stabbed in an assassination attempt while visiting the construction site of an airport in Gadeokdo, Busan. He was later criticized for using a sexually derogative term to describe People Power Party politician Na Kyung-won in his criticism of her pro-Japanese views.

On 15 January 2024 the Green Party and Justice Party announced a left-wing election coalition called the "Green-Justice Party." On the same day, Basic Income Party leader Yong Hye-in announced a pro-Democrat electoral coalition to counter the People Power Party.

Throughout the campaign the People Power Party argued that President Yoon's government has been unable to push its reform agenda forward since taking office in 2022 due to an uncooperative National Assembly controlled by the opposition, while the Democratic Party described Yoon's administration as "incompetent", accusing it of causing a socioeconomic downturn and mishandling several controversial issues. The Rebuilding Korea Party campaigned for an early end to Yoon's presidency, with Cho Kuk pledging to turn Yoon into "first a lame duck, then a dead duck".

== Political parties ==
Parties	Leader	Ideology	Seats		Status
Parties	Leader	Ideology	Last election	Before election	Status
Democratic Party	Lee Jae-myung	Liberalism	178 / 300 (Note: 163 – Democratic Party; 15 – Platform Party)	156 / 300 (Note: 142 – Democratic Party; 14 – Democratic Alliance)	Opposition
Democratic Party	Lee Jae-myung	Liberalism	3 / 300 (Note: Open Democratic Party)	156 / 300	Opposition
People Power Party	Han Dong-hoon	Conservatism	103 / 300 (Note: 84 – United Future Party; 19 – Future Korea Party)	114 / 300 (Note: 101 – People Power Party; 13 – People Future Party)	Government
People Power Party	Han Dong-hoon	Conservatism	3 / 300 (Note: People Party)	114 / 300	Government
People Power Party	Han Dong-hoon	Conservatism	1 / 300 (Note: Transition Korea)	114 / 300	Government
Green–Justice Party	Kim Jun-woo	Progressivism	6 / 300	6 / 300	Opposition
New Future Party	Lee Nak-yon	Centrist reformism	Did not exist	5 / 300	Opposition
Reform Party	Lee Jun-seok	Conservatism	Did not exist	4 / 300	Opposition
Progressive Party	Yoon Hee-suk	Left-wing nationalism	0 / 300	1 / 300	Opposition
Liberal Unification Party	Chang Kyung-dong	Religious conservatism	0 / 300	1 / 300	Government
Rebuilding Korea Party	Cho Kuk	Liberalism	Did not exist	1 / 300	Opposition

== Candidates ==
Electoral symbol		Parties	Candidates	
Constituency	Proportional	Parties	Constituency (254)	Proportional (46)
1	—N/a	Democratic Party	245 / 254	—N/a
2	—N/a	People Power Party	254 / 254	—N/a
—N/a	3	Democratic Alliance of Korea	—N/a	30 / 46
—N/a	4	People Future Party	—N/a	35 / 46
5		Green–Justice Party	17 / 254	14 / 46
6		New Future Party	28 / 254	11 / 46
7		Reform Party	43 / 254	10 / 46
7 or 8	8	Liberal Unification Party	10 / 254	18 / 46
7 or 8	—N/a	Progressive Party	21 / 254	—N/a
—N/a	9	Rebuilding Korea Party	—N/a	25 / 46

=== Lawmakers not standing for re-election ===
By 14 February 2024, a total of 16 current members of the National Assembly had announced their intention not to stand for re-election.

Number of lawmakers' retirements by party affiliation
Party	Lawmakers retiring	
Party	Elected (Note: Party affiliation of retiring MPs at the time of the 2020 legislative election.)	Current
Democratic	13	10
People Power	4	2
Independent	0	3
New Future	0	1
Total	16	

Members of the National Assembly not standing for re-election
MP	Seat	First elected	Party	Date Announced
Woo Sang-ho	Seodaemun A	2004	Democratic	13 December 2020
Oh Yeong-hwan	Gyeonggi Uijeongbu A	2020	New Future	10 April 2023
Ha Young-je	Sacheon–Namhae–Hadong	2020	Independent	24 May 2023
Kim Nam-kuk	Ansan Danwon B	2020	Independent	22 August 2023
Park Byeong-seug	Seo A	2000	Democratic	6 November 2023
Kang Min-jung	Proportional	2020	Democratic	15 November 2023
Chang Je-won	Sasang	2008	People Power Party	12 December 2023
Lee Tahney	Yongin D	2020	Democratic	13 December 2023
Hong Sung-kook	Sejong A	2020	Democratic	13 December 2023
Kim Jin-pyo	Suwon E	2004	Independent (Incumbent Speaker)	4 January 2024
Kim Woong	Songpa A	2020	People Power Party	8 January 2024
Kim Min-ki	Yongin B	2012	Democratic	19 January 2024
Lim Jong-seong	Gwangju B	2016	Democratic	19 January 2024
Kim Hong-gul	Proportional	2020	Democratic	22 January 2024
Choi Jong-yoon	Hanam	2020	Democratic	22 January 2024
In Jae-keun	Dobong A	2012	Democratic	14 February 2024
Lee Won-wook	Hwaseong B	2012	Democratic	

== Opinion polls ==
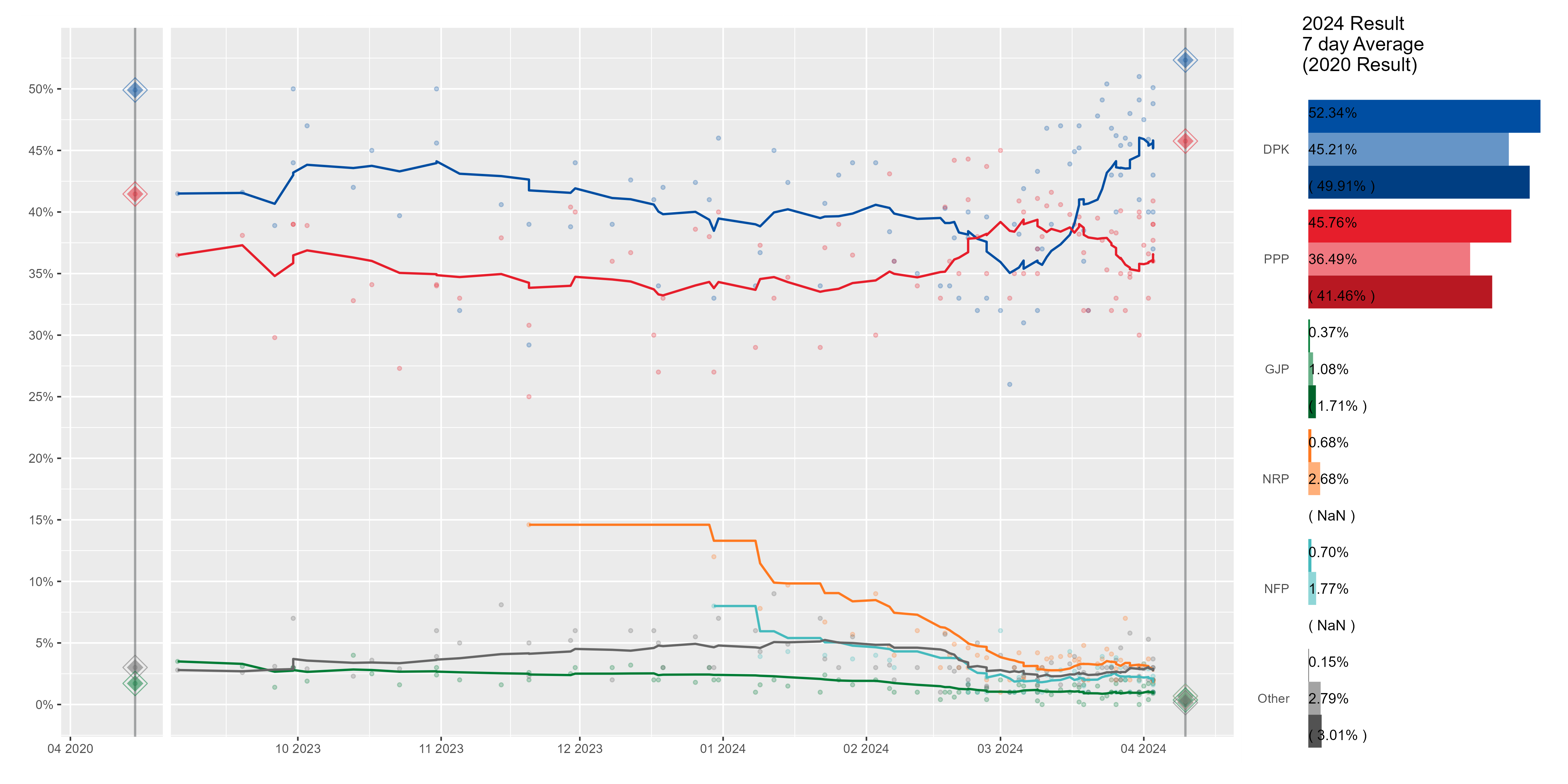
7 day moving average curve of the polling for the constituency vote with a 7-day average bar chart.

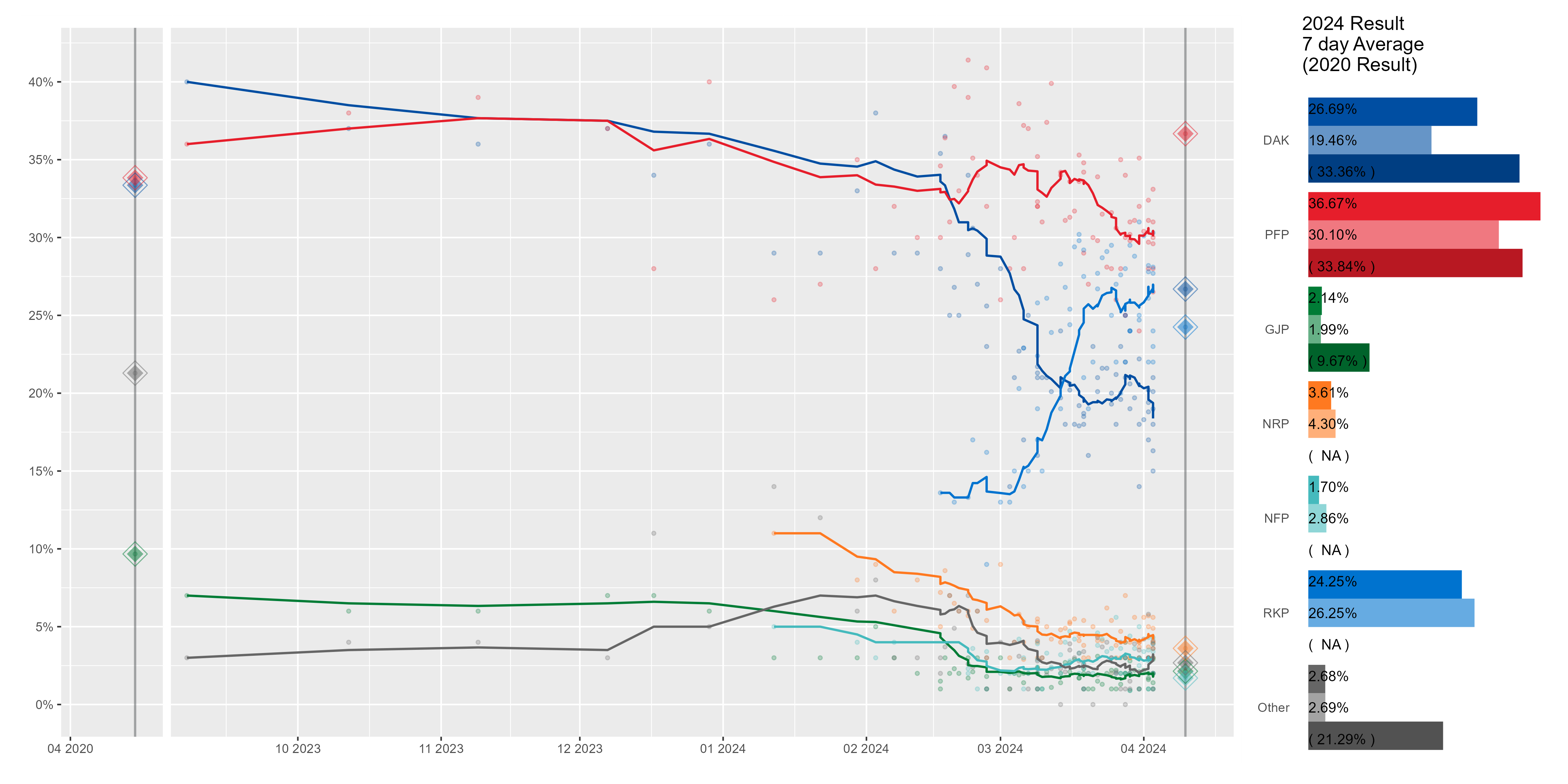
7 day moving average curve of the polling for the proportional vote with a 7-day average bar chart.

== Conduct ==
Early voting opened on 5 April and lasted until 7 April. Among those who cast their votes early were People Power Party leader Han Dong-hoon, who voted in Seoul, and Democratic Party leader Lee Jae-myung, who voted in Daejeon. At least 13.8 million voters participated in early voting, equivalent to about 31% of the electorate.

On election day, voting in 14,259 polling stations opened at 06:00 and closed at 18:00. Overall turnout was estimated at 67%, an increase of 0.8% from 2020, and the highest recorded for a legislative election in South Korea since 1992.

== Results ==
Exit polls indicated that the Democratic Party and its partner, the Democratic Alliance of Korea, would win between 168 and 197 seats in the National Assembly, while the People Power Party and its partner, the People Future Party, were expected to win between 85 and 111 seats. The Rebuilding Korea Party, which only contested proportional representation seats, was projected to win 15 seats. Democratic Party leader Lee Jae-myung was projected to keep his seat in Gyeyang B of Incheon against People Power Party candidate and former land minister Won Hee-ryong, winning 56.1% and 42.8% of the vote respectively. The Justice Party failed to win seats for the first time since its foundation in 2012.

Among the elected candidates in proportional representation seats was Park Choong-kwon (representing the People Future Party), a North Korean defector who previously worked in the North Korean nuclear weapons programme before fleeing to the South in 2009.

The election also saw the highest number of invalid votes cast for proportional representation seats since its introduction in 2004, with the National Electoral Commission tallying 1,309,931 such ballots, equivalent to 4.4% of votes cast.

Party or alliance		Proportional			Constituency			Total seats
Party or alliance		Votes	%	Seats	Votes	%	Seats	Total seats
People Power Party / People Future Party		10,395,264	36.67	18	13,179,769	45.08	90	108
Democratic Alliance	Democratic Party	7,567,459	26.70	8	14,758,083	50.48	161	169
Democratic Alliance	Progressive Party	7,567,459	26.70	2	302,925	1.04	1	3
Democratic Alliance	New Progressive Alliance (Note: Alliance of the Basic Income Party, the Social Democratic Party and the Open Democratic Party)	7,567,459	26.70	2	14,271	0.05	0	2
Democratic Alliance	Independents	7,567,459	26.70	2				2
Democratic Alliance	Total	7,567,459	26.70	14	15,075,279	51.57	162	176
Rebuilding Korea Party		6,874,278	24.25	12				12
Reform Party		1,025,775	3.62	2	195,147	0.67	1	3
Liberal Unification Party		642,433	2.27	0	18,700	0.06	0	0
Green–Justice Party		609,313	2.15	0	107,029	0.37	0	0
New Future Party		483,827	1.71	0	200,502	0.69	1	1
Pine Tree Party		124,369	0.44	0	18,939	0.06	0	0
Grand National Party		72,925	0.26	0				0
National Revolutionary Party		67,420	0.24	0				0
Saenuri Party		57,210	0.20	0				0
Liberal Democratic Party		39,977	0.14	0	1,245	0.00	0	0
Christian Party		36,117	0.13	0	218	0.00	0	0
Grand National Unity Party		30,323	0.11	0				0
Our Republican Party		29,895	0.11	0	12,814	0.04	0	0
Great Korea Party		29,481	0.10	0				0
Women's Party		28,942	0.10	0				0
Hashtag People's Policy Party		26,906	0.09	0				0
Labor Party		25,937	0.09	0	7,465	0.03	0	0
Financial Reform Party		20,548	0.07	0				0
Senior Welfare Party		15,178	0.05	0				0
Republican Party		14,912	0.05	0				0
Hongik Party		13,326	0.05	0				0
Korea's Farmer and Fisherman's Party		13,035	0.05	0	2,804	0.01	0	0
Korea People's Party		11,947	0.04	0	85	0.00	0	0
Mirae Party		11,505	0.04	0				0
New National Participation Party		10,242	0.04	0				0
To Tomorrow, to the Future		9,417	0.03	0	1,333	0.00	0	0
Republic of Korea Party		8,527	0.03	0				0
Unification Korea Party		8,518	0.03	0				0
Korea Party		7,820	0.03	0				0
Popular Democratic Party		7,663	0.03	0				0
Gihuminsaeng Party		6,615	0.02	0	778	0.00	0	0
Party for the Abolition of Special Privileges		4,707	0.02	0	54	0.00	0	0
Korean Wave Union Party		3,894	0.01	0				0
Korea Business Party		3,783	0.01	0				0
K-Political Innovation Union Party		3,451	0.01	0				0
New Korean Peninsula Party		1,580	0.01	0				0
Korean National Party					1,917	0.01	0	0
People's Democracy Party					290	0.00	0	0
Independents					409,761	1.40	0	0
Total		28,344,519	100.00	46	29,234,129	100.00	254	300
Valid votes		28,344,519	95.58		29,234,129	98.63		
Invalid/blank votes		1,309,931	4.42		406,790	1.37		
Total votes		29,654,450	100.00		29,640,919	100.00		
Registered voters/turnout		44,280,011	66.97		44,245,552	66.99		
Source: KBS, Daum, NEC

=== By city/province ===
Seat tally and results by city/province

Constituency results by city/province
Region	DPK		PPP		Prog.		NFP		NRP		GJP		Ind.		Total seats
Region	Seats	%	Seats	%	Seats	%	Seats	%	Seats	%	Seats	%	Seats	%	Total seats
Seoul	37	52.2	11	46.3	0	0.1	0	0.4	0	0.5	0	0.4	0	0.1	48
Busan	1	42.0	17	53.9	0	3.0	–		0	0.2	0	0.1	0	0.7	18
Daegu	0	19.3	12	70.2	0	2.6	–		0	1.0	0	0.2	0	4.1	12
Incheon	12	53.5	2	44.9	–		0	0.7	0	0.4	0	0.1	0	0.3	14
Gwangju	8	76.5	0	7.9	0	6.3	0	3.1	0	0.5	0	1.7	0	2.3	8
Daejeon	7	54.2	0	42.8	–		0	1.5	0	0.9	–		0	0.6	7
Ulsan	1	36.3	4	51.4	1	10.3	0	0.5	–		–		0	0.4	6
Sejong	1	24.4	0	40.7	–		1	32.2	0	2.0	–		0	0.6	2
Gyeonggi	53	54.7	6	42.8	–		0	0.5	1	1.4	0	0.4	0	0.2	60
Gangwon	2	45.5	6	53.1	–		0	0.2	0	0.7	–		0	0.6	8
North Chungcheong	5	50.2	3	47.9	–		0	0.5	0	0.6	0	0.2	0	0.6	8
South Chungcheong	8	51.6	3	47.1	–		0	0.1	0	0.4	0	0.1	0	0.6	11
North Jeolla	10	81.6	0	12.9	0	1.9	0	1.2	–		0	0.8	0	0.9	10
South Jeolla	10	73.2	0	9.8	0	6.0	0	0.2	0	0.1	0	0.3	0	9.9	10
North Gyeongsang	0	21.6	13	67.2	0	0.8	0	0.2	–		0	0.6	0	9.2	13
South Gyeongsang	3	42.4	13	55.4	–		–		0	0.2	0	0.6	0	1.4	16
Jeju	3	60.9	0	37.9	–		–		–		0	1.2	–		3
Total	161	50.5	90	45.1	1	1.0	1	0.7	1	0.7	0	0.4	0	1.4	254

Party list vote results by city/province
Region	PPP	DPK	RKP	NRP	LUP	GJP	NFP	Other
Seoul	36.9	26.2	22.9	4.4	2.4	2.7	2.1	2.4
Busan	45.9	20.8	22.5	3.2	2.3	1.6	1.3	2.5
Daegu	60.2	13.7	11.8	4.7	3.0	1.9	1.2	3.5
Incheon	34.9	30.0	22.7	3.3	2.5	2.3	1.8	2.6
Gwangju	5.8	36.3	47.7	2.3	0.7	1.5	2.9	2.9
Daejeon	35.5	27.7	24.0	3.8	2.7	1.9	2.1	2.3
Ulsan	41.8	24.2	22.2	3.2	1.8	2.0	1.4	3.4
Sejong	29.9	25.1	30.9	4.7	1.8	2.1	3.4	2.2
Gyeonggi	33.9	29.1	24.3	4.1	2.4	2.2	1.7	2.3
Gangwon	43.6	24.9	20.1	3.1	2.3	2.0	1.3	2.9
North Chungcheong	39.1	27.5	21.9	3.1	2.2	2.1	1.4	2.8
South Chungcheong	39.0	28.3	21.1	2.9	2.5	2.0	1.4	2.8
North Jeolla	8.5	37.6	45.5	2.0	1.1	1.5	1.6	2.3
South Jeolla	6.6	39.9	44.0	2.0	0.9	1.4	2.3	3.0
North Gyeongsang	60.2	14.7	11.7	3.2	3.1	1.9	1.1	4.0
South Gyeongsang	46.2	21.5	20.5	3.0	2.0	2.2	1.2	3.3
Jeju	31.4	28.3	27.9	3.0	1.3	4.1	1.5	2.5
Overall total	36.7	26.7	24.3	3.6	2.3	2.1	1.7	2.7
Seat allocation	18	14	12	2	0	0	0	0

=== Results by constituency ===
City/Province	Constituency		Turnout	Winner				Runner-up				Margin
City/Province	No.	Name	%	Candidate	Party	Votes	%	Candidate	Party	Votes	%	Margin
Seoul	1	Jongno	70.44	Kwak Sang-eon	DPK	44,713	50.92	Choi Jae-hyung	PPP	38,752	44.13	5,961
Seoul	2	Jung–Seongdong A	69.63	Jeon Hyun-hee	DPK	65,204	52.61	Yoon Hee-sook	PPP	58,726	47.38	6,478
Seoul	3	Jung–Seongdong B	69.38	Park Sung-joon	DPK	61,728	50.81	Lee Hye-hoon	PPP	58,961	48.53	2,767
Seoul	4	Yongsan	68.91	Kwon Young-se	PPP	66,583	51.77	Kang Tae-woong	DPK	60,473	47.02	6,110
Seoul	5	Gwangjin A	69.46	Lee Jung-heon	DPK	54,105	52.53	Kim Byung-min	PPP	48,881	47.46	5,224
Seoul	6	Gwangjin B	69.30	Ko Min-jung	DPK	53,362	51.47	Oh Shin-hwan	PPP	49,347	47.60	4,015
Seoul	7	Dongdaemun A	68.19	Ahn Gyu-back	DPK	53,978	52.89	Kim Young-woo	PPP	45,377	44.46	8,601
Seoul	8	Dongdaemun B	70.02	Jang Kyung-tae	DPK	58,286	54.62	Kim Kyung-jin	PPP	48,408	45.37	9,878
Seoul	9	Jungnang A	63.83	Seo Young-kyo	DPK	60,881	61.92	Kim Sam-hwa	PPP	37,429	38.07	23,452
Seoul	10	Jungnang B	68.65	Park Hong-keun	DPK	73,600	57.72	Lee Seung-hwan	PPP	53,898	42.27	19,702
Seoul	11	Seongbuk A	69.41	Kim Young-bae	DPK	74,707	55.68	Lee Jong-cheol	PPP	52,511	39.14	22,196
Seoul	12	Seongbuk B	68.98	Kim Nam-geun	DPK	68,872	56.82	Lee Sang-gyu	PPP	52,328	43.17	16,544
Seoul	13	Gangbuk A	64.03	Chun Joon-ho	DPK	47,701	57.23	Jeon Sang-beom	PPP	35,639	42.76	12,062
Seoul	14	Gangbuk B	66.71	Han Min-su	DPK	44,623	52.94	Park Jin-woong	PPP	34,989	41.51	9,634
Seoul	15	Dobong A	69.75	Kim Jae-seop	PPP	46,374	49.05	Ahn Gwi-ryeong	DPK	45,276	47.89	1,098
Seoul	16	Dobong B	69.82	Oh Gi-hyung	DPK	50,384	52.83	Kim Seon-dong	PPP	44,969	47.16	5,415
Seoul	17	Nowon A	70.69	Woo Won-shik	DPK	91,986	58.99	Hyun Kyung-byung	PPP	63,924	41.00	28,062
Seoul	18	Nowon B	70.19	Kim Sung-hwan	DPK	85,721	58.51	Kim Jun-ho	PPP	57,515	39.26	28,206
Seoul	19	Eunpyeong A	68.09	Park Joo-min	DPK	89,379	60.78	Hong In-jeong	PPP	57,661	39.21	31,718
Seoul	20	Eunpyeong B	67.77	Kim Woo-young	DPK	74,211	56.95	Jang Seong-ho	PPP	51,612	39.60	22,599
Seoul	21	Seodaemun A	69.17	Kim Dong-a	DPK	44,890	50.75	Lee Yong-ho	PPP	38,466	43.49	6,424
Seoul	22	Seodaemun B	71.11	Kim Yeong-ho	DPK	57,198	57.62	Park Jin	PPP	42,059	42.37	15,139
Seoul	23	Mapo A	72.22	Cho Jung-hun	PPP	48,342	48.30	Lee Ji-eun	DPK	47,743	47.70	599
Seoul	24	Mapo B	68.53	Jung Chung-rae	DPK	64,715	52.44	Ham Un-kyung	PPP	47,848	38.77	16,867
Seoul	25	Yangcheon A	73.98	Hwang Hee	DPK	71,285	49.78	Koo Ja-ryong	PPP	68,959	48.16	2,326
Seoul	26	Yangcheon B	68.27	Lee Yong-seon	DPK	67,962	57.47	Oh Kyung-hoon	PPP	50,293	42.52	17,669
Seoul	27	Gangseo A	66.47	Kang Sun-woo	DPK	64,651	58.55	Gu Sang-chan	PPP	42,703	38.67	21,948
Seoul	28	Gangseo B	68.81	Jin Seong-jun	DPK	63,601	54.84	Park Min-sik	PPP	52,354	45.15	11,247
Seoul	29	Gangseo C	67.32	Han Jeoung-ae	DPK	62,297	59.13	Kim Il-ho	PPP	43,046	40.86	19,251
Seoul	30	Guro A	71.05	Lee In-young	DPK	80,182	55.74	Ho Jun-seok	PPP	63,664	44.25	16,518
Seoul	31	Guro B	69.02	Youn Kun-young	DPK	57,788	59.86	Tae Young-ho	PPP	38,741	40.13	19,047
Seoul	32	Geumcheon	65.28	Choi Ki-sang	DPK	78,587	59.03	Kang Seong-man	PPP	54,525	40.96	24,062
Seoul	33	Yeongdeungpo A	70.20	Chae Hyeon-il	DPK	73,163	54.53	Kim Young-joo	PPP	55,913	41.67	17,250
Seoul	34	Yeongdeungpo B	70.77	Kim Min-seok	DPK	49,651	50.18	Park Yong-chan	PPP	48,516	49.03	1,135
Seoul	35	Dongjak A	70.54	Kim Byung-kee	DPK	63,372	50.49	Jang Jin-young	PPP	56,498	45.01	6,874
Seoul	36	Dongjak B	74.18	Na Kyung-won	PPP	62,720	54.01	Lee Su-jin	DPK	53,395	45.98	9,325
Seoul	37	Gwanak A	66.31	Park Min-gyu	DPK	89,778	57.08	Yoo Ki-hong	PPP	67,503	42.91	22,275
Seoul	38	Gwanak B	63.42	Jeong Tae-ho	DPK	73,771	57.97	Lee Seong-sim	PPP	49,418	38.83	24,353
Seoul	39	Seocho A	71.67	Cho Eun-hee	PPP	74,813	68.44	Kim Hanna	DPK	34,488	31.55	40,325
Seoul	40	Seocho B	72.10	Shin Dong-uk	PPP	77,638	57.49	Hong Ihk-pyo	DPK	57,404	42.50	20,234
Seoul	41	Gangnam A	61.37	Seo Myeong-ok	PPP	60,549	64.18	Kim Tae-hyung	DPK	33,781	35.81	26,768
Seoul	42	Gangnam B	73.68	Pak Soo-min	PPP	71,633	58.57	Kang Cheong-hee	DPK	50,663	41.42	20,970
Seoul	43	Gangnam C	70.63	Koh Dong-jin	PPP	66,597	66.28	Park Kyung-mi	DPK	32,908	32.75	33,689
Seoul	44	Songpa A	72.15	Park Jeong-hun	PPP	56,521	52.24	Cho Jae-hee	DPK	48,831	45.13	7,690
Seoul	45	Songpa B	71.47	Bae Hyun-jin	PPP	77,531	57.20	Song Ki-ho	DPK	57,990	42.79	19,541
Seoul	46	Songpa C	72.22	Nam In-soon	DPK	80,358	51.04	Kim Geun-sik	PPP	77,072	48.95	3,286
Seoul	47	Gangdong A	74.53	Jin Sun-mee	DPK	73,791	50.12	Jeon Ju-hye	PPP	70,489	47.88	3,302
Seoul	48	Gangdong B	67.86	Lee Hae-sik	DPK	71,376	53.55	Lee Jae-young	PPP	59,551	44.68	11,825
Busan	1	Jung–Yeongdo	64.35	Jo Seung-hwan	PPP	46,254	54.82	Park Young-mi	DPK	36,739	43.54	9,515
Busan	2	Seo–Dong	65.83	Kwak Kyu-taek	PPP	64,884	57.95	Choi Hyung-wook	DPK	47,066	42.04	17,818
Busan	3	Busanjin A	67.09	Jeong Seong-guk	PPP	56,153	52.78	Seo Eun-sook	DPK	50,220	47.21	5,933
Busan	4	Busanjin B	63.01	Lee Heon-seung	PPP	53,897	53.71	Lee Hyun	DPK	44,286	44.13	9,611
Busan	5	Dongnae	69.00	Seo Ji-young	PPP	85,313	54.26	Park Seong-hyeon	DPK	67,941	43.21	17,372
Busan	6	Nam	70.23	Park Soo-young	PPP	84,563	54.40	Park Jae-ho	DPK	70,868	45.59	13,695
Busan	7	Buk A	68.93	Jeon Jae-soo	DPK	43,548	52.31	Seo Byeong-su	PPP	38,850	46.67	4,698
Busan	8	Buk B	73.42	Park Sung-hoon	PPP	44,886	52.56	Jeong Myeong-hee	DPK	40,499	47.43	4,387
Busan	9	Haeundae A	69.13	Joo Jin-woo	PPP	68,267	53.70	Hong Soon-heon	DPK	56,717	44.61	11,550
Busan	10	Haeundae B	66.73	Kim Mi-ae	PPP	54,340	58.33	Yoon Jun-ho	DPK	38,811	41.66	15,529
Busan	11	Saha A	67.11	Lee Seong-kwon	PPP	43,909	50.39	Choi In-ho	DPK	43,216	49.60	693
Busan	12	Saha B	65.16	Cho Kyoung-tae	PPP	46,855	55.62	Lee Jae-sung	DPK	35,735	42.42	11,120
Busan	13	Geumjeong	68.35	Paik Jong-hun	PPP	73,237	56.62	Park In-young	DPK	56,100	43.37	17,137
Busan	14	Gangseo	68.40	Kim Do-eup	PPP	42,108	55.58	Byun Seong-wan	DPK	33,645	44.41	8,463
Busan	15	Yeonje	69.41	Kim Hee-jeong	PPP	68,402	54.41	Noh Jeong-hyeon	PP	57,293	45.58	11,109
Busan	16	Suyeong	66.19	Jeong Yeon-wook	PPP	51,092	50.33	Yoo Dong-cheol	DPK	41,088	40.47	10,004
Busan	17	Sasang	66.71	Kim Dae-sik	PPP	62,975	52.63	Bae Jae-jeong	DPK	56,659	47.36	6,316
Busan	18	Gijang	64.97	Jeong Dong-man	PPP	49,248	52.33	Choi Taek-yong	DPK	44,852	47.66	4,396
Daegu	1	Jung–Nam	62.12	Kim Ki-woong	PPP	72,380	57.91	Heo So	DPK	32,783	26.23	39,597
Daegu	2	Dong–Gunwi A	64.17	Choi Eun-seok	PPP	68,563	74.48	Shin Hyo-cheol	DPK	23,484	25.51	45,079
Daegu	3	Dong–Gunwi B	64.17	Kang Dae-sik	PPP	82,855	76.13	Hwang Sun-kyu	PP	21,190	19.47	61,665
Daegu	4	Seo	61.64	Kim Sang-hoon	PPP	64,167	72.02	Seo Jung-hyun	Ind	24,929	27.97	39,238
Daegu	5	Buk A	64.05	Woo Jae-jun	PPP	68,742	71.37	Park Chung-hee	DPK	26,266	27.27	42,476
Daegu	6	Buk B	62.65	Kim Seung-su	PPP	87,356	67.86	Shin Dong-hwan	DPK	32,797	25.47	54,559
Daegu	7	Suseong A	68.61	Joo Ho-young	PPP	89,440	65.63	Kang Min-gu	DPK	41,332	30.33	48,108
Daegu	8	Suseong B	65.11	Lee In-seon	PPP	66,787	72.84	Oh Jun-ho	NPA	14,271	15.56	52,516
Daegu	9	Dalseo A	63.48	Yoo Young-ha	PPP	60,070	71.39	Kwon Taek-heung	DPK	24,068	28.60	36,002
Daegu	10	Dalseo B	66.59	Yoon Jae-ok	PPP	93,003	72.47	Kim Seong-tae	DPK	35,313	27.52	57,690
Daegu	11	Dalseo C	61.28	Kwon Young-jin	PPP	49,816	67.08	Cho Won-jin	ORP	12,492	16.82	37,324
Daegu	12	Dalseong	62.96	Choo Kyung-ho	PPP	100,544	75.31	Park Hyung-ryong	DPK	32,955	24.68	67,589
Incheon	1	Jung–Ganghwa–Ongjin	65.92	Bae Jun-young	PPP	78,408	54.99	Cho Taek-sang	DPK	62,582	43.89	15,826
Incheon	2	Dong–Michuhol A	62.33	Heo Jong-sik	DPK	74,618	53.73	Shim Jae-don	PPP	64,246	46.26	10,372
Incheon	3	Dong–Michuhol B	63.54	Yoon Sang-hyun	PPP	58,730	50.44	Nam Young-hee	DPK	57,705	49.55	1,025
Incheon	4	Yeonsu A	67.96	Park Chan-dae	DPK	58,663	52.44	Jeong Seung-yeon	PPP	51,546	46.08	7,117
Incheon	5	Yeonsu B	70.76	Jeong Il-young	DPK	56,667	51.50	Kim Ki-heung	PPP	53,354	48.49	3,313
Incheon	6	Namdong A	62.90	Maeng Seong-gyu	DPK	73,764	56.96	Son Beom-gyu	PPP	52,139	40.26	21,625
Incheon	7	Namdong B	65.78	Lee Hoon-gi	DPK	76,443	54.48	Shin Jae-kyung	PPP	63,861	45.51	12,582
Incheon	8	Bupyeong A	61.62	No Jong-myeon	DPK	76,797	55.19	Yoo Je-hong	PPP	62,340	44.80	14,457
Incheon	9	Bupyeong B	67.68	Park Seon-won	DPK	70,896	51.36	Lee Hyun-woong	PPP	53,487	38.75	17,409
Incheon	10	Gyeyang A	65.96	Yoo Dong-soo	DPK	45,823	58.29	Choi Won-sik	PPP	32,780	41.70	13,043
Incheon	11	Gyeyang B	71.34	Lee Jae-myung	DPK	48,365	54.12	Won Hee-ryong	PPP	40,616	45.45	7,749
Incheon	12	Seo A	64.11	Kim Kyo-heung	DPK	63,564	57.59	Park Sang-su	PPP	44,565	40.37	18,999
Incheon	13	Seo B	64.56	Lee Yong-woo	DPK	60,423	56.53	Park Jong-jin	PPP	46,448	43.46	13,975
Incheon	14	Seo C	63.61	Mo Gyeong-jong	DPK	65,033	57.52	Lee Haeng-sook	PPP	44,720	39.55	20,313
Gwangju	1	Dong–Nam A	69.64	Jeong Jin-wook	DPK	82,883	88.69	Kang Hyun-gu	PPP	10,563	11.30	72,320
Gwangju	2	Dong–Nam B	70.23	Ahn Do-geol	DPK	64,558	70.16	Kim Seong-hwan	Ind	14,865	16.15	49,693
Gwangju	3	Seo A	66.80	Jo In-cheol	DPK	56,267	68.42	Song Young-gil	PTH	14,292	17.38	41,975
Gwangju	4	Seo B	69.38	Yang Bu-nam	DPK	58,037	71.39	Kang Eun-mi	GJ	11,922	14.66	46,115
Gwangju	5	Buk A	66.53	Jeong Jun-ho	DPK	86,713	83.45	Kim Jeong-myeong	PPP	8,856	8.52	77,857
Gwangju	6	Buk B	69.23	Jeon Jin-sook	DPK	99,993	72.11	Yoon Min-ho	PP	22,664	16.34	77,329
Gwangju	7	Gwangsan A	66.60	Park Kyun-taek	DPK	74,102	81.70	Kim Jung-hyun	PPP	6,318	6.96	67,784
Gwangju	8	Gwangsan B	67.27	Min Hyung-bae	DPK	94,733	76.09	Lee Nak-yeon	NFP	17,237	13.84	77,496
Daejeon	1	Dong	64.41	Jang Cheol-min	DPK	64,597	53.32	Yoon Chang-hyun	PPP	54,527	45.01	10,070
Daejeon	2	Jung	66.44	Park Yong-gap	DPK	66,509	52.08	Lee Eun-kwon	PPP	61,172	47.91	5,337
Daejeon	3	Seo A	64.47	Jang Jong-tae	DPK	71,576	52.83	Cho Soo-yeon	PPP	56,136	41.43	15,440
Daejeon	4	Seo B	66.01	Park Beom-gye	DPK	65,340	54.58	Yang Hong-gyu	PPP	51,320	42.87	14,020
Daejeon	5	Yuseong A	67.02	Jo Seung-rae	DPK	60,038	56.77	Yoon So-sik	PPP	43,189	40.84	16,849
Daejeon	6	Yuseong B	71.57	Hwang Jeong-ah	DPK	61,387	59.76	Lee Sang-min	PPP	38,209	37.19	23,178
Daejeon	7	Daedeok	65.45	Park Jung-hyun	DPK	49,273	50.92	Park Kyung-ho	PPP	41,655	43.05	7,618
Ulsan	1	Jung	67.71	Park Seong-min	PPP	67,601	56.44	Oh Sang-taek	DPK	52,158	43.55	15,443
Ulsan	2	Nam A	67.98	Kim Sang-wook	PPP	50,066	53.86	Jeon Eun-su	DPK	39,687	42.69	10,379
Ulsan	3	Nam B	64.77	Kim Ki-hyun	PPP	44,502	56.22	Park Sung-jin	DPK	34,644	43.77	9,858
Ulsan	4	Dong	66.65	Kim Tae-seon	DPK	38,474	45.88	Kwon Myung-ho	PPP	37,906	45.20	568
Ulsan	5	Buk	66.27	Yoon Jong-o	PP	63,188	55.12	Park Dae-dong	PPP	49,155	42.88	14,033
Ulsan	6	Ulju	67.35	Seo Beom-su	PPP	67,044	53.48	Lee Seon-ho	DPK	58,307	46.51	8,737
Sejong	1	Sejong A	71.10	Kim Jong-min	NFP	65,599	56.93	Ryu Je-hwa	PPP	49,622	43.06	15,977
Sejong	2	Sejong B	68.87	Kang Jun-hyun	DPK	49,621	56.19	Lee Jun-bae	PPP	33,148	37.54	16,473
Gyeonggi	1	Suwon A	68.62	Kim Seung-won	DPK	75,562	55.54	Kim Hyun-joon	PPP	57,366	42.16	18,196
Gyeonggi	2	Suwon B	66.54	Baek Hye-ryun	DPK	86,677	61.73	Hong Yun-o	PPP	53,720	38.26	32,957
Gyeonggi	3	Suwon C	64.65	Kim Young-jin	DPK	64,505	55.41	Bang Moon-gyu	PPP	51,897	44.58	12,608
Gyeonggi	4	Suwon D	70.66	Kim Jun-hyuck	DPK	69,881	50.86	Lee Soo-jung	PPP	67,504	49.13	2,377
Gyeonggi	5	Suwon E	66.29	Yeom Tae-yeong	DPK	87,665	59.00	Park Jae-soon	PPP	60,905	40.99	26,760
Gyeonggi	6	Sujeong, Seongnam	66.83	Kim Tae-nyeon	DPK	80,835	58.41	Jang Young-ha	PPP	57,539	41.58	23,296
Gyeonggi	7	Jungwon, Seongnam	66.63	Lee Soo-jin	DPK	73,661	60.11	Yoon Yong-geun	PPP	48,868	39.88	24,793
Gyeonggi	8	Bundang A, Seongnam	77.12	Ahn Cheol-soo	PPP	87,315	53.27	Lee Kwang-jae	DPK	76,578	46.72	10,737
Gyeonggi	9	Bundang B, Seongnam	75.03	Kim Eun-hye	PPP	69,259	51.13	Kim Byung-wook	DPK	66,196	48.86	3,063
Gyeonggi	10	Uijeongbu A	61.81	Park Jee-hye	DPK	59,660	54.89	Jeon Hee-kyung	PPP	47,221	43.44	12,439
Gyeonggi	11	Uijeongbu B	65.47	Lee Jae-kang	DPK	79,697	55.27	Lee Hyung-seop	PPP	64,478	44.72	15,219
Gyeonggi	12	Manan, Anyang	68.98	Kang Deuk-ku	DPK	78,924	56.85	Choi Don-ik	PPP	59,884	43.14	19,040
Gyeonggi	13	Dongan A, Anyang	72.42	Min Byeong-deok	DPK	56,891	57.33	Im Jae-hoon	PPP	42,335	42.66	14,556
Gyeonggi	14	Dongan B, Anyang	75.69	Lee Jae-jung	DPK	52,248	53.86	Shim Jae-cheol	PPP	44,751	46.13	7,497
Gyeonggi	15	Bucheon A	61.24	Seo Young-seok	DPK	85,815	61.13	Kim Bok-deok	PPP	54,556	38.86	31,259
Gyeonggi	16	Bucheon B	69.67	Kim Gi-pyo	DPK	82,475	55.90	Park Seong-jung	PPP	55,975	37.93	26,500
Gyeonggi	17	Bucheon C	67.56	Lee Geon-tae	DPK	84,886	54.44	Ha Jong-dae	PPP	59,312	38.04	25,574
Gyeonggi	18	Gwangmyeong A	72.38	Im O-kyeong	DPK	47,716	58.73	Kim Ki-nam	PPP	33,525	41.26	14,191
Gyeonggi	19	Gwangmyeong B	71.48	Kim Nam-hee	DPK	52,455	59.56	Jeon Dong-seok	PPP	35,602	40.43	16,853
Gyeonggi	20	Pyeongtaek A	58.75	Hong Gi-won	DPK	55,550	57.41	Han Moo-kyung	PPP	41,202	42.58	14,348
Gyeonggi	21	Pyeongtaek B	58.62	Lee Byeong-jin	DPK	49,998	54.23	Yoo Ui-dong	PPP	42,197	45.76	7,801
Gyeonggi	22	Pyeongtaek C	62.20	Kim Hyun-jung	DPK	55,794	52.76	Yoo Ui-dong	PPP	45,977	43.48	9,817
Gyeonggi	23	Dongducheon–Yangju–Yeoncheon A	63.10	Jeong Seong-ho	DPK	82,186	60.26	Ahn Ki-young	PPP	54,183	39.73	28,003
Gyeonggi	24	Dongducheon–Yangju–Yeoncheon B	63.87	Kim Seong-won	PPP	42,393	53.70	Nam Byeong-geun	DPK	36,540	46.29	5,853
Gyeonggi	25	Ansan A	61.55	Yang Moon-seok	DPK	57,050	55.62	Jang Seong-min	PPP	45,517	44.37	11,533
Gyeonggi	26	Ansan B	61.81	Kim Hyun	DPK	67,547	56.21	Seo Jeong-hyeon	PPP	45,645	37.98	21,902
Gyeonggi	27	Ansan C	61.08	Park Hae-cheol	DPK	59,317	54.18	Kim Myeong-yeon	PPP	47,175	43.09	12,142
Gyeonggi	28	Goyang A	67.70	Kim Seong-hoe	DPK	69,617	45.30	Han Chang-seop	PPP	54,308	35.34	15,309
Gyeonggi	29	Goyang B	69.90	Han Jun-ho	DPK	97,402	61.24	Jang Seok-hwan	PPP	59,375	37.33	38,027
Gyeonggi	30	Goyang C	67.25	Lee Ki-heon	DPK	85,134	54.06	Kim Jong-hyeok	PPP	72,332	45.93	12,802
Gyeonggi	31	Goyang D	69.28	Kim Young-hwan	DPK	85,660	54.89	Kim Yong-tae	PPP	70,387	45.10	15,273
Gyeonggi	32	Uiwang–Gwacheon	74.72	Lee So-young	DPK	81,640	54.37	Choi Ki-sik	PPP	68,508	45.62	13,132
Gyeonggi	33	Guri	68.76	Yun Ho-jung	DPK	59,331	53.97	Na Tae-geun	PPP	47,620	43.32	11,711
Gyeonggi	34	Namyangju A	63.54	Choi Min-hee	DPK	58,135	51.08	Yoo Nak-jun	PPP	40,670	35.73	17,465
Gyeonggi	35	Namyangju B	63.79	Kim Byeong-ju	DPK	75,031	56.94	Kwak Kwan-yong	PPP	53,774	40.81	21,257
Gyeonggi	36	Namyangju C	68.48	Kim Yong-min	DPK	83,387	54.58	Cho Kwang-han	PPP	64,539	42.24	18,848
Gyeonggi	37	Osan	60.20	Cha Ji-ho	DPK	67,619	59.01	Kim Hyo-eun	PPP	46,955	40.98	20,664
Gyeonggi	38	Siheung A	66.62	Moon Jeong-bok	DPK	88,676	60.81	Jeong Pil-jae	PPP	55,817	38.27	32,859
Gyeonggi	39	Siheung B	59.93	Cho Jeong-sik	DPK	71,207	56.53	Kim Yun-sik	PPP	49,828	39.56	21,379
Gyeonggi	40	Gunpo	70.45	Lee Hak-young	DPK	89,561	56.92	Choi Jin-hak	PPP	67,772	43.07	21,789
Gyeonggi	41	Hanam A	70.86	Choo Mi-ae	DPK	51,428	50.58	Lee Yong	PPP	50,229	49.41	1,199
Gyeonggi	42	Hanam B	68.59	Kim Yong-man	DPK	44,734	51.65	Lee Chang-keun	PPP	37,850	43.70	6,884
Gyeonggi	43	Yongin A	63.34	Lee Sang-sik	DPK	71,030	50.22	Lee Won-mo	PPP	61,995	43.83	9,035
Gyeonggi	44	Yongin B	69.21	Son Myoung-soo	DPK	87,739	55.70	Lee Sang-cheol	PPP	65,676	41.69	22,063
Gyeonggi	45	Yongin C	74.32	Boo Seung-chan	DPK	81,538	50.26	Go Seok	PPP	80,687	49.73	851
Gyeonggi	46	Yongin D	72.61	Lee Un-ju	DPK	82,156	51.06	Kang Cheol-ho	PPP	75,436	46.88	6,720
Gyeonggi	47	Paju A	65.08	Yoon Hu-deok	DPK	92,611	63.43	Park Yong-ho	PPP	53,374	36.56	39,237
Gyeonggi	48	Paju B	62.04	Park Jeong	DPK	64,741	54.83	Han Gil-ryong	PPP	53,314	45.16	11,427
Gyeonggi	49	Icheon	62.88	Song Seok-jun	PPP	60,191	51.33	Eom Tae-jun	DPK	57,070	48.66	3,121
Gyeonggi	50	Anseong	63.40	Yoon Jong-gun	DPK	52,517	50.71	Kim Hak-yong	PPP	49,049	47.36	3,468
Gyeonggi	51	Gimpo A	69.71	Kim Ju-young	DPK	69,836	54.27	Park Jin-ho	PPP	58,841	45.72	10,995
Gyeonggi	52	Gimpo B	64.72	Park Sang-hyuk	DPK	74,556	55.52	Hong Cheol-ho	PPP	59,717	44.47	14,839
Gyeonggi	53	Hwaseong A	62.06	Song Ok-ju	DPK	75,916	55.88	Hong Hyung-sun	PPP	59,921	44.11	15,995
Gyeonggi	54	Hwaseong B	72.69	Lee Jun-seok	RP	51,856	42.41	Gong Young-woon	DPK	48,578	39.73	3,278
Gyeonggi	55	Hwaseong C	63.66	Kwon Chil-seung	DPK	80,110	61.53	Choi Young-geun	PPP	48,360	37.14	31,750
Gyeonggi	56	Hwaseong D	68.93	Jeon Yong-gi	DPK	62,457	55.72	Yoo Kyung-joon	PPP	38,207	34.09	24,250
Gyeonggi	57	Gwangju A	64.32	So Byeong-hoon	DPK	58,631	56.33	Ham Kyung-woo	PPP	45,443	43.66	13,188
Gyeonggi	58	Gwangju B	62.49	An Tae-jun	DPK	57,935	55.06	Hwang Myung-joo	PPP	47,275	44.93	10,660
Gyeonggi	59	Pocheon–Gapyeong	64.54	Kim Yong-tae	PPP	59,192	50.47	Park Yoon-guk	DPK	56,715	48.36	2,477
Gyeonggi	60	Yeoju–Yangpyeong	66.85	Kim Seon-gyo	PPP	74,916	53.58	Choi Jae-kwan	DPK	64,893	46.41	10,023
Gangwon	1	Chuncheon–Cheorwon–Hwacheon–Yanggu A	67.49	Heo Young	DPK	70,273	53.44	Kim Hye-ran	PPP	58,542	44.52	11,731
Gangwon	2	Chuncheon–Cheorwon–Hwacheon–Yanggu B	66.61	Han Ki-ho	PPP	43,935	53.93	Jeon Seong	DPK	33,774	41.46	10,161
Gangwon	3	Wonju A	65.02	Park Jeong-ha	PPP	52,002	50.71	Won Chang-muk	DPK	50,534	49.28	1,468
Gangwon	4	Wonju B	66.59	Song Ki-hun	DPK	52,920	54.08	Kim Wan-seop	PPP	44,919	45.91	8,001
Gangwon	5	Gangneung	65.63	Kwon Seong-dong	PPP	64,743	54.24	Kim Jung-nam	DPK	51,731	43.34	13,012
Gangwon	6	Donghae–Taebaek–Samcheok–Jeongseon	65.82	Lee Cheol-gyu	PPP	78,325	61.22	Han Ho-yeon	DPK	46,674	36.48	31,651
Gangwon	7	Sokcho–Goseong–Yangyang–Inje	66.61	Lee Yang-soo	PPP	54,738	55.84	Kim Do-kyun	DPK	43,276	44.15	11,462
Gangwon	8	Hongcheon–Hoengseong–Yeongwol–Pyeongchang	69.11	Yoo Sang-beom	PPP	68,226	57.71	Heo Pil-hong	DPK	49,988	42.28	18,238
North Chungcheong	1	Sangdang, Cheongju	64.61	Lee Kang-il	DPK	55,602	51.45	Seo Seung-woo	PPP	49,905	46.18	5,697
North Chungcheong	2	Seowon, Cheongju	65.75	Lee Goang-hee	DPK	54,835	52.46	Kim Jin-mo	PPP	49,688	47.53	5,147
North Chungcheong	3	Heungdeok, Cheongju	61.28	Lee Yeon-hee	DPK	72,375	51.76	Kim Dong-won	PPP	62,334	44.58	10,041
North Chungcheong	4	Cheongwon, Cheongju	63.08	Song Jae-bong	DPK	52,620	53.28	Kim Su-min	PPP	46,129	46.71	6,491
North Chungcheong	5	Chungju	65.87	Lee Jong-bae	PPP	60,314	51.11	Kim Kyung-wook	DPK	57,682	48.88	2,632
North Chungcheong	6	Jecheon–Danyang	68.26	Eom Tae-young	PPP	46,532	49.43	Lee Kyung-yong	DPK	39,007	41.44	7,525
North Chungcheong	7	Boeun–Okcheon–Yeongdong–Goesan	72.50	Park Duk-hyum	PPP	55,234	52.93	Lee Jae-han	DPK	49,112	47.06	6,122
North Chungcheong	8	Jeungpyeong–Jincheon–Eumseong	63.14	Lim Ho-seon	DPK	62,370	53.95	Gyeong Dae-su	PPP	53,230	46.04	9,140
South Chungcheong	1	Cheonan A	59.66	Moon Jin-seok	DPK	64,562	50.58	Shin Beom-cheol	PPP	60,178	47.15	4,384
South Chungcheong	2	Cheonan B	59.32	Lee Jae-kwan	DPK	58,862	55.12	Lee Jung-man	PPP	44,628	41.79	14,234
South Chungcheong	3	Cheonan C	63.20	Lee Jeong-mun	DPK	53,189	55.20	Lee Chang-soo	PPP	40,098	41.61	13,091
South Chungcheong	4	Gongju–Buyeo–Cheongyang	71.89	Park Soo-hyun	DPK	62,635	50.66	Jeong Jin-seok	PPP	59,855	48.42	2,780
South Chungcheong	5	Boryeong–Seocheon	71.04	Jang Dong-hyeok	PPP	46,505	51.50	Na So-yeol	DPK	42,802	47.40	3,703
South Chungcheong	6	Asan A	63.03	Bok Ki-wang	DPK	42,153	53.79	Kim Young-seok	PPP	34,555	44.09	7,598
South Chungcheong	7	Asan B	61.58	Kang Hoon-sik	DPK	58,932	60.35	Jeon Man-kwon	PPP	38,716	39.64	20,216
South Chungcheong	8	Seosan–Taean	67.79	Seong Il-jong	PPP	70,487	51.55	Cho Han-ki	DPK	66,222	48.44	4,265
South Chungcheong	9	Nonsan–Gyeryong–Geumsan	67.57	Hwang Myong-sun	DPK	61,146	50.84	Park Sung-kyu	PPP	56,706	47.15	4,440
South Chungcheong	10	Dangjin	62.89	Eo Gi-gu	DPK	46,157	51.78	Jeong Yong-seon	PPP	42,983	48.21	3,174
South Chungcheong	11	Hongseong–Yesan	68.16	Kang Seung-kyu	PPP	57,043	54.84	Yang Seung-jo	DPK	46,972	45.15	10,071
North Jeolla	1	Jeonju A	66.45	Kim Yoon-duk	DPK	83,081	77.59	Yang Jeong-mu	PPP	12,867	12.01	70,214
North Jeolla	2	Jeonju B	67.89	Lee Seong-yun	DPK	74,038	66.38	Jeong Un-cheon	PPP	23,014	20.63	51,024
North Jeolla	3	Jeonju C	68.31	Chung Dong-young	DPK	117,407	82.08	Jeon Hee-jae	PPP	17,589	12.29	99,818
North Jeolla	4	Gunsan-Gimje–Buan A	63.33	Shin Young-dae	DPK	115,297	86.73	Oh Ji-sung	PPP	17,639	13.26	97,658
North Jeolla	5	Gunsan-Gimje–Buan B	68.40	Lee Won-taek	DPK	72,455	86.63	Choi Hong-woo	PPP	8,007	9.57	64,448
North Jeolla	6	Iksan A	66.01	Lee Choon-suak	DPK	58,984	77.11	Kim Min-seo	PPP	7,743	10.12	51,241
North Jeolla	7	Iksan B	65.34	Han Byeong-do	DPK	65,027	87.03	Moon Yong-hoe	PPP	8,288	11.09	56,739
North Jeolla	8	Jeongeup–Gochang	68.28	Yoon Jun-byeong	DPK	79,593	86.86	Choi Yong-woon	PPP	9,595	10.47	69,998
North Jeolla	9	Namwon–Jangsu–Imsil–Sunchang	71.97	Park Hee-seung	DPK	79,169	83.83	Kang Byung-mu	PPP	11,035	11.68	68,134
North Jeolla	10	Wanju–Jinan–Muju	69.30	Ahn Ho-young	DPK	73,236	84.23	Lee In-sook	PPP	13,703	15.76	59,533
South Jeolla	1	Mokpo	64.92	Kim Won-i	DPK	82,700	71.43	Lee Yoon-seok	Ind	15,811	13.65	66,889
South Jeolla	2	Yeosu A	66.54	Jo Cheol-hyeon	DPK	69,092	88.89	Park Jung-sook	PPP	8,633	11.10	60,459
South Jeolla	3	Yeosu B	67.65	Cho Gye-won	DPK	51,811	68.01	Kwon Oh-bong	Ind	17,044	22.37	34,767
South Jeolla	4	Suncheon–Gwangyang–Gokseong–Gurye A	70.03	Kim Moon-soo	DPK	85,172	64.34	Lee Seong-su	PP	23,890	18.04	61,282
South Jeolla	5	Suncheon–Gwangyang–Gokseong–Gurye B	69.10	Kwon Hyang-yeop	DPK	104,493	70.09	Lee Jung-hyun	PPP	35,283	23.66	69,210
South Jeolla	6	Naju–Hwasun	68.97	Shin Jeong-hun	DPK	74,063	71.06	An Ju-yong	PP	20,593	19.75	53,470
South Jeolla	7	Damyang–Hampyeong–Yeonggwang–Jangseong	72.48	Lee Gae-ho	DPK	61,042	56.46	Lee Seok-hyung	Ind	38,827	35.91	22,215
South Jeolla	8	Goheung–Boseong–Jangheung–Gangjin	71.33	Mun Geum-ju	DPK	95,357	90.69	Kim Hyung-joo	PPP	9,780	9.30	85,577
South Jeolla	9	Haenam–Wando–Jindo	69.82	Park Jie-won	DPK	78,324	92.35	Kwak Bong-geun	PPP	6,481	7.64	71,843
South Jeolla	10	Yeongam–Muan–Sinan	69.25	Seo Sam-seok	DPK	73,053	69.17	Baek Jae-wook	Ind	21,651	20.50	51,402
North Gyeongsang	1	Buk, Pohang	64.79	Kim Jung-jae	PPP	91,249	62.33	Oh Joong-ki	DPK	42,311	28.90	48,938
North Gyeongsang	2	Nam, Pohang-Ulleung	61.83	Lee Sang-hwi	PPP	86,740	70.03	Kim Sang-heon	DPK	37,120	29.96	49,620
North Gyeongsang	3	Gyeongju	65.37	Kim Seok-gi	PPP	92,074	65.77	Han Young-tae	DPK	33,968	24.26	58,106
North Gyeongsang	4	Gimcheon	66.82	Song Eon-seok	PPP	51,208	65.78	Hwang Tae-seong	DPK	18,079	23.22	33,129
North Gyeongsang	5	Andong–Yecheon	67.45	Kim Hyeong-dong	PPP	81,040	67.47	Kim Sang-woo	DPK	34,748	28.93	46,292
North Gyeongsang	6	Gumi A	61.51	Gu Ja-keun	PPP	76,100	72.58	Kim Cheol-ho	DPK	28,749	27.41	47,351
North Gyeongsang	7	Gumi B	57.80	Kang Myeon-ku	PPP	61,166	65.29	Kim Hyun-kwon	DPK	31,261	33.36	29,905
North Gyeongsang	8	Yeongju–Yeongyang–Bonghwa	68.74	Lim Jong-deuk	PPP	64,325	73.71	Park Kyu-hwan	DPK	22,933	26.28	41,392
North Gyeongsang	9	Yeongcheon–Cheongdo	69.09	Lee Man-hee	PPP	54,987	62.88	Lee Young-soo	DPK	17,083	19.53	37,904
North Gyeongsang	10	Sangju–Mungyeong	69.43	Lim Lee-ja	PPP	76,583	77.64	Lee Yoon-hee	DPK	18,578	18.83	58,005
North Gyeongsang	11	Gyeongsan	63.48	Cho Ji-yeon	PPP	62,411	43.43	Choi Kyung-hwan	Ind	60,746	42.27	1,665
North Gyeongsang	12	Uiseong–Cheongsong–Yeongdeok–Uljin	70.97	Park Hyeong-soo	PPP	80,495	83.33	Shim Tae-seong	Ind	16,098	16.66	64,397
North Gyeongsang	13	Goryeong–Seongju–Chilgok	64.40	Jeong Hee-yong	PPP	77,692	76.23	Jeong Seok-won	DPK	21,901	21.49	55,791
South Gyeongsang	1	Uichang, Changwon	67.12	Kim Jong-yang	PPP	69,210	57.30	Kim Ji-soo	DPK	51,560	42.69	17,650
South Gyeongsang	2	Seongsan, Changwon	70.51	Heo Seong-mu	DPK	67,489	46.38	Kang Ki-yoon	PPP	66,507	45.70	982
South Gyeongsang	3	Masanhappo, Changwon	67.40	Choi Hyeong-du	PPP	66,283	64.04	Lee Ok-seon	DPK	37,205	35.95	29,078
South Gyeongsang	4	Masanhoewon, Changwon	68.87	Yoon Han-hong	PPP	63,778	59.77	Song Soon-ho	DPK	42,924	40.22	20,854
South Gyeongsang	5	Jinhae, Changwon	65.08	Lee Jong-uk	PPP	51,100	50.24	Hwang Ki-cheol	DPK	50,603	49.75	497
South Gyeongsang	6	Jinju A	68.87	Park Dae-chul	PPP	66,339	58.30	Gal Sang-don	DPK	47,450	41.69	18,889
South Gyeongsang	7	Jinju B	67.46	Kang Min-gook	PPP	45,590	56.13	Han Kyung-ho	DPK	24,540	30.21	21,050
South Gyeongsang	8	Tongyeong–Goseong	68.62	Jeong Jeom-sik	PPP	61,251	61.45	Kang Seok-ju	DPK	38,424	38.54	22,827
South Gyeongsang	9	Sacheon–Namhae–Hadong	69.96	Seo Cheon-ho	PPP	64,750	55.58	Je Yoon-kyung	DPK	37,664	32.33	27,086
South Gyeongsang	10	Gimhae A	64.10	Min Hong-cheol	DPK	73,901	52.47	Park Seong-ho	PPP	66,921	47.52	6,980
South Gyeongsang	11	Gimhae B	65.06	Kim Jeong-ho	DPK	80,695	56.19	Cho Hae-jin	PPP	62,904	43.80	17,791
South Gyeongsang	12	Miryang–Uiryeong–Haman–Changnyeong	67.35	Park Sang-woong	PPP	96,450	66.85	Woo Seo-young	DPK	47,811	33.14	48,639
South Gyeongsang	13	Geoje	67.55	Seo Il-jun	PPP	65,590	51.23	Byun Kwang-yong	DPK	59,753	46.67	5,837
South Gyeongsang	14	Yangsan A	66.66	Yoon Young-seok	PPP	53,560	53.61	Lee Jae-young	DPK	44,735	44.78	8,825
South Gyeongsang	15	Yangsan B	68.49	Kim Tae-ho	PPP	50,685	51.05	Kim Doo-kwan	DPK	48,600	48.94	2,085
South Gyeongsang	16	Sancheong–Hamyang–Geochang–Hapcheon	70.18	Shin Seong-beom	PPP	75,582	70.99	Kim Ki-tae	DPK	30,881	29.00	44,701
Jeju Province	1	Jeju A	59.66	Moon Dae-rim	DPK	78,776	62.88	Ko Gwang-cheol	PPP	46,503	37.11	32,273
Jeju Province	2	Jeju B	63.22	Kim Han-kyu	DPK	78,774	64.64	Kim Seung-wook	PPP	38,948	31.96	39,826
Jeju Province	3	Seogwipo	64.79	Wi Seong-gon	DPK	53,831	54.00	Koh Ki-cheol	PPP	45,841	45.99	7,990

=== By proportional representation list ===
Party	Candidates	Elected	Elected candidates
People Future Party	35	18	Park Chung-kwon; Choi Soo-jin; Jin Jong-oh; Kang Sun-young; Kim Geon; Kim So-hee; Ihn Yo-han; Kim Min-jeon; Kim Ui-sang; Han Ji-ah; Yoo Yong-won; Cho Bae-sook; Kim Jang-gyum; Kim Yea-ji; Ahn Sang-hoon; Lee Dal-hee; Park Jun-tae
Democratic Alliance	30	14	Seo Mi-hwa (Independent); Wi Sung-rak (Democratic Party); Baek Seung-a (Democratic Party); Lim Gwang-hyeon (Democratic Party); Jeong Hye-kyung (Progressive Party); Yong Hye-in (New Progressive Alliance); Oh Se-hee (Democratic Party); Park Hong-bae (Democratic Party); Kang You-jung (Democratic Party); Han Chang-min (New Progressive Alliance); Jeon Jong-deok (Progressive Party); Kim Yoon (Independent); Lim Mi-ae (Democratic Party); Jeong Eul-ho (Democratic Party)
Rebuilding Korea Party	25	12	Park Eun-jeong; Cho Kuk; Lee Hai-min; Shin Jang-sik; Kim Seon-min; Kim Jun-hyeong; Kim Jae-won; Hwang Un-ha; Jung Choon-saeng; Cha Kyu-geun; Kang Gyeong-sook; Seo Wang-jin
Reform Party	10	2	Lee Joo-young; Cheon Ha-ram
Liberal Unification Party	20	0	
Green–Justice Party	14	0	
New Future Party	11	0	
Pine Tree Party	8	0	
Grand National Party	8	0	
National Revolutionary Party	10	0	
Saenuri Party	1	0	
Freedom and Democracy Party	7	0	
Christian Party	2	0	
Grand National Unity Party	2	0	
Our Republican Party	8	0	
Great Korea Party	7	0	
Women's Party	1	0	
Hashtag People's Policy Party	1	0	
Labor Party	2	0	
Financial Reform Party	1	0	
Senior Welfare Party	5	0	
Republican Party	1	0	
Hongik Party	2	0	
Korea Farmers and Fishermen's Party	2	0	
Korea People's Party	4	0	
To Tomorrow, to the Future	7	0	
Republic of Korea Party	2	0	
Unification Korea Party	2	0	
Let's Go Korea	2	0	
Popular Democratic Party	5	0	
Gihuminsaeng Party	1	0	
Party for the Abolition of Special Privileges	2	0	
Korean Wave Union Party	3	0	
Korea Business Party	4	0	
K Political Innovation Union Party	4	0	
New Korean Peninsula Party	2	0	

=== Voter turnout by region ===
Voter turnout by province (accumulate)
Region	Electorate	Early Vote				Overall	
Region	Electorate	5 April		6 April		10 April	
Region	Electorate	Voter	%	Voter	%	Voter	%
Seoul	8,310,021	1,315,890	15.83	2,711,316	32.63	5,758,313	69.3
Busan	2,884,261	427,839	14.83	852,871	29.57	1,947,669	67.5
Daegu	2,051,656	251,503	12.26	525,222	25.60	1,312,872	64.0
Incheon	2,582,765	374,537	14.50	776,408	30.06	1,686,974	65.3
Gwangju	1,199,920	239,483	19.96	455,962	38.00	818,372	68.2
Daejeon	1,236,801	181,300	14.66	374,206	30.26	819,636	66.3
Ulsan	934,661	138,305	14.80	281,659	30.13	625,088	66.9
Sejong	301,297	51,184	16.99	110,888	36.80	211,405	70.2
Gyeonggi	11,595,385	1,627,194	14.03	3,425,648	29.54	7,732,236	66.7
Gangwon	1,331,959	235,574	17.69	434,704	32.64	887,434	66.6
North Chungcheong	1,372,679	215,419	15.69	420,624	30.64	895,768	65.2
South Chungcheong	1,825,472	286,637	15.70	552,098	30.24	1,185,939	65.0
North Jeolla	1,517,738	324,150	21.36	583,724	38.46	1,022,602	67.4
South Jeolla	1,565,232	370,442	23.67	644,774	41.19	1,080,202	69.0
North Gyeongsang	2,224,011	361,141	16.24	683,836	30.75	1,447,739	65.1
South Gyeongsang	2,779,542	424,367	15.27	853,610	30.71	1,877,784	67.6
Jeju	566,611	85,545	15.10	161,493	28.50	352,541	62.2
Overall total	44,280,011	6,910,510	15.61	13,849,043	31.28	29,662,313	67.0

=== Incumbents who lost re-election ===
Members of Parliament who lost re-election
MP	Seat	First elected	Party	New MP	New party
Kim Hack-yong	Anseong	2008 (Note: Kim lost his seat in 2020 but was re-elected through a by-election in March 2022)	People Power	Yoon Jong-kun	Democratic
Sul Hoon (Note: Originally elected as a member of the Democratic Party)	Bucheon B	1996 (Note: Sul was initially elected in Dobong B from 1996 to 2004. He did not stand for election in 2004 or 2008, but did stand in 2012 in Bucheon Wonmi B. This seat was renamed Bucheon B in 2016.)	New Future	Kim Gi-pyo	Democratic
Kim Byung-wook	Bundang B	2016	Democratic	Kim Eun-hye	People Power
Hong Young-pyo	Bupyeong B	2009 by-election	New Future	Park Seon-won	Democratic
Kang Gi-yun	Changwon Seongsan	2012 (Note: Kang was first elected in 2012, but lost his seat in 2016 and was re-elected in 2020)	People Power	Heo Seong-moo	Democratic
Park Young-soon	Daedeok	2020	New Future	Park Jeong-hyeon	Democratic
Kwon Myung-ho	Dong, Ulsan	2020	People Power	Kim Tae-sun	Democratic
Chung Jin-suk	Gongju–Buyeo–Cheongyang	2000 (Note: Chung moved to proportional representation in 2008, resigning in 2010 to become the Senior Political Secretary to the President, and then lost in Seoul's Jung District in 2012. He was re-elected in this district in 2016 and 2020)	People Power	Park Soo-hyun	Democratic
Sim Sang-jeong	Goyang A	2004 (Note: Sim was initially elected under proportional representation in 2004, losing her seat in 2008. She was elected to this seat in 2012 and re-elected in 2016 and 2020.)	Justice	Kim Sung-hoi	Democratic
Thae Yong-ho	Guro A (Note: Thae had represented Gangnam A as an incumbent, but ran for re-election in Guro A.)	2020	People Power	Lee In-young (Note: Lee was the incumbent in Guro A.)	Democratic
Lee Won-uk	Hwaseong D	2012	Reform Party	Jeon Yong-gi	Democratic
Kang Sung-hee	Jeonju B	2023 by-election	Progressive	Lee Sung-yoon	Democratic
Choi Jae-hyung	Jongno	2022 (March) by-election	People Power	Kwak Sang-eon	Democratic
Park Jae-ho	Nam District, Busan	2016	Democratic	Park Soo-young	People Power
Cho Eung-chun	Namyangju A	2016	Reform Party	Choi Min-hee	Democratic
Hwangbo Seung-hee (Note: Originally elected as a member of the People Power Party)	Proportional Representation (Note: Originally elected as constituency member for Jung-Yeongdo)	2020	Liberal Unification Party	Not applicable	
Choi In-ho	Saha A	2016	Democratic	Lee Sang-gwon	People Power
Kim Doo-kwan	Yangsan B	2016 (Note: Kim was first elected at Gimpo A District in 2016 but was re-elected in 2020 at Yangsan B District)	Democratic	Kim Tae-ho	People Power
Kim Young-joo	Yeongdeungpo A	2004 (Note: Kim was originally elected as a proportional member in 2004. She ran for Yeondeungpo A in 2008, being defeated, before being elected in the same district in 2012 and re-elected in 2016 and 2020.)	People Power	Chae Hyeon-il	Democratic
Yang Hyang-ja	Yongin A	2020	Reform Party	Lee Sang-sik	Democratic
Lee Sang-min	Yuseong B	2004	People Power	Hwang Jung-a	Democratic

== Reactions ==
Following the release of exit polls, Han Dong-hoon expressed disappointment over the People Power Party's losses in the election. Cho Kuk called the results of the Rebuilding Korea Party's campaign the "victory of the people" and said it showed the people can "no longer put up with the regression" of the Yoon administration. Cho also called on President Yoon to "apologize for the numerous misdeeds and corruption", and pledged to introduce a special investigation bill against Han Dong-hoon once the new session of the National Assembly is formed. Lee Jae-myung expressed thanks for the Democratic Party's showing, calling it "a great victory for our people", and said the party will "humbly watch the people's choices to the end".

On 11 April Prime Minister Han Duck-soo, presidential chief of staff Lee Kwan-sup, and other senior presidential advisers, with the exception of those in charge of security issues, offered their resignations to Yoon, who pledged to "humbly uphold" the election result and focus on improving the economy and reforming state affairs. In a separate statement, Han Dong-hoon also resigned as head of the People Power Party and took responsibility for its defeat in the election. That same day, Green-Justice leader Sim Sang-jung announced her retirement from politics. Sim, who ran twice for president in 2017 and 2022, was a four-term lawmaker under various minor left-wing parties. In her announcement, Sim assumed responsibility for the party losing all six seats and falling below the 3% required for proportional representation.

In his first public remarks since the election on 16 April, President Yoon reiterated his acceptance of the election result and pledged to "communicate more with a humbler and more flexible attitude, and be the first to listen carefully to the public sentiment."

== Analysis ==
According to Shin Yul, a professor of political science at Myongji University, the election results would likely lead to "extreme confrontation", stating that it "won't be easy for people to see bipartisan cooperation".

Overall, the opposition bloc (including the Rebuilding Korea Party and New Future, which are both led by former members of the Democratic Party and are considerably anti-Yoon) did not receive enough seats to threaten the impeachment of Yoon, which would have required a two-thirds majority, or 200 seats. They won a combined total of 189 against the government alliance and Reform (who are more moderately conservative and big tent) total of 111. Nevertheless, the election result, and overwhelming majority in favor of the governmental opposition, was enough to effectively block any government plans going into the future. The Diplomat described Yoon Suk-yeol as a "lame duck" for his remaining three years in office. Chae Jin-won of Humanitas College at Kyung Hee University stated that "If Yoon can't find a way to work with the opposition, there is a likelihood of impeachment, which some factions in the ruling party may comply with for the sake of their own political futures."

== See also ==
- List of members of the National Assembly (South Korea), 2024–2028
- 2024 North Korean parliamentary election
