= Popular Democratic Party (South Korea) =

2024–2026 political party in South Korea

- Abbreviation: Popular Party
- Leader: Vacant
- Secretary-General: Vacant
- Founder: Son Soo-kyung
- Registered: 21 March 2024
- Dissolved: 2 October 2026 (registration cancelled)
- Headquarters: 330, Hangang-daero, Yongsan-gu, Seoul
- Membership (2024): 5,508
- Ideology: Centrism; Regionalism (Honam)
- Political position: Centre
- Colors: Yellow; Blue
- National Assembly: 0 / 300
- Metropolitan Mayors and Governors: 0 / 16
- Municipal Mayors: 0 / 227
- Provincial and Metropolitan Councillors: 0 / 933
- Municipal Councillors: 0 / 3,034

Korean name
- Hangul: 대중민주당
- Hanja: 大衆民主黨
- RR: Daejung minjudang
- MR: Taejung minjudang

The Popular Democratic Party (Korean: 대중민주당) was a South Korean political party founded in 2024. The party registration was cancelled on 2 October 2026.

In the 2024 South Korean legislative election the party ran five proportional representation candidates.

The party stated it represented small and medium-sized business owners and self-employed individuals by inheriting the spirit of former president Kim Dae-jung. The party pledged to expand financial support for policies assisting small business owners, such as the Credit Guarantee Foundation fund and the Yellow Umbrella Mutual Aid.

The party also pledged to establish an AI Support Agency and promote youth participation in politics.

The party elected Son Soo-kyung as its first leader.

The party leader stated in the 2024 South Korean legislative election that she would vote for the Democratic Party of Korea for constituency whilst the Popular Democratic Party for proportional representation.

On 2 October 2026, the National Election Commission announced the parties registration was cancelled under Article 44, Paragraph 1, subparagraph 1 of the Political Parties Act, relating to insufficient number of members and party chapters.

== Election results ==
=== National Assembly elections ===
Year	Election	Constituency seats		Proportional representation		Total seats	
		Seats won	Vote share	Seats won	Vote share	Seats won	Seat share
2024	22nd	0/254	0%	0/46	0.02%	0/300	0%
