= Centre Innovation Party =

Political party in South Korea

- Leader: Kim Jung-il; Lee Ki-nam
- Founded: February 29, 2024
- Registered: March 7, 2024
- Headquarters: Room 302, 166 Yeongsin-ro, Yeongdeungpo-gu, Seoul
- Membership (2024): 5,233
- Political position: Centre
- Colors: Purple
- National Assembly: 0 / 300
- Metropolitan Mayors and Governors: 0 / 16
- Municipal Mayors: 0 / 227
- Provincial and Metropolitan Councillors: 0 / 933
- Municipal Councillors: 0 / 3,034

Website
- www.kparty.co.kr

Korean name
- Hangul: 중도혁신당
- Hanja: 中道革新黨
- RR: Jungdo hyeoksindang
- MR: Chungdo hyŏksindang

The Centre Innovation Party (Korean: 중도혁신당; Hanja: 中道革新黨) is a South Korean political party founded in 2024. Originally established as the National Policy Party. Ahead of the 2024 South Korean legislative election, it changed its name to the Hashtag National Policy Party (#국민정책당), and it adopted its current name in 2025.

The party describes itself as a policy-focused party rather than a left or right party. According to the party's platform, the ideological conflict between conservatives and progressives comes from two values freedom (conservatives) and equality (progressives), the party argues that these are not mutually exclusive and both concepts are essential for society to develop.

== Election results ==
Year	Election	Constituency		Proportional representation		Total	
Year	Election	Seats won	Vote share	Seats won	Vote share	Seats won	Vote share
2024	22nd	0 / 254	0%	0 / 46	0.09%	0 / 300	0%
