= Oh Yeong-hwan =

South Korean politician

- 오영환
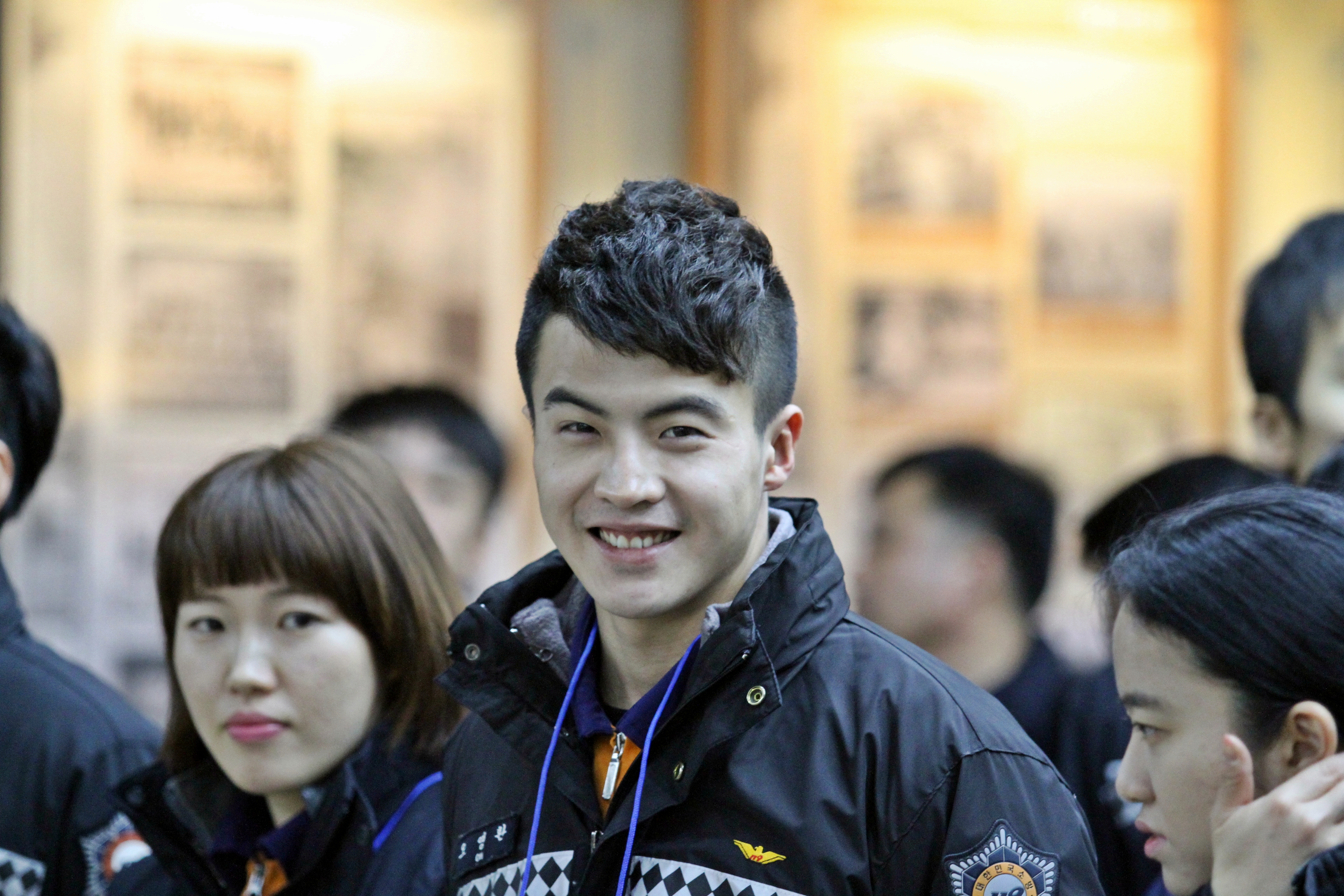
- Oh in 2015

Member of the National Assembly
- Incumbent
- Assumed office 30 May 2020
- Preceded by: Moon Hee-sang
- Constituency: Gyeonggi Uijeongbu A

Personal details
- Born: 10 February 1988 (age 38) Dongducheon, South Korea
- Party: New Future Party
- Other political affiliations: Democratic (until 2024)
- Spouse: Kim Ja-in
- Occupation: Firefighter, politician
- Religion: Roman Catholic (Christian name: Florian)

Oh Yeong-hwan (Korean: 오영환; February 10, 1988) is a South Korean firefighter, essayist, and politician. He first served as a military firefighter before being hired as a civilian firefighter in Seoul in 2010. There he worked at the Gwangjin Fire Station, the 119 Special Rescue Team, the Seongbuk Fire Station, and the National 119 Rescue Headquarters. After retiring from the fire service in 2019, he was named the 5th Democratic Party Recruitment Personnel in 2020.

== Early life and education ==
Born in Busan in 1988, he and his sister were born a father who was a lieutenant in the South Korean reserve army. After being discharged, his father experienced economic hardship, which put Oh's family into a difficult financial state before he had entered elementary school.

While attending high school, he came to idolize firefighters as heroes. He joined the Korea Disaster Prevention Engineering Co. Ltd., a fire prevention hardware company, installing and repairing fire-prevention fixtures such as induction lamps and detectors.

While in the military, He worked under the Haeundae Beach 119 Marine Rescue Team and Haeundae Fire Station, Busan Fire Headquarters. In December 2015, he wrote an essay called A Firefighter's Prayer which tells the story of his experiences as a firefighter and his hopes for a better future.

== Meeting novelist Kim Hoon ==
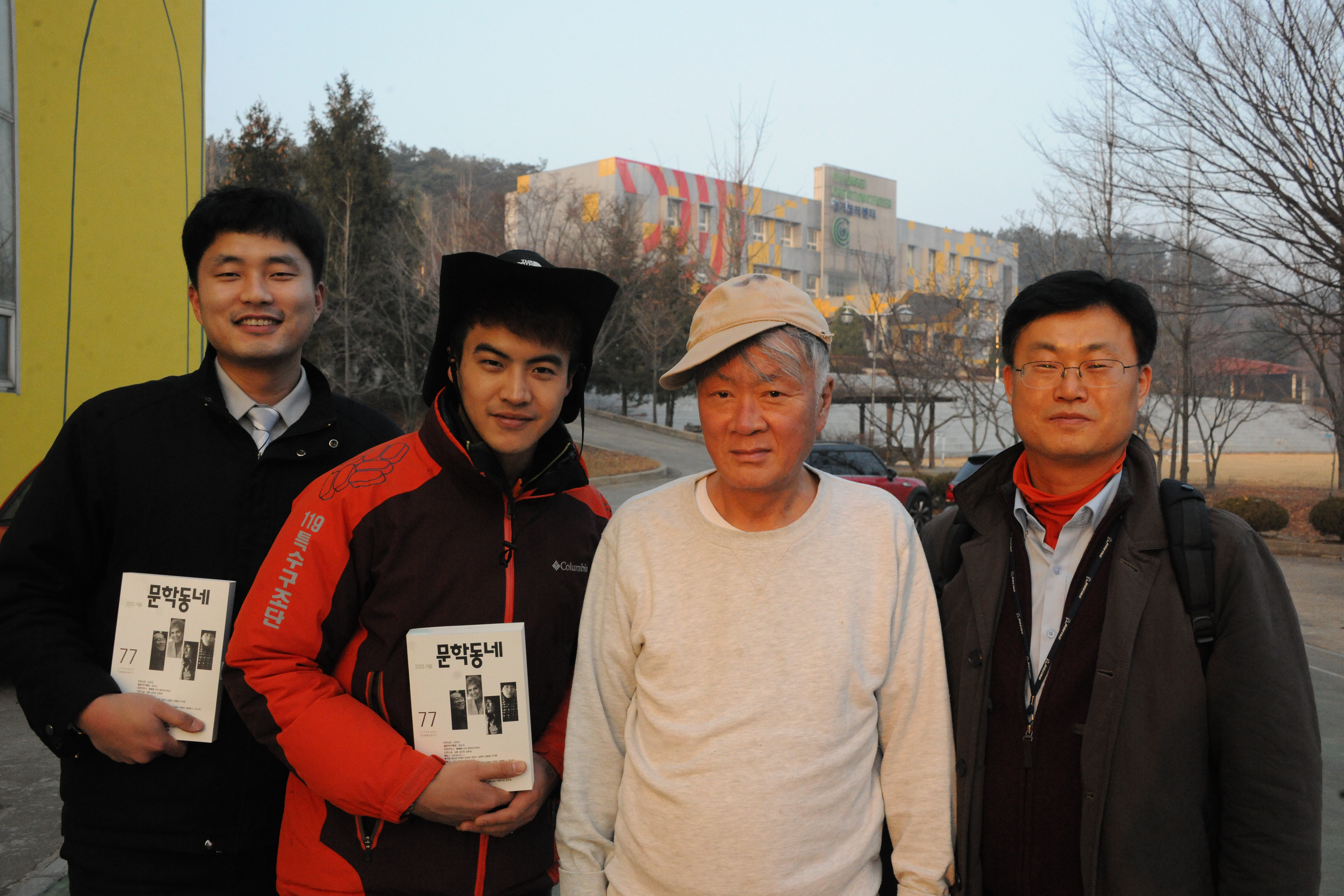
Oh with Kim Hoon, 2013

Since high school, Oh had been a fan of novelist Kim Hoon's writing. Oh Yeong-hwan introduced himself to Kim at a lecture in 2013, and the two began correspondence. Oh sent Kim an essay; A Dream of an Auxiliary Firefighter, which tells the story of his childhood and military service as a firefighter. Kim later told Oh that his essay served as inspiration for his short story "Hands", published in the winter edition of Munhakdongne.

== Career ==
- Rescue team, Haeundae Fire Station, Busan
- Rescuer, Gwangjin Fire Station, Seoul
- Dobongsan Mountain Rescue Team, 119 Special Rescue Team, Seoul
- Paramedics in Seongbuk Fire Station, Seoul
- Fire Department Rescue Team

== Personal life ==
He is married to Kim Ja-in, a professional rock climber.

== Electoral history ==
Election	Year	District	Party affiliation	Votes	Percentage of votes	Results
21st National Assembly General Election	2020	Gyeonggi Uijeongbu A	Democratic Party	54,806	53.0%	Won
