= Liberal Unification Party =

Political party in South Korea

Liberal Unification Party 자유통일당
- Leader: Chang Kyung-dong
- Secretary-General: Lee Dong-ho
- Floor Leader: Hwangbo Seung-hee
- Chair of the Policy Planning Committee: Yoo Jae-il
- Founded: March 3, 2016
- Headquarters: Room 1012, Korean Christian Building, Daehangno 19, Jongno-gu, Seoul
- Ideology: Christian conservatism; Religious conservatism
- Political position: Far-right
- Religion: Evangelicalism
- National Assembly: 0 / 300
- Metropolitan mayors and governors: 0 / 16

Website
- clparty.kr

- Liberal Unification Party
- Hangul: 자유통일당
- Hanja: 自由統一黨
- RR: Jayu tongildang
- MR: Chayu t'ongildang

The Liberal Unification Party, also translated as the Liberty Unification Party (Korean: 자유통일당; Hanja: 自由統一黨), is a far-right, evangelical political party in South Korea established in 2016. Representatives of a range of Christian organizations, including the evangelical Christian Council of Korea and the Communion of Churches in Korea, attended the party's founding convention.

The party has changed its name multiple times. The party was founded in 2016 as the Christian Liberty Party (Korean: 기독자유당), and later added "unification" to its name in 2020, renaming to Christian Liberty Unification Party (Korean: 기독자유통일당; Hanja: 基督自由統一黨; RR: Gidokjayutongildang). In 2021, the party took on the name National Revolutionary Party. In 2022, the party came to its current name, Liberty Unification Party.

== Party history ==
=== Legislative elections ===
The party had one representative in the 19th National Assembly, Lee Yun-seok, formerly a member of the Minjoo Party of Korea. Announcing his defection to the new party, Lee stated that the Korean church was being threatened by the intrusion of homosexuality and Islamic culture. The party also promotes the restoration of laws against adultery. In a party advertisement for the 2016 parliamentary elections, actress Seo Jung-hee stated that "the revival of adultery law is a quintessential issue", and that voters should "support [the] CLP to protect our families from homosexuality and Muslims." While campaigning during the 20th session of the National Assembly, the CLUP issued leaflets distributed to Korean households that made Islamophobic statements, claiming that Muslims in Korea will make Korea a "terrorist state", that Muslims will rape Korean women, and that they pose a security threat to the nation.

The CLUP was represented in the 20th Session of the National Assembly with one MP: Lee Eun-Jae. Lee Eun-Jae is a former parliamentarian in the 18th and 20th Session. In 2008 18th National Assembly election, she was elected as a proportional representative of the Grand National Party. During her time, she was estranged from the ruling conservative party for physically assaulting Unified Progressive Party MP Lee Jung-Hee. On March 23, 2020, Lee Eun-Jae left the main conservative party and became the first parliamentarian for the CLUP. However, she was swiftly kicked out because it was found out that Lee is actually Buddhist. Lee then worked for the Korea Economic Party (한국경제당) and is no longer a member of parliament, losing the 2020 South Korean legislative election.

Lee Yun-seok and Lee Eun-jae only had brief stints with the Party, both leaving the Party within six months and never representing the CLUP in an election campaign.

The Liberty Unification Party was once again represented in Parliament after former People Power lawmaker Hwangbo Seung-hee joined the Party on 8 March 2024. Hwangbo contested the April 2024 Parliament election as a proportional representative candidate for the Party, but lost her seat.

== Election results ==
=== Legislature ===
Election	Leader	Constituency				Party list				Seats		Position	Status
Election	Leader	Votes	%	Seats	+/-	Votes	%	Seats	+/-	No.	+/–	Position	Status
2016	Son Yeong-gu	1,376	0.01	New	0 / 253	626,853	2.64	New	0 / 47	0 / 300	New	▲5th	Extra-parliamentary
2020	Son Yeong-gu	7,663	0.03	▲0.02	0 / 253	513,159	1.84	▼0.80	0 / 47	0 / 300	0	▼7th	Extra-parliamentary
2024	Jeon Kwang-hoon	18,700	0.06	▲0.03	0 / 254	642,433	2.27	▲0.43	0 / 46	0 / 300	0	▲5th	Extra-parliamentary

== Logos ==
Christian Liberal Party

Christian Liberty Unification Party

National Revolutionary Party
