= New Future Democratic Party =

New Future Democratic Party 새미래민주당
- Leader: Jun Byung-hun
- Chair of the Policy Planning Committee: Jang Duck-chun
- Founder: Lee Nak-yon
- Founded: 4 February 2024 (Note: Part of the Reform Party from 9 February to 20 February 2024)
- Split from: Democratic Party of Korea
- Membership (April 2025): 100,000
- Ideology: Centrist reformism
- Political position: Centre
- Colours: Turquoise; Blue; Historical: Prussian Blue
- National Assembly: 0 / 300
- Metropolitan Mayors and Governors: 0 / 16
- Municipal Mayors: 0 / 227
- Provincial and Metropolitan Councillors: 0 / 933
- Municipal Councillors: 0 / 3,034

Website
- www.saeminjoo.com

The New Future Democratic Party (Korean: 새미래민주당) is a South Korean political party formed by an anti-Lee Jae-myung faction from the Democratic Party led by former Prime Minister Lee Nak-yon. Originally founded as the New Future Party (새로운미래), the party was renamed on 7 September 2024.

== History ==
Early logo of New Future Party

The party was founded on 4 February 2024 by former Democratic Party leader and Prime Minister Lee Nak-yon, who had grown critical of then Democratic Party leader Lee Jae-myung. The initial leadership consisted of a co-leadership between Lee Nak-yon and Kim Jong-min.

The party merged with Lee Jun-seok's newly founded Reform Party on 9 February with new party being led by Lee Nak-yon and Lee Jun-seok. However, on 20 February, Lee Nak-yon and the New Future Party announced their withdrawal from the merger with the New Reform Party, with members who had joined the Reform Party re-joining the re-established New Future Party.

On 11 March 2024, Hong Young-pyo, the member for Incheon Bupyong B in the National Assembly, officially joined the party. An additional two members of the National Assembly; Oh Yeong-hwan and Sul Hoon joined the party on 17 March.

In the 2024 South Korean legislative election, Kim Jong-min won in the Sejong A constituency to sit as the party's only member in the National Assembly but later left the party on 1 September.

On 18 May 2025, Lee Seok-hyun, a close ally of Lee Nak-yeon who had helped found the party, left the party declaring his support for Lee Jae-myung of the Democratic Party in the 2025 presidential election.

In the 2025 South Korean presidential election, party founder Lee Nak-yon declared his support for Kim Moon-soo of the People Power Party, drawing criticism from both within the party and the Democratic Party. Former co-leader Kim Jong-min strongly criticized the endorsement referring to it as "an alliance that should never have been established."

== Ideology ==
The party's manifesto said that it will "stand up for centrist reformism". It also said the party "opposes both market fundamentalism and populism".

== Election results ==
| Election | Leader | Constituency | | | | Party list | | | | Seats | | Pos. | Status |
| Election | Leader | Votes | % | Seats | +/- | Votes | % | Seats | +/- | No. | +/– | Pos. | Status |
|---|---|---|---|---|---|---|---|---|---|---|---|---|---|
| 2024 | Lee Nak-yon; Kim Jong-min | 200,502 | 0.70 | New | 1 / 254 | 483,827 | 1.71 | New | 0 / 46 | 5th | 1 / 300 | 5th | Opposition |
