= Kang Sun-young =

South Korean military officer

- Born: 1966 (age 59–60); Yeosu, South Korea
- Allegiance: South Korea
- Branch: Republic of Korea Army
- Service years: 1990–2021
- Rank: Major General
- Commands: Aviation Operational Command; Army Aviation School

Kang Sun-young (Korean: 강선영; born 1966) is a South Korean military officer and the first woman to become a two-star major general of South Korean military and to head the Aviation Operations Command of its Army.

Before being promoted to major general in November 2019, she was the president of Army Aviation School.

She started her military service in 1990 when she was commissioned as a second lieutenant in the Army. In 1993 she was admitted to Army Aviation School, where she graduated at the top of her helicopter class. She was the first woman to become Army special operation forces' jumpmaster and captain respectively. She continued to serve in aviation as the commander of the 60th Aviation Group, 11th Aviation Group and chief of staff at the Army Operations Command.
