= Jang Sung-min's Current Affairs Tank =

South Korean television series

Jang Sung-min's Current Affairs Tank (Korean: 장성민의 시사탱크) is a Korean television program of TV Chosun. It was started on 4 June 2012 and finished on 20 May 2016. On 21 March 2016, the name was changed to Current Affairs Tank (시사탱크).

The cast was Jang Sung-min, a politician of South Korea, but later changed to Kim Kwang-il.

== Controversy ==
Jang was involved in controversies about the reporting of the Gwangju Uprising. It was supported by North Korea. Although he denied it, the controversy was serious.

He declared that he would run for president as a member of People's Party. He registered to enter for the party, however, the party rejected his candidacy due to the issue mentioned above. Because of that, he created a new party with the name of Grand National United Party.
