= Kim Seon-dong =

Kim Seon-dong may refer to:

- Kim Seon-dong (politician, born 1963)
- Kim Seon-dong (politician, born 1967)
