= 2017 South Korean presidential election =

Election in South Korea

- 9 May 2017
- Registered: 42,479,710
- Turnout: 77.23% (▲1.39)
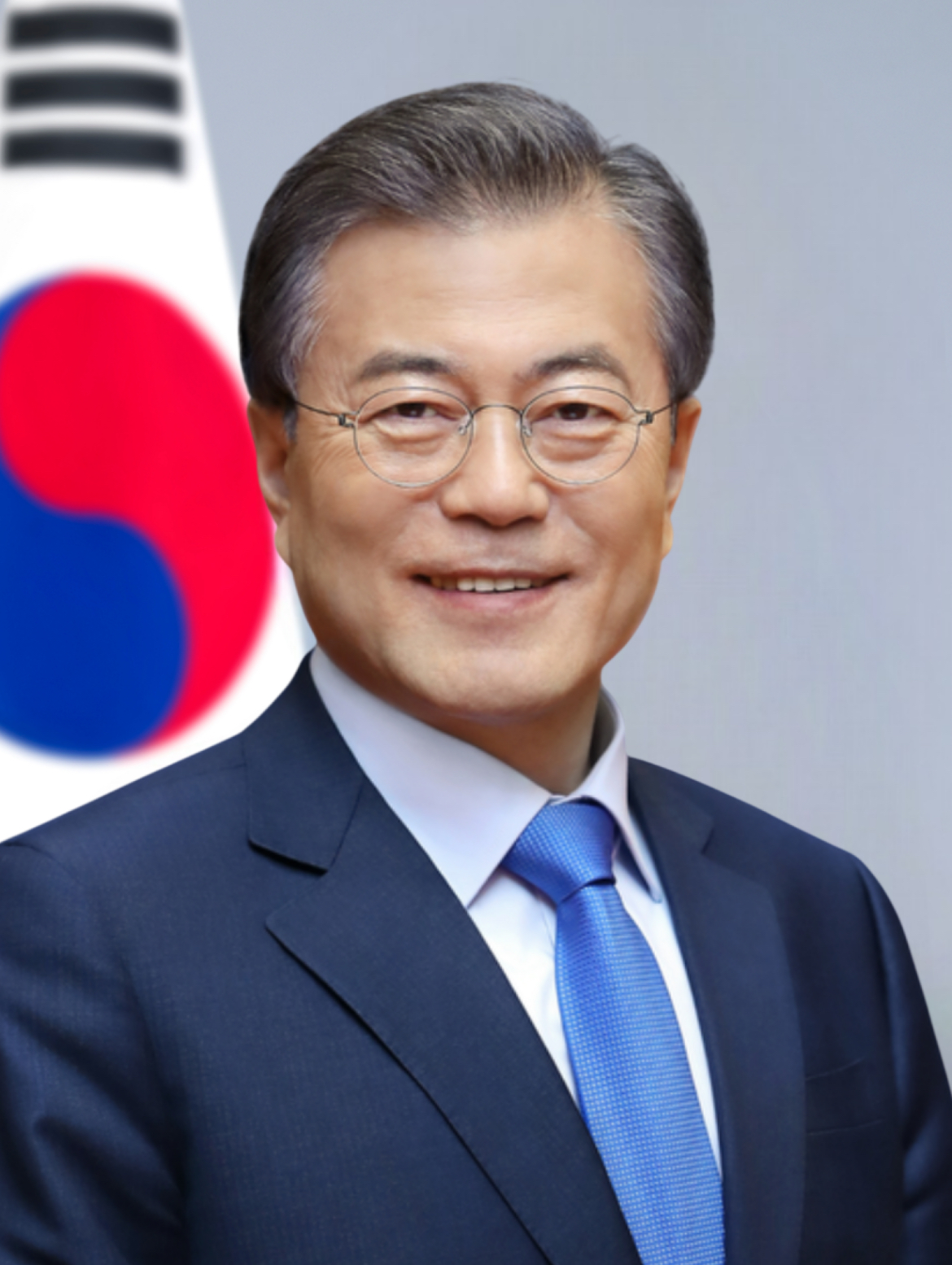

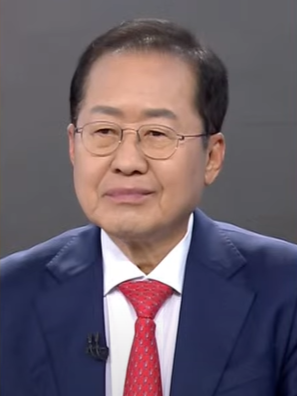

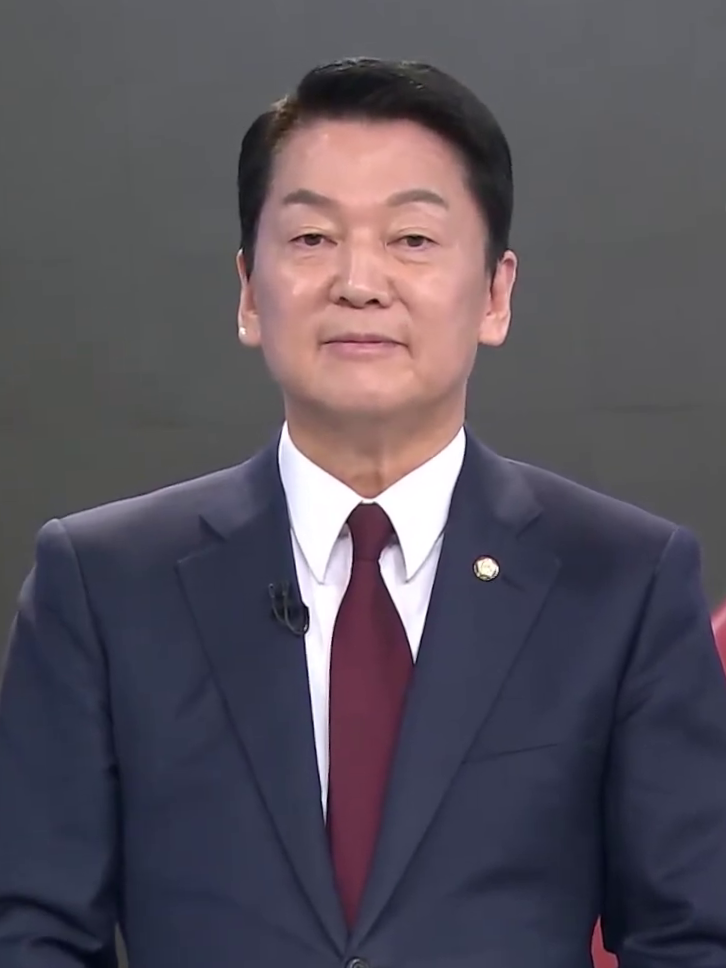

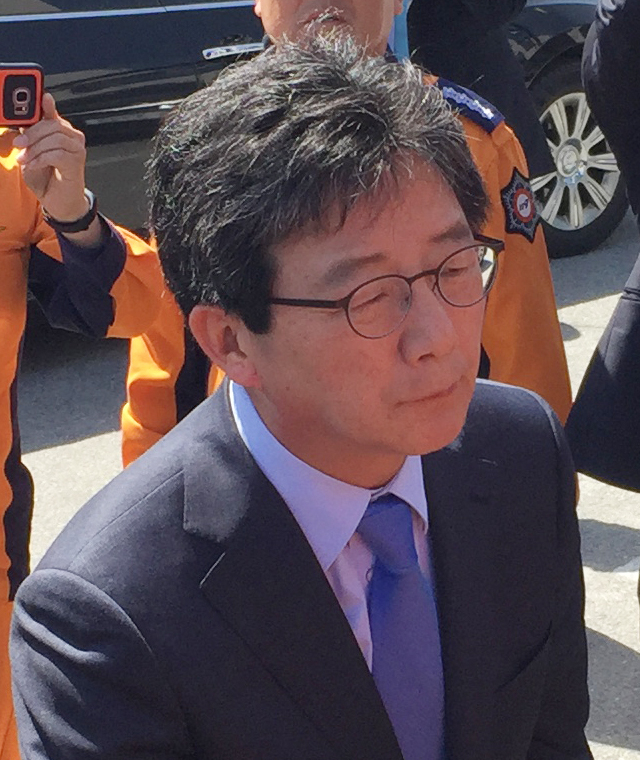

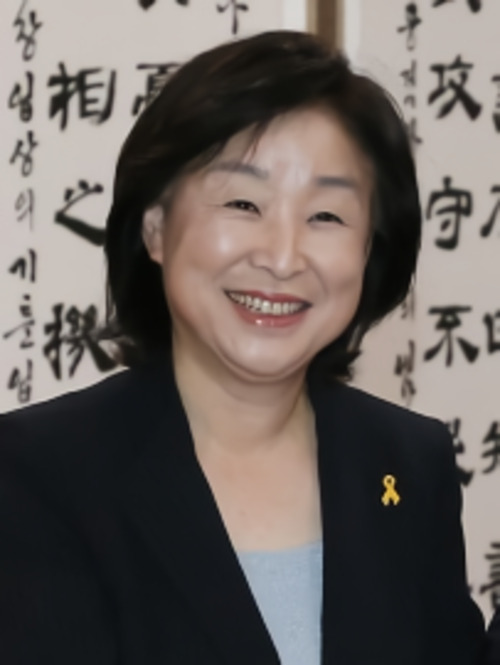
Nominee	Moon Jae-in	Hong Joon-pyo	Ahn Cheol-soo
Party	Democratic	Liberty Korea	People
Popular vote	13,423,800	7,852,849	6,998,342
Percentage	41.09%	24.04%	21.42%
Nominee	Yoo Seong-min	Sim Sang-jung
Party	Bareun	Justice
Popular vote	2,208,771	2,017,458
Percentage	6.76%	6.17%
President before election
Hwang Kyo-ahn
Acting
Independent
Elected President
Moon Jae-in
Democratic

An early presidential election was held in South Korea on 9 May 2017. The elections were conducted in a single round, on a first-past-the-post basis. Originally scheduled for 20 December 2017, the election was pushed forward following the impeachment and removal of Park Geun-hye on 10 March. This is due to a requirement by the constitution of South Korea for an election to be held within 60 days of a permanent presidential vacancy, which in this case was caused by the 10 March decision of the Constitutional Court of Korea to uphold the impeachment and remove Park from office. Later, it was confirmed by the government that the date of the election would be 9 May, making them the first snap presidential elections held directly. Following procedures set out in the Constitution of South Korea, Prime Minister Hwang Kyo-ahn succeeded Park as the acting president. After Park was removed from office by the Constitutional Court's ruling, acting president Hwang announced he would not run for a term in his own right.

Opinion polling before April consistently placed the Democratic Party's candidate, Moon Jae-in, runner-up in the 2012 election, as the front-runner. Second place in the opinion polls was initially held by former UN Secretary-General Ban Ki-moon, who declined to run in February, followed by Ahn Hee-jung, whilst he lost the Democratic primaries to Moon. Support for People Party founder Ahn Cheol-soo then surged, threatening Moon's lead in the polls throughout early April, before descending to approximately equal that of Liberty Korea Party's candidate, Hong Joon-pyo, in final polls.

Moon won the election with 41 percent of the vote, defeating his nearest opponent, Hong, by a nearly 2-to-1 margin. Under the Constitution of South Korea, if a president dies, resigns, or is removed by impeachment, a new election must take place within 60 days. As a result, unlike previous presidential elections, president-elect Moon took office immediately upon the confirmation of the result by the National Election Commission, with the inauguration at the National Assembly on the same day.

== Background ==
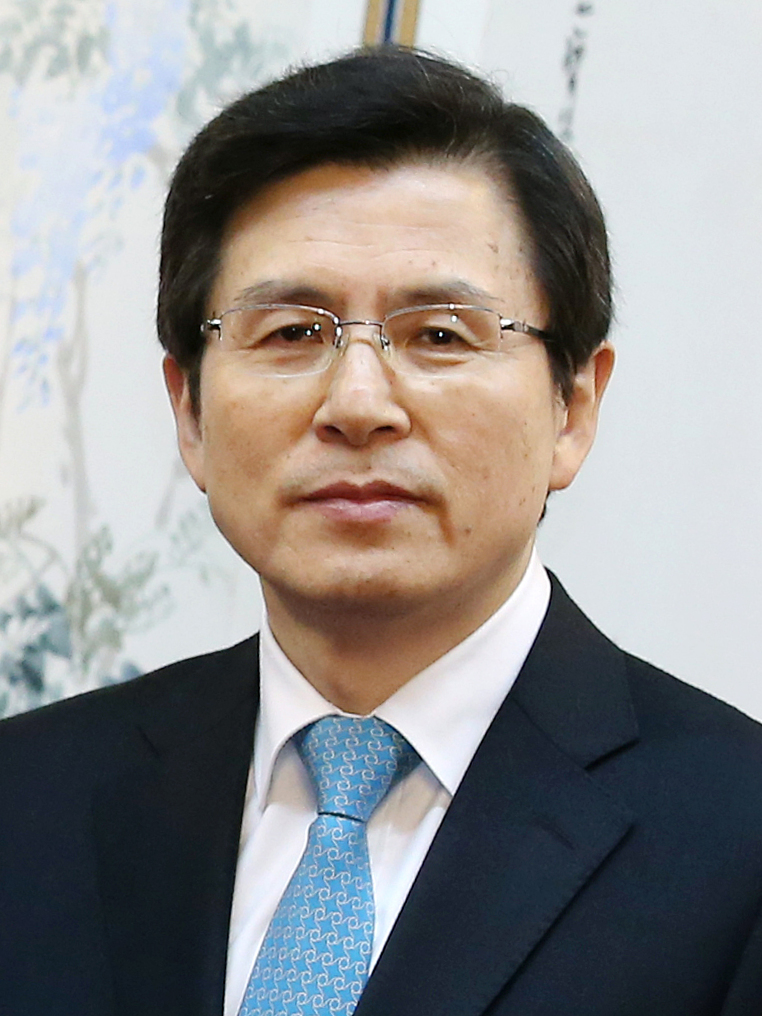
The acting incumbent in 2017, Hwang Kyo-ahn. His term expired on May 10.

Park Geun-hye of the conservative Saenuri Party (renamed just prior to the election in February 2017 as the Liberty Korea Party) won the previous presidential election in 2012, succeeding Lee Myung-bak of the same party.

The Saenuri Party lost the parliamentary election in April 2016, with opposition parties including liberal Democratic Party and People Party winning a majority in the National Assembly. Commentators described the result as leaving Park a lame duck president, as South Korean presidents are barred from reelection. and the Nikkei Asian Review noted that, in the wake of her "crushing defeat", "rivals sense a prime opportunity to complete the power shift in the December 2017 presidential vote". The Korea Times stated: "The drama of deals and power struggles for next year's election has already begun."

=== Impeachment of President Park Geun-hye ===
On 9 December 2016, President Park was impeached by the National Assembly by a vote of 234 for and 56 against (with seven invalid votes and two abstentions) after her implication in the 2016 South Korean political scandal. The Constitutional Court reviewed the motion of impeachment. Per the Constitution, Park's powers were suspended until the Constitutional Court could review the case, and Prime Minister Hwang Kyo-ahn became acting president.

The Constitutional Court had 180 days to decide whether to uphold the impeachment. On 10 March 2017, Park was formally removed from office, with a unanimous ruling by all eight of the Constitutional Court's justices supporting her impeachment. A presidential election would have to be held within 60 days. In the interim, Prime Minister Hwang served out the remainder of the 18th term until election day.

The presidential election had previously been scheduled for 20 December, with Park barred from running due to the constitutional ban on any sort of presidential reelection. However, with Park's removal from office, the elections were brought forward to 9 May in order to ensure that a new president would be able to take office within 60 days of Park's removal, as required by the Constitution.

== Registered candidates ==
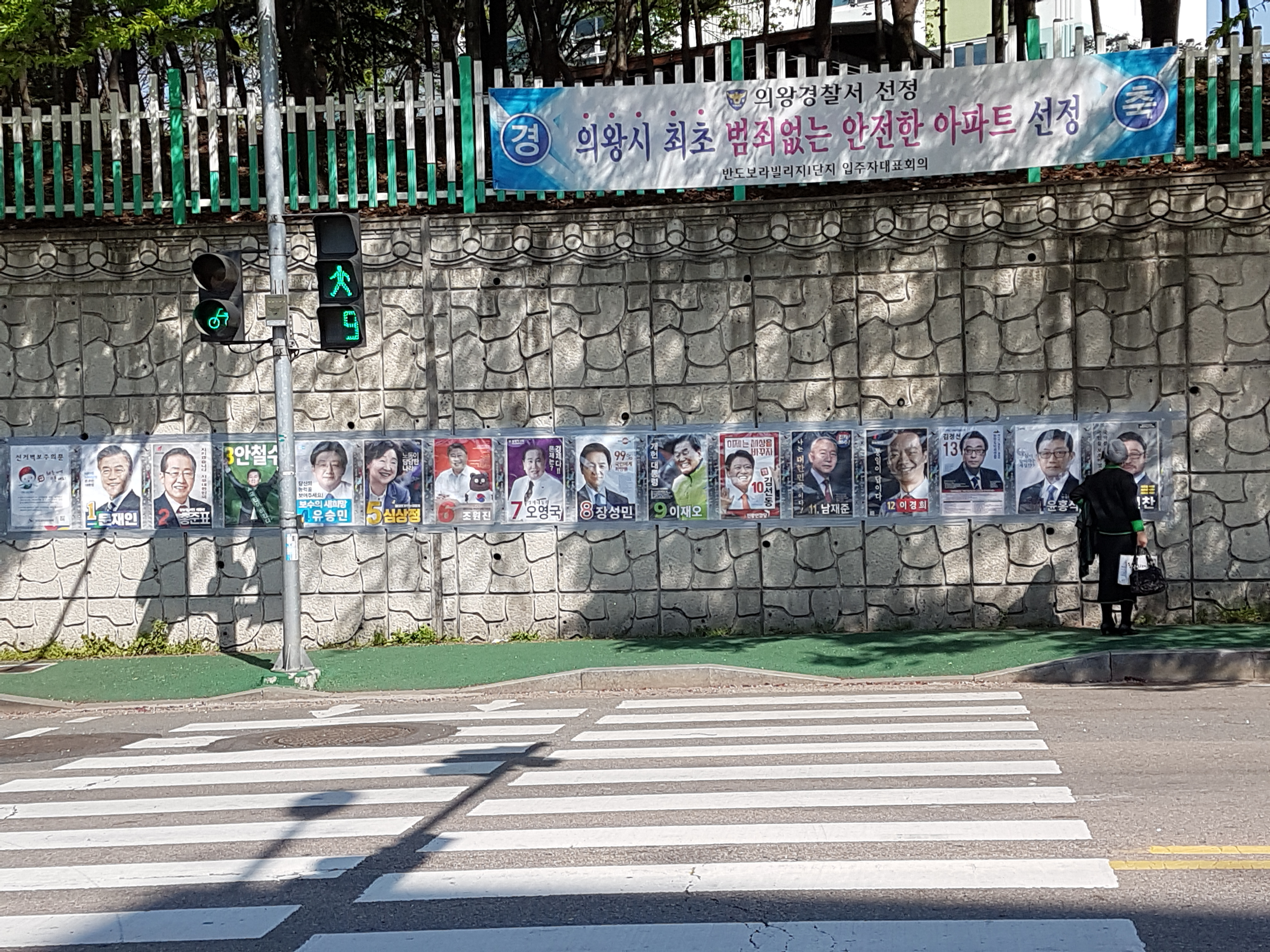
Campaign posters for the 15 candidates

The six parties represented in the National Assembly are the social liberal Democratic Party, the conservative Liberty Korea Party, the centrist People Party, the center-right Bareun Party, the progressive Justice Party, and pro-Park Geun-hye conservative Saenuri Party.

Ballot numbers for party candidates were given according to the candidate's party seat distribution in the National Assembly. Ballot numbers for independent and minor party candidates were determined through a random lottery by the National Election Commission.

A record number of 15 candidates registered, out of which two withdrew before election day.

1	2	3	4	5	6	7	8	9	10	11 (withdrew)	12	13 (withdrew)	14	15
Moon; Jae-in	Hong; Jun-pyo	Ahn; Cheol-soo	Yoo; Seung-min	Sim; Sang-jung	Cho; Won-jin	Oh; Young-guk	Chang; Sŏng-min	Lee; Jae-oh	Kim Seon-dong	Nam; Jae-jun	Lee; Kyung-hee	Kim; Jung-son	Yoon; Hong-sik	Kim; Min-chan
Democratic	Liberty Korea	People's	Bareun	Justice	Saenuri	Economic Patriots	Grand National United	Evergreen Korea	People's United	United Korea	Korean Nationalist	Future Korea Peninsula	Hongik Party	Independent

== Nominations ==
=== Democratic Party ===
==== Candidate ====
1

Democratic Party

Democratic Party candidate
Moon Jae-in

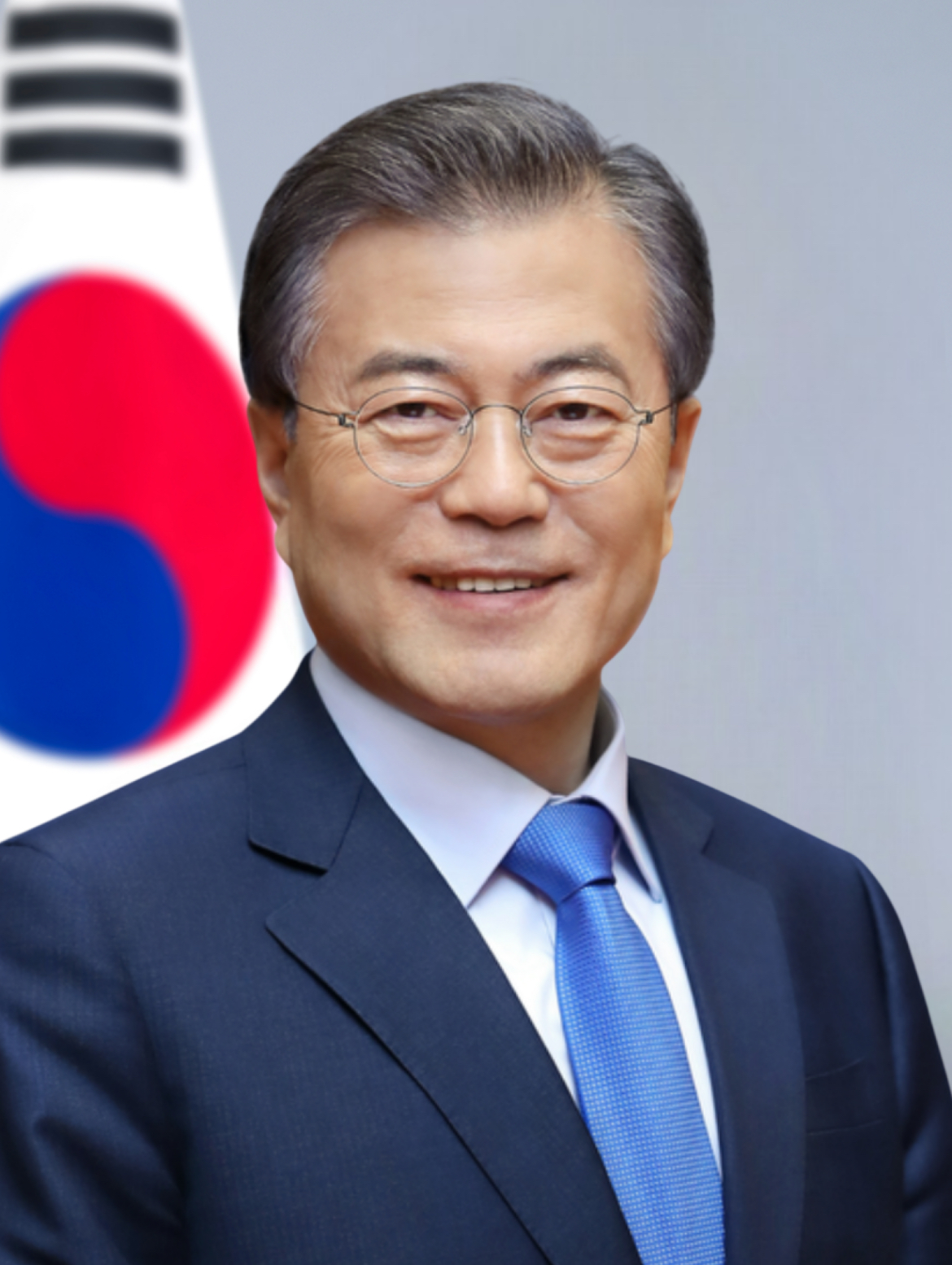

Leader of the
New Politics Alliance for Democracy·Democratic Party
(2015–2016)

==== Primary ====
Candidates were determined by an open primary of citizens who registered as a voter between February 15 to March 9, and March 12 to March 21. Overall, 2,144,840 people registered as a primary voter, making the 2017 primary the largest in Korean history.

The primary was conducted from March 22 to April 3, with the voting base divided by four regions: Honam, Yeongnam, Hoseo and Seoul Capital Area, Gangwon Province, and Jeju Province as a single region. 71.6% of the registered voters voted in the primary, putting the vote total at 1,642,640.

Candidates were:

- Moon Jae-in, Former party chairman (2015–2016), Former Member of the National Assembly for Busan Sasang (2012–2016), 2012 Democratic United Party presidential nominee
- Ahn Hee-jung, Incumbent Governor of South Chungcheong (2010–present)
- Choi Sung, Incumbent Mayor of Goyang (2010–present), Former Member of the National Assembly for Gyeonggi Goyang Deogyang B(2004–2008)
- Lee Jae Myung, Incumbent Mayor of Seongnam (2010–present)
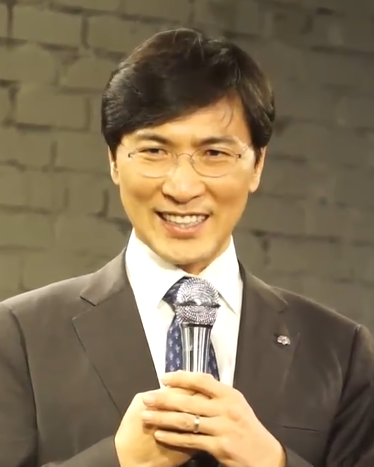
Ahn Hee-jung (announced 2 February 2017)

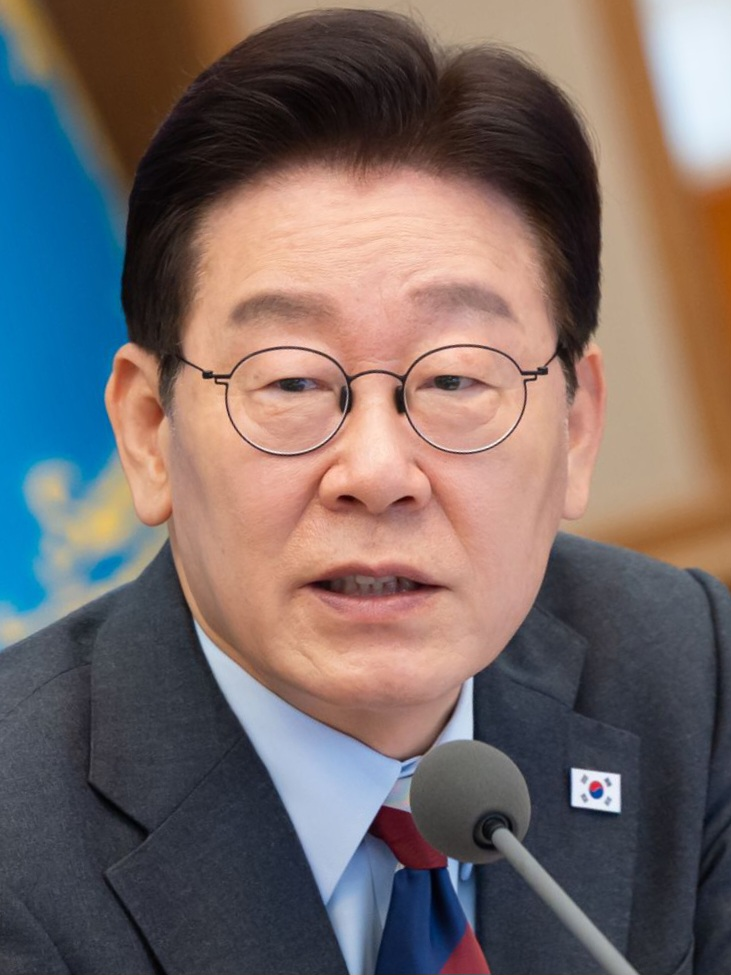
Lee Jae Myung (announced 31 January 2017)

Choi Sung (announced 30 January 2017)

Polling for the Democratic primary
Polling firm/Link	Fieldwork date	Sample size	Lee Jae Myung	Moon Jae-in	Ahn Hee-jung	Kim Boo-kyum	Park Won-soon	Kim Jong-in	Choi Sung
Polling firm/Link	Fieldwork date	Sample size	Democratic	Democratic	Democratic	Democratic	Democratic	Democratic	Democratic
Realmeter	17.03.10	374	21.9%	52.7%	22.5%	–	–	–	0.4%
R&Search	17.02.27–17.02.28	1,111	15.5%	38.0%	29.8%	–	–	–	0.2%
Korea Research	17.02.05–17.02.06	2,016	8.8%	36.9%	26.2%	2.4%	–	–	–
Realmeter	17.02.01	528	13.9%	31.4%	23.7%	4.1%	–	3.7%	0.5%
Realmeter	17.01.16–17.01.17	1,004	13.5%	32.8%	10.8%	5.6%	5.3%	5%	1.1%

==== Results ====
Candidate	Place	Votes	Percentage
Moon Jae-in	Nominated	936,419	57.0%
Ahn Hee-jung	2nd	353,631	21.5%
Lee Jae Myung	3rd	347,647	21.2%
Choi Sung	4th	4,943	0.3%
		1,642,677	100%

=== Liberty Korea Party ===
==== Candidate ====
2

Liberty Korea Party

Liberty Korea Party candidate
Hong Joon-pyo

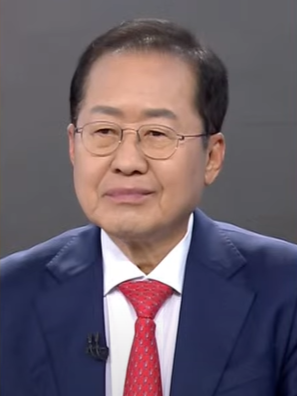

Governor of
South Gyeongsang Province
(2012–2017)

==== Primary ====
Candidate was determined by a combination of opinion polls, conducted between March 30 to March 31 (50%), and the votes cast by the delegates at the party convention held on March 31 (50%). Candidates were:

- Lee In-je, Member of the National Assembly until 2016, Gyeonggi Anyang A(1988–1995), South Chungcheong Nonsan–Geumsan(2000–2004), Nonsan–Gyeryong–Geumsan(2004–2016) Former Minister of Labour, Former Governor of Gyeonggi and 1997 presidential candidate
- Hong Joon-pyo, Member of the National Assembly until 2012, Seoul Songpa A(1996–1999), Dongdaemun B(2001–2012, Incumbent Governor of South Gyeongsang (2012–present)
- Kim Kwan-yong, Incumbent Governor of North Gyeongsang (2006–present), former Mayor of Gumi (1995–2006)
- Kim Jin-tae, Incumbent Member of the National Assembly for Gangwon Chuncheon (2012–present)
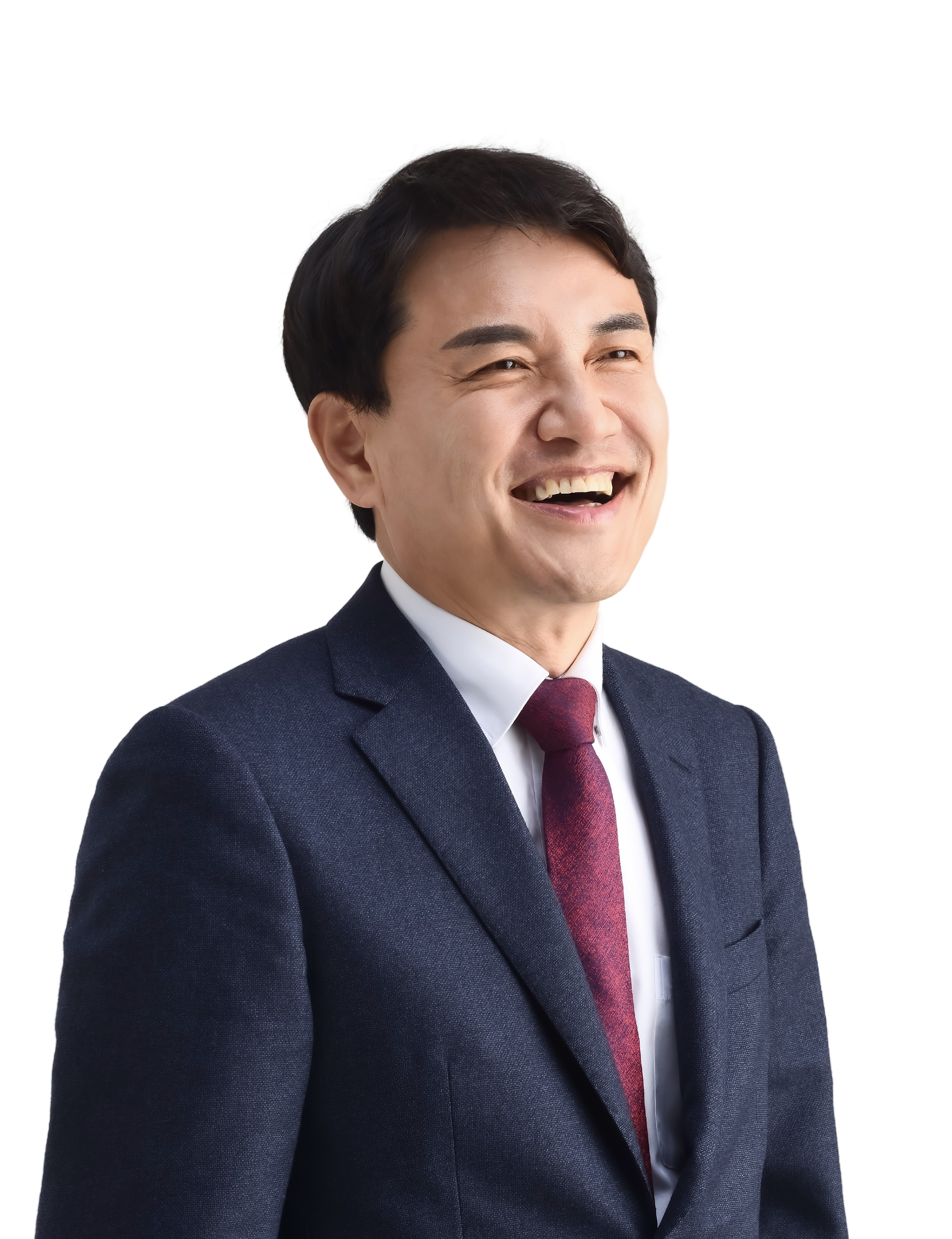
Kim Jin-tae (announced 14 March 2017)

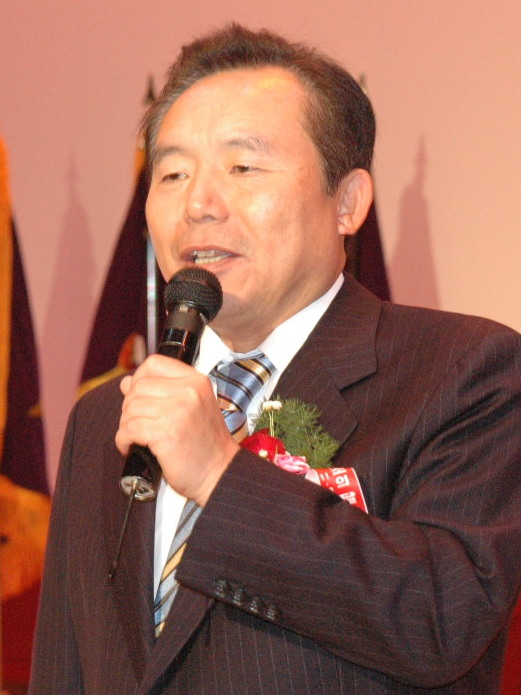
Lee In-je (announced 15 January 2017)

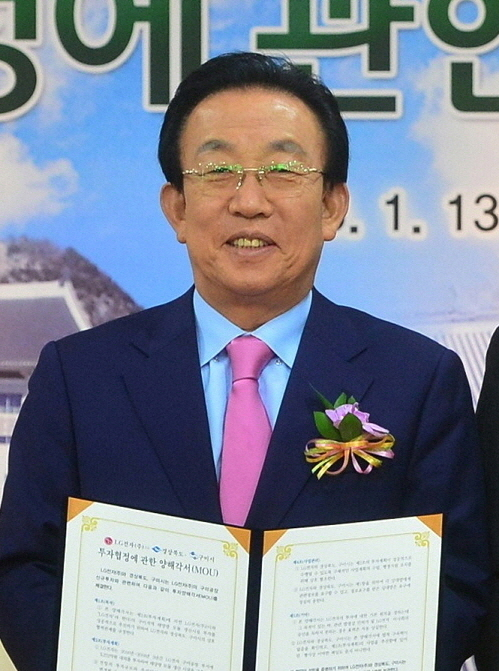
Kim Kwan-yong (announced 14 March 2017)

==== Results ====
Candidate	Place	Opinion Polls	Delegate Votes	Aggregated Result
Hong Joon-pyo	Nominated	46.7%	62.9%	54.15%
Kim Jin-tae	2nd	17.5%	21.1%	19.30%
Lee In-je	3rd	24.6%	5.1%	14.85%
Kim Kwan-yong	4th	11.2%	12.2%	11.70%
		100%	100%	100%

=== People's Party ===
==== Candidate ====
3

People Party (South Korea, 2016)

People's Party candidate
Ahn Cheol-soo

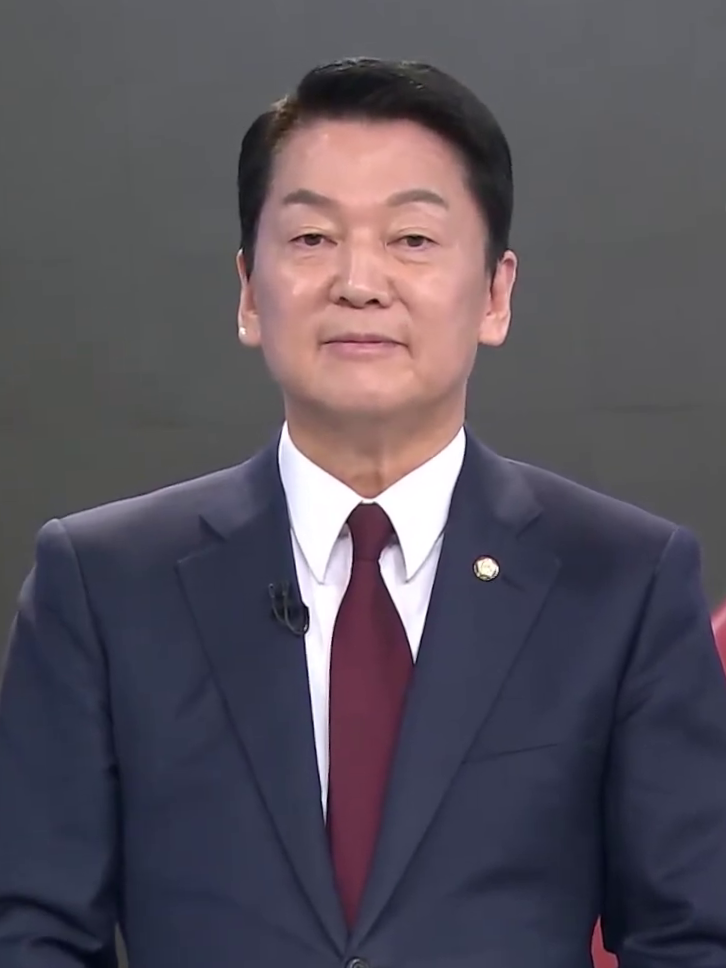

Leader of the
People Party
(2016)

==== Primary ====
Candidate was chosen by an open primary (80%) and an opinion poll conducted between April 4 and 5 (20%). The primary was conducted through March 25 to April 4, with 7 regional primaries being held. Ahn Cheol-soo was declared winner of the primary on April 4. The candidate were:

- Ahn Cheol-soo, Former party co-chairman (2016), Former co-chairman of the New Politics Alliance for Democracy (March–July 2014), withdrawn presidential candidate in 2012, founder of AhnLab, Inc., Incumbent Member of the National Assembly for Seoul Nowon C (2013–present)
- Sohn Hak-kyu, former member of the National Assembly for Seongnam Bundang B(2011–2012), former Governor of Gyeonggi (2002–06), Former Member of the Assemblyman for Gyeonggi Gwangmyeong·Gwangmyeong B(1993–1998, 2000–2002)
- Park Joo-sun, Incumbent Deputy Speaker of the National Assembly (2016–present), Member of the National Assembly South Jeolla Boseong–Hwasun (2000–2004), Gwangju Dong (2008–2012), Dong–Nam B (2012–present)
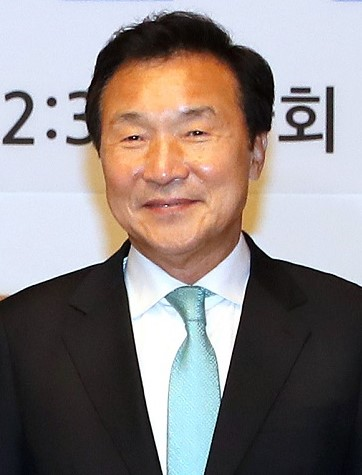
Sohn Hak-kyu (announced 19 March 2017)

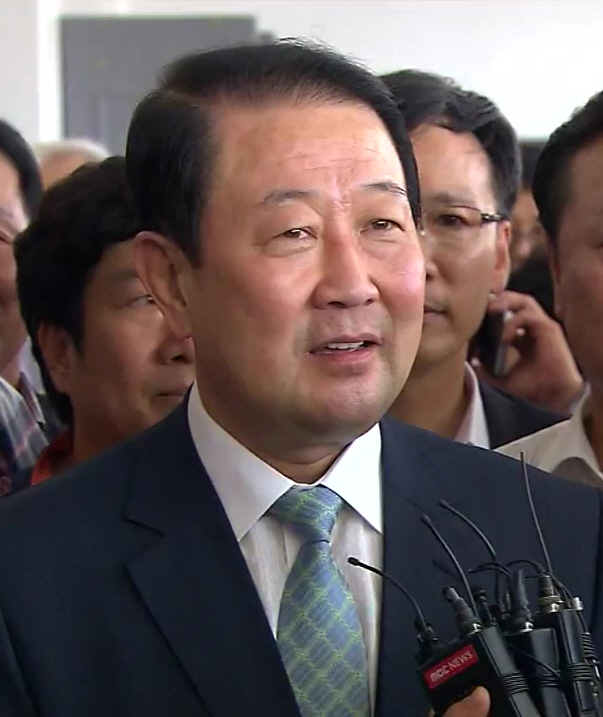
Park Joo-sun (announced 14 March 2017)

==== Results ====
Candidate	Place	Votes	Percentage
Ahn Cheol-soo	Nominated	133,927	72.71%
Sohn Hak-kyu	2nd	35,696	19.38%
Park Joo-sun	3rd	14,561	6.92%
		184,768	100%

=== Bareun Party ===
==== Candidate ====
4

Bareun Party candidate
Yoo Seong-min

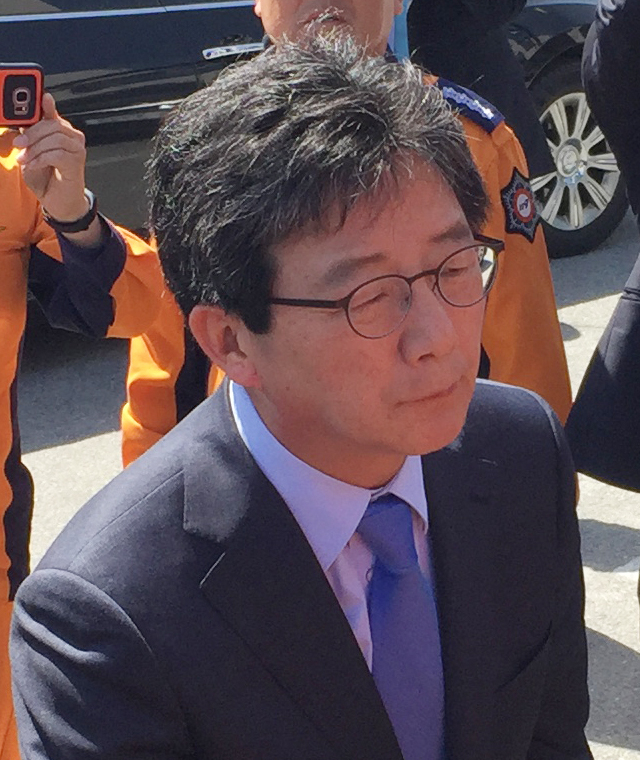

Member of the
National Assembly
(2004– )

==== Primary ====
Candidate was determined by a combination of votes from an evaluation commission based on 4 debates, held in different region of the country (40%), votes from the party members (30%), and public opinion polls (30%). Candidates were:

- Yoo Seong-min, Incumbent Member of the National Assembly for Daegu Dong B (2004–present)
- Nam Kyung-pil, Incumbent Governor of Gyeonggi (2014–present), Former Member of the National Assembly for Gyeonggi Sunwon Paldal (1998–2012), Suwon C (2012–2014)

Yoo Seong-min was nominated as the candidate of Baerun Party on March 28.

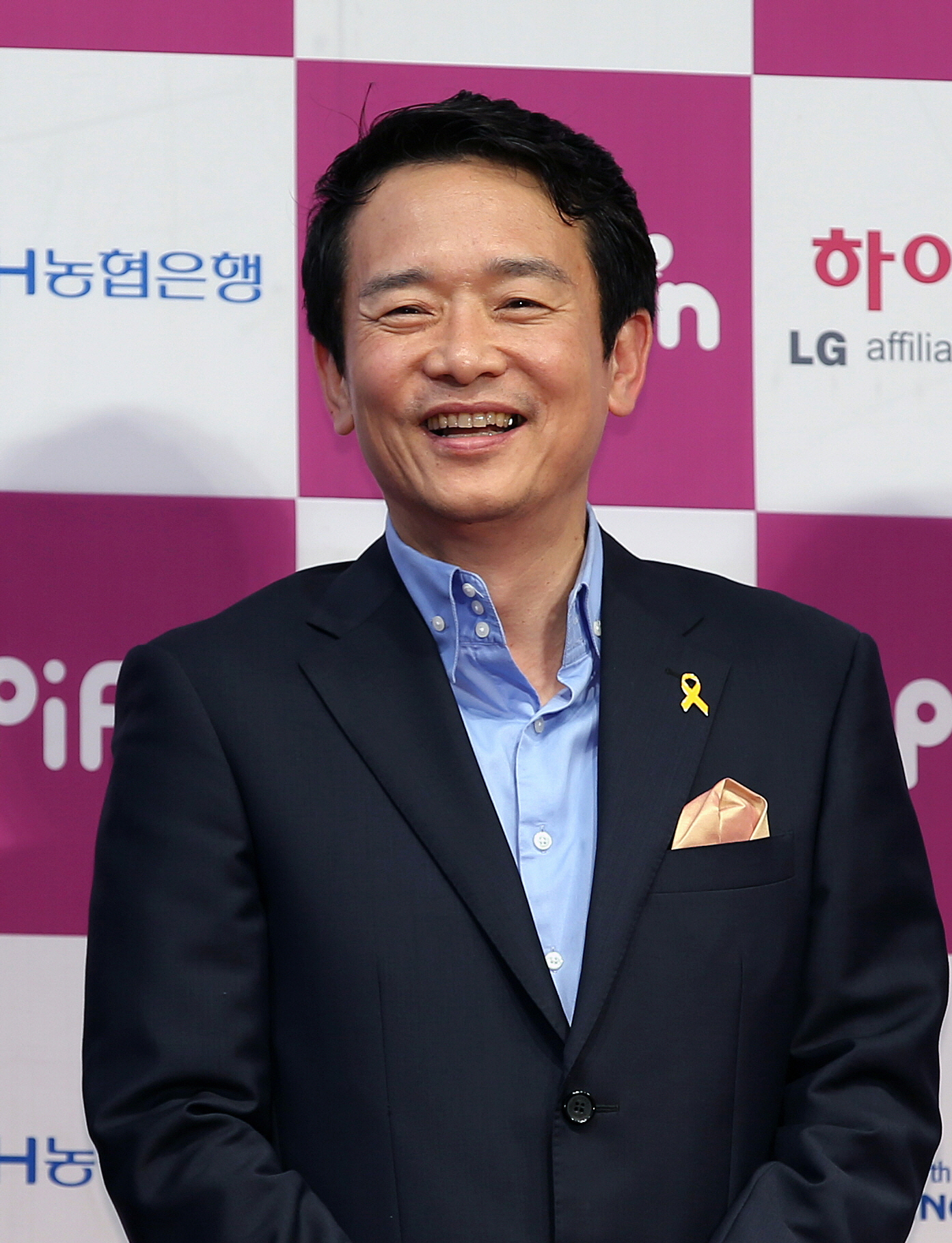
Nam Kyung-pil (announced 26 January 2017)

==== Results ====
Candidate	Place	Votes	Percentage
Yoo Seung-min	Nominated	36,593	62.9%
Nam Kyung-pil	2nd	21,625	37.1%
		58,218	100%

=== Justice Party ===
==== Candidate ====
5

Justice Party (South Korea)

Justice Party candidate
Sim Sang-jung

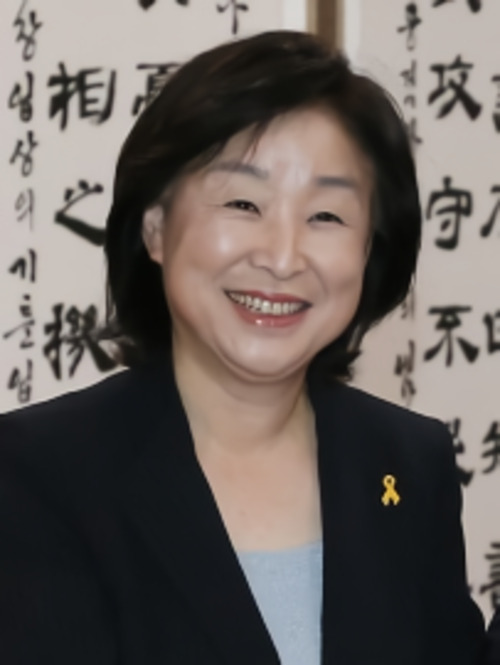

Leader of the
Justice Party
(2015– )

==== Primary ====
Candidates were determined by a closed voting of the party members. Candidates were:

- Sim Sang-jung, Chairperson of the Justice Party (2015–present), Member of the National Assembly for Proportional representation·Gyeonggi Goyang Deogyang A·Goyang A (2004– 2008, 2012–present)
- Kang Sang-goo, vice president of the Justice Party education institute

Sim Sang-jung was nominated as the candidate of the Justice Party on February 16.

==== Results ====
Candidate	Place	Votes	Percentage
Sim Sang-jung	Nominated	8,209	80.7%
Kang Sang-goo	2nd	1,962	19.3%
		10,239	100%

=== Other Nominations ===
- Cho Won-jin (Saenuri Party) Member of the National Assembly Daegu Dalseo C (2008–present)
- Oh Young-guk (Economic Patriots Party) CEO of Haha Group
- Jang Sung-min (Grand National Unity Party) Media pundit and Former Member of the National Assembly Seoul Geumcheon (2000–2002)
- Lee Jae-oh (Evergreen Korea Party) Former Member of the National Assembly Seoul Eunpyeong B (1996–2008, 2010–2016)
- Kim Sun-dong (People's United Party) Member of the National Assembly South Jeolla Suncheon·Suncheon–Gokseong (2011–2014)
- Nam Jae-jun (United Korea Party) Former Director of the NIS (2013–2014)
- Lee Kyung-hee (Korea Nationalist Party) Entrepreneur and Co-leader of the Korean Nationalist Party
- Kim Jung-sun (Future Korean Peninsula) Leader of the Future Korean Peninsula Party
- Yoon Hong-sik (Hongik Party) YouTuber and Leader of the Hongik Party
- Kim Min-chan (Independent) Chairman of the World Masters Committee

== Notable non-candidates ==
- Hwang Kyo-ahn, acting President (2016–2017), Prime Minister (2015–2017), former Minister of Justice (2013–15) announced that he would not be running for the presidency on 15 March 2017.
- Kim Boo-kyum, member of the National Assembly for Daegu (2016–present), former member for Gunpo (2000–12), announced that he would not be running for the presidency on 7 February 2017.
- Ban Ki-moon, Secretary-General of the United Nations (2007–2016), was considering running as a non-partisan candidate but announced on 1 February 2017 that he would not be running for the presidency.
- Park Won-soon, Mayor of Seoul (2011–present), announced that he would not be running for the presidency on 26 January 2017.
- Oh Se-hoon, former Mayor of Seoul (2006–2011), announced that he would not be running for the presidency on 13 January 2017.
- Kim Moo-sung, former chairman of the Saenuri Party (2014–2016), announced that he would not be running for the presidency on 24 November 2016.

== Campaign ==
=== Official campaign ===
The official campaign begun on April 17 and ended on midnight of May 8.

=== Debates ===
South Korean Presidential Election, 2017
Date	Organizers	Moderators	P Present I Invitee NI Non-invitee A Absent invitee					Notes
Date	Organizers	Moderators	Sim Sang-jung	Moon Jae-in	Ahn Cheol-soo	Yoo Seung-min	Hong Jun-pyo	Notes
13 April; 22:00 KST	SBS; Journalists Association of Korea	Kim Sung-joon	P	P	P	P	P	
19 April; 22:00 KST	KBS	Park Young-hwan	P	P	P	P	P	
23 April; 20:00 KST	NEC	Kim Jin-suk	P	P	P	P	P	
25 April; 21:00 KST	JTBC; The Korean Political Science Association	Sohn Suk-hee	P	P	P	P	P	
28 April; 20:00 KST	NEC	Park Yong-chan	P	P	P	P	P	
2 May; 20:00 KST	NEC	Lee Jung-hee	P	P	P	P	P	
Candidate viewed as "most convincing" in each debate
Debate		Poll source	Sim Sang-jung	Moon Jae-in	Ahn Cheol-soo	Yoo Seong-min	Hong Jun-pyo	Notes
14 April		Realmeter	12.2%	33.7%	21.7%	11.8%	9.6%	
14 April		JoonAng Ilbo	13.1%	22.3%	16.5%	25.0%	5.4%	
14 April		Hankook Research	15.1%	21.2%	16.2%	28.1%	7.5%	
19 April		KSOI	21.9%	15.0%	11.1%	21.5%	6.5%	
23 April		JoonAng Ilbo	22.0%	17.4%	9.0%	23.7%	6.7%	
23 April		Hankook Research	27.2%	12.6%	5.1%	22.1%	5.9%	
25 April		Hankook Research	40.6%	13.2%	6.1%	14.4%	9.9%	
25 April		Gallup Korea	30%	18%	6%	14%	9%	
28 April		The Opinion	35.8%	13.5%	5.9%	14.6%	11.5%	
28 April		JoongAng Ilbo	38.1%	11.5%	4.5%	16.6%	10.0%	
28 April		Gallup Korea	34.8%	14.4%	4.4%	12.7%	13.3%	
28 April		Research & Research	41.8%	9.3%	4.0%	18.4%	9.9%	
28 April		Kantar	40.4%	11.8%	3.9%	19.2%	11.0%	

== Opinion polling ==
Per the Public Official Election Act, release of polling results concerning election candidates was prohibited from six days from the election day until the close of voting.

Opinion polls throughout 2017 showed Moon Jae-in as the leading candidate. Polls prior to the conclusion of the Democratic primary (which included his rivals to the nomination) had Moon at around 30% support, and polls conducted after he had won the primary showed generally consistent results of around 40% by April.

Polling showed a significant decline in support for Ahn Cheol-soo during April. While at the beginning of the month he was polling close to Moon, and even exceeded him in a few polls, by May his support had dropped to around 20%. This decline coincided with rising support for Hong Jun-pyo. By the time of the polling blackout period began on 3 May, Ahn and Hong were recording similar levels of support.

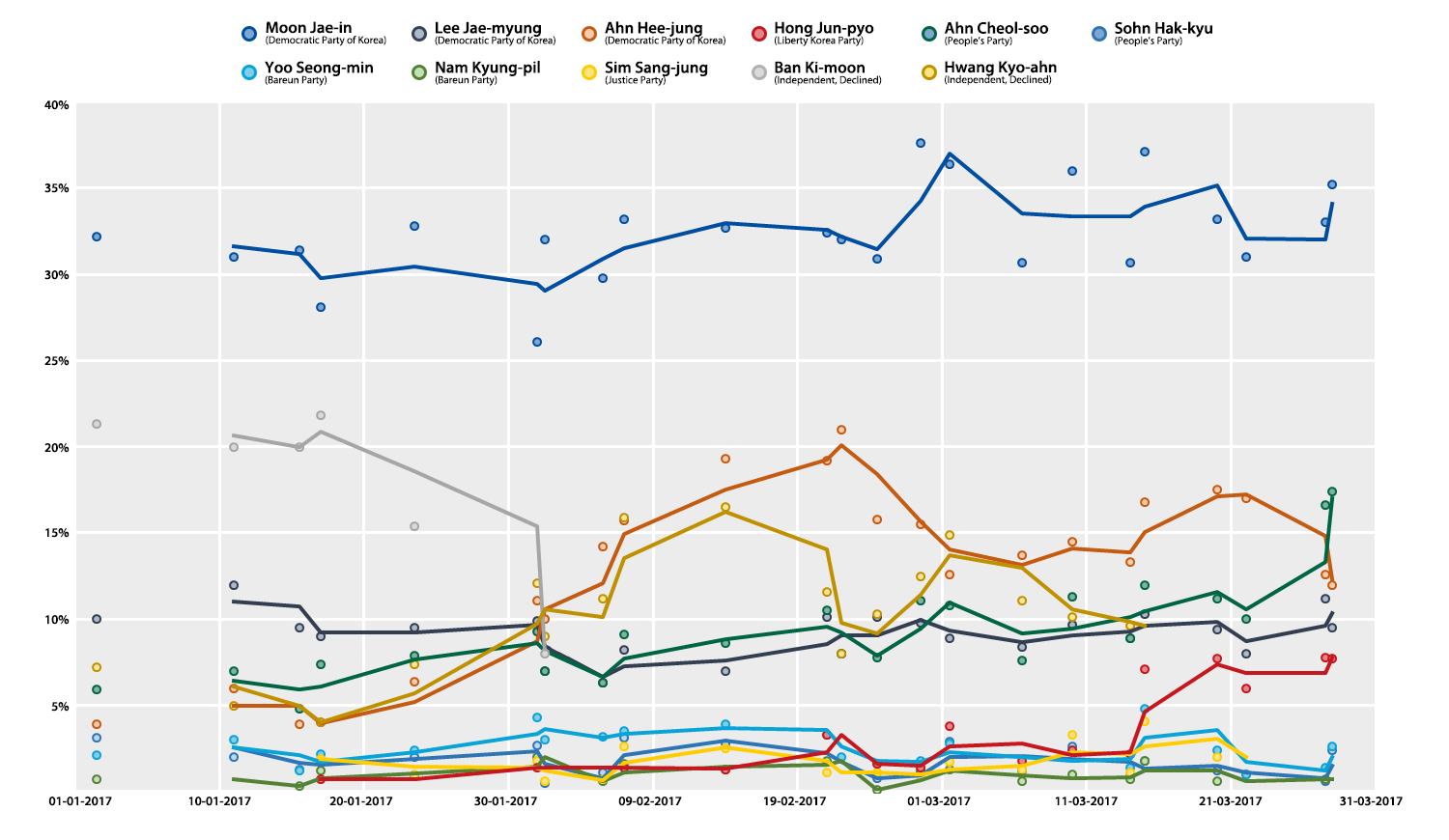
Opinion polling January–March 2017, includes persons who did not secure their party's nomination or declined to run

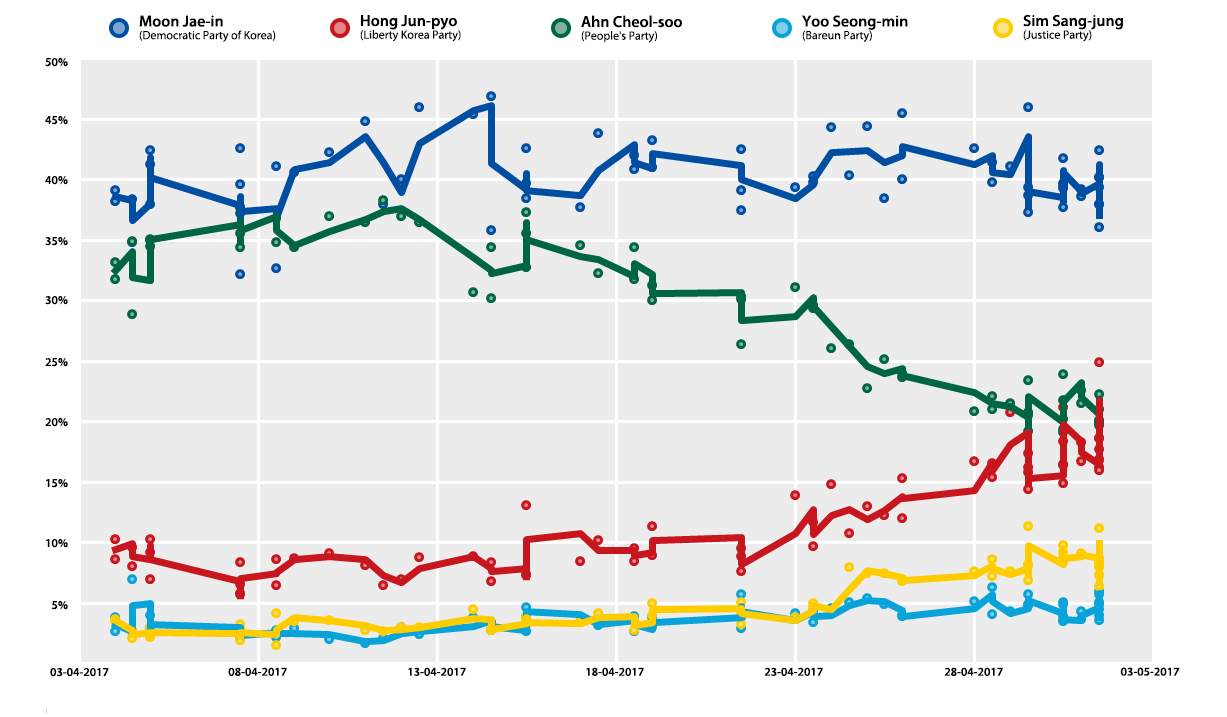
Opinion polling April–May 2017

=== Exit poll ===
KBS, MBC, and SBS Terrestrial Broadcasting Exit Survey

Candidate	Estimated Percentage
Moon Jae-in	41.4%
Hong Joon-pyo	23.3%
Ahn Cheol-soo	21.8%
Yoo Seung-min	7.1%
Sim Sang-jung	5.9%

== Results ==
Moon Jae-in of the Democratic Party won the plurality of the votes (41.09% in contrast to 24.04% won by his closest opponent Hong Joon-pyo), thus winning this election. He assumed the office as the President of South Korea immediately upon the confirmation of the results at 8:09 am on 10 May 2017 (Local time) and was inaugurated in the National Assembly at afternoon on the same day.

Moon's 17.1% margin of victory is the largest percentage margin for any liberal candidate since the beginning of free and fair direct elections in 1987.

Vote share by municipalities and provinces (inset)

Candidate	Party	Votes	%
Moon Jae-in	Democratic Party	13,423,800	41.09
Hong Joon-pyo	Liberty Korea Party	7,852,849	24.04
Ahn Cheol-soo	People Party	6,998,342	21.42
Yoo Seong-min	Bareun Party	2,208,771	6.76
Sim Sang-jung	Justice Party	2,017,458	6.17
Cho Won-jin	Saenuri Party	42,949	0.13
Kim Min-chan	Independent	33,990	0.10
Kim Sun-dong	People's United Party	27,229	0.08
Jang Sung-min	Grand National Unity Party	21,709	0.07
Yoon Hong-sik	Hongik Party	18,543	0.06
Lee Kyung-hee	Korean Nationalist Party	11,355	0.03
Lee Jae-oh	Evergreen Korea Party	9,140	0.03
Oh Young-guk	Economic Patriots Party	6,040	0.02
Total		32,672,175	100.00
Valid votes		32,672,175	99.59
Invalid/blank votes		135,733	0.41
Total votes		32,807,908	100.00
Registered voters/turnout		42,479,710	77.23
Source: National Election Commission

=== By province and city ===
Province/City	Moon Jae-in		Hong Joon-pyo		Ahn Cheol-soo		Yoo Seong-min		Sim Sang-jung		Cho Won-jin		Kim Min-chan		Kim Sun-dong		Jang Sung-min		Yoon Hong-sik		Lee Kyung-hee		Lee Jae-oh		Oh Young-guk	
Province/City	Votes	%	Votes	%	Votes	%	Votes	%	Votes	%	Votes	%	Votes	%	Votes	%	Votes	%	Votes	%	Votes	%	Votes	%	Votes	%
Seoul	2,781,345	42.34	1,365,285	20.78	1,492,767	22.72	476,973	7.26	425,459	6.48	9,987	0.15	3,950	0.06	3,416	0.05	3,554	0.05	2,177	0.03	1,277	0.02	1,938	0.03	789	0.01
Busan	872,127	38.74	720,484	32.00	378,907	16.83	162,480	7.22	109,329	4.86	2,651	0.12	2,156	0.10	981	0.04	1,316	0.06	1,041	0.05	496	0.02	465	0.02	276	0.01
Daegu	342,620	21.78	714,205	45.39	235,757	14.98	198,459	12.61	74,440	4.73	4,057	0.26	1,501	0.10	804	0.05	563	0.04	986	0.06	401	0.03	324	0.02	259	0.02
Incheon	747,090	41.24	379,191	20.93	428,888	23.67	118,691	6.55	129,925	7.17	2,646	0.15	1,681	0.09	1,230	0.07	1,618	0.09	625	0.03	594	0.03	410	0.02	374	0.02
Gwangju	583,847	61.17	14,882	1.56	287,222	30.09	20,862	2.19	43,719	4.58	152	0.02	614	0.06	2,265	0.24	655	0.07	264	0.03	136	0.01	103	0.01	111	0.01
Daejeon	404,545	42.96	191,376	20.32	218,769	23.23	59,820	6.35	63,669	6.76	1,069	0.11	758	0.08	611	0.06	620	0.07	406	0.04	256	0.03	234	0.02	168	0.02
Ulsan	282,794	38.17	203,602	27.48	128,520	17.35	60,289	8.14	62,187	8.39	829	0.11	926	0.12	641	0.09	575	0.08	441	0.06	220	0.03	240	0.03	128	0.02
Sejong	77,767	51.13	23,211	15.26	32,010	21.04	9,192	6.04	9,353	6.15	153	0.10	135	0.09	126	0.08	88	0.06	76	0.05	50	0.03	42	0.03	34	0.02
Gyeonggi	3,319,812	42.12	1,637,345	20.77	1,807,308	22.93	540,023	6.85	546,373	6.93	10,778	0.14	6,553	0.08	6,139	0.08	5,058	0.06	2,883	0.04	2,213	0.03	1,858	0.02	1,302	0.02
Gangwon	324,768	34.20	284,909	30.01	206,840	21.78	65,278	6.88	62,389	6.57	1,426	0.15	1,350	0.14	876	0.09	787	0.08	870	0.09	570	0.06	321	0.03	252	0.03
North Chungcheong	374,806	38.67	255,502	26.36	211,454	21.82	57,282	5.91	65,095	6.72	1,153	0.12	1,347	0.14	840	0.09	722	0.07	943	0.10	686	0.07	421	0.04	308	0.03
South Chungcheong	476,661	38.68	306,614	24.88	290,216	23.55	68,521	5.56	83,868	6.81	1,415	0.11	1,662	0.13	1,260	0.10	1,148	0.09	1,025	0.08	803	0.07	429	0.03	324	0.03
North Jeolla	778,747	64.90	40,231	3.35	285,467	23.79	30,802	2.57	59,296	4.94	451	0.04	2,070	0.17	1,186	0.10	1,080	0.09	589	0.05	499	0.04	345	0.03	240	0.02
South Jeolla	737,921	59.95	30,221	2.46	378,179	30.72	25,819	2.10	49,509	4.02	454	0.04	2,955	0.24	3,817	0.31	1,319	0.11	782	0.06	839	0.07	315	0.03	272	0.02
North Gyeongsang	369,726	21.76	827,237	48.69	253,905	14.95	149,017	8.77	88,080	5.18	3,053	0.18	2,499	0.15	1,308	0.08	1,054	0.06	2,942	0.17	1,068	0.06	861	0.05	476	0.03
South Gyeongsang	779,731	36.77	790,491	37.28	284,272	13.41	142,479	6.72	113,051	5.33	2,290	0.11	3,267	0.15	1,394	0.07	1,240	0.06	2,234	0.11	1,011	0.05	721	0.03	458	0.02
Jeju	169,493	45.59	68,063	18.31	77,861	20.94	22,784	6.13	31,716	8.53	385	0.10	556	0.15	335	0.09	312	0.08	289	0.08	236	0.06	113	0.03	269	0.07
Total	13,423,800	41.09	7,852,849	24.04	6,998,342	21.42	2,208,771	6.76	2,017,458	6.17	42,949	0.13	33,990	0.10	27,229	0.08	21,709	0.07	18,543	0.06	11,355	0.03	9,140	0.03	6,040	0.02
Source: National Election Commission

=== Maps ===
Results by vote share
