= Jang Sung-min =

South Korean politician (born 1963)

- Born: 5 September 1963 (age 62); Goheung County, South Jeolla Province, South Korea
- Education: Sogang University
- Political party: People Power
- Other political affiliations: Democratic (2008–2016); GNUP (2017–2018); Bareunmirae (2018–2020)

Korean name
- Hangul: 장성민
- Hanja: 張誠珉
- RR: Jang Seongmin
- MR: Chang Sŏngmin

Jang Sung-min (Korean: 장성민; born 5 September 1963) is a South Korean politician. He was formerly the president of the Grand National Unity Party.

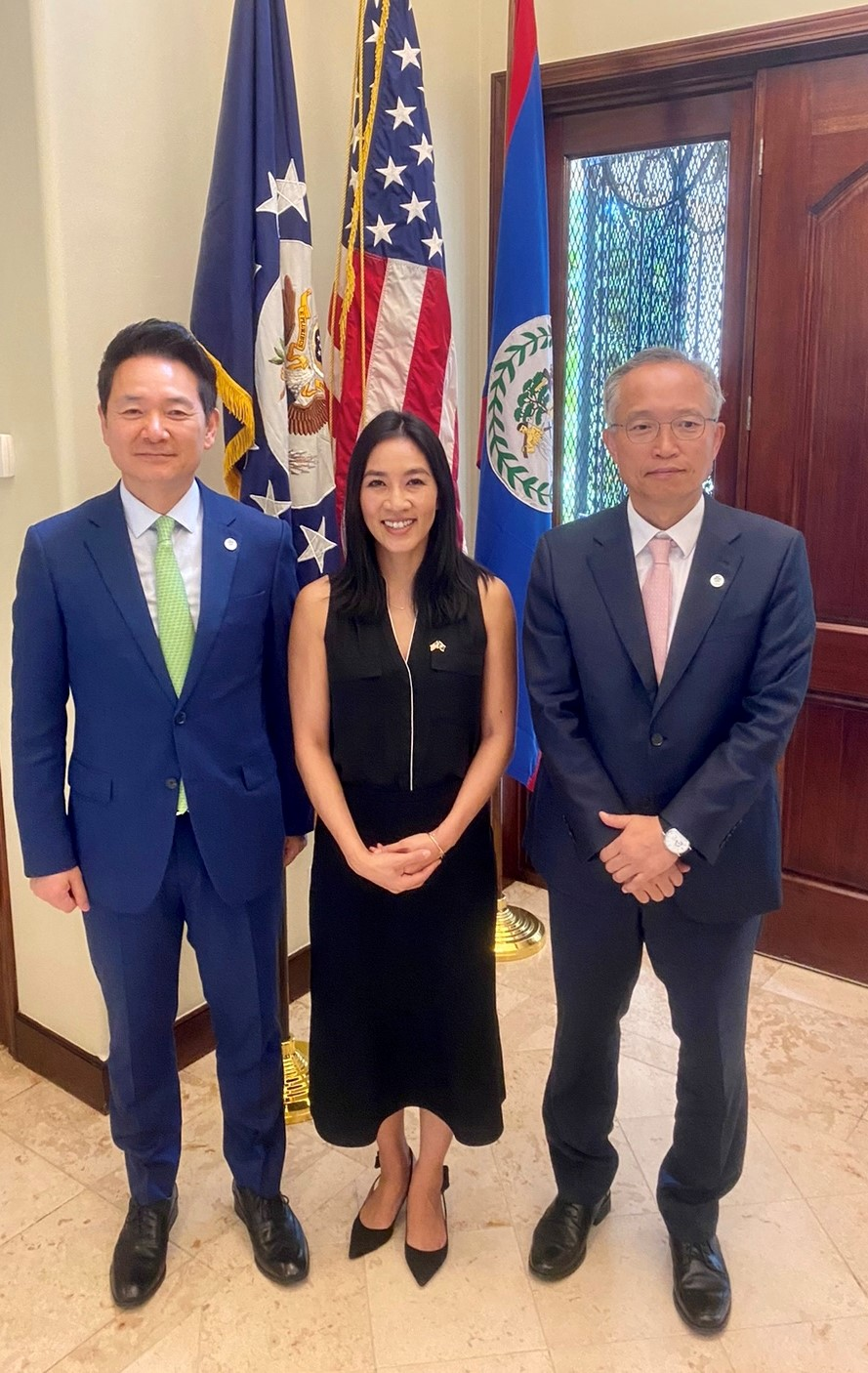
Jang (left) in Belize with US ambassador Michelle Kwan and the ROK ambassador (2023)

== Biography ==
Jang was born in Goheung County, South Jeolla Province. He started his political career under former president Kim Dae-jung. He was elected to the National Assembly as a member of the Millennium Democratic Party in 2000 but lost in 2002 due to his violation of election law.

In 2012, he became one of the hosts of the television show Jang Sung-min's Current Affairs Tank.

== Controversy ==
While he was working at Jang Sung-min's Current Affairs Tank, he was involved in controversies about reporting that the Gwangju Uprising was supported by North Korea. Although he denied it, the controversy was taken seriously.

He declared that he would run for the upcoming presidential election as a member of People's Party. He registered to enter for the party, however, the party rejected his bid. Because of that, he was forced to create a new party with the name of Grand National Unity Party.

After GNUP was dissolved, in March 2018, he joined Bareunmirae Party.
