= Hongik Party =

South Korean political party founded in 2017

- Leader: Yoon Hong-sik
- Founded: 26 May 2017
- Registered: 10 April 2017
- Headquarters: 20, Uisangbong-gil, Eunpyeong-gu, Seoul
- Membership (2024): 6,711
- Political position: Centre
- Colours: Purple

Website
- hongikdang.org

Korean name
- Hangul: 홍익당
- Hanja: 弘益黨
- RR: Hongik dang
- MR: Hongik tang

Hongik Party (Korean: 홍익당) is a South Korean political party established on 10 April 2017. Its leaders' stated goals are to "eradicate deep-rooted evils." Unlike traditional political parties, which are often defined by specific ideologies or factional logic, Hongik Party distinguishes itself by proposing policies based solely on whether they are beneficial or harmful to the public.

== History ==
The founder, Yoon Hong-sik, is a philosopher who has run the Hongik Academy, an institution focused on humanities education, since 2004. In 2016, amid concerns regarding the political scandal involving the Park Geun-hye administration, he mobilised members of the academy to collect signatures from citizens on the streets. By securing 1,000 founding promoters in each of five provinces and metropolitan cities, totalling 5,000 individuals, he established the "Hongik Party." Following its formal founding on 10 April 2017, the party ran in the presidential election that same year. The party’s candidate, however, was not elected.

Yoon Hong-sik, the leader of the Hongik Party, ran as a candidate in the 2017 South Korean presidential election. Additionally, Yoon Hyeong-sik ran for a seat on the Seoul Metropolitan Council, representing Eunpyeong-gu District 3. He finished fourth out of four candidates and was not elected. For the 2020 South Korean legislative election, the party fielded two candidates for proportional representation, with a platform that included calling for strict penalties for public opinion manipulation via online comments, the introduction of a recall system for members of the National Assembly, and the abolition of the Juvenile Act.

== Major election results ==
=== Presidential elections ===
Year	Election	Candidate	Votes	Vote share	Result	Outcome
2017	2017 South Korean presidential election	Yoon Hong-sik	18,543	0.05%	10th	Lost

=== National Assembly elections ===
Year	Election	Constituency seats		Proportional representation		Total seats	
Year	Election	Seats won	Seat share	Seats won	Vote share	Seats won	Seat share
2020	2020 South Korean legislative election	0/253	0%	0/47	0.08%	0/300	0%
2024	2024 South Korean legislative election	0/254	0%	0/46	0.04%	0/300	0%

=== Local elections ===
Year	Election	Metropolitan mayors and provincial governors		Heads of basic local governments		Metropolitan and provincial council members		Basic local council members	
Year	Election	Seats won	Seat share	Seats won	Seat share	Seats won	Seat share	Seats won	Seat share
2018	2018 South Korean local elections	0/17	0%	0/226	0%	0/824	0%	0/2,927	0%
