= Kim Seon-dong (politician, born 1967) =

South Korean politician (born 1967)

- 김선동

Member of the National Assembly
- In office 27 April 2011 – 12 June 2014
- Preceded by: Suh Gab-won
- Constituency: Suncheon

Personal details
- Born: September 9, 1967 (age 59) Goheung County, South Jeolla Province, South Korea
- Party: Minjung Party
- Other political affiliations: People's United Party (2016–2017) Independent (2014–2016) Unified Progressive Party (2011–2014) Democratic Labor Party (2011)
- Education: Korea University

Korean name
- Hangul: 김선동
- Hanja: 金先東
- RR: Gim Seondong
- MR: Kim Sŏndong
- IPA: kimsʌndoŋ

Kim Seon-dong (Korean: 김선동; born 9 September 1967) is a South Korean politician. He was the presidential nominee of the People's United Party in the 2017 South Korean presidential election.

== Early life and education ==
Kim was born on September 9, 1967, in Goheung County, South Jeolla Province, South Korea. He graduated from Korea University.

== Political career ==
=== Representative of Suncheon (2011–2014) ===
Kim ran under the Democratic Labor Party and was elected as representative of Suncheon in 2011 during snap elections. He opposed the passing of the United States-Korea Free Trade Agreement in 2011 and opened a can of tear gas in the National Assembly as a protest. As a result, he was removed from his position on June 12, 2014. He said he did not regret his actions.

=== Presidential Nominee of the People's United Party (2016) ===
Kim joined the People's United Party on March 20, 2016, along with Kim Jae-yeon; a fellow progressive politician. He was the presidential nominee of the People's United Party for the 2017 South Korean presidential election. He came in eighth place however, only receiving 0.08% of the vote.

=== 2020 South Korean legislative election ===
He announced that he will be running for representative of Suncheon in the upcoming 2020 South Korean legislative election.
