= Evergreen Korea Party =

2017–2018 political party in South Korea

Evergreen Korea Party 늘푸른한국당
- Leader: Lee Jae-oh, Choi Byung-kuk
- Founded: January 11, 2017
- Dissolved: February 9, 2018
- Split from: Saenuri Party
- Merged into: Liberty Korea Party
- Headquarters: Jongno District, Seoul
- Ideology: Conservatism; Liberal conservatism Centrism
- Colors: Blue

Evergreen Korea Party (Korean: 늘푸른한국당) was a liberal conservative political party in South Korea, founded on January 11, 2017. Lee Jae-oh and Choi Byung-kuk were co-chairpersons of the party.

The party officially dissolved on February 9, 2018, with most members rejoining the Liberty Korea Party.
